= Cleveland Guardians =

Major League Baseball franchise in Cleveland, Ohio

- 2026 Cleveland Guardians season

Logo	Cap insignia
- Established in 1896; Based in Cleveland since 1900

Major league affiliations
- American League (1901–present); Central Division (1994–present); East Division (1969–1993)

Current uniform
- Retired numbers: 3; 5; 14; 18; 19; 20; 21; 25; 42; 455

Colors
- Navy blue, red, white

Name
- Cleveland Guardians (2022–present); Cleveland Indians (1915–2021); Cleveland Naps (1903–1914); Cleveland Broncos (1902); Cleveland Bluebirds (1901); Cleveland Lake Shores (1900); Grand Rapids Prodigals (1899); Columbus Buckeyes/Senators (1896–1899)

Nicknames
- Guards, Tribe (carryover from the Indians, less common)

Ballpark
- Progressive Field (1994–present); Cleveland Stadium (1932–1933, 1937–1993) (Note: Nights, weekends, and select games from 1937 to 1946); League Park (1900–1932, 1934–1946); Ramona Park (1899); Western League Park (1896–1899)

Major league titles
- World Series titles (2): 1920; 1948
- AL pennants (6): 1920; 1948; 1954; 1995; 1997; 2016
- AL Central division titles (14): 1995; 1996; 1997; 1998; 1999; 2001; 2007; 2016; 2017; 2018; 2022; 2024; 2025; 2026
- Wild card berths (2): 2013; 2020

Front office
- Principal owner: Dolan family
- President: Paul Dolan (Owner/Chairman / CEO)
- President of baseball operations: Chris Antonetti
- General manager: Mike Chernoff
- Manager: Stephen Vogt
- Website: mlb.com/guardians

The Cleveland Guardians are an American professional baseball team based in Cleveland. The Guardians compete in Major League Baseball (MLB) as a member club of the American League (AL) Central Division. Since 1994, the team has played its home games at Progressive Field (originally known as Jacobs Field after the team's then-owner). Since their establishment as a Major League franchise in 1901, the team has won 14 Central Division titles, six American League pennants, and two World Series championships (in 1920 and 1948). The team's World Series championship drought, dating to 1948, is the longest active among the 30 current Major League teams. The team's name is derived from the Guardians of Traffic, eight 1932 Art Deco sculptures by Henry Hering on the city's Hope Memorial Bridge, which is adjacent to Progressive Field. The team's mascot is named "Slider". The team's spring training facility is at Goodyear Ballpark in Goodyear, Arizona.

The franchise originated in 1896 as the Columbus Buckeyes (also known as the Columbus Senators), a minor league club based in Columbus, Ohio that played in the Western League. The team relocated to Grand Rapids, Michigan, midway through the 1899 season, where they were known as the Grand Rapids Prodigals. In 1900, the franchise moved to Cleveland and was called the Cleveland Lake Shores. The Western League itself was renamed the American League prior to the 1900 season while continuing its minor league status. When the American League declared itself a major league in 1901, Cleveland was one of its eight charter franchises. Originally known as the Cleveland Bluebirds, or Blues, the team was also unofficially called the Cleveland Broncos in 1902. Beginning in 1903, the team was named the Cleveland Napoleons, or Naps, after team captain and manager Nap Lajoie.

Lajoie left after the 1914 season, and club owner Charles Somers requested that baseball writers choose a new name. They chose Cleveland Indians, which remained in use for more than a century. Common nicknames for the Indians were "the Tribe" and "the Wahoos", the latter referencing their longtime logo, Chief Wahoo. After the Indians name came under criticism as part of the Native American mascot controversy, the team adopted the current name, Guardians, beginning with the 2022 season.

From August 24 to September 14, 2017, the team won 22 consecutive games, the longest winning streak in American League history, and the second-longest winning streak in MLB history.

As of the end of the 2026 season, the franchise's overall major league record is 10,025–9,520–91 (.513).

== Early Cleveland baseball teams ==
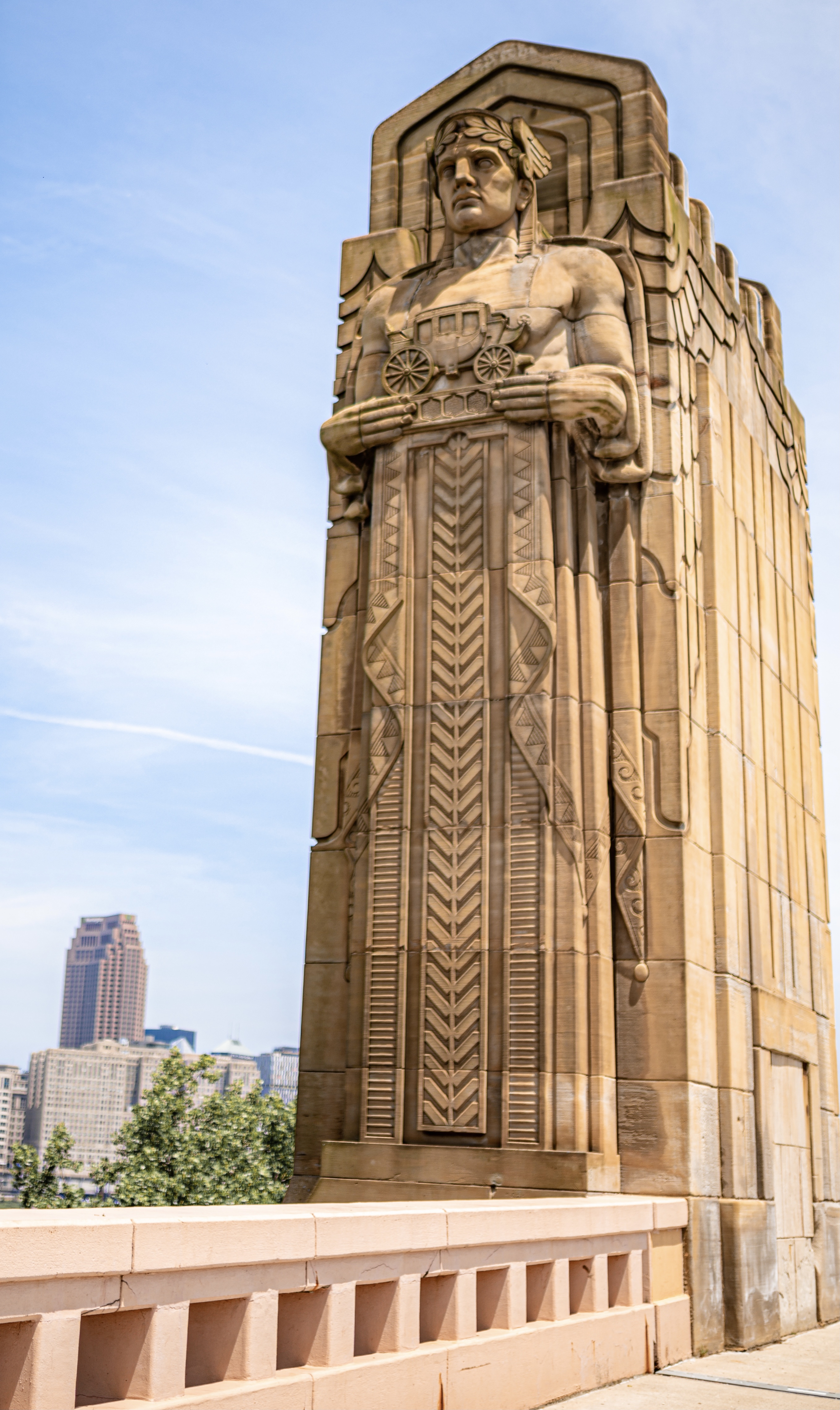
The team is named after the eight Guardians of Traffic statues displayed on the Hope Memorial Bridge next to their home field.

According to one historian of baseball, "in 1857, baseball games were a daily spectacle in Cleveland's Public Squares. City authorities tried to find an ordinance forbidding it; to the joy of the crowd, they were unsuccessful."

=== 1865–1872: Forest Citys of Cleveland ===
From 1865 to 1868 Forest Citys was an amateur ball club. During the 1869 season, Cleveland was among several cities that established professional baseball teams following the success of the 1869 Cincinnati Red Stockings, the first fully professional team. In the newspapers before and after 1870, the team was often called the Forest Citys, in the same generic way that the team from Chicago was sometimes called The Chicagos. A professional baseball team has played in Cleveland for all but a few years since then.

In 1871 the Forest Citys joined the new National Association of Professional Base Ball Players (NA), the first professional league. Ultimately, two of the league's western clubs went out of business during the first season and the Chicago Fire left that city's White Stockings impoverished, unable to field a team again until 1874. Cleveland was thus the NA's westernmost outpost in 1872, the year the club folded. Cleveland played its full schedule to July 19 followed by two games versus Boston in mid-August and disbanded at the end of the season.

=== 1879–1884: Cleveland Forest Citys and Blues ===
In 1876, the National League (NL) supplanted the NA as the major professional league. Cleveland was not among its charter members, but by 1879 the league was looking for new entries and the city gained an NL team. A new Cleveland Forest Citys were recreated, but by 1882 were known as the Cleveland Blues, because the National League required distinct colors for that season. The Blues had mediocre records for six seasons and were ruined by a trade war with the Union Association (UA) in 1884, when its three best players (Fred Dunlap, Jack Glasscock, and Jim McCormick) jumped to the UA after being offered higher salaries. The Cleveland Blues merged with the St. Louis Maroons UA team in 1885.

=== 1887–1899: Cleveland Spiders (nicknamed "Blues") ===
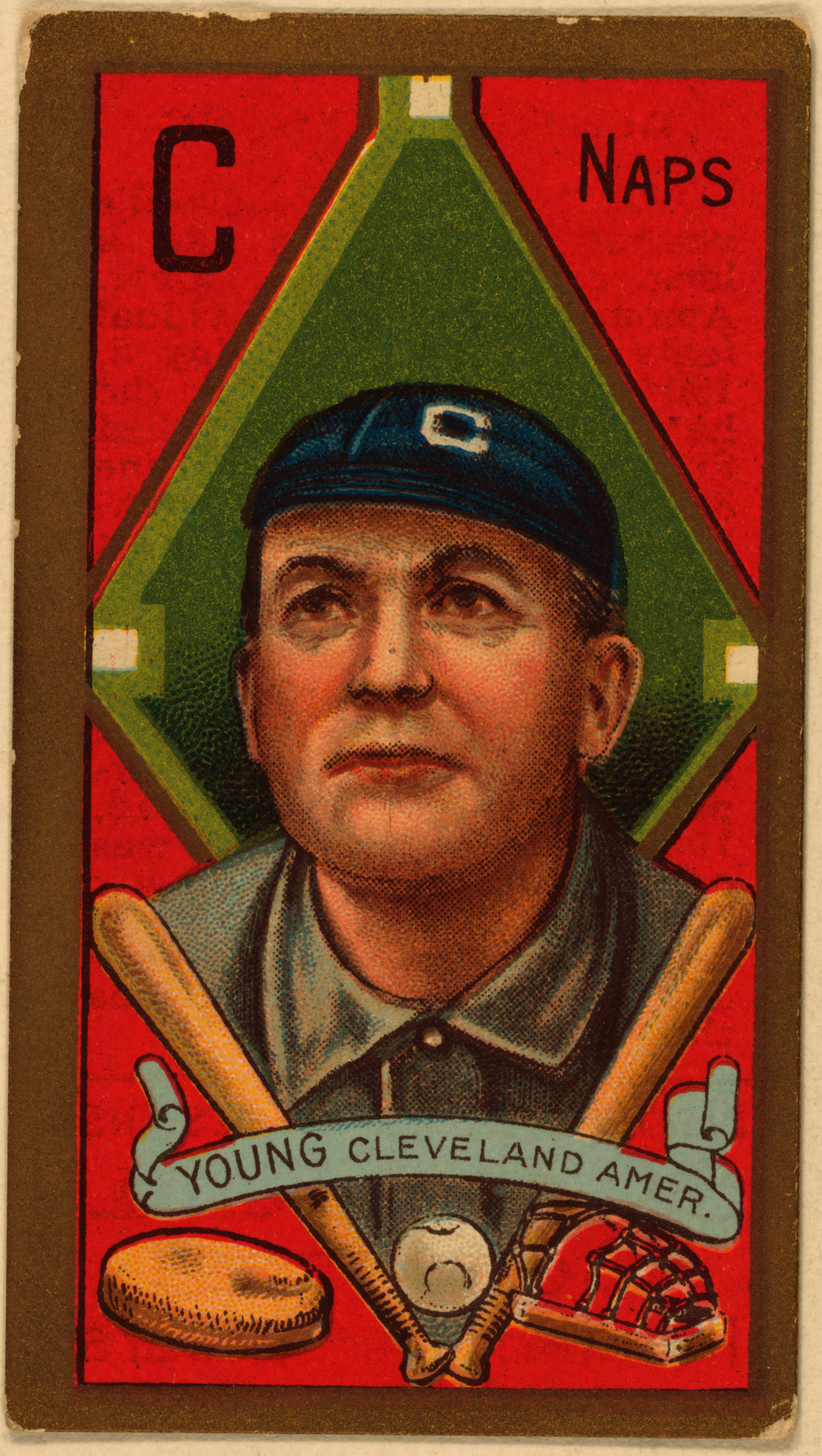
Cy Young on a 1911 baseball card

Cleveland went without major league baseball for two seasons until gaining a team in the American Association (AA) in 1887. After the AA's Pittsburgh Alleghenys jumped to the NL, Cleveland followed suit in 1889, as the AA began to crumble. The Cleveland ball club, called the Spiders (supposedly inspired by their "skinny and spindly" players), slowly became a power in the league. In 1891, the Spiders moved into League Park, which would serve as the home of Cleveland professional baseball for the next 55 years. Led by native Ohioan Cy Young, the Spiders became a contender in the mid-1890s, playing in the Temple Cup Series (that era's World Series) twice and winning it in 1895. The team began to fade after this success and was dealt a severe blow under the ownership of the Robison brothers.

Prior to the 1899 season, Frank Robison, the Spiders' owner, bought the St. Louis Browns, thus owning two clubs at the same time. The Browns were renamed the "Perfectos" and restocked with Cleveland talent. Just weeks before the season opener, most of the better Spiders were transferred to St. Louis, including three future Hall of Famers: Cy Young, Jesse Burkett and Bobby Wallace. The roster maneuvers failed to create a powerhouse Perfectos team, as St. Louis finished fifth in both 1899 and 1900. The Spiders were left with essentially a minor league lineup and began to lose games at a record pace. Drawing almost no fans at home, they ended up playing most of their season on the road, and became known as "The Wanderers". The team ended the season in 12th place, 84 games out of first place, with an all-time worst record of 20–134 (.130 winning percentage). Following the 1899 season, the National League disbanded four teams, including the Spiders franchise. The disastrous 1899 season would actually be a step toward a new future for Cleveland fans the next year.

=== 1890: Cleveland Infants (nickname "Babes") ===
The Cleveland Infants competed in the Players' League, which was well-attended in some cities, but club owners lacked the confidence to continue beyond the one season. The Cleveland Infants finished with 55 wins and 75 losses, playing their home games at Brotherhood Park.

== History ==
=== 1896–1935: Columbus, Grand Rapids, and the early Cleveland years ===
The origins of the team date back to 1896, when the team was founded as the Columbus Buckeyes, a team based in Columbus, Ohio and competing in the Western League. The club was owned by Tom Loftus, a close friend of both league president Ban Johnson and Charlie Comiskey, owner of the league's St. Paul Saints. In July 1899, the Western League franchise swapped cities midseason with the Grand Rapids franchise of the Interstate League, becoming the Grand Rapids Prodigals while remaining in the Western League.

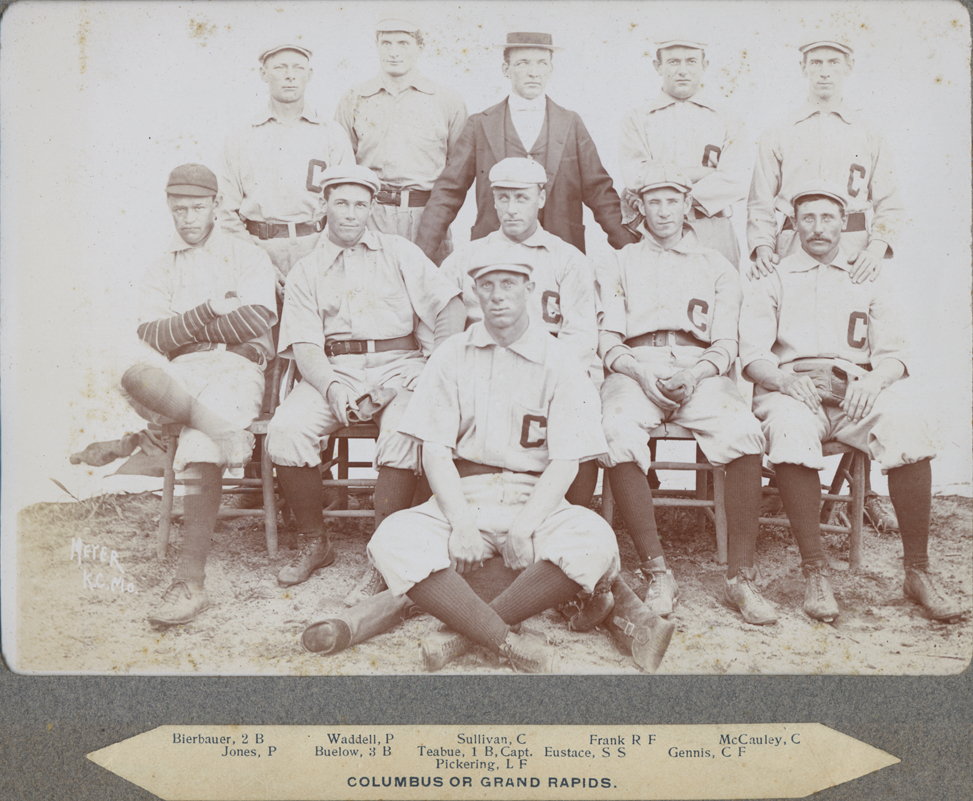
The 1899 Columbus/Grand Rapids team. Hall of Famer Rube Waddell is back row, second from the left.

In 1900, the team moved to Cleveland and was named the Cleveland Lake Shores, coinciding with Ban Johnson's change of the league name from the Western League to the American League. In 1900, the American League was still considered a minor league. In 1901, the team was called the Cleveland Bluebirds or Blues when the American League broke with the National Agreement and declared itself a competing Major League. The Cleveland franchise was among its eight charter members and is one of four teams that remain in its original city, along with Boston, Chicago, and Detroit.

The new team was owned by coal magnate Charles Somers and tailor Jack Kilfoyl. Somers, a wealthy industrialist and also co-owner of the Boston Americans, lent money to other team owners, including Connie Mack's Philadelphia Athletics, to keep them and the new league afloat. Players did not think the name "Bluebirds" was suitable for a baseball team. Writers frequently shortened it to Cleveland Blues due to the players' all-blue uniforms, but the players did not like this unofficial name either. The players themselves tried to change the name to Cleveland Bronchos in 1902, but this name never caught on.

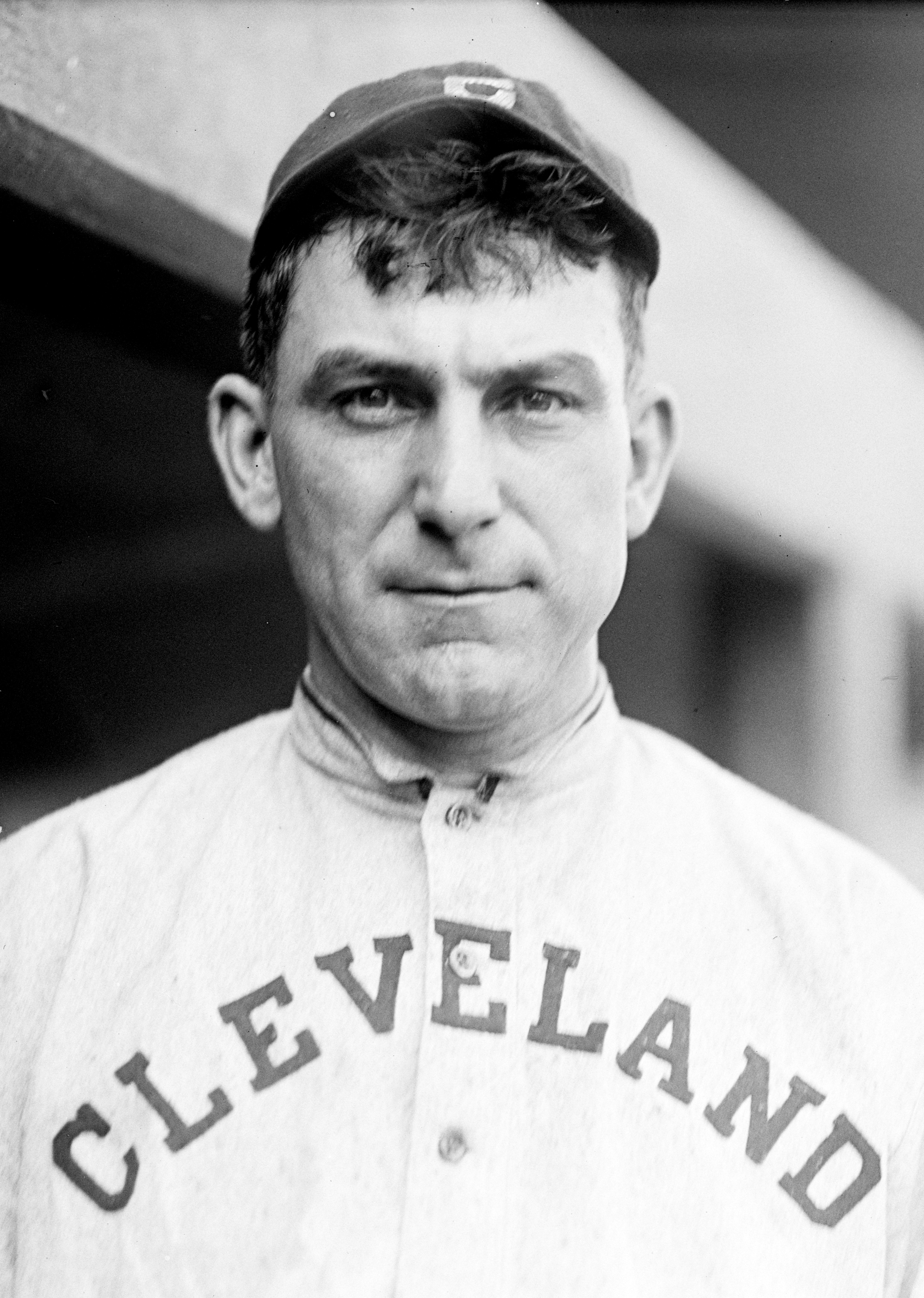
Nap Lajoie, who won the 1903 American League Batting Championship with the Cleveland Naps, was the team's namesake from 1903 to 1915, and is an MLB Hall of Famer.

Cleveland suffered from financial problems in their first two seasons. This led Somers to seriously consider moving to either Pittsburgh or Cincinnati. Relief came in 1902 as a result of the conflict between the National and American Leagues. In 1901, Napoleon "Nap" Lajoie, the Philadelphia Phillies' star second baseman, jumped to the A's after his contract was capped at $2,400 per year—one of the highest-profile players to jump to the upstart AL. The Phillies subsequently filed an injunction to force Lajoie's return, which was granted by the Pennsylvania Supreme Court. The injunction appeared to doom any hopes of an early settlement between the warring leagues. However, a lawyer discovered that the injunction was only enforceable in the state of Pennsylvania. Mack, partly to thank Somers for his past financial support, agreed to trade Lajoie to the then-moribund Blues, who offered $25,000 salary over three years. Due to the injunction, however, Lajoie had to sit out any games played against the A's in Philadelphia. Lajoie arrived in Cleveland on June 4 and was an immediate hit, drawing 10,000 fans to League Park. Soon afterward, he was named team captain, and in 1903 the team was called the Cleveland Napoleons or Naps after a newspaper conducted a write-in contest.

Lajoie was named manager in 1905, and the team's fortunes improved somewhat. They finished half a game short of the pennant in 1908. However, the success did not last and Lajoie resigned during the 1909 season as manager but remained on as a player.

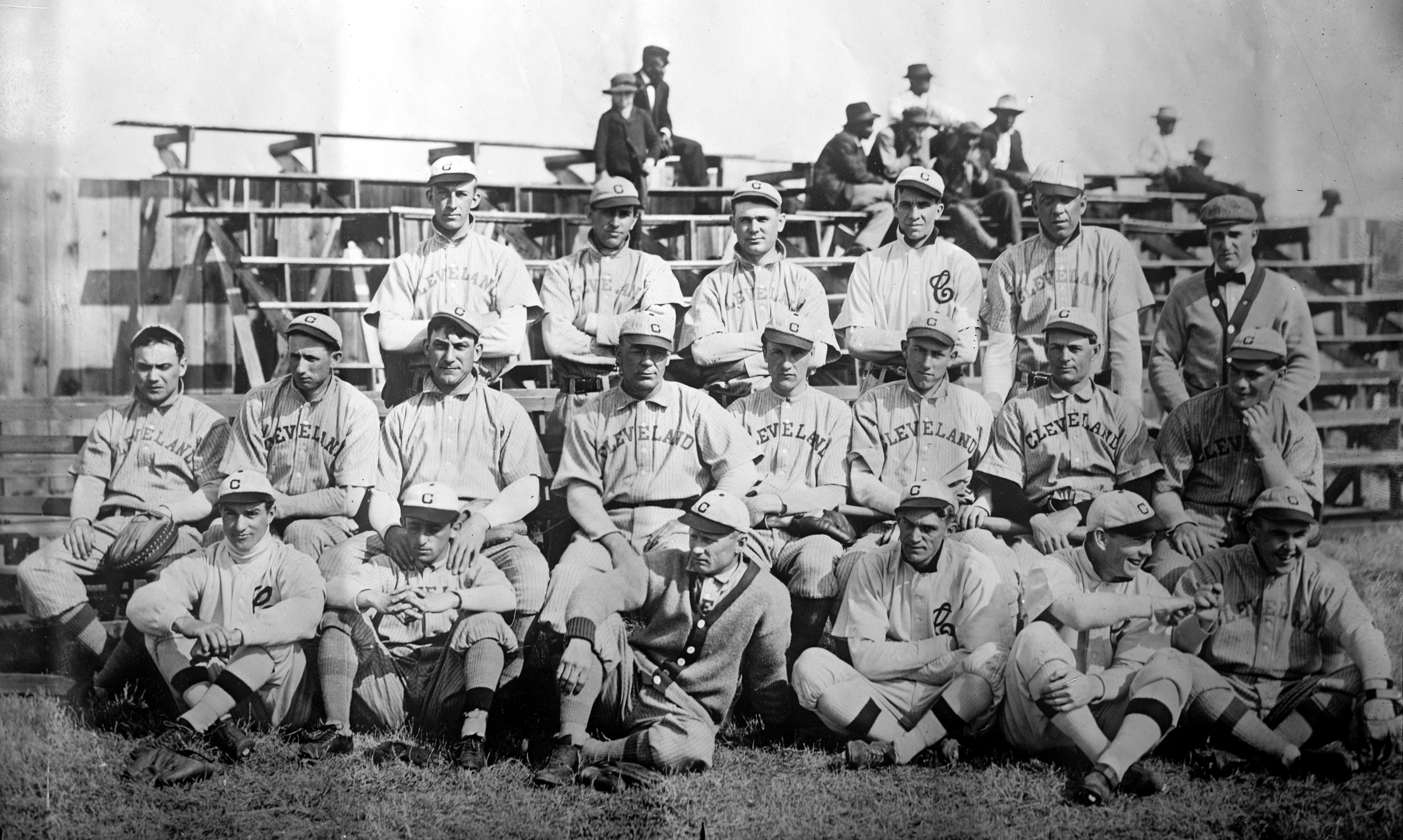
1909 Cleveland Naps

After that, the team began to unravel, leading Kilfoyl to sell his share of the team to Somers. Cy Young, who returned to Cleveland in 1909, was ineffective for most of his three remaining years and Addie Joss died from tubercular meningitis prior to the 1911 season.

Despite a strong lineup anchored by the potent Lajoie and Shoeless Joe Jackson, poor pitching kept the team below third place for most of the next decade. One reporter referred to the team as the Napkins, "because they fold up so easily". The team hit bottom in 1914 and 1915, finishing last place both years.

1915 brought significant changes to the team. Lajoie, nearly 40 years old, was no longer a top hitter in the league, batting only .258 in 1914. With Lajoie engaged in a feud with manager Joe Birmingham, the team sold Lajoie back to the A's.

With Lajoie gone, the club needed a new name. Somers asked the local baseball writers to come up with a new name, and based on their input, the team was renamed the Cleveland Indians. The name referred to the nickname "Indians" that was applied to the Cleveland Spiders baseball club during the time when Louis Sockalexis, a Native American, played in Cleveland (1897–1899).

At the same time, Somers' business ventures began to fail, leaving him deeply in debt. With the Indians playing poorly, attendance and revenue suffered. Somers decided to trade Jackson midway through the 1915 season for two players and $31,500, one of the largest sums paid for a player at the time.

By 1916, Somers was at the end of his tether, and sold the team to a syndicate headed by Chicago railroad contractor James C. "Jack" Dunn. Manager Lee Fohl, who had taken over in early 1915, acquired two minor league pitchers, Stan Coveleski and Jim Bagby and traded for center fielder Tris Speaker, who was engaged in a salary dispute with the Red Sox. All three would ultimately become key players in bringing a championship to Cleveland.

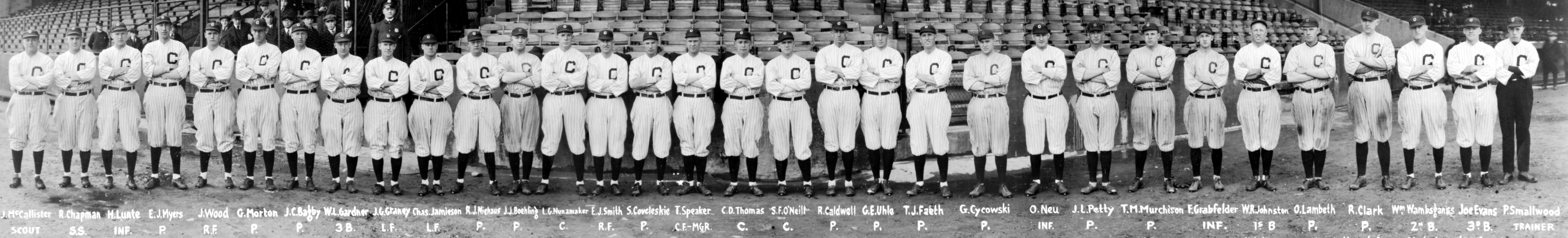
The 1920 Indians, who won the first World Series Championship in team history

Speaker took over the reins as player-manager in 1919, and led the team to a championship in 1920. On August 16, 1920, the Indians were playing the Yankees at the Polo Grounds in New York. Shortstop Ray Chapman, who often crowded the plate, was batting against Carl Mays, who had an unusual underhand delivery. It was also late in the afternoon and the infield was completely shaded with the center field area (the batters' background) bathed in sunlight. As well, at the time, "part of every pitcher's job was to dirty up a new ball the moment it was thrown onto the field. By turns, they smeared it with dirt, licorice, tobacco juice; it was deliberately scuffed, sandpapered, scarred, cut, even spiked. The result was a misshapen, earth-colored ball that traveled through the air erratically, tended to soften in the later innings, and as it came over the plate, was very hard to see."

In any case, Chapman did not move reflexively when Mays' pitch came his way. The pitch hit Chapman in the head, fracturing his skull. Chapman died the next day, becoming the only player to sustain a fatal injury from a pitched ball. The Indians, who at the time were locked in a tight three-way pennant race with the Yankees and White Sox, were not slowed down by the death of their teammate. Rookie Joe Sewell hit .329 after replacing Chapman in the lineup.

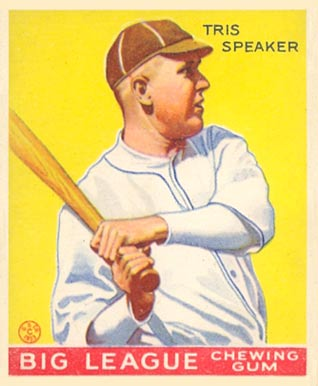
Tris Speaker on a 1933 baseball card

In September 1920, the Black Sox Scandal came to a boil. With just a few games left in the season, and Cleveland and Chicago neck-and-neck for first place at 94–54 and 95–56 respectively, the Chicago owner suspended eight players. The White Sox lost two of three in their final series, while Cleveland won four and lost two in their final two series. Cleveland finished two games ahead of Chicago and three games ahead of the Yankees to win its first pennant, led by Speaker's .388 hitting, Jim Bagby's 30 victories and solid performances from Steve O'Neill and Stan Coveleski. Cleveland went on to defeat the Brooklyn Robins 5–2 in the World Series for their first title, winning four games in a row after the Robins took a 2–1 Series lead. The Series included three memorable "firsts", all of them in Game 5 at Cleveland, and all by the home team. In the first inning, right fielder Elmer Smith hit the first Series grand slam. In the fourth inning, Jim Bagby hit the first Series home run by a pitcher. In the top of the fifth inning, second baseman Bill Wambsganss executed the first (and only, so far) unassisted triple play in World Series history, in fact, the only Series triple play of any kind.

The team would not reach the heights of 1920 again for 28 years. Speaker and Coveleski were aging and the Yankees were rising with a new weapon: Babe Ruth and the home run. They managed two second-place finishes but spent much of the decade in last place. In 1927 Dunn's widow, Mrs. George Pross (Dunn had died in 1922), sold the team to a syndicate headed by Alva Bradley.

=== 1936–1946: Bob Feller enters the show ===
The Indians were a middling team by the 1930s, finishing third or fourth most years. 1936 brought Cleveland a new superstar in 17-year-old pitcher Bob Feller, who came from Iowa with a dominating fastball. That season, Feller set a record with 17 strikeouts in a single game and went on to lead the league in strikeouts from 1938 to 1941.

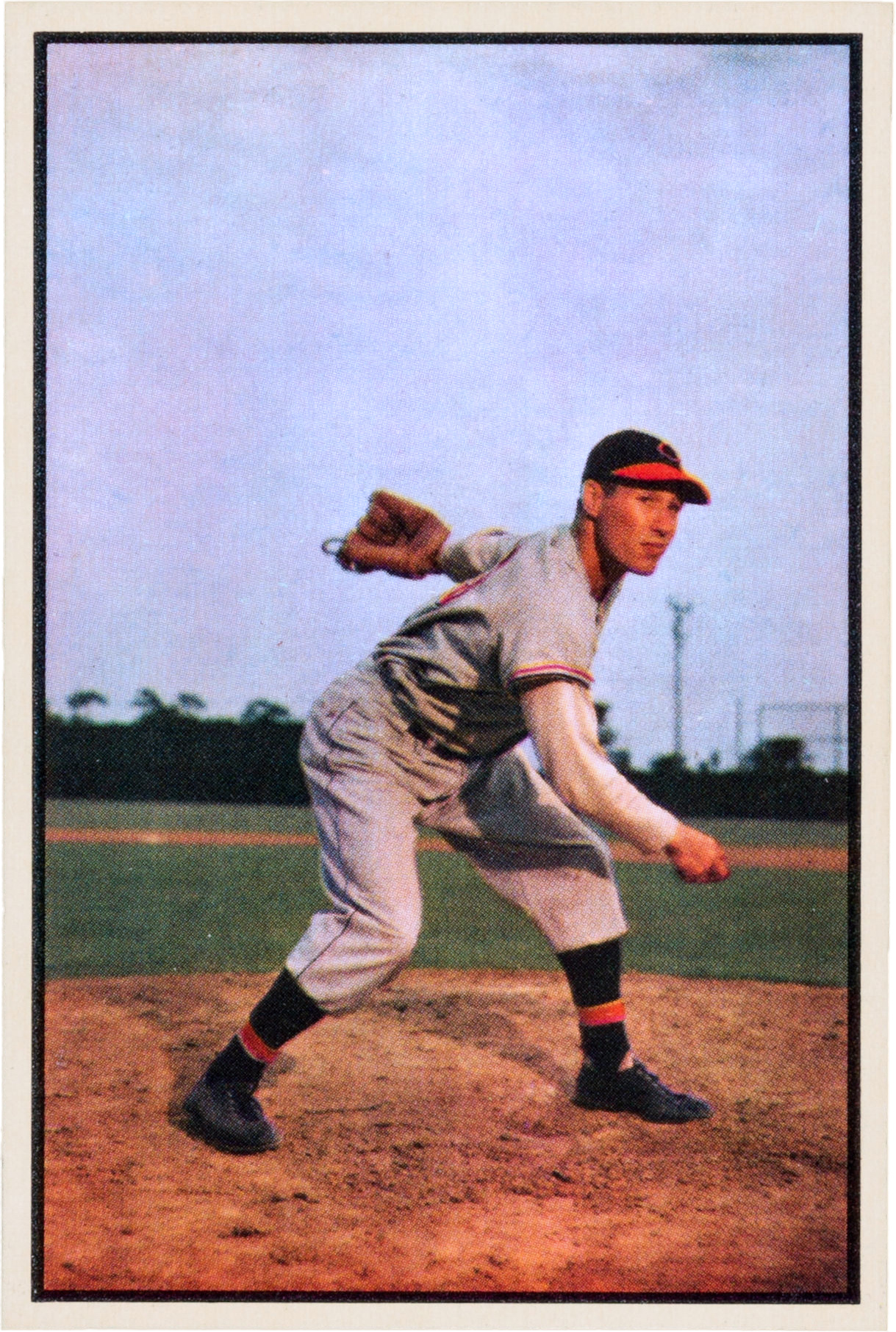
Bob Feller; winner of the A.L. pitching Triple Crown in 1940, member of the 1948 World Series Championship team, the Indians all-time leader in wins and strikeouts, and an MLB Hall of Famer

On August 20, 1938, Indians catchers Hank Helf and Frank Pytlak set the "all-time altitude mark" by catching baseballs dropped from the 708-foot (216 m) Terminal Tower.

By 1940, Feller, along with Ken Keltner, Mel Harder and Lou Boudreau, led the Indians to within one game of the pennant. However, the team was wracked with dissension, with some players (including Feller and Mel Harder) going so far as to request that Bradley fire manager Ossie Vitt. Reporters lampooned them as the Cleveland Crybabies. Feller, who had pitched a no-hitter to open the season and won 27 games, lost the final game of the season to unknown pitcher Floyd Giebell of the Detroit Tigers. The Tigers won the pennant and Giebell never won another major league game.

Cleveland entered 1941 with a young team and a new manager; Roger Peckinpaugh had replaced the despised Vitt; but the team regressed, finishing in fourth. Cleveland would soon be depleted of two stars. Hal Trosky retired in 1941 due to migraine headaches and Bob Feller enlisted in the Navy two days after the Attack on Pearl Harbor. Starting third baseman Ken Keltner and outfielder Ray Mack were both drafted in 1945 taking two more starters out of the lineup.

=== 1946–1949: The Bill Veeck years ===
In 1946, Bill Veeck formed an investment group that purchased the Cleveland Indians from Bradley's group for a reported $1.6 million. Among the investors was Bob Hope, who had grown up in Cleveland, and former Tigers slugger, Hank Greenberg. A former owner of a minor league franchise in Milwaukee, Veeck brought to Cleveland a gift for promotion. At one point, Veeck hired rubber-faced Max Patkin, the "Clown Prince of Baseball" as a coach. Patkin's appearance in the coaching box was the sort of promotional stunt that delighted fans but infuriated the American League front office.

Recognizing that he had acquired a solid team, Veeck soon abandoned the aging, small and lightless League Park to take up full-time residence in massive Cleveland Municipal Stadium. The Indians had briefly moved from League Park to Municipal Stadium in mid-1932, but moved back to League Park due to complaints about the cavernous environment. From 1937 onward, however, the Indians began playing an increasing number of games at Municipal, until by 1940 they played most of their home slate there. League Park was mostly demolished in 1951, but has since been rebuilt as a recreational park.

Making the most of the cavernous stadium, Veeck had a portable center field fence installed, which he could move in or out depending on how the distance favored the Indians against their opponents in a given series. The fence moved as much as 15 feet (5 m) between series opponents. Following the 1947 season, the American League countered with a rule change that fixed the distance of an outfield wall for the duration of a season. The massive stadium did, however, permit the Indians to set the then-record for the largest crowd to see a Major League baseball game. On October 10, 1948, Game 5 of the World Series against the Boston Braves drew over 84,000. The record stood until the Los Angeles Dodgers drew a crowd in excess of 92,500 to watch Game 5 of the 1959 World Series at the Los Angeles Memorial Coliseum against the Chicago White Sox.

Under Veeck's leadership, one of Cleveland's most significant achievements was breaking the color barrier in the American League by signing Larry Doby, formerly a player for the Negro league's Newark Eagles in 1947, 11 weeks after Jackie Robinson signed with the Dodgers. Similar to Robinson, Doby battled racism on and off the field but posted a .301 batting average in 1948, his first full season. A power-hitting center fielder, Doby led the American League twice in homers.

In 1948, needing pitching for the stretch run of the pennant race, Veeck turned to the Negro leagues again and signed pitching great Satchel Paige amid much controversy. Barred from Major League Baseball during his prime, Veeck's signing of the aging star in 1948 was viewed by many as another publicity stunt. At an official age of 42, Paige became the oldest rookie in Major League baseball history, and the first black pitcher. Paige ended the year with a 6–1 record with a 2.48 ERA, 45 strikeouts and two shutouts.

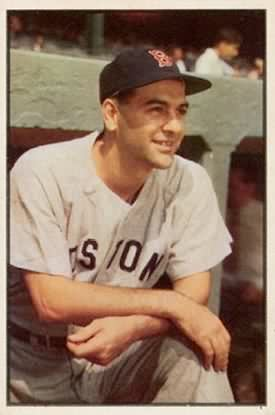
Lou Boudreau, 1948 American League MVP

In 1948, veterans Boudreau, Keltner, and Joe Gordon had career offensive seasons, while newcomers Doby and Gene Bearden also had standout seasons. The team went down to the wire with the Boston Red Sox, winning a one-game playoff, the first in American League history, to go to the World Series. In the series, the Indians defeated the Boston Braves four games to two for their first championship in 28 years. Boudreau won the American League MVP Award.

The Indians appeared in a film the following year titled The Kid From Cleveland, in which Veeck had an interest. The film portrayed the team helping out a "troubled teenaged fan" and featured many members of the Indians organization. However, filming during the season cost the players valuable rest days leading to fatigue towards the end of the season. That season, Cleveland again contended before falling to third place. On September 23, 1949, Bill Veeck and the Indians buried their 1948 pennant in center field the day after they were mathematically eliminated from the pennant race.

Later in 1949, Veeck's first wife (who had a half-stake in Veeck's share of the team) divorced him. With most of his money tied up in the Indians, Veeck was forced to sell the team to a syndicate headed by insurance magnate Ellis Ryan.

=== 1950–1959: Near misses ===
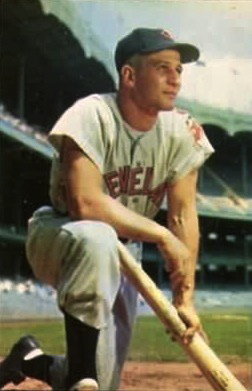
Al Rosen, 1953 Most Valuable Player

In 1953, Al Rosen was an All Star for the second year in a row, was named The Sporting News Major League Player of the Year, and won the American League Most Valuable Player Award in a unanimous vote playing for the Indians after leading the AL in runs, home runs, RBIs (for the second year in a row), and slugging percentage, and coming in second by one point in batting average. Ryan was forced out in 1953 in favor of Myron Wilson, who in turn gave way to William Daley in 1956. Despite this turnover in the ownership, a powerhouse team composed of Feller, Doby, Minnie Miñoso, Luke Easter, Bobby Ávila, Al Rosen, Early Wynn, Bob Lemon, and Mike Garcia continued to contend through the early 1950s. However, Cleveland only won a single pennant in the decade, in 1954, finishing second to the New York Yankees five times.

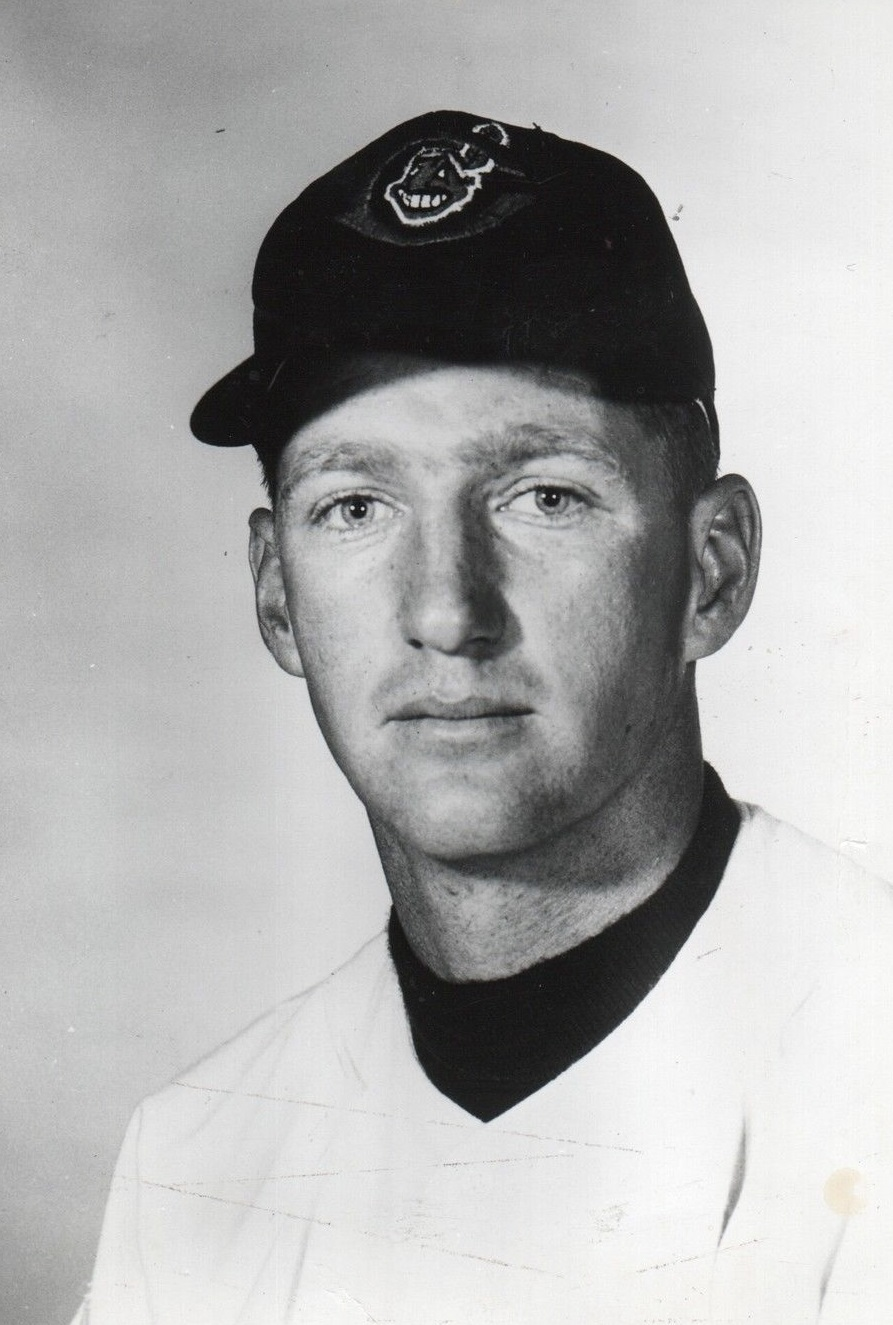
Herb Score – who was the 1955 American League Rookie of the Year, a two-time A.L. All-Star, and after his playing career was a member of the Indians broadcast team for 34 seasons (1964–1997).

The winningest season in franchise history came in 1954, when the Indians finished the season with a record of 111–43 (.721). That mark set an American League record for wins that stood for 44 years until the Yankees won 114 games in 1998 (a 162-game regular season record of 114-48/.704). The Indians' 1954 winning percentage of .721 is still an American League record. The Indians returned to the World Series to face the New York Giants. The team could not bring home the title, however, ultimately being upset by the Giants in a sweep. The series was notable for Willie Mays' over-the-shoulder catch off the bat of Vic Wertz in Game 1. Cleveland remained a talented team throughout the remainder of the decade, finishing in second place in 1959, George Strickland's last full year in the majors.

=== 1960–1993: The 33-year slump ===
From 1960 to 1993, the Indians managed one third-place finish (in 1968) and six fourth-place finishes (in 1960, 1974, 1975, 1976, 1990, and 1992) but spent the rest of the time at or near the bottom of the standings, including four seasons with over 100 losses (1971, 1985, 1987, 1991).

==== Frank Lane becomes general manager ====
The Indians hired general manager Frank Lane, known as "Trader" Lane, away from the St. Louis Cardinals in 1957. Lane over the years had gained a reputation as a GM who loved to make deals. With the White Sox, Lane had made over 100 trades involving over 400 players in seven years. In a short stint in St. Louis, he traded away Red Schoendienst and Harvey Haddix. Lane summed up his philosophy when he said that the only deals he regretted were the ones that he did not make.

One of Lane's early trades in Cleveland was to send Roger Maris to the Kansas City Athletics in the middle of 1958. Indians executive Hank Greenberg was not happy about the trade and neither was Maris, who said that he could not stand Lane. After Maris broke Babe Ruth's home run record, Lane defended himself by saying he still would have done the deal because Maris was unknown and he received good ballplayers in exchange.

After the Maris trade, Lane acquired 25-year-old Norm Cash from the White Sox for Minnie Miñoso and then traded him to Detroit before he ever played a game for the Indians; Cash went on to hit over 350 home runs for the Tigers. The Indians received Steve Demeter in the deal, who had only five at-bats for Cleveland.

==== Curse of Rocky Colavito ====
In 1960, Lane made the trade that would define his tenure in Cleveland when he dealt slugging right fielder and fan favorite Rocky Colavito to the Detroit Tigers for Harvey Kuenn just before Opening Day in 1960.

It was a blockbuster trade that swapped the 1959 AL home run co-champion (Colavito) for the AL batting champion (Kuenn). After the trade, however, Colavito hit over 30 home runs four times and made three All-Star teams for Detroit and Kansas City before returning to Cleveland in 1965. Kuenn, on the other hand, played only one season for the Indians before departing for San Francisco in a trade for an aging Johnny Antonelli and Willie Kirkland. Akron Beacon Journal columnist Terry Pluto documented the decades of woe that followed the trade in his book The Curse of Rocky Colavito. Despite being attached to the curse, Colavito said that he never placed a curse on the Indians but that the trade was prompted by a salary dispute with Lane.

Lane also engineered a unique trade of managers in mid-season 1960, sending Joe Gordon to the Tigers in exchange for Jimmy Dykes. Lane left the team in 1961, but ill-advised trades continued. In 1965, the Indians traded pitcher Tommy John, who would go on to win 288 games in his career, and 1966 Rookie of the Year Tommy Agee to the White Sox to get Colavito back.

However, Indians' pitchers set numerous strikeout records. They led the league in K's every year from 1963 to 1968, and narrowly missed in 1969. The 1964 staff was the first to amass 1,100 strikeouts, and in 1968, they were the first to collect more strikeouts than hits allowed.

==== Move to the AL East division ====
The 1970s were not much better, with the Indians trading away several future stars, including Graig Nettles, Dennis Eckersley, Buddy Bell and 1971 Rookie of the Year Chris Chambliss, for a number of players who made no impact.

Constant ownership changes did not help the Indians. In 1963, Daley's syndicate sold the team to a group headed by general manager Gabe Paul. Three years later, Paul sold the Indians to Vernon Stouffer, of the Stouffer Corporation empire. Prior to Stouffer's purchase, the team was rumored to be relocated due to poor attendance. Despite the potential for a financially strong owner, Stouffer had some non-baseball related financial setbacks and, consequently, the team was cash-poor. In order to solve some financial problems, Stouffer had made an agreement to play a minimum of 30 home games in New Orleans with a view to a possible move there. After rejecting an offer from George Steinbrenner and former Indian Al Rosen, Stouffer sold the team in 1972 to a group led by Cleveland Cavaliers and Cleveland Barons owner Nick Mileti. Steinbrenner went on to buy the New York Yankees in 1973.

Only five years later, Mileti's group sold the team for $11 million to a syndicate headed by trucking magnate Steve O'Neill and including former general manager and owner Gabe Paul. O'Neill's death in 1983 led to the team going on the market once more. O'Neill's nephew Patrick O'Neill did not find a buyer until real estate magnates Richard E. and David H. Jacobs purchased the team in 1986.

The team was unable to move out of last place, with losing seasons between 1969 and 1975. One highlight was the acquisition of Gaylord Perry in 1972. The Indians traded fireballer "Sudden Sam" McDowell for Perry, who became the first Indian pitcher to win the Cy Young Award. In 1975, Cleveland broke another color barrier with the hiring of Frank Robinson as Major League Baseball's first African American manager. Robinson served as player-manager and provided a franchise highlight when he hit a pinch-hit home run on Opening Day. But the high-profile signing of Wayne Garland, a 20-game winner in Baltimore, proved to be a disaster after Garland suffered from shoulder problems and went 28–48 over five years. The team failed to improve with Robinson as manager and he was fired in 1977. In 1977, pitcher Dennis Eckersley threw a no-hitter against the California Angels. The next season, he was traded to the Boston Red Sox where he won 20 games in 1978 and another 17 in 1979.

The 1970s also featured the infamous Ten Cent Beer Night at Cleveland Municipal Stadium. The ill-conceived promotion at a 1974 game against the Texas Rangers ended in a riot by fans and a forfeit by the Indians.

There were more bright spots in the 1980s. In May 1981, Len Barker threw a perfect game against the Toronto Blue Jays, joining Addie Joss as the only other Indian pitcher to do so. "Super Joe" Charboneau won the American League Rookie of the Year award. Charboneau was out of baseball by 1983 due to back injuries and Barker, who was also hampered by injuries, never became a consistently dominant starting pitcher.

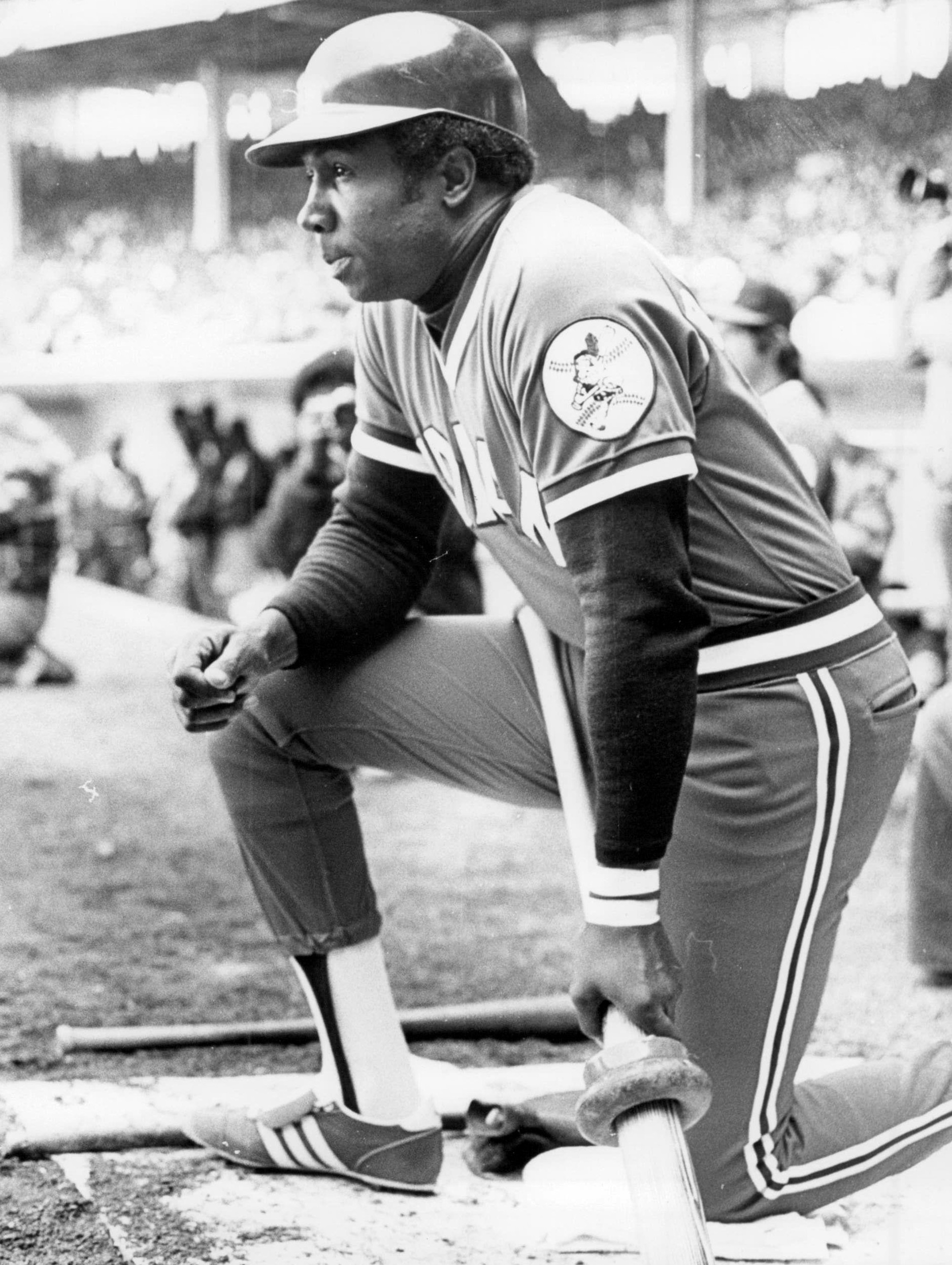
In 1975, Frank Robinson became the first African-American manager in MLB history.

Eventually, the Indians traded Barker to the Atlanta Braves for Brett Butler and Brook Jacoby, who became mainstays of the team for the remainder of the decade. Butler and Jacoby were joined by Joe Carter, Mel Hall, Julio Franco and Cory Snyder, bringing new hope to fans in the late 1980s.

Cleveland's struggles over the 30-year span were highlighted in the 1989 film Major League, which comically depicted a hapless Cleveland ball club going from worst to first by the end of the film.

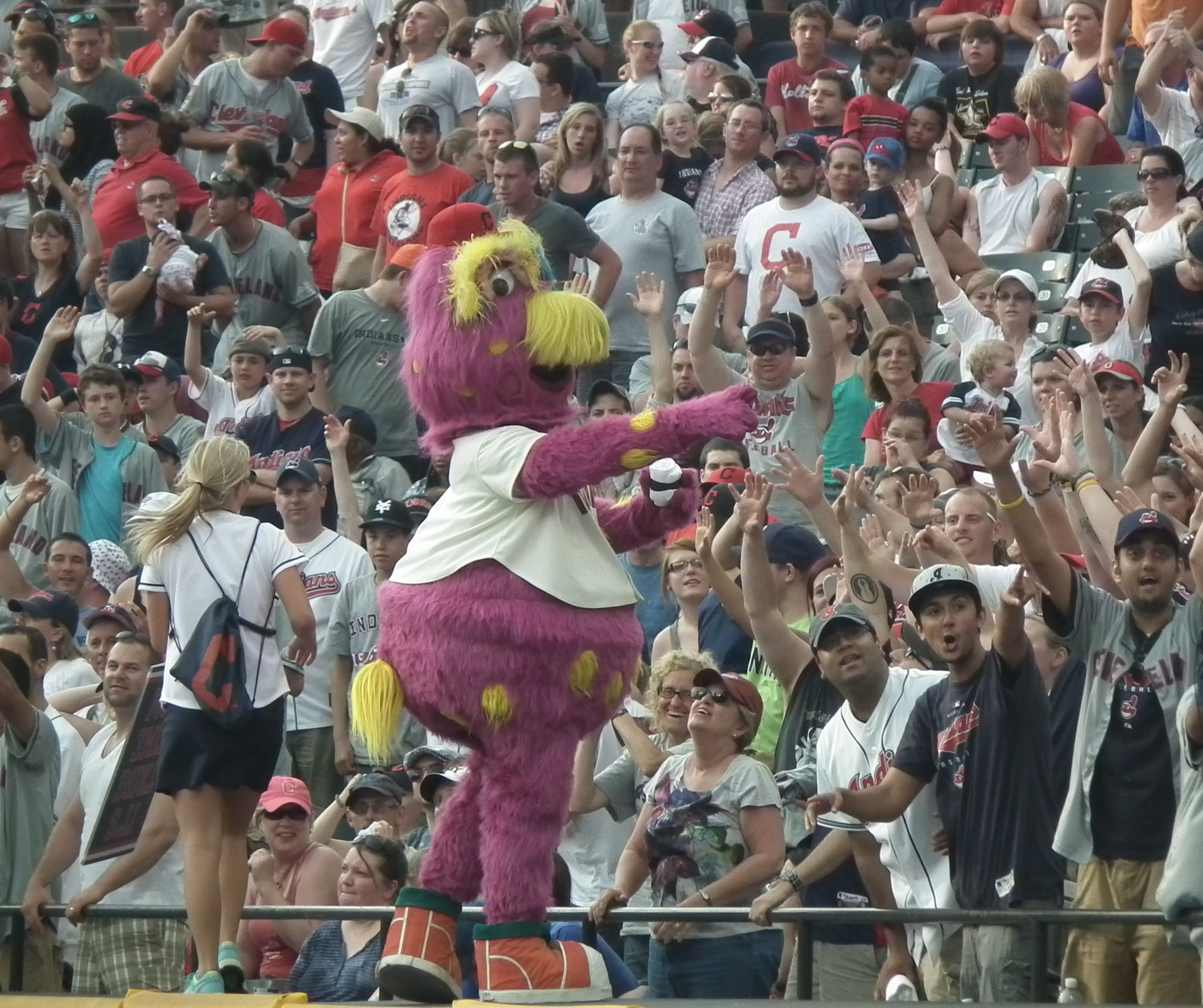
Slider, the team mascot since 1990

Throughout the 1980s, the Indians' owners had pushed for a new stadium. Cleveland Stadium had been a symbol of the Indians' glory years in the 1940s and 1950s. However, during the lean years even crowds of 40,000 were swallowed up by the cavernous environment. The old stadium was not aging gracefully; chunks of concrete were falling off in sections and the old wooden pilings were petrifying. In 1984, a proposal for a $150 million domed stadium was defeated in a referendum 2–1.

Finally, in May 1990, Cuyahoga County voters passed an excise tax on sales of alcohol and cigarettes in the county. The tax proceeds were to be used for financing the construction of the Gateway Sports and Entertainment Complex, which would include Jacobs Field for the Indians and Gund Arena for the Cleveland Cavs basketball team.

The team's fortunes started to turn in 1989, ironically with a very unpopular trade. The team sent power-hitting outfielder Joe Carter to the San Diego Padres for two unproven players, Sandy Alomar Jr. and Carlos Baerga. Alomar made an immediate impact, not only being elected to the All-Star team but also winning Cleveland's fourth Rookie of the Year award and a Gold Glove. Baerga became a three-time All-Star with consistent offensive production.

Indians general manager John Hart made a number of moves that finally brought success to the team. In 1991, he hired former Indian Mike Hargrove to manage and traded catcher Eddie Taubensee to the Houston Astros who, with a surplus of outfielders, were willing to part with Kenny Lofton. Lofton finished second in AL Rookie of the Year balloting with a .285 average and 66 stolen bases.

The Indians were named "Organization of the Year" by Baseball America in 1992, in response to the appearance of offensive bright spots and an improving farm system.

The team suffered a tragedy during spring training of 1993, when a boat carrying pitchers Steve Olin, Tim Crews, and Bob Ojeda crashed into a pier. Olin and Crews were killed, and Ojeda was seriously injured. (Ojeda missed most of the season, and retired the following year).

By the end of the 1993 season, the team was in transition, leaving Cleveland Stadium and fielding a talented nucleus of young players. Many of those players came from the Indians' new AAA farm team, the Charlotte Knights, who won the International League title that year.

=== 1994–2001: New beginnings ===
==== 1994: Jacobs Field opens ====
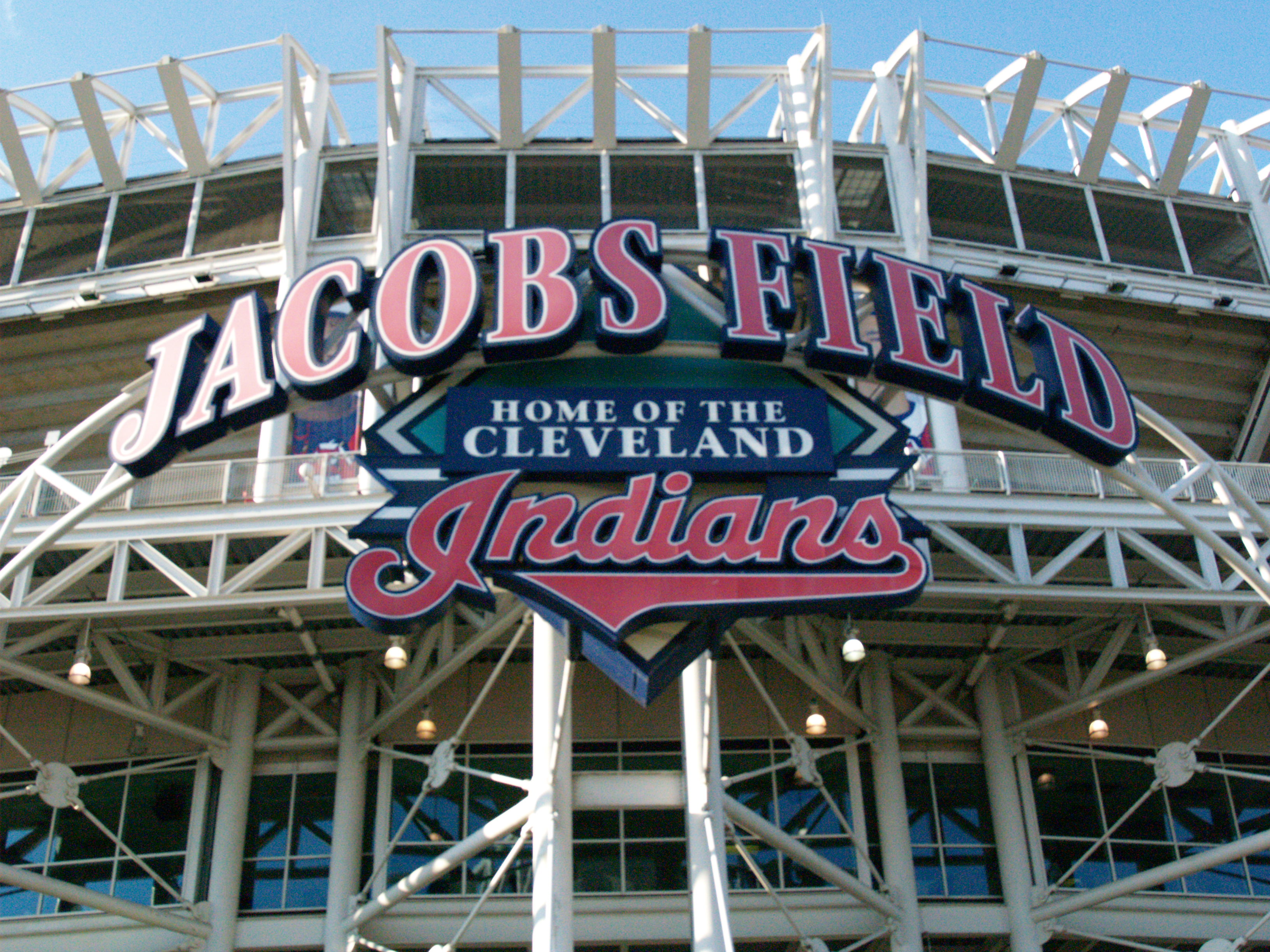
Jacobs Field sign pictured in 2006

Indians General Manager John Hart and team owner Richard E. Jacobs managed to turn the team's fortunes around. The Indians opened Jacobs Field in 1994 with the aim of improving on the prior season's sixth-place finish. The Indians were only one game behind the division-leading Chicago White Sox on August 12 when a players strike wiped out the rest of the season.

==== 1995–1996: First AL pennant since 1954 ====
Having contended for the division in the aborted 1994 season, Cleveland sprinted to a 100–44 record (the season was shortened by 18 games due to player/owner negotiations) in 1995, winning its first-ever divisional title. Veterans Dennis Martínez, Orel Hershiser and Eddie Murray combined with a young core of players including Omar Vizquel, Albert Belle, Jim Thome, Manny Ramírez, Kenny Lofton and Charles Nagy to lead the league in team batting average as well as team ERA.

After defeating the Boston Red Sox in the Division Series and the Seattle Mariners in the ALCS, Cleveland clinched the American League pennant and a World Series berth, for the first time since 1954. The World Series ended in disappointment, however: the Indians fell in six games to the Atlanta Braves.

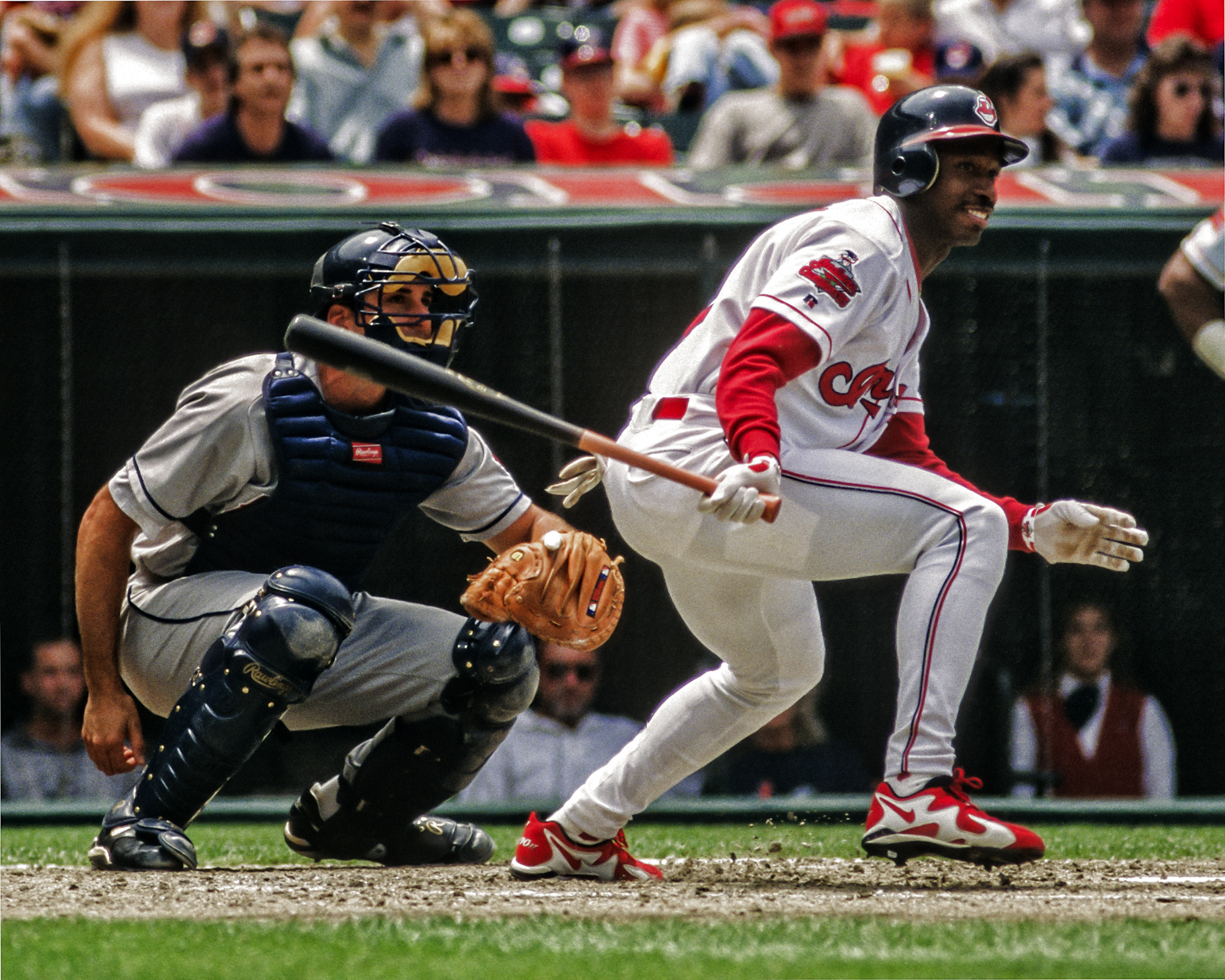
Kenny Lofton in 1996

Tickets for every Indians home game sold out several months before opening day in 1996. The Indians repeated as AL Central champions but lost to the wild card Baltimore Orioles in the Division Series.

==== 1997: Two outs away ====
In 1997, Cleveland started slow but finished with an 86–75 record. Taking their third consecutive AL Central title, the Indians defeated the New York Yankees in the Division Series, 3–2. After defeating the Baltimore Orioles in the ALCS, Cleveland went on to face the Florida Marlins in the World Series that featured the coldest game in World Series history. With the series tied after Game 6, the Indians went into the ninth inning of Game Seven with a 2–1 lead, but closer José Mesa allowed the Marlins to tie the game. In the eleventh inning, Édgar Rentería drove in the winning run giving the Marlins their first championship. Cleveland became the first team to lose the World Series after carrying the lead into the ninth inning of the seventh game.

==== 1998–2001 ====
In 1998, the Indians made the postseason for the fourth straight year. After defeating the wild-card Boston Red Sox 3–1 in the Division Series, Cleveland lost the 1998 ALCS in six games to the New York Yankees, who had come into the postseason with a then-AL record 114 wins in the regular season.

For the 1999 season, Cleveland added relief pitcher Ricardo Rincón and second baseman Roberto Alomar, brother of catcher Sandy Alomar Jr., and won the Central Division title for the fifth consecutive year. The team scored 1,009 runs, becoming the first (and to date only) team since the 1950 Boston Red Sox to score more than 1,000 runs in a season. This time, Cleveland did not make it past the first round, losing the Division Series to the Red Sox, despite taking a 2–0 lead in the series. In game three, Indians starter Dave Burba went down with an injury in the 4th inning. Four pitchers, including presumed game four starter Jaret Wright, surrendered nine runs in relief. Without a long reliever or emergency starter on the playoff roster, Hargrove started both Bartolo Colón and Charles Nagy in games four and five on only three days rest. The Indians lost game four 23–7 and game five 12–8. Four days later, Hargrove was dismissed as manager.

In 2000, the Indians had a 44–42 start, but caught fire after the All Star break and went 46–30 the rest of the way to finish 90–72. The team had one of the league's best offenses that year and a defense that yielded three gold gloves. However, they ended up five games behind the Chicago White Sox in the Central division and missed the wild card by one game to the Seattle Mariners. Mid-season trades brought Bob Wickman and Jake Westbrook to Cleveland. After the season, free-agent outfielder Manny Ramírez departed for the Boston Red Sox.

In 2000, Larry Dolan bought the Indians for $320 million from Richard E. Jacobs, who, along with his late brother David, had paid $45 million for the club in 1986. The sale set a record at the time for the sale of a baseball franchise.

2001 saw a return to the postseason. After the departures of Ramírez and Sandy Alomar Jr., the Indians signed Ellis Burks and former MVP Juan González, who helped the team win the Central division with a 91–71 record. One of the highlights came on August 5, when the Indians completed the biggest comeback in MLB History. Cleveland rallied to close a 14–2 deficit in the seventh inning to defeat the Seattle Mariners 15–14 in 11 innings. The Mariners, who won an MLB record-tying 116 games that season, had a strong bullpen, and Indians manager Charlie Manuel had already pulled many of his starters with the game seemingly out of reach.

Seattle and Cleveland met in the first round of the postseason; however, the Mariners won the series 3–2. In the 2001–02 offseason, GM John Hart resigned and his assistant, Mark Shapiro, took the reins.

=== 2002–2010: The Shapiro/Wedge years ===
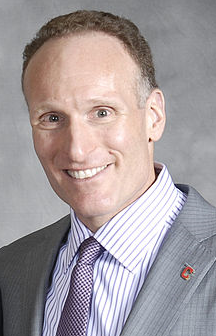
Mark Shapiro – Indians GM from 2001 to 2010, President from 2010 to 2015, and two-time Sporting News Executive of the Year

==== First "rebuilding of the team" ====
Shapiro moved to rebuild by dealing aging veterans for younger talent. He traded Roberto Alomar to the New York Mets for a package that included outfielder Matt Lawton and prospects Alex Escobar and Billy Traber. When the team fell out of contention in mid-2002, Shapiro fired manager Charlie Manuel and traded pitching ace Bartolo Colón for prospects Brandon Phillips, Cliff Lee, and Grady Sizemore; acquired Travis Hafner from the Rangers for Ryan Drese and Einar Díaz; and picked up Coco Crisp from the St. Louis Cardinals for aging starter Chuck Finley. Jim Thome left after the season, going to the Phillies for a larger contract.

Young Indians teams finished far out of contention in 2002 and 2003 under new manager Eric Wedge. They posted strong offensive numbers in 2004, but continued to struggle with a bullpen that blew more than 20 saves. A highlight of the season was a 22–0 victory over the New York Yankees on August 31, one of the worst defeats suffered by the Yankees in team history.

In early 2005, the offense got off to a poor start. After a brief July slump, the Indians caught fire in August, and cut a 15.5 game deficit in the Central Division down to 1.5 games. However, the season came to an end as the Indians went on to lose six of their last seven games, five of them by one run, missing the playoffs by only two games. Shapiro was named Executive of the Year in 2005. The next season, the club made several roster changes, while retaining its nucleus of young players. The off-season was highlighted by the acquisition of top prospect Andy Marte from the Boston Red Sox. The Indians had a solid offensive season, led by career years from Travis Hafner and Grady Sizemore. Hafner, despite missing the last month of the season, tied the single season grand slam record of six, which was set in 1987 by Don Mattingly. Despite the solid offensive performance, the bullpen struggled with 23 blown saves (a Major League worst), and the Indians finished a disappointing fourth.

In 2007, Shapiro signed veteran help for the bullpen and outfield in the offseason. Veterans Aaron Fultz and Joe Borowski joined Rafael Betancourt in the Indians bullpen. The Indians improved significantly over the prior year and went into the All-Star break in second place. The team brought back Kenny Lofton for his third stint with the team in late July. The Indians finished with a 96–66 record tied with the Red Sox for best in baseball, their seventh Central Division title in 13 years and their first postseason trip since 2001.

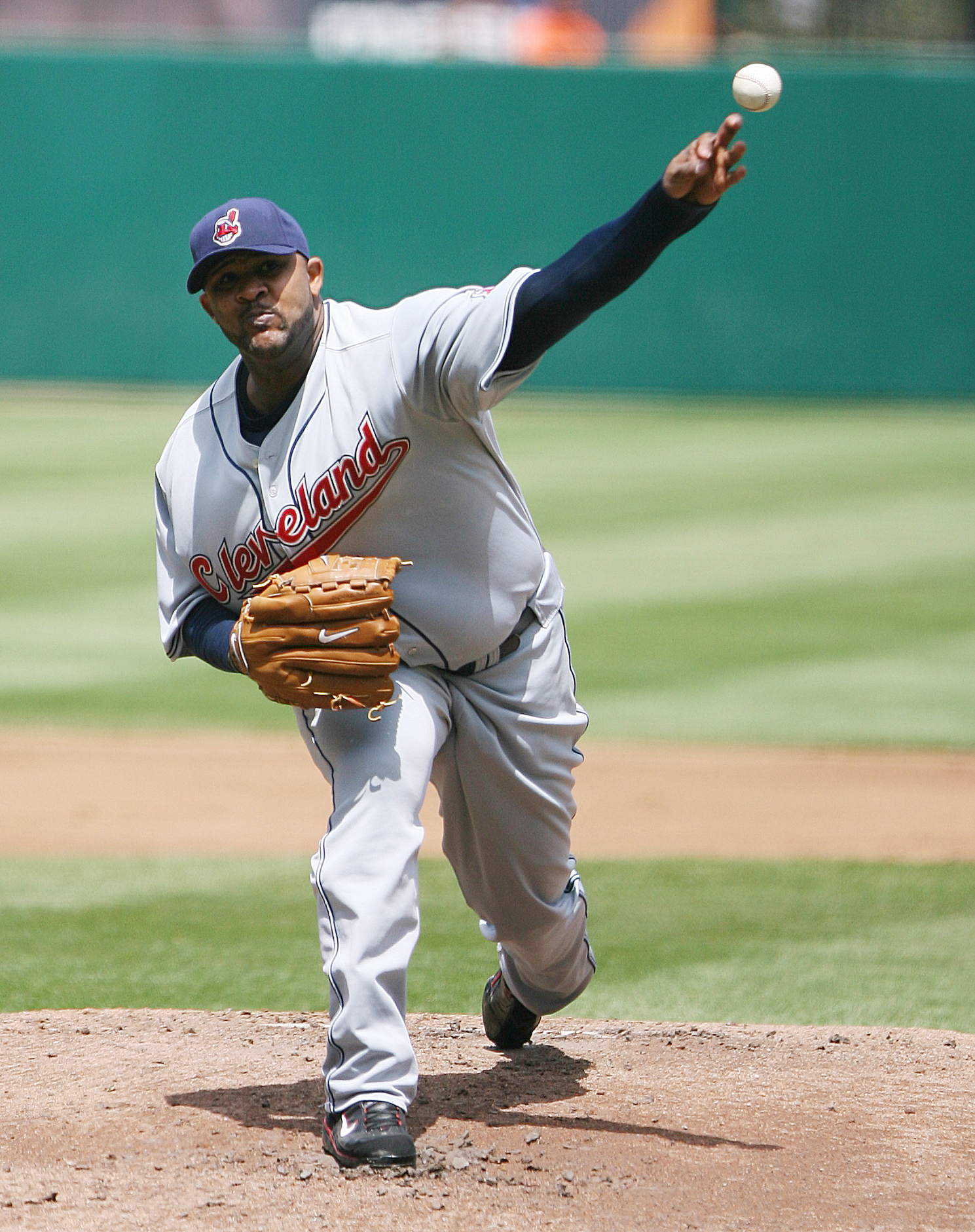
CC Sabathia won the 2007 AL Cy Young Award with the Indians.

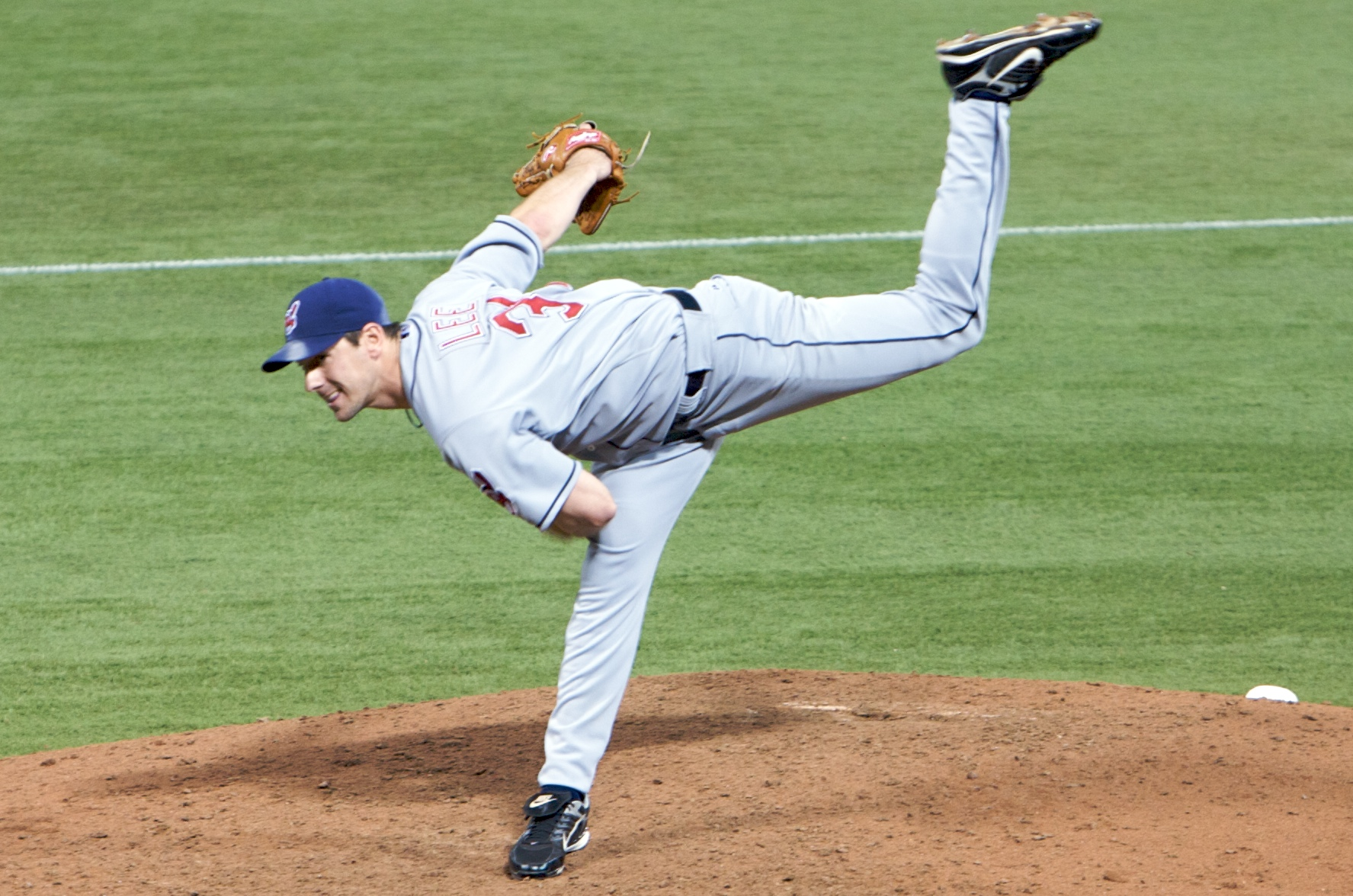
Sabathia's teammate Cliff Lee won the AL Cy Young Award in 2008.

The Indians began their playoff run by defeating the Yankees in the ALDS three games to one. This series will be most remembered for the swarm of bugs that overtook the field in the later innings of Game Two. They also jumped out to a three-games-to-one lead over the Red Sox in the ALCS. The season ended in disappointment when Boston swept the final three games to advance to the 2007 World Series.

Despite the loss, Cleveland players took home a number of awards. Grady Sizemore, who had a .995 fielding percentage and only two errors in 405 chances, won the Gold Glove award, Cleveland's first since 2001. Indians Pitcher CC Sabathia won the second Cy Young Award in team history with a 19–7 record, a 3.21 ERA and an MLB-leading 241 innings pitched. Eric Wedge was awarded the first Manager of the Year Award in team history. Shapiro was named to his second Executive of the Year in 2007.

==== Second "rebuilding of the team" ====
The Indians struggled during the 2008 season. Injuries to sluggers Travis Hafner and Victor Martinez, as well as starting pitchers Jake Westbrook and Fausto Carmona led to a poor start. The Indians, falling to last place for a short time in June and July, traded CC Sabathia to the Milwaukee Brewers for prospects Matt LaPorta, Rob Bryson, and Michael Brantley. and traded starting third baseman Casey Blake for catching prospect Carlos Santana. Pitcher Cliff Lee went 22–3 with an ERA of 2.54 and earned the AL Cy Young Award. Grady Sizemore had a career year, winning a Gold Glove Award and a Silver Slugger Award, and the Indians finished with a record of 81–81.

Prospects for the 2009 season dimmed early when the Indians ended May with a record of 22–30. Shapiro made multiple trades: Cliff Lee and Ben Francisco to the Philadelphia Phillies for prospects Jason Knapp, Carlos Carrasco, Jason Donald and Lou Marson; Victor Martinez to the Boston Red Sox for prospects Bryan Price, Nick Hagadone and Justin Masterson; Ryan Garko to the Texas Rangers for Scott Barnes; and Kelly Shoppach to the Tampa Bay Rays for Mitch Talbot. The Indians finished the season tied for fourth in their division, with a record of 65–97. The team announced on September 30, 2009, that Eric Wedge and all of the team's coaching staff were released at the end of the 2009 season. Manny Acta was hired as the team's 40th manager on October 25, 2009.

On February 18, 2010, it was announced that Shapiro (following the end of the 2010 season) would be promoted to team President, with current President Paul Dolan becoming the new Chairman/CEO, and longtime Shapiro assistant Chris Antonetti filling the GM role.

=== 2011–present: Antonetti/Chernoff/Francona era ===
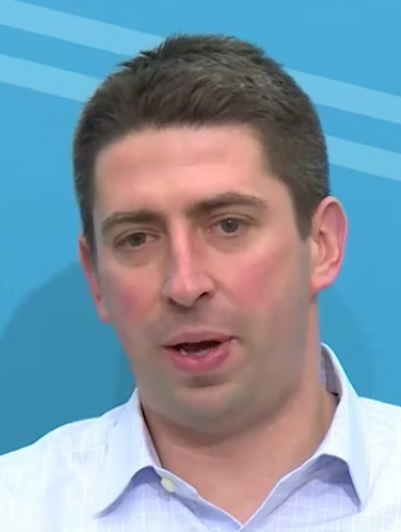
Mike Chernoff, who has served as Indians/Guardians' general manager since 2015

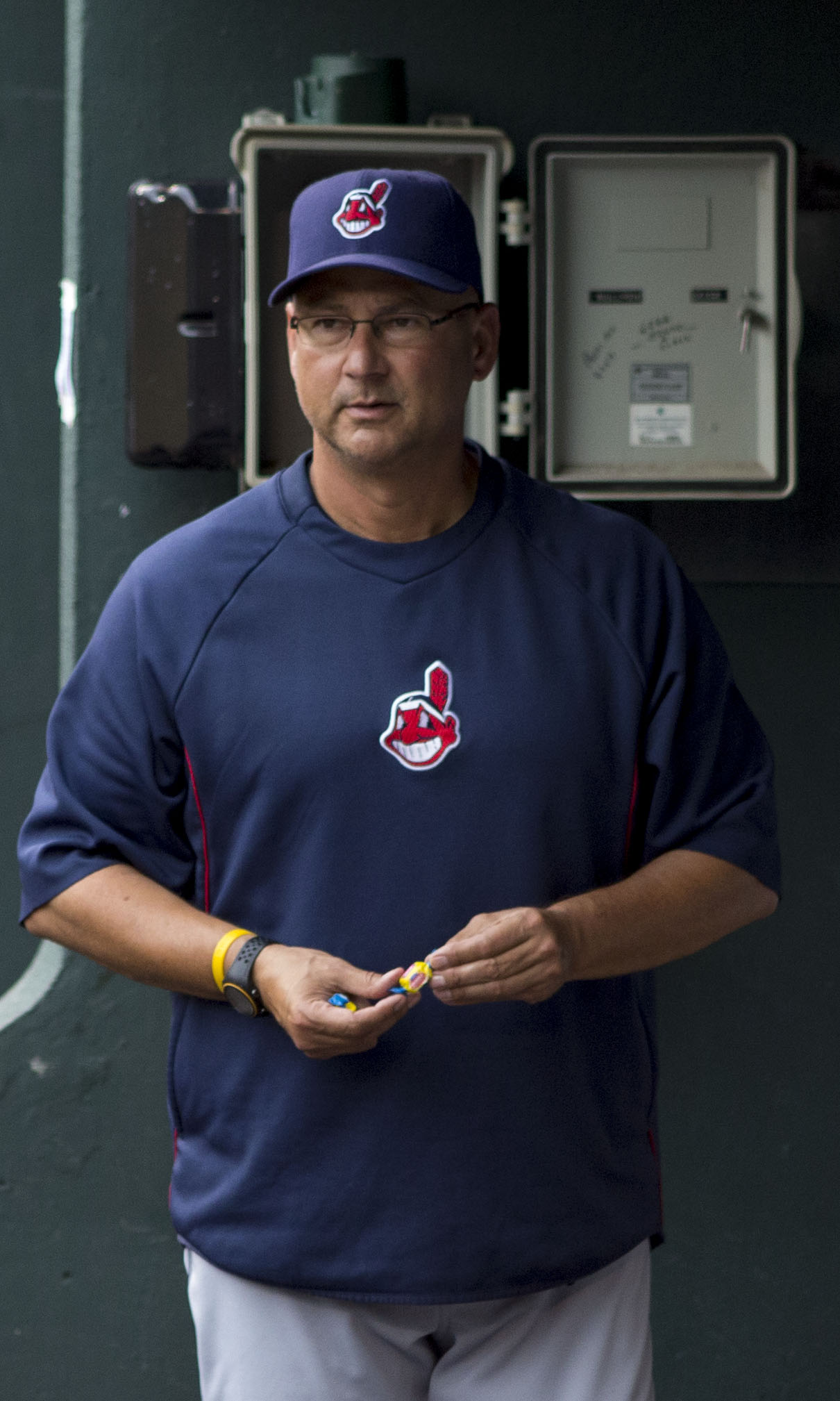
Former manager Terry Francona, who in his tenure with the Indians/Guardians (2013–2023) was a three-time AL Manager of the Year (2013, 2016, 2022), led the team to the 2016 AL Championship, and is the all-time franchise leader in wins by a manager

On January 18, 2011, longtime popular former first baseman and manager Mike Hargrove was brought in as a special adviser. The Indians started the 2011 season strong – going 30–15 in their first 45 games and seven games ahead of the Detroit Tigers for first place. Injuries led to a slump where the Indians fell out of first place. Many minor leaguers such as Jason Kipnis and Lonnie Chisenhall got opportunities to fill in for the injuries. The biggest news of the season came on July 30 when the Indians traded four prospects for Colorado Rockies star pitcher, Ubaldo Jiménez. The Indians sent their top two pitchers in the minors, Alex White and Drew Pomeranz along with Joe Gardner and Matt McBride. On August 25, the Indians signed the team leader in home runs, Jim Thome off of waivers. He made his first appearance in an Indians uniform since he left Cleveland after the 2002 season. To honor Thome, the Indians placed him at his original position, third base, for one pitch against the Minnesota Twins on September 25. It was his first appearance at third base since 1996, and his last for Cleveland. The Indians finished the season in 2nd place, 15 games behind the division champion Tigers.

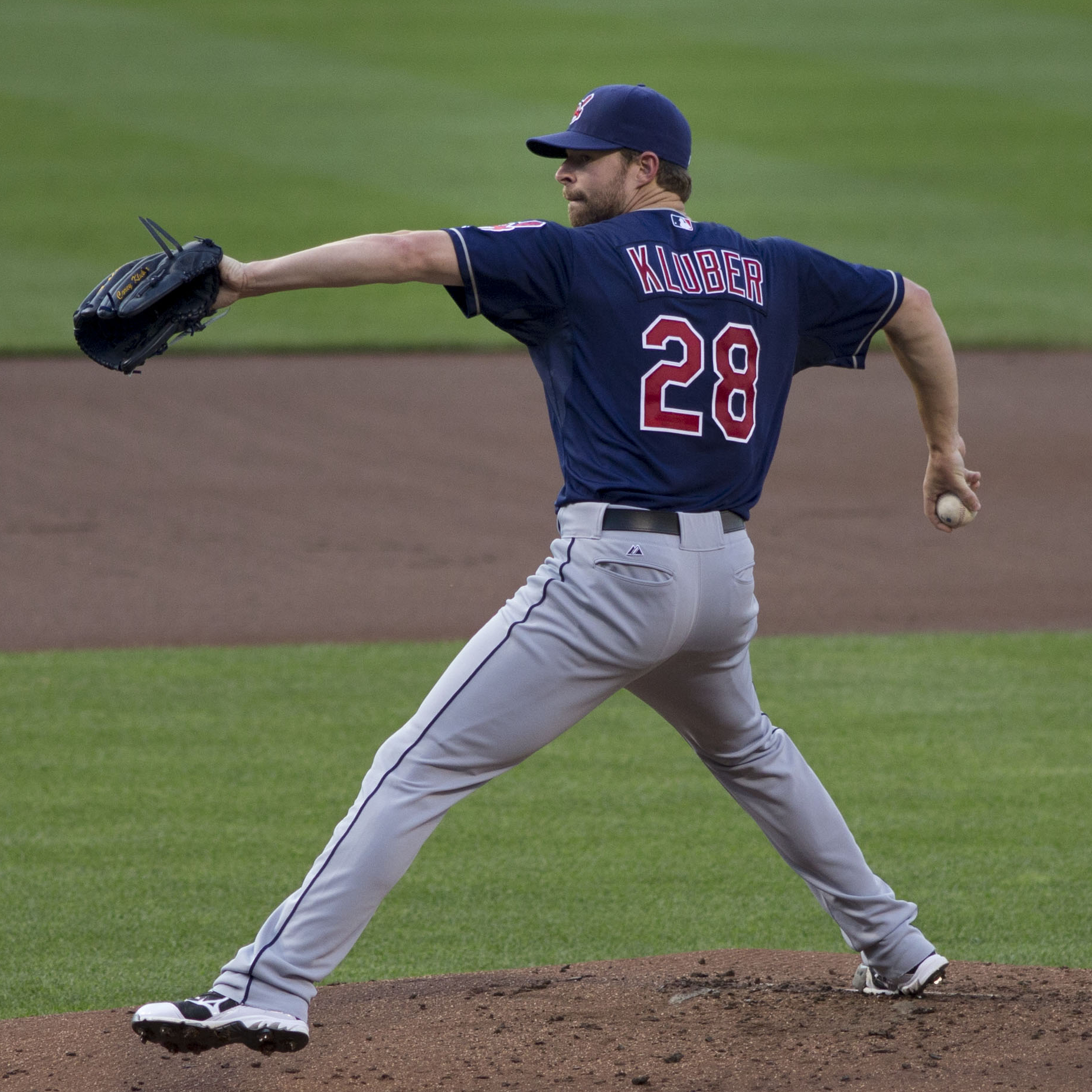
Corey Kluber, who is a two-time AL Cy Young Award winner with the Indians (2014, 2017)

The Indians broke Progressive Field's Opening Day attendance record with 43,190 against the Toronto Blue Jays on April 5, 2012. The game went 16 innings, setting the MLB Opening Day record, and lasted 5 hours and 14 minutes.

On September 27, 2012, with six games left in the Indians' 2012 season, Manny Acta was fired; Sandy Alomar Jr. was named interim manager for the remainder of the season. On October 6, the Indians announced that Terry Francona, who managed the Boston Red Sox to five playoff appearances and two World Series between 2004 and 2011, would take over as manager for 2013.

The Indians entered the 2013 season following an active offseason of dramatic roster turnover. Key acquisitions included free agent 1B/OF Nick Swisher and CF Michael Bourn. The team added prized right-handed pitching prospect Trevor Bauer, OF Drew Stubbs, and relief pitchers Bryan Shaw and Matt Albers in a three-way trade with the Arizona Diamondbacks and Cincinnati Reds that sent RF Shin-Soo Choo to the Reds, and Tony Sipp to the Arizona Diamondbacks. Other notable additions included utility man Mike Avilés, catcher Yan Gomes, designated hitter Jason Giambi, and starting pitcher Scott Kazmir. The 2013 Indians increased their win total by 24 over 2012 (from 68 to 92), finishing in second place, one game behind Detroit in the Central division, but securing the number one seed in the American League Wild Card Standings. In their first postseason appearance since 2007, Cleveland lost the 2013 American League Wild Card Game 4–0 at home to Tampa Bay. Francona was recognized for the turnaround with the 2013 American League Manager of the Year Award.

With an 85–77 record, the 2014 Indians had consecutive winning seasons for the first time since 1999–2001, but they were eliminated from playoff contention during the last week of the season and finished third in the AL Central.

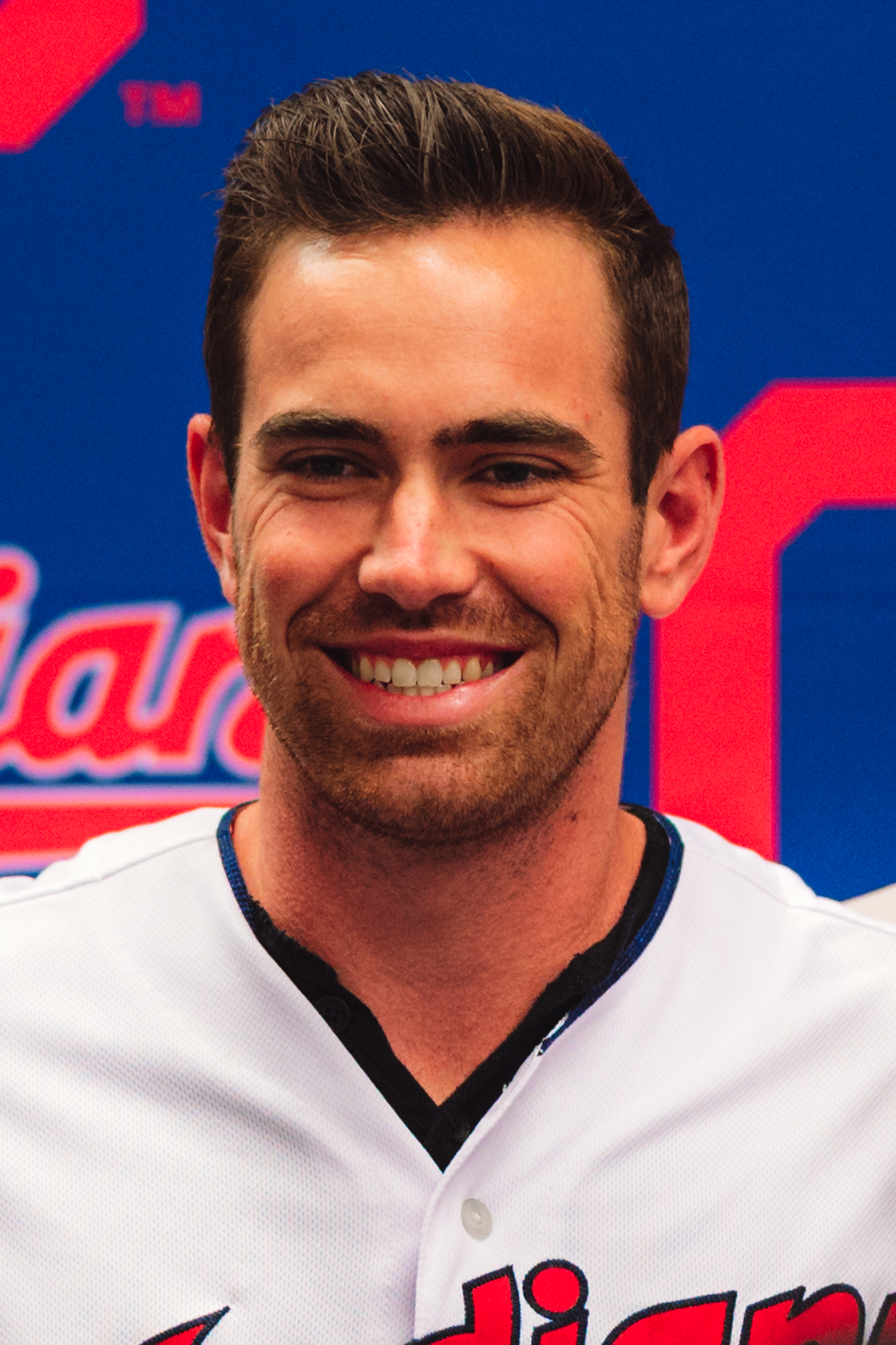
Shane Bieber, who won the 2020 AL Cy Young Award, giving the team five winners in 14 seasons

In 2015, after struggling through the first half of the season, the Indians finished 81–80 for their third consecutive winning season, which the team had not done since 1999–2001. For the second straight year, the Tribe finished third in the Central and was eliminated from the Wild Card race during the last week of the season. Following the departure of longtime team executive Mark Shapiro on October 6, the Indians promoted GM Chris Antonetti to President of Baseball Operations, assistant general manager Mike Chernoff to GM, and named Derek Falvey as assistant GM. Falvey was later hired by the Minnesota Twins in 2016, becoming their President of Baseball Operations.

The Indians set what was then a franchise record for longest winning streak when they won their 14th consecutive game, a 2–1 win over the Toronto Blue Jays in 19 innings on July 1, 2016, at Rogers Centre. The team clinched the Central Division pennant on September 26, their eighth division title overall and first since 2007, as well as returning to the playoffs for the first time since 2013. They finished the regular season at 94–67, marking their fourth straight winning season, a feat not accomplished since the 1990s and early 2000s.

The Indians began the 2016 postseason by sweeping the Boston Red Sox in the best-of-five American League Division Series, then defeated the Blue Jays in five games in the 2016 American League Championship Series to claim their sixth American League pennant and advance to the World Series against the Chicago Cubs. It marked the first appearance for the Indians in the World Series since 1997 and first for the Cubs since 1945. The Indians took a 3–1 series lead following a victory in Game 4 at Wrigley Field, but the Cubs rallied to take the final three games and won the series 4 games to 3. The Indians' 2016 success led to Francona winning his second AL Manager of the Year Award with the club.

From August 24 through September 15 during the 2017 season, the Indians set a new American League record by winning 22 games in a row. On September 28, the Indians won their 100th game of the season, marking only the third time in history the team has reached that milestone. They finished the regular season with 102 wins, second-most in team history (behind 1954's 111 win team). The Indians earned the AL Central title for the second consecutive year, along with home-field advantage throughout the American League playoffs, but they lost the 2017 ALDS to the Yankees 3–2 after being up 2–0.

In 2018, the Indians won their third consecutive AL Central crown with a 91–71 record, but were swept in the 2018 American League Division Series by the Houston Astros, who outscored Cleveland 21–6. In 2019, despite a two-game improvement, the Indians missed the playoffs as they trailed three games behind the Tampa Bay Rays for the second AL Wild Card berth. During the 2020 season (shortened to 60 games because of the COVID-19 pandemic), the Indians were 35–25, finishing second behind the Minnesota Twins in the AL Central, but qualified for the expanded playoffs. In the best-of-three AL Wild Card Series, the Indians were swept by the New York Yankees, ending their season.

In February 2025, Larry Dolan, who owned the team since the year 2000 and served as the longest owner in the history of the Cleveland franchise, died. His son Paul, who is listed as the team's "Owner/CEO/Chairman," has held ownership duties over the team since 2013, and is also the only of Larry Dolan's children who has held major leadership roles over the Guardians. In May 2026, Cleveland Heights native and NFL football player Travis Kelce became a minority owner.

==== Guardians rebranding ====
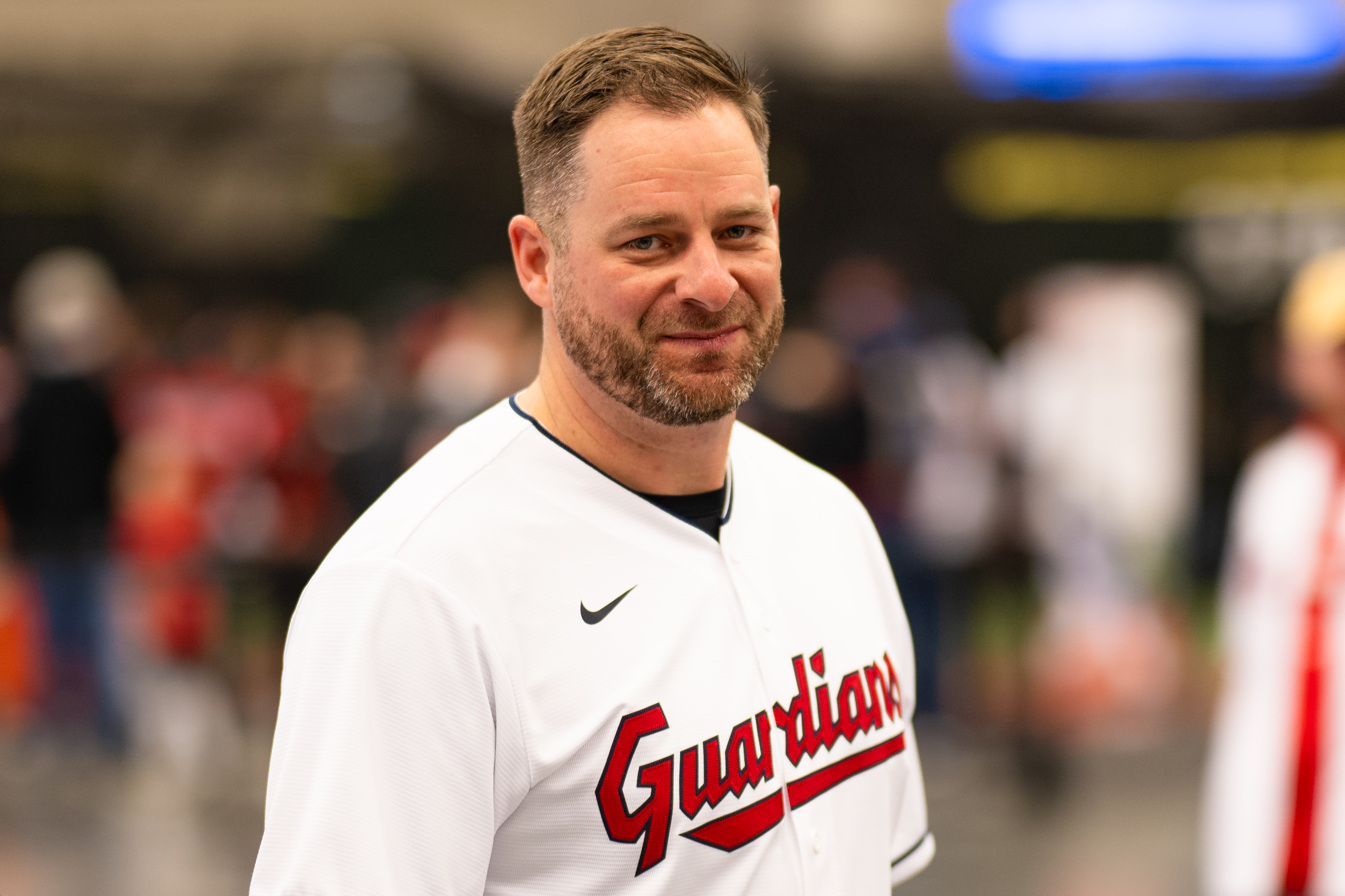
Current manager Stephen Vogt, who has led the team to three A.L. Central titles, and is a two-time A.L. Manager of the Year (2024 and 2025)

On December 18, 2020, the team announced that the Indians name and logo would be dropped after the 2021 season, later revealing the replacement to be the Guardians. In their first season as the Guardians, the team won the 2022 AL Central Division crown, marking the 11th division title in franchise history. In the best-of-three AL Wild Card Series, the Guardians won the series against the Tampa Bay Rays 2–0, to advance to the AL Division Series. The Guardians lost the series to the New York Yankees 3–2, ending their season. In June 2022, sports investor David Blitzer bought a 25% stake in the franchise with an option to acquire controlling interest in 2028.

Following Francona's retirement at the end of the 2023 season, the Guardians named Stephen Vogt as their new manager on November 6, 2023. Vogt would lead the Guardians to a bounce-back season, winning the AL Central with a 92–69 record. The Guardians would beat their AL Central rival the Detroit Tigers in the AL Division Series in five games, but would lose to the New York Yankees in the AL Pennant in five games.

In 2025, Vogt led the team back from a 15.5 game deficit in July, to overtake Detroit and win the second straight AL Central title under his watch.

In 2026, the Guardians would three-peat as Central Division champions, marking Vogt's third division title in as many years as manager.

== Rivalries ==
=== Cincinnati Reds ===
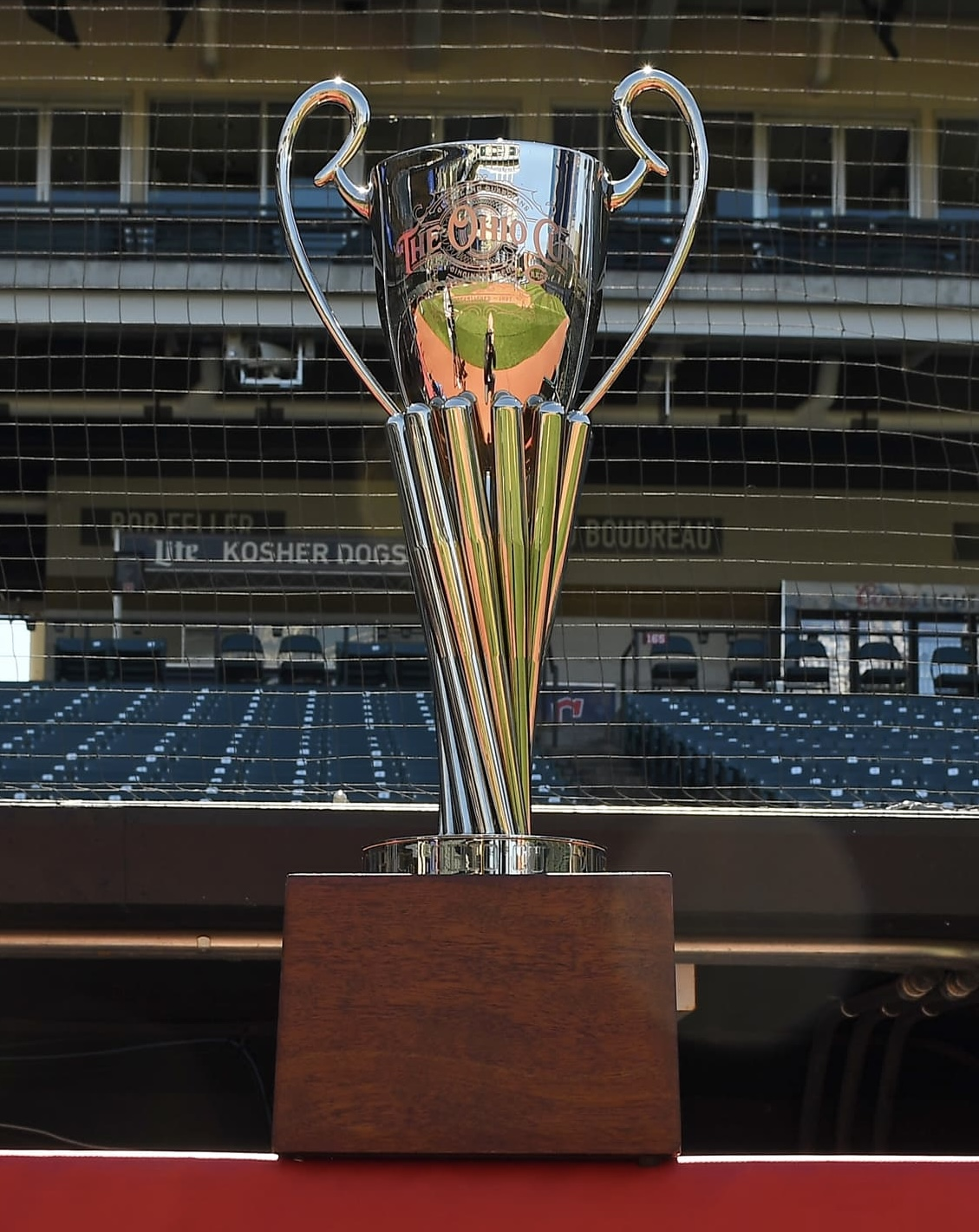
The Ohio Cup trophy

The rivalry with fellow Ohio team the Cincinnati Reds is known as the Battle of Ohio or Buckeye Series and features the Ohio Cup trophy for the winner. Prior to 1997, the winner of the cup was determined by an annual pre-season baseball game, played each year at minor-league Cooper Stadium in the state capital of Columbus, and staged just days before the start of each new Major League Baseball season. A total of eight Ohio Cup games were played, with the Guardians winning six of them. It ended with the start of interleague play in 1997. The winner of the game each year was awarded the Ohio Cup in postgame ceremonies. The Ohio Cup was a favorite among baseball fans in Columbus, with attendances regularly topping 15,000.

Since 1997, the two teams have played each other as part of the regular season, with the exception of 2002. The Ohio Cup was reintroduced in 2008 and is presented to the team who wins the most games in the series that season. Initially, the teams played one three-game series per season, meeting in Cleveland in 1997 and Cincinnati the following year. The teams have played two series per season against each other since 1999, with the exception of 2002, one at each ballpark. A format change in 2013 made each series two games, except in years when the AL and NL Central divisions meet in interleague play, where it is usually extended to three games per series. As of June 2025, the Guardians lead the series 77–64.

=== Divisional ===
==== Detroit Tigers ====
The Guardians share a rivalry with the Detroit Tigers fueled by geographic proximity between the two cities, and elements from the intense rivalry between Michigan and Ohio State. The rivalry with came to a head on August 7, 2013, with the teams first and second in the AL Central standings. Many Tigers fans who made the short trip to Cleveland started a "Let's go Tigers!" chant while the game was tied in the nith inning. Cleveland fans countered with a "Detroit's bankrupt!" chant, in reference to the city's 2013 bankruptcy. Footage of the chants from SportsTime Ohio circulated online, with many baseball fans on social media criticizing Cleveland fans for the chant due to the circumstances of Detroit's financial situation. The Tigers ended up defeating Cleveland 6–5 in 14 innings. The two teams have played almost evenly over their 125-year history with Detroit holding a narrow 1,168–1,167 lead. The teams have met twice in the postseason, with Cleveland winning the 2024 AL Division Series and Detroit winning the 2025 AL Wild Card Series.

==== Chicago White Sox ====
The Chicago White Sox are another rival, dating back to the 1959 season, when the Sox slipped past the Indians to win the AL pennant. The rivalry intensified when both clubs were moved to the newly created AL Central in 1994. During that season, the two teams challenged for the division title, with the Indians one game back of Chicago when the season ended in August due to the players' strike. During a game in Chicago, the White Sox confiscated Albert Belle's corked bat, followed by an attempt by Indians pitcher Jason Grimsley to crawl through the Comiskey Park clubhouse ceiling to retrieve it. Belle later signed with the White Sox in 1997, adding additional intensity to the rivalry. In 2005, the White Sox led the division by 15 games in July, only to see the Indians trim the lead to a single game late in the season. However, the White Sox swept a three-game series to end the season to win the division by six games; the Sox later won that year's World Series.

On August 5, 2023, Cleveland third baseman José Ramírez and Chicago shortstop Tim Anderson instigated a bench-clearing brawl after Anderson applied a tag to Ramírez. Anderson then attempted to punch Ramírez, after which Ramírez wound up knocking Anderson to the ground with a right hook. Anderson and Ramírez were suspended five and two games, respectively, for their roles in the brawl.

== Uniforms ==
The official team colors are navy blue, red, and white.

Guardians wordmark logo, featured on the team's standard white home jerseys

=== Home ===
The primary home uniform is white with red and navy blue piping around each sleeve. Across the front of the jersey in script font is the word "Guardians" in red with a navy blue outline, with navy blue undershirts, belts, and socks.

The alternate home jersey is red with a navy blue "diamond C" font "Guardians" trimmed in white on the front, and white and navy blue piping on both sleeves, with navy blue undershirts, belts, and socks.

Cleveland in "diamond C" font is featured on the team's standard grey road uniform.

In 2024, the team introduced "City Connect" uniforms, primarily (but not exclusively) worn on Friday home dates. The jerseys are blue with red and white stripes going down the sleeve, featuring "CLE" on the front of the jersey and the player names and numbers on the back (all in a white art deco style font), with sandstone colored pants and red socks featuring a logo which was also introduced in 2024 (a "Guardians of Traffic" statue holding a baseball bat).

The standard home cap is red with a navy blue bill, and features a navy blue "diamond C" on the front and is worn with the primary white uniforms. With the alternate red jerseys, the cap is navy blue with a red bill and red "diamond C". The "City Connect" home cap is similar to the alternate cap with the exception of the front section over the bill being white.

=== Road ===
The primary road uniform is gray, with "Cleveland" in navy blue "diamond C" letters, trimmed in red across the front of the jersey, red and navy blue piping around the sleeves, and navy blue undershirts, belts, and socks.

The alternate road jersey is navy blue with a red "diamond C" trimmed in white on the front of the jersey, red and white piping around the sleeves, and navy blue undershirts, belts, and socks.

With either road jersey, the team wears a navy blue cap with a red bill and red "diamond C".

=== Universal ===
For all games, the team uses a navy blue batting helmet with a red "diamond C" on the front.

All jerseys (sans the "City Connect" version) feature the "winged G" logo on one sleeve, and every jersey has a patch from Marathon Petroleum – in a sponsorship deal lasting through the 2026 season – on the other. The sleeve featuring the Marathon logo depends on how the player bats – left handed hitters have it on their right sleeve, as that is the arm facing the main TV camera when he bats, and vice versa for right handed batters.

== Former name and logo controversy ==
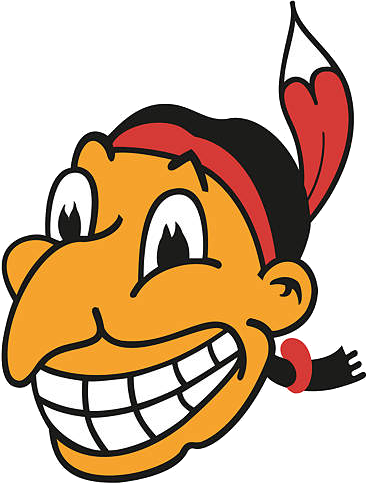
Logo from 1946 to 1950

Chief Wahoo logo used from 1949 through 2018

"Block C" logo used secondarily from 2014 until 2019, then as the team's primary logo from 2019 through 2021 – the final three years under the Indians name

The team's former name, Indians, and its corresponding mascot, a caricatured man known as Chief Wahoo, were criticized for perpetuating stereotypes of Native Americans. In 1997 and 1998, protesters were arrested after effigies were burned. Charges were dismissed in the 1997 case, and were not filed in the 1998 case. Protesters arrested in the 1998 incident subsequently fought and lost a lawsuit alleging that their First Amendment rights had been violated.

In 2014, Commissioner of Baseball Bud Selig noted that he had never directly received a complaint about the Indians' logo. He recommended that teams using indigenous imagery, including the Indians and Atlanta Braves, make their own decisions about continuing to do so. On Opening Day in 2015, the hundredth anniversary of the team becoming the Indians, a group of Native Americans protested Chief Wahoo. Owner Paul Dolan acknowledged the criticism, but stated that the mascot would not be going anywhere.

On January 29, 2018, Major League Baseball announced that Chief Wahoo would be removed from the Indians' uniforms for the 2019 season, stating that the logo was no longer appropriate for on-field use. The block "C" was promoted to the primary logo; at the time, there were no plans to change the team's name.

In 2020, protests over the murder of George Floyd, a black man, by a Minneapolis police officer led Dolan to reconsider the Indians' name. On July 3, on the heels of the announcement that the Washington Redskins would "undergo a thorough review" of that team's name, the Indians announced that they would "determine the best path forward" regarding their name, and emphasized the need to "keep improving as an organization on issues of social justice". On December 13, it was reported that the Indians name would be dropped after the 2021 season out of respect for the Native American community. It was hinted by the team that they would remain that way, as was true of the Washington Football Team (formerly the Redskins) until they became the Commanders in 2022.

It was announced via Twitter on July 23, 2021, that the team would be renamed the Guardians, after the Guardians of Traffic, eight large Art Deco statues on the Hope Memorial Bridge near Progressive Field. This became the subject of a legal dispute. Not only had there been two applications to trademark the name Cleveland Guardians, there was already a sports team called the Cleveland Guardians, competing in the Men's Roller Derby Association since 2016. Seeking to avert what they perceived as further brand confusion, and alleging deceptive tactics by the baseball team, on October 27, the roller derby team filed a lawsuit in the U.S. District Court for the Northern District of Ohio. On November 16, the teams came to a settlement, with both being allowed to call themselves the Guardians. The baseball team's name change became official three days later.

== Media ==
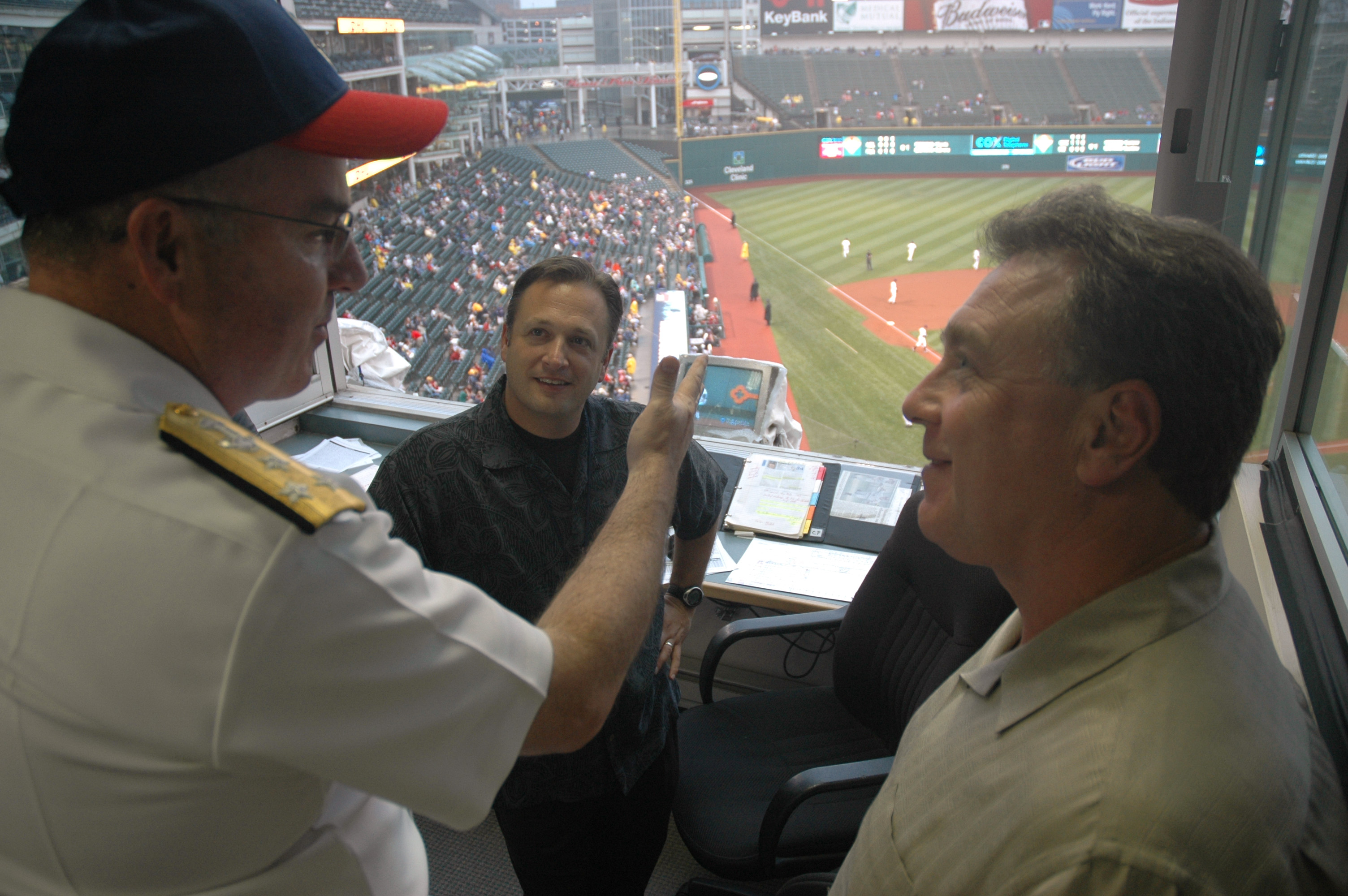
Guardians TV announcer Matt Underwood (seated, center) and longtime lead radio announcer Tom Hamilton (right)

=== Radio ===
Cleveland radio stations WTAM (1100 AM and 106.9 FM) and WMMS (100.7 FM), both owned by iHeartMedia, serve as flagship stations for the Cleveland Guardians Radio Network. Ford C. Frick Award winner Tom Hamilton and Jim Rosenhaus comprise the announcing team and call all games on-site.

Fellow sister station WARF (1350 AM) - while primarily an English language station - serves as the team's Spanish flagship, airing broadcasts of home games. Rafa Hernández-Brito serves as the primary Spanish announcer, alongside analyst and former Indian Carlos Baerga.

=== TV ===
Regular season games not broadcast by MLB's national TV partners are shown exclusively on Guardians TV, operated by MLB Local Media, which launched on February 11, 2025. Cleveland NBC affiliate WKYC channel 3 simulcasts select games, plus airs a weekly team centered sportscast titled Guardians Tonight Sunday nights.

Lead announcer Matt Underwood, analyst and former Indians Gold Glove-winning centerfielder Rick Manning, and field reporter Andre Knott form the TV broadcast team, with Al Pawlowski hosting the pre- and postgame shows, alongside former Indian Chris Gimenez serving as analyst, with various other former Indians/Guardians making guest appearances. Guardians TV airs on cable systems throughout Northeast Ohio, as well as functioning as a streaming service.

=== Past announcers ===
Notable former broadcasters include Tom Manning, Jack Graney (the first ex-baseball player to become a play-by-play announcer), Ken Coleman, Joe Castiglione, Van Patrick, Nev Chandler, Bruce Drennan, Jim "Mudcat" Grant, Rocky Colavito, Dan Coughlin, and Jim Donovan.

Previous broadcasters who have had lengthy tenures with the team include Joe Tait (15 seasons between TV and radio), Jack Corrigan (18 seasons on TV), Ford C. Frick Award winner Jimmy Dudley (19 seasons on radio), Mike Hegan (23 seasons between TV and radio), and Herb Score (34 seasons between TV and radio).

== Popular culture ==
Under the Cleveland Indians name, the team has been featured in several films, including:

- The Kid from Cleveland – a 1949 film featuring then-owner Bill Veeck and numerous players from the team (coming off winning the 1948 World Series).
- Major League – a 1989 film centered around a fictionalized version of the Indians.
- Major League II – a 1994 sequel to the 1989 original.

== Awards and honors ==
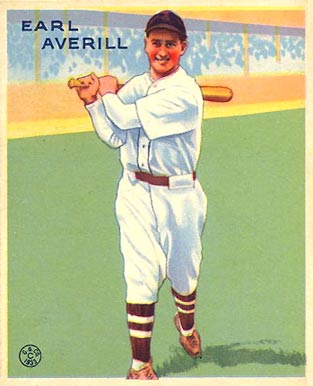
Earl Averill

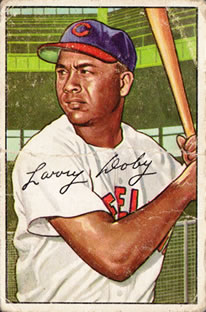
Larry Doby

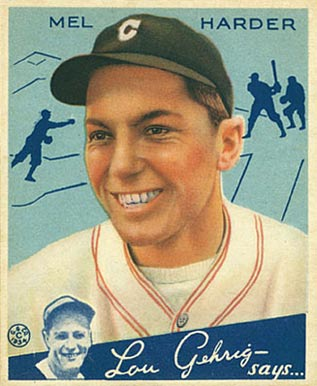
Mel Harder

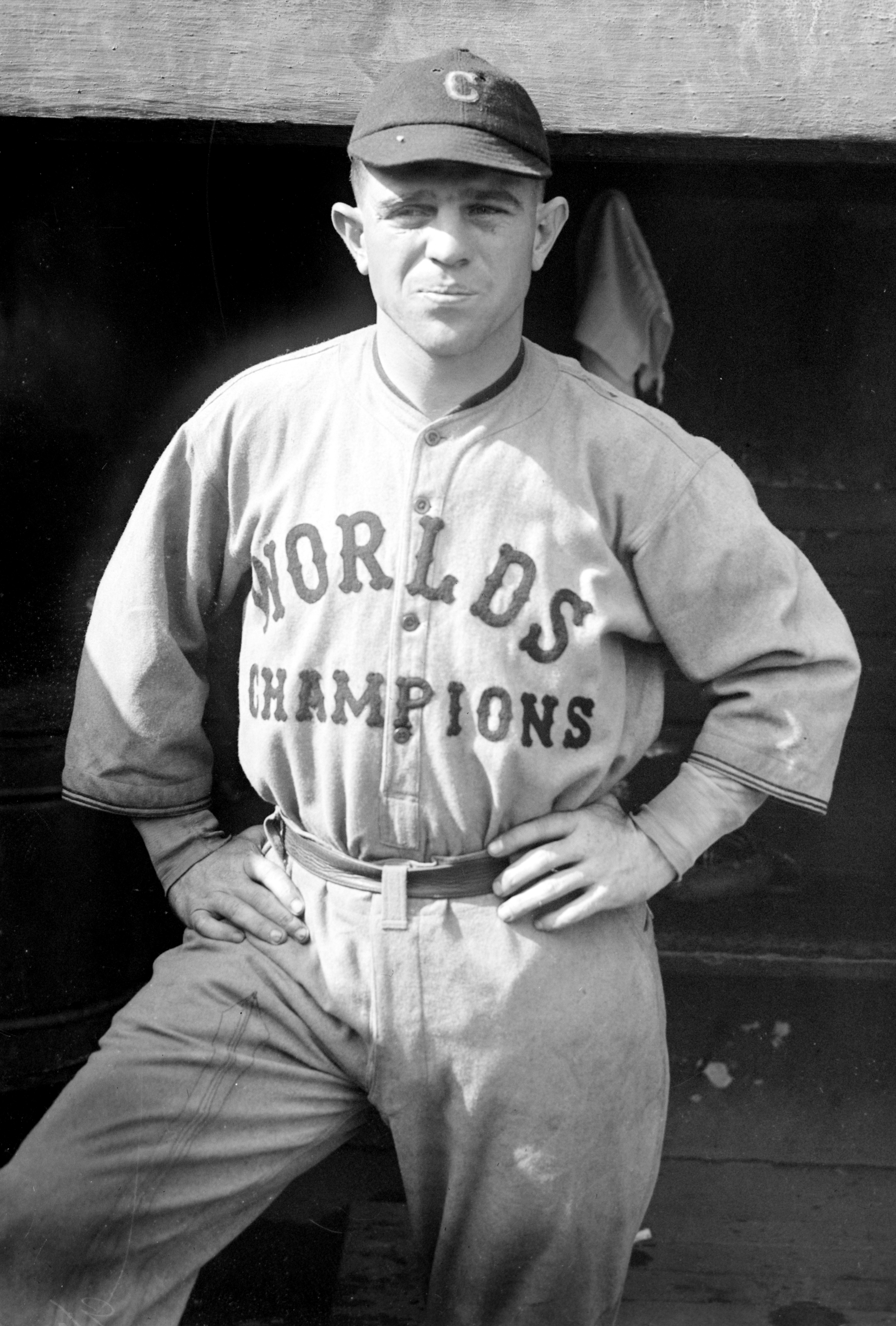
Joe Sewell

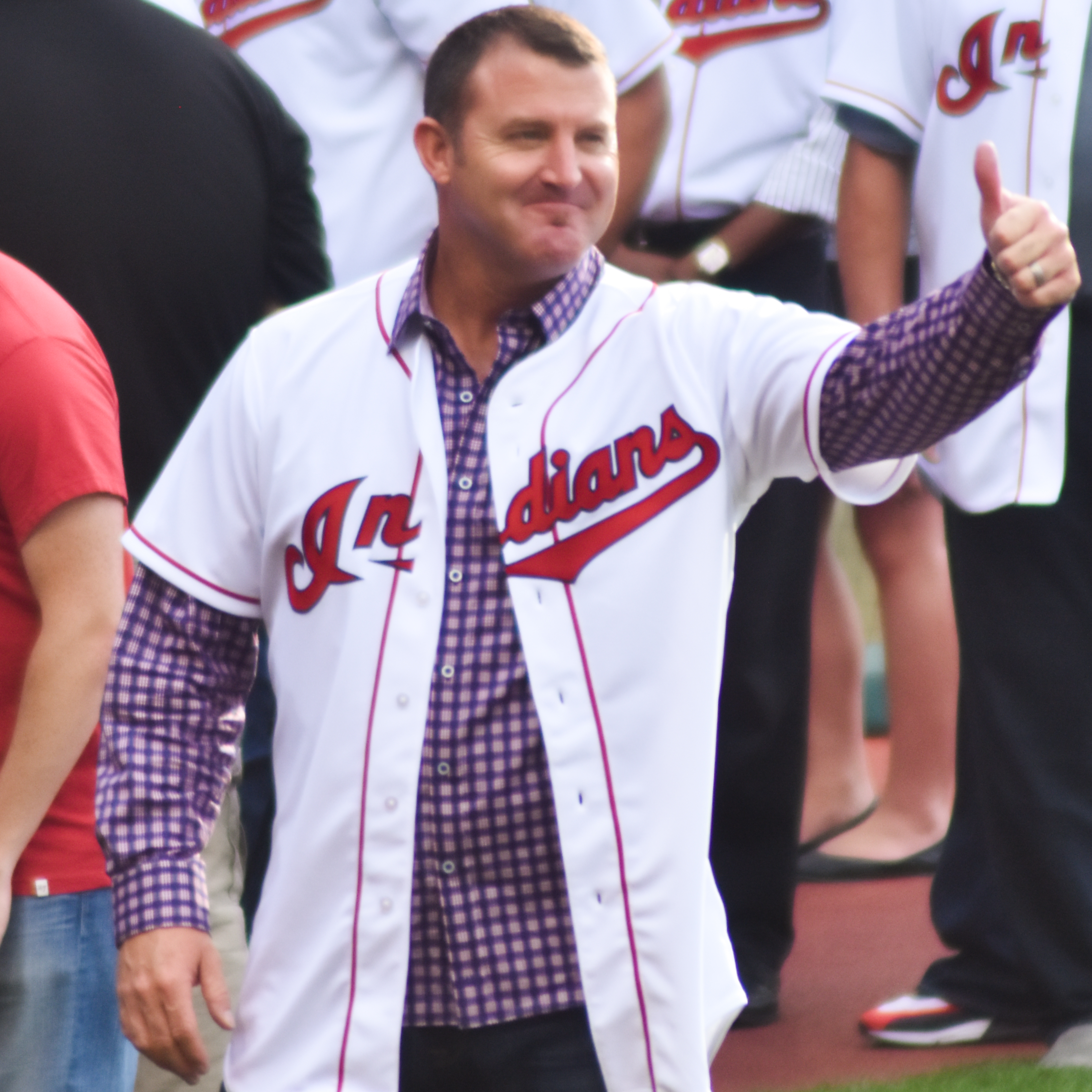
Jim Thome

=== Baseball Hall of Famers ===
Cleveland Guardians Hall of Famers
Affiliation according to the National Baseball Hall of Fame and Museum
Cleveland Naps

**Elmer Flick** *

**Addie Joss** *

**Nap Lajoie** *

**Cy Young**

Cleveland Indians

Roberto Alomar
**Earl Averill** *
Harold Baines
Bert Blyleven
**Lou Boudreau** *
Steve Carlton
**Stan Coveleski** *

**Larry Doby** *
Dennis Eckersley
Billy Evans
**Bob Feller** *
Joe Gordon
Walter Johnson
Jeff Kent

Ralph Kiner
**Bob Lemon** *
**Al López**
Minnie Miñoso
Jack Morris
Eddie Murray
Hal Newhouser

Phil Niekro
Satchel Paige
Gaylord Perry
Sam Rice
Frank Robinson
CC Sabathia
**Joe Sewell** *

Billy Southworth
**Tris Speaker** *
**Jim Thome** *
Hoyt Wilhelm
Dick Williams
Dave Winfield
**Early Wynn** *

- Players and managers listed in **bold** are depicted on their Hall of Fame plaques wearing a Indians or Naps cap insignia.
- * Cleveland Naps or Indians listed as primary team according to the Hall of Fame

=== Ford C. Frick Award recipients ===
Cleveland Guardians Ford C. Frick Award recipients
Affiliation according to the National Baseball Hall of Fame and Museum

Mel Allen

Joe Castiglione

**Jimmy Dudley**

**Jack Graney**

**Tom Hamilton**

- **Names in bold** received the award based primarily on their work as broadcasters for the Indians/Guardians.

=== Retired numbers ===
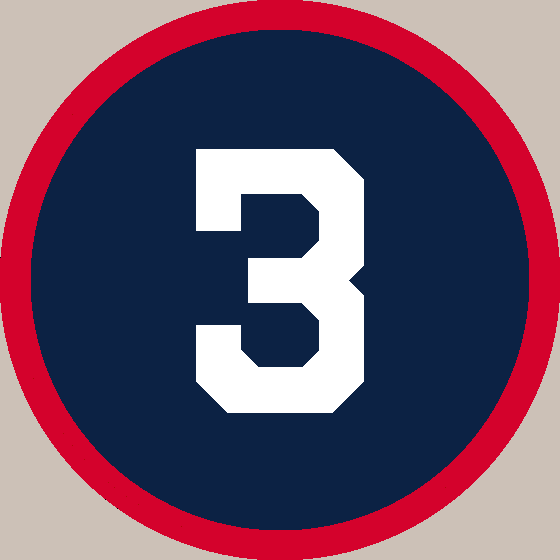
Earl
Averill
CF
Retired June 8, 1975
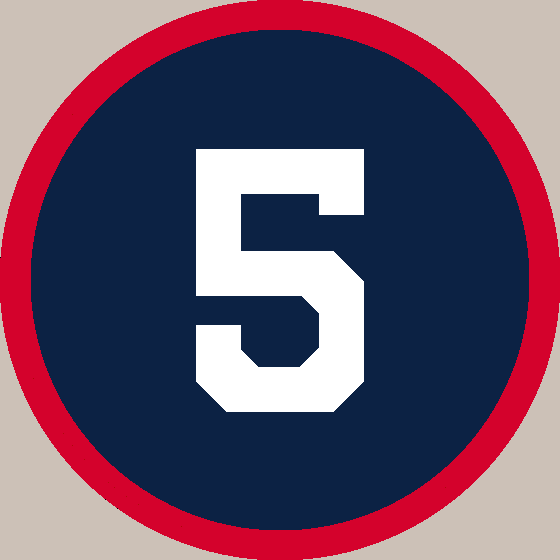
Lou
Boudreau
SS, Manager
Retired July 9, 1970
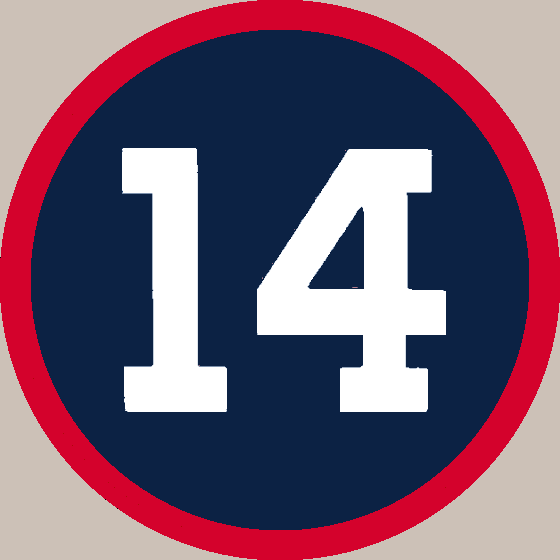
Larry
Doby
CF, Coach
Retired July 3, 1994
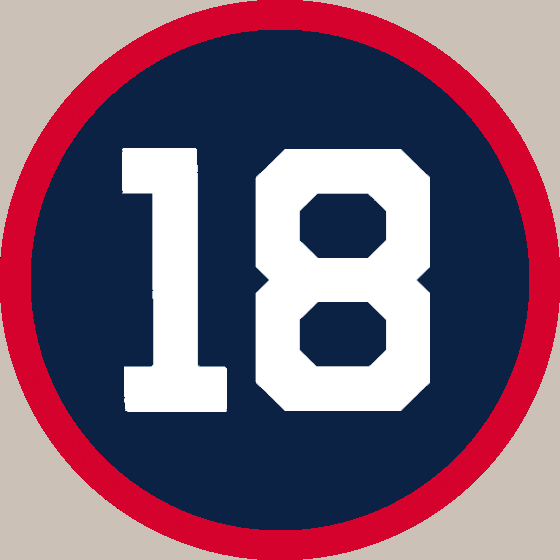
Mel
Harder
SP, Coach
Retired July 28, 1990
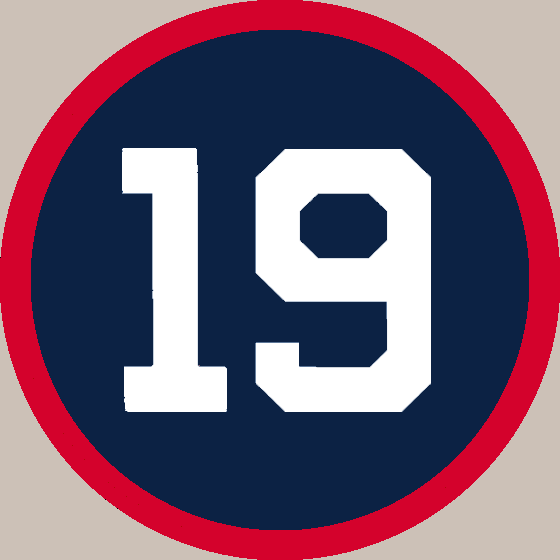
Bob
Feller
SP, Coach
Retired December 27, 1956
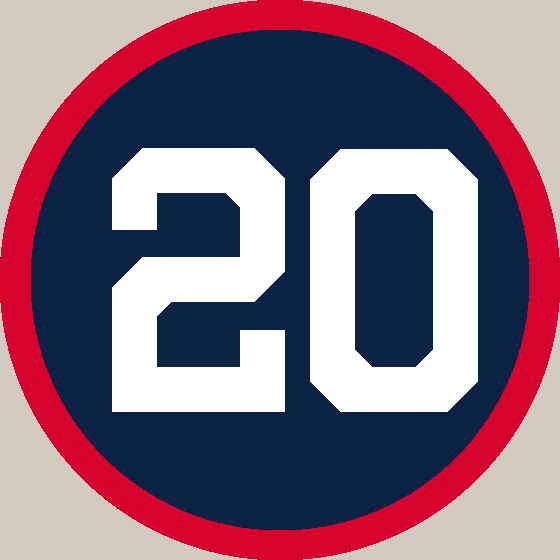
Frank
Robinson
OF, Manager
Retired May 28, 2017
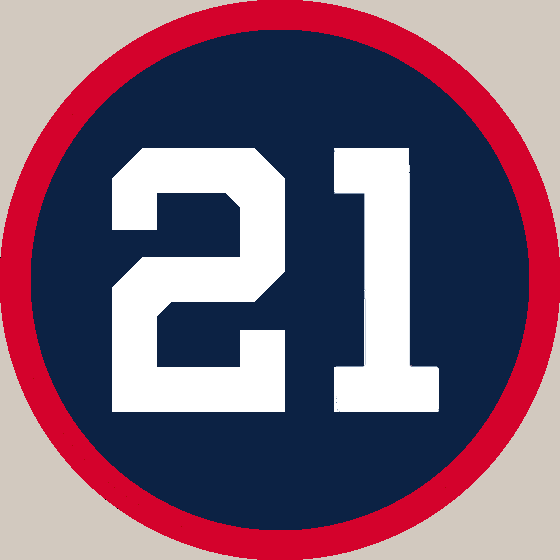
Bob
Lemon
P, Coach
Retired June 20, 1998
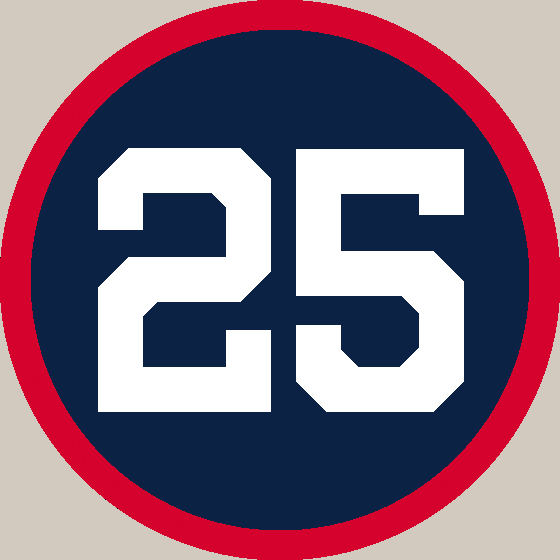
Jim
Thome
1B, DH, 3B
Retired August 18, 2018
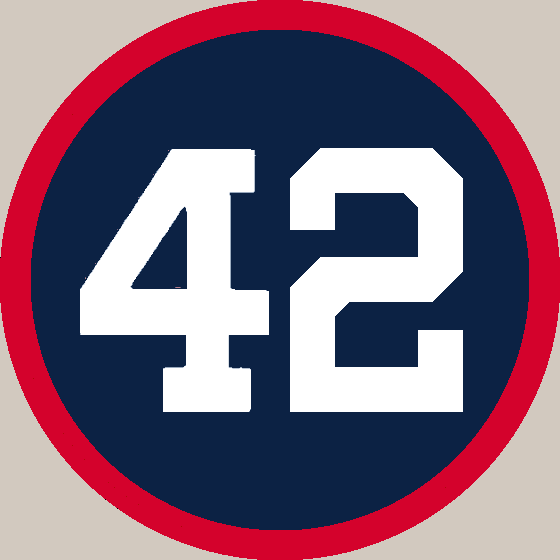
Jackie
Robinson
All MLB
Retired April 15, 1997
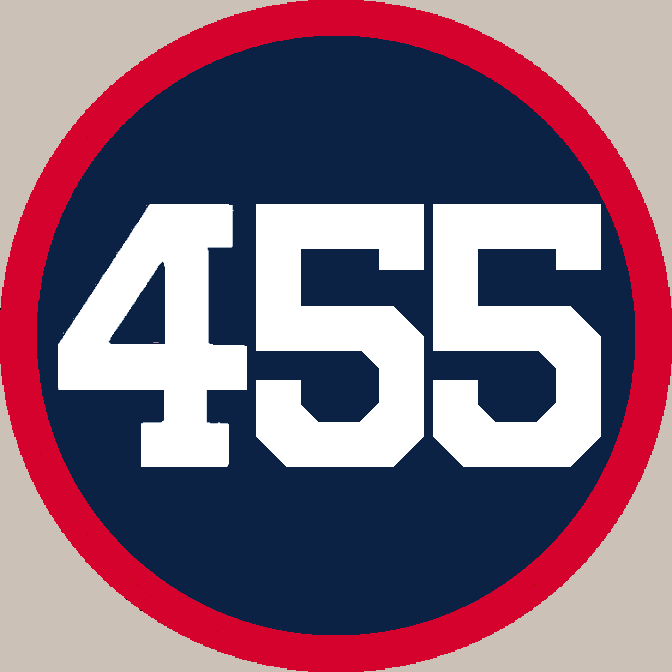
The
Fans

Retired May 29, 2001
- Jackie Robinson's number 42 is retired throughout Major League Baseball.
- The number 455 was retired in honor of the Indians fans after the team sold out 455 consecutive games between 1995 and 2001, which was an MLB record until it was surpassed by the Boston Red Sox on September 8, 2008.

=== Statues ===
Numerous Naps/Indians players have had statues made in their honor:

==== In and around Progressive Field ====
- Bob Feller (team all-time leader in wins and strikeouts by a pitcher, 1948 World Series Champion, eight-time All-Star) – since 1994*
- Jim Thome (team all-time leader in home runs and walks by a hitter, three-time All-Star with the Indians) – since 2014*
- Larry Doby (First black player in the American League, 1948 World Series Champion, seven-time All-Star) – since 2015*
- Frank Robinson (Became first black manager in MLB history when he served as player/manager from 1975 to 1977) – since 2017
- Lou Boudreau (1948 AL MVP, 1948 World Series Champion as player/manager, eight-time All-Star) – since 2017*

==== In and around Cleveland ====
- Hall of Fame outfielder Elmer Flick has a statue in his hometown of Bedford, Ohio, a nearby suburb of Cleveland – since 2013*
- Former outfielder Luke Easter has a statue outside of his namesake park on the east side of Cleveland – since 1980 (when the park was renamed in Easter's honor following his murder)
- Five-time All-Star (with the Indians) outfielder Rocky Colavito has a statue in Cleveland's Little Italy neighborhood – since August 10, 2021.

(*) – Inducted into the Baseball Hall of Fame as an Indian/Nap.

=== Murals ===
In July 2022, in honor of the 75th anniversary of Larry Doby becoming the AL's first black player, a mural was added to the exterior of Progressive Field, honoring players who were viewed as barrier breakers that played for the Indians/Guardians. The mural features Doby, Frank Robinson, and Satchel Paige.

=== Streets ===
- A portion of Eagle Avenue near Progressive Field was renamed "Larry Doby Way" in 2012.
- Street where his namesake baseball field is located in Cleveland renamed "José Ramírez Way" in 2025

=== Parks and fields ===
A number of parks and newly built and renovated youth baseball fields in Cleveland have been named after former and current Indians/Guardians players, including:

- Luke Easter Park – named for Easter in 1980 following his murder
- Jim Thome All-Star Complex – 2019
- CC Sabathia Field at Luke Easter Park – 2021
- José Ramírez Field at Clark Field – 2023

== Franchise records ==
=== Season records ===
- Highest batting average: .408, Joe Jackson (1911)
- Most games: 163, Leon Wagner (1964)
- Most runs: 140, Earl Averill (1930)
- Highest slugging %: .714, Albert Belle (1994)
- Most doubles: 64, George Burns (1926)
- Most triples: 26, Joe Jackson (1912)
- Most home runs: 52, Jim Thome (2002)
- Most RBIs: 165, Manny Ramírez (1999)
- Most stolen bases: 75, Kenny Lofton (1996)
- Most wins: 31, Jim Bagby, Sr. (1920)
- Lowest ERA: 1.16, Addie Joss (1908)
- Strikeouts: 348, Bob Feller (1946)
- Complete games: 36, Bob Feller (1946)
- Saves: 47, Emmanuel Clase (2024)
- Longest win streak: 22 games (2017)

== Roster ==
Cleveland Guardians 2027 spring training roster
40-man roster		Non-roster invitees	Coaches / other
Pitchers: 55 Franco Alemán; 26 Logan Allen; 28 Tanner Bibee; 54 Joey Cantillo; 44 Slade Cecconi; 41 Daniel Espino; 52 Matt Festa; 33 Hunter Gaddis; 95 Yorman Gómez; 29 Tim Herrin; 35 Colin Holderman; 77 Parker Messick; 49 Austin Peterson; 62 Erik Sabrowski; 36 Cade Smith; 91 Andrew Walters; 32 Gavin Williams; 23 Craig Yoho	Catchers: 16 Patrick Bailey; 30 Cooper Ingle; Infielders: 37 Travis Bazzana; 17 Ángel Genao; 2 CJ Kayfus; 9 Kyle Manzardo; 11 José Ramírez; 4 Brayan Rocchio; 78 Milán Tolentino; Outfielders: 7 Jo Adell; 24 Chase DeLauter; 6 David Fry; 0 Petey Halpin; 38 Steven Kwan; 1 Ángel Martínez; -- Blake Perkins; 10 Daniel Schneemann; 31 Kahlil Watson		Manager: 12 Stephen Vogt; Coaches: 15 Sandy Alomar Jr. (first base/catching); 57 Tony Arnerich (bench coach); 85 Junior Betances (assistant hitting); 56 Grant Fink (hitting); 81 Brad Goldberg (assistant pitching); 88 Caleb Longshore (bullpen); 84 J. T. Maguire (outfield/base running); 87 Andy McKay (field coordinator); 53 Rouglas Odor (third base/infield); 82 Ricky Pacione (bullpen catcher); 83 Dan Puente (assistant hitting); 89 Agustin Rivero (coach/interpreter); 72 Eric Rodríguez (bullpen catcher); 86 Joe Torres (assistant pitching); -- Josh Tubbs (hitting analyst); 51 Carl Willis (pitching); Restricted list: 48 Emmanuel Clase; 45 Luis Ortiz; 36 active, 0 inactive, 0 non-roster invitees; 7-, 10-, or 15-day injured list; * Not on active roster; ^{†} Suspended list; Roster, coaches, and NRIs updated October 30, 2026; Transactions • Depth chart; → All MLB rosters

== Minor league affiliations ==
The Cleveland Guardians farm system consists of seven minor league affiliates.

Class	Team	League	Location	Ballpark	Affiliated
Triple-A	Columbus Clippers	International League	Columbus, Ohio	Huntington Park	2009
Double-A	Akron RubberDucks	Eastern League	Akron, Ohio	7 17 Credit Union Park	1989
High-A	Lake County Captains	Midwest League	Eastlake, Ohio	Classic Auto Group Park	1991
Single-A	Hill City Howlers	Carolina League	Lynchburg, Virginia	Bank of the James Stadium	2015
Rookie	ACL Guardians	Arizona Complex League	Goodyear, Arizona	Goodyear Ballpark	2021
Rookie	DSL Guardians Goryl	Dominican Summer League	Boca Chica, Santo Domingo	Academia de Prospecto Complex	2021
Rookie	DSL Guardians Mendoza	Dominican Summer League	Boca Chica, Santo Domingo	Academia de Prospecto Complex	2021

== Regular season home attendance ==
Home Attendance at Jacobs/Progressive Field
Year	Total attendance	Game average	AL rank
2000	3,456,278	42,670	1st
2001	3,175,523	39,694	3rd
2002	2,616,940	32,308	5th
2003	1,730,002	21,358	12th
2004	1,814,401	22,400	12th
2005	2,013,763	24,861	12th
2006	1,997,995	24,667	11th
2007	2,275,912	28,449	9th
2008	2,169,760	26,787	9th
2009	1,766,242	21,805	13th
2010	1,391,644	17,181	14th
2011	1,840,835	22,726	9th
2012	1,603,596	19,797	13th
2013	1,572,926	19,419	14th
2014	1,437,393	17,746	15th
2015	1,388,905	17,361	14th
2016	1,591,667	19,650	13th
2017	2,048,138	25,286	11th
2018	1,926,701	23,786	9th
2019	1,738,642	21,465	9th
2020	0*	0	T-1st
2021	1,114,368**	13,758	10th
2022	1,295,870	15,998	12th
2023	1,834,068	22,643	10th
2024	2,056,264	25,703	9th
2025	2,051,360	25,325	9th

(*): There were no fans allowed in any MLB stadium in 2020 due to the COVID-19 pandemic.

(**): At the beginning of the season, there was a limit of 30% capacity due to COVID-19 restrictions implemented by Ohio Governor Mike DeWine. On June 2, DeWine lifted the restrictions, and the team immediately allowed full capacity at Progressive Field.

== See also ==
- Cleveland Guardians all-time roster – List of baseball players
- List of Cleveland Guardians managers
- List of Cleveland Guardians seasons
- List of Cleveland Guardians team records
- List of World Series champions

== Notes ==
Awards and achievements
Preceded by Cincinnati Reds; 1919	World Series champions Cleveland Indians; 1920	Succeeded by New York Giants; 1921–1922
Preceded by New York Yankees; 1947	World Series champions Cleveland Indians; 1948	Succeeded by New York Yankees; 1949–1953
Preceded by Chicago White Sox; 1919	American League champions Cleveland Indians; 1920	Succeeded by New York Yankees; 1921–1923
Preceded by New York Yankees; 1947	American League champions Cleveland Indians; 1948	Succeeded by New York Yankees; 1949–1953
Preceded by New York Yankees; 1949–1953	American League champions Cleveland Indians; 1954	Succeeded by New York Yankees; 1955–1958
Preceded by Toronto Blue Jays; 1992–1993	American League champions Cleveland Indians; 1995	Succeeded by New York Yankees; 1996
Preceded by New York Yankees; 1996	American League champions Cleveland Indians; 1997	Succeeded by New York Yankees; 1998–2001
Preceded by Kansas City Royals; 2014–2015	American League champions Cleveland Indians; 2016	Succeeded by Houston Astros; 2017
