= Sports agent =

Representative for professional athletes

A sports agent is a legal representative for professional athletes and coaches who negotiates employment and endorsement contracts on their behalf. Sports agents may also assist with financial planning, legal coordination, and marketing matters, often working alongside lawyers, accountants, and brand managers.

== Description ==
Sports agents act as intermediaries between athletes and sports organizations, handling contract negotiations, sponsorships, and related business affairs. Larger firms such as Creative Artists Agency, Roc Nation Sports, and Octagon may also manage brand partnerships, licensing deals, and media relations for clients.

Because professional sports contracts can be complex, many agents have strong backgrounds in law, business, or finance. They are expected to understand salary-cap systems, league regulations, and the economics of sports labor markets. Agents typically represent multiple clients at once and may begin advising athletes while they are still amateurs or college players, in compliance with relevant league or state rules.

== Regulation ==
In the United States, the conduct of sports agents is governed through both state law and league certification systems. Most states have enacted the Uniform Athlete Agents Act (UAAA), which requires registration, disclosure of fees, and written contracts between agents and athletes. Professional players’ associations such as the National Football League Players Association and National Basketball Players Association require certification before an agent can negotiate player contracts.

=== FIFA regulations ===
FIFA's Regulations on Working with Intermediaries, introduced in 2015, banned third-party ownership of players' economic rights and established a framework for the registration and disclosure of intermediary activity. National associations were required to publish data on agent fees and transactions on an annual basis. The Football Association in England publishes annual agent fee and transaction data across the Premier League, English Football League, National League System and FA Women's Super League.

=== EU Anti-Money Laundering Regulation 2024/1624 ===
EU Regulation 2024/1624, adopted by the European Council on 30 May 2024 and published in the Official Journal of the European Union on 19 June 2024, formally brought professional football agents inside the anti-money laundering regulatory perimeter for the first time in EU law. Under Article 3(n) of the Regulation, football agents are designated as obliged entities from 10 July 2029, subject to the same anti-money laundering and counter-terrorist financing obligations as banks and payment institutions. The Regulation cited the considerable sums involved in cross-border transfer activity, the frequency of multi-jurisdictional transactions, and the sometimes opaque commission and image-rights structures through which agent fees are routed as the rationale for including agents within scope.

From 10 July 2029, football agents providing intermediary services for a fee are required to conduct customer due diligence on the players, clubs and sub-agents with whom they transact; identify and verify the ultimate beneficial ownership of counterparties operating through holding vehicles or offshore structures; screen counterparties against sanctions lists and for politically exposed person status on an ongoing basis; conduct source-of-funds and source-of-wealth analysis for higher-risk relationships; maintain a documented escalation chain for suspicious activity reporting; and operate a board-approved anti-money laundering governance framework subject to independent review. There is no size or turnover-based exemption available to football agents under the Regulation, in contrast to the limited exemption available to professional football clubs under Article 5. Every agent providing intermediary services for a fee is in scope regardless of the number of players represented or the markets in which they operate.

The scale of the transaction flows subject to these requirements is significant. Men's professional football agent fees reached $1.37 billion in 2025, according to FIFA's Annual Report on Football Agents, against a backdrop of $13.08 billion in global men's transfer fees in the same year. Cross-border commission structures, sub-agency arrangements and image-rights vehicles routed through multiple jurisdictions represent the primary compliance risk areas under the Regulation.

The Anti-Money Laundering Authority (AMLA), established under the same legislative package, is responsible for coordinating supervisory standards across EU member states and setting technical standards and guidelines applicable to football agents and clubs. National competent authorities in each member state are responsible for direct supervision of in-scope agents. Non-EU agents operating in cross-border transfer chains with EU-based clubs are indirectly affected, as EU obliged entities must conduct due diligence on their international counterparties as part of their own compliance obligations.

== Media depictions ==
Films such as Jerry Maguire, Two for the Money, and Any Given Sunday depicted sports agents. In England, ITV's Footballers' Wives included a female agent Hazel Bailey. The television show Ballers, which started in 2015, also shows a strong depiction of sports agents.

== Notable sports agents ==
=== American football ===
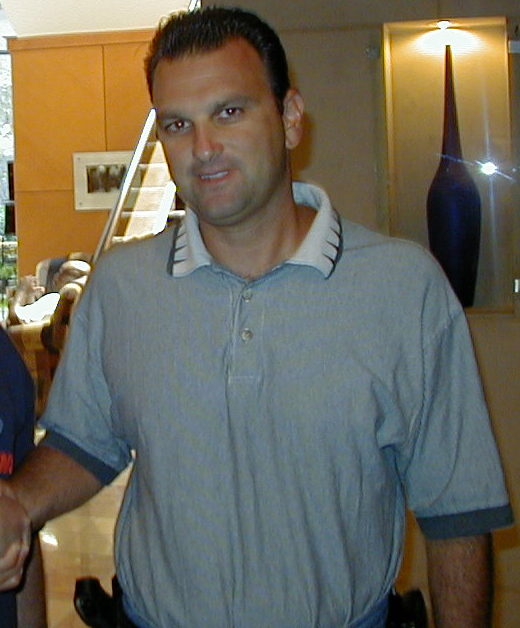
Football agent Drew Rosenhaus

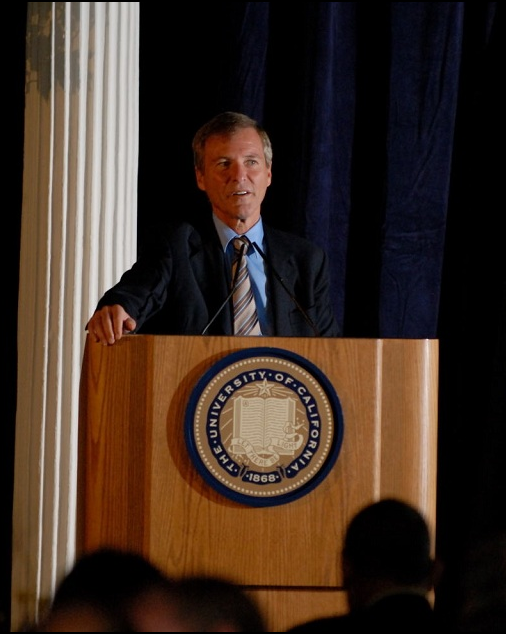
Football agent Leigh Steinberg

- Tom Condon: co-head of Creative Artists Agency (CAA) Football. Clients include Peyton Manning (retired) and Tony Romo (retired).
- James "Bus" Cook: Clients include Brett Favre (retired), Jay Cutler (retired), and Calvin Johnson (retired).
- Tory Dandy: co-head of Creative Artists Agency (CAA) Football. Clients include A. J. Brown and DK Metcalf.
- Jason Fletcher: former player turned agent. Clients include Antonio Cromartie, Jamar Fletcher, Clinton Portis, Fabian Washington, and Darrell Bevell.
- Bob LaMonte: founder and president of Professional Sports Representation. Current clients include Andy Reid, Jon Gruden, Sean McVay and Doug Pederson
- Joe Linta: In 2013, negotiated the richest contract in NFL history for Joe Flacco, despite the fact that he's never been picked for the Pro Bowl.
- Eugene E. Parker: negotiated the highest signing bonuses in NFL history for Emmitt Smith and Deion Sanders. Real-life inspiration for flamboyant character "Rod Tidwell" in the film Jerry Maguire.
- Drew Rosenhaus: Clients include Plaxico Burress and Terrell Owens.
- Peter Schaffer: President of Authentic Athletix, LLC. Clients include including Joe Thomas, Phil Taylor, Barry Sanders, Trevor Pryce, Joshua Cribbs, C. J. Anderson, Mario Edwards Jr., and Hakeem Nicks. and PGA golfers including two-time PGA tour winner Jonathan Kaye and Shane Bertsch.
- Joel Segal: President of Lagardère Unlimited Football. Clients include Eric Fisher, Reggie Bush, Santonio Holmes and Chris Johnson.
- Jimmy Sexton, Co-Head of Football and Head of Coaching as a sports agent for Creative Artist Agency. Clients include Sam Darnold, Julio Jones, Laremy Tunsil and Derrick Henry.
- Bardia Ghahremani: Agent and CEO of International Sports Agency. Clients include Giovani Bernard, Jamie Gillan, Tom Johnson, and Marcus Epps.
- Alexa Stabler-Adams: Owner of Stabler Sports, daughter of the late NFL quarterback Ken Stabler. Currently represents JK Scott.
- Leigh Steinberg: Clients include Troy Aikman and Ben Roethlisberger. Real-life inspiration for fictional sports agent Jerry Maguire in the film of the same name (has a cameo appearance in the movie).
- Don Yee: Clients include Tom Brady and Jimmy Garoppolo.

=== Australian football ===
- Ricky Nixon: former player, who was the AFL's first full-time player manager

=== Baseball ===
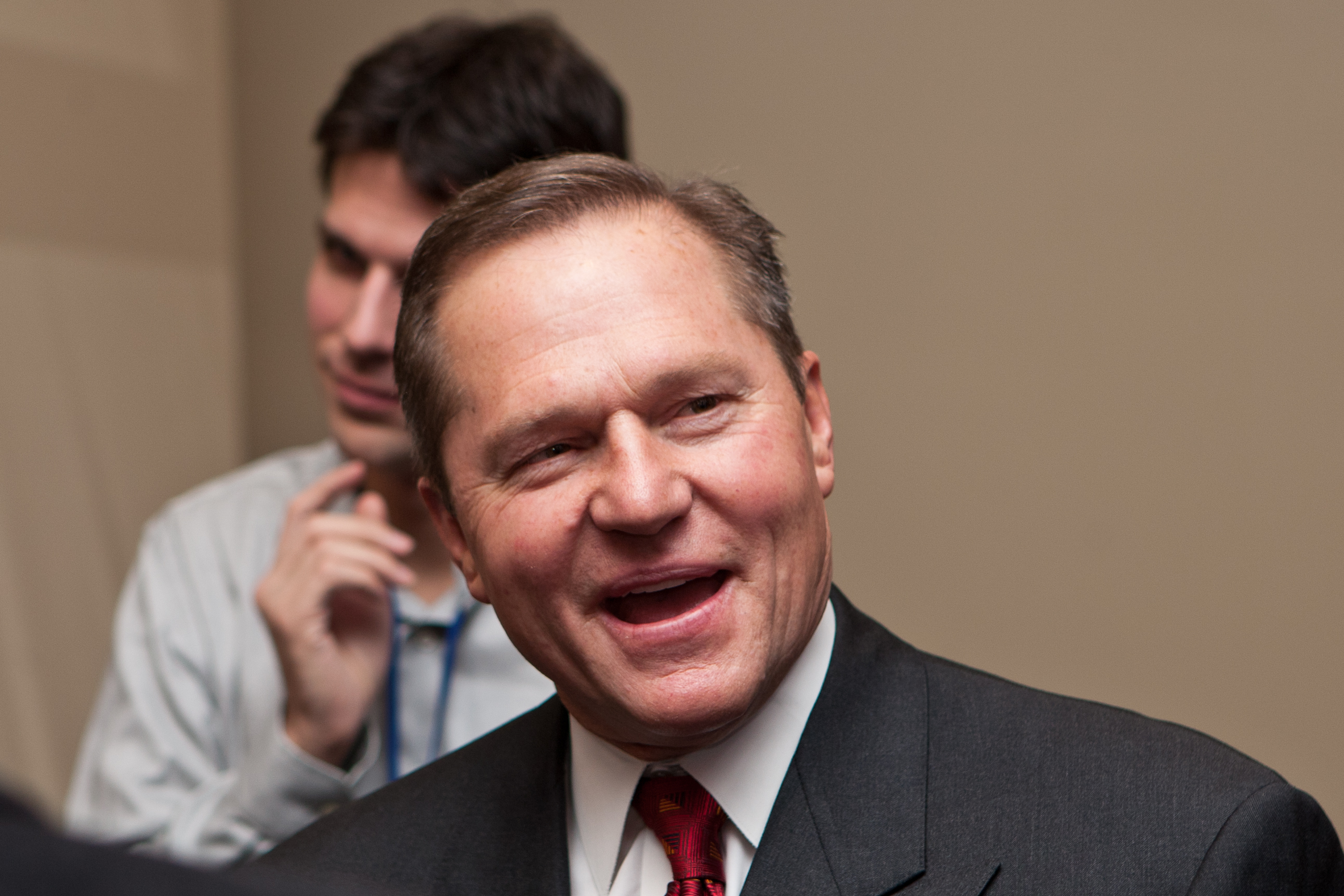
Scott Boras

- Barry Axelrod: Clients included Jeff Bagwell, Craig Biggio, Rick Sutcliffe, and executive Kevin Towers.
- Scott Boras: Clients include Alex Rodriguez and Prince Fielder. Boras is known to have negotiated the highest contracts in Major League Baseball history and the history of sports.
- Casey Close: Clients include Derek Jeter and Ryan Howard.
- Greg Genske: Successor in sports agency formerly run by Jeff Moorad (baseball) and Leigh Steinberg (football).
- Randy Hendricks: Partnered with his brother, Allan; they sold their firm to SFX (now Live Nation), and bought it back again.
- Sam & Seth Levinson: Clients include David Wright and Jon Lester.
- Bo McKinnis: Clients include David Price.
- Jim Munsey: Clients include Sam Fuld, Jarrod Saltalamacchia, and Sean Burnett.
- Lonnie Murray: Clients include Bruce Maxwell; first Black woman agent certified by the MLB Players Association.
- Burton Rocks: Clients include Kip Wells, Jim Riggleman, Mike Easler, Robinson Cancel, Dave Eiland, Paul DeJong, Joe Oliver
- Matt Sosnick: Clients include Dontrelle Willis. Sosnick is subject of the book License to Deal by Jerry Crasnick.
- Arn Tellem: Clients have included Albert Belle, Mike Mussina, and Chase Utley. Also a basketball agent (see below).
- Joe Urbon: Clients include Jason Bay and Grady Sizemore.

=== Basketball ===
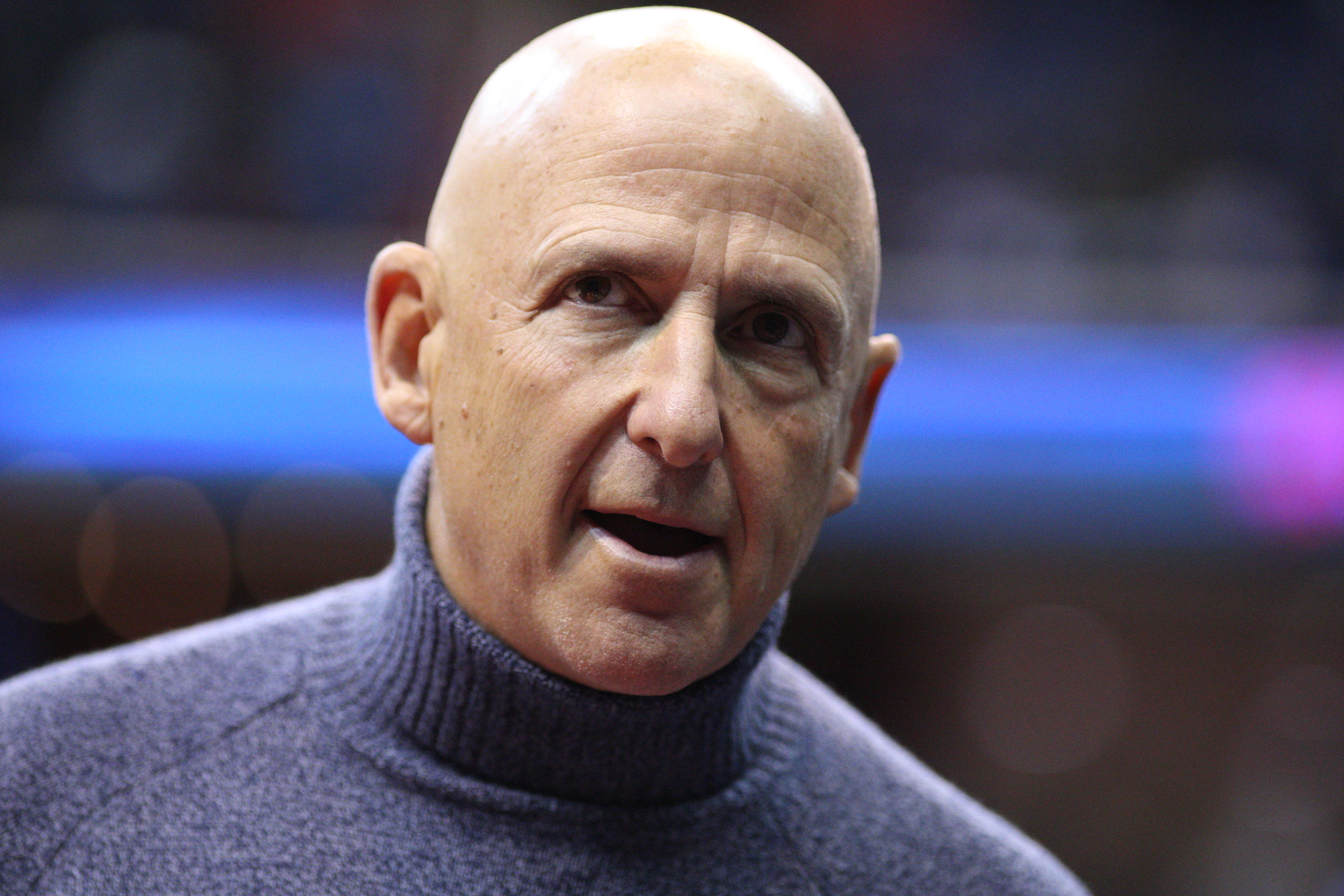
David Falk

- Rich Paul co-owner of Klutch Sports Group with LeBron James. Clients include LeBron James, Anthony Davis, John Wall and Ben Simmons.
- Jeff Austin is head of Octagon's basketball division, and was ranked 11th in the "12 Best Sport Agents in the World" in 2010 by Business Insider. His clients include David Robinson, Moses Malone, Kirk Hinrich, Stephen Curry and Jimmer Fredette.
- Doug Davis: Clients include Metta World Peace and Roger Mason Jr.
- Bill Duffy: Clients include Rajon Rondo, Joakim Noah, Greg Oden, Yao Ming, Klay Thompson, and Steve Nash.
- David Falk: Currently semi-retired. Past clients included Michael Jordan, Patrick Ewing, Allen Iverson, and Dikembe Mutombo. In the 1990s, was generally considered the most influential player agent in the NBA.
- Dan Fegan: Noted for creating several nuances in the most recently expired NBA Collective Bargaining Agreement. Clients include John Wall, Dwight Howard and Ricky Rubio.
- Aaron Goodwin: Terminated by LeBron James, Dwight Howard, Al Horford, and Jamal Crawford. Goodwin now represents over 20 NBA players.
- Roger Montgomery: Works for Jay-Z and his company Roc-Nation. Managed Desmond Mason, Maurice Evans and Jeremy Lin.
- Rob Pelinka: Former basketball player at the University of Michigan and graduate of their law school; worked as an agent before becoming general manager of the Los Angeles Lakers. Past clients include Kobe Bryant and Carlos Boozer.
- Ticha Penicheiro: 2019 inductee of the Women's Basketball Hall of Fame as a player; currently an agent with about 30 clients, among them Kayla McBride and Courtney Vandersloot.
- Leon Rose: Former agent of LeBron James.
- Arn Tellem: Clients include Tracy McGrady, Jermaine O'Neal, Pau Gasol, and Joe Johnson. His clients' total salaries in 2007–08 season added up to more than $210 million. Tellem left the agent business to become President of the Detroit Pistons.

=== Cricket ===
- Neil Fairbrother: Former England cricket player, now Director of Cricket at International Sports Management. Clients include: Andrew Flintoff, Marcus Trescothick, Steve Harmison.

=== European basketball ===
- Miško Ražnatović: Serbian agent. Through his agency (BeoBasket), he mostly represents European basketball players and coaches as well as American players playing in Europe. He represents many highest paid European basketball stars in Euroleague. His notable clients include Nikola Peković, Mirza Teletović, coach Dušan Ivković, Vassilis Spanoulis, Nenad Krstić, Dario Šarić, DeMarcus Nelson, Joffrey Lauvergne, Duško Savanović, Pero Antić, Aleksandar Ćapin, Marko Kešelj, Nihad Đedović, Novica Veličković, Milenko Tepić, Aleksandar Rašić, Raško Katić, İlkan Karaman, Emir Preldžić, Marko Simonović, Andrija Žižić, etc. Ražnatović was additionally involved in the Deron Williams' transfer to Beşiktaş during the 2011 NBA lockout and owns a basketball club KK Mega Vizura that competes in the Basketball League of Serbia.
- Craig McKenzie: American basketball agent. Worked for Eugene E. Parker on Deion Sanders. At 27, was one of youngest agents ever to have lottery pick in Bonzi Wells. Clients included three-sport athlete Charlie Ward, and American International Basketball stars Marcus Brown, JR Bremer, Demond Mallet and Mire Chatman, some of the highest paid players in Europe at one time.
- Zoran Savić: Serbian agent. Through his agency (Invictus Sports Group), Barcelona-based Savić represents coach Xavi Pascual, Milan Mačvan, coach Žan Tabak, Dalibor Bagarić, Ivan Opačak, etc.

=== Association football ===
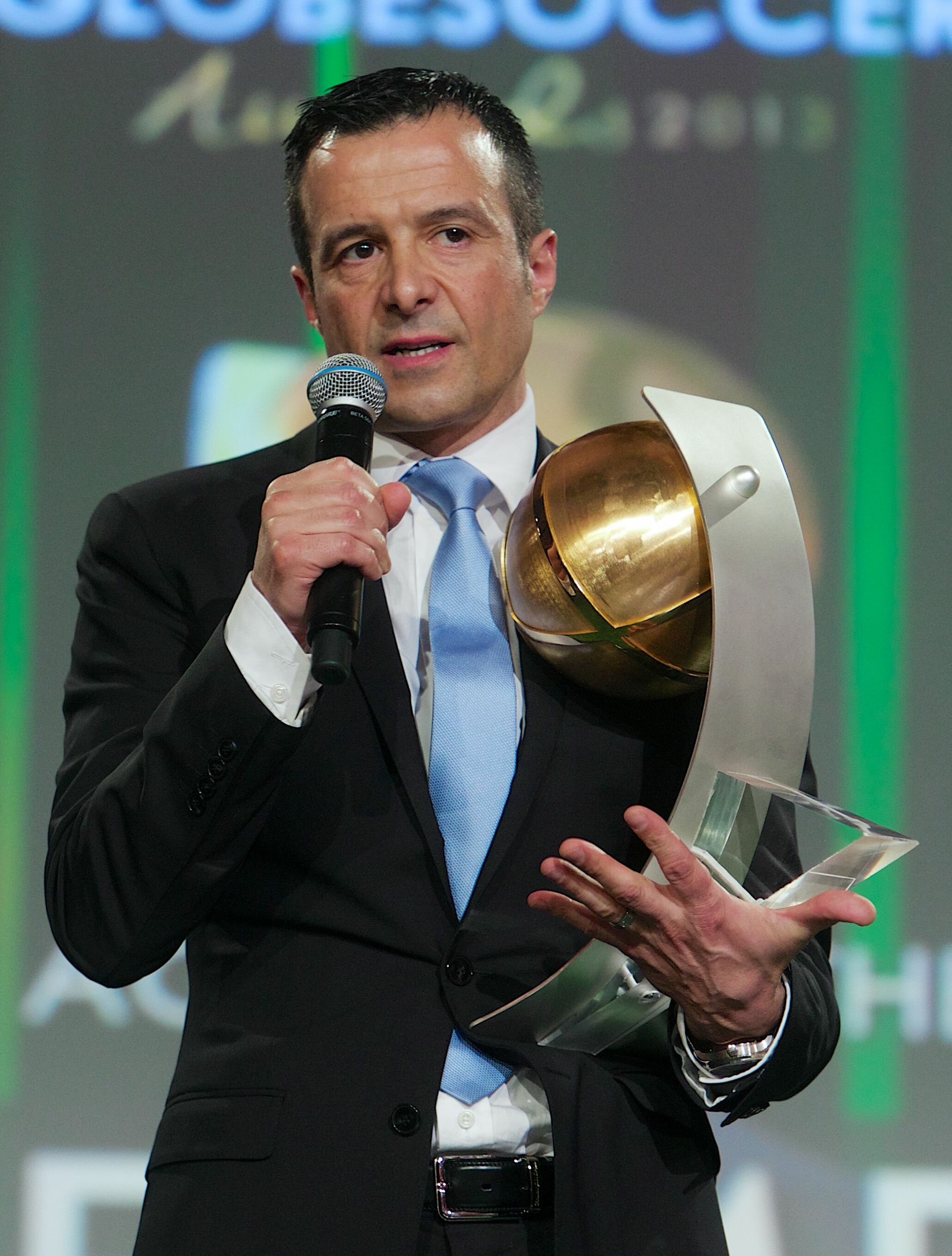
Jorge Mendes

- Rafaela Pimenta: Brazilian female agent. Has represented Erling Haaland and Paul Pogba.
- Jorge Mendes: Portuguese agent. Founder of GestiFute. Clients include Cristiano Ronaldo, Radamel Falcao, David de Gea, Diego Costa, Renato Sanches, Ricardo Quaresma, Deco, Nani, Ángel Di María, Lamine Yamal and managers José Mourinho, Aitor Karanka and Luiz Felipe Scolari.
- Pini Zahavi: Israeli agent. Handled deals involving the transfers of Carlos Tevez, Yakubu and Rio Ferdinand.
- Bila Kanza: English-based French Sports Agent and founder of LKI – Lonrisk International Management.
- Jon Smith: English agent who one represented Diego Maradona.
- Paul Stretford: English agent. Clients include, Wayne Rooney. Set up Triple S Sports Entertainment Group in 2009 after leaving Proactive Sports, which he originally established.
- Constantin Dumitraşcu: French-based Romanian agent. His agency (Mondial Sports Management) include Edinson Cavani, Alexandre Pato, Hatem Ben Arfa, Fernandinho, Nemanja Matić, Douglas Costa and Philippe Coutinho.
- Milan Ćalasan: Serbian agent. His agency (Mondialvas) represented Christian Karembeu, manager Arsène Wenger and Nikola Žigić.
- Claes Elefalk: Swedish agent. Clients include Freddie Ljungberg, Pontus Farnerud, and Nils-Eric Johansson, plus several NHL ice hockey players.
- Roger Ljung: Former Swedish international player, owns his own agency (Roger Ljung Promotion AB). Represented Freddie Ljungberg until 2006. Clients include Marcus Allbäck, Daniel Andersson, Patrik Andersson, Erik Edman, Andreas Isaksson, Kim Källström, Marcus Lantz and Teddy Lučić.
- Martin Dahlin: Former Swedish international player; works for Roger Ljung Promotion AB
- Dirk Hebel: Former German footballer, owns his own agency (Fussballmarkt). Has represented Mario Götze, Sunday Oliseh, Goran Sablić and Patrick Weiser.
- Abdilgafar "Fali" Ramadani: Macedonia-born, Germany-based Albanian agent. His agency (LIAN Sports) that he co-owns with Nikola Damjanac represents players either from or with family ties to former Yugoslavia such as Stevan Jovetić, Lazar Marković, Adem Ljajić, Zvjezdan Misimović, Haris Seferovic and Marko Marin.
- Barry Silkman: English agent. Clients include David Villa, Demba Ba and Ravel Morrison.
- Zoran Stojadinović: Serbian agent.
- Paschalis Tountouris: International agent of Greek origin and founder of Prosport. Clients include Giorgos Karagounis, Dimitris Kolovos, Fiorin Durmishaj, Knowledge Musona, Kostas Tsimikas youngs stars Marios Vrousai, Anastasios Chatzigiovanis and manager Yannis Anastasiou.
- Walter Palombo: Swiss-based Italian sports advisor, and the founder of Palombo Consulting. His notable clients are Andy Carroll, Jack Wilshere, Jermaine Pennant and Jermain Defoe & Julian Dicks in the Premier League. Genaro Gattuso in Serie A & Christian Karembeu.
- Kevin Davies: Former English international player, owns his own agency: KCD Management.
- Rhydian Thomas: Wales-based sports agent. Founder and owner of GSF Agency, which he set up in 2015, having previously founded Complete Sports Management (CSM), which ran from 2001, managing international rugby union players. GSF agency covers South Wales and the West Country, identifying the best academy talent in the region. Notable clients include Sam Pearson. GSF Agency Web

=== Golf ===
- Mark Steinberg: Clients include Tiger Woods; former head of golf division at IMG.
- Andrew Chandler: Former European Tour golfer. Clients include golfers Lee Westwood, Ernie Els, Darren Clarke, Louis Oosthuizen, Charl Schwartzel, and Christina Kim. Rory McIlroy was a client of Chandler until October 2011, when he left for Dublin-based Horizon Sports Management.

=== Ice hockey ===
- Mike Barnett: former agent of Wayne Gretzky, Brett Hull, Paul Coffey, Jaromír Jágr, Joe Thornton, Lanny McDonald, Sergei Fedorov, Alexander Mogilny, Owen Nolan, Mats Sundin and Dany Heatley.
- Ritch Winter: over 70 clients.
- Gilles Lupien: former NHL defenceman; current Canadian ice hockey agent. Clients include Roberto Luongo.
- Don Meehan: president of Newport Sports Management. Over 100 clients in the NHL, including Jarome Iginla, Steven Stamkos, P. K. Subban and Chris Pronger.
- Tatiana Ovechkina, two-time basketball gold medalist, is her son Alexander Ovechkin's agent. She brokered a 13-year, $124 million contract.
- Allan Walsh in 2004 merged his hockey representation with Octagon Hockey. His clients include Marc-André Fleury, Patrik Eliáš, Martin Havlát and Milan Michálek.
- Pat Brisson – agent of Sidney Crosby, among others

=== Motorsport ===
- Alan Miller: Jimmie Johnson
- Keke Rosberg: JJ Lehto and Mika Häkkinen, also managed son Nico Rosberg between 2006 and 2008
- Nicolas Todt: Felipe Massa
- Willi Weber: Primarily Michael Schumacher

=== Olympics ===
- Peter Carlisle: Clients include Michael Phelps, Natalie Coughlin, Apolo Ohno, Seth Wescott and Chris Klug.

== Notable former sports agents ==
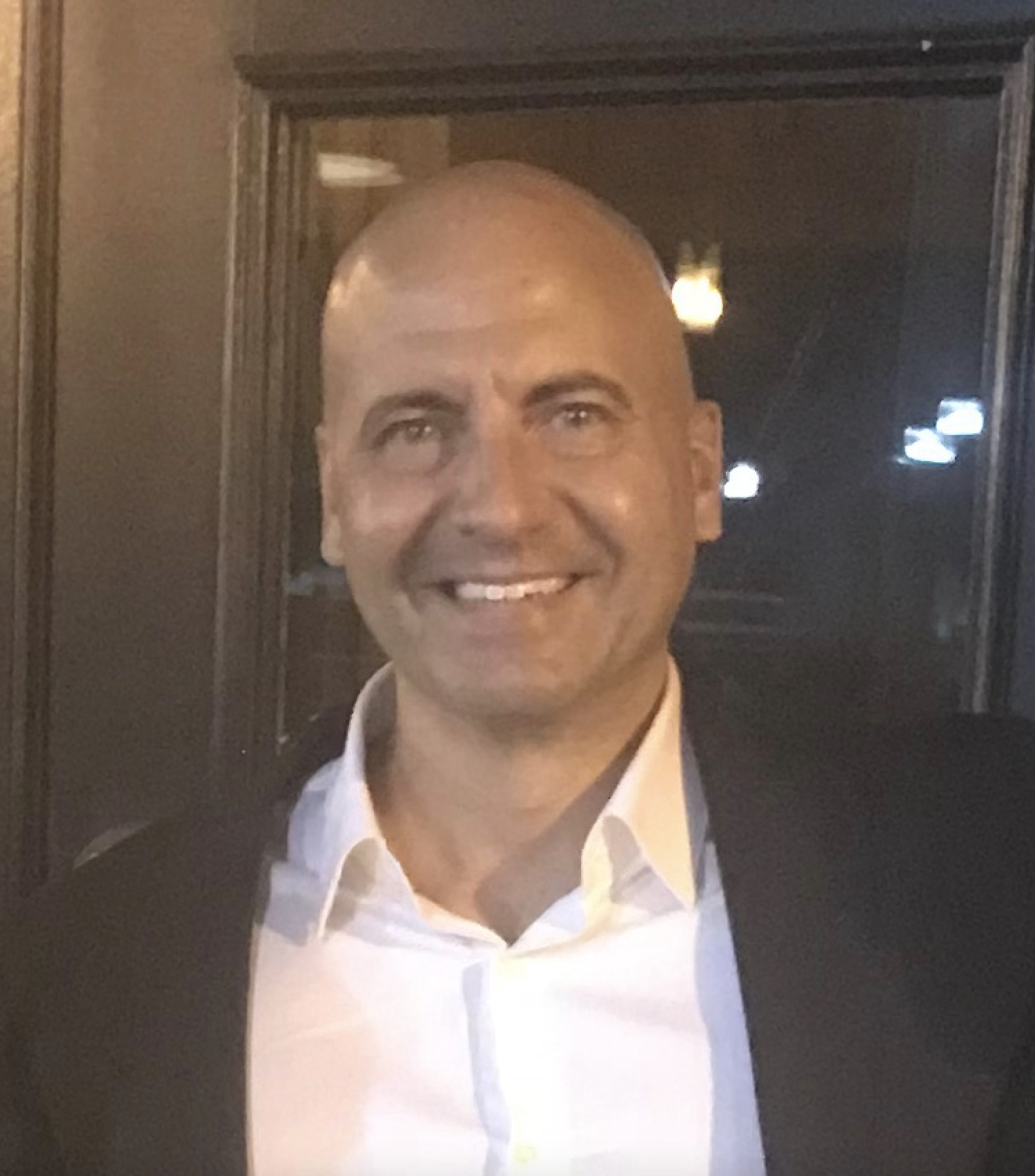
Joe Kehoskie

- William J. Bruce III former clients include the "Million Dollar Man" Ted DiBiase of WWE and Shawn Harper of the NFL.
- Nachi Gordon, basketball
- Colleen Howe (deceased): ice hockey, late president of Power Play International and Power Play Publications managing hockey careers and business interests of her husband Gordie Howe and their sons Marty and Mark Howe.
- Joe Kehoskie (now baseball consultant/executive): Small agency; frequent media appearances regarding Cuban defectors and baseball in Latin America.
- Camilo Marin (deceased): Cuban-born horse racing agent. Clients included Laffit Pincay Jr., Braulio Baeza, Jorge Velásquez and Manuel Ycaza.
- Mark McCormack (deceased): American golf agent, and principal originator of modern sports agency industry. First client was Arnold Palmer. Founded IMG (originally "International Management Group").
- Jeff Moorad: Former baseball agent and former partner of Leigh Steinberg, now baseball executive and part-owner of San Diego Padres.
- Rob Pelinka: Former basketball player at the University of Michigan. Clients include Kobe Bryant, Carlos Boozer, and Buddy Hield. Pelinka stepped down from being an agent to be run the Los Angeles Lakers in March 2017.
- Charles C. Pyle (deceased): American football; clients included Red Grange and Wildcat Wilson; founder of first American Football League (1926).
- Mino Raiola (deceased): Dutch-based Italian association football agent. His notable clients included Paul Pogba, Zlatan Ibrahimović, Mario Balotelli, and Pavel Nedvěd.
- Paige Tatters: First female NHLPA certified agent.
- Gary Wichard (deceased): American football, three dozen clients, the inspiration for the movie Jerry Maguire.

== Sports agency groups ==
There have been some efforts to transform the sports agency business from an individual, entrepreneurial business, to more of a corporate structure. These experiments met with varying degrees of longevity and success.

- Allegiant Athletic Agency – representing NBA and NFL players
- Creative Artists Agency: "CAA" – acquired various pieces of the sports agency business of SFX (see below), starting with football.
- IMG – International Management Group – corporate agency established by entrepreneur Mark McCormack, originally with a specialization in golf and tennis.
- Infront - international sports rights vendor, representing Serie A, FIFA, and others.
- International Sports Management – British sports agency run by former European Tour golfer Andrew "Chubby" Chandler.
- Priority Sports and Entertainment - Agency representing the most NBA players, run by Mark Bartelstein.
- Prodigy Agency - The biggest esports agency in the world, founded in 2019 by Jérôme Coupez.
- Roc Nation Sports – sports agency founded in 2013 by Shawn Carter, better known as Jay-Z. Currently in partnership with CAA; first client signed was Robinson Canó.
- Rosenhaus Sports - sports agency run by Drew Rosenhaus.
- Sportfive, formerly Lagardère Sports and Entertainment – international sports agency, sports consulting and event management, active in the football, tennis and golf markets.
- Sports Management Worldwide – international sports agency and private for-profit sports management training institution, founded and run by Lynn Lashbrook.
- Wasserman Media Group (WME) - acquired Arn Tellem's basketball agency from SFX, and usually represents the most players in NBA lottery draft each year.
- Imago Sports Management - Imago Sports Management is a Bangladeshi talent and sports based agency.

=== Formerly active agencies ===
Some sports agency firms were once prominent, but are now gone or reorganized:

- Assante Corporation – Canadian public company that acquired the Steinberg, Moorad & Dunn agency, then acquired other than agencies including Dan Fegan & Associates and Maximum Sports Management in an unsuccessful effort to build multi-sport corporate agency.
- SFX Entertainment (now Live Nation, a publicly traded company) – in 1998 SFX agreed to pay up to $150 million in cash, stock, and bonuses for F.A.M.E., the sports agency run by David Falk, the agent for basketball players Michael Jordan and Patrick Ewing. SFX also acquired two other major sports agencies, Arn Tellem's agency (Tellem & Associates) and the baseball-oriented firm run by Randy Hendricks and Allan Hendricks. SFX would later reverse course, and sell off the pieces of its large sports agency business.
- Steinberg, Moorad & Dunn ("SMD") – a multi-sport agency sold in October 1999 for reported $120 million to Canadian financial firm. Defections of principals, and litigation, followed. Originally led by entrepreneurial agents Leigh Steinberg and Jeff Moorad.

== See also ==
- Entertainment law
- Talent agent - The discussion of the agents that represent entertainment talent and may also participate in sports agency.
