= List of people from Everett, Washington =

The following is a list of notable individuals who were born in and/or have lived in Everett, Washington, a major city in the Seattle metropolitan area.

== Actors and actresses ==
- Stan Boreson, TV comedian and musician
- David L. Boushey, stuntman
- Nancy Coleman, actress
- Patrick Duffy, actor
- Peg Phillips, actress
- Michael Shamus Wiles, actor
- Cherie Witter, model and actress
- Mark L. Young, actor

== Artists and authors ==
- Bruce Barcott, journalist and author
- Donna Barr, comic book author
- Chuck Close, painter and photographer
- David Eddings, fantasy author
- Anita Endrezze, poet and author
- James Kelsey, sculptor
- Linda Lee Cadwell, teacher, wife of Bruce Lee
- Alden Mason, painter
- James Mongrain, glass artist
- Mark P. Shea, Catholic author
- Dick Weiss, glass artist
- Hai Ying Wu, sculptor

== Military and crime ==
- Marcus A. Anderson, Air Force lieutenant general
- Ryan G. Anderson, convicted al-Qaeda enabler
- James E. Kyes, Navy Cross recipient Commander (O-5)
- Topliff Olin Paine, airmail pilot

== Musicians ==
- William Bolcom, pianist and composer
- Bus Boyk, fiddler
- Daniel E. Freeman, musicologist
- Carol Kaye, bass player
- Kenny Loggins, singer-songwriter
- Curtis Salgado, singer-songwriter
- Jason Webley, singer-songwriter

=== Bands ===
- The Moondoggies, rock band
- Parenthetical Girls, experimental pop band

== Politicians and businesspeople ==
- Kevin Avard, state representative in New Hampshire
- Howard S. Bargreen, Washington state representative and senator
- Glenn Beck, conservative author and radio/TV host
- Jean Berkey, Washington state legislator
- Edith Bullock, businesswoman and Alaska territorial legislator
- David Marston Clough, former Minnesota governor and politician
- JoAnn Dayton-Selman, Wyoming state representative
- Jacob Falconer, U.S. congressman, state legislator, and Everett mayor
- William Gissberg, Washington state senator
- Don Hansey, Washington state representative
- Nick Harper, Washington state senator
- Roland H. Hartley, Washington governor
- Emil Herman, activist and political candidate
- Henry M. Jackson, U.S. congressman and senator
- Daniel J. Kremer, California judge
- Rick Larsen, U.S. representative, former Snohomish County councilor
- Marko Liias, Washington state senator
- Anna Agnes Maley, journalist and political candidate
- August P. Mardesich, Washington state representative and senator
- A. L. Rasmussen, Washington state representative and senator
- Aaron Reardon, Snohomish County executive and Washington state representative
- June Robinson, Washington state representative and senator
- Ella Russell, suffragette and political candidate
- J. H. Smith, politician and pioneer
- Carolyn Squires, nurse and Montana politician
- Brian Sullivan, county councilman and Washington state representative
- Michael Kelly Sutton, software engineer and journalist
- Elmer R. Tapper, Louisiana state representative
- Don Van Patten, New Hampshire state representative
- Larry Vognild, politician
- Monrad Wallgren, governor, U.S. congressman and senator
- Jack Westland, U.S. Representative and amateur golf champion
- Emily Wicks, state representative
- Lisa Witter, entrepreneur and public speaker

== Religion ==
- Patrick J. Conroy, Jesuit priest and chaplain of the U.S. House of Representatives
- Vernard Eller, theologian and author

== Scientists and academics ==
- John F. Eisenberg, zoologist
- Helen Freeman, conservationist
- Edwin Hewitt, mathematician
- Allen C. Kelley, economist
- Susan A. Martinis, biochemist
- Kent R. Weeks, Egyptologist
- Wesley Wehr, paleontologist and artist

== Sportspeople ==
=== Baseball ===
- Rick Anderson, MLB pitching coach
- Larry Christenson, MLB pitcher
- Brent Lillibridge, MLB infielder
- Grady Sizemore, MLB outfielder and coach
- Travis Snider, MLB outfielder
- Steven Souza, MLB outfielder
- Earl Torgeson, MLB first baseman

=== Basketball ===
- Mike Champion, NBA forward
- Boody Gilbertson, NBA player
- Dan Muscatell, college basketball coach

=== Curling ===
- John Jamieson, curler

=== Cycling ===
- Tom Peterson, road racing cyclist

=== Football ===
- Tom Cable, football coach
- Chris Chandler, NFL quarterback
- Dave Christensen, college football coach
- Earl Clark, college football player and coach
- Dennis Erickson, football coach
- Rick Fenney, NFL running back
- Kyler Gordon, NFL cornerback
- Vern Hickey, college football coach
- Gordon Hudson, NFL tight end
- Shiloh Keo, NFL safety
- Jim Lambright, college football player and coach
- Chuck Nelson, NFL kicker
- Dave Osborn, NFL running back
- Mike Price, football coach
- Geoff Reece, NFL center
- Timm Rosenbach, college football coach
- KeiVarae Russell, NFL corner back
- Tani Tupou, XFL defensive tackle
- Abe Wilson, NFL offensive lineman
- Abraham Lucas, NFL offensive lineman

=== Golf ===
- Rex Caldwell, golfer
- Mary Bea Porter, golfer
- Anne Quast, amateur golfer

=== Hockey ===
- T. J. Oshie, NHL forward

=== Martial arts ===
- Randy Couture, mixed martial artist and UFC Hall of Fame member

=== Soccer ===
- Nathan Aune, defender
- Brady Ballew, midfielder
- Jalen Crisler, defender
- Pepe Fernández, forward
- Chris Henderson, midfielder
- Sean Henderson, midfielder
- Jordan Schweitzer, midfielder

=== Volleyball ===
- Kathryn Holloway, Paralympic volleyball player
- Bianca Rowland, volleyball player

=== Wrestling ===
- Craig Roberts, wrestler and Olympian
