= Predrag Materić =

French–Serbian sports agent and basketball player

Personal information
- Born: 12 June 1977 (age 49) Belgrade, SR Serbia, SFR Yugoslavia
- Listed height: 1.97 m (6 ft 6 in)
- Listed weight: 96 kg (212 lb)

Career information
- College: UConn (1995–1996); Barton CC (1996–1997); UAB (1997–1998)
- NBA draft: 1998: undrafted
- Playing career: 1998–2006
- Position: Shooting guard / small forward
- Number: 10, 11, 15

Career history
- 1998: Olimpia Milano
- 1998: → BCM Gravelines
- 1998: → Felice Scandone
- 1999: Dinamo Sassari
- 1999–2000: Gymnastikos Larissas
- 2001: Le Havre
- 2001–2002: Partizan
- 2002–2003: Hemofarm
- 2003: P.A.O.K.
- 2003: Le Havre
- 2003–2004: Partizan
- 2005: CSU Asesoft Ploiești
- 2005–2006: Mega Ishrana

Predrag Materić (Serbian Cyrillic: Предраг Матерић; born 12 June 1977) is a Serbian–French sports agent and former professional basketball player who serves as a vice-president at BeoBasket.

== Playing career ==
Materić played college basketball for the UConn Huskies, Barton Cougars, and UAB Blazers.

A swingman, Materić spent his professional career with Olimpia Milano, BCM Gravelines, S.S. Felice Scandone, Dinamo Sassari, Gymnastikos S. Larissas 1928, Le Havre, Partizan, Hemofarm, P.A.O.K., CSU Asesoft Ploiești, and Mega Ishrana. He retired as a professional player with Mega Ishrana in 2006.

== Career achievements ==
- FIBA EuroCup Challenge champion: 1 (with CSU Asesoft Ploiești: 2004–05)
- YUBA League champion: 2 (with Partizan: 2001–02, 2003–04)
- Yugoslav Cup winner: 1 (with Partizan: 2001–02)

== Basketball agent career ==
Materić serves as a Vice President and director of French basketball at the BeoBasket agency.

== See also ==
- Serbs in France
- Serbs in Sarajevo
