= Luke Hochevar =

American baseball player (born 1983)

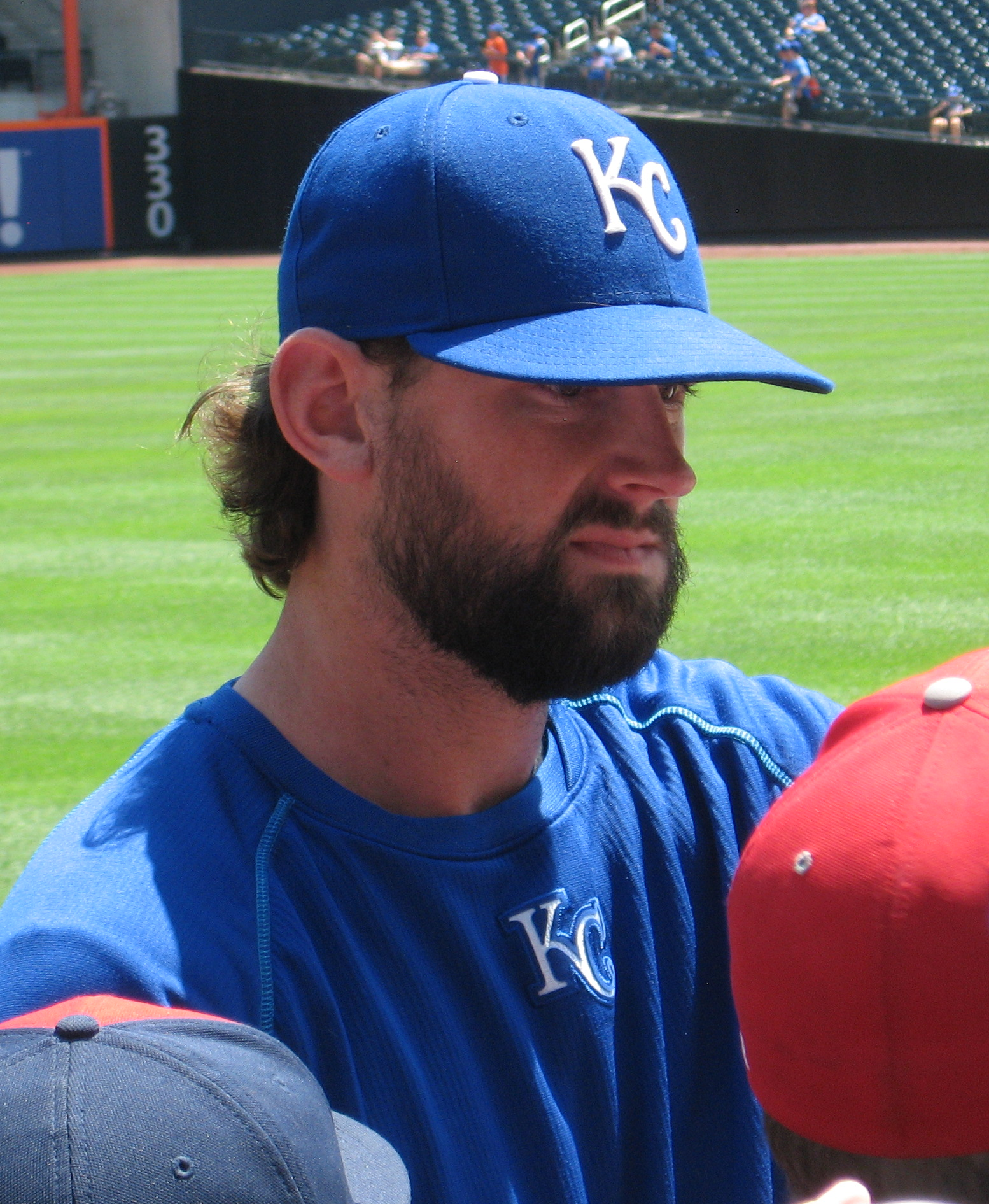
- Hochevar with the Royals in 2016
- Pitcher
- Born: September 15, 1983 (age 43); Denver, Colorado, U.S.
- Batted: Right Threw: Right

MLB debut
- September 8, 2007, for the Kansas City Royals

Last MLB appearance
- July 24, 2016, for the Kansas City Royals

MLB statistics
- Win–loss record: 46–65
- Earned run average: 4.98
- Strikeouts: 702
- Stats at Baseball Reference

Teams
- Kansas City Royals (2007–2013, 2015–2016)

Career highlights and awards
- World Series champion (2015)
Medals
Men's baseball
Representing United States
World University Championship
Gold medal – first place	2004 Tainan	Team

Luke Anthony Hochevar (/ˈhoʊtʃeɪvər/; born September 15, 1983) is an American former professional baseball pitcher. He played college baseball at the University of Tennessee, and played in Major League Baseball (MLB) for the Kansas City Royals from 2007 through 2016. He was the first overall pick in the 2006 Major League Baseball draft and a member of the 2015 World Series champions.

== Early life ==
Hochevar was born in Denver, Colorado, raised in Wiley, Colorado, and later moved to Fowler, Colorado, with parents Brian and Carmen Hochevar along with one brother and one sister. His father was a college basketball player at the University of Southern Colorado (now CSU Pueblo) who had an unsuccessful tryout with the Denver Nuggets and who later turned to coaching, including serving as Luke's baseball coach at Fowler High School. While at Fowler High, Hochevar was named Colorado Division 2A Player of the Year his senior year and was a three-time all-state selection. He was a multi-sport athlete, earning all-state honors in basketball. Hochevar excelled in the classroom as well, and was named an academic all-state four consecutive years.

== College career ==
Hochevar was selected by the Los Angeles Dodgers in the 39th round (1,191st overall) of the 2002 Major League Baseball draft, but he chose to attend college at the University of Tennessee instead. Hochevar was used primarily as a relief pitcher during his freshman year for the Volunteers, striking out 73 batters and walking 24 in 77 innings of work. After the 2003 season, he played collegiate summer baseball with the Cotuit Kettleers of the Cape Cod Baseball League. His sophomore season was injury plagued for Hochevar; he missed a total of eight weeks playing time. However, he was good enough to be selected for the USA Baseball National Team, earning the victory in the FISU II World University Baseball Championship against Japan. Hochevar bounced back as a junior, striking out a school record 154 batters, posting a 15–3 record, and 2.26 ERA for the season. For his efforts, he was named the Southeastern Conference Pitcher of the Year and won the Roger Clemens Award.

== Professional career ==
=== Draft and minor leagues ===
The Dodgers selected Hochevar again, this time in the first round (40th overall) of the 2005 MLB draft. After initial negotiations between the Dodgers and Hochevar and his agent Scott Boras, Hochevar switched agents to Matt Sosnick and accepted a $2.98 million signing bonus from scouting director Logan White. However, the next day Hochevar changed his mind on switching agents, returning to Boras and reneging on the deal. Several months of lukewarm talks continued, but amidst much bitterness, the two sides never came close to reaching a new agreement. Hochevar signed with the Fort Worth Cats of the American Association of Professional Baseball, an independent baseball league. He had a 1–1 win–loss record and a 2.38 earned run average (ERA) in four games started with Fort Worth.

Hochevar entered the draft yet again in 2006 and was selected first overall by the Kansas City Royals. On August 3, nearly two months after the draft, Hochevar signed a four-year major league contract worth $5.25 million guaranteed with the Royals. He received a $3.5 million signing bonus with the ability to earn as much as $7 million over the four years. After he signed, the Royals assigned Hochevar to the Single-A Burlington Bees of the Midwest League. In four starts, Hochevar posted an 0–1 record, a 1.17 ERA, and 16 strikeouts in 15 1/3 innings pitched.

Hochevar began the 2007 season with the Double-A Wichita Wranglers of the Texas League, going 3–6 with a 4.69 ERA in 17 games (16 starts). He also led the Texas League in strikeouts (94) and innings pitched (94) at the time of his promotion to the Triple-A Omaha Royals on July 11. At midseason, he was chosen to appear in the 2007 All-Star Futures Game, and tossed a scoreless inning during his appearance. In 10 starts with Omaha, Hochevar went 1–3 with a 5.12 ERA.

=== Kansas City Royals ===
==== 2007–2010 ====
On September 5, 2007, Hochevar was recalled to the Royals for the first time. He made his major league debut against the New York Yankees on September 8, throwing three shutout innings in an 11-5 loss. In four appearances (one start), Hochevar had a 0–1 record and a 2.13 ERA.

After competing for a rotation spot during spring training in 2008, Hochevar was optioned to Triple-A Omaha on March 23. On April 20, he was recalled from Omaha, and made the start that day against the Oakland Athletics. He allowed six earned runs on nine hits in 4 2/3 innings to earn the loss. In his next start on April 26, Hochevar earned his first MLB win, allowing one earned run in six innings to help the Royals to a 2–1 win over the Toronto Blue Jays. In 2008, he had the lowest run support of all major league pitchers, with an average of 2.8 runs per game started, finishing with a record of 6–12. His ERA though, was a high one, finishing at 5.51 in 22 starts.

Following the Royals' 2009 spring training, Hochevar was optioned to Omaha to learn to "use both sides of the plate with more consistency" and to stay away from big innings. He was called up to the Royals' starting rotation on May 10.

In his 2009 debut on May 12, Hochevar lasted just two innings and surrendered eight runs in a loss to the Athletics. On June 12, Hochevar tossed an 80-pitch complete game, only allowing three hits and one run; this was a feat that had only been accomplished by five American League pitchers in the previous 20 years. On July 25, Hochevar recorded a career-high 13 strikeouts over seven innings in a 6–3 win over the Texas Rangers. On September 18, Hochevar threw his first career shutout in an 11–0 win over the Chicago White Sox.

Despite these accomplishments, Hochevar struggled with his consistency through the 2009 season, posting the highest ERA of AL starters (6.55) while going 7–13 in 25 starts.

In his first start of the year on April 7, 2010, Hochevar threw 7 2/3 scoreless innings in a 3–2 win in 11 innings over the Detroit Tigers. On June 16, he was placed on the disabled list with a strained right elbow. At the time, he was 5–4 with a 4.96 ERA in 13 starts. He returned near the end of the season, and finished at 6–6 with a 4.81 ERA in 18 games (17 starts).

==== 2011–2013 ====
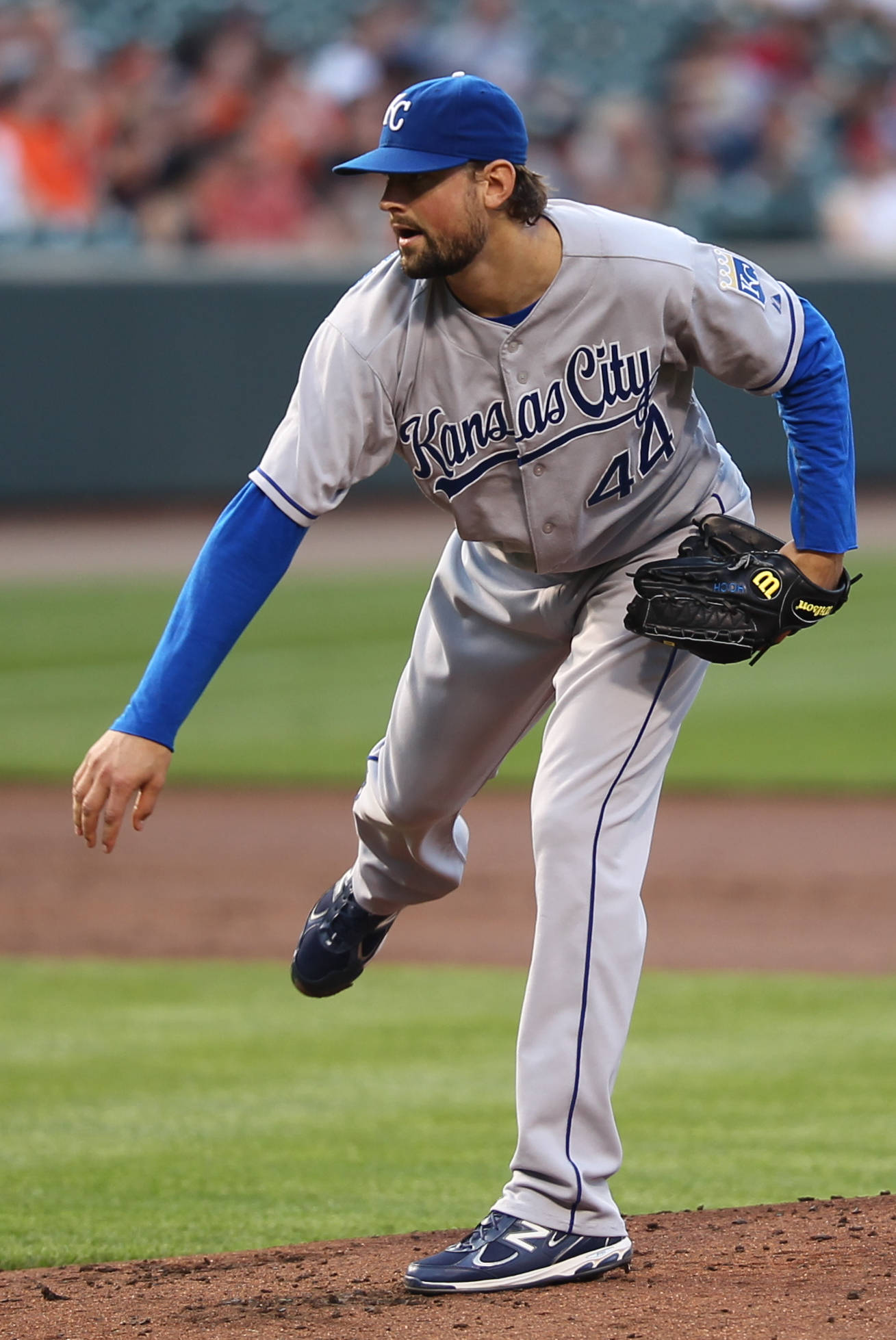
Hochevar with the Royals in 2011

In March 2011, Hochevar was named the Royals' Opening Day starter for the first time. He gave up four runs (three earned) while striking out five in 5 2/3 innings to earn the loss against the Los Angeles Angels of Anaheim. At the All-Star break, he had a win–loss record of 5–8 with a 5.46 ERA. He fared significantly better after the break, ending the season with an 11–11 record, a 4.68 ERA, and a 1.28 WHIP in 31 starts.

Hochevar's strong finish in 2011 suggested that he might emerge as a top-quality starting pitcher in 2012. Instead, he experienced a disappointing season, finishing with an 8–16 record and a 5.73 ERA in 32 starts. He allowed more earned runs than any other major league pitcher, and his -1.1 WAR (Wins Above Replacement) was the worst of his career.

On January 15, 2013, Hochevar filed for salary arbitration, the only Royals player to do so in the off-season, and the second year in a row that he has done so. In 2012, he and the team settled on a one-year deal worth $3.51 million. The Royals announced on January 18, 2013, that they had reached an agreement with Hochevar on a one-year, $4.56 million contract, thus avoiding arbitration.

On March 13, 2013, Royals manager Ned Yost announced that Hochevar would not begin the season in the starting rotation. Hochevar was instead assigned to the bullpen for middle relief duties. In that role, he performed effectively for the Royals, posting a 5–2 record, two saves, and a 1.92 ERA in 58 relief appearances. He also struck out 82 batters while walking only 17 in 70 1/3 innings.

==== 2014–2016 ====
During a Spring Training game against the White Sox on March 3, 2014, Hochevar suffered an elbow injury and left the game. An MRI the following day showed a tear of the UCL in the right elbow. On March 7, 2014, Royals officials confirmed the injury and stated Hochevar would be undergoing Tommy John surgery to repair the damage. The surgery caused Hochevar to miss the entire 2014 season.

On December 3, 2014, Hochevar signed a two-year, $10 million contract with the Royals. He made 49 appearances in the 2015 season, with a record of 1–1, one save, and an ERA of 3.73. Hochevar was the winning pitcher in the deciding Game 5 of the World Series. It was the Royals' first championship in 30 years. He made nine total appearances in the postseason, going 2–0 without allowing an earned run in 10 2/3 innings.

In 2016, Hochevar made 40 appearances, finishing the year 2–3 with a 3.86 ERA. On November 5, 2016, the Royals declined their 2017 option on Hochevar, making him a free agent for the first time of his career.

On August 13, 2018, Hochevar announced his retirement.

== Pitching style ==
Hochevar had a wide variety of pitches: a four-seam fastball and sinker that averaged about 93 mph, a cutter averaging 89, a slider at 85, a curveball in the high 70s, and a changeup in the low 80s. He used five of the pitches to both right-handed and left-handed hitters, eschewing only the slider to lefties and the changeup to righties. His wide pitch variety could make him unpredictable to hitters; even in full counts, Hochevar threw his four-seamer, sinker, cutter, and slider in roughly equal proportions.

== Personal ==
Hochevar comes from a family of athletes. In addition to his father's college basketball career and success as a high school and college baseball coach, Luke's sister Brittany was a volleyball standout at Long Beach State and played beach volleyball for the AVP Pro Beach Volleyball tour.

In August 2016, Hochevar had surgery to repair nerve damage in his throwing arm caused by thoracic outlet syndrome.

Hochevar and his wife, Ashley, married in January 2007. They have two daughters and one son.
