= Allegiant =

Allegiant may refer to:

- Allegiant Air, an American airline
- Allegiant Athletic Agency, a sport representation agency
- Allegiant General Pryde, a character in the Star Wars film series
- Allegiant Stadium, in Paradise, NV
- Allegiant (novel), a 2013 novel by Veronica Roth
- The Divergent Series: Allegiant, a 2016 film based on the 2013 novel

== See also ==
- Allegiance (disambiguation)
