= Matt Ford (baseball) =

American baseball player (born 1981)

- Pitcher
- Born: April 8, 1981 (age 44); Plantation, Florida, U.S.
- Batted: Left Threw: Left

MLB debut
- April 2, 2003, for the Milwaukee Brewers

Last MLB appearance
- July 20, 2003, for the Milwaukee Brewers

MLB statistics
- Win–loss record: 0–3
- Earned run average: 4.33
- Strikeouts: 26
- Stats at Baseball Reference

Teams
- Milwaukee Brewers (2003)

Matthew Lee Ford (born April 8, 1981) is an American former left-handed professional baseball pitcher. He played one season for the Milwaukee Brewers, and currently works as a coach in the Pittsburgh Pirates organization.

== Baseball career ==
Ford was born in Plantation, Florida, and is Jewish.

=== High school ===
Ford attended J. P. Taravella High School in Coral Springs, Florida. Ford was named Broward County High School player of the year in 1998–99. He was USA Today All-USA honorable mention in 1999.

=== Professional career ===
In June 1999 he was drafted by the Toronto Blue Jays in the 3rd round of the draft. In his first season in the minor leagues in 1999, he was 4–0 with a 2.05 ERA at Medicine Hat, averaging 6 hits and 13 strikeouts per 9 innings. In 2002, he was 9–5 with a 2.37 ERA at Dunedin, winning the Florida State League's ERA title.

In December 2002, Ford was drafted by the Milwaukee Brewers from the Blue Jays in the Rule 5 draft. In 2003, he pitched in 25 games for the Brewers, with a 0–3 win–loss record and a 4.33 ERA. Ford appeared in the 2004 Baseball America Prospect Handbook as the # 2 left-handed reliever on Milwaukee's minor league depth chart. He had bone spurs removed from his pitching elbow before the 2004 season. In May 2005, he was released by the Brewers.

In June 2005 he signed as a free agent with the Kansas City Royals, but they released him the next month. In 2006, he played for Rochester, the AAA team of the Minnesota Twins, and in 33 games was 1–2 with a 4.50 ERA, while throwing a 93 mph (150 km/h) fastball. In 2007, he signed with the York Revolution of the independent Atlantic League of Professional Baseball, then joined the Bridgeport Bluefish of the Atlantic League to start 2008. He finished the season with the Schaumburg Flyers of the Northern League. After not playing from 2009–2013, including a stint as the assistant baseball coach at the University of Akron, he signed a minor league contract with the Pittsburgh Pirates in January 2014 in an attempt to make a comeback, although he never pitched a game in their system.

Ford has been a pitching coach in the Pittsburgh Pirates organization since 2014.

== Miscellaneous ==
Ford is proud of his Jewish heritage. "I got the (major league Jewish baseball players) card set when I was in the majors in 2003, and I was on a card set with Sandy Koufax, so I thought that was pretty neat and there weren’t too many of us, so it was pretty special that way," Ford said.

His agent is Matt Sosnick.
