= Curt Farrier =

American football player (born 1941)

No. 70
- Position: Defensive tackle

Personal information
- Born: June 25, 1941 (age 85); Yakima, Washington, U.S.
- Listed height: 6 ft 6 in (1.98 m)
- Listed weight: 264 lb (120 kg)

Career information
- High school: Everett (WA)
- College: Montana State
- NFL draft: 1963: 10th round, 127th overall pick
- AFL draft: 1963: 10th round, 80th overall pick

Career history
- Kansas City Chiefs (1963–1965)
- Stats at Pro Football Reference

Curtis James Farrier (born June 25, 1941) is an American former professional football defensive tackle. He played for the Kansas City Chiefs from 1963 to 1965.
