= Miško Ražnatović =

Serbian lawyer, sports agent, and basketball player (born 1966)

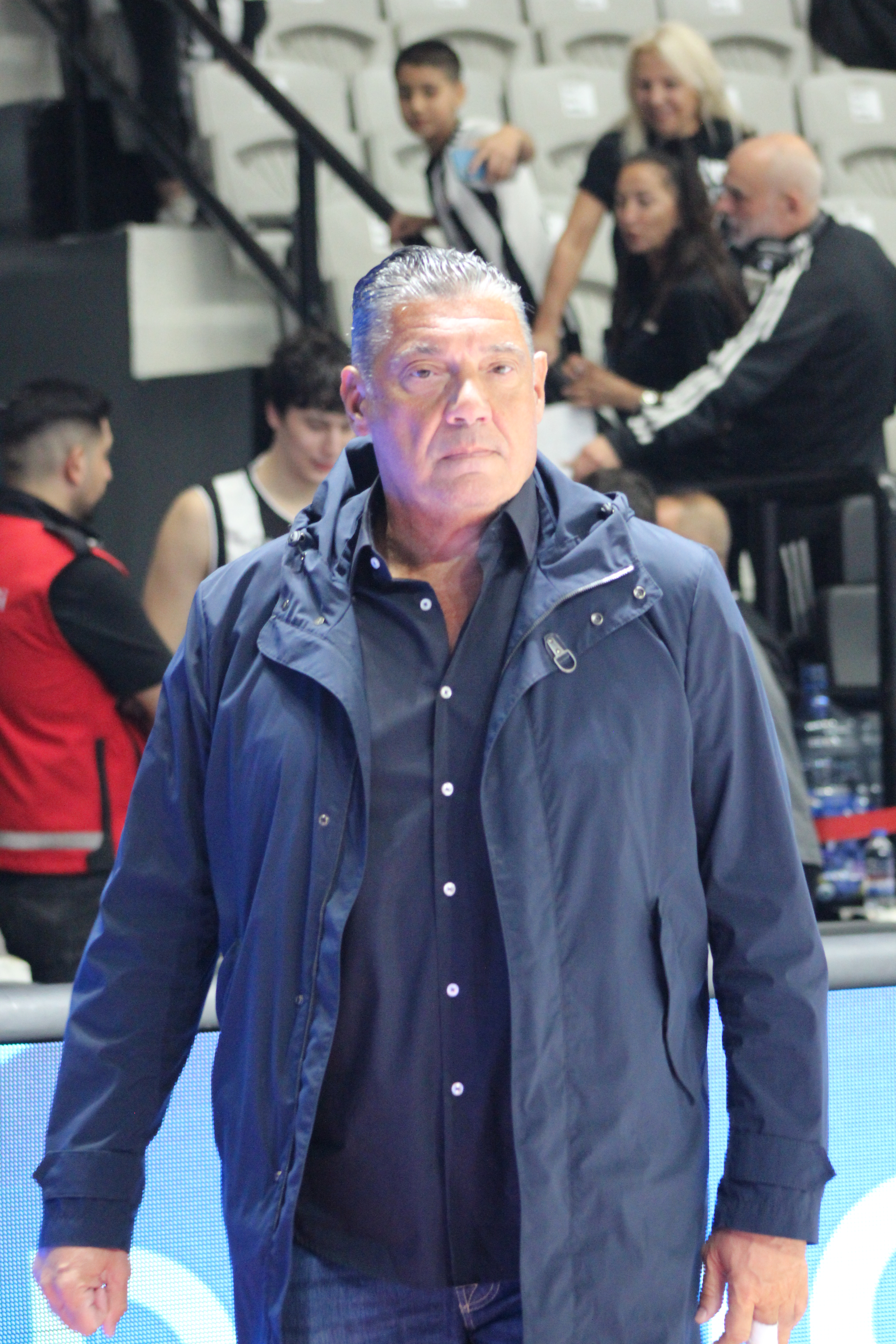
- Ražnatović in October 2024
- Born: Miodrag Ražnatović; September 16, 1966 (age 59); Kruševac, SR Serbia, SFR Yugoslavia
- Education: University of Belgrade
- Occupations: Lawyer; basketball agent; basketball player
- Employer: BeoBasket
- Basketball career

Career information
- NBA draft: 1988: undrafted
- Playing career: 1984–2004

Career history
- 1986–1987: Ulcinj
- 1987–1989: Radnički Belgrade
- Napredak Kruševac
- FMP
- ?–2004: Banjica

Miodrag "Miško" Ražnatović (Serbian Cyrillic: Миодраг Мишко Ражнатовић; born September 16, 1966) is a Serbian lawyer, sports agent, and former professional basketball player. He is the chairman, CEO, and founder of the BeoBasket agency and FIBA-certified agent.

As a basketball agent, Ražnatović negotiated and finalized some of the largest deals in European basketball during the 2000s and 2010s.

== Playing career ==
Ražnatović played for Napredak Kruševac, FMP, Radnički Belgrade, Ulcinj.

== Legal career ==
Ražnatović earned his law degree from the University of Belgrade Faculty of Law in 1988. Four years later, he opened his own law firm and started his legal career.

Also, he represented Serbian football manager Radomir Antić in his 2009 contract negotiations with Football Association of Serbia (FSS).

== Basketball agent career ==
Through his agency BeoBasket, Ražnatović mostly represents European basketball players and coaches as well as American players playing in Europe. He represents many of the highest-paid European basketball stars in EuroLeague. His notable clients include Nikola Jokić, Boban Marjanović, Dario Šarić, Ivica Zubac, Goga Bitadze, Vasilije Micić, Brandon Davies, Kyle Hines, Vladimir Lučić, Jan Vesely, Nemanja Bjelica, Marko Gudurić, Nemanja Nedović, Josh Nebo, Ante Žižić, Rodrigue Beaubois, Billy Baron, coach Ergin Ataman, coach Saša Obradović, coach Dejan Radonjić, coach Neven Spahija, coach Dejan Milojević, coach Vassilis Spanoulis, etc. Ražnatović was additionally involved in the Deron Williams' transfer to Beşiktaş during the 2011 NBA lockout.

In the 2017–18 EuroLeague season, BeoBasket represented 35 players, and they were the first-ranked agency. In the 2018–19 EuroLeague season, BeoBasket represented 43 players, and they were the first-ranked agency. In the 2019–20 EuroLeague season, BeoBasket represented 42 players, and they were again the first-ranked agency. In the 2020–21 EuroLeague season, BeoBasket represented 46 players, and they were again the first-ranked agency. In the 2021–22 EuroLeague season, BeoBasket represented total 52 players which was the new record and again, they were the first-ranked agency.

Ražnatović represented many former NBA players:

- (Bosnia and Herzegovina) Džanan Musa
- (Bosnia and Herzegovina) Mirza Teletović
- (Croatia) Ante Žižić
- (Czech Republic) Jan Veselý
- (France) Joffrey Lauvergne
- (France) Timothé Luwawu-Cabarrot
- (France) Adam Mokoka
- (Germany) Paul Zipser
- (Greece) Vassilis Spanoulis
- (Montenegro) Omar Cook
- (Montenegro) Nikola Peković
- (North Macedonia) Pero Antić
- (Serbia) Marko Gudurić
- (Serbia) Nemanja Nedović
- (Serbia) Nenad Krstić
- (United States) Jared Cunningham
- (United States) Brandon Davies
- (United States) Darrun Hilliard
- (United States) DeMarcus Nelson
- (United States) Khyri Thomas
- (United States) Deron Williams

Ražnatović represents numerous active NBA players:

- (Croatia) Dario Šarić
- (Croatia) Ivica Zubac
- (Georgia (country)) Goga Bitadze
- (Montenegro) Marko Simonović
- (Mexico) Juan Toscano-Anderson
- (Serbia) Nikola Jokić
- (Serbia) Nikola Jović
- (Serbia) Boban Marjanović
- (Slovenia) Vlatko Čančar
- (Turkey) Cedi Osman
