= Grady Sizemore =

American baseball player, coach and manager (born 1982)

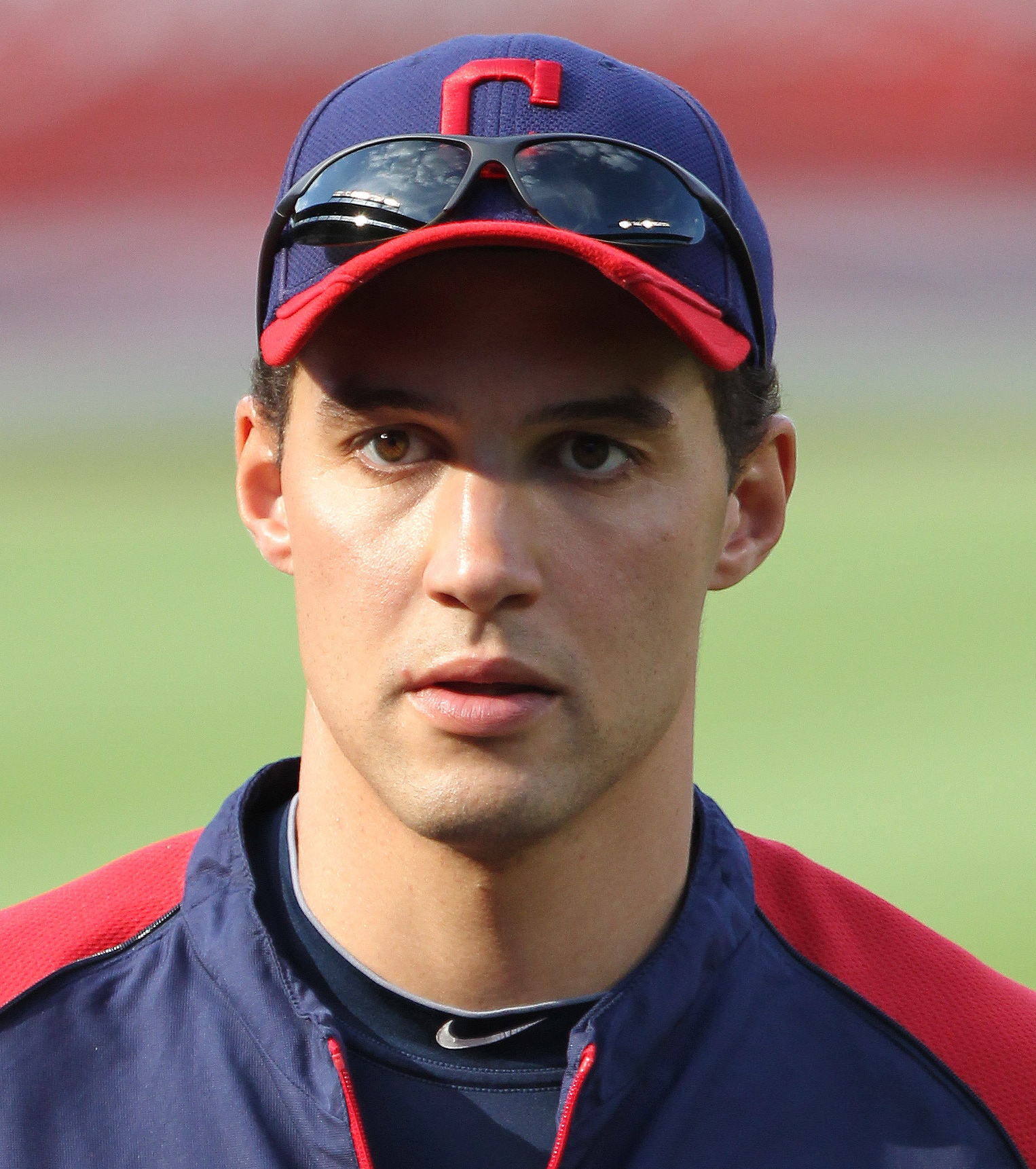
- Sizemore with the Cleveland Indians in 2011

Minnesota Twins – No. 0
- Center fielder / Manager / Coach
- Born: August 2, 1982 (age 43); Seattle, Washington, U.S.
- Batted: Left Threw: Left

MLB debut
- July 21, 2004, for the Cleveland Indians

Last MLB appearance
- October 3, 2015, for the Tampa Bay Rays

MLB statistics
- Batting average: .265
- Home runs: 150
- Runs batted in: 518
- Managerial record: 13–32
- Winning %: .289
- Stats at Baseball Reference

Teams
- As player: Cleveland Indians (2004–2011); Boston Red Sox (2014); Philadelphia Phillies (2014–2015); Tampa Bay Rays (2015); As manager: Chicago White Sox (2024); As coach: Chicago White Sox (2024–2025); Minnesota Twins (2026–present)

Career highlights and awards
- 3× All-Star (2006–2008); 2× Gold Glove Award (2007, 2008); Silver Slugger Award (2008)

Grady Sizemore (born August 2, 1982) is an American former professional baseball center fielder, coach and manager who currently serves as the first base coach and the outfield and base running instructor for the Minnesota Twins of Major League Baseball (MLB). He played in MLB for the Cleveland Indians from 2004 through 2011, but did not play in the majors for the following two years after a series of injuries. He returned in 2014 with the Boston Red Sox and played for the Philadelphia Phillies from 2014 to 2015 before finishing 2015 with the Tampa Bay Rays. He was a three-time MLB All-Star and a two-time Gold Glove Award winner, and also won a Silver Slugger Award.

== Early life ==
Sizemore was born in Seattle, Washington on August 2, 1982. His father is African-American and his mother is White. He graduated from Cascade High School in Everett, Washington, in 2000. A high school athlete in football, basketball and baseball, Sizemore signed a letter of intent to play football and baseball at the University of Washington. At the time of his high school graduation, Sizemore was Cascade's all-time leader in rushing yards, with 3,081. Sizemore graduated from high school with a 3.85 GPA.

== Playing career ==
=== Draft and minors ===
The Montreal Expos selected Sizemore in the third round (75th overall) of the 2000 Major League Baseball draft. The team offered him a $2 million signing bonus to lure him away from college to which Sizemore agreed.

On June 27, 2002, the Expos traded Sizemore, along with Cliff Lee, Brandon Phillips and Lee Stevens, to the Cleveland Indians in exchange for Bartolo Colón and Tim Drew.

=== Cleveland Indians ===
==== 2004–2007 ====
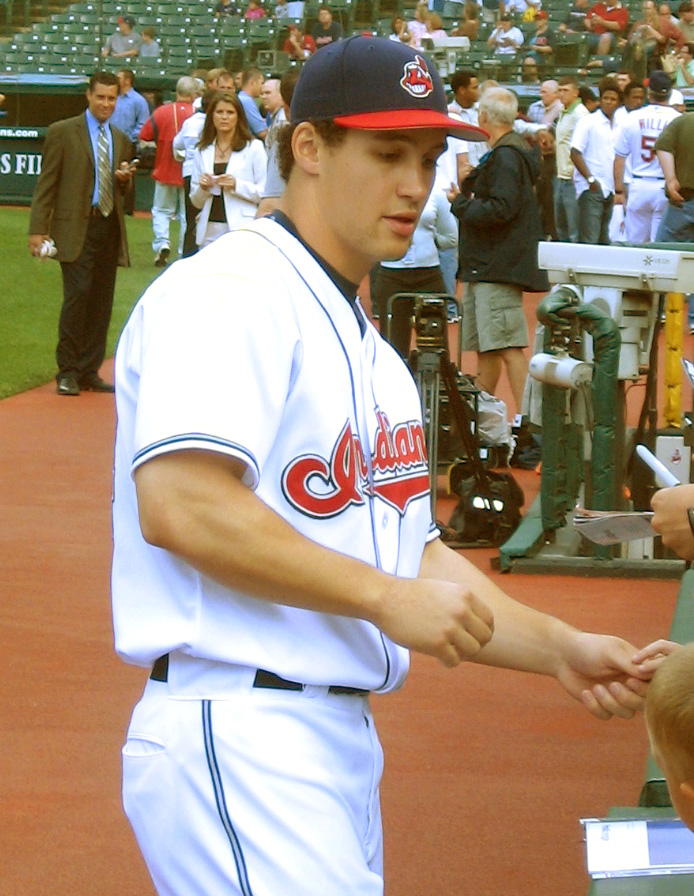
Sizemore signing autographs in 2006 with the Indians

Sizemore received his first call-up to the majors on July 21, 2004. He made his major league debut that day against the Chicago White Sox as a defensive replacement in center field. Sizemore finished the rest of the season with a .246 average, four home runs, and 24 RBI in 43 games played.

In 2005, Sizemore played his first full season in the majors. He quickly established himself as one of baseball's up and coming stars in center field. Although he was supposed to start the season in Triple-A, an injury to Juan González before Opening Day secured Sizemore's spot on Cleveland's roster. He was soon named the leadoff hitter of the Indians' lineup. Sizemore also joined Roberto Alomar as the only players in franchise history to record 20 doubles, 10 triples, 20 home runs and 20 stolen bases in the same season. Sizemore's best month came in June when he hit .377 (40-for-106) with four home runs and 16 RBI in 25 games. He finished the season batting .289 with 22 home runs, 81 RBI, and 22 stolen bases in 158 games.

Before the start of the 2006 season, Sizemore signed a six-year contract with the Indians worth $23.45 million with a club option for 2012. In 2006, Sizemore was selected to his first All-Star Game as a reserve outfielder. Overall, Sizemore played in all 162 games and batted .290 with 28 home runs, 76 RBI, and a .907 OPS. His 53 doubles, 92 extra-base hits and 134 runs scored led the majors. In addition, he became only the second player in MLB history to have at least 50 doubles, 10 triples, 25 home runs, and 20 stolen bases in a single season, the first being Chuck Klein in 1932.

Sizemore opened 2007 by hitting four home runs in his first six games. He hit a three-run inside-the-park home run on April 27. The May 14 issue of Sports Illustrated magazine featured Sizemore on the cover. In the cover article, Indians' general manager Mark Shapiro called Sizemore "without a doubt one of the greatest players of our generation".

On July 1, Sizemore was named to his second All-Star team. In 2007, he batted .277 with 24 home runs and 78 RBI in 162 games, and stole 33 bases in 43 attempts. He was one of six batters in the AL to have at least 20 home runs and 20 stolen bases, along with Alex Rodriguez, Gary Sheffield, Ian Kinsler, B. J. Upton, and Curtis Granderson. Sizemore also saw his first career postseason action in 2007, batting .279 with two doubles, two home runs, eight walks and 3 RBI in 11 games. On November 6, it was announced that Sizemore had earned his first Gold Glove, after he posted a .995 fielding percentage with two errors and displaying his reputation for great range in center field and acrobatic catches.

==== 2008 ====
Sizemore's streak of 382 consecutive games played ended on April 27 due to a sprained ankle sustained the preceding day. On July 2, Sizemore hit his twentieth home run and stole his twentieth base, marking his fourth straight 20–20 year. He was the only AL hitter to hit at least 20 home runs and steal at least 20 bases each year during 2005–08.

Sizemore was named to the American League All-Star Team for the third consecutive year. He also was a participant in the 2008 Home Run Derby, where he hit six home runs, but did not advance to the second round. Sizemore also participated in the 2008 All-Star Game, and he played 11 innings as the game extended into the 15th inning.

On August 21, Sizemore hit his 29th home run of the season against the Kansas City Royals, setting a new career-high. He also recorded a career-high 7 RBI in the 10–3 win. On August 25, Sizemore hit his 30th and 31st home run against Armando Galarraga of the Detroit Tigers, becoming the 32nd member of the 30–30 club.

Sizemore finished the 2008 season with a .268 average, 33 home runs, 90 RBI and 38 stolen bases in 157 games. For his efforts in 2008, Sizemore was awarded his second consecutive Gold Glove (his .995 fielding percentage was second among AL center fielders). He was also awarded his first Silver Slugger Award. He led the major leagues in power-speed number (35.3).

==== 2009 season ====
Sizemore initially committed to play for Team USA in the 2009 World Baseball Classic, but backed out of it after injuring his left groin early in spring training. On April 16, Sizemore hit the first grand slam home run at the new Yankee Stadium off New York reliever Dámaso Marte. It was his third career grand slam.

On September 9, after struggling through a subpar season, Sizemore elected to have surgery on his left elbow, which had troubled him since spring training. Having the surgery performed one month before season's end allowed for more healing time and preparation for the following year. Cleveland was already eliminated from playoff contention by the time of his decision. One week after the elbow surgery, he also elected to have surgery on his lower abdomen to repair a hernia that was related to the groin injury, which prevented him from taking part in the World Baseball Classic, thus ending his 2009 season one month before the final game. In 106 games, Sizemore hit .248 with 20 doubles, six triples, 18 home runs and 64 RBI.

==== 2010–2013 ====
After playing in 33 games in 2010 (.211 average, 13 RBI), Sizemore's season prematurely ended after microfracture surgery was performed on his left knee.

Sizemore returned to Cleveland after going through a rehab assignment with Triple-A Columbus Clippers, on April 17, 2011. Sizemore went 2-for-4 with a double and home run in his return, helping Cleveland to a 4–2 win. Sizemore returned to the disabled list in May with a right knee contusion after sliding into a base. In mid-July, Sizemore was again placed on the disabled list following another injury to his right knee; shortly afterwards, he had a second sports hernia surgery, which was expected to sideline him until early September. Through 2011, he had the third-best career fielding percentage of all active major league outfielders (.9935), behind Shane Victorino and Ryan Braun. On October 31, the Indians declined Sizemore's 2012 contract option.

After meeting with both the Boston Red Sox and Seattle Mariners during the offseason, Sizemore re-signed with Cleveland, signing a one-year, $5 million contract. Sizemore underwent back surgery during spring training, and began the season on the 60-day disabled list. A series of setbacks in his recovery from back and knee surgeries prevented him from appearing in any games during the season. Sizemore had microfracture surgery on his right knee in September, after a previous arthroscopic procedure in 2011 was unsuccessful in healing his ailing knee. Sizemore remained a free agent through the 2013 MLB season. According to his agent, Joe Urbon, Sizemore did not want to commit to a team until he was healthy enough to play again.

=== Boston Red Sox ===
On January 22, 2014, Sizemore signed with the Boston Red Sox. The contract was for one year with a base salary of $750,000, with incentives that would increase the total to up to $6 million. On March 28, Sizemore was named the team's starting center fielder for the season opener after beating out Jackie Bradley Jr. in spring training. On Opening Day against the Baltimore Orioles, he hit a solo home run just over the right field scoreboard. He also hit a three-run home run against former teammate CC Sabathia in a game versus the New York Yankees on April 11. On June 17, Sizemore was designated for assignment to make room for top prospect Garin Cecchini. The next day on June 18, the Red Sox officially released Sizemore. He hit .216 with two home runs and 15 RBI in 52 games with the team. For his brief time in Boston, Sizemore made $1.25 million.

=== Philadelphia Phillies ===
On June 24, 2014, Sizemore signed a minor league deal with the Philadelphia Phillies. On July 11, Sizemore was called up from Triple-A Lehigh Valley in order to join the Phillies rotation of outfielders. On July 25, Sizemore collected his 1,000th career hit, in a game against the Arizona Diamondbacks. After a successful start, Phillies general manager Rubén Amaro Jr. suggested Sizemore could be part of the Phillies longer-term plans if his success continued. He was signed to a one-year, $2 million contract for the 2015 season on October 23. He collected four hits in one game against the Diamondbacks on May 16, 2015. Sizemore was designated for assignment by the Phillies on May 29, 2015. At the time, he was hitting .245 with 6 RBI in 39 games. He was released on June 1, 2015.

=== Tampa Bay Rays ===
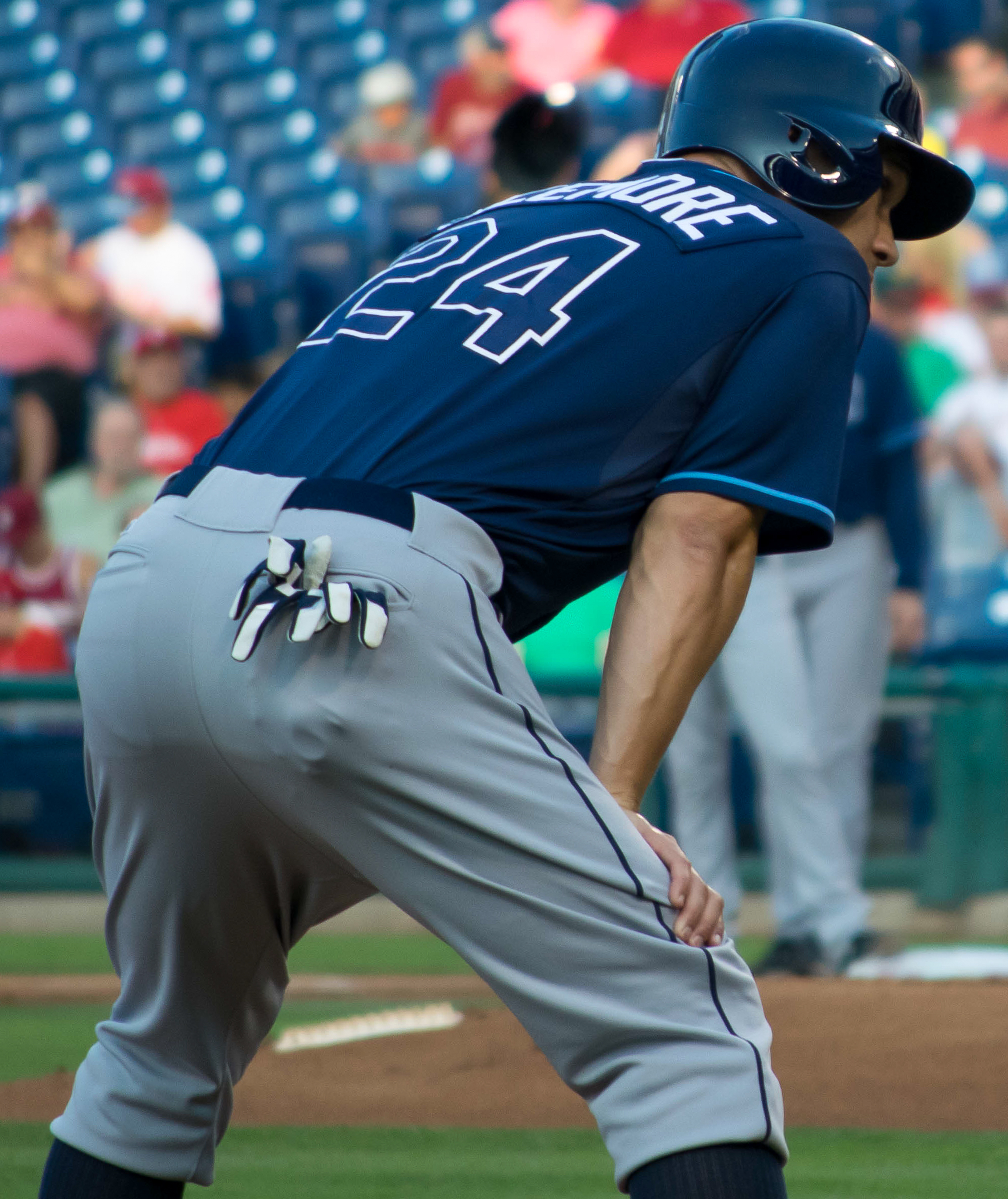
Sizemore with the Tampa Bay Rays in 2015

On June 15, 2015, Sizemore signed a minor league deal with the Tampa Bay Rays. On June 28, he was called up by the Rays, and finished 3-for-5 with an RBI in his first game with the team that day. In 57 games with the Rays, Sizemore hit .257 with six home runs and 27 RBI. He became a free agent at the end of the 2015 season and did not play in 2016.

== Post-playing career ==
On February 14, 2017, the Cleveland Indians hired Sizemore as a special advisor to the team's player development department in the front office. He stepped away from the position so that he could devote his time to his young children.

In 2023, Sizemore asked Josh Barfield, his former teammate who was the director of player development for the Arizona Diamondbacks, about joining the organization. All positions were full, and Sizemore accepted a $15-an-hour internship with Mike Hazen, the general manager for the Diamondbacks, for the 2023 season. After the season, Barfield became assistant general manager for the Chicago White Sox, and he recommended Sizemore for a position. The White Sox hired Sizemore to their coaching staff for the 2024 season.

On August 8, 2024, the White Sox named Sizemore their interim manager after the club fired Pedro Grifol. The team was 28–89 by the time Sizemore was appointed. Under Sizemore, the team went 13–32 and finished the season with a record of 41–121, breaking the MLB record for most losses within a modern-era season. Of their last 6 games, Sizemore’s White Sox won 5, barely surpassing the record.

Sizemore was named as the White Sox's Offensive Coordinator for the 2025 season.

On November 12, 2025, the Minnesota Twins hired Sizemore to serve as the team's first base coach and primary outfield and baserunning instructor.

== Managerial record ==
As of games played on September 29, 2024

Team	Year	Regular season					Postseason			
Team	Year	Games	Won	Lost	Win %	Finish	Won	Lost	Win %	Result
CWS	2024	45	13	32	.289	5th in AL Central	–	–	–	
Total		45	13	32	.289				–	

== Personal life ==
Sizemore and his wife, Brittany, have three children. They live in Scottsdale, Arizona.

== See also ==
- Cleveland Guardians award winners and league leaders
- List of Major League Baseball annual doubles leaders
- List of Major League Baseball annual runs scored leaders
- List of people from Everett, Washington

Awards and achievements
Preceded by Víctor Martínez	Indians' Minor League Player of the Year (the Lou Boudreau Award); 2003	Succeeded by Ryan Garko
