= Everett High School (Washington) =

Public high school in Everett, Washington, USA

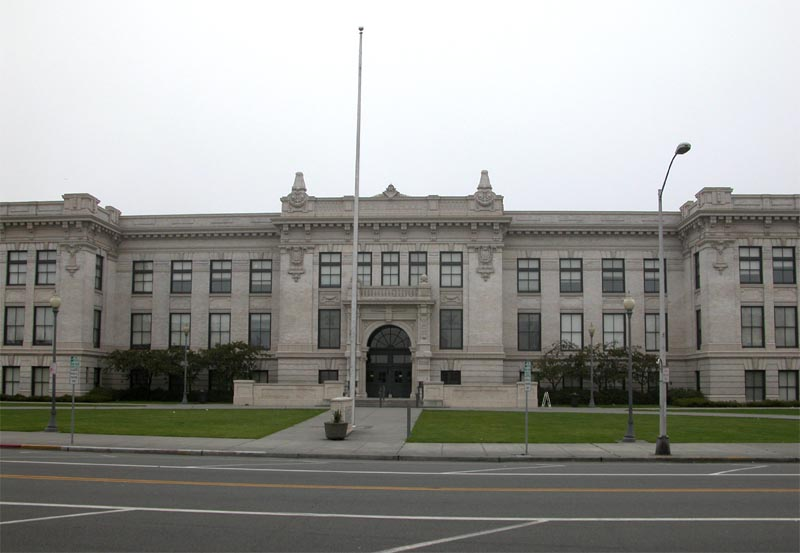
- Everett High School's "A Building"

Location
- 2416 Colby Avenue; Everett, Washington 98201; United States; 47°59′7″N 122°12′29″W

Information
- Type: Public high school
- Motto: School Of Champions
- Established: 1891
- School district: Everett School District
- NCES School ID: 530267000395
- Principal: Kelly Shepherd
- Teaching staff: 77.89 (FTE)
- Grades: 9–12
- Enrollment: 1,669 (2023–2024)
- Student to teacher ratio: 21.43
- Colors: Blue & Gold
- Athletics: Wesco 3A
- Mascot: Seagull
- Rival: Cascade High School
- Yearbook: Nesika
- Website: School website
- Everett High School
- U.S. National Register of Historic Places
- Location within Washington (state) Location within the United States
- Location: 2400 Colby Ave., Everett, Washington
- Area: less than one acre
- Built: 1910
- Built by: Jenkins and Jones
- Architect: James Stephen
- Architectural style: Beaux Arts
- NRHP reference No.: 97000493
- Added to NRHP: June 4, 1997

Everett High School is a secondary school located in Everett, Washington, United States, which educates grades 9 through 12. It was founded in 1891 as the first high school in the Everett School District. The incumbent Principal is now Kelly Shepherd who took over the role after Amanda M. Overly, who assumed office after former Principal Lance Balla transferred, quit. The Deputy Principals are E. Heinz, C. Mora, K. Allen.

The school is listed on the National Register of Historic Places.

== History ==
The first high school in Everett was a ten-week course established in 1891, two years before the city's incorporation. Margaret Salisbury was the first graduate of the high school, which expanded into a full four-year curriculum in 1898 while still sharing space with other grades. A separate high school building was constructed in 1902, but the growing student population quickly outgrew the facility, necessitating the use of several portable classrooms.

The first building on the modern Everett High School campus—now named the "A" or Main Building—opened on January 31, 1910, and was designed to accommodate 600 students. It cost $198,000 to construct and was built on land that had hosted a 1905 showing from Buffalo Bill's traveling Wild West show. The building was constructed in two months with new fireproof materials and technologies.

The A Building underwent eight major renovations through the 20th century, including a 1963 addition that added an elevator that covered the entranceway. Most of the changes made in the 1963 addition were demolished by the building's 1995 renovation that restored its historic elements while bringing the A Building up to modern standards. The Everett High School campus expanded to seven buildings over a four-block area around Colby Avenue, with new buildings to house facilities that were formerly in the A Building.

== Athletics ==
Everett High School is part of District One of the Washington Interscholastic Activities Association (WIAA) as a member of the Wesco 3A conference. The school competes as the Seagulls, with its sports split between the conference's North and South divisions; the football team was formerly in the North division, but was moved to the South division when Wesco football realigned with the addition of the Ferndale Golden Eagles and the Squalicum Storm for the 2016 season.

Due to the construction of Everett High School occurring in the city's early years, it does not have on-site facilities for baseball and football; both teams practice and play home games south of the school at Everett Memorial Stadium as a result. The baseball team temporarily practiced on the football field at the stadium complex for the 2017 season and most of the 2018 season due to poor conditions at the baseball park (now known as Funko Field) caused by heavy rain along with simultaneous use by teams from both the school and Everett Community College. The baseball park had its natural grass surface replaced with artificial turf, with the Seagulls hosting their first game on the new surface on April 12, 2018.

1920 EHS football team, U.S. champions.

The school has the claim of winning the unofficial national championship of high school football for the 1920 season. The football team, led by coach Enoch Bagshaw, achieved a perfect season that year; (Note: The school's official record is 9–0–1; the only game that did not end in a win was a tie in an exhibition game versus a squad composed of school alumni before the start of the season.) it was capped off on January 1, 1921, with a 16–7 defeat of East Technical High School from Cleveland, Ohio, at Athletic Field in Everett, now the site of Bagshaw Field at North Middle School. After the season, Bagshaw left to coach for the Washington Huskies football team, leading them to their first Rose Bowl appearance in 1923.

== Notable alumni ==
- Stan Boreson (1925–2017), Norwegian-American comedian and performer
- Mike Champion, former NBA small forward for the Seattle SuperSonics
- Chris Chandler, former NFL quarterback, guided the Atlanta Falcons to the Super Bowl
- Chuck Close (1940–2021), photorealist and abstract artist
- Nancy Coleman (1912–2000), actress in Broadway theatre and Warner Bros. films
- Dennis Erickson, former NFL and college football head coach, last for the Salt Lake Stallions
- Curt Farrier, former NFL and AFL defensive tackle, last for the Kansas City Chiefs
- Bill Iffrig (1934–2024), marathon runner, captured in an iconic photo during the 2013 Boston Marathon bombing
- Henry M. Jackson (1912–1983), Democratic senator and presidential candidate
- Daniel J. Kremer, former presiding justice of the California Fourth District Court of Appeal, Division One
- Jim Lambright (1942–2020), football player and head football coach at the Washington Huskies football
- Jack Lindsay (d. 1898), University of Washington athlete and captain of both the football and basketball teams.
- Chuck Nelson, former NFL placekicker and broadcaster, last playing for the Minnesota Vikings
- Mike Price, former college football head coach, last for UTEP Miners football
- Don Van Patten, former Republican politician and member New Hampshire General Court
- Dick Ward (1909–1966), MLB pitcher, last for the St. Louis Cardinals
- Don White (1919–1987), MLB outfielder for Philadelphia Athletics
- Margaret Wiggum (1919–2013), mother of Matt Groening, the creator of The Simpsons cartoon, and inspiration for Marge Simpson.
