= Bill Iffrig =

American marathon runner (1934–2024)

- Born: William George Iffrig; June 13, 1934; Everett, Washington, U.S.
- Died: January 8, 2024 (aged 89); Marysville, Washington, U.S.
- Occupation: Marathon runner
- Spouse: Donna

William George Iffrig (June 13, 1934 – January 8, 2024) was an American marathon runner. He became well known to the American public after appearing in a photo that captured his fall near the finish line during the Boston Marathon bombing.

== Life and career ==
William George Iffrig was born in Everett, Washington on June 13, 1934, the son of Clarence and Fannie Iffrig. He graduated from Everett High School. He was a carpenter and a brick mason.

In 2013, Iffrig competed at the Boston Marathon. While competing, he fell 60 feet near the finish line after a bomb went off. He gained national attention after his fall was captured by photographer John Tlumacki.

Iffrig died in Marysville, Washington on January 8, 2024, at the age of 89.
