= Drew Rosenhaus =

American sports agent (born 1966)

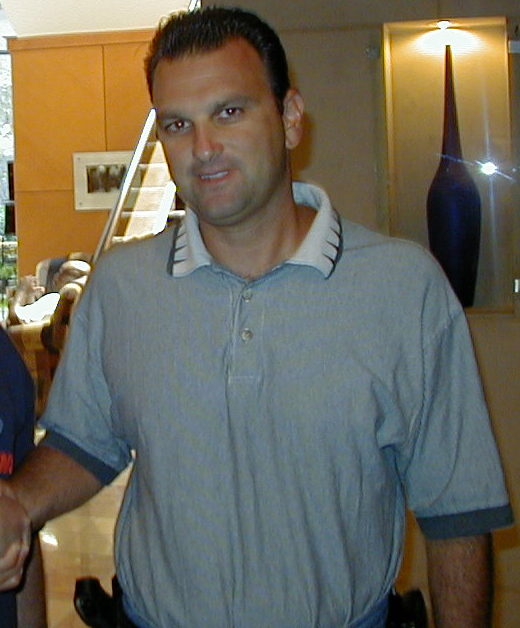
- Rosenhaus in 2003
- Born: Drew Jordan Rosenhaus; October 29, 1966 (age 60); South Orange, New Jersey, U.S.
- Education: University of Miami; Duke University (JD)
- Occupation: NFL sports agent
- Years active: 1989–present

Drew Jordan Rosenhaus (born October 29, 1966) is an American sports agent who represents professional football players. He owns the Miami-based sports agency Rosenhaus Sports, and has negotiated over $7 billion of NFL contracts.

== Early life and education ==
Rosenhaus was born on October 29, 1966, in South Orange, New Jersey. Four years later his family moved to North Miami, Florida. When young, Rosenhaus was a fan of the Miami Dolphins and attended home games and practices.

Rosenhaus attended the University of Miami School of Business at the University of Miami in Coral Gables, Florida, where he graduated in 1987. He attended law school at Duke University School of Law, graduating with a Juris Doctor in 1990.

== Career ==
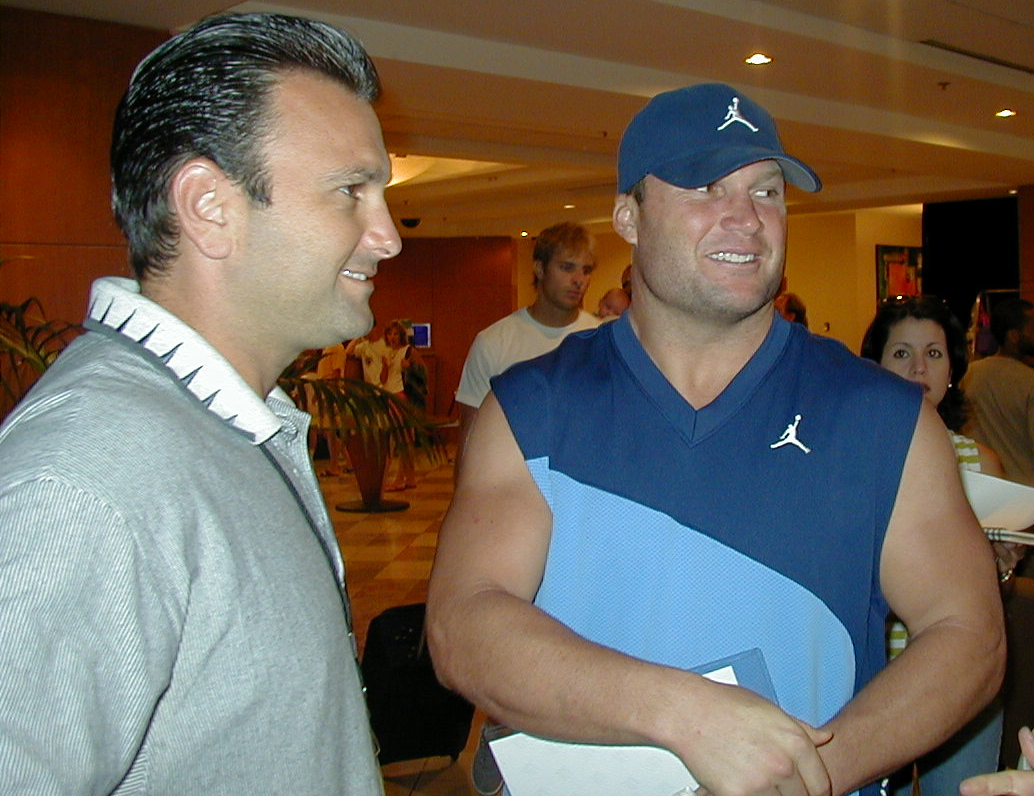
Rosenhaus (left) with client Zach Thomas in 2002

In 1989, Rosenhaus became a registered sports agent and at the age of 22, he was the youngest registered sports agent at the time. As a University of Miami alumnus, many of his clients and contacts came from the Miami Hurricanes football program.

His company operates under the name Rosenhaus Sports Representation (RSR). Other principals in the firm include Rosenhaus' brother Jason, who serves as the firm's vice president, and Robert Bailey, the firm's director of marketing.

After the 2011 NFL Lockout, Rosenhaus negotiated more than 90 contracts, worth about $600 million, in one month.

In 2022, Rosenhaus negotiated a four-year, $120 million contract for then Kansas City Chiefs' wide receiver Tyreek Hill with the Miami Dolphins, which made Hill the highest paid wide receiver in NFL history by average annual contract value and total guaranteed compensation.

== Notable clients ==
Rosenhaus represents more than 170 players, including several high-profile clients, many of which are known for having eccentric personalities. Notable players Rosenhaus has represented or represents include Aaron Jones, Antonio Brown, Chad Johnson, Frank Gore, Rex Grossman, Rob Gronkowski, LeSean McCoy, Jimmy Smith, Plaxico Burress, Terrell Owens, Tyreek Hill, Warren Sapp, and Darren Waller.

=== Willis McGahee ===
In January 2003, University of Miami running back Willis McGahee suffered a complex and serious knee injury in his final college game during the Fiesta Bowl, the national championship game that year. One month later, he signed with Rosenhaus who predicted that, despite the injury, McGahee would be a first round NFL draft pick in the 2003 NFL draft. During the draft, cameras would cut to live shots of McGahee and Rosenhaus talking on their cell phones, giving the impression that they were communicating with teams, even though they were in fact speaking with each other. The Buffalo Bills selected McGahee in the first round as the 23rd overall choice in the draft. After reconstructive surgery and physical rehabilitation, McGahee signed a five-year contract with the Bills worth about $16 million.

=== Terrell Owens ===
After the 2005 Terrell Owens controversy with the Philadelphia Eagles, Rosenhaus attended a press conference with the client. Rosenhaus responded to the majority of journalists' inquiries by asking for the "next question." The incident contributed to the title of Rosenhaus's second book Next Question: An NFL Super Agent's Proven Game Plan for Business Success.

=== Johnny Manziel ===
In March 2016, after his previous agent terminated their contract, Rosenhaus began to represent Johnny Manziel, the first freshman in the history of college football to win the Heisman Trophy, on the condition that Manziel sought treatment for substance abuse. On April 19, after only representing Manziel for a month, Rosenhaus ended his contract with Manziel because he never met his deadline to seek treatment.

== Controversies and allegations ==
=== Investigation into Financial Advisor Relationship ===
In 2012, the NFL Players Association (NFLPA) launched an investigation into whether Rosenhaus's close business ties with Jeff Rubin caused him to breach his fiduciary duties to his clients. Rubin convinced numerous NFL players, including at least 18 Rosenhaus clients such as Terrell Owens, Jevon Kearse and Frank Gore to invest in a failed Alabama casino project. Bankruptcy filings indicated players lost as much as $43.6 million in this venture. Terrell Owens stated that Rosenhaus recommended Rubin to him, saying, "We recommend you use Jeff... we trust him". Owens and other players believed Rosenhaus bore responsibility for their losses. In response, Rosenhaus maintained he was also a victim, had no prior knowledge of Rubin's actions, and did not formally endorse financial advisors to his clients.

=== Arbitration Controversy with DeSean Jackson ===
A dispute with client DeSean Jackson led to a controversy regarding the arbitration process itself. In 2016, a federal judge vacated an NFLPA arbitration award that had been in Rosenhaus's favor against Jackson. The judge ruled that the arbitrator, Roger Kaplan, failed to disclose a "highly unusual" prior financial relationship with Rosenhaus, having been paid $140,000 by Rosenhaus to arbitrate a separate dispute with former employee Danny Martoe. The judge found this created an impression of "evident partiality". Following this, a different arbitrator was appointed to rehear the dispute over the $516,415 Rosenhaus contended Jackson owed him.

== Media appearances ==
Rosenhaus is the author of two books. The first is his autobiography A Shark Never Sleeps: Wheeling and Dealing with the NFL's Most Ruthless Agent, published in 1997. The second book, published in 2008, is Next Question: An NFL Super Agent's Proven Game Plan for Business Success. In 1996, he became the first sports agent to be on the cover of Sports Illustrated.

He has been featured on several television programs including CBS's 60 Minutes, HBO's Real Sports with Bryant Gumbel and Showtime's Inside the NFL. Additionally, Rosenhaus appeared as himself on the sitcom Arli$$ and is a weekly contributor on "Sports Xtra," WSVN Miami's Sunday night sports wrap-up show. He was also featured in ESPN documentaries The U and The Dotted Line.

Rosenhaus has appeared in commercials for Burger King and ESPN's Sportscenter.

Rosenhaus made a cameo appearance in the 1996 film Jerry Maguire. Also, the persona of Bob Sugar was reportedly based on Rosenhaus. In 1998, he appeared as himself in the HBO series, Arli$$. In 1999, he appeared in the movie about professional football, Any Given Sunday.
