= Allegiance (disambiguation) =

Allegiance is the duty which a subject or citizen is widely expected to owe to the state to which he or she belongs.

Allegiance may also refer to:

== Arts, entertainment, and media ==
=== Games ===
- Allegiance (video game), a 2000 computer game originally by Microsoft
- Allegiance: War of Factions, a social/political collectible card game set in a medieval city-state undergoing political turmoil

=== Literature ===
- Allegiance (novel), a novel set in the Star Wars galaxy that was released in January 2007 by Del Rey
- Allegiance, a 2012 fantasy novel by Cayla Kluver and the second book in the Legacy series
- Allegiance, a 2015 historical legal thriller about Japanese-American internment in WWII, authored by law professor Kermit Roosevelt III

=== Music ===
- Allegiance (Australian band), a retired thrash metal band from Perth, Australia
- Allegiance (As Blood Runs Black album), the debut album of deathcore band As Blood Runs Black
- Allegiance (Firewind album), the fourth full-length album by Firewind
- "Allegiance", a song by Dimmu Borgir from their 2003 album Death Cult Armageddon

=== Television ===
- Allegiance (American TV series), an American remake of the Israeli TV series The Gordin Cell
- Allegiance (Canadian TV series), a 2024 drama television series
- "Allegiance" (The Copenhagen Test), a 2025 episode
- "Allegiance" (NCIS: Los Angeles), a 2014 episode
- "Allegiance" (Person of Interest), a 2014 episode
- "Allegiance" (Star Trek: The Next Generation), a 1990 episode
- "Allegiance" (Stargate SG-1), a 2002 episode

=== Other uses in arts, entertainment, and media ===
- Allegiance (film), a 2012 American film about the Iraq War
- Allegiance (musical), a 2012 musical about the Japanese American internment experience

== Other uses ==
- Allegiance (company), a voice of customer and enterprise feedback management technology platform

== See also ==
- Allegiant (disambiguation)
