= Jerry Crasnick =

American sportswriter

- Born: Portland, Maine, U.S.
- Education: Boston University
- Occupation: Sportswriter
- Employer: Major League Baseball Players Association (2019–present)

Jerry Crasnick is an American sportswriter. He is a senior advisor to the Major League Baseball Players Association and previously was a baseball writer for ESPN.com and Baseball America. Previously, he wrote for the Biddeford Journal Tribune, the Portland Press Herald, and The Cincinnati Post.

== Early life and education ==
Crasnick is from Munjoy Hill in Portland, Maine. He received his bachelor's degree in communications from Boston University.

== Career ==
Crasnick began his career working for the Journal Tribune in Biddeford, Maine, as well as the Portland Press Herald. In 1988, Crasnick was the beat writer for The Cincinnati Post, where he covered the Cincinnati Reds. During his time as beat writer, he covered Pete Rose and his suspension from Major League Baseball. Crasnick also covered the Reds' 1990 World Series championship, and five years of Marge Schott's tenure as owner of the Reds. He has worked for The Denver Post and Bloomberg News, while also writing for The Sporting News and Baseball America.

In addition to his website and newspaper work, Crasnick is the author of the book License to Deal: A Season on the Run with a Maverick Baseball Agent. The book's main focus is on the story of Matt Sosnick who left his job as a chief executive officer to become a baseball agent.

Crasnick covered baseball for ESPN. In addition to his numerous articles, Crasnick often moderated baseball-themed chats and was a guest on ESPN podcasts.

In 2019, the Major League Baseball Players Association hired Crasnick as a senior advisor for media relations.

== Personal life ==
Crasnick lives in Philadelphia, Pennsylvania with his wife and two daughters.
