= Roger Montgomery (sports agent) =

Roger Allen Montgomery (born August 26, 1970) is an American sports agent and former professional basketball player. He is the current CEO of Montgomery Sports Group. As a sports agent, Montgomery has represented basketball players in the National Basketball Association (NBA) and international leagues.

== Early life ==
Born in Chicago, Montgomery graduated in 1988 from Fairfax High School in Los Angeles. In 1988, Montgomery's senior year, Fairfax was the Los Angeles 4-A Division champion.

== College career ==
Montgomery first enrolled at Pratt Community College in Kansas. In 1991, he signed with Georgia Southern University but transferred to Life University, an NAIA school, the next season. Montgomery transferred because he was not included in the starting roster at Georgia Southern. At Life, Montgomery was an NAIA Academic All-American and graduated in 1994 with a Bachelor of Arts degree in business.

== Professional career ==
=== Basketball player ===
After graduating from Life University, Montgomery became operations assistant for the Houston Rockets basketball team. When a two-month lockout began in July 1995, Montgomery played professional basketball overseas briefly in Switzerland, France, Finland, and Poland for three seasons. In the 1997 1998 season, he played in Tapiolan Honka of the Finnish league Korisliiga. He ended his career with Noteć Inowrocław of the Polish Basketball League.

=== Sports agent ===
After his playing career ended, Montgomery co-founded Momentum Sports Management in San Antonio, Texas in 1999. At Momentum, Montgomery represented and trained Maurice Evans, who played college basketball at Wichita State and Texas before joining the NBA as an undrafted free agent. Explaining Momentum's approach, Montgomery told the San Antonio Express-News: "We focus on the transition from high school or college sports to the professional level." Momentum also represented Desmond Mason, the 17th pick in the first round of the 2000 NBA draft.

Montgomery founded his own agency, Montgomery Sports Group, in 2006. He represented another undrafted player who would eventually become an asset to a team, Jeremy Lin. Montgomery hoped that Lin would be a first-round draft pick, but Lin was not selected in the 2010 NBA draft. Lin entered the NBA as a free agent and was cut by two teams before the New York Knicks signed him, and Lin became one of the leading players with the Knicks.

=== Clients represented ===
- Rudy Gay
- Jeremy Lin
- PJ Washington
- Kevin Porter Jr.
- Zhaire Smith
- Willie Cauley-Stein
- Jeff Green
- Joey Graham
- Stephen Graham
- Jiří Welsch
- Dwayne Bacon
- Wilson Chandler
- Maurice Evans
- Langston Hall
- Kevin Kotzur
- Kirk Snyder
- Darnell Jackson
- Tyrus Thomas
- Patrick McCaw
- Kelvin Lewis
- Desmond Mason
- Sonny Weems
- John Ukomadu
- Jacky Cui
- Mark Armstrong
