= Susan A. Martinis =

American biochemist

Susan A. Martinis is an American biochemist. She has co-authored over 57 publications in peer reviewed journals and scientific book chapters. Her expertise is in protein:RNA interactions and aminoacyl tRNA synthetases. As of 2019, she is the Vice Chancellor for Research and Innovation at the University of Illinois at Urbana-Champaign.

== Scientific contributions ==
Martinis' research focuses on mechanisms, evolution, and biomedical applications of protein synthesis and RNA-protein interactions. In over 25 years of study on aminoacyl-tRNA synthetases, in particular leucyl-tRNA synthetase, Martinis has made significant contributions in understanding quality control mechanisms, tRNA recognition, and a non-canonical role in mitochondrial group I intron splicing. She has received research funding from the National Institutes of Health, National Science Foundation, W.M. Keck Foundation, the Human Frontier Science Program, The Robert A. Welch Foundation, and the American Chemical Society Petroleum Research Fund. She currently leads a W.M. Keck Foundation-supported team of six research laboratories at the University of Illinois to discover and characterize non-canonical activities of as many as twenty splice variants of mammalian leucyl-tRNA synthetases. This team includes researchers with expertise covering structural, and computational biology, as well as biochemistry. She was recently named interim vice chancellor for research designate at the University of Illinois.

== Personal history ==
Martinis was born in 1963 to Anne Irene Martinis, a school principal, and Paul Vincent Martinis, a commercial fisherman who came from a long line of fisherman from Yugoslavia. Martinis was raised in Everett, Washington with her two sisters, attended Catholic schools and played on school basketball teams. During her high school and college years she worked summers as the cook on her father's fishing boat off the coast of Alaska. Upon enrollment at Washington State University, she pledged Kappa Delta Sorority where she served as local chapter president. She received her Bachelor of Science degree from Washington State University in 1985.

In 1985, Martinis enrolled in graduate school at the University of Illinois in the Department of Biochemistry which was at that time in the School of Chemical Sciences. Stephen G. Sligar was her mentor and she received her Ph.D. in 1990. Martinis met her husband, Steven Blanke, in graduate school at the University of Illinois. They were married in Everett, Washington in 1992 and have three children.

Martinis was awarded an American Cancer Fellowship to perform postdoctoral research in the laboratory of Paul Schimmel at MIT. In 1992 she took a research position in the biotechnology industry at Cubist Pharmaceuticals, Inc., where she was awarded the first US patent and NIH SBIR grant for the company. In 1995 she moved back to academia, taking a position as an assistant professor at the University of Houston. After receiving teaching awards and tenure at the University of Houston, she was recruited to a tenure position at her alma mater, the University of Illinois. Martinis became head of the Department of Biochemistry and Medical Chemistry at the University of Illinois and has served as interim associate dean for the sciences in the College of Liberal Arts and Sciences, University of Illinois (2014–15) before being named interim Vice chancellor for Research at the University of Illinois at Urbana-Champaign in 2017. She was named Vice Chancellor for Research and Innovation in 2019.

== Education ==
- BS in chemistry, Washington State University, 1985
- PhD in biochemistry, University of Illinois, Urbana-Champaign, 1990

== Scientific positions ==
After completing her Ph.D., Martinis was a postdoctoral scientist at Massachusetts Institute of Technology in the laboratory of Professor Paul Schimmel (1990–92). She then went on to be one of the first research scientists hired at Cubist Pharmaceuticals, Inc., a biotechnology company founded by Schimmel and Julius Rebek. She worked there from 1993 to 1995 before returning to academic research, starting as a research assistant professor, Department of Biology and Biochemistry, University of Houston, 1996–1997. She was promoted to assistant professor, Department of Biology and Biochemistry, University of Houston in 1997 and associate professor, Department of Biology and Biochemistry, University of Houston in 2005. At that point she became an associate professor, Department of Biochemistry, University of Illinois and a full tenured professor in the Department of Biochemistry, University of Illinois in 2009. She also served as head, Departments of Biochemistry and Medical Chemistry, School of Molecular and Cellular Biology, University of Illinois from 2009-2013 and 2014-2018 serving as interim associate dean for the sciences in the College of Liberal Arts and Sciences, University of Illinois 2013. In 2015 she was named the Stephen G. Sligar Professor in the School of Molecular and Cellular Biology Professor and has joint positions in the Center for Biophysics and Computational Biology, School of Molecular and Cellular Biology, University of Illinois. In 2019, Martinis was named Vice Chancellor of Research and Innovation at the University of Illinois.

== Awards and honors ==
- Award for Teaching Excellence, School of Chemical Sciences, University of Illinois, 1988
- American Cancer Society Fellowship for Postdoctoral Research, 1990–92.
- Teaching Excellence Award, College of Natural Sciences and Mathematics, University of Houston, 2001.
- Houston Alumni Organization – Outstanding Faculty Award, 2001.
- Enron Award for Teaching Excellence, University of Houston, 2003.
- Distinguished Lecturer, Institute of Advanced Sciences, Hong Kong University of Science and Technology, 2015.
- Stephen A. Sligar Endowed Professorship, 2016-current.
- Speaker for the Sol Speigelman Memorial Symposium, 2017.

== Professional activities ==
- 2016- President-Elect, Association of Medical and Graduate Departments of Biochemistry Chairs
- 2015 National Institutes of Health, Special Emphasis Panel GGG-L(02)
- 2015–16 Board of Directors, Assoc. of Medical and Graduate Departments of Biochemistry
- 2012 National Science Foundation: Gene Expression Advisory Panel
- 2012 External Reviewer, Chair of Medical Biochemistry, College. of Medicine, UNC–Chapel Hill
- 2012–15 Education Committee, Association of Medical and Graduate Departments of Biochemistry Chairs
- 2011 External Reviewer, Department of Chemistry & Biochemistry, Brigham Young University
- 2007–12 Editorial Board, Journal of Biological Chemistry
- 2008-11 National Institutes of Health, Special Emphasis Panels
- 2009, 2011 Stage 2 Review Meeting: ZRG1 GGG-F (58); ZRG1 GGG-N (03)
- 2004-08 National Institutes of Health, Molecular Genetics A Study Section, permanent member.
- 2003 National Institutes of Health, Biochemistry Study Section, ad hoc reviewer
- 2003 Texas Advanced Research Program External Review, Life Sciences Panel, Austin, TX

== Representative publications ==
- Boniecki, M.T. and Martinis, S.A. (2012) Coordination of tRNA synthetase active sites for chemical fidelity. J. Biol. Chem., 287, 11285-11289.
- Sarkar, J., Poruri, K., Boniecki, M.T., McTavish, K.K., and Martinis, S.A. (2012) The yeast mitochondrial leucyl-tRNA synthetase CP1 domain has functionally diverged to accommodate RNA splicing at the expense of hydrolytic editing. J. Biol. Chem., 287, 14772-81.
- Palencia, A., Crepin, T., Vu, M.T., Lincecum Jr., T.L., Martinis, S.A., and Cusack, S. (2012) Structural dynamics of the aminoacylation and proofreading functional cycle of bacterial leucyl-tRNA synthetase., Nat. Struct. Mol. Biol, 1, doi:10.1038/nsmb.2317
- Li, L., Boniecki, M.T., Jaffe, J.D., Imai, B.S., Yau, P.M., Luthey-Schulten, Z., and Martinis, S.A. (2011) Naturally occurring aminoacyl-tRNA synthetases editing domain mutations that cause mistranslation in Mycoplasma parasites. Proc. Natl. Acad. Sci., USA, 108, 9378-9383.
- Sarkar, J., Mao, W., Lincecum, T.L. Jr., Alley, M.R.K., and Martinis, S.A. (2011) Characterization of Benzoxaborole-based Antifungal Resistance Mutations Demonstrates that Editing Depends on Electrostatic Stabilization of the Leucyl-tRNA Synthetase Editing Cap. FEBS Letts., 585, 2986-91.
- Sarkar, J. and Martinis, S.A. (2011) Amino Acid-Dependent Shift in tRNA Synthetase Editing Mechanisms. J. Am. Chem. Soc., 133, 18510-3.
- Nawaz, M.H. and Martinis, S.A. (2009) Chemistry of Aminoacyl-tRNA Synthetases. in Wiley Encyclopedia of Chemical Biology, Vol. 1 (Begley, T.P., Ed.), John Wiley & Sons, Hoboken, pp. 52– 63.
- Hellmann, R. A. and Martinis, S.A. (2009) Defects in Transient tRNA Translocation Bypass tRNA Synthetase Quality Control Mechanisms. J. Biol. Chem., 284: 11478-84.
- Boniecki, M.T., Tukalo, M., Hsu, J.L., Romero, E.P., and Martinis, S.A. (2009) Leucyl-tRNA Synthetase-Dependent and Independent Activation of the bI4 Group I Intron. J. Biol. Chem., 284, 26243- 50.
- Pang, Y.L.J. and Martinis, S.A. (2009) A Paradigm Shift for the Amino Acid Editing Mechanism of Human Cytoplasmic Leucyl-tRNA Synthetase. Biochemistry, 48, 8958-64. (highlighted on Biochemistry’s home page).
- Mascarenhas, A.P. and Martinis, S.A. (2009) A Glycine Hinge for tRNA-dependent Translocation of Editing Substrates to Prevent Errors by Leucyl-tRNA Synthetase. FEBS Letts., 583, 3443-7.
- Martinis, S.A. and Boniecki, M.T. (2009) The Balance Between Pre- and Post-Transfer Editing. FEBS Letts., 584, 455-9.
- Mascarenhas, A.P., Martinis, S.A., An, S., Rosen, A.E., Musier-Forsyth, K. (2008) Fidelity Mechanisms of the Aminoacyl-tRNA Synthetases, in Protein Engineering (RajBhandary, U.L. and Koehrer, C., Eds.) Springer Verlag, 153-200.
- Boniecki, M.T., Vu, M.T., Betha, A.K., and Martinis, S.A. (2008) CP1-Dependent Partitioning of Preand Post-transfer Editing in Leucyl-tRNA Synthetase. Proc. Natl. Acad. Sci. U.S.A., 105,19223-8.
