= Mike Champion (basketball) =

American basketball player (born 1964)

Personal information
- Born: April 5, 1964 (age 62) Everett, Washington, U.S.
- Listed height: 6 ft 10 in (2.08 m)
- Listed weight: 230 lb (104 kg)

Career information
- High school: Everett (Everett, Washington)
- College: Gonzaga (1983–1987)
- NBA draft: 1987: undrafted
- Position: Small forward
- Number: 41

Career history
- 1988–1989: Seattle SuperSonics
- Stats at NBA.com
- Stats at Basketball Reference

Mike O. Champion (born April 5, 1964) is an American professional basketball player. He was a 6'10", 230 lb. small forward and played for the NBA's Seattle SuperSonics during the 1988–89 season. Champion played college basketball for the Gonzaga Bulldogs from 1983 to 1987.

== Career statistics ==
Legend
GP	Games played	GS	Games started	MPG	Minutes per game
FG%	Field goal percentage	3P%	3-point field goal percentage	FT%	Free throw percentage
RPG	Rebounds per game	APG	Assists per game	SPG	Steals per game
BPG	Blocks per game	PPG	Points per game	**Bold**	Career high

=== NBA ===
==== Regular season ====
Year	Team	GP	GS	MPG	FG%	3P%	FT%	RPG	APG	SPG	BPG	PPG
1988–89	Seattle	2	0	2.0	.000	.000	–	1.0	.0	.0	.0	.0
