= William Gissberg =

American politician

William A. Gissberg
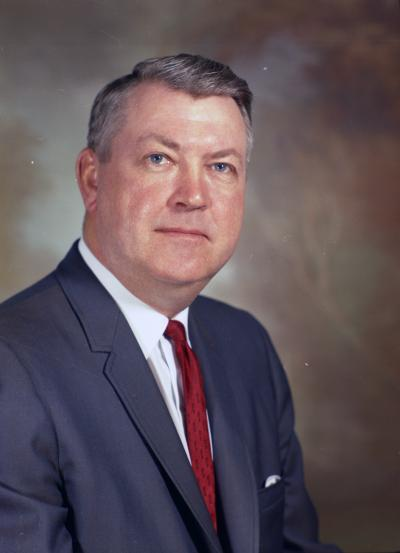
- Gissberg in 1967

Member of the Washington State Senate for the 39th district
- In office 1953–1973

Personal details
- Born: September 17, 1922 Everett, Washington, United States
- Died: December 30, 2002 (aged 80) Marysville, Washington, United States
- Party: Democratic

William Albert Gissberg (September 17, 1922 – December 30, 2002) was an American politician in the state of Washington. He served in the Washington State Senate from 1953 to 1973.
