= BeoBasket =

Serbian sports agency based in Belgrade

- Native name: БеоБаскет
- Company type: Privately held company
- Industry: Sport management
- Founded: 1995; 31 years ago in Belgrade, Yugoslavia
- Founder: Miško Ražnatović
- Headquarters: Belgrade, Serbia
- Areas served: Worldwide
- Key people: Miško Ražnatović (Chairman, CEO); Dragan Jankovski (Senior Vice-President)
- Services: Talent agent
- Owner: Miško Ražnatović
- Number of employees: 13 (2021)
- Website: beobasket.net

BeoBasket Ltd (Serbian Cyrillic: БеоБаскет д.о.о.) is a Serbian full-service sports agency based in Belgrade. It is founded by lawyer and former professional basketball player Miško Ražnatović.

The company has been recognized as the agency which holds record in number of players signed in EuroLeague, EuroCup and all top European national competitions, including the most important and highest paid deals in Europe. Additionally, in partnership with Excel Sports Management, they are a European agency with highest number of players in the National Basketball Association (NBA).

== History ==
In the 2017–18 EuroLeague season, BeoBasket represented 35 players, and they were the first-ranked agency. In the 2018–19 EuroLeague season, BeoBasket represented 43 players, and they were the first-ranked agency. In the 2019–20 EuroLeague season, BeoBasket represented 42 players, and they were again the first-ranked agency. In the 2020–21 EuroLeague season, BeoBasket represented 46 players, and they were again the first-ranked agency. In the 2021–22 EuroLeague season, BeoBasket represented total 52 players which was the new record and again, they were the first-ranked agency.

== Staff members ==
The following individuals are employed by the company:

- SRB Miško Ražnatović, chairman and CEO
- SRB Dragan Jankovski, Senior Vice-President and Director of Spanish and German basketball
- TUR Serhat Koymen, director of Turkish basketball
- NMK Slobodan Šljivančanin, director of Russian and Ukrainian basketball
- SRB Aleksandar Avlijaš, director of Polish and Romanian basketball
- BIHSLO Jasmin Hukić, director of Slovenian basketball
- GBR Мark Considine, director of Great Britain basketball

== Basketball players ==
=== Europe ===
BeoBasket represents or have represented the following active or retired athletes:

- İsmet Akpınar
- Dwayne Bacon
- Billy Baron
- Rodrigue Beaubois
- Will Clyburn
- Dejan Davidovac
- Brandon Davies
- Nihad Đedović
- Alpha Diallo
- Ognjen Dobrić
- Oscar da Silva
- Bryant Dunston
- Erten Gazi
- Niels Giffey
- Marko Gudurić
- Darrun Hilliard
- Kyle Hines
- Othello Hunter
- Nikola Ivanović
- Ognjen Jaramaz
- Livio Jean-Charles
- Paul Lacombe
- Joffrey Lauvergne
- Branko Lazić
- Vladimir Lučić
- Hassan Martin
- Vasilije Micić
- Josh Nebo
- Nemanja Nedović
- Landry Nnoko
- Andreas Obst
- Dylan Osetkowski
- Kendrick Perry
- Filip Petrušev
- Dyshawn Pierre
- Leon Radošević
- Augustine Rubit
- Marko Simonović
- Žan Mark Šiško
- Marial Shayok
- Markel Starks
- Johannes Thiemann
- Khyri Thomas
- Nikola Topić
- Aleksa Uskoković
- Jan Veselý
- Léo Westermann
- Scottie Wilbekin
- Aaron White
- Maik Zirbes
- Ante Žižić
- Paul Zipser

=== NBA ===
BeoBasket, in a partnership with U.S.-based sports agent Jeff A. Schwartz, represents or have represented the following active or retired athletes:

- BIH Džanan Musa
- BIH Mirza Teletović
- CRO Dario Šarić
- CRO Ivica Zubac
- CRO Ante Žižić
- CZE Jan Veselý
- FRA Joffrey Lauvergne
- FRA Adam Mokoka
- FRA Timothé Luwawu-Cabarrot
- GEO Goga Bitadze
- GER Paul Zipser
- GRE Vassilis Spanoulis
- MNE Omar Cook
- MNE Nikola Peković
- MNE Marko Simonović
- MEX Juan Toscano-Anderson
- MKD Pero Antić
- SRB Marko Gudurić
- SRB Nemanja Nedović
- SRB Nenad Krstić
- SRB Nikola Jokić
- SRB Nikola Jović
- SRB Boban Marjanović
- SLO Vlatko Čančar
- TUR Cedi Osman
- USA Jared Cunningham
- USA Brandon Davies
- USA Darrun Hilliard
- USA DeMarcus Nelson
- USA Khyri Thomas
- USA Deron Williams

== Basketball coaches ==
- TUR Ergin Ataman
- SRB Dušan Ivković
- SRB Dejan Milojević
- SRB Saša Obradović
- MNE Dejan Radonjić
- CRO Neven Spahija
- GRE Vassilis Spanoulis
