= Maurice Evans (basketball) =

American basketball player (born 1978)

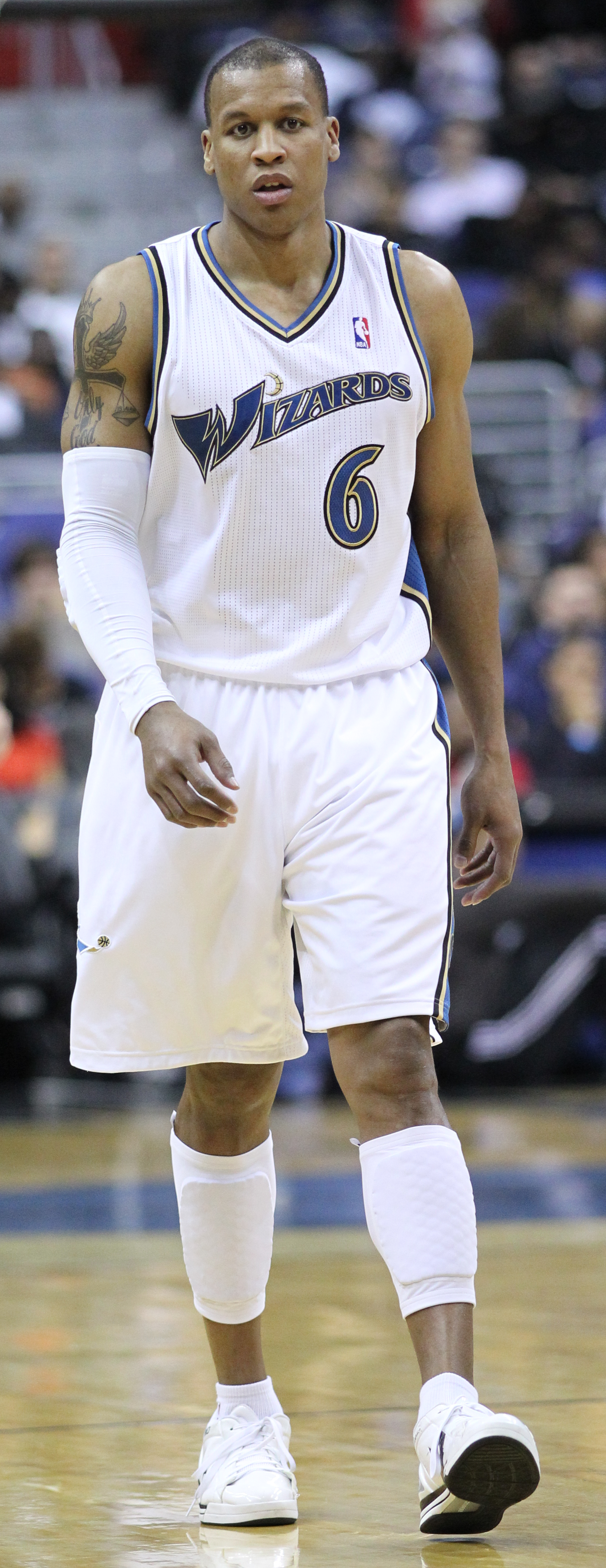
- Evans with the Washington Wizards in 2011

Personal information
- Born: November 8, 1978 (age 47) Wichita, Kansas, U.S.
- Listed height: 6 ft 5 in (1.96 m)
- Listed weight: 220 lb (100 kg)

Career information
- High school: Wichita Collegiate (Wichita, Kansas)
- College: Wichita State (1997–1999); Texas (2000–2001)
- NBA draft: 2001: undrafted
- Playing career: 2001–2012
- Position: Shooting guard / small forward
- Number: 1, 5, 6

Career history
- 2001–2002: Minnesota Timberwolves
- 2002–2003: Olympiacos
- 2003–2004: Benetton Treviso
- 2004–2005: Sacramento Kings
- 2005–2006: Detroit Pistons
- 2006–2007: Los Angeles Lakers
- 2007–2008: Orlando Magic
- 2008–2011: Atlanta Hawks
- 2011–2012: Washington Wizards

Career highlights
- Italian Cup winner (2004); Greek League All-Star (2003)
- Stats at NBA.com
- Stats at Basketball Reference

Maurice Eugene Evans (born November 8, 1978) is an American former professional basketball player who played in the National Basketball Association (NBA). He has served as a vice president of the NBA Players Association.

== College career ==
Known for his strong defense and athleticism, Evans played collegiately at Wichita State University for two seasons, but philosophical differences with then-coach Randy Smithson caused him to transfer to the University of Texas at Austin. Evans hired Roger Montgomery as an agent.

== Professional career ==
After not having been selected in the 2001 NBA draft, he signed as a free agent for the Minnesota Timberwolves, where he played in only 10 games. In 2002, he moved to Greece to play for Olympiacos, and in the following, 2003–04 season he played for the Italian power Benetton Basket Treviso (winning the Italian Cup). In 2004, he made the roster for the NBA's Sacramento Kings, and became a rotation player. He started 11 of 65 games, and played 19 minutes per game on the season, contributing 6.4 points. In 2005, he was signed as a free agent by the Detroit Pistons, where he was reunited with his former coach and close friend Flip Saunders, and played a rotation role of 14 minutes per game, averaging 5.2 points per game.

On June 28, 2006, the Pistons traded Evans to the Los Angeles Lakers for the draft rights to Cheikh Samb, following Evans' request to be moved to a team where he would be given more playing time. He served as a bench player for the Lakers, largely as the back up to Kobe Bryant.

On November 20, 2007, he along with teammate Brian Cook were traded to the Orlando Magic in exchange for Trevor Ariza. He became the Magic's starting shooting guard, contributing to the team's 52–30 record and landing the 3rd seed in the Eastern Conference for the 2008 Playoffs.

Evans agreed to terms on a 3-year contract from the Atlanta Hawks worth about $7.5 million on July 25, 2008. At the time, he was on the verge of signing a three-year deal with the Golden State Warriors. On May 7, 2009, Evans scored a postseason career-best 16 points during an Eastern Conference Semifinals Game 2 loss to the Cleveland Cavaliers. February 23, 2011, he was traded to the Washington Wizards.

Evans has since retired. Evans' final NBA game was on April 26, 2012 in a 104 - 70 win over the Miami Heat where he recorded 18 points and 1 assist.

In 2017, Evans joined the Killer 3's of the BIG3 basketball league, playing alongside coach/player Charles Oakley, Chauncey Billups, and Stephen Jackson, among others.

== NBA career statistics ==
Legend
GP	Games played	GS	Games started	MPG	Minutes per game
FG%	Field goal percentage	3P%	3-point field goal percentage	FT%	Free throw percentage
RPG	Rebounds per game	APG	Assists per game	SPG	Steals per game
BPG	Blocks per game	PPG	Points per game	**Bold**	Career high

=== Regular season ===
Year	Team	GP	GS	MPG	FG%	3P%	FT%	RPG	APG	SPG	BPG	PPG
2001–02	Minnesota	10	0	4.5	.474	.000	.750	.4	.4	.0	.0	2.1
2004–05	Sacramento	65	11	19.0	.442	.329	.756	**3.1**	.7	.6	.1	6.4
2005–06	Detroit	**80**	1	14.2	.452	.371	.800	2.0	.8	.5	.2	5.0
2006–07	L.A. Lakers	76	10	22.8	.432	.361	.787	2.9	1.0	.5	.2	8.4
2007–08	L.A. Lakers	7	0	13.7	.321	.143	.800	1.3	**1.7**	**.7**	.1	4.4
2007–08	Orlando	68	**47**	23.9	**.489**	**.396**	.691	**3.1**	1.0	.6	.1	9.3
2008–09	Atlanta	**80**	25	23.0	.432	.395	.822	3.0	.7	.6	.1	7.2
2009–10	Atlanta	79	5	16.7	.445	.337	.754	1.9	.6	.4	.2	5.7
2010–11	Atlanta	47	12	17.8	.393	.315	.857	1.8	.6	.3	.1	4.5
2010–11	Washington	26	12	**27.4**	.439	.346	**.933**	2.8	.6	**.7**	**.3**	**9.7**
2011–12	Washington	24	0	14.3	.402	.378	.769	1.0	.4	.6	.0	4.9
Career		562	123	19.4	.442	.363	.785	2.5	.7	.5	.2	6.7

=== Playoffs ===
Year	Team	GP	GS	MPG	FG%	3P%	FT%	RPG	APG	SPG	BPG	PPG
2005	Sacramento	3	0	18.7	**.600**	.500	.800	2.3	**1.0**	.7	.0	6.0
2006	Detroit	**16**	0	6.3	.533	**.636**	**.875**	.9	.2	.1	.1	3.3
2007	L.A. Lakers	5	0	16.4	.385	.385	.000	1.6	.6	.4	.0	5.0
2008	Orlando	10	**10**	**28.2**	.507	.417	.625	**2.5**	.7	**.8**	.1	**9.0**
2009	Atlanta	11	8	24.1	.431	.286	.667	1.5	.9	.5	**.3**	6.2
2010	Atlanta	11	0	13.5	.297	.300	.000	1.2	.2	**.8**	.0	2.3
Career		56	18	16.7	.447	.392	.771	1.5	.5	.5	.1	5.0
