= Don Van Patten =

American politician

Member of the New Hampshire House of Representatives from the Rockingham 8th district
- In office 2008–2009
- Preceded by: Joseph Guthrie
- Succeeded by: Kenneth Weyler

Personal details
- Born: February 19, 1966 (age 60) Spokane, Washington
- Party: Republican
- Children: Justin & Dylan
- Profession: Sales Management

Don Van Patten (born February 19, 1966, in Spokane, Washington) is a former American politician.

== Early life ==
Given up in a private adoption at birth, he continued to live in the Spokane area until his parents relocated the family to Everett, Washington, at the age of three. At Everett High School, he was active in football and track, graduating in 1984. During his high school years his political views were heavily shaped by the career of Everett High School alumnus Henry M. Jackson. After high school, Van Patten moved to Tempe, Arizona, living and working as a tile and marble setter until returning to Seattle to attend Seattle Pacific University for two years. After leaving SPU, he gained employment at Allied-Signal Aerospace and transferred to Arizona State University to complete his education.

== Professional career ==
He has worked as a quality, process and application engineer in the printed circuit board industry since the early 1990s. In 1997 he relocated his family to New Hampshire, on behalf of the former Continental Circuits Corporation, to assume responsibilities for the New England sales office. Mr. Van Patten served in sales management for Toppan Electronics where he was responsible for the Eastern portion of North America and Europe. Currently, Mr. Van Patten is in sales management at Merix Corporation.

== Political career ==
He was a Republican member of the New Hampshire House of Representatives, representing the Rockingham 8th District elected in 2008. Representative Van Patten was endorsed by the Republican Leadership Council and the New Hampshire Advantage Coalition for election to the New Hampshire General Court. He served as a member of the Science Technology and Energy committee. In addition to his role as a state legislator he also serves as an appointed member of the ad hoc Hampstead Wage & Salary Committee since 2006. In 2007, he was elected as a member of the Hampstead Budget Committee since 2007 for a three-year term. The Hampstead Budget Committee is an advisory committee that is chartered with protecting the taxpayers interest in regard to the Hampstead town and school budgets.

In the 2009 session Representative Van Patten was a cosponsor of HB428-FN to increase from $350,000 to $500,000 the amount of wine purchases off-premise retail license holders could purchase from the New Hampshire Liquor Commission at the maximum allowed discount. The bill was voted Inexpedient To Legislate 14-4 in the Local and Regulated Revenues Committee and killed on the floor by a voice vote.

Representative Van Patten challenged what he viewed as inaccurate representation of the voters of Hampstead by U.S. Senator Jeanne Shaheen and invited her to meet with the voters of Hampstead. Representative Van Patten cited two videos taken on the day in question and statement from the Hampstead town administration to the Eagle-Tribune that they did not see anyone who was prevented from meeting with the Senator's staff as the Senator asserted. Senator Shaheen did not provide a public comment in response to the letter published in the Carriage Town News or a direct response to Representative Van Patten.

Representative Van Patten was the original prime sponsor of HB1643 -FN, 2010 session, titled relative to requiring submission of a reduced spending alternative as part of the biennial budget process. This bill was designed to remove the legal requirement that state department heads provide bi-annual budgets that have zero or negative productivity growth through the maintenance budget process and to provide transparency to the budget process.

Representative Van Patten announced that he planned to provide real time updates on the vote counts house of the Science, Technology & Energy Committee and the NH House of Representatives via Twitter.

In addition to his legislative duties, he is a frequent contributor to The Advocates with Niel Young talk radio program Saturday mornings on WEZS 1350 AM based in Laconia, New Hampshire.

In October 2009, Representative Van Patten resigned from the New Hampshire General Court due to a change in his employer's ownership that affected his ability to represent his constituents. Representative Van Patten endorsed former General Court member Kenneth Weyler in the special election to fill his vacant seat.
