= Jon Smith (agent) =

Former English football agent

Jon Smith is an English former football agent.

== Career ==
Smith has represented Argentine international Diego Maradona as an agent.
