= Joe Urbon =

American sports agent

Joseph Curtis Urbon (born March 6, 1968) is an American sports agent and former professional baseball player. He is a Co-Head of Baseball at CAA Sports.

== Background ==
Urbon is a native of Seattle, Washington, and played baseball at Kentridge High School and Washington State University, where he was a pitcher and played the outfield from 1987 to 1989. He was drafted in 1989 by the Philadelphia Phillies, as an outfielder. While pursuing a career as a professional baseball player, Urbon completed his education, graduating cum laude from WSU in 1990 with a B.A. in English.

Urbon played minor league baseball for the Batavia Clippers (1987), Spartanburg Phillies (1988), Clearwater Phillies (1988–1989) and Reno Silver Sox (1989). Urbon tore the anterior cruciate ligament in his right knee while playing for the Silver Sox, which prematurely ended his playing career.

== Sports agent ==
Urbon is a Co-Head of CAA Sports’ Baseball division, along with Nez Balelo, Jeff Berry, Greg Landry, and Brodie Van Wagenen.

== Personal life ==
Urbon resides with his wife, Katherine, and three young children in Manhattan Beach, CA.
