= Legacy Sports Agency =

Legacy Sports Agency, formerly known as Allegiant Athletic Agency (a3), is an athletic agency that represents professional american football and basketball players, as well as coaches. Legacy is located in downtown Knoxville, Tennessee near the University of Tennessee. The agency rebranded from a3 in June 2024.

Legacy has represented high-level athletes in the NFL and the NBA, including Albert Haynesworth, Eric Berry, CJ Spiller, Michael Beasley, and Ramon Sessions. Recent clients include Anthony Richardson, Nakobe Dean, and Jaden Springer. The agency has negotiated what was at the time the largest contract for a defensive lineman in NFL history, the largest core special teams contract in NFL history, and the largest guaranteed contract in NFL history. Legacy has represented 10 Super Bowl champions and has negotiated over $1 billion in contracts since its inception.

Legacy's staff includes individuals with backgrounds in business, law, and athletics.
