= Matt Sosnick =

American sports agent

Matt Sosnick is a former San Francisco-based sports agent. He attended Burlingame High School and the University of Southern California. His business partners are Paul Cobbe and Adam Karon. Their client list includes, or included at one time, Major League Baseball All-Star and 2003 Rookie of the Year Dontrelle Willis; All-Stars Josh Johnson, Jay Bruce, and Matt Moore; Ricky Nolasco; Josh Hamilton; Freddy Sanchez; Josh Willingham; and Ryan Doumit.

His close relationship with star pitcher Dontrelle Willis helped his agency grow, as did being the subject of ESPN's Jerry Crasnick's book License to Deal. At an earlier point in his career, Willis got Sosnick's company logo tattooed onto his pitching arm as a sign of his loyalty to Sosnick Cobbe Sports.

In January 2013, Sosnick was inducted into the Jewish Sports Hall of Fame along with NBA coaches Herb and Larry Brown and sportswriter Art Spander.
