= 2008 Cleveland Indians season =

2008 Cleveland Indians
- League: American League
- Division: Central
- Ballpark: Progressive Field
- City: Cleveland, Ohio
- Owners: Larry Dolan
- General managers: Mark Shapiro
- Managers: Eric Wedge
- Television: SportsTime Ohio (Matt Underwood, Rick Manning, Al Pawlowski); WKYC (Jim Donovan, Rick Manning)
- Radio: WTAM · WMMS; Cleveland Indians Radio Network (Tom Hamilton, Jim Rosenhaus, Mike Hegan)

The 2008 Cleveland Indians season marked the 108th season for the franchise, as the Indians attempted to defend their American League Central title. The team played all of its home games at Progressive Field (formerly known as Jacobs Field).

2008 was the final year that the Indians held spring training in Winter Haven, Florida, at Chain of Lakes Park. In 2009 the Indians would return to train in Goodyear, Arizona for the first time in 15 years at the new Goodyear Ballpark.

The Indians approached the winter of 2007–08 with the idea that tinkering at the edges was what was primarily needed to build on the previous year. Acquired in the offseason were utility infielder Jamey Carroll, Japanese League reliever Masahide Kobayashi and reliever Jorge Julio.

== Regular season ==
=== Season summary ===
==== March ====
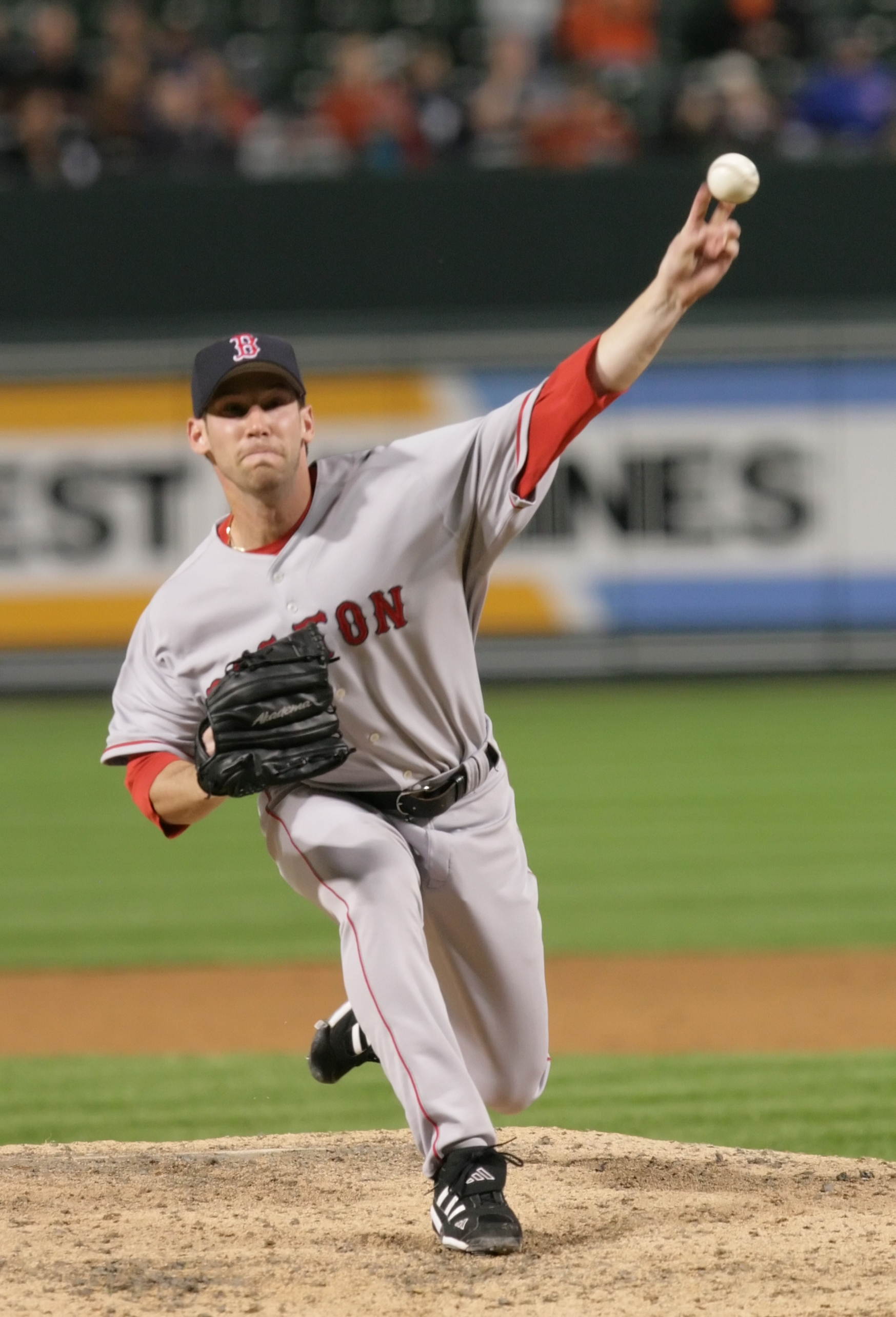
Craig Breslow

The Indians ended spring training in March with only one surprise, cutting veteran reliever Aaron Fultz in favor of pick up Craig Breslow (who was cut by the Boston Red Sox). Notable contributors from 2007 to start the year in Buffalo instead of Cleveland were Aaron Laffey, Ben Francisco, Josh Barfield, and Tom Mastny. The Indians opened the regular season with a 10–8 win over the Chicago White Sox.

==== April ====
The victory in the home opener came with a price: an injury to catcher Victor Martinez. While the offense played well enough to win the opening series, Martinez's missing bat did not help the Indians on their west coast road trip, where they lost series with both the Oakland Athletics and the Los Angeles Angels of Anaheim. Martinez returned to play for the Angels series. The Indians offense continued to struggle as the team failed to win their next four series. Near the end of the month, the Indians swept the Kansas City Royals split a four-game series against the New York Yankees and appeared to be coming out of their slump. Starting pitcher Cliff Lee was named American League Pitcher of the Month for April, as he finished the month 5–0 with a 0.96 ERA.

==== May ====
The sub par offense became such a concern that on May 5, in an attempt to spark more offense, Jason Michaels was designated for assignment and Ben Francisco, the 2007 International League batting champion was called up to play outfield. For the first half of the month, the starting pitching was outstanding, resulting in a 43 1/3 scoreless innings streak But the hitting still hadn't turned a corner and by the end of the month the Indians were still sub .500. Making his Indians debut was highly touted but often injured first baseman Michael Aubrey. The Indians swapped injured starting pitchers as Jake Westbrook came off the disabled list from an intercostal muscle injury just after Fausto Carmona went on it with a hip injury. And to end the month, Travis Hafner was also placed on the disabled list with shoulder soreness.

==== June ====
Westbrook's return was brief, returning to the disabled list with season ending Tommy John surgery. Victor Martinez also went on the disabled list with elbow problems. And Josh Barfield, called up to replace the slumping Asdrúbal Cabrera, also went on the disabled list. The Indians were one of the few AL clubs not to take great advantage of interleague play, going only 6–12 against the National League.

==== July ====
After plummeting to last place to start the month, the Indians threw in the towel on the season, trading CC Sabathia to the Milwaukee Brewers for outfielder Matt LaPorta, pitchers Rob Bryson and Zach Jackson and a player to be named later. They also parted ways with Joe Borowski, first designating him for assignment then releasing him. Although the Indians continued to struggle, pitcher Cliff Lee and center fielder Grady Sizemore were recognized for their individual accomplishments by being named to the American League All Star team. Lee was named the starting pitcher for the American League squad, where he pitched two shutout innings. Sizemore also participated in the Home Run Derby; he hit six home runs in the opening round, but it was not enough for him to advance to the second round. The Indians swept a series against the league leading Tampa Bay Rays right before the All-Star break, but continued their relatively uneven play, even with the return of Fausto Carmona in late July. Another victim of the Indians mediocre performance was Casey Blake, who was dealt to the Los Angeles Dodgers for Jon Meloan and baseball player Carlos Santana.

==== August ====
The Indians continued to struggle through the first week of August. On a road trip to start the month, the team began 2–4 before sweeping the Toronto Blue Jays at the Rogers Centre to finish the road trip 5–4 – the team's first winning road trip since May. The sweep of Toronto began a streak in which the Indians won 16 of 19 games, including 10 in a row to climb into third place in the division. The team clinched its first winning month of the season on August 24. Despite the turnaround, the Indians continued to trade players in order to add depth to their farm system. On August 12, they traded veteran pitcher Paul Byrd to the Boston Red Sox for a player to be named later. Again, one of the Indians bright spots was the play of Cliff Lee, who was named the American League Pitcher of the Month for August.

==== September ====
The Indians had a significant impact on the division championship this month, in as much as they both slowed the Minnesota Twins from catching the Chicago White Sox and then gave the Twins a chance to win the division outright by beating the Sox two games out of three in the final series. The Twins' losses to Kansas City at the same time, however, forced the White Sox to make up a game against the Detroit Tigers to help decide the division winner. Cliff Lee's spectacular season ended with him having the American League lead in wins and ERA. This effort earned Lee the American League Comeback Player of the Year award and the American League Cy Young Award. Shin-Soo Choo's great September numbers earned him the American League Player of the Month.

=== Season standings ===
AL Central
Team	W	L	Pct.	GB	Home	Road
Chicago White Sox	89	74	.546	—	54‍–‍28	35‍–‍46
Minnesota Twins	88	75	.540	1	53‍–‍28	35‍–‍47
Cleveland Indians	81	81	.500	7½	45‍–‍36	36‍–‍45
Kansas City Royals	75	87	.463	13½	38‍–‍43	37‍–‍44
Detroit Tigers	74	88	.457	14½	40‍–‍41	34‍–‍47

=== Game log ===
2008 Game Log
March/April: 13–15

#	Date	Opponent	Score	Win	Loss	Save	Attendance	Record
1	March 31	White Sox	10–8	Betancourt (1–0)	Dotel (0–1)	Borowski (1)	41,872	1–0
2	April 2	White Sox	7–2	Carmona (1–0)	Vázquez (0–1)		17,645	2–0
3	April 3	White Sox	2–1	Dotel (1–1)	Westbrook (0–1)	Jenks (1)	15,785	2–1
4	April 4	@ Athletics	6–3	Duchscherer (1–0)	Byrd (0–1)		13,916	2–2
5	April 5	@ Athletics	6–1	Eveland (1–0)	Sabathia (0–1)		16,279	2–3
6	April 6	@ Athletics	2–1	Lee (1–0)	Blanton (0–2)	Borowski (2)	16,384	3–3
7	April 7	@ Angels	6–4	Shields (1–0)	Borowski (0–1)		35,014	3–4
8	April 8	@ Angels	4–3	Westbrook (1–1)	Speier (0–1)		37,587	4–4
9	April 9	@ Angels	9–5	Moseley (1–1)	Byrd (0–2)		36,168	4–5
10	April 11	Athletics	9–7	Blanton (1–2)	Sabathia (0–2)	Street (3)	17,859	4–6
11	April 12	Athletics	7–3	DiNardo (1–0)	Carmona (1–1)		19,170	4–7
12	April 13	Athletics	7–1	Lee (2–0)	Gaudin (0–1)		17,228	5–7
13	April 14	Red Sox	6–4	Timlin (1–1)	Borowski (0–2)	Papelbon (5)	21,802	5–8
14	April 15	Red Sox	5–3	Aardsma (1–1)	Lewis (0–1)	Okajima (1)	25,135	5–9
15	April 16	Tigers	13–2	Galarraga (1–0)	Sabathia (0–3)		17,644	5–10
16	April 17	Tigers	11–1	Carmona (2–1)	Verlander (0–3)		21,547	6–10
17	April 18	@ Twins	4–0	Lee (3–0)	Liriano (0–2)		22,366	7–10
18	April 19	@ Twins	3–0	Blackburn (1–1)	Westbrook (1–2)	Nathan (6)	34,210	7–11
19	April 20	@ Twins	2–1 (10)	Guerrier (1–1)	Pérez (0–1)		27,703	7–12
20	April 22	@ Royals	15–1	Sabathia (1–3)	Meche (1–3)		16,165	8–12
–	April 23	@ Royals	Postponed (rain) Rescheduled for April 24					
21	April 24	@ Royals	9–6	Carmona (3–1)	Tomko (1–3)	Betancourt (1)	11,637	9–12
22	April 24	@ Royals	2–0	Lee (4–0)	Bannister (3–2)		11,637	10–12
23	April 25	Yankees	6–4	Byrd (1–2)	Pettitte (3–2)	Betancourt (2)	31,467	11–12
24	April 26	Yankees	4–3	Kobayashi (1–0)	Ohlendorf (0–1)		35,765	12–12
25	April 27	Yankees	1–0	Wang (5–0)	Sabathia (1–4)	Rivera (7)	31,598	12–13
26	April 28	Yankees	5–2	Mussina (3–3)	Laffey (0–1)	Rivera (8)	20,689	12–14
27	April 29	Mariners	7–2	Lowe (1–1)	Betancourt (1–1)		13,827	12–15
28	April 30	Mariners	8–3	Lee (5–0)	Washburn (1–4)		15,279	13–15

May: 12–15

#	Date	Opponent	Score	Win	Loss	Save	Attendance	Record
29	May 1	Mariners	3–2 (11)	Kobayashi (2–0)	Green (1–2)		15,722	14–15
–	May 2	Royals	Postponed (rain) Rescheduled for September 13					
30	May 3	Royals	4–2	Hochevar (2–1)	Sabathia (1–5)	Soria (7)	27,272	14–16
31	May 4	Royals	2–0	Meche (2–4)	Laffey (0–2)	Soria (8)	27,836	14–17
32	May 6	@ Yankees	5–3	Pérez (1–1)	Chamberlain (1–2)	Betancourt (3)	50,713	15–17
33	May 7	@ Yankees	3–0	Lee (6–0)	Wang (6–1)	Betancourt (4)	50,199	16–17
34	May 8	@ Yankees	6–3	Mussina (5–3)	Byrd (1–3)	Rivera (9)	53,227	16–18
35	May 9	Blue Jays	6–1	Sabathia (2–6)	Halladay (3–5)		26,472	17–18
36	May 10	Blue Jays	12–0	Laffey (1–2)	McGowan (2–3)		38,141	18–18
–	May 11	Blue Jays	Postponed (rain) Rescheduled for May 12					
37	May 12	Blue Jays	3–0	Carmona (4–1)	Burnett (3–4)		16,045	19–18
38	May 12	Blue Jays	3–0 (10)	Ryan (1–0)	Betancourt (1–2)	Downs (4)	16,045	19–19
39	May 13	Athletics	4–0	Byrd (2–3)	Duchscherer (3–2)	Kobayashi (1)	16,974	20–19
40	May 14	Athletics	2–0	Sabathia (3–6)	Blanton (2–6)		18,188	21–19
41	May 15	Athletics	4–2	Laffey (2–2)	Smith (2–3)	Kobayashi (2)	26,764	22–19
42	May 16	@ Reds	4–3	Weathers (1–2)	Lewis (0–2)	Cordero (8)	33,433	22–20
43	May 17	@ Reds	4–2	Bray (1–0)	Kobayashi (2–1)		42,023	22–21
44	May 18	@ Reds	6–4	Vólquez (7–1)	Lee (6–1)	Cordero (9)	34,612	22–22
45	May 20	@ White Sox	4–1	Contreras (5–3)	Sabathia (3–6)	Jenks (11)	27,533	22–23
46	May 21	@ White Sox	7–2	Vázquez (5–3)	Byrd (2–4)		38,518	22–24
47	May 22	@ White Sox	3–1	Linebrink (1–0)	Laffey (2–3)	Jenks (12)	28,040	22–25
48	May 23	Rangers	13–9	Loe (1–0)	Carmona (4–2)		39,947	22–26
49	May 24	Rangers	5–2	Lee (7–1)	Feldman (1–2)	Borowski (3)	40,504	23–26
50	May 25	Rangers	2–1 (10)	Wright (3–1)	Kobayashi (2–1)	Wilson (10)	35,464	23–27
51	May 26	White Sox	6–3 (12)	Logan (2–1)	Elarton (0–1)	Jenks (13)	30,006	23–28
52	May 27	White Sox	8–2	Laffey (3–3)	Buehrle (2–6)		25,426	24–28
53	May 28	White Sox	6–5	Floyd (5–3)	Betancourt (1–3)	Jenks (14)	31,740	24–29
54	May 30	@ Royals	5–4	Lee (8–1)	Tomko (2–7)	Borowski (4)	25,243	25–29
55	May 31	@ Royals	4–2	Davies (1–0)	Sabathia (3–7)	Soria (12)	23,923	25–30

June: 12–16

#	Date	Opponent	Score	Win	Loss	Save	Attendance	Record
56	June 1	@ Royals	6–1	Bannister (5–6)	Byrd (2–5)		22,345	25–31
57	June 2	@ Rangers	13–9	Kobayashi (3–2)	Guardado (0–1)		17,247	26–31
58	June 3	@ Rangers	12–7	Francisco (1–1)	Mastny (0–1)		16,373	26–32
59	June 4	@ Rangers	15–9	Lee (9–1)	Ramírez (0–1)		19,676	27–32
60	June 5	@ Rangers	9–4	Millwood (4–3)	Sabathia (3–8)		17,795	27–33
61	June 6	@ Tigers	4–2	Byrd (3–5)	Verlander (2–9)	Borowski (5)	40,990	28–33
62	June 7	@ Tigers	8–4	Miner (3–3)	Kobayashi (3–3)	Jones (9)	42,193	28–34
63	June 8	@ Tigers	5–2	Galarraga (5–2)	Sowers (0–1)	Jones (10)	39,941	28–35
64	June 9	@ Tigers	8–2	Lee (10–1)	Willis (0–1)		38,440	29–35
65	June 10	Twins	1–0	Sabathia (4–8)	Baker (2–1)		26,874	30–35
66	June 11	Twins	8–5	Blackburn (5–4)	Byrd (3–6)	Nathan (17)	18,742	30–36
67	June 12	Twins	12–2	Laffey (4–3)	Hernández (6–4)		21,716	31–36
68	June 13	Padres	9–5	Betancourt (2–3)	Meredith (0–2)	Kobayashi (3)	31,399	32–36
69	June 14	Padres	8–3 (10)	Bell (4–3)	Mujica (0–1)		37,484	32–37
70	June 15	Padres	7–3	Sabathia (5–8)	Maddux (3–5)		33,017	33–37
71	June 17	@ Rockies	10–2	Reynolds (2–4)	Byrd (3–7)		28,146	33–38
72	June 18	@ Rockies	4–2	Francis (3–6)	Laffey (4–4)	Fuentes (12)	28,339	33–39
73	June 19	@ Rockies	6–3	de la Rosa (2–3)	Sowers (0–2)	Fuentes (13)	33,174	33–40
74	June 20	@ Dodgers	6–4 (10)	Borowski (1–2)	Saito (3–3)	Kobayashi (4)	50,667	34–40
75	June 21	@ Dodgers	7–2 (11)	Kobayashi (4–3)	Wade (0–1)		45,036	35–40
76	June 22	@ Dodgers	4–3	Billingsley (6–7)	Byrd (3–8)	Saito (11)	39,993	35–41
77	June 24	Giants	3–2	Sánchez (7–4)	Betancourt (2–4)	Wilson (20)	29,024	35–42
78	June 25	Giants	4–1	Zito (3–11)	Sowers (0–3)	Wilson (21)	25,654	35–43
79	June 26	Giants	4–1	Lee (11–1)	Cain (4–6)	Borowski (6)	25,257	36–43
80	June 27	Reds	6–0	Sabathia (6–8)	Thompson (0–1)		34,844	37–43
81	June 28	Reds	5–0	Cueto (6–8)	Byrd (3–9)		39,506	37–44
82	June 29	Reds	9–5	Arroyo (5–7)	Laffey (4–5)		37,079	37–45
83	June 30	@ White Sox	9–7	Floyd (9–4)	Sowers (0–4)	Thornton (1)	38,466	37–46

July: 10–14

#	Date	Opponent	Score	Win	Loss	Save	Attendance	Record
84	July 1	@ White Sox	3–2 (10)	Russell (1–0)	Borowski (1–3)		25,502	37–47
85	July 2	@ White Sox	6–5 (10)	Russell (2–0)	Kobayashi (4–4)		23,522	37–48
86	July 4	@ Twins	12–3	Hernández (9–5)	Byrd (3–10)		22,634	37–49
87	July 5	@ Twins	9–6	Slowey (6–6)	Mastny (0–2)	Nathan (24)	31,887	37–50
88	July 6	@ Twins	4–3	Perkins (5–2)	Lee (11–2)	Nathan (25)	30,258	37–51
89	July 8	@ Tigers	9–2	Verlander (6–9)	Sowers (0–5)		40,443	37–52
90	July 9	@ Tigers	8–6	Jones (4–0)	Lewis (0–3)		41,062	37–53
91	July 10	Rays	13–2	Laffey (5–5)	Sonnanstine (10–4)		22,665	38–53
92	July 11	Rays	5–0	Lee (12–2)	Shields (7–6)		33,663	39–53
93	July 12	Rays	8–4	Ginter (1–0)	Garza (7–5)		35,706	40–53
94	July 13	Rays	5–2	Mastny (1–2)	Kazmir (7–5)	Kobayashi (5)	29,700	41–53
95	July 18	@ Mariners	8–2	Hernández (7–6)	Laffey (5–6)		42,570	41–54
96	July 19	@ Mariners	9–6	Sowers (1–5)	Batista (4–11)		37,869	42–54
97	July 20	@ Mariners	6–2	Lee (13–2)	Silva (4–12)		32,230	43–54
98	July 21	@ Angels	5–2	Byrd (4–10)	Santana (11–4)	Kobayashi (6)	43,037	44–54
99	July 22	@ Angels	3–2	Oliver (4–1)	Ginter (1–1)	Rodríguez (41)	43,505	44–55
100	July 23	@ Angels	14–11	Lackey (8–2)	Laffey (5–7)	Rodríguez (42)	42,187	44–56
101	July 25	Twins	5–4	Lee (14–2)	Hernández (10–7)	Perez (1)	33,512	45–56
102	July 26	Twins	11–4	Baker (7–3)	Carmona (4–3)		35,390	45–57
103	July 27	Twins	4–2	Guerrier (6–4)	Perez (1–2)	Nathan (28)	31,562	45–58
104	July 28	Tigers	5–0	Byrd (5–10)	Rogers (8–7)		24,689	46–58
105	July 29	Tigers	8–5	Galarraga (9–4)	Ginter (1–2)		30,625	46–59
106	July 30	Tigers	14–12 (13)	Fossum (2–0)	Rincón (0–1)		26,596	46–60
107	July 31	Tigers	9–4	Carmona (5–3)	Verlander (8–11)		34,186	47–60

August: 18–10

#	Date	Opponent	Score	Win	Loss	Save	Attendance	Record
108	August 1	@ Twins	4–1	Blackburn (8–6)	Sowers (1–6)	Nathan (30)	33,709	47–61
109	August 2	@ Twins	5–1	Byrd (6–10)	Slowey (7–8)		40,937	48–61
110	August 3	@ Twins	6–2	Liriano (1–3)	Ginter (1–3)		39,618	48–62
111	August 4	@ Rays	5–2	Lee (15–2)	Garza (9–7)	Perez (2)	17,049	49–62
112	August 5	@ Rays	8–4	Jackson (8–7)	Carmona (5–4)		20,063	49–63
113	August 6	@ Rays	10–7	Percival (2–0)	Kobayashi (4–5)		27,533	49–64
114	August 8	@ Blue Jays	5–2	Reyes (1–0)	Purcey (1–3)	Lewis (1)	31,627	50–64
115	August 9	@ Blue Jays	4–2	Byrd (7–10)	Halladay (13–9)		39,623	51–64
116	August 10	@ Blue Jays	4–0	Lee (16–2)	Richmond (0–2)		36,447	52–64
117	August 11	Orioles	13–8	Mujica (1–1)	Cherry (0–1)		23,408	53–64
118	August 12	Orioles	7–5	Perez (2–2)	Johnson (2–4)	Lewis (2)	21,143	54–64
119	August 13	Orioles	6–1	Guthrie (10–8)	Reyes (1–1)		21,299	54–65
120	August 14	Orioles	11–6	Cabrera (1–1)	Perez (2–3)		22,140	54–66
121	August 15	Angels	3–2	Lee (17–2)	Arredondo (4–1)		30,962	55–66
122	August 16	Angels	4–3	Lackey (10–2)	Carmona (5–5)	Rodríguez (47)	33,051	55–67
123	August 17	Angels	4–3	Sowers (2–6)	Speier (1–6)	Lewis (3)	28,356	56–67
124	August 19	Royals	9–4	Reyes (2–1)	Hochevar (6–12)		18,946	57–67
125	August 20	Royals	8–5	Rincón (1–1)	Soria (1–3)	Lewis (4)	23,920	58–67
126	August 21	Royals	10–3	Lee (18–2)	Greinke (9–9)		21,391	59–67
127	August 22	@ Rangers	7–5	Carmona (6–5)	Harrison (5–3)	Lewis (5)	20,535	60–67
128	August 23	@ Rangers	8–7	Perez (3–3)	Wright (6–5)	Lewis (6)	29,900	61–67
129	August 24	@ Rangers	4–3	Betancourt (3–4)	Guardado (3–3)		14,956	62–67
130	August 25	@ Tigers	4–3 (10)	Donnelly (1–0)	Glover (1–3)	Lewis (7)	39,196	63–67
131	August 26	@ Tigers	10–4	Lee (19–2)	Lambert (0–1)		38,774	64–67
132	August 27	@ Tigers	9–7	Carmona (7–5)	Verlander (10–14)		38,519	65–67
133	August 29	Mariners	3–2	Hernández (9–8)	Sowers (2–7)	Putz (10)	26,047	65–68
134	August 30	Mariners	4–3 (10)	Putz (6–4)	Lewis (0–4)	Messenger (1)	33,387	65–69
135	August 31	Mariners	6–4	Rowland-Smith (4–2)	Jackson (0–1)	Corcoran (2)	35,376	65–70

September: 16–11

#	Date	Opponent	Score	Win	Loss	Save	Attendance	Record
136	September 1	White Sox	5–0	Lee (20–2)	Richard (2–3)		23,317	66–70
137	September 2	White Sox	9–3	Carmona (8–5)	Danks (10–8)		20,980	67–70
138	September 3	White Sox	4–2	Vázquez (11–12)	Sowers (2–8)	Jenks (28)	20,328	67–71
139	September 5	@ Royals	9–3	Mujica (2–1)	Duckworth (2–1)		21,107	68–71
140	September 6	@ Royals	3–1	Meche (11–10)	Jackson (0–2)	Soria (35)	18,795	68–72
141	September 7	@ Royals	3–1	Lee (21–2)	Greinke (10–10)	Lewis (8)	15,023	69–72
142	September 8	@ Orioles	14–3	Olson (9–7)	Carmona (8–6)		11,181	69–73
143	September 9	@ Orioles	6–1	Sowers (3–8)	Liz (5–5)		14,900	70–73
144	September 10	@ Orioles	7–1	Lewis (1–0)	Waters (2–3)		12,438	71–73
145	September 11	@ Orioles	6–3	Cormier (3–3)	Jackson (0–3)	Miller (1)	12,526	71–74
146	September 12	Royals	12–5	Lee (22–2)	Meche (11–11)		32,843	72–74
147	September 13	Royals	8–3	Greinke (11–10)	Carmona (8–7)		25,783	72–75
148	September 13	Royals	8–4	Tejeda (2–2)	Bullington (0–1)	Soria (37)	25,485	72–76
149	September 14	Royals	13–3	Bannister (8–15)	Mujica (2–2)		29,530	72–77
150	September 15	Twins	3–1	Lewis (2–0)	Slowey (12–10)	Lewis (9)	19,607	73–77
151	September 16	Twins	12–9 (11)	Mastny (2–2)	Nathan (0–2)		21,295	74–77
152	September 17	Twins	6–4	Mujica (3–2)	Mijares (0–1)	Lewis (10)	22,904	75–77
153	September 19	Tigers	6–5	Perez (4–3)	Dolsi (1–5)		33,733	76–77
154	September 20	Tigers	6–3	Sowers (4–8)	Verlander (10–17)	Lewis (11)	36,869	77–77
155	September 21	Tigers	10–5	Lewis (3–0)	Willis (0–2)		36,957	78–77
156	September 22	@ Red Sox	4–3	Jackson (1–3)	Beckett (12–10)	Lewis (12)	37,828	79–77
157	September 23	@ Red Sox	5–4	Wakefield (10–11)	Lee (22–3)	Papelbon (41)	37,882	79–78
158	September 24	@ Red Sox	5–4	Aardsma (4–2)	Perez (4–4)	Delcarmen (2)	37,719	79–79
159	September 25	@ Red Sox	6–1	Lester (16–6)	Sowers (4–9)		37,726	79–80
160	September 26	@ White Sox	11–8	Lewis (4–0)	Danks (11–9)	Lewis (13)	36,494	80–80
161	September 27	@ White Sox	12–6	Jackson (2–3)	Vázquez (12–16)		36,031	81–80
162	September 28	@ White Sox	5–1	Buehrle (15–12)	Bullington (0–2)		33,396	81–81

=== Roster ===
2008 Cleveland Indians
Roster
Pitchers: 27 Rick Bauer; 63 Rafael Betancourt; 47 Joe Borowski; 58 Craig Breslow; 26 Bryan Bullington; 36 Paul Byrd; 55 Fausto Carmona; 58 Brendan Donnelly; 39 Scott Elarton; 56 Matt Ginter; 57 Zach Jackson; 30 Masahide Kobayashi; 32 Aaron Laffey; 31 Cliff Lee; 50 Jensen Lewis; 46 Scott Lewis; 40 Tom Mastny; 59 Jonathan Meloan; 49 Edward Mujica; 53 Rafael Pérez; 27 Anthony Reyes; 34 Juan Rincón; 56 Rich Rundles; 52 CC Sabathia; 54 Brian Slocum; 45 Jeremy Sowers; 37 Jake Westbrook	Catchers: 44 Sal Fasano; 41 Víctor Martínez; 10 Kelly Shoppach; Infielders: 68,23 Michael Aubrey; 29 Josh Barfield; 1 Casey Blake; 13 Asdrúbal Cabrera; 7 Jamey Carroll; 25 Ryan Garko; 50 Andy González; 15 Andy Marte; 2 Jhonny Peralta; 11 Jorge Velandia	Outfielders: 17 Shin-Soo Choo; 20 David Dellucci; 12 Ben Francisco; 38 Franklin Gutiérrez; 8 Jason Michaels; 24 Grady Sizemore; 16 Jason Tyner; Other batters: 48 Travis Hafner	Manager: 22 Eric Wedge; Coaches: 29 Jeff Datz (third base); 4 Luis Isaac (bullpen); 6 Luis Rivera (first base/infield); 39 Derek Shelton (hitting); 35 Joel Skinner (bench); 51 Carl Willis (pitching)

== Player stats ==
=== Batting ===
Note: G = Games played; AB = At bats; R = Runs scored; H = Hits; 2B = Doubles; 3B = Triples; HR = Home runs; RBI = Runs batted in; AVG = Batting average; SB = Stolen bases

Player	G	AB	R	H	2B	3B	HR	RBI	AVG	SB
Michael Aubrey	15	45	2	9	0	0	2	3	.200	0
Josh Barfield	12	33	3	6	1	0	0	2	.182	0
Rick Bauer	1	0	0	0	0	0	0	0	.000	0
Rafael Betancourt	3	0	0	0	0	0	0	0	.000	0
Casey Blake	94	325	46	94	24	0	11	58	.289	2
Joe Borowski	2	0	0	0	0	0	0	0	.000	0
Paul Byrd	2	5	0	0	0	0	0	0	.000	0
Asdrúbal Cabrera	114	352	48	91	20	0	6	47	.259	4
Fausto Carmona	1	3	0	0	0	0	0	0	.000	0
Jamey Carroll	113	347	60	96	13	4	1	36	.277	7
Shin-Soo Choo	94	317	68	98	28	3	14	66	.309	4
David Dellucci	113	336	41	80	19	2	11	47	.238	3
Scott Elarton	2	0	0	0	0	0	0	0	.000	0
Sal Fasano	15	46	5	12	4	0	0	6	.261	0
Ben Francisco	121	447	65	119	32	0	15	54	.266	4
Ryan Garko	141	495	61	135	21	1	14	90	.273	0
Andy González	10	24	3	5	0	0	1	2	.208	0
Franklin Gutierrez	134	399	54	99	26	2	8	41	.248	9
Travis Hafner	57	198	21	39	10	0	5	24	.197	1
Jorge Julio	2	0	0	0	0	0	0	0	.000	0
Masahide Kobayashi	4	0	0	0	0	0	0	0	.000	0
Aaron Laffey	1	2	0	1	0	0	0	0	.500	0
Cliff Lee	2	5	0	0	0	0	0	0	.000	0
Jensen Lewis	2	0	0	0	0	0	0	0	.000	0
Andy Marte	80	235	21	52	11	1	3	17	.221	1
Víctor Martínez	73	266	30	74	17	0	2	35	.278	0
Jason Michaels	21	58	3	12	4	0	0	9	.207	1
Jhonny Peralta	154	605	104	167	42	4	23	89	.276	3
Rafael Perez	6	0	0	0	0	0	0	0	.000	0
CC Sabathia	1	3	1	1	0	0	1	1	.333	0
Kelly Shoppach	112	352	67	92	27	0	21	55	.261	0
Grady Sizemore	157	634	101	170	39	5	33	90	.268	38
Jeremy Sowers	2	1	0	0	0	0	0	0	.000	0
Jason Tyner	1	2	0	0	0	0	0	0	.000	0
Jorge Velandia	10	15	1	3	1	0	0	0	.200	0
Team totals	162	5543	805	1455	339	22	171	772	.262	77

=== Pitching ===
Note: W = Wins; L = Losses; ERA = Earned run average; G = Games pitched; GS = Games started; SV = Saves; IP = Innings pitched; H = Hits allowed; R = Runs allowed; ER = Earned runs allowed; BB = Walks allowed; K = Strikeouts

Player	W	L	ERA	G	GS	SV	IP	H	R	ER	BB	K
Rick Bauer	0	0	13.50	4	0	0	6.0	10	9	9	3	4
Rafael Betancourt	3	4	5.07	69	0	4	71.0	76	41	40	25	64
Joe Borowski	1	3	7.56	18	0	6	16.2	24	14	14	8	9
Craig Breslow	0	0	3.24	7	0	0	8.1	10	3	3	5	7
Paul Byrd	7	10	4.53	22	22	0	131.0	146	70	66	24	56
Bryan Bullington	0	2	4.91	3	2	0	14.2	15	9	8	2	12
Fausto Carmona	8	7	5.44	22	22	0	120.2	126	80	73	70	58
Brendan Donnelly	1	0	8.56	15	0	0	13.2	20	13	13	10	8
Scott Elarton	0	1	3.52	8	0	0	15.1	16	7	6	9	15
Matt Ginter	1	3	5.14	4	4	0	21.0	25	12	12	3	12
Zach Jackson	2	3	5.60	9	9	0	54.2	64	36	34	14	30
Jorge Julio	0	0	5.60	15	0	0	17.2	18	11	11	11	15
Masahide Kobayashi	4	5	4.53	57	0	6	55.2	65	30	28	14	35
Aaron Laffey	5	7	4.23	16	16	0	93.2	103	52	44	31	43
Cliff Lee	22	3	2.54	31	31	0	223.1	214	68	63	34	170
Jensen Lewis	0	4	3.82	51	0	13	66.0	68	29	28	27	52
Scott Lewis	4	0	2.63	4	4	0	24.0	20	9	7	6	15
Tom Mastny	2	2	10.80	14	1	0	20.0	28	24	24	11	19
John Meloan	0	0	0.00	2	0	0	2.0	0	0	0	1	2
Edward Mujica	3	2	6.75	33	0	0	38.2	46	29	29	10	27
Rafael Perez	4	4	3.54	73	0	2	76.1	67	32	30	23	86
Anthony Reyes	2	1	1.83	6	6	0	34.1	31	7	7	12	15
Juan Rincón	1	1	5.60	23	0	0	27.1	34	18	17	8	19
Rich Rundles	0	0	1.80	8	0	0	5.0	5	1	1	3	6
CC Sabathia	6	8	3.83	18	18	0	122.1	117	54	52	34	123
Brian Slocum	0	0	27.00	2	0	0	2.0	8	6	6	0	1
Jeremy Sowers	4	9	5.58	22	22	0	121.0	141	84	75	39	64
Jake Westbrook	1	2	3.12	5	5	0	34.2	33	13	12	7	19
Team totals	81	81	4.45	162	162	31	1437.0	1530	761	711	444	986

== Minor league affiliates ==
Classification level	Team	League	Season article
AAA	Buffalo Bisons	International League	2008 Buffalo Bisons season
AA	Akron Aeros	Eastern League	2008 Akron Aeros season
Advanced A	Kinston Indians	Carolina League	
A	Lake County Captains	South Atlantic League	
Short Season A	Mahoning Valley Scrappers	New York–Penn League	
Rookie	Gulf Coast Indians	Gulf Coast League	
Rookie	DSL Indians	Dominican Summer League	
