= 2007 American League Championship Series =

38th edition of Major League Baseball's American League Championship Series

Team (Wins)	Managers	Season
Boston Red Sox (4)	Terry Francona	96–66 (.593), GA: 2
Cleveland Indians (3)	Eric Wedge	96–66 (.593), GA: 8
- Dates: October 12–21
- MVP: Josh Beckett (Boston)
- Umpires: Randy Marsh, Kerwin Danley, Brian Gorman, Paul Emmel, Gary Cederstrom, Dana DeMuth

Broadcast
- Television: Fox (United States); MLB International (International)
- TV announcers: Joe Buck, Tim McCarver, and Ken Rosenthal (Fox); Dave O'Brien and Rick Sutcliffe (MLB International)
- Radio: ESPN
- Radio announcers: Jon Miller and Joe Morgan
- ALDS: Boston Red Sox over Los Angeles Angels of Anaheim (3–0); Cleveland Indians over New York Yankees (3–1)

The 2007 American League Championship Series (ALCS) was the best-of-seven playoff series that pitted the overall #1 seed Boston Red Sox against the second-seeded Cleveland Indians for the American League pennant. The Red Sox held home-field advantage throughout the playoffs by winning the season series against Cleveland, five games to two, although both teams finished with 96–66 records. The Red Sox came back from a 3–1 series deficit to defeat the Indians 4–3, outscoring them 30–5 over the final three games of the Series.

The series marks the fourth postseason meeting of the two teams, following the 1995 and 1998 AL Division Series, both of which were won by the Indians, and the 1999 ALDS, won by the Red Sox (in a similar fashion to this series). It was the eighth ALCS appearance for Boston, and the fourth for Cleveland.

The Red Sox would go on to sweep the Colorado Rockies in the World Series, winning their seventh World Series championship, and second in four years.

The series was broadcast on Fox television.

== Summary ==
=== Boston Red Sox vs. Cleveland Indians ===
Boston won the series, 4–3.

Game	Date	Score	Location	Time	Attendance
1	October 12	Cleveland Indians – 3, Boston Red Sox – 10	Fenway Park	3:35	36,986
2	October 13	Cleveland Indians – 13, Boston Red Sox – 6 (11)	Fenway Park	5:14	37,051
3	October 15	Boston Red Sox – 2, Cleveland Indians – 4	Jacobs Field	3:28	44,402
4	October 16	Boston Red Sox – 3, Cleveland Indians – 7	Jacobs Field	3:12	44,008
5	October 18	Boston Red Sox – 7, Cleveland Indians – 1	Jacobs Field	3:46	44,588
6	October 20	Cleveland Indians – 2, Boston Red Sox – 12	Fenway Park	3:09	37,163
7	October 21	Cleveland Indians – 2, Boston Red Sox – 11	Fenway Park	3:33	37,165

== Game summaries ==
=== Game 1 ===
October 12, 2007 7:11 pm (EDT) at Fenway Park in Boston, Massachusetts 53 °F (12 °C), clear
Team	1	2	3	4	5	6	7	8	9	R	H	E
Cleveland	1	0	0	0	0	1	0	1	0	3	8	0
Boston	1	0	4	0	3	2	0	0	X	10	12	0
WP: Josh Beckett (1–0) LP: CC Sabathia (0–1); Home runs: CLE: Travis Hafner (1); BOS: None; Attendance: 36,986; Boxscore

In Game 1, the Cleveland Indians took the lead when Travis Hafner hit a home run to deep right field in the first inning against Josh Beckett, who retired the next ten batters in a row, finishing by striking out seven while allowing only two runs in six innings pitched. The Red Sox tied the game in the bottom of the inning off CC Sabathia on three straight one-out singles by Kevin Youkilis, David Ortiz, and Manny Ramirez. In the third, the Red Sox loaded the bases with one out on a double, walk, and hit by pitch before Ramirez walked to force in a run, then Mike Lowell's ground-rule double scored two more. After Bobby Kielty was intentionally walked, Jason Varitek's groundout put Boston up 5–1. In the fifth, the Red Sox again loaded the bases on a single and two walks when Kielty's single scored two with Lowell being tagged out at third. Jensen Lewis relieved Sabathia and allowed an RBI double to Varitek. Sabathia was charged with eight runs on seven hits in 4 1/3 innings. Casey Blake doubled to lead off the top of the sixth and scored on Asdrúbal Cabrera's single one out later. Dustin Pedroia and Youkilis hit back-to-back singles to lead off the bottom of the sixth. Aaron Fultz relieved Lewis and walked two to load the bases and force in a run. Tom Mastny relieved Fultz and allowed a sacrifice fly to Lowell to put the Red Sox up 10–2. The Indians scored their last run in the top of the eighth off Javier López when Blake hit a leadoff double, moved to third on a fly out, and scored on Cabrera's sacrifice fly. They loaded the bases with two outs off Éric Gagné in the ninth, but Grady Sizemore struck out on a full count to end the game as the Red Sox went up 1–0 in the series.

=== Game 2 ===
October 13, 2007 8:23 pm (EDT) at Fenway Park in Boston, Massachusetts 56 °F (13 °C), mostly clear
Team	1	2	3	4	5	6	7	8	9	10	11	R	H	E
Cleveland	1	0	0	3	1	1	0	0	0	0	7	13	17	0
Boston	0	0	3	0	3	0	0	0	0	0	0	6	10	0
WP: Tom Mastny (1–0) LP: Éric Gagné (0–1); Home runs: CLE: Jhonny Peralta (1), Grady Sizemore (1), Franklin Gutiérrez (1); BOS: Manny Ramírez (1), Mike Lowell (1); Attendance: 37,051; Boxscore

Game 2 was billed as a matchup of aces in 19-game winner Fausto Carmona and veteran postseason ace Curt Schilling. However, both starters were out by the fifth as both offenses took charge in what evolved into an 11-inning, run-scoring saga that clocked in at 5 hours and 14 minutes. After the Indians took the lead in the first on a Victor Martinez RBI double after a leadoff double by Grady Sizemore, the Red Sox loaded the bases in the third on two singles and a walk before a Manny Ramírez walk tied the game, then Mike Lowell's two-run single put them up 3–1. In the top of the fourth, Jhonny Peralta hit a three-run blast into the camera well in center field off Schilling, giving the Indians a 4–3 lead. Sizemore's home run next inning made it 5–3 Indians. In the bottom of the inning, Manny Ramirez hit an opposite-field two-run home run to tie the game followed by a go-ahead Mike Lowell home run over the Green Monster, both off Indians reliever Rafael Pérez. In the top of the sixth, Peralta drew a leadoff walk off reliever Manny Delcarmen, moved to third on a single and scored on Franklin Gutierrez's groundout to tie the game 6–6. Each team's bullpen put up scoreless frames after the sixth inning, leading to extra innings. The 11th inning proved to be a historic one as Cleveland took advantage by scoring seven runs off a shaky Sox bullpen, a postseason record for runs in an extra inning by one team (along with just being the fifth time in history along with the first in a decade). One of the highlights was the go-ahead RBI base hit by former Red Sox right fielder Trot Nixon off Boston's lefty specialist Javier López after a one-out and single off Eric Gagne. What made the base hit significant was that Nixon has historically struggled against left-handed pitching, but manager Eric Wedge left Nixon in to hit against López, and the move paid off. A wild pitch allowed another run to score. After retiring Víctor Martínez, López gave up a single to Ryan Garko and was lifted for Jon Lester, the only pitcher left in the Boston bullpen. Lester did not fare much better; Peralta greeted him with a run-scoring double, which was followed one out later by Franklin Gutiérrez's three-run homer, capping the scoring. Indians reliever Tom Mastny got the win and Joe Borowski retired the Red Sox in the bottom of the inning, and the Indians took Game 2 by a score of 13–6, tying the series heading to Cleveland.

=== Game 3 ===
October 15, 2007 7:10 pm (EDT) at Jacobs Field in Cleveland, Ohio 69 °F (21 °C), mostly cloudy
Team	1	2	3	4	5	6	7	8	9	R	H	E
Boston	0	0	0	0	0	0	2	0	0	2	7	0
Cleveland	0	2	0	0	2	0	0	0	X	4	6	1
WP: Jake Westbrook (1–0) LP: Daisuke Matsuzaka (0–1) Sv: Joe Borowski (1); Home runs: BOS: Jason Varitek (1); CLE: Kenny Lofton (1); Attendance: 44,402; Boxscore

Coming off a lopsided 13–6 loss in 11 innings, Boston sent Daisuke Matsuzaka to the mound to face off with Jake Westbrook for Game 3 at Jacobs Field. Kenny Lofton's two-run home run gave the Indians a 2–0 lead in the second inning. Dice-K would be knocked out after allowing RBI singles to Asdrúbal Cabrera and Travis Hafner to make it 4–0 in the fifth inning. Jason Varitek's two-run home run in the seventh inning off Westbrook cut the lead to 4–2, but the Sox could get no closer as Cleveland's closer Joe Borowski, who led the AL in saves during the regular season, once again shut the door on the Sox, giving the Indians a 2–1 lead in the series.

=== Game 4 ===
October 16, 2007 8:22 pm (EDT) at Jacobs Field in Cleveland, Ohio 66 °F (19 °C), overcast
Team	1	2	3	4	5	6	7	8	9	R	H	E
Boston	0	0	0	0	0	3	0	0	0	3	8	1
Cleveland	0	0	0	0	7	0	0	0	X	7	9	0
WP: Paul Byrd (1–0) LP: Tim Wakefield (0–1); Home runs: BOS: Kevin Youkilis (1), David Ortiz (1), Manny Ramírez (2); CLE: Casey Blake (1), Jhonny Peralta (2); Attendance: 44,008; Boxscore

After being confounded for four innings by Tim Wakefield's knuckleball, the Indians scored seven runs in the bottom of the fifth in Game 4. Casey Blake led off the inning with a homer off Wakefield, Franklin Gutiérrez singled, Kelly Shoppach was hit by a pitch, and Grady Sizemore reached on a fielder's choice. After Kevin Youkilis bobbled and dropped a foul ball, Asdrúbal Cabrera reached on an infield single as Gutiérrez scored. Travis Hafner struck out, and then Víctor Martínez hit an RBI single to left. At that point, Boston skipper Terry Francona yanked Wakefield for reliever Manny Delcarmen, who gave up an opposite-field home run to Jhonny Peralta on a 2–1 pitch. Kenny Lofton followed with a single, then stole second—his 34th career postseason stolen base, passing Rickey Henderson for first place on the all-time list—and scored on Blake's second base hit of the inning. Gutiérrez struck out to end the inning, but the Indians had already scored seven runs—the second time in this series in which the Indians plated seven in one inning. This also marks the third consecutive game in this ALCS wherein Boston's starter lasted only 4 2/3 innings.
The Red Sox answered immediately when Youkilis and David Ortiz hit back-to-back homers, chasing Indians starter Paul Byrd in favor of rookie reliever Jensen Lewis. Manny Ramírez followed with another homer—the Red Sox' third consecutive home run, something that had never before been accomplished in LCS history—in the top of the sixth inning. However, that would be all the offense the Red Sox could muster as the Indians took a three games to one lead in the series behind Byrd, Lewis, and fellow reliever Rafael Betancourt.

=== Game 5 ===
October 18, 2007 8:23 pm (EDT) at Jacobs Field in Cleveland, Ohio 70 °F (21 °C), clear
Team	1	2	3	4	5	6	7	8	9	R	H	E
Boston	1	0	1	0	0	0	2	3	0	7	12	1
Cleveland	1	0	0	0	0	0	0	0	0	1	6	1
WP: Josh Beckett (2–0) LP: CC Sabathia (0–2); Home runs: BOS: Kevin Youkilis (2); CLE: None; Attendance: 44,588; Boxscore

Danielle Peck was invited by the Cleveland Indians to sing the National Anthem prior to Game 5 of the American League Championship Series between the Red Sox and Indians. Beckett was the starting pitcher in that game, and some Red Sox fans theorized that her invitation was an attempt by the Indians organization to distract Beckett, since the pair had dated the previous summer. The Indians denied this claim. Cleveland also played the All American Rejects hit song "It Ends Tonight" before the game, predicting that the Indians would win and eliminate the Red Sox that evening. Facing elimination in Game 5, the Sox struck first with a home run from Kevin Youkilis in the top of the first inning off CC Sabathia. The Indians answered right away, putting runners on first and third with nobody out but could only muster one run on Travis Hafner grounding into a double play. The Red Sox regained the lead in the third on a Manny Ramírez RBI single, scoring David Ortiz from first. On the play, Ramírez stopped at first base believing the ball hit beyond the yellow line on the outfield wall, but after discussion among the six umpires, the home run was disallowed and Ramírez was left at first with a single. Meanwhile, Josh Beckett pitched eight dominant innings for the Red Sox, and collected 11 strikeouts, tying a career post-season high. Dustin Pedroia doubled to lead off the seventh and scored on Kevin Youkilis's triple. Rafael Betancourt relieved Sabathia and allowed a sacrifice fly to Ortiz to put Boston up 4–1. Next inning, Boston loaded the bases off Rafael Perez on a walk, error, and single. Tom Mastny relieved Perez and threw a passed ball to Pedroia that let one run score. Mastny then walked Pedroia and Youkilis to reload the bases and force in another run. Ortiz's sacrifice fly then scored Boston's final run. Jonathan Papelbon pitched a scoreless ninth despite allowing a double and walk as the Red Sox's 7–1 win ensured a return trip to Boston for Game 6.

=== Game 6 ===
October 20, 2007 8:24 pm (EDT) at Fenway Park in Boston, Massachusetts 67 °F (19 °C), mostly clear
Team	1	2	3	4	5	6	7	8	9	R	H	E
Cleveland	0	1	0	0	0	0	1	0	0	2	6	2
Boston	4	0	6	0	0	0	0	2	X	12	13	0
WP: Curt Schilling (1–0) LP: Fausto Carmona (0–1); Home runs: CLE: Víctor Martínez (1); BOS: J. D. Drew (1); Attendance: 37,163; Boxscore

After Curt Schilling retired the Indians in the top of the first, the Red Sox loaded the bases on infield hits by Dustin Pedroia and Kevin Youkilis plus a full-count walk to David Ortiz. Fausto Carmona struck out Manny Ramírez and got Mike Lowell to pop out, but J. D. Drew then hit a grand slam to center field to give Boston a 4–0 lead. Víctor Martínez got the Tribe on the board with a lead-off home run to cut the Sox lead to three. The Sox had a chance to pile on more runs in the bottom of the inning but a key double play ended the threat. The Indians threatened in the top of the third after two hits to lead off the inning but Schilling got the next three batters to work out of it. The Sox put the game away with a six-run explosion in the bottom of the inning. After two leadoff walks, Drew drove in his fifth run of the game with a single in the third inning that ended Carmona's pitching that night. Jacoby Ellsbury followed with another single off Rafael Perez, driving in Boston's sixth run. Julio Lugo then drove a double down the third-base line to make it 8–1. After a walk, Youkilis added two more with a single compounded with a throwing error to make it 10–1. Ryan Garko started the top of the seventh with a triple and scored on a Jhonny Peralta sacrifice fly, but that would be all the offense Cleveland could muster against Schilling on the night. The Red Sox scored two more runs in the eighth off Joe Borowski when Youkilis walked with one out, moved to third on Ortiz's double and scored on Ramirez's sacrifice fly before Lowell's RBI single scored their final run, tying the series at three games apiece.

=== Game 7 ===
October 21, 2007 8:24 pm (EDT) at Fenway Park in Boston, Massachusetts 65 °F (18 °C), clear
Team	1	2	3	4	5	6	7	8	9	R	H	E
Cleveland	0	0	0	1	1	0	0	0	0	2	10	1
Boston	1	1	1	0	0	0	2	6	X	11	15	1
WP: Daisuke Matsuzaka (1–1) LP: Jake Westbrook (1–1) Sv: Jonathan Papelbon (1); Home runs: CLE: None; BOS: Dustin Pedroia (1), Kevin Youkilis (3); Attendance: 37,165; Boxscore

The pitching matchup for Game 7 was a rematch of Game 3, featuring Jake Westbrook for Cleveland and Japanese rookie Daisuke Matsuzaka for Boston. The Red Sox returned Cleveland's favor from Game 5 by playing "It Ends Tonight" before the game, poking fun at the Indians' untimely prediction. In the first three innings, Matsuzaka looked like the more dominant starting pitcher of the night retiring the first eight batters he faced before giving up a base hit to number-nine hitter Casey Blake; he then struck out Grady Sizemore to end the inning. Meanwhile, during those same first three innings, Westbrook gave up seven hits, one walk (intentionally), and three runs (on Manny Ramirez's RBI single in the first after two leadoff singles, Julio Lugo's double play in the second after a leadoff single and double, and Mike Lowell's sacrifice fly in the third with two on). Westbrook settled down and pitched three shutout innings, striking out four, and their offense began to take advantage of Matsuzaka putting up single runs in the top of the fourth (on Ryan Garko's RBI double after a Travis Hafner double) and fifth (on Grady Sizemore's sacrifice fly). Boston's top two relief pitchers took over after Matsuzaka's exit following the fifth inning; Hideki Okajima and Jonathan Papelbon were able to hold Indians hitters scoreless over the final four frames, giving up just four hits combined, all singles.

In the seventh inning with one out and Kenny Lofton at second base, Franklin Gutiérrez singled over the third base bag, into foul territory, with the ball ricocheting back into left field off the infamous angular foul territory fence of Fenway Park. Shortstop Julio Lugo and outfielder Manny Ramirez went after the ball. As he was about to turn toward home plate, third base coach Joel Skinner controversially held Lofton at third, as he would have been the game-tying run. The Indians' at-bat ended when Casey Blake hit into a 5–4–3 double play.

Rookies Jacoby Ellsbury and Dustin Pedroia were the center of the offense in the seventh with Ellsbury reaching second on a Blake error then Dustin Pedroia hit a two-run home run off Rafael Betancourt into the Green Monster seats, giving the Red Sox some insurance runs, before they put up a six-spot in the bottom of the eighth against the collapsing Cleveland bullpen. Lowell doubled with one out and scored on J.D. Drew's single. After a ground-rule double, intentional walk, and strikeout, a three-RBI double by Pedroia knocked Betancourt out of the game, then a two-run Kevin Youkilis home run off Jensen Lewis made it 11–2 Red Sox, which cemented their victory and led to their second American League championship and World Series appearance in four years.

This marked the third time Boston came back from a three games to one deficit in a League Championship Series. They had previously done so in 1986 and in the historic 2004 series from which they came back from a 3–0 deficit. It was a painful defeat for Cleveland, as they had blown such a big lead in games to cost them a shot at going to their first World Series in 10 years. After previously holding a 2–0 series lead in the 1999 ALDS, this marked Cleveland's second consecutive postseason series loss to Boston where Cleveland lost three straight series-clinching games to lose the series. The Indians would not return to the playoffs for the next six years.

== Composite box ==
2007 ALCS (4–3): Boston Red Sox over Cleveland Indians

Team	1	2	3	4	5	6	7	8	9	10	11	R	H	E
Boston Red Sox	7	1	15	0	6	5	6	11	0	0	0	51	77	3
Cleveland Indians	3	3	0	4	11	2	1	1	0	0	7	32	62	5
Total attendance: 281,363 Average attendance: 40,195

== Aftermath ==
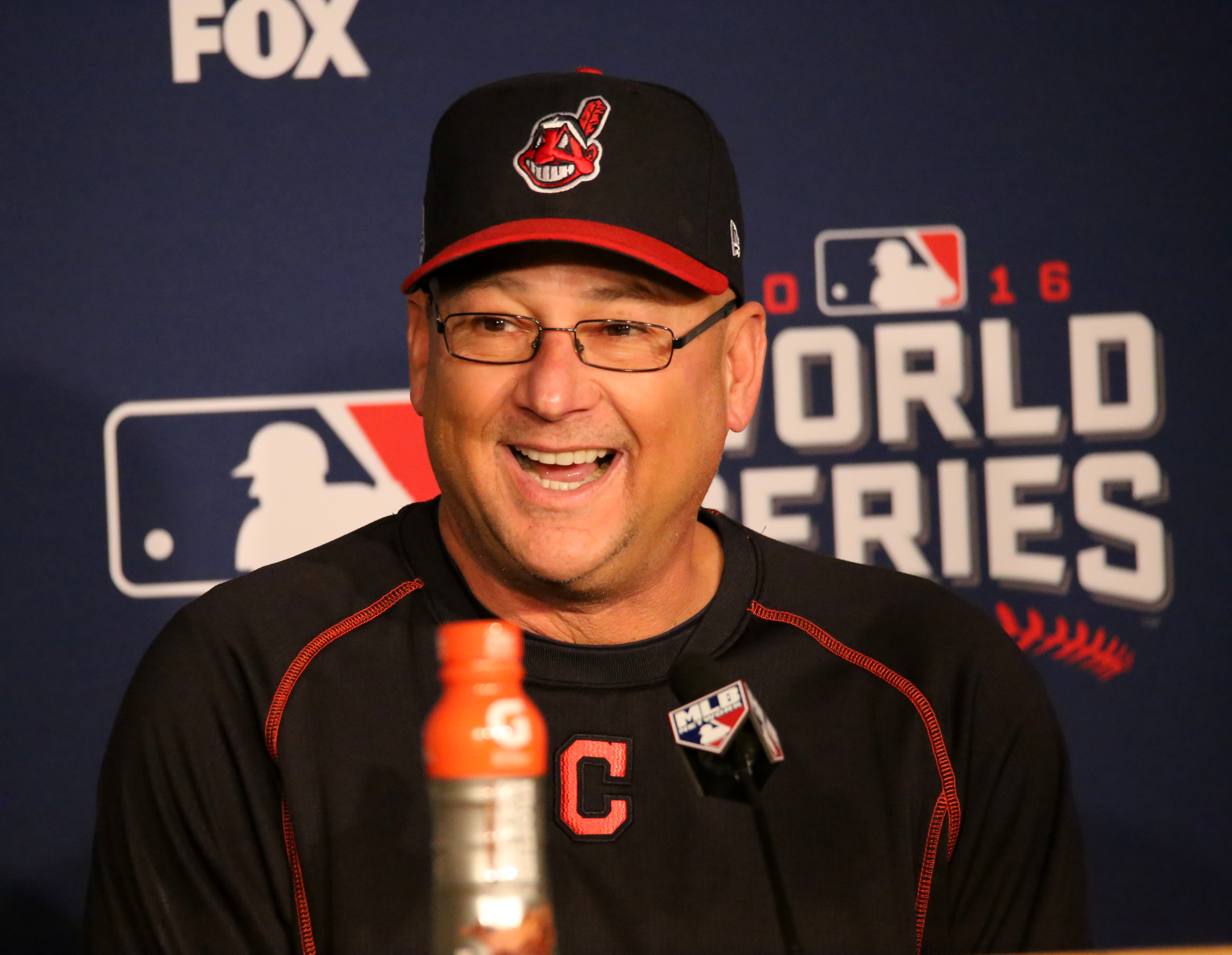
Terry Francona, Cleveland's manager from 2013–2019 and again from 2021–2023.

The 2007 postseason would ultimately be remembered for winning streaks. The NL pennant-winning Colorado Rockies had been 7–0 in the postseason until the World Series, also winning 21 of 22 games (regular season and postseason). The Red Sox rode their 3–1 series comeback momentum into the World Series by sweeping the Rockies, thus in the process, winning their last seven games.

Similar to the Diamondbacks and the Rockies in the NLCS, the 2007 Indians were in essence a one-season wonder. It was the first season they made the postseason since 2001, and on the other end, they did not seriously compete until they returned to the postseason as a wild card in 2013 – losing in an AL Wild Card Game to the Tampa Bay Rays, and did not win the AL Central again until 2016. Cleveland almost immediately began a re-build after the 2007 postseason loss to Boston. In 2008, ace pitcher C.C. Sabathia was traded to Milwaukee at the trade deadline for young players and prospects. Similarly, Cliff Lee, who broke out as the team's ace in 2008 by winning the Cy Young Award, was traded to Philadelphia at the 2009 trade deadline.

After a disappointing 2011 season, a year where the Red Sox missed the playoffs despite being considered heavy favorites to win the World Series, Terry Francona and the Red Sox decided mutually part ways after eight successful seasons. On October 6, 2012, Francona became the 46th manager of the Cleveland Indians. Francona led them to their first pennant since 1997. On their way to the 2016 pennant, the Indians beat the Red Sox in the American League Division Series, via a three game sweep. Coco Crisp, a member of the 2007 Red Sox, also joined Francona in Cleveland, while David Ortiz and Dustin Pedroia were the only members of the 2007 Red Sox's still on the team. Game 3 of the 2016 American League Division Series was Ortiz's last game of his career. In Cleveland, Francona won the American League Manager of the Year in 2013, 2016, and 2022. Francona would seemingly retire in 2023 due to health issues, but later managed the Cincinnati Reds starting in 2025.

== See also ==
- Cleveland sports curse
- Curse of Rocky Colavito
