= Eric Wedge =

American baseball player & manager (born 1968)

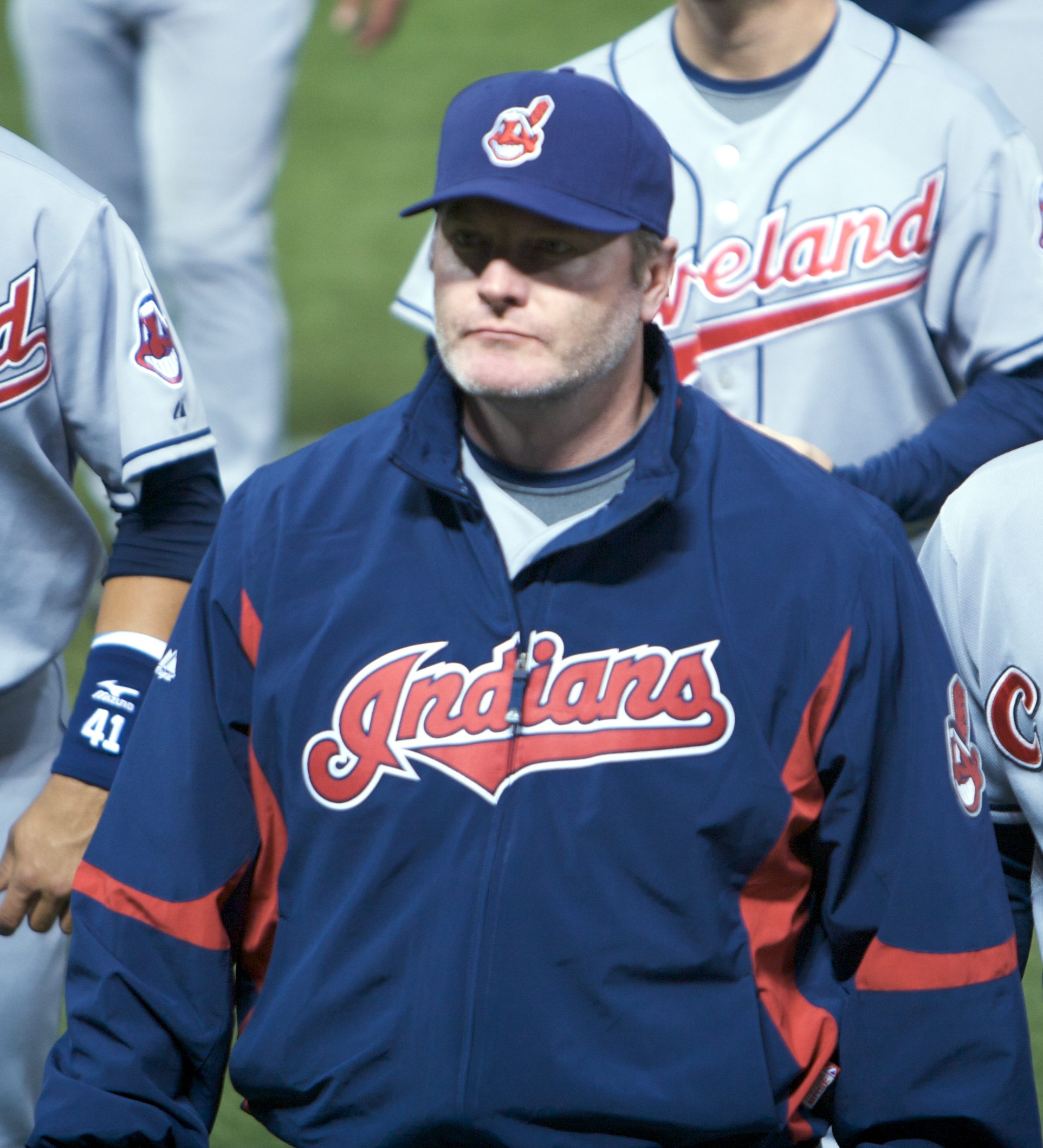
- Wedge as manager of the Indians in 2008

Tulsa Drillers
- Catcher / Manager
- Born: January 27, 1968 (age 58); Fort Wayne, Indiana, U.S.
- Batted: Right Threw: Right

MLB debut
- October 5, 1991, for the Boston Red Sox

Last MLB appearance
- July 29, 1994, for the Boston Red Sox

MLB statistics
- Batting average: .233
- Home runs: 5
- Runs batted in: 12
- Managerial record: 774–846
- Winning %: .478
- Stats at Baseball Reference
- Managerial record at Baseball Reference

Teams
- As player: Boston Red Sox (1991–1992); Colorado Rockies (1993); Boston Red Sox (1994); As manager: Cleveland Indians (2003–2009); Seattle Mariners (2011–2013)

Career highlights and awards
- AL Manager of the Year (2007)

Eric Michael Wedge (born January 27, 1968) is an American former baseball Major League Baseball (MLB) catcher and manager. He currently is the manager of the minor league Tulsa Drillers. He managed the Cleveland Indians and Seattle Mariners in MLB and played for the Boston Red Sox and Colorado Rockies.

Wedge played college baseball for the Wichita State Shockers, winning the 1989 College World Series and being named an All American. From 1989 to 1997, he played in the minor league systems of the Red Sox, Rockies, Detroit Tigers, and Philadelphia Phillies. He played in 39 major league games with the Red Sox and Rockies between 1991 and 1994.

Wedge managed in the Indians minor league system from 1998 to 2002 before being named Cleveland's manager for the 2003 season. He led the Indians to a postseason berth in 2007 and won the American League Manager of the Year Award that year. He managed the Indians through the 2009 season. He then managed the Seattle Mariners from 2011 to 2013, and then worked as player development advisor for the Toronto Blue Jays from 2016 to 2019. Wedge returned to manage the Shockers from 2020 to 2022.

== Amateur career ==
Wedge played baseball in Wallen Little League and attended school in Fort Wayne, Indiana. He attended Northrop High School and played on the school's state champion baseball team in 1983 as a freshman.

Wedge then attended Wichita State University and played catcher and center field for Shockers from 1987 to 1989, leading the school to a 68–16 record and the College World Series championship in 1989. He hit .380 for the Shockers that year, led the NCAA in walks and total bases and finished second in runs, RBI, and home runs. Wedge's performance earned him first-team All-America honors, and the Missouri Valley Conference Player of the Year award. He was runner-up to Ben McDonald for the Rotary Smith Award for College Baseball Player of the Year.

In 1987, Wedge played for the Lima Blues. He was the MVP of the first Great Lakes Summer Collegiate League (GLSCL) All-Star Game.

In 1988, Wedge played collegiate summer baseball in the Cape Cod Baseball League (CCBL) for the Yarmouth–Dennis Red Sox, where he was named to the all-league team. In 2011, he was inducted into the CCBL Hall of Fame.

== Playing career ==
The Boston Red Sox selected Wedge in the third round of the 1989 Major League Baseball draft. While in the Red Sox major league system, he played for the Elmira Pioneers (1989), New Britain Red Sox (1989–1991), Winter Haven Red Sox (1991) and Pawtucket Red Sox (1991–1992, 1994–1995). On October 5, 1991, he made his major league debut in his only appearance of the season for Boston with a pinch hit single off Chris George of the Milwaukee Brewers. In 1992, he appeared in 27 games for Boston (20 as a designated hitter, five as a catcher and two as a pinch hitter), hitting .250 with five home runs and 11 RBI.

In November 1992, the Colorado Rockies selected Wedge from the Red Sox in the 1992 MLB expansion draft. He played for the Central Valley Rockies and Colorado Springs Sky Sox in 1993 and was a September call-up for Colorado that season, appearing in nine games (eight as a pinch hitter and one as a catcher) and hitting .182 with 1 RBI.

The Rockies released Wedge at the end of spring training in 1994, and he re-signed with the Red Sox on May 2. He split catching duties with Scott Hatteberg for Pawtucket that season and made his final major-league appearances with Boston in July, going 0-for-6 in two games as a designated hitter. He returned to Pawtucket for the 1995 season and again split catching duties with Hatteberg.

Wedge played his final two seasons with the Toledo Mud Hens in the Detroit Tigers organization and the Scranton/Wilkes-Barre Red Barons in the Philadelphia Phillies organization in 1996 and 1997, respectively.

== Managerial career ==
=== Cleveland Indians ===
==== Minor leagues ====
Wedge made his managerial debut in 1998 with the Columbus RedStixx of the South Atlantic League, leading the Cleveland single-A affiliate to an overall record of 59–81. In 1999, he was the manager of the Kinston Indians, Cleveland's Carolina League affiliate. His team took first place during the first half of the season with a 37–32 record and second place during the second half with a 42–26 record. After the season, he was named the Carolina League Manager of the Year.

The Indians promoted Wedge to manager of the Double-A Akron Aeros in 2000. The Aeros finished the season 75–68, just missing the Eastern League post-season after losing a one-game playoff with Harrisburg. In 2001, he continued his ascent through the Indians' managerial ranks, leading their Triple-A affiliate, Buffalo Bisons, to a 91–51 first-place finish in the International League's North Division and a berth in the postseason, where they lost to Scranton/Wilkes-Barre Red Barons in the semi-finals. Wedge again earned post-season honors when he was named the International League Manager of the Year and Baseball America's Triple-A Manager of the Year. He returned at the helm of the Bisons in 2002 and again led them to the post-season, finishing 87–57 and second in the North Division. This time, they defeated Scranton in the semi-finals but were swept by the Durham Bulls in the finals. Wedge was honored with his third post-season award when The Sporting News named him Minor League Manager of the Year.

==== Major leagues ====
On October 29, 2002, Wedge was named the 39th manager of the Cleveland Indians. Over his first three years as manager, the Indians improved steadily from fourth place in the American League (AL) Central with a 68–94 record in 2003, to 80–82 and third place in 2004 and to 93–69 and second place in 2005. The 93 wins in 2005 were the eighth-most in the more than 100-year history of the franchise. The team narrowly missed qualifying for the playoffs for the first time since 2001 when they were eliminated on the last day of the season. Wedge finished second to Ozzie Guillén in the AL Manager of the Year balloting.

The 2006 season was a disappointing one for Wedge and the Indians. Entering the season, they were expected to compete for the division title, but got off to a poor start and were essentially out of the race by mid-season, trailing the division-leading Detroit Tigers at the All-Star break by 18 1/2 games. They finished the season in fourth place with a 78–84 record, 18 games behind the Central division champion Minnesota Twins.

Wedge and the Indians had more success in the 2007 season going 96–66 and winning the division title for the first time since 2001. Wedge then led the Indians to beat the Yankees in four games to win the AL Division Series, and moved on to play the Boston Red Sox in the AL Championship Series, where they lost in seven games after losing three straight games when leading the series 3–1. Wedge received The Sporting News Manager of the Year Award and the AL Manager of the Year Award in 2007.

The following year, the Indians would go 81–81, finishing third in the division. The club, which was just four wins shy from winning 100 games in 2007, fell to the other end of the spectrum in 2009, finishing three losses from the century mark at 65–97, fourth in the division. On September 30, the Indians announced that Wedge would not be retained as manager.

=== Seattle Mariners ===
On October 18, 2010, Wedge was named the Seattle Mariners manager, signing a three-year contract. His teams finished in last place in the AL West in all three season. In 2011, the team finished 67–95, 29 games out of first place. The following year, he led the team to a 75–87 record. Wedge suffered a stroke in July 2013 and missed 28 games. On September 27, Wedge announced he would not return to the Mariners in 2014, declining an offered one-year contract extension.

=== Toronto Blue Jays ===
On February 6, 2016, Wedge was hired as a player development advisor by the Toronto Blue Jays. He interviewed for the vacant New York Yankees managerial position in November 2017.

=== Wichita State Shockers ===
On May 29, 2019, Wedge was named head baseball coach of the Wichita State Shockers. On December 8, 2022, the school announced he would not return as coach. He reached a settlement with the university in February 2023, paying him $675,000, half the amount remaining on his contract.

=== Tulsa Drillers ===
On January 23, 2025, Wedge was announced as manager of the Tulsa Drillers, the Los Angeles Dodgers affiliate in the Double-A Texas League. The team went 66–72 and lost in the playoffs in Wedge's first minor league managerial role since 2002.

=== Major league managerial record ===
As of the end of the 2013 season

Team	Year	Regular season					Postseason			
Team	Year	Games	Won	Lost	Win %	Finish	Won	Lost	Win %	Result
CLE	2003	162	68	94	.420	4th in AL Central	–	–	–	–
CLE	2004	162	80	82	.494	3rd in AL Central	–	–	–	–
CLE	2005	162	93	69	.574	2nd in AL Central	–	–	–	–
CLE	2006	162	78	84	.481	4th in AL Central	–	–	–	–
CLE	2007	162	96	66	.593	1st in AL Central	6	5	.545	Lost ALCS (BOS)
CLE	2008	162	81	81	.500	3rd in AL Central	–	–	–	–
CLE	2009	162	65	97	.401	4th in AL Central	–	–	–	–
CLE total		1134	561	573	.495		6	5	.545	
SEA	2011	162	67	95	.414	4th in AL West	–	–	–	–
SEA	2012	162	75	87	.463	4th in AL West	–	–	–	–
SEA	2013	162	71	91	.438	4th in AL West	–	–	–	–
SEA total		486	213	273	.438		0	0	–	
Total		1620	774	846	.478		6	5	.545	

=== Collegiate coaching record ===
As of the end of the 2022 season

Record table
Season	Team	Overall	Conference	Standing	Postseason
Wichita State Shockers (American Athletic Conference) (2020–2022)
2020	Wichita State	13–2	0–0		Season canceled due to COVID-19
2021	Wichita State	31–23	18–13	3rd	The American Tournament
2022	Wichita State	21–36	9–15	T-6th	The American Tournament
Wichita State:		65–61	27–28		
Total:		65–61			
National champion Postseason invitational champion Conference regular season champion Conference regular season and conference tournament champion Division regular season champion Division regular season and conference tournament champion Conference tournament champion

== Broadcasting career ==
Wedge joined Baseball Tonight on ESPN as a studio analyst for the 2014 and 2015 seasons alongside Ozzie Guillén and Dallas Braden. Wedge's analysis was featured in a segment called "Cutting The Wedge."

== Personal life ==
In 2018, Wedge's hosted his 14th yearly baseball camp organized by World Baseball Academy at The ASH Centre in Fort Wayne, Indiana. In January 2007, he was inducted into the Indiana High School Baseball Hall of Fame, and in February 2007, he was inducted into the Kinston Professional Baseball Hall of Fame. In total, Wedge has been inducted to 14 halls of fame.

Wedge and ex-wife have a daughter and a son. Wedge resides in Wichita, Kansas.
