= Rafael Pérez (baseball) =

Dominican baseball player (born 1982)

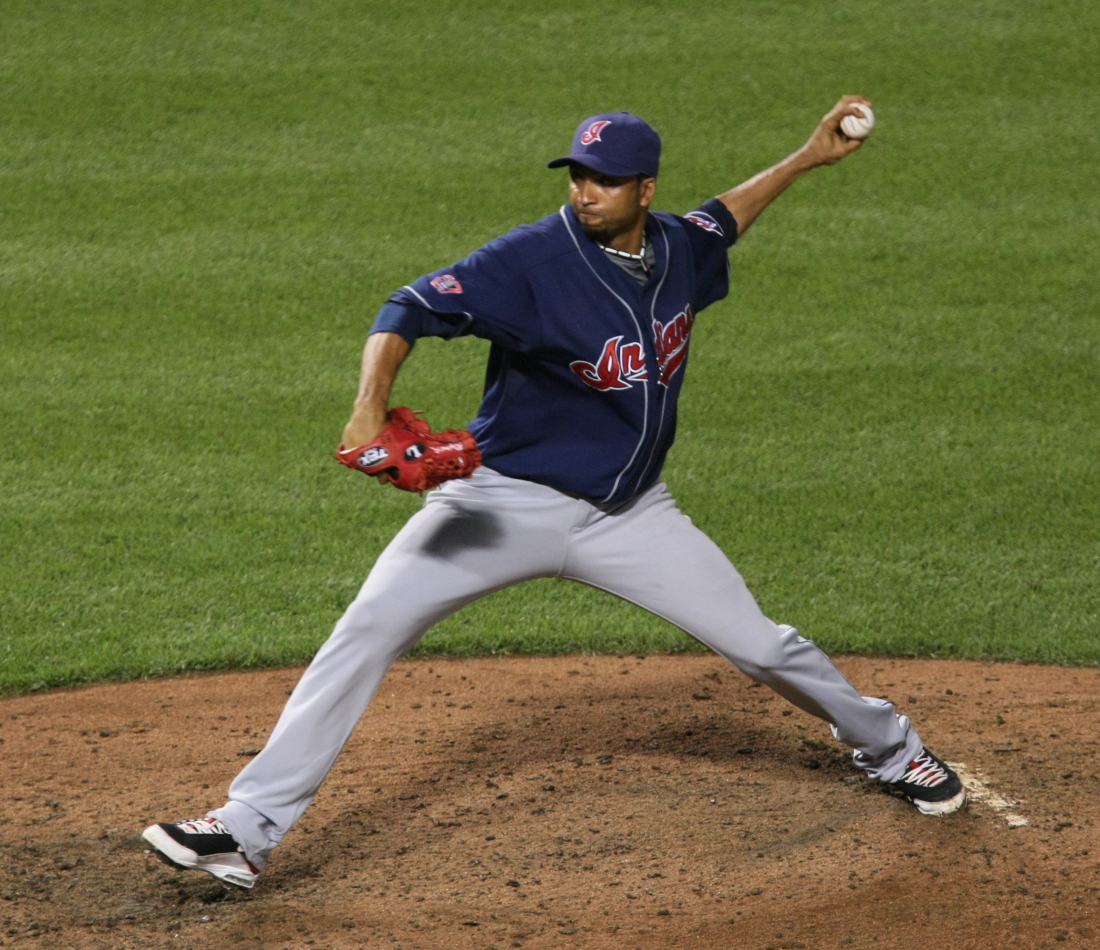
- Perez with the Cleveland Indians
- Pitcher
- Born: May 15, 1982 (age 43); Santo Domingo, Dominican Republic
- Batted: Left Threw: Left

MLB debut
- April 20, 2006, for the Cleveland Indians

Last appearance
- April 28, 2012, for the Cleveland Indians

MLB statistics
- Win–loss record: 21–12
- Earned run average: 3.64
- Strikeouts: 268
- Stats at Baseball Reference

Teams
- Cleveland Indians (2006–2012); Chunichi Dragons (2015)

Rafael Jerome Pérez (born May 15, 1982) is a Dominican former left-handed professional baseball relief pitcher. He played in Major League Baseball (MLB) for the Cleveland Indians from 2006 to 2012, and in Nippon Professional Baseball (NPB) for the Chunichi Dragons in 2015. He was signed by the Indians as an undrafted free agent in 2002 and played with them through 2012. He lives in Freeport, New York, on Long Island.

== Professional career ==
=== Cleveland Indians ===
In 2002, Pérez finished second in the Dominican Summer League with a 0.96 ERA. In 2003, he was named Appalachian League Pitcher of the Year playing for the Rookie-level Burlington Indians, going 9–3 with a 1.70 ERA in 13 games (12 starts). His nine wins led the Appalachian League. In 2005, his 12 wins tied for third in Indians organization and he had a 2.62 ERA in 29 combined appearances (22 starts) for the Single-A Kinston Indians and Double-A Akron Aeros. He was added to the Indians 40-man roster in November. In 2006, Pérez went 4–5 with a 2.81 ERA in 12 starts with Akron, and was 0–3 with a 2.63 ERA in 13 relief appearances with the Triple-A Buffalo Bisons.

On April 20, 2006, Pérez was recalled by Cleveland when Matt Miller was placed on the disabled list. He made his MLB debut that day against the Baltimore Orioles, pitching one inning and striking out two. Pérez made 18 appearances with Cleveland in 2006, posting a 4.38 ERA.

Pérez was not expected to be a major part of the Indians' major league club in 2007, but he surprised the Indians organization after he was called up from the team's Triple-A affiliate, the Buffalo Bisons, on May 28. Pérez was initially slated for long relief, but after he demonstrated his ability to pitch in tight situations, he was inserted into a setup role alongside right-handed reliever Rafael Betancourt. The two setup men were nicknamed Raffy Left and Raffy Right by local Indians fans. Pérez, with his hard fastball and tight slider, quickly became one of the most dominant relievers in the league. In 2007, Pérez was 1–2 with one save and a sparkling 1.78 ERA over 60 2/3 innings pitched in 44 appearances. He had a WHIP (walks plus hits per inning pitched) of only .923, and held left-handed batters to just a .145 batting average. ESPN analyst Peter Gammons called him "arguably the best left-handed reliever on the planet."

In the 2007 postseason, Pérez was excellent in the 2007 American League Division Series against the New York Yankees, going 1–0 with a 1.50 ERA in three games. He threw six innings, allowing one earned run and striking out six. However, in the 2007 American League Championship Series, Pérez faltered, posting a 45.00 ERA in three games, with eight runs (five earned) allowed in one inning. The Indians went on to lose the series in seven games to the Boston Red Sox.

Pérez spent the entire 2008 season with Cleveland, going 4–4 with two saves and a 3.54 ERA in 73 relief appearances. He struck out 86 batters in 76 1/3 innings pitched.

The 2009 season was a difficult one for Pérez. He began the season with a 15.19 ERA in 13 games, and was sent to the Triple-A Columbus Clippers on May 6. On May 29, Pérez was recalled from Columbus after David Dellucci was designated for assignment. He was sent down again on July 8, and recalled again on August 7 for the remainder of the season. Pérez finished the season with a 4–3 record and a 7.31 ERA in 54 relief appearances.

In 2010, Pérez rebounded from his 2009 campaign, going 6–1 with a 3.25 ERA in 70 relief appearances. He led all Indians relievers in wins and tied for the team lead in appearances with fellow left-hander Tony Sipp. Pérez posted similar numbers in 2011, with a 5–2 record and a 3.00 ERA in 71 appearances.

Pérez began the 2012 season 1–0 with a 3.52 ERA in eight relief appearances, but was eventually placed on the disabled list on April 27 due to a strained side muscle. He was initially expected to miss up to six weeks, but suffered several setbacks, and he eventually underwent surgery on his shoulder in September. On November 28, Pérez was designated for assignment. Two days later, he elected free agency.

=== Minnesota Twins ===
On February 14, 2013, Pérez signed a minor league contract with the Minnesota Twins. He made four appearances for the Triple-A Rochester Red Wings, logging a 1-0 record and 2.25 ERA with two strikeouts over four innings of work. Pérez was released by the Twins organization on May 17.

=== Boston Red Sox ===
On May 23, 2013, Pérez signed a minor league contract with the Boston Red Sox organization. With the Double-A Portland Sea Dogs, he pitched in 25 games and compiled a 2–2 record with six saves, 30 strikeouts, and a 2.64 ERA.

=== Texas Rangers ===
Pérez signed a minor league contract with the Texas Rangers on January 18, 2014. Pérez only appeared in four games for the Triple-A Round Rock Express before he was released on April 17; in those games, he struggled to an 0-1 record and 7.36 ERA with four strikeouts over 3 2/3 innings.

=== Rojos del Águila de Veracruz ===
On May 5, 2014, Pérez signed with the Rojos del Águila de Veracruz of the Mexican League. With Veracruz, he accumulated a 3–5 record with a 3.92 ERA and 42 strikeouts across 10 appearances (including eight starts). Pérez was released by the Rojos on July 11.

=== Pittsburgh Pirates ===
On July 12, 2014, Pérez signed a minor league contract with the Pittsburgh Pirates organization. He was assigned to the Triple-A Indianapolis Indians, where he posted a 3–1 record and 1.77 ERA with 34 strikeouts in 56 innings pitched across 10 games (eight starts).

=== Tigres de Quintana Roo ===
Pérez signed a minor league contract with the Seattle Mariners on February 12, 2015. He was invited to spring training, but did not make the team. On April 9, Pérez signed with the Tigres de Quintana Roo of the Mexican League. He made 13 starts for the Tigres, registering a 5-5 record and 1.99 ERA with 52 strikeouts across 81 1/3 innings pitched. Pérez's release was announced on July 2.

=== Chunichi Dragons ===
On July 13, 2015, Pérez signed with the Chunichi Dragons of Nippon Professional Baseball for the remainder of the season. He appeared in just four games with the Dragons, recording an 0–1 record with a 1.64 ERA and nine strikeouts spanning 11 innings.

=== Long Island Ducks ===
On March 28, 2017, Pérez signed with the Long Island Ducks of the Atlantic League of Professional Baseball. He made 22 starts for the Ducks, accumulating an 8-7 record and 4.72 ERA with 83 strikeouts across 108 2/3 innings pitched. Pérez became a free agent after the season.
