= 2007 American League Division Series =

Teams
Team (Wins)		Manager	Season
Boston Red Sox (3)		Terry Francona	96–66 (.593), GA: 2
Los Angeles Angels of Anaheim (0)		Mike Scioscia	94–68 (.580), GA: 6
- Dates: October 3–7
- Television: TBS
- TV announcers: Ted Robinson, Steve Stone, and Jose Mota
- Radio: ESPN
- Radio announcers: Dan Shulman and Dave Campbell
- Umpires: Gary Darling, Dan Iassogna, Brian Runge, Ted Barrett, Tim Tschida, C. B. Bucknor

Teams
Team (Wins)		Manager	Season
Cleveland Indians (3)		Eric Wedge	96–66 (.593), GA: 8
New York Yankees (1)		Joe Torre	94–68 (.580), GB: 2
- Dates: October 4–8
- Television: TBS
- TV announcers: Chip Caray, Tony Gwynn, Bob Brenly, and Craig Sager
- Radio: ESPN
- Radio announcers: Jon Miller and Dusty Baker
- Umpires: Bruce Froemming†, Laz Díaz, Ron Kulpa, Fieldin Culbreth, Gerry Davis, Jim Wolf †: Froemming was officiating his final games after a record 37 full seasons as a major league umpire.

The 2007 American League Division Series (ALDS) consisted of two best-of-five playoff series on the American League side in Major League Baseball’s (MLB) 2007 postseason, began on Wednesday, October 3 and ended on Monday, October 8, with the champions of the three AL divisions and one wild card team, participating in two series.

Under MLB's playoff format, no two teams from the same division were matched up in the Division Series, regardless of whether their records would normally indicate such a matchup. Home field advantage went to the team with the better regular-season record with the exception of the wild card team, which defers home field advantage regardless of record. The matchups were:

- (1) Boston Red Sox (AL East champions) vs. (3) Los Angeles Angels of Anaheim (AL West champions): Red Sox won the series, 3–0.
- (2) Cleveland Indians (AL Central champions) vs. (4) New York Yankees (Wild Card qualifier): Indians won the series, 3–1.

The Red Sox got to choose whether their series started on October 3 or October 4, the first time a team was given this choice – Boston chose to begin their Division Series on October 3.

The Red Sox and Angels met for the third time in the postseason, following the 1986 AL Championship Series and the 2004 ALDS, with Boston winning all three and extending their postseason victory streak over the Angels to nine consecutive games (the Angels hadn't beaten the Red Sox in the playoffs since Game 4 of the 1986 ALCS). The Indians and Yankees met in the postseason for the third time with the Indians winning, following their triumph in the 1997 ALDS and the Yankees' win in the 1998 ALCS.

The Red Sox and Indians met in the AL Championship Series, with the Red Sox becoming the American League champion and going on to beat the National League champion Colorado Rockies in the 2007 World Series in a sweep.

== Matchups ==
=== Boston Red Sox vs. Los Angeles Angels of Anaheim ===
Boston won the series, 3–0.

Game	Date	Score	Location	Time	Attendance
1	October 3	Los Angeles Angels of Anaheim – 0, Boston Red Sox – 4	Fenway Park	2:27	37,597
2	October 5	Los Angeles Angels of Anaheim – 3, Boston Red Sox – 6	Fenway Park	4:05	37,706
3	October 7	Boston Red Sox – 9, Los Angeles Angels of Anaheim – 1	Angel Stadium of Anaheim	3:29	45,262

=== Cleveland Indians vs. New York Yankees ===
Cleveland won the series, 3–1.

Game	Date	Score	Location	Time	Attendance
1	October 4	New York Yankees – 3, Cleveland Indians – 12	Jacobs Field	3:44	44,608
2	October 5	New York Yankees – 1, Cleveland Indians – 2 (11)	Jacobs Field	4:23	44,732
3	October 7	Cleveland Indians – 4, New York Yankees – 8	Yankee Stadium (I)	3:38	56,358
4	October 8	Cleveland Indians – 6, New York Yankees – 4	Yankee Stadium (I)	4:03	56,315

== Boston vs. Los Angeles ==
=== Game 1 ===
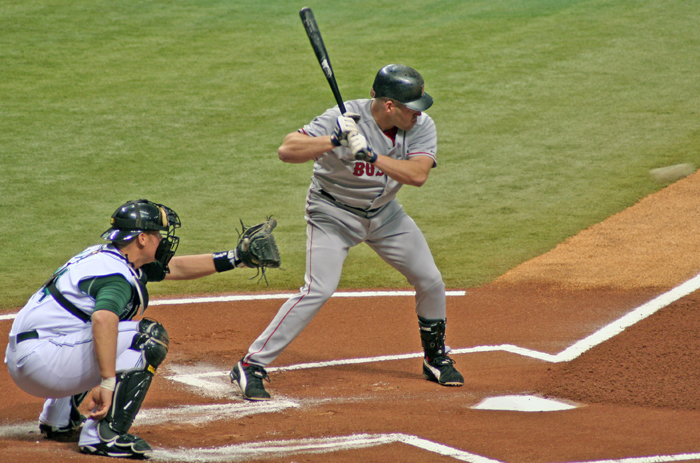
All Star Kevin Youkilis

October 3, 2007 6:38 pm (EDT) at Fenway Park in Boston, Massachusetts 63 °F (17 °C), mostly cloudy
Team	1	2	3	4	5	6	7	8	9	R	H	E
Los Angeles	0	0	0	0	0	0	0	0	0	0	4	0
Boston	1	0	3	0	0	0	0	0	X	4	9	0
WP: Josh Beckett (1–0) LP: John Lackey (0–1); Home runs: LAA: None; BOS: Kevin Youkilis (1), David Ortiz (1); Attendance: 37,597; Boxscore

In Game 1, Boston starter Josh Beckett threw a complete-game shutout, surrendering just four hits, walking none, and striking out eight batters. After giving up a leadoff single to Chone Figgins, Beckett proceeded to retire 19 straight Angels batters with just the second Angels hit coming off the bat of Vladimir Guerrero in the top of the seventh inning (Guerrero was stranded at first base after Beckett got the next two batters out).

Beckett was backed by a solo home run from Kevin Youkilis in the bottom of the first inning, then a two-run home run from David Ortiz in the third inning, scoring Youkilis who had doubled to left field in the previous at bat. Manny Ramirez walked following Ortiz's home run, moved to second on a wild pitch, and scored on Mike Lowell's single for the Red Sox's final run.

Los Angeles starter John Lackey gave up nine hits and four runs over six innings, settling down after the third inning, giving up a hit and a walk before exiting after the sixth inning. Ervin Santana relieved Lackey in the seventh inning and threw two perfect innings, but the Angels dropped the opener, 4–0.

=== Game 2 ===
October 5, 2007 8:39 pm (EDT) at Fenway Park in Boston, Massachusetts 78 °F (26 °C), clear
Team	1	2	3	4	5	6	7	8	9	R	H	E
Los Angeles	0	3	0	0	0	0	0	0	0	3	7	0
Boston	2	0	0	0	1	0	0	0	3	6	6	1
WP: Jonathan Papelbon (1–0) LP: Justin Speier (0–1); Home runs: LAA: None; BOS: Manny Ramírez (1); Attendance: 37,706; Boxscore

Neither starting pitcher in Game 2 made it into the sixth inning of the contest. Game 2 became a battle of the bullpens beginning with the Red Sox in the fifth inning with starter Daisuke Matsuzaka lasting just 4 2/3 innings giving up three runs on seven hits. Meanwhile, Angels starter Kelvim Escobar gave up three runs on just four hits and five walks. The Red Sox struck first when they loaded the bases on two walks and a single before J. D. Drew's two-run single put them up 2−0. The Angels responded in the second when Casey Kotchman drew a leadoff walk and moved to third on Kendrys Morales's single. After Howie Kendrick struck out, Jeff Mathis's groundout scored Kotchman before back-to-back RBI doubles by Chone Figgins and Orlando Cabrera gave the Angels their first and only lead of the series. The Red Sox tied the game in the fifth on Mike Lowell's sacrifice fly that scored J. D. Drew.

Scot Shields came on in relief of Escobar and pitched two hitless, scoreless innings, walking three batters, one intentionally. Boston's four relievers—López, Delcarmen, Okajima, and Papelbon—threw 4 1/3 hitless, scoreless innings striking out four and only walking two batters (both by Papelbon). In the bottom of the ninth, Julio Lugo hit a leadoff single off Justin Speier, who got Dustin Pedroia to ground out before being relieved by Francisco Rodríguez. After Kevin Youkilis struck out, the Angels intentionally walked Ortiz giving him four walks on the night—tying a post-season record before the Red Sox won on a three-run walk-off home run from Manny Ramirez, taking a 2–0 series lead.

=== Game 3 ===
October 7, 2007 12:08 pm (PDT) at Angel Stadium of Anaheim in Anaheim, California 78 °F (26 °C), mostly sunny
Team	1	2	3	4	5	6	7	8	9	R	H	E
Boston	0	0	0	2	0	0	0	7	0	9	10	0
Los Angeles	0	0	0	0	0	0	0	0	1	1	8	0
WP: Curt Schilling (1–0) LP: Jered Weaver (0–1); Home runs: BOS: David Ortiz (2), Manny Ramírez (2); LAA: None; Attendance: 45,262; Boxscore

In Game 3, Curt Schilling pitched seven shutout innings, allowing six hits and one walk while striking out four. David Ortiz and Manny Ramírez both homered off Jered Weaver in the fourth inning to put the Sox up 2–0. Boston effectively ended the series with seven runs in the eighth. Scot Shields walked Julio Lugo to lead it off before being relieved by Justin Speier, who allowed an RBI double to Dustin Pedroia (who advanced to third on the throw to home) and sacrifice fly to Kevin Youkilis. Speier then allowed a single to Ortiz and walked Ramirez before Mike Lowell's RBI double made it 5−0 Boston. Darren Oliver relieved Speier and allowed a run-scoring fielder's choice to J. D. Drew and RBI double to Jason Varitek before Coco Crisp capped the scoring with a two-run single. The Angels scored their only run in the ninth off Éric Gagné when Maicer Izturis hit a leadoff double, moved to third on a wild pitch, and scored on Chone Figgins's sacrifice fly. This was the Red Sox' ninth consecutive postseason game victory over the Angels.

=== Composite box ===
2007 ALDS (3–0): Boston Red Sox over Los Angeles Angels of Anaheim

Team	1	2	3	4	5	6	7	8	9	R	H	E
Boston Red Sox	3	0	3	2	1	0	0	7	3	19	25	1
Los Angeles Angels of Anaheim	0	3	0	0	0	0	0	0	1	4	19	0
Total attendance: 120,565 Average attendance: 40,188

== Cleveland vs. New York ==
=== Game 1 ===
October 4, 2007 6:37 pm (EDT) at Jacobs Field in Cleveland, Ohio 72 °F (22 °C), clear
Team	1	2	3	4	5	6	7	8	9	R	H	E
New York	1	0	0	1	1	0	0	0	0	3	5	0
Cleveland	3	0	1	0	5	2	0	1	X	12	14	0
WP: CC Sabathia (1–0) LP: Chien-Ming Wang (0–1); Home runs: NYY: Johnny Damon (1), Robinson Canó (1); CLE: Asdrúbal Cabrera (1), Víctor Martínez (1), Travis Hafner (1), Ryan Garko (1); Attendance: 44,608; Boxscore

Johnny Damon led off the game with a home run off Cleveland starter CC Sabathia, but in the bottom of the inning Chien-Ming Wang allowed a two-out walk to Travis Hafner and single to Victor Martinez before Ryan Garko's RBI single tied the game. After Jhonny Peralta walked to load the bases, Kenny Lofton's two-RBI single put the Indians up 3−1 with Peralta out at third to end the inning. Asdrúbal Cabrera's leadoff home run in the third put the Indians up 4−1, but the Yankees got that run back in the fourth on Robinson Canó's home run. Next inning, Shelley Duncan hit a leadoff single, moved to second on a walk, and scored on Bobby Abreu's RBI double to cut the Indians' lead to 4−3, but the Yankees would not score again while Cleveland blew the game open in the bottom half. Cabrera drew a leadoff walk before Martinez's home run one out later made it 6−3 Indians. After Garko grounded out, Peralta doubled to right and scored on Lofton's single to knock Wang out of the game. Ross Ohlendorf walked Franklin Gutierrez before Casey Blake's two-run double made it 9−3 Indians. Wang was tagged for eight earned runs in 4 2/3 innings. The Indians added to their lead with Hafner's home run and Lofton's RBI double with two on off Ohlendorf in the sixth and Garko's home run in the eighth off Phil Hughes. Sabathia earned the win despite walking six in five innings, and departed after throwing 114 pitches. Lofton tallied three hits and four RBI for Cleveland. The win marked Cleveland's first over the Yankees since 2006, snapping an eight-game losing streak.

=== Game 2 ("The Bug Game") ===
October 5, 2007 5:09 pm (EDT) at Jacobs Field in Cleveland, Ohio 81 °F (27 °C), partly cloudy
Team	1	2	3	4	5	6	7	8	9	10	11	R	H	E
New York	0	0	1	0	0	0	0	0	0	0	0	1	3	0
Cleveland	0	0	0	0	0	0	0	1	0	0	1	2	9	1
WP: Rafael Pérez (1–0) LP: Luis Vizcaíno (0–1); Home runs: NYY: Melky Cabrera (1); CLE: None; Attendance: 44,732; Boxscore

Game 2 featured an old-fashioned pitchers' duel between Fausto Carmona and postseason veteran Andy Pettitte. Carmona looked to be the hard-luck loser after surrendering Melky Cabrera's third-inning home run until the eighth, when Joba Chamberlain walked Grady Sizemore, who advanced to second on a wild pitch, then to third on a sacrifice bunt before scoring the tying run on another wild pitch. The game went into extras, where Travis Hafner drove home the winning run on an 11th-inning bases-loaded single off Luiz Vizcaino.

Late in the game, a swarm of tiny insects circled the mound in the late innings. Play was stopped for a short time to accommodate the players, including Chamberlain, who threw only 12 of his 25 pitches for strikes in suffering a blown save without surrendering a hit. Yankees manager Joe Torre would later say that his decision not to remove his team from the field was one of his biggest regrets as a manager.

=== Game 3 ===
October 7, 2007 6:37 pm (EDT) at Yankee Stadium (I) in The Bronx, New York 70 °F (21 °C), mostly cloudy
Team	1	2	3	4	5	6	7	8	9	R	H	E
Cleveland	1	1	1	0	0	0	0	1	0	4	9	1
New York	0	0	1	0	4	3	0	0	X	8	11	1
WP: Phil Hughes (1–0) LP: Jake Westbrook (0–1); Home runs: CLE: Trot Nixon (1); NYY: Johnny Damon (2); Attendance: 56,358; Boxscore

The Yankees would take Game 3 for their only win of the series despite an early exit from starter Roger Clemens, who left after 2 1/3 innings with a strained hamstring. Rookie Phil Hughes relieved him and threw 3 2/3 scoreless innings for the win, striking out four. The Indians struck first when Asdrúbal Cabrera singled with one out in the first, moved to second on a walk and scored on Ryan Garko's single. Trot Nixon's home run next inning made it 2−0 Indians, who got another run in the third when Travis Hafner walked, moved to second on a wild pitch and scored on Jhonny Peralta's double. The Yankees got on the board in the bottom of the third when Hideki Matsui hit a leadoff single, moved to second on a groundout, then to third on a fielder's choice and scored on Johnny Damon's single. In the fifth, Cleveland starter Jake Westbrook allowed a one-out single to Matsui and subsequent double to Robinson Canó. Melky Cabrera's RBI single cut the Indians lead to one before Damon's three-run home run put the Yankees up 5−3. Next inning, the Yankees loaded the bases on two singles and a walk off of reliever Aaron Fultz when Cano's single scored one run, but right fielder Nixon's misplay allowed two unearned runs to score to make it 8−3 Yankees. The Indians scored one more run in the eighth off Joba Chamberlain when Peralta walked with two outs, moved to second on Kenny Lofton's single, and scored on Nixon's double, but Mariano Rivera retired them in order in the ninth to give the Yankees an 8−4 win, their last postseason win at Old Yankee Stadium.

=== Game 4 ===
October 8, 2007 7:38 pm (EDT) at Yankee Stadium (I) in The Bronx, New York 83 °F (28 °C), overcast
Team	1	2	3	4	5	6	7	8	9	R	H	E
Cleveland	2	2	0	2	0	0	0	0	0	6	13	0
New York	0	1	0	0	0	1	1	0	1	4	12	0
WP: Paul Byrd (1–0) LP: Chien-Ming Wang (0–2) Sv: Joe Borowski (1); Home runs: CLE: Grady Sizemore (1); NYY: Robinson Canó (2), Alex Rodriguez (1), Bobby Abreu (1); Attendance: 56,315; Boxscore

Chien-Ming Wang was called upon to start Game 4 on three days' rest for the Yankees. Grady Sizemore hit a leadoff home run off Wang, who then allowed a one-out single to Travis Hafner, who moved to second on a groundout and scored on Jhonny Peralta's single. Next inning, the Indians loaded the bases off Wang with no outs on two singles and a hit-by-pitch. Mike Mussina came on in relief and allowed one run to score on Sizemore's double play and another on Asdrúbal Cabrera's single. Wang was charged with four runs in one inning while Mussina threw 4 2/3 solid innings, but in the fourth, allowed Cleveland to load the bases on a double and two walks before Víctor Martínez's two-run single proved to be the difference in the Indians 6–4 win. Though four Yankee relievers held Cleveland scoreless for the rest of the game, Cleveland starter Paul Byrd labored but earned the win with five innings of two-run ball. The only runs came on Yankees Captain Derek Jeter's bases loaded single in the second and Robinson Canó's home run in the sixth. Alex Rodriguez's home run in the seventh off Rafael Perez cut the Indians lead to 6−3, but Joe Borowski earned the save in the ninth despite allowing a home run to Bobby Abreu. The loss marked the third time in five years (2003, 2004, and 2007) the Yankees were eliminated from a postseason series at home. This was the final postseason game ever played at the old Yankee Stadium and the last game that Joe Torre would manage for the Yankees.

=== Composite box ===
2007 ALDS (3–1): Cleveland Indians over New York Yankees

Team	1	2	3	4	5	6	7	8	9	10	11	R	H	E
Cleveland Indians	6	3	2	2	5	2	0	3	0	0	1	24	45	2
New York Yankees	1	1	2	1	5	4	1	0	1	0	0	16	31	1
Total attendance: 202,013 Average attendance: 50,503

== See also ==
- 2007 National League Division Series
- Guardians–Yankees rivalry
