= Scott Lewis (left-handed pitcher) =

American baseball player (born 1983)

- Pitcher
- Born: September 26, 1983 (age 41); West Covina, California, U.S.
- Batted: Switch Threw: Left

MLB debut
- September 10, 2008, for the Cleveland Indians

Last MLB appearance
- April 10, 2009, for the Cleveland Indians

MLB statistics
- Win–loss record: 4–0
- Earned run average: 3.49
- Strikeouts: 18
- Stats at Baseball Reference

Teams
- Cleveland Indians (2008–2009)

Scott Edwin Lewis (born September 26, 1983) is a former American starting pitcher. Lewis played college baseball at Ohio State University, threw left-handed and was a switch hitter.

== Career ==
Lewis was originally drafted by the Anaheim Angels in the 33rd round (989th overall) of the 2001 Major League Baseball draft, but chose not to sign. He was later drafted by the Cleveland Indians in the third round (77th overall) of the 2004 Major League Baseball draft.

After being drafted by Cleveland, Lewis played in Minor League Baseball as a member of the Mahoning Valley Scrappers, Kinston Indians, Akron Aeros, Buffalo Bisons, and Columbus Clippers. During the 2006 season, Lewis posted a 1.48 ERA, good enough to win the Minor League Baseball ERA title.

On September 7, 2008, Lewis was recalled from Double-A Akron as a replacement starter for Anthony Reyes. He made his first major league start against the Baltimore Orioles on September 10. In the game, he threw eight shutout innings, one shy of a complete game, allowing only three hits and no walks while striking out three batters. Lewis continued his dominance in his next start on September 15, throwing six shutout innings against the Minnesota Twins, running his scoreless innings streak to 14 to start his career. In total, Lewis started four games for the Tribe, going 4–0 with a 2.63 ERA. For his efforts, Lewis earned the American League Rookie of the Month Award for September 2008.

Lewis was slated to be a member of the Indians' starting rotation for the 2009 season, but was placed on the 15-day disabled list on April 11 with a left forearm strain. He was later transferred to the 60-day disabled list. Lewis was activated from the DL on August 17 and optioned to Triple-A Columbus. He was then outrighted off the major league roster on October 30.

Lewis began the 2010 regular season with Triple-A Columbus. He was released on May 14, 2010.
