= Jon Meloan =

American baseball player (born 1984)

- Pitcher
- Born: July 11, 1984 (age 42); Houston, Texas, U.S.
- Batted: Right Threw: Right

MLB debut
- September 1, 2007, for the Los Angeles Dodgers

Last MLB appearance
- October 3, 2009, for the Oakland Athletics

MLB statistics
- Win–loss record: 0–0
- Earned run average: 4.58
- Strikeouts: 20
- Stats at Baseball Reference

Teams
- Los Angeles Dodgers (2007); Cleveland Indians (2008); Oakland Athletics (2009)

Jonathan Michael Meloan (born July 11, 1984) is an American former pitcher in professional baseball. He played in Major League Baseball for the Los Angeles Dodgers, Cleveland Indians and Oakland Athletics.

== Early life ==
Meloan was an academic all-district honoree at James E. Taylor High School in Katy, Texas. He is also a member of the National Honor Society.

Meloan is an alumnus of the University of Arizona, where he was a perfect 10–0 in 11 starts in 2004, in leading the Wildcats to the College World Series. In three seasons with Arizona, he compiled a record of 24–4 in 30 starts. In 2003, he played collegiate summer baseball in the Cape Cod Baseball League for the Yarmouth-Dennis Red Sox.

== Professional career ==
=== Los Angeles Dodgers ===
Meloan was drafted by the Los Angeles Dodgers in the fifth round (166th overall) of the 2005 Major League Baseball draft. He made his professional debut for the Rookie-level Ogden Raptors, going 0–2 with a 3.69 ERA in 16 appearances (six starts). Primarily a starter in college, Meloan was converted to a relief pitcher at Ogden. His maximum-effort delivery and his 92–94 mph fastball with a pair of strikeout breaking balls led to his consideration as a closer.

In 2006, Meloan saw action with the Single-A Columbus Catfish, Single-A Vero Beach Dodgers and Double-A Jacksonville Suns. He posted a 3–1 record, one save and a 1.90 ERA in 21 games (one start) combined between the three teams. For the 2007 season, Meloan began the year with Double-A Jacksonville, compiling a 5–2 record with a terrific 2.18 ERA in 35 relief appearances and notching 19 saves to be selected to the Southern League All-Star team. He won the post-season "Double-A Relief Pitcher of the Year" Award. After the all-star break, he was promoted to the Triple-A Las Vegas 51s, where he went 2–0 with one save and a 1.69 ERA in 14 appearances.

Meloan was recalled to the Dodgers when the active rosters expanded on September 1, 2007. He made his Major League debut for the Dodgers that night against the San Diego Padres, working two innings of relief. He wound up pitching in five games for the Dodgers after his September call-up, working 7 1/3 innings and finishing with an 11.05 ERA.

Prior to the 2008 season, Meloan was ranked as the Dodgers' eighth-best prospect by Baseball America. He began the season with Triple-A Las Vegas, and worked out of the starting rotation, going 5–10 with a 4.97 ERA in 21 games (20 starts).

=== Cleveland Indians ===
On July 26, 2008, Meloan was traded to the Cleveland Indians along with minor league catcher Carlos Santana for infielder Casey Blake. He was sent to the Triple-A Buffalo Bisons, where he was converted back to a relief role. He went 0–1 with a 4.30 ERA in 12 relief appearances. On September 2, Meloan was recalled from Buffalo. He was not expected to appear much due to his heavy workload that year, and only made two appearances in September, tossing two scoreless innings.

In 2009, Meloan had pitched 44 innings in Triple-A for the Columbus Clippers, recording a 5.52 ERA in 25 appearances before being traded on July 2, 2009.

=== Tampa Bay Rays ===
On July 2, 2009, Meloan was traded to the Tampa Bay Rays for pitcher Winston Abreu. Meloan was designated for assignment by the Rays on August 7, 2009.

=== Pittsburgh Pirates ===
Meloan was claimed off waivers by the Pittsburgh Pirates on August 12, 2009. On August 31, 2009, he was again designated for assignment.

=== Oakland Athletics ===
On September 2, 2009, Meloan was claimed off waivers by the Oakland Athletics. He was recalled on September 19, after pitching for the Triple-A Sacramento River Cats in the postseason. Meloan made six relief appearances with Oakland to close out the season, allowing one unearned run in 8 1/3 innings while striking out 11 batters.

Meloan missed the entire 2010 season due to Tommy John surgery. After the season, he was outrighted to Triple-A Sacramento on October 30. The Athletics released Meloan in October 2011.

=== Remainder of career ===
Meloan agreed to sign with the Texas Rangers on March 3, 2012, but the Rangers released Meloan on March 31, before he could play a game in the organization.

Meloan started the 2012 season with the independent Long Island Ducks, going 4–0 with 11 saves and an ERA of 0.99 in 23 relief appearances. The New York Yankees signed Meloan in June 2012. He then returned to the Long Island Ducks in 2014.
