= Rich Rundles =

American baseball player (1981–2019)

- Relief pitcher
- Born: June 3, 1981; Chattanooga, Tennessee, U.S.
- Died: December 16, 2019 (aged 38); Livingston, Alabama, U.S.
- Batted: Left Threw: Left

MLB debut
- September 3, 2008, for the Cleveland Indians

Last MLB appearance
- May 25, 2009, for the Cleveland Indians

MLB statistics
- Win–loss record: 0–0
- Earned run average: 1.50
- Strikeouts: 7
- Stats at Baseball Reference

Teams
- Cleveland Indians (2008–2009)

Richard Lambert Rundles (June 3, 1981 – December 16, 2019) was an American Major League Baseball (MLB) relief pitcher who played for the Cleveland Indians in 2008 and 2009. From 1999 to 2012, Rundles played in minor league baseball with the Boston Red Sox, Montreal Expos, Washington Nationals, St. Louis Cardinals, New York Mets, Cleveland Indians and Baltimore Orioles organizations.

Through 1,027 1/3 minor-league innings, Rundles compiled a 3.34 ERA. A pitcher with good control, he was drafted out of high school by the Boston Red Sox in the third round (88th overall) of the 1999 Major League Baseball draft. In 2001, Rundles pitched in Single-A for the Augusta GreenJackets and Clinton LumberKings, going 8–7 with a 2.41 ERA in 23 starts. In 142 innings, he walked 13 while striking out 114 in 132 innings. Various injuries stalled his development until he signed with the Cleveland Indians as a minor-league free agent on February 12, 2007. The Tribe moved Rundles to the bullpen in an attempt to avoid his durability issues.

Sent to the Double-A Akron Aeros in 2007, Rundles went 3–0 with a 1.83 ERA and two saves in 23 games (two starts). That earned him his first call to Triple-A, where he was 2–4 with a 2.70 ERA in 17 relief outings with the Triple-A Buffalo Bisons. Rundles then went to the 2007 Arizona Fall League to continue his transition to relief. He allowed one run in 8 2/3 innings (1.04 ERA) over eight outings.

On July 2, 2008, Rundles was named to the 2008 Triple-A All-Star Game as the lone representative of the Bisons. He was called up to the majors on September 1, 2008, and made his major league debut on September 3. He faced one batter, allowing a walk to Jim Thome before being pulled. Rundles appeared in eight games for the Tribe that season, compiling a 1.80 ERA. He had a total of six strikeouts, three walks, and gave up one earned run through five innings of work from the bullpen.

Rundles was sent to the Triple-A Columbus Clippers on March 15, 2009. He spent most of the 2009 season with Columbus, going 2–2 with one save and a 4.75 ERA in 45 relief appearances. He made one appearance with Cleveland on May 25, pitching the fourth inning against the Tampa Bay Rays and allowing two inherited runners to score.

On January 26, 2010, Rundles signed with the St. Louis Cardinals. He spent the following two seasons pitching for the Triple-A Memphis Redbirds.

Rundles signed with the Lancaster Barnstormers of the Atlantic League of Professional Baseball for the 2012 season. He made eight starts with Lancaster, finishing 2–1 with a 3.02 ERA and striking out 40 batters in 47 2/3 innings. On June 7, 2012, the Baltimore Orioles purchased Rundles' contract from the Barnstormers. The Orioles released him in April 2013.

In nine career MLB games, Rundles worked six innings and allowed six hits and four walks while striking out seven batters. He had a lifetime 1.50 ERA and a 1.667 WHIP.

On January 28, 2014, Rundles was named pitching coach for the Barnstormers, holding that position from 2014 to 2016. In the fall of 2017, he was named the pitching coach for the University of West Alabama baseball team, joining his father, head baseball coach Gary Rundles.

Rundles died on December 16, 2019, from natural causes at the age of 38.
