= Casey Blake =

American baseball player (born 1973)

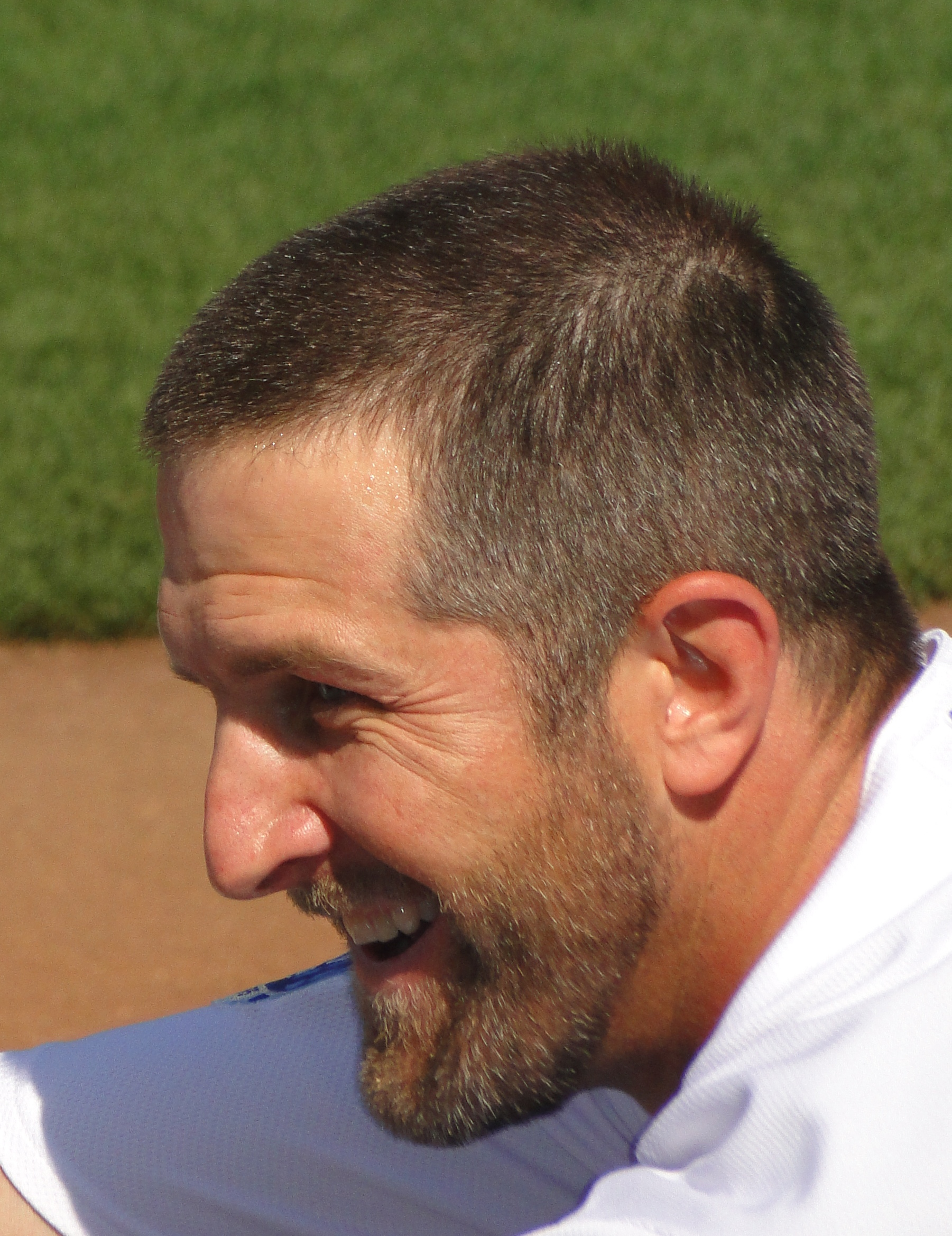
- Third baseman
- Born: August 23, 1973 (age 53); Des Moines, Iowa, U.S.
- Batted: Right Threw: Right

MLB debut
- August 14, 1999, for the Toronto Blue Jays

Last MLB appearance
- August 31, 2011, for the Los Angeles Dodgers

MLB statistics
- Batting average: .264
- Home runs: 167
- Runs batted in: 616
- Stats at Baseball Reference

Teams
- Toronto Blue Jays (1999); Minnesota Twins (2000–2001); Baltimore Orioles (2001); Minnesota Twins (2002); Cleveland Indians (2003–2008); Los Angeles Dodgers (2008–2011)

William Casey Blake (born August 23, 1973) is an American former professional baseball third baseman. He played in Major League Baseball (MLB) for the Toronto Blue Jays, Minnesota Twins, Baltimore Orioles, Cleveland Indians, and Los Angeles Dodgers. He had alternated between playing at third base and first base before becoming a full-time third baseman with the Indians. In 2005, Blake moved to right field to accommodate the Indians' signing of third baseman Aaron Boone, and stayed there for two seasons before moving back to third base.

Blake was drafted twice prior to signing with the Blue Jays: in 1992, he was selected in the 11th round (305th overall) by the Philadelphia Phillies and in 1995, he was taken by the New York Yankees during the 45th round (1,259th overall).

== High school and college ==
Blake was a four-sport standout at Indianola High School in Indianola, Iowa, where he played baseball, football, basketball, and participated in track. He was named one of the top ten high school athletes in the history of Iowa.

Blake attended Wichita State University, where he was a three-time All-American, two-time Academic All-American and participated in the College World Series. He batted .320 with 22 home runs and 101 RBI during his senior year. In 1993, he played collegiate summer baseball with the Hyannis Mets of the Cape Cod Baseball League.

== Professional career ==
=== Toronto Blue Jays ===
Blake was selected by the Toronto Blue Jays in the seventh round (189th overall) of the 1996 Major League Baseball draft. From 1996–2002, Blake spent most of his time in the minor leagues. In the Blue Jays' minor league system, he played for the Hagerstown Suns (1996), Dunedin Blue Jays (1997–98), Knoxville Smokies (1998), St. Catharines Stompers (1999) and Syracuse SkyChiefs (1999–2000). Blake made his major league debut on August 14, 1999, against the Oakland Athletics at third base, and finished the game 0-for-3. He recorded his first career hit with a fifth-inning single off John Burkett on August 29 against the Texas Rangers. Blake finished the game 2-for-3 in Toronto's 4–2 loss. On October 2, he hit his first career home run against the Cleveland Indians (off pitcher Jim Brower). Blake played in 14 games with Toronto in 1999, batting .256 with a home run and RBI.

=== Minnesota Twins ===
On May 23, 2000, the Minnesota Twins claimed Blake off waivers and assigned him to the Triple-A Salt Lake Buzz. He played primarily at Triple-A in the Minnesota organization with Salt Lake (2000) and the Edmonton Trappers (2001–02). He appeared in seven games with the Twins in 2000, and 13 in 2001.

=== Baltimore Orioles ===
Blake was claimed off waivers by the Baltimore Orioles on September 21, 2001. Blake appeared in only six games with the Orioles at the end of the season, batting .133 with a home run and 2 RBI.

=== Minnesota Twins ===
On October 12, 2001, Blake was again claimed off waivers by the Twins. He played in nine games with Minnesota in 2002, batting .200 with an RBI. Blake spent the majority of the season with Triple-A Edmonton, batting .309 with 19 home runs and 58 RBI in 126 games.

=== Cleveland Indians ===
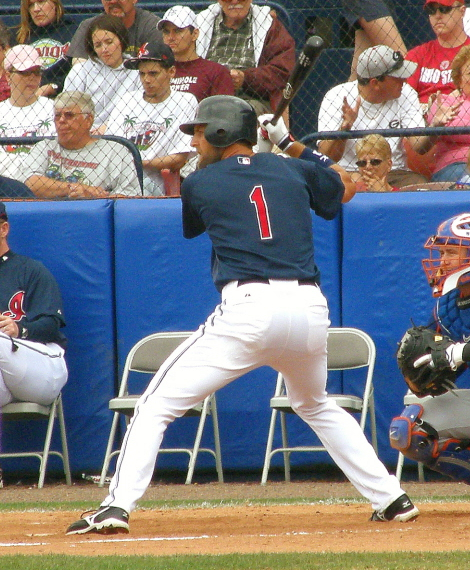
Blake batting for the Cleveland Indians in 2008 spring training.

On December 18, 2002, Blake signed with the Cleveland Indians as a free agent. In 2003, Blake became the Indians' everyday third baseman in his first full season in the major leagues. He led the team in games played (152), hits (143), and doubles (35) while compiling career highs in every offensive category. Blake started in every spot in the batting order except the leadoff spot, the most common slot being the #2 hole in the lineup. He had a fielding percentage of .952. Blake was named AL Player of the Week of June 30–July 6, and hit .375 with three doubles, four home runs and an-MLB best 14 RBI for the week. He ended the season with 17 home runs, 67 RBI, and a .257 batting average in 152 games played.

In 2004, Blake had his finest offensive season to date in his second straight full season in the major leagues as the Indians' third baseman. In June, he hit .330 (37-for-112) with seven home runs and 21 RBI in 28 games. From June 1 through the end the season, he hit .283, with 22 home runs and 68 RBI in 112 games. He had an AL-low fielding percentage of .939 at third base and led the majors at that position with 26 errors. He finished the season with a .271 batting average, 28 home runs, and 88 RBI in 152 games.

Blake signed a two-year contract to avoid arbitration on January 21, 2005. In 2005, Blake converted to right field and filled in at third base and first base. He had 56 extra base hits. Blake made 133 starts in right field, six at third base and four starts at first. In the outfield, he made eight errors in 298 total chances. In 2005, Blake ended the season with a .241 average, 23 home runs, 58 RBI and 116 strikeouts in 147 games. He batted just .171 with runners in scoring position.

In 2006, Blake once again was the Indians' starting right fielder. He started the season strong, batting .304 with 10 home runs and 36 RBI through June 15, when it was announced that he would be placed on the disabled list with a left oblique strain. On July 13, Blake was activated from the disabled list. Blake ended the season with a career-high .282 batting average, 19 home runs, and 68 RBI in 109 games.

Andy Marte's demotion to Triple-A resulted in Blake taking over once again as the Indians' starting third baseman in 2007. Blake had a 26-game hit streak from May 20 through June 18 during which he hit .317 with seven home runs. On July 3, Blake hit a game-winning solo home run in the top of the 11th against the Detroit Tigers, giving Cleveland a 5–4 win and a three-game lead over Detroit.

As the Indians drove for a playoff spot, Blake hit a walk-off home run against the Kansas City Royals on September 14. Three days later (again facing the Tigers), Blake hit another walk-off home run, all but ending the Tigers' Central Division title hopes. He finished the season batting .270 with 18 home runs and 78 RBI in 156 games. The Indians won the American League Central, marking Blake's first time appearing in the postseason. In Game 1 of the 2007 American League Division Series, Blake hit a two-run double off New York Yankees pitcher Ross Ohlendorf, helping Cleveland to a decisive 12–3 win. Blake struggled in the series, hitting just .118, but the Indians went on to win the series in four games. His bat heated up in the 2007 American League Championship Series, as he batted .346 with two doubles, a home run, a walk and 2 RBI. The Indians, however, went on to lose the series to the Boston Red Sox in seven games.

Blake began the 2008 season batting .289 with 11 home runs and 58 RBI in 94 games with Cleveland.

=== Los Angeles Dodgers ===
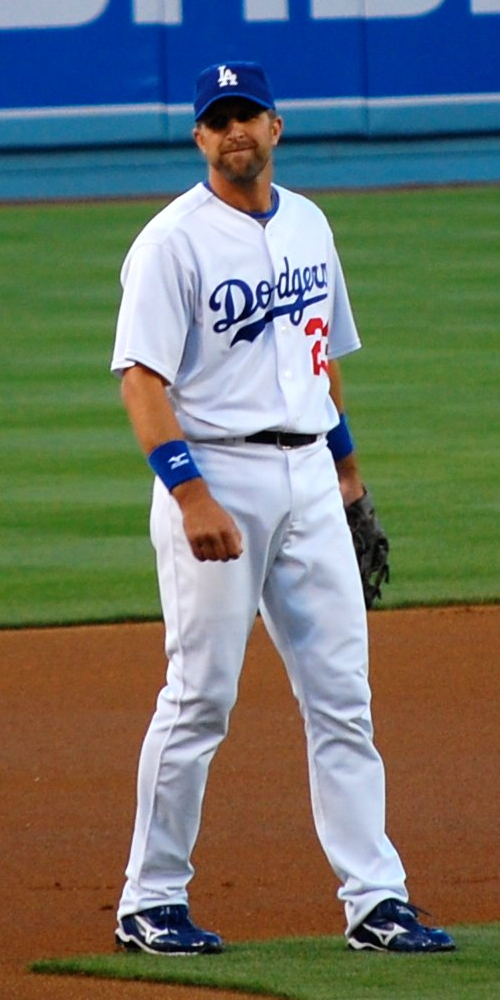
Blake in 2009.

On July 26, 2008, Blake was traded from the Indians to the Los Angeles Dodgers for minor league players Carlos Santana and Jon Meloan. He went 2-for-3 with a double and a run scored in his debut with the Dodgers on July 26. He hit his first home run with the Dodgers on August 2 against the Arizona Diamondbacks. Blake hit .251 with 10 home runs and 23 RBI in 58 games with the Dodgers. In the 2008 postseason, Blake batted .267 with a home run and 4 RBI in eight games, helping the Dodgers to the 2008 National League Championship Series, where they lost in five games to the Philadelphia Phillies.

On December 9, 2008, Blake signed a three-year extension with the Dodgers worth a guaranteed $17.5 million. In 2009, he hit .280 with 18 home runs and 79 RBI in 139 games. His .973 fielding percentage was the best all-time in a season for a Dodger third baseman. Blake hit just .167 with 2 RBI in the 2009 postseason, including a .105 mark in the 2009 National League Championship Series, which the Dodgers lost again in five games to the Phillies.

In 2010, Blake hit .248, his lowest average since 2005, with 17 home runs and 64 RBI in 146 games.

Due to various injuries, Blake was only able to appear in 63 games for the Dodgers in 2011, hitting .252 with only four home runs (his lowest total since 2002) with 26 RBI. On September 1, he decided to undergo season-ending surgery on his neck to relieve the pain from a pinched nerve that had bothered him all season.

On October 4, 2011, the Dodgers declined Blake's 2012 option, instead paying him a buyout of $1.25 million and making him a free agent.

=== Colorado Rockies ===
On December 20, 2011, Blake agreed to a one-year, $2 million contract with the Colorado Rockies. He passed his physical and signed the deal on January 5, 2012. However, he was released before the end of Spring Training on March 27. Blake announced his retirement on May 8, 2012.

== Personal life ==
Blake splits time between Indianola, Iowa and Los Angeles, California with his wife, four daughters and a son. When asked about his beard, he answers that he grows it simply because he does not like to shave. The beard also helps camouflage him while participating in one of his favorite hobbies, duck hunting. Blake and his wife began a foundation which donated well over $1,000,000 to the Indianola school district to build the district's athletic, academic and fine arts programs.
