= Jensen Lewis =

American baseball player (born 1984)

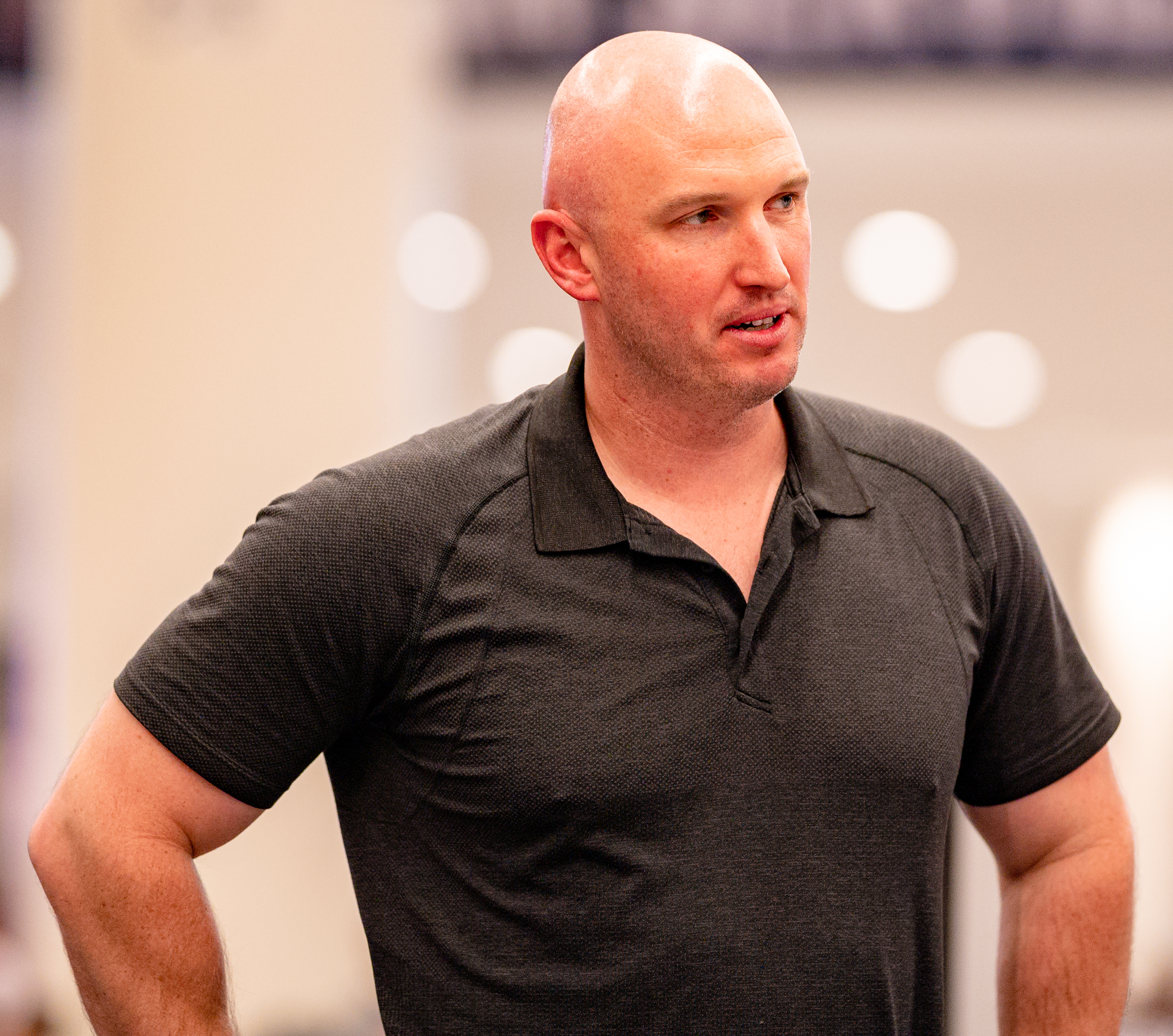
- Lewis in February 2020
- Pitcher
- Born: May 16, 1984 (age 42); Cincinnati, Ohio, U.S.
- Batted: Right Threw: Right

MLB debut
- July 16, 2007, for the Cleveland Indians

Last MLB appearance
- October 1, 2010, for the Cleveland Indians

MLB statistics
- Win–loss record: 7–11
- Earned run average: 3.68
- Strikeouts: 177
- Stats at Baseball Reference

Teams
- Cleveland Indians (2007–2010)

Jensen Daniel Lewis (born May 16, 1984) is an American former Major League Baseball pitcher who played for the Cleveland Indians from 2007 to 2010 and is currently a baseball analyst with Bally Sports.

== Career ==
=== Amateur ===
Lewis was originally drafted out of high school by the Cleveland Indians in the 33rd round (994th overall) of the 2002 Major League Baseball draft, but chose not to sign in order to play college baseball at Vanderbilt University. In 2003 and 2004, he played collegiate summer baseball with the Falmouth Commodores of the Cape Cod Baseball League, where he was named a league all-star in 2004.

=== Cleveland Indians ===
In the 2005 MLB draft, Lewis was again selected by Cleveland in the third round (102nd overall). He made his professional debut that year for the Single-A Mahoning Valley Scrappers, going 4–2 with a 3.20 ERA in 13 games (11 starts). Lewis then moved up to the Single-A Kinston Indians in 2006, and had continued success, posting a 7–6 record, a 3.99 ERA, and 94 strikeouts in 108 1/3 innings pitched across 21 games (20 starts). He earned a promotion to the Double-A Akron Aeros to close the season, where he was 1–2 with a 3.89 ERA in seven starts.

After spending the first half of the 2007 season with Akron and the Triple-A Buffalo Bisons, Lewis was called up to the Indians on July 13, 2007. He made his Major League Baseball debut against the Chicago White Sox on July 16, tossing 1 1/3 scoreless innings while allowing three walks and striking out two. Lewis would earn his first big league victory throwing three scoreless innings of relief against the Detroit Tigers on September 18. He finished the season 1–1 with a 2.15 ERA in 26 relief appearances. In the 2007 postseason, Lewis recorded a 4.70 ERA in seven appearances.

Lewis started the 2008 season with an 0–2 record and a 3.82 ERA through June 3. He was optioned to Triple-A Buffalo the next day, with the goal of building up his velocity. Lewis returned on July 4, and served as the Indians' closer in August and September, converting all 13 of his save opportunities. In 51 relief appearances with Cleveland, he was 0–4 with 13 saves and a 3.82 ERA.

The 2009 season was difficult for Lewis, as he finished 2–4 with one save and a 4.61 ERA in 47 relief appearances. He also spent time with the Triple-A Columbus Clippers, going 1–0 in 12 scoreless appearances.

On July 20, 2010, Lewis was designated for assignment to make room for Asdrúbal Cabrera on the active roster. On July 21, Lewis was placed back on the 40-man roster and optioned to Triple-A Columbus. After making two appearances in August, Lewis returned to Cleveland for the rest of the season in September. Overall, he went 4–2 with a 2.97 ERA in 37 appearances at the major league level in 2010.

After a difficult 2011 spring training in which he allowed 10 runs (nine earned) on 13 hits in 5 2/3 innings, Lewis was outrighted to Columbus on March 22. He was released on June 24, after recording a 5.14 ERA in 28 innings while with Columbus.

=== Arizona Diamondbacks ===
On November 21, 2011, Lewis signed a minor league contract with the Arizona Diamondbacks. He spent the 2012 season with the Reno Aces, the Diamondbacks' Triple-A affiliate. In 52 relief appearances, Lewis was 7–2 with four saves and a 3.65 ERA. He became a free agent following the season on November 2.

=== Chicago Cubs ===
On December 7, 2012, Lewis signed a minor league contract with the Chicago Cubs. He was released on April 19, 2013, after struggling in five games with the Triple-A Iowa Cubs.

=== Sports analyst ===
From 2015 to 2024, Lewis served as the pregame/postgame analyst for Cleveland Guardians games on SportsTime Ohio (now Bally Sports Great Lakes). He has three Lower Great Lakes Emmy Awards to his credit as part of the Guardians Live pregame/postgame show.

In 2025, Lewis became a co-host and analyst for sports betting network Vegas Stats & Information Network.
