= Rafael Betancourt =

Venezuelan baseball player (born 1975)

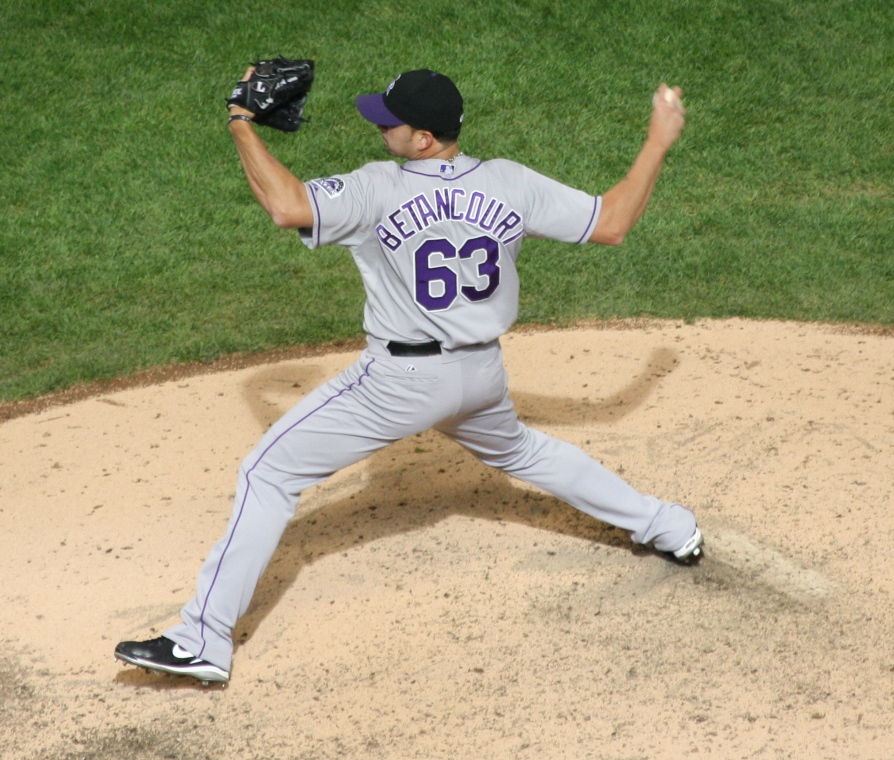
- Betancourt with the Colorado Rockies in 2012
- Pitcher
- Born: April 29, 1975 (age 51); Cumaná, Sucre State, Venezuela
- Batted: Right Threw: Right

Professional debut
- NPB: June 10, 2000, for the Yokohama BayStars
- MLB: July 13, 2003, for the Cleveland Indians

Last appearance
- NPB: August 17, 2000, for the Yokohama BayStars
- MLB: August 22, 2015, for the Colorado Rockies

NPB statistics
- Win–loss record: 1–2
- Earned run average: 4.08
- Strikeouts: 16

MLB statistics
- Win–loss record: 38–37
- Earned run average: 3.36
- Strikeouts: 724
- Stats at Baseball Reference

Teams
- Yokohama BayStars (2000); Cleveland Indians (2003–2009); Colorado Rockies (2009–2013, 2015)

Rafael José Betancourt (born April 29, 1975) is a Venezuelan former professional baseball relief pitcher. He played in Major League Baseball (MLB) for the Cleveland Indians and Colorado Rockies, as well as in Nippon Professional Baseball (NPB) for the Yokohama BayStars.

== Career ==
=== Boston Red Sox/Yokohama BayStars ===
Betancourt was originally signed as an amateur free agent by the Boston Red Sox on September 13, 1993. The Red Sox released him following the 1999 season and then re-signed him as a free agent in December 2000 after he spent the 2000 season with the Yokohama BayStars of Nippon Professional Baseball. He was granted free agency again in October 2001, after serving the required time to acquire free agency.

=== Cleveland Indians ===
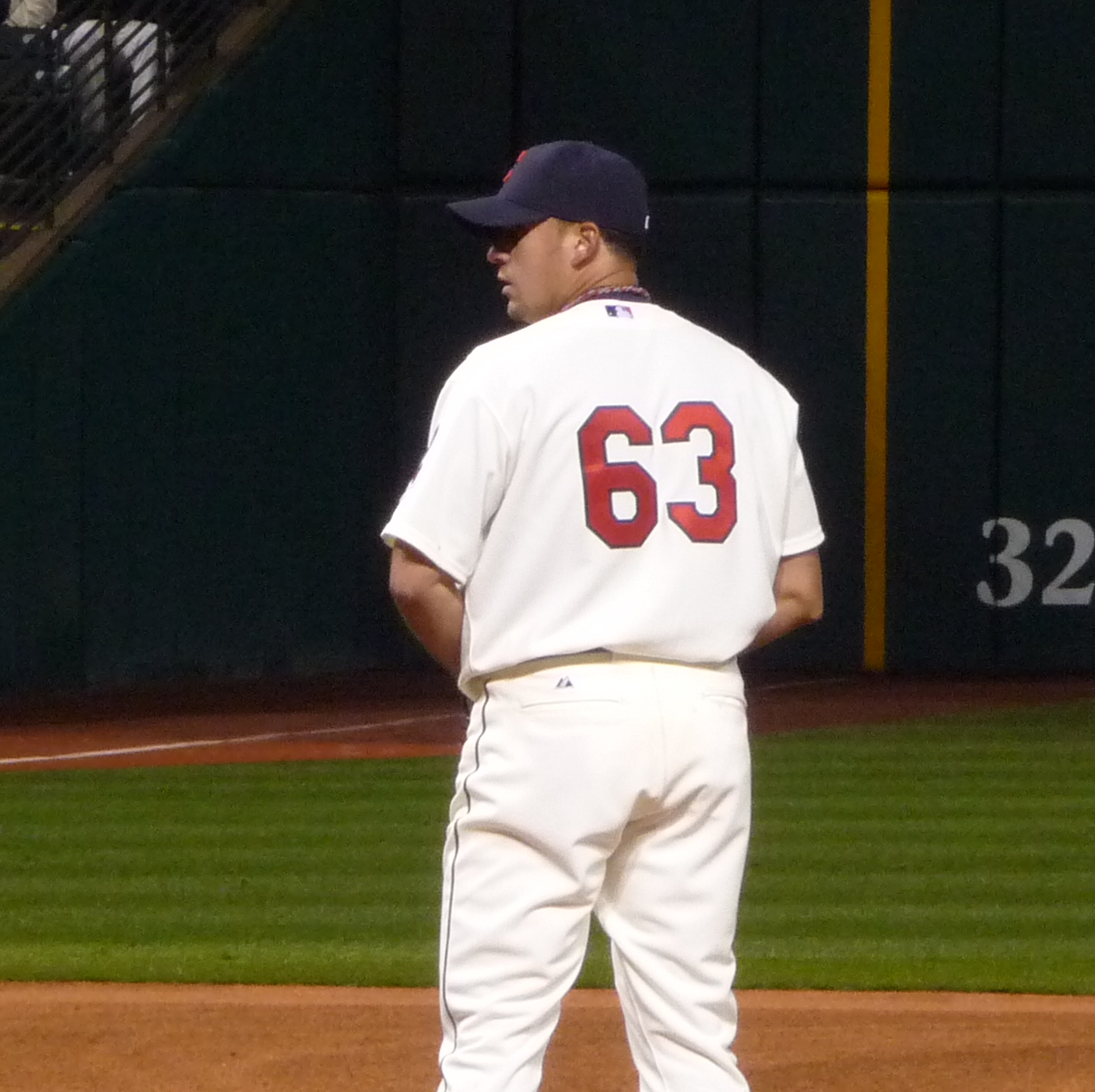
Pitching with the Indians in 2009

After sitting out the 2002 season due to right elbow surgery, Betancourt signed with the Cleveland Indians as a minor league free agent on February 6, 2003. He began the season with the Double-A Akron Aeros, making 31 appearances and posting a 1.39 ERA, 16 saves and 75 strikeouts in 45 1/3 innings. Betancourt was soon promoted to the Triple-A Buffalo Bisons, where he recorded one save and a 4.05 ERA in four games. On July 12, the Indians purchased Betancourt's contract, and he made his Major League debut for the Indians the next day against the Chicago White Sox. In the game, he tossed 1 1/3 innings, giving up an earned run while walking one and striking out one. Betancourt pitched in 33 games for the Indians in 2003, going 2–2 with one save and an ERA of 2.13.

In 2004, Betancourt spent the entire season with the Indians, finishing 5–6 with four saves and a 3.92 ERA in 68 relief appearances.

On July 8, 2005, Betancourt became the sixth Major League player to be suspended for testing positive in steroids testing. He went on to appear in 54 games, posting a 4–3 record, one save and a 2.79 ERA.

In 2006, Betancourt's ERA grew a full run higher than his previous season. He finished with a 3–4 record, three saves and a 3.81 ERA in 50 relief appearances. Betancourt's best season was in 2007, as he finished 5–1 with three saves and a 1.47 ERA in 68 relief appearances. He registered career bests in ERA, innings pitched (79 1/3), WHIP (0.76), and walks allowed (9).

On January 23, 2008, Betancourt signed a new two-year contract with the Indians worth $5.4 million guaranteed. The deal also included a $5 million club option for 2010. His success from 2007 did not carry over to 2008, as he finished 3–4 with four saves and a 5.07 ERA in 69 relief appearances. In 2009, Betancourt began the season 1–2 with one save and a 3.52 ERA in 29 games.

=== Colorado Rockies ===
On July 23, 2009, Betancourt was traded to the Colorado Rockies for minor league pitcher Connor Graham. He made 32 relief appearances with the Rockies to finish the season, going 3–1 with one save and a 1.78 ERA. His $5 million club option was declined at the end of the season, making him a free agent. Betancourt qualified as a Type A free agent, and was offered arbitration by the Rockies.

On December 7, 2009, Betancourt accepted the arbitration offer from the Rockies, returning to the team from free agency. In his first full season in Colorado, he finished 5–1 with one save and a 3.61 ERA in 72 games. Betancourt improved on those numbers in 2011, going 2–0 with eight saves and a 2.89 ERA in 68 relief appearances.

After numerous seasons being a set up man, Betancourt was named the Rockies' closer prior to the 2012 season. On January 25, he signed a two-year, $8.5 million contract extension with the Rockies that included an option for 2014. Betancourt saved 31 games as closer, and posted a 1–4 record with a 2.81 ERA in 60 relief appearances.

Betancourt made 32 relief appearances in 2013, going 2–5 with 16 saves and a 4.08 ERA. On August 22, he suffered a season-ending injury to his right elbow. Eight days later, it was announced that Betancourt would undergo Tommy John surgery to repair the ulnar collateral ligament in his right elbow. Despite concerns that the injury may end his career, manager Walt Weiss stated that Betancourt would continue pitching. On October 29, the Rockies declined his option for 2014, making him a free agent.

On April 25, 2014, Betancourt signed a new minor league deal with the Rockies. He spent the season rehabbing from surgery and did not make an appearance in the majors.

On January 30, 2015, Betancourt signed a minor league contract to remain with the Rockies. He made his return to the Rockies' bullpen on April 6, tossing a scoreless inning while striking out two in Colorado's 10–0 win over the Milwaukee Brewers. On August 23, Betancourt was designated for assignment. At the time, he was 2–4 with one save a 6.18 ERA in 45 relief appearances. Betancourt was released by the Rockies on August 27.

Betancourt announced his retirement from baseball on February 26, 2016.

== Pitching style ==
Betancourt's best pitches were a 90–94 MPH four-seam fastball, and a slider which was often mistakenly called a slurve. He also threw a changeup. Although he was not classified as a strikeout pitcher, Betancourt got more than his share by throwing a significant number of strikes. He was a converted shortstop with a metal plate and six screws in his pitching elbow.

Betancourt was known in some circles for his odd windup. He constantly tapped his foot on the rubber before coming set with a runner on base. He would constantly move his hands around and then tug on his baseball cap (sometimes doing it nine times) prior to throwing the next pitch. This was among the longest windups in the league. There is a rule to avoid unnecessary delays which states that if a pitcher takes at least 12 seconds to deliver a pitch, the pitch is automatically ruled a ball. Betancourt was one of the few pitchers who have had this rule enforced while pitching.

== See also ==
- List of sportspeople sanctioned for doping offenses
- List of Major League Baseball players from Venezuela
