= 2007 Cleveland Indians season =

2007 Cleveland Indians
- American League Central champions
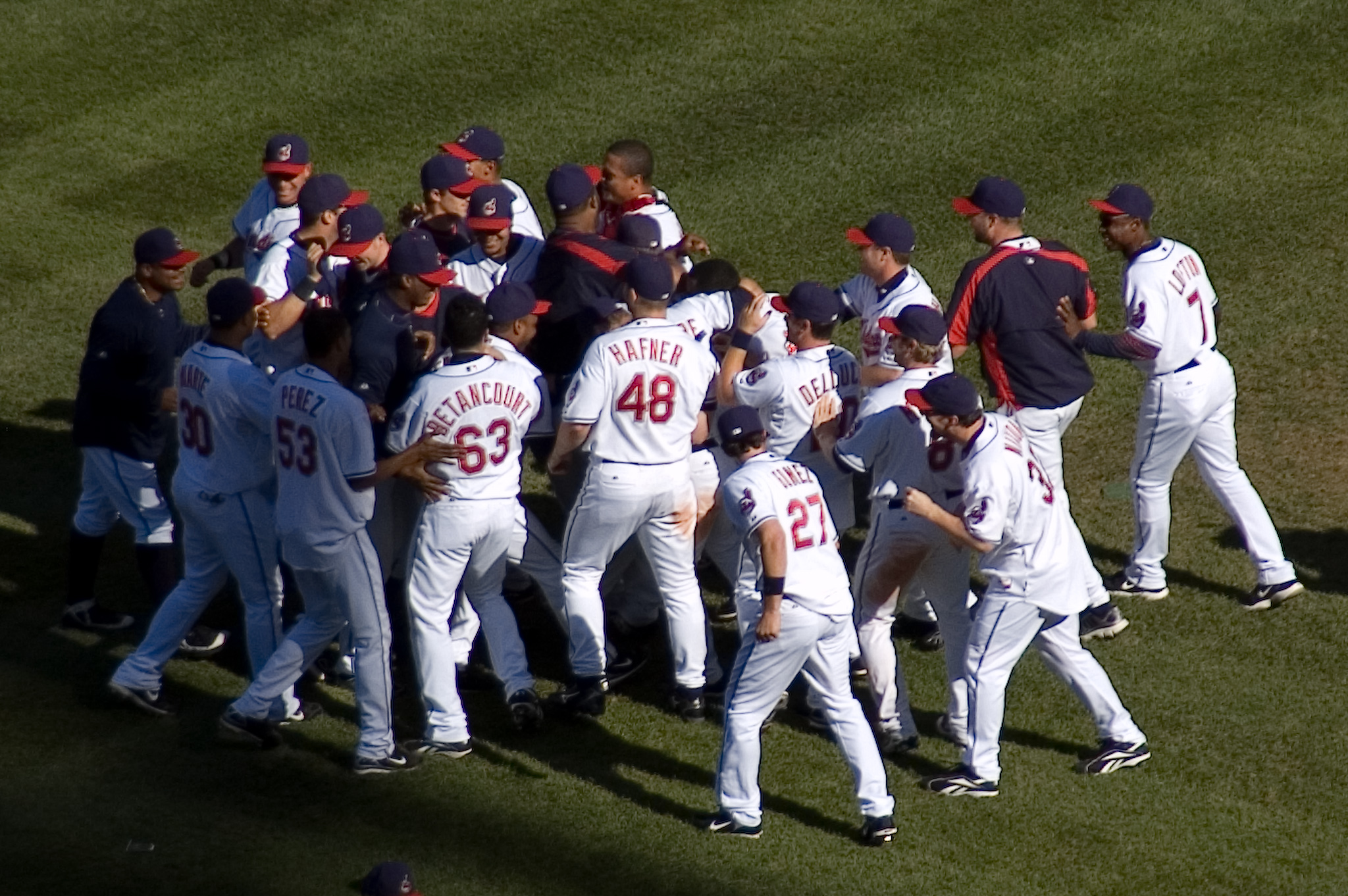
- The Indians celebrate clinching the AL Central crown
- League: American League
- Division: Central
- Ballpark: Jacobs Field
- City: Cleveland
- Record: 96–66 (.593)
- Divisional place: 1st
- Owners: Larry Dolan
- General managers: Mark Shapiro
- Managers: Eric Wedge
- Television: SportsTime Ohio (Matt Underwood, Rick Manning, Al Pawlowski, Brian Anderson); WKYC (Jim Donovan, Rick Manning)
- Radio: WTAM · WMMS; Cleveland Indians Radio Network (Tom Hamilton, Jim Rosenhaus, Mike Hegan)

The 2007 Cleveland Indians season was the 107th season for the franchise. The Indians won the American League Central title for the first time since 2001 on September 23, 2007, with a win over the Oakland Athletics. They played for the American League title before losing to the Boston Red Sox in seven games.

To prepare for 2007, Indians General Manager Mark Shapiro signed relievers Aaron Fultz, Joe Borowski, and Roberto Hernández to fix a bullpen that had the fewest saves (and most blown saves) in 2006. He also traded third baseman Kevin Kouzmanoff for second baseman Josh Barfield. On January 2, Luis Rivas was signed as a free agent with the Cleveland Indians.

== Regular season ==
=== Season summary ===
The Indians began the 2007 season on the road in Chicago for a three-game series with the White Sox. The lineup supplied plenty of offense as the Indians won the first two games of the series. Grady Sizemore hit three home runs in the series, but the White Sox won the third game, leaving the Indians with a record of 2–1 as they head home.

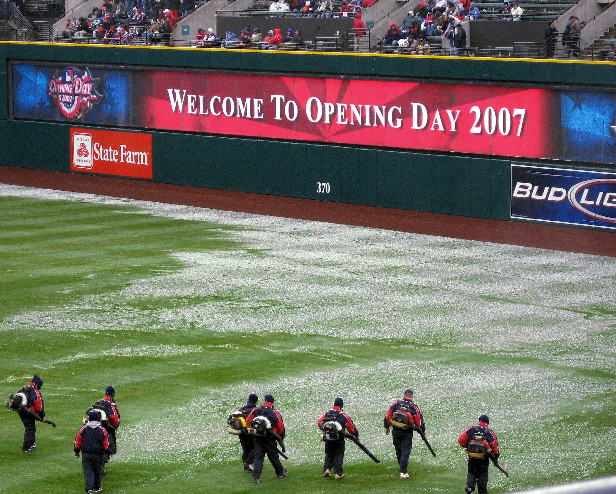
The 2007 home opener at Jacobs Field

However, their home opener, as well as the remainder of a four-game series with the Seattle Mariners, was postponed due to heavy snow. After a discussion about a possible relocation of the following series between the Indians and the Angels to Anaheim, the Indians decided to relocate the three-game series to Miller Park in Milwaukee. The three-game series averaged a surprising 17,498 fans in attendance, and featured several homages to the fact that the film Major League was shot in Milwaukee, including closer Joe Borowski entering the game to "Wild Thing".

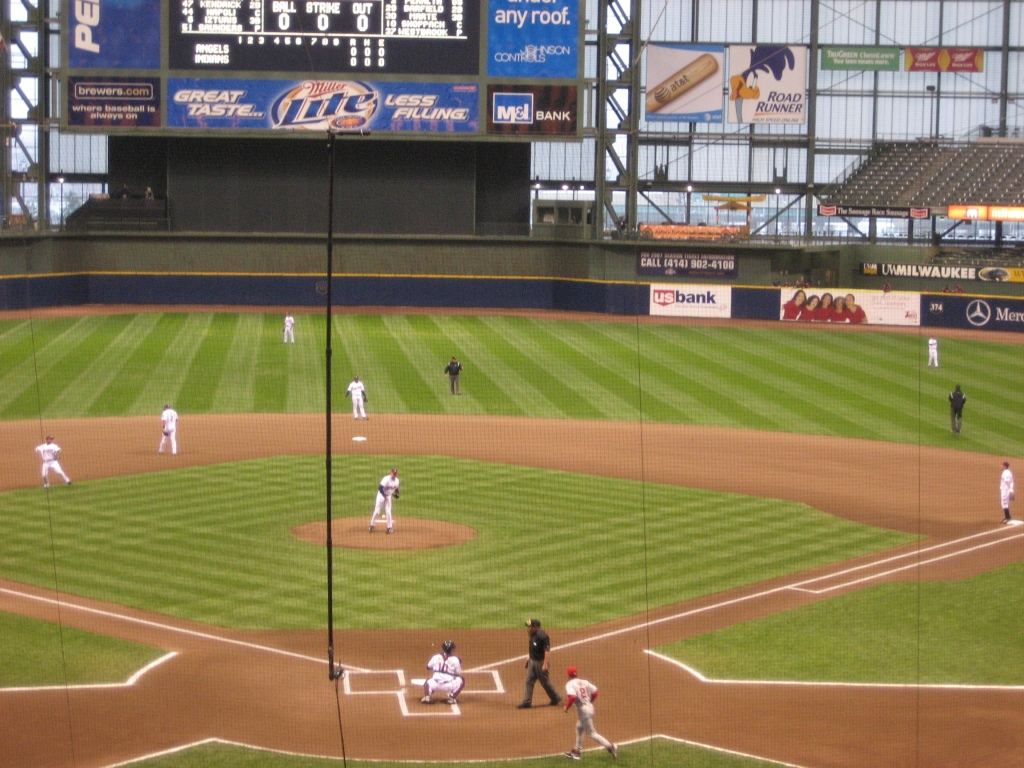
The Indians and Angels at Miller Park in Milwaukee

In that series, the Indians got a solid outing by CC Sabathia, and although the Angels roughed up the bullpen, closer Joe Borowski held on in the 9th inning to give the Indians a 7–6 victory. Angels' pitcher Joe Saunders dominated the second game, and the Angels won 4–1. In the final game of the series, Travis Hafner hit a 3-run home run in the bottom of the 8th inning to put the Indians ahead 4–2 for a comeback win.

On April 13, the Indians announced they had signed starter Jake Westbrook to a three-year contract extension. Westbrook would have been eligible for free agency at the end of the season.

On April 28, the Indians had a six-game winning streak snapped in part because of a rare scoring decision. The umpires retroactively added a run to the Baltimore Orioles' score three innings after the play had occurred. Manager Eric Wedge immediately appealed the decision to the MLB commissioner's office. The game will remain as originally played, as the commissioner's office has upheld the umpire's decision. The Indians won the following game to end the month of April with a 14–8 record, having won seven of their last eight games.

The Indians continued their fast start into May, with a three-game sweep of the Blue Jays at home. They struggled on the ensuing road trip, however, going 4–6 against the Orioles, Angels, and Athletics, including a game in which the Indians led the Athletics 7–5 going into the bottom of the 9th. The bullpen gave up home runs to Milton Bradley and Jack Cust and went on to lose 10–7.

However, when they returned to Jacobs Field, the Indians got hot again, going 6–1 against the Twins, Reds, and Mariners. After a series loss to the Royals on the road, the Indians swept the contending Tigers at Comerica Park, and went on to finish 19–11 in the month of May.

June began memorably for the Indians, when in the bottom of the 9th inning, they rallied from a 4-run deficit to defeat the Tigers 12–11 in front of a near-capacity crowd at Jacobs Field. Entering interleague play, however, the Indians began to struggle, losing a series on the road to the last place Reds, at home to the Braves and to the last-place Nationals. They had a mediocre 9–9 record in interleague play, but finished the month strong by taking three of four from the Athletics, and sweeping a 4-game set from the Devil Rays, and went 15–11 in June, still in first place over the Detroit Tigers. Named to the All Star team this month were Víctor Martínez, CC Sabathia and Grady Sizemore.

July started with a critical away series against the Tigers with first place on the line. Starting the series with a two-game lead, they won the first game. However, they lost the next two games as well as dropped 2 out of 3 to Toronto to reach the All-Star break 1 game behind Detroit.

The Indians sent 3 players to the 2007 All Star game in San Francisco. CC Sabathia pitched one inning, in which he gave up 1 hit and 0 runs. Grady Sizemore went 0–1 with a strikeout and played the both left and center field during the late innings. Victor Martinez came into the game right after Sizemore's at bat to pinch hit for the pitcher, and hit a 2-run homer that gave the A.L. a 5–2 lead in the 8th inning. This home run proved to be the game winner as the American League defeated the National League 5–4.

After the All-Star Break, the Indians went 3–3 on their homestand with the Royals and White Sox. After taking 3 of 4 from the Rangers on the road, Cleveland went into a slump, losing the next three series' at home to the Red Sox, Twins, and Rangers, going 3–7 overall. On July 27, the Indians traded catcher Max Ramirez to the Texas Rangers for OF Kenny Lofton. Lofton played later that night and went 3–5 with 1 RBI.

On the ensuing road trip, Cleveland's play improved, going 5–4 against the Twins and White Sox. When they returned home, however, the Indians went into another slide. They were swept for the second time in the season by the New York Yankees, and fell out of first place. But on the next road trip, Cleveland began to play much better, winning series' against the Devil Rays, Tigers, and Royals. They finished the trip 6–3 and took a two-and-a-half-game lead for the AL Central. A key factor for the Tribe was replacing Josh Barfield at second base with rookie Asdrúbal Cabrera. The Indians pressed their Central Division advantage by sweeping Minnesota at home, beating Seattle at home in a make-up game, and winning the first of a three-game series at home against the White Sox.

Cleveland started September in the middle of a stretch of 23 games in 23 days due to adjustments for the snowed-out games in April. They won the series with the White Sox that started in August two games to one, then, on the road, proceeded to beat Johan Santana of the Twins for the fifth time in the same season. The Indians went on to sweep the Twins, then split a four-game series in Anaheim against the Angels and take two out of three from the White Sox in Chicago, making the Tribe 7–3 on the road trip and 17–6 over the long stretch. The Indians took two of three from Kansas City to start the last home stand of the regular season, winning the first game on a ninth-inning walk-off home run by Casey Blake. The last series of the year against the Tigers started off dramatically with a come from behind win in extra innings, again with a walk-off home run by Casey Blake. The Indians would go on to sweep the series and bring their lead in the Central Division up to 7 1/2 games once again, essentially ending Detroit's hopes of a playoff berth. The Indians clinched the Central Division title on September 23, 2007. It was their first playoff berth since 2001. The Indians finished tied with the Boston Red Sox for the best record in Major League Baseball; however, Boston was awarded the #1 seed in American League due to a better head-to-head record (5–2).

=== Season standings ===
AL Central
Team	W	L	Pct.	GB	Home	Road
Cleveland Indians	96	66	.593	—	51‍–‍29	45‍–‍37
Detroit Tigers	88	74	.543	8	45‍–‍36	43‍–‍38
Minnesota Twins	79	83	.488	17	41‍–‍40	38‍–‍43
Chicago White Sox	72	90	.444	24	38‍–‍43	34‍–‍47
Kansas City Royals	69	93	.426	27	35‍–‍46	34‍–‍47

=== Record vs. opponents ===
2007 American League record Source: MLB Standings Grid – 2007
Team	BAL	BOS	CWS	CLE	DET	KC	LAA	MIN	NYY	OAK	SEA	TB	TEX	TOR	NL
Baltimore	—	6–12	5–3	3–4	1–5	7–0	3–7	0–7	9–9	4–4	2–7	11–7	4–6	8–10	6–12
Boston	12–6	—	7–1	5–2	3–4	3–3	6–4	4–3	8–10	4–4	4–5	13–5	6–4	9–9	12–6
Chicago	3–5	1–7	—	7–11	11–7	12–6	5–4	9–9	4–6	4–5	1–7	6–1	2–4	3–4	4–14
Cleveland	4–3	2–5	11–7	—	12–6	11–7	5–5	14–4	0–6	6–4	4–3	8–2	6–3	4–2	9–9
Detroit	5–1	4–3	7–11	6–12	—	11–7	3–5	12–6	4–4	4–6	6–4	3–4	5–4	4–3	14–4
Kansas City	0–7	3–3	6–12	7–11	7–11	—	5–2	9–9	1–9	6–4	3–6	4–3	5–4	3–4	10–8
Los Angeles	7–3	4–6	4–5	5–5	5–3	2–5	—	6–3	6–3	9–10	13–6	6–2	10–9	3–4	14–4
Minnesota	7–0	3–4	9–9	4–14	6–12	9–9	3–6	—	2–5	5–2	6–3	3–4	7–2	4–6	11–7
New York	9–9	10–8	6–4	6–0	4–4	9–1	3–6	5–2	—	2–4	5–5	10–8	5–1	10–8	10–8
Oakland	4–4	4–4	5–4	4–6	6–4	4–6	10–9	2–5	4–2	—	5–14	4–6	9–10	5–4	10–8
Seattle	7–2	5–4	7–1	3–4	4–6	6–3	6–13	3–6	5–5	14–5	—	4–3	11–8	4–5	9–9
Tampa Bay	7–11	5–13	1–6	2–8	4–3	3–4	2–6	4–3	8–10	6–4	3–4	—	5–4	9–9	7–11
Texas	6–4	4–6	4–2	3–6	4–5	4–5	9–10	2–7	1–5	10–9	8–11	4–5	—	5–5	11–7
Toronto	10–8	9–9	4–3	2–4	3–4	4–3	4–3	6–4	8–10	4–5	5–4	9–9	5–5	—	10–8

=== Roster ===
2007 Cleveland Indians
**Roster**
**Pitchers**: 63 Rafael Betancourt; 47 Joe Borowski; 36 Paul Byrd; 56 Fernando Cabrera; 55 Fausto Carmona; 50 Jason Davis; 46 Aaron Fultz; 39 Roberto Hernández; 44 Mike Koplove; 32 Aaron Laffey; 58 Juan Lara; 31 Cliff Lee; 50 Jensen Lewis; 40 Tom Mastny; 59 Matt Miller; 49 Edward Mujica; 53 Rafael Pérez; 52 CC Sabathia; 45 Jeremy Sowers; 61 Jason Stanford; 37 Jake Westbrook	**Catchers**: 41 Víctor Martínez; 10 Kelly Shoppach; **Infielders**: 29 Josh Barfield; 1 Casey Blake; 13 Asdrúbal Cabrera; 25 Ryan Garko; 27 Chris Gomez; 48 Travis Hafner; 30 Andy Marte; 2 Jhonny Peralta; 11 Luis Rivas; 15 Mike Rouse	**Outfielders**: 17 Shin-Soo Choo; 20 David Dellucci; 12 Ben Francisco; 38 Franklin Gutiérrez; 7 Kenny Lofton; 8 Jason Michaels; 33 Trot Nixon; 24 Grady Sizemore	**Manager**: 22 Eric Wedge; **Coaches**: 29 Jeff Datz (third base); 4 Luis Isaac (bullpen); 6 Luis Rivera (first base/infield); 39 Derek Shelton (hitting); 35 Joel Skinner (bench); 51 Carl Willis (pitching)

=== Game log ===
2007 regular season: 96–66 (Home: 51–29; Away: 45–37) game log
April: 14–8 (Home: 8–3; Away: 6–5)

#	Date	Opponent	Score	Win	Loss	Save	Attendance	Record
1	April 2	@ White Sox	12–5	**Sabathia** (1–0)	Contreras (0–1)		38,088	1–0
2	April 4	@ White Sox	8–7	**Fultz** (1–0)	Thornton (0–1)	**Borowski** (1)	26,337	2–0
3	April 5	@ White Sox	4–3	Jenks (1–0)	**Hernández** (0–1)		24,141	2–1
–	April 6	Mariners	Postponed (snow) Rescheduled for May 21					2–1
–	April 7	Mariners	Postponed (snow) Rescheduled for June 11					2–1
–	April 8	Mariners	Postponed (snow) Rescheduled for August 30					2–1
–	April 9	Mariners	Postponed (snow) Rescheduled for September 26					2–1
4	April 10	Angels*	7–6	**Sabathia** (2–0)	Santana (1–1)	**Borowski** (2)	19,031	3–1
5	April 11	Angels*	4–1	Saunders (1–0)	**Westbrook** (0–1)	Rodríguez (4)	16,375	3–2
6	April 12	Angels*	4–2	**Fultz** (2–0)	Shields (0–1)	**Borowski** (3)	17,090	4–2
7	April 13	White Sox	6–4	Vázquez (2–0)	**Carmona** (0–1)	Jenks (3)	16,789	4–3
8	April 14	White Sox	4–0	**Byrd** (1–0)	Danks (0–2)	**Borowski** (4)	18,082	5–3
9	April 15	White Sox	2–1	**Sabathia** (3–0)	Contreras (1–2)	**Borowski** (5)	14,887	6–3
10	April 17	@ Yankees	10–3	Wright (1–0)	**Westbrook** (0–2)		38,438	6–4
11	April 18	@ Yankees	9–2	Igawa (1–0)	**Sowers** (0–1)		41,379	6–5
12	April 19	@ Yankees	8–6	Henn (1–0)	**Borowski** (0–1)		40,872	6–6
13	April 20	@ Devil Rays	4–3	**Hernández** (1–1)	Salas (0–1)	**Borowski** (6)	13,391	7–6
14	April 21	@ Devil Rays	6–5	Seo (1–1)	**Byrd** (1–1)	Reyes (6)	22,805	7–7
15	April 22	@ Devil Rays	6–4	**Mastny** (1–0)	Stokes (1–3)	**Borowski** (7)	18,131	8–7
16	April 23	@ Twins	7–3 (12)	**Hernández** (2–1)	Crain (0–1)		16,067	9–7
17	April 24	@ Twins	5–3	**Carmona** (1–1)	Santana (3–2)	**Borowski** (8)	20,849	10–7
18	April 25	Rangers	8–7 (11)	**Cabrera** (1–0)	Eyre (1–1)		13,843	11–7
19	April 26	Rangers	9–4	**Byrd** (2–1)	Loe (1–1)		14,066	12–7
20	April 27	Orioles	5–4	**Westbrook** (1–2)	Trachsel (1–2)	**Borowski** (9)	20,484	13–7
21	April 28	Orioles	7–4	Walker (1–0)	**Cabrera** (1–1)	Ray (7)	25,065	13–8
22	April 29	Orioles	6–1	**Carmona** (2–1)	Wright (0–3)		25,402	14–8
*At Miller Park in Milwaukee

May: 19–11 (Home: 10–1; Away: 9–10)

#	Date	Opponent	Score	Win	Loss	Save	Attendance	Record
23	May 1	Blue Jays	12–4	**Sabathia** (4–0)	Burnett (2–2)		13,389	15–8
24	May 2	Blue Jays	7–6 (11)	**Mastny** (2–0)	Marcum (1–2)		14,163	16–8
25	May 3	Blue Jays	6–5	**Fultz** (3–0)	Frasor (1–1)	**Borowski** (10)	16,284	17–8
26	May 4	@ Orioles	3–2 (10)	Ray (3–2)	**Mastny** (2–1)		28,575	17–9
27	May 5	@ Orioles	8–2	Cabrera (2–3)	**Sowers** (0–2)		25,752	17–10
28	May 6	@ Orioles	9–6	**Sabathia** (5–0)	Burres (0–1)	**Borowski** (11)	37,464	18–10
29	May 7	@ Orioles	10–1	**Carmona** (3–1)	Bradford (0–1)		17,944	19–10
30	May 8	@ Angels	5–1	**Lee** (1–0)	Santana (2–5)		41,731	20–10
31	May 9	@ Angels	3–2	Moseley (3–0)	**Cabrera** (1–2)	Rodríguez (11)	40,007	20–11
32	May 10	@ Angels	8–0	Escobar (4–1)	**Sowers** (0–3)		33,698	20–12
33	May 11	@ Athletics	8–2	Blanton (4–1)	**Sabathia** (5–1)		20,393	20–13
34	May 12	@ Athletics	6–3	**Carmona** (4–1)	Braden (1–2)	**Borowski** (12)	22,705	21–13
35	May 13	@ Athletics	10–7	Witasick (1–0)	**Borowski** (0–2)		24,692	21–14
36	May 15	Twins	15–7	**Byrd** (3–1)	Ortiz (3–4)		23,325	22–14
37	May 16	Twins	7–1	**Sabathia** (6–1)	Silva (2–4)		17,678	23–14
38	May 17	Twins	2–0	**Carmona** (5–1)	Santana (4–4)		28,609	24–14
39	May 18	Reds	9–4	**Lee** (2–0)	Lohse (1–5)		34,230	25–14
40	May 19	Reds	10–5	Belisle (4–3)	**Sowers** (0–4)	Weathers (8)	35,262	25–15
41	May 20	Reds	5–3	**Byrd** (4–1)	Harang (5–2)	**Borowski** (13)	32,524	26–15
42	May 21	Mariners	5–2	**Mastny** (3–1)	Baek (1–2)	**Borowski** (14)	38,645	27–15
43	May 22	@ Royals	4–3	Greinke (2–4)	**Mastny** (3–2)		19,776	27–16
44	May 23	@ Royals	11–7	Duckworth (2–3)	**Lee** (2–1)		11,506	27–17
45	May 24	@ Royals	10–3	**Sowers** (1–4)	de la Rosa (4–4)		11,681	28–17
46	May 25	@ Tigers	7–4	**Byrd** (5–1)	Robertson (4–4)	**Borowski** (15)	40,074	29–17
47	May 26	@ Tigers	6–3	**Sabathia** (7–1)	Grilli (2–2)	**Borowski** (16)	40,375	30–17
48	May 27	@ Tigers	5–3	**Carmona** (6–1)	Maroth (3–2)	**Borowski** (17)	40,723	31–17
49	May 28	@ Red Sox	5–3	Schilling (5–2)	**Lee** (2–2)	Papelbon (13)	36,910	31–18
50	May 29	@ Red Sox	4–2	Beckett (8–0)	**Sowers** (1–5)	Okajima (4)	37,076	31–19
51	May 30	@ Red Sox	8–4	**Byrd** (6–1)	Matsuzaka (7–3)		37,091	32–19
52	May 31	Tigers	11–5	**Sabathia** (8–1)	Verlander (5–2)		30,038	33–19

June: 15–13 (Home: 11–8; Away: 4–5)

#	Date	Opponent	Score	Win	Loss	Save	Attendance	Record
53	June 1	Tigers	12–11	**Hernández** (1–3)	Jones (1–3)		41,365	34–19
54	June 2	Tigers	9–5	Durbin (5–1)	**Lee** (2–3)		38,254	34–20
55	June 3	Tigers	9–2	Bonderman (5–0)	**Sowers** (1–6)		30,268	34–21
56	June 5	Royals	1–0	**Sabathia** (9–1)	de la Rosa (4–6)		14,036	35–21
57	June 6	Royals	4–3	Bannister (2–3)	**Byrd** (6–2)	Dotel (2)	17,632	35–22
58	June 7	Royals	8–3	**Carmona** (7–1)	Pérez (3–6)		19,315	36–22
59	June 8	@ Reds	4–3	Bailey (1–0)	**Lee** (2–4)	Weathers (12)	38,696	36–23
60	June 9	@ Reds	8–6 (11)	**Mastny** (4–2)	Santos (1–2)	**Borowski** (18)	37,935	37–23
61	June 10	@ Reds	1–0 (12)	McBeth (1–0)	**Miller** (0–1)		30,842	37–24
62	June 11	Mariners	8–7	Morrow (3–0)	**Borowski** (0–3)		22,325	37–25
63	June 12	@ Marlins	3–0	Olsen (5–5)	**Carmona** (7–2)	Gregg (10)	15,144	37–26
64	June 13	@ Marlins	7–3	**Lee** (3–4)	Kim (3–3)		13,805	38–26
65	June 14	@ Marlins	3–2	**Stanford** (1–0)	Willis (7–6)	**Borowski** (19)	23,811	39–26
66	June 15	Braves	5–4	Soriano (2–0)	**Sabathia** (9–2)	Wickman (12)	34,848	39–27
67	June 16	Braves	6–2	Smoltz (8–3)	**Byrd** (6–3)		35,153	39–28
68	June 17	Braves	5–2	**Carmona** (8–2)	Davies (3–6)	**Borowski** (20)	33,429	40–28
69	June 18	Phillies	10–1	**Lee** (3–4)	Hamels (9–3)		18,710	41–28
70	June 19	Phillies	9–6	Kendrick (0–1)	**Stanford** (1–1)		17,371	41–29
71	June 20	Phillies	10–6	**Sabathia** (10–2)	Lieber (3–6)		24,278	42–29
72	June 22	@ Nationals	4–1	Rivera (2–2)	**Carmona** (8–3)	Cordero (12)	24,534	42–30
73	June 23	@ Nationals	4–3	**Mastny** (5–2)	Cordero (1–2)	**Borowski** (21)	32,539	43–30
74	June 24	@ Nationals	3–1	Simontacchi (5–5)	**Westbrook** (1–3)	Cordero (13)	26,413	43–31
75	June 25	Athletics	5–2	**Sabathia** (11–2)	Gaudin (6–3)		17,737	44–31
76	June 26	Athletics	8–5	**Betancourt** (1–0)	Embree (1–1)		18,494	45–31
77	June 27	Athletics	13–2	DiNardo (3–4)	**Carmona** (8–4)		18,614	45–32
78	June 28	Athletics	4–3	**Byrd** (7–3)	Flores (0–2)	**Borowski** (22)	22,921	46–32
79	June 29	Devil Rays	2–1	**Borowski** (1–3)	Shawn Camp (0–2)		34,557	47–32
80	June 30	Devil Rays	8–6	**Sabathia** (12–2)	Howell (1–2)	**Borowski** (23)	36,726	48–32

July: 12–14 (Home: 7–9; Away: 5–5)

#	Date	Opponent	Score	Win	Loss	Save	Attendance	Record
81	July 1	Devil Rays	3–2	**Lee** (5–4)	Shields (6–4)	**Borowski** (24)	30,410	49–32
82	July 2	Devil Rays	10–2	**Carmona** (9–4)	Sonnanstine (1–3)		34,372	50–32
83	July 3	@ Tigers	5–4 (11)	**Mastny** (6–2)	Capellán (0–3)	**Borowski** (25)	40,741	51–32
84	July 4	@ Tigers	6–4	Rogers (3–0)	**Westbrook** (1–4)	Jones (21)	40,782	51–33
85	July 5	@ Tigers	12–3	Verlander (10–3)	**Sabathia** (12–3)		40,923	51–34
86	July 6	@ Blue Jays	8–6	Halladay (10–3)	**Lee** (5–5)	Accardo (11)	28,526	51–35
87	July 7	@ Blue Jays	9–4	**Carmona** (10–4)	Marcum (4–3)		25,744	52–35
88	July 8	@ Blue Jays	1–0	Accardo (2–3)	**Byrd** (7–4)		28,239	52–36
89	July 13	Royals	5–4	**Borowski** (2–3)	Greinke (4–5)		32,624	53–36
90	July 14	Royals	6–5	Meche (6–6)	**Sabathia** (12–4)	Dotel (9)	31,599	53–37
91	July 15	Royals	5–3	**Carmona** (11–4)	de la Rosa (7–10)	**Borowski** (26)	29,657	54–37
92	July 16	White Sox	11–10	Danks (6–6)	**Lee** (5–6)	Jenks (25)	21,460	54–38
93	July 17	White Sox	6–5 (11)	**Betancourt** (2–0)	Day (0–1)		21,321	55–38
94	July 18	White Sox	5–1	Buehrle (7–5)	**Westbrook** (1–5)		29,822	55–39
95	July 19	@ Rangers	7–5	**Sabathia** (13–4)	Loe (5–8)	**Borowski** (27)	28,108	56–39
96	July 20	@ Rangers	3–2	**Carmona** (12–4)	McCarthy (4–7)	**Borowski** (28)	32,103	57–39
97	July 21	@ Rangers	8–5	Mahay (2–0)	**Lee** (5–7)		44,554	57–40
98	July 22	@ Rangers	8–3	**Byrd** (8–4)	Tejeda (5–9)		27,227	58–40
99	July 23	Red Sox	6–2	Lester (1–0)	**Westbrook** (1–6)	Delcarmen (1)	32,439	58–41
100	July 24	Red Sox	1–0	Matsuzaka (12–7)	**Sabathia** (13–5)	Papelbon (23)	39,339	58–42
101	July 25	Red Sox	1–0	**Carmona** (13–4)	Beckett (13–4)	**Borowski** (29)	29,614	59–42
102	July 26	Red Sox	14–9	Tavárez (6–8)	**Lee** (5–8)		34,286	59–43
103	July 27	Twins	10–4	**Byrd** (9–4)	Bonser (5–7)		37–292	60–43
104	July 28	Twins	3–2	Neshek (6–1)	**Borowski** (2–4)	Nathan (21)	41,203	60–44
105	July 29	Twins	4–1	Reyes (2–1)	**Sabathia** (13–6)	Nathan (22)	37,102	60–45
106	July 31	Rangers	3–1	McCarthy (5–7)	**Carmona** (13–5)	Wilson (1)	21,811	60–46

August: 17–11 (Home: 7–5; Away: 10–6)

#	Date	Opponent	Score	Win	Loss	Save	Attendance	Record
107	August 1	Rangers	9–6 (10)	Benoit (5–3)	**Lewis** (0–1)	Wilson (2)	25,721	60–47
108	August 2	Rangers	5–0	**Westbrook** (2–6)	Gabbard (4–1)		27,250	61–47
109	August 3	@ Twins	5–2	**Sabathia** (14–6)	Santana (11–9)	**Borowski** (30)	31,664	62–47
110	August 4	@ Twins	3–2	Ortiz (4–4)	**Laffey** (0–1)	Nathan (25)	33,663	62–48
111	August 5	@ Twins	1–0	Baker (6–4)	**Carmona** (13–6)	Nathan (26)	38,334	62–49
112	August 6	@ Twins	4–0	**Byrd** (10–4)	Silva (9–12)		28,314	63–49
113	August 7	@ White Sox	2–1	**Westbrook** (3–6)	Danks (6–9)	**Borowski** (31)	32,315	64–49
114	August 8	@ White Sox	6–4 (13)	Contreras (6–14)	**Fultz** (3–2)		33,147	64–50
115	August 9	@ White Sox	7–5	**Laffey** (1–1)	Buehrle (9–7)	**Borowski** (32)	36,399	65–50
116	August 10	Yankees	6–1	Hughes (2–1)	**Carmona** (13–7)		41,675	65–51
117	August 11	Yankees	11–2	Mussina (8–7)	**Byrd** (10–5)		41,977	65–52
118	August 12	Yankees	5–3	Pettitte (9–7)	**Westbrook** (3–7)	Rivera (19)	41,612	65–53
119	August 14	Tigers	6–2 (10)	Rodney (2–5)	**Borowski** (2–5)		37,570	65–54
120	August 15	Tigers	5–2	**Carmona** (14–7)	Jurrjens (0–1)	**Borowski** (33)	39,250	66–54
121	August 17	@ Devil Rays	2–1	**Byrd** (11–5)	Jackson (3–12)	**Borowski** (34)	15,343	67–54
122	August 18	@ Devil Rays	8–1	**Westbrook** (4–7)	Hammel (1–3)		24,397	68–54
123	August 19	@ Devil Rays	4–3 (12)	Dohmann (2–0)	**Pérez** (0–1)		22,328	68–55
124	August 21	@ Tigers	2–1	Jurrjens (1–1)	**Carmona** (14–8)	Jones (32)	42,868	68–56
125	August 22	@ Tigers	11–8	**Byrd** (12–5)	Verlander (13–5)	**Borowski** (35)	40,914	69–56
126	August 23	@ Tigers	3–1 (10)	**Pérez** (1–1)	Zumaya (1–2)	**Borowski** (36)	40,946	70–56
127	August 24	@ Royals	2–1	Bale (1–1)	**Sabathia** (14–7)	Soria (14)	25,640	70–57
128	August 25	@ Royals	9–4	**Laffey** (2–1)	Davies (5–11)		23,167	71–57
129	August 26	@ Royals	5–3 (11)	**Betancourt** (3–0)	Peralta (1–3)	**Borowski** (37)	18,268	72–57
130	August 27	Twins	8–3	**Byrd** (13–5)	Silva (10–13)		23,178	73–57
131	August 28	Twins	6–5	**Westbrook** (5–7)	Bonser (6–11)	**Borowski** (38)	24,784	74–57
132	August 29	Twins	4–3	**Sabathia** (15–7)	Santana (14–10)	**Borowski** (39)	27,303	75–57
133	August 30	Mariners	6–5	**Borowski** (3–5)	O'Flaherty (7–1)		25,949	76–57
134	August 31	White Sox	8–5	**Fultz** (4–2)	MacDougal (1–5)	**Betancourt** (1)	38,325	77–57

September: 19–9 (Home: 8–3; Away: 11–6)

#	Date	Opponent	Score	Win	Loss	Save	Attendance	Record
135	September 1	White Sox	7–0	**Byrd** (14–5)	Vázquez (11–8)		41,131	78–57
136	September 2	White Sox	8–0	Contreras (8–16)	**Westbrook** (5–8)		37,718	78–58
137	September 3	@ Twins	5–0	**Sabathia** (16–7)	Santana (14–11)		24,105	79–58
138	September 4	@ Twins	7–5 (11)	**Betancourt** (4–0)	DePaula (0–1)	**Borowski** (40)	16,218	80–58
139	September 5	@ Twins	6–2	**Carmona** (15–8)	Baker (8–7)	**Pérez** (1)	13,977	81–58
140	September 6	@ Angels	10–3	Escobar (16–7)	**Byrd** (14–6)		41,720	81–59
141	September 7	@ Angels	3–2 (10)	Shields (4–5)	**Betancourt** (4–1)		40,020	81–60
142	September 8	@ Angels	6–1	**Sabathia** (17–7)	Santana (6–13)		43,544	82–60
143	September 9	@ Angels	6–2	**Laffey** (3–1)	Weaver (11–7)		40,037	83–60
144	September 10	@ White Sox	6–2	**Carmona** (16–8)	Floyd (1–3)		30,126	84–60
145	September 11	@ White Sox	8–3	**Byrd** (15–6)	Broadway (0–1)		31,939	85–60
146	September 12	@ White Sox	7–4	J. Vázquez (12–8)	**Westbrook** (5–9)		23,537	85–61
147	September 14	Royals	5–4	**Borowski** (4–5)	Riske (1–4)		35,230	86–61
148	September 15	Royals	6–0	**Carmona** (17–8)	Greinke (6–6)		32,113	87–61
149	September 16	Royals	4–3	Buckner (1–1)	**Laffey** (3–2)	Soria (15)	30,112	87–62
150	September 17	Tigers	6–5 (11)	**Betancourt** (5–1)	Miner (3–4)		28,825	88–62
151	September 18	Tigers	7–4	**Lewis** (1–1)	Verlander (17–6)	**Borowski** (41)	41,103	89–62
152	September 19	Tigers	4–2	**Sabathia** (18–7)	Robertson (8–12)	**Borowski** (42)	32,511	90–62
153	September 21	Athletics	4–3	**Carmona** (18–8)	Blanton (14–10)	**Borowski** (43)	36,016	91–62
154	September 22	Athletics	9–3	Haren (15–8)	**Byrd** (15–7)		40,663	91–63
155	September 23	Athletics	6–2	**Westbrook** (6–9)	Braden (1–8)	**Betancourt** (2)	40,250	92–63
156	September 25	@ Mariners	4–3 (12)	**Mastny** (7–2)	Morrow (3–4)	**Betancourt** (3)	22,200	93–63
157	September 26	Mariners	12–4	**Carmona** (19–8)	Feierabend (1–6)		n/a	94–63
158	September 26	@ Mariners	3–2 (10)	Putz (5–1)	**Fultz** (4–3)		26,801	94–64
159	September 27	@ Mariners	4–2	Baek (4–3)	**Byrd** (15–8)	Sherrill (3)	21,285	94–65
160	September 28	@ Royals	5–3	**Sabathia** (19–7)	Davies (7–15)	**Borowski** (44)	29,846	95–65
161	September 29	@ Royals	4–3	Soria (2–3)	**Pérez** (1–2)		24,274	95–66
162	September 30	@ Royals	4–2	**Laffey** (4–2)	Hochevar (0–1)	**Borowski** (45)	19,104	96–66

Legend: = Win = Loss = Postponement
**Bold** = Indians team member

== Player stats ==
Note: Team leaders in each category are noted in bold.

Note: * = League leader in category.

=== Batting ===
Note: G = Games played; AB = At bats; R = Runs scored; H = Hits; 2B = Doubles; 3B = Triples; HR = Home runs; RBI = Runs batted in; BB = Walks; AVG = Batting average; SB = Stolen bases

Player	G	AB	R	H	2B	3B	HR	RBI	BB	AVG	SB
Josh Barfield	130	420	53	102	19	3	3	50	14	.243	14
Rafael Betancourt	4	1	0	0	0	0	0	0	0	.000	0
Casey Blake	156	588	81	159	36	4	18	78	54	.270	4
Joe Borowski	5	0	0	0	0	0	0	0	0	—	0
Paul Byrd	1	2	0	0	0	0	0	0	0	.000	0
Asdrúbal Cabrera	45	159	30	45	9	2	3	22	17	.283	0
Fernando Cabrera	1	0	0	0	0	0	0	0	0	—	0
Fausto Carmona	2	4	0	0	0	0	0	0	0	.000	0
Shin-Soo Choo	6	17	5	5	0	0	0	5	2	.294	0
David Dellucci	56	178	25	41	11	2	4	20	17	.230	2
Ben Francisco	25	62	10	17	5	0	3	12	3	.274	0
Aaron Fultz	2	0	0	0	0	0	0	0	0	—	0
Ryan Garko	138	484	62	140	29	1	21	61	34	.289	0
Chris Gomez	19	53	4	15	2	0	0	5	0	.283	0
Franklin Gutierrez	100	271	41	72	13	2	13	36	21	.266	8
Travis Hafner	152	545	80	145	25	2	24	100	**102**	.266	1
Roberto Hernández	2	0	0	0	0	0	0	0	0	—	0
Cliff Lee	2	5	0	0	0	0	0	0	0	.000	0
Kenny Lofton	52	173	24	49	9	3	0	15	17	.283	2
Andy Marte	20	57	3	11	4	0	1	8	2	.193	0
Victor Martinez	147	562	78	169	**40**	0	**25**	**114**	62	**.301**	0
Tom Mastny	5	0	0	0	0	0	0	0	0	—	0
Jason Michaels	105	267	43	72	11	1	7	39	20	.270	3
Matt Miller	2	0	0	0	0	0	0	0	0	—	0
Trot Nixon	99	307	30	77	17	0	3	31	44	.251	0
Jhonny Peralta	152	574	87	155	27	1	21	72	61	.270	4
Rafael Perez	2	0	0	0	0	0	0	0	0	—	0
Luis Rivas	4	11	3	3	0	1	1	4	0	.273	0
Mike Rouse	41	67	7	8	1	0	0	4	7	.119	1
CC Sabathia	1	3	0	2	0	0	0	0	0	.667	0
Kelly Shoppach	59	161	26	42	13	0	7	30	11	.261	0
Grady Sizemore	**162***	**628**	**118**	**174**	34	**5**	24	78	101	.277	**33**
Jeremy Sowers	1	1	1	1	0	0	0	0	1	1.000	0
Jason Stanford	1	2	0	0	0	0	0	0	0	.000	0
Jake Westbrook	1	2	0	0	0	0	0	0	0	.000	0
**Team totals**	**162**	**5604**	**811**	**1504**	**305**	**27**	**178**	**784**	**590**	**.268**	**72**

=== Pitching ===
Note: W = Wins; L = Losses; ERA = Earned run average; G = Games pitched; GS = Games started; SV = Saves; IP = Innings pitched; H = Hits allowed; R = Runs allowed; ER = Earned runs allowed; BB = Walks allowed; K = Strikeouts

Player	W	L	ERA	G	GS	SV	IP	H	R	ER	BB	K
Rafael Betancourt	5	1	1.47	68	0	3	79.1	51	13	13	9	80
Joe Borowski	4	5	5.07	**69**	0	**45**	65.2	77	39	37	17	58
Paul Byrd	15	8	4.59	31	31	0	192.1	239	**107**	**98**	28	88
Fernando Cabrera	1	2	5.61	24	0	0	33.2	38	22	21	22	39
Fausto Carmona	**19**	8	**3.06**	32	32	0	215.0	199	78	73	**61**	137
Jason Davis	0	0	4.76	8	0	0	11.1	13	6	6	9	5
Aaron Fultz	4	3	2.92	49	0	0	37.0	31	12	12	18	28
Roberto Hernández	3	1	6.23	28	0	0	26.0	33	21	18	16	18
Mike Koplove	0	0	6.00	5	0	0	6.0	6	4	4	2	4
Aaron Laffey	4	2	4.56	9	9	0	49.1	54	26	25	12	25
Juan Lara	0	0	13.50	1	0	0	1.1	2	2	2	1	2
Cliff Lee	5	8	6.29	20	16	0	97.1	112	73	68	36	66
Jensen Lewis	1	1	2.15	26	0	0	29.1	26	8	7	10	34
Tom Mastny	7	2	4.68	51	0	0	57.2	63	30	30	32	52
Matt Miller	0	0	0.00	2	0	0	1.0	2	0	0	0	0
Edward Mujica	0	0	8.31	10	0	0	13.0	19	12	12	2	7
Rafael Perez	1	2	1.78	44	0	1	60.2	41	15	12	15	62
CC Sabathia	**19**	7	3.21	34	**34***	0	**241.0***	**238**	94	86	37	**209**
Jeremy Sowers	1	6	6.42	13	13	0	67.1	84	49	48	21	24
Jason Stanford	1	1	4.78	8	2	0	26.1	32	15	14	7	16
Jake Westbrook	6	**9**	4.32	25	25	0	152.0	159	78	73	55	93
**Team totals**	**96**	**66**	**4.05**	**162**	**162**	**49**	**1462.2**	**1519**	**704**	**659**	**410**	**1047**

== Playoffs ==
=== Division Series ===
==== Game 1 ====
CC Sabathia matched up against Chien-Ming Wang of the New York Yankees, the Wild Card winner. The Indians won 12–3. Sabathia did not pitch particularly well, but turned in a gritty performance that kept the Tribe in the lead until the offense exploded in the fifth against Wang. They had 4 home runs to set the club record for home runs in a postseason game. The home runs were hit by Asdrúbal Cabrera, Travis Hafner, Victor Martinez, and Ryan Garko.

==== Game 2 ====
Fausto Carmona and Andy Pettitte had one of the most memorable pitching duels of ALDS history, with Pettitte allowing no runs over 6 1/3 innings and Carmona one run over 9. Cleveland squandered many opportunities to tie or take the lead, eventually tying it in the eighth inning after a walk to Grady Sizemore, followed by a wild pitch, a sacrifice bunt by Asdrúbal Cabrera, and another wild pitch off rookie pitching sensation Joba Chamberlain. The run was controversial as Chamberlain appeared bothered by a swarm of midges. Although TBS sideline reporter Craig Sager reported being told by Cleveland Indians security that they are referred to locally as Canadian Soldiers, the nickname actually refers to the mayfly, which also hatches in swarms, but in June. The Indians won 2–1 in 11 innings on a bases-loaded walk-off single by Hafner.

==== Game 3 ====
Roger Clemens and Jake Westbrook squared off in the Bronx, with Clemens getting into trouble early. He was relieved ably by Phil Hughes. Westbrook struggled in the middle innings, giving up the lead on a home run by Johnny Damon. The Yankees never looked back and cruised to an 8–4 win.

==== Game 4 ====
Wang returned on three days' rest to pitch against Paul Byrd, Eric Wedge electing to trust his third best starter (by wins) and save Sabathia for a game five. Byrd returned the trust by allowing just two runs over five innings. Wang was drummed out after only one full inning, pitching to three batters in the second. The Yankees then paraded a number of relievers to the hill, starting with demoted starter Mike Mussina, and chipped away all the way to the ninth inning. But the Yankees couldn't get all the way back and the Indians won 6–4, advancing to the American League Championship Series against the Boston Red Sox.

=== ALCS ===
==== Game 1 ====
Josh Beckett of the Red Sox pitched well and Sabathia didn't, leading Boston to a 10–3 victory and an early 1–0 advantage in the series. Sabathia uncharacteristically walked 5.

==== Game 2 ====
Curt Schilling squared up against Carmona in a pivotal game in the series. Carmona and reliever Rafael Pérez pitched as poorly as Sabathia the day before, nibbling around the edges and then getting hurt when throwing in hitter's counts. The rest of the Indians realizing this would be important later. Schilling was less than stellar as well, resulting in a see-saw game that was tied after nine. In the tenth inning Tom Mastny shut down the heart of Boston's lineup by throwing strikes, then in the eleventh, the Indians scored 7 runs to win 13–6, tying the series at 1–1.

==== Game 3 ====
Westbrook matched up against Daisuke Matsuzaka and carried forward the first strike first philosophy of the end of game 2 to keep the Boston bats in check. Matsuzaka gave up a two-run homer to Kenny Lofton and didn't get through the fifth inning. The Indians went on to win 4-2 and to take a 2–1 advantage in the series.

==== Game 4 ====
Byrd and Tim Wakefield started game 4 in a match-up Byrd said might have been "the slowest-throwing right-handed match-up of all time in the post-season". It was also for four innings one of the best pitched match-ups, with both throwing shutouts. However, Casey Blake homered to start the fifth, on the way to the Indians scoring seven runs in one inning for the second time in the series. Boston hitting three straight solo home runs in the sixth closed the gap slightly but not nearly enough and the Indians won 7–3 to take a commanding 3–1 series lead.

==== Game 5 ====
Sabathia matched up again with Beckett and while he pitched better than the first game, the Red Sox once again had their way with him and sent the Indians down to defeat 7–1, keeping Boston alive in the series.

==== Game 6 ====
Back in Boston, Schilling pitched much more effectively than his last start while Carmona pitched worse. In the first inning, Boston loaded the bases with no outs. While Manny Ramirez and Mike Lowell were retired without anyone advancing, JD Drew hit a grand slam into the center field bleachers. The crowd went crazy celebrating a 4–0 lead. The Indians defense also played poorly and the team was beaten soundly by the Red Sox 12–2. This knotted the series at 3 and was a portent of the deciding game.

==== Game 7 ====
Matsuzaka pitched well against Westbrook, fortified by an early lead. The Indians threatened to tie the game in the 7th inning when a bizarre play and an error in judgment by the third base coach left the speedy Kenny Lofton on third base and not scoring on a ball hit down the third base line and bounding out to left field. On the very next pitch, Casey Blake hit into an inning ending double play and Boston's 3–2 lead was preserved. In the bottom of the frame, Dustin Pedroia hit a two run homerun over the Green Monster to widen the lead at 5–2. In the eighth, the Sox scored 6 runs to ice the game on a bases clearing double by Pedroia and a capped off by a two run homer by Kevin Youkilis. The game had remained close until Boston broke it open on the previously reliable Rafael Betancourt, cruising to an 11–2 victory and the American League's berth in the World Series. The final out was recorded on a great catch by Coco Crisp going to the deepest part of the triangle in center field. The catch was the perfect exclamation point on a great comeback by Boston to go to return to the World Series.

=== Game log ===
2007 Post Season game log
American League Division Series

#	Date	Opponent	Score	Win	Loss	Save	Attendance	Record
1	October 4	Yankees	12–3	Sabathia	Wang		44,608	1–0
2	October 5	Yankees	2–1 _{(11)}	Pérez	Vizcaíno		44,732	2–0
3	October 7	@ Yankees	8–4	Hughes	Westbrook		56,358	2–1
4	October 8	@ Yankees	6–4	Byrd	Wang	Borowski	56,315	3–1

American League Championship Series

#	Date	Opponent	Score	Win	Loss	Save	Attendance	Record
1	October 12	@ Red Sox	10–3	Beckett	Sabathia		36,986	0–1
2	October 13	@ Red Sox	13–6 (11)	Mastny	Gagné		37,051	1–1
3	October 15	Red Sox	4–2	Westbrook	Matsuzaka	Borowski	44,402	2–1
4	October 16	Red Sox	7–3	Byrd	Wakefield		44,008	3–1
5	October 18	Red Sox	7–1	Beckett	Sabathia		44,588	3–2
6	October 20	@ Red Sox	12–2	Schilling	Carmona		37,163	3–3
7	October 21	@ Red Sox	11–2	Matsuzaka	Westbrook	Papelbon	37,165	3–4

== Minor league affiliates ==
Classification level	Team	League
AAA	Buffalo Bisons	International League
AA	Akron Aeros	Eastern League
Advanced A	Kinston Indians	Carolina League
A	Lake County Captains	South Atlantic League
Short Season A	Mahoning Valley Scrappers	New York–Penn League
Rookie	Gulf Coast Indians	Gulf Coast League
