= Ozzie Virgil Sr. =

Dominican baseball player and coach (1932–2024)

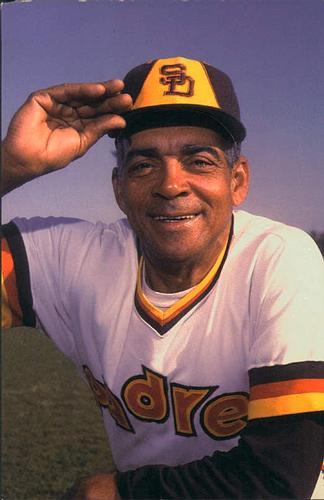
- Virgil with the San Diego Padres in 1983
- Utility player
- Born: May 17, 1932; Monte Cristi, Dominican Republic
- Died: September 29, 2024 (aged 92); Monte Cristi, Dominican Republic
- Batted: Right Threw: Right

MLB debut
- September 23, 1956, for the New York Giants

Last MLB appearance
- June 27, 1969, for the San Francisco Giants

MLB statistics
- Batting average: .231
- Home runs: 14
- Runs batted in: 73
- Stats at Baseball Reference

Teams
- New York Giants (1956–1957); Detroit Tigers (1958, 1960–1961); Kansas City Athletics (1961); Baltimore Orioles (1962); Pittsburgh Pirates (1965); San Francisco Giants (1966, 1969)

Osvaldo José Virgil Pichardo (May 17, 1932 – September 29, 2024) was a Dominican professional baseball player and coach. He was the first person from the Dominican Republic to play in Major League Baseball (MLB) post-integration, appearing in 324 MLB games between 1956 and 1969 as a utility player for the New York / San Francisco Giants, Detroit Tigers, Kansas City Athletics, Baltimore Orioles, and the Pittsburgh Pirates. (Note: Virgil was not the first Dominican to play in a recognized major league. Pedro San debuted with the Cuban Stars (East) of the Eastern Colored League (ECL) in 1926; the ECL is now one of the six historical Negro leagues recognized as a major league by MLB.)

Frequently a third baseman, Virgil played every position except pitcher and center field. He batted and threw right-handed, was 6 feet 1 inch (1.85 m) tall and weighed 174 pounds (79 kg).

== Early life ==
Virgil was born in Monte Cristi, Dominican Republic on May 17, 1932. His family emigrated to the United States when he was 13 and settled in the Bronx, where Virgil graduated from DeWitt Clinton High School. He served in the United States Marines from 1950 to 1952.

== Career ==
Virgil began his 17-season professional playing career in 1953. He made his MLB debut for the New York Giants on September 23, 1956; he became the first person born in the Dominican Republic to play in Major League Baseball (though Negro league pitcher Pedro San is now recognized as the first Dominican to play in any major league).. He batted 5-for-12 (.417) in three games for the Giants in 1956. On January 28, 1958, the Giants traded Virgil and Gail Harris to the Detroit Tigers for Jim Finigan and $25,000.

In 1960, Virgil played at third base, second base and the outfield under manager Charlie Metro with the Denver Bears in Triple-A. He was batting .381 with 55 runs batted in (RBIs) in 59 games when he was promoted to Detroit. "I was crazy about him. He did everything well", said Metro. Virgil made his debut with Detroit on June 6, 1958. He was called the first black player for the Tigers, one of the last teams to break the color barrier, though in reality he was their first Latino. Later, in his home debut, he batted second in the lineup and went 5-for-5. The Briggs Stadium crowd gave him a standing ovation that he said he never forgot.

After moving to the Kansas City Royals, Metro wanted to draft Virgil as a player-coach out of the Giants organization, where he was playing in Triple-A. According to Metro, after Giant scout Tom Sheehan overheard his interest, the team promoted Virgil to the major leagues to protect him. Virgil played in one game for the Giants in June 1969, ending his career. In a nine-season big-league career, he posted a .231 batting average with 174 hits, 14 home runs and 73 RBI.

After his playing career, Virgil spent 19 seasons as a coach for the Giants (1969–1972; 1974–1975); Montreal Expos (1976–1981); San Diego Padres (1982–1985); and Seattle Mariners (1986–1988). From 1977 to 1988, he served as the third-base coach on the staff of Baseball Hall of Fame manager Dick Williams. They won the NL pennant with the Padres in 1984, and Virgil was the NL third-base coach at the 1985 All-Star Game.

== Personal life ==
Virgil's son, Ozzie Jr., played as a catcher in all or parts of 11 MLB seasons and was a two-time NL All-Star. He played with his father in the 1985 All-Star Game, when he had a two-run single in the NL's win.

Osvaldo Virgil National Airport opened in 2006 in the Monte Cristi Province.

Virgil died from pancreatitis at his home in Monte Cristi on September 29, 2024. He was 92.

== See also ==
- List of first black Major League Baseball players
- List of second-generation Major League Baseball players
- List of players from Dominican Republic in Major League Baseball
