= Harry Kingman =

American baseball player (1892–1982)

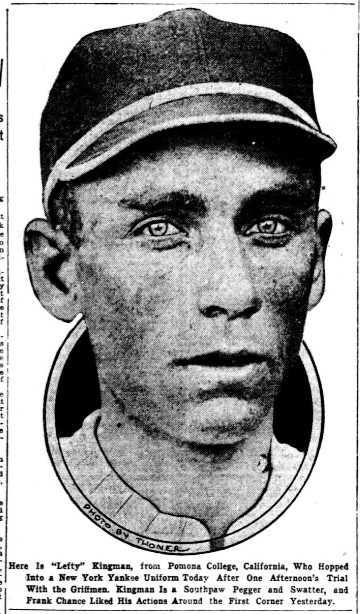
- First baseman
- Born: April 3, 1892; Tianjin, Qing Empire
- Died: December 27, 1982 (aged 90); Oakland, California, U.S.
- Batted: Left Threw: Left

MLB debut
- July 1, 1914, for the New York Yankees

Last MLB appearance
- August 20, 1914, for the New York Yankees

MLB statistics
- Games played: 4
- At bats: 3
- Hits: 0
- Stats at Baseball Reference

Teams
- New York Yankees (1914)

Career highlights and awards
- First Chinese-born major league baseball player

Henry Lees "Harry" Kingman (April 3, 1892 – December 27, 1982) was an American professional baseball first baseman. He played briefly in the major leagues for the New York Yankees in 1914. In later life, he worked against racial discrimination while working within institutions associated with the University of California, Berkeley and in retirement.

== Early life ==
Harry Kingman was born in Tianjin to two western missionaries. In 1899, his father became a chaplain at Pomona College, and Harry eventually attended school there, becoming a star in five sports: baseball, basketball, tennis, track, and swimming. He signed his first major league contract, with the Washington Senators, in June 1914.

== Major league baseball ==
Frank Chance, watching Kingman work out during a game between the New York Yankees and the Senators, was impressed with his performance and asked Clark Griffith if he could get traded to the Yankees. Griffith agreed to the deal on June 29, knowing that the Senators already had a first baseman. He was originally a first baseman, but manager Frank Chance attempted to convert him into a pitcher. That did not work out and Kingman eventually appeared in only one game in the field and three as a pinch hitter during July and August 1914. He went 0-for-3 at the plate with two strikeouts and one walk.

Kingman was the first major league player to have been born in China. Until 2016, he was the only MLB player to have been born in China. Austin Brice, who debuted in 2016, was born in British Hong Kong in 1992. Kingman was the only Asian-born player from any country to appear in MLB until Japanese pitcher Masanori Murakami pitched for the San Francisco Giants in 1964.

Kingman stood at 73 inches (1.9 m) and weighed 165 pounds (75 kg).

== Later life ==
Kingman left baseball after the season was over and got a job in Stiles Hall (originally the Berkeley YMCA) at the University of California, Berkeley. From 1921 to 1927, he traveled to China and Japan and worked as a missionary, while also playing and coaching baseball. Kingman married his wife Ruth in Shanghai in 1922 and they had one daughter. He returned to Berkeley in 1927. He helped found the Berkeley Student Cooperative in 1933, whose founding antidiscrimination goals included to offer: "low-rent housing to all university students, regardless of race, creed, color or national origin, and thus influence the community to eliminate prejudice and discrimination in housing." For the next 24 years, he worked at Stiles Hall. While its general secretary during World War II, he and his wife "helped dozens of Japanese American students escape internment by relocating them to schools in other parts of the country".

Kingman also coached the university's junior varsity baseball team until his retirement, and maintained an active interest in baseball.

After retiring in 1957, Kingman and his wife Ruth moved to Washington D.C. to work as civil rights lobbyists, until they fully retired in 1968. Kingman died at Piedmont Gardens, a retirement community in Oakland, California, on December 27, 1982, age 90.
