= List of Major League Baseball players from Jamaica =

This is a chronological list of players from Jamaica who have played in Major League Baseball.

== Players ==
Name	Debut	Final Game	Position	Teams	Ref
Oscar Levis	1923	1931	Pitcher/Outfielder/First baseman	Cuban Stars East, Hilldale Club	
Chili Davis	April 10, 1981	October 3, 1999	Outfielder/Designated hitter	San Francisco Giants, California Angels, Minnesota Twins, Kansas City Royals, New York Yankees	
Devon White	September 2, 1985	October 5, 2001	Outfielder	California Angels, Toronto Blue Jays, Florida Marlins, Arizona Diamondbacks, Los Angeles Dodgers, Milwaukee Brewers	
Rolando Roomes	April 12, 1988	September 30, 1990	Outfielder	Chicago Cubs, Cincinnati Reds, Montreal Expos	
Justin Masterson	April 24, 2008	August 9, 2015	Pitcher	Boston Red Sox, Cleveland Indians, St. Louis Cardinals	
