= Roberto Hernández (starting pitcher) =

Dominican baseball player (born 1980)

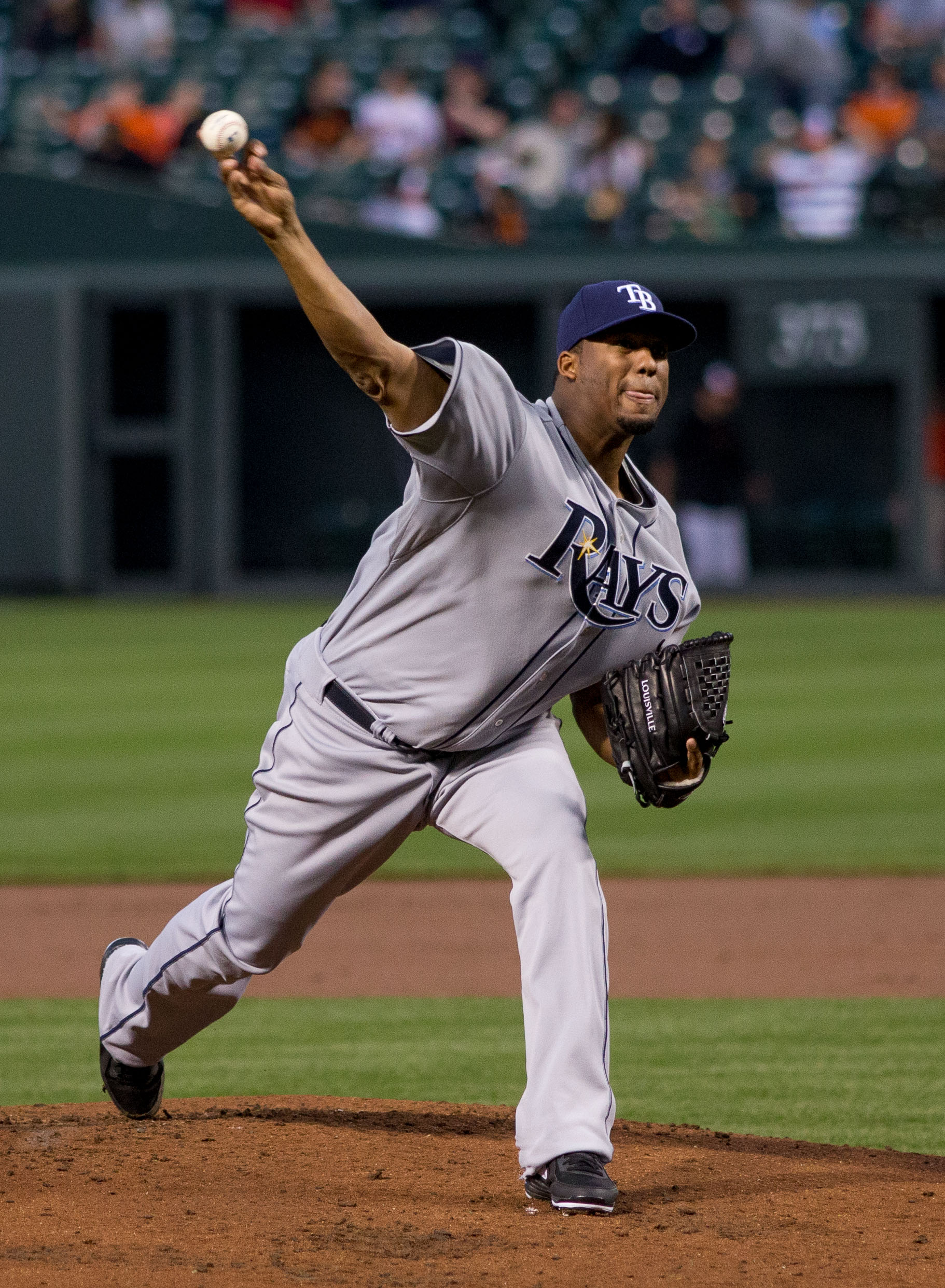
- Hernández with the Tampa Bay Rays
- Pitcher
- Born: August 30, 1980 (age 46); Santo Domingo, Dominican Republic
- Batted: Right Threw: Right

MLB debut
- April 15, 2006, for the Cleveland Indians

Last MLB appearance
- August 11, 2016, for the Atlanta Braves

MLB statistics
- Win–loss record: 71–99
- Earned run average: 4.60
- Strikeouts: 833
- Stats at Baseball Reference

Teams
- Cleveland Indians (2006–2012); Tampa Bay Rays (2013); Philadelphia Phillies (2014); Los Angeles Dodgers (2014); Houston Astros (2015); Atlanta Braves (2016)

Career highlights and awards
- All-Star (2010)

Roberto Hernández Heredia (born August 30, 1980) is a Dominican former professional baseball pitcher. He played in Major League Baseball (MLB) for the Cleveland Indians, Tampa Bay Rays, Philadelphia Phillies, Los Angeles Dodgers, Houston Astros, and Atlanta Braves.

Hernández was a regular part of the Indians' starting rotation for six years under the name of Fausto Carmona, which he had used to obtain a visa to pitch in the United States. After Hernández's true name and age were revealed (he was three years older than he claimed), Hernández missed much of the 2012 season due to lack of a valid visa, followed by a suspension from MLB for identity fraud. He returned to the league in 2013 with the Tampa Bay Rays.

Coincidentally, while playing as Fausto Carmona for the Cleveland Indians in 2007, Hernández had a teammate whose name was also Roberto Hernández.

== Professional career ==
=== Minor leagues ===
Hernández (as Carmona) was signed as an amateur free agent by the Cleveland Indians on December 28, 2000. In 2003, he compiled a record of 17–4 with a 2.06 ERA in 24 starts for the Single-A Lake County Captains. This led to him being honored as the Most Outstanding Player of the South Atlantic League, receiving All-Star honors both for the South Atlantic League and for all of Class-A, and he was named the Indians' 2003 Minor League Player of the Year (receiving the "Lou Boudreau Award"). He split 2004 between the Single-A Kinston Indians of the Carolina League and the Double-A Akron Aeros of the Eastern League. Combined, he was 10–10 with a 4.09 ERA in 28 starts.

The following year, 2005, Hernández split his time between the Aeros and the Triple-A Buffalo Bisons of the International League. He was 13–9 with a 3.68 ERA in 26 starts.

=== Cleveland Indians ===
On April 15, 2006, Hernández made his MLB debut, starting against the Detroit Tigers at Comerica Park. He pitched six innings, giving up one earned run and striking out four. He earned the win, which was his only win of the season.

On July 20, 2006, the Indians traded closer Bob Wickman to the Atlanta Braves, and the Indians chose Hernández to fill the role. In the span of seven days (from July 30 through August 5), Hernández recorded four losses and three blown saves for the Indians, including walk-off home runs surrendered to Boston's David Ortiz and Detroit's Iván Rodríguez. Hernández lost the closer role to Tom Mastny soon thereafter.

After the closer experiment, Hernández was demoted to Triple-A Buffalo on August 26, where he was placed back in a starting role. He was promoted to Cleveland again in September, and finished the season as a starter. Hernández ended the 2006 season with a record of 1–10 and a 5.42 ERA in 38 games (seven starts).

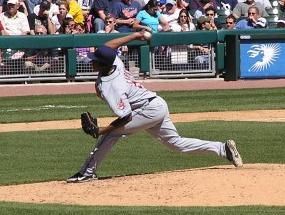
Hernández pitching in his MLB debut

In 2007, Hernández was originally slated to be the Indians' spot starter and to begin the season with the Triple-A Buffalo Bisons. However, after Cliff Lee went down with an abdominal strain in spring training that would force him to miss at least the first three weeks of the season, the Indians gave Hernández the opportunity to start in Lee's place. In Hernández's first start of the season, on April 13, the Chicago White Sox battered him for six earned runs in 4 1/3 innings.

Hernández quickly rebounded, however, holding the New York Yankees' potent offense to just two runs in six innings in his next start on April 19. He received a no decision, however, when Joe Borowski allowed six runs in the ninth inning to give the Yankees the win. Hernández settled into a groove and won his next five starts, allowing just six earned runs over 39 innings. During this streak, Hernández beat two-time American League Cy Young Award winner Johan Santana of the Minnesota Twins twice and pitched his first career complete game shutout. After one of these wins, Minnesota center fielder Torii Hunter was quoted as saying, "I can't wait until we face normal pitchers. This guy's sinker is practically unhittable."

On July 25, Hernández tossed eight shutout innings against the Boston Red Sox in a 1–0 Indians win. The victory improved his record to 5–0 in July. Hernández went on to go 19–8 with a 3.06 ERA and 215 innings pitched in 32 starts for the 2007 season.

True to his dominant 2007 regular season form, Hernández, in his first career postseason game in Game 2 of the 2007 ALDS against the Yankees and Andy Pettitte, allowed just one earned run on three hits over nine innings in an extra-inning win for Cleveland. On October 20, Hernández was battered by the Red Sox at Fenway Park in Game 6 of the 2007 ALCS, surrendering seven runs in two plus innings, including a first-inning grand slam by J.D. Drew. The Indians would go on to lose the game and the series, despite having led the series three games to one.

Hernández received serious consideration for the AL Cy Young award, along with teammate CC Sabathia, Boston's Josh Beckett, and the Angels' John Lackey. He ultimately finished fourth in 2007 AL Cy Young voting.

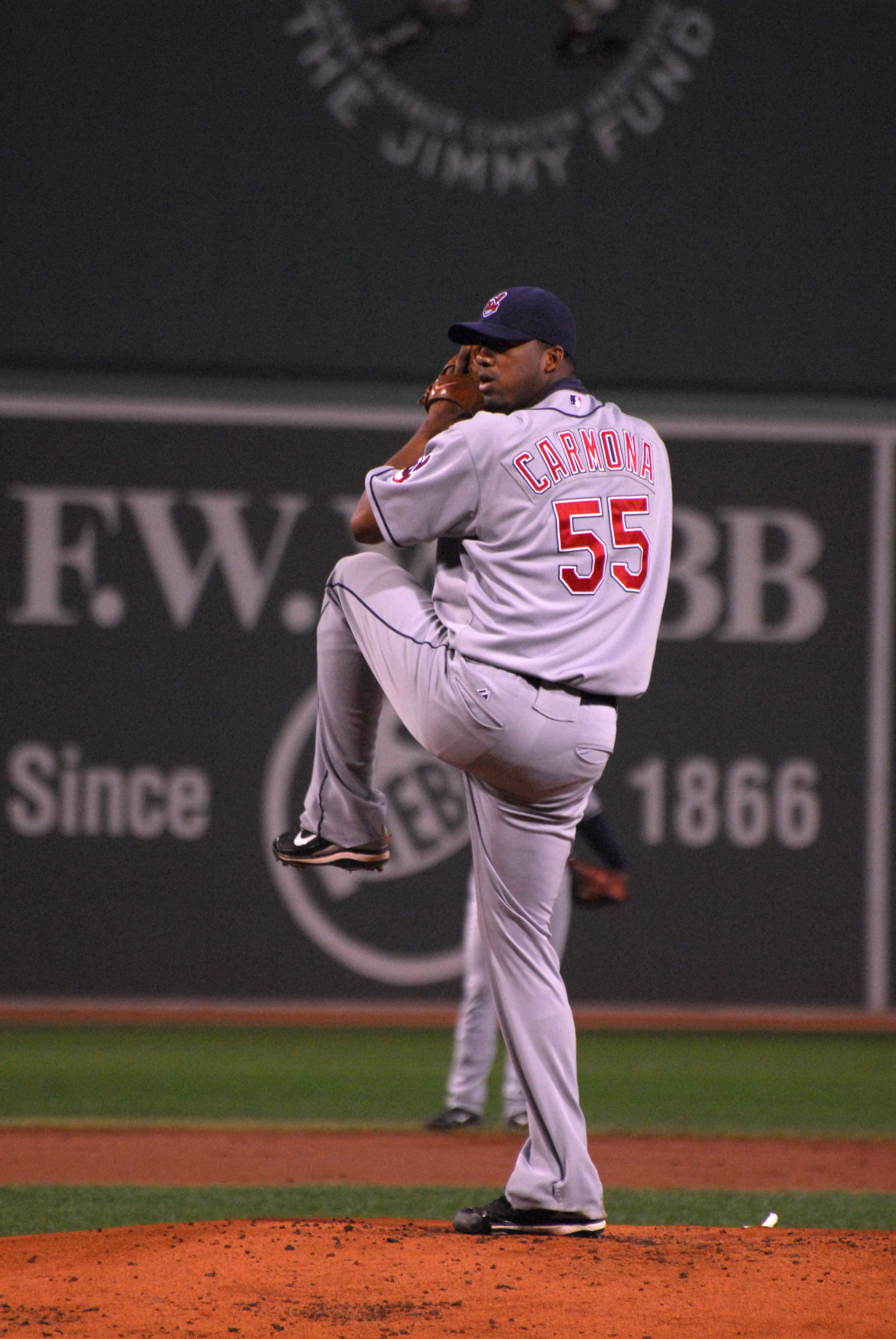
Hernández pitching for the Cleveland Indians in 2008

On April 10, 2008, the Indians signed Hernández to a four-year $15 million contract extension through 2011 with three individual club options through 2014. If all options had been exercised, Hernández would have made $43 million, with another $5 million available in escalators.

Hernández started the 2008 season off strong, going 4–2 with a 3.10 ERA in his first eight starts. On May 23, he left his start against the Texas Rangers with a left hip strain after running to cover first base. Hernández was placed on the disabled list the next day, where he remained for two months before making his return to the starting rotation on July 26.

On September 19 against Detroit, Hernández hit Gary Sheffield with a pitch. The two exchanged words as Sheffield walked to first base with his bat tucked under this arm. Before the next pitch, Hernández made a pick-off throw to first base. Sheffield again started exchanging words with Hernández, and this time charged the mound, inducing a bench-clearing brawl. Hernández was seen landing several punches to Sheffield's head, which left him bloodied. Hernández and Sheffield were both ejected, along with Indians catcher Víctor Martínez and Tigers second baseman Plácido Polanco. Hernández was suspended six games for his role in the brawl.

Hernández had a subpar 2009 season, starting 24 games for Cleveland, going 5–12 with 6.32 ERA. He struck out 79 batters in 125 1/3 innings. The Indians finished the year fourth in the AL Central with 65–97 record. In 2010, Hernández improved dramatically from 2009 and was honored with his first All Star selection. He had a 13–14 record with a 3.77 ERA, while striking out 124 batters in 210 1/3 innings.

On February 28, 2011, Indians manager Manny Acta announced that Hernández had been selected as the starter for Cleveland's season opener against the Chicago White Sox. The April 1 start would be his first on Opening Day.

In front of a sellout crowd of 41,721 fans at Cleveland's ballpark Progressive Field, Hernández started the 2011 season for the Indians. Hernández posted the worst opening day start in Major League history, as he became the first starting pitcher in 60 years to allow 10 runs in a team's first game. Hernández was the losing pitcher as he threw 88 pitches over three innings, in which he allowed 11 hits, two home runs, one walk, and 10 earned runs before leaving the game with an earned run average of 30.00. When pulled from the game, he was booed by fans. The last pitcher to allow 10-plus runs in an opener was Early Wynn of the Washington Senators, who accomplished the feat on April 19, 1948. In that game, Wynn surrendered 12 runs but managed to pitch 8 1/3 innings.

On July 16, 2012, Hernández was granted a visa to work in the U.S. On July 21, he began serving a three-week suspension delivered by the MLB for age and identity fraud. While he served the suspension, Hernandez was allowed to pitch simulated games and in the minors. He rejoined the Indians on August 11. Hernández started his first game since 2011 on August 15 against the Los Angeles Angels of Anaheim, allowing eight runs (five earned) on 10 hits in six innings in the 8–4 loss. He ended the season 0–3 with a 7.53 ERA in 14 1/3 innings. He became a free agent following the season.

=== Tampa Bay Rays ===
On December 18, 2012, Hernández signed a one-year, $3.25 million contract with the Tampa Bay Rays. He was named their number five starter before the 2013 season. Hernández recorded his first career win under his real name on April 21, allowing one run in six innings while striking out seven in an 8–1 victory over the Oakland Athletics. On July 30, Hernández recorded his first complete game with the Rays, a 5–2 defeat of the Arizona Diamondbacks. In 32 games (24 starts) with the Rays, he finished 6–13 with one save and a 4.89 ERA. He became a free agent following the season.

=== Philadelphia Phillies ===
On December 18, 2013, Hernández signed a one-year, $4.5 million contract with the Philadelphia Phillies. After five starts, during which he compiled a 5.81 ERA, he was available to pitch out of the bullpen, as off days meant the Phillies would not need him for over a week. Around that time, Phillies analyst Ricky Bottalico commented, "All in all, I like what I've seen from Roberto Hernández early in the ball games, but it's seems to be fourth, fifth, sixth innings, you're seeing a laboring guy out there. The one thing he's got to do is relax himself. It seems like he's trying to be a little too fine with his pitches. When you do that as a pitcher and you're not relaxed, you're going to make mistakes ... one thing he can do is take a deep breath. Getting deeper into games is getting tougher and tougher for him." Subsequently, he rebounded, and in 23 appearances (20 starts) with the Phillies, he posted a 6–8 record with an ERA of 3.87.

=== Los Angeles Dodgers ===
On August 7, 2014, Hernández was traded to the Los Angeles Dodgers for either two players to be named later or cash considerations (the players turned out to be minor leaguers Jesmuel Valentín and Víctor Arano). He made his first start as a Dodger the next day, allowing two runs in six innings against the Milwaukee Brewers. Hernández started nine games for the Dodgers, with a 2–3 record and 4.74 ERA. He became a free agent following the season.

=== Houston Astros ===
On February 12, 2015, Hernández signed a minor league contract with the Houston Astros. He had his contract selected to the major leagues on April 4. He was designated for assignment on July 29 to make room for Jed Lowrie, who was activated from the disabled list. At the time, Hernández was 3–5 with a 4.36 ERA in 20 games (11 starts). On August 7, the Astros placed him on release waivers.

=== Toronto Blue Jays ===
On December 18, 2015, Hernández signed a minor league contract with the Toronto Blue Jays that included an invitation to spring training and a March 28 opt-out. He exercised his March 28 opt-out after learning he would not make the Opening Day roster. Had he made the team out of spring training, the contract would have paid Hernández $1.25 million for the 2016 season. He signed another minor league contract with the Jays on April 20, and was to report to extended spring training. Hernández was assigned to the Triple-A Buffalo Bisons on April 27, and released on July 3.

=== Atlanta Braves ===
On July 15, 2016, Hernández signed a minor league contract with the Atlanta Braves. He was added to the Braves roster on August 6, and designated for assignment on August 12 after making two starts (1–1, 8.00 ERA). On October 4, 2016, Hernández elected free agency.

== Pitching style ==
Hernández was known for his hard sinker and exhibiting good control of his pitches. He did not throw exceptionally hard when he debuted in the minor leagues at age 21, but developed a fastball that could reach 97 mph. He also threw a slider and a changeup, but relied mostly on his hard sinker to get many ground ball outs.

== Name and age controversy ==
In January 2012, Dominican police arrested Hernández after he left the U.S. Consulate, accusing him of using a false identity to obtain a visa. Police reported his real name as Roberto Hernández Heredia, and that he was actually three years older than he reported. The Indians placed Hernández on the restricted list. Officials in both countries received assistance in the case from a woman in the Dominican Republic who claimed she falsified a birth certificate for Hernández in exchange for $26,000, but when Hernández's father failed to pay her, she contacted the authorities. Hernández claimed in an interview that he got the Fausto Carmona name from a distant relative, with whom he did not have a close relationship.

While he was known as Fausto Carmona, his birth date was given as December 7, 1983, which would have made him 22 years, 4 months old at the time of his MLB debut. Since being known by his real name, his birth date has been listed as August 30, 1980, by ESPN.com, MLB.com, and Retrosheet. That birth date indicates that he was actually 25 years, 7 months old at the time of his MLB debut.

Preceded by Andy Pettitte	American League Pitcher of the month September 2007	Succeeded by Cliff Lee
