= Claudio Manela =

Filipino baseball player (1894–1975)

- Pitcher
- Born: April 12, 1894; Cavite City, Philippines
- Died: November 1975; Newark, New Jersey, U.S.
- Threw: Left

Negro league baseball debut
- 1921, for the Cuban Stars (West)

Last appearance
- 1925, for the Cuban Stars (East)

NgL statistics
- Win–loss record: 4–10
- Earned run average: 4.19
- Strikeouts: 67

Teams
- Cuban Stars (West) (1921); Cuban Stars (East) (1925)

Claudio Manela (April 12, 1894 – November 1975) was a Filipino professional baseball pitcher in the Negro leagues in the 1920s. He was the first Filipino-born baseball player to play in a recognized major league, and the only Filipino or Asian player to play in the Negro Major Leagues.

A native of Cavite City, Philippines, Manela made his Negro leagues debut in 1921 with the Cuban Stars (West), and played for the Cuban Stars (East) in 1925. He also played minor league baseball in 1922 for the Hartford Senators, as well as Almendares of the Cuban League. Manela died in Newark, New Jersey in 1975 at age 81.
