= Alphonso Gerard =

U.S. Virgin Islander baseball player (1917–2002)

- Outfielder
- Born: June 26, 1917; Christiansted, U.S. Virgin Islands
- Died: July 14, 2002 (aged 85); Christiansted, U.S. Virgin Islands
- Batted: Left Threw: Left

Negro league baseball debut
- 1945, for the New York Black Yankees

Last appearance
- 1948, for the Chicago American Giants

Negro leagues statistics
- Batting average: .253
- Home runs: 0
- Runs batted in: 16
- Stats at Baseball Reference

Teams
- New York Black Yankees (1945, 1947); Indianapolis Clowns (1947); Chicago American Giants (1948)

Alphonso "Piggy" Gerard (June 26, 1917 – July 14, 2002) was a professional U.S. Virgin Islander baseball outfielder in the Negro leagues. He played professionally in the United States from 1945 to 1948 with the New York Black Yankees, Indianapolis Clowns, and the Chicago American Giants. He was born and died on Saint Croix. Gerard was the first Virgin Islander to play in a recognized major league, and the only one to play in the Negro Leagues.

Gerard also played professionally in Canada, spending in the Can-Am League and Provincial League, as well as Mexico (with the Tuneros de San Luis Potosí in 1946) and the Dominican Republic (with Escogido in 1953). Throughout his career, he played in the Puerto Rican Winter League with the Cangrejeros de Santurce, from the 1944–45 season until retiring after the winter of 1957–58.
