= List of countries by first MLB player =

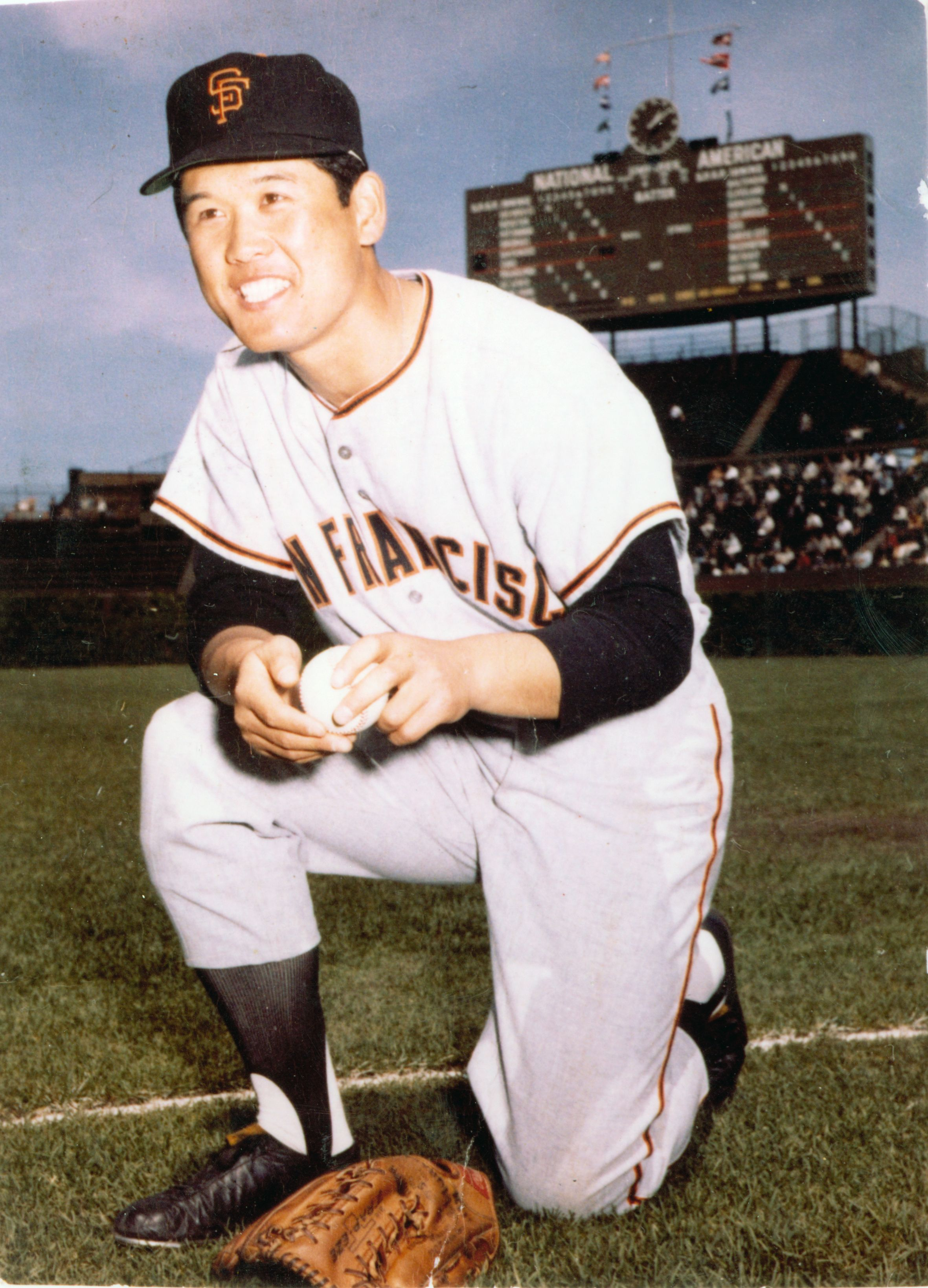
In 1964, Masanori Murakami became the first player born in Japan to appear in a major league game.

The following is a list of countries with their first major league baseball player. Listed are each country in which at least one current or former major league player was born, along with the name of the first person born in that country to play in a major league game, and the year and sports league of that player's major league debut.

== Background ==
The globalization of baseball has been occurring since its inception. After an influx of players from western Europe in early years, the major leagues came to see fewer European players and more players from Latin America. Players born in over 50 countries and on every continent except Antarctica have now appeared in major league games. Considerations:

- The list is based on players' birthplaces and each location's current country, per detailed records at Baseball-Reference.com. (Note: This approach is consistent with that of the Hockey Hall of Fame, generally followed for purposes of nationality classification in ice hockey, which classifies players by the currently existing countries in which their birthplaces are located.)
  - For example, a player born in Berlin would be included with other players born in present-day Germany, even if when the player was born it might have been part of East Germany or West Germany. (Note: A notable example is Al Campanis, the first Greek major league player; when he was born in 1916, his birthplace–the Greek island of Kos–was part of the Kingdom of Italy; Kos has been part of Greece since 1947.)
- The countries listed are generally consistent with those that compete in the Olympic Games. For example, Guam, Puerto Rico, and the U.S. Virgin Islands appear in the list.
- The players listed are not necessarily the first citizen of a country to play in a major league game, as nationality is determined under a country's nationality law and may differ.
- The list does not reflect where players grew up and learned to play baseball.
  - Some players on the list, despite their birth location, are or were Americans or Canadians who returned to their parents' home country as children and were raised there. One example is Harry Kingman, who was born in China but grew up in California.
  - Many European-born players on the list moved to North America as children. For example, the first person born in Italy to play in the major leagues, Lou Polli in 1932, moved with his family to Vermont at seven months of age. (Note: The first player born and raised in Italy to appear in the major leagues was Alex Liddi in 2011.)

== List ==
Listed players appeared in at least one game of a professional baseball major league according to the current inclusions of Major League Baseball:

- American Association (1882–1891)
- American League (1901–present)
- Federal League (1913–1915)
- National Association (1871–1875)
- National League (1876–present)
- Players' League (1890)
- Union Association (1884)
- Negro National League (I) (1920–1931)
- Eastern Colored League (1923–1928)
- American Negro League (1929)
- East–West League (1932)
- Negro Southern League (1932)
- Negro National League (II) (1933–1948)
- Negro American League (1937–1948)

The seven major Negro leagues from 1920 to 1948 were officially recognized by MLB as "major leagues" in December 2020. Note that the status of the National Association as a major league is in dispute. National Association players are included in the major league records of sites such as Baseball-Reference.com and Retrosheet and are included in this list.

The European countries highlighted in blue have had a least one player born there play in a major league game, through the 2019 season.

Country	Player	Debut		Ref.
Country	Player	Year	League	Ref.
Afghanistan	Jeff Bronkey‡	1993	American League	
American Samoa	Tony Solaita	1968	American League	
Aruba	Gene Kingsale	1996	American League	
at sea	Red Fisher‡	1910	American League	
Australia	Joe Quinn‡ (Note: The first player born and raised in Australia to appear in the major leagues was Craig Shipley in 1986.)	1884	Union Association	
Austria	Joe Hovlik‡	1909	American League	
Bahamas	Ormond Sampson	1932	Negro Southern League	
Belgium	Brian Lesher‡	1996	American League	
Belize	Chito Martinez	1991	American League	
Brazil	Yan Gomes	2012	American League	
Canada	Bob Addy	1871	National Association	
China	Harry Kingman‡	1914	American League	
Colombia	Lou Castro‡ (Note: The first player born and raised in Colombia to appear in the major leagues was Orlando Ramírez in 1974.)	1902	American League	
Cuba	Steve Bellán	1871	National Association	
Curaçao	Hensley Meulens	1989	American League	
Czech Republic	John Stedronsky‡ (Note: The territories of the modern-day Czech Republic were then part of the Austro-Hungarian Empire.)	1879	National League	
Denmark	Olaf Henriksen‡	1911	American League	
Dominican Republic	Pedro San	1926	Eastern Colored League	
Finland	John Michaelson‡	1921	American League	
France	Larry Ressler‡	1875	National Association	
Germany	George Heubel‡ (Note: The first player born and raised in Germany to appear in the major leagues was Max Kepler in 2015. Additionally, Donald Lutz, who was born in the United States but raised and developed in Germany, debuted in 2013.) (Note: Though Heubel was born in 1849, the modern state of Germany would not be created until 1871.)	1871	National Association	
Greece	Al Campanis‡	1943	National League	
Guam	John Hattig	2006	American League	
Hawaii (Note: Though Hawaii is now part of the United States, it was an independent country until 1895. Before gaining statehood in 1959, it also fielded its own national baseball team.)	Johnnie Williams	1914	American League	
Honduras	Gerald Young‡ (Note: The first player born and raised in Honduras to appear in the major leagues was Mauricio Dubón in 2019.)	1987	National League	
Hong Kong	Austin Brice‡	2016	National League	
Indonesia	Tom Mastny‡	2006	American League	
Ireland	Andy Leonard‡ (Note: The territories of modern-day Ireland were then part of the United Kingdom.)	1871	National Association	
Italy	Lou Polli‡	1932	American League	
Jamaica	Oscar Levis	1923	Eastern Colored League	
Japan	Masanori Murakami	1964	National League	
Latvia	Joe Zapustas‡	1933	American League	
Lithuania	Dovydas Neverauskas	2017	National League	
Mexico	Mel Almada	1933	American League	
Netherlands	Rynie Wolters‡ (Note: The first player born and raised in the Netherlands to appear in the major leagues was Win Remmerswaal in 1979.)	1871	National Association	
Nicaragua	Dennis Martínez	1976	American League	
Norway	John Anderson‡	1894	National League	
Panama	Victor Greenidge	1941	Negro National League (II)	
Peru	Jesús Luzardo‡	2019	American League	
Philippines	Claudio Manela	1921	Negro National League (I)	
Poland	Skel Roach‡	1899	National League	
Portugal	Frank Thompson	1875	National Association	
Puerto Rico	Gacho Torres	1926	Eastern Colored League	
Russia	Jake Gettman‡	1897	National League	
Saudi Arabia	Craig Stansberry‡	2007	National League	
Singapore	Robin Jennings‡	1996	National League	
Slovakia	Jack Quinn‡	1909	American League	
South Africa	Gift Ngoepe	2017	National League	
South Korea	Chan Ho Park	1994	National League	
Spain	Al Cabrera (Note: Immigrated to Cuba. Also technically the first African-born major leaguer, since he was born in the Canary Islands, an African possession of Spain.)	1913	National League	
Sweden	Charlie Hallstrom‡	1885	National League	
Switzerland	Otto Hess‡	1902	American League	
Taiwan	Chin-Feng Chen	2002	National League	
United Kingdom	George Hall†	1871	National Association	
United Kingdom	Harry Wright†	1871	National Association	
United States	multiple players (Note: There were 18 players–all born in the United States–in the first game of the National Association, played on 4 May 1871.)	1871	National Association	
U.S. Virgin Islands	Alphonso Gerard	1945	Negro National League (II)	
Venezuela	Alex Carrasquel	1939	American League	
Vietnam	Danny Graves‡	1996	American League	

† Hall and Wright both made their debut on 5 May 1871.
‡ Immigrated to, raised in, and/or developed in the United States.

== See also ==
- List of current Major League Baseball players by nationality
