= Tom Mastny =

American baseball player (born 1981)

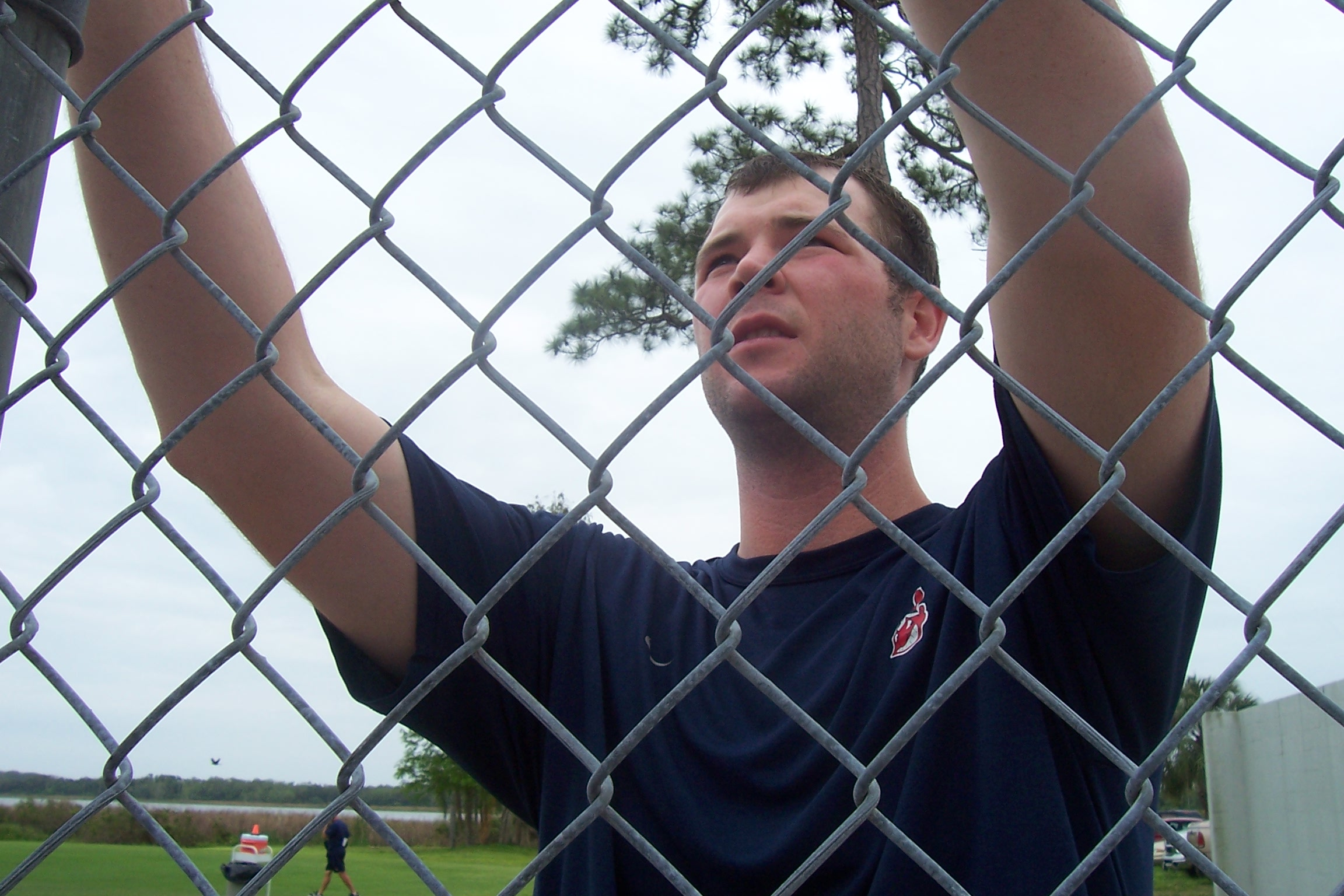
- Mastny signing autographs at Indians' Spring training 2008 in Winter Haven, Florida.
- Relief pitcher
- Born: February 4, 1981 (age 45); Bontang, Indonesia
- Batted: Right Threw: Right

MLB debut
- July 30, 2006, for the Cleveland Indians

Last MLB appearance
- September 25, 2008, for the Cleveland Indians

MLB statistics
- Win–loss record: 9–5
- Earned run average: 6.13
- Strikeouts: 85
- Stats at Baseball Reference

Teams
- Cleveland Indians (2006–2008); Yokohama BayStars (2009)

Thomas Raymond Mastny (born February 4, 1981) is an American former Major League Baseball right-handed relief pitcher. Mastny is the only Indonesian-born player in Major League history. He was raised in Zionsville, Indiana, where he played for Zionsville Community High School. He made his major league debut with the Indians on July 25, 2006.

== Career ==
Mastny, nicknamed "Mr. Nasty", was born in Bontang, Indonesia, and played collegiate baseball at Furman University, where he was primarily used as a starting pitcher. In 2003, he was named the Southern Conference Pitcher of the Year, but was not widely regarded as a top-tier prospect. Mastny was selected in the 11th round (320th overall) of the 2003 Major League Baseball draft by the Toronto Blue Jays. He began his professional career that year with the Auburn Doubledays of the Single-A New York–Penn League, going 8–0 with a 2.26 ERA in 14 starts. He also struck out 68 batters in 63 2/3 innings.

In 2004, Mastny played the entire season with the Single-A Charleston Alley Cats, going 10–3 with a 2.17 ERA in 27 starts.

On December 14, 2004, Mastny was sent to the Cleveland Indians to complete an earlier trade in which Toronto acquired infielder John McDonald.

After beginning the 2005 season in the starting rotation of the Single-A Kinston Indians, Mastny was converted into a relief role. He posted a 7–3 record, two saves and a 2.35 ERA in 29 games (11 starts) with Kinston before being promoted to the Double-A Akron Aeros. He remained with Akron to begin the 2006 season, before being called up for a stint in the bullpen of the Triple-A Buffalo Bisons. Mastny appeared in 36 games (one start) combined between Akron and Buffalo, going 2–2 with one save and a 2.01 ERA.

On July 24, 2006, the Indians purchased Mastny's contract from Triple-A Buffalo. Although still mostly unheralded as a prospect, due partly to his age (then 25), Mastny's career quickly accelerated that summer as the unexpectedly non-contending Indians began shuffling a bullpen that often struggled, particularly after the trade of closer Bob Wickman. The rookie pitcher—whose role with Akron and Buffalo was almost exclusively in middle relief, and who had recorded only three saves in the minors—was given an opportunity to close essentially by default, earning his first save with two scoreless innings against the Tampa Bay Devil Rays on August 19. That day, manager Eric Wedge announced that Mastny would be among those tried out in the role over the remainder of the season. He made 15 appearances for Cleveland in 2006, finishing 0–1 with five saves a 5.56 ERA.

Mastny spent the entire 2007 season with the Indians, posting a 7–2 record and a 4.68 ERA in 51 relief appearances. In the 2007 postseason, he catapulted onto the national scene after earning a victory in Game 2 of the 2007 American League Championship Series. Mastny was brought in to face the heart of the Red Sox lineup in the bottom of the tenth inning, in which he retired David Ortiz, Manny Ramírez, and Mike Lowell in order. The Indians would go on to score seven times in the top of the 11th, handing the victory to Mastny. He made three total appearances in the series, striking out three batters and walking two in 4 2/3 scoreless innings, but the Red Sox would go on to win the series in seven games.

After a spring training roster battle with Jorge Julio and Scott Elarton for Cleveland's final bullpen spot in 2008, Mastny was slotted to begin the season with Triple-A Buffalo. He was recalled on April 15, 2008, when Joe Borowski went on the 15-day disabled list. Mastny made his first career start on June 3, 2008, against the Texas Rangers. He took the loss, allowing five earned runs, including home runs to Josh Hamilton and Milton Bradley, in 1 1/3 innings. He was optioned to Buffalo after the game.

On December 7, 2008, the Indians sold Mastny's contract to the Yokohama BayStars of the Japanese Central League. Mastny had a 1–5 record with an ERA of 5.69 in 15 games for the BayStars in 2009.

== Birthplace confusion ==
Mastny's birthplace was briefly the source of some confusion after the Philadelphia Daily News's Paul Hagen reported on August 11, 2006, "it was discovered that the Cleveland Indians media guide lists Indiana-born reliever Tom Mastny as being from Indonesia". Hagen's quote was part of a brief that was syndicated on several Internet news sites and subsequently was repeated by other writers and bloggers. That same weekend, it was reported that members of the Society for American Baseball Research had contacted Mastny's father to confirm that, although the family hails from Indiana, the pitcher was indeed born on the Indonesian island of Borneo.

That the relatively unknown Mastny's biographical trivia would be subject to scrutiny is in part due to historical implications, as he is the first Indonesian-born player to reach the major leagues, as reported by ESPN columnist Keith Law:

Cleveland farmhand Tom Mastny was born in Indonesia, although it was to American parents who wanted to travel the world. The 6-5 [sic] Mastny has a fringe-average fastball but outstanding control, and with a good season so far between Double-A Akron and Triple-A Buffalo, he seems likely to become the first big leaguer born in Indonesia, which would become the 52nd country to produce a major league player.
