= Masanori Murakami =

Japanese baseball player (born 1944)

Masanori Murakami 村上 雅則
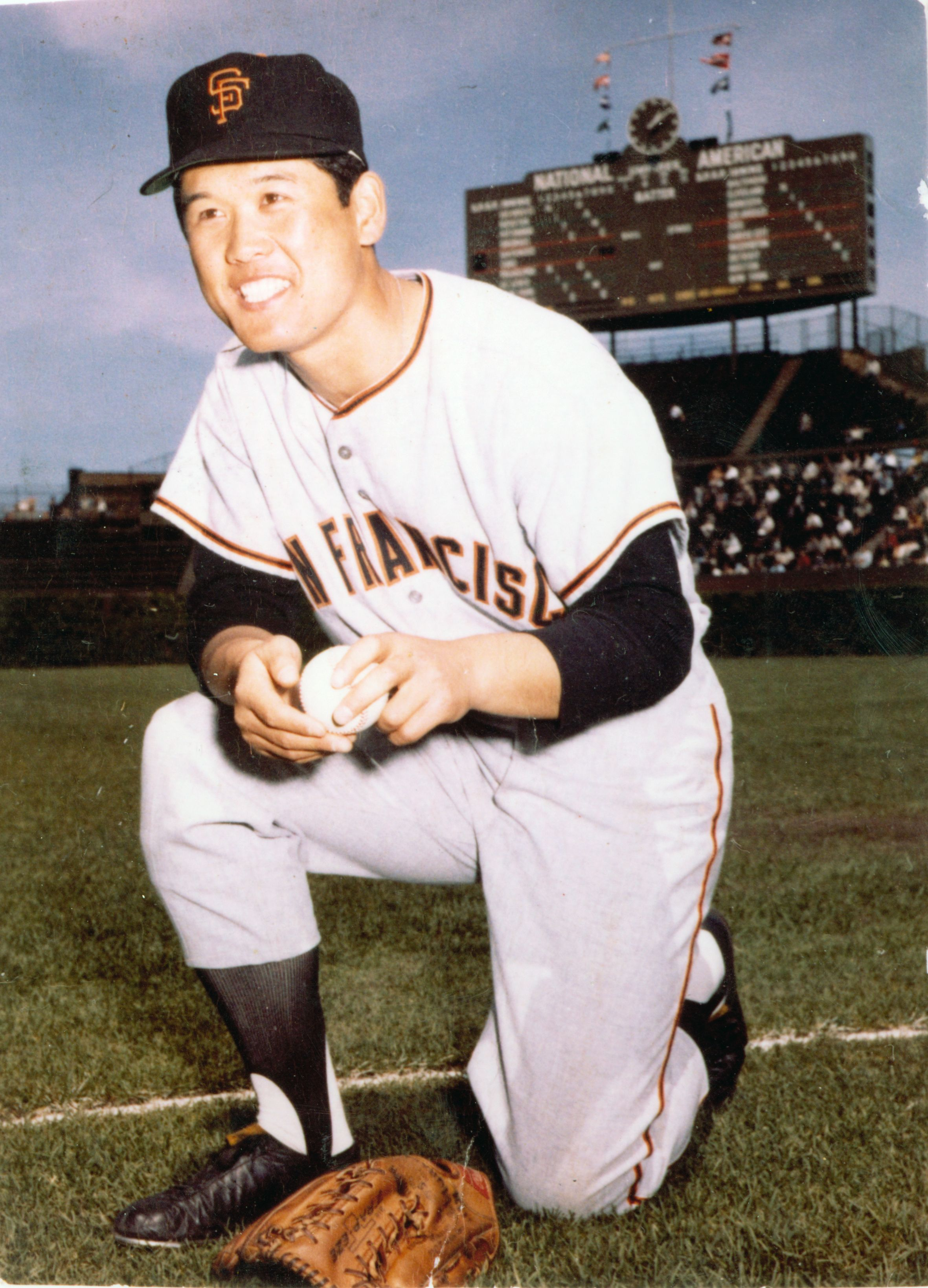
- Murakami with the San Francisco Giants in 1964, at Wrigley Field, Chicago
- Pitcher
- Born: May 6, 1944 (age 82); Ōtsuki, Yamanashi, Empire of Japan
- Batted: Left Threw: Left

Professional debut
- NPB: June 1, 1963, for the Nankai Hawks
- MLB: September 1, 1964, for the San Francisco Giants

Last appearance
- MLB: October 1, 1965, for the San Francisco Giants
- NPB: October 3, 1982, for the Nippon Ham Fighters

NPB statistics
- Win–loss record: 103–82
- Earned run average: 3.64
- Strikeouts: 758
- Saves: 30

MLB statistics
- Win–loss record: 5–1
- Earned run average: 3.43
- Strikeouts: 100
- Saves: 9
- Stats at Baseball Reference

Teams
- Nankai Hawks (1963); San Francisco Giants (1964–1965); Nankai Hawks (1966–1974); Hanshin Tigers (1975); Nippon-Ham Fighters (1976–1982)

Career highlights and awards
- First Japanese-born player in Major League Baseball

Masanori Murakami (村上 雅則, Murakami Masanori, born May 6, 1944), nicknamed "Mashi", is a Japanese former baseball pitcher. He is notable for being the first Japanese player to play for a Major League Baseball (MLB) team. Sent over to the United States by the Nankai Hawks, Murakami saw success as a reliever for the San Francisco Giants, debuting at the age of 20 in 1964. In 1965, he struck out over one batter per inning pitched, posted an ERA under 4 and earned eight saves. Following this season, however, Murakami headed back to the Nankai Hawks due to contractual obligations, where his success continued for another 17 years.

== Professional career ==
Murakami entered the Japanese Pacific League professional team, the Nankai Hawks, in September 1962, while still attending high school. In 1964, his team sent him, along with two other young players, to the San Francisco Giants single-A team Fresno as a baseball "exchange student". He was originally only scheduled to stay in the United States until June, but the Hawks neglected to call him back to Japan, and he stayed with the Giants for the rest of the season.

In August of the same year, he was promoted to the majors, and on September 1, 1964, he made his major league debut, becoming the first Japanese player to play in the major leagues. He entered the ninth inning against the New York Mets and pitched to four batters, striking out two and allowing just one hit and zero runs. He pitched the final three innings of an 11-inning 5-4 win by the Giants on September 29 over the Houston Colt .45s to get his first career win. In nine games with the Giants, he pitched a total of 15 innings while allowing eight hits and three runs (with all of the runs occurring in his final game on October 4) while having 15 strikeouts and one walk for a 1.80 ERA.

Murakami's performance caused the Giants to refuse the Hawks' order to return him to Japan. The argument escalated during the 1964 off-season. Finally, Yushi Uchimura, the commissioner of Nippon Professional Baseball, was called in to make the final decision on which team Murakami would play with. The commissioner made a compromise; Murakami would return to the Hawks after he had played for another full season with the Giants.

During his second and final campaign with the Giants, he collected the only two hits of his MLB career. The first was a leadoff bunt single off Sandy Koufax in the third inning of a 9–3 home loss to the Los Angeles Dodgers on 29 June 1965. He wore number 10 with the San Francisco Giants. He appeared in 45 games, pitching a total of 74.1 innings while going 4-1 with a 3.75 ERA, 85 strikeouts and 22 walks. His total record in two years in MLB was 5–1, 9 saves, with a 3.43 ERA in 54 games.

Murakami returned to the Hawks in 1966, but failed to live up to the team's high expectations. He proved himself by winning 18 games in 1968, and contributed to the team's league championship in 1973, but was traded to the Hanshin Tigers in the 1974 off-season. He did not pitch well, and the Tigers released him after one year, but the Nippon Ham Fighters picked him up. He made a comeback in 1978, winning 12 games, and contributing to the team's league championship in 1981. Murakami retired in 1982.

== Player profile ==
=== Pitching style ===
Murakami was not an overpowering pitcher. His fastball was in the low to mid 80 mph range. His best pitch was a screwball, which he learned in the majors, and he also threw a changeup and curve. Also his rhythm offset major league batters, returning the next pitch quickly after the ball was thrown back to him. He was a reliever, being a left-hander throwing from the sidearm.

=== Language skills ===
Murakami could barely speak or understand English when he first came to the United States, and always had a dictionary on hand to communicate with teammates. When promoted to the majors, he was told to go to New York City (where the San Francisco Giants were playing), and was given his plane ticket on the spot. In New York, he signed a major league contract even though he could not read a single word written on the contract.

The authors of 1973's semi-satirical reference, The Great American Baseball Card Flipping, Trading and Bubble Gum Book, stated that Murakami was "with the possible exception of Yogi Berra, the only major league ballplayer who did not speak English."

== Post-baseball life ==
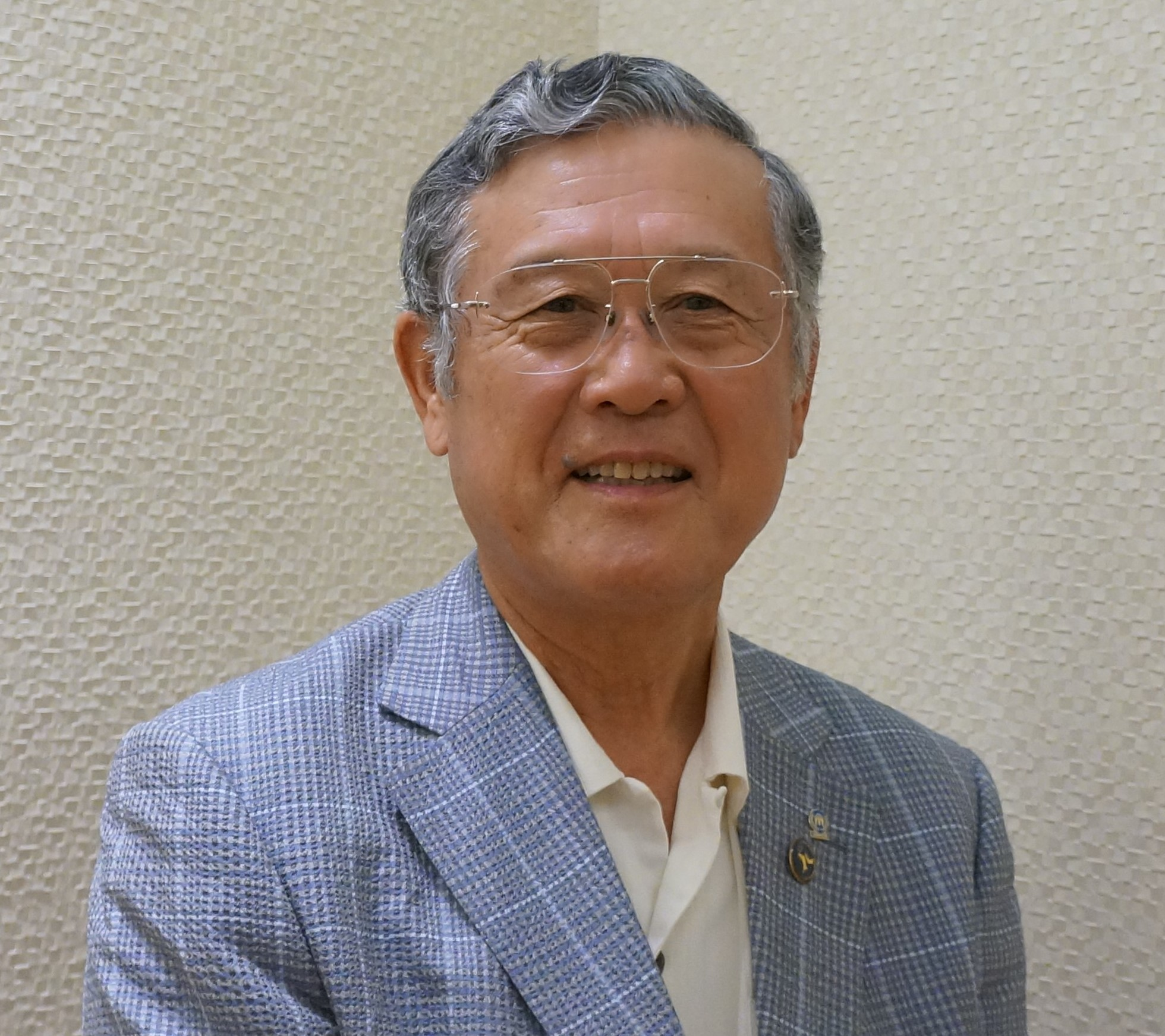
Murakami in 2018

After retirement as a player, Murakami returned to the San Francisco Giants spring camp in 1983. He was not signed as a player, but became a batting practice pitcher for Giants' home games.

Murakami worked as a commentator from 1984 to 1986, and became a minor league pitching coach for the Nippon Ham Fighters from 1987 to 1988. He also served as a pitching coach for the Fukuoka Daiei Hawks and Seibu Lions. He also briefly worked as a scout for the San Francisco Giants, and is now a commentator for NPB games broadcast on NHK, and writes for the Daily Sports newspaper.

Additionally, Murakami spent over a decade as a founding board member for the Special Olympics Japan, promoting understanding about people with mental disabilities in Japan. He served as an advisor to the U.N. High Commissioner for Refugees in Japan and organized an annual golf charity competition that raises funds for good causes, including for victims the 9/11 terrorist attack. He promoted diversity by serving as the manager of Japan's national women's baseball team.

In 2004, Murakami was presented with the Foreign Minister's Certificate of Commendation in commemoration of the 150th anniversary of the Japan-US relationship by the Ministry of Foreign Affairs of Japan.

Murakami was honored by the San Francisco Giants at AT&T Park on Friday, May 16, 2008, when a limited edition Murakami bobblehead was given away at the evening game against the Chicago White Sox as part of the team's "Japanese Heritage Night" promotion. He was again honored on the 50th anniversary of his debut on Friday, May 15, 2014 during the team's "Japanese Heritage Night" promotion and game attendees were given a figurine-style bust of Murakami, and threw out the first pitch of the game.

In 2025, Murakami threw the ceremonial pitch at an exhibition game between the Chicago Cubs and the Hanshin Tigers at Tokyo Dome.

== See also ==
- List of Major League Baseball players from Japan
- List of countries with their first Major League Baseball player
