= Oscar Levis =

Jamaicanbaseball player (1898–1983)

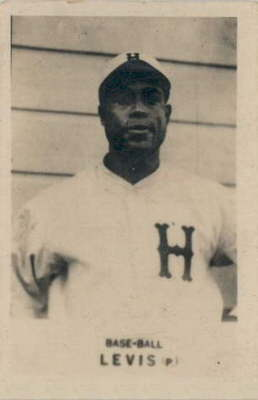
- Pitcher
- Born: August 7, 1898; Oracabessa, Jamaica
- Died: May 24, 1983 (aged 84); Norfolk, Virginia, U.S.
- Batted: Right Threw: Right

Negro league baseball debut
- 1921, for the Cuban Stars (East)

Last appearance
- 1931, for the Hilldale Club

Teams
- Cuban Stars (East) (1921–1929); Hilldale Club (1930–1931)

Oscar Joseph "Chick" Levis (August 7, 1898 – May 24, 1983), born Oscar Joseph Levy, was a Jamaican professional baseball pitcher in the Negro leagues. He played from 1921 to 1931 with the Cuban Stars (East) and the Hilldale Club. He was the first Jamaican ballplayer to play in a recognized major league.

Recent research into Levis's family history uncovered that Levis was Jewish, having a Jewish father, and identified as such.

== See also ==
- List of Jewish Major League Baseball players
