= Pedro San =

Dominican baseball player (born 1895)

- Pitcher
- Born: 1895; Monte Cristi, Dominican Republic
- Died: January 12, 1943; La Romana, Dominican Republic
- Batted: Right Threw: Right

Eastern Colored League debut
- 1926, for the Cuban Stars (East)

Last appearance
- 1928, for the Cuban Stars (East)

Negro league statistics
- Win–loss record: 16–18
- Earned run average: 5.38
- Strikeouts: 127

Teams
- Cuban Stars (East) (1926–1928)

Alejandro Pedro San (1895 – January 12, 1943) was a Dominican professional baseball pitcher in the Negro leagues in the 1920s. He was the first Dominican ballplayer to play in a recognized major league.

A native of Monte Cristi, Dominican Republic, San made his Negro leagues debut in 1926 with the Cuban Stars (East). He went on to play two more seasons with the Stars through 1928.
