= Joe Borowski (baseball) =

American baseball player (born 1971)

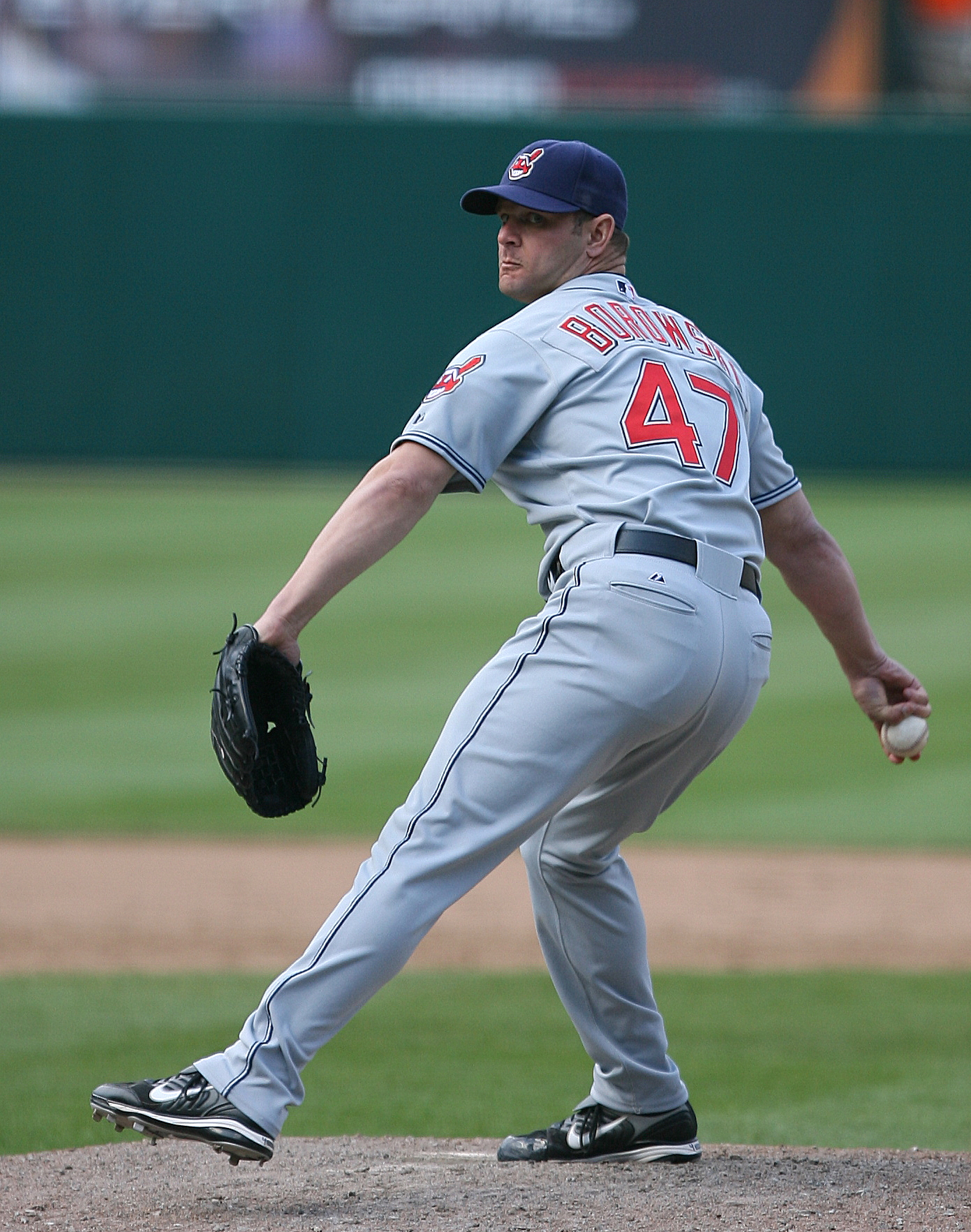
- Borowski with the Cleveland Indians in 2007
- Pitcher
- Born: May 4, 1971 (age 54); Bayonne, New Jersey, U.S.
- Batted: Right Threw: Right

MLB debut
- July 9, 1995, for the Baltimore Orioles

Last MLB appearance
- July 1, 2008, for the Cleveland Indians

MLB statistics
- Win–loss record: 22–34
- Earned run average: 4.18
- Strikeouts: 372
- Saves: 131
- Stats at Baseball Reference

Teams
- Baltimore Orioles (1995); Atlanta Braves (1996–1997); New York Yankees (1997–1998); Chicago Cubs (2001–2005); Tampa Bay Devil Rays (2005); Florida Marlins (2006); Cleveland Indians (2007–2008)

Career highlights and awards
- AL saves leader (2007)

Joseph Thomas Borowski (born May 4, 1971) is an American sports broadcaster for the Arizona Diamondbacks and former professional right-handed relief pitcher in Major League Baseball. He played in Major League Baseball for the Baltimore Orioles, Atlanta Braves, New York Yankees, Chicago Cubs, Tampa Bay Devil Rays, Florida Marlins, and Cleveland Indians.

== Career ==
=== High school career ===
Borowski grew up in Bayonne, New Jersey, attended Marist High School and was an All-America selection in both football and baseball and a two-time All-State selection in both sports. He attended Rutgers University in New Jersey.

=== Major League Baseball career ===
Borowski was drafted in the 32nd round (823rd overall) of the 1989 Major League Baseball draft by the Chicago White Sox. On March 31, 1991, he was traded to the Baltimore Orioles in exchange for Pete Rose Jr. Borowski made his major league debut for the Orioles on July 9, 1995, against his former team, the White Sox. He tossed a scoreless ninth inning to close out an 11–2 Orioles win. Borowski made six appearances for the Orioles in 1995, recording a 1.23 ERA.

On December 17, 1995, Borowski was traded to the Atlanta Braves along with pitcher Chaad Stewart in exchange for starting pitcher Kent Mercker. In Atlanta, Borowski split time between the majors and the Triple-A Richmond Braves. He was later claimed off waivers by the New York Yankees on September 15, 1997. He made one appearance for the Yankees that season on September 18 against the Detroit Tigers, recording the loss after allowing two earned runs and walking four batters in two innings in a 9–7, 11-inning loss. In 1998, Borowski made eight appearances with the Yankees, going 1–0 with a 6.52 ERA.

Borowski spent the 1999 season in the Milwaukee Brewers organization, going 6–2 with four saves and a 5.46 ERA in 58 games for the Triple-A Louisville RiverBats. On November 9, 1999, he signed with the Cincinnati Reds, but was later released on March 21, 2000. Borowski then spent the 2000 season pitching in the Mexican League for the Monterrey Sultanes and in the Atlantic League of Professional Baseball for the Newark Bears.

On December 11, 2000, Borowski signed with the Chicago Cubs. Before his second year with the Cubs in 2002, Borowski had never appeared in more than 25 games, but when given a chance to appear frequently he did very well. Between his stints with the Yankees and Cubs, he worked as a firefighter. In 2002, he went 4–4 with two saves and a 2.73 ERA in 73 games of relief. The next year, he was converted to the closer role for the Cubs and was exceptional, going 2–2 with a 2.63 ERA and recording 33 saves in 37 opportunities, helping the Cubs win their division and reach the NLCS before being eliminated by the eventual World Series champion Florida Marlins. In 2004, Borowski started the season poorly, going 2–4 with an 8.02 ERA in 22 games and recording nine saves in 11 opportunities. In June, it was announced that he had suffered a partial tear in his right rotator cuff, which later ended his season. During spring training in 2005, Borowski broke his wrist on a come-backer lined directly at him. After missing seven weeks, he returned to the Cubs on May 20. He did not have his old closer job back, though, as Ryan Dempster had emerged as the club's new closer. On June 29, 2005, Borowski was designated for assignment by the Cubs, and he was subsequently released. At the time, he had posted a 6.55 ERA in 11 relief appearances.

On July 11, 2005, Borowski signed with the Tampa Bay Devil Rays, who used him as a set-up man to closer Danys Báez. While with the Devil Rays, Borowski went on a tear, pitching a franchise record 21 scoreless innings, and is seen by many as the catalyst for the Devil Rays' second half turnaround, as his inspired performance helped stabilize the Rays' otherwise shaky bullpen. However, in his last 14 appearances, he gave up 15 runs, raising his ERA from 2.25 to 4.47. Borowski was designated for assignment by the Devil Rays in early December, and then non-tendered by the team on December 22.

On December 29, 2005, Borowski signed a one-year deal with the Florida Marlins. He spent the season as the Marlins' closer, going 3–3 with a 3.75 ERA in 72 relief appearances while converting 36 out of 43 save opportunities. After the season, Borowski agreed to a multi-year contract with the Philadelphia Phillies, but the deal later fell apart after concerns over the status of his right shoulder.

On December 6, 2006, Borowski signed a one-year, $4.25 million contract with the Cleveland Indians that included a club option for 2008. The signing of Borowski filled the vacant closer role for Cleveland. During the 2007 season, Borowski got off to a slow start as closer for the Indians, posting an earned run average of 13.50 in his first seven outings. His struggles were capped off after surrendering six runs to the New York Yankees on April 19, 2007, in the ninth inning after coming into the game with a four-run lead. Borowski was not charged with a blown save in this outing, since a three-run lead or smaller is required for a pitcher to earn the save. He finished the season 4–5 and led the American League with 45 saves in 69 relief appearances, but had an ERA of 5.07, which was the highest ever for a closer with 40 or more saves.

On November 6, 2007, the Indians exercised Borowski's $4 million club option, opting to bring him back in 2008. Had the team declined Borowski's option, he would have been paid a $250,000 buyout.

In 2008, Borowski got off to a bad start to the season. Putting up an 18.00 ERA with two blown saves through five appearances, he averaged a walk, two hits, and two runs per appearance. Following another dreadful appearance in which he gave up three earned runs in 2/3 inning on April 14, the Indians put him on the 15-day disabled list with a strained triceps.

Borowski was designated for assignment by the Indians on July 4, and released on July 10, 2008.

On February 24, 2009, Borowski announced his retirement.

== Personal life ==
Borowski currently resides in Scottsdale, Arizona, with his wife Tatum and two sons Blaze and Ty.

He accepted an award in 2004 from the Polish American Police Association as a distinguished Polish-American.

== See also ==
- List of Major League Baseball annual saves leaders
