= Hermansen =

Hermansen is a surname. Notable people with the surname include:

- Chad Hermansen (born 1977), former Major League Baseball outfielder
- Chris Hermansen (born 1975), retired Danish football player
- Edith Hermansen (1907–1988), Danish film actress
- Even Helte Hermansen (born 1982), Norwegian guitarist
- Henry Hermansen (1921–1997), Norwegian cross country skier who competed in the 1950s
- Mads Hermansen (born 2000), Danish footballer
- Ole Hermansen (1893–1942), Norwegian trade unionist
- Omar Hermansen (1913–1998), Danish boxer who competed in the 1936 Summer Olympics
- Robert Hermansen (born 1939), Norwegian former CEO of Store Norske Spitsbergen Kulkompani
- Tor Erik Hermansen of Stargate (record producers), based in Los Angeles
- Tormod Hermansen (born 1940), former CEO of Telenor and State Secretary of Finansdepartementet (1978–1979)

== See also ==
- Murder of Benjamin Hermansen (1985–2001), Norwegian-Ghanaian boy whose father was born in Ghana, his mother was Norwegian
- Hermansen Island (Norwegian: Hermansenøya), an island in Oscar II Land at Spitsbergen, Svalbard
- Hermansen Island Bird Sanctuary (Norwegian: Hermansenøya fuglereservat), a bird reserve at Svalbard, Norway
- Hermannsson
- Hermanson
- Hermansson
