= Hermansson =

Hermansson is a surname. Notable people with the surname include:

- Alexander Hermansson (ice hockey) (born 1988), professional Swedish ice hockey goaltender
- Alexander Hermansson (entertainer), (born 1992), Swedish YouTube and television presenter
- Andreas Hermansson (born 1973), Swedish football player
- Ann-Sofie Hermansson (born 1964), Swedish politician of the Social Democrats
- Bo Hermansson (born 1937), Swedish film director and screenwriter
- C.-H. Hermansson (1917–2016), former Swedish politician
- Daniel Hermansson (born 1982), Swedish professional ice hockey player
- Fredrik Hermansson (born 1976), Swedish musician
- Hanna Hermansson (born 1989), Swedish runner
- Herbert Hermansson (1906–1984), Swedish politician
- Jack Hermansson (born 1988), Swedish professional mixed martial artist
- Jan Hermansson (1942–2019), one of the first aikido pioneers in Sweden
- Kakan Hermansson (born 1981), Swedish television presenter, radio host, comedian and artist
- Kevin Hermansson (born 1990), Swedish rower and part of the Swedish rowing team
- Michaela Hermansson (born 1990), Swedish football midfielder
- Terry Hermansson (born 1967), former New Zealand rugby league player
- Mia Hermansson-Högdahl (born 1965), Swedish team handball player
- Jens Hermansson Juel or Jens Juel (1580–1634), Danish nobleman, Governor-general of Norway 1618–1629

== See also ==
- Hermannsson
- Hermansen
- Hermanson
