= 2005 Chicago White Sox season =

Major League Baseball season

2005 Chicago White Sox
- World Series champions American League champions American League Central champions
- League: American League
- Division: Central
- Ballpark: U.S. Cellular Field
- City: Chicago
- Record: 99–63 (.611)
- Divisional place: 1st
- Owners: Jerry Reinsdorf
- General manager: Kenny Williams
- Manager: Ozzie Guillén
- Television: WGN-TV; Comcast Sportsnet (Ken Harrelson, Darrin Jackson)
- Radio: WMVP (John Rooney, Ed Farmer); WRTO (AM) (Hector Molina)

The 2005 Chicago White Sox season was the White Sox's 105th season. They finished with a record of 99 wins and 63 losses during the regular season and won the American League Central six games over the Cleveland Indians. In the playoffs, they won the American League Division Series 3–0 over the defending World Series Champions the Boston Red Sox; the American League Championship Series 4–1 over the Los Angeles Angels of Anaheim; and swept the Houston Astros in the World Series, ending the 88-year-long Curse of the Black Sox championship drought.

== Offseason ==
- December 9, 2004: Jermaine Dye was signed as a free agent by the White Sox.
- December 9, 2004: Dustin Hermanson was signed as a free agent by the White Sox.
- December 13, 2004: Carlos Lee was traded by the White Sox to the Milwaukee Brewers for Scott Podsednik, Luis Vizcaíno and a player to be named later. The Brewers completed the deal by sending Travis Hinton (minors) to the White Sox on January 10, 2005.
- December 17, 2004: Bobby Jenks was claimed off waivers by the White Sox from the Los Angeles Angels of Anaheim.
- January 3, 2005: Orlando Hernández was signed as a free agent by the White Sox.
- January 6, 2005: A. J. Pierzynski was signed as a free agent by the White Sox.
- January 27, 2005: Tadahito Iguchi was signed as a free agent by the White Sox.

== Regular season ==
The Chicago White Sox had a total attendance of 2,342,833 in 2005, 7th in the American League.

=== The manager ===
Much that happened in 2005 was under the direction of manager Ozzie Guillén. After his inaugural season in 2004, in which his club went 83–79 and finished second in the American League Central Division, Guillén approached general manager Kenny Williams. He asked Williams for a makeover for his club. Guillén envisioned his team playing small ball.

Williams agreed with Guillén. The Sox already had a feisty manager, solid pitching, and power hitters. The Sox decided to clean up a bit and bring in players with the team first attitude. Guillén wanted more quickness, so speedy Scott Podsednik was brought in to be the number one hitter and to create havoc for opposing pitchers. Guillén wanted pitching, so Williams got Freddy García, Orlando "El Duque" Hernández, Luis Vizcaíno, Dustin Hermanson, and in July, hard throwing closer Bobby Jenks was brought up from the minor leagues.

Another important factor to Guillén's new plan was to have players who put the team ahead of personal accomplishments. Jermaine Dye was added for veteran leadership and provided an important bat and glove in the lineup. Tadahito Iguchi came in from Japan to play second base and bat second behind Podsednik. Iguchi proved his value all year long.

Finally, the Sox decided to add a little fire into a mostly laid back and quiet clubhouse. This need brought catcher A. J. Pierzynski to Chicago after playing six years for division rival Minnesota, and one year for San Francisco.

=== Season summary ===
The White Sox began their season by winning the first two games, and were 7–3 after the first 10 games. They won 19 out of their next 24, including two 8-game winning streaks, and at the end of April were 17–7. In mid-May, after beating the Texas Rangers 2 of 3 games, they also took two of three from the Chicago Cubs, but got swept by the Texas Rangers in a two-game series after splitting four games with eventual American League Championship Series opponent Los Angeles Angels of Anaheim. Finishing May with a 35–17 record, the Sox, in interleague play, swept both the Colorado Rockies and Los Angeles Dodgers, but did lose the other series to the Cubs two games to one. At the end of June they were 53–24, and just before the All-star break, the Sox were swept by the Oakland Athletics in a 3-game series at home, going into the break at 57–29. Then, after the break, they swept the Cleveland Indians in a four-game series, shutting out the Indians twice and scoring seven runs in the other two games. At the end of July they were 68–35, a 14 1/2-game lead in the American League Central over both Cleveland and the Minnesota Twins. However, from August 12 through August 23, they lost 8 out of 9 games they played, including a 7-game losing streak and sweeps at the hands of the Boston Red Sox and Twins, while Cleveland, who had been in second place for the majority of the season, suddenly started playing their best baseball of the year and putting pressure on the Sox. Finishing strong, though, the White Sox began September by winning their first 7 games and ended the season by winning 8 of 10. They finished the regular season with a 99–63 record and a 6-game lead over Cleveland, winning their second American League Central title. The White Sox remained in first place in the division for the entire season (making their postseason World Series victory a wire-to-wire win); they ended the season with the best record in the AL and the second best record in the major leagues. Their best hitter in terms of statistics was first baseman Paul Konerko, who hit 40 home runs, had 100 runs batted in, and hit .283 on the season.

=== Opening Day lineup ===
Roster
| Position | Player |
|---|---|
| LF | Scott Podsednik |
| 2B | Tadahito Iguchi |
| DH | Carl Everett |
| 1B | Paul Konerko |
| RF | Jermaine Dye |
| CF | Aaron Rowand |
| C | A. J. Pierzynski |
| 3B | Joe Crede |
| SS | Juan Uribe |
| P | Mark Buehrle |

=== Season standings ===
AL Central
| Team | W | L | Pct. | GB | Home | Road |
|---|---|---|---|---|---|---|
| Chicago White Sox | 99 | 63 | .611 | — | 47‍–‍34 | 52‍–‍29 |
| Cleveland Indians | 93 | 69 | .574 | 6 | 43‍–‍38 | 50‍–‍31 |
| Minnesota Twins | 83 | 79 | .512 | 16 | 45‍–‍36 | 38‍–‍43 |
| Detroit Tigers | 71 | 91 | .438 | 28 | 39‍–‍42 | 32‍–‍49 |
| Kansas City Royals | 56 | 106 | .346 | 43 | 34‍–‍47 | 22‍–‍59 |

=== Record vs. opponents ===
| Team | W-L Record |
|---|---|
| Baltimore Orioles | 6–2 |
| Boston Red Sox | 3–4 |
| Cleveland Indians | 14–5 |
| Detroit Tigers | 14–5 |
| Kansas City Royals | 13–5 |
| Los Angeles Angels of Anaheim | 4–6 |
| Minnesota Twins | 11–7 |
| New York Yankees | 3–3 |
| Oakland Athletics | 2–7 |
| Seattle Mariners | 6–3 |
| Tampa Bay Devil Rays | 4–2 |
| Texas Rangers | 3–6 |
| Toronto Blue Jays | 4–2 |
| Arizona Diamondbacks | 1–2 |
| Chicago Cubs | 3–3 |
| Colorado Rockies | 3–0 |
| Los Angeles Dodgers | 3–0 |
| San Diego Padres | 2–1 |
| Interleague Play | 12–6 |

2005 American League record Source: MLB Standings Grid – 2005
| Team | BAL | BOS | CWS | CLE | DET | KC | LAA | MIN | NYY | OAK | SEA | TB | TEX | TOR | NL |
|---|---|---|---|---|---|---|---|---|---|---|---|---|---|---|---|
| Baltimore | — | 8–10 | 2–6 | 1–6 | 3–5 | 4–2 | 2–4 | 3–3 | 7–11 | 4–6 | 7–3 | 12–6 | 4–6 | 9–10 | 8–10 |
| Boston | 10–8 | — | 4–3 | 4–2 | 6–4 | 4–2 | 6–4 | 4–2 | 9–10 | 6–4 | 3–3 | 13–6 | 7–2 | 7–11 | 12–6 |
| Chicago | 6–2 | 3–4 | — | 14–5 | 14–5 | 13–5 | 4–6 | 11–7 | 3–3 | 2–7 | 6–3 | 4–2 | 3–6 | 4–2 | 12–6 |
| Cleveland | 6–1 | 2–4 | 5–14 | — | 12–6 | 13–6 | 3–5 | 10–9 | 3–4 | 6–3 | 7–3 | 4–6 | 3–3 | 4–2 | 15–3 |
| Detroit | 5–3 | 4–6 | 5–14 | 6–12 | — | 10–9 | 4–6 | 8–11 | 1–5 | 1–5 | 5–4 | 5–2 | 4–2 | 4–3 | 9–9 |
| Kansas City | 2–4 | 2–4 | 5–13 | 6–13 | 9–10 | — | 2–7 | 6–13 | 3–3 | 2–4 | 2–7 | 3–5 | 2–8 | 3–6 | 9–9 |
| Los Angeles | 4–2 | 4–6 | 6–4 | 5–3 | 6–4 | 7–2 | — | 6–4 | 6–4 | 10–9 | 9–9 | 4–5 | 15–4 | 1–5 | 12–6 |
| Minnesota | 3–3 | 2–4 | 7–11 | 9–10 | 11–8 | 13–6 | 4–6 | — | 3–3 | 4–6 | 6–4 | 6–0 | 3–6 | 4–2 | 8–10 |
| New York | 11–7 | 10–9 | 3–3 | 4–3 | 5–1 | 3–3 | 4–6 | 3–3 | — | 7–2 | 7–3 | 8–11 | 7–3 | 12–6 | 11–7 |
| Oakland | 6–4 | 4–6 | 7–2 | 3–6 | 5–1 | 4–2 | 9–10 | 6–4 | 2–7 | — | 12–6 | 4–5 | 11–8 | 5–5 | 10–8 |
| Seattle | 3–7 | 3–3 | 3–6 | 3–7 | 4–5 | 7–2 | 9–9 | 4–6 | 3–7 | 6–12 | — | 4–2 | 6–13 | 4–6 | 10–8 |
| Tampa Bay | 6–12 | 6–13 | 2–4 | 6–4 | 2–5 | 5–3 | 5–4 | 0–6 | 11–8 | 5–4 | 2–4 | — | 6–2 | 8–11 | 3–15 |
| Texas | 6–4 | 2–7 | 6–3 | 3–3 | 2–4 | 8–2 | 4–15 | 6–3 | 3–7 | 8–11 | 13–6 | 2–6 | — | 7–3 | 9–9 |
| Toronto | 10–9 | 11–7 | 2–4 | 2–4 | 3–4 | 6–3 | 5–1 | 2–4 | 6–12 | 5–5 | 6–4 | 11–8 | 3–7 | — | 8–10 |

=== Notable transactions ===
- June 7, 2005: Lance Broadway was drafted by the White Sox in the 1st round (15th pick) of the 2005 Major League Baseball draft. Player signed June 13, 2005.
- July 31, 2005: White Sox acquire utility infielder Geoff Blum from the San Diego Padres in return for a left-handed minor-league pitcher named Ryan Meaux. This trade got in just before the trade deadline and at the time seemed "anonymous" and "unspectacular". However, the White Sox were rewarded later that postseason as Blum emerged as the unlikely hero by hitting the winning home run in the top of the 14th inning in Game 3 of the 2005 World Series.

=== Roster ===
2005 Chicago White Sox
Roster
| Pitchers: 37 Jon Adkins; 57 Jeff Bajenaru; 56 Mark Buehrle; 52 José Contreras; 46 Neal Cotts; 34 Freddy García; 20 Jon Garland; 32 Dustin Hermanson; 26 Orlando Hernández; 45 Bobby Jenks; 43 Dámaso Marte; 41 Brandon McCarthy; 18 Cliff Politte; 65 David Sanders; 10 Shingo Takatsu; 51 Luis Vizcaíno; 58 Kevin Walker | Catchers: 31 Raul Casanova; 12 A. J. Pierzynski; 36 Chris Widger; Infielders: 27 Geoff Blum; 27 Jamie Burke; 24 Joe Crede; 17 Ross Gload; 1 Willie Harris; 15 Tadahito Iguchi; 14 Paul Konerko; 62 Pedro López; 38 Pablo Ozuna; 5 Juan Uribe | Outfielders: 44 Brian Anderson; 25 Joe Borchard; 23 Jermaine Dye; 8 Carl Everett; 7 Timo Pérez; 22 Scott Podsednik; 33 Aaron Rowand; Other batters: 35 Frank Thomas | Manager: 13 Ozzie Guillén; Coaches: 3 Harold Baines (bench); 21 Don Cooper (pitching); 28 Joey Cora (third base); 53 Art Kusnyer (bullpen); 59 Man Soo Lee (bullpen catcher); 30 Tim Raines (first base); 29 Greg Walker (hitting) |

== Game log ==
=== Regular season ===
Legend
| | White Sox win |
| | White Sox loss |
| | Postponement |
| | Clinched division |
| **Bold** | White Sox team member |

2005 regular season game log: 99–63 (Home: 47–34; Away: 52–29)
April: 17–7 (Home: 7–3; Away: 10–4)

| # | Date | Time (CT) | Opponent | Score | Win | Loss | Save | Time of Game | Attendance | Record | Streak |
|---|---|---|---|---|---|---|---|---|---|---|---|
| 1 | April 4 | | Indians | 1–0 | **Buehrle** (1–0) | Westbrook (0–1) | **Takatsu** (1) | 1:51 | 38,141 | 1–0 | box |
| 2 | April 6 | | Indians | 4–3 | **Marte** (1–0) | Wickman (0–1) | | 2:55 | 10,520 | 2–0 | box |
| 3 | April 7 | | Indians | 5 – 11 (11) | Rhodes (1–0) | **Vizcaíno** (0–1) | | 3:56 | 10,800 | 2–1 | box |
| 4 | April 8 | | @ Twins | 5–1 | **Hernández** (1–0) | Lohse (0–1) | | 2:46 | 48,764 | 3–1 | box |
| 5 | April 9 | | @ Twins | 8–5 | **Garland** (1–0) | Radke (0–2) | **Takatsu** (2) | 2:37 | 41,533 | 4–1 | box |
| 6 | April 10 | | @ Twins | 2–5 | Santana (2–0) | **Buehrle** (1–1) | Nathan (2) | 2:29 | 28,089 | 4–2 | box |
| 7 | April 11 | | @ Indians | 2–1 | **García** (1–0) | Millwood (0–1) | **Takatsu** (3) | 2:39 | 42,461 | 5–2 | box |
| 8 | April 13 | | @ Indians | 5–4 (10) | **Vizcaíno** (1–1) | Howry (0–1) | **Hermanson** (1) | 2:54 | 14,410 | 6–2 | box |
| 9 | April 14 | | @ Indians | 6–8 | Betancourt (1–0) | **Hernández** (1–1) | Wickman (3) | 3:25 | 12,470 | 6–3 | box |
| 10 | April 15 | | Mariners | 6–4 | **Garland** (2–0) | Piñeiro (0–1) | **Hermanson** (2) | 2:39 | 16,749 | 7–3 | box |
| 11 | April 16 | | Mariners | 2–1 | **Buehrle** (2–1) | Franklin (1–1) | | 1:39 | 25,931 | 8–3 | box |
| 12 | April 17 | | Mariners | 4–5 | Meche (1–0) | **García** (1–1) | Guardado (3) | 2:52 | 23,324 | 8–4 | box |
| 13 | April 18 | | Twins | 5–4 | **Vizcaíno** (2–1) | Lohse (1–2) | **Takatsu** (4) | 2:47 | 27,018 | 9–4 | box |
| 14 | April 19 | | Twins | 3–1 | **Hernández** (2–1) | Radke (1–3) | **Marte** (1) | 2:40 | 18,310 | 10–4 | box |
| 15 | April 20 | | @ Tigers | 9–1 | **Garland** (3–0) | Ledezma (1–1) | | 2:19 | 16,887 | 11–4 | box |
| 16 | April 21 | | @ Tigers | 4–3 | **Buehrle** (3–1) | Bonderman (2–2) | **Takatsu** (5) | 2:21 | 19,334 | 12–4 | box |
| 17 | April 22 | | @ Royals | 8–2 | **García** (2–1) | Hernández (1–3) | | 2:36 | 15,832 | 13–4 | box |
| 18 | April 23 | | @ Royals | 3–2 (10) | **Marte** (2–0) | MacDougal (1–1) | | 3:24 | 19,641 | 14–4 | box |
| 19 | April 24 | | @ Royals | 4–3 | **Cotts** (1–0) | Camp (0–2) | **Takatsu** (6) | 2:57 | 15,331 | 15–4 | box |
| 20 | April 25 | | @ Athletics | 6–0 | **Garland** (4–0) | Zito (0–4) | | 2:20 | 10,206 | 16–4 | box |
| 21 | April 26 | | @ Athletics | 7–9 | Duchscherer (1–0) | **Marte** (2–1) | Dotel (5) | 3:06 | 20,412 | 16–5 | box |
| 22 | April 27 | | @ Athletics | 1–2 | Duchscherer (2–0) | **Marte** (2–2) | | 2:42 | 14,172 | 16–6 | box |
| 23 | April 29 | | Tigers | 2–3 (11) | Walker (1–0) | **Takatsu** (0–1) | Germán (1) | 4:10 | 18,313 | 16–7 | box |
| 24 | April 30 | | Tigers | 4–3 | **Hernández** (3–1) | Johnson (2–2) | **Hermanson** (3) | 2:50 | 30,189 | 17–7 | box |

May: 18–10 (Home: 10–3; Away: 8–7)

| # | Date | Time (CT) | Opponent | Score | Win | Loss | Save | Time of Game | Attendance | Record | Streak |
|---|---|---|---|---|---|---|---|---|---|---|---|
| 25 | May 1 | | Tigers | 8–0 | **Garland** (5–0) | Ledezma (1–2) | | 2:23 | 20,862 | 18–7 | box |
| 26 | May 3 | | Royals | 5–4 | **Buehrle** (4–1) | Sisco (0–1) | **Takatsu** (7) | 2:13 | 12,362 | 19–7 | box |
| 27 | May 4 | | Royals | 4–2 | **García** (3–1) | Hernández (1–4) | **Hermanson** (4) | 2:39 | 12,712 | 20–7 | box |
| 28 | May 5 | | Royals | 2–1 | **Contreras** (1–0) | Greinke (0–3) | **Takatsu** (8) | 2:10 | 15,389 | 21–7 | box |
| 29 | May 6 | | @ Blue Jays | 5–3 | **Hernández** (4–1) | Frasor (1–2) | **Hermanson** (5) | 3:03 | 21,769 | 22–7 | box |
| 30 | May 7 | | @ Blue Jays | 10–7 | **Garland** (6–0) | Lilly (1–3) | | 2:51 | 23,078 | 23–7 | box |
| 31 | May 8 | | @ Blue Jays | 5–4 | **Buehrle** (5–1) | Chacin (4–2) | **Marte** (2) | 2:38 | 20,946 | 24–7 | box |
| 32 | May 9 | | @ Devil Rays | 2–4 | Carter (1–0) | **García** (3–2) | Báez (3) | 2:45 | 8,774 | 24–8 | box |
| 33 | May 10 | | @ Devil Rays | 6–7 | Colomé (1–0) | **Takatsu** (0–2) | | 3:17 | 9,389 | 24–9 | box |
| 34 | May 11 | | @ Devil Rays | 5–2 | **Hernández** (5–1) | Brazelton (1–7) | **Hermanson** (6) | 2:51 | 9,414 | 25–9 | box |
| 35 | May 12 | | Orioles | 3–2 | **Garland** (7–0) | Chen (4–2) | **Hermanson** (7) | 2:21 | 29,031 | 26–9 | box |
| 36 | May 13 | | Orioles | 5–3 | **Buehrle** (6–1) | Williams (3–3) | **Hermanson** (8) | 2:29 | 28,188 | 27–9 | box |
| 37 | May 14 | | Orioles | 6–9 | Cabrera (3–2) | **García** (3–3) | Ryan (10) | 3:14 | 37,311 | 27–10 | box |
| 38 | May 15 | | Orioles | 2–6 | Bédard (4–1) | **Contreras** (1–1) | | 3:00 | 34,030 | 27–11 | box |
| 39 | May 16 | | Rangers | 6–7 | Regilio (1–1) | **Marte** (2–3) | Cordero (13) | 3:01 | 26,889 | 27–12 | box |
| 40 | May 17 | | Rangers | 5–2 | **Garland** (8–0) | Astacio (1–5) | **Hermanson** (9) | 2:22 | 18,333 | 28–12 | box |
| 41 | May 18 | | Rangers | 7–0 | **Buehrle** (7–1) | Drese (3–4) | | 2:24 | 16,255 | 29–12 | box |
| 42 | May 20 | | @ Cubs | 5–1 (10) | **García** (4–3) | Maddux (2–2) | | 2:28 | 38,988 | 30–12 | box |
| 43 | May 21 | | @ Cubs | 5–3 | **Contreras** (2–1) | Wuertz (2–2) | **Hermanson** (10) | 3:09 | 39,461 | 31–12 | box |
| 44 | May 22 | | @ Cubs | 3–4 | Prior (4–1) | **Vizcaíno** (2–2) | | 2:16 | 39,334 | 31–13 | box |
| 45 | May 23 | 9:07 p.m. CDT | @ Angels | L 0–4 | Santana (1–1) | **Garland** (8–1) | | 2:18 | 40,991 | 31–14 | L2 |
| 46 | May 24 | 9:07 p.m. CDT | @ Angels | **W** 2–1 (11) | **Marte** (3–3) | Yan (0–1) | | 2:50 | 35,182 | 32–14 | W1 |
| 47 | May 25 | 9:07 p.m. CDT | @ Angels | **W** 4–2 | **García** (5–3) | Washburn (3–3) | **Hermanson** (11) | 2:30 | 42,716 | 33–14 | W2 |
| 48 | May 26 | 9:07 p.m. CDT | @ Angels | L 2–3 | Lackey (5–2) | **Contreras** (2–2) | Shields (6) | 2:29 | 39,128 | 33–15 | L1 |
| 49 | May 27 | | @ Rangers | 2–6 | Young (5–2) | **McCarthy** (0–1) | Cordero (16) | 2:30 | 31,149 | 33–16 | box |
| – | May 28 | | @ Rangers | Postponed (rain) Rescheduled for August 30 | | | | | | | |
| 50 | May 29 | | @ Rangers | 4–12 | Park (5–1) | **Garland** (8–2) | | 2:53 | 36,265 | 33–17 | box |
| 51 | May 30 | 3:07 p.m. CDT | Angels | **W** 5–4 | **Politte** (1–0) | Shields (4–2) | | 2:49 | 38,685 | 34–17 | W1 |
| 52 | May 31 | 7:06 p.m. CDT | Angels | **W** 5–4 | **Politte** (2–0) | Donnelly (2–1) | | 2:40 | 19,864 | 35–17 | W2 |

June: 18–7 (Home: 10–6; Away: 8–1)

| # | Date | Time (CT) | Opponent | Score | Win | Loss | Save | Time of Game | Attendance | Record | Streak |
|---|---|---|---|---|---|---|---|---|---|---|---|
| 53 | June 1 | 6:07 p.m. CDT | Angels | L 7–10 | Byrd (5–4) | **Walker** (1–0) | | 3:15 | 19,393 | 35–18 | L1 |
| 54 | June 3 | | Indians | 6–4 | **Hernández** (6–1) | Westbrook (2–8) | **Hermanson** (12) | 2:27 | 23,132 | 36–18 | box |
| 55 | June 4 | | Indians | 6–5 | **Garland** (9–2) | Davis (2–2) | **Hermanson** (13) | 2:53 | 26,365 | 37–18 | box |
| 56 | June 5 | | Indians | 4–6 (12) | Riske (2–2) | **Hermanson** (0–1) | | 4:11 | 26,146 | 37–19 | box |
| 57 | June 6 | | @ Rockies | 9–3 | **García** (6–3) | Kennedy (3–6) | | 2:31 | 25,030 | 38–19 | box |
| 58 | June 7 | | @ Rockies | 2–1 | **Contreras** (3–2) | Kim (0–5) | **Hermanson** (14) | 2:37 | 21,576 | 39–19 | box |
| 59 | June 8 | | @ Rockies | 15–5 | **Hernández** (7–1) | Francis (5–3) | | 3:26 | 23,268 | 40–19 | box |
| 60 | June 10 | | @ Padres | 4–2 | **Garland** (10–2) | Williams (2–4) | **Hermanson** (15) | 2:19 | 38,126 | 41–19 | box |
| 61 | June 11 | | @ Padres | 1–2 | Linebrink (3–1) | **Hermanson** (0–2) | | 2:23 | 41,020 | 41–20 | box |
| 62 | June 12 | | @ Padres | 8–5 (10) | **Politte** (3–0) | Hoffman (0–3) | | 3:22 | 38,306 | 42–20 | box |
| 63 | June 13 | | D-backs | 1–8 | Estes (5–4) | **Contreras** (3–3) | | 2:33 | 32,952 | 42–21 | box |
| 64 | June 14 | | D-backs | 4–10 | Vázquez (7–4) | **Hernández** (7–2) | | 2:49 | 24,831 | 42–22 | box |
| 65 | June 15 | | D-backs | 12–6 | **Garland** (11–2) | Ortiz (4–6) | | 2:43 | 24,499 | 43–22 | box |
| 66 | June 17 | | Dodgers | 6–0 | **Buehrle** (8–1) | Houlton (2–1) | | 2:24 | 28,870 | 44–22 | box |
| 67 | June 18 | | Dodgers | 5–3 | **Politte** (4–0) | Brazobán (2–2) | | 2:34 | 36,067 | 45–22 | box |
| 68 | June 19 | | Dodgers | 4–3 | **Politte** (5–0) | Sanchez (1–3) | **Hermanson** (16) | 2:48 | 27,350 | 46–22 | box |
| 69 | June 20 | | Royals | 11–8 | **Cotts** (2–0) | Jensen (3–2) | **Hermanson** (17) | 3:16 | 34,345 | 47–22 | box |
| 70 | June 21 | | Royals | 5–1 | **Garland** (12–2) | Greinke (1–8) | | 2:23 | 28,206 | 48–22 | box |
| 71 | June 22 | | Royals | 5–1 | **Buehrle** (9–1) | Howell (1–2) | | 2:04 | 24,544 | 49–22 | box |
| 72 | June 24 | | Cubs | 12–2 | **García** (7–3) | Mitre (2–3) | | 2:42 | 39,610 | 50–22 | box |
| 73 | June 25 | | Cubs | 2–6 | Maddux (7–4) | **Contreras** (3–4) | | 2:51 | 39,241 | 50–23 | box |
| 74 | June 26 | | Cubs | 0–2 | Prior (5–1) | **Garland** (12–3) | Dempster (11) | 2:14 | 39,143 | 50–24 | box |
| 75 | June 28 | | @ Tigers | 2–1 | **Buehrle** (10–1) | Robertson (3–6) | **Hermanson** (18) | 2:29 | 23,602 | 51–24 | box |
| 76 | June 29 | | @ Tigers | 4–3 (13) | **Takatsu** (1–2) | Rodney (1–1) | | 3:59 | 19,931 | 52–24 | box |
| 77 | June 30 | | @ Tigers | 6–1 | **García** (8–3) | Maroth (5–9) | | 2:52 | 23,447 | 53–24 | box |

July: 15–11 (Home: 6–7; Away: 9–4)

| # | Date | Time (CT) | Opponent | Score | Win | Loss | Save | Time of Game | Attendance | Record | Streak |
|---|---|---|---|---|---|---|---|---|---|---|---|
| 78 | July 1 | | @ Athletics | 2–6 | Harden (5–3) | **Contreras** (3–5) | | 3:08 | 15,293 | 53–25 | box |
| 79 | July 2 | | @ Athletics | 5–3 | **Garland** (13–3) | Saarloos (4–5) | **Hermanson** (19) | 2:13 | 45,712 | 54–25 | box |
| 80 | July 3 | | @ Athletics | 2–7 | Zito (5–8) | **Buehrle** (10–2) | | 2:20 | 22,596 | 54–26 | box |
| 81 | July 4 | | Devil Rays | 10–8 | **Vizcaíno** (3–2) | Nomo (5–7) | **Hermanson** (20) | 3:11 | 37,351 | 55–26 | box |
| 82 | July 5 | | Devil Rays | 6–4 | **Politte** (6–0) | Carter (1–2) | **Hermanson** (21) | 2:29 | 21,555 | 56–26 | box |
| 83 | July 6 | | Devil Rays | 7–2 | **Contreras** (4–5) | Fossum (3–7) | | 2:37 | 24,773 | 57–26 | box |
| 84 | July 8 | | Athletics | 2–4 | Saarloos (5–5) | **Garland** (13–4) | Street (5) | 2:55 | 33,623 | 57–27 | box |
| 85 | July 9 | | Athletics | 1–10 | Zito (6–8) | **Buehrle** (10–3) | | 2:39 | 38,318 | 57–28 | box |
| 86 | July 10 | | Athletics | 8–9 (11) | Street (3–1) | **Vizcaíno** (3–3) | | 3:47 | 33,221 | 57–29 | box |
| — | July 12 | 7:00 p.m. CDT | **76th All-Star Game in Detroit, MI** | | | | | | | | |
| 87 | July 14 | | @ Indians | 1–0 | **Contreras** (5–5) | Millwood (3–8) | **Hermanson** (22) | 2:56 | 21,472 | 58–29 | box |
| 88 | July 15 | | @ Indians | 7–1 | **García** (9–3) | Sabathia (6–6) | | 3:01 | 29,684 | 59–29 | box |
| 89 | July 16 | | @ Indians | 7–5 | **Buehrle** (11–3) | Westbrook (6–12) | **Marte** (3) | 2:46 | 27,114 | 60–29 | box |
| 90 | July 17 | | @ Indians | 4–0 | **Garland** (14–4) | Elarton (6–4) | | 2:42 | 24,548 | 61–29 | box |
| 91 | July 18 | | Tigers | 7–5 | **Vizcaíno** (4–3) | Spurling (2–1) | **Politte** (1) | 2:52 | 37,556 | 62–29 | box |
| 92 | July 19 | | Tigers | 1–7 | Bonderman (12–6) | **Contreras** (5–6) | | 2:35 | 31,008 | 62–30 | box |
| 93 | July 20 | | Tigers | 6–8 | Robertson (5–7) | **García** (9–4) | Dingman (1) | 3:20 | 39,146 | 62–31 | box |
| 94 | July 21 | | Red Sox | 5–6 | Schilling (2–3) | **Vizcaíno** (4–4) | | 3:17 | 36,784 | 62–32 | box |
| 95 | July 22 | | Red Sox | 8–4 | **Garland** (15–4) | Wakefield (8–9) | | 2:49 | 37,511 | 63–32 | box |
| 96 | July 23 | | Red Sox | 0–3 | Miller (3–4) | **Hernández** (7–3) | Schilling (2) | 2:39 | 39,408 | 63–33 | box |
| 97 | July 24 | | Red Sox | 6–4 | **Contreras** (6–6) | Arroyo (8–6) | **Hermanson** (23) | 3:16 | 37,168 | 64–33 | box |
| 98 | July 25 | | @ Royals | 14–6 | **García** (10–4) | Greinke (3–12) | | 3:28 | 15,515 | 65–33 | box |
| 99 | July 26 | | @ Royals | 1–7 | Lima (4–8) | **Buehrle** (11–4) | | 2:24 | 19,175 | 65–34 | box |
| 100 | July 27 | | @ Royals | 5–6 (13) | Camp (1–2) | **Vizcaíno** (4–5) | | 4:25 | 17,378 | 65–35 | box |
| 101 | July 29 | | @ Orioles | 7–2 | **Hernández** (8–3) | Bédard (5–3) | | 3:25 | 45,267 | 66–35 | box |
| 102 | July 30 | | @ Orioles | 9–6 | **Cotts** (3–0) | Ray (0–3) | **Hermanson** (24) | 3:15 | 40,100 | 67–35 | box |
| 103 | July 31 | | @ Orioles | 9–4 | **García** (11–4) | López (9–6) | | 3:27 | 31,982 | 68–35 | box |

August: 12–16 (Home: 4–8; Away: 8–8)

| # | Date | Time (CT) | Opponent | Score | Win | Loss | Save | Time of Game | Attendance | Record | Streak |
|---|---|---|---|---|---|---|---|---|---|---|---|
| 104 | August 1 | | @ Orioles | 6–3 | **Buehrle** (12–4) | Cabrera (8–9) | **Hermanson** (25) | 3:09 | 47,823 | 69–35 | box |
| 105 | August 2 | | Blue Jays | 3–7 | Towers (8–8) | **Garland** (15–5) | | 2:28 | 32,162 | 69–36 | box |
| 106 | August 3 | | Blue Jays | 3–4 | Bush (2–5) | **Hernández** (8–4) | Batista (18) | 2:52 | 28,116 | 69–37 | box |
| 107 | August 4 | | Blue Jays | 5–4 | **Vizcaíno** (5–5) | Speier (1–2) | **Hermanson** (26) | 3:13 | 32,027 | 70–37 | box |
| 108 | August 5 | | Mariners | 2–4 | Piñeiro (4–7) | **García** (11–5) | Guardado (26) | 2:37 | 39,165 | 70–38 | box |
| 109 | August 6 | | Mariners | 4–2 | **Buehrle** (13–4) | Moyer (9–4) | **Hermanson** (27) | 2:19 | 37,529 | 71–38 | box |
| 110 | August 7 | | Mariners | 3–1 | **Garland** (16–5) | Harris (0–1) | **Hermanson** (28) | 2:29 | 35,706 | 72–38 | box |
| 111 | August 8 | | @ Yankees | 2–3 | Mussina (11–7) | **Hernández** (8–5) | Rivera (30) | 2:58 | 54,871 | 72–39 | box |
| 112 | August 9 | | @ Yankees | 2–1 | **Contreras** (7–6) | Chacón (0–1) | **Hermanson** (29) | 3:20 | 53,946 | 73–39 | box |
| 113 | August 10 | | @ Yankees | 2–1 (10) | **Cotts** (4–0) | Rivera (5–3) | **Hermanson** (30) | 2:58 | 54,635 | 74–39 | box |
| 114 | August 12 | | @ Red Sox | 8–9 | Bradford (1–0) | **Buehrle** (13–5) | | 2:57 | 35,132 | 74–40 | box |
| 115 | August 13 | | @ Red Sox | 4–7 | Wakefield (12–9) | **Garland** (16–6) | | 2:49 | 35,055 | 74–41 | box |
| – | August 14 | | @ Red Sox | Postponed (rain) Rescheduled for September 5 | | | | | | | |
| 116 | August 15 | | Twins | 2–4 | Lohse (8–11) | **Contreras** (7–7) | Nathan (30) | 2:51 | 39,160 | 74–42 | box |
| 117 | August 16 | | Twins | 4–9 (17) | Romero (3–3) | **Adkins** (0–1) | | 5:09 | 34,533 | 74–43 | box |
| 118 | August 17 | | Twins | 1–5 | Santana (12–6) | **Buehrle** (13–6) | | 2:34 | 33,158 | 74–44 | box |
| 119 | August 19 | | Yankees | 1–3 | Mussina (12–7) | **Garland** (16–7) | Rivera (33) | 2:55 | 39,496 | 74–45 | box |
| 120 | August 20 | | Yankees | 0–5 | Chacón (2–1) | **Hernández** (8–6) | | 3:07 | 38,938 | 74–46 | box |
| 121 | August 21 | | Yankees | 6–2 | **Contreras** (8–7) | Johnson (11–8) | | 2:18 | 39,480 | 75–46 | box |
| 122 | August 23 | | @ Twins | 0–1 | Santana (13–6) | **García** (11–6) | Nathan (32) | 2:08 | 33,572 | 75–47 | box |
| 123 | August 24 | | @ Twins | 6–4 | **Buehrle** (14–6) | Mays (6–9) | **Hermanson** (31) | 2:33 | 32,687 | 76–47 | box |
| 124 | August 25 | | @ Twins | 2–1 (10) | **Hermanson** (1–2) | Crain (9–3) | **Jenks** (1) | 2:45 | 26,895 | 77–47 | box |
| 125 | August 26 | | @ Mariners | 5–3 (12) | **Vizcaíno** (6–5) | Nelson (1–3) | **Hermanson** (32) | 3:36 | 40,431 | 78–47 | box |
| 126 | August 27 | | @ Mariners | 4–3 | **Contreras** (9–7) | Piñeiro (5–9) | **Marte** (4) | 2:53 | 37,326 | 79–47 | box |
| 127 | August 28 | | @ Mariners | 2–9 | Moyer (11–5) | **García** (11–7) | | 2:39 | 36,868 | 79–48 | box |
| 128 | August 29 | | @ Rangers | 5–7 | Dominguez (2–3) | **Buehrle** (14–7) | Brocail (1) | 2:24 | 27,819 | 79–49 | box |
| 129 | August 30 | | @ Rangers | 6–8 | Wilson (1–6) | **Garland** (16–8) | Cordero (29) | 2:39 | N/A | 79–50 | box |
| 130 | August 30 | | @ Rangers | 8–0 | **McCarthy** (1–1) | Vólquez (0–1) | | 2:43 | 28,183 | 80–50 | box |
| 131 | August 31 | | @ Rangers | 2–9 | Loe (7–4) | **Hernández** (8–7) | | 2:42 | 23,493 | 80–51 | box |

September: 17–12 (Home: 10–7; Away: 7–5)

| # | Date | Time (CT) | Opponent | Score | Win | Loss | Save | Time of Game | Attendance | Record | Streak |
|---|---|---|---|---|---|---|---|---|---|---|---|
| 132 | September 1 | | Tigers | 12–3 | **Contreras** (10–7) | Johnson (7–11) | | 2:32 | 20,743 | 81–51 | box |
| 133 | September 2 | | Tigers | 9–1 | **García** (12–7) | Douglass (5–3) | | 2:30 | 25,502 | 82–51 | box |
| 134 | September 3 | | Tigers | 6–2 | **Buehrle** (15–7) | Robertson (6–12) | | 2:21 | 30,509 | 83–51 | box |
| 135 | September 4 | | Tigers | 2–0 | **Garland** (17–8) | Bonderman (14–12) | | 2:07 | 30,931 | 84–51 | box |
| 136 | September 5 | | @ Red Sox | 5–3 | **McCarthy** (2–1) | Schilling (5–7) | | 3:11 | 35,673 | 85–51 | box |
| 137 | September 6 | | Royals | 6–5 | **Hernández** (9–7) | Lima (5–14) | **Hermanson** (33) | 2:45 | 14,571 | 86–51 | box |
| 138 | September 7 | | Royals | 1–0 | **Contreras** (11–7) | Wood (4–6) | **Hermanson** (34) | 2:37 | 18,513 | 87–51 | box |
| 139 | September 8 | | Royals | 2–4 | Howell (2–5) | **García** (12–8) | MacDougal (18) | 2:50 | 17,701 | 87–52 | box |
| 140 | September 9 | 7:06 p.m. CDT | Angels | L 5–6 (12) | Donnelly (9–3) | **Hermanson** (1–3) | | 3:45 | 28,059 | 87–53 | L2 |
| 141 | September 10 | 12:25 p.m. CDT | Angels | L 5–10 | Colón (19–6) | **Garland** (17–9) | | 3:03 | 26,538 | 87–54 | L3 |
| 142 | September 11 | 2:08 p.m. CDT | Angels | L 1–6 | Lackey (12–5) | **Hernández** (9–8) | | 2:36 | 29,321 | 87–55 | L4 |
| 143 | September 13 | | @ Royals | 6–4 | **Contreras** (12–7) | Wood (4–7) | **Jenks** (2) | 3:01 | 9,535 | 88–55 | box |
| 144 | September 14 | | @ Royals | 9–10 | Demaria (1–0) | **Hermanson** (1–4) | | 3:03 | 9,922 | 88–56 | box |
| 145 | September 15 | | @ Royals | 5–7 | Burgos (2–5) | **Buehrle** (15–8) | MacDougal (19) | 2:58 | 9,258 | 88–57 | box |
| 146 | September 16 | | @ Twins | 2–1 (10) | **Jenks** (1–0) | Crain (10–5) | | 2:49 | 26,951 | 89–57 | box |
| 147 | September 17 | | @ Twins | 0–5 | Santana (14–7) | **Hernández** (9–9) | | 2:50 | 24,866 | 89–58 | box |
| 148 | September 18 | | @ Twins | 2–1 | **Contreras** (13–7) | Rincón (6–6) | **Jenks** (3) | 2:17 | 23,559 | 90–58 | box |
| 149 | September 19 | | Indians | 5–7 | Betancourt (4–3) | **Marte** (3–4) | Wickman (44) | 3:31 | 35,748 | 90–59 | box |
| 150 | September 20 | | Indians | 7–6 (10) | **Hermanson** (2–4) | Riske (3–4) | | 3:31 | 26,147 | 91–59 | box |
| 151 | September 21 | | Indians | 0–8 | Elarton (11–7) | **Garland** (17–10) | | 2:47 | 36,543 | 91–60 | box |
| 152 | September 22 | | Twins | 1–4 (11) | Crain (11–5) | **Jenks** (1–1) | Nathan (39) | 3:12 | 25,112 | 91–61 | box |
| 153 | September 23 | | Twins | 3–1 | **Contreras** (14–7) | Lohse (9–13) | | 2:19 | 28,003 | 92–61 | box |
| 154 | September 24 | | Twins | 8–1 | **García** (13–8) | Mays (6–10) | | 2:27 | 37,699 | 93–61 | box |
| 155 | September 25 | | Twins | 4–1 | **Buehrle** (16–8) | Liriano (0–2) | | 1:53 | 30,402 | 94–61 | box |
| 156 | September 26 | | @ Tigers | 3–4 | Rodney (2–3) | **Politte** (6–1) | | 2:43 | 10,840 | 94–62 | box |
| 157 | September 27 | | @ Tigers | 2–3 | Robertson (7–15) | **McCarthy** (2–2) | Rodney (9) | 2:21 | 13,983 | 94–63 | box |
| 158 | September 28 | | @ Tigers | 8–2 | **Contreras** (15–7) | Douglass (5–5) | | 2:46 | 17,221 | 95–63 | box |
| 159 | September 29 | | @ Tigers | 4–2 | **García** (14–8) | Grilli (1–1) | **Jenks** (4) | 2:22 | 13,494 | 96–63 | box |
| 160 | September 30 | | @ Indians | 3–2 (13) | **Politte** (7–1) | Cabrera (2–1) | **Jenks** (5) | 4:17 | 41,072 | 97–63 | box |

October: 2–0 (Home: 0–0; Away: 2–0)

| # | Date | Time (CT) | Opponent | Score | Win | Loss | Save | Time of Game | Attendance | Record | Streak |
|---|---|---|---|---|---|---|---|---|---|---|---|
| 161 | October 1 | | @ Indians | 4–3 | **Garland** (18–10) | Westbrook (15–15) | **Jenks** (6) | 2:48 | 41,026 | 98–63 | box |
| 162 | October 2 | | @ Indians | 3–1 | **McCarthy** (3–2) | Elarton (11–9) | **Hernández** (1) | 2:56 | 41,034 | 99–63 | box |

=== Detailed records ===
American League
| Opponent | W | L | WP | RS | RA |
AL East
| Baltimore Orioles | 6 | 2 | 0.750 | 47 | 35 |
| Boston Red Sox | 3 | 4 | 0.429 | 36 | 36 |
| New York Yankees | 3 | 3 | 0.500 | 11 | 15 |
| Tampa Bay Devil Rays | 4 | 2 | 0.667 | 36 | 27 |
| Toronto Blue Jays | 4 | 2 | 0.667 | 31 | 29 |
| Div Total | 20 | 13 | 0.606 | 161 | 142 |
AL Central
| **Chicago White Sox** | | | | | |
| Cleveland Indians | 14 | 5 | 0.737 | 80 | 75 |
| Detroit Tigers | 14 | 5 | 0.737 | 99 | 52 |
| Kansas City Royals | 13 | 5 | 0.722 | 96 | 73 |
| Minnesota Twins | 11 | 7 | 0.611 | 58 | 54 |
| Div Total | 52 | 22 | 0.703 | 333 | 254 |
AL West
| Los Angeles Angels of Anaheim | 4 | 6 | 0.400 | 36 | 50 |
| Oakland Athletics | 2 | 7 | 0.222 | 34 | 50 |
| Seattle Mariners | 6 | 3 | 0.667 | 32 | 32 |
| Texas Rangers | 3 | 6 | 0.333 | 45 | 51 |
| Div Total | 15 | 22 | 0.405 | 147 | 183 |
| League Total | 87 | 57 | 0.604 | 641 | 489 |
National League
| Arizona Diamondbacks | 1 | 2 | 0.333 | 17 | 24 |
| Chicago Cubs | 3 | 3 | 0.500 | 27 | 18 |
| Colorado Rockies | 3 | 0 | 1.000 | 26 | 9 |
| Los Angeles Dodgers | 3 | 0 | 1.000 | 15 | 6 |
| San Diego Padres | 2 | 1 | 0.667 | 13 | 9 |
| League Total | 12 | 6 | 0.667 | 98 | 66 |
| Season Total | 99 | 63 | 0.611 | 749 | 555 |

| Month | Games | Won | Lost | Win % | RS | RA |
|---|---|---|---|---|---|---|
| April | 24 | 17 | 7 | .708 | 106 | 81 |
| May | 28 | 18 | 10 | .643 | 123 | 107 |
| June | 25 | 18 | 7 | .720 | 141 | 98 |
| July | 26 | 15 | 11 | .577 | 140 | 127 |
| August | 28 | 12 | 16 | .429 | 96 | 119 |
| September | 29 | 17 | 12 | .586 | 126 | 109 |
| October | 2 | 2 | 0 | 1.000 | 7 | 4 |
| Total | 162 | 99 | 63 | 0.611 | 741 | 645 |

| | Games | Won | Lost | Win % | RS | RA |
Home
Away
| Total | 162 | 99 | 63 | 0.611 | 749 | 555 |

2005 Postseason game log: 11–1 (Home: 5–1; Away: 6–0)
AL Division Series vs. Boston Red Sox 3–0 (Home: 2–0; Away: 1–0)

| # | Date | Time (CT) | Opponent | Score | Win | Loss | Save | Time of Game | Attendance | Series | Box/ Streak |
|---|---|---|---|---|---|---|---|---|---|---|---|
| 1 | October 4 | | Red Sox | 14–2 | **Contreras** (1–0) | Clement (0–1) | | 2:56 | 40,717 | CHA 1–0 | box |
| 2 | October 5 | | Red Sox | 5–4 | **Buehrle** (1–0) | Wells (0–1) | **Jenks** (1) | 2:29 | 40,799 | CHA 2–0 | box |
| 3 | October 7 | | @ Red Sox | 5–3 | **García** (1–0) | Wakefield (0–1) | **Jenks** (2) | 3:28 | 35,496 | CHA 3–0 | box |

AL Championship Series vs. Los Angeles Angels 4–1 (Home: 1–1; Away: 3–0)

| # | Date | Time (CT) | Opponent | Score | Win | Loss | Save | Time of Game | Attendance | Series | Box/ Streak |
|---|---|---|---|---|---|---|---|---|---|---|---|
| 1 | October 11 | 7:19 p.m. CDT | Angels | L 2–3 | Byrd (1–0) | **Contreras** (1–1) | Rodríguez (3) | 2:47 | 40,659 | LAA 0–1 | L1 |
| 2 | October 12 | 7:28 p.m. CDT | Angels | **W** 2–1 | **Buehrle** (2–0) | Escobar (1–1) | | 2:34 | 41,013 | Tied 1–1 | W1 |
| 3 | October 14 | 7:28 p.m. CDT | @ Angels | **W** 5–2 | **Garland** (1–0) | Lackey (0–1) | | 2:42 | 44,725 | CHA 2–1 | W2 |
| 4 | October 15 | 7:16 p.m. CDT | @ Angels | **W** 8–2 | **García** (2–0) | Santana (1–1) | | 2:46 | 44,857 | CHA 3–1 | W3 |
| 5 | October 16 | 7:29 p.m. CDT | @ Angels | **W** 6–3 | **Contreras** (2–1) | Escobar (1–2) | | 3:11 | 44,712 | CHA 4–1 | W4 |

World Series vs. Houston Astros 4–0 (Home: 2–0; Away: 2–0)

| # | Date | Time (CT) | Opponent | Score | Win | Loss | Save | Time of Game | Attendance | Series | Box/ Streak |
|---|---|---|---|---|---|---|---|---|---|---|---|
| 1 | October 22 | 7:05 p.m. CDT | Astros | **W** 5–3 | **Contreras** (1–0) | Rodríguez (0–1) | **Jenks** (1) | 3:13 | 41,206 | CHA 1–0 | W1 |
| 2 | October 23 | 7:16 p.m. CDT | Astros | **W** 7–6 | **Cotts** (1–0) | Lidge (0–1) | — | 3:11 | 41,432 | CHA 2–0 | W2 |
| 3 | October 25 | 7:39 p.m. CDT | @ Astros | **W** 7–5 (14) | **Marte** (1–0) | Astacio (0–1) | **Buehrle** (1) | 5:41 | 42,848 | CHA 3–0 | W3 |
| 4 | October 26 | 7:41 p.m. CDT | @ Astros | **W** 1–0 | **García** (1–0) | Lidge (0–2) | **Jenks** (2) | 3:20 | 42,936 | CHA 4–0 | W4 |

== Player stats ==
=== Batting ===
Note: G = Games played; AB = At bats; R = Runs scored; H = Hits; 2B = Doubles; 3B = Triples; HR = Home runs; RBI = Runs batted in; BB = Base on balls; SO = Strikeouts; AVG = Batting average; SB = Stolen bases

| Player | G | AB | R | H | 2B | 3B | HR | RBI | BB | SO | AVG | SB |
|---|---|---|---|---|---|---|---|---|---|---|---|---|
| Brian Anderson, OF | 13 | 34 | 3 | 6 | 1 | 0 | 2 | 3 | 0 | 12 | .176 | 1 |
| Geoff Blum, 1B, 3B, SS, 2B | 31 | 95 | 6 | 19 | 2 | 1 | 1 | 3 | 4 | 15 | .200 | 0 |
| Joe Borchard, OF | 7 | 12 | 0 | 5 | 2 | 0 | 0 | 0 | 0 | 4 | .417 | 0 |
| Mark Buehrle, P | 33 | 3 | 0 | 0 | 0 | 0 | 0 | 0 | 0 | 1 | .000 | 0 |
| Jamie Burke, 1B | 1 | 1 | 0 | 0 | 0 | 0 | 0 | 0 | 0 | 0 | .000 | 0 |
| Raul Casanova, C | 6 | 5 | 0 | 1 | 0 | 0 | 0 | 0 | 0 | 1 | .200 | 0 |
| José Contreras, P | 32 | 3 | 0 | 0 | 0 | 0 | 0 | 0 | 1 | 2 | .000 | 0 |
| Joe Crede, 3B | 132 | 432 | 54 | 109 | 21 | 0 | 22 | 62 | 25 | 66 | .252 | 1 |
| Jermaine Dye, RF | 145 | 529 | 74 | 145 | 29 | 2 | 31 | 86 | 39 | 99 | .274 | 11 |
| Carl Everett, DH, OF | 135 | 490 | 58 | 123 | 17 | 2 | 23 | 87 | 42 | 99 | .251 | 4 |
| Freddy García, P | 33 | 7 | 0 | 0 | 0 | 0 | 0 | 0 | 0 | 1 | .000 | 0 |
| Jon Garland, P | 32 | 2 | 0 | 1 | 0 | 0 | 0 | 1 | 0 | 1 | .500 | 0 |
| Ross Gload, OF, 1B | 28 | 42 | 2 | 7 | 2 | 0 | 0 | 5 | 2 | 9 | .167 | 0 |
| Willie Harris, 2B, SS | 56 | 121 | 17 | 31 | 2 | 1 | 1 | 8 | 13 | 25 | .256 | 10 |
| Orlando Hernández, P | 24 | 3 | 0 | 1 | 0 | 0 | 0 | 0 | 0 | 1 | .333 | 0 |
| Tadahito Iguchi, 2B | 135 | 511 | 74 | 142 | 25 | 6 | 15 | 71 | 47 | 114 | .278 | 15 |
| Paul Konerko, 1B | 158 | 575 | 98 | 163 | 24 | 0 | 40 | 100 | 81 | 109 | .283 | 0 |
| Pedro Lopez, 2B, SS | 2 | 7 | 1 | 2 | 0 | 0 | 0 | 2 | 0 | 1 | .286 | 0 |
| Brandon McCarthy, P | 12 | 2 | 0 | 0 | 0 | 0 | 0 | 0 | 0 | 2 | .000 | 0 |
| Pablo Ozuna, SS, OF, 2B | 70 | 203 | 27 | 56 | 7 | 2 | 0 | 11 | 7 | 26 | .276 | 14 |
| Timo Perez, OF | 76 | 179 | 13 | 39 | 8 | 0 | 2 | 15 | 12 | 25 | .218 | 2 |
| A. J. Pierzynski, C | 128 | 460 | 61 | 118 | 21 | 0 | 18 | 56 | 23 | 68 | .257 | 0 |
| Scott Podsednik, LF | 129 | 507 | 80 | 147 | 28 | 1 | 0 | 25 | 47 | 75 | .290 | 59 |
| Cliff Politte, P | 68 | 1 | 1 | 1 | 0 | 0 | 0 | 1 | 0 | 0 | 1.000 | 0 |
| Aaron Rowand, CF | 157 | 578 | 77 | 156 | 30 | 5 | 13 | 69 | 32 | 116 | .270 | 16 |
| Frank Thomas, DH | 34 | 105 | 19 | 23 | 3 | 0 | 12 | 26 | 16 | 31 | .219 | 0 |
| Juan Uribe, SS | 146 | 481 | 58 | 121 | 23 | 3 | 16 | 71 | 34 | 77 | .252 | 4 |
| Chris Widger, C | 45 | 141 | 18 | 34 | 8 | 0 | 4 | 11 | 10 | 22 | .241 | 0 |
| Team totals | 162 | 5529 | 741 | 1450 | 253 | 23 | 200 | 713 | 435 | 1002 | .262 | 137 |

=== Pitching ===
Note: W = Wins; L = Losses; ERA = Earned run average; G = Games pitched; GS = Games started; SV = Saves; IP = Innings pitched; H = Hits allowed; R = Runs allowed; ER = Earned runs allowed; HR = Home runs allowed; BB = Walks allowed; K = Strikeouts

| Player | W | L | ERA | G | GS | SV | IP | H | R | ER | HR | BB | K |
|---|---|---|---|---|---|---|---|---|---|---|---|---|---|
| Jon Adkins | 0 | 1 | 8.64 | 5 | 0 | 0 | 8.1 | 13 | 8 | 8 | 0 | 6 | 1 |
| Jeff Bajenaru | 0 | 0 | 6.23 | 4 | 0 | 0 | 4.1 | 4 | 3 | 3 | 2 | 0 | 3 |
| Mark Buehrle | 16 | 8 | 3.12 | 33 | 33 | 0 | 236.2 | 240 | 99 | 82 | 20 | 44 | 149 |
| José Contreras | 15 | 7 | 3.61 | 32 | 32 | 0 | 204.2 | 177 | 91 | 82 | 23 | 77 | 154 |
| Neal Cotts | 4 | 0 | 1.94 | 69 | 0 | 0 | 60.1 | 38 | 15 | 13 | 1 | 34 | 58 |
| Freddy García | 14 | 8 | 3.87 | 33 | 33 | 0 | 228.0 | 225 | 102 | 98 | 26 | 62 | 146 |
| Jon Garland | 18 | 10 | 3.50 | 32 | 32 | 0 | 221.0 | 212 | 93 | 86 | 26 | 50 | 115 |
| Dustin Hermanson | 2 | 4 | 2.04 | 57 | 0 | 34 | 57.1 | 46 | 17 | 13 | 4 | 21 | 33 |
| Orlando Hernández | 9 | 9 | 5.12 | 24 | 22 | 1 | 128.1 | 137 | 77 | 73 | 18 | 51 | 91 |
| Bobby Jenks | 1 | 1 | 2.75 | 32 | 0 | 6 | 39.1 | 34 | 15 | 12 | 3 | 18 | 50 |
| Dámaso Marte | 3 | 4 | 3.77 | 66 | 0 | 4 | 45.1 | 45 | 21 | 19 | 5 | 37 | 54 |
| Brandon McCarthy | 3 | 2 | 4.03 | 12 | 10 | 0 | 67.0 | 62 | 30 | 30 | 13 | 17 | 48 |
| Cliff Politte | 7 | 1 | 2.00 | 68 | 0 | 1 | 67.1 | 42 | 15 | 15 | 7 | 25 | 57 |
| David Sanders | 0 | 0 | 13.50 | 2 | 0 | 0 | 2.0 | 3 | 3 | 3 | 1 | 1 | 1 |
| Shingo Takatsu | 1 | 2 | 5.97 | 31 | 0 | 8 | 28.2 | 30 | 19 | 19 | 9 | 17 | 32 |
| Luis Vizcaíno | 6 | 5 | 3.73 | 65 | 0 | 0 | 70.0 | 74 | 30 | 29 | 8 | 35 | 43 |
| Kevin Walker | 0 | 1 | 9.00 | 9 | 0 | 0 | 7.0 | 10 | 7 | 7 | 1 | 6 | 5 |
| Team totals | 99 | 63 | 3.61 | 162 | 162 | 54 | 1475.2 | 1392 | 645 | 592 | 167 | 501 | 1040 |

== Postseason ==
Chicago began its eighth trip to the postseason in 2005. The last time they reached the playoffs, during the 2000 season, they were swept by the wild card Seattle Mariners in three games after having the best record in the American League that season. The White Sox' power, or lack thereof in the series, ultimately doomed them. The pitching, which had been average at best all year, collapsed against Seattle.

The time before that, after their 1993 AL West Division title, the White Sox won two games against the eventual World Series Champion Toronto Blue Jays. Expectations were pretty high for the 2005 playoffs, especially if they could erase that 88-year World Series drought.

=== American League Division Series- White Sox vs. Boston Red Sox ===
==== Game 1 ====
Manager Ozzie Guillén reminded his team not to feel happy just to be in the playoffs, and the White Sox took it to heart. The "South Siders" pounded the Red Sox 14–2 behind two home runs from A. J. Pierzynski. Paul Konerko, Juan Uribe, and Scott Podsednik added solo home runs. Podsednik's homer was his first of the season. The White Sox also got another solid performance from starter José Contreras, who went 7 2/3 innings, allowing only two runs, and striking out six. The White Sox beat up on former Cub Matt Clement, as his day was done after just 3 1/3 innings, giving up eight runs. The White Sox played a just about flawless game all together, with plays like Tadahito Iguchi's surprise throw to third to nail Trot Nixon, taking some momentum out of the Red Sox. Everything was looking up for the White Sox, but Boston was the defending champion, so they weren't counting out the Red Sox that easily. Final score: White Sox 14, Boston 2.

==== Game 2 ====
White Sox ace Mark Buehrle got his chance in this game to turn in a solid postseason performance. Buehrle was with the White Sox in 2000 for their last playoff run, and pitched 1/3 scoreless inning of relief back then. But given his first chance to start, he looked to help his team put the Red Sox in a 2-0-hole that would be awfully hard to get out of. Buehrle was a little substandard, giving up four runs and eight hits over seven innings. However, he still got the win partially thanks to Boston second baseman Tony Graffanino, a former White Sox. With one out and Joe Crede on first in the fifth inning, Juan Uribe hit a ground ball up the middle. Graffanino took his eyes off the ball and started to flip the ball to shortstop Édgar Rentería before he had actually fielded it. The ball went through his legs and into the outfield. This allowed Crede to move to third, allowing a prime scoring opportunity for the White Sox.

Scott Podsednik spoiled the first chance, fouling out to third. That sent Tadahito Iguchi up to bat with the White Sox down 4–2. Iguchi sent a curveball from pitcher David Wells into the left field seats for a 5–4 lead. The White Sox never relinquished this lead, as Bobby Jenks came on in the eighth inning to claim the two inning save. The Sox had just won their second postseason game in a row, and headed to Boston, up two games to none. However, the Red Sox had come back from three down in the American League Championship the year before on their way to winning the World Series, so no one was taking Boston lightly. Final Score: White Sox 5, Boston 4.

==== Game 3 ====
Game 3 proved to be perhaps the most exciting of the whole series. The White Sox headed into Boston, taking on Johnny Damon, Manny Ramirez, and David Ortiz, and were confident. Freddy García was starting, ready to nail down his second clinching win of the season (He had been the winning pitcher in the game where the White Sox clinched the Central Division title.). The White Sox took a 2–0 lead in the top of the third inning with some key hits. However, García did not have a very good start, which kept the Red Sox in the game. He gave up two runs in the bottom of the fourth inning to tie the game. But Paul Konerko, the White Sox' number one run producer the whole season, stepped to the plate in the top of the sixth inning with Jermaine Dye on base. He sent a pitch over the left field wall to put the White Sox ahead 4–2, and keep a lead that they never lost. A particularly tense point came in the sixth inning. García gave up a mammoth home run to Manny Ramirez to bring Boston to within one, and then Boston loaded the bases with a single and two walks. That prompted manager Ozzie Guillén to bring on Orlando "El Duque" Hernández, who was brought to Chicago for his incredible postseason track record while with the New York Yankees. With no outs, Hernández got Jason Varitek and Tony Graffanino to pop up in consecutive at-bats. Then after Johnny Damon drew a full count from Hernández, El Duque got him to miss, ending the inning and putting the Red Sox down to rest. Hernández pitched two more scoreless innings, allowing only one more hit. The White Sox added a run in the top of the ninth inning for security, leading to Bobby Jenks closing out his second game of the series and sending Chicago into the American League Championship Series. Final Score: White Sox 5, Boston 3.

This was the White Sox first postseason series win since the 1917 World Series.

=== American League Championship Series- White Sox vs. Los Angeles Angels of Anaheim ===
==== Game 1 ====
By virtue of their sweep in the Division Series, the White Sox got to enjoy a three-day break in between the two series, while the Los Angeles Angels of Anaheim and New York Yankees battled it out. Due to a rain-out, the Angels had to fly from New York to Anaheim for Game 5 of the series, and then fly to Chicago in back to back nights. It was assumed that the White Sox had an advantage in this series, because they were very well rested and Los Angeles was very tired. However, that was not the case. The Angels were led by a home run from Garret Anderson in the second, and Chicago was unable to execute in the field, leading to two more Angel runs. The White Sox got on the board with a Joe Crede home run in the third. They added on another run to cut the lead to 3–2 with A. J. Pierzynski's RBI single in the fourth. However, that was all the production the Sox could muster, as they wasted opportunities in the later innings. A solid start by José Contreras couldn't save the Sox either. Contreras went 8 1/3 innings, giving up three runs. It was Contreras's first loss since August 15, when he suffered defeat to the Minnesota Twins. The White Sox were now in a hole, and faced a crucial Game 2, or risk going to Anaheim down 2–0 in the series. Final Score: Los Angeles 3, White Sox 2.

==== Game 2 ====
Mark Buehrle was the mound in Game 2, and turned in an incredible outing. Through nine innings, he only gave up a Robb Quinlan home run in the fifth, and the White Sox scored a run in the bottom of the first via errors. With the score tied 1–1 with two outs in the bottom of the ninth and Buehrle getting ready to start the tenth inning, A. J. Pierzynski stepped to the plate. He swung on a split-finger fastball in the dirt from Kelvim Escobar for strike three. Home Plate Umpire Doug Eddings called Pierzynski out on three strikes. Pierzynski began walking toward the dugout, but then ran to first base. Pierzynski claimed the ball was not caught. After much discussion between the umpires he was awarded first base, and the inning continued. Pablo Ozuna went in to pinch run, and on the first pitch, stole second base without a throw. Joe Crede, after taking two strikes, lined the next pitch from Escobar off the left field wall for a walk-off double. The White Sox pulled out a victory and evened the series. Final Score: White Sox 2, Los Angeles 1.

==== Game 3 ====
The series now switched to Anaheim, where the White Sox had a history of playing poorly. But the White Sox disregarded tradition and won three straight. Jon Garland, who hadn't pitched in the Division Series, made his first career playoff start. Garland picked up right where Mark Buehrle had left off. Throwing a complete game of his own, Garland gave up only two runs on an Orlando Cabrera home run in the sixth inning while striking out seven. He was helped by his offense, specifically Paul Konerko, who hit a two-run home run in the top of the first inning, proving to be the game winning runs as the White Sox built a 3–0 lead after one. The lead was extended to 5–0 by the sixth before the Cabrera home run. The final score was 5–2, Chicago.

This game had no controversy, although Doug Eddings, the home plate umpire in Game 2 who ruled the third strike to A. J. Pierzynski hit the ground, did get booed while being introduced. The White Sox had put together a 2–1 series lead as well as back to back complete games in a postseason series for the first time since 1982, when it was accomplished by Tommy John and Bruce Kison for the California Angels. The Sox headed into Game 4 looking to take a three games to one lead. Final Score: White Sox 5, Los Angeles 2.

==== Game 4 ====
Inspired by his teammate's performances the last two games of the series, Freddy García followed suit, tossing yet another complete game. García was masterful over the game, giving up only six hits and two runs. He was helped by a three-run lead in the first inning. This time, Paul Konerko hit a three-run homer. This complete game marked the first time a team had thrown three straight complete games in a postseason series since the 1973 National League Championship Series when Tom Seaver, Jon Matlack, and Jerry Koosman accomplished the feat for the New York Mets, despite Seaver's being a loss.

Another incident involving catcher A. J. Pierzynski took place in the second inning. There were runners on first and third at the time, and Steve Finley was at the plate. Finley swung and clipped Pierzynski's glove during his follow through. As Finley ran to first he looked back at the umpires and yelled for catcher's interference. However, the call was not made, and Finley eventually ended up grounding into an inning ending double play. The victory put the White Sox one victory away from heading to the World Series, and one step closer to ending their long World Series Championship drought. Final Score: White Sox 8, Los Angeles 2.

==== Game 5 ====
José Contreras, who had pitched well in Game 1 but lost, was on the mound for Game 5, trying to send the White Sox to their first World Series since 1959. Contreras definitely did his part. Contreras fired a fourth complete game. He surrendered three runs on five hits over the game, but the White Sox offense scored enough runs to give him a 6–3 victory. The four consecutive complete games in a postseason was a League Championship Series record, and the first time since the New York Yankees got five complete games in a row from Whitey Ford, Tom Sturdivant, Don Larsen (which was a perfect game), Bob Turley, and Johnny Kucks during the 1956 World Series against the Brooklyn Dodgers.

The White Sox started the scoring in the second on Joe Crede's sacrifice fly. The Angels tied it in the third with an Adam Kennedy single. In the fifth, Jermaine Dye hit a two-out double that put the White Sox ahead 2–1. However, the Angels struck right back with a ground rule double from Chone Figgins and a sacrifice fly from Garret Anderson. However, it was all White Sox after that. Joe Crede hit a game-tying home run off Kelvim Escobar in the seventh. In the eighth, A. J. Pierzynski was at it again. He hit a slow rolling ground ball down the first base line and Escobar tagged him. However, replay showed Escobar tagged with his glove- while the ball was in his hand. Randy Marsh, the first base umpire, called Pierzynski out, but then the umpires talked it over after manager Ozzie Guillén ran out to argue. The call was reversed, and Pierzynski was rewarded first base with Aaron Rowand on second with two out. Joe Crede faced Angels closer Francisco Rodríguez, who set the major league record for saves in a season in 2008 with 62, and Crede laced a single up the middle to score Rowand and put the White Sox ahead for good. Paul Konerko added an RBI double in the ninth for insurance. Konerko won the ALCS MVP award as the White Sox looked to win their first World Series since 1917. Final Score: White Sox 6, Los Angeles 3.

This was the White Sox first pennant since 1959.

=== 2005 World Series- White Sox vs. Houston Astros ===
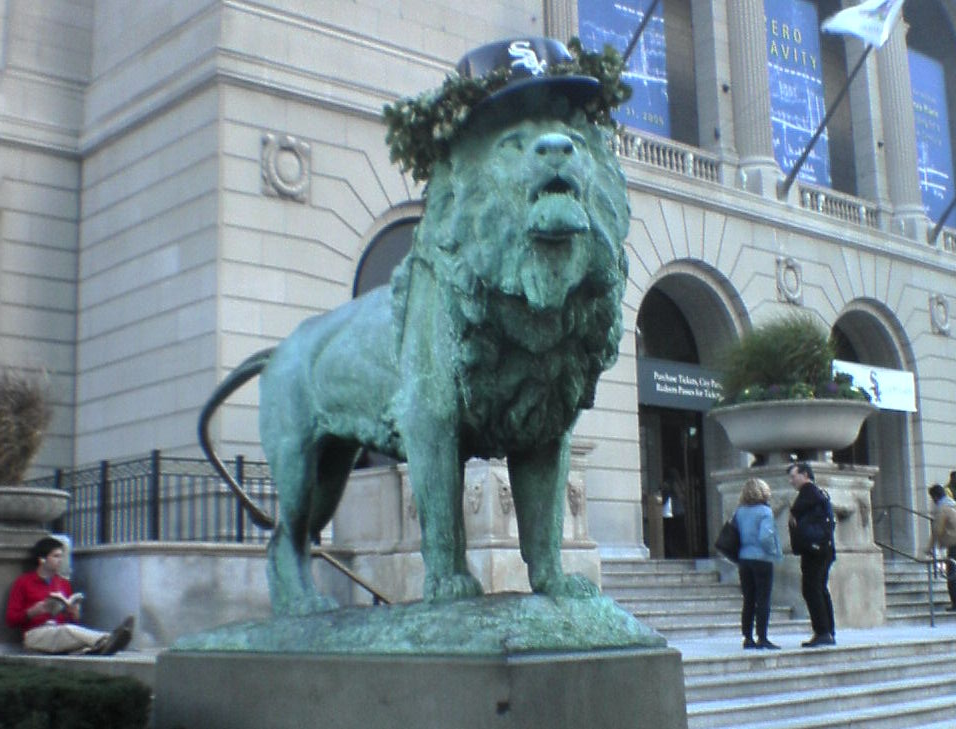
One of the two lion sculptures outside of the Art Institute of Chicago decorated to celebrate the White Sox for the World Series

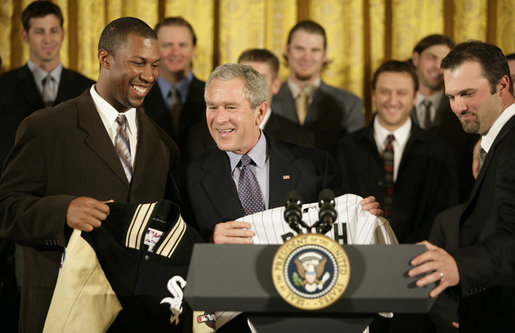
White Sox players join President George W. Bush in the East Room during their celebratory White House visit honoring their victory

==== Game 1 ====
Chicago's opponent in the 2005 World Series was the National League Champion Houston Astros, who defeated the St. Louis Cardinals in the National League Championship Series to clinch a trip to their first World Series in franchise history. The night was special for Craig Biggio and Jeff Bagwell, two longtime Astros making their first trip to the World Series. Game 1 was José Contreras vs. Roger Clemens. However, Clemens re-injured his hamstring in the second inning, and so his night was done early. In the fourth, with the score tied 3–3, Joe Crede took control of the game. He homered in the inning, and then, in the sixth, he made two diving stops to save runs and keep the White Sox ahead by one.

The story of the night, though, was the bullpen. After Contreras lasted seven plus innings, Neal Cotts relieved him. Willy Taveras had hit a leadoff double off Contreras, and then Cotts entered. He gave up a hard outfield single to Lance Berkman, which was hit at a fielder, and hit so hard that Taveras couldn't score, and stopped at third. However, Cotts then went on to strike out Morgan Ensberg and Mike Lamb, bringing up Bagwell. That prompted manager Ozzie Guillén to bring on closer Bobby Jenks. Jenks struck out Bagwell with his 100-mile per hour fastball. He then got the next three outs in the top of the ninth to give the White Sox a Game 1 victory. Final Score: White Sox 5, Houston 3.

==== Game 2 ====
Fresh off a victory the night before, the White Sox tried to make it two in a row in the Series, but this time the opposing pitcher was Andy Pettitte, an excellent pitcher who was making his 34th career postseason start. This game was sloppy, as temperatures were cold and it was raining. Mark Buehrle wasn't throwing his best pitches, as he gave up four runs in seven innings. However, with the White Sox down 4–2 in the seventh, Paul Konerko took over. With the bases loaded, he sent the first pitch he saw from reliever Chad Qualls into the left field bullpen for a 6–4 White Sox lead on a grand slam. The slam was the first one in White Sox postseason history. However, the lead only lasted for an inning. Bobby Jenks, evidently not playing his best either, gave up two runs in the top of the ninth to tie the game. Fortunately enough for Jenks, Scott Podsednik came to the rescue. Hitting second in the ninth, Podsednik sent a pitch from Brad Lidge into the right field seats for a walk-off home run, his second homer of the whole season. It was the 14th walk-off home run in World Series history, and sent the White Sox to Houston up two games to none. Final Score: White Sox 7, Astros 6.

==== Game 3 ====
This game was the longest game in World Series history time wise, and tied for the longest game in World Series history according to innings. In the first World Series game played in the state of Texas, the hometown Astros got off to a good start. They jumped out to a 4–0 lead through four innings. However, in the fifth, the White Sox scored 5 runs to take the lead 5–4 in a 46-pitch inning for Houston's Roy Oswalt. But the Astros tied the score in the bottom of the eighth, and as neither team scored in the ninth inning, the game went into extra innings.

The game kept going on and on until the top of the fourteenth inning when Geoff Blum stepped to the plate. Blum did not have a postseason at-bat for the White Sox since Game 1 of the Division Series. But he connected on a home run off Ezequiel Astacio to give the White Sox a one-run lead. They added another run later in the inning. After Dámaso Marte began the bottom half of the inning, Mark Buehrle came out and got the save for Chicago. After using nine pitchers to the Astros' eight, and playing for 5 hours and 41 minutes, the White Sox were just one win away from clinching their first World Series championship in 88 years. Final Score: White Sox 7, Houston 5.

==== Game 4 ====
Heeding the words of Ozzie Guillén to win the World Series as soon as possible, the White Sox took it to heart in a trademark 1–0 win. Freddy García was on the mound against the young but talented Brandon Backe. Locked in a pitchers' duel through seven innings, Guillén decided to take García out and replace him with a pinch hitter in the top of the eighth inning. Willie Harris pinch-hit for García and started the inning off with a single. After moving to third with two outs, Jermaine Dye drove him in with a single up the middle against Brad Lidge, who had given up Scott Posednik's game-winning home run earlier in the series. Dye won World Series MVP honors for his good hitting throughout the series. After Cliff Polite and Neal Cotts pitched a scoreless eighth, Bobby Jenks came in to close the game out. He gave up a leadoff single, and got an out via a sacrifice bunt, but then it was all Juan Uribe. Uribe chased down a foul ball and dove into the stands to make the acrobatic catch. He then made the play on a slow, bouncing hit over the head of Jenks to throw out Orlando Palmeiro to win the game and the World Series for the White Sox. Final Score: White Sox 1, Houston 0.

With their 11–1 record, the White Sox tied the 1999 New York Yankees for the best record in a single postseason in the wild card era (since 1995). In calling the final out, White Sox broadcaster John Rooney's call of "A White Sox winner and a World Championship!" echoed Jack Buck's call of the St. Louis Cardinals winning the 1982 World Series: "That's a winner! That's a winner! A World Series winner for the Cardinals!" Following the series, Rooney coincidentally joined the Cardinals broadcasting team and announced their victory in the 2006 World Series.

== Farm system ==
| Level | Team | League | Manager |
|---|---|---|---|
| AAA | Charlotte Knights | International League | Nick Leyva and Manny Trillo |
| AA | Birmingham Barons | Southern League | Razor Shines |
| A | Winston-Salem Warthogs | Carolina League | Chris Cron |
| A | Kannapolis Intimidators | South Atlantic League | Nick Capra |
| Rookie | Bristol White Sox | Appalachian League | Jerry Hairston, Sr. |
| Rookie | Great Falls White Sox | Pioneer League | John Orton |

LEAGUE CHAMPIONS: Kannapolis
