= Hermanson =

Hermanson is a surname. Notable people with the surname include:

- Albert Hermanson (1881–1960), Swedish-born Canadian farmer and politician
- Christian Hermanson, American military officer and politician
- Dustin Hermanson (born 1972), American baseball player
- Elwin Hermanson (born 1952), Canadian politician
- Marie Hermanson (born 1956), Swedish writer and journalist
- Phil Hermanson (born 1965), American politician

== See also ==
- Mount Hermanson, mountain of Antarctica
- Hermannsson
- Hermansen
- Hermansson
