= 2005 Division Series =

2005 Division Series may refer to:

- 2005 American League Division Series
- 2005 National League Division Series
