= Alexander Hermansson =

Alexander Hermansson may refer to:

- Alexander Hermansson (ice hockey)
- Alexander Hermansson (entertainer)
