= Scott Podsednik =

American baseball player (born 1976)

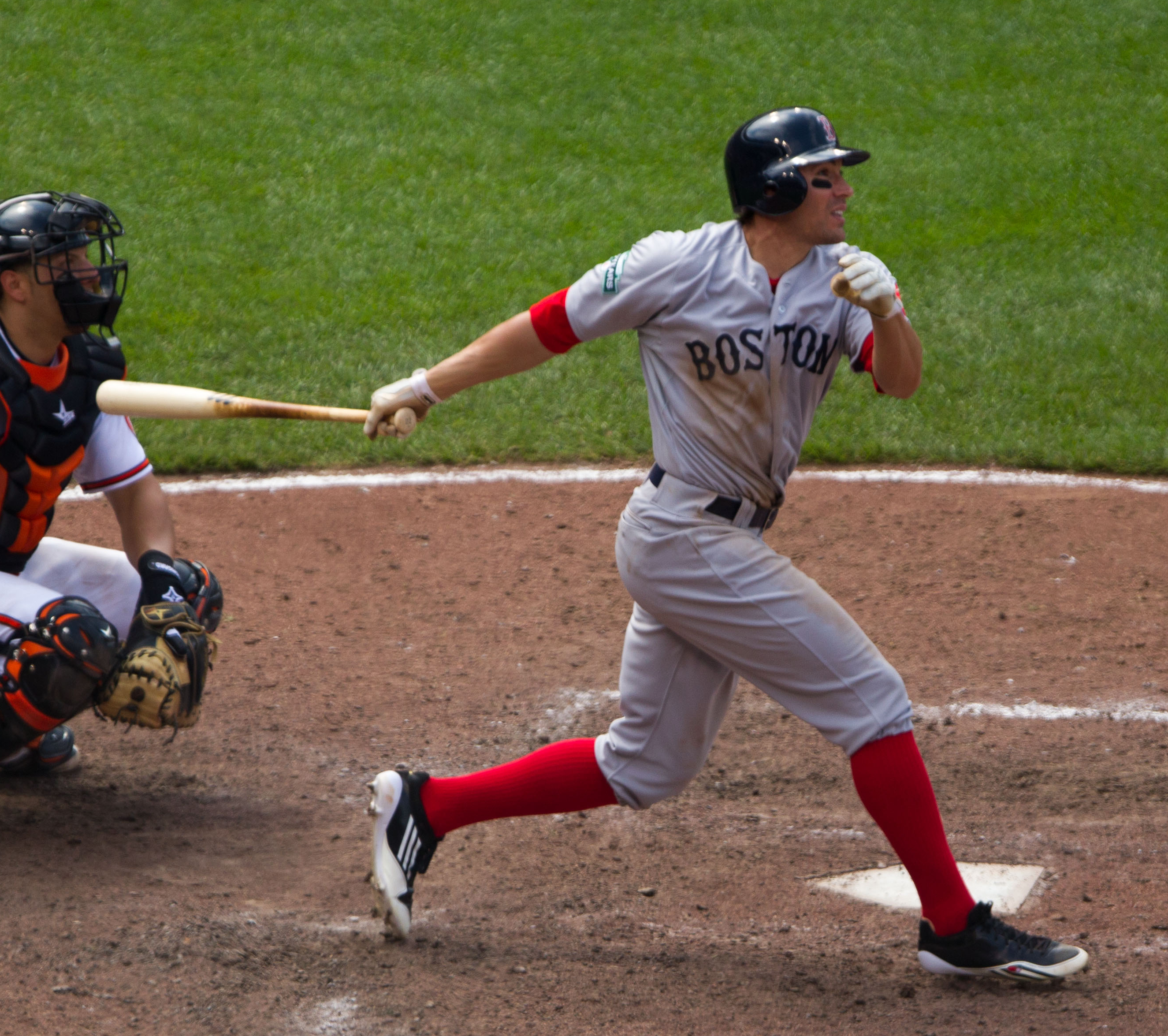
- Podsednik with the Boston Red Sox in 2012
- Outfielder
- Born: March 18, 1976 (age 50); West, Texas, U.S.
- Batted: Left Threw: Left

MLB debut
- July 6, 2001, for the Seattle Mariners

Last MLB appearance
- October 3, 2012, for the Boston Red Sox

MLB statistics
- Batting average: .281
- Home runs: 42
- Runs batted in: 312
- Stolen bases: 309
- Stats at Baseball Reference

Teams
- Seattle Mariners (2001–2002); Milwaukee Brewers (2003–2004); Chicago White Sox (2005–2007); Colorado Rockies (2008); Chicago White Sox (2009); Kansas City Royals (2010); Los Angeles Dodgers (2010); Boston Red Sox (2012)

Career highlights and awards
- All-Star (2005); World Series champion (2005); NL stolen base leader (2004)

Scott Eric Podsednik (/pədˈsɛdnɪk/; born March 18, 1976) is an American former professional baseball outfielder in Major League Baseball (MLB). Best known for his baserunning, Podsednik led the major leagues in stolen bases in 2004 with 70, in times caught stealing in 2005 with 23, and the American League in times caught stealing in 2006 with 19. He won the World Series with the 2005 Chicago White Sox, hitting a walk-off home run in Game 2.

== Early life ==
Podsednik was born to Duane and Amy Podsednik in West, Texas. Duane worked at a glass plant in Waco and Amy worked at West High School. Podsednik ran track and played baseball at West High School and received scholarship offers to run the hurdles and 200 meters at such schools as Texas, Texas A&M and TCU. Podsednik was his high school's prom king in 1994.

== Professional career ==
=== Minor leagues ===
Podsednik was drafted out of West High School in the 3rd round, 85th overall, in the 1994 Major League Baseball draft by the Texas Rangers. He began his professional career with the Gulf Coast Rangers in 1994. The Rangers traded him (along with Wilson Heredia) to the Florida Marlins for pitcher Bobby Witt on October 8, 1995. He spent the next two seasons playing for the Marlins class-A affiliates.

On December 15, 1997, he returned to the Rangers in the minor league portion of the Rule 5 draft. He was promoted to the Double-A Tulsa Drillers in 1998. He remained with Tulsa through the 2000 season when he was granted free agency.

He signed with the Seattle Mariners as a minor league free agent and was placed at the Triple-A level with the Tacoma Rainiers. Podsednik spent nine years in the minors with significant time lost to injury.

=== Major leagues ===
==== Seattle Mariners ====
He made his Major League debut on July 6, 2001, against the Los Angeles Dodgers, pinch-running for Ichiro Suzuki. In his first career major league at-bat, against the Arizona Diamondbacks on July 15, he hit a bases loaded triple.

In 2002, Podsednik played mostly at Triple-A Tacoma, but was activated for 14 Major League games, hitting his first major-league home run during that time.

==== Milwaukee Brewers ====
After the 2002 season, Podsednik was acquired by the Milwaukee Brewers organization from Seattle for $20,000. He rebounded with a fine rookie season in Milwaukee, compiling a .314 batting average, 43 stolen bases, 100 runs scored, 175 hits, 29 doubles, eight triples, nine home runs, 58 runs batted in, 56 walks and a .379 on-base percentage for the Brewers, and finished second to the Florida Marlins' Dontrelle Willis in the official Rookie of the Year balloting.

The 2004 season saw Podsednik lead the league with 70 stolen bases.

==== Chicago White Sox ====
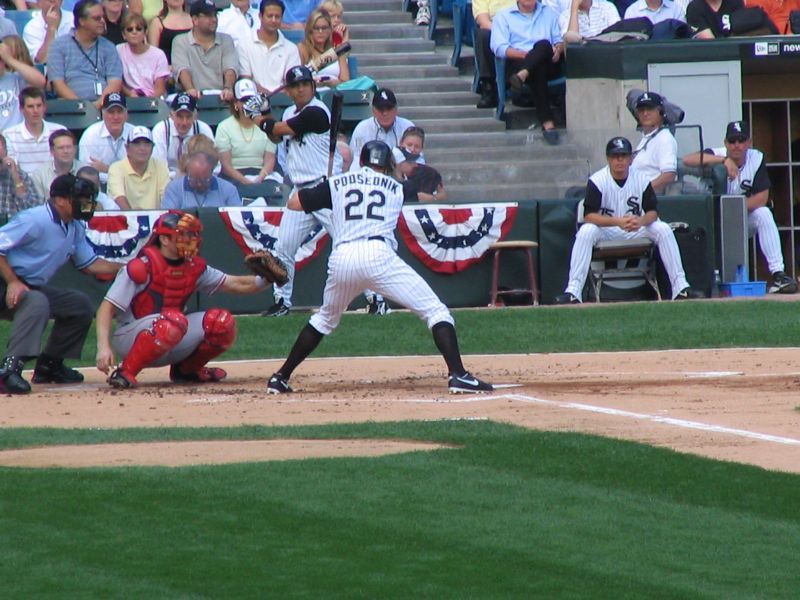
Podsednik batting for the Chicago White Sox in 2005 American League Division Series.

In December 2004, Podsednik was dealt to the Chicago White Sox (along with Travis Hinton and Luis Vizcaíno) for Carlos Lee. After leading all of the Major Leagues in steals the first half of 2005, he was selected to his first All-Star game via the MLB's All-Star Final Vote. He saw only defensive time in the All-Star game in Detroit that year and did not get a chance to bat.

Podsednik ended 2005 with 59 steals (second in the American League) and 23 times caught stealing (leading the major leagues) despite missing several games due to injury. In the postseason he started all 12 games and hit .286 while stealing six bases on nine attempts. In Game 2 of the 2005 World Series, while facing Brad Lidge in the bottom of the 9th inning, with the White Sox and Astros tied at 6, Podsednik hit a 2–1 fastball into the right field stands for a walk-off home run, only the 14th in World Series history. The feat was all the more improbable because Podsednik did not hit any home runs during the regular season in 2005, and had only hit one in the ALDS against the Red Sox. Two days later in Game 3, he set a World Series record of eight at-bats in a single World Series Game.

In 2006, Podsednik once again led the league with 19 times caught stealing.

On November 20, 2007, Podsednik was designated for assignment and released on November 28, 2007.

==== Colorado Rockies ====
On February 5, 2008, he signed a minor league contract with an invitation to spring training with the Colorado Rockies. He appeared in 93 games for the Rockies and hit .253. A free agent at the end of the season, he re-signed with the Rockies on January 14, 2009, but was released before the 2009 season started.

==== Return to Chicago White Sox ====
On April 14, 2009, Podsednik agreed to return to the White Sox on a minor-league deal, and was assigned to the AAA Charlotte Knights. On April 30, Podsednik was promoted to the major league team. He was given plenty of playing time upon his recall, with injuries to Sox center fielders DeWayne Wise and Brian Anderson, as well as to left fielder Carlos Quentin. Podsednik hit .304 in his return to the South Side.

==== Kansas City Royals ====
On January 8, 2010, Podsednik signed a contract with the Kansas City Royals. He hit .309 in 94 games with the Royals, and stole 30 bases.

==== Los Angeles Dodgers ====
On July 28, 2010, the Royals traded Podsednik to the Los Angeles Dodgers in return for two minor league players, catcher Lucas May and pitcher Elisaul Pimentel. He appeared in 39 games for the Dodgers, with a .262 batting average and five stolen bases. He was shut down for the season in early September because of a foot injury. After the season, he declined his half of a mutual option and became a free agent.

==== Toronto Blue Jays ====
On February 16, 2011, Podsednik signed a minor league contract with an invitation to spring training. He played for the Las Vegas 51s in the Pacific Coast League as a member of the Toronto Blue Jays organization. He was released on May 11.

==== Philadelphia Phillies ====
Podsednik signed a minor league contract with the Philadelphia Phillies on May 22, 2011. He was assigned to their Triple-A affiliate, the Lehigh Valley IronPigs, but was limited to playing in just 14 games due to injuries.

The Phillies signed Podsednik to another minor league deal on November 30, 2011. Even after an impressive Spring training, Podsednik was again sent to Triple-A Lehigh Valley.

==== Boston Red Sox ====
On May 11, 2012, Podsednik was traded to the Boston Red Sox for cash considerations. Podsednik was promoted to Boston May 22 to help with an outfield that saw seven players on the disabled list. On May 22, 2012, he made his debut, his first major league action since 2010, pinch hitting for Marlon Byrd in the seventh inning of a game against the Baltimore Orioles. On the following day, also against the Baltimore Orioles, Podsednik was the starting right fielder, and hit a home run.

On July 31, 2012, Podsednik was traded to the Arizona Diamondbacks, along with RHP Matt Albers, for LHP Craig Breslow. He was released the next day after refusing a Triple-A assignment. On August 9, 2012, Podsednik re-signed with the Red Sox on a major league contract. He retired after the 2012 season.

== Personal life ==
Podsednik married long-time girlfriend, Lindsey, in the spring of 2025. He was previously married to sportscaster Lisa Dergan from 2008-2017. His sister Shana is married to former Texas Rangers baseball player, Kevin Mench.

== See also ==
- List of Major League Baseball career stolen bases leaders
- List of Major League Baseball annual stolen base leaders

Preceded by Brad Wilkerson	Sporting News NL Rookie of the Year; 2003	Succeeded by Jason Bay
Preceded by Jason Jennings	Players Choice NL Most Outstanding Rookie; 2003	Succeeded by Jason Bay
