= 2005 American League Division Series =

Teams
Team (Wins)		Manager	Season
Chicago White Sox (3)		Ozzie Guillén	99–63 (.611), GA: 6
Boston Red Sox (0)		Terry Francona	95–67 (.586), GA: 0
- Dates: October 4–7
- Television: ESPN (Games 1–2); ESPN2 (Game 3)
- TV announcers: Chris Berman, Rick Sutcliffe, Mike Piazza, and Erin Andrews
- Radio: ESPN
- Radio announcers: Jon Sciambi and Buck Martinez
- Umpires: John Hirschbeck, Bill Miller, Mark Wegner, Mark Carlson (Game 1), Dale Scott (Games 2–3), Mike Everitt, Dan Iassogna

Teams
Team (Wins)		Manager	Season
Los Angeles Angels of Anaheim (3)		Mike Scioscia	95–67 (.586), GA: 7
New York Yankees (2)		Joe Torre	95–67 (.586), GA: 0
- Dates: October 4–10
- Television: Fox (Games 1, 4–5); ESPN (Games 2–3)
- TV announcers: Joe Buck, Tim McCarver, and Chris Myers (Games 1, 5); Jon Miller, Joe Morgan, and Gary Miller (Games 2–3); Thom Brennaman, Tim McCarver, and Chris Myers (Game 4)
- Radio: ESPN
- Radio announcers: Dan Shulman and Dave Campbell
- Umpires: Gary Darling, Jerry Meals, Derryl Cousins, Alfonso Márquez, Joe West, Jim Reynolds

The 2005 American League Division Series (ALDS) consisted of two best-of-five playoff series on the American League side in Major League Baseball’s (MLB) 2005 postseason, began on Tuesday, October 4, and ended on Monday, October 10, with the champions of the three AL divisions—along with a "wild card" team—participating in two series.

Under MLB's playoff format, no two teams from the same division were matched up in the Division Series, regardless of whether their records would normally indicate such a matchup. Home field advantage went to the team with the better regular-season record with the exception of the wild card team, which defers home field advantage regardless of record. The matchups were:

- (1) Chicago White Sox (AL Central champions) vs. (4) Boston Red Sox (Wild Card qualifier): White Sox won the series, 3–0.
- (2) Los Angeles Angels of Anaheim (AL West champions) vs. (3) New York Yankees (AL East champions): Angels won the series, 3–2.

The higher seeded team in each series hosts Games 1, 2, and 5 (if necessary), and the lower seeded team hosts Games 3 and 4 (if necessary).

2005 was the first year since 2001 that the Minnesota Twins had not participated in the ALDS. Other than the White Sox' victory in the AL Central, the participants were identical to those of the previous year.

The White Sox and Angels went on to meet in the AL Championship Series (ALCS). The White Sox advanced to defeat the National League champion Houston Astros and win the 2005 World Series in a four-game sweep, their first World Series title since 1917.

== Matchups ==
=== Chicago White Sox vs. Boston Red Sox ===
Chicago won the series, 3–0.

Game	Date	Score	Location	Time	Attendance
1	October 4	Boston Red Sox – 2, Chicago White Sox – 14	U.S. Cellular Field	2:56	40,717
2	October 5	Boston Red Sox – 4, Chicago White Sox – 5	U.S. Cellular Field	2:29	40,799
3	October 7	Chicago White Sox – 5, Boston Red Sox – 3	Fenway Park	3:28	35,496

=== Los Angeles Angels of Anaheim vs. New York Yankees ===
Los Angeles won the series, 3–2.

Game	Date	Score	Location	Time	Attendance
1	October 4	New York Yankees – 4, Los Angeles Angels of Anaheim – 2	Angel Stadium of Anaheim	2:59	45,142
2	October 5	New York Yankees – 3, Los Angeles Angels of Anaheim – 5	Angel Stadium of Anaheim	3:05	45,150
3	October 7	Los Angeles Angels of Anaheim – 11, New York Yankees – 7	Yankee Stadium (I)	4:00	56,277
4	October 9†	Los Angeles Angels of Anaheim – 2, New York Yankees – 3	Yankee Stadium (I)	3:13	56,226
5	October 10	New York Yankees – 3, Los Angeles Angels of Anaheim – 5	Angel Stadium of Anaheim	3:29	45,133

†: Game was postponed due to rain on October 8

== Chicago vs. Boston ==
=== Game 1 ===
October 4, 2005 3:11 pm (CDT) at U.S. Cellular Field in Chicago, Illinois 85 °F (29 °C), partly cloudy
Team	1	2	3	4	5	6	7	8	9	R	H	E
Boston	0	0	0	2	0	0	0	0	0	2	9	0
Chicago	5	0	1	2	0	4	0	2	X	14	11	1
WP: José Contreras (1–0) LP: Matt Clement (0–1); Home runs: BOS: None; CWS: A. J. Pierzynski 2 (2), Paul Konerko (1), Juan Uribe (1), Scott Podsednik (1); Attendance: 40,717; Boxscore

The White Sox rocked Red Sox starter Matt Clement for five runs in the first inning. Clement hit Scott Podsednik to lead off the game. Podsednik moved to second on a sacrifice bunt, then stole third after another hit-by-pitch, scoring the game's first run on Paul Konerko's force out at second. Konerko would himself score on Aaron Rowand's RBI single before A. J. Pierzynski's three-run home run made it 5–0 Chicago. Konerko's home run in the third made it 6–0 White Sox. The Red Sox scored their only runs of the game in the fourth when Trot Nixon and Jason Varitek hit back-to-back singles aided by an error to put them on third and second, respectively. Jose Contreras's wild pitch scored Nixon, then Kevin Millar's double scored Varitek. Contreras went 7 2/3 innings, giving up eight hits. In the bottom of the fourth, Juan Uribe's two-run home run extended Chicago's lead to 8–2 and forced Clement out of the game. Geremi Gonzalez allowed a leadoff walk and subsequent hit-by-pitch in the sixth. One out later, a single by Uribe scored a run, then Scott Podsednik's three-run home run made it 12–2 Chicago. Podsednik had gone homerless in the regular season and this was his first home run since September 30, 2004. In the eighth, Pierzynski's second home run of the game off Bronson Arroyo made it 13–2 Chicago. After two walks, Willie Harris's RBI single capped the scoring at 14–2 Chicago. Cliff Politte pitched a scoreless ninth to give the White Sox a 1–0 series lead. Boston's postseason winning streak was snapped at eight games with this loss. This was the White Sox' first postseason home win since Game 1 of the 1959 World Series.

=== Game 2 ===
October 5, 2005 6:09 pm (CDT) at U.S. Cellular Field in Chicago, Illinois 81 °F (27 °C), clear
Team	1	2	3	4	5	6	7	8	9	R	H	E
Boston	2	0	2	0	0	0	0	0	0	4	9	1
Chicago	0	0	0	0	5	0	0	0	X	5	9	0
WP: Mark Buehrle (1–0) LP: David Wells (0–1) Sv: Bobby Jenks (1); Home runs: BOS: None; CWS: Tadahito Iguchi (1); Attendance: 40,799; Boxscore

The Red Sox struck first in Game 2 on Manny Ramirez's two-run single off Mark Buehrle with runners on second and third. In the fourth, they loaded the bases on a single, double and intentional walk before Jason Varitek's single and Trot Nixon's groundout scored a run each. David Wells (6 2/3 innings, two earned runs, seven hits) looked tough, giving up only two hits in the first four innings. But in the White Sox half of the fifth, the White Sox struck pay-dirt. Carl Everett hit a leadoff single, then scored on Aaron Rowand's double. One out later, Rowand scored on Joe Crede's single. Boston second baseman's Tony Graffanino error on Juan Uribe's ground ball put two runners on and one out later, Tadahito Iguchi's three-run home run put the White Sox up 5–4, those three runs unearned. Buehrle (seven innings, four earned runs, eight hits) earned the win with the save going to Bobby Jenks.

=== Game 3 ===
October 7, 2005 4:09 pm (EDT) at Fenway Park in Boston, Massachusetts 75 °F (24 °C), cloudy
Team	1	2	3	4	5	6	7	8	9	R	H	E
Chicago	0	0	2	0	0	2	0	0	1	5	8	0
Boston	0	0	0	2	0	1	0	0	0	3	7	1
WP: Freddy García (1–0) LP: Tim Wakefield (0–1) Sv: Bobby Jenks (2); Home runs: CWS: Paul Konerko (2); BOS: David Ortiz (1), Manny Ramírez 2 (2); Attendance: 35,496; Boxscore

For the first time since 1993, the White Sox secured their place in the ALCS by beating the Red Sox in Game 3. Freddy García (five innings, five hits, three earned runs) faced Tim Wakefield (5 1/3 innings, six hits, four runs). The White Sox struck first, when Juan Uribe doubled with two outs, then Scott Podsednik's double and Tadahito Iguchi's single scored a run each in the third. Back-to-back home runs by David Ortiz and Manny Ramirez leading off the fourth tied the game. In the sixth, Paul Konerko, with Jermaine Dye on base, hit a home run to put the White Sox in the lead for good. Ramirez's second home run of the game in the bottom of the inning cut the lead to 4–3, then Damaso Marte relieved Garcia and allowed a single and two walks to load the bases with no outs. El Duque, Orlando Hernández, came in relief and induced Jason Varitek to foul out, Tony Graffanino to pop out to short, and Johnny Damon to strike out to end the inning without giving up another run. He proceeded to pitch three total innings, giving up one hit. The White Sox got an insurance run in the ninth off Mike Timlin when A. J. Pierzynski hit a leadoff double, moved to third on a groundout and scored on Juan Uribe's fielder's choice. Bobby Jenks retired the Red Sox in order in the bottom half, earning his second save of the series. This was the White Sox's first postseason series win since the 1917 World Series.

=== Composite line score ===
2005 ALDS (3–0): Chicago White Sox over Boston Red Sox

Team	1	2	3	4	5	6	7	8	9	R	H	E
Chicago White Sox	5	0	3	2	5	6	0	2	1	24	28	1
Boston Red Sox	2	0	2	4	0	1	0	0	0	9	25	2
Total attendance: 117,012 Average attendance: 39,004

== Los Angeles vs. New York ==
=== Game 1 ===
October 4, 2005 5:20 pm (PDT) at Angel Stadium of Anaheim in Anaheim, California 78 °F (26 °C), clear
Team	1	2	3	4	5	6	7	8	9	R	H	E
New York	3	1	0	0	0	0	0	0	0	4	9	0
Los Angeles	0	0	0	0	0	0	1	0	1	2	7	0
WP: Mike Mussina (1–0) LP: Bartolo Colón (0–1) Sv: Mariano Rivera (1); Home runs: NYY: None; LAA: Bengie Molina (1); Attendance: 45,142; Boxscore

The Yankees were able to get to AL Cy Young Award winner Bartolo Colón early. Three two-out singles loaded the bases in the top of the first, then rookie Robinson Canó lifted a line drive over the reaching hand of left fielder Garret Anderson. The double would clear the bases, giving the Yankees a 3–0 lead. Next inning, Derek Jeter singled with two outs, moved to second on a hit-by-pitch, and scored on Jason Giambi's single. Though Colón and Scot Shields held the Yankees scoreless for the rest of the game, starter Mike Mussina pitched 5 2/3 innings. Bengie Molina's home run in the seventh off Tanyon Sturtze put the Angels on the board. In the ninth, Mariano Rivera walked Vladimir Guerrero with one out. After stealing second, Guerrero scored on Darin Erstad's single, but Rivera retired the next two batters to give the Yankees a 1–0 series lead.

=== Game 2 ===
October 5, 2005 7:09 pm (PDT) at Angel Stadium of Anaheim in Anaheim, California 81 °F (27 °C), clear
Team	1	2	3	4	5	6	7	8	9	R	H	E
New York	0	1	0	0	1	0	0	0	1	3	6	3
Los Angeles	0	0	0	0	1	1	2	1	X	5	7	0
WP: Kelvim Escobar (1–0) LP: Chien-Ming Wang (0–1) Sv: Francisco Rodríguez (1); Home runs: NYY: Jorge Posada (1); LAA: Juan Rivera (1), Bengie Molina (2); Attendance: 45,150; Boxscore

In Game 2, the starters were John Lackey for the Angels and Chien-Ming Wang for the Yankees. The Yankees scored the first run of the game in the second when Hideki Matsui and Robinson Canó hit back-to-back doubles. They made it 2–0 in the fifth after Alex Rodríguez walked, moved to third on Jason Giambi's double and scored on Gary Sheffield's ground out. The Angels got on the board in the bottom of that inning on Juan Rivera's home run. In the sixth, Alex Rodríguez's error allowed Orlando Cabrera to make it to first base. He would move to second on Vladimir Guerrero's ground out and score on Bengie Molina's single, tying the game at two. In the next inning, Wang's throwing error would allow Jeff DaVanon and Steve Finley to reach third and second, respectively. Both scored on Cabrera's single, giving the Angels a 4–2 lead. In the eighth, Molina's home run off Al Leiter extended the Angels lead to three. In the ninth, Jorge Posada's home run off Francisco Rodriguez cut the lead back to two, but K. Rod retired the next three batters to end the game and tie the series heading to New York.

=== Game 3 ===
October 7, 2005 8:09 pm (EDT) at Yankee Stadium (I) in Bronx, New York 74 °F (23 °C), rain
Team	1	2	3	4	5	6	7	8	9	R	H	E
Los Angeles	3	0	2	0	0	2	2	2	0	11	19	1
New York	0	0	0	4	2	0	0	1	0	7	12	2
WP: Scot Shields (1–0) LP: Aaron Small (0–1); Home runs: LAA: Garret Anderson (1), Bengie Molina (3); NYY: Hideki Matsui (1), Derek Jeter (1); Attendance: 56,277; Boxscore

In Game 3, it was Randy Johnson pitching for the Yankees while Paul Byrd pitched for the Angels. Johnson ran into trouble early, giving up a three-run home run to Garret Anderson in the first after back-to-back two-out singles and a two-run homer to Bengie Molina in the third to give the Angels a 5–0 lead. After allowing a double and single in the fourth without getting an out, Johnson was taken out of the game while being booed. The Yankees rallied in the bottom of the inning. First, Hideki Matsui homered to put the Yanks on the board 5–1. Then Robinson Canó and Bernie Williams hit back to back singles and moved one base each on a groundout. Canó scored on Jorge Posada's groundout and Williams on Derek Jeter's single. After a walk, Brendan Donnelly relieved Byrd and Jason Giambi's single scored Jeter and cut the Angels' lead to one. In the next inning, after Matsui walked, Canó doubled to left and a throwing error by Cabrera allowed Matsui to score and Canó to go to third. Scot Shields relieved Donnelly and gave up a sacrifice fly to Bernie Williams that scored Canó, giving the Yankees a 6–5 lead, but in the sixth Reliever Aaron Small allowed a one-out double to Juan Rivera before Darin Erstad's RBI single tied the game. After a strikeout and single, Chone Figgins's RBI single put the Angels back in front 7–6. Tom Gordon allowed a leadoff single and subsequent hit-by-pitch before Garret Anderson's RBI single made it 8–6 Angels. Two errors loaded the bases before Steve Finley's RBI groundout off Al Leiter made it 9–6 Angels. In the eighth, Leiter allowed a leadoff triple, then after a one-out intentional walk, back-to-back RBI singles by José Molina and Anderson off Scott Proctor made it 11–6 Angels. The Yankees got only one more run on Jeter's leadoff home run in the eighth off Kelvim Escobar as the Angels' 11–7 win put them one win away from the ALCS.

=== Game 4 ===
October 9, 2005 7:56 pm (EDT) at Yankee Stadium (I) in Bronx, New York 61 °F (16 °C), cloudy
Team	1	2	3	4	5	6	7	8	9	R	H	E
Los Angeles	0	0	0	0	0	2	0	0	0	2	4	0
New York	0	0	0	0	0	1	2	0	X	3	4	1
WP: Al Leiter (1–0) LP: Scot Shields (1–1) Sv: Mariano Rivera (2); Attendance: 56,226; Boxscore

The Angels struck first in Game 4, scoring two runs in the top of the sixth on two doubles by Chone Figgins and Orlando Cabrera off Yankees starting pitcher Shawn Chacón after a leadoff walk. The Yankees cut the lead to one in the bottom of the inning when Alex Rodriguez walked, moved to second on a groundout and scored on Gary Sheffield's single off Angels starting pitcher John Lackey. In the bottom of the next inning, Robinson Canó singled and Jorge Posada walked off Scot Shields. They would score on singles from Rubén Sierra and Derek Jeter. Al Leiter earned the win in relief and Mariano Rivera pitched a perfect eighth and ninth as the Yankees won 3–2 to force a Game 5 back in Anaheim.

=== Game 5 ===
October 10, 2005 5:16 pm (PDT) at Angel Stadium of Anaheim in Anaheim, California 77 °F (25 °C), clear
Team	1	2	3	4	5	6	7	8	9	R	H	E
New York	0	2	0	0	0	0	1	0	0	3	11	0
Los Angeles	0	3	2	0	0	0	0	0	X	5	9	0
WP: Ervin Santana (1–0) LP: Mike Mussina (1–1) Sv: Francisco Rodríguez (2); Home runs: NYY: Derek Jeter (2); LAA: Garret Anderson (2); Attendance: 45,133; Boxscore

Game 5 had the same starting pitchers as in Game 1, Bartolo Colón for the Angels and Mike Mussina for the Yankees. Colón left the game in the second inning after walking Robinson Canó (who was caught stealing) due to a hand injury and giving up two hits in the first and was relieved by Ervin Santana, who walked Bernie Williams and Jorge Posada. Williams scored on Bubba Crosby's single and Posada on Derek Jeter's sacrifice fly as the Yankees took an early 2–0 lead. Mussina, however, after pitching a perfect first, allowed a leadoff home run to Garret Anderson in the second to cut the lead to one. Then, Bengie Molina singled to center. After getting two outs, Mussina walked Steve Finley before Adam Kennedy hit the ball to right center. Bubba Crosby and Gary Sheffield collided on the outfield wall trying to catch it, allowing Molina and Finley to score to give the Angels a 3–2 lead. Next inning, Mussina allowed back-to-back leadoff singles to put runners on first and third, then Anderson's sacrifice fly scored a run. After a single again put runners on first and third, Darin Erstad's RBI single extended the Angels' lead to 5–2. Mussina was pulled from the game one out later in his shortest postseason start ever. Randy Johnson, making his first postseason relief appearance since Game 7 of the 2001 World Series with the Arizona Diamondbacks against the Yankees, kept the Angels scoreless for the rest of the game, allowing just three hits. Jeter's home run in the seventh off Santana cut the lead to two. Jeter opened the ninth with a single off closer Francisco Rodríguez, but Alex Rodriguez grounded into a double play. Jason Giambi and Gary Sheffield both hit singles afterward, but Hideki Matsui grounded out to first to end the game. The Angels would face the Chicago White Sox in the ALCS.

=== Composite line score ===
2005 ALDS (3–2): Los Angeles Angels of Anaheim over New York Yankees

Team	1	2	3	4	5	6	7	8	9	R	H	E
Los Angeles Angels of Anaheim	3	3	4	0	1	5	5	3	1	25	46	1
New York Yankees	3	4	0	4	3	1	3	1	1	20	42	6
Total attendance: 247,928 Average attendance: 49,586
