= Hermannsson =

Hermannsson is a surname. Notable people with the surname include:

- Björgvin Hermannsson (born 1938), Icelandic former footballer
- Hermann Hermannsson (1914–1975), Icelandic former footballer
- Hjörtur Hermannsson (born 1995), Icelandic professional footballer
- Martin Hermannsson (born 1994), Icelandic basketball player
- Steingrímur Hermannsson (1928–2010), Prime Minister of Iceland
- Sverrir Hermannsson (born 1930), Icelandic politician, businessman, and banker

== See also ==
- First cabinet of Steingrímur Hermannsson in Iceland was formed 26 May 1983
- Second cabinet of Steingrímur Hermannsson in Iceland was formed 28 September 1988
- Third cabinet of Steingrímur Hermannsson in Iceland was formed 10 September 1989
- Hermansen
- Hermanson
- Hermansson
