= Dustin Hermanson =

American baseball player (born 1972)

- Pitcher
- Born: December 21, 1972 (age 53); Springfield, Ohio, U.S.
- Batted: Right Threw: Right

MLB debut
- May 8, 1995, for the San Diego Padres

Last MLB appearance
- September 24, 2006, for the Chicago White Sox

MLB statistics
- Win–loss record: 73–78
- Earned run average: 4.21
- Strikeouts: 874
- Stats at Baseball Reference

Teams
- San Diego Padres (1995–1996); Montreal Expos (1997–2000); St. Louis Cardinals (2001); Boston Red Sox (2002); St. Louis Cardinals (2003); San Francisco Giants (2003–2004); Chicago White Sox (2005–2006)

Career highlights and awards
- World Series champion (2005)

Dustin Michael Hermanson (born December 21, 1972) is an American former right-handed pitcher in Major League Baseball (MLB). Hermanson pitched for several MLB teams between 1995 and 2006, including the World Series champion 2005 Chicago White Sox. Hermanson served as the team's closer for the majority of the season, and racked up 34 saves before sustaining a back injury in September, limiting his appearances throughout the remainder of the season and throughout the playoffs.

== Early life ==
Hermanson was born in Springfield, Ohio, and he attended Kenton Ridge High School in Springfield. He played three seasons of college baseball for Kent State, where his fastball increased in speed from 88 mph to 96 mph. He was a finalist for the Golden Spikes Award in 1994. He was selected in the first round of the 1994 Major League Baseball draft with the third overall selection by the San Diego Padres. Hermanson split the 1994 season between Double-A and Triple-A before making his MLB debut in 1995.

== MLB career ==
Hermanson played for the Padres and their Triple-A affiliate, the Las Vegas Stars, in 1995 and 1996. He then played for the Montreal Expos for four seasons before moving around to the St. Louis Cardinals, Boston Red Sox, San Francisco Giants, and Chicago White Sox. With Montreal and St. Louis, Hermanson was a starting pitcher early in his career, but moved mostly into a relief role starting in 2002. It was also during his first season with Montreal that he had his first ever at-bat, hitting a home run off Shane Reynolds in the fifth inning, one of only a handful of pitchers to achieve this feat.

In 2005 Hermanson served as the second of three closers for the White Sox. Hermanson replaced a struggling Shingo Takatsu. Hermanson saved 34 games before suffering a late-season back injury. Hermanson was replaced by rookie Bobby Jenks in late September. Hermanson finished the season with a 2.04 ERA, and his injury limited him to a single appearance in the 2005 playoffs.

On October 30, 2006, the White Sox declined a 2007 option for $3.65 million on Hermanson. He received a $500,000 payout. He signed a minor league deal with a spring training invitation with the Reds on March 1, 2007. Hermanson was discussed as a possible closer for the Reds, but he had a 7.36 ERA in spring training and the Reds asked him to go to the minor leagues. Hermanson asked to be released instead of reporting to Triple-A.

By June 2007, Hermanson said he was probably finished playing baseball. He was dealing with a bad back, and he said he looked forward to being more available to his children.

== See also ==
- List of Major League Baseball players with a home run in their first major league at bat
