= Tormod Hermansen =

Norwegian economist and politician

State Secretary of Finansdepartementet
- In office 1978–1979

Personal details
- Occupation: CEO of Telenor

Tormod Hermansen (born 23 April 1940) is a former CEO of Telenor and State Secretary of Finansdepartementet (1978–1979).

His brother is Robert Hermansen.

Business positions
Preceded by Kjell Holler	CEO of Telenor; 1991-2002	Succeeded by Jon Fredrik Baksaas
