= Hermansen Island Bird Sanctuary =

Protected area in Svalbard, Norway

- Hermansenøya fuglereservat
- Location within Svalbard
- Coordinates: 78.5494°N 12.1962°E

Hermansen Island Bird Sanctuary (Norwegian: Hermansenøya fuglereservat) is a bird reserve at Svalbard, Norway, established in 1973. It includes Hermansen Island on the west coast of Oscar II Land. The protected area covers a total area of around 4,200,000 square metres (1,000 acres).
