= Kevin Hermansson =

Swedish rower

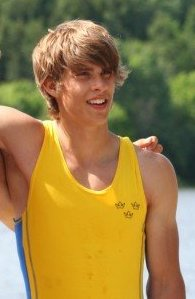

Personal information
- Nationality: (Sweden) Swedish
- Born: Kevin Charles Jonathan Hermansson; 13 March 1990 (age 36) Gothenburg, Sweden
- Height: 1.83 m (6 ft 0 in)
- Weight: 73 kg (161 lb)

Sport
- Sport: Rowing
- Club: Kungälvs Roddklubb

Kevin Charles Jonathan Hermansson (born 13 March 1990 in Gothenburg, Sweden) is a Swedish rower and part of the Swedish rowing team. He has competed in two separate world championships, junior WCH in Ottensheim, Austria 2008 and senior U23 WCH in Prague, the Czech Republic 2009.

Kevin has won the national championships for juniors five years a row and came 7th in the world junior champs 2008, even though he was a lightweight rower competing against mostly heavyweights. 2009 he was in strokeposition for Sweden's lightweight quad and they came 8th at the world U23 champs, with the time 6.00.90.

Kevin has not been competing internationally since his first child was born in 2010. In Sweden he is competing for "Kungälvs Roddklubb", the rowing club in Kungälv, 20 km north of Gothenburg.
