= Robert Hermansen =

Norwegian businessperson (born 1939)

Robert Hermansen (born 1939 in Botne) is a Norwegian businessperson.

He is a former chief executive of Store Norske Spitsbergen Kulkompani. He has been chairman of Troms Kraft since 2008. He has also chaired the board of the Regional Development Fund.

In 2011, B. Thorsen of Økokrim reported that Hermansen had confessed to formal charges of corruption. At his trial, he confessed to formal charges of corruption on 23 September 2011. He was sentenced to 2 years in prison, by Nord-Troms District Court on 3 October 2011.

His brother is Tormod Hermansen.
