= Hermansen Island =

Island in Svalbard, Norway

Native name: Hermansenøya
- Location within Svalbard

Geography
- Coordinates: 78.5494°N 12.1962°E

Administration
- Norway

Hermansen Island (Norwegian: Hermansenøya) is an island in Oscar II Land at Spitsbergen, Svalbard. It has a length of about three kilometers, and is located in Forlandsundet at the mouth of St. Jonsfjorden. The island is named after Norwegian naval officer Andreas Encke Hermansen. The island was protected as a bird reserve in 1973.
