= Herbert Hermansson =

Swedish politician

Herbert Hermansson (1906–1984) was a Swedish politician. He was a member of the Centre Party.
