= Luis Vizcaíno =

Dominican baseball player (born 1974)

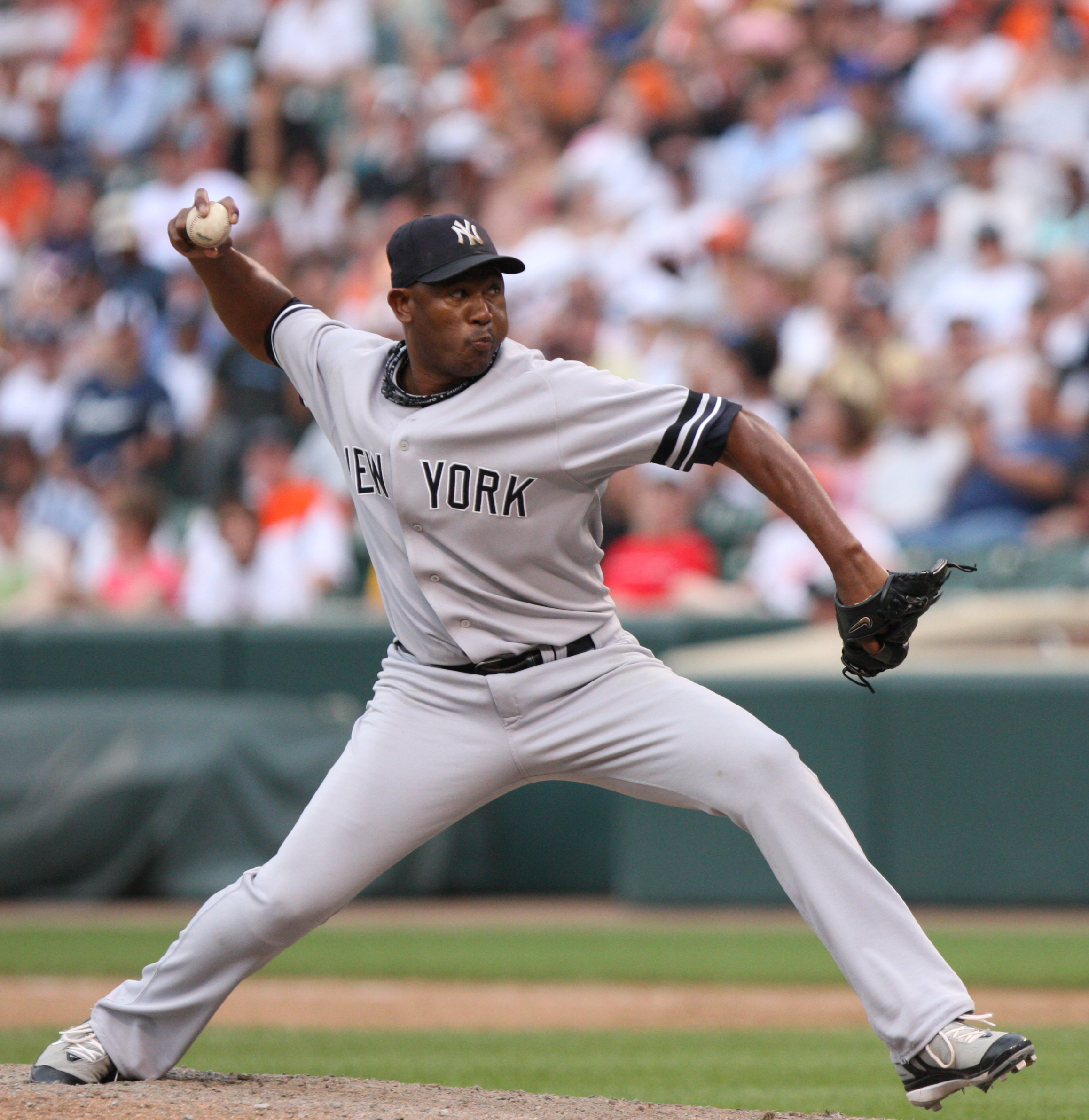
- Vizcaíno with the New York Yankees
- Pitcher
- Born: August 6, 1974 (age 52); Baní, Dominican Republic
- Batted: Right Threw: Right

Professional debut
- MLB: July 23, 1999, for the Oakland Athletics
- CPBL: August 24, 2013, for the Uni-President 7-Eleven Lions

Last appearance
- MLB: June 19, 2009, for the Cleveland Indians
- CPBL: August 7, 2014, for the EDA Rhinos

MLB statistics
- Win–loss record: 35–30
- Earned run average: 4.33
- Strikeouts: 492

CPBL statistics
- Win–loss record: 1–5
- Earned run average: 2.39
- Strikeouts: 35
- Stats at Baseball Reference

Teams
- Oakland Athletics (1999–2001); Milwaukee Brewers (2002–2004); Chicago White Sox (2005); Arizona Diamondbacks (2006); New York Yankees (2007); Colorado Rockies (2008); Chicago Cubs (2009); Cleveland Indians (2009); Uni-President 7-Eleven Lions (2013); EDA Rhinos (2014)

Career highlights and awards
- World Series champion (2005)

Luis Vizcaíno Árias (born August 6, 1974) is a Dominican former professional baseball pitcher. He played for the Oakland Athletics, Milwaukee Brewers, Chicago White Sox, Arizona Diamondbacks, New York Yankees, Colorado Rockies, Chicago Cubs, and Cleveland Indians in his career.

== Career ==
Vizcaíno was signed by the Oakland Athletics as an amateur free agent in 1994. After gradually working his way through the Athletics minor league system, he made one relief appearance for the A's in 1999, 12 in 2000, and 36 in 2001, but continued to spend significant time in Triple-A. In 2002, he was traded to the Texas Rangers for pitcher Justin Duchscherer, and the Rangers in turn traded him to the Milwaukee Brewers for Jesús Peña.

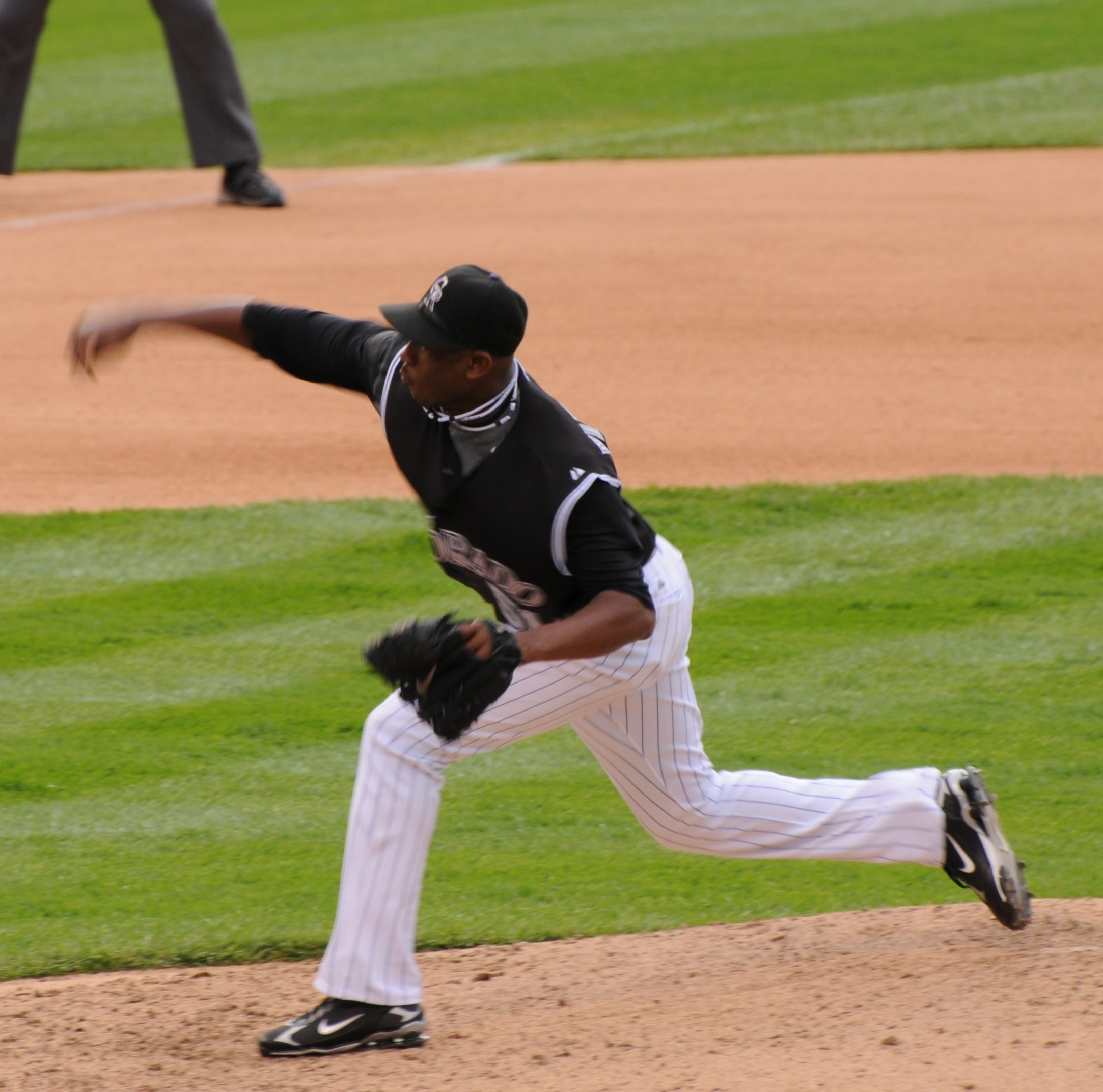
Luis Vizcaíno with the Colorado Rockies

In his three years with the Brewers, Vizcaíno was a workhorse. After an outstanding 2002 (5-3, 2.99 ERA, 76 appearances), he slumped badly in 2003 (4-3, 6.39 ERA, 75 appearances) before having a bounce-back 2004 campaign (4-4, 3.75 ERA, 73 appearances). Milwaukee then sent him to the Chicago White Sox along with Scott Podsednik and Travis Hinton for Carlos Lee.

With the White Sox, Vizcaíno had another solid year, going 6–5 with a 3.73 ERA in 65 appearances for the 2005 World Champions (he pitched one scoreless inning during the World Series in his only playoff appearance). After the season, Chicago traded him to the Arizona Diamondbacks. In 2006, Vizcaíno went 4-6 and posted a 3.75 ERA in 70 games for the Diamondbacks.

On January 9, 2007, Vizcaíno was traded to the New York Yankees with three prospects for Randy Johnson. He achieved a rare feat on July 21, 2007, when he was credited with both wins in relief in a day-night doubleheader for the Yankees, joining about 30 other pitchers.

In 2007, he pitched in 77 games, which was 4th-most in the AL. On December 21, 2007, he signed with the Colorado Rockies. On January 6, 2009, Vizcaíno was traded to the Chicago Cubs for Jason Marquis. Vizcaíno was designated for assignment and released by the Cubs on April 23, 2009.

On May 8, 2009, Vizcaíno signed a minor league deal with the Cleveland Indians. He then was signed to a major league deal on May 14. He was designated for assignment on June 23, and released on June 30 after clearing waivers.

Vizcaíno performed well in the Dominican Winter League following the 2010 season. On December 19, 2010, Vizcaíno signed a minor league contract to return with New York Yankees with an invitation to spring training. His contract was voided on February 9, 2011, because of a tear to his achilles tendon.

On June 29, 2011, he was suspended for 50 games by Major League Baseball for testing positive for the banned performance-enhancing drug stanozolol.

Despite pitching 546.2 career innings in the major leagues, Vizcaino handled 83 total chances (30 putouts, 53 assists) without an error.

Vizcaino signed a minor league deal with the Baltimore Orioles in January 2014. He was released in March, and ended his career with the Mexican League in 2015.

== Personal life ==
Vizcaino was born in Baní, Dominican Republic. Vizcaino's second cousin, José Vizcaíno, was a long-time MLB infielder.

On October 27, 2008, Vizcaíno was arrested in Tampa for driving under the influence after being pulled over for driving 71 miles per hour (114 km/h) in a 45 miles per hour (72 km/h) zone.
