= Alexander Hermansson (ice hockey) =

Swedish ice hockey player

- Born: March 8, 1988 (age 37); Karlstad, SWE
- Height: 5 ft 9 in (175 cm)
- Weight: 165 lb (75 kg; 11 st 11 lb)
- Position: Goaltender
- Catches: left
- SEL team: Färjestads BK
- Playing career: 2006–present

Alexander Hermansson (born March 8, 1988, in Karlstad, Sweden) is a professional Swedish ice hockey goaltender.

He is currently playing for Skåre in the third highest league in Sweden, on a loan from Färjestads BK. He has not played any games with Färjestad, but he has been the back-up goaltender for 9 games for Färjestad in the Swedish Elite League. Hermansson is not drafted by any NHL club.

== Career statistics ==
			Regular season											Playoffs
Season	Team	League	GP	W	L	T	MIN	GA	SO	GAA	SV%	Pts	PIM	GP	W	L	MIN	GA	SO	GAA	SV%	Pts	PIM
2003–04	Färjestads BK	J18 A	12	?	?	?	?	?	?	2.82	.906	0	0	2	?	?	?	?	?	?	?	?	?
2004–05	Färjestads BK	J18 A	12	?	?	?	?	?	?	3.24	.893	0	0	2	?	?	?	?	?	4.59	.833	0	0
2005–06	Färjestads BK	J18 A	14	?	?	?	?	?	?	3.24	.884	0	0	8	?	?	?	?	?	1.91	.939	0	0
2006–07	Skåre BK	Div-1	37	?	?	?	?	?	?	3.07	.896	0	0	?	?	?	?	?	?	?	?	?	?
2006–07	Färjestads BK	SEL	5	?	?	?	?	?	?	?	?	?	?	?	?	?	?	?	?	?	?	?	?
2007–08	Skåre BK	Div-1	27	?	?	?	?	?	?	2.37	.904	0	2	?	?	?	?	?	?	?	?	?	?
2007–08	Färjestads BK	SEL	4	?	?	?	?	?	?	?	?	?	?	?	?	?	?	?	?	?	?	?	?
2008–09	Sunne IK	Div-1	34	?	?	?	?	?	?	4.71	.878	1	1	?	?	?	?	?	?	?	?	?	?
SEL totals			9	--	--	--	--	--	--	--	--	--	--	--	--	--	--	--	--	--	--	--	--
Div-1 totals			98	--	--	--	--	--	--	3.38	.893	1	3	--	--	--	--	--	--	--	--	--	--
J18 A totals			38	--	--	--	--	--	--	3.10	.894	0	0	12	--	--	--	--	--	--	--	--	--
