= Bobby Jenks =

American baseball player (1981–2025)

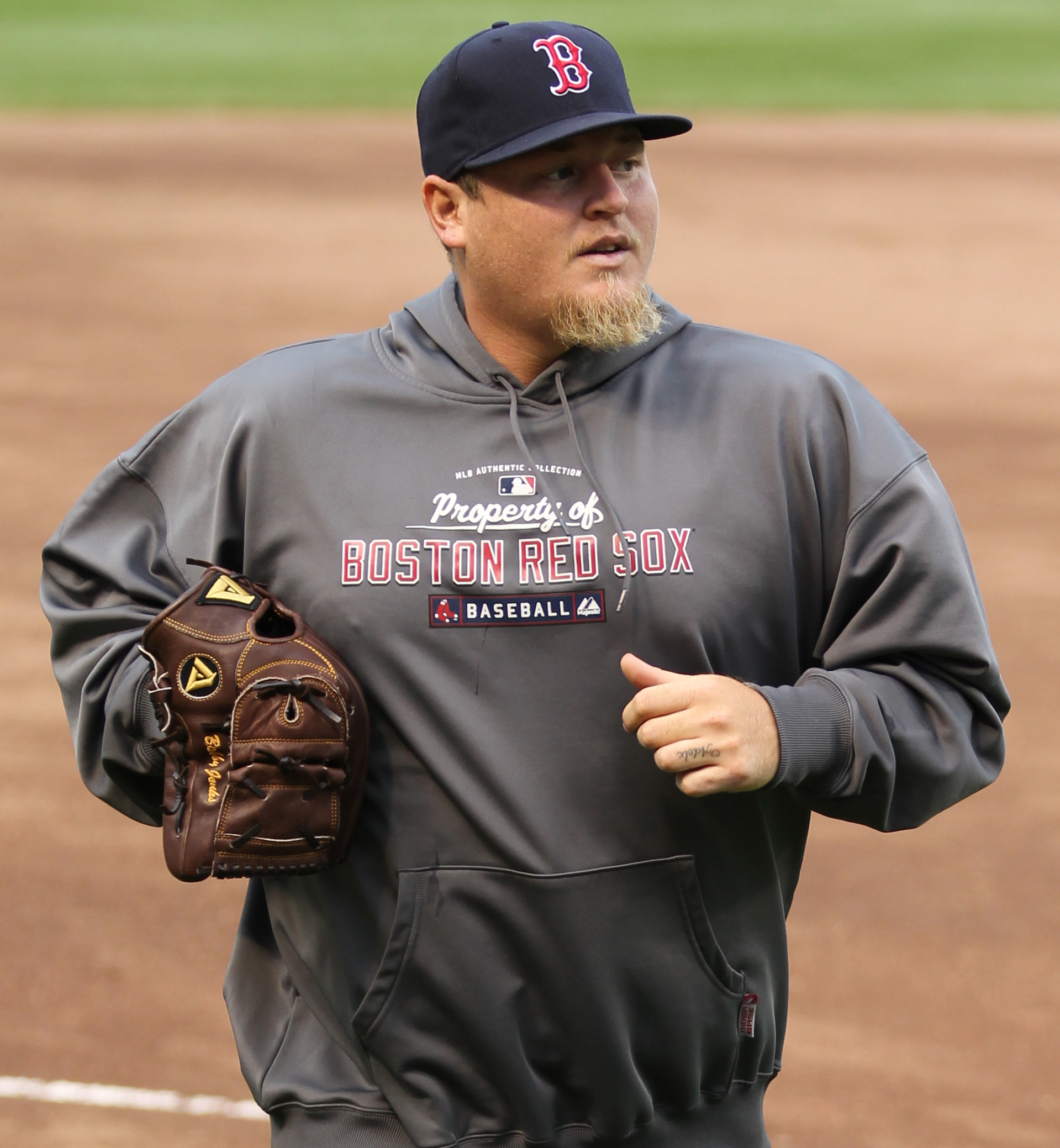
- Jenks with the Boston Red Sox in 2011
- Pitcher
- Born: March 14, 1981; Mission Hills, California, U.S.
- Died: July 4, 2025 (aged 44); Sintra, Portugal
- Batted: Right Threw: Right

MLB debut
- July 6, 2005, for the Chicago White Sox

Last MLB appearance
- July 7, 2011, for the Boston Red Sox

MLB statistics
- Win–loss record: 16–20
- Earned run average: 3.53
- Strikeouts: 351
- Saves: 173
- Stats at Baseball Reference

Teams
- Chicago White Sox (2005–2010); Boston Red Sox (2011)

Career highlights and awards
- 2× All-Star (2006, 2007); World Series champion (2005)

Robert Scott Jenks (March 14, 1981 – July 4, 2025) was an American professional baseball pitcher. He played in Major League Baseball (MLB) for the Chicago White Sox and Boston Red Sox from 2005 through 2011, and was a two-time All-Star. A relief pitcher, Jenks served as a closer for most of his career, and he ranks second in career saves among White Sox pitchers.

Jenks debuted in the major leagues on July 6, 2005, and was part of the White Sox's World Series–winning team that year, recording the championship-clinching out in Game 4. In 2007, he tied a then–major league record for consecutive batters retired (41), a mark that stood until 2009. His pitching was once clocked at 102 miles per hour (164 km/h). Following his retirement, Jenks served as a pitching coach and manager in the Pioneer League.

== Early life ==
Robert Scott Jenks was born on March 14, 1981, in Mission Hills, Los Angeles. Jenks moved with his family to Spirit Lake, Idaho, where he attended Timberlake High School, and then to Kenmore, Washington, attending Inglemoor High School, but was not able to play baseball because of poor grades.

Since Jenks was ineligible to play the remaining years of his high school career due to poor academic performance, he played in American Legion Baseball, where he attracted the attention of scouts.

== Professional career ==
=== Anaheim Angels ===
The Anaheim Angels selected Jenks in the fifth round, with the 140th overall selection, of the 2000 Major League Baseball draft. In one minor league game, the radar gun clocked his fastball at 100 miles per hour (160 km/h). During his time with the Angels organization, Jenks spent much of his time on the disabled list because of the stress that his hard throwing put on his elbow. He also had issues with alcohol and conditioning. He had surgery in 2004 to repair a stress fracture. His career with the Angels ended when he was designated for assignment by the team that December.

=== Chicago White Sox ===
On December 17, 2004, Jenks was claimed off of waivers by the Chicago White Sox for $20,000. He was sent to the club's Double-A affiliate, the Birmingham Barons to begin the 2005 season, posting a 1–2 record with 19 saves and a 2.85 ERA in 35 appearances. Jenks was called up to the major leagues by the White Sox on July 5, 2005. The next day, on his first pitch in Chicago, he threw the ball over the plate at 102 miles per hour (164 km/h). The White Sox made it to the 2005 World Series, and Jenks pitched in each of the series' four games. The White Sox won the series in four straight games over the Houston Astros, and Jenks pitched a total of five innings and made the series' final pitch. He recorded saves in Games 1 and 4, had a blown save in Game 2, and pitched scoreless 11th and 12th innings in the 14-inning Game 3.

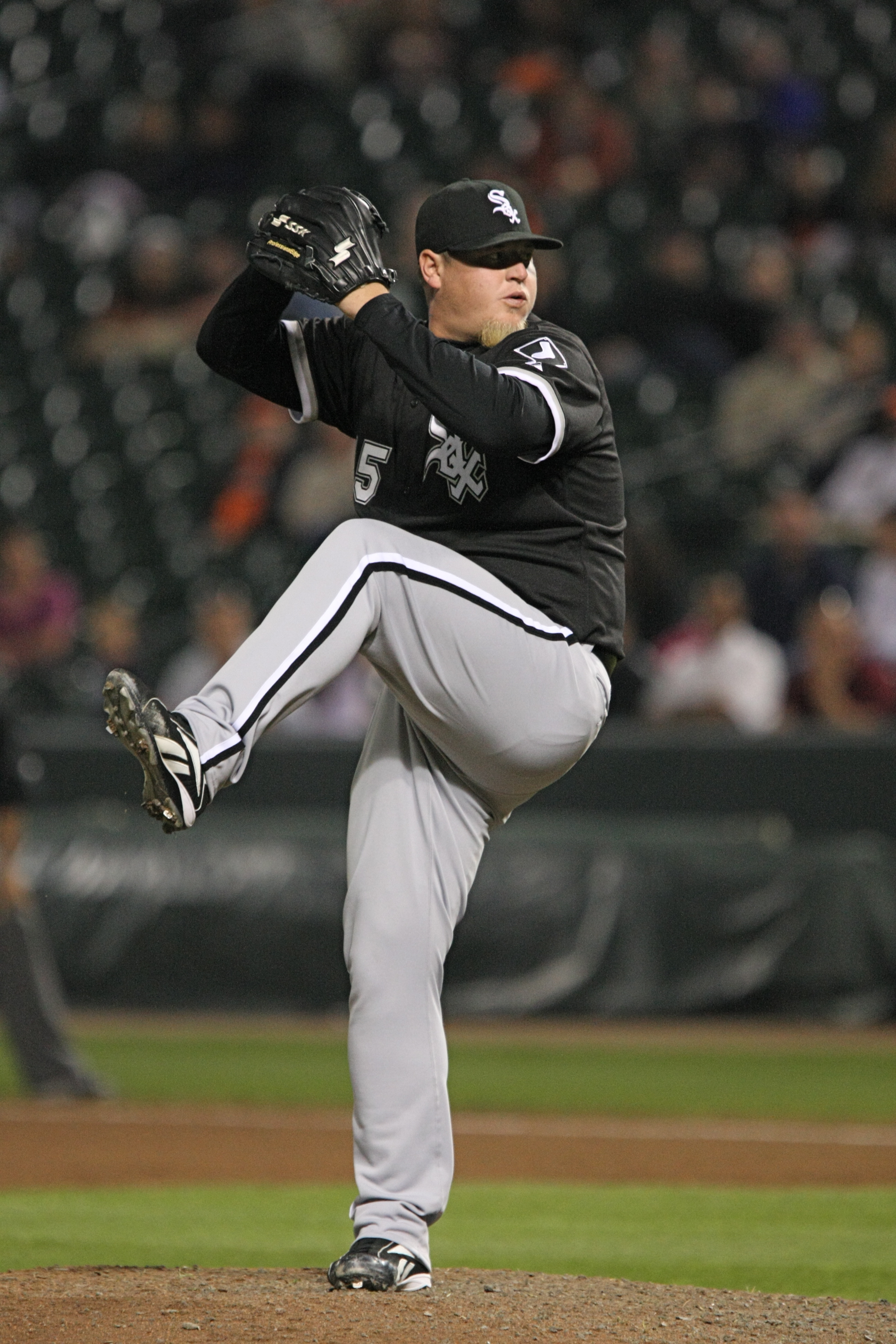
Jenks pitching for the Chicago White Sox in 2008.

In 2006, Jenks was selected to the American League All-Star team, and finished the season 3–4 with a 4.00 ERA while converting 41 out of 45 save opportunities in 67 relief appearances. Jenks was again selected to the American League All-Star team in 2007. On September 25, 2007, Jenks was named as one of 10 finalists for the "DHL Presents the Major League Baseball Delivery Man of the Year Award".

In 2007, Jenks pursued a record streak of retiring consecutive batters. On August 10, 2007, Jenks retired his 38th consecutive hitter, Ichiro Suzuki of the Seattle Mariners, to tie the American League record for most consecutive batters retired in a row, set by David Wells between May 12, 1998, and May 23, 1998, then with the New York Yankees. On August 12, 2007, in a game against the Seattle Mariners, Jenks retired his 41st consecutive batter, the Mariners' Yuniesky Betancourt, tying the Major League record held by San Francisco Giants pitcher Jim Barr, set over two games on August 23, 1972, and August 29, 1972. On August 20, 2007, Jenks allowed a base hit by Kansas City Royals outfielder Joey Gathright, ending his streak of 41 consecutive batters retired. However, Jenks was still able to get a save during the game. Jenks's record is unique in that the previous record holders were starting pitchers. Wells' achievement bookended a perfect game that he pitched on May 17, 1998, while Barr's mark was spread across two games, neither of which was a no-hitter. In contrast, Jenks was perfect for 14 appearances over 27 days (July 17 – August 12). Just two seasons later, his teammate Mark Buehrle broke the record for most consecutive batters retired on July 28, 2009, ending with 45 in a row.

On January 19, 2009, Jenks avoided arbitration and signed a one-year, $5.6 million contract with the White Sox. Jenks finished the season with 29 saves and 3.71 ERA. He avoided arbitration again in 2010, signing another one-year deal for $7.5 million. Jenks, however, had a rough season in 2010, seeing his ERA balloon to 4.44 while making 27 saves and pitching 52 2/3 innings with 61 strikeouts in 55 appearances and prompting manager Ozzie Guillen to remove him from the closer role for a period of time.

On December 2, 2010, the White Sox declined to tender him a contract and he became a free agent. He left ranked second in career saves amongst White Sox pitchers.

=== Boston Red Sox ===
On December 21, 2010, Jenks signed a two-year, $12 million contract with the Boston Red Sox. Jenks struggled for much of 2011 with injuries, going on the disabled list three times during the season. A bicep strain that had sent him to the injured list saw him try to gut it out for the rest of the season. A June game against the Yankees saw him get hurt when trying to throw a four-seam fastball that saw him describe the pain as "almost like a spoon had been shoved into my back." He stated that this is when he started taking pain medication, mostly with Percocet. Teammate Tim Wakefield suggested that Jenks get MRI images on his spine. The images revealed Jenks had bone spurs on his spine that were impacting on his nerves and calcifying tendons. He soon developed a blood clot that moved up to his lung. On September 13, 2011, the Red Sox announced that Jenks had been diagnosed with a pulmonary embolism; he soon came down with colitis as well. He pitched in 19 games during the 2011 season, going 2–2 with an ERA of 6.32.

==== Surgery complications ====
On December 12, 2011, Jenks had surgery to remove the bone spurs in his back. According to Jenks, he was supposed to have two levels of his spine decompressed. However, Dr. Kirkham Wood, head of the orthopedic bone unit at Massachusetts General Hospital (MGH), failed to complete the second level. Compounding the problem, when Wood closed Jenks up, he left a serrated edge in Jenks's back. Shortly after surgery, the edge sliced Jenks's back open in two places (specifically the membrane around his spinal cord in the dural sac). This caused him to leak spinal fluid and triggered an infection in his spine that went to his brain stem and nearly killed him. Jenks was forced to undergo emergency surgery on December 28, only two weeks after his first back procedure. The combined effect of the infection and his muscles being "torn open" left Jenks bedridden for three months. The Red Sox placed Jenks on the 60-day disabled list, and ruled him out for at least the first three months of the 2012 season.

On July 3, 2012, Jenks was released by the Red Sox. He sued Wood in 2015 for malpractice. During discovery, Jenks learned Wood was operating on a paralyzed man at the same time as his operation in what was called "concurrent surgery"; indeed, the other patient was already under anesthesia. Jenks told The Boston Globe that he would have had his bone spur surgery elsewhere had he known about the overlapping schedules. On May 8, 2019, Jenks reached a settlement with MGH and Wood for $5.1 million. Jenks argued that neither he nor the other patient received an acceptable level of care due to the concurrent surgeries. He believed Wood rushed his surgery to get to the paralyzed man, and left the serrated edge in his back because "(he) wasn’t as careful as he should have been."

Despite roughly a year of recovery, scanning of Jenks's spine found that it had been so weakened by the botched surgery and numerous salvage procedures that he would need a further procedure to place plates and screws in his back. While it was his best chance at a pain-free life, it would end any chance of him ever pitching again. The alternative would have been several rounds of physical therapy, and even then there would be no guarantee he would be in a condition to return to the mound. He elected to take the surgery and retired from baseball.

== Coaching career ==
Beginning in May 2021, Jenks served as the pitching coach for the Grand Junction Rockies of the MLB Partner Pioneer League. Following the 2021 season, he was promoted to manager following the retirement of the team's previous manager, Jimmy Johnson. He received the Manager of the Year award in 2022 after leading the Rockies to a championship. After spending the 2023 campaign as the pitching coach with the Princeton WhistlePigs, he was named manager of the Windy City ThunderBolts on October 26 of that year. He led the ThunderBolts to a 40–56 record in 2024 and was set to return in 2025, before announcing he would be taking a medical leave of absence on February 15, 2025.

== Personal life ==
Jenks was married twice, first to Adele Romkee, with whom he had four children, and later to Eleni Tzitzivacos until his death in 2025. Jenks and Tzitzivacos had two children together. As of May 2019, he lived in Malibu, California.

Jenks became addicted to painkillers shortly after his back injury and at one point was taking "probably up to 60+ pills a day. And, on some days that was probably on the low side." An attempt to detox for a week before going to spring training in 2012 led him to go back to ordering through a "pill mill" a day after detoxing. Jenks wrote about his experiences with addiction in 2019 for The Players' Tribune; he recounted mixing Percocet and Ambien when alone at his apartment in Fort Myers, Florida, for spring training, causing him to lay out the food from his refrigerator on the floor before stabbing his television with a knife. Between March and July 2012, he was arrested and charged twice for driving under the influence of painkillers. His family attempted an intervention in May, which saw him go for inpatient rehab. He eventually admitted to himself and others about being both an alcoholic and an addict; he also went through a divorce and depression after his 2013 surgery. As of 2019, he was seven years and three months sober while advocating for bans on concurrent surgeries like the procedure that all but ended his career.

Jenks moved to the Pacific Palisades region of Los Angeles, where his home burnt down in the 2025 Palisades Fire. Additionally, Jenks spent time in Portugal during the baseball offseasons, to be nearer to his second wife's family.

=== Illness and death ===
In February 2025, Jenks revealed that he had been diagnosed with stage IV gastric adenocarcinoma, a highly aggressive form of stomach cancer. He died from the illness on July 4, 2025, in Sintra, Portugal, at age 44.
