= Dave Sims =

American sportscaster (born 1953)

- Born: David Sims; February 14, 1953 (age 73); Philadelphia, Pennsylvania, U.S.
- Education: Bethany College (WV)
- Sports commentary career
- Genre: Play-by-play
- Sports: Major League Baseball; National Football League

David Sims (born February 14, 1953) is an American sportscaster. He is the radio play-by-play commentator for the New York Yankees of Major League Baseball (MLB). He was previously the television play-by play commentator for MLB's Seattle Mariners and a radio broadcaster of professional and college football and college basketball.

Sims was the 2018, 2019 and 2020 National Sports Media Association's Washington state Sportscaster of the Year.

== Early life ==
Sims grew up in Philadelphia, Pennsylvania, and lived a short walk from Connie Mack Stadium. His father was a sports fan and took him to see several sports legends, including Wilt Chamberlain, Jim Brown, and Willie Mays. Sims attended Chestnut Hill Academy, where he was co-captain of the baseball team his senior season. He then attended Bethany College in West Virginia. At Bethany, Sims played one year of Division III college football, finishing third in kickoff returns in the Presidents' Athletic Conference, and played catcher for the Bison baseball team. He majored in mass communications.

== Career ==
=== Early career ===
Sims began his career as an intern for the Philadelphia Inquirer, then becoming a sportswriter for the New York Daily News. In the early 1980s, he was a sports reporter for the short lived "Satellite News Channel". Moving to radio, Sims became the host of WNBC's SportsNight (1986–1988) (replacing Jack Spector), a five-hour nightly sports call-in show that was a precursor to the all-sports talk format of WFAN. He was hired by Michael Weisman as a reporter covering track and field for NBC Sports' telecast of the 1988 Summer Olympics. He went on to cohost the midday show with Ed Coleman on WFAN in New York from September 1989 to February 1993. He then became a weekend sports anchor at WCBS-TV in New York (1995–1998) and also was a radio host for the New York Knicks (1986–1993).

=== Play-By-Play ===
Sims' play-by-play announcing career began (1990–1992) as the radio voice of Temple Owls football. He credited Bill Cosby, a Temple alumnus and supporter, for getting him that job.

=== National work ===
Moving to TV, Sims was the TV voice of the Big East Conference football game of the week (1993–1994) and then again (1998–2007).

In 1991, Sims joined ESPN as a play-by-play announcer for college basketball and added college football in 1998. He primarily called Big East contests on the ESPN Plus regional network. He continued to broadcast college basketball games for FOX and FS1 beginning in 2016.

Sims was the #2 broadcaster for NFL on Westwood One Sports's Sunday afternoon doubleheader before taking the permanent play-by-play position on the Sunday Night Football radio broadcast. He replaced Joel Meyers on the Sunday Night Football game in 2006 and called games through the 2012 season. From 2013 to 2014, Sims returned to Sunday Afternoon NFL action while working with former NFL quarterback Mark Malone.

In addition to Sunday Night Football, Sims also called college basketball for Westwood One (1998–2015), with one of his most notable calls being the George Mason–UConn regional final in 2006, when #11 seed George Mason upset top-seed Connecticut to become the second #11 seed ever to reach the Final Four.

While working in other sports, Sims occasionally provided Major League Baseball play-by-play for ESPN (1993–1994) and did an internet radio show for MLB.com (1999–2000). In 2007, he returned to baseball full-time as part of the Seattle Mariners television broadcast. Sims is one of the few African-American broadcasters in the history of the sport. He became the team's primary TV broadcaster following the death of the legendary Dave Niehaus in 2010. His broadcast partner was former Mariners third baseman Mike Blowers. Sims and Blowers did not travel with the team to Japan at the start of the 2012 season, calling the games from a studio near Seattle.

In 2009, Sims was the television play-by-play commentator for the UFL on Versus.

Sims was the broadcaster on Fox on April 21, 2012 calling Philip Humber's perfect game for the Chicago White Sox against the Mariners. However, the game was broadcast in its entirety only in the Chicago and Seattle markets, because Fox broadcast a Boston Red Sox and New York Yankees game in the rest of the country.

Just four months after calling Humber's perfect game, Félix Hernández threw the first perfect game in Mariners' history. Sims called the game for Root Sports Northwest. This is the first time that one broadcaster has called two perfect games in the same MLB season.

Sims became the play-by-play broadcaster for the Swingman Classic, held before the MLB All-Star Game, starting in 2023.

Sims is the former co-host of Basketball and Beyond with Coach K with Mike Krzyzewski on SiriusXM. They met in the late 1970s, when Krzyzewski coached the Army basketball team. Krzyzewski later recommended Sims for the Mariners' job.

=== New York Yankees (2025-present) ===
In November 2024, WFAN hired Sims to be the radio play-by-play announcer for the New York Yankees, succeeding John Sterling. He signed a two-year contract through the 2026 season.

Paired with Suzyn Waldman, Sims called Austin Wells' leadoff home run on Opening Day, March 29, 2025.

Sims was nominated for the 2025 Ford C. Frick Award.

== Broadcasting style ==
Sims is noted for using the following catchphrases on baseball broadcasts:

- "Giddy up! Baby! Giddy up!"- used on exciting plays and also used on balls that may go over the fence for a home run.
- ”Hey Now!”- used after exciting, game changing plays.
- "Bye-Bye!" - home run.
- "Boomstick Baby!"- used whenever Nelson Cruz hit a home run.
- "Holy Mackerel"/"How about that?"- used for exciting plays.
- ”Bro-uh-uh-uh-uh-uh-ther.” - used after a particularly dispiriting loss or play.
- ”Got him!” - used after a pitcher strikes out an opposing batter.

Sims is a dedicated believer in letting his audience know when a pitcher is working on a no-hitter instead of following the old superstition of not mentioning it, or at least not uttering the term "no-hitter". "I have to tell the audience what’s going on…if a guy’s throwing a no-no, I have to report it."

== Personal life ==
Sims has been supportive of fellow African-American play-by-play broadcasters Robert Ford and Everett Fitzhugh. Sims has been a guest lecturer at Ryan Ruocco's broadcasting classes at Fordham University.

Sims had surgery to remove his prostate in January 2016. He ruptured his Achilles tendon in April 2018 during a basketball game with Rick Rizzs.

Sims is known for wearing a hat in the broadcast booth. He began wearing hats after San Diego Padres broadcaster Mark Grant introduced him to a hat store in Southern California. The Mariners held promotions related to Sims' hats, later in his tenure, would film Sims broadcasting and post clips on social media. Sims briefly sold hats online.

Sims is married and has two children and a grandchild. He has hosted a podcast "Hey Now," with his sons. He lives in New York City during the offseason.
