= 2012 Major League Baseball season =

2012 MLB season
- League: Major League Baseball
- Sport: Baseball
- Duration: March 28 – October 28, 2012
- Games: 162
- Teams: 30
- TV partner(s): Fox; TBS; ESPN; MLB Network

Draft
- Top draft pick: Carlos Correa
- Picked by: Houston Astros

Regular season
- Season MVP: AL: Miguel Cabrera (DET); NL: Buster Posey (SF)

Postseason
- AL champions: Detroit Tigers
- AL runners-up: New York Yankees
- NL champions: San Francisco Giants
- NL runners-up: St. Louis Cardinals

World Series
- Champions: San Francisco Giants
- Runners-up: Detroit Tigers
- World Series MVP: Pablo Sandoval (SF)

MLB seasons
- ← 2011 2013 →

Locations of AL teams for the 2010–2012 MLB seasons
West Central East
Locations of NL teams for the 2012 MLB season
West Central East

The 2012 Major League Baseball season began on April 5, 2012 because during the MLB Spring Training it was the first of a two-game series between the Seattle Mariners and the Oakland Athletics at the Tokyo Dome in Japan. On November 22, 2011, a new contract between Major League Baseball and its players union was ratified, and as a result, an expanded playoff format adding two clubs would be adopted no later than 2013 according to the new Collective Bargaining Agreement. The new format of the 2012 postseason used the 1 game series of the Wild Card round of the format for the 2012 postseason only. The restriction against divisional rivals playing against each other in the Division Series round that had existed in previous years was eliminated, as the Baltimore Orioles and New York Yankees squared off in one of the best-of-five LDS in the American League. On April 4, 2012, it was the last day of the MLB Spring Training and ended with the new Marlins Park, as the newly renamed Miami Marlins hosted the defending World Series champion St. Louis Cardinals. The regular season ended on Wednesday, October 3, 2012. The entire master schedule was released on September 14, 2011.

The Major League Baseball postseason was expanded to include a second wild card team in each league beginning in the 2012 season. The season marked the last for the Houston Astros as a member of the National League. Following the sale to new owner Jim Crane, the Astros agreed to move to the American League effective in the 2013 season, and would be assigned to the American League West, joining their in-state rivals, the Texas Rangers.

The Major League Baseball All-Star Game's 83rd edition was held on July 10, 2012 at Kauffman Stadium in Kansas City, Missouri, with the National League winning the All-Star Game for the third consecutive year in an 8–0 shutout of the American League. With the win, the National League champion earned home field advantage for the World Series, which began on October 24, 2012 and ended on October 28, 2012 when the San Francisco Giants swept the Detroit Tigers. The Civil Rights Game was held on August 18, 2012 at Turner Field, as the Los Angeles Dodgers beat the host Atlanta Braves, 6–2.

== Standings ==
=== American League ===
AL East
Team	W	L	Pct.	GB	Home	Road
^{(1)} New York Yankees	95	67	.586	—	51‍–‍30	44‍–‍37
^{(5)} Baltimore Orioles	93	69	.574	2	47‍–‍34	46‍–‍35
Tampa Bay Rays	90	72	.556	5	46‍–‍35	44‍–‍37
Toronto Blue Jays	73	89	.451	22	41‍–‍40	32‍–‍49
Boston Red Sox	69	93	.426	26	34‍–‍47	35‍–‍46

AL Central
Team	W	L	Pct.	GB	Home	Road
^{(3)} Detroit Tigers	88	74	.543	—	50‍–‍31	38‍–‍43
Chicago White Sox	85	77	.525	3	45‍–‍36	40‍–‍41
Kansas City Royals	72	90	.444	16	37‍–‍44	35‍–‍46
Cleveland Indians	68	94	.420	20	37‍–‍44	31‍–‍50
Minnesota Twins	66	96	.407	22	31‍–‍50	35‍–‍46

AL West
Team	W	L	Pct.	GB	Home	Road
^{(2)} Oakland Athletics	94	68	.580	—	50‍–‍31	44‍–‍37
^{(4)} Texas Rangers	93	69	.574	1	50‍–‍31	43‍–‍38
Los Angeles Angels	89	73	.549	5	46‍–‍35	43‍–‍38
Seattle Mariners	75	87	.463	19	40‍–‍41	35‍–‍46

=== National League ===
NL East
Team	W	L	Pct.	GB	Home	Road
^{(1)} Washington Nationals	98	64	.605	—	50‍–‍31	48‍–‍33
^{(4)} Atlanta Braves	94	68	.580	4	48‍–‍33	46‍–‍35
Philadelphia Phillies	81	81	.500	17	40‍–‍41	41‍–‍40
New York Mets	74	88	.457	24	36‍–‍45	38‍–‍43
Miami Marlins	69	93	.426	29	38‍–‍43	31‍–‍50

NL Central
Team	W	L	Pct.	GB	Home	Road
^{(2)} Cincinnati Reds	97	65	.599	—	50‍–‍31	47‍–‍34
^{(5)} St. Louis Cardinals	88	74	.543	9	50‍–‍31	38‍–‍43
Milwaukee Brewers	83	79	.512	14	49‍–‍32	34‍–‍47
Pittsburgh Pirates	79	83	.488	18	45‍–‍36	34‍–‍47
Chicago Cubs	61	101	.377	36	38‍–‍43	23‍–‍58
Houston Astros	55	107	.340	42	35‍–‍46	20‍–‍61

NL West
Team	W	L	Pct.	GB	Home	Road
^{(3)} San Francisco Giants	94	68	.580	—	48‍–‍33	46‍–‍35
Los Angeles Dodgers	86	76	.531	8	45‍–‍36	41‍–‍40
Arizona Diamondbacks	81	81	.500	13	41‍–‍40	40‍–‍41
San Diego Padres	76	86	.469	18	42‍–‍39	34‍–‍47
Colorado Rockies	64	98	.395	30	35‍–‍46	29‍–‍52

== Postseason ==
=== Bracket ===
Wild Card Game (ALWC, NLWC)
4	Texas	0
5	Baltimore	1
4	Atlanta	0
5	St. Louis	1

Division Series (ALDS, NLDS)
1	NY Yankees	3
5	Baltimore	2
American League
2	Oakland	2
3	Detroit	3
1	Washington	2
5	St. Louis	3
National League
2	Cincinnati	2
3	San Francisco	3

League Championship Series (ALCS, NLCS)
1	NY Yankees	0
3	Detroit	4
5	St. Louis	3
3	San Francisco	4

World Series
AL3	Detroit	0
NL3	San Francisco	4

== Managerial changes ==
=== General managers ===
==== Off-season ====
Team	Former GM	New GM	Former job
Boston Red Sox	Theo Epstein	Ben Cherington	Cherington previously served as the Assistant General Manager of the Red Sox.
Chicago Cubs	Randy Bush	Jed Hoyer	Hoyer previously served as the general manager of the San Diego Padres.
San Diego Padres	Jed Hoyer	Josh Byrnes	Byrnes previously served in the Vice President of Baseball Operations for the Padres.
Los Angeles Angels of Anaheim	Tony Reagins	Jerry DiPoto	DiPoto previously served in several scouting departments, most recently with the Arizona Diamondbacks.
Minnesota Twins	Bill Smith	Terry Ryan (interim)	Ryan previously served as General Manager of the Twins from 1994–2007.
Baltimore Orioles	Andy MacPhail	Dan Duquette	Duquette previously served as general manager of the Montreal Expos from 1991–1995 and Boston Red Sox from 1995–2002.
Houston Astros	Ed Wade	Jeff Luhnow	Luhnow had previously been employed by the St. Louis Cardinals.

=== Field managers ===
==== Off-season ====
The following managers were hired for the 2012 season after the former manager retired from baseball.

Team	Former manager	New manager	Story
Miami Marlins	Jack McKeon	Ozzie Guillén	On September 28, 2011, the Marlins announced that Ozzie Guillén has signed a four-year contract to manage the team beginning in the 2012 season. He replaces Jack McKeon, who served as interim manager since June 2011. Two minor league prospects were sent to the Chicago White Sox in exchange for Guillén's rights.
St. Louis Cardinals	Tony La Russa	Mike Matheny	On October 31, 2011, just three days after winning the 2011 World Series, Tony La Russa announced his retirement. The Cardinals announced the hiring of former catcher Mike Matheny as its new manager on November 13, 2011. Matheny, who had no previous managerial experience, played in 13 Major League seasons from 1994 to 2006, and was a four-time Gold Glove Award winner.

At the end of the 2011 season, the following teams made replacements to their managers.

Team	Former manager	New manager	Story
Boston Red Sox	Terry Francona	Bobby Valentine	On September 30, 2011, the Red Sox decided not to exercise their 2012 option on Terry Francona's contract and both parties decided to part ways. Francona led the team to two World Series championships in 2004, which ended the Curse of the Bambino, and 2007. However, in 2011, the Red Sox went 7–20 in the month of September, blowing a 9-game wild card lead as they were eliminated from playoff contention. Valentine, whose previous managerial jobs were with the Texas Rangers from 1985–92 and the New York Mets from 1996 to 2002, was an analyst for Sunday Night Baseball on ESPN at the time of his hiring. Ironically, on December 6, 2011, it was announced that Francona would take over for Valentine on SNB in 2012, after working as a color commentator for the first two games of the 2011 ALCS on Fox.
Chicago Cubs	Mike Quade	Dale Sveum	The Cubs hired Dale Sveum as their new manager on November 17, 2011, replacing Mike Quade. Sveum had been a coach for the Milwaukee Brewers at various capacities (bench, third base, hitting) since 2006, and was also a former third base coach of the Boston Red Sox from 2004–05. His previous managerial experience was as an interim manager for the Brewers late in 2008, guiding the Brewers to a wild card berth that year. Quade served as manager of the Cubs from August 2010 until September 2011, succeeding Lou Piniella; however his only full season saw the Cubs finish 71–91 and in fifth place in the NL Central.
Chicago White Sox	Ozzie Guillén/Don Cooper	Robin Ventura	On October 6, 2011, the White Sox named Robin Ventura as their new manager. Ventura, a former two-time All-Star third baseman, played for the White Sox from 1989 till 1998. Cooper served as the White Sox' interim manager for the last two days of the season, after Ozzie Guillén was hired as the Miami Marlins' new manager.

==== In-season changes ====
Date	Team	Former manager	Reason	Replacement	Previous Job and Story
August 18	Houston Astros	Brad Mills	Fired	Tony DeFrancesco (interim)	At the time of promotion, DeFrancesco was serving as manager of the Astros' AAA Pacific Coast League affiliate Oklahoma City RedHawks. Mills was fired after two-plus seasons at the helm, which included a franchise-record 106 losses in 2011. Hitting coach Mike Barnett and first base coach Bobby Meacham were also fired.
September 27	Cleveland Indians	Manny Acta	Fired	Sandy Alomar Jr. (interim)	Alomar was serving as Acta's bench coach when Acta was fired.

== League leaders ==
=== American League ===
Hitting leaders
Stat	Player	Total
AVG	Miguel Cabrera^{1} (DET)	.330
OPS	Miguel Cabrera (DET)	.999
HR	Miguel Cabrera^{1} (DET)	44
RBI	Miguel Cabrera^{1} (DET)	139
R	Mike Trout (LAA)	129
H	Derek Jeter (NYY)	216
SB	Mike Trout (LAA)	49

^{1} American League Triple Crown batting winner

Pitching leaders
Stat	Player	Total
W	David Price (TB); Jered Weaver (LAA)	20
L	Ubaldo Jiménez (CLE)	17
ERA	David Price (TB)	2.56
K	Justin Verlander (DET)	239
IP	Justin Verlander (DET)	238.1
SV	Jim Johnson (BAL)	51
WHIP	Jered Weaver (LAA)	1.018

=== National League ===
Hitting leaders
Stat	Player	Total
AVG	Buster Posey (SF)	.336**
OPS	Ryan Braun (MIL)	.987
HR	Ryan Braun (MIL)	41
RBI	Chase Headley (SD)	115
R	Ryan Braun (MIL)	108
H	Andrew McCutchen (PIT)	194
SB	Everth Cabrera (SD)	44

Pitching leaders
Stat	Player	Total
W	Gio González (WSH)	21
L	Tim Lincecum (SF)	15
ERA	Clayton Kershaw (LAD)	2.53
K	R. A. Dickey (NYM)	230
IP	R. A. Dickey (NYM)	233.2
SV	Craig Kimbrel (ATL); Jason Motte (STL)	42
WHIP	Clayton Kershaw (LAD)	1.023

** Melky Cabrera of the San Francisco Giants was ineligible to win the batting title, at his request, due to being suspended for testing positive for testosterone. He finished the season with a .346 average.

== Milestones ==
=== Reached ===
==== Batters ====
- Adam Dunn (CWS):
  - Tied the Major League record for most opening-day home runs by hitting his eighth against the Texas Rangers on April 6. He tied the record held by Frank Robinson and Ken Griffey Jr.
  - Set the Major League record to strikeout at least once in each of his team's first 15 games of a season, by striking out in the first inning against the Seattle Mariners on April 22. He broke the record that was held by Howie Goss, who struck out in each of Houston's first 14 games in 1963. Dunn continued to 32 games before not striking out May 11 against the Kansas City Royals.
  - Recorded his 1000th career RBI in the ninth inning on August 13 against the Toronto Blue Jays. He became the 273rd player to reach this mark.
  - Hit his 400th career home run against the Kansas City Royals on August 18. He became the 50th player to reach this mark.
- José Reyes (MIA):
  - Recorded his 100th career triple in the ninth inning against the Cincinnati Reds on April 8. He became the 162nd player to reach this mark.
- Alex Rodriguez (NYY):
  - Tied Ken Griffey Jr. for fifth place on the career home run list with his 630th home run on April 13. Then one week later on April 20, Rodriguez hit his 631st home run to pass Griffey for fifth place on the career home run list.
  - Tied Lou Gehrig for most career grand slams with his 23rd against the Atlanta Braves on June 12.
- Adrián Beltré (TEX):
  - Scored his 1000th career run in the ninth inning against the Minnesota Twins on April 14. He became the 314th player to reach this mark.
- Todd Helton (COL):
  - Recorded his 350th career home run in the ninth inning against the Milwaukee Brewers on April 21. He became the 85th player to reach this mark.
- Rafael Furcal (STL):
  - Scored his 1000th career run in the eighth inning against the Chicago Cubs on April 24. He became the 315th player to reach this mark.
- Paul Konerko (CWS):
  - Hit his 400th career home run against the Oakland Athletics on April 25. He became the 48th player to reach this mark.
- Miguel Cabrera (DET):
  - Collected his 1000th RBI against the New York Yankees on April 27. He became the 272nd person to reach that mark.
  - Hit his 300th career home run on July 22 against the Chicago White Sox.
  - Became the first player to win the batting "Triple Crown" since Carl Yaztremski in 1967.
- Torii Hunter (LAA):
  - Scored his 1000th career run in the fourth inning against the Minnesota Twins on May 2. He became the 316th player to reach this mark.
- Josh Hamilton (TEX):
  - Hit four home runs in a game against the Baltimore Orioles on May 8. He became the 16th player in Major League history to accomplish this feat.
  - Became the first player in Rangers' franchise history to exceed 20 home runs by the end of May.
- Plácido Polanco (PHI):
  - Recorded his 2000th career hit with a two-run home run in the eighth inning against the Houston Astros on May 14. He became the 269th player to reach this mark.
- Jamie Moyer (COL):
  - With his two-run single against the Arizona Diamondbacks on May 16, Moyer (at age 49 years, 180 days) became the oldest player in Major League history to record an RBI.
- Albert Pujols (LAA):
  - Hit his 450th career home run against the Seattle Mariners on May 24, becoming the 35th player and fourth-youngest to reach this mark.
- Melky Cabrera (SF):
  - Set the Giants' franchise record for most hits in May with his 50th hit on May 29 against the Arizona Diamondbacks. He broke the record that was set by Willie Mays. On May 30, Cabrera singled in the eighth inning and tied the franchise record for most hits in any month with 51 that was set by Randy Winn in September 2005.
- Steve Lombardozzi Jr./Bryce Harper (WSH):
  - Became the first pair of rookies in Major League history to hit back-to-back home runs beginning with a first-inning leadoff shot on June 3 against the Atlanta Braves.
- Carlos Beltrán (STL):
  - Became the first switch hitter in Major League history with 300 home runs and 300 steals with his stolen base on June 15 against the Kansas City Royals.
- Ichiro Suzuki (NYY)/(SEA):
  - Recorded his 2500th MLB career hit in the first inning against the Arizona Diamondbacks on June 19. He became the 95th player to reach this mark.
- Jim Thome (BAL)/(PHI):
  - Hit his 13th career walk-off home run of his Major League career against the Tampa Bay Rays on June 23. The home run set a Major League record for most career walk-off home runs, breaking the record he shared with Babe Ruth, Jimmie Foxx, Stan Musial, Mickey Mantle and Frank Robinson.
- José Bautista (TOR):
  - With his home run against the Boston Red Sox on June 27, Bautista set the Jays' franchise record for most home runs in a calendar month with 13. He broke the record that he shared with Carlos Delgado (August 1999), José Cruz Jr. (August 2001) and himself from May and August 2010. Bautista finished the month with 14 home runs.
- Aaron Hill (AZ):
  - Hit for the cycle on June 18 against the Seattle Mariners and on June 29 against the Milwaukee Brewers. Hill became the fourth player to hit for the cycle twice in the same season, and the first to do so in a calendar month since John Reilly in 1883.
- Yasmani Grandal (SD):
  - Became the first player in Major League history to hit a home run from each side of the plate for his first two Major League hits.
- David Ortiz (BOS):
  - Hit his 400th career home run in the fourth inning against the Oakland Athletics on July 4. He became the 49th player to reach this mark.
- Derek Jeter (NYY):
  - With two hits on August 11 against the Toronto Blue Jays, Jeter increased his season total to 150 and joined Hank Aaron as the only players in Major League history to post 150 or more hits in each of 17 consecutive seasons.
- David Wright (NYM):
  - Hit his 200th career home run on August 24 against the Houston Astros, becoming only the third player in Mets history do accomplish this feat.
  - Set the franchise record for most hits in team history on September 26 with 1,420. He broke the record that was held by Ed Kranepool.
- Mike Trout (LAA)
  - With his 25th home run on August 28 against the Boston Red Sox, Trout became the youngest player in Major League history and first rookie to amass 25 home runs and 40 stolen bases in a single season.
  - Became the first rookie in Major League history to amass at least 30 home runs and 40 stolen bases in a season. At age 21, he also became the youngest player in Major League history with a 30–30 season.
  - Became the first player in Major League history to hit 30 homers, steal 45 bases and score 125 runs in one season.
- Bryce Harper (WSH):
  - Became the third teenager in Major League history to record at least two multi-homer games in a single season with this two home runs against the Chicago Cubs on September 5. The other teenagers that accomplished this feat were Mel Ott (1928) and Ken Griffey Jr. (1989).
- Ryan Braun (MIL):
  - With his 200th career home run on September 16 against the New York Mets, Braun reached the combination of 200 home runs and 100 stolen bases faster than anyone else in Major League history (five years, 114 days after his major-league debut).
- Ryan Howard (PHI):
  - With his 300th home run against the Atlanta Braves on September 22, Howard (also the 135th player to reach this mark) reached the 300-homer plateau in his 1093rd game, which is the second-fewest games that any player in Major League history has needed to get to that milestone. Ralph Kiner needed 1087 games to hit 300 home runs.

==== Pitchers ====
===== Perfect games =====
- Philip Humber (CWS):
  - Threw the 21st perfect game in Major League history, defeating the Seattle Mariners 4–0 on April 21. This was the third perfect game in the White Sox's history, the last being Mark Buehrle's perfect game on July 23, 2009.
- Matt Cain (SF):
  - Threw the 22nd perfect game in Major League history, defeating the Houston Astros 10–0 on June 13. This was the first perfect game in the Giants' history. Cain tied Sandy Koufax's strikeout record in a perfect game with 14.
- Félix Hernández (SEA):
  - Threw the 23rd perfect game in Major League history, defeating the Tampa Bay Rays 1–0 on August 15. This was the first perfect game in the Mariners' history, and the franchise's fourth no-hitter. It also marked the first time in Major League history three perfect games were thrown in one season. Safeco Field became the first Major League ballpark to host two perfect games in the same season. This would be the last perfect game in the major leagues until 2023.

===== No-hitters =====
- Jered Weaver (LAA):
  - Threw the 10th no-hitter in Angels history by defeating the Minnesota Twins 9–0 on May 2. This was Weaver's first career no-hitter. Weaver allowed a passed ball on Chris Parmelee and a walk on Josh Willingham while striking out nine.
- Johan Santana (NYM):
  - Threw the first no-hitter in Mets history by defeating the St. Louis Cardinals 8–0 on June 1. This was Santana's first career no-hitter. He walked five batters while striking out eight. With the Mets' first no-hitter (in their 8,020th game) This was also the first no-hitter to be thrown against a defending World Series champion since the Oakland Athletics in their 1990 pennant season.
- Kevin Millwood/Charlie Furbush/Stephen Pryor/Lucas Luetge/Brandon League/Tom Wilhelmsen (SEA):
  - Threw the third no-hitter in Mariners history by defeating the Los Angeles Dodgers 1–0 on June 8. Each pitcher earned their first career no-hitter except for Millwood, who pitched his second. The Mariners pitching staff combined for three walks and nine strikeouts. The combined no-hitter was the first since the Houston Astros used six pitchers against the New York Yankees in 2003, also in interleague play. The Mariners tied the all-time league record of the former for the most pitchers used in a no-hitter, while recording a new American League record previously set by Oakland in 1975 and Baltimore in 1991.
- Homer Bailey (CIN):
  - Threw the 15th no-hitter in Reds history by defeating the Pittsburgh Pirates 1–0 on September 28. This was Bailey's first career no-hitter. Only two men reached base, Clint Barmes on a fielding error by Scott Rolen in the third and a walk by Andrew McCutchen in the seventh. Todd Frazier's sacrifice fly, scoring Brandon Phillips in the first was the lone run of the game. Bailey struck out ten during his 115 pitch effort. Bailey's effort tied the modern era record for most no-hitters in a season, matching only the 1990 and 1991 seasons with seven no-hitters.

===== Other accomplishments =====
- Edwin Jackson (WSH):
  - Became the first pitcher since 1900 to record a win as a starter for seven different teams before turning 29 years old by defeating the Cincinnati Reds on April 14.
- Jamie Moyer (COL):
  - With his victory against the San Diego Padres on April 17, Moyer became the oldest pitcher (49 years, 151 days) in Major League history to win a game. He broke the record that was held by Jack Quinn (49 years, 70 days) who set the record on September 13, 1932, for the Brooklyn Dodgers.
- R. A. Dickey (NYM):
  - Set the Mets' franchise record for most consecutive scoreless innings at 32 2/3 breaking the record that was held by Jerry Koosman. Koosman set the record at 31 2/3 innings in 1973. He finished with 44 2/3 innings without allowing an earned run when Mark Teixeira's sacrifice fly ended the streak on June 24 against the New York Yankees.
  - Became the first pitcher in modern Major League history (since 1900) to throw back-to-back complete games while striking out 10-or-more batters and allowing either one hit or no hits in each game.
- Steve Delabar (TOR):
  - Became the first pitcher in Major League history to record four strikeouts in an extra inning in one game on August 13 against the Chicago White Sox.
- Milwaukee Brewers:
  - Became the first pitching staff in Major League history to record 10 or more strikeouts in seven straight games in modern-day (since 1900) history. They broke the record (six games) that was previously held by the 1990 New York Mets, the 2006 Chicago Cubs and 2008 Cubs.
- Félix Hernández (SEA):
  - With his 1–0 shutout on August 27 against the Minnesota Twins, this was his third 1–0 shutout for the month, tying the Major League record for most 1–0 shutouts in a calendar month. He tied the record that is held by Carl Hubbell (July 1933) and Dick Rudolph (August 1916).
- Zack Greinke (LAA):
  - Became the first pitcher since 1900 to strike out 13-or-more batters while pitching five-or-fewer innings in a game on September 25 against the Seattle Mariners.
- Zack Greinke/Garrett Richards/Scott Downs/Kevin Jepsen/Ernesto Frieri (LAA):
  - Became the fourth team to achieve 20 strike outs in a nine inning game on September 25 against the Seattle Mariners. They are the first to do it with multiple pitchers, as it was previously done twice by Roger Clemens and once by Kerry Wood.
- Doug Fister (DET):
  - Set an American League record by striking out nine consecutive batters in his start against the Kansas City Royals on September 27. The previous record of eight was previously done on multiple occasions (by Nolan Ryan twice, Ron Davis, Roger Clemens, and Blake Stein).
- David Price (TB):
  - With his victory on September 30 against the Chicago White Sox, Price became the first 20-game winner in franchise history. He finished the season with a 20–5 record.
- Kris Medlen (ATL):
  - With the Braves victory on September 30 against the New York Mets, the Braves won for a Major League record 23rd straight time in games started by Medlen. This broke the record that was held by Whitey Ford and Carl Hubbell.
- Fernando Rodney (TB):
  - Set the Major League record for the lowest ERA with at least 50 appearances at 0.60. Rodney broke the record of 0.61 that was set by Dennis Eckersley in 1990.

=== Miscellaneous ===
- Toronto Blue Jays/Cleveland Indians:
  - Played the longest opening-day game ever in the major leagues on April 5. The game lasted 16 innings and the Blue Jays won 7–4. The game eclipsed the previous longest openers between Cleveland and Detroit on April 19, 1960 (15 innings), and between Philadelphia and Washington on April 13, 1926 (15 innings).
- Cincinnati Reds:
  - Became the sixth franchise to reach 10,000 wins in Major League history with a 9–4 win against the Chicago Cubs on April 20. The Reds amassed a record of 10,000–9,710.
- Kansas City Royals:
  - With their loss to the Toronto Blue Jays on April 23, the Royals lost all ten games on their homestand. Only two other teams in Major League history went 0–10 or worse on a homestand: the Seattle Pilots went 0–10 on a homestand in August 1969, and the Arizona Diamondbacks went 0–11 on a homestand in July 2004.
- Baltimore Orioles:
  - Became the first team in American League history to start a game with three consecutive home runs by doing this against the Texas Rangers on May 10 in the first game of the doubleheader. Ryan Flaherty, J. J. Hardy and Nick Markakis hit the record setting home runs against Colby Lewis.
  - With their victory on September 13 against the Tampa Bay Rays, the Orioles won their 81st game of the season which officially ended a franchise-record run of 14 consecutive losing seasons.
  - Chris Davis became the first position player to be credited with a win since Rocky Colavito pitched in 1968. The May 6 game was also notable in that both teams used a position player to pitch in relief, the first time since 1925.
- Los Angeles Dodgers:
  - By being shutout in the three-game series against the San Francisco Giants June 25 through June 27, this marked the first time in franchise history that the Dodgers failed to score in a series of three or more games.
- New York Yankees:
  - Set a franchise record by scoring at least three runs in their 39th consecutive game on July 15 against the Los Angeles Angels. This broke a team record set in 1933. Only two other Major League teams have scored three runs or more in each of at least 39 straight games in one season: the 1994 Indians (48 games) and 1930 Athletics (41). The streak ended at 43 games after a 3–2 loss to the Oakland Athletics on July 20.
- St. Louis Cardinals:
  - Tied a Major League record seven doubles in one inning in the seventh inning against the Chicago Cubs on July 21. They tied the mark set by the Boston Bees in 1936. The 12 runs they scored in the inning also tied a franchise record set by the 1926 Cardinals.
- Washington Nationals:
  - Became the third team in Major League history to hit at least six home runs in consecutive games on September 4 and 5 against the Chicago Cubs, joining the 2003 Los Angeles Angels and the 1996 Los Angeles Dodgers.
- Chicago Cubs/Houston Astros:
  - On September 11, 2012, the Cubs and Astros combined to use 11 pitchers in a game in which Houston came away with a 1–0 victory at Minute Maid Park. It is the most pitchers used in a 1–0 nine-inning game in Major League history breaking the record of ten pitchers in games of that type: Colorado vs. San Diego on September 17, 2008, San Francisco vs. San Diego on September 10, 2010, and the Pittsburgh vs. Houston on June 14, 2011.
- Oakland Athletics:
  - Set the American League record for most team strikeouts in a season by passing the record of 1,324 strikeouts that the Tampa Bay Rays set in 2007. Chris Carter was the victim as the Rangers right-handed pitcher Roy Oswalt struck out Carter in the third inning on September 26. The Major League record is 1,529 strikeouts and is currently held by the 2010 Arizona Diamondbacks.
  - Set the Major League record for wins by rookie pitchers with their 53rd win against the Texas Rangers on October 2.
- Pittsburgh Pirates:
  - With their loss to the Cincinnati Reds on September 30, the Pirates extended their record for most consecutive losing seasons to 20. Their last winning record was in 1992.
- Division Series:
  - This postseason marks the first time that all four division series went the full five games since the divisional round and wild cards were introduced in 1995.

== Awards and honors ==
=== Regular season ===
Baseball Writers' Association of America Awards
BBWAA Award	National League	American League
Rookie of the Year	Bryce Harper (WSH)	Mike Trout (LAA)
Cy Young Award	R. A. Dickey (NYM)	David Price (TB)
Manager of the Year	Davey Johnson (WSH)	Bob Melvin (OAK)
Most Valuable Player	Buster Posey (SF)	Miguel Cabrera (DET)
Gold Glove Awards
Position	National League	American League
Pitcher	Mark Buehrle (MIA)	Jeremy Hellickson (TB); Jake Peavy (CWS)
Catcher	Yadier Molina (STL)	Matt Wieters (BAL)
1st Base	Adam LaRoche (WSH)	Mark Teixeira (NYY)
2nd Base	Darwin Barney (CHC)	Robinson Canó (NYY)
3rd Base	Chase Headley (SD)	Adrián Beltré (TEX)
Shortstop	Jimmy Rollins (PHI)	J. J. Hardy (BAL)
Left field	Carlos González (COL)	Alex Gordon (KC)
Center field	Andrew McCutchen (PIT)	Adam Jones (BAL)
Right field	Jason Heyward (ATL)	Josh Reddick (OAK)
Silver Slugger Awards
Pitcher/Designated Hitter	Stephen Strasburg (WSH)	Billy Butler (KC)
Catcher	Buster Posey (SF)	A. J. Pierzynski (CWS)
1st Base	Adam LaRoche (WSH)	Prince Fielder (DET)
2nd Base	Aaron Hill (AZ)	Robinson Canó (NYY)
3rd Base	Chase Headley (SD)	Miguel Cabrera (DET)
Shortstop	Ian Desmond (WSH)	Derek Jeter (NYY)
Outfield	Ryan Braun (MIL)	Josh Willingham (MIN)
Outfield	Jay Bruce (CIN)	Josh Hamilton (TEX)
Outfield	Andrew McCutchen (PIT)	Mike Trout (LAA)

=== Other awards ===
- The Sporting News Player of the Year Award: Miguel Cabrera
- Comeback Players of the Year: Fernando Rodney (TB, American); Buster Posey (SF, National)
- Edgar Martínez Award (Best designated hitter): Billy Butler (KC)
- Hank Aaron Award: Miguel Cabrera (DET, American); Buster Posey (SF, National)
- Roberto Clemente Award (Humanitarian): Clayton Kershaw (LAD)
- Delivery Man of the Year (Best reliever): Fernando Rodney (TB)
- Rolaids Relief Man Award (Best reliever) Jim Johnson (BAL, American), Craig Kimbrel (ATL, National)
- Warren Spahn Award (Best left-handed pitcher): Gio González (WSH)

Fielding Bible Awards
Position	Player
Pitcher	Mark Buehrle (MIA)
Catcher	Yadier Molina (STL)
1st Base	Mark Teixeira (NYY)
2nd Base	Darwin Barney (CHC)
3rd Base	Adrián Beltré (TEX)
Shortstop	Brendan Ryan (SEA)
Left Field	Alex Gordon (KC)
Center Field	Mike Trout (LAA)
Right Field	Jason Heyward (ATL)

=== Monthly Awards ===
==== Player of the Month ====
Month	American League	National League
April	Josh Hamilton	Matt Kemp
May	Josh Hamilton	Giancarlo Stanton
June	José Bautista	Andrew McCutchen
July	Mike Trout	Andrew McCutchen
August	Miguel Cabrera	Chase Headley
September	Adrián Beltré	Chase Headley

==== Pitcher of the Month ====
Month	American League	National League
April	Jake Peavy	Stephen Strasburg
May	Chris Sale	Gio González
June	Matt Harrison	R. A. Dickey
July	Jason Vargas	Jordan Zimmermann
August	Félix Hernández	Kris Medlen
September	Justin Verlander	Kris Medlen

==== Rookie of the Month ====
Month	American League	National League
April	Yu Darvish	Wade Miley
May	Mike Trout	Bryce Harper
June	Mike Trout	Andrelton Simmons
July	Mike Trout	Anthony Rizzo
August	Mike Trout	Todd Frazier
September	Yoenis Céspedes	Bryce Harper

== Home field attendance and payroll ==
Team name	Wins	%±	Home attendance	%±	Per game	Est. payroll	%±
Philadelphia Phillies	81	−20.6%	3,565,718	−3.1%	44,021	$171,501,558	−0.9%
New York Yankees	95	−2.1%	3,542,406	−3.0%	43,733	$197,977,900	−4.0%
Texas Rangers	93	−3.1%	3,460,280	17.4%	42,720	$124,119,900	32.3%
San Francisco Giants	94	9.3%	3,377,371	−0.3%	41,696	$117,637,350	−5.3%
Los Angeles Dodgers	86	4.9%	3,324,246	13.3%	41,040	$177,033,600	70.6%
St. Louis Cardinals	88	−2.2%	3,262,109	5.4%	40,273	$112,071,000	6.3%
Los Angeles Angels of Anaheim	89	3.5%	3,061,770	−3.3%	37,800	$141,073,500	1.8%
Boston Red Sox	69	−23.3%	3,043,003	−0.4%	37,568	$110,386,000	−33.8%
Detroit Tigers	88	−7.4%	3,028,033	14.6%	37,383	$131,394,000	22.9%
Chicago Cubs	61	−14.1%	2,882,756	−4.5%	35,590	$86,159,366	−36.9%
Milwaukee Brewers	83	−13.5%	2,831,385	−7.8%	34,955	$95,717,000	10.5%
Minnesota Twins	66	4.8%	2,776,354	−12.4%	34,276	$99,066,000	−12.1%
Colorado Rockies	64	−12.3%	2,630,458	−9.6%	32,475	$75,485,000	−17.6%
Atlanta Braves	94	5.6%	2,420,171	2.0%	29,879	$86,208,000	−8.1%
Washington Nationals	98	22.5%	2,370,794	22.2%	29,269	$92,386,000	34.9%
Cincinnati Reds	97	22.8%	2,347,251	6.0%	28,978	$80,309,500	3.9%
New York Mets	74	−3.9%	2,242,803	−4.7%	27,689	$91,621,424	−39.7%
Miami Marlins	69	−4.2%	2,219,444	46.0%	27,401	$107,678,000	86.6%
Arizona Diamondbacks	81	−13.8%	2,177,617	3.4%	26,884	$67,069,833	22.3%
San Diego Padres	76	7.0%	2,123,721	−0.9%	26,219	$55,494,700	21.0%
Baltimore Orioles	93	34.8%	2,102,240	19.8%	25,954	$77,949,000	−11.7%
Toronto Blue Jays	73	−9.9%	2,099,663	15.5%	25,922	$82,352,700	27.5%
Pittsburgh Pirates	79	9.7%	2,091,918	7.8%	25,826	$70,077,000	55.6%
Chicago White Sox	85	7.6%	1,965,955	−1.8%	24,271	$118,208,000	−7.5%
Kansas City Royals	72	1.4%	1,739,859	0.9%	21,480	$61,747,075	72.9%
Seattle Mariners	75	11.9%	1,721,920	−9.2%	21,258	$78,235,600	−9.1%
Oakland Athletics	94	27.0%	1,679,013	13.7%	20,729	$61,202,500	−8.8%
Houston Astros	55	−1.8%	1,607,733	−22.2%	19,849	$37,651,000	−47.1%
Cleveland Indians	68	−15.0%	1,603,596	−12.9%	19,797	$78,911,300	59.7%
Tampa Bay Rays	90	−1.1%	1,559,681	2.0%	19,255	$63,368,700	54.4%

== Uniforms ==
=== New uniforms ===
==== Wholesale changes ====
Five teams have made wholesale changes to their uniforms in 2012, while a sixth has new road uniforms. Two other teams added alternate uniforms to their existing set.

The San Diego Padres were the first team to announce changes to their logos and uniform set on November 9. The new primary features the "SD" cap logo inside a navy circle with the words "San Diego Padres Baseball Club" encircling it. The "swinging friar" logo was also revived, albeit in the current colors. Another secondary logo features the Padres script from last season below the depiction of Petco Park in sand and above the year of establishment; a blue and white version is used on the away and alternate uniforms. The front of the home uniform remains the same, except that the sand trim in "Padres" is now in trim instead of a drop shadow and the addition of navy piping. Originally they'll use the sand Petco patch on the left sleeve, but upon unveiling the uniforms, the "swinging friar" patch was placed instead. The road uniforms now feature "San Diego" in an arched position with navy piping. The alternate blue uniforms feature the "SD" cap logo on the left chest with white piping. All three uniforms now feature the block numerals on the reverse side. The digital camouflage uniforms were retained, save for the change to block numerals. The caps with the sand "SD" were retired.

The Marlins unveiled their changes on November 11, 2011, as the team was rebranded as the Miami Marlins, complete with a new logo featuring a stylized Marlin jumping over an art deco colored "M" in coral, yellow and blue. "MIAMI" will grace the primary white uniform, and there will be an orange home alternate which feature the team name, while the black alt had been reduced to road alternate jersey. The black cap is used for the regular home, away and black alternates, while the orange cap is paired with the orange alternates. The Marlins become the second team to use the city (or state) name on the home uniforms, after the Texas Rangers.

November 15 saw the Baltimore Orioles redesign their road and home uniform sets and returned to a version of the cartoon logo used from the mid-1960s to 1988. The home caps are white in front and black on the back with an orange bill, while the away caps will be all black with an orange bill, both featuring the cartoon bird. They also unveiled a modernized version of the orange alternate uniforms last worn in 1992, and were worn on select home games, but retained the black alternate uniforms paired with the black and orange cap with the "O's" script.

As part of their golden anniversary season, the New York Mets modified their home and road uniforms to resemble the style worn in 1962, having their unveiling November 16. The black drop-shadow trim was removed from the team/city script logos, player numerals and name lettering on the off-white pinstriped home uniforms (now the primary home uniform), the white alternate home uniforms, and the grey road uniforms, all of which were worn only with the team's traditional blue cap with orange "NY" crest and blue undersleeves, belts and socks. In addition, the black alternate jersey (which will be worn occasionally on the road in 2012) is being phased out, to be replaced by a blue alternate starting in 2013. The solid black cap with the blue/white/orange crest will also be retained for one more season, to be worn only with the black alternate jersey. The black cap with blue bill and blue/orange crest has been eliminated. In addition, the Mets have removed the color black from their batting-practice jerseys and caps; both will be blue with orange lettering/logos outlined in white.

The Toronto Blue Jays unveiled new uniforms on November 18, returning to a variation of their vintage logo used from 1977 through 1996. The new logo is similar to the original used from 1977–96, with a few exceptions: a more prominent maple leaf, a sleeker-looking blue jay, serifed modern lettering on the team name, and a split-line blue circle enclosing the logo. The new uniforms are similarly based on the set used from 1989–96; a white home uniform with "Blue Jays", a grey road uniform with "Toronto", and a blue alternate uniform with "Blue Jays". The team/city name is arched above the secondary logo of the blue jay with the maple leaf, sans the baseball, situated on the left side. The secondary logo is also placed in the blue cap. The uniforms use the breathable double-knit polyester fabric, claiming the previously lighter Climate Base fabric became too heavy, once players began to sweat.

The Colorado Rockies replaced their purple road pinstripes with a more traditional solid gray uniform which was unveiled at RockiesFest in Denver in January 2012.

The San Francisco Giants and Atlanta Braves added alternate uniforms to their set. The Giants wear a Sunday road game grey alternate based on the road uniforms they wore during their 1989 World Series run, with the interlocking 'SF' logo on the left chest and black neck-hoop piping. The black piping was also incorporated into the team's normal road gray uniforms. The Braves unveiled a cream (heritage white) home alternates based on the uniforms worn in their first season in Atlanta. The uniform has the 'Braves' wordmark without the tomahawk with the uniform number below on the left chest and navy piping. The sleeves have a logo commemorating the Braves franchise's first season in 1876.

==== Dodgers logo ====
A new, slightly altered Los Angeles Dodgers logo made its way to the Dodgers dugout wall at Dodger Stadium and for their "Social September" promotion in September 2011. The baseball and flight lines have been thickened, while the "o" in the script "Dodgers" no longer has a line on the bottom left. The home uniform script continues to use the previous script, though.

==== Caps and jerseys ====
After reviving the Northwest Green jerseys at home, the Seattle Mariners brought back their navy with teal bill caps, last worn in 2002, for Monday and Friday home contests. Also, their navy road alternate will now have "SEATTLE" on the jersey front.

The Royals unveiled minor tweaks to their light blue home alternate jersey, with all numbers and lettering now white with royal trim, and a revamped away uniform (changed to a darker blue-gray color and a revamped "Kansas City" script). In addition, the team has dropped their light blue caps.

The Cleveland Indians made minor tweaks to the home and alternate uniforms. The white home uniform features navy collar piping and the 'Indians' script in red and navy trim, removing the white inner trim as well as the navy piping on the button lines. The navy alternate features gray collar piping and the 'Indians' script in red and white trim, removing the navy inner trim as well as the grey piping on the button lines.

The Los Angeles Angels of Anaheim revert to the silver halo after changing it to gold the previous year. They also added a sleeve patch that says 'Angels Baseball' with the foundation year (1961) separated by the current logo in between. The logo is wrapped in a red, navy and silver circle. This patch will be placed on all uniforms.

=== Throwbacks ===
As part of their 40th anniversary in Arlington, the Texas Rangers will wear replicas of the four different uniforms they have worn throughout the team's history, the most notable of which are the two uniforms worn during the ownership of then-future president of the United States George W. Bush.

As part of their 50th anniversary, the Astros will wear throwbacks throughout the season, including a game with Colt .45s uniforms.

The Red Sox and the Yankees wore 1912 throwbacks on April 20 to mark the 100th anniversary of Fenway Park. It marked only the second time the Yankees have worn throwbacks; the first was in 1996, when they wore New York Black Yankees uniforms at a Negro leagues tribute game in Detroit.

The Red Sox and Athletics wore 1936 uniforms on May 2 at Fenway Park.

The Twins wore Minneapolis Millers uniforms on June 30 in the second game of a make-up doubleheader against the Royals, who wore the uniforms of the Kansas City Blues.

The Nationals wore the uniforms of the 1924 Washington Senators on July 5 against the Giants, who wore the 1924 New York Giants uniforms.

The Athletics wore the PCL Oakland Oaks uniforms, and the Mariners the Rainiers, on July 8.

The Brewers will wear Milwaukee Bears Negro leagues uniforms on July 28.

The Diamondbacks will wear a throwback uniform on September 15. Fans decided online that their 1998 purple uniform will be worn.

The White Sox are wearing 1972 uniforms on Sundays at home this season.

The Detroit Tigers and Pittsburgh Pirates wore throwback uniforms paying tribute to the Negro league baseball teams Detroit Stars and Pittsburgh Crawfords on May 19.

The Los Angeles Angels of Anaheim and Seattle Mariners wore throwback uniforms of defunct Pacific Coast League teams Los Angeles Angels and Seattle Rainiers on May 26.

The Chicago Cubs and San Francisco Giants wore 1912 throwback uniforms on June 2.

The Pirates and Royals wore Negro leagues uniforms on June 9 – the Pirates, the Homestead Grays and the Royals, the Kansas City Monarchs.

The Tampa Bay Rays wore 'faux-back' 1979 throwback jerseys on June 30 against the Tigers, who also wore throwback jerseys from the same year. Due to the fact the Rays did not exist as a franchise in 1979, their uniform design was inspired from popular uniform styles such as pullovers and two-tone caps.

The San Diego Padres and New York Mets wore 1989 throwback uniforms on August 3.

The St. Louis Cardinals and Milwaukee Brewers celebrated the 30th anniversary of the 1982 World Series by wearing throwback uniforms on August 4. The Cardinals also added a 30th anniversary patch commemorating their World Series victory, exclusive to their throwback uniforms. The next night, the Cardinals wore their road blue uniforms against the Brewers.

The Cincinnati Reds and Philadelphia Phillies wore throwback uniforms from the 1991 season on August 22. Ironically, on June 16, 1991, the Reds and Phillies had worn 1957 uniforms at Veterans Stadium. The Reds won both games.

=== Other uniforms ===
The Cardinals wore special uniforms to commemorate their 2011 World Series win on April 13–14. The 'STL' on the caps was gold with navy trim, while the word 'Cardinals' and the block numbers on the uniforms were gold with navy trim. The Cardinals wore them during the unfurling of their championship flag on April 13, and the presentation of the Commissioner's Trophy and World Series rings on April 14.

MLB players wore No. 42 on April 15, the 65th anniversary of Jackie Robinson's MLB debut. The Dodgers wore a Brooklyn-era cap and batting helmet that day, as well.

The Pirates and Orioles donned camouflage uniforms during Memorial Day weekend.

The Brewers wore an Italian-language batting practice uniform with the word "Birrai" on July 1; their opponents Arizona Diamondbacks ('I D-Backs') also wore Italian-language uniforms. They also wore the Cerveceros uniforms on June 2 against the Pirates ('Piratas').

Players wore special caps on Memorial Day and Independence Day; the Blue Jays also wore special caps on Canada Day, along with a specialized red uniform. This year, a camouflage design was used in lieu of the American and Canadian flags.

In commemoration of the September 11 attacks, all American teams wore caps with the American flag sewn on the left; the Blue Jays sported both the American and Canadian flags on both sides of their caps.

As part of Cinco de Mayo the San Francisco Giants ("Gigantes") and Houston Astros ("Los Astros") wore Spanish-language home uniforms for the game.

On July 6, the New York Mets ("Los Mets") wore blue Spanish-language jerseys for the game against the Chicago Cubs. They wore the uniforms again on August 24 against the Astros.

The Chicago White Sox wore a variation of their home uniforms on September 7 against the Royals, as part of the "Halfway to St. Patty's" promotion. The uniform substitutes the traditional black color for green.

The Athletics and Diamondbacks wore Spanish-language uniforms in celebration of Mexican Independence Day on September 16, against the Orioles and Giants, respectively. The A's used their primary home uniform, with "Atléticos" substituting for "Athletics", while the D-Backs used their black alternate uniform, with "Los D-Backs" substituting for the secondary "A" logo.

=== Patches ===
==== Anniversaries and special events ====
The following teams will wear commemorative patches for special occasions:

Team	Special occasion
Boston Red Sox	100th Anniversary of Fenway Park and #6 patch after the death of Johnny Pesky
Los Angeles Dodgers	50th Anniversary of Dodger Stadium
Baltimore Orioles	20th Anniversary of Oriole Park at Camden Yards
Houston Astros	50th Anniversary of the franchise
New York Mets	50th Anniversary of the franchise
Seattle Mariners	35th Anniversary of the franchise
Texas Rangers	40th Anniversary in the Dallas/Fort Worth Metroplex
Kansas City Royals	Host city of the 2012 MLB All-Star Game
St. Louis Cardinals	To commemorate their 2011 World Series championship 30th Anniversary of their 1982 World Series championship (worn only from August 4–5)
Miami Marlins	Inaugural season of Marlins Park
Colorado Rockies	7-20 patches to remember all who lost their lives during the Aurora shooting. (Worn only on the night of July 20.)

==== Memorials ====
- The New York Mets wore a patch honoring Gary Carter, who died of brain cancer on February 16, 2012. The patch features a black inverted home plate with Carter's number 8 and "KID" inscribed on it.
- The Chicago White Sox sported two black diamond patches on the right sleeve in honor of Bill Skowron (BMS) and Kevin Hickey (HIC MAN). Skowron died on April 27 of heart failure, suffering from lung cancer, while Hickey died on May 16 of undisclosed causes.
- The Major League umpires wore black patches honoring former umpires Marty Springstead (MS), who died January 17, 2012, and Harry Wendelstedt (HW), who died March 9, 2012.
- The San Diego Padres added a black circle patch with the number 48 in honor of the passing of bullpen coach Darrel Akerfelds on June 24.
- The Boston Red Sox added a black circle patch with the number 6 in honor of legend Johnny Pesky, who died on August 13. The patch only applies to their home and alternate uniforms; the road uniforms were fitted with a black armband. On August 21, against the Angels, all Red Sox players and coaches wore No. 6 in Pesky's memory, similar to the approach of all players and coaches wearing No. 42 during Jackie Robinson Day. The Angels also wore the same black patch in Pesky's memory for the game, even though Pesky never worked for the Angels.
- The Oakland Athletics added a black circle patch with the initials "GJN" for pitcher Pat Neshek's day-old son, Gehrig John, who died right before the playoffs.
- At Comerica Park, underneath the American flag on the outfield flagpole, the Detroit Tigers flew a plain white flag with the initials CJ in the center. This was in memory of Charles P. Jones, the team's vice president, who died on August 13.

== New stadium ==
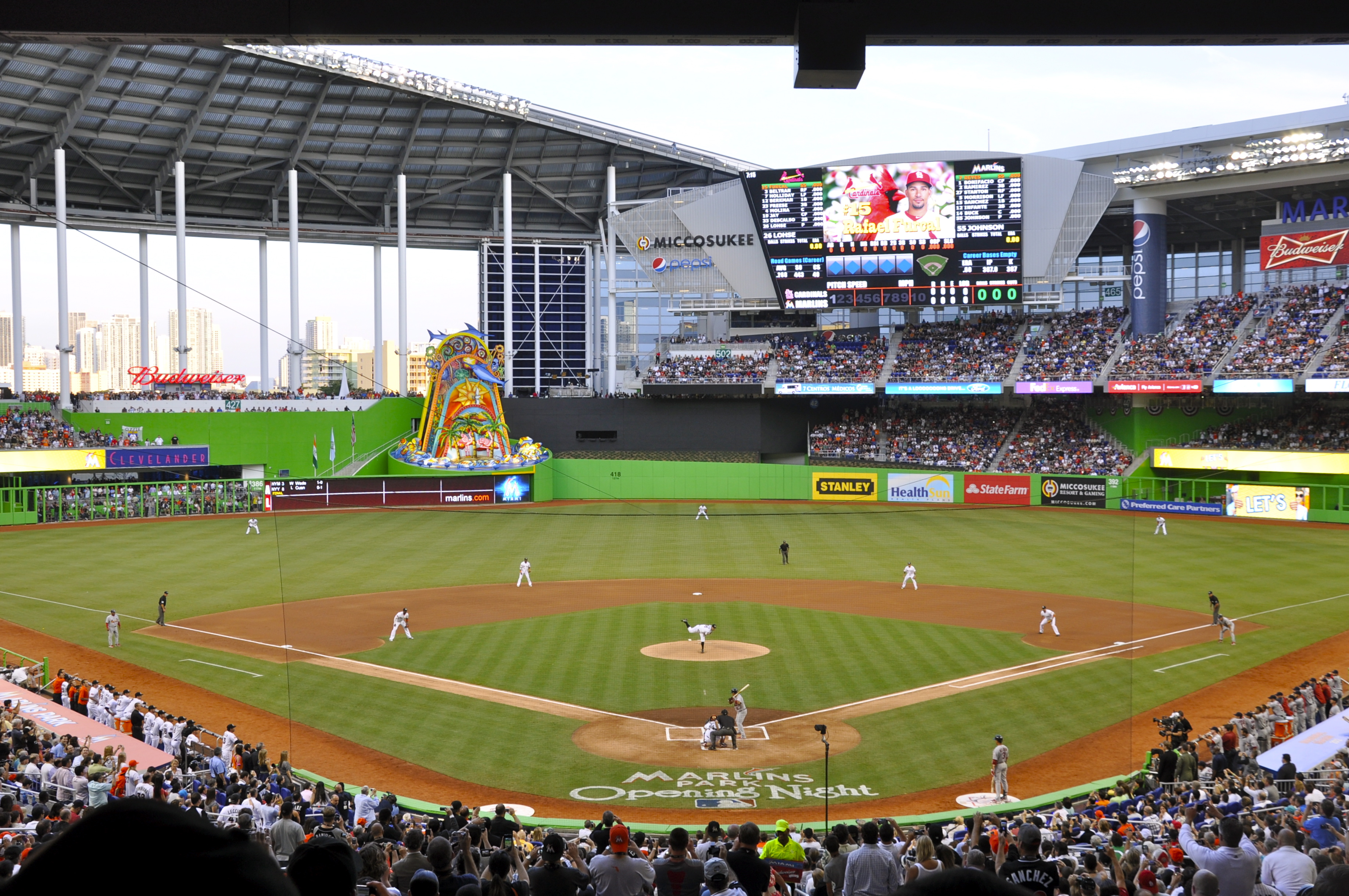
Opening day at Marlins Park.

The Florida Marlins vacated Sun Life Stadium at the end of the 2011 season and moved into Marlins Park, which was built on the site of the old Orange Bowl stadium. The team officially adopted its new name of Miami Marlins on November 11, 2011.

== Anniversaries ==
The 2012 season marked the 100th anniversary of the opening of Boston's Fenway Park. In addition, Dodger Stadium—home of the Los Angeles Dodgers—celebrated its 50th anniversary, and the Baltimore Orioles home, Oriole Park at Camden Yards, also celebrated its 20th anniversary.

=== Mets, Astros golden anniversaries ===
The 2012 season also marked the 50th anniversary for the New York Mets and the Houston Astros, but the 51st season for both teams.

The Mets began play four years after the Brooklyn Dodgers and New York Giants moved west in 1958, leaving New York City with only one MLB team in the Yankees. In 1959, New York City attorney William Shea, with support from baseball figures including former Dodgers executive Branch Rickey, proposed a third major league called the Continental League. Houston and New York City were both among the announced CL cities. MLB responded to the threat by placing new franchises in several of these cities, and offered a National League franchise to the owners of the proposed New York CL team, who accepted. With Shea's goal of bringing a second major-league team to New York successful, he abandoned the new league, which officially folded in 1960 without ever playing a game. The Mets began play in 1962 at the Giants' former home of the Polo Grounds in Manhattan, moved in 1964 to Shea Stadium (named after the aforementioned William Shea) in Queens, and opened their current home of Citi Field, adjacent to the former Shea Stadium site, in 2009.

The Astros were also enfranchised as a direct response to the plans to launch the CL. They began play in 1962 as the Houston Colt .45s; following a dispute with Colt Firearms over revenues from souvenir sales and licensing fees, the team moved to the Astrodome in 1965 and renamed itself the Astros. In 2000, they opened their current home, now known as Minute Maid Park. In honor of the Astros' 50th anniversary, they donned different throwback uniforms at home on Friday night themed to each decade.

== Television ==
=== National ===
Major League Baseball enters the 6th year of seven-year contracts it signed with its broadcast partners prior to the 2007 season. This year, Fox will televise the Saturday Game of the Week (which will be shown in prime time each week from May 19 to July 7), the All-Star Game, the National League Championship Series, and the World Series. TBS will show a Sunday Game of the Week, the All-Star Selection Show, all but two Division Series games, the American League Championship Series, and the new wild card elimination games. ESPN will show games on Sunday, Monday, and Wednesday nights (with Monday and Wednesday Night Baseball airing on ESPN2 during April, May and early June due to ESPN's priority to the NBA regular season and playoff coverage, and then Monday Night Baseball moving to form either a Wednesday night doubleheader or a simultaneous airing of a Monday Night game on ESPN and a Wednesday Night game on ESPN2 when the NFL season starts, to accommodate Monday Night Football), and the All-Star Home Run Derby. They will also air 10 spring training games, as well as five nationally televised games on Opening Week from April 4–6. The MLB Network will air a national Game of the Week broadcast every Thursday and the two Division Series games not shown on TBS. Major League Baseball International will air in syndication the All-Star Game, the ALCS, and the World Series to global markets.

=== Local ===
The Padres switched from Cox Cable-owned 4SD to a new channel called Fox Sports San Diego, which the Padres also have a minority stake in.

This is the last season of Houston Astros games on Fox Sports Houston and KTXH. Starting next season, all games will be on Comcast SportsNet Houston, a new channel the Astros will co-own with the Houston Rockets.

The Mid-Atlantic Sports Network (MASN), which broadcasts Orioles and Nationals games, became the latest network to adjust its score box to the 16:9 aspect ratio for high-definition television broadcasts. The adjustment, which began with Fox Sports' MLB coverage in 2010, was later adopted to other networks, notably ESPN, TBS, Fox Sports Net (except Fox Sports South and some terrestrial television broadcasts produced by Fox Sports), and Root Sports during the 2011 season. As of this season, only the YES Network, New England Sports Network, Comcast SportsNet, SportsNet New York and SportsTime Ohio have yet to move to the newly adjusted high definition broadcast.

== Team purchases ==
- On March 27, 2012, the Dodgers were sold to Guggenheim Baseball Management LLC, a group that included NBA legend Magic Johnson for $2.1 billion. The new management team, to include baseball executive Stan Kasten, still had to await approval by two different courts—one handling the Dodgers' bankruptcy, and the other overseeing the divorce of former owners Frank and Jamie McCourt. The sale was finalized on May 1, at which time the new management team officially took over.
- The San Diego Padres were sold to a group headed by Ron Fowler, golfer Phil Mickelson and Peter O'Malley, the former owner of the Dodgers for US $800 million in August.

== Retirements ==
- Atlanta Braves third baseman Chipper Jones announced on March 22, 2012, that he will retire after 19 seasons at the conclusion of the 2012 season.
- Catcher Iván Rodríguez officially announced his retirement on April 23, 2012. Playing for six different teams in a 21-year career, most notably with the Texas Rangers, Rodríguez set a record for most Gold Glove Awards at catcher with 13, while earning AL MVP honors in 1999 and a 2003 World Series title with the Florida Marlins. He also appeared in 14 All-Star Games and won seven Silver Slugger Awards at catcher, while appearing in 2,543 games behind the plate, a Major League record.
- Pitcher Kerry Wood of the Chicago Cubs announced his retirement on May 18, 2012.
- Detroit Tigers outfielder Magglio Ordóñez retired from baseball on June 3, 2012.
- Shortstop Omar Vizquel stated on June 26 that he plans to retire at the end of the season after a 24-year career.
- Pitcher Dontrelle Willis announced his retirement on July 2.
- Outfielder Jay Gibbons announced his retirement on July 9.
- Pitcher Ben Sheets announced his retirement on October 2 that he will start the Atlanta Braves regular-season finale on October 3 and then will retire after the start.

== Retired numbers ==
- The St. Louis Cardinals retired former manager Tony La Russa's No. 10 prior to the May 11 game against the Atlanta Braves. La Russa served as manager from 1996–2011 and managed in three World Series for the Cardinals, winning in 2006 and 2011.
- The Atlanta Braves retired John Smoltz's No. 29 and inducted him into the Atlanta Braves Hall of Fame prior to the June 8 game against the Toronto Blue Jays. Smoltz retired with a career record of 213–155 with a 3.33 ERA and 3,084 strikeouts. He also added 154 saves and was 15–4 in the post-season.
- The Cincinnati Reds retired Barry Larkin's No. 11 prior to the August 25 game against the St Louis Cardinals at Great American Ball Park. Larkin played shortstop for his hometown from 1986 to 2004 and was one of the pivotal players on the 1990 Reds' World Series championship team. Larkin was elected to the National Baseball Hall of Fame in January 2012 and was inducted on July 22. Larkin is considered one of the top players of his era, winning nine Silver Slugger awards and three Gold Glove awards. He was selected to the Major League All-Star Game twelve times, and was elected the 1995 National League MVP.
- The Minnesota Twins retired former manager Tom Kelly's No. 10 prior to the September 8 game against the Cleveland Indians at Target Field. Kelly served as manager from 1986 to 2001, and led the Twins to their only World Series victories in 1987 and 1991.

== See also ==
- 2012 Korea Professional Baseball season
- 2012 Nippon Professional Baseball season
