= Wahoo, Nebraska =

City in and county seat of Saunders County, Nebraska, United States

- City
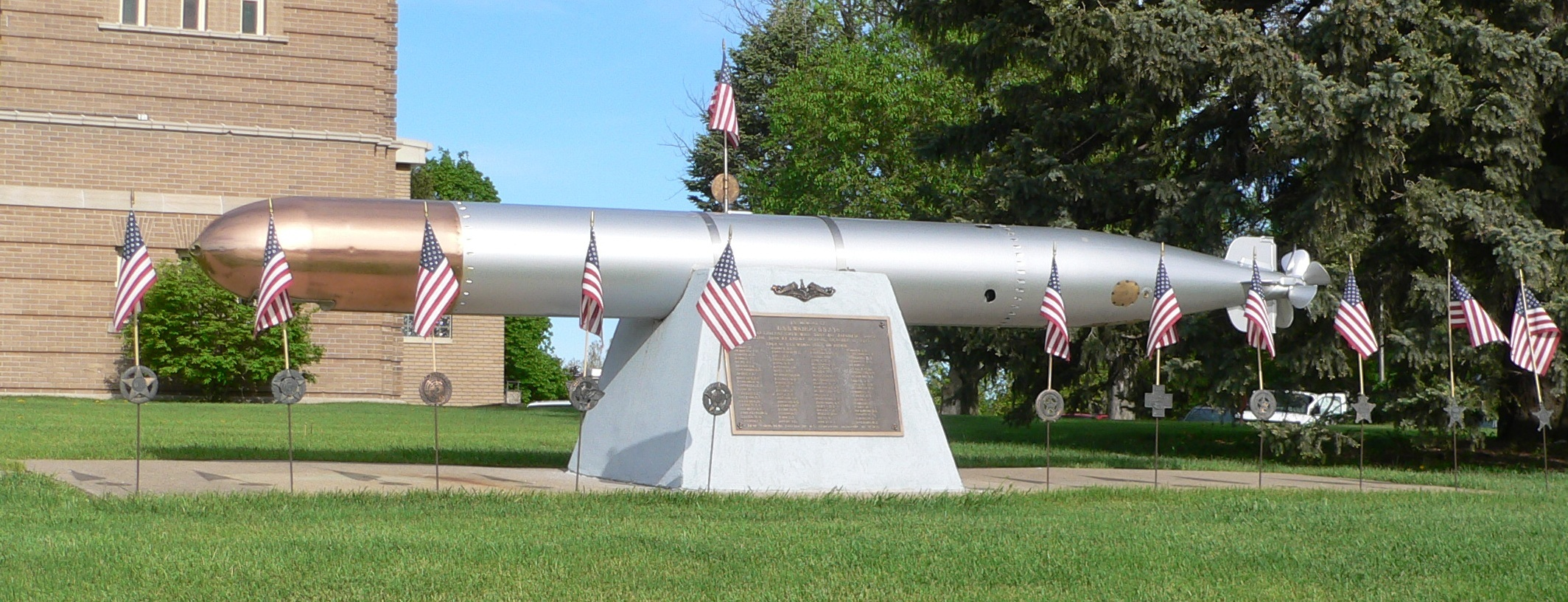
- Memorial to World War II submarine USS Wahoo on front lawn of Saunders County Courthouse in Wahoo, May 2010
- Motto: "We Welcome You"
- Location of Wahoo, Nebraska
- Coordinates: 41°13′00″N 96°37′03″W
- Country: United States
- State: Nebraska
- County: Saunders

Area
  - Total: 2.99 sq mi (7.75 km^{2})
  - Land: 2.99 sq mi (7.75 km^{2})
  - Water: 0 sq mi (0.00 km^{2})
- Elevation: 1,230 ft (370 m)

Population (2020)
  - Total: 4,818
  - Density: 1,610.9/sq mi (621.98/km^{2})
- Time zone: UTC-6 (Central (CST))
  - Summer (DST): UTC-5 (CDT)
- ZIP code: 68066
- Area code: 402
- FIPS code: 31-50965
- GNIS feature ID: 0838310
- Website: wahoo.ne.us

Wahoo (/ˈwɑːhuː/ WAH-hoo;) is a city and the county seat of Saunders County, Nebraska, United States. The population was 4,818 at the 2020 census.

== History ==
Wahoo was founded in 1870. The town's name comes from a Dakota language word waƞhu meaning "arrow stem" (waƞ - a contracted form of waƞhiƞkpe for "arrow" - followed by hu, a word for a trunk or stem of a plant), which refers to the eastern wahoo (Euonymus atropurpureus), a shrub found on the banks of Wahoo Creek. The town was originally built by predominantly Czech, German, and Scandinavian settlers.

== Geography ==
According to the United States Census Bureau, the city has a total area of 2.65 square miles (6.86 km^{2}), all land.

== Demographics ==
Historical population
Census	Pop.	Note	%±
1880	1,064		—
1890	2,006		88.5%
1900	2,100		4.7%
1910	2,168		3.2%
1920	2,338		7.8%
1930	2,689		15.0%
1940	2,648		−1.5%
1950	3,128		18.1%
1960	3,610		15.4%
1970	3,835		6.2%
1980	3,555		−7.3%
1990	3,681		3.5%
2000	3,942		7.1%
2010	4,508		14.4%
2020	4,818		6.9%
U.S. Decennial Census; 2012 Estimate

=== 2020 census ===
As of the 2020 census, Wahoo had a population of 4,818. The median age was 38.2 years. 27.3% of residents were under the age of 18 and 18.5% of residents were 65 years of age or older. For every 100 females there were 99.9 males, and for every 100 females age 18 and over there were 96.6 males age 18 and over.

99.3% of residents lived in urban areas, while 0.7% lived in rural areas.

There were 1,849 households in Wahoo, of which 32.4% had children under the age of 18 living in them. Of all households, 49.9% were married-couple households, 17.5% were households with a male householder and no spouse or partner present, and 27.5% were households with a female householder and no spouse or partner present. About 32.4% of all households were made up of individuals and 16.8% had someone living alone who was 65 years of age or older.

There were 2,017 housing units, of which 8.3% were vacant. The homeowner vacancy rate was 1.5% and the rental vacancy rate was 8.7%.

Racial composition as of the 2020 census
Race	Number	Percent
White	4,484	93.1%
Black or African American	19	0.4%
American Indian and Alaska Native	25	0.5%
Asian	15	0.3%
Native Hawaiian and Other Pacific Islander	1	0.0%
Some other race	80	1.7%
Two or more races	194	4.0%
Hispanic or Latino (of any race)	199	4.1%

=== 2010 census ===
At the 2010 census there were 4,508 people, 1,801 households, and 1,131 families living in the city. The population density was 1,701.1 inhabitants per square mile (656.8/km^{2}). There were 1,962 housing units at an average density of 740.4 per square mile (285.9/km^{2}). The racial makeup of the city was 94.5% White, 0.8% African American, 0.3% Native American, 1.0% Asian, 1.4% from other races, and 1.9% from two or more races. Hispanic or Latino of any race were 3.5%.

Of the 1,801 households 31.8% had children under the age of 18 living with them, 50.8% were married couples living together, 8.7% had a female householder with no husband present, 3.3% had a male householder with no wife present, and 37.2% were non-families. 33.3% of households were one person and 16.2% were one person aged 65 or older. The average household size was 2.40 and the average family size was 3.08.

The median age was 38.7 years. 26.5% of residents were under the age of 18; 6.7% were between the ages of 18 and 24; 24.4% were from 25 to 44; 25.3% were from 45 to 64; and 17.2% were 65 or older. The gender makeup of the city was 49.5% male and 50.5% female.

=== 2000 census ===
At the 2000 census, there were 3,942 people, 1,583 households, and 992 families living in the city. The population density was 1,841.1 inhabitants per square mile (710.9/km^{2}). There were 1,669 housing units at an average density of 779.5 per square mile (301.0/km^{2}). The racial makeup of the city was 98.40% White, 0.15% African American, 0.30% Native American, 0.36% Asian, 0.30% from other races, and 0.48% from two or more races. Hispanic or Latino of any race were 0.84% of the population.

There were 1,583 households, 31.8% had children under the age of 18 living with them, 51.6% were married couples living together, 8.6% had a female householder with no husband present, and 37.3% were non-families. 33.2% of households were made up of individuals, and 19.3% were one person aged 65 or older. The average household size was 2.39, and the average family size was 3.08.

The population was spread out, with 26.3% under the age of 18, 6.5% from 18 to 24, 26.4% from 25 to 44, 19.5% from 45 to 64, and 21.4% 65 or older. The median age was 39 years. For every 100 females, there were 90.1 males. For every 100 females age 18 and over, there were 84.5 males.

The median household income was $35,104, and the median family income was $46,094. Males had a median income of $31,729 versus $22,138 for females. The per capita income for the city was $16,765. About 7.5% of families and 8.3% of the population were below the poverty line, including 7.5% of those under age 18 and 9.3% of those age 65 or over.

== In popular culture ==
Beginning in February 1996, the city was denoted the location of the "home office" that produces the Top Ten List for David Letterman's Late Show program, having relocated from Grand Rapids, Michigan. The town had lobbied Letterman for the status for months. It had the Nebraska legislature proclaim Letterman an admiral in the Great Navy of the State of Nebraska, and it inundated him with letters, postcards, and bribes of flowers, clothing, animals, alcoholic beverages, shredded money, and free checkups at the Wahoo Medical Center. When Letterman jokingly said he wanted more, Wahoo sent him a '76 Ford Pinto with a sofa attached to the hood, a wall clock made of cow droppings, and two of the town's teenagers, brothers Jeff and Josh Price. The nightly recap of the Top Ten List at the CBS website was titled The Wahoo Gazette.

== Education ==
Wahoo Public Schools operates the area public schools.

The town has two parochial schools. Saint Wenceslaus Elementary serves K-6th grades while Bishop Neumann Junior/Senior High School serves 7th through 12th grades.

Wahoo was also the home of the now defunct John F. Kennedy College (1965–1975). In intercollegiate athletics, the school became nationally known as the inaugural winner of the tournament which later became known as the Women's College World Series in softball, claiming the first three national championships (1969–71).

== Notable people ==
- Shuko Akune, actress
- Clarence William Anderson, author and illustrator of children's books, most notably the Billy and Blaze series
- George Beadle, geneticist and Nobel Prize laureate
- Sam Crawford, Hall of Fame baseball player with the Cincinnati Reds and Detroit Tigers. Nicknamed Wahoo Sam.
- Howard Hanson, Pulitzer Prize–winning composer, conductor, author, and educator
- Dave Heineman, the 39th Governor of the State of Nebraska, grew up partly in Wahoo, among other Nebraska towns
- Zach Miller, professional American football player
- Jack Natteford, Hollywood screenwriter
- Tillie Olsen, writer
- Fannie Quigley, pioneer and prospector
- Darryl F. Zanuck, Academy Award-winning producer, writer, actor, director, studio executive, co-founder of Twentieth Century Fox

== See also ==
- List of municipalities in Nebraska
