= Philip Humber's perfect game =

American baseball feat

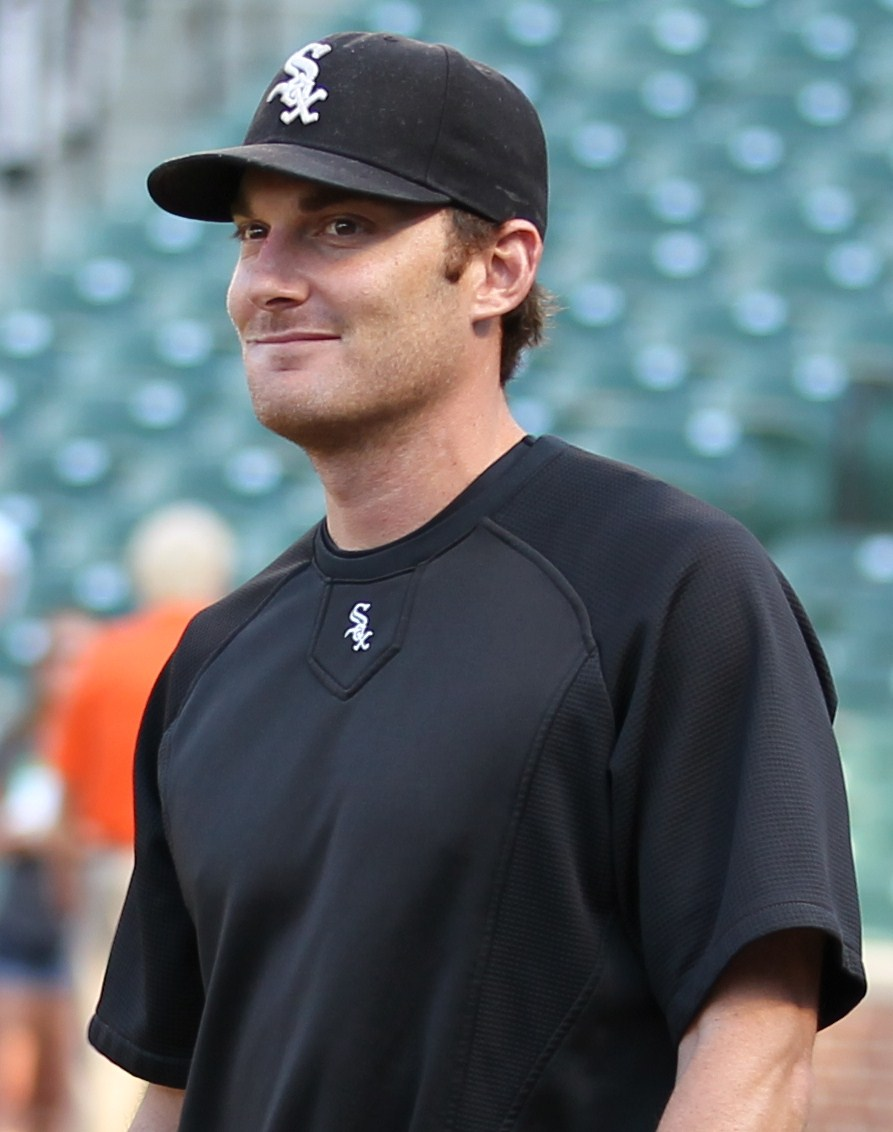
- Philip Humber with the Chicago White Sox in 2011
Chicago White Sox	Seattle Mariners
4	0
	1	2	3	4	5	6	7	8	9	R	H	E
Chicago White Sox	0	1	2	0	0	0	0	0	1	4	9	0
Seattle Mariners	0	0	0	0	0	0	0	0	0	0	0	0
- Date: April 21, 2012
- Venue: Safeco Field
- City: Seattle, Washington
- Managers: Robin Ventura (Chicago White Sox); Eric Wedge (Seattle Mariners)
- Umpires: HP: Brian Runge; 1B: Marvin Hudson; 2B: Tim McClelland; 3B: Ted Barrett
- Attendance: 22,472
- Television: Fox
- TV announcers: Dave Sims (play-by-play); Eric Karros (color commentary)
- Radio: WSCR
- Radio announcers: Ed Farmer (play-by-play); Darrin Jackson (color commentary)

Philip Humber of the Chicago White Sox pitched a perfect game against the Seattle Mariners by retiring all 27 batters he faced on April 21, 2012, as the White Sox defeated the Mariners 4–0. It was the 21st perfect game in Major League Baseball (MLB) history and the third by a member of the White Sox, and remains the earliest calendar date for a perfect game in MLB history. It was Humber's first career complete game, although he had come close to achieving no-hitters on several occasions at several levels of organized baseball. The game was played in Seattle and broadcast regionally by Fox Sports in the two teams' metropolitan areas.

Humber, a top pitching prospect from a Texas high school, attended Rice University, where he had a successful career. A high draft pick by the New York Mets, he debuted in MLB for the Mets before headlining a group of four prospects traded to the Minnesota Twins for Johan Santana. After two ineffective seasons with the Twins, Humber pitched a season for the Kansas City Royals. Acquired on waivers by the Chicago White Sox in 2011, Humber had his first successful season in an MLB starting rotation. The perfect game, Humber's 30th career start and his 2nd of the 2012 season, totaled 96 pitches.

== Background ==
Humber was named 2001 Texas High School Class 4A Player of the Year and enrolled at Rice University for the next season. Humber flirted with a no-hitter in college, pitching for the Rice Owls baseball team. On April 6, 2002, he held a no-hitter going into the eighth inning against the San Jose State Spartans baseball team. In that contest, he surrendered a pinch hit single in the eighth, but did not allow any runs until a ninth-inning home run.

"I mean, I can't even put it into words. I'm just so happy. There are so many good things happening right now. This just adds to the list."

— Philip Humber

The New York Mets drafted Humber with the third overall draft choice in that year's amateur draft. After pitching in the minor leagues, he pitched in five games for the Mets during the 2006 and 2007 seasons. He also came close to a no-hitter in Minor League Baseball. On August 22, 2007, he pitched 8 1/3 no-hit innings for the Triple-A New Orleans Zephyrs of the Pacific Coast League against the Iowa Cubs. Humber ended up with a no decision.

The Mets traded Humber along with Carlos Gómez, Kevin Mulvey, and Deolis Guerra for two-time Cy Young Award-winning pitcher Johan Santana that offseason. Humber pitched for the Twins in 2008 and 2009, then signed a minor league contract with the Kansas City Royals after the 2009 season. After pitching for Kansas City for 2010, the Oakland Athletics claimed him on waivers from the Royals, but waived him a week later, at which point the Chicago White Sox claimed him.

Humber nearly achieved a no-hitter for the 2011 Chicago White Sox twice. On April 25, 2011, in the sixth start of his career, he took a no-hitter into the seventh inning against the New York Yankees at Yankee Stadium but, with one out, Alex Rodriguez singled up the middle, leaving Humber to finish with seven scoreless innings. Later that year, he took a no-hitter into the sixth inning against the Washington Nationals on June 26, but ended up earning a 2–1 loss when he surrendered a seventh inning home run to Danny Espinosa. In that contest, Jerry Hairston Jr. broke up the no-hitter leading off the sixth after Roger Bernadina earned a hit by pitch to break up the perfect game in the fourth.

In 2011, Humber pitched a career-high 163 innings, but expected to pitch more and build on his success with the departure of Mark Buehrle from the White Sox. Although the 2012 Chicago White Sox' rotation was said to be made up of five number three starters, Humber was the number five starter entering the season, of which his perfect game was Humber's second start. Humber was scheduled to make his 2012 season debut for the White Sox on April 10, but the game was rained out. He was then made available for middle relief. In his season debut, on April 16, Humber allowed one run, six hits, and three walks in 5 1/3 innings, throwing 115 pitches.

== The game ==
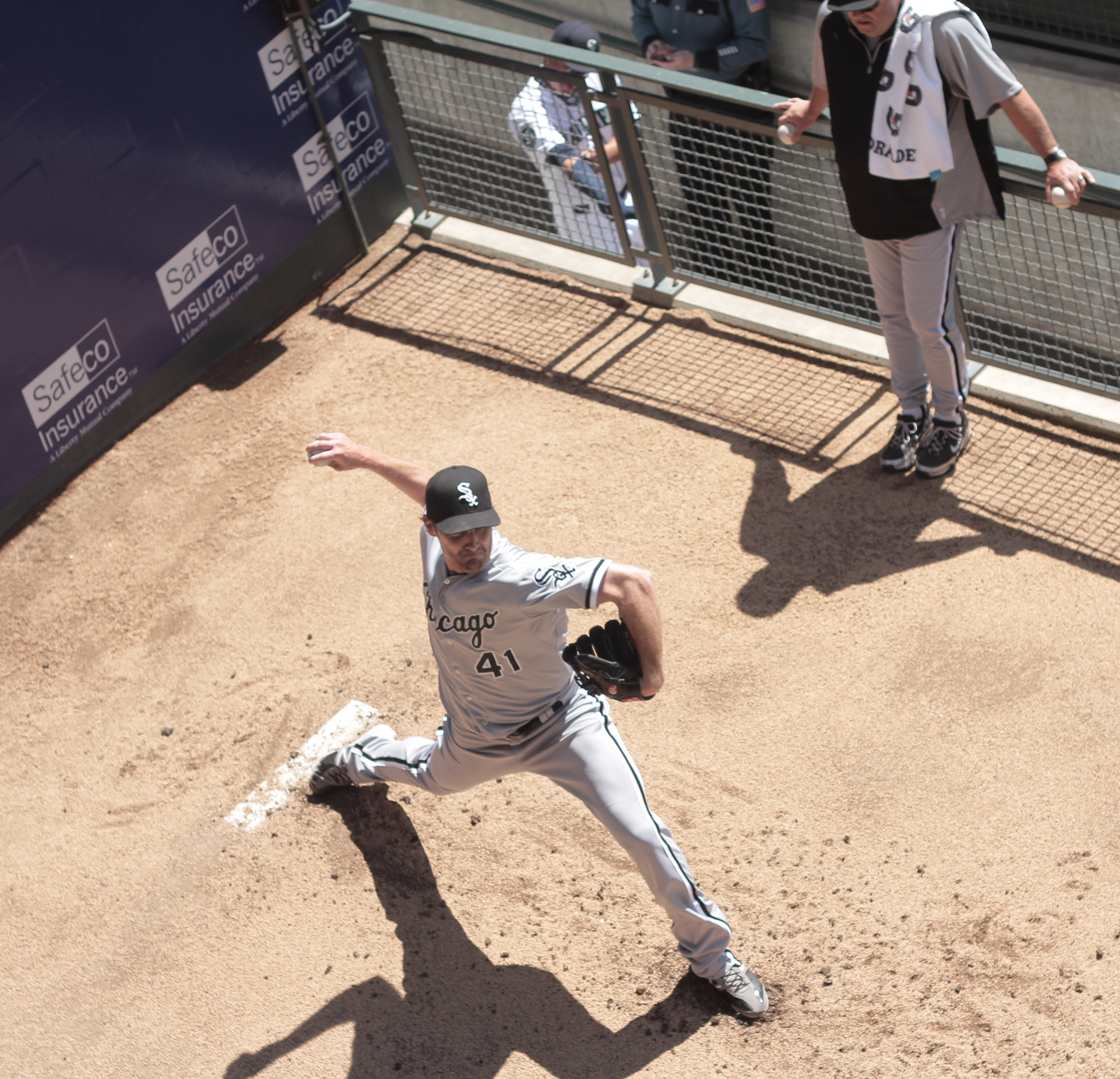
Humber warms up on April 21, 2012, prior to throwing a perfect game.

"I don't know what Philip Humber is doing in this list. No idea what my name is doing there, but I'm thankful it's there."

— Philip Humber

Humber's second start of the season took place on the road in Safeco Field in Seattle, Washington, on April 21, 2012, and was played in front of a crowd of 22,472 people. The White Sox' catcher was A. J. Pierzynski, and Humber's mound opponent, Blake Beavan, was a 2007 Texas high school player of the year. After the game, Beavan said that both starting pitchers shared a high school coach and played in Irving, Texas. The home plate, first, second, and third base umpires were Brian Runge, Marvin Hudson, Tim McClelland, and Ted Barrett respectively. The game was broadcast on Fox, with Mariners' play-by-play broadcaster Dave Sims and national color commentator Eric Karros on the call, and the game lasted two hours and 17 minutes. Karros, before the game, describing Humber's previous few games, remarked, "Gotta be a little better today."

Beavan threw a quality start for Seattle, while Humber retired all 27 batters he faced, with his fastball reaching 92 miles per hour (148 km/h). The closest a batter got to a hit was Dustin Ackley's fourth-inning line drive over the head of right fielder Alex Ríos; Ríos made a leaping catch on the warning track. The Mariners began talking about Humber's dominance in the fifth inning as they sought to break up the perfect game. Humber recorded the final out on a full-count check-swing strikeout of Brendan Ryan. The ball got away from catcher Pierzynski, but home plate umpire Runge ruled that Ryan had failed to check his swing. Ryan took steps toward first base but, when he saw that Pierzynski had successfully gathered the ball and thrown to first, he argued the call with Runge. The Fox Sports broadcast never showed any angle which definitively proved whether Ryan had successfully checked his swing, but many fans and media members felt the call was incorrect. Ryan himself refused to discuss the play after the game and offered nothing but praise for Humber. Had Ryan reached first base and no other baserunner been allowed, it would have been the first time in Major League Baseball history that an otherwise perfect game was spoiled by an uncaught third strike. This feat would instead first be accomplished on May 5, 2021, when the only baserunner Baltimore Orioles pitcher John Means allowed in his no-hitter of the Mariners was a third-inning uncaught third strike to Sam Haggerty, who was later caught stealing second base, allowing Means to face the minimum 27 batters.

Humber finished the game with nine strikeouts; the other batters were retired with five groundouts and 13 flyouts. Humber threw only 96 pitches, making this a Maddux and the first perfect game thrown with fewer than 100 pitches since David Cone's perfect game on July 18, 1999. Humber had only started 29 major league games prior to throwing his perfect game, making him the pitcher with the second-fewest starts prior to throwing a perfect game, behind fellow White Sox Charlie Robertson. MLB.com has published a video of all 27 outs recorded by Humber.

The game was available on television only in the Chicago and Seattle markets, because a game between the New York Yankees and the Boston Red Sox at Fenway Park, also on the network, was broadcast by more affiliates. Games between those two rivals generate a great deal of interest and receive extensive media coverage, and are often broadcast on national television. Fox did, however, cut away from the Yankees–Red Sox game (which the Yankees overcame an early 9–0 deficit to win 15–9), which was already in the seventh inning, to show the final three outs of Humber's perfect game, even in the Boston and New York markets.

== Aftermath ==
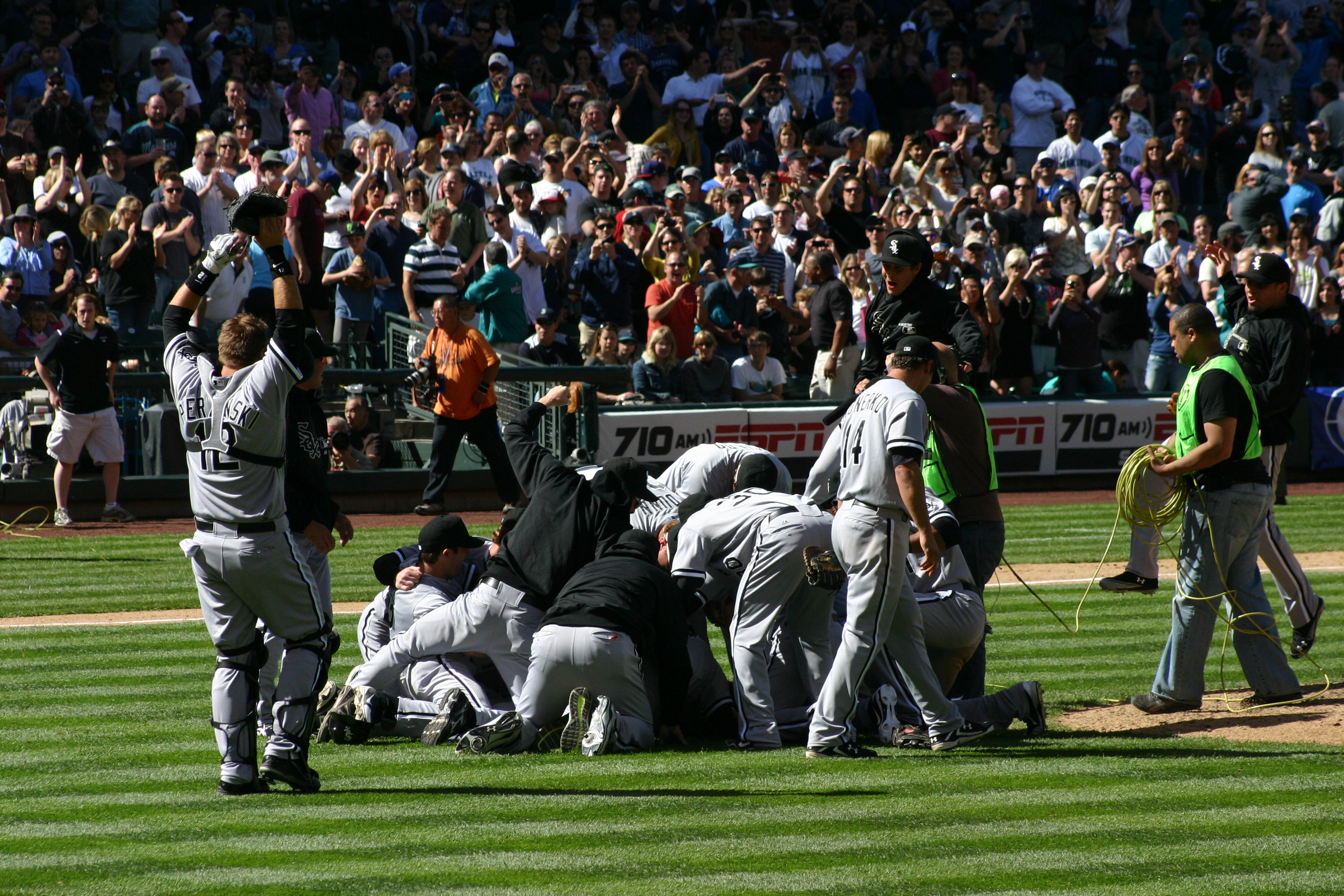
Humber being swarmed by teammates after the perfect game at Safeco Field

It was the 21st perfect game in MLB history and the first since Roy Halladay's perfect game on May 29, 2010. It was the third perfect game in White Sox history (tying them at the time with the Yankees for most perfect games), after Charlie Robertson's (who threw the only other perfect game in April in MLB history) on April 30, 1922, and Mark Buehrle's on July 23, 2009, and the 18th no-hitter in White Sox history (tying them with the Red Sox for second most no-hitters). It was Humber's second start of 2012 and first career complete game.

Humber went 1–0 with a 0.63 earned run average in 14 1/3 innings while striking out 16 over 2 starts that week, including the perfect game, resulting in his selection as American League Player of the Week for the week ending April 22. He received a congratulatory phone call from President Barack Obama, a White Sox fan, and received news that his perfect game would be memorialized with a plaque at the National Baseball Hall of Fame and Museum. Humber made an appearance on the Late Show with David Letterman on April 23, where he read the Top Ten List.

Humber became the seventh former member of the Mets to go on to throw a no-hitter for another team. The other six are Nolan Ryan, Tom Seaver, Mike Scott, Dwight Gooden, Hideo Nomo, and David Cone. The New York Mets, at the time of Humber's perfect game, had never had a no-hitter thrown by a player in the 50-year history of the franchise, though Johan Santana accomplished the feat six weeks later.

The Mariners went hitless for the third time in franchise history and this was the first time that no Mariner reached base. However, the team went on to pitch two no-hitters in 2012, both of which were 1–0 wins that took place at Safeco Field. One of them was the first perfect game in franchise history, by Félix Hernández, making them the first team to be on both the losing and winning end of a perfect game in the same season and marking the first time two perfect games were thrown in the same park in the same season.

As of 2025, Humber is the only pitcher in Major League history to have thrown a perfect game but never achieved double-digit wins in a season. He and Domingo Germán are the only two pitchers whose only career complete game was a perfect game.

== Statistics ==
=== Line score ===
Team	1	2	3	4	5	6	7	8	9	R	H	E
Chicago White Sox (8–6)	0	1	2	0	0	0	0	0	1	4	9	0
Seattle Mariners (7–9)	0	0	0	0	0	0	0	0	0	0	0	0
WP: Philip Humber (1–0) LP: Blake Beavan (1–2); Home runs: CWS: Paul Konerko (2); SEA: None

=== Box score ===
Chicago	AB	R	H	RBI	BB	SO	AVG
Alejandro De Aza, CF	5	0	2	1	0	1	.268
Brent Morel, 3B	5	1	1	0	0	2	.128
Adam Dunn, DH	4	0	0	0	0	1	.245
Paul Konerko, 1B	4	1	2	2	0	1	.352
A. J. Pierzynski, C	4	0	1	1	0	0	.357
Alex Ríos, RF	3	0	1	0	1	1	.293
Alexei Ramírez, SS	4	0	0	0	0	1	.250
Dayan Viciedo, LF	3	0	0	0	0	0	.186
Brent Lillibridge, LF	1	1	1	0	0	0	.100
Gordon Beckham, 2B	3	1	1	0	0	0	.179
Totals	36	4	9	4	1	7	.250

BATTING

- HR: Konerko (2, 2nd inning off Beavan, 0 on, 0 out)
- TB: Rios, A; Beckham, G; Konerko 5; De Aza 2; Pierzynski; Lillibridge; Morel
- RBI: Konerko 2 (11); Pierzynski (14); De Aza (7)
- 2-out RBI: Konerko; Pierzynski; De Aza
- Runners left in scoring position, 2 out: Ramirez, Al 2; Dunn, A
- Team RISP: 3-for-8
- Team LOB: 7

BASERUNNING

- SB: Lillibridge (3, 2nd base off Delabar/Olivo)

Chicago	IP	H	R	ER	BB	SO	HR	ERA
Philip Humber (W, 1–0)	9	0	0	0	0	9	0	0.63
Totals	9	0	0	0	0	9	0	0.00

Seattle	AB	R	H	RBI	BB	SO	AVG
Chone Figgins, LF	3	0	0	0	0	1	.226
Dustin Ackley, 2B	3	0	0	0	0	0	.246
Ichiro Suzuki, RF	3	0	0	0	0	1	.266
Justin Smoak, 1B	3	0	0	0	0	2	.203
Kyle Seager, 3B	3	0	0	0	0	1	.275
Jesus Montero, DH	3	0	0	0	0	1	.245
Michael Saunders, CF	3	0	0	0	0	1	.209
Miguel Olivo, C	2	0	0	0	0	1	.125
John Jaso, PH	1	0	0	0	0	0	.250
Munenori Kawasaki, SS	2	0	0	0	0	0	.133
Brendan Ryan, PH	1	0	0	0	0	1	.200
Totals	27	0	0	0	0	9	.000

Seattle	IP	H	R	ER	BB	SO	HR	ERA
Blake Beavan (L, 1–2)	6	7	3	3	1	1	1	3.26
Lucas Luetge	1	0	0	0	0	2	0	0.00
Steve Delabar	2	2	1	1	0	4	0	6.43
Totals	9	9	4	4	1	7	1	4.00

=== Other info ===
- HBP: Beckham, G (by Beavan)
- Pitches-strikes: Humber 96–67; Beavan 101–70; Luetge 11–7; Delabar 28–22
- Groundouts-flyouts: Humber 5–5; Beavan 7–4; Luetge 0–0; Delabar 1–1
- Batters faced: Humber 27; Beavan 27; Luetge 3; Delabar 8
- Umpires: HP: Brian Runge; 1B: Marvin Hudson; 2B: Tim McClelland; 3B: Ted Barrett
- Weather: 64 °F (17.8 °C), sunny
- Wind: 4 miles per hour (6.4 km/h; 3.5 kn), L to R
- Time: 2:17
- Attendance: 22,472
- Venue: Safeco Field
