= Clarence William Anderson =

American writer

- Born: Clarence William Anderson; 1891; Wahoo, Nebraska, United States
- Died: 1971 (aged 79–80)
- Other names: C.W. Anderson
- Occupation(s): Writer, Illustrator
- Organization: Society of American Graphic Artists
- Known for: "Billy and Blaze" book series
- Notable work: Billy and Blaze series; Heads Up, Heels Down

Clarence William Anderson (1891–1971), born in Wahoo, Nebraska, and known professionally as C.W. Anderson, was a writer and illustrator of children's books. Anderson had an interest in horses and drawing. When he wasn't out riding horses, he was drawing them, taking great interest in their bone structure and conformation. Anderson started his career by illustrating for other authors, but eventually began developing texts to accompany his realistic and lively black and white drawings. He is best known for his "Billy and Blaze" book series.

The adventures of Billy and Blaze revolve around proper care of the horse, while teaching a lesson. Anderson would go to great lengths to give accurate information. He would even go on to write Heads Up, Heels Down as a training tool for young horse lovers. All of the stories Anderson wrote would be based on true stories or people that he knew-only the plots were fictitious.

By the end of Anderson's life, he had written and illustrated over thirty-five horse books, and had also created covers for the Saturday Evening Post. Anderson is the namesake for Andy's Summer Playhouse, a youth theater in Wilton, New Hampshire. Anderson also was a member of the Society of American Graphic Artists.

== Artwork portfolios ==
- All Thoroughbreds, Harper and Brothers Publishers, 1948 – 20 illustrations
- Post Parade, Harper and Brothers Publishers, 1949 – 15 illustrations
- Turf and Bluegrass, Harper and Brothers Publishers, 1950 and 1952 – 15 illustrations
- Grey, Bay, and Chestnut, Harper and Brothers Publishers 1952 and 1955 – 10 illustrations
- Colts and Champions, Harper and Brothers Publishers, 1955 and 1956 – 10 illustrations
- Accent on Youth, 1958 – 10 illustrations
- Bred to Run, 1960 – 12 illustrations
- The Look of a Thoroughbred, 1963 – 8 illustrations
- Before the Bugle, 1965 - 9 illustrations
- The World of Horses, 1965 – 8 illustrations
- Fillies and Colts, year unknown – 5 illustrations
- Man O'War, Horse of the Century, 1970 – 8 illustrations

== Works ==
=== As author and illustrator ===
- And So to Bed, 1935
- Billy and Blaze, 1936
- Blaze and the Gypsies, 1937
- Blaze and the Forest Fire, 1938
- Black Bay and Chestnut, 1939
- Deep Through the Heart, 1940
- Salute!, 1940
- High Courage, 1941
- Thoroughbreds, 1942
- Big Red, 1943
- Heads Up, Heels Down, 1944
- A Touch of Greatness, 1945
- Tomorrow's Champion, 1946
- Bobcat, 1949
- Post Parade, 1949
- Blaze Finds the Trail, 1950
- Horses Are Folks, 1950
- A Pony for Linda, 1951
- Horse Show, Harper, 1951
- Linda and the Indians, 1952
- Turf and Bluegrass, 1952
- The Crooked Colt, 1954
- The Smashers, 1954
- Blaze and Thunderbolt, 1955
- Colts and Champions, 1956
- The Horse of Hurricane Hill, 1956
- Afraid to Ride, 1957
- Pony for Three, 1958
- Blaze and the Mountain Lion, 1959
- A Filly for Joan, 1960
- Lonesome Little Colt, 1961
- Complete Book of Horses, 1963
- Blaze and the Indian Cave, 1964
- The World of Horses, 1965
- Great Heart, 1965
- Twenty Gallant Horses, 1965
- ''Blaze and the Lost Quarry, 1966
- Another Man o' War, 1966
- C. W. Anderson's Favorite Horse Stories, 1967
- The Outlaw, 1967
- Blaze and the Gray Spotted Pony, 1968
- Blaze Shows the Way, 1969
- Phantom, Son of the Gray Ghost, 1969
- Blaze Finds Forgotten Roads, 1970
- The Rumble Seat Pony, 1971
- The Blind Connemara, 1971

=== As illustrator ===
- The Red Roan Pony by Joseph Wharton Lippincott, 1934.
- Honey the City Bear by Madalena Paltenghi Grosset & Dunpal, 1937.
- Honey on a Raft by Madalena Paltenghi Garden City Press, 1941.
- Rumpus Rabbit by Madalena Paltenghi Harper & Brothers, 1939.
- A Pony Called Lightning by Miriam E. Mason. Macmillan, 1948.
- Midnight, Rodeo Champion by Robert E. Gard, 1951.
- A Horse Named Joe by Robert E. Gard, 1956
