= Wahoo Public Schools =

School district in Nebraska, United States

Wahoo High School

Location
- 2201 North Locust Street; Wahoo, (Saunders County), Nebraska 68066; United States
- Coordinates: 41.225543°N 96.626599°W

Information
- Type: Public high school
- Principal: Vernon Golladay
- Staff: 24.69 (FTE)
- Enrollment: 326 (2023-24)
- Student to teacher ratio: 13.20
- Colors: Blue and gold
- Nickname: Warriors
- Website: Wahoo High School

Wahoo Public Schools is a school district headquartered in Wahoo, Nebraska in the United States of America

As of 2019, Brandon Lavaley is the superintendent. The district has three schools: Wahoo Elementary School, Wahoo Middle School, and Wahoo High School.
