= Félix Hernández's perfect game =

Baseball feat in 2012

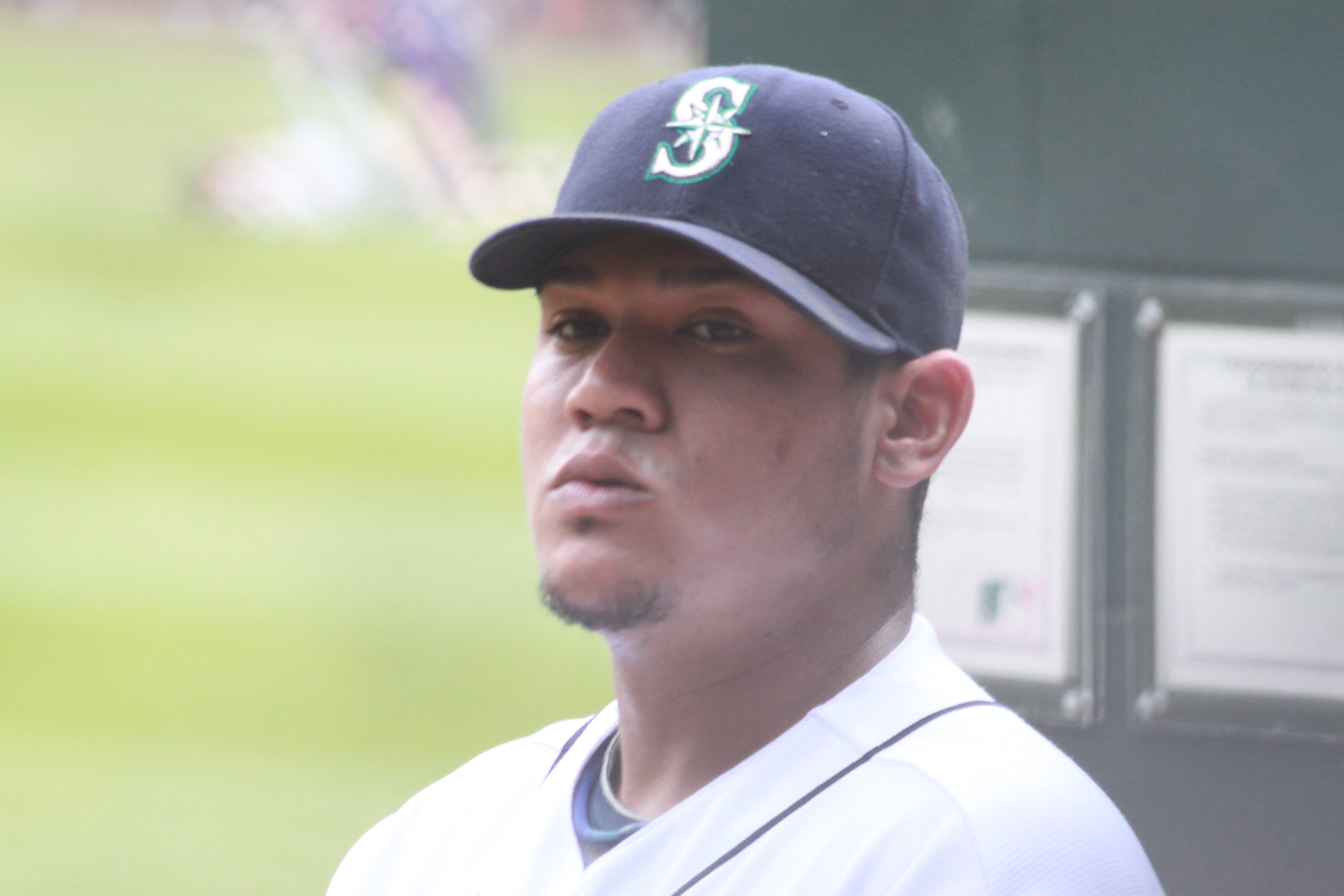
- Félix Hernández in 2010
Tampa Bay Rays	Seattle Mariners
0	1
	1	2	3	4	5	6	7	8	9	R	H	E
Tampa Bay Rays	0	0	0	0	0	0	0	0	0	0	0	1
Seattle Mariners	0	0	1	0	0	0	0	0	x	1	5	0
- Date: August 15, 2012
- Venue: Safeco Field
- City: Seattle, Washington
- Managers: Joe Maddon (Tampa Bay Rays); Eric Wedge (Seattle Mariners)
- Umpires: HP: Rob Drake; 1B: Joe West; 2B: Sam Holbrook; 3B: Andy Fletcher
- Attendance: 21,889
- Television: Root Sports Northwest
- TV announcers: Dave Sims (play-by-play); Dan Wilson (color commentary)
- Radio: KIRO
- Radio announcers: Rick Rizzs (play-by-play); Ken Wilson (color commentary)

On August 15, 2012, Seattle Mariners pitcher Félix Hernández pitched the 23rd perfect game in Major League Baseball (MLB) history and the first in Mariners' franchise history. Pitching to catcher John Jaso against the Tampa Bay Rays at Safeco Field in Seattle, Washington, Hernández retired all 27 batters that he faced and tallied 12 strikeouts in a 1–0 victory.

This was the third perfect game of the 2012 Major League Baseball season. Philip Humber pitched one on April 21, and Matt Cain followed on June 13, marking the first time that three perfect games were thrown in one MLB season. Also, as the Mariners were the losing team in Humber's perfect game, this was the first time that a team was on the losing and winning end of a perfect game in the same season. As Humber's perfect game took place when the White Sox were visiting Safeco Field, this marked the first time two perfect games were thrown in the same park in the same season. It was also the second time in 2012 that the Mariners had pitched a no-hitter at Safeco Field; they pitched a combined no-hitter on June 8, beating the Los Angeles Dodgers, also 1–0, making it the first time that a team pitched a combined no-hitter and complete game no-hitter in the same season. It also marked the third time the Tampa Bay Rays had been on the receiving end of a perfect game in four seasons, having previously failed to reach first base against Dallas Braden in 2010 and Mark Buehrle in 2009. Evan Longoria, Carlos Peña, Melvin Upton, Jr., and Ben Zobrist all played for the Rays in all three games, tying Alfredo Griffin's dubious mark for most losing perfect games played in.

== The game ==
Hernández threw 113 pitches, 77 of them strikes, striking out the side in the sixth and the eighth innings. Jeremy Hellickson, the starting pitcher for Tampa Bay, allowed one run in seven innings on a run batted in single by Jesús Montero in the third inning. Rays manager Joe Maddon was ejected from the game in the seventh inning for arguing a called strike with the home plate umpire Rob Drake.

== Statistics ==
=== Linescore ===
Team	1	2	3	4	5	6	7	8	9	R	H	E
Tampa Bay Rays (63–54)	0	0	0	0	0	0	0	0	0	0	0	1
Seattle Mariners (55–64)	0	0	1	0	0	0	0	0	X	1	5	0
WP: Félix Hernández (11–5) LP: Jeremy Hellickson (7–8)

=== Box score ===
Tampa Bay	AB	R	H	RBI	BB	SO	AVG
Sam Fuld, LF	3	0	0	0	0	0	.262
B. J. Upton, CF	3	0	0	0	0	1	.243
Matt Joyce, RF	3	0	0	0	0	1	.269
Evan Longoria, DH	3	0	0	0	0	2	.297
Ben Zobrist, 2B	3	0	0	0	0	1	.257
Carlos Peña, 1B	3	0	0	0	0	1	.191
Jose Lobaton, C	2	0	0	0	0	1	.228
Desmond Jennings, PH	1	0	0	0	0	1	.254
Elliot Johnson, SS	2	0	0	0	0	2	.245
Jeff Keppinger, PH	1	0	0	0	0	0	.319
Sean Rodriguez, 3B	3	0	0	0	0	2	.206
Totals	27	0	0	0	0	12	.000

FIELDING

- E: Johnson, E (10, fielding).
- DP: Zobrist-Pena, C.

Tampa Bay	IP	H	R	ER	BB	SO	HR	ERA
Jeremy Hellickson (L, 7–8)	7	5	1	1	1	1	0	3.39
Kyle Farnsworth	1	0	0	0	0	1	0	3.95
Totals	8	5	1	1	1	2	0	1.13

Seattle	AB	R	H	RBI	BB	SO	AVG
Dustin Ackley, 2B	4	0	1	0	0	0	.225
Michael Saunders, CF	4	0	0	0	0	0	.237
Jesus Montero, DH	4	0	1	1	0	1	.266
John Jaso, C	3	0	1	0	0	0	.286
Kyle Seager, 3B	3	0	0	0	0	0	.250
Justin Smoak, 1B	3	0	0	0	0	1	.189
Trayvon Robinson, LF	3	0	1	0	0	0	.227
Eric Thames, RF	2	0	0	0	1	0	.234
Brendan Ryan, SS	3	1	1	0	0	0	.199
Totals	29	1	5	1	1	2	.172

BATTING

- 2B: Jaso (14, Hellickson).
- TB: Ryan, B; Montero, J; Jaso 2; Ackley; Robinson, T.
- RBI: Montero, J (46).
- 2-out RBI: Montero, J.
- Runners left in scoring position, 2 out: Thames; Seager, K.
- Team RISP: 1-for-3.
- Team LOB: 5.

BASERUNNING

- SB: Ryan, B (9, 2nd base off Hellickson/Lobaton).

Seattle	IP	H	R	ER	BB	SO	HR	ERA
Félix Hernández (W, 11–5)	9	0	0	0	0	12	0	2.60
Totals	9	0	0	0	0	12	0	0.00

=== Other info ===
- LP: Hellickson.
- Pitches-strikes: Hellickson 115–73; Farnsworth 15–9; Hernández, F 113–77.
- Groundouts-flyouts: Hellickson 10–5; Farnsworth 0–1; Hernández, F 8–5.
- Batters faced: Hellickson 27; Farnsworth 3; Hernández, F 27.
- Ejections: Rays manager Joe Maddon (by HP umpire Rob Drake, 7th inning).
- Umpires: HP: Rob Drake; 1B: Joe West; 2B: Sam Holbrook; 3B: Andy Fletcher.
- Weather: 79 °F (26 °C), sunny.
- Wind: 4 mph, in from CF.
- Time: 2:22.
- Attendance: 21,889.
- Venue: Safeco Field.

== See also ==
- List of Major League Baseball perfect games
- List of Major League Baseball no-hitters
