= Late Show Top Ten List =

Television program segment

The Top Ten List was a regular segment of the television programs Late Night with David Letterman and the Late Show with David Letterman. Each night, host David Letterman would present a list of ten items, compiled by his writing staff, that circulated around a common theme.

The lists were usually given humorous topics such as Top Ten Signs Your Kid Had A Bad First Day At School or Top Ten Rejected James Bond Gadgets. Some were based on current events. Many guests like Adam Sandler or Bill Murray would come into the show to provide the answers. Letterman would also occasionally give an intentionally absurd and mundane category, such as Top Ten Numbers Between One and Ten, drawing humor from the silliness of ranking such items.

== Origin ==
Letterman's top ten skit was thought of when Steve O'Donnell was head writer of the Late Night with David Letterman show. According to O'Donnell, the Top Ten List was an "almost simultaneous inspiration arriving from staffers Jim Downey, Randy Cohen and Robert "Morty" Morton — largely prompted by the ridiculous 'eligible bachelor' lists in a local New York paper that included the 84-year-old Bill Paley. 'Why, we can put such nonsense together ourselves!' we exclaimed. And we did."

On September 18, 1985, the very first list, "The Top Ten Words That Almost Rhyme With 'Peas'" was broadcast.

== Presentation ==
U.S. Army soldiers present a Top 10 List on the Late Show in June 2013.

The entries are read by Letterman in reverse countdown order, and are accompanied by a drum roll performed by CBS Orchestra drummer Anton Fig. There are six montages: the pyramids, the athletes (usually used for a sports-themed top ten list), the taxi cabs, the water towers, the sewer covers, and, in time for the 2012 presidential campaign, the campaign trail.

For example, the "top ten signs the government is running out of money" from March 2006 was:

1. State dinners are at IHOP
2. Country renamed United States of ditech.com
3. Had to fire Laura's sexy Dominican gardener
4. Witness Protection Program now issues informants a fake mustache
5. For ten bucks you can punch Rumsfeld in the stomach
6. Bush's awkward call to Mrs Milosevic asking if he's in Slobodan's will
7. The original Constitution is on eBay
8. NSA can only afford to tap phones during off-peak hours
9. Price of a stamp is now two grand
10. Cheney was spotted strolling into a bank carrying his 12-gauge

The conclusion of the list is then followed by a brief performance by the band, usually a pop song relating to the topic of the list in some way.

Occasionally, the list is given by a guest presenter (such as John Malkovich reading "Ten Things That Sound Creepy When Said by John Malkovich" or Casey Kasem reading the recurring category "Top Ten Numbers Between One and Ten", or Dale Earnhardt "Top Ten Reasons It Took Me 20 Years To Win The Daytona 500"). At times, the list has also been given by a series of presenters, with each providing one entry; for example, the list for "Ten Things I've Always Wanted to Say to Dave", was used for Letterman's final show in 2015 and included entries from Alec Baldwin, Barbara Walters, Steve Martin, Jerry Seinfeld, Jim Carrey, Chris Rock, Julia Louis-Dreyfus, Peyton Manning, Tina Fey and Bill Murray.

Four animated characters have recited a Top Ten list on the show: Homer Simpson (4 times), Peter Griffin, Stewie Griffin and Optimus Prime.

Occasionally a twist was added, sometimes an alteration of the nature of the list itself. One notable example occurred on November 27, 2001. Introduced as "Top Ten Ways Osama bin Laden Can Improve His Image", the list consisted of only one entry: "#10. There's no way he can improve his image. He's a murdering, soul-less asshole."

A common source of confusion regarding the Top Ten List is why the #1 entry is usually seen as the least funny. This even inspired the Late Show to run a pre-taped bit in 1998, humorously exploring the apparent mystery, and to mention it again on December 29, 1999, when the list "Top Ten Phrases That Were Not Spoken This Millennium", included the #1 entry of, "Why is the number one always so damn funny?" Writer Bill Scheft confirmed this in a 2007 interview on Costas on the Radio, stating that the writers use the three funniest entries on #10 (to start the list strong), #6, (which usually accompanies an on-screen slide change), and #2 (the last opportunity for a laugh before the completion of the bit).

== The switch from NBC to CBS ==
Before Letterman's departure for CBS, NBC had insisted that the "Top Ten List" was the intellectual property of the network and demanded that it not be used on his new show; Letterman rebutted that the mere act of listing things, which does not reach a threshold of originality under intellectual property laws, was not something that could be claimed by NBC or himself. A loose compromise was reached where it would be renamed the "Late Show Top Ten", although Letterman would soon simply refer to it once again as the "Top Ten List", with no repercussions.

The only significant modifications in the Late Show years were the elimination of mentioning a "home office" (such as Wahoo, Nebraska), and the addition of a computer-animated introduction and closing as well as background graphics.

== Home offices ==
Cities that were the supposed source of the Top 10 lists:

- Milwaukee, Wisconsin (The first Late Night with David Letterman home office)
- Scottsdale, Arizona (–1990)
- Lebanon, Pennsylvania (1990–1992)
- Tahlequah, Oklahoma (1992–)
- Oneonta, New York (May 7, 1993 – June 25, 1993; The last office from the Late Night with David Letterman show)
- Sioux City, Iowa (August 30, 1993 – June 9, 1995; Was a home office primarily to make fun of its CBS television station KMEG, who refused to air Late Show with David Letterman for months after it debuted in 1993.)
- Grand Rapids, Michigan (June 12, 1995 – May 2, 1996)
- Wahoo, Nebraska (May 3, 1996–late 1990s) Wahoo became a home office after the town lobbied Letterman for the status for months after Letterman mentioned that he liked the word "Wahoo"; it would remain the home office until Letterman phased out the "home office" concept in the late 1990s.

Other home offices:

- Kankakee, Illinois (Used during David Letterman's Chicago shows in 1994)
- Liverpool, England (Used during David Letterman's London shows in 1995)
- Daly City, California (Used during David Letterman's San Francisco shows in 1996)
- Lincoln, Nebraska
- Omaha, Nebraska
- Oklahoma City, Oklahoma

== Books ==
David Letterman's Book of Top Ten Lists and Zesty Lo-Cal Chicken Recipes
- Author: David Letterman and the writers of the Late Show with David Letterman
- Language: English
- Genre: Comedy
- Publisher: Bantam Books
- Publication date: 1995
- Publication place: United States
- Media type: Hardcover; Paperback
- Pages: 165
- ISBN: 978-0-553-10222-2
- OCLC: 32894022
- Dewey Decimal: 818/.540208 20
- LC Class: PN6162 .L377 1995

David Letterman and the Late Show writers have released four volumes of Top Ten Lists through CBS book publisher, Pocket Books. The first two volumes were originally released in hardcover and later mass-market paperback editions while the latter two editions only had hardcover releases.

- The "Late Night with David Letterman" Book of Top Ten Lists (1990).
- Roman Numeral Two!! An Altogether New Book of Top Ten Lists from "Late Night with David Letterman" (1991).
- David Letterman's Book of Top Ten Lists and Zesty Lo-Cal Chicken Recipes. (1995).
- David Letterman's NEW Book of Top Ten Lists and Wedding Patterns for the Husky Bride (1996).

== Radio usage ==
For nearly two decades each Top Ten list was packaged into a nationally syndicated radio feature, distributed by Westwood One for use the following morning. Following shows from which the list was omitted, or if Letterman was on vacation, the feature would utilize a list from the archives. The feature was often edited for time, and occasionally edited for content which may have been appropriate for late-night television, but not morning radio.

In late 2013 Westwood One informed "Top 10" affiliates that it was ceasing distribution of the feature. The last Top 10 list for radio aired Friday, January 3, 2014. No other radio network picked up the feature for the rest of the television show's run.

== Allusions ==
Letterman's presentation of the 67th Academy Awards in 1995 included the "Top Ten Signs the Movie You're Watching Will Not Win an Academy Award".

The television cartoon Garfield & Friends referenced the feature with an episode entitled Top Ten, where Garfield presents Top Ten lists on various topics ranging from "How to Tell When Garfield is Full", and "Why Jon Arbuckle Will Never Have a Date", to "Why the House will Never Get Robbed". The Buddy Bears provide the accompanying music.
