= Billy and Blaze =

1936 children's book

- 1936 Macmillan edition
- Author: Clarence William Anderson
- Illustrator: Clarence William Anderson
- Cover artist: Anderson
- Language: English
- Series: Billy and Blaze
- Genre: Children's book
- Publisher: Collier Books, Later, Macmillan, Later Aladdin Paperbacks
- Publication date: 1936
- Publication place: United States
- Media type: Print (paperback)
- ISBN: 0-689-71608-7
- OCLC: 24247447
- Dewey Decimal: [E] 20
- LC Class: PZ7.A524 Bi 1992
- Followed by: Blaze and the Gypsies

Billy and Blaze is a children's picture book that was written and illustrated in 1936 by Clarence William Anderson. Published by MacMillian Books, it is the first of a series of eleven books and is Anderson's most well known work. The book is about a little boy, Billy, and his pony, Blaze, who he receives as a birthday gift in this book. The adventures of Billy and Blaze revolved around proper care of the horse, while teaching a lesson. Anderson would go to great lengths to give accurate information. Some other titles in the series are Blaze and the Gypsies, Blaze and the Forest Fire, and Blaze Finds the Way. All of the titles in the series included full-page illustrations and easy to read text.

== Books in the series ==
A complete list of the books in the series and the publication dates is as follows:

- Billy and Blaze (1936)
- Blaze and the Gypsies (1937)
- Blaze and the Forest Fire (1938)
- Blaze Finds the Trail (1950)
- Blaze and Thunderbolt (1955)
- Blaze and the Mountain Lion (1959)
- Blaze and the Indian Cave (1964)
- Blaze and the Lost Quarry (1966)
- Blaze and the Gray Spotted Pony (1968)
- Blaze Shows the Way (1969)
- Blaze Finds Forgotten Roads (1970)
