= Brendan Ryan (baseball) =

American baseball player (born 1982)

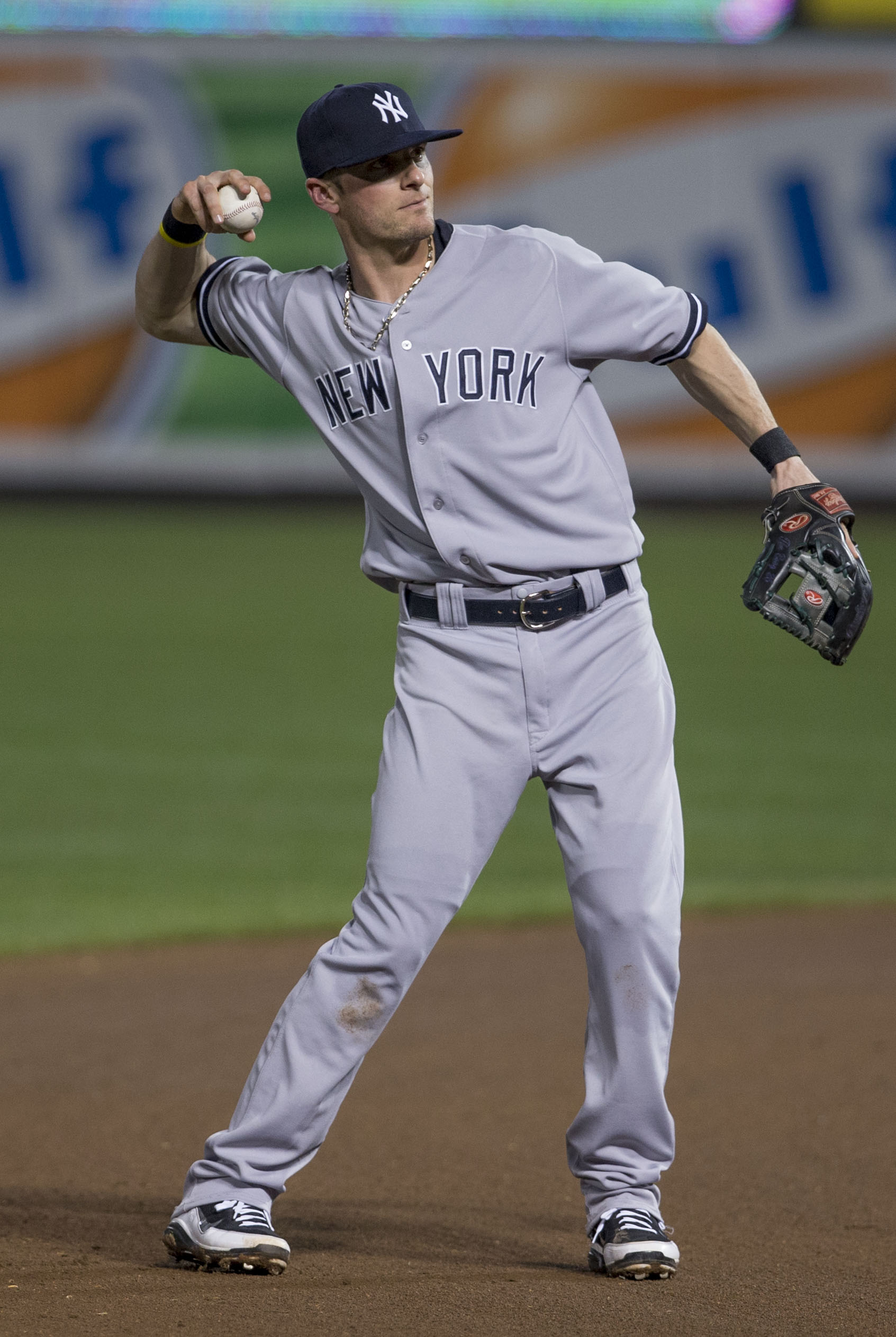
- Ryan with the New York Yankees in 2013
- Shortstop
- Born: March 26, 1982 (age 44); Los Angeles, California, U.S.
- Batted: Right Threw: Right

MLB debut
- June 2, 2007, for the St. Louis Cardinals

Last MLB appearance
- June 14, 2016, for the Los Angeles Angels of Anaheim

MLB statistics
- Batting average: .233
- Home runs: 19
- Runs batted in: 203
- Stats at Baseball Reference

Teams
- St. Louis Cardinals (2007–2010); Seattle Mariners (2011–2013); New York Yankees (2013–2015); Los Angeles Angels (2016)

Brendan Wood Ryan (born March 26, 1982) is an American former professional baseball infielder. He played 10 seasons in Major League Baseball (MLB) for the St. Louis Cardinals, Seattle Mariners, New York Yankees, and Los Angeles Angels.

Ryan was primarily a shortstop but was a versatile defender who made professional appearances at every position but catcher. The 2012 winner of the Fielding Bible Award, Ryan had a reputation as one of the best defensive players in baseball.

== Amateur career ==
Ryan attended Notre Dame High School in Sherman Oaks, California.

In the fall of 2000, Ryan enrolled at Lewis–Clark State College to play college baseball in the National Association of Intercollegiate Athletics. In his first season, he batted .375 with five triples, the third-most ever by a Warrior. As a sophomore shortstop, he hit .359 with 34 RBIs and hit .378 with runners on. During the 2002 season, he hit safely in 18 straight games. Ryan had a reputation as a good defensive infielder. He was regularly disciplined by head coach Ed Cheff and removed from the team in 2003.

In the summer of 2002, Ryan played collegiate summer baseball for the Alaska Goldpanners of Fairbanks in the Alaska Baseball League.

== Professional career ==
=== St. Louis Cardinals ===
==== Draft and minor leagues (2003–2007) ====
The St. Louis Cardinals selected Ryan in the seventh round of the 2003 MLB draft. He hit .311 for the Cardinals' rookie league affiliate, the New Jersey Cardinals, in 2003. In 2004, he was promoted to the Class A Peoria Chiefs. With a .322 batting average and 30 steals in the 2004 season, another promotion came for Ryan, this time to the High A Palm Beach Cardinals, where Ryan was selected as a Florida State League All-Star. He was promoted again during the middle of 2005 season to the Double-A Springfield Cardinals.

In 2006, Ryan suffered a wrist injury in spring training limiting him to 28 games spread among four stops in the minors. That same year, Ryan appeared in 28 games for the Peoria Saguaros in the Arizona Fall League and batted .310 (39-for-126) with two home runs, 19 runs and 20 RBI. His 39 hits were tied for tops for the 2006 AFL season. He collected two four-hit games and hit safely in his first eight AFL games (.425 BA) and 10 of his first 11 (.396).

==== Major leagues (2007–2010) ====
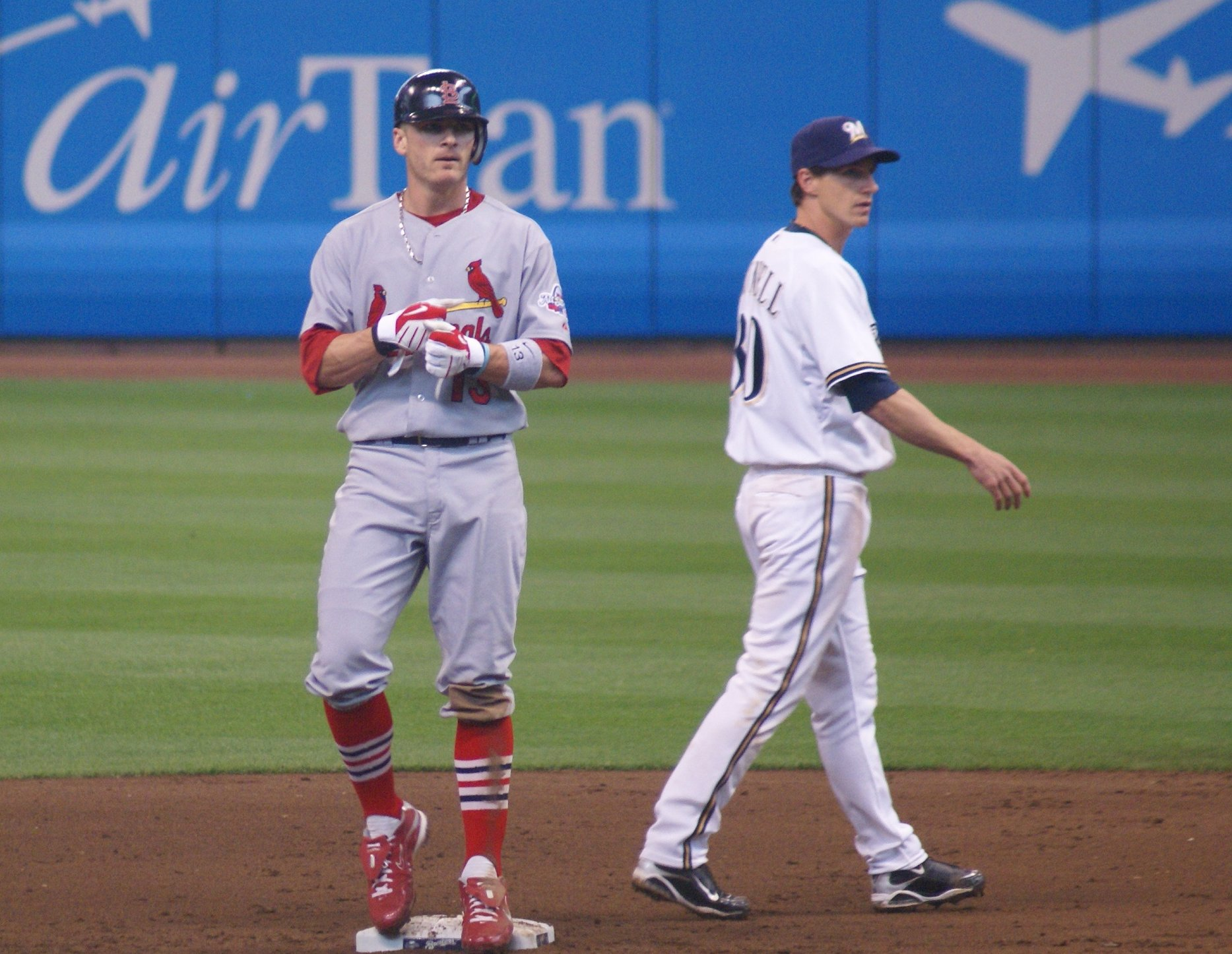
Ryan (left) with the 2007 St. Louis Cardinals

Ryan made his major league debut for the Cardinals on June 2, 2007 against the Houston Astros. He was later sent down on July 27, but was recalled on August 12, and remained with the Cardinals for the rest of the season. In his rookie year, he hit for a .289 batting average with 4 home runs and 11 runs batted in. Ryan also scored 29 runs and recorded 7 stolen bases without being caught stealing. He batted significantly better against left-handed pitching in his first season with a batting average of .354, as opposed to his .232 average against right-handers. His first major league home run was a game-winner in the top of the 11th inning off of Scott Schoeneweis of the New York Mets on June 26. His second home run also came rather dramatically, as he contributed to a four-run comeback on July 4. The Cardinals won the game 5–4 against the Arizona Diamondbacks.

Ryan opened the 2008 season on the 15-day disabled list with a right oblique strain suffered in spring training. He rehabbed injury in the minor leagues in the first month of the season until called up on April 23. He was the Cardinals' primary utility infielder for most of the season, although he played three games in the outfield. He was optioned to Memphis on August 6 and recalled again on September 2.

Ryan started the 2009 season in St. Louis. He went on the 15-day disabled from April 30 through May 15 with a left hamstring strain, making a rehab stint in Memphis. By June, he moved up to be the everyday shortstop, batting over .300 and playing spectacular defense. On August 20, Ryan hit his first career grand slam off of San Diego Padres pitcher Tim Stauffer. On September 19, Ryan hit a walk-off single off Chicago Cubs closer Carlos Mármol, his first game-ending hit in the majors. Ryan also had a home run in the 2–1 win.

By the end of the 2009 regular season, Ryan's defense at shortstop had been recognized as a major factor in the Cardinals' National League Central division title. However, in February 2010, he underwent a procedure to debride dead tissue from his right wrist performed by Dr. Steven Shin in Los Angeles. The start to his 2010 spring training debut was delayed due to the surgery. He made his 2010 Grapefruit League debut on March 20, but he showed no lingering effects. He batted .223 in his final season in St. Louis.

=== Seattle Mariners ===
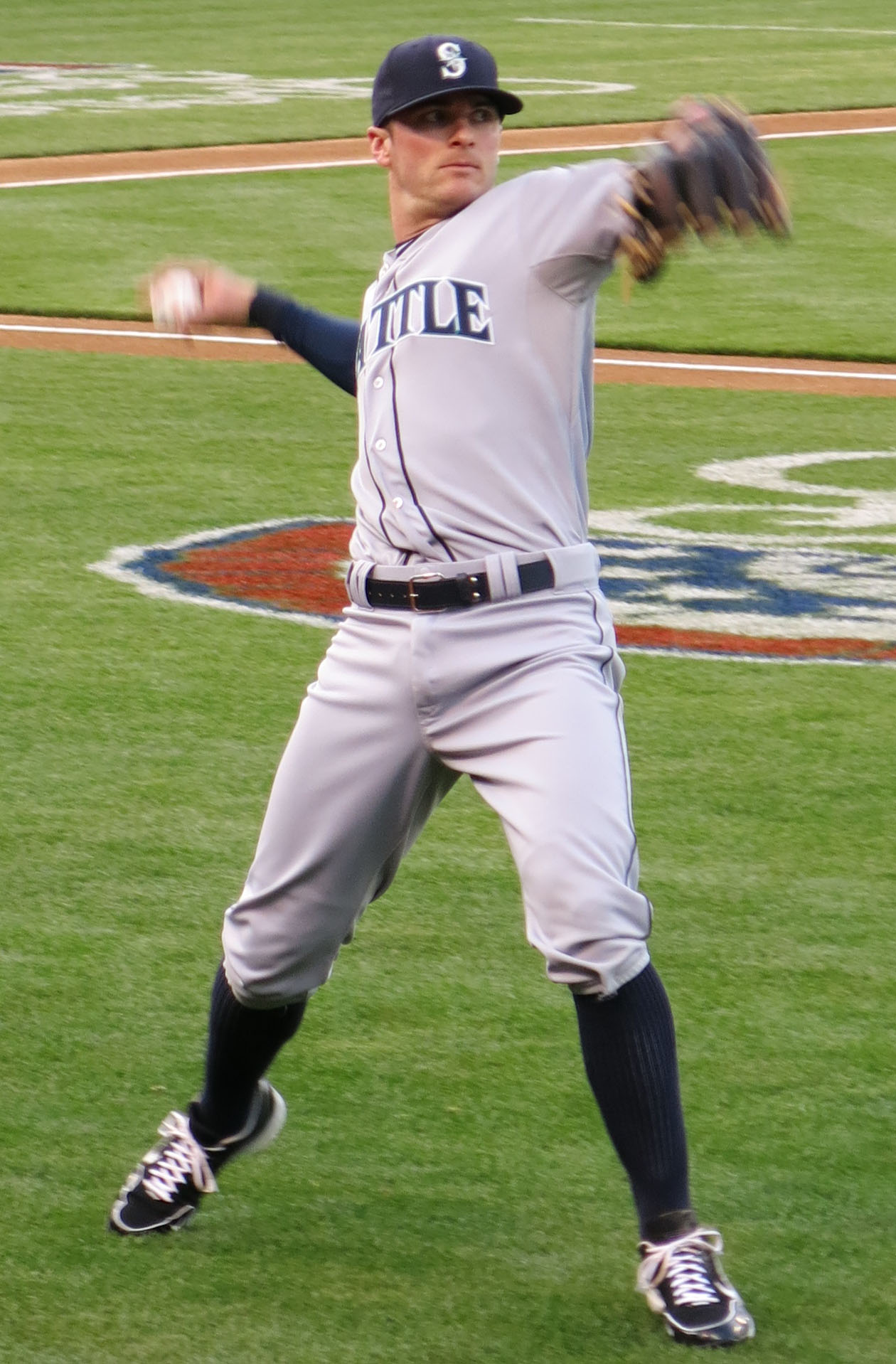
Ryan with the Seattle Mariners in 2013.

On December 12, 2010, Ryan was traded to the Seattle Mariners for pitcher Maikel Cleto.

On July 26, 2011, Ryan broke up CC Sabathia's bid for a perfect game with a base hit with one out in the seventh inning. On August 2, during a game against the Oakland Athletics, alert play by Ryan led to the unusual result of his reaching third base on an infield hit. Ryan hit a ground ball fielded by Oakland shortstop Eric Sogard, but Sogard's off-balance throw to first base was late. Behind the back of Oakland first baseman Conor Jackson, Ryan ran for second which was left uncovered by Sogard, and then immediately for third base, which was also uncovered. While referred to in the media as an "infield triple", the play was officially scored as a single and fielder's choice. In 2011, Ryan finished second for the second consecutive year in the voting for the Fielding Bible Award, behind Troy Tulowitzki. Ryan was also one of the most successful baserunners at advancing from first base to third base.

On April 21, 2012, Ryan was the final out of Philip Humber's perfect game. He was called for a swinging third strike on a checked swing, though the ball was not caught cleanly. Rather than running to first base, Ryan momentarily argued umpire Brian Runge's decision that he had swung, allowing catcher A. J. Pierzynski to throw the ball to first base for the final out. On June 8, Ryan entered as a defensive replacement in the ninth inning of the Mariners' combined no-hitter against the Los Angeles Dodgers and made one of the game's closest putouts, throwing Dee Gordon out at first base. On August 15, Ryan scored the game's only run in the third inning of Félix Hernández's perfect game as the Mariners defeating the Tampa Bay Rays, 1–0. In 2012, Ryan won a Fielding Bible Award as the best fielding shortstop in MLB.

Ryan was replaced during the 2013 season as the starting shortstop by Brad Miller mid-season, as Ryan had been hitting around the Mendoza Line.

=== New York Yankees ===
On September 10, 2013, Ryan was traded to the New York Yankees for a player to be named later. On November 18, he agreed to a new contract with the Yankees, and on November 27, he finalized a two-year, $5 million deal that included a club option for $2 million and a player option for $1 million for the 2016 season.

Ryan opened the 2014 season on the 15-day disabled list with back issues. On May 2, he was on the 15-day disabled list with cervical spine nerve damage and was playing rehab games at Double-A Trenton. Ryan played only 49 games in 2014, batting .167 with 8 RBI.

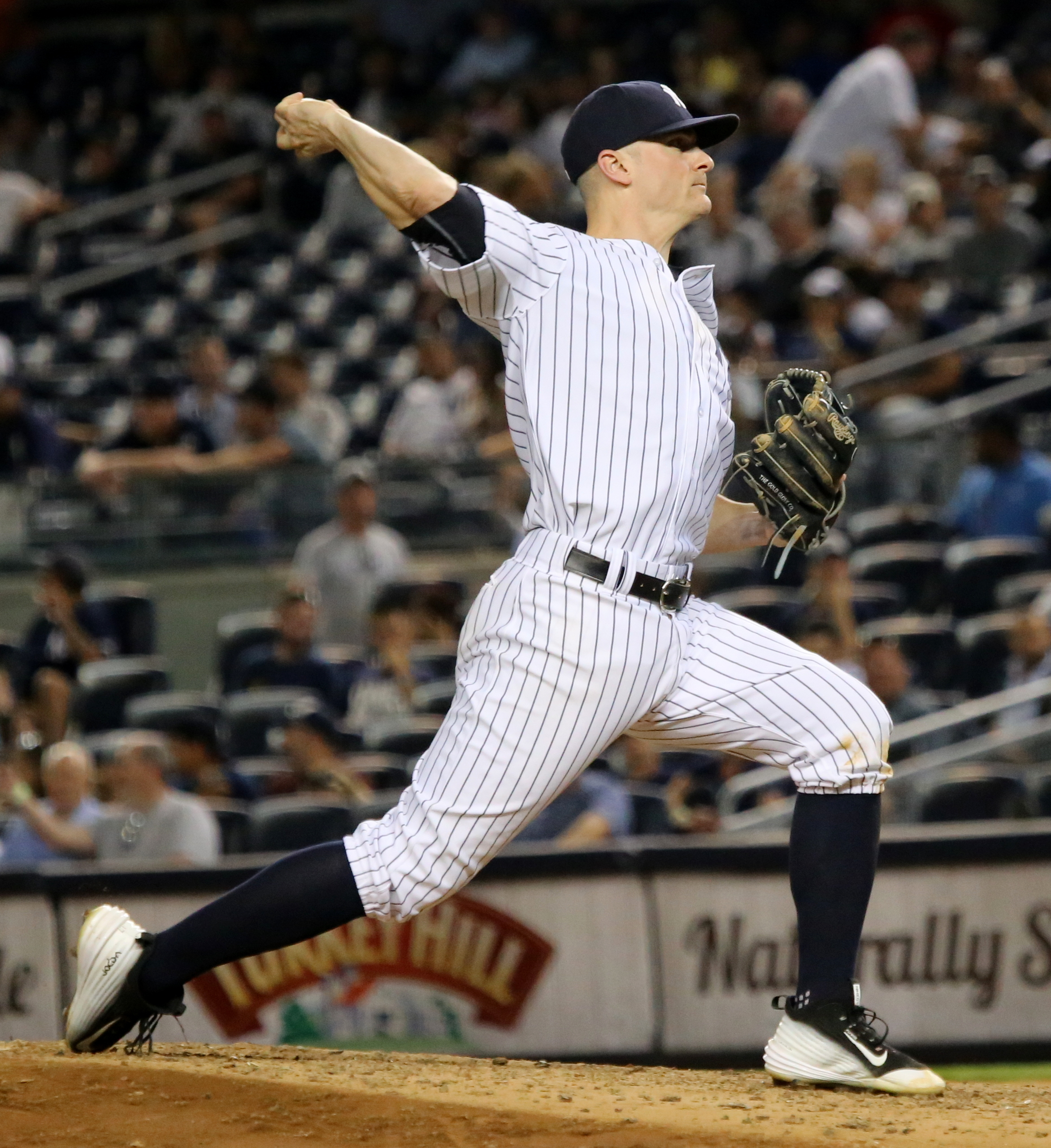
Ryan's pitching debut for the Yankees in 2015

Ryan began the 2015 season on the 15-day disabled list due to a right calf strain. On August 25, 2015, Ryan made his MLB pitching debut in the eighth inning against the Houston Astros, throwing two scoreless innings.

Ryan exercised his $1 million player option for the 2016 season.

On December 17, 2015, the Yankees announced that Ryan had been the player to be named later in their trade with the Chicago Cubs for shortstop Starlin Castro. The Cubs released him on December 23.

=== Washington Nationals ===
On February 2, 2016, the Washington Nationals signed Ryan to a minor league contract with an invitation to spring training. He did not make the team but accepted an assignment to the Syracuse Chiefs of the Triple-A International League.

=== Los Angeles Angels ===
Following an injury to Andrelton Simmons, Ryan was traded to the Los Angeles Angels of Anaheim for cash considerations and a player to be named later on May 10, 2016. He was designated for assignment on May 28 then was called back up on June 1.

=== Detroit Tigers ===
On December 19, 2016, Ryan signed a minor league deal with the Detroit Tigers, worth $625,000, which included an invite to spring training. He spent the 2017 season with the Triple-A Toledo Mud Hens, playing in 112 games and hitting .236/.324/.326 with 4 home runs and 28 RBI. He elected free agency following the season on November 6.

== Personal life ==
Ryan is married and has two children. They reside in Miracle Mile, Los Angeles.

Ryan is the youngest of the four children. As a child, he was diagnosed with attention deficit disorder, though he said he avoided taking medication due to the side effects. His father, Jim, was an infielder for Loyola Marymount University and holds the school's single-season record for the most hits with a wooden bat. Jim died of complications from chemotherapy in treatment for bladder cancer in 2005. One of his uncles, Willie Ryan, was a first-team All-American first baseman and 1961 College World Series champion with the USC Trojans baseball; his other uncle, Dr. Patrick Ryan, was a college sprinter at UCLA and Michigan State.
