= 2005 World Series =

101st edition of Major League Baseball's championship series

| Team (Wins) | Managers | Season |
|---|---|---|
| Chicago White Sox (4) | Ozzie Guillén | 99–63 (.611), GA: 6 |
| Houston Astros (0) | Phil Garner | 89–73 (.549), GB: 11 |
- Dates: October 22–26
- Venue(s): U.S. Cellular Field (Chicago); Minute Maid Park (Houston)
- MVP: Jermaine Dye (Chicago)
- Umpires: Joe West (crew chief), Jeff Nelson, Jerry Layne, Derryl Cousins, Gary Cederstrom, Ángel Hernández
- Hall of Famers: White Sox: Harold Baines (Bench Coach); Tim Raines (1B Coach); Astros: Jeff Bagwell; Craig Biggio

Broadcast
- Television: Fox (United States); MLB International (International)
- TV announcers: Joe Buck and Tim McCarver (Fox); Dave O'Brien (MLB International)
- Radio: ESPN; WMVP (CHW); KTRH (HOU)
- Radio announcers: Jon Miller and Joe Morgan (ESPN); John Rooney and Ed Farmer (WMVP); Milo Hamilton and Alan Ashby (KTRH)
- ALCS: Chicago White Sox over Los Angeles Angels of Anaheim (4–1)
- NLCS: Houston Astros over St. Louis Cardinals (4–2)

The 2005 World Series was the championship series of Major League Baseball's (MLB) 2005 season. The 101st edition of the World Series, it was a best-of-seven playoff between the American League (AL) champion Chicago White Sox and the National League (NL) champion Houston Astros. The White Sox swept the Astros in four games, winning their third World Series championship and their first in 88 years, ending the Curse of the Black Sox. The series was played between October 22–26, 2005.

Home field advantage was awarded to Chicago by virtue of the AL's 7–5 victory over the NL in the 2005 MLB All-Star Game. The Astros were attempting to become the fourth consecutive wild card team to win the Series, following the Anaheim Angels (2002), Florida Marlins (2003) and Boston Red Sox (2004). Both teams were attempting to overcome decades of disappointment, with a combined 132 years between the two teams without a title. The Astros were making their first Series appearance in 44 years of play, while the White Sox had waited exactly twice as long for a title, having last won the Series in 1917, and had not been in the Series since 1959, three years before the Astros' inaugural season. This was the last postseason series won by the White Sox until 2026. The Astros' appearance also marked the only time they made the World Series as a National League team, as all of their subsequent appearances were achieved as members of the American League.

== Background ==
=== Chicago White Sox ===
The Chicago White Sox finished the regular season with the best record in the American League at 99–63. The 2005 White Sox led their division wire to wire and only lost one game in the postseason. After starting the season on a tear, the White Sox began to fade in August, when a 15 1/2 game lead (for the AL Central division title) fell all the way to 1 1/2 at one point. However, the White Sox were able to hold off the Cleveland Indians to win the American League Central Division by six games, sweeping the Indians in three games on the season's final weekend. In the American League Division Series, the top-seeded White Sox swept the defending champion Boston Red Sox. The American League Championship Series began with the second-seeded Los Angeles Angels of Anaheim winning Game 1, but a controversial uncaught third strike in Game 2 helped the White Sox start a run and win Games 2–5, all on complete games pitched by starters Mark Buehrle, Jon Garland, Freddy García, and José Contreras, clinching their first American League pennant since 1959. In game 3 of the ALDS Orlando Hernandez came in with the bases loaded due to Damaso Marte loading the bases with a single and back to back walks. El Duque came in and induced 2 pop outs and a strike out to end the inning and preserve the lead.

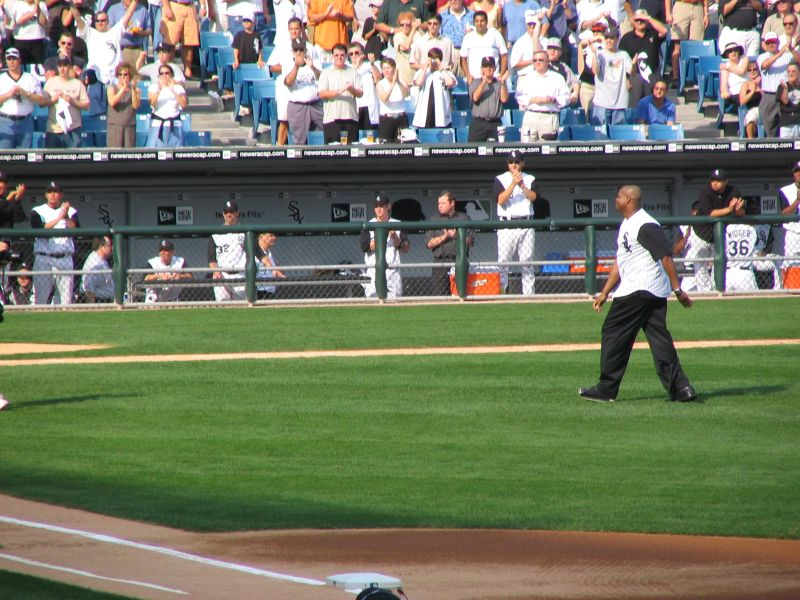
Frank Thomas throws out the ceremonial first pitch of the 2005 ALDS between the White Sox and Red Sox.

Manager Ozzie Guillén then led the White Sox to a World Series victory, their first in 88 years. Slugger Frank Thomas was not on the post-season roster because he was injured, but the team honored his perennial contributions to the franchise during Game 1 of the Division Series against the Red Sox when he was chosen to throw out the ceremonial first pitch. "What a feeling," Thomas said. "Standing all around the place. People really cheering me. I had tears in my eyes. To really know the fans cared that much about me – it was a great feeling. One of my proudest moments in the game."

The White Sox completed the 2005 postseason with an 11-1 record. The White Sox also won the last 5 regular season games and thus closed out the 2005 campaign winning 16 of the last 17 games played and 19 of their last 22 (all 3 losses by just 1 run), a record finish unmatched in all of MLB history.

=== Houston Astros ===
The Houston Astros won the Wild Card for the second straight year, once again clinching it on the final day of the season. The Astros embarked on a memorable National League Division Series rematch against the Atlanta Braves, who were the second seed in the National League. With the Astros in the lead two games to one, the teams played an 18-inning marathon in Game 4, which was the longest (in both time and innings played) postseason game in history. In this game, Roger Clemens made only the second relief appearance of his career, and the first in postseason play. Chris Burke's walk-off home run ended the game in the bottom of the 18th. For the second straight year, the Astros played the top-seeded St. Louis Cardinals in the National League Championship Series. Like the White Sox, the Astros dropped Game 1, but were able to regroup and win Games 2–4. With the Astros on the verge of clinching their first ever National League pennant in Game 5, Albert Pujols hit a mammoth three-run home run off Brad Lidge in the top of the ninth inning to take the lead, and subsequently stave off elimination. However, behind NLCS MVP Roy Oswalt, the Astros were able to defeat the Cardinals 5–1 in Game 6 and earned a trip to the World Series. With the win, this was the Astros' first World Series appearance in franchise history, and the last game played in Busch Stadium II, as it was demolished months after the game and the Cardinals moved to Busch Stadium III the next season.

== Summary ==
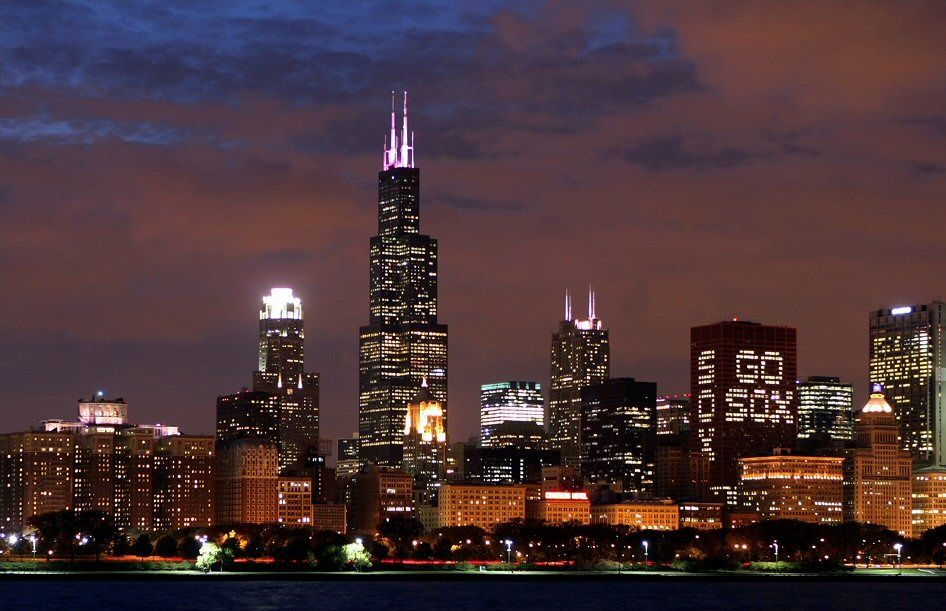
Chicago skyline during the World Series supporting the White Sox

Chicago (AL) won the series, 4–0.

| Game | Date | Score | Location | Time | Attendance |
|---|---|---|---|---|---|
| 1 | October 22 | Houston Astros – 3, Chicago White Sox – 5 | U.S. Cellular Field | 3:13 | 41,206 |
| 2 | October 23 | Houston Astros – 6, Chicago White Sox – 7 | U.S. Cellular Field | 3:11 | 41,432 |
| 3 | October 25 | Chicago White Sox – 7, Houston Astros – 5 (14) | Minute Maid Park | 5:41 | 42,848 |
| 4 | October 26 | Chicago White Sox – 1, Houston Astros – 0 | Minute Maid Park | 3:20 | 42,936 |

== Matchups ==
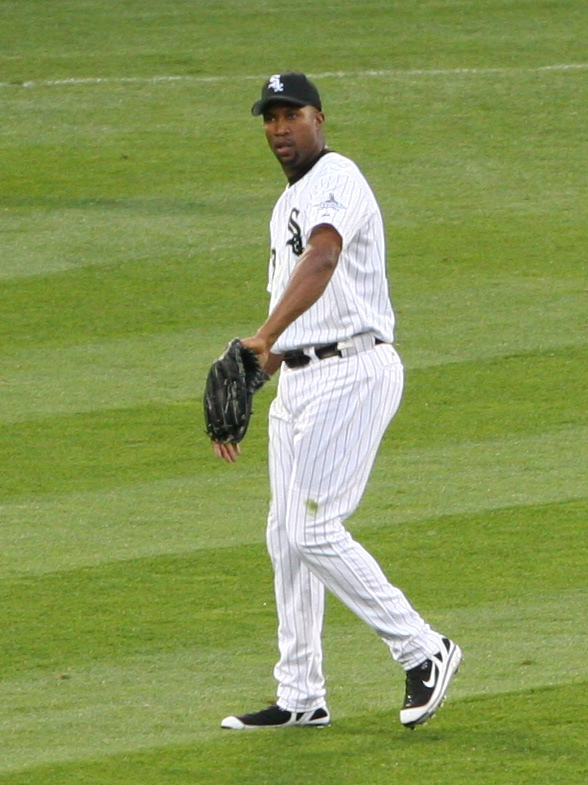
Jermaine Dye hit the first home run of the series.

=== Game 1 ===
October 22, 2005 7:05 pm (CDT) at U.S. Cellular Field in Chicago, Illinois 53 °F (12 °C), overcast
| Team | 1 | 2 | 3 | 4 | 5 | 6 | 7 | 8 | 9 | R | H | E |
|---|---|---|---|---|---|---|---|---|---|---|---|---|
| Houston | 0 | 1 | 2 | 0 | 0 | 0 | 0 | 0 | 0 | 3 | 7 | 1 |
| Chicago | 1 | 2 | 0 | 1 | 0 | 0 | 0 | 1 | X | 5 | 10 | 0 |
WP: José Contreras (1–0) LP: Wandy Rodríguez (0–1) Sv: Bobby Jenks (1); Home runs: HOU: Mike Lamb (1); CWS: Jermaine Dye (1), Joe Crede (1); Attendance: 41,206; Boxscore

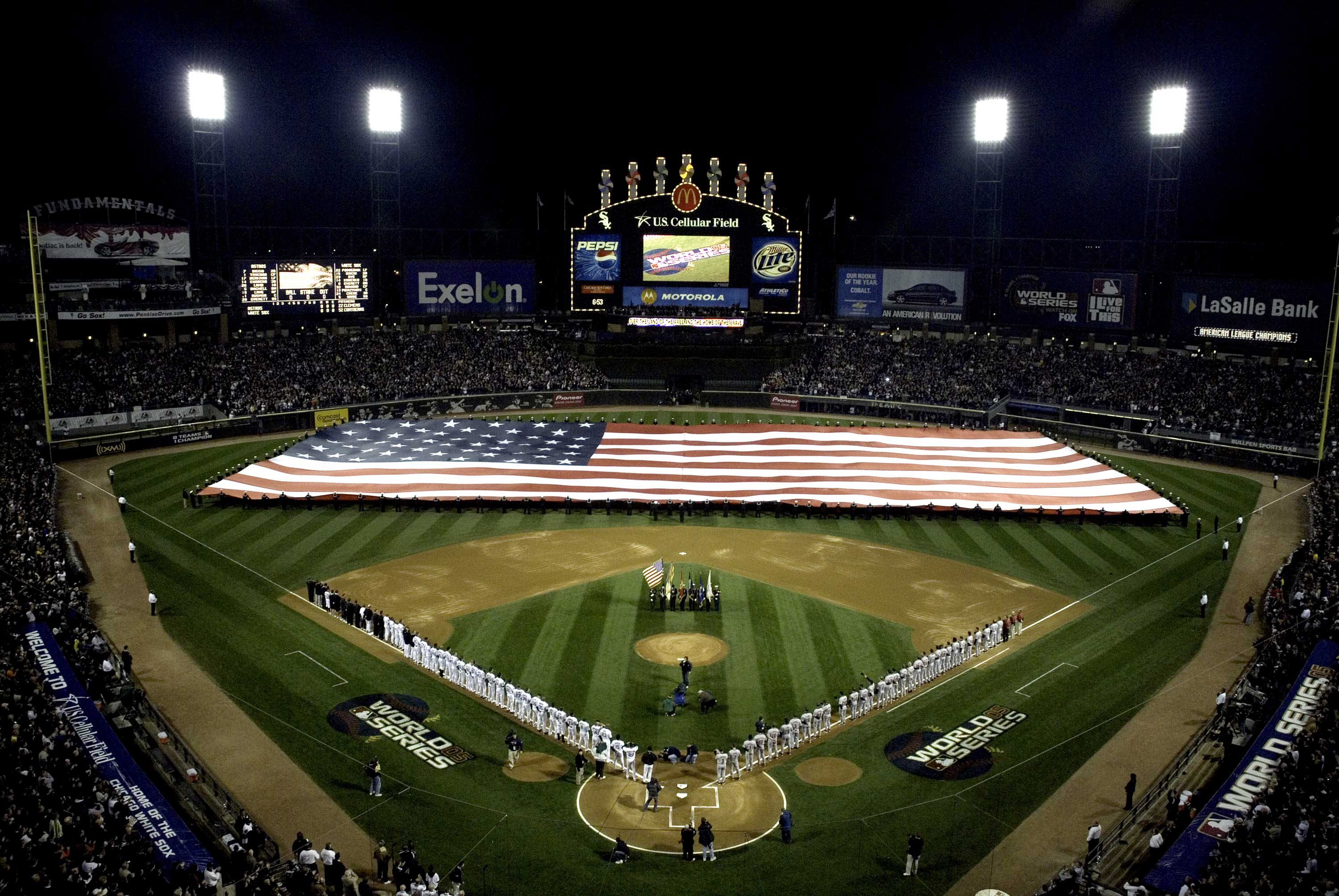
The teams on the field before Game 1.

The national anthem was sung by Josh Groban while "God Bless America" is sung by singer-songwriter Liz Phair. Playing in their first World Series home game since 1959, the White Sox took an early lead with a home run from Jermaine Dye in the first inning. After Mike Lamb's home run tied the game in the second, the Sox scored two more in the second when Juan Uribe doubled in A. J. Pierzynski after Carl Everett had already scored on a groundout earlier in the inning. The Astros responded in the next inning when Lance Berkman hit a double, driving in Adam Everett and Craig Biggio. In the White Sox half of the fourth, Joe Crede hit what turned out to be the game-winning home run. In the bottom of the eighth, Scott Podsednik hit a triple with Pierzynski on second off of Russ Springer for an insurance run. Roger Clemens recorded his shortest World Series start, leaving after the second inning with 53 pitches, including 35 for strikes, due to a sore hamstring that he had previously injured (which had caused him to also miss his last regular season start) as the loss went to Wandy Rodríguez. José Contreras pitched seven innings, allowing three runs on six hits for the win. Before exiting, Contreras allowed a leadoff double by Willie Taveras with no outs. Neal Cotts entered the game in the top of the eighth inning. It marked the first time in five games that the White Sox had gone to their bullpen. Cotts pitched 2/3 innings before Bobby Jenks was called upon by manager Ozzie Guillén to relieve him. Guillen signaled for the large pitcher by holding his arms out wide and then up high. In the postgame conference, the Sox manager joked that he wanted to be clear he was asking for "The Big Boy." Jenks returned in the ninth to earn the save, giving the White Sox a 1–0 lead in the series.

Following the 2025 conclave, the game also became noted for the attendance of Robert Francis Prevost, a White Sox fan, South Side native, and the future Pope Leo XIV, who was a prior for the Order of Saint Augustine at the time and briefly appeared in a crowd shot during Fox's broadcast in the top of the 9th inning. Within weeks of the conclave, a mural of Leo XIV was installed at Rate Field, and the seat he used was also later marked with a plaque. In June 2026, Pierzynski, while visiting the Vatican, gifted the ball from the final out to Leo XIV.

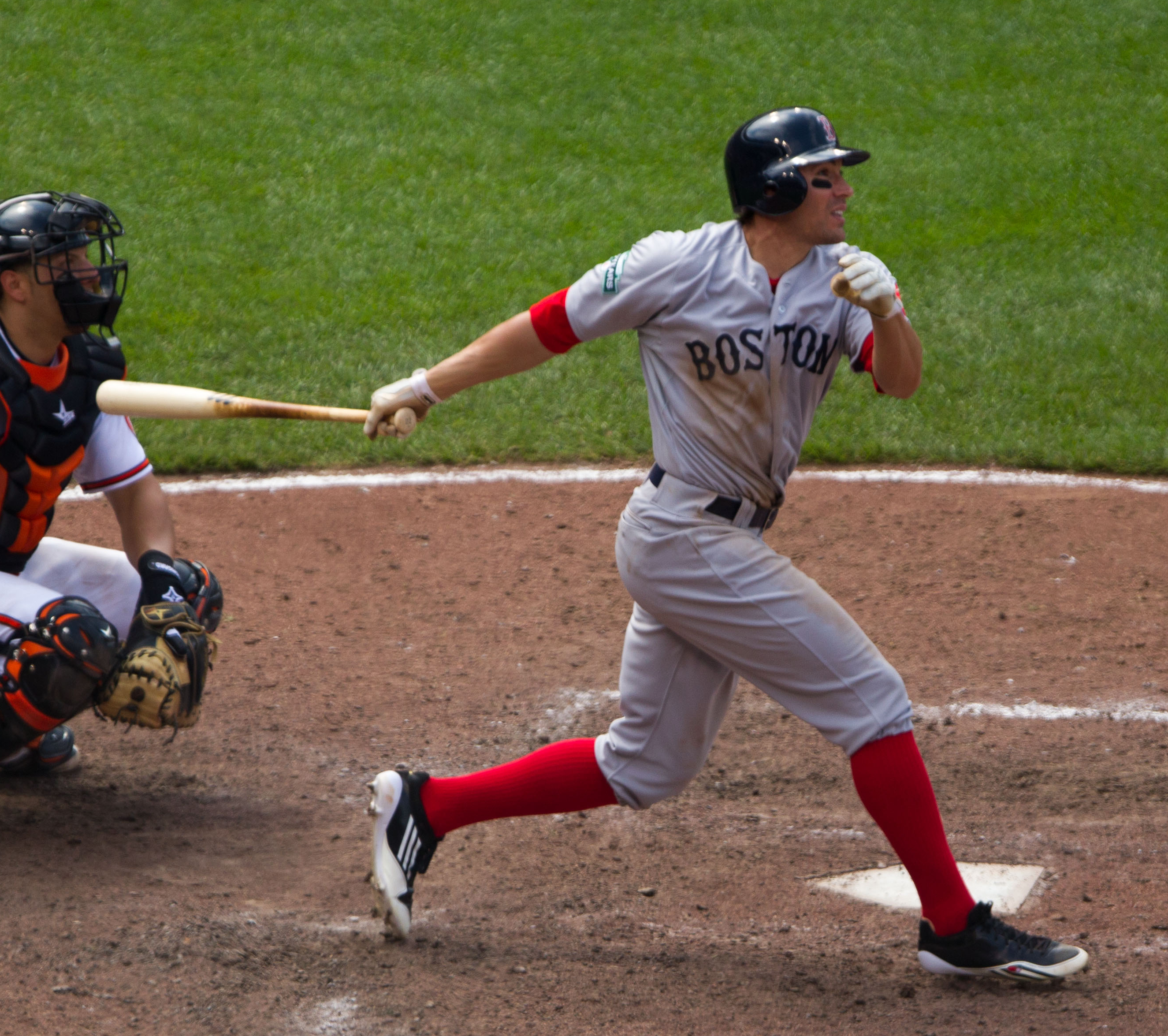
Scott Podsednik, whose walk-off solo home run in the ninth inning helped put the White Sox up two games to none

=== Game 2 ===
October 23, 2005 7:16 pm (CDT) at U.S. Cellular Field in Chicago, Illinois 45 °F (7 °C), rain
| Team | 1 | 2 | 3 | 4 | 5 | 6 | 7 | 8 | 9 | R | H | E |
|---|---|---|---|---|---|---|---|---|---|---|---|---|
| Houston | 0 | 1 | 1 | 0 | 2 | 0 | 0 | 0 | 2 | 6 | 9 | 0 |
| Chicago | 0 | 2 | 0 | 0 | 0 | 0 | 4 | 0 | 1 | 7 | 12 | 0 |
WP: Neal Cotts (1–0) LP: Brad Lidge (0–1); Home runs: HOU: Morgan Ensberg (1); CWS: Paul Konerko (1), Scott Podsednik (1); Attendance: 41,432; Boxscore

The national anthem was sung by Lou Rawls, marking his final performance before his death in 2006 while Chris Botti performed "God Bless America". On a cold (51 °F (11 °C)) and rainy evening, Morgan Ensberg's first-pitch home run off starter Mark Buehrle put the Astros on top in the second inning. The White Sox answered in the bottom of the second with two runs off Andy Pettitte on Joe Crede's RBI single with two on and Juan Uribe's sacrifice fly, the only runs Pettitte allowed in six solid innings. Houston's Lance Berkman tied the game on a sacrifice fly in the third after a one-out triple by Willy Taveras, then hit a two-run double in the fifth to give the Astros a 4–2 lead. In the seventh, Dan Wheeler loaded the bases with a double by Juan Uribe, a walk to Tadahito Iguchi, and plate umpire Jeff Nelson's ruling that Jermaine Dye was hit by a pitched ball. The Astros brought in Chad Qualls, who promptly served up a grand slam to Paul Konerko on his first pitch, the 18th grand slam in the annals of the Fall Classic. In the top of the ninth, Sox closer Bobby Jenks blew the save on a game-tying pinch-hit two-run single by José Vizcaíno. In the bottom of the ninth, Astros closer Brad Lidge gave up a one-out, walk-off home run—the 14th in Series history—to Scott Podsednik, giving Lidge his second loss in as many post-season appearances (his previous appearance was in Game 5 of 2005 National League Championship Series). Podsednik had not hit a single homer in the regular season, but this was his second of the post-season. This was the second time in World Series history where a grand slam and a walk-off home run were hit in the same game. The Oakland A's Jose Canseco (grand slam) and the Los Angeles Dodgers' Kirk Gibson (walk-off) in Game 1 of the 1988 World Series were the first to do it. Never before had a World Series grand slam and a World Series walk-off home run been hit by the same team in the same game. Until the grand slam by Adam Duvall of the Atlanta Braves in 2021 World Series, the grand slam by Konerko was the last World Series grand slam hit by the home team.

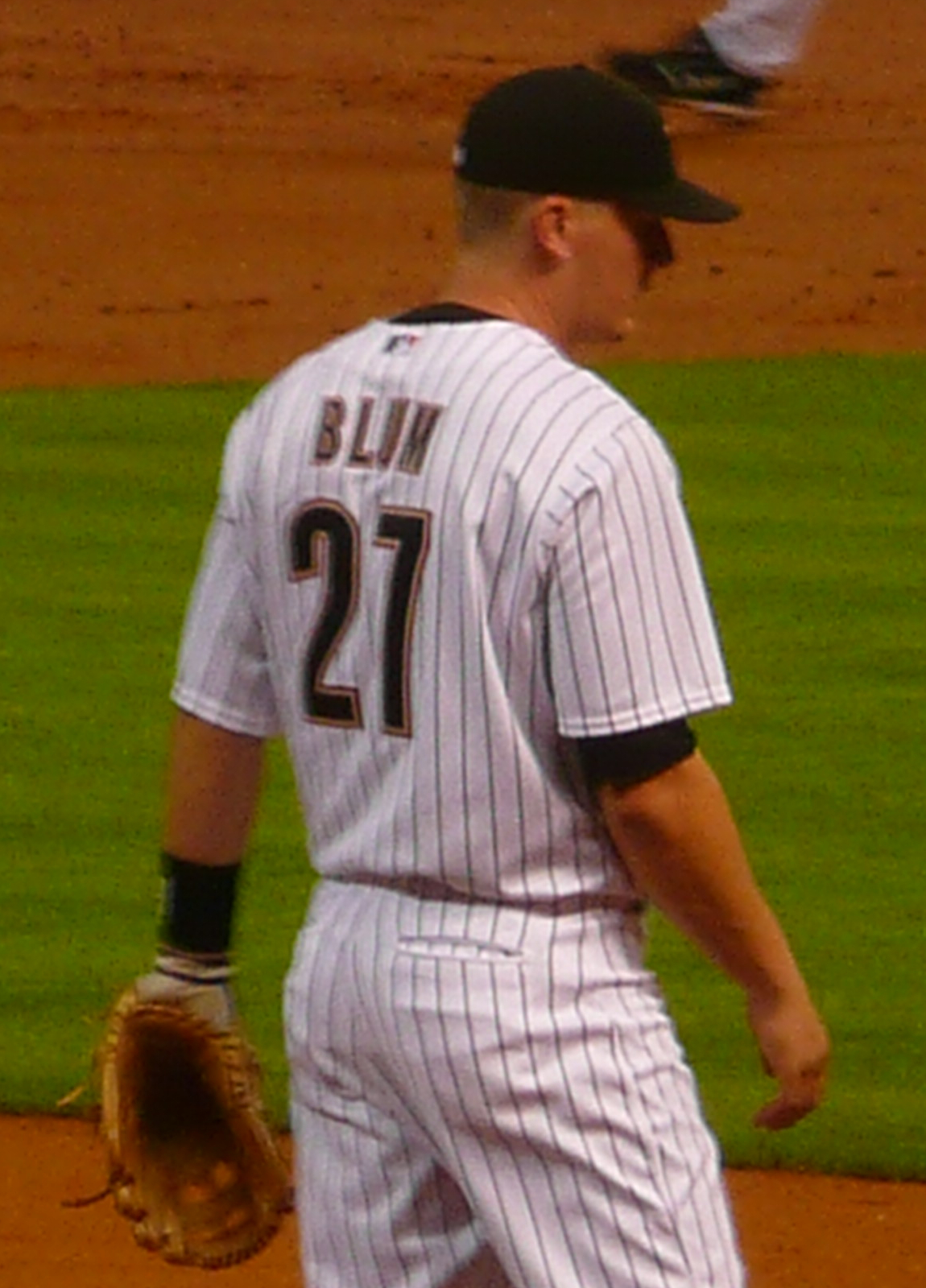
Geoff Blum, playing against his former team, hit a go-ahead solo home run in the fourteenth inning of Game 3 that put the White Sox ahead for good.

=== Game 3 ===
October 25, 2005 7:39 pm (CDT) at Minute Maid Park in Houston, Texas 61 °F (16 °C), roof open, clear
| Team | 1 | 2 | 3 | 4 | 5 | 6 | 7 | 8 | 9 | 10 | 11 | 12 | 13 | 14 | R | H | E |
|---|---|---|---|---|---|---|---|---|---|---|---|---|---|---|---|---|---|
| Chicago | 0 | 0 | 0 | 0 | 5 | 0 | 0 | 0 | 0 | 0 | 0 | 0 | 0 | 2 | 7 | 14 | 3 |
| Houston | 1 | 0 | 2 | 1 | 0 | 0 | 0 | 1 | 0 | 0 | 0 | 0 | 0 | 0 | 5 | 8 | 1 |
WP: Dámaso Marte (1–0) LP: Ezequiel Astacio (0–1) Sv: Mark Buehrle (1); Home runs: CWS: Joe Crede (2), Geoff Blum (1); HOU: Jason Lane (1); Attendance: 42,848; Boxscore

Game 3 was the first World Series game played in the state of Texas. Before the game, it was ruled by Commissioner Bud Selig that the retractable roof would be open at Minute Maid Park, weather permitting. The Astros objected, citing that their record in games with the roof closed was better than with the retractable roof open. Selig's office claimed that the ruling was based on the rules established by Houston and were consistent with how the Astros organization treated the situation all year long, as well as the weather forecasts for that period of time. Michael McDonald sang the national anthem while Aaron Neville sang "God Bless America".

The game would become the longest World Series game in length of time (5 hours and 41 minutes) and tied for the longest in number of innings (14, tied with Game 2 of the 1916 World Series and Game 1 of the 2015 World Series) until it was surpassed by Game 3 of the 2018 World Series. Houston struck early on a Lance Berkman single after a Craig Biggio lead-off double in the bottom of the first off Chicago starter Jon Garland. A White Sox rally was snuffed in the second inning; after Paul Konerko hit a leadoff double and A. J. Pierzynski walked, Aaron Rowand lined out into a double play. Houston scored in the third; Adam Everett walked, was caught in a rundown and got hit by the ball on a Juan Uribe throwing error, then scored on a Roy Oswalt sacrifice bunt and a Biggio single. Two batters later, Morgan Ensberg singled Biggio home. Jason Lane led off the Astros' fourth with a home run to left-center field. It was later shown in replays that the ball should not have been ruled a home run, hitting to the left of the yellow line on the unusual wall in left-center field.

After Houston starter Roy Oswalt had thrown four shutout innings, the White Sox rallied for five runs in the top of the fifth, true to their "Win Or Die Trying" mantra of 2005, starting with a Joe Crede lead-off homer. Uribe, on first after hitting a single, scored on a Tadahito Iguchi base hit with one out, followed by Scott Podsednik coming home on a single by Jermaine Dye. Pierzynski hit a two-out double to Tal's Hill, driving in two runs, scoring Iguchi and Dye giving the Sox the lead. The Astros rallied in the last of the eighth when the Sox bullpen collapsed. Cliff Politte got two outs, but walked Ensberg and was replaced by Neal Cotts, who promptly walked Mike Lamb to put two on and forced the Sox to put their regular-season closer Dustin Hermanson in place of Cotts. However, Hermanson could not hold down the save when Lane doubled to score Ensberg, but did not allow many more runs by striking out Brad Ausmus. Houston tried to rally to win in the ninth against Orlando Hernandez, but stranded Chris Burke at third, after he had walked, reached second on an error and stolen third.

The Astros tried again in the 10th as well as in the 11th, but failed each time. In the top of the 14th, after the Sox hit into a spectacular double play started by Ensberg, Geoff Blum (a former Astro and the Astros' television color analyst as of 2015), who had entered the game in the 13th, homered to right with two outs and saddled Astros reliever Ezequiel Astacio with the loss. The White Sox then put men on first and second thanks to singles by Rowand and Crede, and a subsequent walk to Uribe loaded the bases for Chris Widger, who walked to force home Rowand and padded the White Sox' lead to 7–5. Astacio was yanked after Widger's at-bat and was replaced by Game 1 loser Wandy Rodriguez, who got the final out to prevent any further damage. Trailing by two runs, Houston tried to rally with the tying runs on first and third and two outs after a Uribe error. Game 2 starter Mark Buehrle earned the save for winning pitcher Dámaso Marte when Everett popped out, bringing Chicago one game closer to its first championship in 88 years. Buehrle became the first pitcher to start a game in the Series and save the next one since Bob Turley of the Yankees in the 1958 World Series.

Many records were set or tied besides time and innings: The teams combined to use 17 pitchers (nine for the White Sox, eight for the Astros), throwing a total of 482 pitches, and walking 21 batters (a dozen by Chicago, nine by Houston); 43 players were used (the White Sox used 22 and the Astros used 21), and 30 men were left on base (15 for each team), all new high-water marks in Fall Classic history. Scott Podsednik set a new all-time record with eight official at-bats in this game. One tied record was total double plays, with six (four by the Astros, two by the White Sox).

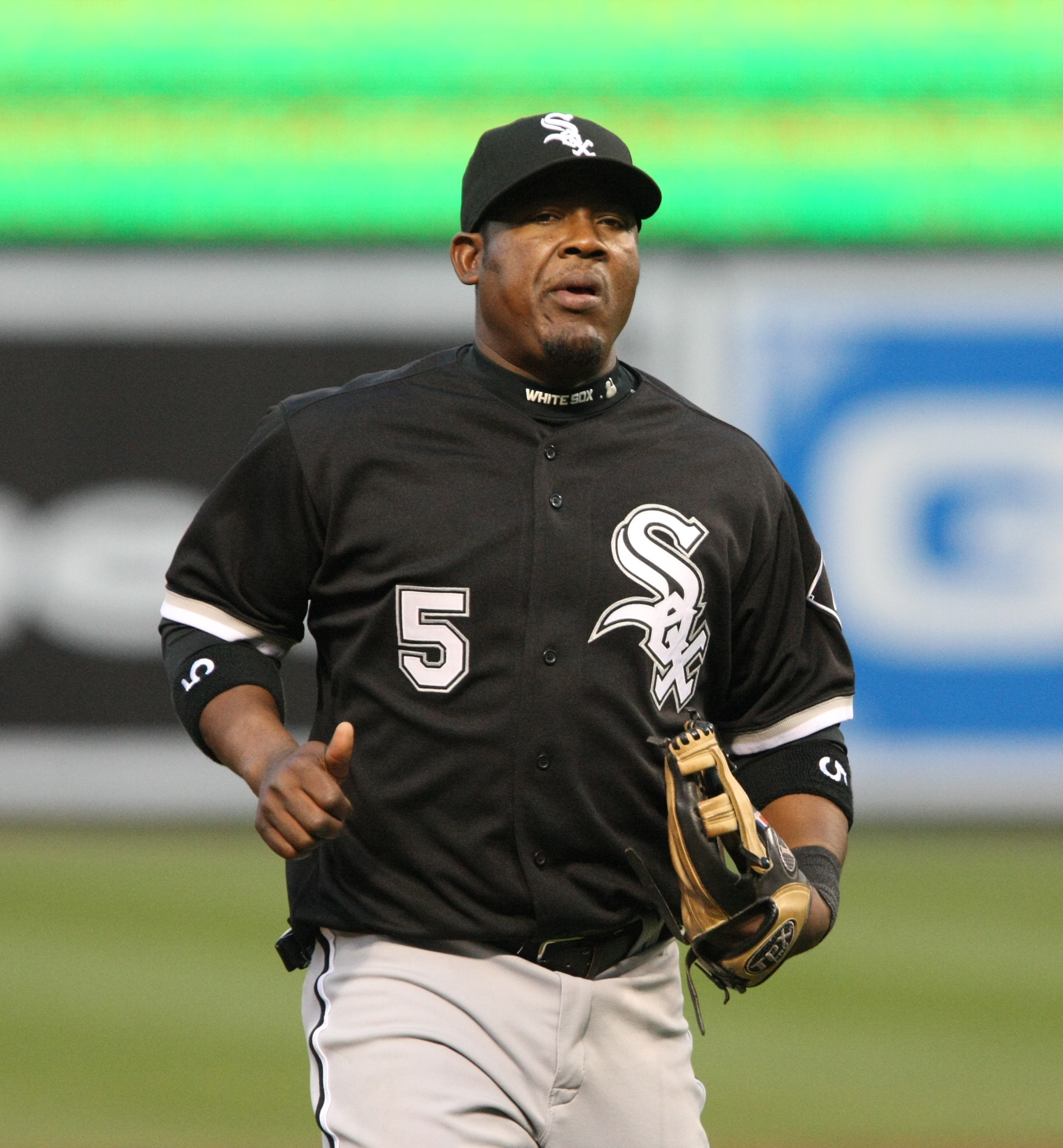
Juan Uribe made two spectacular outs in the bottom of the ninth inning to complete a sweep of the Astros and clinch the South Side's first World Series title in 88 years.

=== Game 4 ===
October 26, 2005 7:41 pm (CDT) at Minute Maid Park in Houston, Texas 65 °F (18 °C), roof open, cloudy
| Team | 1 | 2 | 3 | 4 | 5 | 6 | 7 | 8 | 9 | R | H | E |
|---|---|---|---|---|---|---|---|---|---|---|---|---|
| Chicago | 0 | 0 | 0 | 0 | 0 | 0 | 0 | 1 | 0 | 1 | 8 | 0 |
| Houston | 0 | 0 | 0 | 0 | 0 | 0 | 0 | 0 | 0 | 0 | 5 | 0 |
WP: Freddy García (1–0) LP: Brad Lidge (0–2) Sv: Bobby Jenks (2); Attendance: 42,936; Boxscore

Before the game, Major League Baseball unveiled its Latino Legends Team presented by Chevrolet while Jon Secada sang the national anthem. Country singer Lyle Lovett sang "God Bless America".

The fourth game was the pitchers' duel that had been promised throughout the series. Both Houston starter Brandon Backe and Chicago starter Freddy García put zeros on the scoreboard through seven innings, the longest Series scoreless stretch since Game 7 of the 1991 World Series. Scott Podsednik had a two-out triple in the top of the third, but a Tadahito Iguchi groundout ended that threat. The Astros wasted a chance in the sixth, Jason Lane striking out with the bases loaded. The White Sox in the top of the seventh put runners at second and third, but Backe struck out shortstop Juan Uribe. Chicago broke through in the next inning against embattled Houston closer Brad Lidge, who relieved Backe. Willie Harris hit a pinch-hit single. Podsednik advanced him with a sacrifice bunt. Carl Everett pinch-hit for Iguchi and grounded out to the right side to allow Harris to move to third. Jermaine Dye, the Most Valuable Player of the series, had the game-winning single, driving in Harris.

Things got a little sticky for the Sox in the Astros half of the eighth when reliever Cliff Politte hit Willy Taveras, threw a wild pitch, sending Taveras to second, and walked Lance Berkman. After Morgan Ensberg flew out to center, the White Sox manager Ozzie Guillén brought in Neal Cotts to finish the inning. Cotts induced pinch-hitter José Vizcaíno into a ground out to Uribe. Bobby Jenks, the 24-year-old fireballer, started the ninth inning. He allowed a single to Jason Lane and a sacrifice bunt to Brad Ausmus. Chris Burke came in to pinch-hit; he fouled one off to the left side, but Uribe made an amazing catch in the stands to retire Burke.

The game ended when pinch-hitter Orlando Palmeiro grounded to Uribe to strand Lane. It was a bang-bang play as Paul Konerko caught the ball from Uribe at 11:01 pm CDT to begin the biggest celebration in Chicago since the sixth NBA championship by the Bulls, co-owned with the White Sox, in 1998. As a result, Jerry Reinsdorf, owner of both teams, had won seven championships overall.

This game would be the last postseason game for the Astros as a member of the NL, as they would move to the AL in 2013, and not appear in a postseason game until the 2015 American League Wild Card Game. They also became the only team in the MLB to win both the National and American League pennant after they defeated the New York Yankees in the 2017 ALCS.

The last two Series games technically ended on the same day, Game 3 having concluded after midnight, Houston time.

The 1–0 shutout was the first game with a total of one run scored to end a World Series since the 1995 World Series, in which Game 6 was won by the Atlanta Braves over the Cleveland Indians, and the first 1–0 game in any Series game since Game 5 of the 1996 World Series when the New York Yankees shut-out the Braves in the last game ever played at Atlanta–Fulton County Stadium.

The 2005 White Sox joined the 1995 Atlanta Braves and 1999 New York Yankees as the only teams to win a World Series after losing no more than one game combined in the Division Series and Championship Series. They also became the third team in history to lead their division the entire year and sweep the opposition in the World Series, joining the 1927 New York Yankees and the 1990 Cincinnati Reds.

This was the second consecutive World Series to be won by a team that has the word "Sox" in its nickname, after the Boston Red Sox won the 2004 World Series against the St. Louis Cardinals. This also happened in 1917 and 1918. Furthermore, it was the second year in a row in which the Series champions broke a long-lived "curse." In one of those ways that patterns appear to emerge in sporting events, the White Sox World Series win in 2005, along with the Boston Red Sox win in 2004, symmetrically bookended the two teams' previous World Series winners and the long gaps between, with the Red Sox and White Sox last Series wins having come in 1918 and 1917, respectively.

== Composite line score ==
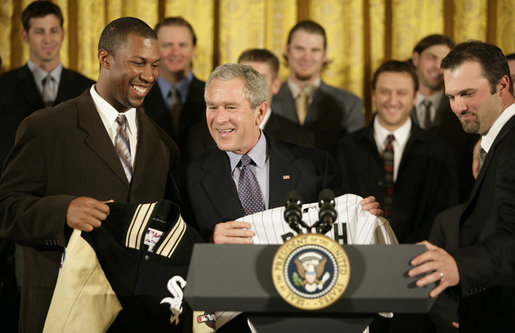
Victorious White Sox players being honored at the White House by President George W. Bush.

2005 World Series (4–0): Chicago White Sox (A.L.) over Houston Astros (N.L.)

| Team | 1 | 2 | 3 | 4 | 5 | 6 | 7 | 8 | 9 | 10 | 11 | 12 | 13 | 14 | R | H | E |
|---|---|---|---|---|---|---|---|---|---|---|---|---|---|---|---|---|---|
| Chicago White Sox | 1 | 4 | 0 | 1 | 5 | 0 | 4 | 2 | 1 | 0 | 0 | 0 | 0 | 2 | 20 | 44 | 3 |
| Houston Astros | 1 | 2 | 5 | 1 | 2 | 0 | 0 | 1 | 2 | 0 | 0 | 0 | 0 | 0 | 14 | 29 | 2 |
Total attendance: 168,422 Average attendance: 42,106; Winning player's share: $324,533 Losing player's share: $191,985

The winning margin of six runs tied for the lowest for a four-game sweep; the only other time was in 1950.

== Media ==
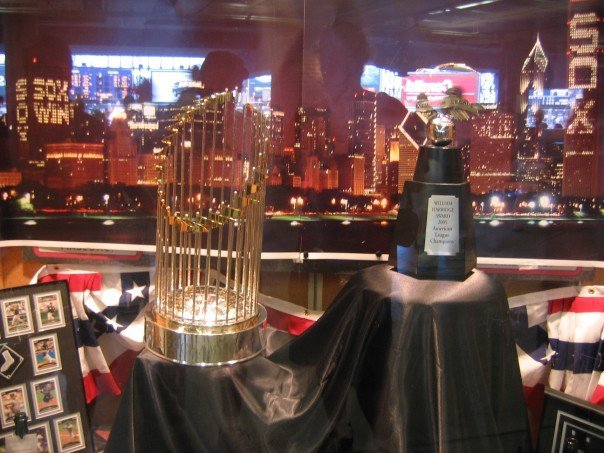
U.S. Cellular Field

As per their contract, Fox Sports carried the World Series on United States television. Joe Buck provided play-by-play for his eighth World Series while analyst Tim McCarver worked his sixteenth.

ESPN Radio was the nationwide radio broadcaster, as it had been since 1998. Jon Miller and Joe Morgan provided the play-by-play and analysis. Stirring minor controversy, ESPN has, on at least two occasions, publicly failed to acknowledge the White Sox as the 2005 World Series champions.

Locally, KTRH-AM and WMVP were the primary carriers for the World Series in the Houston and Chicago markets. For KTRH long time Astros voice Milo Hamilton provided play-by-play while John Rooney called the games for the White Sox. Game 4 was Rooney's last call after 17 years as the radio voice of the White Sox, as he left to take the same position with the St. Louis Cardinals. The Cardinals proceeded to win the 2006 World Series, making Rooney the first home announcer to call back-to-back World Series wins for two teams. That the teams were in two leagues makes the feat even more unusual.

== Ratings ==
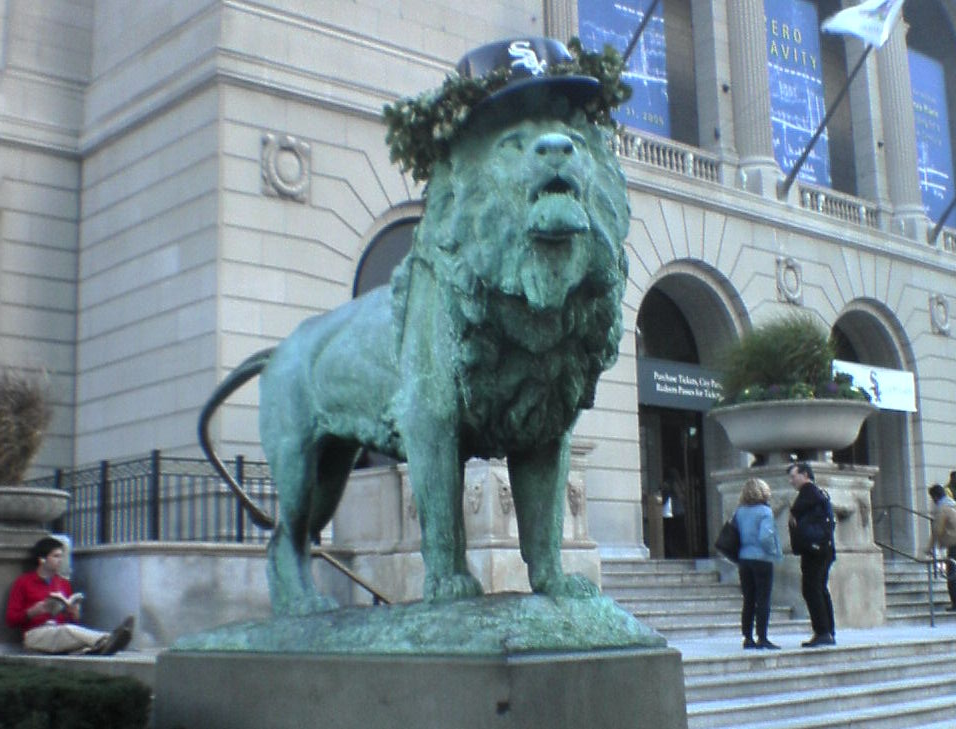
One of the two lion sculptures outside of the Art Institute of Chicago decorated to celebrate the White Sox

The ratings for the 2005 World Series were considered weak.

With an overall average of 11.1, 2005 set a record for the lowest rated World Series of all-time. The prior lowest was 11.9, set by the 2002 World Series between the San Francisco Giants and the Anaheim Angels (importantly, this series went 7 games, and the 2005 World Series went 4).

Following the 2005 World Series, however, every subsequent World Series through 2013 except for 2009 produced lower ratings. The record-low 2012 World Series, another four-game sweep, averaged 7.6 (3.5 points lower than 2005's rating) and 12.7 million viewers (4.4 million fewer viewers than 2005).

| Game | Ratings (households) | Share (households) | American audience (in millions) |
|---|---|---|---|
| 1 | 9.5 | 17 | 15.0 |
| 2 | 11.1 | 17 | 17.19 |
| 3 | 11.0 | 21 | 16.65 |
| 4 | 13.0 | 21 | 19.98 |

== Aftermath ==
Neither team advanced to the postseason in 2006, but both the White Sox and the Astros were in the Wild Card race until the final weeks of the season, with the White Sox finishing with 90 wins, the Astros with 82 wins. The White Sox made their first post-2005 postseason appearance in 2008, while the Astros never returned to the postseason until 2015, their third season as an American League team. Both teams would meet again in the 2021 American League Division Series, their first match-up in the postseason since the 2005 World Series (and the first since the Astros moved to the AL). Houston won the series 3–1. The two teams continued to be linked together as they met in the 2026 Wild Card Series, which the White Sox won to give them their first postseason series win since the 2005 World Series.

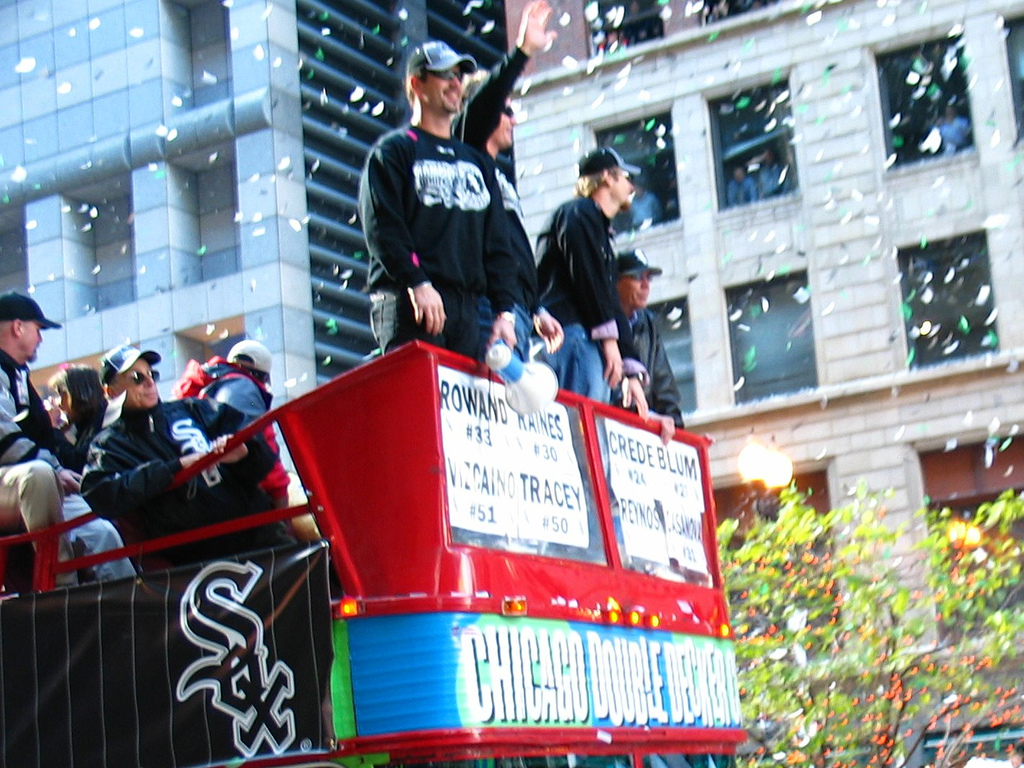
October 28, 2005 Parade

This was the city of Chicago's first professional sports championship since the Chicago Fire won MLS Cup '98 (which came four months after the Chicago Bulls' sixth NBA championship that year). The next major Chicago sports championship came in 2010, when the NHL's Chicago Blackhawks ended a 49-year Stanley Cup title drought. With the Chicago Bears' win in Super Bowl XX and the Chicago Cubs' own World Series championship in 2016, all Chicago sports teams have won at least one major championship since 1985. However, the White Sox would only make three postseason appearances since their 2005 championship (2008, 2020, 2021). When the Cubs made their 2016 World Series appearance, several media outlets forgot to include the White Sox 2005 World Series victory when listing Chicago's previous professional sports championships.

Meanwhile, the Astros themselves made it back to the World Series in 2017, but this time as an AL team, where they defeated the Los Angeles Dodgers in seven games, resulting in Houston's first professional sports championship since the 2006–07 Houston Dynamo won their back-to-back MLS Championships.

Closer Brad Lidge and utility player Eric Bruntlett went on to play on the Philadelphia Phillies' 2008 World Series-winning team, while outfielder/first baseman Lance Berkman won a World Series in 2011 with the St. Louis Cardinals. Aaron Rowand and Juan Uribe both won a second World Series title together as members of the 2010 San Francisco Giants.

On May 8, 2025, the day he was elected pope, it was discovered that Pope Leo XIV (known at the time as Robert Prevost) was in attendance at one of the White Sox home games. On the following day, it was revealed that he could be seen during the broadcast of the ninth inning of game one.

== See also ==
- 2005 Asia Series
- 2005 Japan Series
- List of World Series sweeps
- Curse of the Black Sox
