= Doug Eddings =

American baseball umpire (born 1968)

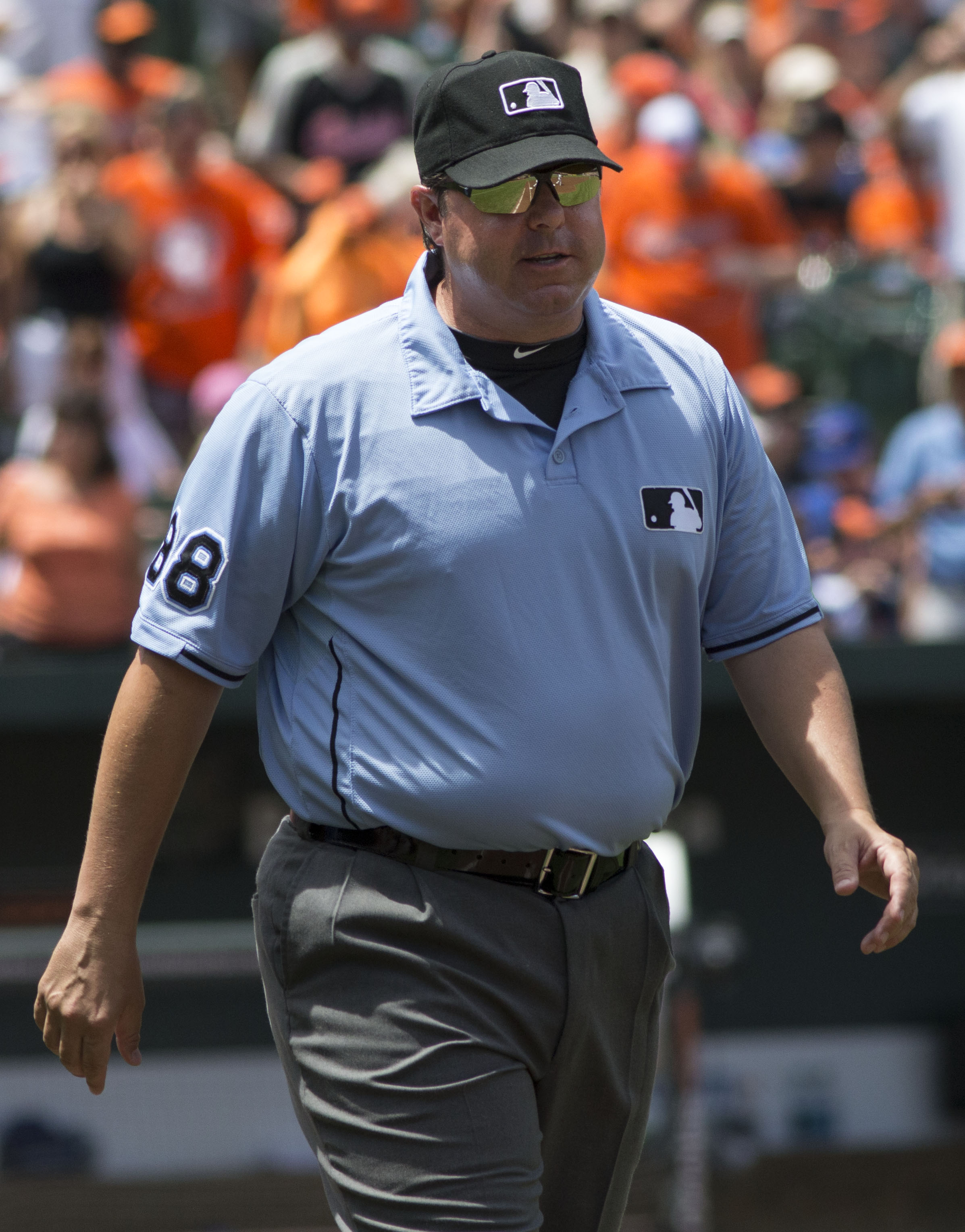
- Eddings in 2013

MLB – No. 88
- Umpire
- Born: September 14, 1968 (age 58); Las Cruces, New Mexico, U.S.

MLB debut
- August 16, 1998

Crew information
- Umpiring crew: B
- Crew members: #88 Doug Eddings (crew chief); #76 Mike Muchlinski; #47 Gabe Morales; #82 Emil Jímenez

Career highlights and awards
- Special assignments: World Series (2019, 2024); League Championship Series (2005, 2022, 2023, 2025); Division Series (2000, 2002, 2018, 2019, 2020, 2021, 2024); Wild Card Game/Series (2014, 2020, 2022, 2023); All-Star Game (2004, 2017); World Baseball Classic (2023)

Douglas Leon Eddings (born September 14, 1968) is an American professional umpire in Major League Baseball. He wears uniform number 88.

== Early life ==
Eddings first umpired baseball games at 12 years old at the request of his mother, who was on the board of the local Little League. Eddings attended Mayfield High School in New Mexico and New Mexico State University before attending Harry Wendelstedt Umpire School. He officiated high school baseball, basketball and football games in New Mexico for over a decade.

== Career ==
In his early career, he worked throughout the minor leagues. He started working American League games in 1998, and has worked throughout both major leagues since 2000. In the postseason, Eddings has worked four Wild Card Games/Series (2014, 2020, 2022, 2023), seven Division Series (including his postseason debut in 2000, 2002, 2018, 2019, 2020, 2021, 2024), three League Championship Series (2005, 2022, 2023), and two World Series (2019, 2024). He also worked the 2004 All-Star Game, the 2023 World Baseball Classic, and was the replay official for the 2017 All-Star Game.

Eddings was promoted to crew chief in 2025.

=== Notable games ===
Eddings was the home plate umpire for Cal Ripken Jr.'s final major league game on October 6, 2001. He was the second base umpire for the game between the San Francisco Giants and the San Diego Padres on August 4, 2007, at San Diego when Barry Bonds tied Hank Aaron for first place on Major League Baseball's career home run list by hitting his 755th career home run. He was the home plate umpire for Carlos Rodon's no-hitter thrown on April 14, 2021.

Eddings was the home plate umpire for Game 2 of the 2005 ALCS between the White Sox and the Angels. White Sox batter A. J. Pierzynski quickly got two strikes and then swung at the third pitch, a splitter which came in very low. Angels catcher Josh Paul caught the ball so "thought the inning was over." Not hearing himself called out, Pierzynski took a couple of steps toward the dugout, then turned and ran to first base while most of the Angels were walking off the field. Eddings ruled that the ball had not been legally caught (an uncaught third strike), but made no audible call that the ball hit the ground. Joe Buck and Tim McCarver, announcing the game on Fox and reviewing replays of the pitch, felt the ball had clearly been caught; note that MLB did not adopt review via instant replay until the 2008 season. A pinch runner for Pierzynski subsequently scored the winning run of the game for the White Sox. According to umpire supervisor Rich Rieker, the replays showed "there was definitely a change in direction there" indicating the ball touched the ground and felt, at best, the replay was inconclusive. After the game, Eddings said he would adjust his umpiring style to clarify a third strike call from calling the batter out.

In July and August 2021, Eddings would once again come under fire after being the home plate umpire in two San Diego Padres games. The first, on July 24, saw the ejections of Padres left fielder Tommy Pham and associate manager Skip Schumaker. The scorecard report on Eddings' performance also showed a +0.69 skew for the Padres opponent (which coincidentally happened to be the Marlins). Afterwards, the Padres filed a formal complaint against Eddings due to the result of the game. The next game, on August 20, saw the ejections of Padres manager Jayce Tingler, third baseman Manny Machado, and development coach Ryan Flaherty. The report for this game showed a greater skew (+1.21) that also favored the Padres opponent (this time, the Phillies).

Eddings worked his 3,000th game on June 13, 2023, at Globe Life Field in Arlington, Texas.

On September 4, 2026, during the Colorado Rockies game against the St. Louis Cardinals, Eddings told Cardinals pitcher Hancel Rincon to adjust his hat during Rincon’s major league debut. Cardinals manager Oliver Marmol expressed frustration with Eddings over the instruction leading to Marmol being ejected by Eddings. Eddings subsequently assessed a controversial pitch clock violation against Cardinals pitcher Justin Bruihl and later made an incorrect call at home plate on a play that resulted in a pivotal run for Colorado.

== Umpiring style ==
A report in The Hardball Times listed Eddings as having called the largest strike zone among all Major League umpires in 2011.

== See also ==
- List of Major League Baseball umpires (disambiguation)
