= A. J. Pierzynski =

American baseball player (born 1976)

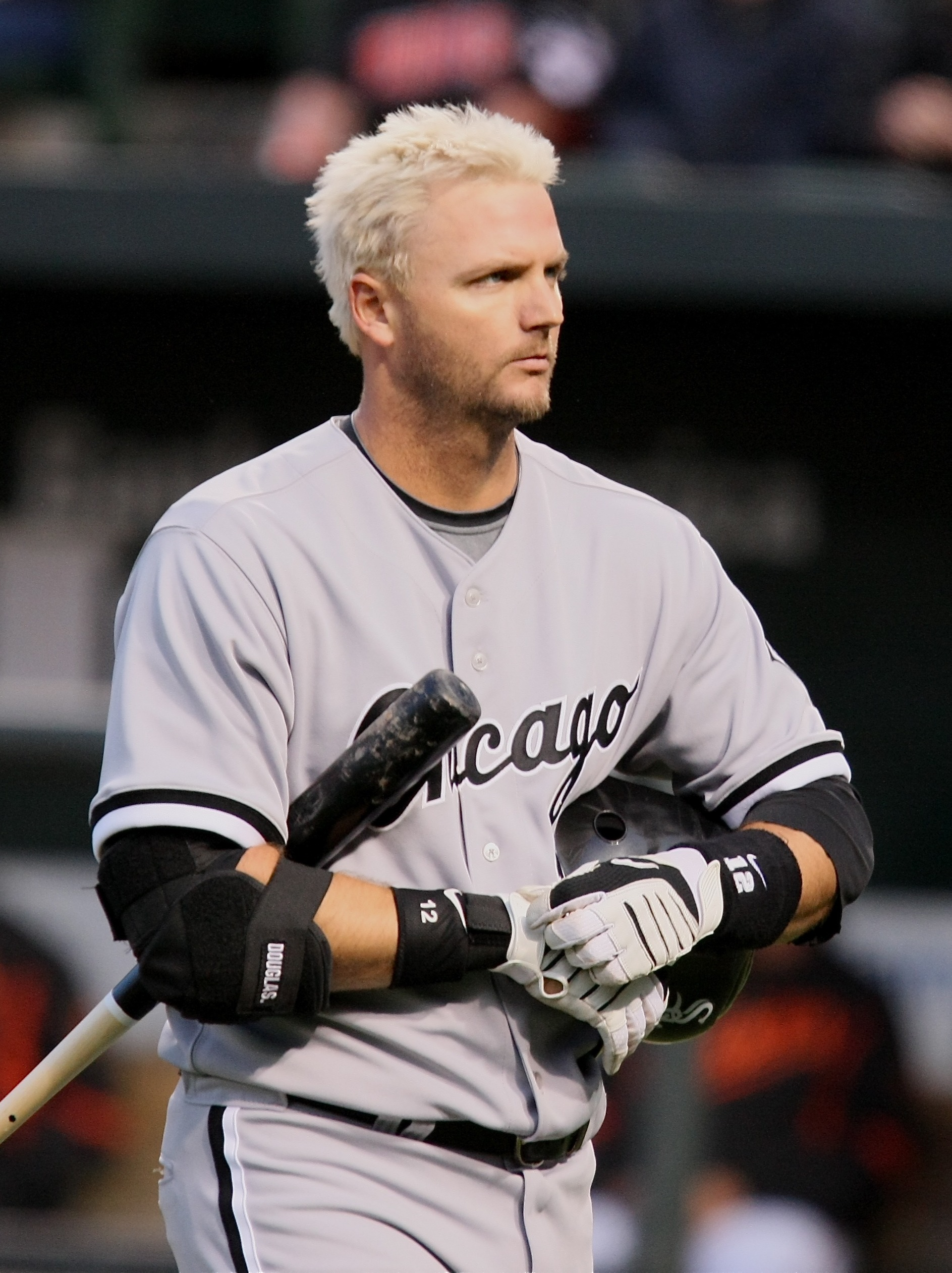
- Pierzynski with the Chicago White Sox in 2009
- Catcher
- Born: December 30, 1976 (age 49); Bridgehampton, New York, U.S.
- Batted: Left Threw: Right

MLB debut
- September 9, 1998, for the Minnesota Twins

Last appearance
- September 10, 2016, for the Atlanta Braves

MLB statistics
- Batting average: .280
- Hits: 2,043
- Home runs: 188
- Runs batted in: 909
- Stats at Baseball Reference

Teams
- Minnesota Twins (1998–2003); San Francisco Giants (2004); Chicago White Sox (2005–2012); Texas Rangers (2013); Boston Red Sox (2014); St. Louis Cardinals (2014); Atlanta Braves (2015–2016)

Career highlights and awards
- 2× All-Star (2002, 2006); World Series champion (2005); Silver Slugger Award (2012)

Anthony John Pierzynski (/pɪərˈzɪnski/; born December 30, 1976) is an American former professional baseball player and current television sports presenter. He played in Major League Baseball (MLB) as a catcher with the Minnesota Twins (1998–2003), San Francisco Giants (2004), Chicago White Sox (2005–2012), Texas Rangers (2013), Boston Red Sox (2014), St. Louis Cardinals (2014) and Atlanta Braves (2015–2016). Pierzynski is one of only thirteen catchers in Major League history to reach 2,000 hits in his career.

A two-time All-Star player and a Silver Slugger Award winner, Pierzynski was a member of the 2005 World Series winning White Sox team. He is known for having a strong and colorful personality, a fact he acknowledges. During his turn at the microphone following the White Sox victory parade in 2005, he thanked team personnel for "putting up" with him. Former White Sox manager Ozzie Guillén summed up the situation by saying, "If you play against him, you hate him. If you play with him, you hate him a little less." Guillén also acknowledged Pierzynski's value to the club despite being relatively high-maintenance: "A.J.'s been great for me. He's worth the work because he always shows up for you."

== Early life ==
Pierzynski was born on December 30, 1976, in Bridgehampton, New York. He attended Dr. Phillips High School in Orlando, Florida, where he won All-State honors in baseball. Future Major Leaguer Johnny Damon was one of Pierzynski's high school teammates. The National Polish-American Sports Hall of Fame held its 48th Annual Induction Banquet in September 2021, inducting Pierzynski.

== Professional career ==
=== Minnesota Twins ===
Pierzynski graduated from high school in 1994 and signed a letter of intent to play baseball at the University of Tennessee. He was also selected by the Minnesota Twins in the third round (71st overall) of the 1994 Major League Baseball draft and chose to sign with the ballclub on June 9. He began his minor league career with the Gulf Coast League Twins and spent the next four years playing for the minor-league Elizabethton Twins, Fort Wayne Wizards, Fort Myers Miracle, New Britain Rock Cats, and Salt Lake Buzz.

After four years in the Twins organization, Pierzynski was called up to the major league team, and made his debut on September 9, 1998, against the Anaheim Angels at the age of 21. Two days later, he singled off Oakland Athletics pitcher Billy Taylor for his first major league hit. He then spent the next five seasons, through the 2003 season, with Minnesota, though he was not a regular starter until 2001. From 1998 to 2000, Pierzynski appeared in just 49 games for the Twins. In 2002, he made the American League All-Star Team as a reserve catcher. In the 2002 American League Division Series, Pierzynski hit an important home run in the ninth inning of Game 5 against the Athletics, helping the Twins clinch the series. In 2003, Pierzynski batted a career-high .312 with 11 home runs and 74 RBI in 137 games.

=== San Francisco Giants ===
On November 14, 2003, the Twins traded Pierzynski to the San Francisco Giants for Joe Nathan, Francisco Liriano, and Boof Bonser. With the Giants, he hit .272 with 11 home runs and 77 RBI in 131 games. He spent one season in San Francisco before being non-tendered on December 15, 2004.

=== Chicago White Sox ===
Pierzynski was signed as a free agent to a one-year, $2.25 million contract by the Chicago White Sox on January 6, 2005. When he signed with the White Sox, the San Francisco Chronicle ran a story claiming that the catcher had kneed Giants trainer Stan Conte in the groin during a spring training game in 2004. Although the incident allegedly happened during the game, it went unreported for nearly a year in the press. Pierzynski has disputed the allegations publicly. "Don't you think if something like that happened, in spring training, you would have heard about it? I would have gotten in some sort of trouble?"

Pierzynski would hit 18 home runs, a new career high, with his most memorable home run of the regular season coming on June 18, 2005, against the Los Angeles Dodgers (with both teams wearing their 1959 throwback jerseys to commemorate their meeting in the 1959 World Series) in the bottom of the ninth to walk-off a 5–3 win. He would also set the single-season AL records for consecutive errorless games (117) and chances (777) by a catcher. The White Sox would go wire-to-wire in Pierzynski's first season with the team, winning the AL Central on September 29, 2005, over the Detroit Tigers. However, Pierzynski's biggest contributions would come during the White Sox' 2005 playoff run.

In the 2005 playoffs, Pierzynski was a major player for the White Sox. In Game 1 of the ALDS against the defending champion Red Sox, Pierzynski would start the White Sox off strong with a three-run homer in the first inning off Matt Clement. He would add a second home run in the bottom of the eighth off Bronson Arroyo to help lead the White Sox to a 14–2 win. Pierzynski finished the game 3-for-3 with 4 RBIs. Pierzynski also hit a double and scored an insurance run in the top of the ninth inning as the White Sox defeated the Red Sox 5–3 to clinch the series and move on to the ALCS. Perhaps Pierzynski's biggest and most well-known play came in Game 2 of the ALCS against the then Los Angeles Angels of Anaheim. Down 0–1 in the series and with the game tied at 1–1 in the bottom of the ninth inning, Pierzynski famously struck out on a low ball in the dirt from Kelvim Escobar. Thinking they had ended the inning, the Angels proceeded to walk off the field; however, noting that home plate umpire Doug Eddings had not made the out call, Pierzynski ran down the line to first base and was called safe. Angels catcher Josh Paul and manager Mike Scioscia argued with Eddings but the call stood, and Pierzynski was replaced by Pablo Ozuna, who promptly stole second base. Joe Crede would end the game on a walk-off double to tie the series at 1–1. The White Sox did not lose again, winning the next three games in Anaheim to advance to their first World Series since 1959. The White Sox would then sweep the Houston Astros to win their first championship in 88 years, as Pierzynski won the World Series the only time in his career. Pierzynski batted .262 with three home runs and 9 RBI, catching all 11 games for the White Sox during their championship run.

In 2006, Pierzynski continued his errorless streak, ending with 962 consecutive chances and breaking the AL record of 950 set by Yogi Berra in 1959. (The new record would later be broken by Mike Redmond.) He was named one of the five American League players in the All-Star Final Vote. Soon afterwards, the White Sox organization began an election campaign using the slogan "Punch A.J.". Pierzynski received 3.6 million votes, the most votes in the American League, subsequently sending him to his second All-Star appearance. The "Punch A.J." campaign was inspired by an incident on May 20, 2006, between Pierzynski and Chicago Cubs catcher Michael Barrett. After a fly ball out, Pierzynski tagged up at third base and tried to score on the throw. After a collision at home, where Pierzynski knocked Barrett from his feet, Pierzynski slapped home plate with his hand. After getting up, Barrett grabbed Pierzynski and punched him in the face. A bench-clearing brawl ensued, and Pierzynski, Barrett, White Sox outfielder Brian Anderson and Cubs first baseman John Mabry were ejected. When play finally resumed, outfielder Scott Podsednik promptly got on base, loading the bases up, and second baseman Tadahito Iguchi cleared them with a grand-slam. The White Sox won the game, 7–0. Barrett was suspended for 10 games, while Anderson was suspended for five, and Pierzynski was fined.

Pierzynski caught Mark Buehrle's no-hitter on April 18, 2007, but not his perfect game on July 23, 2009. He caught Philip Humber's perfect game on April 21, 2012, against the Seattle Mariners at Safeco Field, as well. On May 28, 2007, in a game versus the Minnesota Twins, Pierzynski twice ran down the first base line with his feet on the inside of the base, possibly nipping Twins first baseman Justin Morneau with his spikes. Twins manager Ron Gardenhire was furious with the umpires, which resulted in a long tirade. However, he was not ejected. Pierzynski denied any attempt to step on Morneau.

On September 29, 2007, Pierzynski signed a two-year, $12.5 million contract extension with the White Sox.

In 2008, Pierzynski got off to a hot start during the first week of the season, going 10 for 20 with two home runs and winning the American League Player of the Week award. However, he cooled off for the rest of the season comparatively, hitting .281/.312/.416 with 13 home runs and 60 runs batted in.

On December 3, 2010, Pierzynski agreed to a two-year, $8 million contract to remain with the White Sox.

On June 13, 2012, Pierzynski was rated the most hated MLB player. In 2012, Pierzynski homered in five consecutive games, tying the franchise record and becoming the sixth player to achieve this feat. His teammate Paul Konerko was the most recent Sox player to achieve this feat in 2011. Pierzynski had a career offensive year, winning a Silver Slugger Award at catcher for the first time in his career. He posted a slash line of .278/.326/.501, and hit 27 home runs and 77 RBI in 135 games.

=== Texas Rangers ===
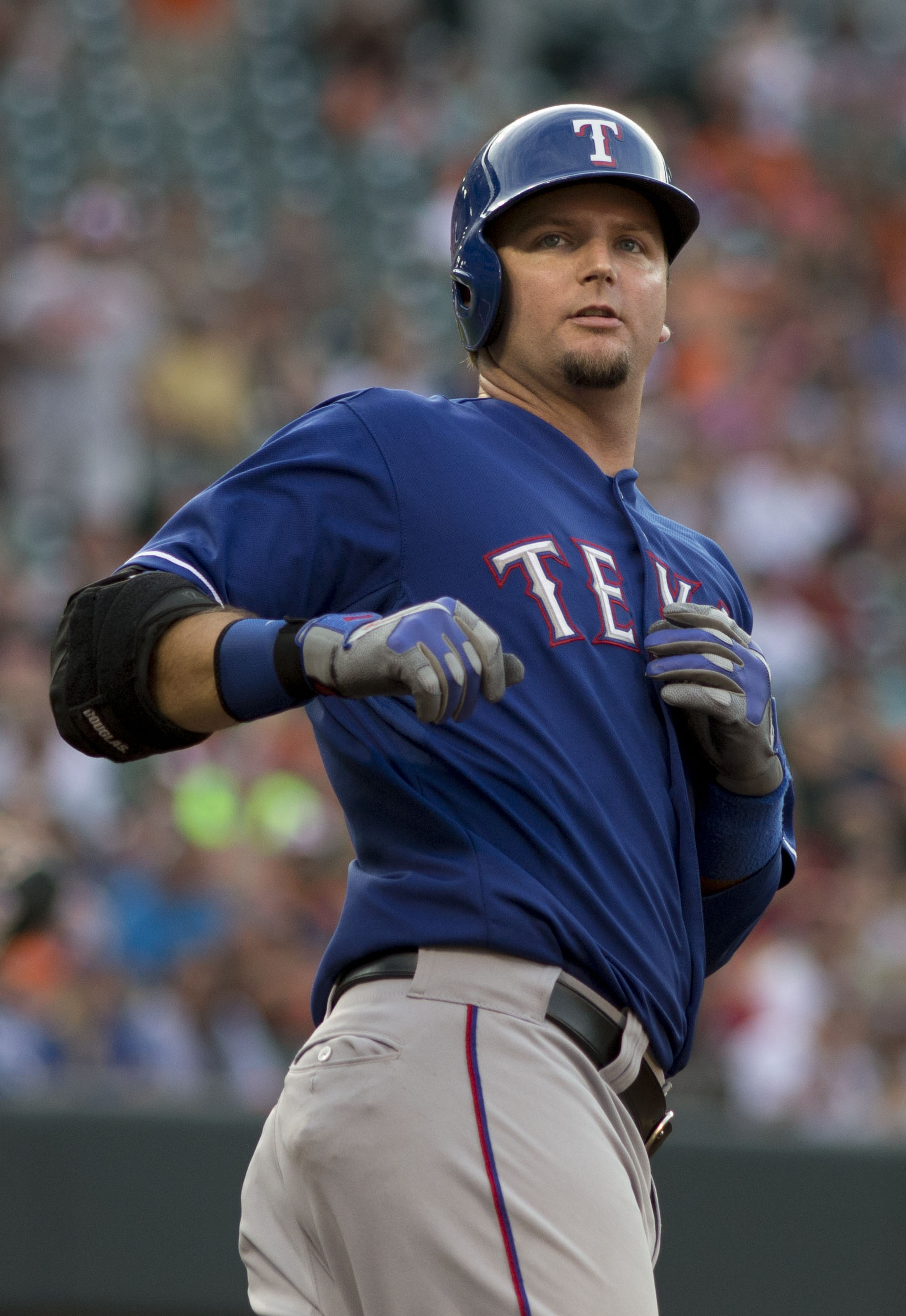
Pierzynski with the Texas Rangers in 2013

On December 26, 2012, Pierzynski agreed to a one-year, $7.5 million contract with the Texas Rangers for the 2013 season. He enjoyed a solid year for Texas, hitting .272 with 17 home runs and 70 RBIs in 134 games.

=== Boston Red Sox ===
On December 3, 2013, Pierzynski agreed to a one-year contract with the Boston Red Sox, pending the completion of a physical examination. The deal became official the next day. On June 4, 2014, Pierzynski was ejected by umpire Quinn Wolcott after a leadoff walk by pitcher Brandon Workman because he asked Wolcott to "give me a new ball. One you can see." This was Pierzynski's ninth career ejection. Pierzynski's offense regressed with Boston as he hit .254/.286/.348 in 256 at-bats.

On July 9, 2014, Pierzynski was designated for assignment and Christian Vázquez was promoted from AAA Pawtucket. A sports column in a Boston newspaper cited disgruntled anonymous Red Sox teammates who disliked Pierzynski, blaming him for the team's overall woes. On July 16, the Red Sox officially released Pierzynski. The Red Sox continued a disastrous slide after Pierzynski departed, and finished 2014 with a record of 71–91.

=== St. Louis Cardinals ===
On July 26, 2014, the St. Louis Cardinals signed Pierzynski to a major league deal. Later that day, he debuted for St. Louis with a 3-for-4 outing and an RBI, helping to defeat the Cubs 6–3. Former Boston teammate John Lackey soon arrived via trade, and Pierzynski caught him for the 19th time in 22 starts in 2014 when he debuted for the Cardinals on August 3. It was the pitcher's 150th career win. Pierzynski's first home run with St. Louis came in a loss to Baltimore on August 8. He hit .244/.295/.305 in 82 at-bats along with a home run and 6 RBI. He served mostly as a replacement catcher for Yadier Molina, who was on the disabled list from July 10 through August 28, though he did play as a backup after Molina's return. The Cardinals left Pierzynski off the playoff roster for the NLDS against the Dodgers, but added him for the NLCS against the Giants.

=== Atlanta Braves ===
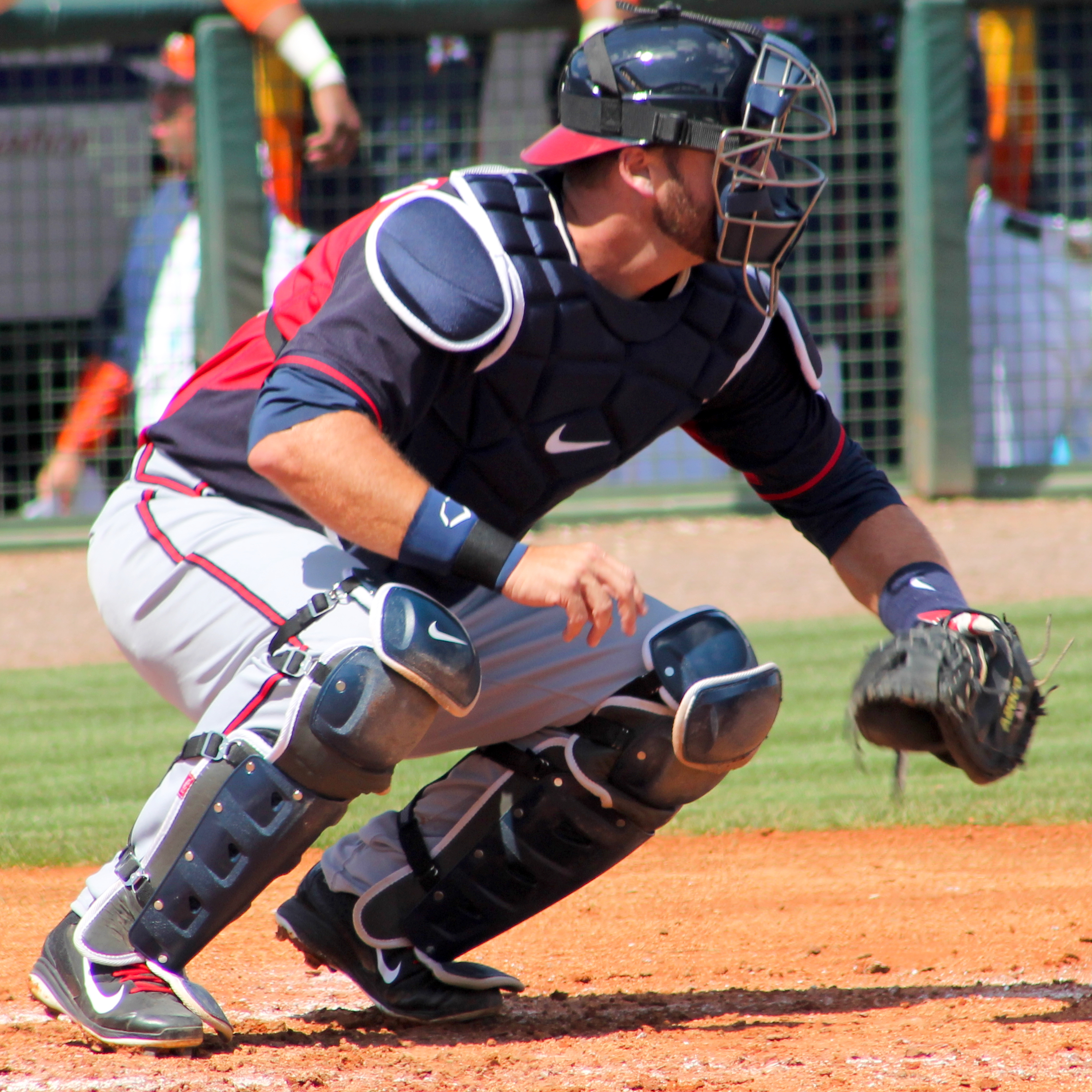
Pierzynski with the Atlanta Braves in 2015 spring training

Pierzynski and the Atlanta Braves finalized a one-year deal worth $2 million on January 7, 2015. The Braves had intended to use him as a backup catcher and mentor to Christian Bethancourt. However, Bethancourt struggled defensively and was eventually sent down to Gwinnett in the hope that he would improve, forcing Pierzynski into a starting role. On July 18, 2015, in a game against the Chicago Cubs, Pierzynski broke up Jon Lester's no-hit bid in the eighth inning of the Braves' 4–0 loss.

On April 27, 2016, Pierzynski recorded his 2,000th career hit off Steven Wright of the Boston Red Sox, becoming the tenth catcher to reach the 2,000 hit mark. He was placed on 15-day disabled list on August 17, 2016. On March 28, 2017, Pierzynski announced he was retiring.

Pierzynski was included on the ballot for the National Baseball Hall of Fame class of 2022 when it was announced on November 22, 2021. He received only two votes and fell off the ballot.

== Broadcasting career ==
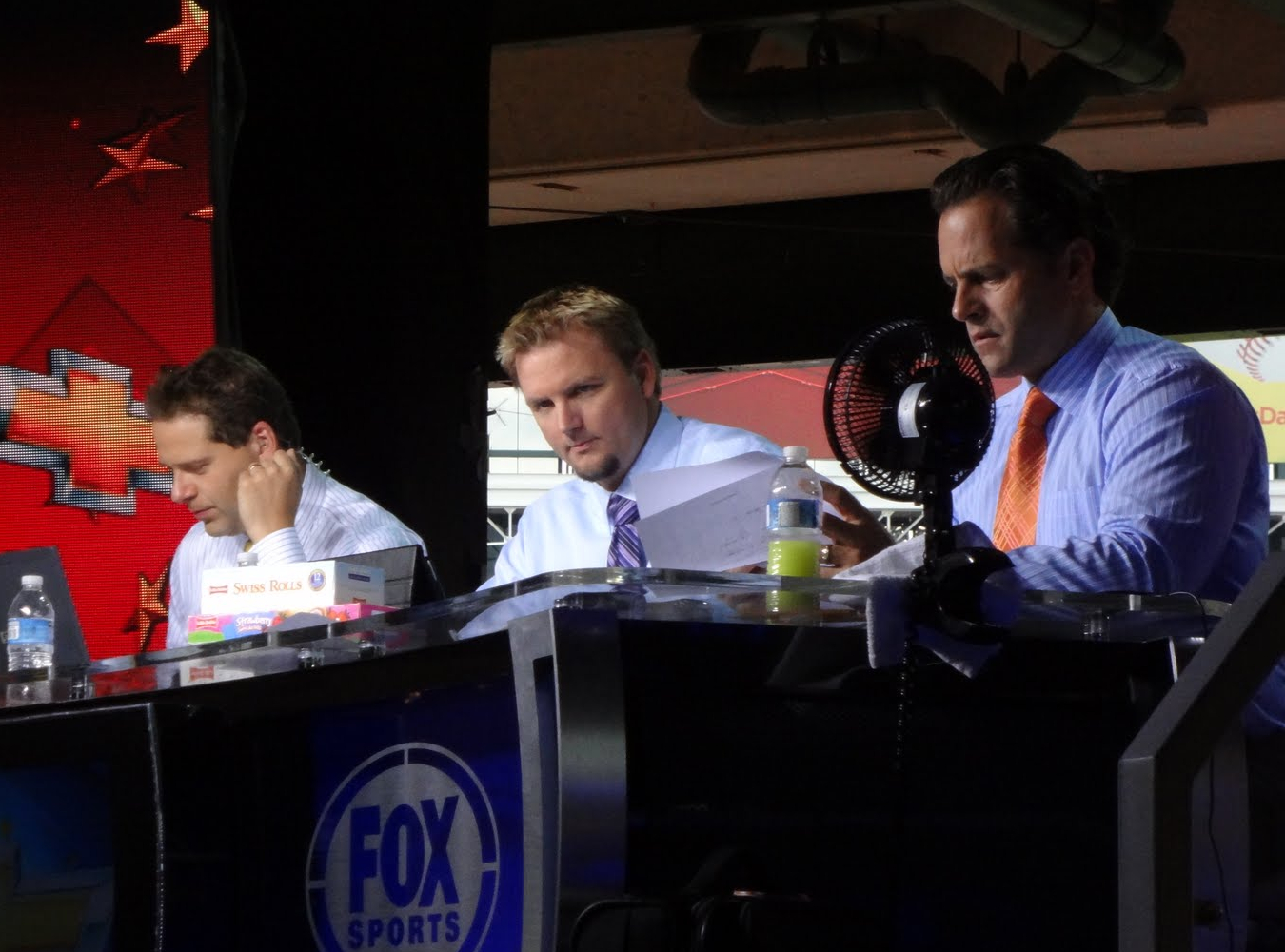
Chris Rose (left), Pierzynski (center), and Eric Karros (right) during the pregame show of the 2011 World Series

Pierzynski was hired by Fox to be an analyst for the 2011 MLB postseason on the pregame and postgame show. He joined Fox again for the 2012, 2013, and 2015 postseasons. In 2017, Fox announced he would be a full-time analyst.

== Professional wrestling ==
On December 8, 2005, Pierzynski appeared on TNA Impact!, a professional wrestling television program aired by the professional wrestling promotion Total Nonstop Action Wrestling. Accompanied by White Sox strength trainer Dale Torborg, Pierzynski presented TNA wrestlers A.J. Styles, Chris Sabin and Sonjay Dutt with memorabilia from the 2005 World Series. At the ceremony, an incident was staged to include Pierzynski in a controversy with the wrestlers. Pierzynski then made his professional wrestling managerial debut at TNA Turning Point 2005 on December 11, 2005, accompanying Torborg, Sabin and Dutt to ringside for their match against the Diamonds in the Rough.

On October 10, 2006, Pierzynski appeared on ESPN2's Cold Pizza, wearing the X-Division Championship belt, and challenged WWE Champion John Cena, who was also a guest that morning, to a Title vs. Title steel cage match whenever Cena wanted to have it. Cena responded asking if Pierzynski got his championship belt out of a gumball machine outside.

Pierzynski returned to TNA in January 2007, when he and Torborg confronted Lance Hoyt. At TNA Against All Odds (2007) Pierzynski was in Torborg's corner when he was defeated by Hoyt, who had David Eckstein in his corner.

On the September 7, 2009, edition of WWE Raw, Pierzynski made his first appearance on WWE television, replacing Chris Jericho in a game show called The Price is Raw, with Bob Barker hosting.

== Personal life ==
Pierzynski and his wife, Lisa, have two children, Ava and Austin.

AJ is a main host on the Foul Territory Podcast with Erik Kratz and Scott Braun. He is known for his blunt takes and his fun banter with senior insider Ken Rosenthal.

== See also ==
- List of Major League Baseball career hits leaders
- List of Major League Baseball career putouts as a catcher leaders
- List of Major League Baseball career putouts leaders
