= Josh Paul (baseball) =

American baseball player and coach (born 1975)

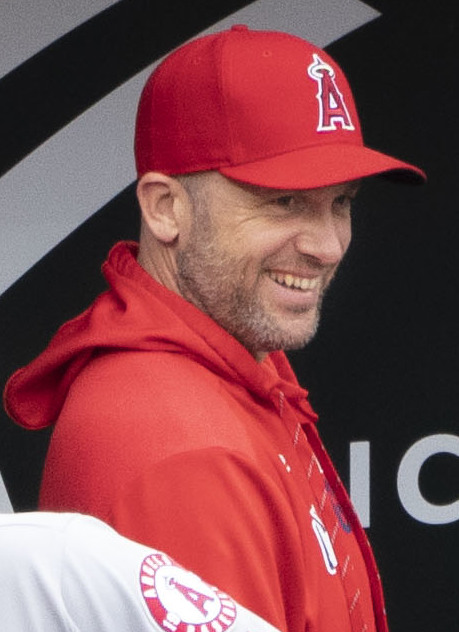
- Paul with the Los Angeles Angels in 2019
- Catcher
- Born: May 19, 1975 (age 51); Evanston, Illinois, U.S.
- Batted: Right Threw: Right

MLB debut
- September 7, 1999, for the Chicago White Sox

Last MLB appearance
- September 26, 2007, for the Tampa Bay Devil Rays

MLB statistics
- Batting average: .244
- Home runs: 10
- Runs batted in: 73
- Stats at Baseball Reference

Teams
- Chicago White Sox (1999–2003); Chicago Cubs (2003); Anaheim Angels / Los Angeles Angels of Anaheim (2004–2005); Tampa Bay Devil Rays (2006–2007)

Joshua William Paul (born May 19, 1975) is an American former professional baseball catcher and professional coach. He most recently served as the quality control coach for the Detroit Tigers of Major League Baseball (MLB). He played in MLB for the Los Angeles Angels, Chicago White Sox, Chicago Cubs, and Tampa Bay Devil Rays. He also coached the Angels and New York Yankees.

== Amateur career ==
Paul attended Buffalo Grove High School in Buffalo Grove, Illinois, and Vanderbilt University, where he played college baseball for the Commodores. In 1995, he played collegiate summer baseball for the Cotuit Kettleers of the Cape Cod Baseball League (CCBL). He hit .364 to lead the league, and was named the league's MVP and outstanding pro prospect. Paul was inducted into the CCBL Hall of Fame in 2006.

== Professional career ==
The Chicago White Sox selected Paul in the 1996 MLB draft. He made his major league debut in 1999 and played for the White Sox until he was granted his outright release in 2003. He was signed by the Chicago Cubs, but was again released in October of the same year. The Anaheim Angels signed him in 2004.

Paul was a member of the 2005 Angels team that reached the American League Championship Series against the White Sox. In Game 2 of the ALCS, Paul entered as a defensive replacement in the eighth inning and was involved in a controversial play near the end of the game. With the score tied and two outs in the bottom of the ninth in Game 2, Paul appeared to catch a swinging third strike on a low pitch from pitcher Kelvim Escobar to White Sox batter A. J. Pierzynski, which would have been the third out and sent the game to extra innings. Believing the inning was over, Paul walked towards the dugout and rolled the ball towards the pitcher's mound, but umpire Doug Eddings ruled that the pitch had touched the ground and resulted in a dropped third strike; after taking an initial step back to his own dugout, Pierzynski turned around and ran to first base, and was ruled safe. Several Angels contended that Eddings signaled that the batter was out, causing the Angels to believe the inning was over; for his part, after the game Paul said: “I caught the ball. It was strike three. He was out...It’s not my fault. I take no responsibility for that whatsoever.” Pierzynski was replaced with a pinch runner, who stole second and scored on a double by the next batter to win the game for the White Sox and even the series at one game apiece. The White Sox won the next three games to win the series. Paul was traded after the season to the Devil Rays for minor league third baseman Travis Schlichting.

After starting catcher Toby Hall was traded to the Los Angeles Dodgers, Dioner Navarro came to Tampa Bay as the Devil Rays' main catcher. Paul was limited to 35 games in 2007 because of hand and elbow injuries. On February 1, 2008, the Rays signed Paul to a minor league contract with an invitation to spring training. After failing to make the team, Paul was released and signed with the Houston Astros on April 6. On June 14, the Astros released Paul. In his nine-year major league career he batted .244/.303/.341 with 10 home runs and 5 stolen bases in 321 games.

== Coaching career ==
Paul was named the manager of the Staten Island Yankees of the Class A-Short Season New York-Penn League prior to the 2009 season. Paul served as interim bullpen coach for the New York Yankees in 2010 while Dave Eiland was away from the team for personal reasons. From 2014 through 2017, Paul served as the Yankees' minor league catching coordinator.

The Angels hired Paul as their bench coach after the 2017 season.

The Tigers hired Paul as their quality control coach prior to the 2020 season. On September 22, 2020, the Tigers added interim bench coach to his duties when Ron Gardenhire suddenly retired and bench coach Lloyd McClendon was promoted to interim manager. Paul was dismissed following the 2022 season.

== Personal life ==
Paul's younger brother, Jeremy, also played baseball.

Paul lost a friend in the September 11 attacks. He was a proponent of MLB playing games scheduled on September 11, 2002.

Preceded by Dino Ebel	Los Angeles Angels bench coach 2018–2019	Succeeded by Mike Gallego
