= 2008 Major League Baseball postseason =

2008 Major League Baseball playoffs

Tournament details
- Dates: October 1–29, 2008
- Teams: 8

Final positions
- Champions: Philadelphia Phillies (2nd title)
- Runners-up: Tampa Bay Rays

Tournament statistics
- Most HRs: B. J. Upton (TB) (7)
- Most SBs: Carl Crawford (TB) (7)
- Most Ks (as pitcher): Cole Hamels (PHI) (30)

Awards
- MVP: Cole Hamels (PHI)

The 2008 Major League Baseball postseason was the playoff tournament of Major League Baseball for the 2008 season. The winners of the Division Series would move on to the League Championship Series to determine the pennant winners that face each other in the World Series.

In the American League, the Los Angeles Angels of Anaheim returned to the postseason for the fifth time in seven years, the Boston Red Sox returned for the fifth time in six years, the Chicago White Sox made their third appearance in the past nine years, and the Tampa Bay Rays made their postseason debut, officially marking the moment when all 30 active MLB teams made the postseason. This was the last postseason appearance for the White Sox until 2020.

In the National League, the Chicago Cubs returned for the third time in six years, marking the first time since the 1906 World Series that both Chicago teams made the postseason. The Philadelphia Phillies made their second straight appearance, the Los Angeles Dodgers made their third appearance in the past five years, and the Milwaukee Brewers ended over a quarter-century of futility by making their first postseason appearance since 1982 (first as a member of the National League), ending what was the second longest postseason appearance drought in the league at the time.

This was the first postseason since 1993 to not feature the New York Yankees, who had previously made thirteen straight appearances from 1995 to 2007.

The postseason began on October 1, 2008, and ended on October 29, 2008, with the Phillies defeating the Rays in five games in the 2008 World Series. It was the first championship won by the Phillies since 1980.

== Playoff seeds ==
American League Teams National League Teams

The following teams qualified for the postseason:

=== American League ===
1. Los Angeles Angels of Anaheim – 100–62, AL West champions
2. Tampa Bay Rays – 97–65, AL East champions
3. Chicago White Sox – 89–74, AL Central champions
4. Boston Red Sox – 95–67

=== National League ===
1. Chicago Cubs – 97–64, NL Central champions
2. Philadelphia Phillies – 92–70, NL East champions
3. Los Angeles Dodgers – 84–78, NL West champions
4. Milwaukee Brewers – 90–72

== Playoff bracket ==
Division Series (ALDS, NLDS)
1 | LA Angels | 1
4 | Boston | 3
American League
2 | Tampa Bay | 3
3 | Chicago White Sox | 1
1 | Chicago Cubs | 0
3 | LA Dodgers | 3
National League
2 | Philadelphia | 3
4 | Milwaukee | 1

League Championship Series (NLCS, ALCS)
4 | Boston | 3
2 | Tampa Bay | 4
3 | LA Dodgers | 1
2 | Philadelphia | 4

World Series
AL2 | Tampa Bay | 1
NL2 | Philadelphia | 4

Note: Two teams in the same division could not meet in the division series.

== American League Division Series ==
=== (1) Los Angeles Angels of Anaheim vs. (4) Boston Red Sox ===
Boston won the series, 3–1.

| Game | Date | Score | Location | Time | Attendance |
|---|---|---|---|---|---|
| 1 | October 1 | Boston Red Sox – 4, Los Angeles Angels of Anaheim – 1 | Angel Stadium of Anaheim | 3:14 | 44,996 |
| 2 | October 3 | Boston Red Sox – 7, Los Angeles Angels of Anaheim – 5 | Angel Stadium of Anaheim | 3:51 | 45,354 |
| 3 | October 5 | Los Angeles Angels of Anaheim – 5, Boston Red Sox – 4 (12) | Fenway Park | 5:19 | 39,067 |
| 4 | October 6 | Los Angeles Angels of Anaheim – 2, Boston Red Sox – 3 | Fenway Park | 2:50 | 38,785 |

This was the fourth postseason meeting between the Red Sox and Angels (1986, 2004, 2007). In a rematch of the previous year's ALDS, the Red Sox again defeated the Angels to advance to the ALCS for the second year in a row.

Jon Lester out-dueled John Lackey in as the Red Sox stole Game 1 on the road. Game 2 was an offensive slugfest between both teams as the game was tied at five going into the top of the ninth, until J.D. Drew won the game for the Red Sox with a two-run home run to give the Red Sox a 2–0 series lead heading to Boston. Game 3 was an extra-innings grind that was won by the Angels thanks to a solo home run from Mike Napoli in the top of the twelfth. The Angels' Game 3 win ended an 11-game postseason losing streak against the Red Sox that dated back to the 1986 ALCS, and a nine-game overall postseason skid that dated back to the 2005 ALCS. However, that would be all the Angels could do, as the Red Sox prevailed in Game 4 by a 3–2 score thanks to a walk-off single from Jed Lowrie.

The Angels would sweep the Red Sox in the ALDS the next year.

=== (2) Tampa Bay Rays vs. (3) Chicago White Sox ===
Tampa Bay won the series, 3–1.

| Game | Date | Score | Location | Time | Attendance |
|---|---|---|---|---|---|
| 1 | October 2 | Chicago White Sox – 4, Tampa Bay Rays – 6 | Tropicana Field | 3:10 | 35,041 |
| 2 | October 3 | Chicago White Sox – 2, Tampa Bay Rays – 6 | Tropicana Field | 3:10 | 35,257 |
| 3 | October 5 | Tampa Bay Rays – 3, Chicago White Sox – 5 | U.S. Cellular Field | 3:07 | 40,142 |
| 4 | October 6 | Tampa Bay Rays – 6, Chicago White Sox – 2 | U.S. Cellular Field | 3:13 | 40,454 |

In their postseason debut, the Rays defeated the White Sox in four games to advance to the ALCS for the first time in franchise history.

Two home runs from Evan Longoria would carry the Rays to their first postseason victory in Game 1. Longoria became the first player to hit two home runs in his first two career postseason at-bats since Gary Gaetti in 1987. In Game 2, the White Sox lead 2-1 after four innings, but the Rays would put up five unanswered runs in the bottom of the fifth and eighth innings to take a 2–0 series lead heading to Chicago. John Danks pitched six solid innings as the White Sox took Game 3 to get on the board in the series. In Game 4, two home runs from B. J. Upton gave the Rays a lead they would not let go of as they won by four runs to advance to their first ALCS.

== National League Division Series ==
=== (1) Chicago Cubs vs. (3) Los Angeles Dodgers ===
Los Angeles won the series, 3–0.

| Game | Date | Score | Location | Time | Attendance |
|---|---|---|---|---|---|
| 1 | October 1 | Los Angeles Dodgers – 7, Chicago Cubs – 2 | Wrigley Field | 3:10 | 42,099 |
| 2 | October 2 | Los Angeles Dodgers – 10, Chicago Cubs – 3 | Wrigley Field | 3:10 | 42,136 |
| 3 | October 4 | Chicago Cubs – 1, Los Angeles Dodgers – 3 | Dodger Stadium | 3:03 | 56,000 |

This was the first postseason meeting between the Cubs and Dodgers. The Dodgers swept the Cubs to return to the NLCS for the first time in two decades.

The series started disastrously for the Cubs, as the Dodger offense overwhelmed the Cubs’ pitching staff in back-to-back blowout wins to take a 2–0 series lead heading to Los Angeles. Hiroki Kuroda pitched six innings of shutout ball and the Dodgers' bullpen held the Cubs to one run scored as the Dodgers completed the sweep in Game 3. This was the first playoff series win for the Dodgers since the 1988 World Series.

Both teams would meet again in the NLCS in 2016 and 2017, with the Cubs winning the former en route to a World Series title, and the Dodgers winning the latter before falling in the World Series.

=== (2) Philadelphia Phillies vs. (4) Milwaukee Brewers ===
Philadelphia won the series, 3–1.

| Game | Date | Score | Location | Time | Attendance |
|---|---|---|---|---|---|
| 1 | October 1 | Milwaukee Brewers – 1, Philadelphia Phillies – 3 | Citizens Bank Park | 2:39 | 45,929 |
| 2 | October 2 | Milwaukee Brewers – 2, Philadelphia Phillies – 5 | Citizens Bank Park | 3:00 | 46,208 |
| 3 | October 4 | Philadelphia Phillies – 1, Milwaukee Brewers – 4 | Miller Park | 3:31 | 43,992 |
| 4 | October 5 | Philadelphia Phillies – 6, Milwaukee Brewers – 2 | Miller Park | 2:53 | 43,934 |

The Phillies defeated the Brewers in four games to return to the NLCS for the first time since 1993.

Cole Hamels pitched eight shutout innings of two-hit ball while striking out nine as the Phillies prevailed by a 3–1 score in Game 1. Brett Myers helped lead the Phillies to victory in Game 2 with a solid seven-inning performance as they took a 2–0 series lead heading to Milwaukee. In the first postseason game in Milwaukee in 26 years, Dave Bush pitched five shutout innings and the bullpen held the Phillies to one run scored as the Brewers took Game 3. In Game 4, Jimmy Rollins, Pat Burrell, and Jayson Werth all homered for the Phillies as they won to close out the series. This was the first playoff series won by the Phillies since winning the National League pennant in 1993.

== American League Championship Series ==
=== (2) Tampa Bay Rays vs. (4) Boston Red Sox ===
Tampa Bay won the series, 4–3.

| Game | Date | Score | Location | Time | Attendance |
|---|---|---|---|---|---|
| 1 | October 10 | Boston Red Sox – 2, Tampa Bay Rays – 0 | Tropicana Field | 3:25 | 35,001 |
| 2 | October 11 | Boston Red Sox – 8, Tampa Bay Rays – 9 (11) | Tropicana Field | 5:27 | 34,904 |
| 3 | October 13 | Tampa Bay Rays – 9, Boston Red Sox – 1 | Fenway Park | 3:23 | 38,031 |
| 4 | October 14 | Tampa Bay Rays – 13, Boston Red Sox – 4 | Fenway Park | 3:07 | 38,133 |
| 5 | October 16 | Tampa Bay Rays – 7, Boston Red Sox – 8 | Fenway Park | 4:08 | 38,437 |
| 6 | October 18 | Boston Red Sox – 4, Tampa Bay Rays – 2 | Tropicana Field | 3:48 | 40,947 |
| 7 | October 19 | Boston Red Sox – 1, Tampa Bay Rays – 3 | Tropicana Field | 3:31 | 40,473 |

This was the first postseason meeting in the history of the Rays–Red Sox rivalry. The Rays knocked off the defending World Series champion Red Sox in seven games to advance to the World Series for the first time in franchise history (in the process denying a rematch of the 1915 World Series between the Red Sox and Phillies).

Daisuke Matsuzaka pitched eight innings of shutout ball as the Red Sox stole Game 1 on the road. The Rays would prevail in a Game 2 slugfest by a 9–8 score thanks to a walk-off sacrifice fly by B.J. Upton in the bottom of the eleventh. Game 2 lasted 5 hours and 27 minutes, and featured seven home runs, which broke the ALCS record and tied the all-time LCS record. When the series shifted to Boston, things got ugly for the Red Sox as the Rays’ offense overwhelmed the Sox pitching staff in back-to-back blowout wins in Games 3 and 4 to take a 3–1 series lead. In Game 5, the Rays looked poised to close out the series with yet another blowout win as they lead 7–0 going into the bottom of the seventh. However, the Red Sox pulled off an improbable rally as they scored eight unanswered runs to send the series back to St. Petersburg. The Red Sox's Game 5 comeback was the second-largest in postseason history, the largest since Game 4 of the 1929 World Series, and the largest ever for a team on the brink of elimination. Game 6 remained tied until the sixth, when Jason Varitek’s solo homer put the Red Sox in the lead for good as they forced a seventh game. However, the defending World Series champions would come up short. Despite falling behind early, the Rays put up three unanswered runs as they won 3–1 to secure their first ever AL pennant.

The Red Sox would return to the ALCS in 2013, and defeated the Detroit Tigers in six games en route to a World Series title.

The Rays would win their next and most recent pennant in 2020 against the Houston Astros in seven games before falling in the World Series.

The Rays and Red Sox would meet again in the ALDS in 2013, and 2021, with both being won by the Red Sox.

== National League Championship Series ==
=== (2) Philadelphia Phillies vs. (3) Los Angeles Dodgers ===
Philadelphia won the series, 4–1.

| Game | Date | Score | Location | Time | Attendance |
|---|---|---|---|---|---|
| 1 | October 9 | Los Angeles Dodgers – 2, Philadelphia Phillies – 3 | Citizens Bank Park | 2:36 | 45,839 |
| 2 | October 10 | Los Angeles Dodgers – 5, Philadelphia Phillies – 8 | Citizens Bank Park | 3:33 | 45,883 |
| 3 | October 12 | Philadelphia Phillies – 2, Los Angeles Dodgers – 7 | Dodger Stadium | 2:57 | 56,800 |
| 4 | October 13 | Philadelphia Phillies – 7, Los Angeles Dodgers – 5 | Dodger Stadium | 3:44 | 56,800 |
| 5 | October 15 | Philadelphia Phillies – 5, Los Angeles Dodgers – 1 | Dodger Stadium | 3:14 | 56,800 |

This was the fourth postseason meeting between the Phillies and Dodgers (1977, 1978, 1983). This was the first of currently ten NLCS appearances the Dodgers would make over the course of the next seventeen years. The Phillies defeated the Dodgers in five quick games to return to the World Series for the first time since 1993.

In Game 1, the Dodgers jumped out to an early 2–0 lead, but it would vanish in the bottom of the sixth as Chase Utley and Pat Burrell would lead the Phillies to a 3–2 victory with a pair of home runs. Game 2 was an offensive duel in which the Phillies' bullpen held off a rally by the Dodgers to go up 2–0 in the series headed to Los Angeles. In Game 3, the Dodgers blew out the Phillies to get on the board in the series. Game 3 was marred by controversy, as a dramatic benches-clearing incident in the third inning occurred when Dodgers starter Hiroki Kuroda threw a fastball over the head of the Phillies' Shane Victorino. This came in retaliation for Phillies starter Jamie Moyer hitting Dodgers catcher Russell Martin in the knee in the first inning and reliever Clay Condrey nearly hitting Martin again in the second, which came after Brett Myers nearly hit Martin and threw behind Manny Ramírez in Game 2. Game 4 was yet another offensive slugfest that was won by the Phillies, 7–5, as Victorino and Matt Stairs hit a pair of two-run home runs in the top of the eighth which put the Phillies ahead for good. NLCS MVP Cole Hamels pitched seven solid innings in Game 5 as the Phillies prevailed by a 5–1 score to win the NL pennant. Game 5 was Greg Maddux’s final postseason game, and he retired after the end of the season.

This was the first of four consecutive losses in the NLCS for the Dodgers. The next year, they lost to the Phillies in five games once again, in 2013 they were defeated by their archrival in the St. Louis Cardinals in six games, and in 2016 they lost to the Chicago Cubs, also in six games. The Dodgers would eventually win the NL pennant again in 2017 over the Cubs in five games.

== 2008 World Series ==
=== (AL2) Tampa Bay Rays vs. (NL2) Philadelphia Phillies ===
Philadelphia won the series, 4–1.

| Game | Date | Score | Location | Time | Attendance |
|---|---|---|---|---|---|
| 1 | October 22 | Philadelphia Phillies – 3, Tampa Bay Rays – 2 | Tropicana Field | 3:23 | 40,783 |
| 2 | October 23 | Philadelphia Phillies – 2, Tampa Bay Rays – 4 | Tropicana Field | 3:05 | 40,843 |
| 3 | October 25 | Tampa Bay Rays – 4, Philadelphia Phillies – 5 | Citizens Bank Park | 3:41 | 45,900 |
| 4 | October 26 | Tampa Bay Rays – 2, Philadelphia Phillies – 10 | Citizens Bank Park | 3:08 | 45,903 |
| 5 | October 27†/29 | Tampa Bay Rays – 3, Philadelphia Phillies – 4 | Citizens Bank Park | 3:28 | 45,940 |

† - Game suspended in the sixth inning due to rain.

This was the first World Series since 2001 to not feature a Wild Card team, and the first since 1993 to feature a team from Pennsylvania. The Phillies defeated the Rays in five games to win their first championship since 1980.

Cole Hamels pitched seven strong innings, out-dueling Scott Kazmir in Game 1 as the Phillies struck first on the road. In Game 2, David Price held off a late rally by the Phillies to help the Rays even the series headed to Philadelphia. In Game 3, the Phillies would prevail by one run as reliever J.C. Romero held off a late rally by the Rays. In Game 4, the Phillies blew out the Rays in Game 4 to take a 3–1 series lead. In Game 5, the Phillies jumped out to a 3–2 lead going into the sixth, but was then suspended thanks to heavy rain and resumed on Wednesday, October 29. Game 5 of the 2008 World Series was the first game in World Series history not to be played through to completion or declared a tie. However, the rain delay did not help the Rays, as the Phillies prevailed thanks to a single from Pedro Feliz which gave the Phillies a 4–3 victory and the title.

This was the first championship of the four major North American sports leagues won by a team from Philadelphia since 1983, when the Philadelphia 76ers won the 1983 NBA Finals. The Phillies returned to the World Series the next year in hopes of defending their title, but fell to the New York Yankees in six games.

This was the first of what is currently three consecutive losses in the World Series for the Rays. Following their loss to Philadelphia, the Rays returned to the World Series in 2020, but fell to the Los Angeles Dodgers in six games. The Rays then returned to the World Series in 2026, and lost to the Milwaukee Brewers in five games.

== Broadcasting ==
This was the second postseason under a seven-year U.S. rights agreement with Fox and TBS. TBS primarily aired all Division Series games, with sister network TNT used as an overflow channel. TBS also had the American League Championship Series. Fox televised the National League Championship Series and the World Series.
