= 2005 American League Championship Series =

36th edition of Major League Baseball's American League Championship Series

Team (Wins)	Managers	Season
Chicago White Sox (4)	Ozzie Guillén	99–63 (.611), GA: 6
Los Angeles Angels of Anaheim (1)	Mike Scioscia	95–67 (.586), GA: 7
- Dates: October 11–16
- MVP: Paul Konerko (Chicago)
- Umpires: Jerry Crawford, Doug Eddings, Ted Barrett, Ron Kulpa, Ed Rapuano, Randy Marsh

Broadcast
- Television: Fox (United States); MLB International (International)
- TV announcers: Joe Buck, Tim McCarver, Lou Piniella, and Chris Myers (Fox); Dave O'Brien and Rick Sutcliffe (MLB International)
- Radio: ESPN
- Radio announcers: Jon Miller and Joe Morgan
- ALDS: Chicago White Sox over Boston Red Sox (3–0); Los Angeles Angels of Anaheim over New York Yankees (3–2)

The 2005 American League Championship Series (ALCS) was a best-of-seven playoff in Major League Baseball's 2005 postseason pitting the top-seeded Chicago White Sox against the second-seeded Los Angeles Angels of Anaheim for the American League pennant. The Series began October 11 and ended on October 16. The White Sox had home-field advantage by virtue of having a better regular season record.

The White Sox won the series four games to one to become the American League champions, and faced the Houston Astros in the 2005 World Series, in which the White Sox swept the Astros in four games to win their first World Series championship in 88 years. The series was notable both for a controversial call in Game 2 of the series, and the outstanding pitching and durability of Chicago's starting rotation, pitching four consecutive complete games; the 2/3 of an inning Neal Cotts pitched in the first game was the only work the White Sox bullpen saw the entire series.

This was the first ALCS since 2002 not to feature the Red Sox or the Yankees.

== Summary ==
=== Chicago White Sox vs. Los Angeles Angels of Anaheim ===
Chicago won the series, 4–1.

Game	Date	Score	Location	Time	Attendance
1	October 11	Los Angeles Angels of Anaheim – 3, Chicago White Sox – 2	U.S. Cellular Field	2:47	40,659
2	October 12	Los Angeles Angels of Anaheim – 1, Chicago White Sox – 2	U.S. Cellular Field	2:34	41,013
3	October 14	Chicago White Sox – 5, Los Angeles Angels of Anaheim – 2	Angel Stadium of Anaheim	2:42	44,725
4	October 15	Chicago White Sox – 8, Los Angeles Angels of Anaheim – 2	Angel Stadium of Anaheim	2:46	44,857
5	October 16	Chicago White Sox – 6, Los Angeles Angels of Anaheim – 3	Angel Stadium of Anaheim	3:11	44,712

== Game summaries ==
=== Game 1 ===
October 11, 2005 7:19 pm (CDT) at U.S. Cellular Field in Chicago, Illinois 57 °F (14 °C), Overcast
Team	1	2	3	4	5	6	7	8	9	R	H	E
Los Angeles	0	1	2	0	0	0	0	0	0	3	7	1
Chicago	0	0	1	1	0	0	0	0	0	2	7	0
WP: Paul Byrd (1–0) LP: José Contreras (0–1) Sv: Francisco Rodríguez (1); Home runs: LAA: Garret Anderson (1); CWS: Joe Crede (1); Attendance: 40,659; Boxscore

In the series opener, the Los Angeles Angels of Anaheim won 3–2 in their third game in as many nights and as many cities. The Angels took the lead in the second inning on a Garret Anderson leadoff home run. Next inning, Steve Finley and Adam Kennedy hit back-to-back leadoff singles and advanced one base each on Chone Figgins's sacrifice bunt. Orlando Cabrera's single and Vladimir Guerrero's groundout scored a run each. White Sox starter José Contreras allowed no more runs, going 8 1/3 innings. In the bottom of the inning, Joe Crede's home run off of Paul Byrd put the Sox on the board. Next inning, Chicago's Carl Everett singled with one out, moved to second on a groundout, and scored on A. J. Pierzynski's single to make it a one-run game. However, neither team would score for the rest of the game. It was the first time in six tries that the Angels won a Game 1 under manager Mike Scioscia, despite having won the World Series in 2002. This turned out to be the only game the White Sox would lose in the entire postseason.

=== Game 2 ===
October 12, 2005 7:28 pm (CDT) at U.S. Cellular Field in Chicago, Illinois 61 °F (16 °C), Mostly Cloudy
Team	1	2	3	4	5	6	7	8	9	R	H	E
Los Angeles	0	0	0	0	1	0	0	0	0	1	5	3
Chicago	1	0	0	0	0	0	0	0	1	2	7	1
WP: Mark Buehrle (1–0) LP: Kelvim Escobar (0–1); Home runs: LAA: Robb Quinlan (1); CWS: None; Attendance: 41,013; Boxscore

Then-Senator and future President of the United States Barack Obama threw out the ceremonial first pitch. Behind a complete game from Mark Buehrle and a now infamous strikeout in the bottom of the ninth, the White Sox evened the series at a game apiece. In the bottom of the first, Scott Podsednik reached second on an error, moved to third on a sacrifice bunt, and scored on Jermaine Dye's ground out. Jarrod Washburn and two relievers held the Sox scoreless over the next seven innings while Robb Quinlan's fifth inning home run tied the game. It remained tied until the bottom of the ninth. With two strikes, A. J. Pierzynski swung and missed at a low pitch from Angels pitcher Kelvim Escobar for strike three. Josh Paul, the Angels catcher, rolled the ball to the mound and left the infield. Pierzynski realized strike three had been called, so he ran to first base in case the umpire ruled that the catcher had not legally caught the strike-three pitch (see Uncaught third strike rule). In a controversial call, home-plate umpire Doug Eddings ruled that the ball hit the ground before going into the catcher's glove and signalled strike 3 but did not call him out, so the pitch was considered uncaught and Pierzynski was safe at first. A pinch-runner, Pablo Ozuna, stole second base. Third baseman Joe Crede delivered a base hit three pitches later, scoring Ozuna for the winning run.

=== Game 3 ===
October 14, 2005 5:28 pm (PDT) at Angel Stadium of Anaheim in Anaheim, California 79 °F (26 °C), Mostly Clear
Team	1	2	3	4	5	6	7	8	9	R	H	E
Chicago	3	0	1	0	1	0	0	0	0	5	11	0
Los Angeles	0	0	0	0	0	2	0	0	0	2	4	0
WP: Jon Garland (1–0) LP: John Lackey (0–1); Home runs: CWS: Paul Konerko (1); LAA: Orlando Cabrera (1); Attendance: 44,725; Boxscore

Chicago jumped to a 3−0 lead in the first inning off of John Lackey as the series moved west to Anaheim. Scott Podsednik hit a leadoff single, moved to second on a sacrifice bunt and came home on Jermaine Dye's single before Paul Konerko's two-run home run capped the scoring. Tadahito Iguchi singled to lead off the third, moved to second on a walk, and scored on Carl Everett's single. Two innings later, Iguchi doubled with one out and scored on Konerko's two-out single to put Chicago up 5−0. A two-run home run by Orlando Cabrera in the sixth cut the lead to 5−2, but it would not be enough as the White Sox took the series lead, two games to one, with Jon Garland pitching a complete game.

=== Game 4 ===
October 15, 2005 5:16 pm (PDT) at Angel Stadium of Anaheim in Anaheim, California 64 °F (18 °C), Mostly Clear
Team	1	2	3	4	5	6	7	8	9	R	H	E
Chicago	3	0	1	1	1	0	0	2	0	8	8	1
Los Angeles	0	1	0	1	0	0	0	0	0	2	6	1
WP: Freddy García (1–0) LP: Ervin Santana (0–1); Home runs: CWS: Paul Konerko (2), A. J. Pierzynski (1); LAA: None; Attendance: 44,857; Boxscore

The visitors again jumped to a 3−0 lead in the first. Angel starter Ervin Santana walked Scott Podsednik and hit Tadahito Iguchi before Paul Konerko, after a disputed check swing on a 2–2 pitch, homered for the second straight game. The Angels cut it to 3−1 in the second when Darin Erstad walked with one out, moved to third on Casey Kotchman's single and White Sox pitcher Freddy Garcia's throwing error to first, then scored on Bengie Molina's single. With men on first and third, Steve Finley hit a ground ball to second for an inning-ending double play, but argued that Sox catcher A. J. Pierzynski had interfered with his swing. Chicago got that run back when Jermaine Dye reached on shortstop Orlando Cabrera's throwing error to first, stole second, and scored on Carl Everett's base hit. Pierzynski's home run next inning made it 5−1. In the bottom of the inning, Angel Garret Anderson singled with one out and scored on Kotchman's two-out double, but in the fifth, Podsednik drew a leadoff walk and after Scot Shields relieved Santana, stole second and scored on Everett's single. Esteban Yan walked Everett to lead off the eighth, allowed a subsequent double to Aaron Rowand followed by Joe Crede's two-run single to put the Sox up 8−2. García pitched the White Sox's third straight complete game, helping put them one win from their first World Series visit since 1959.

=== Game 5 ===
October 16, 2005 5:29 pm (PDT) at Angel Stadium of Anaheim in Anaheim, California 68 °F (20 °C), Mostly Cloudy
Team	1	2	3	4	5	6	7	8	9	R	H	E
Chicago	0	1	0	0	1	0	1	1	2	6	8	1
Los Angeles	0	0	1	0	2	0	0	0	0	3	5	2
WP: José Contreras (1–1) LP: Kelvim Escobar (0–2); Home runs: CWS: Joe Crede (2); LAA: None; Attendance: 44,712; Boxscore

Still on the road, Chicago struck first in Game 5 when Aaron Rowand hit a leadoff ground-rule double in the second off of Paul Byrd, moved to third on a sacrifice bunt, then scored on Joe Crede's sacrifice fly. But the Angels tied it in the third when Juan Rivera hit a leadoff double, moved to third on pitcher Jose Contreras's pickoff attempt error, and scored on Adam Kennedy's single. In the top of the fifth, Juan Uribe doubled and scored on Jermaine Dye's single, but in the bottom of the inning, Kennedy hit a leadoff single and scored on Chone Figgins's double. Figgins scored on a Garret Anderson sacrifice fly to put the Angels up 3−2. Crede's leadoff home run in the seventh off of Kelvim Escobar tied the game. Next inning, Escobar walked Rowand with two outs and an error moved him to second. Francisco Rodriguez relieved Escobar and Crede greeted him with an RBI single to put the White Sox up 4−3. They got two insurance runs in the ninth when Paul Konerko's double after back-to-back walks and Rowand's sacrifice fly scored a run each. Contreras delivered the fourth consecutive complete game by a White Sox pitcher, retiring the Angels in order in the ninth. Chicago captured its first American League pennant since 1959. This marked the first time in 77 years that a team threw four straight complete-game victories in the playoffs, becoming the first time it was done by four different pitchers since the Chicago Cubs did it in the 1907 World Series.

Konerko was named the ALCS MVP. He finished the series batting .286, with two home runs and seven RBIs. His two home runs came in the first innings of Games 3 and 4; he became only the third player in Major League history to hit homers in the first inning of consecutive playoff games, the other two having been Dan Ford during the 1979 ALCS and Carlos Beltrán during the 2004 NLCS.

== Composite box ==
2005 ALCS (4–1): Chicago White Sox over Los Angeles Angels of Anaheim

Team	1	2	3	4	5	6	7	8	9	R	H	E
Chicago White Sox	7	1	3	2	3	0	1	3	3	23	41	3
Los Angeles Angels of Anaheim	0	2	3	1	3	2	0	0	0	11	27	7
Total attendance: 215,966 Average attendance: 43,193

== Aftermath ==
Doug Eddings's controversial call in Game 2, when he ruled that a strikeout to A. J. Pierzynski by Kelvim Escobar had not been legally caught (an uncaught third strike) by catcher Josh Paul but made no audible call that the ball hit the ground, proved to be the most pivotal point in the series. At the team's ten-year anniversary in 2015, White Sox chairman Jerry Reinsdorf acknowledged that losing home-field advantage and going down 0–2 in a best-of-seven series would have been too difficult of a hole to climb out of. Catcher A. J. Pierzynski, who was at the center of the call, said the year before when he was in San Francisco, he was on the other end of that same type of play. Both Paul Konerko and general manager Kenny Williams believed that Eddings likely got the call wrong. According to umpire supervisor Rich Rieker, the replays showed "there was definitely a change in direction there" indicating the ball touched the ground and felt, at best, the replay was inconclusive. A. J. Pierzynski was booed every time he played in Anaheim until his retirement for his role in the controversy. Major League Baseball did not adopt review via instant replay on calls such as this until the 2014 season.

As of 2025, the White Sox in the 2005 ALCS are the only team to throw four complete games in a playoff series since the beginning of league championship series play in 1969. Prior to that, several teams had done so when the World Series was the only round of the MLB postseason.

As of the 2025 season, this is the last White Sox' AL Championship Series appearance. The Angels returned to the postseason in 2007, 2008, 2009, and 2014, but made it to an ALCS once, in 2009.
