= Joe Crede =

American baseball player (born 1978)

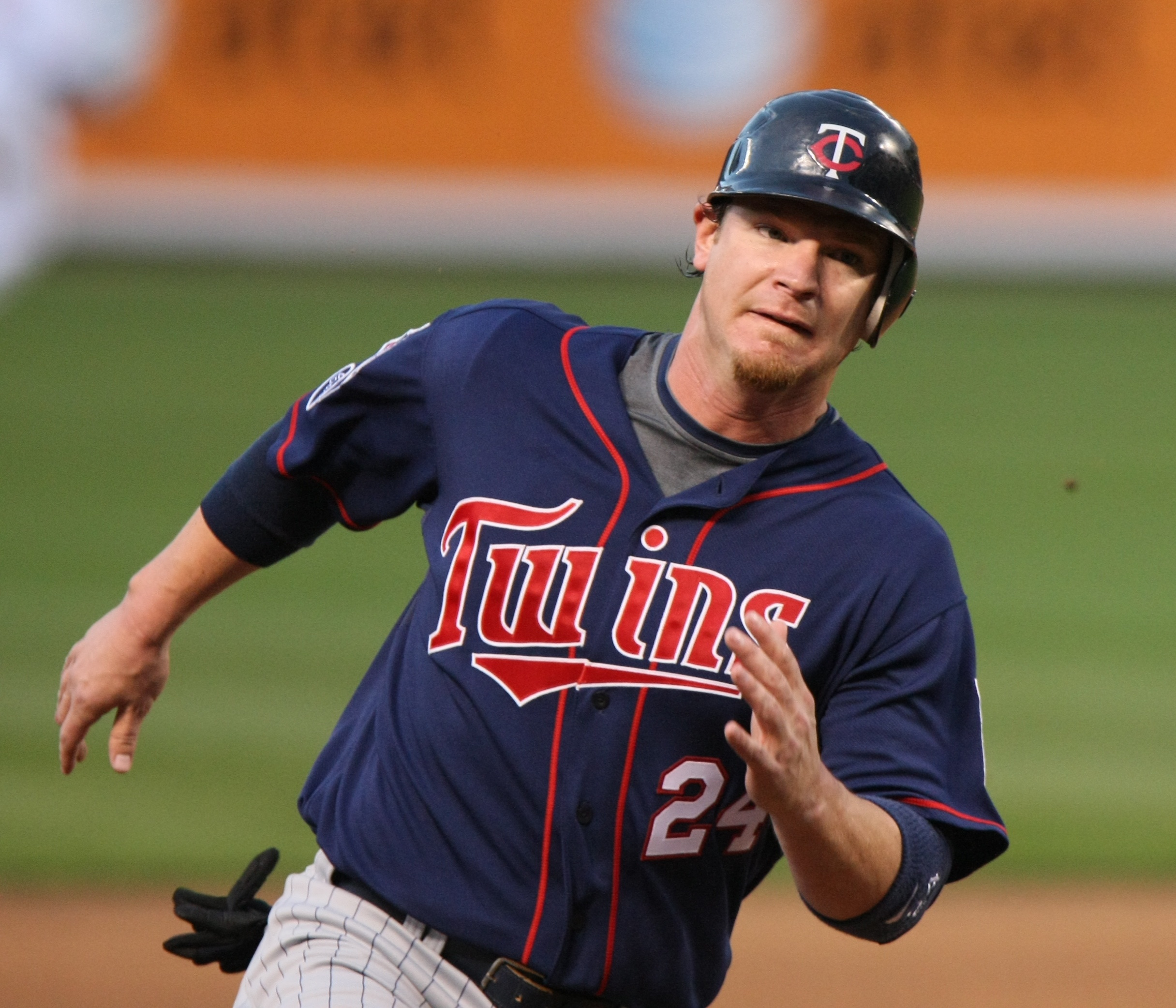
- Crede with the Minnesota Twins
- Third baseman
- Born: April 26, 1978 (age 48); Jefferson City, Missouri, U.S.
- Batted: Right Threw: Right

MLB debut
- September 12, 2000, for the Chicago White Sox

Last MLB appearance
- September 13, 2009, for the Minnesota Twins

MLB statistics
- Batting average: .254
- Home runs: 140
- Runs batted in: 470
- Stats at Baseball Reference

Teams
- Chicago White Sox (2000–2008); Minnesota Twins (2009)

Career highlights and awards
- All-Star (2008); World Series champion (2005); Silver Slugger Award (2006)

Joseph Taylor Crede (pronounced CREE-dee, born April 26, 1978) is an American former professional baseball third baseman. He played in Major League Baseball for the Chicago White Sox (2000–2008) and the Minnesota Twins (2009). Crede was drafted by the White Sox in the fifth round of the 1996 MLB draft and made his debut with the team in 2000.

Crede was a member of the White Sox when they won the World Series in 2005, marking their first championship in 88 years.

== Professional career ==
=== Chicago White Sox ===
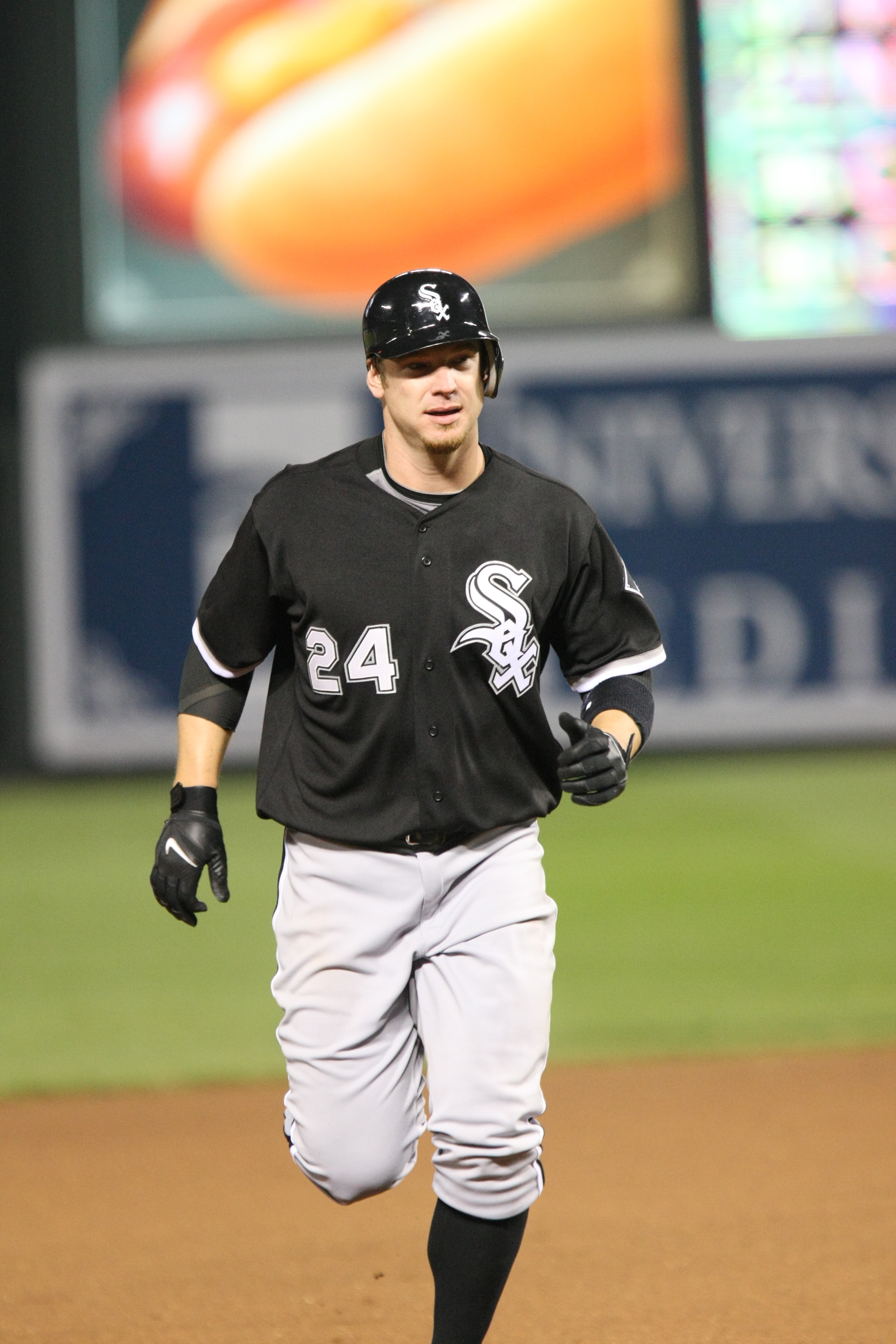
Crede with the Chicago White Sox on April 17, 2008

Crede made his major league debut on September 12, 2000 against the Detroit Tigers, entering as a defensive replacement at third base and flying out in his first at-bat. He split 2001 and 2002 between the majors and minors before playing in his first full season in 2003. In 2005, Crede batted .252 with 22 home runs and 62 RBI in 132 games. He also was a clutch performer in the playoffs, hitting several game winning hits during the White Sox World Series run. In 2006, he broke out with a career-high 30 home runs, 92 RBI and a .283 average in 150 games, winning the Silver Slugger Award for third base. In 2007, Crede was limited to 47 games due to injury, and finished the season batting just .216 with four home runs and 22 RBI.

On January 18, 2008, Crede agreed to a one-year, $5.1 million contract with the White Sox, avoiding arbitration. In 2008, Crede hit a grand slam on Opening Day against the Twins. For the week ending June 8th, Crede was named the co-American League Player of the Week (along with Milton Bradley) after going 11 for 18 with five home runs. After starting the season batting .256 with 16 home runs and 49 RBI, Crede made the 2008 MLB All-Star Game as a reserve. However, he was injured for most of the second half, and finished the season hitting .248 with 17 home runs and 55 RBI in 97 games. Both his 2007 and 2008 seasons had been cut short by back injuries. On October 30, 2008, Crede elected free agency.

=== Minnesota Twins ===
On February 21, 2009, Crede signed a one-year, $2.5 million contract with the Minnesota Twins that included incentives that could make the deal up to $7 million. In his one season with the Twins, Crede had a .225 batting average and recorded 15 home runs and 48 RBI in 90 games. On September 20, Crede announced he would undergo a third season-ending back surgery.

=== Colorado Rockies ===
Crede signed a minor league contract with an invitation to spring training with the Colorado Rockies after a one-year absence from baseball. He became a free agent on February 17, 2011, when he decided not to show up for spring training. Crede then retired.

== Personal life ==
On October 22, 2005, the same day as the due date of his second daughter, Lucy, Crede hit his first World Series home run. On November 6, 2005, Crede was honored by his hometown of Westphalia, Missouri, with "Joe Crede Day," where he was presented the key to the city. In February 2006, Crede's high school, Fatima High School in Westphalia, Missouri, retired his jersey. Joe's older brother, Brad, won a high school baseball state championship with Fatima High School in '92, and an NCAA Division II National Championship with CMSU in '94.

He was drafted by the Orioles after high school in the 44th round (1,220th overall) of the 1992 MLB draft, but chose to play in college first. He was drafted again after college by the Phillies in the 19th round (556th overall) of the 1996 MLB draft, the same day Joe was drafted.

Crede and his wife Lisa have two daughters, Anna and Lucy, and one son, Jace. He lives in mid-Missouri, and is a season-ticket holder for Missouri Tigers basketball.

Teammate Aaron Rowand praised Crede's ability to deliver in big moments. “There’s nobody better than that guy in the clutch,” Rowand told reporters. “He’s done it over and over and over again. It’s not the first time, and it definitely won’t be the last time.”
