= Uncaught third strike =

Baseball term

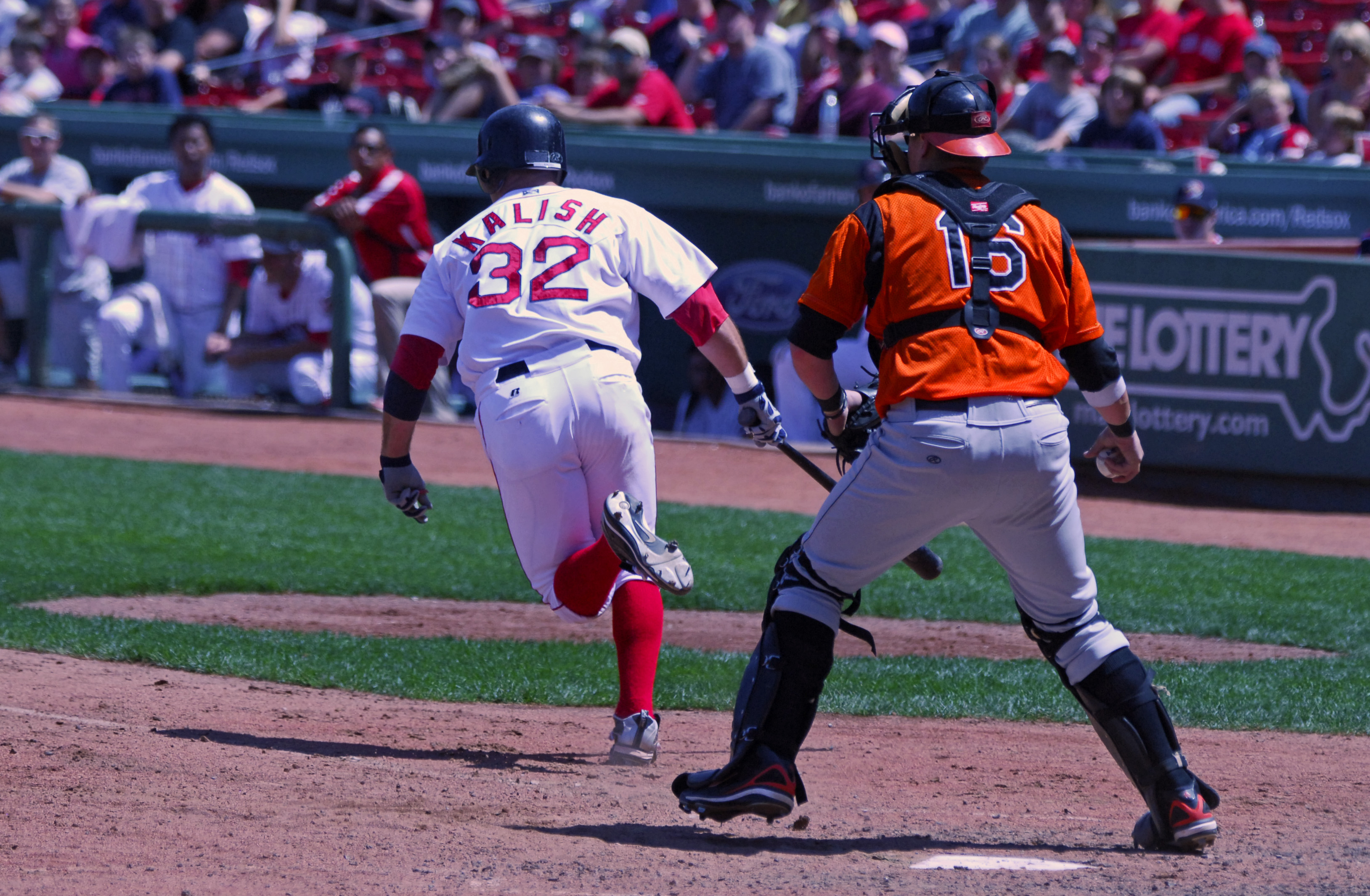
The batter Ryan Kalish attempting to advance to first base after an uncaught third strike, which the catcher has already retrieved and is about to throw to the first baseman to record the putout

In baseball and softball, an uncaught third strike (sometimes referred to as dropped third strike or non-caught third strike) occurs when the catcher fails to cleanly catch a pitch for the third strike of a plate appearance. In Major League Baseball (MLB), the specific rules concerning the uncaught third strike are addressed in Rules 5.05 and 5.09 of the Official Baseball Rules:

On an uncaught third strike with (1) no runner on first base, or (2) with two outs regardless of runners on base, the batter immediately becomes a runner. The strike is called, but the umpire does not call the batter out. The umpire may also signal that there is "no catch" of the pitch. The batter may then attempt to reach first base and must be tagged or forced out. With two outs and the bases loaded, the catcher who fails to catch the third strike may, upon picking up the ball, step on home plate for a force-out or make a throw to any other base in an effort to force out a runner. An "uncaught" strike includes not only pitches dropped by the catcher, but also pitches that hit the ground before the catcher attempts to catch it.

The purpose of the "no runner on first base or two outs" qualification is to prevent the catcher from deliberately dropping a third-strike pitch and then initiating an unfair double or triple play with possible force plays at second base, third base, or home plate, in addition to putting the batter out at first base. The logic of the situation is similar to that which led to the infield fly rule.

Regardless of the outcome of an uncaught third strike, the pitcher is statistically credited with a strikeout, and the batter, conversely, is statistically charged with having been struck out. In an infamous example, on September 28, 2019, Kole Calhoun reached base on Justin Verlander's 3000th career strikeout, and then scored on Andrelton Simmons's home run immediately thereafter. Because of the uncaught third strike rule, it is possible for a pitcher to register more than three strikeouts in an inning. Numerous pitchers have recorded four strikeouts in an inning in an official MLB game, though no five-strikeout innings have ever occurred.

A dropped third strike where the batter reaches first would count as a runner reaching first and thus break up a perfect game, but would still count towards a no-hitter. This has happened once in MLB history, as on May 5, 2021, John Means of the Baltimore Orioles threw a no-hitter against the Seattle Mariners, striking out 12 batters while facing the minimum of 27 batters; his only baserunner, Sam Haggerty, reached on a dropped third strike in the third inning by catcher Pedro Severino and was subsequently caught trying to steal second base.

In Little League, in the Tee-Ball and Minor League divisions, the batter is out after the third strike regardless of whether the pitched ball is caught cleanly by the catcher. In Little League (or the Major Division), Junior, Senior, and Big League divisions, a batter may attempt to advance to first base on an uncaught third strike. Little League Major Division Softball and many other youth baseball leagues (such as the USSSA) also follow the rule.

== History ==
The uncaught third strike rule is one of the oldest in baseball, being codified in the Knickerbocker Rules of 1845: "Three balls being struck at and missed and the last one caught, is a hand-out."

The rule goes back even further, though. A 1796 German book on recreational games for youth contained a chapter on "English Base-ball" which describes a similar rule. The point then was that even an inept batter who failed to hit the softly-tossed ball on three swings would be given a chance to run the bases anyway, so the ball was in play after his third miss (there were no called strikes) and he could make for first base. There might be no catcher in the game, and if there was he would stand well behind the batter and catch strikes on the bounce (balls were pitched in a gentle arc), so there was no question of the ball being caught; rather it would be fielded and put into play. There were no fielding gloves, and errors were common, so the batter's chance of reaching first base safely was not negligible.

This rule continues in baseball today, but catcher became a required position, and starting in the mid-19th century, catchers began moving up to their current position directly behind home plate so as to catch pitches (now following a flatter trajectory) directly on the fly. Thus the rule became mostly vestigial and its original children's-game purpose forgotten. But still to this day, a third strike is treated as if in play, but now only for the fraction of a second between when the strike occurs and the catcher fields it (if he does). This is why the catcher is given credit on the putout in strikeouts, as with any fielder who catches a ball in play on the fly. But if the catcher doesn't field it cleanly, the ball is still in play like any other ball missed by a fielder.

=== 2006 rule change ===
Following a controversial play involving this rule in the ninth inning of Game 2 of the 2005 American League Championship Series, the application of the rule was changed when a comment was added in 2006 to Rule 6.09(b) (After rule numbering changes, Rule 5.09(a)(2) Comment):

Rule 5.05(a)(2) Comment: A batter who does not realize his situation on a third strike not caught, and who is not in the process of running to first base, shall be declared out once he leaves the dirt circle surrounding home plate.

This comment represents the official interpretation of the application of the rule. Prior to this rule change, a batter was able to try for first at any time before entering the dugout. The new rule would not have affected the controversial play referenced above, as the batter had not left the dirt circle.
