= Mark Buehrle's perfect game =

2009 Major League Baseball game

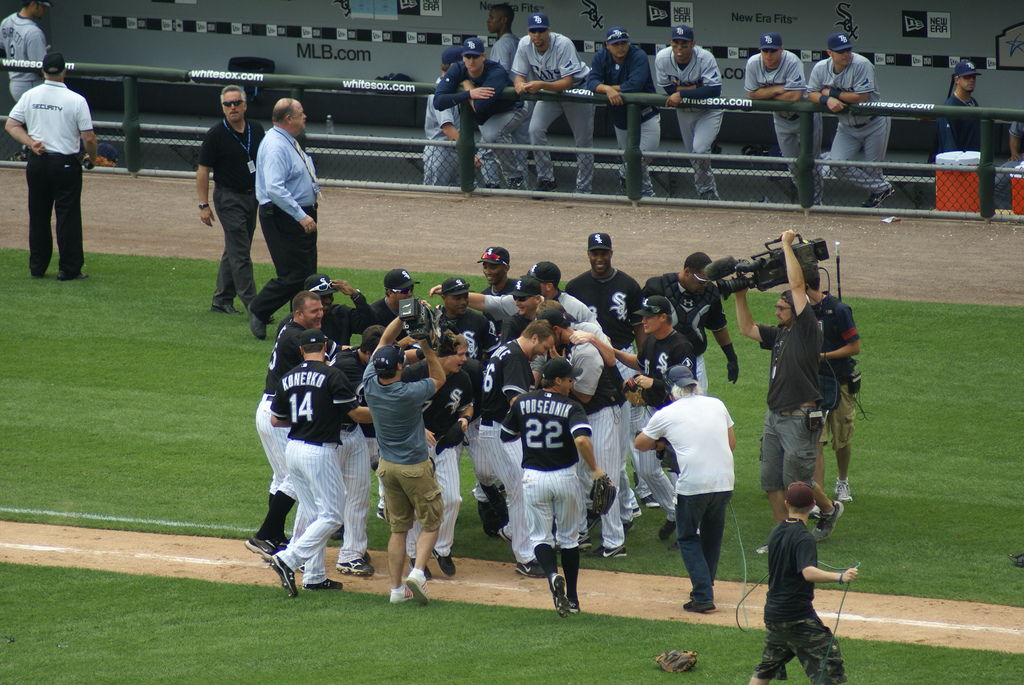
- Chicago White Sox teammates celebrating following the final out of Mark Buehrle's perfect game.
Tampa Bay Rays	Chicago White Sox
0	5
	1	2	3	4	5	6	7	8	9	R	H	E
Tampa Bay Rays	0	0	0	0	0	0	0	0	0	0	0	0
Chicago White Sox	0	4	0	0	1	0	0	0	x	5	6	0
- Date: July 23, 2009
- Venue: U. S. Cellular Field
- City: Chicago, Illinois
- Managers: Joe Maddon (Tampa Bay Rays); Ozzie Guillén (Chicago White Sox)
- Umpires: HP: Eric Cooper; 1B: Mike Reilly; 2B: Chuck Meriwether; 3B: Laz Díaz
- Attendance: 28,036
- Television: Comcast SportsNet Chicago
- TV announcers: Ken Harrelson (play-by-play); Steve Stone (color commentary)
- Radio: WSCR
- Radio announcers: Ed Farmer (play-by-play); Darrin Jackson (color commentary)

On July 23, 2009, Mark Buehrle of the Chicago White Sox pitched a perfect game against the Tampa Bay Rays at U. S. Cellular Field (now Rate Field) in Chicago, Illinois in front of 28,036 fans. The game occurred from 1:07 PM CT to 3:10 PM CT, lasting 2 hours and 3 minutes, the shortest perfect game since Tom Browning's on September 16, 1988, which lasted 1 hour and 51 minutes.

It was the 18th perfect game and 263rd no-hitter in MLB history, and the second perfect game and 17th no-hitter in White Sox history. The most recent perfect game at the time was on May 18, 2004, when Randy Johnson of the Arizona Diamondbacks pitched a perfect game against the Atlanta Braves at Turner Field. The last time a White Sox pitcher threw a perfect game was on April 30, 1922, when Charlie Robertson pitched a perfecto against the Detroit Tigers at Navin Field (later known as Tiger Stadium); that was the fifth perfect game in MLB history.

Buehrle also logged his second career no-hitter; the first was against the Texas Rangers on April 18, 2007. He became the first pitcher to throw multiple no-hitters since Johnson. Buehrle did this in the midst of setting a Major League record by retiring 45 consecutive batters over three games.

The umpire, Eric Cooper, who stood behind the plate for this perfect game was the same home plate umpire when Buehrle threw his first career no-hitter. Ramón Castro was the catcher, the first time Buehrle and he had been battery mates. Buehrle did not once shake off Castro throughout the game.

At the time, the Rays were tied for the second-highest on-base percentage (.343) of any team, so they were one of the least likely to allow a perfect game. Buehrle's perfect game was to become the first of three perfect games and the first of four no-hitters allowed by the Rays in less than three years:

- the second was delivered by Dallas Braden of the Oakland Athletics on May 9, 2010 (Mother's Day)
- the third was pitched by Edwin Jackson of the Arizona Diamondbacks on June 25, 2010
- and the fourth, which meant the Rays tied the Dodgers as the only MLB franchise to allow three perfect games, being delivered by Félix Hernández on August 15, 2012.

== Background ==
=== 1998 draft and Major League debut ===
Mark Buehrle was a 38th round pick and 1139th overall in 1998 draft pick by the White Sox. Buehrle made his major league debut on July 16, 2000, pitching one inning of relief while allowing a run to Milwaukee Brewers. Then he made his first starting appearance on July 19, pitching seven innings while allowing six hits and two runs to Minnesota Twins.

=== First career no-hitter ===
On April 18, 2007 against the Texas Rangers at U.S. Cellular Field, Mark Buehrle threw his first career no-hitter. In that game, he threw 106 pitches and faced the minimum 27 batters, while allowing just one walk to Sammy Sosa in the fifth inning and one out after a 3–1 pitch. He was promptly picked off from first base while facing the next batter.

This was the 16th no-hitter in White Sox history, the first one since August 11, 1991 when Wilson Álvarez threw one at Memorial Stadium against the Baltimore Orioles and first at home since September 10, 1967 when Joel Horlen threw one against the Detroit Tigers.

=== 2009 campaign ===
Mark Buehrle was the 2009 Opening Day starter, which he took the victory as the Sox beat the Royals 4–2. Buehrle won five straight decisions to start the 2009 season. His record stood at 9–3 before the All-Star break, and he was voted to the All-Star Game in Busch Stadium in St. Louis near his hometown, where he pitched a perfect third. On June 14, he hit the first and only home run of his career in a road game against the Milwaukee Brewers at Miller Park. After completing his perfect game, Buehrle had an 11–3 pitching record with a 3.28 ERA. Buehrle struggled in the games following the perfect game and he did not achieve another win until September 7 against the Red Sox. On September 30 in the second game of the doubleheader, Buehrle pitched his final game of the season at Cleveland and he took the victory when the Sox shutout Cleveland 1–0. After his perfecto till the end of his 2009 campaign, he posted a 2–7 record with a 4.78 ERA and he finished the season 13–10 with a 3.84 ERA. He became the only active player to pitch for least two hundred innings for nine consecutive seasons after his debut in 2000.

=== 2010 Opening Day and play of the season ===
Buehrle was named the 2010 Opening Day starter for a franchise-record eighth time. In that game, he pitched seven innings and allowed no earned runs. Incredibly, in the fifth inning, he made a spectacular play facing Lou Marson of the Cleveland Indians. Marson hit a ball which bounced off Buehrle's foot, and he managed to pick it up with his glove and immediately throw it backwards between his legs without looking back and 1st baseman Paul Konerko caught the ball with his bare hand for the second out of the inning. This is the #1 play of the season as no other plays beat Buehrle for the remaining six months of the 2010 regular season. In the show Baseball Tonight, the "Buehrle-Meter" is used to estimate the performance of the #1 Web Gems from 1–10 where 10 is just as spectacular as Mark Buehrle's spectacular play on April 5, 2010.

== Game ==
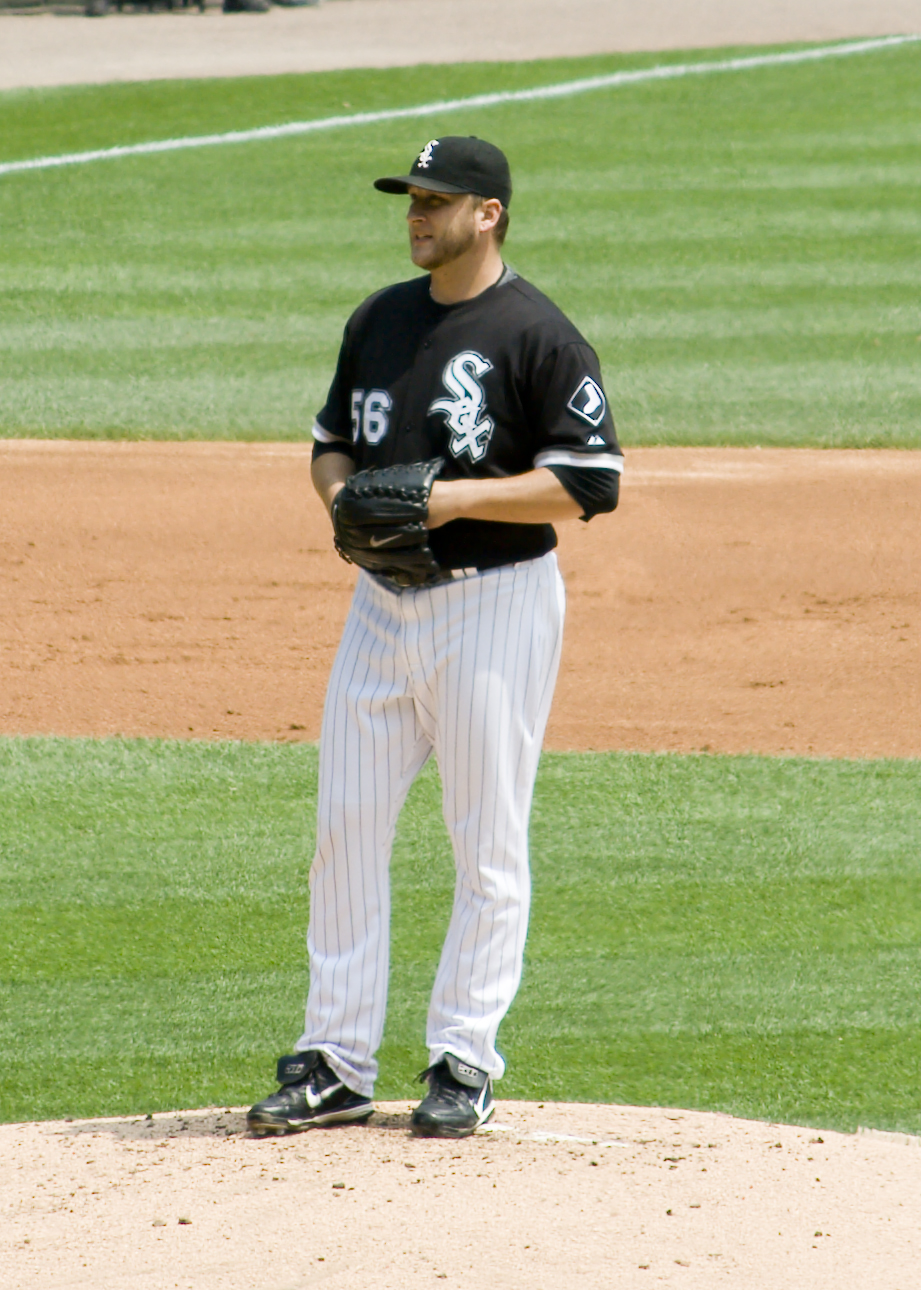
Buehrle receiving a sign during the perfect game

In the bottom of the second inning with two outs and a 3–1 pitch, Josh Fields hit a grand slam off of Scott Kazmir, giving the White Sox a 4–0 lead. In the bottom of the fifth inning, Scott Podsednik hit a lead-off double. The next batter, Alexei Ramírez, scored Podsednik from second with a double of his own, making it a 5–0 White Sox lead.

Two of the Rays batters hit a foul ball very close to the fair territory down the left field line. Five of the Rays hitters had full (3–2) counts.

=== Ninth inning ===
In the top of the ninth inning, the Rays' leadoff hitter, Gabe Kapler, hit a deep fly ball to left field-center field, where DeWayne Wise made a spectacular catch, taking a home run away from Kapler and saving the perfect game for Buehrle. Wise was a defensive replacement prior to the ninth inning. The next batter, Michel Hernández, struck out swinging on a changeup with a full (3–2) count. The final batter, Jason Bartlett, hit a ground ball to shortstop Alexei Ramírez, who threw it to first baseman Josh Fields (Paul Konerko was the designated hitter for the day) to finish off the history-making moment at 3:10 PM CT.

== Game statistics ==
=== Linescore ===
Team	1	2	3	4	5	6	7	8	9	R	H	E
Tampa Bay Rays (52–44)	0	0	0	0	0	0	0	0	0	0	0	0
Chicago White Sox (50–45)	0	4	0	0	1	0	0	0	X	5	6	0
WP: Mark Buehrle (11–3) LP: Scott Kazmir (4–6); Home runs: TB: None; CWS: Josh Fields (7)

=== Box score ===
Tampa Bay	AB	R	H	RBI	BB	SO	LOB	AVG
B.J. Upton, CF	3	0	0	0	0	1	0	.238
Carl Crawford, LF	3	0	0	0	0	0	0	.310
Evan Longoria, 3B	3	0	0	0	0	1	0	.273
Carlos Peña, 1B	3	0	0	0	0	1	0	.222
Ben Zobrist, 2B	3	0	0	0	0	1	0	.300
Pat Burrell, DH	3	0	0	0	0	1	0	.229
Gabe Kapler, RF	3	0	0	0	0	0	0	.250
Michel Hernández, C	3	0	0	0	0	1	0	.247
Jason Bartlett, SS	3	0	0	0	0	0	0	.338
Totals	27	0	0	0	0	6	0	.268

Tampa Bay	IP	H	R	ER	BB	SO	HR	ERA
Scott Kazmir (L, 4–6)	6	5	5	5	3	5	1	6.69
Lance Cormier	1	1	0	0	0	0	0	2.65
Dale Thayer	1	0	0	0	0	1	0	4.26
Totals	8	6	5	5	3	6	1	4.16

Chicago	AB	R	H	RBI	BB	SO	LOB	AVG
Scott Podsednik, CF–LF	4	1	1	0	0	1	0	.305
Alexei Ramírez, SS	3	0	2	1	1	0	0	.283
Jermaine Dye, RF	4	0	0	0	0	1	3	.293
Paul Konerko, DH	4	1	1	0	0	0	3	.295
Carlos Quentin, LF	3	1	0	0	1	0	2	.228
DeWayne Wise, CF	0	0	0	0	0	0	0	.196
Gordon Beckham, 3B	4	0	0	0	0	1	2	.291
Jayson Nix, 2B	3	0	0	0	0	2	2	.220
Ramón Castro, C	2	1	1	0	1	1	1	.225
Josh Fields, 1B	3	1	1	4	0	0	2	.223
Totals	30	5	6	5	3	6	15	.263

BATTING

- 2B: Podsednik (12, Kazmir), Ramirez, A (11, Kazmir)
- HR: Fields (7, 2nd inning off Kazmir, 3 on, 2 out)
- TB: Podsednik 2; Ramirez, A 3; Konerko; Castro, R; Fields 4
- RBI: Fields 4 (30), Ramirez, A (47)
- 2-out RBI: Fields 4
- Runners left in scoring position, 2 out: Quentin; Konerko
- Team RISP: 3-for-9
- Team LOB: 5

Chicago	IP	H	R	ER	BB	SO	HR	ERA
Mark Buehrle (W, 11–3)	9	0	0	0	0	6	0	3.28
Totals	9	0	0	0	0	6	0	4.15

=== Other info ===
- HBP: Nix, J by Kazmir
- Pitches-strikes: Kazmir 98–65, Cormier 20–11, Thayer, D 10–7, Buehrle 116–76
- Groundouts-flyouts: Kazmir 2–11, Cormier 3–0, Thayer, D 0–2, Buehrle 11–10
- Batters faced: Kazmir 27, Cormier 4, Thayer, D 3, Buehrle 27
- Umpires: HP – Eric Cooper, 1B – Mike Reilly, 2B – Chuck Meriwether, 3B – Laz Díaz
- Weather: 69 °F (38 °C), sunny
- Wind: 7 mph, L to R
- Time of first pitch: 1:07 PM CT
- Time: 2:03
- Attendance: 28,036
- Venue: U.S. Cellular Field

=== Play by play ===
Score	Out	RoB	Pit(cnt)	Batter	Pitcher	Play description
1st inning for Rays
0–0	0	◊^{◊}◊	1,(0–0)	CF B.J. Upton	Mark Buehrle	Groundout: 2B-1B
0–0	1	◊^{◊}◊	5,(1–2)	LF Carl Crawford	Mark Buehrle	Groundout: P-1B
0–0	2	◊^{◊}◊	4,(1–2)	3B Evan Longoria	Mark Buehrle	Strikeout Swinging
1st inning for White Sox
0–0	0	◊^{◊}◊	4,(1–2)	CF Scott Podsednik	Scott Kazmir	Strikeout Looking
0–0	1	◊^{◊}◊	1,(0–0)	SS Alexei Ramírez	Scott Kazmir	Flyout: LF (Short LF-CF)
0–0	2	◊^{◊}◊	5,(2–2)	RF Jermaine Dye	Scott Kazmir	Flyout: LF (Deep LF Line)
2nd inning for Rays
0–0	0	◊^{◊}◊	7,(3–2)	1B Carlos Peña	Mark Buehrle	Foulout: 1B (1B Foul)
0–0	1	◊^{◊}◊	6,(2–2)	2B Ben Zobrist	Mark Buehrle	Strikeout Swinging
0–0	2	◊^{◊}◊	5,(2–2)	DH Pat Burrell	Mark Buehrle	Flyout: RF (Deep CF-RF)
2nd inning for White Sox
0–0	0	◊^{◊}◊	4,(1–2)	DH Paul Konerko	Scott Kazmir	Single to RF (Line Drive to Short RF)
0–0	0	◊^{◊}◊	5,(3–1)	LF Carlos Quentin	Scott Kazmir	Walk; Konerko to 2B
0–0	0	◊^{◊}◊	6,(3–2)	3B Gordon Beckham	Scott Kazmir	Strikeout Swinging
0–0	1	◊^{◊}◊	8,(3–2)	2B Jayson Nix	Scott Kazmir	Strikeout Swinging
0–0	2	◊^{◊}◊	3,(0–2)	C Ramón Castro	Scott Kazmir	Single to LF (Line Drive); Konerko to 3B; Quentin to 2B
0–0	2	◊^{◊}◊	5,(3–1)	1B Josh Fields	Scott Kazmir	Home Run (Flyball to Deep LF); Konerko Scores; Quentin Scores; Castro Scores
4–0	2	◊^{◊}◊	3,(0–2)	CF Scott Podsednik	Scott Kazmir	Groundout: SS-1B (Weak SS)
3rd inning for Rays
0–4	0	◊^{◊}◊	7,(2–2)	RF Gabe Kapler	Mark Buehrle	Flyout: LF (LF-CF)
0–4	1	◊^{◊}◊	3,(0–2)	C Michel Hernández	Mark Buehrle	Groundout: SS-1B (Weak SS-2B)
0–4	2	◊^{◊}◊	1,(0–0)	SS Jason Bartlett	Mark Buehrle	Flyout: LF (LF-CF)
3rd inning for White Sox
4–0	0	◊^{◊}◊	8,(3–2)	SS Alexei Ramírez	Scott Kazmir	Walk
4–0	0	◊^{◊}◊	2,(0–1)	RF Jermaine Dye	Scott Kazmir	Flyout: RF (Deep 2B-1B)
4–0	1	◊^{◊}◊	2,(0–1)	DH Paul Konerko	Scott Kazmir	Flyout: CF (Deep CF-RF)
4–0	2	◊^{◊}◊	1,(0–0)	LF Carlos Quentin	Scott Kazmir	Flyout: CF (Deep CF)
4th inning for Rays
0–4	0	◊^{◊}◊	6,(3–2)	CF B.J. Upton	Mark Buehrle	Strikeout Swinging
0–4	1	◊^{◊}◊	3,(1–1)	LF Carl Crawford	Mark Buehrle	Flyout: LF
0–4	2	◊^{◊}◊	2,(0–1)	3B Evan Longoria	Mark Buehrle	Lineout: SS (Weak SS)
4th inning for White Sox
4–0	0	◊^{◊}◊	2,(0–1)	3B Gordon Beckham	Scott Kazmir	Flyout: LF (LF-CF)
4–0	1	◊^{◊}◊	4,(1–2)	2B Jayson Nix	Scott Kazmir	Flyout: RF (Short CF-RF)
4–0	2	◊^{◊}◊	6,(3–2)	C Ramón Castro	Scott Kazmir	Walk
4–0	2	◊^{◊}◊	3,(1–1)	1B Josh Fields	Scott Kazmir	Flyout: CF (Deep CF)
5th inning for Rays
0–4	0	◊^{◊}◊	4,(2–1)	1B Carlos Peña	Mark Buehrle	Groundout: 1B-P (2B-1B)
0–4	1	◊^{◊}◊	1,(0–0)	2B Ben Zobrist	Mark Buehrle	Groundout: SS-1B (Weak SS)
0–4	2	◊^{◊}◊	5,(2–2)	DH Pat Burrell	Mark Buehrle	Strikeout Swinging
5th inning for White Sox
4–0	0	◊^{◊}◊	1,(0–0)	CF Scott Podsednik	Scott Kazmir	Double to RF (Ground Ball)
4–0	0	◊^{◊}◊	2,(0–1)	SS Alexei Ramírez	Scott Kazmir	Double to RF (Ground Ball); Podsednik Scores
5–0	0	◊^{◊}◊	5,(1–2)	RF Jermaine Dye	Scott Kazmir	Strikeout Swinging
5–0	1	◊^{◊}◊	2,(0–1)	DH Paul Konerko	Scott Kazmir	Flyout: LF (Deep LF-CF)
5–0	2	◊^{◊}◊	2,(0–1)	LF Carlos Quentin	Scott Kazmir	Groundout: 2B-1B
6th inning for Rays
0–5	0	◊^{◊}◊	3,(2–0)	RF Gabe Kapler	Mark Buehrle	Groundout: 3B-1B (Weak 3B)
0–5	1	◊^{◊}◊	4,(0–2)	C Michel Hernández	Mark Buehrle	Groundout: 3B-1B (Weak SS)
0–5	2	◊^{◊}◊	7,(3–2)	SS Jason Bartlett	Mark Buehrle	Groundout: SS-1B (Weak SS)
6th inning for White Sox
5–0	0	◊^{◊}◊	2,(1–0)	3B Gordon Beckham	Scott Kazmir	Popout: 1B (P's Left)
5–0	1	◊^{◊}◊	2,(0–1)	2B Jayson Nix	Scott Kazmir	Hit By Pitch
5–0	1	◊^{◊}◊	6,(2–2)	C Ramón Castro	Scott Kazmir	Strikeout Looking
5–0	2	◊^{◊}◊	4,(1–2)	1B Josh Fields	Scott Kazmir	Flyout: LF (LF-CF)
7th inning for Rays
0–5	0	◊^{◊}◊	4,(2–1)	CF B.J. Upton	Mark Buehrle	Groundout: SS-1B (Weak SS)
0–5	1	◊^{◊}◊	4,(2–1)	LF Carl Crawford	Mark Buehrle	Groundout: P-1B (P's Left)
0–5	2	◊^{◊}◊	1,(0–0)	3B Evan Longoria	Mark Buehrle	Flyout: RF (Deep RF)
7th inning for White Sox
5–0	0	◊^{◊}◊	6,(3–2)	CF Scott Podsednik	Lance Cormier	Groundout: P-1B (Weak 2B)
5–0	1	◊^{◊}◊	2,(0–1)	SS Alexei Ramírez	Lance Cormier	Single to LF (Line Drive to LF-CF)
5–0	1	◊^{◊}◊	6,(3–2)	RF Jermaine Dye	Lance Cormier	Groundout: 3B-1B (Weak 3B); Ramírez to 2B
5–0	2	◊^{◊}◊	6,(3–2)	DH Paul Konerko	Lance Cormier	Groundout: 3B-1B (Weak 3B)
8th inning for Rays
0–5	0	◊^{◊}◊	3,(0–2)	1B Carlos Peña	Mark Buehrle	Strikeout Looking
0–5	1	◊^{◊}◊	7,(3–2)	2B Ben Zobrist	Mark Buehrle	Foulout: 3B (3B Foul)
0–5	2	◊^{◊}◊	7,(2–2)	DH Pat Burrell	Mark Buehrle	Lineout: 3B (Weak 3B)
8th inning for White Sox
5–0	0	◊^{◊}◊	2,(1–0)	LF Carlos Quentin	Dale Thayer	Flyout: CF (Deep CF)
5–0	1	◊^{◊}◊	3,(0–2)	3B Gordon Beckham	Dale Thayer	Flyout: LF (Deep LF)
5–0	2	◊^{◊}◊	5,(2–2)	2B Jayson Nix	Dale Thayer	Strikeout Looking
9th inning for Rays
0–5	0	◊^{◊}◊	6,(2–2)	RF Gabe Kapler	Mark Buehrle	Flyout: CF (Deep LF-CF)
0–5	1	◊^{◊}◊	6,(3–2)	C Michel Hernández	Mark Buehrle	Strikeout Swinging
0–5	2	◊^{◊}◊	4,(2–1)	SS Jason Bartlett	Mark Buehrle	Groundout: SS-1B (Weak SS)

== Broadcaster’s reactions ==
As Buehrle exited the field after the eighth inning, White Sox broadcaster Ken Harrelson, calling the game on Comcast SportsNet Chicago, exclaimed "Call your sons! Call your daughters! Call your friends! Call your neighbors! Mark Buehrle has a perfect game going into the ninth!"

When DeWayne Wise made the catch, Harrelson called out: "That ball hit deep into left center field. Wise back, back. Makes the catch! DeWayne Wise makes the catch! What a play by Wise! Mercy! A great catch! By DeWayne Wise!" Upon watching the replay of Wise's catch, Harrelson declared it was "under the circumstances, one of the greatest catches I have ever seen in 50 years in this game."

As the final ground ball of the game rolled towards White Sox shortstop Alexei Ramírez, Harrelson called out: "Alexei?!" As Ramirez completed the throw to first baseman Josh Fields, Harrelson shouted, "Yes! Yes! Yes! Yes! Yes! History!" After a long pause, Harrelson continued, "A perfect game by Mark Buehrle! And what an unbelievable, unbelievable play by DeWayne Wise!"

Though many did not like Harrelson’s verbosity and obvious hometown boosterism at the concluding moment of the game, others felt the outburst of emotion captured exactly what they were feeling as the perfect game was sealed.

== Aftermath ==
With the final out, the White Sox players ran onto the field, hugging each other. President Barack Obama, an ardent White Sox supporter, called Buehrle to congratulate him on his perfect game. Then his wife Jamie and her baby daughter Brooklyn came to the U.S. Cellular Field from their home in suburban Chicago to congratulate Mark. Buehrle's reaction was putting his glove on his head in shock before receiving hugs from his teammates.

On July 29, 2009, Mark threw 5 2/3 perfect innings. By retiring former teammate Joe Crede, Buehrle set the new record for consecutive batters retired, beating Jim Barr (who had retired 41 consecutive batters over the course of two complete-game wins in 1971, from the third inning of one to the seventh inning of the next) and teammate Bobby Jenks (who had tied Barr’s mark over 14 relief appearances in 2007). Buehrle would then go on to retire the next three batters, before walking Minnesota Twin Alexi Casilla with two outs in the sixth inning, thus foiling Buehrle’s chance of becoming the first pitcher to ever throw a second career perfect game – let alone consecutive perfect games. Denard Span followed Casilla with a single, thus foiling Buehrle’s chance of becoming the second pitcher to throw consecutive no-hitters (the first having been Johnny Vander Meer for the 1938 Reds); in fact, Buehrle allowed 5 runs in 6 1/3 innings and took the loss on July 29. Combined with the last out of one appearance, his perfect game, and the 5 2/3 innings worth of perfection, Mark set the new record of 45 consecutive batters retired. This mark was broken by Yusmeiro Petit with 46 over eight appearances in 2014.

On July 29, 2009 Illinois Governor Pat Quinn declared July 30 "Mark Buehrle Day". On August 4 before the game against the Los Angeles Angels, the White Sox held a special ceremony and provided "perfect game" and "MLB Record-Setting" giveaways for fans attending the Sox-Angels series. This series against the Angels was called "The Buehrle Appreciation Series".

The left-center field wall where Wise made his ninth-inning home run-robbing catch is marked with the text, "The Catch".
