= 2002 Major League Baseball All-Star Game =

2002 American baseball competition

	1	2	3	4	5	6	7	8	9	10	11	R	H	E
American League	0	0	0	1	1	0	4	1	0	0	0	7	12	0
National League	0	1	3	0	1	0	2	0	0	0	0	7	13	0
- Date: July 9, 2002
- Venue: Miller Park
- City: Milwaukee, Wisconsin
- Managers: Joe Torre (NYY); Bob Brenly (ARI)
- Attendance: 41,871
- Ceremonial first pitch: Warren Spahn, Hank Aaron, Robin Yount and Paul Molitor
- Television: Fox (United States); MLB International (International)
- TV announcers: Joe Buck and Tim McCarver (Fox); Gary Thorne and Ken Singleton (MLB International)
- Radio: ESPN
- Radio announcers: Dan Shulman and Dave Campbell

The 2002 Major League Baseball All-Star Game was the 73rd playing of the midsummer classic between the all-stars of the American League (AL) and National League (NL), the two leagues that make up Major League Baseball. The game was held on July 9, 2002 at Miller Park, now named American Family Field, in Milwaukee, Wisconsin, the home of the Milwaukee Brewers of the NL. The game controversially ended with a 7–7 tie due to both teams running out of available pitchers after 11 innings.

In an attempt to prevent future ties, a rule change was made in 2003 to award home field advantage in the World Series to the league that won the All Star game. In 2017 that rule was eliminated and home field advantage was instead awarded to the team with the higher winning percentage.

Since 2022, games can end in a tie after nine innings, with a Home Run Derby-like swing-off consisting of three rounds, three players per league, and three swings per player for their league's home run total to determine the winner of the All-Star Game. The 2025 game was the second All-Star Game to officially end in a tie of 6–6 after nine innings, with the National League won the Home Run Derby-like swing-off tiebreaker at 4–3.

No player was awarded the Most Valuable Player (MVP) Award due to the game ending in a tie. The roster selection for the 2002 game marked the inaugural All-Star Final Vote competition (then known as "The All-Star 30th Man" competition). Johnny Damon and Andruw Jones represented the American and National Leagues as a result of this contest.

== Rosters ==
Players in italics have since been inducted into the National Baseball Hall of Fame.

=== Final roster spot ===
Player	Team	Pos.	Player	Team	Pos.
American League			National League		
Johnny Damon	BOS	CF	Andruw Jones	ATL	CF
Jim Thome	CLE	1B	Brian Giles	PIT	RF
Eric Chavez	OAK	3B	Larry Walker	COL	RF
Magglio Ordóñez	CHW	RF	Albert Pujols	STL	1B
Darin Erstad	ANA	CF	Ryan Klesko	SD	1B

=== American League ===
Starters
Position	Player	Team	All-Star Games
P	Derek Lowe	Red Sox	2
C	Jorge Posada	Yankees	3
1B	Jason Giambi	Yankees	3
2B	Alfonso Soriano	Yankees	1
3B	Shea Hillenbrand	Red Sox	1
SS	Alex Rodriguez	Rangers	6
OF	Manny Ramírez	Red Sox	6
OF	Torii Hunter	Twins	1
OF	Ichiro Suzuki	Mariners	2

Pitchers
Position	Player	Team	All-Star Games
P	Mark Buehrle	White Sox	1
P	Roy Halladay	Blue Jays	1
P	Pedro Martínez^{[a]}	Red Sox	6
P	Freddy García	Mariners	2
P	Eddie Guardado	Twins	1
P	Mariano Rivera	Yankees	5
P	Kazuhiro Sasaki	Mariners	2
P	Ugueth Urbina^{[b]}	Red Sox	2
P	Barry Zito	Athletics	1

Reserves
Position	Player	Team	All-Star Games
C	A. J. Pierzynski	Twins	1
1B	Paul Konerko	White Sox	1
1B	Mike Sweeney	Royals	3
3B	Tony Batista	Orioles	2
3B	Robin Ventura	Yankees	2
SS	Nomar Garciaparra	Red Sox	4
SS	Derek Jeter	Yankees	5
SS	Miguel Tejada	Athletics	1
SS	Omar Vizquel	Indians	3
OF	Garret Anderson	Angels	1
OF	Johnny Damon^{[FV]}	Red Sox	1
OF	Robert Fick	Tigers	1
OF	Randy Winn	Devil Rays	1

Manager
Manager	Team
Joe Torre	Yankees

Coaches
Coach	Team
Mike Scioscia	Angels
Charlie Manuel	Indians

=== National League ===
Starters
Position	Player	Team	All-Star Games
P	Curt Schilling	Diamondbacks	5
C	Mike Piazza	Mets	10
1B	Todd Helton	Rockies	3
2B	José Vidro	Expos	2
3B	Scott Rolen	Phillies	1
SS	Jimmy Rollins	Phillies	2
OF	Barry Bonds	Giants	11
OF	Vladimir Guerrero	Expos	4
OF	Sammy Sosa	Cubs	6

Pitchers
Position	Player	Team	All-Star Games
P	Éric Gagné	Dodgers	1
P	Tom Glavine^{[a]}	Braves	8
P	Trevor Hoffman	Padres	4
P	Byung-hyun Kim	Diamondbacks	1
P	Randy Johnson^{[a]}	Diamondbacks	9
P	Matt Morris^{[a]}	Cardinals	2
P	Robb Nen^{[b]}	Giants	3
P	Vicente Padilla^{[b]}	Phillies	1
P	Odalis Pérez	Dodgers	1
P	Mike Remlinger^{[b]}	Braves	1
P	John Smoltz	Braves	5
P	Mike Williams	Pirates	1

Reserves
Position	Player	Team	All-Star Games
C	Damian Miller	Diamondbacks	1
C	Benito Santiago	Giants	5
1B	Richie Sexson	Brewers	1
2B	Junior Spivey	Diamondbacks	1
2B	Luis Castillo	Marlins	1
3B	Mike Lowell	Marlins	1
SS	Jose Hernández	Brewers	1
OF	Lance Berkman	Astros	2
OF	Adam Dunn	Reds	1
OF	Luis Gonzalez	Diamondbacks	3
OF	Shawn Green	Dodgers	2
OF	Andruw Jones^{[FV]}	Braves	2

Manager
Manager	Team
Bob Brenly	Diamondbacks

Coaches
Coach	Team
Jim Tracy	Dodgers
Frank Robinson	Expos

Notes

- ^{a} Player declined or was unable to play.
- ^{b} Player replaced vacant spot on roster.
- ^{FV} Player was voted onto roster through the All-Star Final Vote.

=== Starting lineups ===
American League				National League			
Order	Player	Team	Position	Order	Player	Team	Position
1	Ichiro Suzuki	Mariners	RF	1	José Vidro	Expos	2B
2	Shea Hillenbrand	Red Sox	3B	2	Todd Helton	Rockies	1B
3	Alex Rodriguez	Rangers	SS	3	Barry Bonds	Giants	LF
4	Jason Giambi	Yankees	1B	4	Sammy Sosa	Cubs	RF
5	Manny Ramírez	Red Sox	LF	5	Vladimir Guerrero	Expos	CF
6	Jorge Posada	Yankees	C	6	Mike Piazza	Mets	C
7	Torii Hunter	Twins	CF	7	Scott Rolen	Phillies	3B
8	Alfonso Soriano	Yankees	2B	8	Jimmy Rollins	Phillies	SS
9	Derek Lowe	Red Sox	P	9	Curt Schilling	Diamondbacks	P

== Game ==
=== Umpires ===
Home Plate	Gerry Davis
First Base	Tim Tschida
Second Base	Chuck Meriwether
Third Base	Jerry Meals
Left Field	Marty Foster
Right Field	Paul Emmel

=== Game summary ===
Tuesday, July 9, 2002 7:05 pm (CDT) at Miller Park in Milwaukee, Wisconsin
Team	1	2	3	4	5	6	7	8	9	10	11	R	H	E
American League	0	0	0	1	1	0	4	1	0	0	0	7	12	0
National League	0	1	3	0	1	0	2	0	0	0	0	7	13	0
Starting pitchers: AL: Derek Lowe; NL: Curt Schilling; Home runs: AL: Alfonso Soriano (1); NL: Barry Bonds (1)

National League starting pitcher Curt Schilling was sharp early on, striking out three through two innings pitched. In the bottom of the first, Barry Bonds hit a deep fly ball off AL starter Derek Lowe, which looked to be deep enough to be a home run. Instead, center fielder Torii Hunter reached over the wall and caught Bonds' drive, denying the NL an early lead. Bonds playfully picked up Hunter as the NL took the field the next inning.

The NL got on the board in the bottom of the second inning, when a Mike Piazza groundout scored Vladimir Guerrero from third base. The NL scored three more runs in the next inning, when Todd Helton singled home Jimmy Rollins. Barry Bonds got revenge for having his first-inning home run taken away, belting a two-run hit to give the NL a 4–0 lead. The AL finally scored in the fourth, on the strength of a Manny Ramírez RBI single.

The AL cut the NL lead in half in the fifth, when Alfonso Soriano hit a homer off Éric Gagné to cut the lead to 4–2. The NL got a run back with Damian Miller's RBI double to put the NL up 5–2. The AL put together a high-scoring inning in the seventh to take the lead. An RBI groundout from Garret Anderson, an RBI single from Tony Batista, and a two-run double from Paul Konerko scored four runs for the AL, giving them a 6–5 lead after their half of the seventh.

The NL regained the lead in the bottom of the seventh, with a two-run single from Lance Berkman, allowing Mike Lowell and Damian Miller to score. The AL quickly tied the score in the eighth, with Omar Vizquel's RBI triple. Neither team scored in the ninth and the game went into extra innings. Vicente Padilla and Freddy García each pitched scoreless tenth innings, keeping the game tied.

A serious problem arose at this point, as Padilla and Garcia were the last available pitchers on each team. After a scoreless top of the 11th inning, AL and NL managers Joe Torre and Bob Brenly met by the first base dugout with Commissioner Bud Selig to discuss the situation.

Selig controversially ruled that if the NL did not score in the bottom of the 11th, the game would be declared a tie. After the decision was announced over the stadium's public address system, fans loudly booed and jeered, with beer bottles being thrown onto the field, and chants of "Let them play!", "Refund!", "Bud must go!" and "Ripoff!" were heard. Garcia retired the NL side in the 11th, and the game ended in a 7–7 tie, to further booing and bottle throwing. No MVP award was given.

== Home Run Derby ==
The Home Run Derby took place on July 8 with eight players, four from each league, competing to try to hit as many home runs as possible.

Miller Park, Milwaukee—A.L. 42, N.L. 31
Player	Team	Round 1	Semis	Finals	Totals
Jason Giambi	Yankees	11	7	7	25
Sammy Sosa	Cubs	12	5	1	18
Paul Konerko	White Sox	6	6	–	12
Richie Sexson	Brewers	6	4	–	10
Torii Hunter	Twins	3	–	–	3
Barry Bonds	Giants	2	–	–	2
Alex Rodriguez	Rangers	2	–	–	2
Lance Berkman	Astros	1	–	–	1

Semifinals
1	Sammy Sosa	5
4	Richie Sexson	4
2	Jason Giambi	7
3	Paul Konerko	6

Finals
1	Sammy Sosa	1
2	Jason Giambi	7

- Giambi defeated Konerko in a blast off, similar to penalty shots

== Notes ==
- Before the game, Red Sox All-Stars Nomar Garciaparra, Johnny Damon and Ugueth Urbina unveiled a No. 9 (in honor of Ted Williams, who died a few days earlier) painted into the grass in left field—the position the "Splendid Splinter" patrolled in 19 All-Star Games while playing for Boston. It was also the introduction of the uniform change for the Red Sox, adding a black "9" and black armband on the right sleeve of the jersey, for the remainder of the 2002 season.
- Davey Lopes was not selected as an NL coach, due to him being fired by the Brewers in mid April.
- In the bottom of the first inning, Torii Hunter made a leaping catch of what would have been a home run by Barry Bonds. Initially lauded as a great play, the catch took on extra significance when the game ended in a tie and the play was voted the play of the year on MLB.com. Bonds hit one out later in the game to make sure that Torii couldn't rob him again.
- In Bernie's Dugout above left field, mascots from multiple MLB teams joined Bernie and pushed each other down the slide every time a home run was made.
- When Freddy García batted in the 11th inning, he wore a Chicago White Sox helmet; coincidentally, he was traded to the White Sox two years later.
- With the American League having five shortstops and one second baseman, Omar Vizquel came off the bench to play second base.
- After the first out was recorded in the bottom of the 11th, public address announcer Robb Edwards announced the decision that if the National League did not score, the game would end in a tie. They did not, and it did. When the game was called, the fans started the Bad News Bears chant of "Let them Play!, Let them Play!" to no avail.
- Joe Buck and Tim McCarver stated that if the American League had won, Paul Konerko would have been named MVP, and if the National League had won, Damian Miller would have been named MVP.
- Throughout the game, both managers wore microphones to converse with Buck, McCarver, and each other.
