= 2006 Division Series =

2006 Division Series may refer to:

- 2006 American League Division Series
- 2006 National League Division Series
