= Eric Cooper =

American baseball umpire (1966-2019)

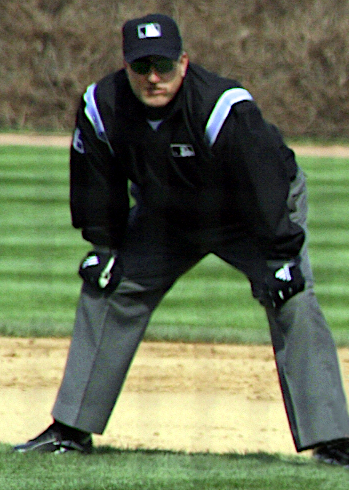
- Cooper in 2007
- Umpire
- Born: December 18, 1966; Des Moines, Iowa, US
- Died: October 20, 2019 (aged 52); Urbandale, Iowa, US

MLB debut
- June 17, 1996

Last MLB appearance
- October 7, 2019

Career highlights and awards
- Special assignments: World Series (2014); League Championship Series (2004, 2015, 2016, 2017); Division Series (2003, 2005, 2006, 2008, 2009, 2011, 2012, 2013, 2014, 2019); Wild Card Games (2015, 2016, 2017); All-Star Games (2005); World Baseball Classic (2009, 2013, 2017); MLB in Omaha (2019); Home plate umpire for Hideo Nomo's second no-hitter (April 4, 2001); Home plate umpire for Mark Buehrle's no-hitter (April 18, 2007); Home plate umpire for Buehrle's perfect game (July 23, 2009)

Eric Richard Cooper (December 18, 1966 – October 20, 2019) was an American professional baseball umpire, whose Major League Baseball (MLB) career spanned 1999 until his death in October 2019. He wore umpire uniform number 56. As a Major League umpire, Cooper officiated in ten Division Series, four League Championship Series, three Wild Card Games, one All-Star Game, and one World Series.

== Early career ==
Cooper graduated from Iowa State University with a degree in transportation logistics. He then attended the Joe Brinkman Umpire School, and spent several years as a Minor League Baseball (MiLB) umpire, working in the Appalachian League (1990), Midwest League (1991), Florida State League (1992), Eastern League (1993–94), American Association (1995–97) and Pacific Coast League (1998).

== MLB career ==
Cooper became a permanent Major League Baseball umpire beginning in 1999. He worked the Division Series (2003, 2005, 2006, 2008, 2009, 2011, 2012, 2013, 2014, 2019), the League Championship Series (2004, 2015, 2016, 2017), the Major League Baseball Wild Card Game (2015 and 2016, 2017), the 2014 World Series, and the 2005 All-Star Game. Cooper also worked the World Baseball Classic in 2009 and 2013.

Cooper was the home plate umpire for Hideo Nomo's no-hitter in 2001, and for Mark Buehrle's no-hitter against the Texas Rangers on April 18, 2007. Cooper was also behind the plate for Buehrle's subsequent perfect game, thrown in 2009. Cooper joined Ed Vargo as umpires who had called balls and strikes for two no-hitters by the same pitcher. At the time of Cooper’s death, he was one of only eight active major league umpires who have worked behind the plate for multiple no-hitters (the others being Jeff Kellogg, Ed Hickox, Ted Barrett, Adrian Johnson, Ron Kulpa, Brian Knight, and Greg Gibson).

Cooper was the plate umpire for the game on September 11, 2008, in which Francisco Rodriguez tied the major league single-season save record. Cooper was struck by a foul ball during the game, but was able to continue after a brief pause. Cooper was also the third base umpire in the last game played at the old Yankee Stadium in 2008.

Cooper worked his final game on October 7, 2019, in the 2019 American League Division Series.

== Personal life ==
Cooper was born in Des Moines, Iowa. He was married to Tara Cooper and had two children.

== Death ==
On October 20, 2019, Cooper's death was announced by Major League Baseball; he died after developing a blood clot following knee surgery the week prior. On October 22, prior to Game 1 of the World Series, there was a moment of silence in memory of Cooper.

== See also ==
- List of Major League Baseball umpires (disambiguation)
