= Ron Kulpa =

American baseball umpire (born 1968)

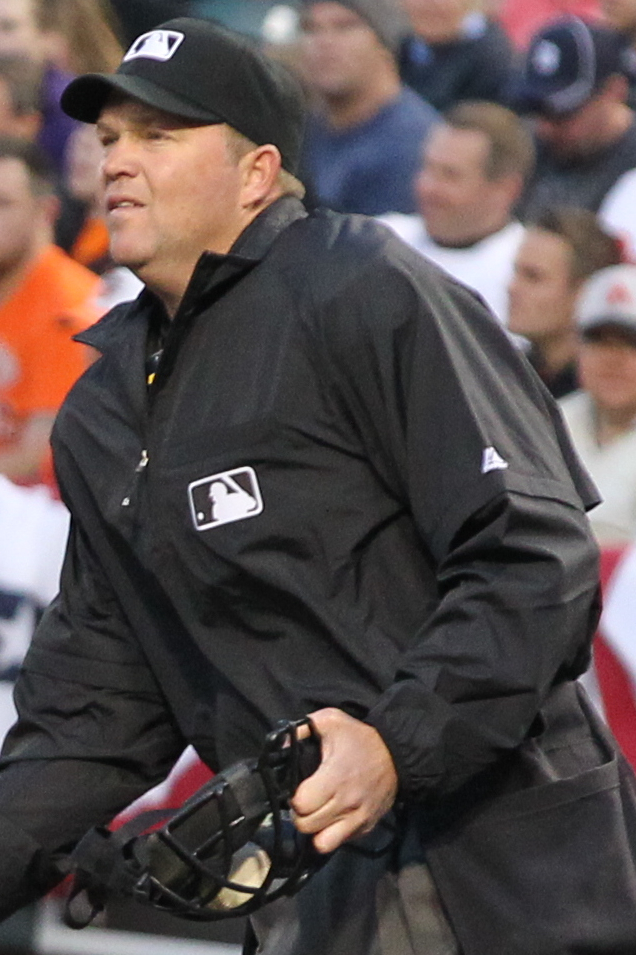
- Kulpa in 2011

MLB – No. 46
- Umpire
- Born: October 5, 1968 (age 58); St. Louis, Missouri, U.S.

MLB debut
- July 23, 1998

Crew information
- Umpiring crew: C
- Crew members: #46 Ron Kulpa (crew chief); #87 Scott Barry; #79 Manny Gonzalez; #69 Tom Hanahan

Career highlights and awards
- Special assignments: World Series (2011, 2021); League Championship Series (2005, 2013, 2014); Division Series (2001, 2002, 2006, 2007, 2008, 2009, 2011, 2017, 2020, 2021); Wild Card Games/Series (2020); All-Star Games (2001, 2015); World Baseball Classic (2009, 2023)

Ronald Clarence Kulpa (born October 5, 1968) is an American umpire in Major League Baseball. He wears uniform number 46.

== Umpiring career ==
Kulpa's professional umpiring career began in 1992 and he advanced to the Pacific Coast League in 1998. Kulpa was one of the 22 umpires promoted in the wake of the Major League Umpires Association's mass-resignation strategy in July 1999, and was named to the National League staff for the remainder of the 1999 season. When the umpiring staffs from the two leagues merged for the 2000 season, Kulpa began working in both leagues.

He has worked several MLB Special Events, including the All-Star Game (2001, 2015), Wild Card (2020), Division Series (2001, 2002, 2006, 2007, 2008, 2009, 2011, 2017, 2020, 2021), League Championship Series (2005, 2013, 2014), and World Series (2011, 2021). He also officiated in the 2009 World Baseball Classic. Kulpa was named a Crew Chief for the 2022 MLB season.

=== Controversies ===
Kulpa was head-butted by Carl Everett of the Boston Red Sox in 2000 during an argument about the location of the inner boundary of the batter's box. Everett was suspended for 10 games and fined.

On August 12, 2013, he ejected Rangers catcher A. J. Pierzynski for arguing a ball three call during pitcher Yu Darvish's bid for a perfect game against the Houston Astros. The perfect game was broken up moments later on an ensuing ball four pitch to Astros batter Jonathan Villar.

During the second inning of an Astros-Rangers game on April 4, 2019, after a low pitch from Mike Minor outside the strikezone to Tyler White was called a strike, the Astros dugout expressed displeasure at the call, to which Kulpa responded back. After a short conversation with Astros manager A. J. Hinch, Kulpa proceeded to stare into the Astros dugout while Minor was on the mound ready to pitch. After Hinch told Kulpa to "look over there", Kulpa proceeded to eject Astros hitting coach Alex Cintrón. On the following pitch, after no further provocation by the Astros dugout, Kulpa again stared at the Astros dugout, leading to Hinch telling Kulpa "You can't keep doing it". Kulpa responded with "I can do anything I want", before ejecting Hinch from the game. Kulpa would later interrupt Astros pitcher Gerrit Cole's warm-up pitches before the fourth inning after having instigated an argument with Cole and Astros catcher Max Stassi, after Cole began walking to the dugout after a potential third strike that was instead called a ball by Kulpa.

On April 8, 2021, Kulpa made a controversial call as the home-plate umpire of a game between the New York Mets and the Miami Marlins. The game was tied at 2-2 in the bottom of the ninth inning, and the bases were loaded for the Mets. Michael Conforto of the Mets went up to the plate. The controversy ensued after a pitch thrown by closer Anthony Bass hit Conforto. Kulpa, however, ruled it to be a hit by pitch, even though the pitch was a strike, and Conforto seemed to lean into the pitch. The Mets walked off and won the game. Kulpa later talked to reporters and admitted that he made the wrong call. Both managers also commented on the call. Don Mattingly, manager of the Marlins, remarked: "Kulpa knows it was a strike. He couldn't go backwards in his mind. Honestly, he's probably feeling bad. To be honest with you, I bet he feels awful." However, Luis Rojas, manager of the Mets, commented that Conforto did not intentionally lean in, claiming: "I looked at the replay ... I don't think he leans, but that's kind of how he moves his hands. Even throwing to him in batting practice, he does that on pitches in."

=== Notable games ===
Kulpa was the home plate umpire when Detroit Tigers pitcher Justin Verlander threw a no-hitter at Comerica Park vs. the Milwaukee Brewers on June 12, 2007. Five days before Verlander's no-hitter, Kulpa called balls and strikes in a game between the Red Sox and the Oakland Athletics in which Boston pitcher Curt Schilling had a no-hitter until Shannon Stewart broke up the no-hitter with a single with two outs in the bottom of the ninth inning.

Kulpa was the first base umpire on July 9, 2011, when Derek Jeter of the New York Yankees got his 3000th career hit against the Tampa Bay Rays. He was the plate umpire for Henderson Álvarez's no-hitter on September 29, 2013.

On September 13, 2020, Kulpa was the first base umpire for a no-hitter thrown by Alec Mills of the Chicago Cubs against the Milwaukee Brewers.

== Injuries ==
On April 15, 2019, Kulpa was removed from a game between the St. Louis Cardinals and Milwaukee Brewers in Milwaukee after being struck by a 94-mph fastball by Junior Guerra off his mask. He was replaced behind home plate by Jerry Meals.

On May 22, 2021, Kulpa was struck by a 93.4-mph sinker by Cincinnati Reds pitcher Sonny Gray off his mask and left the game between the Brewers and Reds in Cincinnati. He was replaced behind home plate by Nic Lentz.

On Mother's Day, 2022, Kulpa exited a game between the Chicago White Sox and Boston Red Sox in Boston after a 95.8-mph fastball by Hirokazu Sawamura was fouled off by Jake Burger right into his mask. He was replaced behind home plate by Marty Foster.

On September 12, 2022, Kulpa exited a game between the Los Angeles Angels and Cleveland Guardians in Cleveland after taking a foul ball to the mask with 2 outs in the top of the 9th inning. He was replaced behind home plate by Carlos Torres.

On April 4, 2026, Kulpa left a game between the Miami Marlins and New York Yankees at Yankee Stadium after taking a foul ball off his mask. He was replaced behind home plate by Scott Barry.

== See also ==
- List of Major League Baseball umpires (disambiguation)
