= Tim Tschida =

American baseball umpire (born 1960)

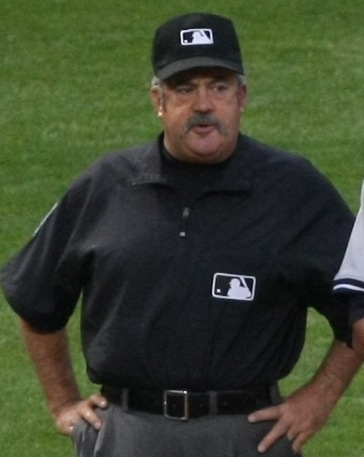
- Tschida in 2009
- Born: May 4, 1960 (age 65); Saint Paul, Minnesota, U.S.
- Occupation: Major League Baseball umpire
- Years active: 1985–2012
- Spouse: Barbara Herzan (m. 1992)
- Children: 2

Timothy Joseph Tschida (/ˈtʃiːdə/ CHEE-də; born May 4, 1960) is an American former umpire in Major League Baseball. He joined the American League's full-time staff in 1986, and worked in both major leagues from 2000 until his retirement following the 2012 season.

== Umpiring career ==
His professional umpiring career began after he attended the Joe Brinkman Umpire School in 1981. He was elevated to the AL for the 1986 season. In 2000, the American and National Leagues combined umpiring staffs. He wore uniform number 4 beginning in the late 1980s.

For the 2007 season, Tschida was promoted to a crew chief position, and his crew included Jim Joyce, Jeff Nelson and Jim Wolf. His crew in 2011 included Jeff Nelson, Marty Foster and Bill Welke. Tschida's 2012 crew consisted of Jeff Nelson, Bill Welke, and Chris Guccione.

A report by The Hardball Times asserts that Tschida called the smallest strike zone of all MLB umpires in 2011.

=== Achievements ===
He worked in thirteen postseasons, including the World Series in 1998, 2002 and 2008; the League Championship Series in 1993, 1999, and 2000; and the Division Series in 1996, 1997, 1998, 2001, 2002, 2006, 2007, 2008, and 2009. He worked the All-Star Game in 1992 and 2002. He was the second base umpire for the single-game playoff to decide the NL's 2007 wild card team. He was also the third base umpire for Kenny Rogers's perfect game on July 28, 1994, and the home plate umpire for Nolan Ryan's seventh no-hitter on May 1, 1991 and Carlos Zambrano's no-hitter on September 14, 2008. Home plate umpire for Tom Kramer's one hitter on May 24, 1993, in Cleveland's Municipal stadium.

=== Controversies ===
On August 3, 1987, Tschida was the plate umpire when he ejected Minnesota Twins pitcher Joe Niekro for possessing an emery board.

On August 4, 1999, Anaheim Angels hitter Orlando Palmeiro struck out to lead off a game and then dropped his bat at home plate, prompting Tschida, the home-plate umpire, to eject him. However, manager Terry Collins convinced Tschida to allow Palmeiro back into the game, as Palmeiro had merely been leaving the bat at home plate because every hitter was using the same bat.

Tschida made a widely disputed call in the 1999 ALCS in which Chuck Knoblauch applied a "phantom tag" to José Offerman. The call was ranked the worst call in sports history by readers of ESPN Playbook.

On June 19, 2012, Tampa Bay Rays pitcher Joel Peralta was ejected by Tschida for having pine tar inside his glove.

== Personal life ==
Tschida attended Cretin High School and the University of St. Thomas. Tschida is involved in charity work, including Meals on Wheels and other Catholic charities. Tschida became a member of the Catholic Athletic Association's Hall of Fame in 2007.

== See also ==
- List of Major League Baseball umpires (disambiguation)
