= 2008 American League Division Series =

Teams
Team (Wins)		Manager	Season
Boston Red Sox (3)		Terry Francona	95–67 (.586), GB: 2
Los Angeles Angels of Anaheim (1)		Mike Scioscia	100–62 (.617), GA: 21
- Dates: October 1–6
- Television: TBS
- TV announcers: Chip Caray, Buck Martinez, Ron Darling (Game 4), and Craig Sager
- Radio: ESPN
- Radio announcers: Dan Shulman and Dave Campbell
- Umpires: Tim Welke, Bill Miller, Kerwin Danley, Ed Rapuano, Tim Tschida, Marty Foster

Teams
Team (Wins)		Manager	Season
Tampa Bay Rays (3)		Joe Maddon	97–65 (.599), GA: 2
Chicago White Sox (1)		Ozzie Guillén	89–74 (.546), GA: 1
- Dates: October 2–6
- Television: TBS
- TV announcers: Don Orsillo, Harold Reynolds, and Marc Fein
- Radio: ESPN
- Radio announcers: Gary Thorne and Chris Singleton
- Umpires: Joe West, C. B. Bucknor, Ron Kulpa, Jeff Kellogg, Gary Darling, Eric Cooper

The 2008 American League Division Series (ALDS), consisted of two best-of-five playoff series on the American League side in Major League Baseball’s (MLB) 2008 postseason to determine the two participants in the 2008 American League Championship Series. The ALDS began on Wednesday, October 1, and ended on Monday, October 6, with the champions of the three AL divisions and one wild card team played in the two series. TBS televised all the games in the United States.

Under MLB's playoff format, no two teams from the same division were matched up in the Division Series, regardless of whether their records would normally indicate such a matchup. Home field advantage went to the team with the better regular-season record with the exception of the wild card team, which defers home field advantage regardless of record. The matchups were:

- (1) Los Angeles Angels of Anaheim (AL West champions) vs. (4) Boston Red Sox (Wild Card qualifier): Red Sox won the series, 3–1.
- (2) Tampa Bay Rays (AL East champions) vs. (3) Chicago White Sox (AL Central champions): Rays won the series, 3–1.

Since the Twins and the White Sox completed the regular season with identical records (88–74), the two teams played against each other in a one-game playoff. The White Sox defeated the Twins, 1–0, and thus became the AL Central champions.

The Rays defeated the Red Sox in the ALCS, and went on to lose the 2008 World Series to the National League champion Philadelphia Phillies.

== Matchups ==
=== Los Angeles Angels of Anaheim vs. Boston Red Sox ===
Boston won the series, 3–1.

Game	Date	Score	Location	Time	Attendance
1	October 1	Boston Red Sox – 4, Los Angeles Angels of Anaheim – 1	Angel Stadium of Anaheim	3:14	44,996
2	October 3	Boston Red Sox – 7, Los Angeles Angels of Anaheim – 5	Angel Stadium of Anaheim	3:51	45,354
3	October 5	Los Angeles Angels of Anaheim – 5, Boston Red Sox – 4 (12)	Fenway Park	5:19	39,067
4	October 6	Los Angeles Angels of Anaheim – 2, Boston Red Sox – 3	Fenway Park	2:50	38,785

=== Tampa Bay Rays vs. Chicago White Sox ===
Tampa Bay won the series, 3–1.

Game	Date	Score	Location	Time	Attendance
1	October 2	Chicago White Sox – 4, Tampa Bay Rays – 6	Tropicana Field	3:10	35,041
2	October 3	Chicago White Sox – 2, Tampa Bay Rays – 6	Tropicana Field	3:10	35,257
3	October 5	Tampa Bay Rays – 3, Chicago White Sox – 5	U.S. Cellular Field	3:07	40,142
4	October 6	Tampa Bay Rays – 6, Chicago White Sox – 2	U.S. Cellular Field	3:13	40,454

== Los Angeles vs. Boston ==
=== Game 1 ===
October 1, 2008 7:07 pm (PDT) at Angel Stadium of Anaheim in Anaheim, California 83 °F (28 °C), clear
Team	1	2	3	4	5	6	7	8	9	R	H	E
Boston	0	0	0	0	0	2	0	0	2	4	8	1
Los Angeles	0	0	1	0	0	0	0	0	0	1	9	1
WP: Jon Lester (1–0) LP: John Lackey (0–1) Sv: Jonathan Papelbon (1); Home runs: BOS: Jason Bay (1); LAA: None; Attendance: 44,996; Boxscore

In a re-match of last year's ALDS, starters Jon Lester and John Lackey were sharp early on, each tossing a couple of scoreless innings. The Angels finally got on the board in the third, when Torii Hunter singled home Garret Anderson to put the Angels up 1–0. Lackey held the Red Sox scoreless until the sixth, when newly acquired left fielder Jason Bay hit a two-run homer to put the Sox up 2–1. It would stay 2–1 until the ninth. The Sox got a couple of insurance runs, with Jacoby Ellsbury and David Ortiz each singling home a run. Jonathan Papelbon struck out the side in the bottom of the ninth for his fifth career postseason save. This marked the Angels' 10th consecutive playoff game loss to the Red Sox (dating back to Game 5 of the 1986 American League Championship Series), as well as their eighth consecutive playoff game loss overall (dating back to Game 2 of the 2005 ALCS).

=== Game 2 ===
October 3, 2008 6:37 pm (PDT) at Angel Stadium of Anaheim in Anaheim, California 65 °F (18 °C), partly cloudy
Team	1	2	3	4	5	6	7	8	9	R	H	E
Boston	4	0	0	1	0	0	0	0	2	7	14	0
Los Angeles	1	0	0	1	1	0	1	1	0	5	11	2
WP: Jonathan Papelbon (1–0) LP: Francisco Rodríguez (0–1); Home runs: BOS: Jason Bay (2), J. D. Drew (1); LAA: None; Attendance: 45,354; Boxscore

The Red Sox jumped out to an early lead in the first thanks to a three-run homer by Jason Bay. The Angels scored one run in the first off an effective but inefficient Daisuke Matsuzaka and continued to chip away at Boston's lead throughout the game. In total, the Angels recorded 11 hits with 10 of them being singles. In the eighth inning Mark Teixeira tied the game with a sacrifice fly off Jonathan Papelbon who had to enter the game prematurely due to Justin Masterson giving up a leadoff triple. The game entered the ninth inning tied at five but that deadlock was broken after a double by David Ortiz and a two-run home run to center by J. D. Drew off Angels closer Francisco Rodríguez. Rodríguez was charged with the loss and although Papelbon had a blown save he also recorded the win. Boston, leading the series two games to none, headed back to Fenway Park. With their eleventh consecutive playoff win over the Angels, the Red Sox broke the record for consecutive playoff wins over another team, which had been set against them by the Oakland Athletics who beat the Red Sox in 10 consecutive playoff games from 1988 to 2003.

=== Game 3 ===
October 5, 2008 7:29 pm (EDT) at Fenway Park in Boston, Massachusetts 53 °F (12 °C), mostly clear
Team	1	2	3	4	5	6	7	8	9	10	11	12	R	H	E
Los Angeles	1	0	2	0	1	0	0	0	0	0	0	1	5	16	0
Boston	0	3	0	0	1	0	0	0	0	0	0	0	4	7	0
WP: Jered Weaver (1–0) LP: Javier López (0–1); Home runs: LAA: Mike Napoli 2 (2); BOS: None; Attendance: 39,067; Boxscore

The Angels got to an early lead when Juan Rivera drew a bases loaded walk to score Chone Figgins from third. A fielding miscue by the Angels in the second inning caused a fly ball hit by Jacoby Ellsbury to drop between Torii Hunter and Howie Kendrick in shallow center field, scoring three runs (Jed Lowrie, Jason Varitek, and Coco Crisp) and giving the Red Sox a two-run lead. The next inning, Mike Napoli tied the score with a two-run home run over the Green Monster that completely left the ballpark. In the fifth inning, Napoli hit another home run over the Monster, giving the Angels a one-run lead. Ellsbury and Kevin Youkilis hit back-to-back doubles in the bottom half of the inning to tie the score at four apiece. The score remained deadlocked until the top of the 12th inning, when Napoli scored from second on an Erick Aybar single. The Angels' win ended an 11-game postseason losing streak against the Red Sox that dated back to 1986, and a nine-game overall postseason skid that dated back to 2005.

=== Game 4 ===
October 6, 2008 8:39 pm (EDT) at Fenway Park in Boston, Massachusetts 49 °F (9 °C), cloudy
Team	1	2	3	4	5	6	7	8	9	R	H	E
Los Angeles	0	0	0	0	0	0	0	2	0	2	6	1
Boston	0	0	0	0	2	0	0	0	1	3	9	0
WP: Manny Delcarmen (1–0) LP: Scot Shields (0–1); Attendance: 38,785; Boxscore

The game remained scoreless for the first four and a half innings thanks to sharp pitching from both John Lackey and Jon Lester. In the bottom of the fifth inning, Boston got its first run when Jacoby Ellsbury grounded out to second base, scoring Mark Kotsay from third base. Howie Kendrick bobbled the ball and was unable to try for a double play, which would have ended the inning. Dustin Pedroia then hit a double off the left field wall to score Jason Varitek from second. In the eighth inning, a passed ball allowed Mark Teixeira and Vladimir Guerrero to advance on second and third, and they subsequently scored on a single by Torii Hunter to tie the game. In the top of the ninth inning, the Angels threatened with a leadoff double by pinch hitter Kendry Morales followed by a sacrifice bunt, but when Erick Aybar failed to make contact on a suicide squeeze attempt, the runner was tagged out. In the bottom of the ninth inning, Jed Lowrie won the game with a walk-off single, scoring Jason Bay from second base.

Curiously, the last team to win their division by at least 20 games, the 1999 Cleveland Indians, also lost to Boston in the ALDS.

=== Composite box ===
2008 ALDS (3–1): Boston Red Sox over Los Angeles Angels of Anaheim

Team	1	2	3	4	5	6	7	8	9	10	11	12	R	H	E
Boston Red Sox	4	3	0	1	3	2	0	0	5	0	0	0	18	38	1
Los Angeles Angels of Anaheim	2	0	3	1	2	0	1	3	0	0	0	1	13	42	4
Total attendance: 168,202 Average attendance: 42,051

== Tampa Bay vs. Chicago ==
=== Game 1 ===
October 2, 2008 2:38 pm (EDT) at Tropicana Field in St. Petersburg, Florida 73 °F (23 °C), dome
Team	1	2	3	4	5	6	7	8	9	R	H	E
Chicago	0	0	3	0	0	0	0	0	1	4	7	0
Tampa Bay	0	1	3	0	2	0	0	0	X	6	11	0
WP: James Shields (1–0) LP: Javier Vázquez (0–1) Sv: Dan Wheeler (1); Home runs: CWS: DeWayne Wise (1), Paul Konerko (1); TB: Evan Longoria 2 (2); Attendance: 35,041; Boxscore

The Rays went up 1–0 in the second on rookie Evan Longoria's leadoff home run in his first postseason at-bat off Javier Vazquez, but starter James Shields allowed consecutive leadoff singles in the third before DeWayne Wise's two-out three-run home run put the White Sox up 3−1. In the bottom of the inning, however, Jason Bartlett hit a leadoff single and scored on Akinori Iwamura's triple. After B. J. Upton struck out, Willy Aybar's sacrifice fly tied the game before Longoria's home run put Tampa up 4–3. The Rays added to their lead on Longoria's one-out single with two on off Vazquez, who was then relieved by Clayton Richard and allowed an RBI single to Carl Crawford. Paul Konerko's leadoff home run in the ninth off Dan Wheeler made it 6–4 Tampa, but Wheeler retired the next three batters to end the game and give the Rays a 1–0 series lead as they won their first postseason game in franchise history. Longoria became only the second ever player to homer in his first two career post-season at-bats, the other being Gary Gaetti in 1987.

=== Game 2 ===
October 3, 2008 6:07 pm (EDT) at Tropicana Field in St. Petersburg, Florida 73 °F (23 °C), dome
Team	1	2	3	4	5	6	7	8	9	R	H	E
Chicago	2	0	0	0	0	0	0	0	0	2	12	1
Tampa Bay	0	1	0	0	2	0	0	3	X	6	12	0
WP: Scott Kazmir (1–0) LP: Mark Buehrle (0–1); Home runs: CWS: None; TB: Akinori Iwamura (1); Attendance: 35,257; Boxscore

In Game 2, the White Sox loaded the bases off Scott Kazmir in the first on a walk, hit-by-pitch, and single when Jim Thome's one-out single followed by Alexei Ramírez's sacrifice fly scored a run each. However, Kazmir and the Rays' bullpen would shut them out for the rest of the game. The White Sox left 12 runners on base and were 3 for 12 with them in scoring position. In the second, Willy Aybar hit a leadoff single off Mark Buehrle, moved to third on Ramirez's throwing error to first on Rocco Baldelli's line out and scored on Dioner Navarro's single. In the fifth, Jason Bartlett singled with one out, then Akinori Iwamura's home run put the Rays up 3−2. They added insurance in the eighth when B. J. Upton hit a leadoff triple and scored on Carl Crawford's single to knock Buehrle out of the game. Crawford stole second, moved to third on a groundout, and scored on Baldelli's single off Octavio Dotel. Baldelli then scored on Navarro's double off Matt Thornton to put the Rays up 6−2. Chad Bradford pitched a scoreless ninth as the Rays took a 2−0 series lead heading to Chicago.

=== Game 3 ===
October 5, 2008 3:42 pm (CDT) at U.S. Cellular Field in Chicago, Illinois 58 °F (14 °C), mostly cloudy
Team	1	2	3	4	5	6	7	8	9	R	H	E
Tampa Bay	0	1	0	0	0	0	2	0	0	3	8	0
Chicago	0	0	1	3	0	1	0	0	X	5	7	0
WP: John Danks (1–0) LP: Matt Garza (0–1) Sv: Bobby Jenks (1); Home runs: TB: B. J. Upton (1); CWS: None; Attendance: 40,142; Boxscore

The Rays got on the board first when Akinori Iwamura singled with two outs in the second inning to score Dioner Navarro. Chicago evened the score in the bottom of the third inning when DeWayne Wise scored on a single by A. J. Pierzynski after stealing second base. Chicago took the lead in the bottom of the fourth when Alexei Ramírez hit a sacrifice fly with the bases loaded and one out. Then DeWayne Wise doubled to score Paul Konerko and Ken Griffey Jr. In the sixth inning, the White Sox added an insurance run when Juan Uribe drove in Brian Anderson with two outs. The Rays finally chased starter John Danks after a two-run homer by B. J. Upton and a single by Carlos Peña. Neither bullpen allowed any runs; Bobby Jenks recorded the save.

=== Game 4 ===
October 6, 2008 4:07 pm (CDT) at U.S. Cellular Field in Chicago, Illinois 68 °F (20 °C), mostly cloudy
Team	1	2	3	4	5	6	7	8	9	R	H	E
Tampa Bay	1	0	1	2	1	0	1	0	0	6	10	0
Chicago	0	0	0	1	0	1	0	0	0	2	4	0
WP: Andy Sonnanstine (1–0) LP: Gavin Floyd (0–1); Home runs: TB: B. J. Upton 2 (3); CWS: Paul Konerko (2), Jermaine Dye (1); Attendance: 40,454; Boxscore

The Rays established an early lead after home runs by B. J. Upton in the first and third innings, and never gave up the lead. The Rays added two more runs in the fourth on consecutive hits by Cliff Floyd and Dioner Navarro, and added two more runs on RBI singles by Carlos Peña in the fifth and seventh innings. The White Sox scored on home runs by Paul Konerko (fourth inning) and Jermaine Dye (sixth inning), both off Rays starter Andy Sonnanstine who allowed three hits in 5 2/3 innings.

=== Composite box ===
2008 ALDS (3–1): Tampa Bay Rays over Chicago White Sox

Team	1	2	3	4	5	6	7	8	9	R	H	E
Tampa Bay Rays	1	3	4	2	5	0	3	3	0	21	41	0
Chicago White Sox	2	0	4	4	0	2	0	0	1	13	30	1
Total attendance: 150,894 Average attendance: 37,724

== See also ==
- 2008 National League Division Series
