= 2006 National League Division Series =

American baseball games

Teams
Team (Wins)		Manager	Season
New York Mets (3)		Willie Randolph	97–65 (.599), GA: 12
Los Angeles Dodgers (0)		Grady Little	88–74 (.543), GB: 0
- Dates: October 4–7
- Television: ESPN (Game 1); Fox (Games 2–3)
- TV announcers: Gary Thorne, Joe Morgan, Steve Phillips, and David Amber (Game 1); Thom Brennaman and Steve Lyons (Game 2); Thom Brennaman, Tim McCarver, and Chris Myers (Game 3)
- Radio: ESPN
- Radio announcers: Dan Shulman and Dave Campbell
- Umpires: John Hirschbeck, Ted Barrett, Eric Cooper, Ron Kulpa, Mike Winters, Brian O'Nora

Teams
Team (Wins)		Manager	Season
St. Louis Cardinals (3)		Tony La Russa	83–78 (.516), GA: 1 1/2
San Diego Padres (1)		Bruce Bochy	88–74 (.543), GA: 0
- Dates: October 3–8
- Television: ESPN (Games 1–2); ESPN2 (Game 3); Fox (Game 4)
- TV announcers: Chris Berman, Orel Hershiser, and Duke Castiglione (Games 1–2); Jon Miller, Joe Morgan, and Erin Andrews (Game 3); Thom Brennaman, Tim McCarver, and Ken Rosenthal (Game 4)
- Radio: ESPN
- Radio announcers: Wayne Hagin and Luis Gonzalez
- Umpires: Gerry Davis, Bill Welke, Brian Gorman, Greg Gibson, Wally Bell, Marty Foster

The 2006 National League Division Series (NLDS) consisted of two best-of-five playoff series on the National League side in Major League Baseball’s (MLB) 2006 postseason, began on Tuesday, October 3, and ended on Sunday, October 8, with the champions of the three NL divisions—along with a "wild card" team—participating in two series.

Under MLB's playoff format, no two teams from the same division were matched up in the Division Series, regardless of whether their records would normally indicate such a matchup. Home field advantage went to the team with the better regular-season record with the exception of the wild card team, which defers home field advantage regardless of record. The matchups were:

- (1) New York Mets (NL East champions) vs. (4) Los Angeles Dodgers (Wild Card qualifier): Mets won the series, 3–0.
- (2) San Diego Padres (NL West champions) vs. (3) St. Louis Cardinals (NL Central champions): Cardinals won the series, 3–1.

The higher seeded team in each series hosts Games 1, 2, and 5 (if necessary), and the lower seeded team hosts Games 3 and 4 (if necessary).

The Mets and the Cardinals met in the NL Championship Series, with the Cardinals becoming the National League champion and going on to defeat the American League champion Detroit Tigers in the 2006 World Series.

== Playoff race ==
The NL playoff race was highly dramatic when as many as six teams entered the final weekend of the regular season fighting for the final three playoff spots. Two of three division champions were decided on the final day of the regular season.

The New York Mets began the season with high hopes of finally ending the Atlanta Braves' string of division titles. The Mets lived up to their high expectations and roared out of the gate, taking over first place in the division on the fourth day of the season and never looking back. They won seven of their first eight games, and had built up a double-digit lead in the standings by the end of June. The Mets clinched the division on September 18, and finished 12 games ahead of the Philadelphia Phillies. The Braves finished third, 18 games back. However, the Mets entered the postseason without injured ace Pedro Martínez, and learned the day before Game 1 of the Division Series that projected Game 1 starter Orlando Hernández would be lost for the whole round.

The St. Louis Cardinals' run to their third consecutive Central Division championship pales in comparison to their runs in the previous two seasons. As before, the Cardinals took over the lead in the division early on, overtaking the Cincinnati Reds on June 9. It appeared as if this season would follow the established pattern as the Cardinals steadily built up their lead to as much as five and a half games and a 42–26 record on June 19. The Cardinals began interleague play by being swept by both the Chicago White Sox and Detroit Tigers as part of an eight-game losing streak. Despite the slump, they did not relinquish the division lead. The Reds were able to tie the Cardinals in the standings on June 30 and July 1, but the Cardinals regained sole possession of first place the following day and held onto the lead for the rest of the season despite additional losing streaks of eight and seven games. The Cardinals' struggles largely stemmed from the numerous injuries to key players throughout the season, including Albert Pujols, Jim Edmonds, David Eckstein, Chris Carpenter, Mark Mulder, and Jason Isringhausen. The title appeared to be well in hand on September 19 with leads of seven games over the Reds and eight and half games over the Houston Astros with just 13 games left to play. The Cardinals then went on another seven-game losing streak just as the Astros won seven consecutive, shrinking the Cardinals' lead to just a game and a half. The Cardinals were able to regain their composure, winning three of their next four and clinching on the final day of the season with an Astros loss to the Atlanta Braves.

The San Diego Padres' playoff run was led by their strong pitching and saw closer Trevor Hoffman overtake Lee Smith as the all-time saves leader. This season also marked the first time in Padres history that the team went to the playoffs in consecutive years. The Padres did not clinch a playoff spot until the final weekend of the regular season and finished with an identical record to the Los Angeles Dodgers, but they were awarded the Western Division title due to the Padres winning the season series against the Dodgers 13–5.

The Los Angeles Dodgers' run to the playoffs was most notable for their streaky play in the second half of the season. The Dodgers started the second half by losing 13 out of 14 games and trailing the Padres by seven and a half games, in last place in the division, and behind eight teams in the wild card race. They immediately followed that streak by winning 17 of their next 18 to put them on top of the division by three and half games, with a better record than all eight teams they had trailed in the wild card race prior to the streak. Their inconsistent play continued as they were swept by the Padres in late August as part of a four-game losing streak, only to follow that up by winning seven consecutive, then losing their next three. The Dodgers finished the season strong by winning their final seven games, clinching a playoff berth in the final weekend over the Philadelphia Phillies and finishing tied with the Padres. The Dodgers were awarded the wild-card spot based on their 5–13 head-to-head record against San Diego, who earned the divisional championship.

== Matchups ==
=== New York Mets vs. Los Angeles Dodgers ===
New York won the series, 3–0.

Game	Date	Score	Location	Time	Attendance
1	October 4	Los Angeles Dodgers – 5, New York Mets – 6	Shea Stadium	3:05	56,979
2	October 5	Los Angeles Dodgers – 1, New York Mets – 4	Shea Stadium	2:57	57,029
3	October 7	New York Mets – 9, Los Angeles Dodgers – 5	Dodger Stadium	3:51	56,293

=== San Diego Padres vs. St. Louis Cardinals ===
St. Louis won the series, 3–1.

Game	Date	Score	Location	Time	Attendance
1	October 3	St. Louis Cardinals – 5, San Diego Padres – 1	Petco Park	2:54	43,107
2	October 5	St. Louis Cardinals – 2, San Diego Padres – 0	Petco Park	2:54	43,463
3	October 7	San Diego Padres – 3, St. Louis Cardinals – 1	Busch Stadium (III)	3:33	46,634
4	October 8	San Diego Padres – 2, St. Louis Cardinals – 6	Busch Stadium (III)	2:44	46,476

== New York vs. Los Angeles ==
This was the second postseason meeting between the New York Mets and the Los Angeles Dodgers. The first meeting was in the 1988 National League Championship Series, which Los Angeles won in seven games.

=== Game 1 ===
October 4, 2006 4:09 pm (EDT) at Shea Stadium in Queens, New York 79 °F (26 °C), cloudy
Team	1	2	3	4	5	6	7	8	9	R	H	E
Los Angeles	0	1	0	0	0	0	3	0	1	5	11	1
New York	0	0	0	2	0	2	2	0	X	6	9	1
WP: Guillermo Mota (1–0) LP: Brad Penny (0–1) Sv: Billy Wagner (1); Home runs: LAD: None; NYM: Carlos Delgado (1), Cliff Floyd (1); Attendance: 56,979; Boxscore

The game started off with Mets rookie starter John Maine on the mound as an emergency replacement for Orlando Hernández. Hernández was sidelined with a torn muscle, and ended up missing the rest of the postseason. Maine kept the Mets in the game with only one earned run in 4 1/3 innings pitched. This game was notable for having two runners getting tagged out at home plate in the second inning. With runners on first and second and nobody out, catcher Russell Martin hit a line drive to the wall in right field. Jeff Kent tried to tag up from second base in the event that right fielder Shawn Green caught the ball. Instead, the ball sailed over Green's head. Both Kent and J. D. Drew raced around the bases towards the plate. Green threw to cut-off man José Valentín, who relayed to Paul Lo Duca at the plate. Lo Duca was first able to tag out Kent. Drew, trying to score in desperation right behind Kent, was also tagged out at the plate. Lo Duca almost did not see Drew in time to slap the tag on. Martin would score on Marlon Anderson's double but Carlos Delgado and Cliff Floyd hit solo home runs in the fourth off Derek Lowe. Lo Duca and Delgado singled in the sixth before scoring on David Wright's double to make it 4–1 Mets. In the seventh, Anderson hit a leadoff single off Guillermo Mota and second baseman Valetin's error on Wilson Betemit's ground ball put runners on first and third with no outs for the Dodgers. After Julio Lugo struck out, Anderson scored on Rafael Furcal's single. After Furcal stole second, Nomar Garciaparra's two-out double tied the game,. In the bottom of the inning, reliever Brad Penny walked two with one out before Delgado's single and Wright's double scored a run each. In the ninth, closer Billy Wagner allowed a leadoff double to Betemit, who scored on Ramon Martinez's two-out double, but Garciaparra struck out to end the game as the Mets took a 1–0 series lead.

=== Game 2 ===
October 5, 2006 8:20 pm (EDT) at Shea Stadium in Queens, New York 60 °F (16 °C), cloudy
Team	1	2	3	4	5	6	7	8	9	R	H	E
Los Angeles	0	0	0	0	0	0	0	1	0	1	5	1
New York	0	0	1	0	1	2	0	0	X	4	7	0
WP: Tom Glavine (1–0) LP: Hong-Chih Kuo (0–1) Sv: Billy Wagner (2); Home runs: LAD: Wilson Betemit (1); NYM: None; Attendance: 57,029; Boxscore

Game 2 pitted Dodgers rookie Hong-Chih Kuo against Tom Glavine. In the bottom of the third, outfielder Endy Chávez hit a bunt single to lead off the inning. A wild pitch and subsequent ground out moved him to third before he scored on José Reyes's ground out. In the fifth, the Mets loaded the bases on a hit and two walks with one out off Kuo, who was then relieved by Brett Tomko. Paul Lo Duca's sacrifice fly gave the Mets a 2–0 lead. In the sixth, the Mets loaded the bases again on two hits and an error with no outs. Mark Hendrickson relieved Tomko and got Endy Chavez to hit into a force out at home. Pinch-hitter Julio Franco's fielder's choice and Reyes's RBI single scored a run each. Wilson Betemit hit a home run in the eighth off Aaron Heilman for the Dodgers but Wagner pitched a perfect ninth for his second save of the series. The Dodgers were hit with more bad news. Nomar Garciaparra was lost after a leg injury that would keep him off the field except for pinch-hitting duties.

=== Game 3 ===
October 7, 2006 5:05 pm (PDT) at Dodger Stadium in Los Angeles, California 68 °F (20 °C), sunny
Team	1	2	3	4	5	6	7	8	9	R	H	E
New York	3	0	1	0	0	3	0	2	0	9	14	2
Los Angeles	0	0	0	2	3	0	0	0	0	5	16	2
WP: Pedro Feliciano (1–0) LP: Jonathan Broxton (0–1); Home runs: NYM: None; LAD: Jeff Kent (1); Attendance: 56,293; Boxscore

In Los Angeles, the Mets loaded the bases in the first with one out on a walk and two singles off veteran starter Greg Maddux before RBI singles by David Wright, Cliff Floyd and Shawn Green put them up 3–0. In the third, Floyd singled with two outs before scoring on Green's double. In the fourth, the Dodgers loaded the bases on three singles off Mets starter Steve Trachsel with one out before rookie first baseman James Loney, starting in place of the injured Nomar Garciaparra, drove in two with a single to center. In the fifth, Marlon Anderson singled with two outs before Jeff Kent's home run off reliever Darren Oliver tied the game at four. After allowing a single to J. D. Drew, Oliver was relieved by Chad Bradford, who allowed a single and walk to load the bases. Pedro Feliciano relieved Bradford and walked Loney to put the Dodgers up 5–4. In the top of the sixth, Shawn Green hit a leadoff double off Jonathan Broxton. After José Valentín popped out on the infield, pinch hitter Michael Tucker drew a walk. Three consecutive bloop hits from José Reyes, Paul Lo Duca, and Carlos Beltrán scored a run each, making it 7–5 Mets. Chris Woodward doubled to lead off the eighth off Brett Tomko and scored on Lo Duca's one-out single. After a walk, Takashi Saito relieved Tomko and an error on Carlos Delgado's ground ball made it 9–5 Mets. Aaron Heilman and Billy Wagner pitched a scoreless eighth and ninth, respectively, as the Mets swept a postseason series for the first time since the 1969 NLCS. Former Dodgers Green and Lo Duca finished with two RBI each.

=== Composite box ===
2006 NLDS (3–0): New York Mets over Los Angeles Dodgers

Team	1	2	3	4	5	6	7	8	9	R	H	E
New York Mets	3	0	2	2	1	7	2	2	0	19	30	3
Los Angeles Dodgers	0	1	0	2	3	0	3	1	1	11	32	4
Total attendance: 170,301 Average attendance: 56,767

== San Diego vs. St. Louis ==
This was the third postseason meeting between the San Diego Padres and St. Louis Cardinals. The previous two meetings were in the 1996 National League Division Series and 2005 National League Division Series, both of which St. Louis won in sweeps.

=== Game 1 ===
October 3, 2006 1:09 pm (PDT) at Petco Park in San Diego, California 71 °F (22 °C), sunny
Team	1	2	3	4	5	6	7	8	9	R	H	E
St. Louis	0	0	0	3	1	1	0	0	0	5	12	0
San Diego	0	0	0	0	0	1	0	0	0	1	6	0
WP: Chris Carpenter (1–0) LP: Jake Peavy (0–1); Home runs: STL: Albert Pujols (1); SD: None; Attendance: 43,107; Boxscore

In a pitching rematch of Game 1 of the 2005 NLDS, Chris Carpenter and Jake Peavy both started strong through three innings and it appeared that the pitcher's duel that was expected the previous year would occur this time around. That changed in the fourth inning when Chris Duncan hit a leadoff single, then Albert Pujols hit a two-run home run 422 feet (129 m) into one of the deepest parts of Petco Park. Jim Edmonds then singled, moved to third on Scott Rolen's double, and scored on Juan Encarnación's sacrifice fly. The Cardinals added to their lead on Edmonds's RBI single next inning that scored David Eckstein from third and in the sixth when Ronnie Belliard singled with one out, stole second, and scored on Yadier Molina's single to knock Peavy out of the game. Carpenter, on the other hand, continued his strong pitching performance as he pitched into the seventh inning, allowing just one run to cross the plate when Dave Roberts tripled with one out in the sixth and scored on Brian Giles's sacrifice fly. The Cardinal bullpen, which had been shaky down the stretch, pitched the final 2 2/3 innings of the game allowing just one hit. The Cardinals led the best-of-five series one game to none.

=== Game 2 ===
October 5, 2006 1:09 pm (PDT) at Petco Park in San Diego, California 69 °F (21 °C), partly cloudy
Team	1	2	3	4	5	6	7	8	9	R	H	E
St. Louis	0	0	0	2	0	0	0	0	0	2	10	0
San Diego	0	0	0	0	0	0	0	0	0	0	4	0
WP: Jeff Weaver (1–0) LP: David Wells (0–1) Sv: Adam Wainwright (1); Attendance: 43,463; Boxscore

Cardinal starter Jeff Weaver and four relievers combined on a four-hitter to shut out the Padres 2–0. The only runs scored in the game came in the fourth when Preston Wilson hit a leadoff double and scored on a single by Albert Pujols, who reached second on Dave Roberts's throw to home. Pujols moved to third on a groundout before scoring on Jim Edmonds's RBI single. Padres starter David Wells pitched five solid innings in a losing effort.

=== Game 3 ===
October 7, 2006 12:11 pm (CDT) at Busch Stadium (III) in St. Louis, Missouri 66 °F (19 °C), sunny
Team	1	2	3	4	5	6	7	8	9	R	H	E
San Diego	0	0	0	3	0	0	0	0	0	3	10	0
St. Louis	0	0	0	0	0	0	0	1	0	1	5	2
WP: Chris Young (1–0) LP: Jeff Suppan (0–1) Sv: Trevor Hoffman (1); Home runs: SD: None; STL: So Taguchi (1); Attendance: 46,634; Boxscore

Game 3 ended the Padres' eight-game winless streak against the Cardinals in the postseason and gave them their first postseason win since Game 6 of the 1998 NLCS. However, they left 14 runners on base. The Padres scored their runs in the third off Jeff Suppan when he allowed a one-out double to Adrián González and walked Mike Cameron before both men scored on Russell Branyan's double to left, with Branyan reaching third on Chris Duncan's throw to home. Branyan then scored on Geoff Blum's sacrifice fly. The Cardinals scored their only run in the eighth on So Taguchi's home run off reliever Scott Linebrink.

Game 3 of this series marked ESPN's most recent Division Series telecast to date. The network would not broadcast another postseason game again until the 2014 National League Wild Card Game.

=== Game 4 ===
October 8, 2006 7:16 pm (CDT) at Busch Stadium (III) in St. Louis, Missouri 69 °F (21 °C), partly cloudy
Team	1	2	3	4	5	6	7	8	9	R	H	E
San Diego	2	0	0	0	0	0	0	0	0	2	9	1
St. Louis	2	0	0	0	0	4	0	0	X	6	7	0
WP: Chris Carpenter (2–0) LP: Woody Williams (0–1); Attendance: 46,476; Boxscore

After losing Game 3, Cardinals manager Tony La Russa decided to use Carpenter to start Game 4 in hopes of closing out the Series at home. Carpenter started off shakily, allowing back-to-back one hit singles to Brian Giles and Adrián González and walking Josh Bard to load the bases. Russell Branyan walked to force in a run before Mike Cameron's ground out scored another. Carpenter settled down and pitched six scoreless innings before being pulled in the eighth.

St. Louis answered by loaded the bases in the bottom of the inning off Woody Williams on a single, walk and hit-by-pitch with two outs before Ronnie Belliard tied the game with a two-run single, but was tagged out at second to end the inning. The game remained tied until the seventh when Albert Pujols drew a leadoff walk and scored on Juan Encarnación's triple. Williams was replaced with Cla Meredith, who hit Belliard with a pitch before allowing an RBI single to Scott Spiezio. Yadier Molina's single loaded the bases before Padre third baseman Branyan's throwing error to second on Carpenter's ground ball scored Belliard and kept the bases loaded. David Eckstein's sacrifice bunt scored Spiezio to give the Cardinals a 6–2 lead. Rookie pitcher Adam Wainwright pitched a scoreless ninth despite allowing two hits to close out the Series and allow the Cardinals to advance to the NLCS for the third consecutive year.

The offensive woes that plagued the Padres in the first three games continued for the Padres in Game 4. The team failed to score after the first, and went a combined 2-for-32 with runners in scoring position in the Series.

It was the final Division Series game televised by Fox until 2022. While Fox Sports would reclaim partial Division Series broadcasting rights in 2014, most of their Division Series games since have been broadcast on FS1.

The Padres would not return to the postseason until 2020.

=== Composite box ===
2006 NLDS (3–1): St. Louis Cardinals over San Diego Padres

Team	1	2	3	4	5	6	7	8	9	R	H	E
St. Louis Cardinals	2	0	0	5	1	5	0	1	0	14	34	2
San Diego Padres	2	0	0	3	0	1	0	0	0	6	29	1
Total attendance: 179,680 Average attendance: 44,920
