= Paul Konerko =

American baseball player (born 1976)

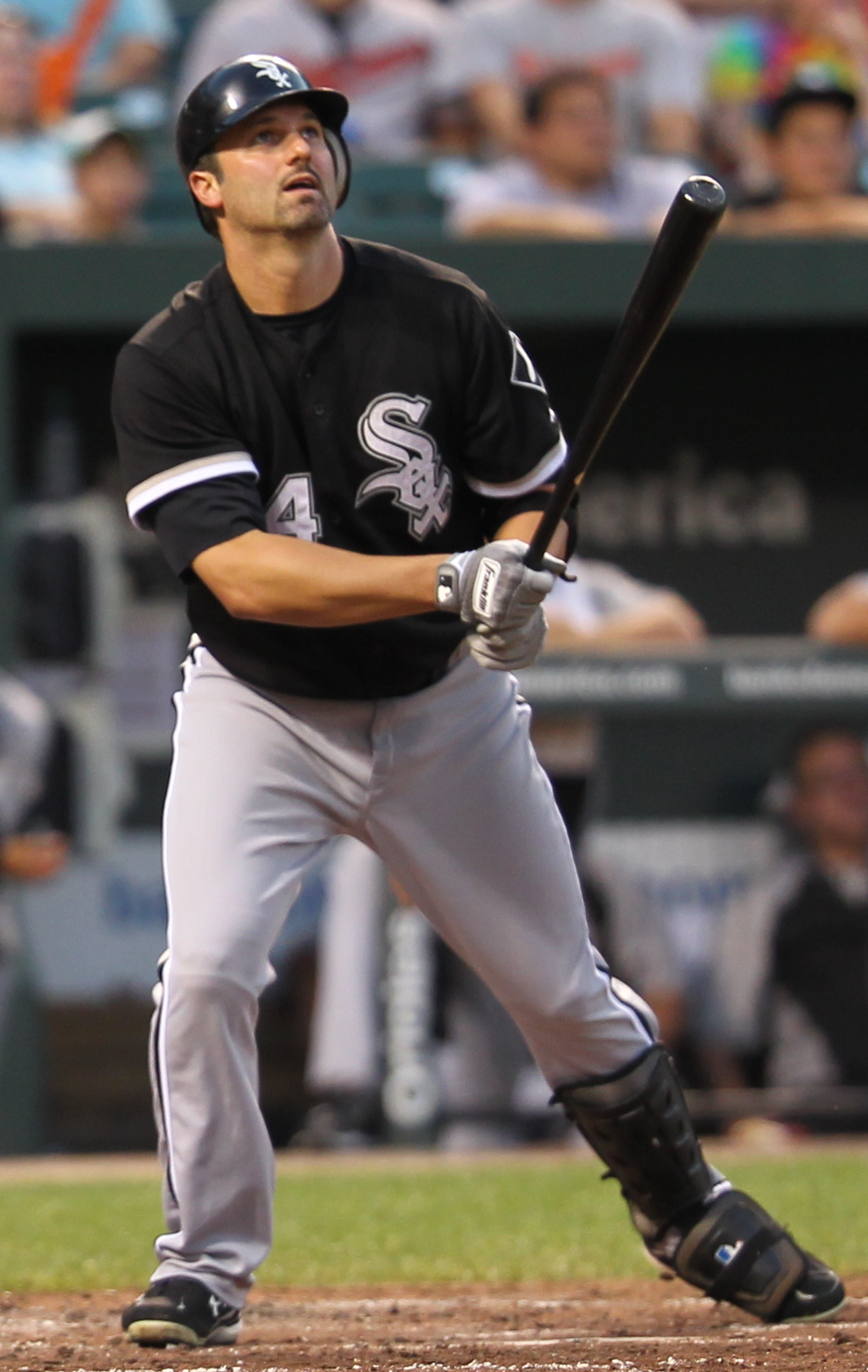
- Konerko with the Chicago White Sox in 2011
- First baseman
- Born: March 5, 1976 (age 50); Providence, Rhode Island, U.S.
- Batted: Right Threw: Right

MLB debut
- September 8, 1997, for the Los Angeles Dodgers

Last MLB appearance
- September 28, 2014, for the Chicago White Sox

MLB statistics
- Batting average: .279
- Hits: 2,340
- Home runs: 439
- Runs batted in: 1,412
- Stats at Baseball Reference

Teams
- Los Angeles Dodgers (1997–1998); Cincinnati Reds (1998); Chicago White Sox (1999–2014)

Career highlights and awards
- 6× All-Star (2002, 2005, 2006, 2010–2012); World Series champion (2005); ALCS MVP (2005); Roberto Clemente Award (2014); Chicago White Sox No. 14 retired

Paul Henry Konerko (/kəˈnɛərkoʊ/ kə-NAIR-koh; born March 5, 1976) is an American former professional baseball player. He played in Major League Baseball (MLB) as a first baseman from 1997 to 2014, most prominently as a member of the Chicago White Sox, where he was a six-time American League All-Star and team captain for the 2005 World Series winning team. Konerko began his career with the Los Angeles Dodgers and the Cincinnati Reds. In 2014, Konerko was named the recipient of the prestigious Roberto Clemente Award.

== High school career ==
Born in Providence, Rhode Island, to Henry ("Hank") and Elena Konerko, Konerko is of Polish and Italian descent. At Chaparral High School in Scottsdale, Arizona, Konerko was named the Arizona Republic/Phoenix Gazette Player of the Year as a senior, after leading his team to a Class 4-A state championship. Konerko hit .558 in 1994, the school season record until Ike Davis, who later became a Major League first baseman, hit .559 in 2003. Konerko also held the school season record in doubles, with 18, until Davis hit 23 doubles in 2003. He also held the school career record in doubles (44), until Davis passed him with 48 doubles. As of 2014, he was the school's all-time leader in home runs and RBI. Konerko was ranked the #1 catcher in the nation during his senior year in high school.

He signed a letter of intent to play college baseball at Arizona State.

== Professional career ==
=== Los Angeles Dodgers and Cincinnati Reds ===
Konerko was drafted in the first round (13th overall) of the 1994 MLB draft by the Los Angeles Dodgers. Konerko had been on the radar of Eddie Bane, the special assistant to Dodgers general manager Fred Claire, since he was 13 years old.

On May 13, 1995, with the Single-A San Bernardino Spirit, he drove in the only run of a 21-inning game. It was the longest shutout in California League history.

Konerko played for the Triple-A Albuquerque Dukes for the majority of the 1997 season, batting .323 with 37 home runs and 127 RBI in 130 games. He is one of four Dodgers position players to have been twice selected for the Dodgers organization's "Minor League Player of the Year" award, along with Billy Ashley, Joc Pederson, and Gavin Lux.

On September 8, 1997, Konerko made his major league debut with the Dodgers against the Florida Marlins as a pinch hitter, hitting a single off Marlins pitcher Dennis Cook for his first career hit. He would finish with one hits in six at-bats with a walk in six major league games with the Dodgers to close out the season. In 1998, Konerko played in 49 games with the Dodgers, batting .215 with four home runs and 16 RBI.

On July 4, 1998, Konerko was traded along with left-handed pitcher Dennys Reyes to the Cincinnati Reds for All-Star closer Jeff Shaw. Konerko played 26 games with the Reds, batting .219 with three home runs and 13 RBI.

=== Chicago White Sox ===
==== 1999–2005: early years, World Series champion ====
On November 11, 1998, Konerko was traded by the Reds to the White Sox for Mike Cameron. Konerko became a consistent hitter and power threat upon his arrival to the White Sox, hitting for a .294 average with 24 home runs and 81 RBI in 142 games during his first season with Chicago in 1999.

In 2000, Konerko finished the season batting .298 with 21 home runs and 97 RBI in 143 games. The White Sox finished with a 95–67 record, and made the playoffs for the first time since 1993. Konerko made his first postseason appearance that year, when the White Sox lost to the Seattle Mariners in the 2000 American League Division Series (ALDS). The Mariners swept the series in three games, and in nine at-bats, Konerko did not record a hit. He got on base once via a walk.

Konerko continued to hit consistently in 2001, hitting .282 with 32 home runs and 99 RBI in 156 games, reaching the 30-homer plateau for the first time in his career. The next season, he reached 100 RBI for the first time, finishing with a .304 average, 27 home runs and 104 RBI in 151 games. This culminated in his first All-Star appearance at Miller Park, where he also participated in the Home Run Derby, hitting 12 home runs in the two rounds he appeared in. In the 2002 All-Star Game, Konerko hit a two-run double for the American League in the top of the seventh inning to grab the lead. Broadcasters Tim McCarver and Joe Buck stated that if the American League had won the game, Konerko would have been the MVP; however, the game ended in a tie and the MVP was not awarded.

Konerko suffered a thumb injury in 2003 that reduced his playing time to 137 games and resulted in a drop in offensive production. He finished the season batting just .234 with 18 home runs and 65 RBI.

In 2004, Konerko bounced back in a big way, eclipsing the 40 home run mark for the first time in his career. In 155 games, he hit .277 while setting career highs with 41 home runs and 117 RBI. Konerko finished 16th in the MVP voting that year as the White Sox finished second in the division to the Minnesota Twins.

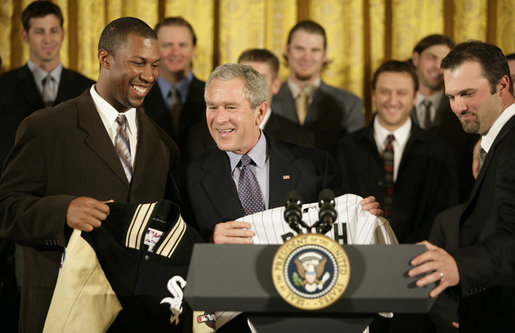
Konerko (right) and Jermaine Dye (left) present a jersey to then-President George W. Bush as the White Sox are honored at the White House for their victory in the 2005 World Series.

In 2005, Konerko and the White Sox got off to a hot start with a 17–7 record at the end of April and never looked back. They became only the fifth team in Major League history to go wire-to-wire, staying in first place every day of the season, and the first team since the 1990 Cincinnati Reds to do so. Konerko finished the season batting .283 with 40 home runs, his second time hitting the mark, and 100 RBI in 158 games as the White Sox won the division for the first time since 2000.

Konerko continued hitting hot into the playoffs with a home run in Games 1 and 3 of the ALDS against the Boston Red Sox. With Konerko's help, the White Sox swept the defending champions in three games to move on to their first ALCS since 1993. The White Sox defeated the Los Angeles Angels of Anaheim in the American League Championship Series (ALCS). After going 0-for-4 in Game 1 and 1-for-4 in Game 2, Konerko went 3-for-4 with three RBI in the Game 3 against the Angels. Two of the RBIs came from a home run in the first inning. In Game 4, Konerko was 1-for-4 with 3 RBI on another first inning home run, the second in as many nights. His Game 4 home run set a franchise record for most home runs in a postseason and all-time with his fourth career postseason home run, passing Ted Kluszewski's three home runs in the 1959 World Series. In Game 5, Konerko went 1-for-5 with another RBI. He was named the ALCS MVP on the strength of a .268 batting average, two home runs and seven RBI, becoming the first, and as of the 2025 season, only White Sox player to receive the award. He said, "I think you could split this four ways," referring to his feeling that the MVP should be awarded to the White Sox starting pitchers who pitched four consecutive complete games in the ALCS.

In Game 2 of the 2005 World Series, Konerko hit the first grand slam in White Sox World Series history to put the White Sox ahead 6–4. It was also the first grand slam in postseason history to give a team the lead when trailing in the seventh inning or later. He became the 18th player in Major League history to hit a grand slam in the World Series and the first since Tino Martinez in 1998. Those were Konerko's only RBIs of the World Series, but they were critical in giving the White Sox the momentum to complete a four-game sweep of the Houston Astros. His RBI total was also the highest on the White Sox during the series. Konerko caught the final out for every one of the series-clinching games throughout the playoffs. Konerko hit .265 with five home runs and 15 RBI during the White Sox' championship run, all White Sox postseason records.

==== 2006–2014: team captain ====
Following the 2005 World Series victory, Konerko signed a five-year $60 million deal with the White Sox on November 30, 2005, after reportedly turning down more lucrative offers from the Los Angeles Angels and the Baltimore Orioles.

With the departure of Frank Thomas, Konerko became the new official face of the White Sox franchise. Konerko concluded the 2006 season batting .313 with 35 home runs and 113 RBI in 152 games, helping him rank in the top 10 for total home runs over the past three seasons, after hitting over 40 home runs in 2004 and 2005.

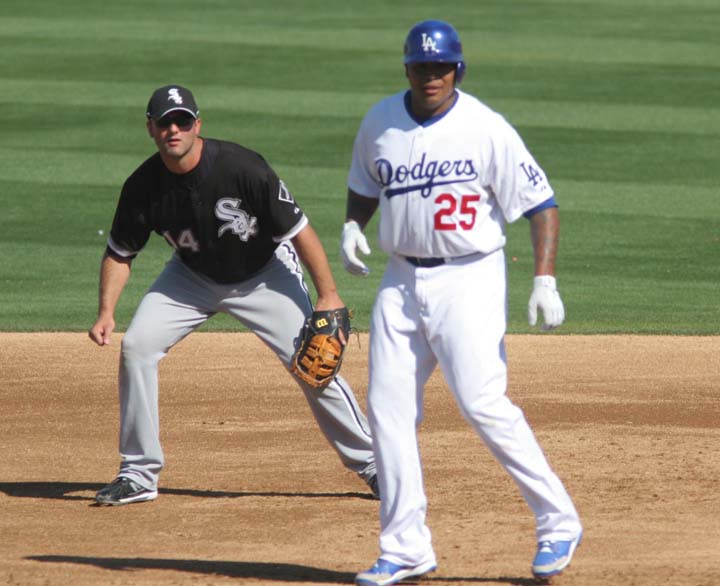
Konerko (left) and Andruw Jones during a spring training game in 2008

In 2008, Konerko again injured his thumb in the first half of the season, resulting in him being limited to 122 games. He hit .240 with 22 home runs and 62 RBI. On September 18, 2008, Konerko became the last opposing player to hit a home run at Yankee Stadium in the ninth inning of a 9–2 White Sox loss. Konerko and the White Sox defeated the Minnesota Twins in a dramatic 1–0 victory in the tie-breaker game to decide the AL Central winner and move on to the playoffs. In the 2008 American League Division Series, Konerko hit two home runs and drove in two runs in a quick exit for the White Sox, who lost the series to the eventual American League Champion Tampa Bay Rays in four games.

On April 13, 2009, Konerko connected back to back with Jermaine Dye for the 300th home run of both players' respective careers off of Detroit Tigers pitcher Zach Miner. This was the first time that this had ever happened in Major League history; where two players had hit a century milestone home run in one game, let alone back to back.

On July 7, 2009, Konerko was 3-for-4 with three home runs and 7 RBIs in a 10–6 win against the Cleveland Indians. It was the first time in his big league career that he hit three home runs in a game. He is also the only White Sox player to accomplish that at U.S. Cellular Field.

On July 10, 2010, Konerko was announced to replace Twins first baseman Justin Morneau at the 2010 Major League Baseball All-Star Game. This was the fourth All-Star selection of his career. Near the end of the 2010 season, Konerko was hit in the face by Minnesota Twins pitcher Carl Pavano. This resulted in major controversy. White Sox pitcher Mark Buehrle returned the favor in the next inning hitting Twins first baseman Michael Cuddyer. Both teams then received a warning from the head umpire and no further incidents occurred. Refusing to leave the game, Konerko hit a solo home run on the first pitch he saw in his next at bat against Pavano.

Konerko finished the 2010 season with 39 home runs, his most since 2005 and the third-highest total of his career, as well as a .312 average and 111 RBI in 149 games. Additionally, he was in fifth place in the year's MVP voting, the highest finish of his career to date.

On December 8, 2010, Konerko re-signed with the White Sox on a three-year, $37.5 million contract. On June 1, 2011, Konerko hit his 377th career home run in a game against the Boston Red Sox, passing former White Sox player Carlton Fisk on the all-time home run list.

On June 10, 2011, Konerko hit a home run in a game against the Oakland Athletics, setting the franchise record for consecutive games with an extra base hit at nine games. On June 20, 2011, Konerko hit his 385th career home run in a game against the Chicago Cubs, passing former White Sox player Harold Baines on the all-time home run list. On June 21, 2011, Konerko continued his hot June when he homered in a game against the Cubs, marking his fifth straight game with a home run, becoming the fifth player in White Sox history to hit a home run in five consecutive games. The other five are Greg Luzinski, Ron Kittle, Frank Thomas (twice), Carlos Lee, and most recently A. J. Pierzynski in 2012. Konerko made it onto his fifth All-Star team after winning the Final Vote contest for the American League.

On August 23, 2011, Konerko recorded his 2,000th hit in the top of the eighth inning against the Angels.

Konerko finished the season with 31 home runs, 105 RBIs, and a .300 batting average in 149 games, the fifth time in his career that he finished with 30 home runs and 100+ RBIs.

In October 2011, White Sox general manager Kenny Williams admitted that he briefly considered naming Konerko player-manager for Chicago after the departure of manager Ozzie Guillén. However, Williams never discussed the possibility with Konerko. Former White Sox player Robin Ventura was named manager for the upcoming 2012 season. There has not been a player-manager in Major League Baseball since Pete Rose served in the capacity for the Cincinnati Reds in 1986.

In November 2011, Konerko was inducted into the Arizona Fall League Hall of Fame along with Phillies first baseman Ryan Howard.

On April 25, 2012, Konerko hit his 400th career home run, passing Al Kaline and Andrés Galarraga and becoming the 48th player in Major League history to hit 400 home runs. Konerko was named the American League Player of the Week for the week of April 23–29. He hit .435 with three home runs and 4 RBI. He led the AL in slugging and total bases that week.

Konerko continued his hot hitting into the month of May as he racked up his second American League Player of the Week award of the season for the week of May 23–29. He hit .583 with three home runs, 10 RBI, and a 14-game hitting streak, including his 400th career home run as a member of the White Sox, becoming only the second player in franchise history to hit 400 home runs, Frank Thomas being the first.

On July 1, 2012, Konerko was elected by his peers, along with teammates Adam Dunn, Jake Peavy and Chris Sale to the 83rd All-Star Game in Kansas City. It was his sixth All-star appearance and his third in three years.

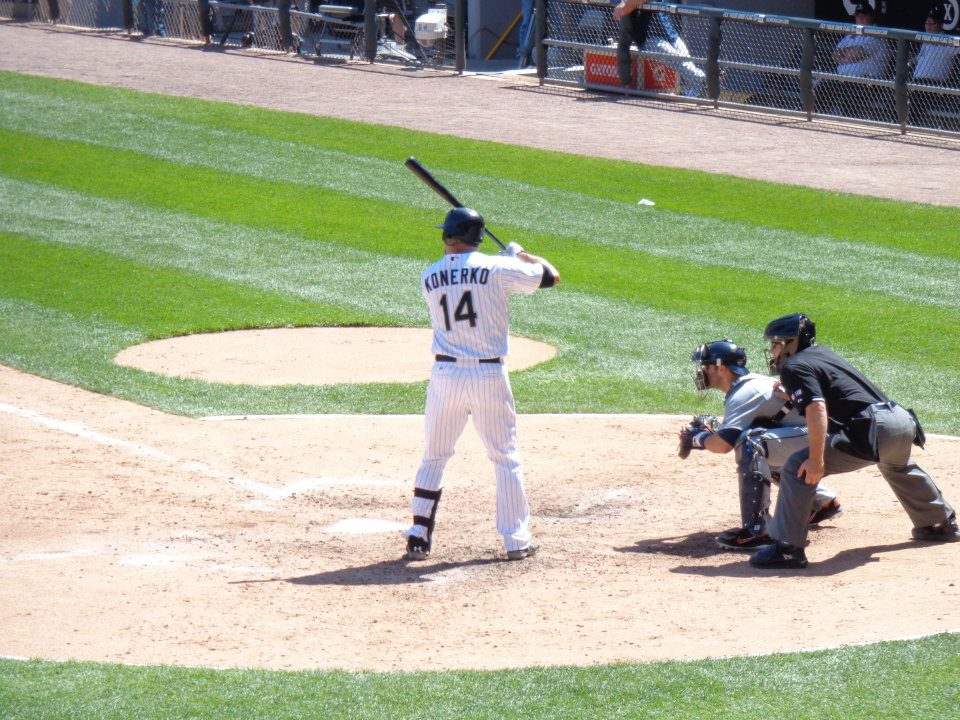
Paul Konerko batting against the Detroit Tigers in 2012

Konerko's production declined in 2013, as he finished the season hitting .244 with 12 home runs and 54 RBI in 126 games, his lowest number of both home runs and RBI since joining the White Sox. On December 4, 2013, Konerko re-signed with the White Sox to a one-year, $2.5 million contract.

Throughout the 2014 season, Konerko was honored and given a variety of farewell gifts during road games from various teams throughout baseball, including the Twins, Yankees, Indians, Royals, and crosstown rival Cubs.

On April 23, 2014, Konerko doubled off of Detroit Tigers pitcher Justin Miller to break Frank Thomas' franchise total bases record with his 3,950th total base.

On May 7, 2014, Konerko played in his final game against the crosstown rival Cubs. Konerko went 2-for-3, including a bases-clearing three-run double in the bottom of the fifth inning to put the Sox in the lead for good as they went on to win 8–3. Konerko would finish his career with 20 home runs against the Cubs. Konerko would hit his 439th and final home run on the July 4 in a home game against the Seattle Mariners, the same team that he hit his first Major League home run against in 1998, in a 7–1 win for the White Sox.

During the final homestand of the season, Konerko was honored during a pregame ceremony on September 27, 2014, before a game against the Kansas City Royals. A statue of Konerko out in the left field concourse, adjacent to the Frank Thomas statue, was revealed during the ceremony and the fan that caught his 2005 World Series grand slam delivered the ball to Konerko as a parting gift. Konerko played in his final game on September 28, 2014, in the last game of the season at home. Konerko went 0-for-3 before being replaced in the top of the sixth inning by Andy Wilkins and leaving the field to a standing ovation from the crowd of 32,266. Upon his retirement, Konerko finished in the top three in most offensive categories with the White Sox with 432 home runs (second), 2,292 hits (third), 1,383 RBIs (second), 406 doubles (third), and 4,010 total bases (first). Konerko is also the White Sox postseason leader in both home runs and RBI with 7 and 17 respectively.

Aaron Rowand, one of Konerko's teammates, praised the slugger's leadership abilities. "He’s definitely very even-keeled, but stay out of his way if he has a rough game. He’ll blow up a little bit. He knows this organization, and most of us have played together for quite some time now. Everybody looks up to Paul as a leader and team captain. He does a good job with it and brings guys along for the ride.”

== Retirement ==
Paul Konerko's number 14 was retired by the Chicago White Sox in 2015.

Konerko retired on September 28, 2014, after spending 18 years in Major League Baseball, the last 16 of which were with the White Sox. All but 81 of Konerko's 2,349 career MLB games were played with the White Sox. Konerko was the last member of the 2005 champion White Sox left on the team at the time of his retirement. It was announced on Paul Konerko Day that his number (#14) would be retired and the statue of Konerko was revealed in the left field concourse, becoming the ninth player to be honored with a statue by the White Sox. On October 24, 2014, Konerko was named the co-winner of the Roberto Clemente Award, sharing the honor with Jimmy Rollins of the Philadelphia Phillies. By winning the award, Konerko became the first member of the White Sox to do so. On May 23, 2015, prior to a game against the Minnesota Twins at U.S. Cellular Field, Konerko became the tenth White Sox player to have his number retired. His #14 is the eleventh overall number retired by the team as Jackie Robinson's #42 was retired by the whole MLB in 1997.

In May 2016, the White Sox celebrated U.S. Cellular Field's 25th anniversary by introducing the 25 most memorable moments in the park's history. In a bracket style competition, Konerko's grand slam in Game 2 of the 2005 World Series was voted the best moment in the park's 25-year history, as it was deemed as an iconic moment in the breaking of the franchise's 88 year championship drought.

== Career statistics ==
In 2,349 games over 18 seasons, Konerko posted a .279 batting average (2,340-for-8,393) with 1,162 runs, 410 doubles, 439 home runs, 1412 RBI, 921 bases on balls, .354 on-base percentage and .486 slugging percentage. He finished his career with a .995 fielding percentage as a first baseman.

== Hall of Fame eligibility ==
In 2020, his first year of Hall of Fame eligibility, Konerko received 2.5% of votes, below the 5% threshold, and has been subsequently removed from future ballots.

== Personal life ==
Konerko married Jennifer Wells in 2004. They have two sons and a daughter: Nicholas, Owen, and Amelia.

A fan of the band Metallica, Konerko's walk-up music throughout most of his tenure with the White Sox was the song "Harvester of Sorrow" from Metallica's 1988 album ...And Justice For All. The song became synonymous with Konerko in Chicago and his looming presence at the plate.

== See also ==
- List of Major League Baseball career home run leaders
- List of Major League Baseball career hits leaders
- List of Major League Baseball career doubles leaders
- List of Major League Baseball career runs batted in leaders
- List of Major League Baseball career runs scored leaders
- List of Major League Baseball career total bases leaders
- List of Major League Baseball career strikeouts by batters leaders

Preceded by Jason Giambi	American League Player of the Month; June 2002	Succeeded by Alex Rodriguez
