= Michel Hernández =

Cuban baseball player (born 1978)

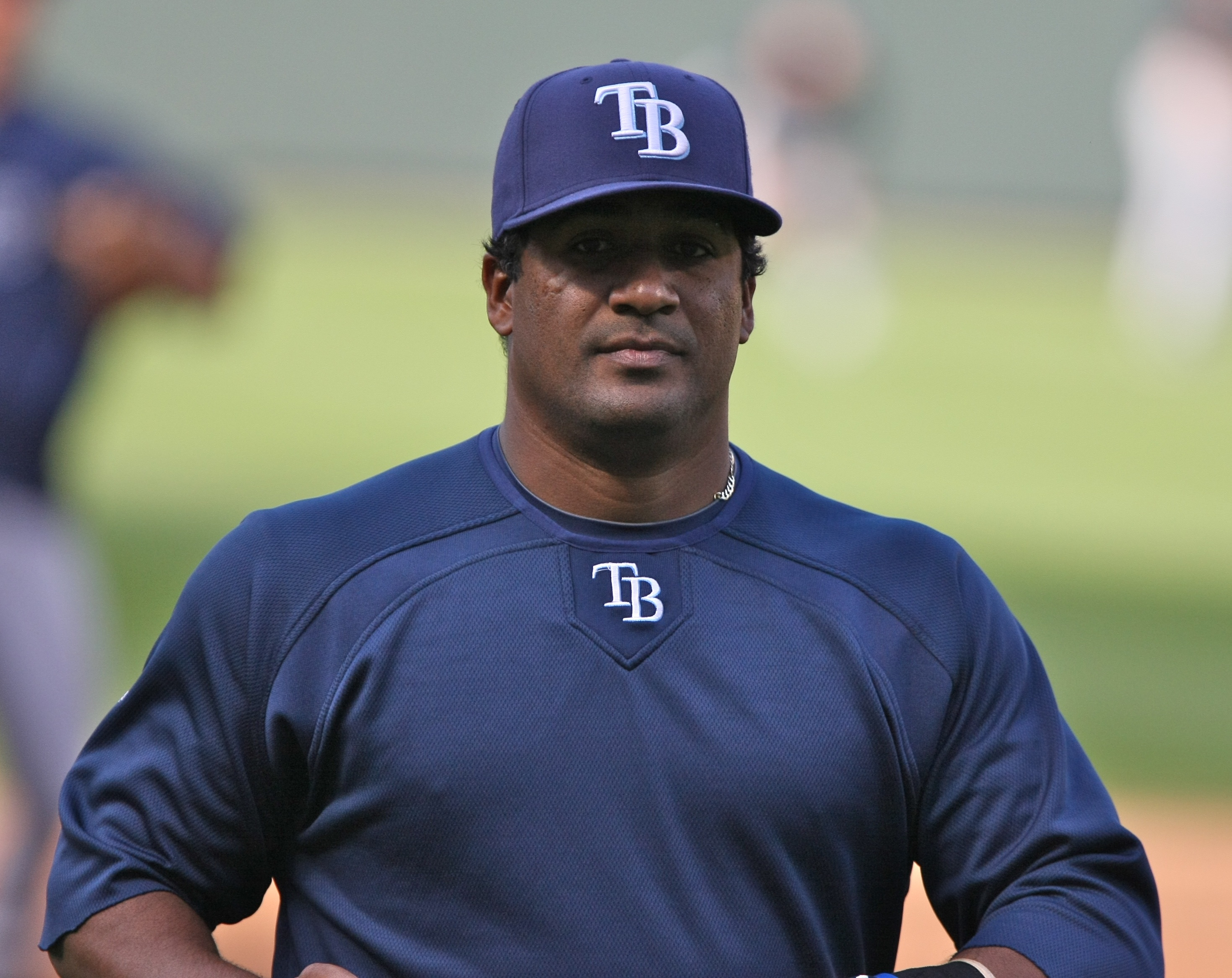
- Hernández with the Tampa Bay Rays
- Catcher
- Born: August 12, 1978 (age 48); Havana, Cuba
- Batted: Right Threw: Right

MLB debut
- September 6, 2003, for the New York Yankees

Last MLB appearance
- August 5, 2009, for the Tampa Bay Rays

MLB statistics
- Batting average: .237
- Home runs: 1
- Runs batted in: 12
- Stats at Baseball Reference

Teams
- New York Yankees (2003); Tampa Bay Rays (2008–2009)

Michel Hernández (born August 12, 1978) is a Cuban-American former Major League Baseball (MLB) catcher. He is now a minor league catching instructor with the New York Yankees organization.

== Professional career ==
Hernández defected from Cuba in 1996. He signed with the New York Yankees as an undrafted free agent on May 11, 1998.

From 1998 to 2003, Hernández was in the Yankees organization. Hernández was first placed on the 40-man roster on November 21, 2002, in order to protect him from the Rule 5 draft. On September 1, 2003, Hernández was called up by the major league team. On September 6, against the Boston Red Sox, Hernández made his major league debut, coming into the game as a defensive replacement for Jorge Posada. On September 26, against the Baltimore Orioles, Hernández made his first career start and got his first career hit, a single off Rodrigo López. In total, Hernández played in 5 games in 2003, going 1–4.

On January 8, 2004, Hernández was claimed off waivers by the Boston Red Sox. Prior to that, he had been designated for assignment on December 23, 2003. On March 24, 2004, Hernández was claimed off waivers again, this time by the Philadelphia Phillies. Hernández would go on to play the entire 2004 season with the Phillies Triple-A team, the Scranton/Wilkes-Barre Red Barons. He split time with veteran A. J. Hinch, with both playing 77 games. Hernández batted .254 with 6 home runs and 31 RBI. On December 20, 2004, Hernández was designated for assignment. The next day, he became a free agent, as the Phillies decline to offer him a new contract.

Hernández signed a minor league contract with the San Diego Padres on January 18, 2005. He was invited to spring training and there he hit .520 in 19 games. Hernández did not make the major league team and was reassigned to the minor leagues on April 2. Hernández spent the entire 2005 season in Triple-A with the Portland Beavers. In 82 games, he batted .288 with 3 home runs. After the season, Hernández opted for minor league free agency on October 28. On November 14, 2005, the St. Louis Cardinals signed him to a one-year major league contract.

Hernández spent the entire 2006 season in Triple-A again. Playing for the Memphis Redbirds, he batted .274 with 2 home runs in 90 games. Hernández was designated for assignment on January 29, 2007 and was outrighted to Triple-A the next day. On March 5, 2007, Hernández was reassigned to minor league camp and became a free agent.

Hernández began the 2007 season in the independent league, playing for the Somerset Patriots of the Atlantic League. Through 25 games with them, he batted .342. On June 9, Hernández was signed to a minor league contract by the Tampa Bay Devil Rays. He finished the 2007 season in Triple-A with the Durham Bulls. In 51 games for the Bulls, he batted .276 with 4 home runs. After the season, he opted for minor league free agency on November 3.

On December 21, 2007, the Pittsburgh Pirates signed Hernández to a minor league contract with an invitation to spring training. He did not make the team and was assigned to play for Triple-A Indianapolis. On August 31, 2008, Hernández was traded to the Tampa Bay Rays for cash considerations. Due to an injury to regular backup Shawn Riggans, he was active for the entire 2008 postseason. He did not appear in any playoff games and was released after the postseason ended, but re-signed to a minor league contract in January.

On April 14, 2009, Hernandez's contract was purchased by the Rays when Shawn Riggans was placed on the 15-day disabled list.

On April 30, 2009, he hit his first home run of the season (also of his career) against the Red Sox's starter Josh Beckett.

On August 8, 2009, Hernández was designated for assignment to make room on the active roster for Gregg Zaun.

On November 10, 2009, Hernández was signed by the Baltimore Orioles.

Hernández signed a minor league contract with the Cleveland Indians on November 10, 2011, with an invitation to Spring Training. He re-signed with the Indians in 2012 and was again invited to spring training. Following the season, he signed as a defensive coach with the New York Yankees organization.

== Personal life ==
A native of Cuba, Hernández now lives in Lutz, Florida. In 1996, with the Havana Industriales, he and four other teammates fled a stadium in Mexico while they were there for a series of games. Hernández, his wife Marta and his son Michael live in Lutz, Florida. He is now a minor league catcher instructor with the New York Yankees organization.

== See also ==
- List of baseball players who defected from Cuba
