= Marty Foster =

American baseball umpire (born 1963)

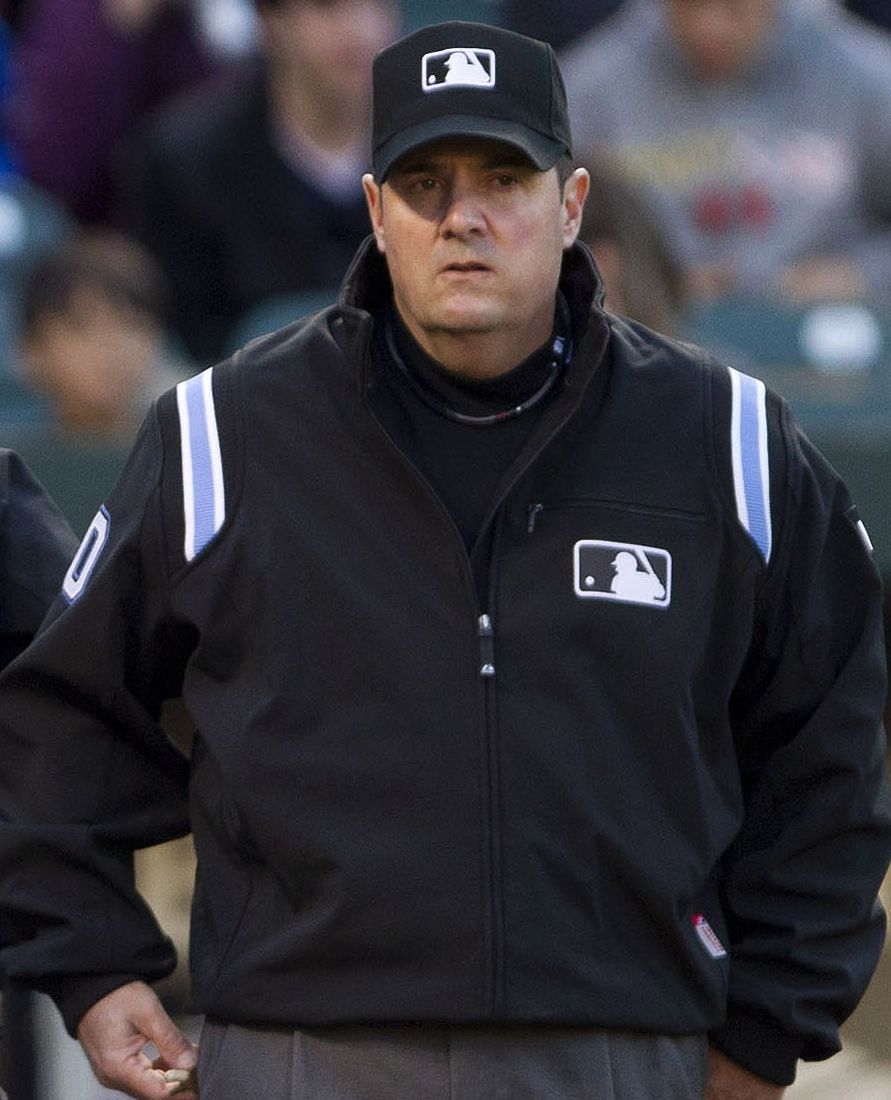
- Foster in 2012
- Born: November 25, 1963 (age 62); Denver, Colorado, U.S.

MLB debut
- September 10, 1996

Last appearance
- August 16, 2022

Career highlights and awards
- Special Assignments: All-Star Games (2002, 2016); Wild Card Game (2020); Division Series (2006, 2008, 2017)

Martin Robert Foster (born November 25, 1963) is an American former Major League Baseball umpire. After first working in the American League in 1996, he was added to the MLB umpiring staff in 2000. Foster retired following the 2022 season.

== Umpiring career ==
Before reaching the major leagues, Foster umpired in the Appalachian League, Midwest League, Southern League, International League, Pacific Coast League, and American Association.

His first post-season assignment was the 2006 National League Division Series. He also umpired the 2008 American League Division Series and the 2002 All-Star Game.

=== Notable games ===
Foster was the home plate umpire on July 15, 2005, in a game between the Detroit Tigers and Kansas City Royals, where, after the benches had been warned, Runelvys Hernández hit Carlos Guillén in the head with a pitch sparking a brawl that lasted nearly 10 minutes, and resulted in 7 players being ejected.

Foster was the home plate umpire for 300th career win of Tom Glavine, on August 5, 2007, at Wrigley Field. He was the second base umpire for Tampa Bay Rays pitcher Matt Garza's no hitter against the Detroit Tigers on July 26, 2010. Foster ejected Tigers manager Jim Leyland from that game during the third inning.

In a 2001 spring training game, Foster was the plate umpire during Major League Baseball's first use of video monitoring of umpire strike zones. The video monitoring was part of an effort by baseball officials to enforce the rule book definition of the strike zone.

Foster was at first base in the last game played at the old Yankee Stadium.

While serving as the plate umpire during an April 8, 2013, game between the Tampa Bay Rays and Texas Rangers, Foster made a controversial strike three call on Ben Zobrist that catcher A. J. Pierzynski did not even try to frame. It ended the game and gave Joe Nathan, who was seen on camera saying "Wow!" after this call, his 300th career save.

While serving as the plate umpire again an April 7, 2018, game between the Washington Nationals and New York Mets, Foster made a controversial strike three call on Anthony Rendon. Rendon flipped his bat, prompting Foster to eject him along with Nationals manager Dave Martinez.

== See also ==
- List of Major League Baseball umpires (disambiguation)
