= 2009 Baltimore Orioles season =

Major League Baseball season

2009 Baltimore Orioles
- League: American League
- Division: East
- Ballpark: Oriole Park at Camden Yards
- City: Baltimore
- Record: 64–98 (.395)
- Divisional place: 5th
- Owners: Peter Angelos
- General managers: Andy MacPhail
- Managers: Dave Trembley
- Television: MASN; WJZ-TV (CBS 13)
- Radio: WHFS

The Baltimore Orioles' 2009 season was the 109th season in franchise history. The Orioles finished the season last in the AL East with a record of 64–98. It was the fifth consecutive season in which the Orioles had fewer wins than in previous year.

The Orioles missed the playoffs for the twelfth straight season, tying a record set between 1984 and 1995

== New uniforms ==
The Orioles debuted new uniforms at the Harborplace Gallery Mall on November 12, 2008. The team's new uniforms featured an updated, ornithologically correct oriole bird on their caps on a black crown with orange bill, a new patch incorporating the flag of the state of Maryland in a circle borrowed from their vintage 1960s and 1970s insignia, and the return of the city name (Baltimore) in script on the road uniforms for the first time since 1972.

== Regular season ==
=== Roster ===
2009 Baltimore Orioles
Roster
Pitchers: 34 Matt Albers; 28 Danys Báez; 25 Brian Bass; 35 Brad Bergesen; 49 Jason Berken; 24 Alberto Castillo; 24,56 Adam Eaton; 46 Jeremy Guthrie; 27 Mark Hendrickson; 53 Sean Henn; 63 David Hernandez; 51 Rich Hill; 43 Jim Johnson; 55 Chris Lambert; 62 Radhames Liz; 52 Brian Matusz; 41 Bob McCrory; 26 Cla Meredith; 31 Kam Mickolio; 37 Chris Ray; 45 Dennis Sarfate; 52 George Sherrill; 58 Alfredo Simón; 54 Chris Tillman; 32 Jamie Walker; 29 Chris Waters	Catchers: 16,54 Chad Moeller; 78 Guillermo Rodríguez; 15 Matt Wieters; 9 Gregg Zaun; Infielders: 12 Robert Andino; 9 Michael Aubrey; 17 Aubrey Huff; 3 César Izturis; 6 Melvin Mora; 1 Brian Roberts; 16,26 Oscar Salazar; 83 Justin Turner; 23 Ty Wigginton; Outfielders: 70 Jeff Fiorentino; 2 Ryan Freel; 10 Adam Jones; 21 Nick Markakis; 2,12,14 Lou Montañez; 18 Félix Pie; 14,60 Nolan Reimold; 30 Luke Scott	Manager: 47 Dave Trembley; Coaches: 48 Terry Crowley (hitting); 36 Alan Dunn (bullpen); 50 Dave Jauss (bench); 39 Rick Kranitz (pitching); 11 Juan Samuel (third base); 38 John Shelby (first base)

=== Season standings ===
AL East
Team	W	L	Pct.	GB	Home	Road
New York Yankees	103	59	.636	—	57‍–‍24	46‍–‍35
Boston Red Sox	95	67	.586	8	56‍–‍25	39‍–‍42
Tampa Bay Rays	84	78	.519	19	52‍–‍29	32‍–‍49
Toronto Blue Jays	75	87	.463	28	44‍–‍37	31‍–‍50
Baltimore Orioles	64	98	.395	39	39‍–‍42	25‍–‍56

=== Record vs. opponents ===
2009 American League record Source: MLB Standings Grid – 2009
Team	BAL	BOS	CWS	CLE	DET	KC	LAA	MIN	NYY	OAK	SEA	TB	TEX	TOR	NL
Baltimore	–	2–16	5–4	2–5	3–5	4–4	2–8	3–2	5–13	1–5	4–5	8–10	5–5	9–9	11–7
Boston	16–2	–	4–4	7–2	6–1	5–3	4–5	4–2	9–9	5–5	2–4	9–9	2–7	11–7	11–7
Chicago	4–5	4−4	–	10–8	9–9	9–9	5–4	6−12	3–4	4–5	4–5	6–2	2–4	1–6	12–6
Cleveland	5–2	2–7	8–10	–	4–14	10–8	2–4	8–10	3–5	2–5	6–4	5–3	1–8	4–4	5–13
Detroit	5–3	1–6	9–9	14–4	–	9–9	5–4	7–12	1–5	5–4	5–4	5–2	7–2	3–5	10–8
Kansas City	4–4	3–5	9–9	8–10	9–9	–	1–9	6–12	2–4	2–6	5–4	1–9	3–3	4–3	8–10
Los Angeles	8–2	5–4	4–5	4–2	4–5	9–1	–	6–4	5–5	12–7	10–9	4–2	8–11	4–4	14–4
Minnesota	2–3	2–4	12–6	10–8	12–7	12–6	4–6	–	0–7	4–6	5–5	3–3	6–4	3–5	12–6
New York	13–5	9–9	4–3	5–3	5–1	4–2	5–5	7–0	–	7–2	6–4	11–7	5–4	12–6	10–8
Oakland	5–1	5–5	5–4	5–2	4–5	6–2	7–12	6–4	2–7	–	5–14	6–4	11–8	3–6	5–13
Seattle	5–4	4–2	5–4	4–6	4–5	4–5	9–10	5–5	4–6	14–5	–	5–3	8–11	3–4	11–7
Tampa Bay	10–8	9–9	2–6	3–5	2–5	9–1	2–4	3–3	7–11	4–6	3–5	–	3–6	14–4	13–5
Texas	5–5	7–2	4–2	8–1	2–7	3–3	11–8	4–6	4–5	8–11	11–8	6–3	–	5–5	9–9
Toronto	9–9	7–11	6–1	4–4	5–3	3–4	4–4	5–3	6–12	6–3	4–3	4–14	5–5	–	7–11

- Source: MLB Standings Grid – 2009

=== Game log ===
2009 game log

April (9–13)
#	Date	Opponent	Score	Win	Loss	Save	Attendance	Record
1	April 6	Yankees	10–5	Guthrie (1–0)	Sabathia (0–1)		48,607	1–0
2	April 8	Yankees	7–5	Uehara (1–0)	Wang (0–1)	Sherrill (1)	22,856	2–0
3	April 9	Yankees	11–2	Burnett (1–0)	Simón (0–1)		28,534	2–1
4	April 10	Rays	5–4	Hendrickson (1–0)	Sonnanstine (0–1)	Sherrill (2)	22,866	3–1
5	April 11	Rays	6–0	Guthrie (2–0)	Niemann (0–1)		15,108	4–1
6	April 12	Rays	11–3	Shields (1–1)	Eaton (0–1)		15,531	4–2
7	April 13	@ Rangers	10–9	Uehara (2–0)	Padilla (1–1)	Sherrill (3)	12,184	5–2
8	April 14	@ Rangers	7–5 (10)	Johnson (1–0)	Guardado (0–1)		14,041	6–2
9	April 15	@ Rangers	19–6	Benson (1–1)	Hendrickson (1–1)		17,539	6–3
10	April 17	@ Red Sox	10–8	Ramírez (1–0)	Báez (0–1)	Papelbon (3)	38,266	6–4
11	April 18	@ Red Sox	6–4	Beckett (2–1)	Eaton (0–2)	Papelbon (4)	37,559	6–5
12	April 19	@ Red Sox	2–1	Lester (1–2)	Uehara (2–1)	Saito (1)	37,869	6–6
13	April 20	@ Red Sox	12–1	Masterson (1–0)	Hendrickson (1–2)		37,865	6–7
14	April 21	White Sox	10–3	Bergesen (1–0)	Contreras (0–3)		14,801	7–7
15	April 22	White Sox	8–2	Danks (2–0)	Guthrie (2–1)		10,868	7–8
16	April 23	White Sox	6–2	Eaton (1–2)	Colón (1–1)		11,723	8–8
17	April 24	Rangers	5–4	Wilson (1–2)	Sherrill (0–1)	Francisco (3)	24,319	8–9
18	April 25	Rangers	6–5	Feldman (1–0)	Hendrickson (1–3)	Francisco (4)	41,160	8–10
19	April 26	Rangers	8–5	Báez (1–1)	Jennings (0–1)	Sherrill (4)	22,896	9–10
20	April 27	Rangers	6–4	Harrison (1–2)	Albers (0–1)	Francisco (5)	10,621	9–11
21	April 28	Angels	7–5	Saunders (3–1)	Eaton (1–3)	Fuentes (4)	11,857	9–12
22	April 29	Angels	3–2	Loux (1–2)	Uehara (2–2)	Fuentes (5)	14,203	9–13

May (14–15)
#	Date	Opponent	Score	Win	Loss	Save	Attendance	Record
23	May 1	@ Blue Jays	8–4	Halladay (5–1)	Hendrickson (1–4)		20,202	9–14
24	May 2	@ Blue Jays	5–4 (11)	Frasor (4–0)	Bass (0–1)		18,331	9–15
25	May 3	@ Blue Jays	4–3	Richmond (4–0)	Guthrie (2–2)	Downs (3)	20,418	9–16
26	May 4	@ Rays	8–4	Báez (2–1)	Kazmir (3–3)		12,658	10–16
27	May 5	@ Rays	6–3	Garza (3–2)	Uehara (2–3)	Percival (4)	13,174	10–17
28	May 6	Twins	4–1 (6)	Bass (1–1)	Slowey (4–1)		10,566	11–17
29	May 7	Twins	5–4	Johnson (2–0)	Mijares (0–1)	Sherrill (5)	11,399	12–17
30	May 8	Yankees	4–0	Sabathia (2–3)	Guthrie (2–3)		36,926	12–18
31	May 9	Yankees	12–5	Eaton (2–3)	Hughes (1–2)		41,825	13–18
32	May 10	Yankees	5–3	Chamberlain (2–1)	Johnson (2–1)	Rivera (6)	33,290	13–19
33	May 12	Rays	7–5	Bass (2–1)	Sonnanstine (1–4)	Sherrill (6)	17,122	14–19
34	May 13	Rays	8–6	Niemann (3–3)	Bergesen (1–1)	Howell (1)	13,237	14–20
35	May 14	@ Royals	9–5	Guthrie (3–3)	Meche (2–4)		24,431	15–20
36	May 15	@ Royals	8–1	Greinke (7–1)	Eaton (2–4)		38,353	15–21
37	May 16	@ Royals	3–2	Hill (1–0)	Davies (2–2)	Sherrill (7)	26,720	16–21
38	May 17	@ Royals	7–4	Cruz (3–0)	Johnson (2–2)		22,791	16–22
39	May 19	@ Yankees	9–1	Sabathia (4–3)	Bergesen (1–2)		42,838	16–23
40	May 20	@ Yankees	11–4	Hughes (2–2)	Guthrie (3–4)	Rivera (8)	43,903	16–24
41	May 21	@ Yankees	7–4	Aceves (3–0)	Eaton (2–5)	Rivera (9)	43,342	16–25
42	May 22	@ Nationals	4–2 (12)	Báez (3–1)	Wells (0–2)	Sherrill (8)	22,556	17–25
43	May 23	@ Nationals	2–1	Bass (3–1)	Tavárez (1–4)	Sherrill (9)	31,883	18–25
44	May 24	@ Nationals	8–5	Villone (2–0)	Ray (0–1)	Hanrahan (5)	30,880	18–26
45	May 25	Blue Jays	4–1	Guthrie (4–4)	Tallet (2–3)	Sherrill (10)	24,904	19–26
46	May 26	Blue Jays	7–2	Berken (1–0)	Romero (2–1)	Johnson (1)	10,130	20–26
47	May 27	Blue Jays	12–10 (11)	Báez (4–1)	Wolfe (1–1)		13,713	21–26
48	May 28	Tigers	5–1	Hernandez (1–0)	Galarraga (3–5)		11,937	22–26
49	May 29	Tigers	7–2	Bergesen (2–2)	Willis (1–2)		42,704	23–26
50	May 30	Tigers	6–3	Verlander (6–2)	Albers (0–2)	Rodney (9)	34,567	23–27
51	May 31	Tigers	3–0	Jackson (5–3)	Berken (1–1)	Rodney (10)	32,233	23–28

June (12–14)
#	Date	Opponent	Score	Win	Loss	Save	Attendance	Record
52	June 1	@ Mariners	1–0	Hill (2–0)	Washburn (3–4)	Sherrill (11)	16,979	24–28
53	June 2	@ Mariners	8–2	Bédard (4–2)	Hernandez (1–1)		17,978	24–29
54	June 3	@ Mariners	3–2	Aardsma (2–2)	Johnson (2–3)		18,650	24–30
55	June 5	@ Athletics	9–1	Braden (5–5)	Guthrie (4–5)		12,608	24–31
56	June 6	@ Athletics	9–4	Cahill (3–5)	Berken (1–2)		20,267	24–32
57	June 7	@ Athletics	3–0	Mazzaro (2–0)	Hill (2–1)	Bailey (4)	17,208	24–33
58	June 9	Mariners	3–1	Bergesen (3–2)	Vargas (2–1)	Sherrill (12)	17,358	25–33
59	June 10	Mariners	4–1	Hernández (6–3)	Guthrie (4–6)	Aardsma (10)	12,770	25–34
60	June 11	Mariners	6–3	Olson (1–1)	Uehara (2–4)	Aardsma (11)	12,260	25–35
61	June 12	Braves	7–2	Hanson (1–0)	Berken (1–3)		28,469	25–36
62	June 13	Braves	8–4	Bass (4–1)	O'Flaherty (1–1)		29,645	26–36
63	June 14	Braves	11–2	Bergesen (4–2)	Lowe (7–4)		26,770	27–36
64	June 16	Mets	6–4	Pelfrey (5–2)	Guthrie (4–7)	Rodríguez (17)	20,626	27–37
65	June 17	Mets	6–4	Johnson (3–3)	Feliciano (2–2)	Sherrill (13)	31,906	28–37
66	June 18	Mets	5–4	Albers (1–2)	Rodríguez (1–2)		23,009	29–37
67	June 19	@ Phillies	7–2	Hill (3–1)	Bastardo (2–2)		45,135	30–37
68	June 20	@ Phillies	6–5	Hendrickson (2–4)	Madson (2–3)	Sherrill (14)	44,939	31–37
69	June 21	@ Phillies	2–1	Guthrie (5–7)	Hamels (4–3)	Sherrill (15)	45,256	32–37
70	June 23	@ Marlins	8–7 (12)	Badenhop (5–2)	Bass (4–2)		10,222	32–38
71	June 24	@ Marlins	5–2	Nolasco (4–6)	Berken (1–4)	Meyer (1)	12,469	32–39
72	June 25	@ Marlins	11–3	West (3–2)	Hill (3–2)		12,822	32–40
73	June 26	Nationals	11–1	Bergesen (5–2)	Detwiler (0–4)		45,024	33–40
74	June 27	Nationals	6–3	Guthrie (6–7)	Martis (5–3)	Sherrill (16)	39,633	34–40
75	June 28	Nationals	5–3	Lannan (5–5)	Hernandez (1–2)	MacDougal (3)	25,068	34–41
76	June 29	Red Sox	4–0	Lester (7–6)	Berken (1–5)	Papelbon (19)	36,548	34–42
77	June 30	Red Sox	11–10	Hendrickson (3–4)	Saito (2–1)	Sherrill (17)	31,969	35–42

July (9–16)
#	Date	Opponent	Score	Win	Loss	Save	Attendance	Record
78	July 1	Red Sox	6–5 (11)	Ramírez (5–2)	Báez (4–2)	Papelbon (20)	29,391	35–43
79	July 2	@ Angels	5–2	Lackey (3–3)	Guthrie (6–8)	Fuentes (23)	39,180	35–44
80	July 3	@ Angels	6–4	Hernandez (2–2)	Santana (1–4)	Sherrill (18)	39,164	36–44
81	July 4	@ Angels	11–4	Bulger (3–1)	Báez (4–3)		41,764	36–45
82	July 5	@ Angels	9–6	Oliver (3–0)	Albers (1–3)	Fuentes (24)	35,912	36–46
83	July 6	@ Mariners	5–0	Washburn (5–6)	Bergesen (5–3)		24,018	36–47
84	July 7	@ Mariners	12–4	Hendrickson (4–4)	Jakubauskas (5–6)		19,340	37–47
85	July 8	@ Mariners	5–3	Bass (5–2)	Aardsma (2–3)	Sherrill (19)	27,040	38–47
86	July 10	Blue Jays	2–0	Cecil (3–1)	Berken (1–6)	Downs (9)	30,574	38–48
87	July 11	Blue Jays	4–3 (12)	Hendrickson (5–4)	Carlson (1–4)		28,281	39–48
88	July 12	Blue Jays	4–2	Bergesen (6–3)	Rzepczynski (0–1)	Sherrill (20)	21,621	40–48
89	July 17	@ White Sox	12–8	Danks (8–6)	Berken (1–7)		32,013	40–49
90	July 18	@ White Sox	4–3	Buehrle (10–3)	Bergesen (6–4)	Jenks (21)	32,881	40–50
91	July 19	@ White Sox	10–2	Guthrie (7–8)	Contreras (4–8)		32,069	41–50
92	July 20	@ Yankees	2–1	Aceves (6–1)	Johnson (3–4)		46,342	41–51
93	July 21	@ Yankees	6–4	Mitre (1–0)	Hill (3–3)	Rivera (27)	45,589	41–52
94	July 22	@ Yankees	6–4	Burnett (9–4)	Berken (1–8)	Rivera (28)	47,134	41–53
95	July 24	@ Red Sox	3–1	Penny (7–4)	Bergesen (6–5)	Papelbon (25)	38,658	41–54
96	July 25	@ Red Sox	7–2	Lester (9–7)	Guthrie (7–9)		38,063	41–55
97	July 26	@ Red Sox	6–2	Hernandez (3–2)	Smoltz (1–4)		37,606	42–55
98	July 27	Royals	5–3	Tejeda (1–0)	Albers (1–4)	Soria (16)	15,169	42–56
99	July 28	Royals	4–3 (11)	Wright (1–3)	Báez (4–4)	Soria (17)	21,545	42–57
100	July 29	Royals	7–3	Albers (2–4)	Tejeda (1–1)	Johnson (2)	19,741	43–57
101	July 30	Royals	7–3	Bergesen (7–5)	Hochevar (6–4)		19,194	44–57
102	July 31	Red Sox	6–5	Smoltz (2–4)	Guthrie (7–10)	Papelbon (27)	44,091	44–58

August (10–20)
#	Date	Opponent	Score	Win	Loss	Save	Attendance	Record
103	August 1	Red Sox	4–0	Beckett (13–4)	Hernandez (3–3)		49,384	44–59
104	August 2	Red Sox	18–10	Delcarmen (4–2)	Berken (1–9)		43,115	44–60
105	August 3	@ Tigers	6–5	Rodney (2–2)	Báez (4–5)		27,857	44–61
106	August 4	@ Tigers	8–2	Matusz (1–0)	Washburn (8–7)		29,295	45–61
107	August 5	@ Tigers	4–2	Jackson (8–5)	Guthrie (7–11)	Rodney (22)	28,978	45–62
108	August 6	@ Tigers	7–3	Porcello (10–7)	Hernandez (3–4)	Lyon (1)	31,165	45–63
109	August 7	@ Blue Jays	7–5	Berken (2–9)	Romero (10–5)	Johnson (3)	30,795	46–63
110	August 8	@ Blue Jays	3–2 (10)	Frasor (6–2)	Báez (4–6)		28,613	46–64
111	August 9	@ Blue Jays	7–3	Halladay (12–5)	Matusz (1–1)		27,464	46–65
112	August 10	Athletics	9–1	Gonzalez (4–2)	Guthrie (7–12)		14,688	46–66
113	August 11	Athletics	3–2	Hernandez (4–4)	Cahill (6–12)	Johnson (4)	23,006	47–66
114	August 12	Athletics	6–3	Mazzaro (4–8)	Berken (2–10)	Bailey (17)	19,128	47–67
115	August 14	Angels	16–6	Tillman (1–0)	Weaver (12–4)		25,836	48–67
116	August 15	Angels	5–1	Lackey (8–5)	Matusz (1–2)	Fuentes (33)	28,770	48–68
117	August 16	Angels	17–8 (13)	Bulger (6–1)	Bass (5–3)		26,529	48–69
118	August 17	Angels	8–5	Santana (6–6)	Hernandez (4–5)	Fuentes (34)	18,460	48–70
119	August 18	@ Rays	5–4	Price (6–5)	Berken (2–11)	Howell (13)	16,514	48–71
120	August 19	@ Rays	3–1	Niemann (11–5)	Tillman (1–1)	Howell (14)	18,474	48–72
121	August 20	@ Rays	8–7	Matusz (2–2)	Shields (7–10)	Johnson (5)	15,870	49–72
122	August 21	@ White Sox	5–1	Guthrie (8–12)	Floyd (10–8)		34,125	50–72
123	August 22	@ White Sox	4–1	Danks (11–8)	Hernandez (4–6)	Jenks (27)	34,730	50–73
124	August 23	@ White Sox	5–4	Berken (3–11)	Buehrle (11–7)	Johnson (6)	32,742	51–73
125	August 24	@ Twins	2–1	Baker (12–7)	Tillman (1–2)	Nathan (32)	20,271	51–74
126	August 25	@ Twins	7–6	Mijares (2–2)	Mickolio (0–1)		23,696	51–75
127	August 26	@ Twins	5–1	Guthrie (9–12)	Blackburn (8–9)		28,446	52–75
128	August 27	Indians	5–4	Pérez (3–2)	Johnson (3–5)	Wood (17)	13,991	52–76
129	August 28	Indians	13–4	Berken (4–11)	Carmona (3–9)		13,961	53–76
130	August 29	Indians	5–3	Pérez (4–2)	Ray (0–2)	Perez (1)	24,358	53–77
131	August 30	Indians	5–2	Matusz (3–2)	Masterson (4–6)	Johnson (7)	20,643	54–77
132	August 31	Yankees	5–1	Pettitte (12–6)	Guthrie (9–13)	Rivera (37)	25,063	54–78

September (6–20)
#	Date	Opponent	Score	Win	Loss	Save	Attendance	Record
133	September 1	Yankees	9–6	Mitre (1–1)	Ray (0–3)	Rivera (38)	25,782	54–79
134	September 2	Yankees	10–2	Sabathia (16–7)	Mickolio (0–2)	Hughes (2)	21,126	54–80
135	September 4	Rangers	5–1	Feldman (15–4)	Tillman (1–3)	Feliz (2)	15,557	54–81
136	September 5	Rangers	5–4	Matusz (4–2)	Millwood (10–9)	Johnson (8)	18,028	55–81
137	September 6	Rangers	7–0	Guthrie (10–13)	Holland (7–10)		21,599	56–81
138	September 8	@ Red Sox	10–0	Buchholz (5–3)	Hernandez (4–7)		37,647	56–82
139	September 9	@ Red Sox	7–5	Wagner (1–0)	Albers (2–5)	Papelbon (35)	37,712	56–83
140	September 11	@ Yankees	10–4	Tillman (2–3)	Marte (1–2)	Hendrickson (1)	46,771	57–83
141	September 12	@ Yankees	7–3	Matusz (5–2)	Burnett (11–9)		46,497	58–83
142	September 13	@ Yankees	13–3	Sabathia (17–7)	Guthrie (10–14)		46,413	58–84
143	September 14	Rays	8–4	Price (8–7)	Hernandez (4–8)		10,628	58–85
144	September 15	Rays	10–5	Berken (5–11)	Niemann (12–6)		11,575	59–85
145	September 16	Rays	4–2	Johnson (4–5)	Springer (0–4)		10,548	60–85
146	September 17	Rays	3–0	Davis (1–1)	Hendrickson (5–5)		12,436	60–86
147	September 18	Red Sox	3–1	Buchholz (6–3)	Guthrie (10–15)	Papelbon (37)	26,812	60–87
148	September 19	Red Sox	11–5	Lester (14–7)	Albers (2–6)		39,285	60–88
149	September 20	Red Sox	9–3	Matsuzaka (3–5)	Berken (5–12)		27,546	60–89
150	September 21	@ Blue Jays	9–2	Purcey (1–2)	Tillman (2–4)		11,598	60–90
151	September 22	@ Blue Jays	6–5 (11)	Camp (2–6)	Sarfate (0–1)		11,869	60–91
152	September 23	@ Blue Jays	7–3	Richmond (7–10)	Guthrie (10–16)		13,743	60–92
153	September 25	@ Indians	4–2	Carmona (4–12)	Hernandez (4–9)	Wood (20)	33,472	60–93
154	September 26	@ Indians	9–8	Wood (3–3)	Johnson (4–6)		31,749	60–94
155	September 27	@ Indians	9–0	Huff (11–8)	Tillman (2–5)		29,930	60–95
156	September 28	@ Rays	7–6	Cormier (3–3)	Ray (0–4)	Balfour (2)	10,352	60–96
157	September 29	@ Rays	3–1	Davis (2–1)	Guthrie (10–17)	Balfour (3)	10,349	60–97
158	September 30	@ Rays	5–3	Shields (11–12)	Hernandez (4–10)	Springer (1)	10,554	60–98

October (4–0)
#	Date	Opponent	Score	Win	Loss	Save	Attendance	Record
159	October 1	@ Rays	3–2	Waters (1–0)	Garza (8–12)	Johnson (9)	10,716	61–98
160	October 2	Blue Jays	13–7	Berken (6–12)	Purcey (1–3)		16,921	62–98
161	October 3	Blue Jays	6–3	Hendrickson (6–5)	Richmond (8–11)	Johnson (10)	23,254	63–98
162	October 4	Blue Jays	5–4	Albers (3–6)	League (3–6)		17,969	64–98

== Player stats ==
=== Batting ===
Note: G = Games played; AB = At bats; R = Runs scored; H = Hits; 2B = Doubles; 3B = Triples; HR = Home runs; RBI = Runs batted in; AVG = Batting average; SB = Stolen bases

Player	G	AB	R	H	2B	3B	HR	RBI	AVG	SB
Matt Albers	4	1	0	0	0	0	0	0	.000	0
Robert Andino	76	193	30	43	7	0	2	10	.223	3
Michael Aubrey	27	74	8	22	7	0	2	8	.297	0
Danys Báez	3	1	1	1	0	0	0	0	1.000	0
Brian Bass	3	1	0	0	0	0	0	0	.000	0
Brad Bergesen	2	5	1	1	0	0	0	0	.200	0
Jeff Fiorentino	20	49	6	13	1	0	0	5	.265	1
Ryan Freel	9	15	2	2	0	0	0	1	.133	0
Mark Hendrickson	4	0	0	0	0	0	0	0	—	0
Rich Hill	4	8	0	1	0	0	0	1	.125	0
Aubrey Huff	110	430	51	109	24	1	13	72	.253	0
César Izturis	111	374	30	92	11	4	2	29	.246	11
Jim Johnson	5	0	0	0	0	0	0	0	—	0
Adam Jones	119	473	83	131	22	3	19	70	.277	10
Nick Markakis	157	627	89	181	43	2	17	96	.289	5
Chad Moeller	30	89	6	23	8	1	2	10	.258	0
Lou Montañez	25	67	4	12	4	0	1	6	.179	0
Melvin Mora	122	442	43	115	20	0	8	46	.260	3
Félix Pie	101	252	38	67	10	3	9	29	.266	1
Chris Ray	3	0	0	0	0	0	0	0	—	0
Nolan Reimold	104	358	49	100	18	2	15	45	.279	8
Brian Roberts	155	617	107	176	56	1	16	78	.285	29
Guillermo Rodríguez	5	2	0	0	0	0	0	0	.000	0
Oscar Salazar	17	31	4	13	0	0	2	6	.419	0
Luke Scott	127	444	61	116	26	1	25	77	.261	0
George Sherrill	6	0	0	0	0	0	0	0	—	0
Justin Turner	10	14	2	2	0	0	0	1	.143	0
Koji Uehara	2	2	0	0	0	0	0	0	—	0
Jamie Walker	1	0	0	0	0	0	0	0	—	0
Matt Wieters	92	337	33	99	15	1	8	40	.294	0
Ty Wigginton	119	397	41	108	18	0	11	39	.272	1
Gregg Zaun	56	168	23	41	10	0	4	13	.244	0
Team totals	162	5618	741	1508	307	19	160	708	.268	76

=== Pitching ===
Note: W = Wins; L = Losses; ERA = Earned run average; G = Games pitched; GS = Games started; SV = Saves; IP = Innings pitched; R = Runs allowed; ER = Earned runs allowed; BB = Walks allowed; K = Strikeouts

Player	W	L	ERA	G	GS	SV	IP	R	ER	BB	K
Matt Albers	2	6	5.77	54	0	0	64.0	43	41	34	45
Danys Báez	4	6	4.13	57	0	0	69.2	36	32	22	40
Brian Bass	5	3	4.90	48	0	0	86.1	52	47	44	54
Brad Bergesen	7	5	3.43	19	19	0	123.1	52	47	32	65
Jason Berken	5	12	6.51	23	23	0	114.2	88	83	43	65
Alberto Castillo	0	0	2.61	17	0	0	10.1	4	3	4	6
Adam Eaton	2	5	8.56	8	8	0	41.0	39	39	19	28
Jeremy Guthrie	10	17	5.05	32	32	0	192.1	116	108	58	105
Mark Hendrickson	5	5	4.38	52	10	1	98.2	56	48	30	58
Sean Henn	0	0	9.00	6	0	0	3.0	3	3	4	6
David Hernandez	4	10	5.42	20	19	0	101.1	62	61	46	68
Rich Hill	3	3	7.80	14	13	0	57.2	53	50	40	46
Jim Johnson	4	6	4.10	62	0	8	68.0	31	31	23	49
Chris Lambert	0	0	4.76	4	0	0	5.2	3	2	1	7
Radhames Liz	0	0	67.50	2	0	0	1.1	10	10	2	1
Brian Matusz	5	2	4.63	8	8	0	44.2	24	23	14	38
Bob McCrory	0	0	17.18	7	0	0	7.1	19	14	10	4
Cla Meredith	0	0	4.10	27	0	0	26.1	12	12	11	16
Kam Mickolio	0	2	2.63	11	0	0	13.2	4	4	7	14
Chris Ray	0	3	6.65	45	0	0	43.1	33	32	22	39
Dennis Sarfate	0	0	5.85	18	0	0	20.0	15	13	12	17
George Sherrill	0	1	2.40	42	0	20	41.1	11	11	13	39
Alfredo Simón	0	1	9.95	2	2	0	6.1	7	7	2	3
Chris Tillman	2	5	5.40	12	12	0	65.0	40	39	24	39
Koji Uehara	2	4	4.05	12	12	0	66.2	33	30	12	48
Jamie Walker	0	0	5.11	22	0	0	12.1	8	7	0	9
Chris Waters	0	0	8.10	4	0	0	6.2	6	6	2	3
Team totals	64	98	5.15	162	162	31	1429.0	876	817	546	933

== Off-season transactions ==
=== Trades ===
December 10, 2008	To Baltimore Orioles Ryan Freel; 2 minor-league prospects	To Cincinnati Reds Ramón Hernández
January 19, 2009	To Baltimore Orioles Félix Pie	To Chicago Cubs Garrett Olson; Henry Williamson
February 2, 2009	To Baltimore Orioles Rich Hill	To Chicago Cubs Ryan Freel

=== Free agents ===
==== Additions ====
Player	Pos.	Terms	Former team
César Izturis	SS	$5 million, 2 years	St. Louis Cardinals
Gregg Zaun	C	$1.5 million, 1 year	Toronto Blue Jays
Mark Hendrickson	P	$1.5 million, 1 year	Florida Marlins
Koji Uehara	P	$10 million, 2 years	Yomiuri Giants
Ty Wigginton	3B	$6 million, 2 years	Houston Astros

==== Subtractions ====
Player	Position	New team
Daniel Cabrera	P	Washington Nationals
Juan Castro	SS	Los Angeles Dodgers
Alex Cintrón	SS	Washington Nationals
Lance Cormier	P	Tampa Bay Rays
Kevin Millar	1B	Toronto Blue Jays
Jay Payton	OF	

== Farm system ==
Level	Team	League	Manager
AAA	Norfolk Tides	International League	Gary Allenson
AA	Bowie Baysox	Eastern League	Brad Komminsk
A	Frederick Keys	Carolina League	Richie Hebner
A	Delmarva Shorebirds	South Atlantic League	Orlando Gómez
A-Short Season	Aberdeen IronBirds	New York–Penn League	Gary Kendall
Rookie	Bluefield Orioles	Appalachian League	Einar Díaz
Rookie	GCL Orioles	Gulf Coast League	Ramón Sambo
