= Jason Berken =

American baseball player (born 1983)

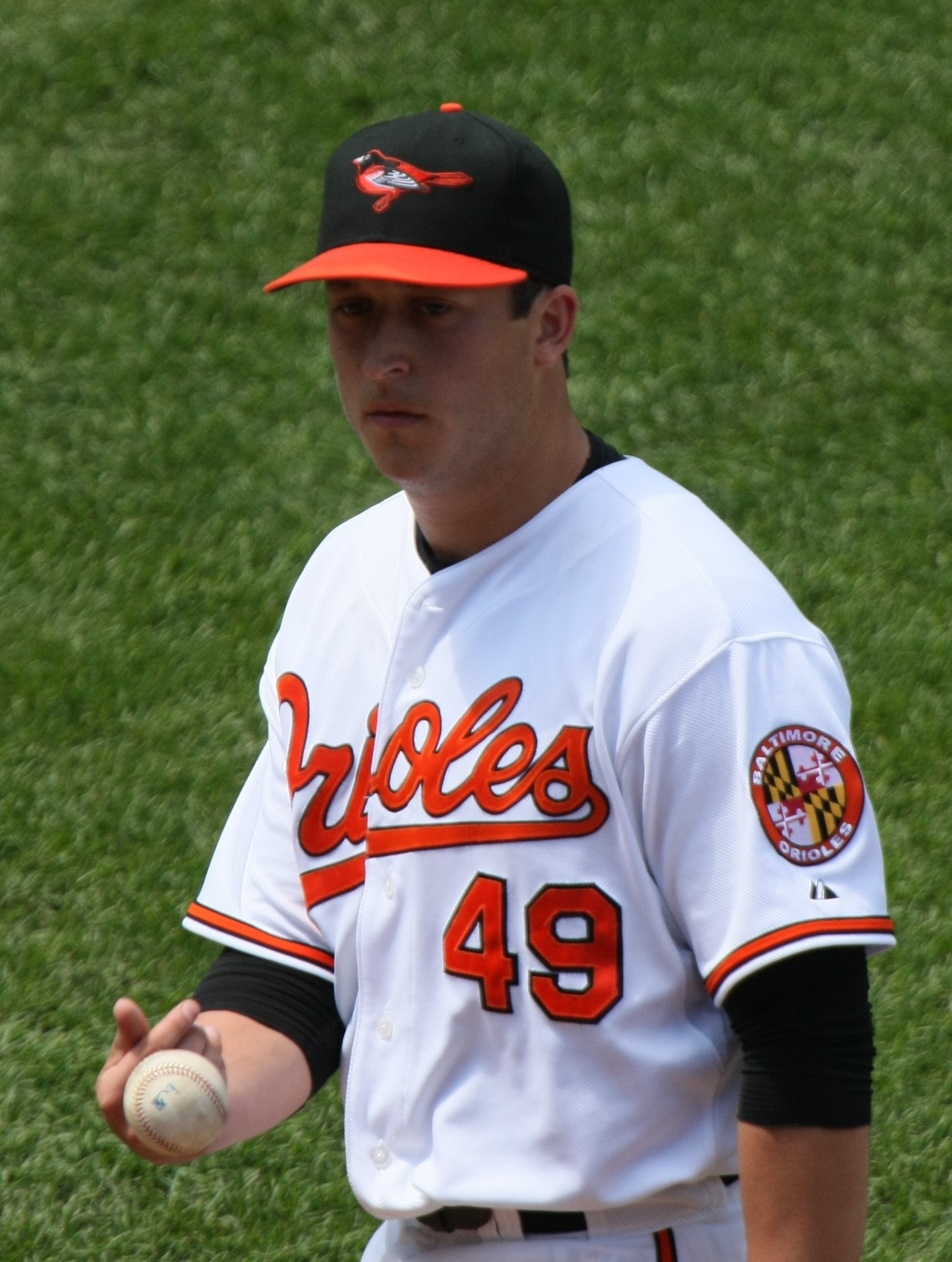
- Berken with the Baltimore Orioles in 2009
- Relief pitcher
- Born: November 27, 1983 (age 41); Green Bay, Wisconsin, U.S.
- Batted: Right Threw: Right

MLB debut
- May 26, 2009, for the Baltimore Orioles

Last MLB appearance
- October 1, 2012, for the Chicago Cubs

MLB statistics
- Win–loss record: 10–20
- Earned run average: 5.36
- Strikeouts: 163
- Stats at Baseball Reference

Teams
- Baltimore Orioles (2009–2012); Chicago Cubs (2012)

Jason Thomas Berken (born November 27, 1983) is an American former professional baseball pitcher. He played in Major League Baseball (MLB) for the Baltimore Orioles and Chicago Cubs.

== College ==
Berken graduated from West De Pere High School. He played college baseball for the Clemson Tigers. While at Clemson, he played for the New England Collegiate Baseball League's Keene Swamp Bats. In 186 2/3 innings with Clemson, Berken pitched to an 18–6 record, 3.04 ERA, and 156 strikeouts.

== Professional career ==
=== Baltimore Orioles ===
Berken was drafted by the Baltimore Orioles in the sixth round (175th overall) of the 2006 MLB draft. On May 26, 2009, after pitching just 25 2/3 innings for Triple-A Norfolk, he was called up to the Orioles' roster to replace injured outfielder Lou Montanez. Berken earned his first major league win that day, giving up two runs in five innings in a 7–2 victory over the Toronto Blue Jays. However, he finished the year with a 6–12 record, along with a 6.54 ERA in 119 2/3 innings pitched. This led to Berken being named the "AL Les Sweetland Award winner" by SI writer Joe Posnanski for finishing the year as the worst starting pitcher in the American League.

Berken made 41 appearances out of the bullpen for Baltimore in 2010, compiling a 3-3 record and 3.03 ERA with 45 strikeouts across 62 1/3 innings pitched. He made 40 relief appearances for the Orioles during the 2011 campaign, registering a 1-2 record and 5.36 ERA with 41 strikeouts over 47 innings of work.

Berken made one appearances for the Orioles during the 2012 season, allowing seven runs (two earned) on six hits in one inning of relief against the Texas Rangers. On September 3, 2012, Berken was designated for assignment by Baltimore following the promotion of Zach Phillips.

=== Chicago Cubs ===
On September 7, 2012, Berken was claimed off waivers by the Chicago Cubs. On September 20, Berken recorded four strikeouts in an inning. In four starts for Chicago, he logged an 0-3 record and 4.82 ERA with 11 strikeouts across 18 2/3 innings pitched. On October 25, Berken was removed from the 40-man roster and sent outright to the Triple-A Iowa Cubs. He was released by the Cubs organization on March 22, 2013.

=== Chicago White Sox ===
On April 2, 2013, Berken signed a minor league contract with the Chicago White Sox organization. He made 27 starts for the Triple-A Charlotte Knights, compiling a 12-12 record and 3.80 ERA with 117 strikeouts over 161 innings of work.

=== San Francisco Giants ===
On November 15, 2013, Berken signed a minor league contract with the San Francisco Giants. Berken made 24 appearances (21 starts) for the Triple-A Fresno Grizzlies during the 2014 season, compiling a 10-9 record and 4.64 ERA with 89 strikeouts over 132 innings of work.

=== Philadelphia Phillies ===
On February 24, 2015, Berken signed a minor league contract with the Philadelphia Phillies. On March 2, he was assigned to the Triple-A Lehigh Valley IronPigs, for whom he logged a 5-8 record and 4.61 ERA with 78 strikeouts and one save over 113 1/3 innings pitched. Berken elected free agency following the season on November 6.

=== Toronto Blue Jays ===
On February 17, 2016, Berken signed a minor league contract with the Toronto Blue Jays organization. In 29 appearances split between the Double–A New Hampshire Fisher Cats and Triple–A Buffalo Bisons, he accumulated a 2–9 record and 4.43 ERA with 63 strikeouts across 105 2/3 innings pitched. Berken elected free agency following the season on November 7.

== See also ==
- List of Major League Baseball single-inning strikeout leaders
