= Kam Mickolio =

American baseball player (born 1984)

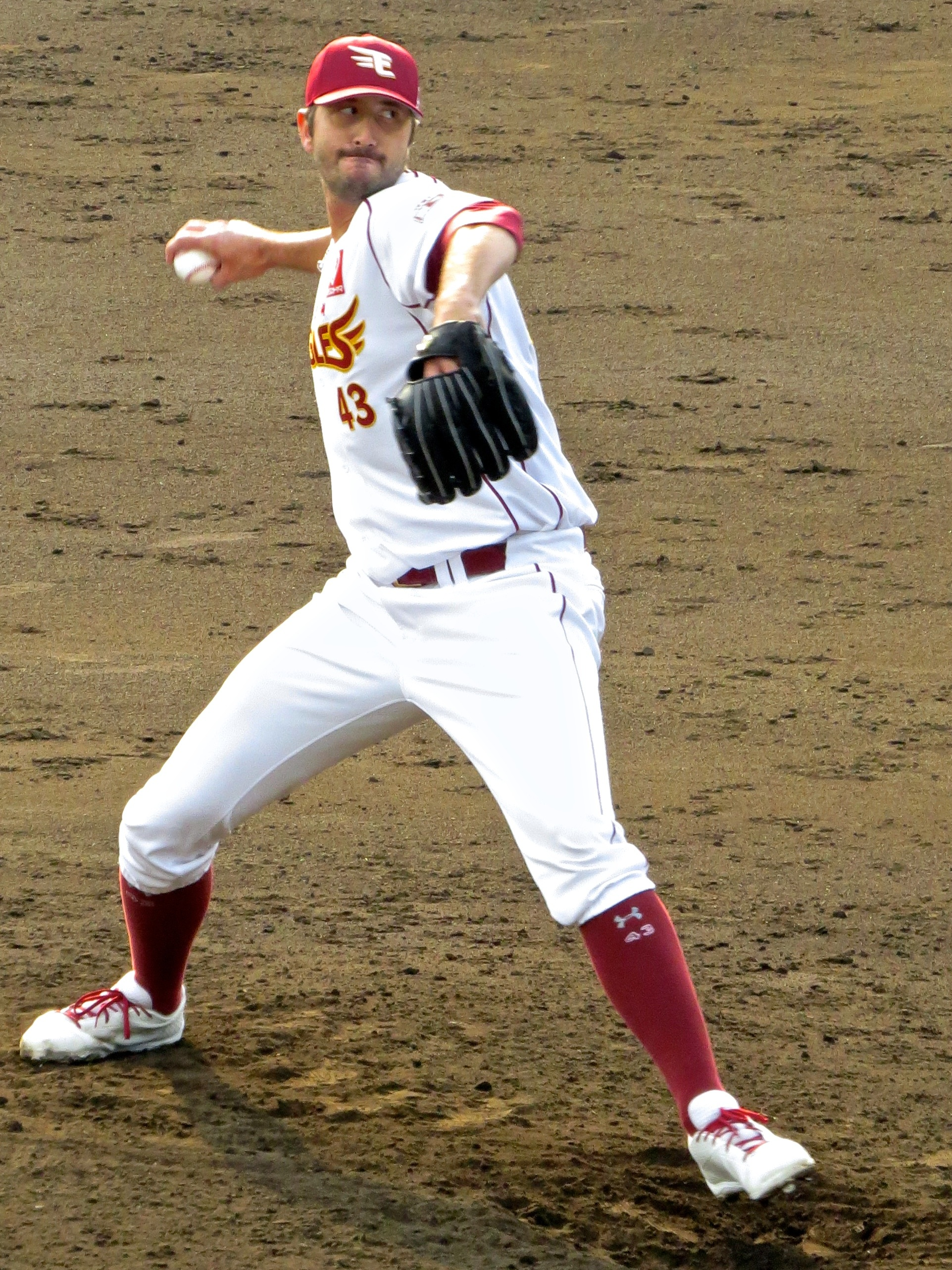
- Mickolio with the Golden Eagles in 2016
- Pitcher
- Born: May 10, 1984 (age 41); Wolf Point, Montana, U.S.
- Batted: Right Threw: Right

Professional debut
- MLB: August 20, 2008, for the Baltimore Orioles
- NPB: April 1, 2012, for the Hiroshima Toyo Carp

Last appearance
- MLB: May 27, 2011, for the Arizona Diamondbacks
- NPB: April 21, 2016, for the Tohoku Rakuten Golden Eagles

MLB statistics
- Win–loss record: 0–3
- Earned run average: 4.83
- Strikeouts: 33

NPB statistics
- Win–loss record: 11–11
- Earned run average: 2.42
- Strikeouts: 151
- Stats at Baseball Reference

Teams
- Baltimore Orioles (2008–2010); Arizona Diamondbacks (2011); Hiroshima Toyo Carp (2012–2014); Tohoku Rakuten Golden Eagles (2015–2016)

Kameron Kraig 'Kam' Mickolio (/mɪkoʊˈlaɪoʊ/ mik-oh-LYE-oh; born May 10, 1984) is an American former professional baseball pitcher. He played in Major League Baseball (MLB) for the Baltimore Orioles and Arizona Diamondbacks, and in Nippon Professional Baseball (NPB) for the Hiroshima Toyo Carp and Tohoku Rakuten Golden Eagles.

== Amateur career ==
Mickolio graduated from Belgrade High School in 2002, but did not play baseball because Montana did not sanction the sport. Instead, he played with a local American Legion Baseball team named the Belgrade Bandits, which finished in third place with a 32–20 record in state competition. He went 9–2 with 115 strikeouts in 88 innings pitched. He registered five shutouts and complete games each in his eleven starts. He also batted .386 with six home runs.

Mickolio attended the College of Eastern Utah for two years. He was the 46th-round pick (1,373rd overall) of the St. Louis Cardinals in the 2003 MLB draft, but did not sign a contract. Mickolio completed his college career at Utah Valley State College.

== Professional career ==
=== Seattle Mariners ===
Mickolio was drafted by the Seattle Mariners in the 18th round, with the 531st overall selection, of the 2006 Major League Baseball draft, and signed with the team five days later on June 11, 2006. Used exclusively out of the bullpen, he compiled a 7–4 record, and progressed through the organization, starting with the Everett AquaSox in 2006. He split the following season with the West Tenn Diamond Jaxx and Tacoma Rainiers.

=== Baltimore Orioles ===
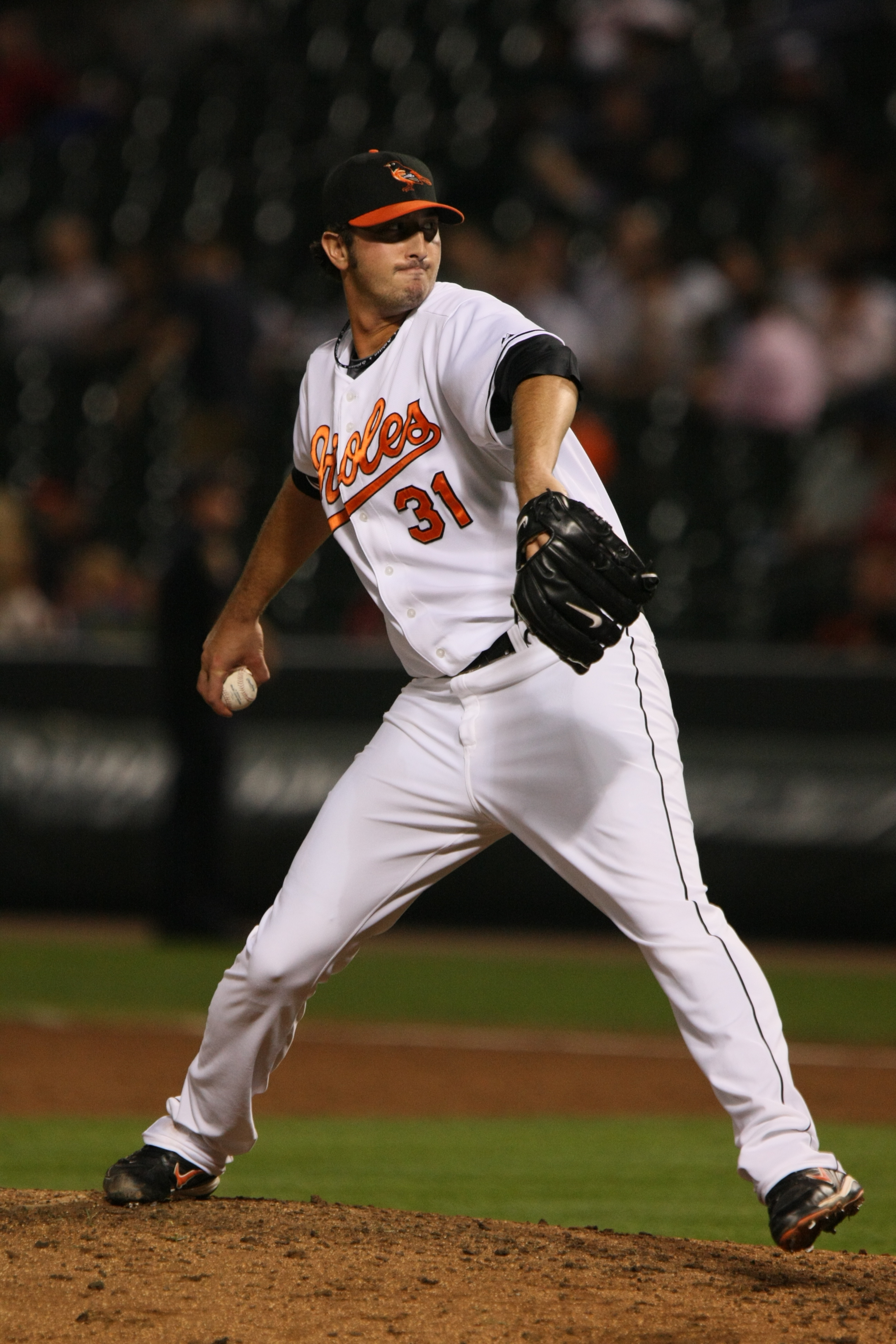
Mickolio pitching for the Baltimore Orioles in 2008

Mickolio was traded by the Mariners along with George Sherrill, Adam Jones, Chris Tillman and Tony Butler to the Baltimore Orioles in exchange for Érik Bédard on February 8, 2008. After spending the first four months of the 2008 campaign with the Bowie Baysox and Norfolk Tides, Mickolio was promoted to the Orioles for the first time to replace an injured Sherrill on August 20. He made his major league debut later that night at Camden Yards, becoming the first player from Utah Valley to play in an MLB game. He pitched the top half of the eighth inning in relief of Dennis Sarfate and surrendered a run in the 11–6 win over the Boston Red Sox. When Brian Burres was recalled to fill a starting rotation vacancy on August 25, Mickolio was optioned to Norfolk, but returned to the Orioles eight days later on September 2. His only decision in nine relief appearances that season was an 8–7 loss to the Toronto Blue Jays at Rogers Centre on September 17, when he allowed a one-out Travis Snider sacrifice fly to left field to score Scott Rolen in the bottom of the eighth to break a 7–7 deadlock.

Pitching for the Tides in the first half of 2009, Mickolio was recalled by the Orioles on July 6 after biceps tendinitis forced Chris Ray onto the disabled list. He bounced back and forth between Norfolk and Baltimore twice within the next six weeks, getting his final promotion of the year on August 17 to replace Matt Albers who was sent to the Tides. Mickolio was credited with a pair of losses before inflammation in his throwing shoulder ended his season on September 17.

=== Arizona Diamondbacks ===
On December 6, 2010, Mickolio and David Hernandez were traded to the Arizona Diamondbacks for third baseman Mark Reynolds.

On May 28, 2011, Mickolio was optioned to the Triple-A Reno Aces after Zach Duke was activated from the disabled list. He was released by the Diamondbacks organization on November 9.

=== Hiroshima Toyo Carp ===
Mickolio's contract was sold to the Hiroshima Toyo Carp in Japan on November 14, 2011, and he was the team's closer for three seasons. In 61 appearances (40 games finished) in 2012, Mickolio was 3–5 with a 2.79 ERA and 21 saves, striking out 54 in 58 innings. On December 6, 2012, he re-signed with Hiroshima for 75.6 million yen (US$740,000). In 57 appearances (45 games finished) in 2013, he was 2–4 with a 2.04 ERA and 27 saves, striking out 39 in 57.1 innings. In his third season with the Carp in 2014, Mickolio appeared in 51 games, posting a 1–1 record with 25 saves and a 2.45 ERA.

=== Tohoku Rakuten Golden Eagles ===
Mickolio left the Carp after the 2014 season and signed a two-year deal with the Tohoku Rakuten Golden Eagles worth an estimated 481 million yen and was assigned the number 43. He was unable to pitch in 2015 due to injury. Finally healthy in 2016, Mickolio made 45 relief appearances for the Eagles. He compiled a 5–1 record and a 2.38 ERA.

=== Minnesota Twins ===
After his stint with the Golden Eagles, Mickolio was signed by the Minnesota Twins to a minor league deal on May 16, 2017. In seven appearances for the Triple–A Rochester Red Wings, he logged a 4.00 ERA with three strikeouts across 9 innings pitched. Mickolio elected free agency following the season on November 6.

=== Long Island Ducks ===
On April 23, 2019, Mickolio signed with the Long Island Ducks of the Atlantic League of Professional Baseball.

On May 19, 2019, Mickolio announced his retirement from professional baseball.

== Personal life ==
On November 12, 2011, Mickolio married the former Tiffany Leone. The couple has three children, a son, Braden Landon Mickolio, born in August 2012; a daughter, Abriella Emilia Mickolio, born in May 2014; and a daughter, Lincoln Perry Mickolio, born in May 2015. Tiffany and their three children had planned on joining Kameron in Japan in July 2016.
