= George Sherrill =

American baseball player (born 1977)

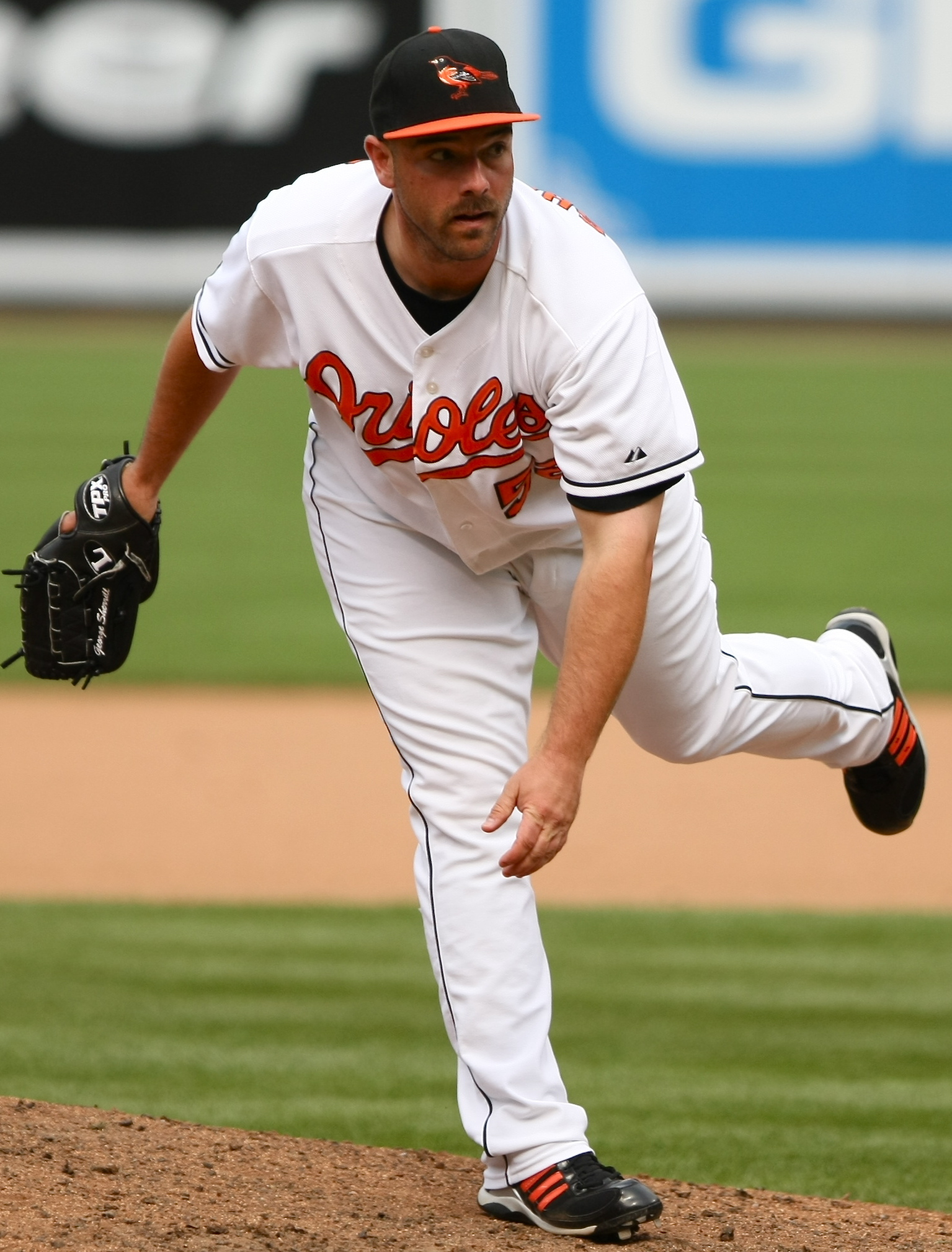
- Sherrill with the Baltimore Orioles
- Pitcher
- Born: April 19, 1977 (age 48); Memphis, Tennessee, U.S.
- Batted: Left Threw: Left

MLB debut
- July 16, 2004, for the Seattle Mariners

Last MLB appearance
- April 9, 2012, for the Seattle Mariners

MLB statistics
- Win–loss record: 19–17
- Earned run average: 3.77
- Strikeouts: 320
- Saves: 56
- Stats at Baseball Reference

Teams
- Seattle Mariners (2004–2007); Baltimore Orioles (2008–2009); Los Angeles Dodgers (2009–2010); Atlanta Braves (2011); Seattle Mariners (2012)

Career highlights and awards
- All-Star (2008)

George Friederich Sherrill (born April 19, 1977) is an American former professional baseball relief pitcher. Sherrill pitched in Major League Baseball (MLB) for the Seattle Mariners, Baltimore Orioles, Los Angeles Dodgers, and Atlanta Braves from 2004 through 2012. He was an MLB All-Star in 2008.

== Career ==
=== Amateur and independent baseball ===
Sherrill attended Evangelical Christian School in Memphis, Tennessee, graduating in 1995. He enrolled at Jackson State Community College, playing for the school's baseball team in 1996 and 1997. In 1997, Sherrill played summer league baseball for the Kenosha Kroakers of the Northwoods League.

After his sophomore year, he transferred to Austin Peay State University. For the Austin Peay Governors baseball team, Sherrill served as closing pitcher in 1998, then as a starting pitcher in 1999.

Sherrill began his professional career pitching for the Evansville Otters in the Frontier League, an independent baseball league. In 22 games pitched, he had a 2–4 win–loss record with a 3.15 earned run average (ERA). He played for Evansville in 1999 and 2000. He moved to the Northern League in 2001 and pitched for the Sioux Falls Canaries. In 2002 and 2003, he played for the Winnipeg Goldeyes of the Northern League.

=== Seattle Mariners ===
In July 2003, the Seattle Mariners purchased Sherrill's rights from Winnipeg for $3,000, and signed Sherrill to a minor league contract with a signing bonus of $2,500. They assigned him to the San Antonio Missions of the Class AA Texas League, and was selected as a Seattle representative for the Arizona Fall League.

In 2004, Sherrill started the season with the Tacoma Rainiers of the Class AAA Pacific Coast League (PCL), making the Triple-A All-Star team. However, he did not play in the All-Star game since he was being promoted to the Mariners. Sherrill made his MLB debut on July 16, 2004, against the Cleveland Indians, pitching one inning of relief and allowing two earned runs. He split 2005 between Tacoma and Seattle, and joined the Mariners full-time in 2006.

In 2007, Sherrill posted career numbers, finishing with a 2–0 record and a 2.36 ERA in 73 appearances. With the 2006 injury of Mark Lowe, and the trade of Rafael Soriano during the offseason, Sherrill became the primary setup man for Mariners closer J. J. Putz.

=== Baltimore Orioles ===
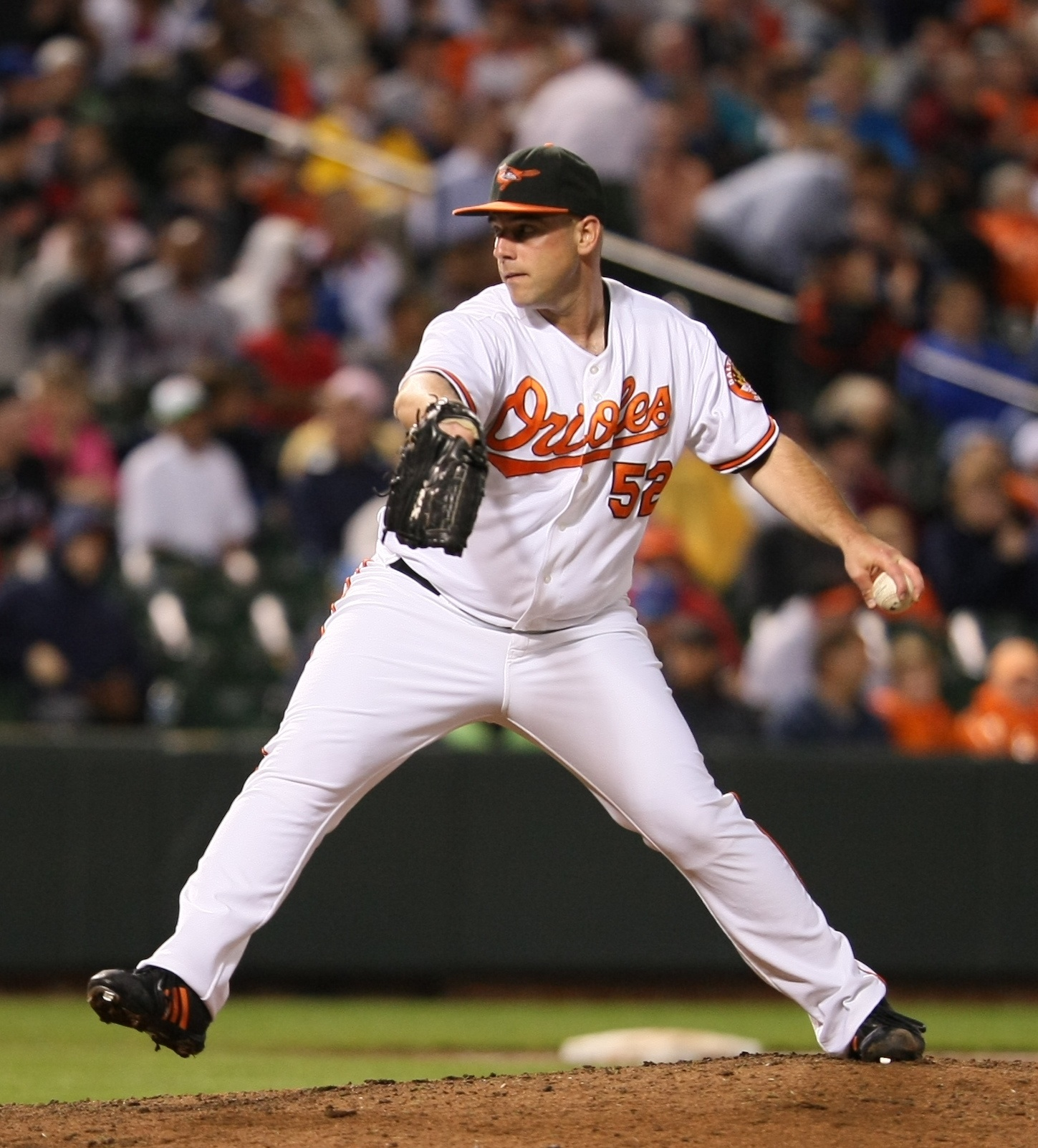
Sherrill in 2009

On February 8, 2008, Sherrill was traded to the Baltimore Orioles along with Adam Jones and minor league pitchers Kam Mickolio, Chris Tillman, and Tony Butler, for Orioles left-hander Érik Bédard. On March 18, Sherrill was named the closer for the Orioles.

On July 6, 2008, Sherrill was selected to represent the American League in the All-Star Game. In his only All-Star Game appearance, Sherrill struck out two batters and gave up one hit over 2 1/3 innings. He pitched part of the 12th, and all of the 13th and 14th innings in the record-setting 15 inning game.

Sherrill signed a one-year, $2.75 million contract with the Orioles for the 2009 season. He had a 2.40 ERA in 42 appearances for the Orioles, including 20 saves over the first half of 2009.

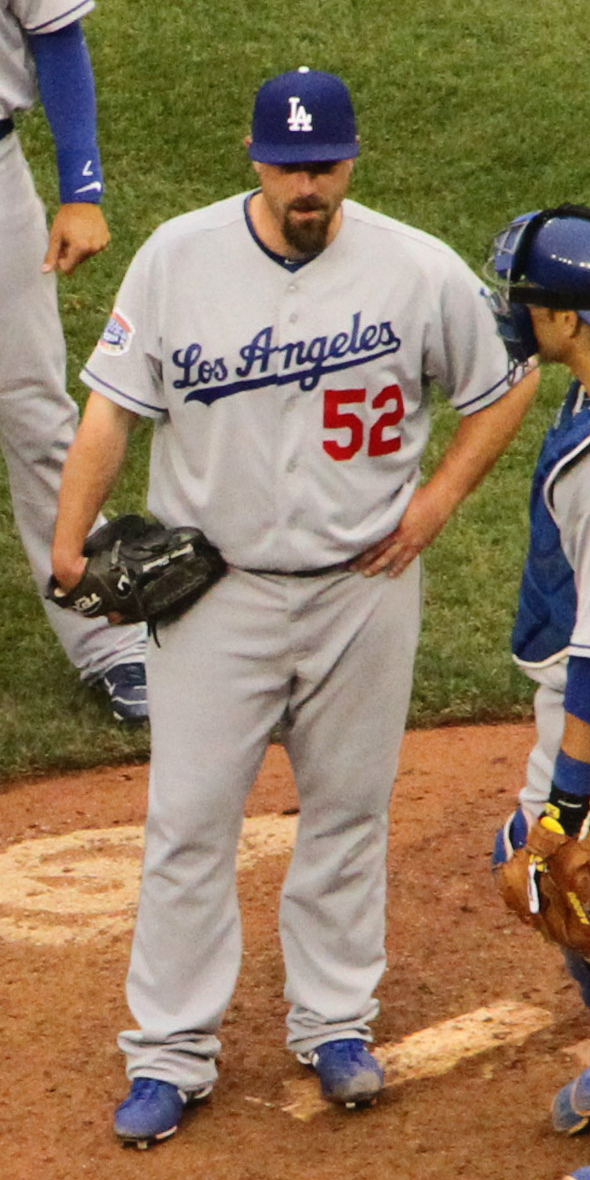
Sherrill with the Los Angeles Dodgers

=== Los Angeles Dodgers ===
On July 30, 2009, Sherrill was traded to the Los Angeles Dodgers for two prospects, third baseman Josh Bell and pitcher Steve Johnson. The next night, Sherrill struck out the side against the Atlanta Braves in his debut. He appeared in 30 games for the Dodgers, finishing with an 0.65 ERA and 22 strikeouts.

Sherrill struggled in 2010 to the point where he was once put on outright waivers, though he refused a minor league assignment and remained on the Dodgers' roster the full season. He appeared in 65 games with the Dodgers in 2010 with a 6.69 ERA, the highest total in his major league career. On August 10, Sherrill had the first plate appearance of his career. Sherrill, who did not bat in college and never took batting practice until being traded to the Dodgers, drew a walk from J. C. Romero without taking the bat off his shoulder. On December 2, 2010, the Dodgers chose not to offer him a new contract, and he became a free agent.

=== Atlanta Braves ===
On December 8, 2010, Sherrill signed a one-year contract with the Atlanta Braves for $1.2 million. During the regular season, Sherrill made 51 appearances out of the Braves' bullpen, totaling 36 innings pitched. He had a 3–1 record with a 3.00 ERA.

=== Seattle Mariners (second stint) ===
On December 17, 2011, Sherrill agreed to a one-year contract worth $1.1 million to return to the Mariners. The deal became official on December 30. After appearing in two games and giving up four runs, on Sherrill was placed on the 15-day disabled list with a strained flexor bundle in his left elbow. After undergoing Tommy John surgery, Sherrill missed the remainder of the 2012 season.

=== Kansas City Royals ===
On December 11, 2012, the Kansas City Royals signed Sherrill to a minor league contract. He pitched for the Omaha Storm Chasers of the PCL but was released on June 28, 2013. In 21 appearances, he was 0–1 with a 6.23 ERA and 30 strikeouts.

== Signature style ==
Sherrill was noted for wearing his hat flat-billed as a statement of independence (his teammates in the minor leagues used to joke that he did not even know how to bend the brim of his hat like a proper professional).

During the 2008 season, some of Sherrill's Baltimore teammates would flip up the brims of their hats every time he successfully closed out a game. Orioles fans nicknamed this move the Flat Breezy, and the Orioles television announcers would sometimes announce an Orioles win after a Sherrill save as "flat breezy time." In a MASN post-game interview, Sherrill credited former Orioles first baseman Kevin Millar, a noted prankster, as the originator of this gesture. Sherrill also acquired the nickname of the "Brim Reaper" from Millar, which Sherrill carried over after his trade to the Dodgers and eventually trademarked in 2009 (although it was abandoned as of February 2010).
