= Érik Bédard =

Canadian baseball player (born 1979)

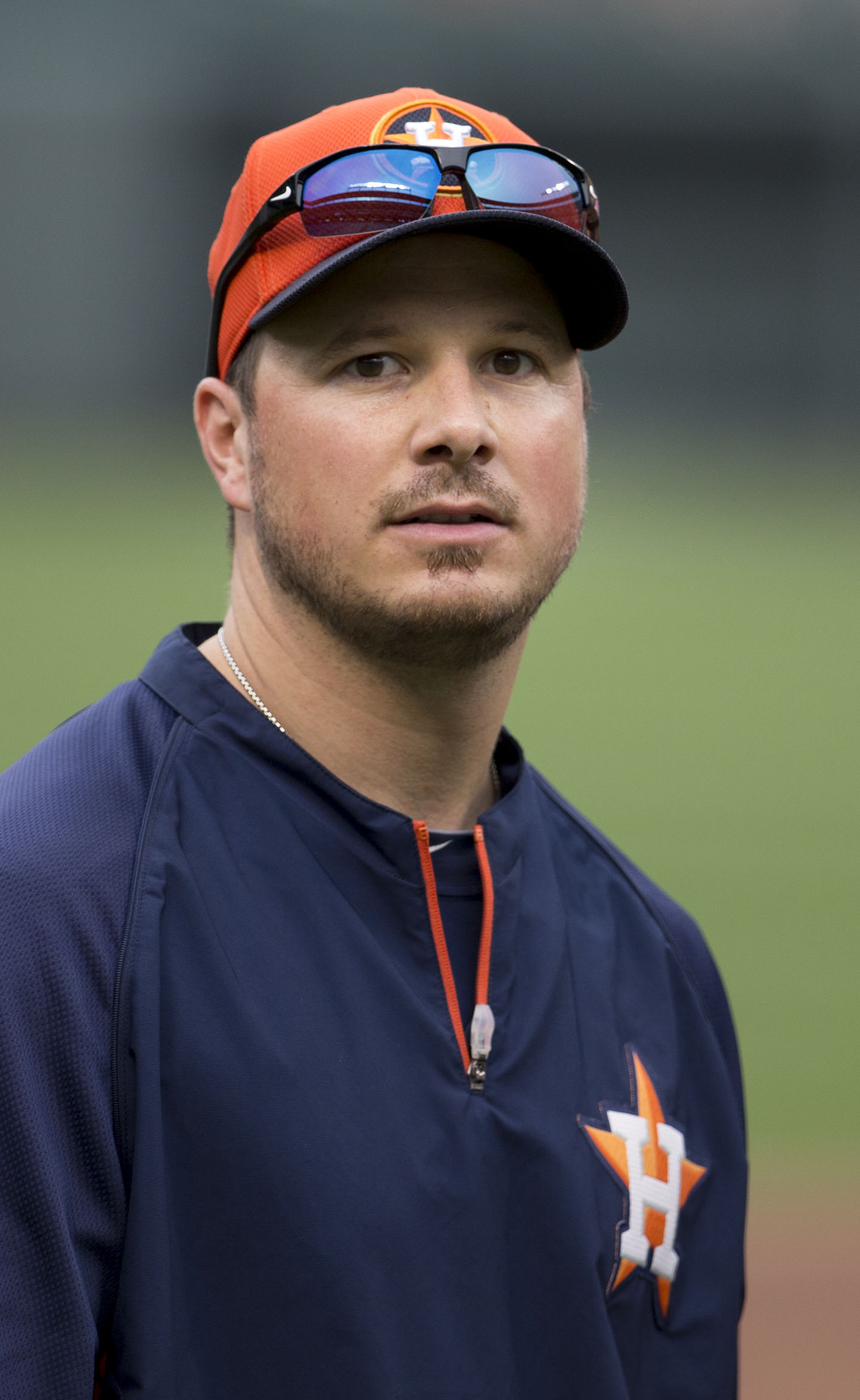
- Bedard with the Houston Astros
- Pitcher
- Born: March 5, 1979 (age 47); Navan, Ontario, Canada
- Batted: Left Threw: Left

MLB debut
- April 17, 2002, for the Baltimore Orioles

Last MLB appearance
- July 12, 2014, for the Tampa Bay Rays

MLB statistics
- Win–loss record: 71–82
- Earned run average: 3.99
- Strikeouts: 1,246
- Stats at Baseball Reference

Teams
- Baltimore Orioles (2002, 2004–2007); Seattle Mariners (2008–2009, 2011); Boston Red Sox (2011); Pittsburgh Pirates (2012); Houston Astros (2013); Tampa Bay Rays (2014)

Member of the Canadian

Baseball Hall of Fame
- Induction: 2025

Érik Joseph Bédard (pronounced [eʁik beˈdɑʁ] baydar; born March 5, 1979) is a Canadian former professional baseball pitcher. He pitched in Major League Baseball (MLB) for the Baltimore Orioles, Seattle Mariners, Boston Red Sox, Pittsburgh Pirates, Houston Astros, and Tampa Bay Rays. Bédard was the staff ace with Baltimore in 2007, setting the franchise single-season strikeouts per nine innings record and record for strikeouts since relocating to Baltimore. He was traded after that season to the Mariners for a package that included future All-Stars Adam Jones and George Sherrill. After several injury-filled seasons, Seattle traded him to Boston in 2011.

== Early years ==
Bédard was born on March 5, 1979, in Navan, Ontario, a suburb of Ottawa. A Franco-Ontarian, Bédard began his baseball career in the Orleans Little League and the Ontario Baseball Association. He was a pitcher on the 1992 Orleans Junior Red Sox team which defeated Glace Bay in the 1992 Canadian Championship. Bédard did not play high school baseball, which is common in Canada due to the short playing season.

Although 5 ft 4 in (1.63 m) and 120 pounds (54 kg) as a senior, he grew seven inches and gained 30 pounds (14 kg) during the summer between graduating from high school and beginning college. He accompanied a friend to a tryout at Norwalk Community College in Norwalk, Connecticut, and made the baseball team as a walk-on.

While in college, he added 10 miles per hour to his fastball, gained another 30 pounds (14 kg), took the "lowest level" non-credit English language course to enhance his knowledge of the language, and became a junior college All-American.

== Professional career ==
=== Baltimore Orioles ===
As a left-handed starter, Bédard was drafted by the Baltimore Orioles in the sixth round of the 1999 Major League Baseball draft. He made his professional debut with the Gulf Coast Orioles, where he allowed only one earned run in 20.1 innings for an 0.44 ERA, 4th best among all minor league pitchers that year. He spent the 2000 season with the Delmarva Shorebirds of the South Atlantic League, where he was 9–4 with a 3.57 ERA in 29 games (22 starts). In 2001 with the Frederick Keys of the Carolina League, he led all Orioles farmhands with a 2.15 ERA and compiled a 9–2 record in 17 starts. He was selected for the All-Star Futures Game in 2001 and 2002.

Bédard made his MLB debut on April 17, 2002, for the Orioles against the New York Yankees. He entered the game in the bottom of the eighth and allowed a single to the first batter he faced, Jason Giambi, before retiring Jorge Posada on a pop fly and striking out Robin Ventura swinging before he was replaced by another reliever. Bédard next pitched on April 21 against the Tampa Bay Devil Rays and allowed an RBI single to the only batter he faced, Ben Grieve. Bédard was optioned to the Double-A Bowie Baysox two days later and pitched in 13 games for them, including 12 starts, with a 6–3 record and a 1.97 ERA. He was named the Eastern League's best pitching prospect by Baseball America. However, he left his start on June 26 with pain in his left elbow and underwent Tommy John surgery on September 10.

Bédard spent most of the 2003 season on the disabled list rehabbing his elbow and returned to make only six short starts in the minors late in the season. He received an invitation to major league spring training the next year and made the most of his opportunity, beating out other pitchers for the fifth spot in the starting rotation. In 2004, he posted a 4.59 ERA in 137 1/3 innings of work. He struck out 7.93 batters per nine innings, and he allowed 71 walks. He often had a high pitch count, exceeding 100 pitches 17 times while topping out at 7 innings pitched. Working with pitching coach Ray Miller, who rejoined the Orioles during the 2004 season, Bédard improved his changeup, his third pitch to go along with his 91–93 mph fastball and curveball.

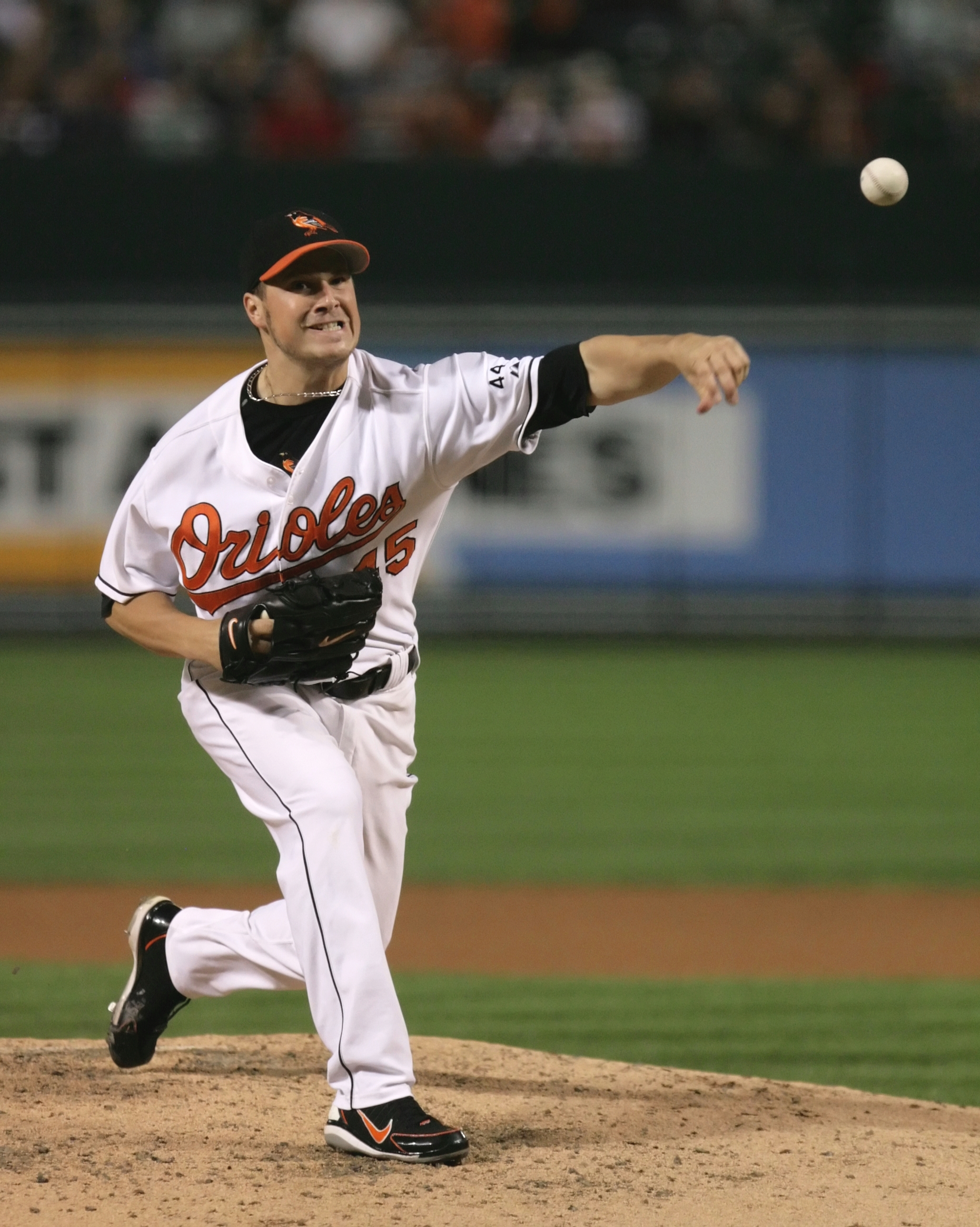
Bédard pitching for the Baltimore Orioles in 2006

In the beginning of 2005, he posted a 2.08 ERA, but after a sprained knee sidelined him for two months, he posted a 5.44 ERA. He had one of his best statistical years in 2006, going 15–11 in 33 starts and posting a 3.76 ERA and 1.35 WHIP. He also pitched a total of 196 1/3 innings, his career high.

Bédard was named the Orioles' 2007 Opening Day starting pitcher. On May 20, he recorded his first major league hit as a batter, a single up the middle in the 5th against the Washington Nationals. In his next at-bat, he looped an RBI single over shortstop, going 2-for-2 with a sacrifice in the game. On July 7, Bédard struck out 15 Texas Rangers, matching the Orioles franchise record set by Mike Mussina. In the same game, he faced the minimum number of batters (27), as the only two batters who reached base were later out on double plays. His 15 strikeouts also set the record for the most in a game by a Canadian. He earned him the American League (AL) Pitcher of the Month Award for July.

Although he played for a losing team, Bédard's individual performance put him among those shortlisted to contend for the AL Cy Young Award. Then-teammate Kevin Millar stated that Bédard "probably has the best curveball in baseball." Bédard broke the Baltimore single-season strikeout record on August 26, breaking Mussina's record of 218 in 1997.

The results of an MRI on September 4 confirmed that Bédard suffered a strained oblique in his previous start on August 26. Because the Orioles were eliminated from playoff contention later that week, the team decided to shut down Bédard for the remainder of the season on September 9, ending his season by placing him on the 60-day disabled list.

Bédard finished the season with a 13–5 record, posting a 3.16 ERA with 221 strikeouts. He finished fifth in Cy Young voting. He was eligible for arbitration from the Orioles during the 2007–2008 offseason.

=== Seattle Mariners ===
On February 8, 2008, the Orioles traded Bédard to the Seattle Mariners for outfielder Adam Jones and pitchers George Sherrill, Tony Butler, Chris Tillman and Kam Mickolio. On February 13, Mariners manager John McLaren announced that he would be their Opening Day starter. Bédard then signed a one-year, $7 million deal with the Mariners on February 15, avoiding salary arbitration. He was 6–4 with a 3.67 ERA in 15 starts for the Mariners in 2008 but on July 10, he was placed on the 15-day disabled list with stiffness in his left shoulder. He missed the rest of the season and underwent arthroscopic surgery on the shoulder on September 26.

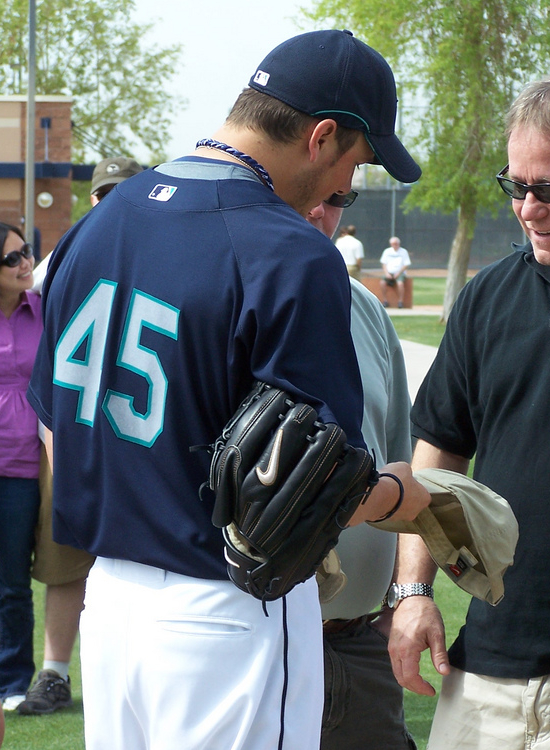
Bédard signing autographs in 2009 spring training

Bédard only played the first four months of the 2009 season before landing on the disabled list again due to a torn labrum in his pitching shoulder. He finished with a 5–3 record and a 2.82 ERA.

On February 6, 2010, Bédard re-signed with the Mariners to a one-year contract with a mutual option for 2011. At the start of the 2010 season, there was hope he would return to the majors as soon as May or June 2010. However, he suffered multiple setbacks while rehabbing his shoulder and did not pitch in the majors in 2010, though he did appear in three minor league rehab games. He was scheduled to pitch for the Mariners on July 6 but was scratched due to shoulder discomfort.

After the 2010 season, the Mariners declined their 2011 option on Bédard's contract and re-signed him to an incentive laden non-guaranteed contract. He had a 1.39 ERA in May. He appeared in 16 games for the Mariners to start the 2011 season, with a 4–7 record and a 3.45 ERA.

=== Boston Red Sox ===
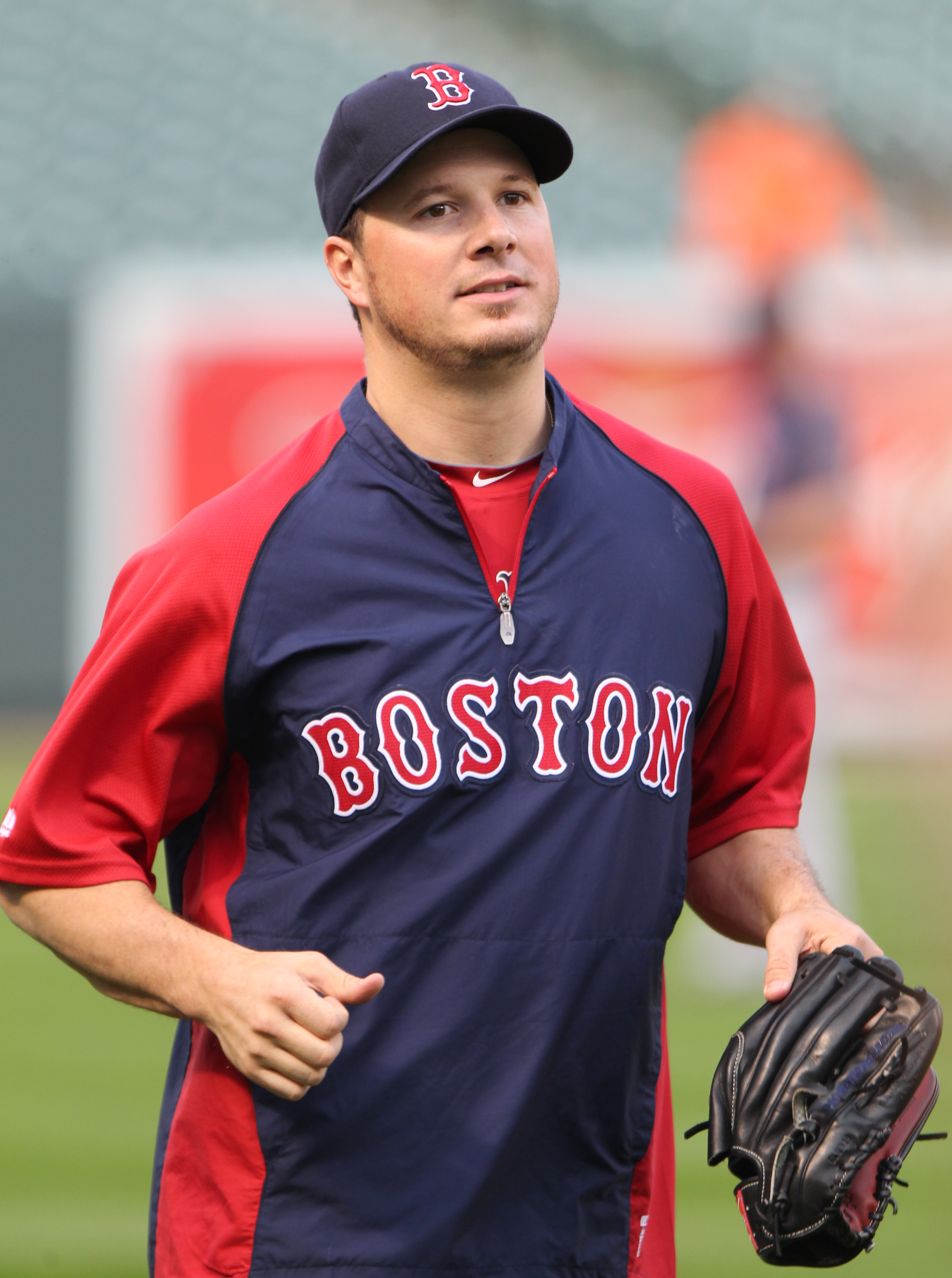
Bédard with the Boston Red Sox in 2011

On July 31, 2011, Bédard and minor league pitcher Josh Fields were traded to the Boston Red Sox for minor league outfielders Trayvon Robinson and Chih-Hsien Chiang as part of a three team deal that also involved minor leaguers Tim Federowicz, Stephen Fife, and Juan Rodriguez going to the Los Angeles Dodgers.

Bedard made eight starts for the Red Sox in August and September. He never exceeded six innings and had a 1–2 record and 4.03 ERA.

=== Pittsburgh Pirates ===
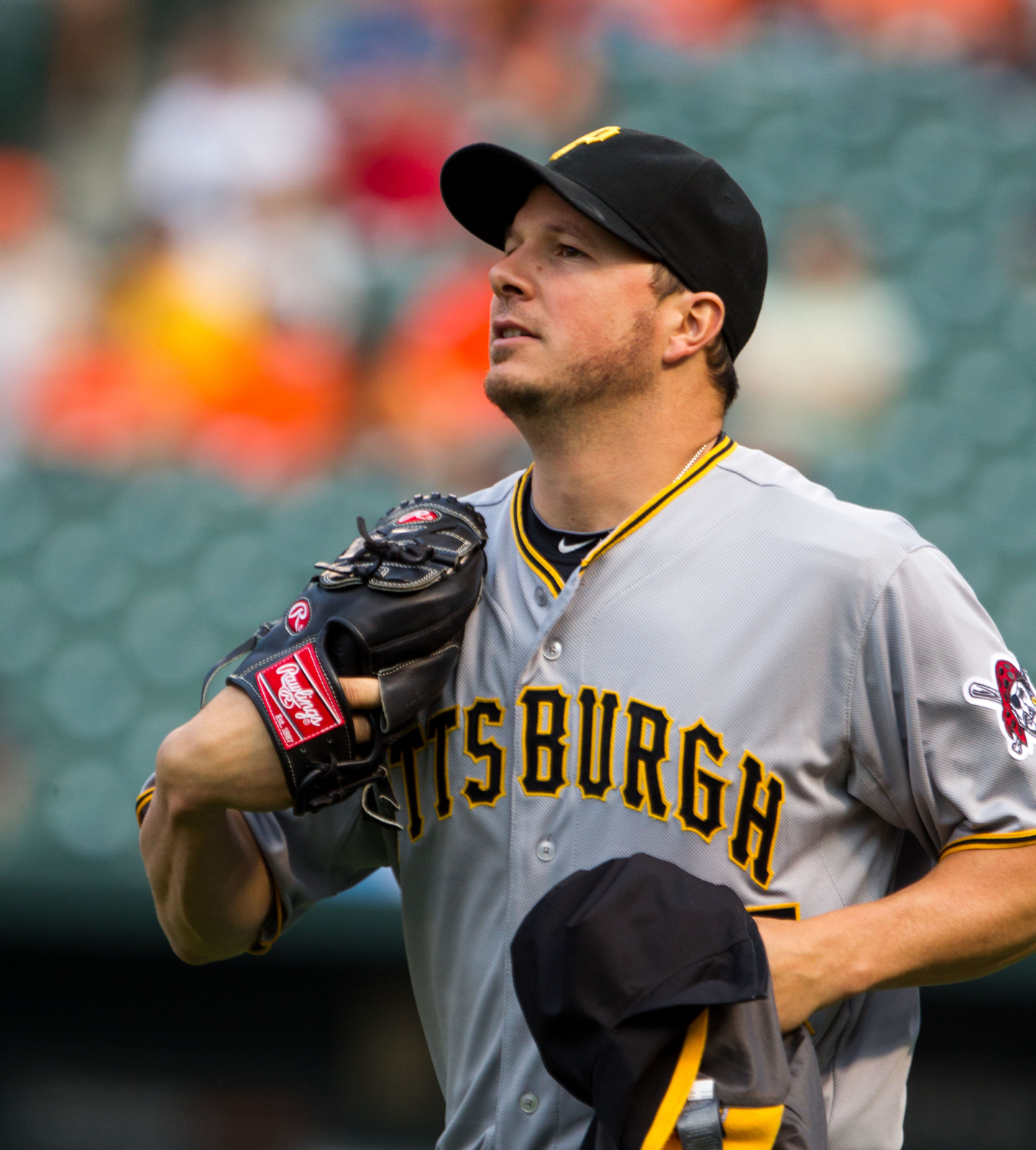
Bédard with the Pittsburgh Pirates

On December 7, 2011, the Pittsburgh Pirates signed Bédard to a one-year, $4.5 million contract. He was their 2012 Opening Day Starter.

Bedard went 7–14 with a 5.02 ERA in 24 starts and was released on August 28.

=== Houston Astros ===
The Houston Astros signed Bédard to a minor-league deal on January 21, 2013. He recorded his first career save on opening day, March 31, with 3 1/3 innings of relief against rival Texas Rangers. On July 21, he pitched 6 1/3 innings of a no hitter when he asked to leave his no-hitter after 109 pitches. In 32 appearances (26 starts) for the Astros, he was 4–12 with a 4.59 ERA.

=== Tampa Bay Rays ===
On February 17, 2014, Bédard signed a minor league contract with the Tampa Bay Rays. He was released by the Rays on March 25 and became a free agent, exercising an "opt-out" clause in his contract after not making the starting rotation at the end of spring training. A few days later, Bédard changed his mind and agreed to report to the Durham Bulls, the Triple-A minor league affiliate of the Rays.

On April 11, the Rays announced that Bédard had been called up from Durham to the majors. He pitched for the Rays until he was designated for assignment on July 28. Bédard was released on August 3. In 17 appearances (15 starts), he was 4–6 with a 4.76 ERA.

=== Los Angeles Dodgers ===
On January 18, 2015, Bédard signed a minor league contract with the Los Angeles Dodgers. On March 23, the Dodgers announced that Bédard would miss four to six weeks after he strained his back during a spring training game, ending any chance he had to make the opening day roster. After spending the start of the season in extended spring training rehabilitating his injury Bédard was assigned to the Class-A Rancho Cucamonga Quakes on May 25. He made three starts for the Quakes with a 1–1 record and 5.02 ERA before announcing his retirement on June 11.

== International career ==
Bédard pitched for Canada “In that appearance, he allowed no runs but gave up two walks and two hits while striking out six batters in Canada’s first game, a win over South Africa.”.

Bédard was inducted into the Canadian Baseball Hall of Fame in 2025. He did not attend his induction ceremony.

“In that appearance, he allowed no runs but gave up two walks and two hits while striking out six batters in Canada’s first game, a win over South Africa.”

== See also ==
- List of Major League Baseball players from Canada

Preceded by J. J. Putz	American League Pitcher of the Month; July 2007	Succeeded by Andy Pettitte
Preceded by Johan Santana	AL hits per nine innings leader 2008	Succeeded by Daisuke Matsuzaka
