= David Hernandez (baseball) =

American baseball player (born 1985)

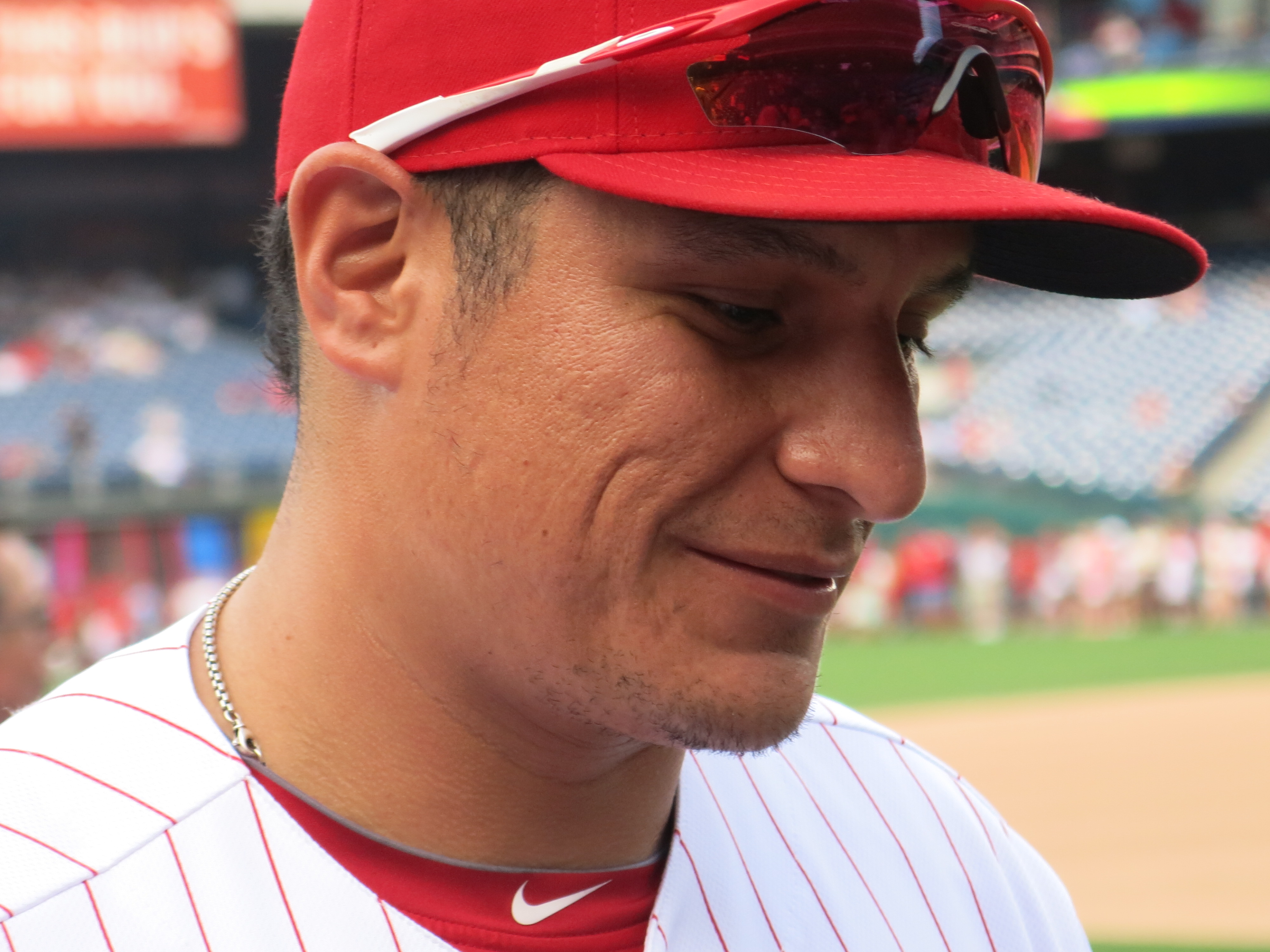
- Hernandez with the Phillies in 2016
- Pitcher
- Born: May 13, 1985 (age 41); Sacramento, California, U.S.
- Batted: Right Threw: Right

MLB debut
- May 28, 2009, for the Baltimore Orioles

Last MLB appearance
- August 8, 2019, for the Cincinnati Reds

MLB statistics
- Win–loss record: 38–47
- Earned run average: 4.12
- Strikeouts: 664
- Stats at Baseball Reference

Teams
- Baltimore Orioles (2009–2010); Arizona Diamondbacks (2011–2013, 2015); Philadelphia Phillies (2016); Los Angeles Angels (2017); Arizona Diamondbacks (2017); Cincinnati Reds (2018–2019)

David Jose Hernandez (born May 13, 1985) is an American former professional baseball relief pitcher. He played in Major League Baseball (MLB) for the Baltimore Orioles, Philadelphia Phillies, Atlanta Braves, Los Angeles Angels, Arizona Diamondbacks, and Cincinnati Reds. He attended Cosumnes River College.

== Professional career ==
=== Baltimore Orioles ===
Hernandez, who is of Mexican-American descent, was drafted by the Baltimore Orioles in the 16th round (483rd overall pick) of the 2005 MLB draft. Hernandez made his MLB debut against the Detroit Tigers on May 28, 2009. He went 5 2/3 innings. He gave up five hits, allowed four walks, and one earned run while striking out three. He'd remain in the Baltimore rotation for the remainder of the season, starting 19 games and finishing with a record of 4–10 with a 5.42 ERA. In 101 1/3 innings, he struck out 68. The following season he split time between the rotation and the bullpen for the O's, finishing 8–8 in 41 games, 8 of them starts. In 79 1/3 innings, he struck out 72.

=== Arizona Diamondbacks ===
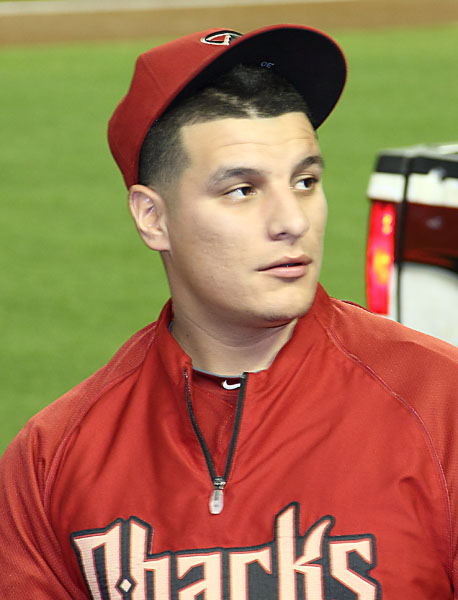
Hernandez with the Diamondbacks

On December 6, 2010, he was traded to the Arizona Diamondbacks (along with Kam Mickolio) for Mark Reynolds and a player to be named later (John Hester). In his first season in Arizona, Hernandez served as a closer for a time in the season, recording 11 saves. In a career high 74 games, he had 77 strikeouts in 69 1/3 innings. He excelled the following season, posting an ERA of 2.50 with 98 strikeouts in 68 1/3 innings. In 2013, he had a high ERA (4.48) despite posting 66 strikeouts in 62 1/3 innings.

Hernandez missed the 2014 season after undergoing Tommy John surgery.

He came back in 2015, posting an ERA of 4.28 in 40 games.

=== Philadelphia Phillies ===
On December 9, 2015, Hernandez signed with the Philadelphia Phillies. In his season with Philadelphia, he appeared in 70 games and posted a 3.84 ERA in 72 2/3 innings.

=== San Francisco Giants ===
On February 14, 2017, Hernandez signed a minor league contract with the San Francisco Giants.

=== Atlanta Braves ===
On March 26, 2017, the Atlanta Braves signed Hernandez to a minor league contract.

=== Los Angeles Angels ===
On April 24, 2017, the Braves traded Hernandez to the Los Angeles Angels in exchange for a player to be named later or cash considerations. He appeared in 38 games for the Angels and pitched 36.1 innings, had 37 strikeouts, and finished with a 2.23 ERA before being traded to the Diamondbacks on July 31.

=== Arizona Diamondbacks (second stint) ===
On July 31, 2017, Hernandez was traded to the Diamondbacks for Luis Madero. He was 2–1 with a 4.82 ERA.

=== Cincinnati Reds ===
On January 30, 2018, Hernandez signed a two-year contract with the Cincinnati Reds. In his first season in Cincinnati, Hernandez appeared in 57 games, registering an ERA of 2.53 in 64 innings. The following season did not go so well for Hernandez as he struggled throughout the season before being designated for assignment on August 10, 2019. He was 2–5 with an ERA of 8.02 in 47 games. On August 10, 2019, the Reds released Hernandez.

=== New York Yankees ===
On August 15, 2019, Hernandez signed a minor league deal with the New York Yankees. He was released on September 4, 2019.

=== Cleveland Indians ===
On January 3, 2020, Hernandez signed a minor league deal the Washington Nationals. He was released by the organization on March 14.

On July 3, 2020, Hernandez signed a minor league contract with the Cleveland Indians. Hernandez did not play in a game in 2020 due to the cancellation of the minor league season because of the COVID-19 pandemic. He was released by the organization on September 20.

== International career ==
Hernandez attempted to join Team Mexico in the 2013 World Baseball Classic, but was not able to put together the proper documentation in time. After an injury to Chris Perez, Hernandez was asked to join Team USA.

== Scouting report ==
Hernandez throws a 95 mph fastball, a 78 mph slider, and an 84 mph changeup. He is known for his high strikeout rate, which improved at every level in the minors, from 9.54 K/9 in Single–A to 12.46 K/9 in Triple–A. In the minor leagues he was a flyball pitcher – 45% of balls in play were flyballs, with only 38% of them staying on the ground.
