= Matt Albers =

American baseball player (born 1983)

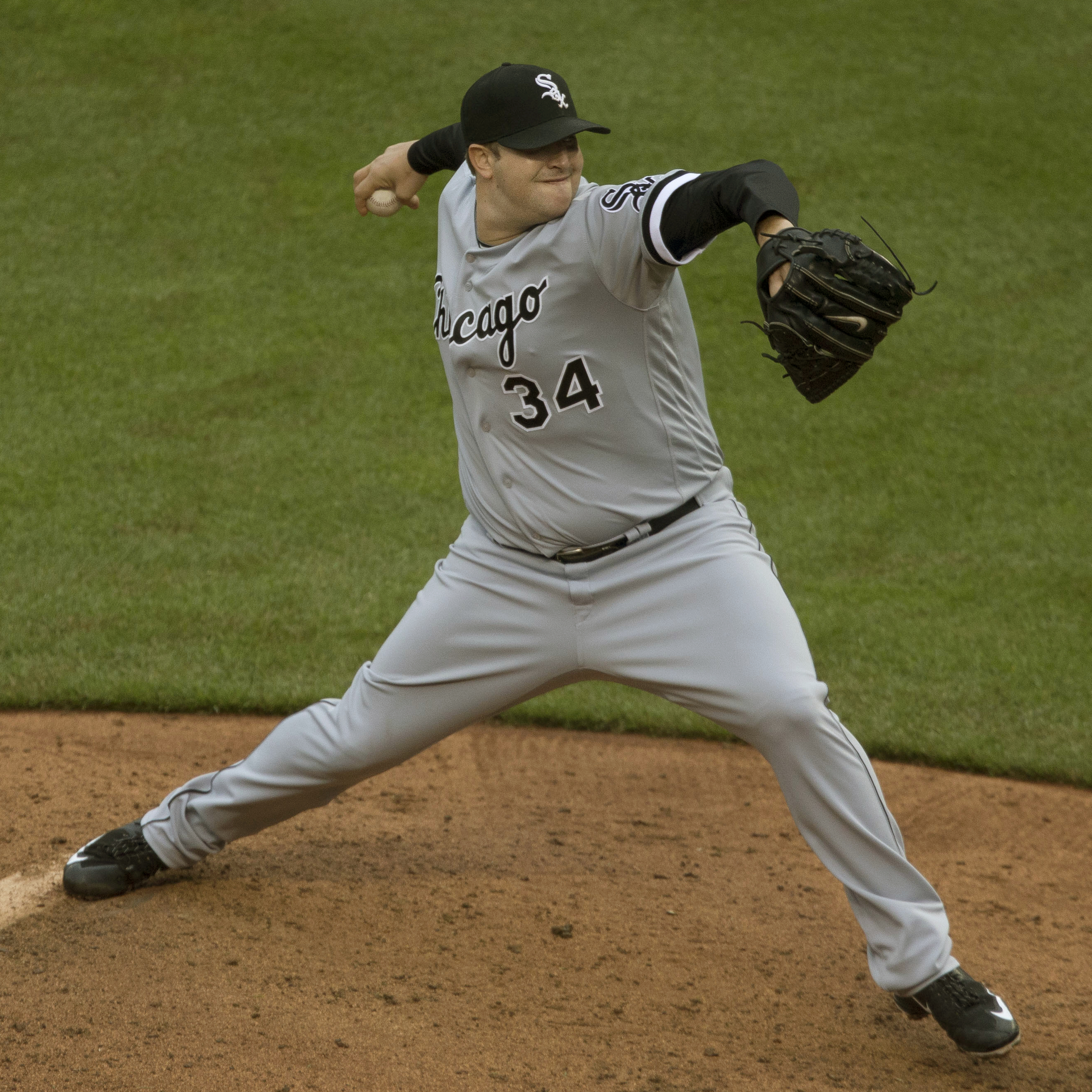
- Albers pitching for the Chicago White Sox in 2016
- Pitcher
- Born: January 20, 1983 (age 43); Houston, Texas, U.S.
- Batted: Left Threw: Right

MLB debut
- July 25, 2006, for the Houston Astros

Last MLB appearance
- September 28, 2019, for the Milwaukee Brewers

MLB statistics
- Win–loss record: 47–48
- Earned run average: 4.35
- Strikeouts: 571
- Stats at Baseball Reference

Teams
- Houston Astros (2006–2007); Baltimore Orioles (2008–2010); Boston Red Sox (2011–2012); Arizona Diamondbacks (2012); Cleveland Indians (2013); Houston Astros (2014); Chicago White Sox (2015–2016); Washington Nationals (2017); Milwaukee Brewers (2018–2019)

Matthew James Albers (born January 20, 1983) is an American former professional baseball pitcher. He played in Major League Baseball (MLB) for the Houston Astros, Baltimore Orioles, Boston Red Sox, Arizona Diamondbacks, Cleveland Indians, Chicago White Sox, Washington Nationals, and Milwaukee Brewers.

== High school career ==
In 2001, Albers graduated from William P. Clements High School in Sugar Land, Texas. That year, the Houston Astros selected him in the 23rd round (686th overall) of the 2001 MLB draft.

== Professional career ==
=== Houston Astros ===
==== Minor leagues ====
Albers made his professional debut in 2002 with the rookie–level Martinsville Astros, going 2–3 with a 5.13 earned run average (ERA) in 13 starts. He then spent the next three seasons climbing up the Single–A ranks, spending a season each with the Tri-City ValleyCats, Lexington Legends and Salem Avalanche. Albers started the 2006 season with the Corpus Christi Hooks of the Double–A Texas League, posting a 10–2 win–loss record with a 2.17 ERA in 19 starts.

==== Major leagues ====
On July 20, 2006, the Astros called him up to the major leagues. Albers pitched a few games in relief, then made his first Major League start against the San Diego Padres on August 3, 2006, allowing five runs on eight hits in five-plus innings. The Astros then sent Albers to the Round Rock Express of the Triple–A Pacific Coast League two days later. The Astros promoted Albers back to the major leagues when rosters expanded in September. In 2006, Albers was named Texas League Pitcher of the Year.

Albers got his first Major League win on May 5, 2007, against the St. Louis Cardinals, when he pitched 7 1/3 innings without giving up a run.

=== Baltimore Orioles ===
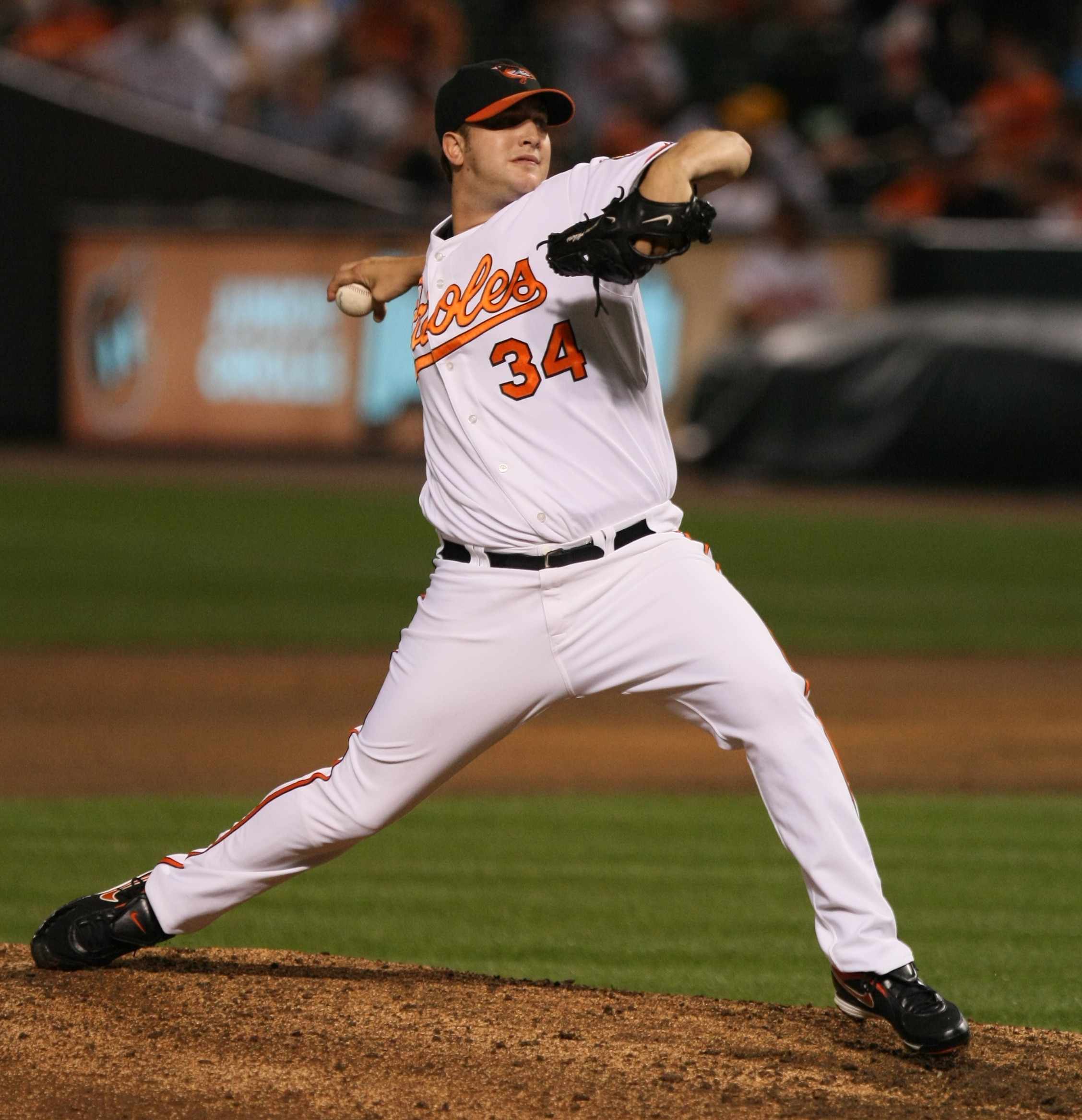
Albers pitching for the Baltimore Orioles in 2009

After being a starting pitcher for two years, Albers was traded to the Baltimore Orioles on December 12, 2007, as part of the Miguel Tejada trade. In the middle of the 2008 season, he was placed on the disabled list due to a torn labrum in his right shoulder. He became a free agent following the 2010 season.

=== Boston Red Sox ===
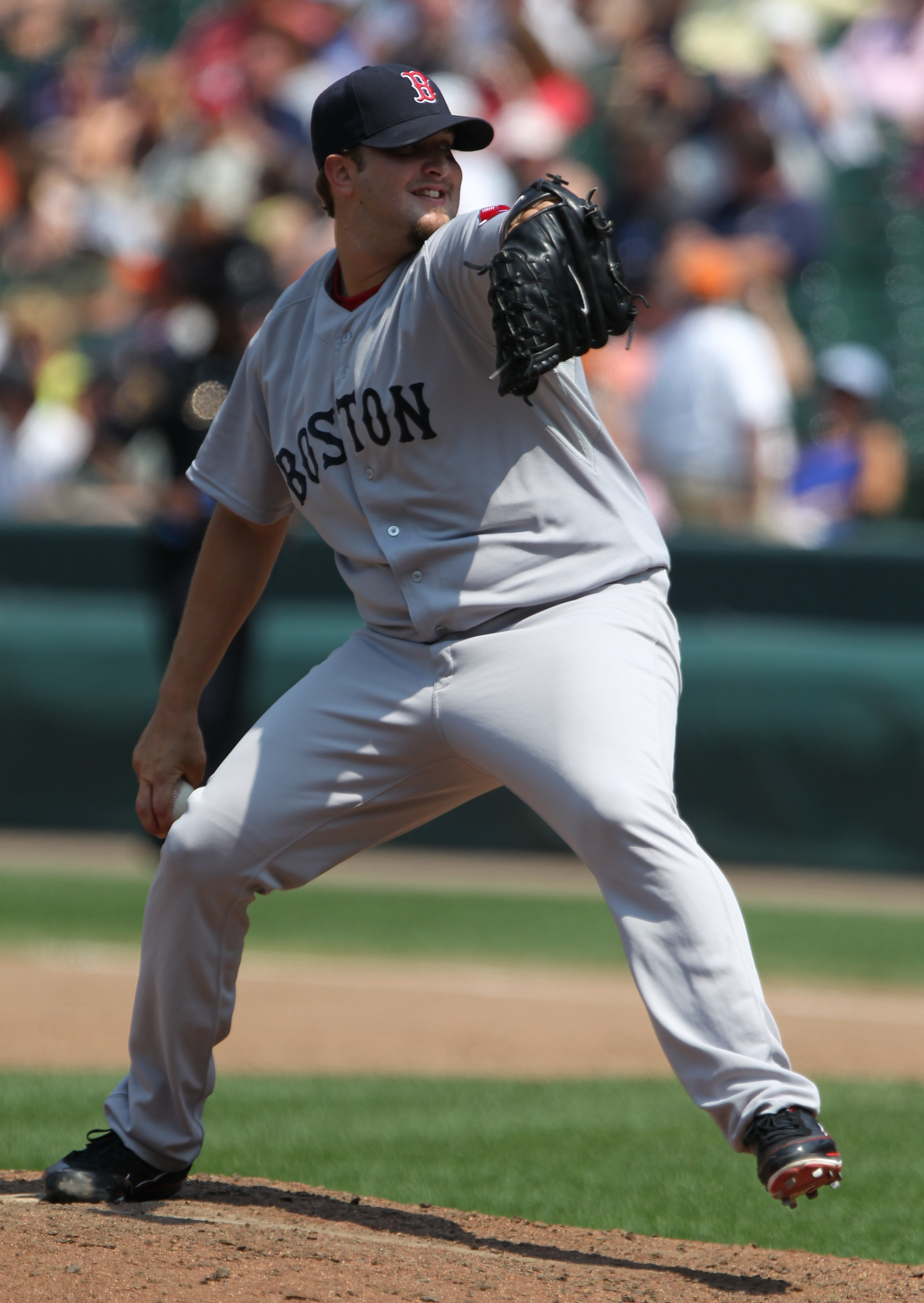
Albers with the Red Sox in 2011

On December 16, 2010, Albers signed a one-year contract with the Boston Red Sox. With the 2011 Red Sox, he made 56 relief appearances, compiling a 4–4 record with 4.73 ERA, 68 strikeouts, and 31 walks in 64 2/3 innings pitched.

On December 12, 2011, Albers signed a one-year deal to return to Boston, thus avoiding arbitration. During his time with the 2012 Red Sox, he made 40 relief appearances and posted a 2–0 record with a 2.29 ERA, 25 strikeouts and 15 walks in 39 1/3 innings pitched.

=== Arizona Diamondbacks ===
On July 31, 2012, the Red Sox traded Albers and outfielder Scott Podsednik to the Arizona Diamondbacks for relief pitcher Craig Breslow. In 23 relief appearances with Arizona, Albers went 1–1 with a 2.57 ERA.

=== Cleveland Indians ===
On December 11, 2012, Albers was traded along with relief pitcher Bryan Shaw and starting pitcher Trevor Bauer to the Cleveland Indians as part of a three-way deal involving the Diamondbacks and Cincinnati Reds. Drew Stubbs went from the Reds to the Indians, the Arizona Diamondbacks received relief pitcher Tony Sipp and first baseman Lars Anderson from the Indians, and shortstop Didi Gregorius from the Reds. The Cincinnati Reds received right fielder Shin-Soo Choo, infielder Jason Donald, and $3.5 million from Cleveland. He became a free agent following the 2013 season.

=== Houston Astros (second stint) ===
On December 16, 2013, Albers signed a one-year contract worth $2.45 million that came with a club option for 2015. In 8 games for the Astros in 2014, he posted an 0.90 ERA with 8 strikeouts over 10 innings pitched. Houston declined his 2015 option on October 9, 2014, making him a free agent.

=== Chicago White Sox ===
On February 13, 2015, he signed a minor league contract with the Chicago White Sox. He had his contract selected to the major league roster on April 5. On April 22, 2015, Albers was involved in a bench-clearing brawl against the Kansas City Royals. Albers suffered a fractured finger trying to escape the fracas, which placed him on the 15-day disabled list.

On January 21, 2016, Albers signed a one-year, $2.25 million contract. On June 1, 2016, Albers hit a double in the 13th inning, advanced on a wild pitch, and scored on a sacrifice fly. It proved to be the winning run as the White Sox won against the Mets 2–1. He became a free agent following the 2016 season.

=== Washington Nationals ===
On January 31, 2017, Albers signed a minor league contract with the Washington Nationals that included an invitation to spring training. He was released on March 27, 2017, despite giving up no earned runs over 11 2/3 innings. The Nationals re-signed Albers, and promoted him to the major leagues on April 9. On May 5, 2017, Albers recorded his first career save in a 4–2 victory over the Philadelphia Phillies. He became a free agent following the 2017 season.

=== Milwaukee Brewers ===
On January 30, 2018, Albers signed a two-year, $5 million deal, with the Milwaukee Brewers. He became a free agent following the 2019 season.

== Pitching style ==
Albers is mainly a sinkerball pitcher, throwing it in the 93–96 mph range. He complements the sinker with a hard slider and an occasional curveball.

== Personal life ==
As of 2017, Albers and his family reside in The Woodlands, Texas, a suburb of Houston.

Albers' wife Tara was eight months pregnant with the couple's second child when Hurricane Harvey hit the region in August 2017. She and their son evacuated to Dallas as a result of the storm. Albers partnered with Washington Nationals teammate Anthony Rendon, a fellow Houstonian, to set up a YouCaring fundraiser page to raise money for donations to the Houston Food Bank in the wake of the hurricane.
