= Chris Tillman =

American baseball player (born 1988)

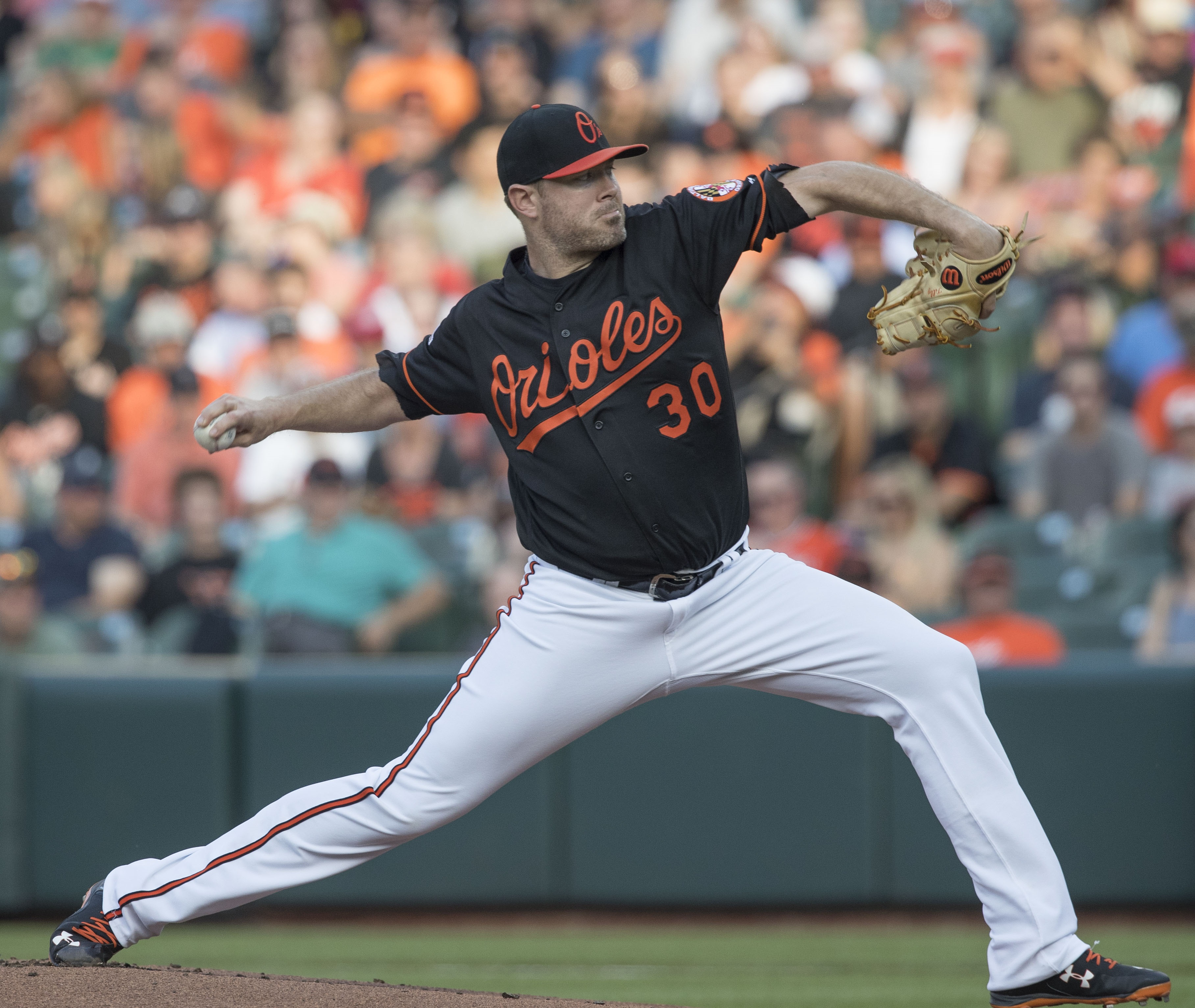
- Tillman pitching for the Orioles in 2017
- Pitcher
- Born: April 15, 1988 (age 38); Anaheim, California, U.S.
- Batted: Right Threw: Right

MLB debut
- July 29, 2009, for the Baltimore Orioles

Last MLB appearance
- May 10, 2018, for the Baltimore Orioles

MLB statistics
- Win–loss record: 74–60
- Earned run average: 4.57
- Strikeouts: 847
- Stats at Baseball Reference

Teams
- Baltimore Orioles (2009–2018)

Career highlights and awards
- All-Star (2013)

Christopher Steven Tillman (born April 15, 1988) is an American former professional baseball pitcher. He made his Major League Baseball (MLB) debut with the Baltimore Orioles in 2009, and played with them until 2018. He was named an All-Star in 2013.

== Early life ==
Tillman was born in Anaheim, California and attended Fountain Valley High School in Fountain Valley, California. He committed to play college baseball for Cal State Fullerton.

== Baseball career ==
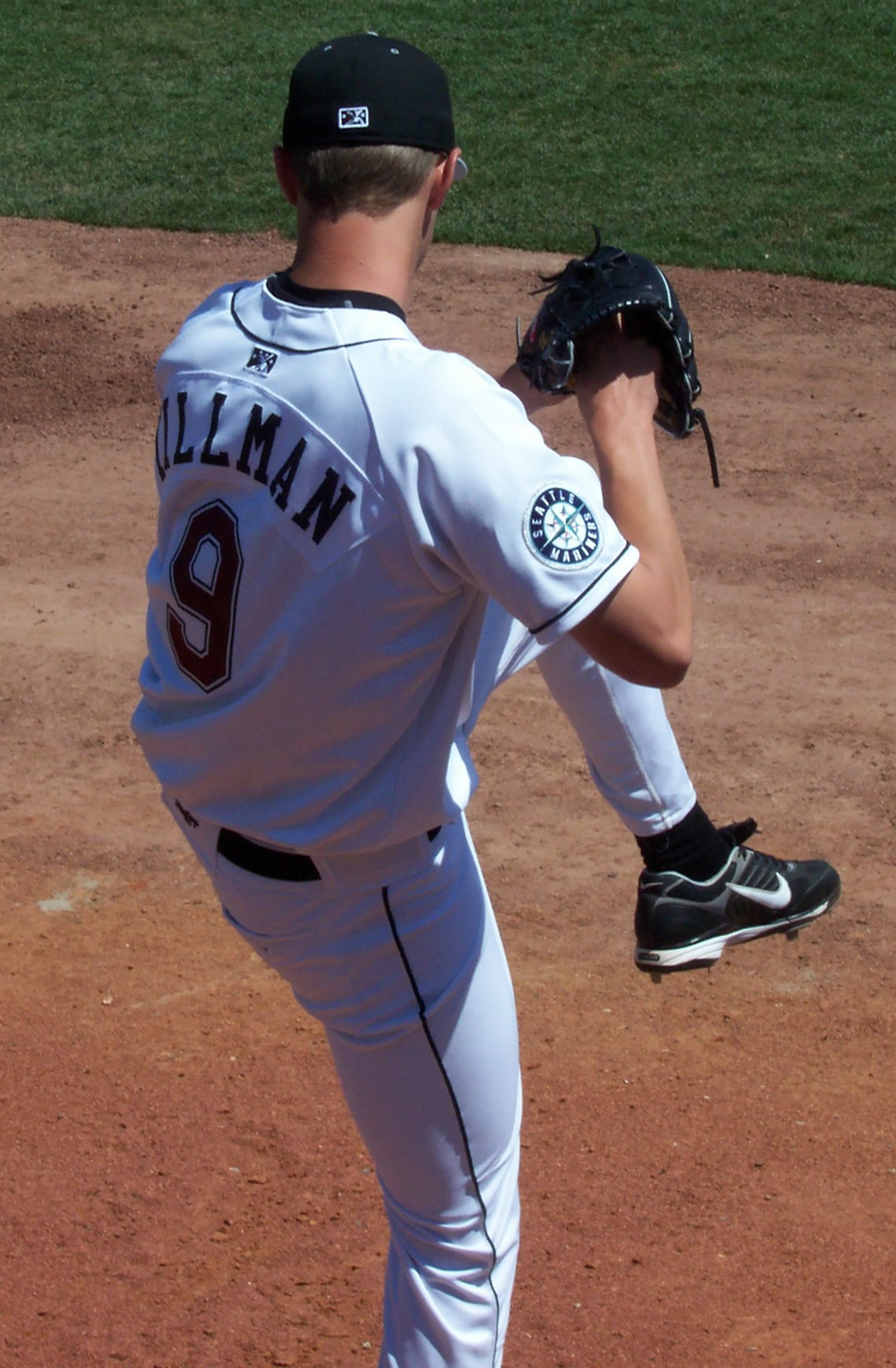
Warming up before a minor league start

=== Seattle Mariners ===
Tillman was drafted by the Seattle Mariners in the second round of the 2006 Major League Baseball draft. He spent his first professional campaign split between the rookie-level Arizona League Mariners and the Low-A Everett AquaSox. In 10 games (5 starts) between the two teams, he pitched to a 3-3 record and 5.28 ERA with 45 strikeouts in 30.2 innings pitched. In 2007, Tillman split the season between the Single-A Wisconsin Timber Rattlers and the High-A High Desert Mavericks, pitching to a cumulative 7-11 record and 4.84 ERA with 139 strikeouts in 135.2 innings pitched across 28 starts.

=== Baltimore Orioles ===
On February 9, 2008, Tillman, along with Adam Jones, George Sherrill, Kam Mickolio, and Tony Butler, were traded to the Baltimore Orioles for Érik Bédard.

According to Baseball America, he was Baltimore's second best prospect, behind only Matt Wieters.

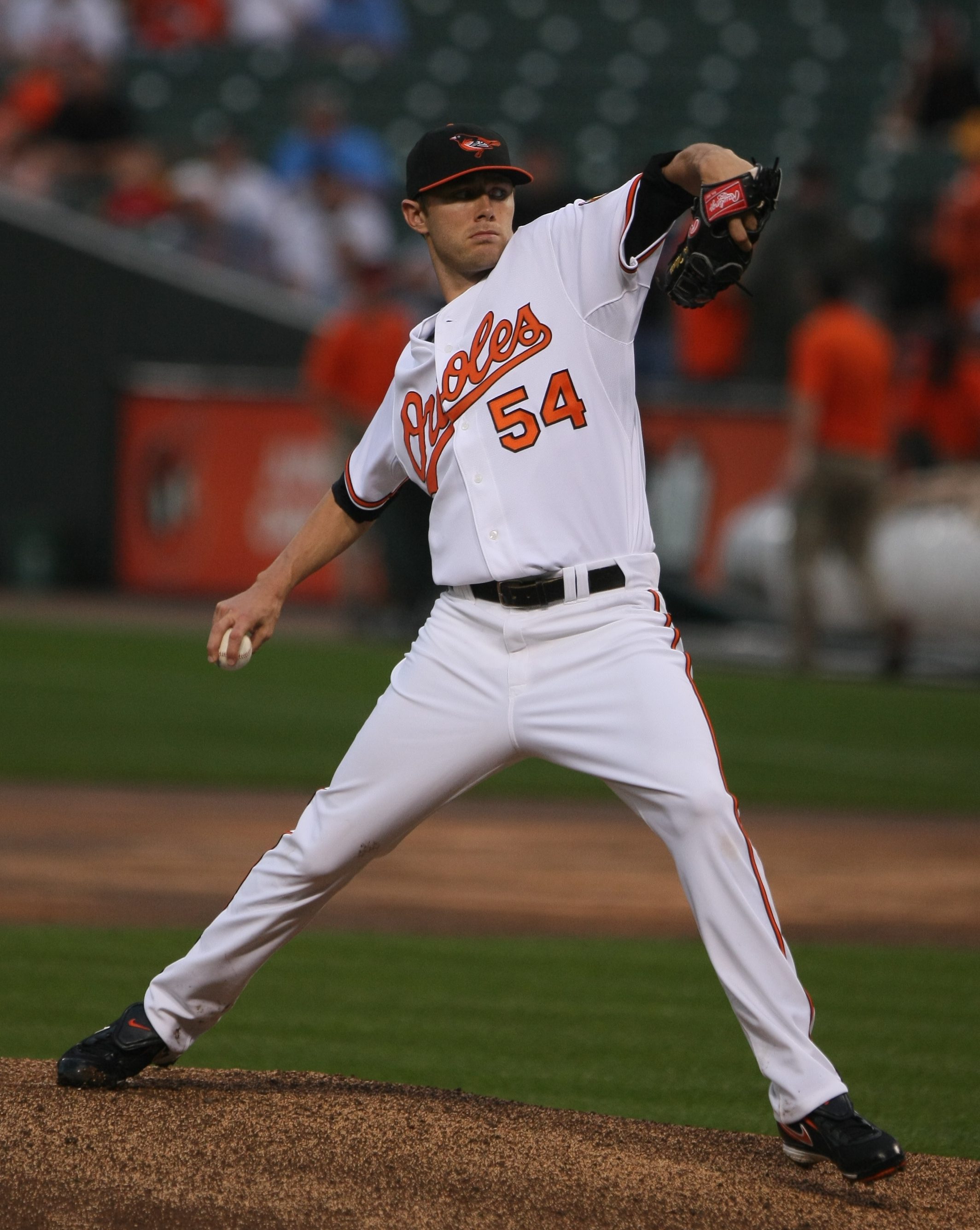
Tillman with the Orioles in 2009

On July 29, 2009, the Orioles selected Tillman's contract from Norfolk, and he would make his major league debut against the Kansas City Royals. He pitched 4 2/3 innings, allowing three runs on three solo home runs. The Orioles ended up winning 7–3, leaving Tillman with a no decision. Tillman's best start of his rookie campaign came on September 16 against the Tampa Bay Rays. In a tough-luck no decision, Tillman tossed 6 2/3 of one-run ball, while only allowing five hits.

Tillman finished the year, making 12 starts and posting a 2–5 record with a 5.40 ERA.

On March 30, the Orioles sent Tillman to the Norfolk Tides. On April 28, 2010, Tillman threw a no-hitter at the Gwinnett Braves as the Triple-A Norfolk Tides won the game 6–0. This no-hitter was the first for the Tides since 1992.

On October 1, Tillman struck out a career-high seven batters against the Detroit Tigers. Tillman was optioned between the majors throughout 2010 and Tillman started for the O's during the 2010 campaign. He once again posted a 2–5 record with a 5.87 ERA in 11 starts.

On April 2, 2011, Tillman carried a no-hitter through six innings against the Tampa Bay Rays in the Orioles second game of the season. He was lifted by manager Buck Showalter after the sixth inning, however, as Tillman's pitch count was already up to 101 pitches. The team no-hitter was lost the following inning by Jeremy Accardo but the Orioles did go on to win 3–1. The Orioles did not score their runs until the 8th inning, giving Tillman a no-decision.

Despite this good start, Tillman's inconsistency and struggle to get opposing batters out led to him making only 13 starts for the Orioles. He struggled with a 3–5 record and 5.52 ERA, and allowed opposing batters to hit .301 off of him.

On March 31, 2012, the Orioles decided to option Tillman to the Tides rather than include him on their starting rotation. He posted an 8–8 record with the Tides in 16 games, pitching to a 3.63 ERA with 30 walks and 92 strikeouts. Tillman made his return to the Orioles on July 4, 2012, allowing only 2 hits over 8 1/3 innings against the Mariners and recording his first major league win of the season. Tillman had his breakout half and went on to make 15 starts, posting a 9–3 record with a 2.93 ERA in 86 innings. He was able to hold hitters to a .207 average and he had a 1.05 WHIP.

The 2013 season was a breakout one for Tillman. He assumed the role of ace of the rotation and compiled the most wins of any pitcher on the staff. Although he did not get the call to pitch, Tillman was selected to his first All Star Game, by American League manager Jim Leyland, after Justin Verlander decided not to go. On August 29, Tillman became the first Oriole pitcher since Erik Bedard in 2006 to record 15 victories in a single season, winning against the Boston Red Sox, pitching 7 innings, allowing two runs, no walks and striking out 8. On September 9, Tillman recorded his 16th win, going into the 8th inning against the New York Yankees, allowing 2 runs (both solo home runs), 4 hits and no walks, while striking out 9. Tillman ended the season with 16 wins, the most of any Orioles pitcher since Mike Mussina had 18 in 1999. He pitched 206 1/3 innings, struck out 179 batters and had a final ERA of 3.71.

On March 17, 2014, manager Buck Showalter announced that Tillman would be the Orioles' Opening Day starter, for the first time in his career, on March 31, against the Boston Red Sox. He received a no-decision, going 5 innings, allowing one run, and striking out 4. On April 6, Tillman earned his first win of 2014, going 8 1/3 innings against the Detroit Tigers, allowing one run and striking out 5. On May 17, Tillman pitched his first career complete-game shutout, against the Kansas City Royals. Tillman made his first career postseason start during Game 1 of the American League Division Series, against the Detroit Tigers. He was the winning pitcher, going 5 innings, allowing 2 runs, and striking out 6, as the Orioles defeated the Tigers 12–3. The Orioles would eventually get swept in the 2014 American League Championship Series. Tillman finished the season with a career-high 34 starts, 207 1/3 innings pitched, and a 13–6 record. His 15 no decisions were the most among MLB starting pitchers in 2014. He recorded a 3.34 ERA and 1.23 WHIP while striking out 150 batters.

On May 7, 2015, Tillman surrendered a home run to Alex Rodriguez, which moved Rodriguez into sole possession of fourth place on the all time home run list, surpassing Willie Mays. After struggling greatly in the first half of the season, Tillman started off the second half of the year with one of the most dominant starts of his career, going eight innings, allowing only one hit and no runs, including retiring the last 23 batters he faced, against the Detroit Tigers. In addition, it was Tillman's fourth career outing in which he had allowed one or fewer hits over the course of six-plus innings. In his very next start, he pitched 7.0-plus innings and didn't give up a run until the seventh inning, ending his career-high 16-inning scoreless streak. In his third post-All-Star start, Tillman continued his dominance with a no-run, four hit, 8 2/3 inning performance. His season ERA was lowered to 4.35 (it had been 5.40 going into the second half). However, Tillman struggled through the rest of the season, as he finished 11–11 in 31 starts with a 4.99 ERA. The Orioles finished 81–81 and missed out on the postseason.

Tillman was named the Orioles Opening Day starter for the third consecutive year in 2016. Due to two separate rain delays, Tillman was able to throw only two complete innings. However, he struck out the final five batters he faced, and the Orioles went on to win in the bottom of the ninth 3–2, giving them their sixth consecutive Opening Day victory under manager Buck Showalter. Tillman pitched to a 2–1 and 3.24 ERA in the month of April and seemed to have his consistency, which he lacked in 2015, back. In May, Tillman went 5–0 in six starts, pitching to a 2.72 ERA in 39 2/3 with 37 strikeouts. In addition, he held opponents to a .197 batting average. On June 8, Tillman pitched his best game of the year, going 7 1/3 shutout innings, walking no batters, and tied a career-high with nine strikeouts. It was Tillman's 3rd game on the year with nine strikeouts, and his fourth start pitching at least seven innings.

At the All-Star break, Tillman had compiled a 12–2 record with a 3.41 ERA in 113 1/3 innings, while striking out 98 batters.

On July 21, after tossing seven innings of one-run ball to snap a four-game losing streak for the O's, Tillman recorded his 14th win of the season. He became the first Oriole pitcher since 2003 to win 14 decisions in their first 21 starts. The O's improved to 18–3 when Tillman was pitching.

After battling injuries late in the season, which included a DL stint, Tillman's season ended, having greatly improved on his disappointing 2015 campaign. He compiled a 16–6 record in 30 starts with a 3.77 ERA in 172 innings pitched in 2016. He struck out 140 batters with a 1.29 WHIP, while allowing a career-low 19 home runs.

On October 3, Tillman was named the starting pitcher for the Orioles Wild Card game against the Toronto Blue Jays. Tillman tossed 4 2/3 innings, allowing just four hits and a walk, along with two runs, while striking out four batters. Tillman left the game with runners on the corners, and teammate Mychal Givens came in and induced a double play. The Orioles would go on to lose 5–2 in 11 innings.

After starting the first month of the season on the DL due to a shoulder injury, Tillman made his season debut against the Chicago White Sox on May 7. He tossed five scoreless innings and earned his first victory of the year as the Orioles would win 4–0. The win was Tillman's 73rd career victory, tying him with Sidney Ponson and Lefty Stewart for 20th in franchise history. For the season, Tillman endured his worst season in his career, as he was mostly ineffective and injured throughout. He finished 1–7 with a career worst 7.84 ERA in 24 games, 19 starts.

On February 19, 2018, Tillman and the Orioles signed a one-year contract for $3 million. After struggling through his first four starts, Tillman pitched seven one-hit, shutout innings against the Tigers to earn his first win in 27 appearances dating back to May 2017. He moved in to 20th place on the Orioles All-time win list. On July 20, 2018, he was designated for assignment. Tillman elected free agency on July 25, 2018.

=== Texas Rangers ===
On August 2, 2018, Tillman signed a minor-league contract with the Texas Rangers. He made four appearances for the Triple-A Round Rock Express to finish the year, struggling to a 9.00 ERA with 5 strikeouts in 9 innings pitched. He elected free agency following the season on November 2.

Tillman did not play in a game in 2019, taking the season off after having surgery to clean up the labrum in his right shoulder in June.

=== Comeback attempts ===
On December 27, 2019, it was announced that Tillman was attempting a comeback and was planning to throw for teams in Spring Training for the 2020 season.

On May 12, 2021, Tillman announced he was making another comeback attempt. He had been working with his former pitching coach in Baltimore, Dave Wallace at Cressey Sports Performance since February.

On January 9, 2023, it was announced that Tillman would be attempting another comeback after recovering from shoulder surgery. Baseball reference sites do not list any professional appearances by Tillman after 2018.

== Pitching style ==
Tillman threw four pitches: a four seam fastball at 91–95 mph (146–153 km/h), occasionally touching 96 mph (154 km/h), a cutter at 83–87 mph (134–140 km/h), a curveball at 75–78 mph (121–126 km/h) that reached 80 mph (130 km/h) during the first month of his career, and a changeup, thrown mostly to lefties, at 78–84 mph (126–135 km/h). The curveball and changeup were Tillman's "out pitches".

== Personal life ==
Tillman married girlfriend Christina Hellman in November 2014 in Tampa, Florida. The couple welcomed their first child, a daughter, in July 2017.

== See also ==
- List of Major League Baseball players who spent their entire career with one franchise
