= Lou Montañez =

American baseball player (born 1981)

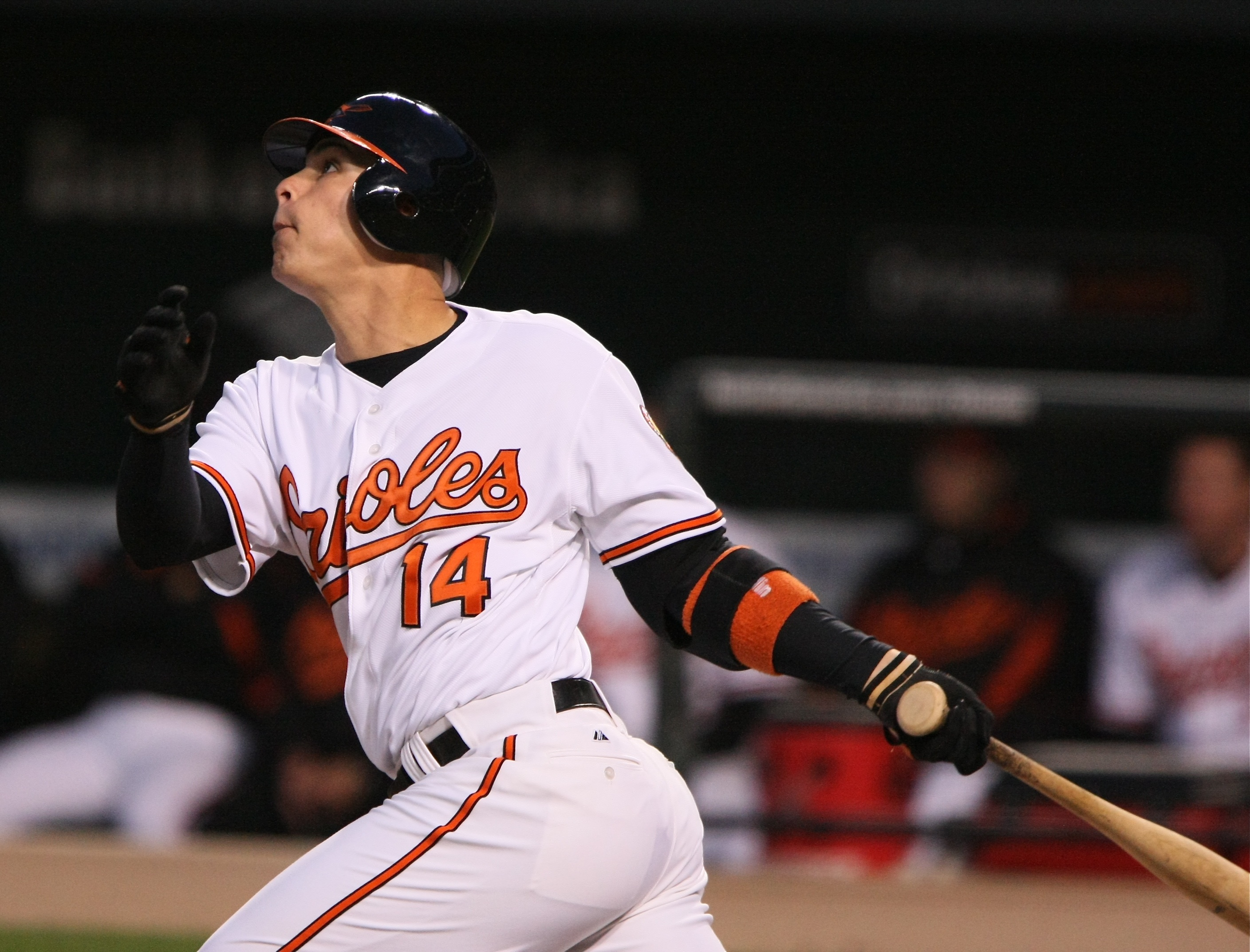
- Montañez with the Baltimore Orioles in 2009
- Outfielder
- Born: December 15, 1981 (age 43); Bayamón, Puerto Rico
- Batted: Right Threw: Right

MLB debut
- August 5, 2008, for the Baltimore Orioles

Last MLB appearance
- September 28, 2011, for the Chicago Cubs

MLB statistics
- Batting average: .223
- Home runs: 5
- Runs batted in: 32
- Stats at Baseball Reference

Teams
- Baltimore Orioles (2008–2010); Chicago Cubs (2011)

Career highlights and awards
- Hit a home run in first major league at-bat

Luis Anibal Montañez (born December 15, 1981) is a Puerto Rican former professional baseball outfielder. He played in Major League Baseball (MLB) for the Baltimore Orioles and Chicago Cubs.

== Professional career ==
=== Chicago Cubs ===
Montañez was drafted by the Chicago Cubs with the third overall pick of the 2000 MLB draft. He spent seven seasons in the Cubs' farm system but never made it to the major leagues.

=== Baltimore Orioles ===
On January 5, 2007, Montañez signed a minor league contract with the Baltimore Orioles organization. After batting .335 with 26 home runs and 97 RBI in 116 games for the Orioles' Double-A affiliate, the Bowie Baysox, he was called up to the majors for the first time. In 2008, Montañez won the Eastern League Triple Crown despite missing nearly a month of the season after getting called up to the majors.

Montañez made his major league debut on August 5, 2008, playing an inning defensively and without making a plate appearance. The next day, he hit a home run in his first major-league at bat, (Note: Both MLB.com and Baseball-Reference.com list Montañez's debut as April 28, 2008, in a suspended game that was subsequently resumed and completed on August 25, 2008. Although Montañez only entered the game as a pinch hitter on the latter date, the game is recorded as having been played on the day it started (April 28). The Elias Sports Bureau still credits Montañez with a home run in his first MLB at bat, however, because he was not in the major leagues on April 28.) making him the second Oriole to accomplish the feat, the first having been Buster Narum in 1963. After starting the 2009 season playing for the Orioles Triple-A affiliate, Norfolk Tides, Montañez was recalled to the majors on April 21 after an injury to Ryan Freel. On November 10, 2010, Montanez became a minor league free agent.

=== Chicago Cubs (second stint) ===
Montañez signed a minor league contract with the Chicago Cubs on January 12, 2011. He was called up from the Iowa Cubs on May 24, and was in the lineup that night at Wrigley Field against the New York Mets. His first at-bat resulted in an RBI double. He elected free agency on November 28.

=== Philadelphia Phillies ===
Montañez was signed to a minor league contract by the Philadelphia Phillies on December 21, 2011. He also received an invitation to spring training. Montañez began the year with the Triple-A Lehigh Valley IronPigs, for whom he batted .136/.264/.159 with one RBI across 17 games. Montañez was released by the Phillies organization on May 4.

=== St. Louis Cardinals ===
On May 21, 2012, Montañez signed a minor league contract with the St. Louis Cardinals and was assigned to the Triple-A Memphis Redbirds. In 84 appearances for Memphis, he hit .259/.350/.316 with two home runs and 25 RBI.

=== Somerset Patriots ===
On April 3, 2013, Montañez signed with the Somerset Patriots of the Atlantic League of Professional Baseball. In 52 games with the club, he slashed .313/.359/.478 with six home runs and 41 RBI.

=== Los Angeles Angels of Anaheim ===
On June 20, 2013, Montañez signed a minor league contract with the Los Angeles Angels of Anaheim. He was subsequently assigned to the Double-A Arkansas Travelers, where he batted .284/.322/.457 with three home runs, 14 RBI, and three stolen bases.

=== Somerset Patriots (second stint) ===
On April 25, 2014, Montañez again signed with the Somerset Patriots of the Atlantic League of Professional Baseball. In 130 appearances for the Patriots, he batted .289/.350/.471 with 17 home runs, 74 RBI, and five stolen bases. Montañez became a free agent after the season.

== See also ==
- List of players with a home run in first major league at-bat
