= 2008 Baltimore Orioles season =

Major League Baseball season

2008 Baltimore Orioles
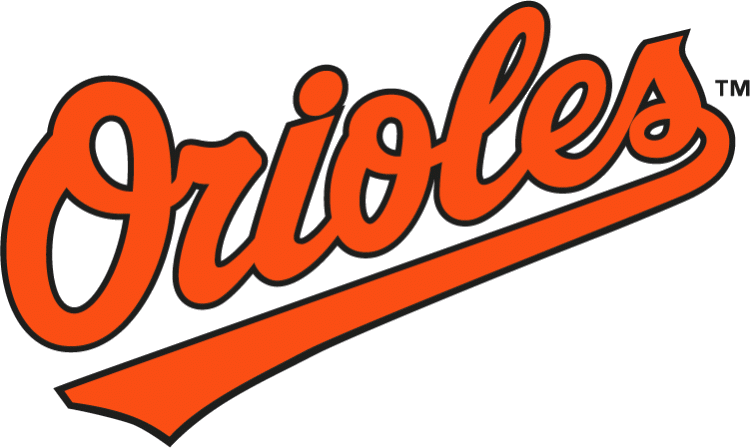
- League: American League
- Division: East
- Ballpark: Oriole Park at Camden Yards
- City: Baltimore
- Record: 68–93 (.421)
- Divisional place: 5th
- Owners: Peter Angelos
- General managers: Andy MacPhail
- Managers: Dave Trembley
- Television: MASN; WJZ-TV (CBS 13)
- Radio: WHFS

The 2008 Baltimore Orioles season was the 108th season in Baltimore Orioles franchise history, the 55th in Baltimore, and the 17th at Oriole Park at Camden Yards.

The Orioles entered the 2008 season led by Dave Trembley, now starting his first full season as manager. President of Baseball Operations Andy MacPhail continued the rebuilding process. Superstars Miguel Tejada and Érik Bédard were traded for younger talent and there were talks of Brian Roberts, but he was not traded.

The Baltimore Orioles posted a record of 68–93 and finished in last place in the AL East for the first time since the 1988 season.

Closer Chris Ray missed the entire season after Tommy John surgery, and so did his replacement Danys Báez. Left-hander George Sherrill, acquired from the Mariners, was named the team's closer for the 2008 season and became the lone representative for the 2008 Major League Baseball All-Star Game, while Jeremy Guthrie was the Opening Day starter after an impressive rookie season and several solid spring training outings.

== Offseason ==
=== Transactions ===
- On December 12, 2007, the Orioles traded shortstop Miguel Tejada to the Houston Astros for outfielder Luke Scott, pitchers Matt Albers, Troy Patton, Dennis Sarfate and third baseman Mike Costanzo.
- On February 8, 2008, the Orioles traded left-handed pitcher Érik Bédard to the Seattle Mariners for outfielder Adam Jones, pitchers George Sherrill, Chris Tillman, Tony Butler and Kam Mickolio.

=== New coaches ===
- Rick Kranitz – Orioles pitching coach
- John Shelby – Orioles 1st base coach

== Regular season ==
=== Roster ===
2008 Baltimore Orioles
Roster
Pitchers: 34 Matt Albers; 35 Greg Aquino; 59 Brian Bass; 51 Randor Bierd; 53 Chad Bradford; 23,60 Ryan Bukvich; 56 Brian Burres; 40 Daniel Cabrera; 26 Fernando Cabrera; 23 Alberto Castillo; 23,57 Rocky Cherry; 54 Lance Cormier; 46 Jeremy Guthrie; 43 Jim Johnson; 62 Radhames Liz; 29 Adam Loewen; 31,41 Bob McCrory; 31 Kam Mickolio; 25 Jim Miller; 18,57 Garrett Olson; 45 Dennis Sarfate; 51,52 George Sherrill; 58 Alfredo Simón; 41 Steve Trachsel; 32 Jamie Walker; 29 Chris Waters	Catchers: 18,55 Ramón Hernández; 24 Guillermo Quiróz; 63 Omir Santos; Infielders: 3 Freddie Bynum; 2 Juan Castro; 13,19 Alex Cintrón; 12 Brandon Fahey; 2 Luis Hernández; 17,19 Aubrey Huff; 15 Kevin Millar; 9,43 Scott Moore; 6 Melvin Mora; 1 Brian Roberts; 19 Oscar Salazar; 14 Eider Torres	Outfielders: 10 Adam Jones; 21 Nick Markakis; 3 Lou Montañez; 16 Jay Payton; 30 Luke Scott	Manager: 47 Dave Trembley; Coaches: 48 Terry Crowley (hitting); 36 Alan Dunn (bullpen); 50 Dave Jauss (bench); 39 Rick Kranitz (pitching); 11 Juan Samuel (third base); 38 John Shelby (first base)

=== Season standings ===
AL East
Team	W	L	Pct.	GB	Home	Road
Tampa Bay Rays	97	65	.599	—	57‍–‍24	40‍–‍41
Boston Red Sox	95	67	.586	2	56‍–‍25	39‍–‍42
New York Yankees	89	73	.549	8	48‍–‍33	41‍–‍40
Toronto Blue Jays	86	76	.531	11	47‍–‍34	39‍–‍42
Baltimore Orioles	68	93	.422	28½	37‍–‍43	31‍–‍50

=== Record vs. opponents ===
2008 American League record Source: MLB Standings Grid – 2008
Team	BAL	BOS	CWS	CLE	DET	KC	LAA	MIN	NYY	OAK	SEA	TB	TEX	TOR	NL
Baltimore	–	6–12	4–5	4–4	4–3	5–3	3–6	3–3	7–11	0–5	8–2	3–15	4–5	6–12	11–7
Boston	12–6	–	4–3	5–1	5–2	6–1	1–8	4–3	9–9	6–4	6–3	8–10	9–1	9–9	11–7
Chicago	5–4	3–4	–	11–7	12–6	12–6	5–5	9–10	2–5	5–4	5–1	4–6	3–3	1–7	12–6
Cleveland	4–4	1–5	7–11	–	11–7	10–8	4–5	8–10	4–3	5–4	4–5	5–2	6–4	6–1	6–12
Detroit	3–4	2–5	6–12	7–11	–	7–11	3–6	7–11	4–2	3–6	7–3	3–4	6–3	3–5	13–5
Kansas City	3–5	1–6	6–12	8–10	11–7	–	2–3	6–12	5–5	6–3	7–2	3–5	2–7	2–5	13–5
Los Angeles	6–3	8–1	5–5	5–4	6–3	3–2	–	5–3	7–3	10–9	14–5	3–6	12–7	6–3	10–8
Minnesota	3–3	3–4	10–9	10–8	11–7	12–6	3–5	–	4–6	5–5	5–4	3–3	5–5	0–6	14–4
New York	11–7	9–9	5–2	3–4	2–4	5–5	3–7	6–4	–	5–1	7–2	11–7	3–4	9–9	10–8
Oakland	5–0	4–6	4–5	4–5	6–3	3–6	9–10	5–5	1–5	-	10–9	3–6	7–12	4–6	10–8
Seattle	2–8	3–6	1–5	5–4	3–7	2–7	5–14	4–5	2–7	9–10	–	3–4	8–11	5–4	9–9
Tampa Bay	15–3	10–8	6–4	2–5	4–3	5–3	6–3	3–3	7–11	6–3	4–3	–	6–3	11–7	12–6
Texas	5–4	1–9	3–3	4–6	3–6	7–2	7–12	5–5	4–3	12–7	11–8	3–6	–	4–4	10–8
Toronto	12–6	9–9	7–1	1–6	5–3	5–2	3–6	6–0	9–9	6–4	4–5	7–11	4–4	–	8–10

== Game log ==
2008 Game Log
March

#	Date	Time	Opponent	Score	Win	Loss	Save	Attendance	Record
1	March 31	3:05 pm	Rays	6 – 2	Shields (1–0)	Guthrie (0–1)		46,807	0–1

April

#	Date	Time	Opponent	Score	Win	Loss	Save	Attendance	Record
2	April 2	7:05 pm	Rays	9 – 6	Walker (1–0)	Reyes (0–1)	Sherrill (1)	10,505	1-1
–	April 3	7:05 pm	Rays	Postponed (rain) Rescheduled for September 23					
3	April 4	7:05 pm	Mariners	7 – 4	Trachsel (1–0)	Washburn (0–1)	Sherrill (2)	14,429	2–1
4	April 5	7:05 pm	Mariners	6 – 4	Albers (1–0)	Batista (0–1)	Sherrill (3)	24,824	3–1
5	April 6	1:35 pm	Mariners	3 – 2	Sarfate (1–0)	Lowe (0–1)		19,215	4–1
6	April 7	3:05 pm	Mariners	5 – 4	Sarfate (2–0)	O'Flaherty (0–1)	Sherrill (4)	10,774	5–1
7	April 8	2:05 pm	@ Rangers	8 – 1	Burres (1–0)	Jennings (0–2)		48,808	6–1
–	April 9	8:05 pm	@ Rangers	Postponed (rain) Rescheduled for April 10					
8	April 10	5:05 pm	@ Rangers	3 – 1	Millwood (1–2)	Trachsel (1-1)	Wilson (2)	–	6–2
9	April 10	8:05 pm	@ Rangers	5 – 4	Wright (1–0)	Bradford (0–1)	Wilson (3)	15,560	6–3
10	April 11	7:10 pm	@ Rays	10 – 5	Reyes (1-1)	Sarfate (2–1)		12,146	6–4
11	April 12	7:10 pm	@ Rays	3 – 2	Bradford (1-1)	Wheeler (0–1)	Sherrill (5)	19,295	7–4
12	April 13	1:40 pm	@ Rays	6 – 2	Niemann (1–0)	Burres (1-1)		16,748	7–5
13	April 14	7:05 pm	Blue Jays	4 – 3	Albers (2–0)	McGowan (0–1)	Sherrill (6)	11,510	8–5
14	April 15	7:05 pm	Blue Jays	11 – 3	Marcum (2–0)	Trachsel (1–2)		15,017	8–6
15	April 16	7:05 pm	White Sox	3 – 1	Contreras (1-1)	Loewen (0–1)	Jenks (6)	12,080	8–7
16	April 17	7:05 pm	White Sox	6 – 5 (10)	Sherrill (1–0)	Logan (1-1)		13,676	9–7
17	April 18	7:05 pm	Yankees	8 – 2	Cabrera (1–0)	Hughes (0–3)		40,653	10–7
18	April 19	7:05 pm	Yankees	6 – 0	Burres (2–1)	Kennedy (0–2)	Johnson (1)	41,776	11–7
19	April 20	1:35 pm	Yankees	7 – 1	Pettitte (3–1)	Trachsel (1–3)		37,501	11–8
20	April 22	10:10 pm	@ Mariners	4 – 2	Rhodes (1–0)	Guthrie (0–2)	Putz (2)	17,780	11–9
21	April 23	10:10 pm	@ Mariners	3 – 2	Cabrera (2–0)	Rowland-Smith (0–1)	Sherrill (7)	16,823	12–9
22	April 24	10:10 pm	@ Mariners	8 – 7	Bradford (2–1)	Green (1-1)	Sherrill (8)	16,727	13–9
–	April 25	8:11 pm	@ White Sox	Postponed (rain) Rescheduled for April 26					
23	April 26	1:05 pm	@ White Sox	5 – 1	Burres (3–1)	Danks (2-2)	Sherrill (9)	23,043	14–9
24	April 26	7:05 pm	@ White Sox	6 – 5	Jenks (2–0)	Bierd (0–1)		34,757	14–10
25	April 27	2:05 pm	@ White Sox	6 – 1	Contreras (2-2)	Guthrie (0–3)		29,756	14–11
--	April 28	2:05 pm	@ White Sox	Suspended (rain) To be completed on August 25					
26	April 29	7:05 pm	Rays	7 – 4	Olson (1–0)	Hammel (2-2)	Sherrill (10)	11,588	15–11
27	April 30	7:05 pm	Rays	8 – 1	Sonnanstine (4–1)	Albers (2–1)		11,944	15–12

May

#	Date	Time	Opponent	Score	Win	Loss	Save	Attendance	Record
28	May 1	12:35 pm	Rays	4 – 2	Garza (1–0)	Burres (3–2)	Percival (6)	16,456	15–13
29	May 2	10:05 pm	@ Angels	4 – 3	Guthrie (1–3)	Weaver (2–4)	Sherrill (11)	41,515	16–13
30	May 3	3:45 pm	@ Angels	3 – 1	Garland (4–3)	Cabrera (2–1)	Rodríguez (12)	37,601	16–14
31	May 4	3:35 pm	@ Angels	6 – 5	Saunders (6–0)	Trachsel (1–4)	Rodríguez (13)	39,273	16–15
32	May 5	10:05 pm	@ Athletics	2 – 1	Devine (3–0)	Johnson (0–1)		10,128	16-16
33	May 6	10:05 pm	@ Athletics	4 – 2	Duchscherer (3–1)	Burres (3-3)	Casilla (1)	11,492	16–17
34	May 7	3:35 pm	@ Athletics	6 – 5	Braden (1–0)	Cormier (0–1)		15,235	16–18
35	May 8	8:10 pm	@ Royals	4 – 1	Cabrera (3–1)	Hochevar (2-2)		11,781	17–18
36	May 9	8:10 pm	@ Royals	7 – 4	Trachsel (2–4)	Meche (2–4)	Sherrill (12)	21,873	18-18
37	May 10	7:10 pm	@ Royals	6 – 5	Olson (2–0)	Tomko (1–4)	Sherrill (13)	15,808	19–18
38	May 11	2:10 pm	@ Royals	4 – 0	Bannister (4-4)	Burres (3–4)		18,635	19-19
39	May 13	7:05 pm	Red Sox	5 – 4	Guthrie (2–3)	Beckett (4–3)	Sherrill (14)	38,768	20–19
40	May 14	3:05 pm	Red Sox	6 – 3	Cabrera (4–1)	Hansen (0–2)	Sherrill (15)	28,939	21–19
41	May 16	7:05 pm	Nationals	5 – 3	Olson (3–0)	Hill (0–1)	Sherrill (16)	29,266	22–19
42	May 17	7:05 pm	Nationals	6 – 5	Burres (4-4)	Pérez (1–4)	Sherrill (17)	32,662	23–19
43	May 18	1:35 pm	Nationals	2 – 1	Lannan (4-4)	Guthrie (2–4)	Rauch (10)	33,745	23–20
44	May 20	7:05 pm	@ Yankees	12 – 2	Cabrera (5–1)	Mussina (6–4)		51,617	24–20
45	May 21	7:05 pm	@ Yankees	8 – 0	Rasner (3–0)	Olson (3–1)		50,682	24–21
46	May 22	7:05 pm	@ Yankees	2 – 1	Rivera (2–1)	Johnson (0–2)		49,452	24–22
47	May 23	7:10 pm	@ Rays	2 – 0	Garza (3–1)	Guthrie (2–5)	Percival (14)	13,635	24–23
48	May 24	6:10 pm	@ Rays	11 – 4	Jackson (3-3)	Trachsel (2–5)		30,445	24-24
49	May 25	1:40 pm	@ Rays	5 – 4	Percival (1–0)	Sherrill (1-1)		17,762	24–25
50	May 26	1:35 pm	Yankees	6 – 1	Olson (4–1)	Rasner (3–1)		34,928	25-25
51	May 27	7:05 pm	Yankees	10 – 9	Albers (3–1)	Hawkins (1-1)		24,030	26–25
52	May 28	7:05 pm	Yankees	4 – 2	Pettitte (5-5)	Guthrie (2–6)	Rivera (13)	24,791	26-26
53	May 30	7:05 pm	Red Sox	5 – 2 (13)	Timlin (3-3)	Bradford (2-2)	Papelbon (15)	46,199	26–27
54	May 31	7:05 pm	Red Sox	6 – 3	Aardsma (2–1)	Cormier (0–2)	Papelbon (16)	48,281	26–28

June

#	Date	Time	Opponent	Score	Win	Loss	Save	Attendance	Record
55	June 1	1:35 pm	Red Sox	9 – 4	Colón (3–0)	Burres (4–5)		45,031	26–29
56	June 2	7:05 pm	Red Sox	6 – 3	Johnson (1–2)	Okajima (1-1)	Sherrill (18)	25,711	27–29
57	June 3	8:10 pm	@ Twins	5 – 3	Liz (1–0)	Slowey (2–5)	Sherrill (19)	18,802	28–29
58	June 4	8:10 pm	@ Twins	7 – 5	Bonser (3–6)	Cabrera (5–2)	Nathan (16)	22,057	28–30
59	June 5	1:10 pm	@ Twins	3 – 2	Olson (5–1)	Baker (2–1)	Sherrill (20)	19,621	29–30
60	June 6	7:07 pm	@ Blue Jays	6 – 5	Sarfate (3–1)	Benítez (0–1)	Sherrill (21)	23,649	30-30
61	June 7	1:07 pm	@ Blue Jays	9 – 5	Guthrie (3–6)	Burnett (5–6)		25,122	31–30
62	June 8	1:07 pm	@ Blue Jays	5 – 4	Halladay (8–5)	Albers (3–2)	Ryan (13)	25,365	31-31
63	June 10	7:05 pm	@ Red Sox	10 – 6	Sarfate (4–1)	Okajima (1–2)		37,858	32–31
64	June 11	7:05 pm	@ Red Sox	6 – 3	Colón (4–1)	Olson (5–2)	Papelbon (19)	38,130	32-32
65	June 12	7:05 pm	@ Red Sox	9 – 2	Lester (5–3)	Guthrie (3–7)		38,139	32–33
66	June 13	7:05 pm	Pirates	9 – 6	Burres (5-5)	Osoria (3–2)	Sherrill (22)	47,305	33-33
67	June 14	7:05 pm	Pirates	8 – 7	Sherrill (2–1)	Capps (0–2)		32,432	34–33
68	June 15	1:35 pm	Pirates	5 – 4	Capps (1–2)	Sherrill (2-2)		31,107	34-34
69	June 17	7:05 pm	Astros	6 – 5	Johnson (2-2)	Brocail (2-2)	Sherrill (23)	21,535	35–34
70	June 18	7:05 pm	Astros	2 – 1	Bradford (3–2)	Valverde (4–2)		21,112	36-34
71	June 19	7:05 pm	Astros	7 – 5	Burres (6–5)	Chacón (2–3)	Sherrill (24)	31,480	37–34
72	June 20	8:05 pm	@ Brewers	8 – 5	Cormier (1–2)	Suppan (4–5)	Sherrill (25)	36,526	38–34
73	June 21	7:05 pm	@ Brewers	3 – 2	McClung (5–3)	Cabrera (5–3)	Torres (11)	42,521	38–35
74	June 22	2:05 pm	@ Brewers	7 – 3	Parra (7–2)	Olson (5–3)	Torres (12)	43,517	38–36
75	June 24	8:05 pm	@ Cubs	7 – 5	Guthrie (4–7)	Marshall (0–1)	Sherrill (26)	41,537	39–36
76	June 25	8:05 pm	@ Cubs	7 – 4	Lilly (8–5)	Albers (3-3)	Wood (20)	40,754	39–37
77	June 26	2:20 pm	@ Cubs	11 – 4	Liz (2–0)	Marquis (6–4)		41,670	40–37
78	June 27	7:35 pm	@ Nationals	4 – 2	Hanrahan (4–2)	Cabrera (5–4)	Rauch (16)	35,830	40–38
79	June 28	7:10 pm	@ Nationals	9 – 1	Olson (6–3)	Lannan (4–9)	Cormier (1)	39,479	41–38
80	June 29	1:35 pm	@ Nationals	3 – 2 (12)	Hanrahan (5–2)	Sherrill (2–3)		39,824	41–39
81	June 30	7:05 pm	Royals	6 – 5 (11)	Mahay (4–0)	Bradford (3-3)	Soria (22)	15,289	41–40

July

#	Date	Time	Opponent	Score	Win	Loss	Save	Attendance	Record
82	July 1	7:05 pm	Royals	7 – 5	Liz (3–0)	Hochevar (5–6)	Sherrill (27)	19,756	42–40
83	July 2	7:05 pm	Royals	5 – 2	Cabrera (6–4)	Meche (6–9)		17,909	43–40
84	July 3	7:05 pm	Royals	10 – 7	Peralta (1–2)	Loewen (0–2)	Soria (23)	16,782	43–41
85	July 4	4:35 pm	Rangers	10 – 4	Guthrie (5–7)	Padilla (10–5)		21,363	44–41
86	July 5	7:05 pm	Rangers	5 – 3	Feldman (3-3)	Cormier (1–3)	Wilson (20)	19,006	44–42
87	July 6	1:35 pm	Rangers	11 – 10	Millwood (6–4)	Liz (3–1)	Wilson (21)	22,276	44–43
88	July 8	7:07 pm	@ Blue Jays	7 – 6	Ryan (2–3)	Johnson (2–3)		23,276	44-44
89	July 9	7:07 pm	@ Blue Jays	9 – 8	Burnett (9–8)	Olson (6–4)	Ryan (17)	22,365	44–45
90	July 10	7:07 pm	@ Blue Jays	6 – 5	Camp (2–1)	Sherrill (2–4)		22,279	44–46
91	July 11	7:05 pm	@ Red Sox	7 – 3	Burres (7–5)	Buchholz (2–4)	Sherrill (28)	37,779	45–46
92	July 12	7:05 pm	@ Red Sox	12 – 1	Wakefield (6-6)	Liz (3–2)		37,539	45–47
93	July 13	1:35 pm	@ Red Sox	2 – 1	Matsuzaka (10–1)	Cabrera (6–5)	Papelbon (28)	37,344	45–48
All-Star Break
94	July 17	7:05 pm	Tigers	6 – 5	Rogers (7–6)	Olson (6–5)	Jones (18)	23,224	45–49
95	July 18	7:05 pm	Tigers	7 – 4	Guthrie (6–7)	Galarraga (7–4)	Sherrill (29)	29,111	46–49
96	July 19	7:05 pm	Tigers	11 – 10 (10)	Sherrill (3–4)	Dolsi (1–4)		31,525	47–49
97	July 20	1:35 pm	Tigers	5 – 1	Verlander (8–9)	Burres (7–6)		23,278	47–50
98	July 21	7:05 pm	Blue Jays	8 – 3	Liz (4–2)	Litsch (8–7)		12,772	48–50
99	July 22	7:05 pm	Blue Jays	10 – 8	Carlson (2–1)	Cabrera (0–1)	Ryan (19)	15,184	48–51
100	July 23	7:05 pm	Blue Jays	5 – 1	Burnett (11–9)	Guthrie (6–8)			48–52
101	July 24	12:35 pm	Blue Jays	7 – 1	Halladay (12–7)	Cabrera (6-6)		23,329	48–53
102	July 25	7:05 pm	Angels	6 – 5	Saunders (13–5)	Burres (7-7)	Rodríguez (43)	27,999	48–54
103	July 26	7:05 pm	Angels	11 – 6	Garland (9–6)	Liz (4–3)		21,819	48–55
104	July 27	1:35 pm	Angels	5 – 2	Olson (7–5)	Santana (11–5)	Sherrill (30)	23,365	49–55
105	July 28	7:05 pm	@ Yankees	13 – 4	Guthrie (7–8)	Mussina (13–7)		54,120	50–55
106	July 29	7:05 pm	@ Yankees	7 – 6	Cabrera (7–6)	Rasner (5–8)		54,241	51–55
107	July 30	1:05 pm	@ Yankees	13 – 3	Chamberlain (4–3)	Sarfate (4–2)		54,296	51–56

August

#	Date	Time	Opponent	Score	Win	Loss	Save	Attendance	Record
108	August 1	10:10 pm	@ Mariners	10 – 5	Olson (8–5)	Washburn (5–10)		28,114	52–56
109	August 2	10:10 pm	@ Mariners	3 – 1	Guthrie (8-8)	Hernández (7-7)		30,502	53–56
110	August 3	4:10 pm	@ Mariners	8 – 4	Putz (3–4)	Cabrera (7-7)		33,334	53–57
111	August 4	10:05 pm	@ Angels	6 – 5	Rodríguez (1–2)	Sherrill (3–5)		41,902	53–58
112	August 5	10:05 pm	@ Angels	3 – 0	Waters (1–0)	Garland (10–7)	Sherrill (31)	44,027	54–58
113	August 6	3:35 pm	@ Angels	9 – 4	Santana (13–5)	Olson (8–6)		40,130	54–59
114	August 8	7:05 pm	Rangers	9 – 1	Guthrie (9–8)	Mendoza (3–5)		33,351	55–59
115	August 9	7:05 pm	Rangers	9 – 0	Cabrera (8–7)	Padilla (12–6)		30,914	56–59
116	August 10	1:35 pm	Rangers	15 – 7	Harrison (4–2)	Bierd (0–2)		26,878	56–60
117	August 11	7:05 pm	@ Indians	13 – 8	Mujica (1-1)	Cherry (0–1)		23,408	56–61
118	August 12	7:05 pm	@ Indians	7 – 5	Pérez (2-2)	Johnson (2–4)	Lewis (2)	21,143	56–62
119	August 13	7:05 pm	@ Indians	6 – 1	Guthrie (10–8)	Reyes (3–2)		21,299	57–62
120	August 14	7:05 pm	@ Indians	11 – 6	Cabrera (1-1)	Pérez (2–3)		22,140	58–62
121	August 15	7:05 pm	@ Tigers	11 – 2	Cormier (2–3)	Robertson (7–9)		40,546	59–62
122	August 16	7:05 pm	@ Tigers	5 – 3	Verlander (9–13)	Sarfate (4–3)	Rodney (4)	41,727	59–63
123	August 17	1:05 pm	@ Tigers	16 – 8	Cabrera (2–1)	Fossum (2–1)		40,586	60–63
124	August 18	7:05 pm	Red Sox	6 – 3	Lester (12–4)	Guthrie (10–9)	Papelbon (33)	40,429	60–64
125	August 19	7:05 pm	Red Sox	7 – 2	Matsuzaka (15–2)	Cabrera (8-8)		48,515	60–65
126	August 20	7:05 pm	Red Sox	11 – 6	Waters (2–0)	Buchholz (2–9)		33,364	61–65
127	August 22	7:05 pm	Yankees	9 – 4	Veras (4–2)	Walker (1-1)	Rivera (29)	45,543	61–66
128	August 23	7:05 pm	Yankees	5 – 3	Pavano (1–0)	Guthrie (10-10)	Rivera (30)	48,817	61–67
129	August 24	1:35 pm	Yankees	8 – 7	E. Ramírez (4–1)	Walker (1–2)	Rivera (31)		61–68
130	August 25	6:05 pm	White Sox	4 – 3 (14)	Castillo (1–0)	H. Ramírez (0–1)	Cherry (1)	17,367	62–68
131	August 25	7:05 pm	White Sox	4 – 3	Richard (2-2)	Waters (2–1)	Jenks (26)	20,707	62–69
132	August 26	7:05 pm	White Sox	8 – 3	Floyd (14–6)	Burres (7–8)		15,398	62–70
133	August 27	7:05 pm	White Sox	11 – 3	Liz (5–3)	Danks (10–7)		15,736	63–70
134	August 29	7:10 pm	@ Rays	14 – 3	Kazmir (10–6)	Guthrie (10–11)		21,439	63–71
135	August 30	7:10 pm	@ Rays	10 – 9	Wheeler (3–5)	Cherry (0–2)		34,805	63–72
136	August 31	1:40 pm	@ Rays	10 – 4	Shields (12–8)	Burres (7–9)		32,379	63–73

September

#	Date	Time	Opponent	Score	Win	Loss	Save	Attendance	Record
137	September 1	7:05 pm	@ Red Sox	7 – 4	Byrd (10–11)	Olson (8–7)	Papelbon (35)	37,565	63–74
138	September 2	7:05 pm	@ Red Sox	14 – 2	Lester (13–5)	Liz (5–4)		37,710	63–75
139	September 3	1:35 pm	@ Red Sox	5 – 4	Masterson (5–4)	Miller (0–1)		37,373	63–76
140	September 5	7:05 pm	Athletics	11 – 2	Braden (5–3)	Waters (2-2)		14,984	63–77
–	September 6	1:35 pm	Athletics	Cancelled (rain) Was not made up					
141	September 6	7:05 pm	Athletics	5 – 1	G. Smith (7–14)	Cabrera (8–9)		21,553	63–78
142	September 8	7:05 pm	Indians	14 – 3	Olson (9–7)	Carmona (8–6)		11,181	64–78
143	September 9	7:05 pm	Indians	6 – 1	Sowers (3–8)	Liz (5-5)		14,900	64–79
144	September 10	7:05 pm	Indians	7 – 1	Lewis (7–1)	Waters (2–3)		12,438	64–80
145	September 11	7:05 pm	Indians	6 – 3	Cormier (3-3)	Jackson (0–3)	Miller (1)	12,526	65–80
–	September 12	7:05 pm	Twins	Postponed (rain) Rescheduled for September 13					
146	September 13	1:05 pm	Twins	12 – 2	Baker (9–4)	Cabrera (8–10)		21,712	65–81
147	September 13	7:05 pm	Twins	12 – 6	Korecky (2–0)	Olson (9–8)		21,712	65–82
148	September 14	1:35 pm	Twins	7 – 3	Liz (6–5)	Blackburn (10–9)		18,559	66–82
149	September 16	7:07 pm	@ Blue Jays	2 – 0	Waters (3-3)	Marcum (9–7)		25,746	67–82
150	September 17	7:07 pm	@ Blue Jays	8 – 7	Carlson (7–1)	Mickolio (0–1)	Ryan (30)	24,546	67–83
151	September 18	7:07 pm	@ Blue Jays	3 – 2	Litsch (12–8)	Olson (9-9)	Ryan (31)	29,063	67–84
152	September 19	7:05 pm	@ Yankees	3 – 2	Pavano (4–1)	Liz (6-6)	M. Rivera (37)	54,136	67–85
153	September 20	1:05 pm	@ Yankees	1 – 0	M. Rivera (6–5)	Miller (0–2)		54,662	67–86
154	September 21	8:05 pm	@ Yankees	7 – 3	Pettitte (14-14)	Waters (3–4)		54,610	67–87
155	September 22	5:05 pm	Rays	4 – 2	Balfour (6–2)	Cherry (0–3)	Wheeler (12)	12,489	67–88
156	September 23	1:05 pm	Rays	5 – 2	Shields (14–8)	Olson (9–10)	Wheeler (13)	15,215	67–89
157	September 23	7:05 pm	Rays	7 – 5	Niemann (2–1)	Walker (1–3)	Howell (3)	15,215	67–90
158	September 24	7:05 pm	Rays	11 – 6	Jackson (13–11)	Burres (7–10)	Miller (2)	13,632	67–91
159	September 26	7:05 pm	Blue Jays	3 – 0	Richmond (1–3)	Waters (3–5)		17,716	67–92
160	September 27	7:05 pm	Blue Jays	2 – 1 (7)	Bass (4-4)	Parrish (1-1)		18,378	68–92
161	September 28	1:35 pm	Blue Jays	10 – 1	Litsch (13–9)	Guthrie (10–12)		19,554	68–93

== Player stats ==
=== Batting ===
==== Starters by position ====
Note: Pos = Position; G = Games played; AB = At bats; H = Hits; Avg. = Batting average; HR = Home runs; RBI = Runs batted in

Pos	Player	G	AB	H	Avg.	HR	RBI
C	Ramón Hernández	133	463	119	.257	15	65
1B	Kevin Millar	145	531	124	.234	20	72
2B	Brian Roberts	155	611	181	.296	9	57
3B	Melvin Mora	135	513	146	.285	.23	104
SS	Juan Castro	54	151	31	.205	2	16
RF	Nick Markakis	157	595	182	.306	20	87
CF	Adam Jones	132	477	129	.270	9	57
LF	Luke Scott	148	475	122	.257	23	65
DH	Aubrey Huff	154	598	182	.304	32	108

==== Other batters ====
Note: G = Games played; AB = At bats; H = Hits; Avg. = Batting average; HR = Home runs; RBI = Runs batted in

Player	G	AB	H	Avg.	HR	RBI
Jay Payton	127	338	82	.243	7	41
Guillermo Quiróz	56	134	25	.187	2	14
Alex Cintrón	61	133	38	.286	1	10
Freddie Bynum	40	112	20	.179	0	8
Lou Montañez	38	112	33	.295	3	14
Brandon Fahey	58	106	24	.226	0	12
Oscar Salazar	34	81	23	.284	5	15
Luis Hernández	36	79	19	.241	0	3
Omir Santos	11	10	1	.100	0	0
Eider Torres	8	9	2	.222	0	0
Scott Moore	4	8	1	.125	1	1

=== Pitching ===
==== Starting pitchers ====
Note: G = Games pitched; IP = Innings pitched; W = Wins; L = Losses; ERA = Earned run average; SO = Strikeouts

Player	G	IP	W	L	ERA	SO
Jeremy Guthrie	30	190.2	10	12	3.63	120
Daniel Cabrera	30	180.0	8	10	5.25	95
Garrett Olson	26	132.2	9	10	6.65	83
Radhames Liz	17	84.1	6	6	6.72	57

==== Other pitchers ====
Note: G = Games pitched; IP = Innings pitched; W = Wins; L = Losses; ERA = Earned run average; SO = Strikeouts

Player	G	IP	W	L	ERA	SO
Brian Burres	31	129.2	7	10	6.04	63
Chris Waters	11	64.2	3	5	5.01	33
Steve Trachsel	10	39.2	2	5	8.39	16
Adam Loewen	7	21.1	0	2	8.02	14
Brian Bass	5	21.0	1	0	4.71	13

==== Relief pitchers ====
Note: G = Games pitched; W = Wins; L = Losses; SV = Saves; ERA = Earned run average; SO = Strikeouts

Player	G	W	L	SV	ERA	SO
George Sherrill	57	3	5	31	4.73	58
Jamie Walker	59	1	3	0	6.87	24
Dennis Sarfate	57	4	3	0	4.74	86
Jim Johnson	54	2	4	1	2.23	38
Chad Bradford	47	3	3	0	2.45	13
Lance Cormier	45	3	3	1	4.02	46
Randor Bierd	29	0	2	0	4.91	25
Matt Albers	28	3	3	0	3.49	26
Alberto Castillo	28	1	0	0	3.81	23
Fernando Cabrera	22	2	1	0	5.40	31
Rocky Cherry	18	0	3	1	6.35	15
Greg Aquino	9	0	0	0	12.54	9
Kam Mickolio	9	0	1	0	5.87	8
Bob McCrory	8	0	0	0	15.63	5
Jim Miller	8	0	2	0	1.17	8
Ryan Bukvich	4	0	0	0	6.75	5
Alfredo Simón	4	0	0	0	6.23	8

== Farm system ==
Level	Team	League	Manager
AAA	Norfolk Tides	International League	Gary Allenson
AA	Bowie Baysox	Eastern League	Brad Komminsk
A	Frederick Keys	Carolina League	Richie Hebner and Tommy Thompson
A	Delmarva Shorebirds	South Atlantic League	Ramón Sambo
A-Short Season	Aberdeen IronBirds	New York–Penn League	Gary Kendall
Rookie	Bluefield Orioles	Appalachian League	Orlando Gómez
Rookie	GCL Orioles	Gulf Coast League	Jesús Alfaro
