= Elder =

An elder is a person who is of greater age or authority.

Elder or elders may refer to:

== Positions ==
=== Administrative ===
- Elder (administrative title), a position of authority
  - North American Indigenous elder, a person who has and transmits cultural and philosophical knowledge
    - Haudenosaunee Clan Mother
  - Australian Aboriginal elder, one who has gained recognition as a custodian of knowledge and lore, often a leader in administrative matters

=== Religious ===
- "The Elder", author of the Johannine epistles 2 John and 3 John in the New Testament
- Elder (Christianity), a person valued for their wisdom and, in some churches and denominations, holding an administrative or oversight role
  - Elder (Methodist), an ordained minister with responsibilities to preach and teach
  - Elder (Anglican), a learned minister with responsibilities to teach and/or innovate
  - Elder (Latter Day Saints), a priesthood office in the Melchizedek priesthood
- Thero or Elder, an honorific term for senior Buddhist nuns and monks

== Places ==
Antarctica

- Elder Bluff, Palmer Land
- Elder Glacier, Victoria Land
- Elder Peak, Oates Land
- Mount Elder, South Shetland Islands

Australia

- Elder Range, part of the Flinders Ranges in South Australia
- Electoral district of Elder, South Australia
- Elder Park, Adelaide, South Australia

Canada

- Elder Island, Nunavut

United States

- Elder, Georgia
- Elder Township, Cambria County, Pennsylvania

== In entertainment ==
- Elder (band), a rock/metal band from Boston
- Elders of the Universe, supervillains appearing in Marvel Comics
- Mole Man or Harvey Rupert Elder, a fictional character in Marvel Comics
- The Elder, an independent film adaptation of the 1981 Kiss concept album Music from "The Elder
- "The Elder" (Star Wars: Visions), an episode of Star Wars: Visions

== People ==
- Elder (given name), a list of people
- Elder (surname), a list of people
- Élder (footballer) (born 1976), a Brazilian former footballer Élder Alencar Machado de Campos
- List of people known as the Elder or the Younger

== Plants ==
- Box elder, Acer negundo, North American species of maple
- Ground elder (Aegopodium podagraria), common edible garden perennial, widely considered a weed
- Yellow elder (Tecoma stans), flowering perennial shrub in the trumpet vine family
- Sambucus, also known as elder or elderberry, a genus of fast-growing shrubs or small trees
- Marsh elder or Iva, a genus of wind-pollinated plants in the daisy family

== Other uses ==
- Elder (constructor), a former racing car constructor
- The Elders (organization), an international non-governmental organisation of statesmen, peace activists, and human rights advocates
- USS Elder (AN-20), a US Navy World War II anti-submarine net laying ship
- Elder High School, Cincinnati, Ohio
- Elders Limited, an Australian agribusiness company
- Elder Pharmaceuticals, a company headquartered in Mumbai, India
- An old English word for udder

== See also ==
- Council of Elders (disambiguation)
- Eldership (disambiguation)
- Eider (disambiguation)
- Alder (disambiguation)
- Elderly, adjective for people with ages nearing or surpassing the life expectancy of human beings
