= House of Elders =

House of Elders could refer to:

- House of Elders (Afghanistan)
- House of Elders (Somaliland)

== See also ==
- Elder (disambiguation)
- Eldership (disambiguation)
- Council of Elders (disambiguation)
