= Steens, Mississippi =

Unincorporated community in Mississippi, United States

- Unincorporated community
- Location within the state of Mississippi Steens (the United States)
- Coordinates: 33°33′48″N 88°18′58″W
- Country: United States
- State: Mississippi
- County: Lowndes
- Elevation: 194 ft (59 m)
- Time zone: UTC-6 (Central (CST))
  - Summer (DST): UTC-5 (CDT)
- ZIP code: 39766
- Area code: 662
- GNIS feature ID: 678264

Steens, (also known as Jamisons Mill), is an unincorporated community in Lowndes County, Mississippi. Steens is located northeast of Columbus. The ZIP Code for Steens is 39766.

== History ==
Steens is located adjacent to Luxapallila Creek and is located on the former Southern Railway. In 1838, Robert Jamison founded a grist mill, store, and smithy along Luxapallila Creek near the present site of Steens. In addition, he built multiple covered bridges in the area. In 1900, the population was 26. The community once had a cotton gin and exported large amounts of lumber, fertilizer, and cotton seed.

A post office operated under the name Steenston from 1884 to 1903 and under the names Steens starting in 1903.

The Caledonia Combined Cycle Plant, a Tennessee Valley Authority power plant, is located on 125 acres of land near Steens.

The Steens soil series is named for the community.

== Notable person ==
- Bob McCrory, former relief pitcher for the Baltimore Orioles
