= Eider (disambiguation) =

Eider are large seaducks in the genus Somateria, including:

- Common eider (Somateria mollissima)
- Spectacled eider (Somateria fischeri)
- King eider (Somateria spectabilis)

Eider may also refer to:

- Steller's eider (Polysticta stelleri) of the duck subfamily Merginae
- Eider (river), in Schleswig-Holstein, Germany
- Eider (Amt), a collective municipality in Dithmarschen, Schleswig-Holstein, Germany
- Eider (brand), Korean company

Surnames

- Max Eider (born Peter Millson; died 2025), English guitarist and songwriter
- Shimon Eider (1938–2007), American Orthodox rabbi and posek

Forenames

- Éider Arévalo (born 1993), Colombian racewalker
- Eider Torres (born 1983), baseball player from Venezuela

Fictional characters

- Eider Duck, a Disney character who is Donald Duck's paternal uncle
- Sir Eider McDuck, a Disney character who is an ancestor of Scrooge McDuck and Donald Duck
- Aunt Eider, a Disney character who is the aunt of both Scrooge McDuck and John D. Rockerduck

Ships

- USFS Eider, a motor schooner in commission in the U.S. Bureau of Fisheries from 1919 to 1940, U.S. Fish and Wildlife Service from 1940 to 1949, and U.S. Geological Survey from 1949 to 1954

== See also ==
- Eder (disambiguation)
