= Garrett Olson =

American baseball player (born 1983)

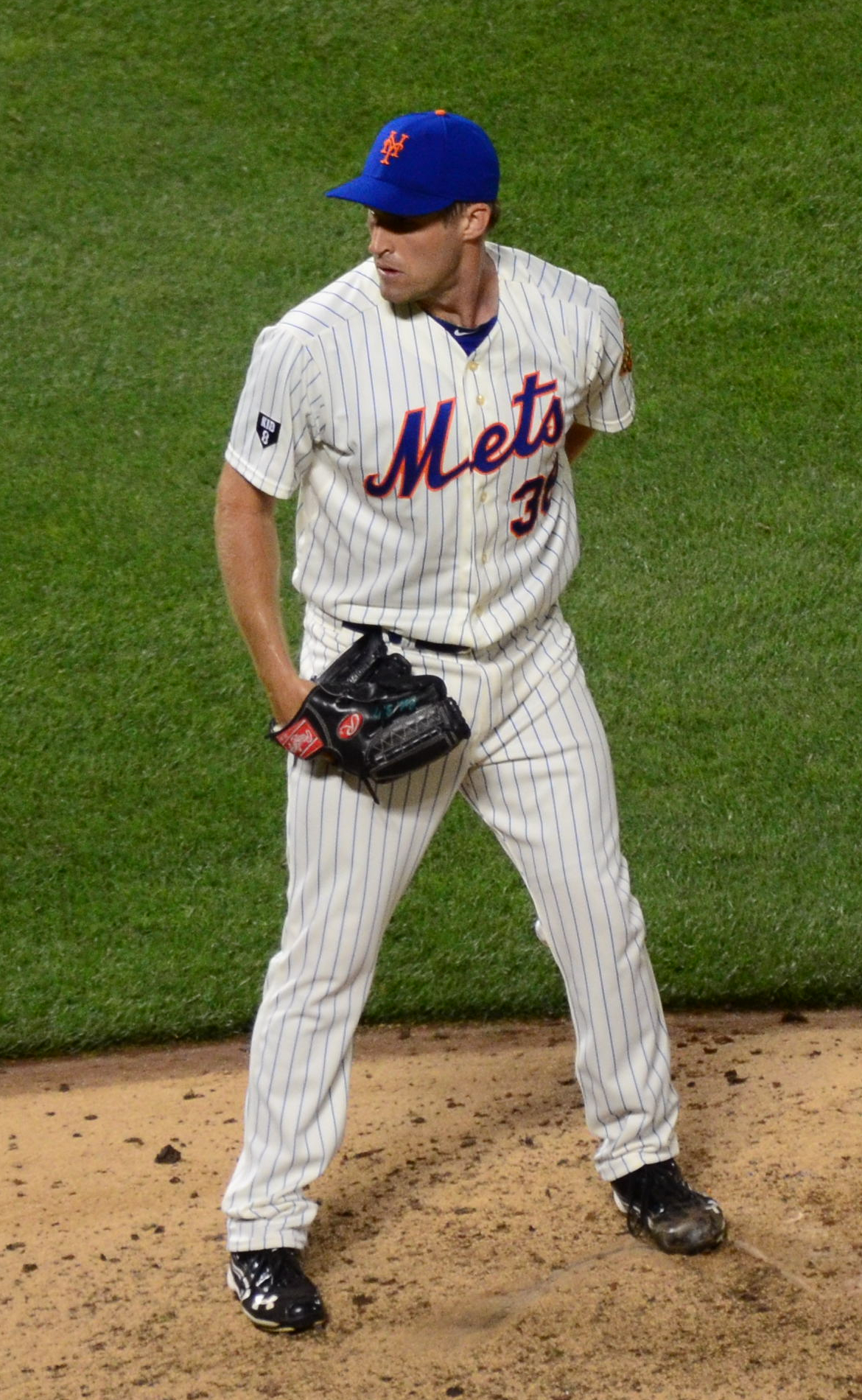
- Olson with the New York Mets
- Pitcher
- Born: October 18, 1983 (age 43); Fresno, California, U.S.
- Batted: Right Threw: Left

Professional debut
- MLB: July 4, 2007, for the Baltimore Orioles
- KBO: March 31, 2013, for the Doosan Bears

Last appearance
- MLB: August 8, 2012, for the New York Mets
- KBO: July 10, 2013, for the Doosan Bears

MLB statistics
- Win–loss record: 14–22
- Earned run average: 6.26
- Strikeouts: 193

KBO statistics
- Win–loss record: 1–1
- Earned run average: 6.52
- Strikeouts: 35
- Stats at Baseball Reference

Teams
- Baltimore Orioles (2007–2008); Seattle Mariners (2009–2010); Pittsburgh Pirates (2011); New York Mets (2012); Doosan Bears (2013)

Garrett Andrew Olson (born October 18, 1983) is an American former professional baseball pitcher. He played in Major League Baseball (MLB) for the Baltimore Orioles, Seattle Mariners, Pittsburgh Pirates and New York Mets and in the KBO League for the Doosan Bears.

== Early life ==
=== High school ===
Olson attended Buchanan High School in Clovis, California. He played for the Anchorage Bucs in the Alaska Baseball League in 2004, going 7–0 with a 0.88 ERA, and was a Summer League First-Team All-American starting pitcher.

=== College ===
He attended Cal Poly-San Luis Obispo for college, where in his last year he was 12–4 with a 2.71 ERA. In 2005 with the Mustangs, he was an All-Big West Conference First Team starting pitcher honors recipient.

== Professional career ==
=== Baltimore Orioles ===
Olson was drafted by the Baltimore Orioles as a sandwich pick between the first and second rounds (48th overall) of the 2005 MLB draft. During the 2005 season, he played mostly with the Aberdeen IronBirds, moving to the Frederick Keys in August. In 2006, he advanced to the Double-A Bowie Baysox, and was named the Baltimore Orioles Minor League Player of the Year. Olson was invited to the All-Star Futures Game.

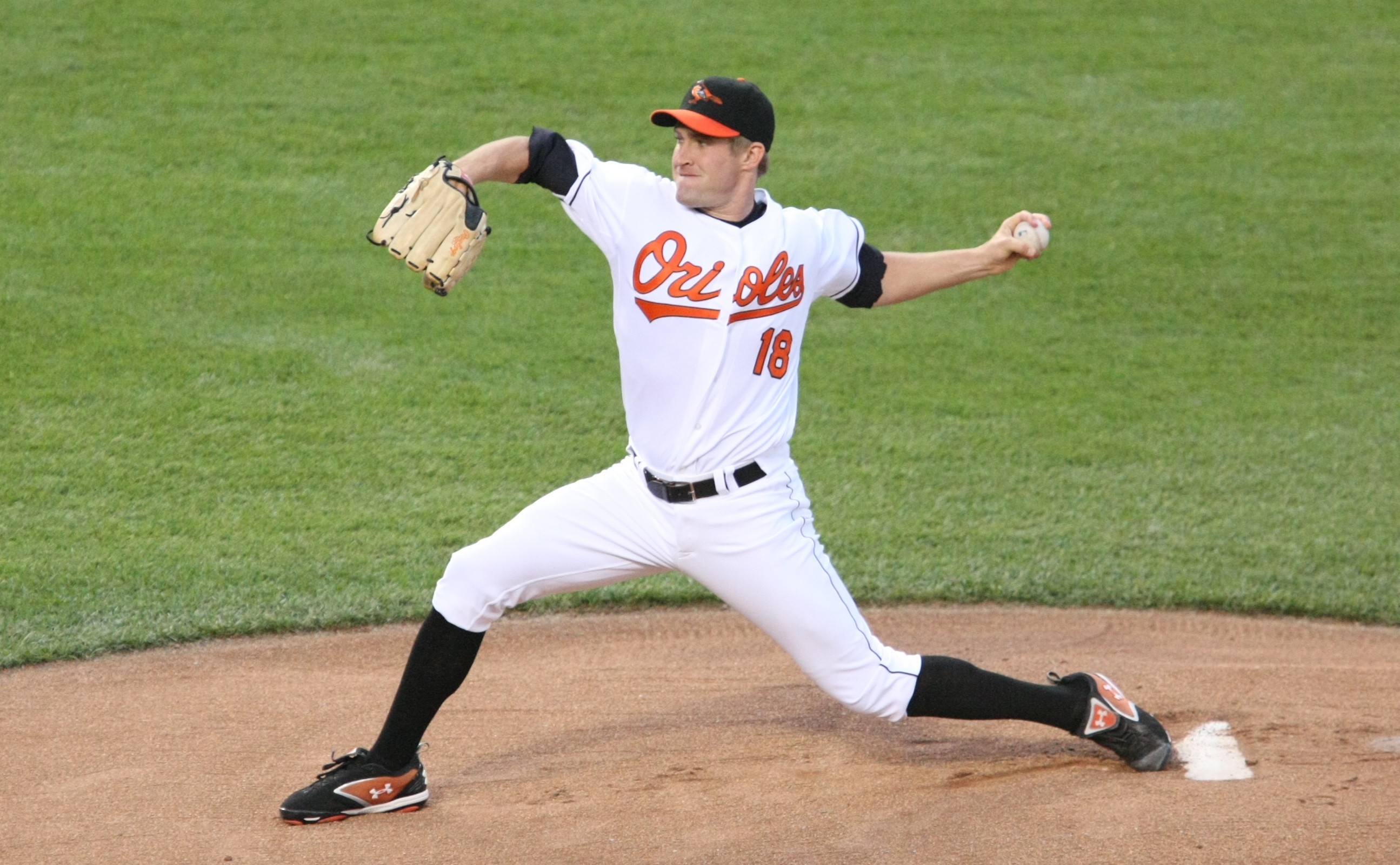
Olson pitching for the Orioles in 2008.

Through 2007, Olson was 21–17 with a 2.95 ERA, and averaged 7.37 hits and 8.82 strikeouts per nine innings during his minor league career. He was mentioned, but did not participate in the 2007 All-Star Futures Game, representing the United States team.

Olson was promoted from the Triple-A Norfolk Tides to take the place of injured Orioles starter Steve Trachsel, and he made his major league debut on Independence Day of 2007 against the Chicago White Sox. He would have earned the win in his debut, but he only pitched 4 1/3 innings, falling two outs shy of the five innings required to qualify for a win. He earned his first career win in his next start, also against the White Sox, on July 15, giving up two runs in 5 1/3 innings, both on solo home runs by Jermaine Dye, and the Orioles went on to win 5–3.

Olson committed his first career error in his debut on July 4. After allowing the first batter he faced in his career, left fielder Andy González, to reach base via a walk, he made a throwing error on a pickoff attempt, allowing Gonzalez to reach second base. His first career strikeout came three batters later, as Paul Konerko was called out on a 2–2 pitch.

On September 1, 2007, Olson made a start at Fenway Park against the Boston Red Sox, where he was the opposing pitcher in Clay Buchholz's no-hitter. On June 28, 2008, Olson earned his first career hit vs. the Washington Nationals against Jesús Colomé in the sixth inning.

He went to 3–0 on 8% of all batters he faced in 2008, the highest percentage in the majors.

=== Seattle Mariners ===
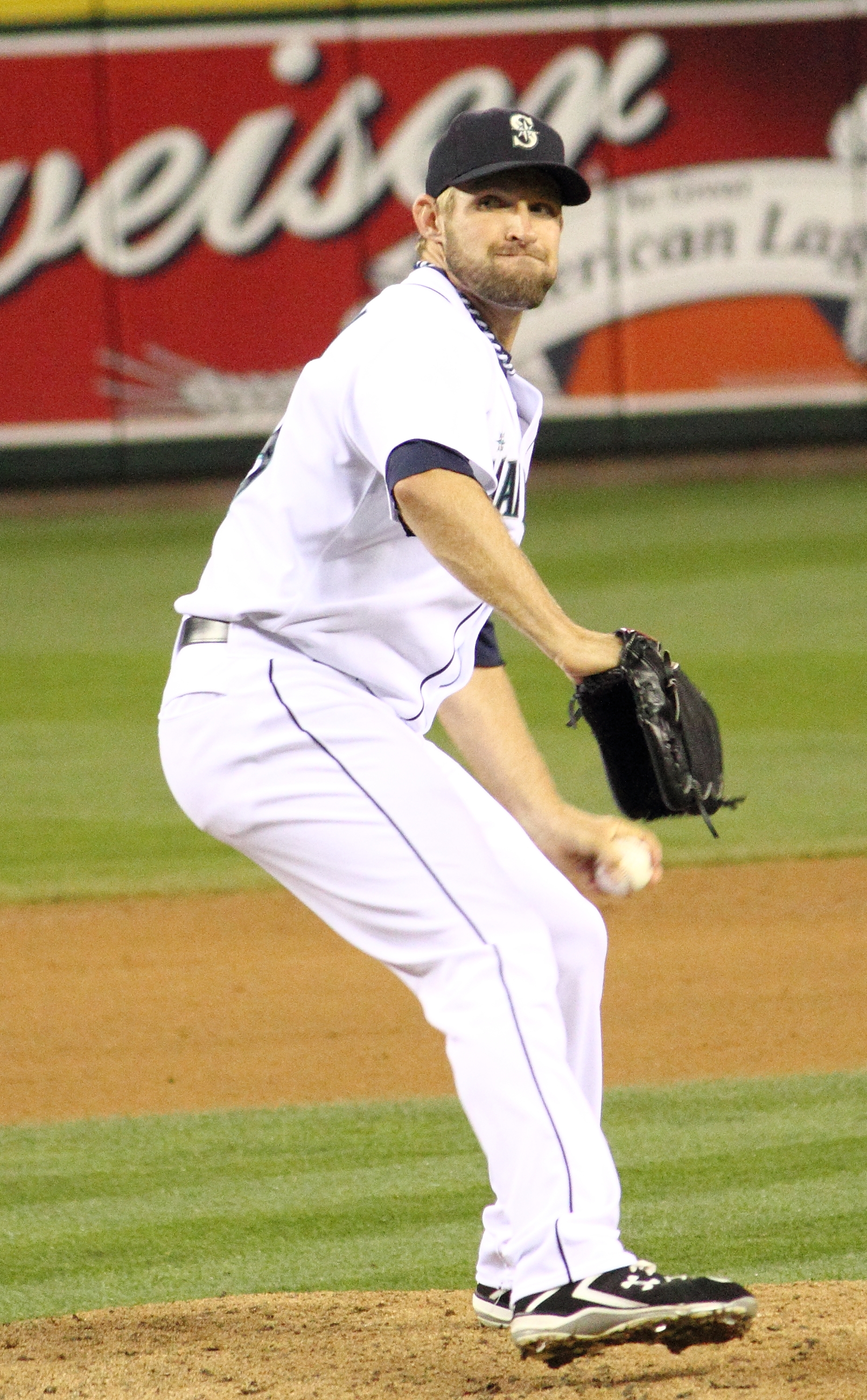
Olson pitching for the Mariners in 2010.

On January 18, 2009, Olson was traded to the Chicago Cubs with a minor-leaguer for Félix Pie. Just 10 days later, he was traded along with Ronny Cedeño to the Seattle Mariners for Aaron Heilman. On April 1, 2009, Olson was optioned to Triple-A Tacoma to begin the season. He was called up on May 6 because of an injury to relief pitcher Shawn Kelley. Olson soon took the rotation spot from teammate Chris Jakubauskas.

He compiled a 3.72 ERA in 12 relief appearances covering 19 1/3 innings. In 11 starts, he is 3–5 with a 6.49 ERA through August 10. Eventually, Olson was moved the bullpen to become a reliever. He stated that he felt comfortable in both roles. Olson was again optioned to Triple-A Tacoma on August 20 to clear roster space for Infielder Bill Hall.

On September 13, Olson was called up again to the Mariners, marking his third stint with the team in 2009. With Tacoma, Olson went 2–3 with a 4.94 ERA and notched the Rainiers' only playoff win against the Sacramento River Cats.

=== Pittsburgh Pirates ===
On March 18, 2011, the Mariners placed Olson on waivers. He was later claimed off waivers by the Pittsburgh Pirates. He was designated for assignment on April 17. He cleared waivers and was sent outright to Triple-A Indianapolis Indians on April 20. He became a free agent following the season on November 2.

=== New York Mets ===
On December 13, 2011, Olson signed a minor league contract with the New York Mets. Olson began the year with Triple-A Buffalo. On August 7, 2012, Olson was called up from Triple-A to replace the injured Tim Byrdak. Olson made his Mets debut on August 8, pitching one third of an inning, giving up four earned runs against the Miami Marlins. Olson was designated for assignment on August 11 to create room on the roster for Johan Santana. He cleared waivers and was sent outright to Triple-A Buffalo Bisons on August 14. In October 2012, Olson elected minor league free agency.

=== Oakland Athletics ===
On October 24, 2012, Olson signed with the Oakland Athletics. He was released on March 16, 2013.

=== Doosan Bears ===
On March 19, 2013, Olson signed with the Doosan Bears in the Korea Baseball Organization. He was released from Doosan in July 2013.

== Personal life ==
He currently resides in Carson City, Nevada with his wife and daughter. He majored in mechanical engineering in college and he works for Baker Hughes in Minden, Nevada as a mechanical engineer.
