= Council of Elders =

Council of Elders may refer to:

- Council of Elders (Malaysia), a group of eminent Malaysians advising the seventh Mahathir cabinet
- Council of Elders (A Series of Unfortunate Events), a fictional organization
- Council of Elders of the Bundestag (Germany), a joint deliberative body; likewise in e.g. the Landtag of Mecklenburg-Vorpommern
- Council of Five Elders, a form of government in feudal Japan
- Council of Ancients, the upper house of the French Directory, a.k.a. Council of Elders
- Teip Council of Elders, a council within the Chechen tribal organization Teip
- Roman Senate, from the Latin "senatus" meaning "council of elders"
- The privy council in several African kingdoms, such as the Oyo Mesi
- The ruling council of the planet Krypton in the Superman comic book and film series
- Yerevan City Council, whose direct translation is the 'Yerevan Council of Elders'
- Council of Elders (Samia-Bugwe), the legislature of the Samia-Bugwe Kingdom, a traditional monarchy in Uganda

== See also ==
- Elder (disambiguation)
- Eldership (disambiguation)
- COE (disambiguation)
- House of Elders (disambiguation)
