= The Elder =

- Promotional poster
- Directed by: Seb Hunter
- Written by: Seb Hunter; Gene Simmons (concept)
- Produced by: Seb Hunter; Owen Oakeshott
- Music by: Kiss; Crater (Incidental music)
- Running time: 85 minutes
- Country: United Kingdom
- Language: English
- Budget: £30,000

The Elder is an unreleased independent film adaptation of the 1981 Kiss concept album, Music from "The Elder". The film's plot derives from that concept, devised by Kiss co-founder Gene Simmons.

The film was being produced by British author and musician Seb Hunter and partner Owen Oakeshott. The film was not acknowledged or sanctioned by Kiss or their management.

As of 2025 the film remains unreleased.

== Premise ==
In April 2014, a new, synthetic variant of the bird-flu virus (H5N1) was 'accidentally' released into South East England by American pharmaceutical giant Blackwell Corp, as a consequence of which, 99.9% of the local population perished.

Ten years after this unprecedented catastrophe, in the continued absence of any centralised infrastructure, Blackwell (Steve Webster) himself now personally oversees the remaining 0.1% with his own, heavily armed, roving Priesthood.

The Citizenship's highest honour is to become one of the Chosen - the latest of whom, just a boy (Billy Mackie), who must be escorted from the West Country across the deserted English countryside by Father Morpheus (Owen Oakeshott), to Blackwell's laboratory on the Isle of Wight.

But the English countryside is far from deserted, and Father Morpheus drinks much whiskey. He claims there's an alternative, but then he says many strange things. When there's no one left to ask, who exactly are you supposed to trust?

== Cast ==
The cast consisted of the following actors according to the official website.

- Owen Oakeshott as Father Morpheus
- David Knox-Williams as Father Cerberus
- Christopher Sciueref as Father Dedalus
- Billy Mackie as The Boy
- Megan West as Isabel
- Alastair Thomson Mills as Boris
- Reuben Hunter as The Young Boy
- Steve Webster as Mr. Blackwell

== Production ==
On November 16, 2011 it was announced that pre-production had begun on an independently produced adaptation of Music from “The Elder” . English author/musician Seb Hunter said that he was beginning to write a screenplay based upon Gene Simmons’ original concept and is producing the film himself alongside producer Owen Oakeshott. In order to finance the film, the producers have asked for donations from the public through The Elder official site. In return for a donation, the donor's name will appear in the film's credits. It is approximated that the overall budget for the film will be £30,000.

Mentorn Media have also begun work on a documentary titled, Exhuming the Elder which follows the independent filmmakers behind the scenes as they attempt to bring the Elder concept to fruition.
