= Eldership =

Eldership may refer to:

- Elder (administrative title), used in several countries and organizations to indicate a position of authority
- Eldership (Christianity), the governance of a local congregation by elders
- Elderships of Lithuania, the smallest Lithuanian administrative divisions
- Starostwo (Polish for "eldership"), a medieval Polish office granted by the king
- Starosta okruh (Ukrainian for "eldership"), a part of the territory of the territorial hromadas of Ukraine

== See also ==
- Council of Elders (disambiguation)
- Elder (disambiguation)
