= USS Elder =

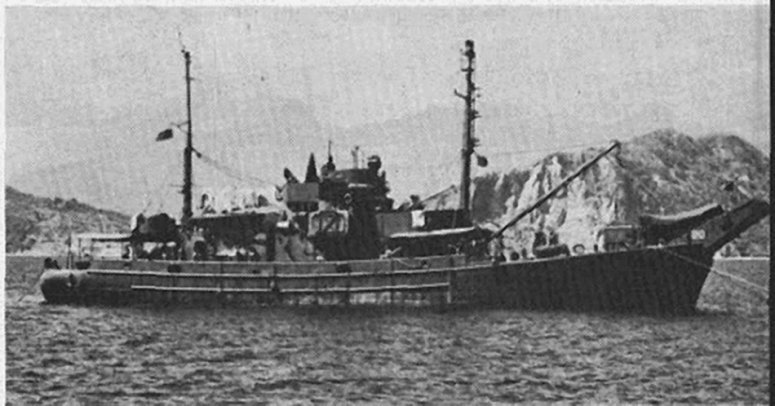

History

United States
- Name: USS Elder
- Namesake: A shrub or tree of the honeysuckle family
- Builder: Marietta Manufacturing Company, Point Pleasant, West Virginia
- Laid down: as Elder (YN-15), date unknown,
- Launched: 19 June 1941
- Commissioned: 15 December 1942 as USS Elder (YN-15)
- Decommissioned: 18 December 1959, in the 13th Naval District
- In service: 12 November 1941
- Reclassified: AN-20, 20 January 1944
- Stricken: date unknown
- Home port: Tiburon, California
- Honours and awards: one battle star for World War II service (Gilbert Islands operation)
- Fate: fate unknown

General characteristics
- Type: Aloe-class net laying ship
- Tonnage: 560 tons
- Displacement: 700 tons
- Length: 151 ft 8 in (46.23 m)
- Beam: 30 ft 6 in (9.30 m)
- Draft: 10 ft 6 in (3.20 m)
- Propulsion: Diesel, single propeller
- Speed: 15 knots
- Complement: 40 officers and enlisted
- Armament: one single 3 in (76 mm) dual purpose gun mount; three single 20 mm AA gun mounts; one y-gun

USS Elder (AN-20/YN-15) was an Aloe-class net laying ship which was assigned to serve the U.S. Navy during World War II with her protective anti-submarine nets.

== Built in West Virginia ==
Elder (YN-15) was launched 19 June 1941 by Marietta Manufacturing Company, Point Pleasant, West Virginia; and placed in service 12 November 1941. She was redesignated AN-20 on 20 January 1944.

== World War II service ==
Serving in the 1st Naval District Elder laid and tended nets at Boston, Massachusetts, until 15 March 1942, then sailed to Portland, Maine, to serve as controlling gate vessel in Hussey Sound. She was commissioned 15 December 1942.

Elder returned to Boston 25 June 1943, and sailed 8 August, for San Diego, California, Pearl Harbor, and Funafuti, Ellice Islands, arriving 15 November. She assembled, launched, and tended nets there, and after the capture of the Gilbert Islands, sailed to Tarawa in December for mooring and net operations off that island, Makin, and Abemama. Departing the Gilberts in February 1944 with LCT-247 in tow for Kwajalein, she laid and cared for nets in the Marshall Islands until the end of the year.

After an overhaul on the U.S. West Coast, Elder returned to the South Pacific Ocean to repair nets at the fleet base at Manus, arriving there 30 April 1945. The following month she got underway for Luzon, searching for and towing the disabled merchant tanker SS McKitterick Hills en route. She delivered the tanker to Mangarin Bay, Mindoro, then continued to Subic Bay for voyage repairs.

Elder remained in the Philippines for the rest of the war. She laid sonar buoy moorings to protect against Japanese submarines entering Subic Bay; made a sounding survey of North Channel between Corregidor and Bataan; and in September began plotting the position of known wrecks in Manila Harbor. In October she returned to Subic Bay to remove and salvage net defense.

=== End-of-war activity ===
Elder sailed back to Corregidor in November 1945 for a unique assignment. Until May 1946 she conducted diving operations in Caballo Bay to recover thousands of silver pesos, Philippine currency, which had been dumped in the bay to prevent its capture by the Japanese.

Remaining in the Philippines, Elder operated from her base at Subic Bay on a variety of assignments. She assisted in the decommissioning of small craft; maintained moorings; transported passengers and cargo between Philippine ports; and occasionally escorted small craft to Okinawa.

== Post-war activity ==
Elder returned to the U.S. West Coast 3 August 1948 for duty at the Naval Net Depot at Tiburon, California. On 23 May 1949 she sailed for Alaskan waters where she conducted buoy operations at Adak; carried a scientific party from Great Sitkin Island to Adak; and transported three Navy petty officers to service the weather station of Simeonoff Island. She returned to her base at Tiburon 13 October 1949.

== Fire aboard the vessel at sea ==
In 1950 Elder was ordered to the western Pacific Ocean, but on 11 March when a week out of Pearl Harbor, a serious fire broke out in the engine room. With all headway lost and no water pressure, Elder appeared doomed. But sound training and Navy "know-how," combined with determined courage in the ship's intrepid damage control parties, subdued the raging flames.

Her engines damaged beyond repair, the stricken net tender drifted helplessly for a week before assistance in the form of Comstock (LSD-19) and Piedmont (AD-17) arrived on 18 March. The next day Elder was taken in tow by Deliver (ARS-23) and began the long slow haul to Pearl Harbor.

== Korean War support ==
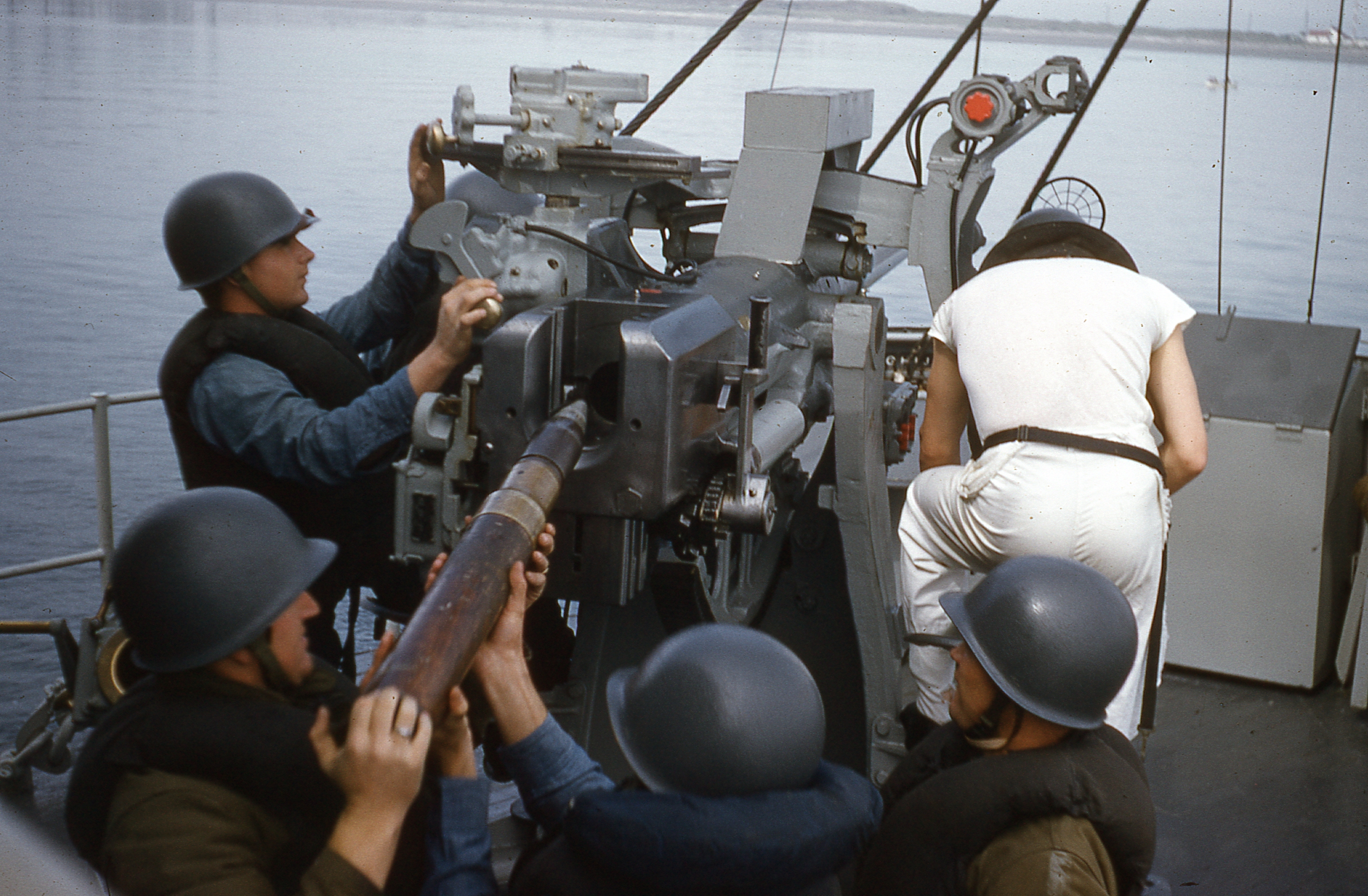
General Quarters Exercise Aboard the Elder, in 1953 or 1954

Her extensive repairs complete, Elder sailed from Pearl Harbor 26 January 1951 for net operations at Yokosuka, Japan, a key operating base in the Korean War. She returned to Tiburon 27 January 1952, and except for occasional cruises to Eniwetok, Kwajalein, and Guam for net and buoy operations, served on the west coast. In April 1954 she was assigned to the 13th Naval District for training duty with the harbor defense unit of the Pacific Northwest.

== Final decommissioning ==
She was decommissioned there 18 December 1959.

== Honors and awards ==
Elder received one battle star for World War II service because of her participation in the Gilbert Islands operation.
