= Randor Bierd =

Dominican baseball player (born 1984)

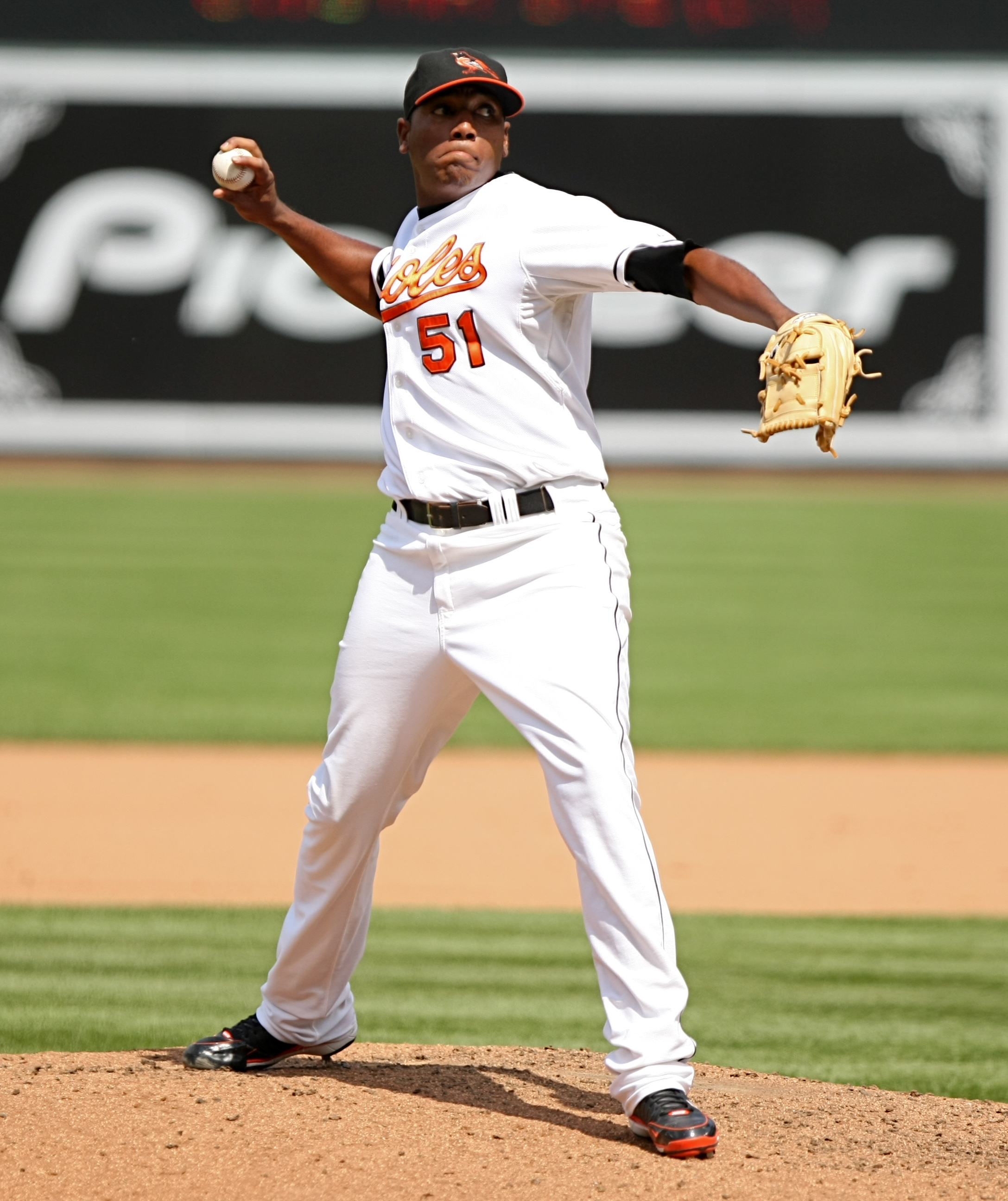
- Bierd pitching for the Baltimore Orioles on August 10, 2008.
- Relief pitcher
- Born: March 14, 1984 (age 42); Santo Domingo, Dominican Republic
- Batted: Right Threw: Right

MLB debut
- April 2, 2008, for the Baltimore Orioles

Last MLB appearance
- September 28, 2008, for the Baltimore Orioles

MLB statistics
- Win–loss record: 0–2
- Earned run average: 4.91
- Strikeouts: 25
- Stats at Baseball Reference

Teams
- Baltimore Orioles (2008)

Randor Bierd (born March 14, 1984) is a Dominican former professional baseball relief pitcher. He played in Major League Baseball (MLB) for the Baltimore Orioles.

== Career ==
=== Detroit Tigers ===
Bierd was originally signed by the Detroit Tigers as an undrafted free agent on June 3, 2003. Bierd's best season in the Tigers organization came in 2007, when he pitched for the Single-A West Michigan Whitecaps and the Double-A Erie SeaWolves. Pitching in a total of 42 games (three starts), Bierd went 4–3 with a 2.93 ERA.

=== Baltimore Orioles ===
On December 6, 2007, Bierd was selected by the Baltimore Orioles in the major league phase of the Rule 5 draft. Bierd made the Orioles 2008 opening day roster as a relief pitcher. On April 2, 2008, Bierd made his major league debut against the Tampa Bay Rays, and pitched two scoreless innings. On May 2, 2008, he was placed on the 15-day disabled list with a sore right shoulder. On July 19, Bierd was activated from the disabled list. In 29 games with the Orioles, he went 0–2 with a 4.91 ERA while striking out 25 batters in 36.2 innings pitched.

=== Boston Red Sox ===
On January 19, 2009, Bierd was traded to the Boston Red Sox for David Pauley. Bierd spent the 2009 baseball season with the Triple-A Pawtucket Red Sox, achieving a 3–1 record with a 4.55 ERA as both a starter and reliever.

On July 22, 2010, Bierd was released by the Red Sox. He spent the 2010–2011 offseason pitching winter baseball in the Dominican League for Leones del Escogido.

== Coaching career ==
Bierd was named as the pitching coach of the DSL Pirates for the 2019 season.

== See also ==
- Rule 5 draft results
