= Bob McCrory =

American baseball player (born 1982)

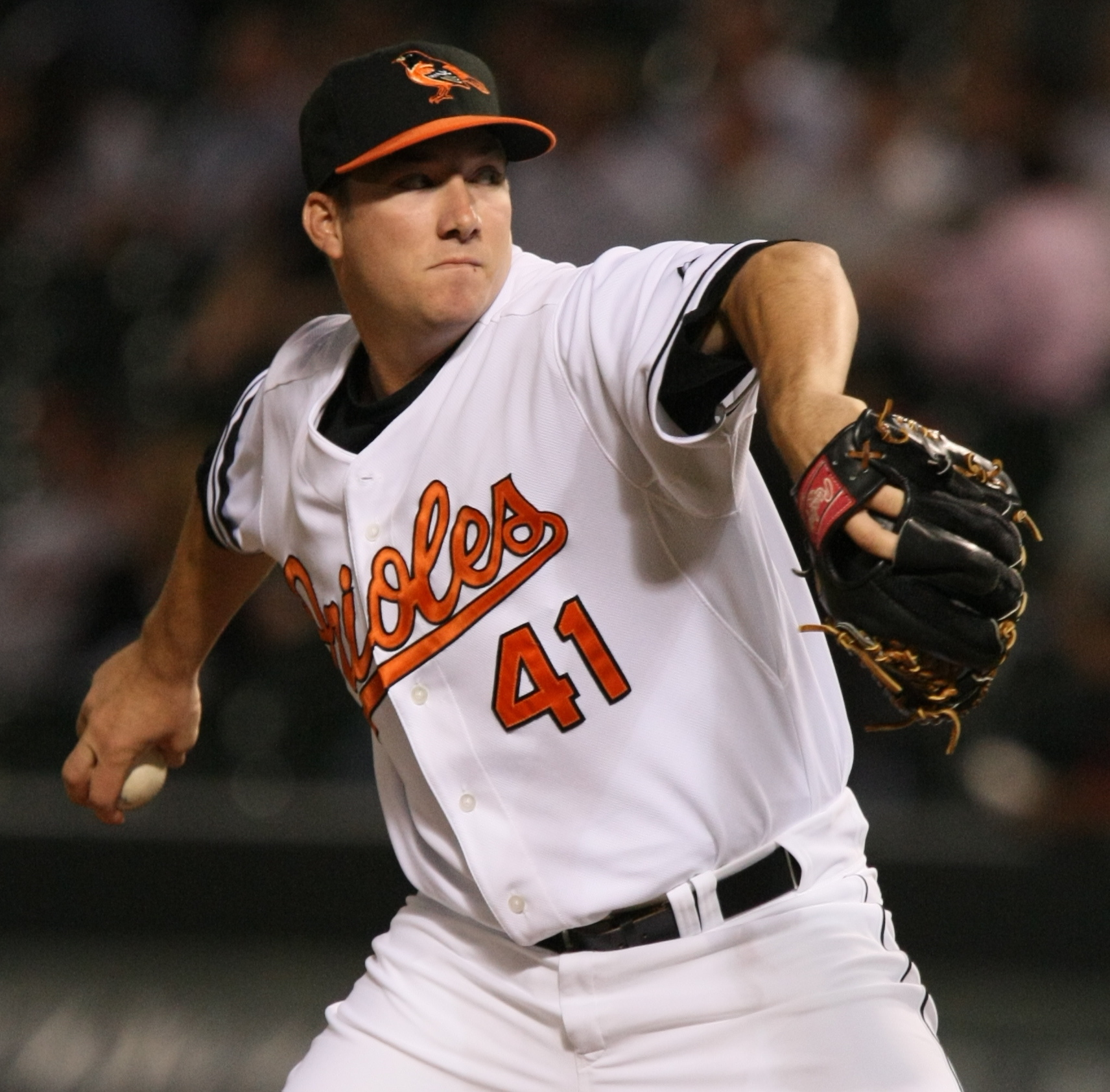
- McCrory with the Baltimore Orioles in 2008
- Relief pitcher
- Born: May 3, 1982 (age 42); Steens, Mississippi, U.S.
- Batted: Right Threw: Right

MLB debut
- April 30, 2008, for the Baltimore Orioles

Last MLB appearance
- September 21, 2009, for the Baltimore Orioles

MLB statistics
- Win–loss record: 0–0
- Earned run average: 16.46
- Strikeouts: 9
- Stats at Baseball Reference

Teams
- Baltimore Orioles (2008–2009)

Robert Glenn McCrory (born May 3, 1982) is a former baseball relief pitcher. He played for the Baltimore Orioles.

== Career ==
=== Baltimore Orioles ===
McCrory was drafted by the Houston Astros in the 11th round (337th overall) in the 2000 Major League Baseball draft. However, he did not sign with the Astros, choosing instead to play college ball at the University of Southern Mississippi. He had a superb senior season in 2003, making 15 starts in 18 games and had a 10–3 record with a 3.84 ERA. The Baltimore Orioles then drafted him in that same year in the fourth round (104th overall) of the 2003 Major League Baseball draft. In his four years in the minors, he has had anterior cruciate ligament reconstruction, and Tommy John surgery.

McCrory began the 2007 season for the Single-A Frederick Keys. As the closer for the Keys, he notched 14 saves in 22 games and also had a 1.23 ERA. On June 20, 2007, McCrory was promoted to the Double-A Bowie Baysox and finished the season there. He became the Baysox closer, notching 13 saves in another 22 games. Also, he had a 1–2 record with a 3.91 ERA. He went 2–1 with a 1.50 ERA and a league-leading five saves for the champion Phoenix Desert Dogs in the Arizona Fall League, allowing a league-best .103 batting average (4–39).

On October 23, 2007, the Orioles purchased McCrory's contract, protecting him from the Rule 5 draft. He made his major league debut April 30, 2008, against the Tampa Bay Rays, pitching a third of an inning and giving up four runs on two hits and two walks.

=== Chiba Lotte Marines ===
McCrory signed with the Chiba Lotte Marines in Japan on December 28, 2010, but did not play a game for the team before his retirement.
