= Rocky Cherry =

American baseball player (born 1979)

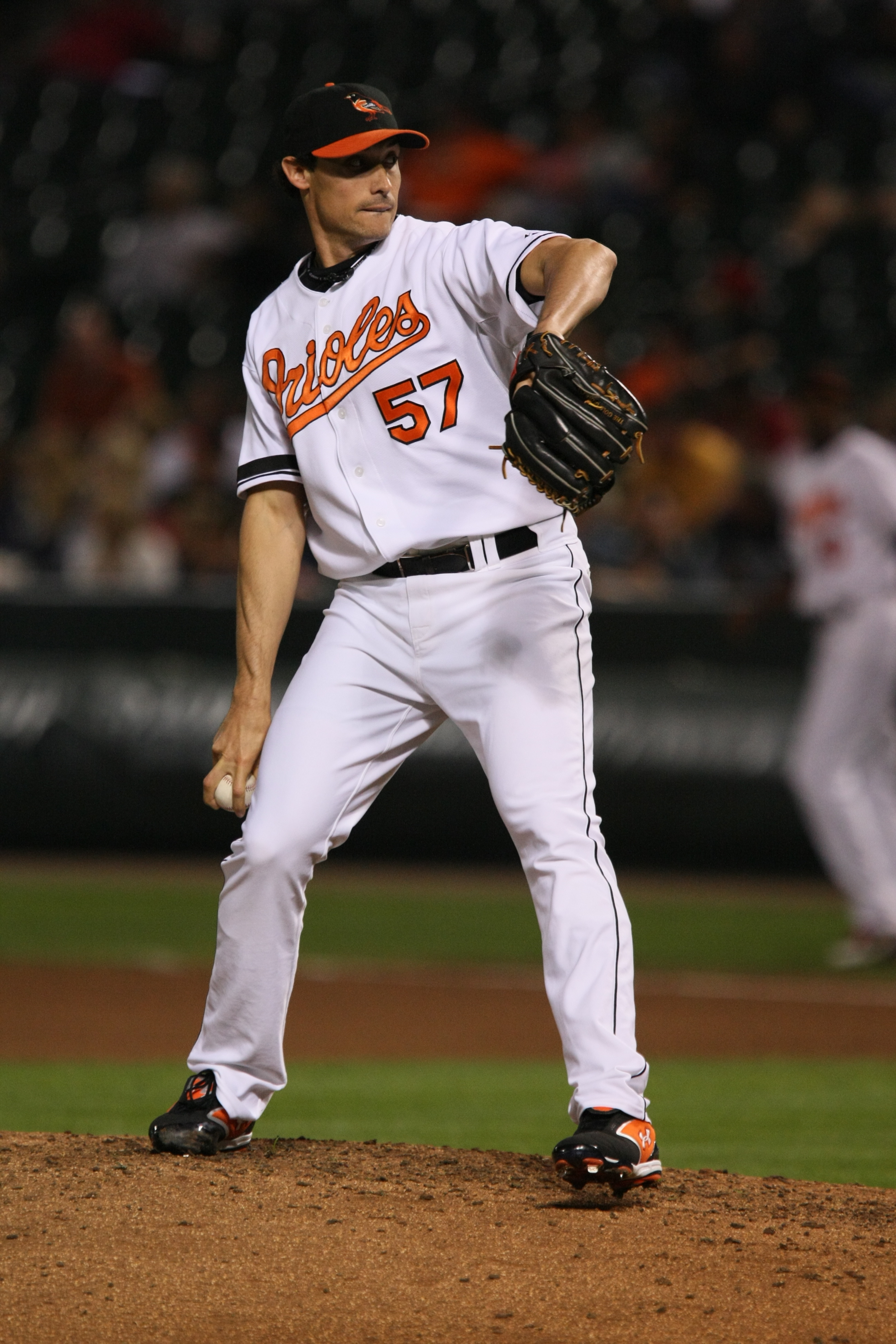
- Cherry pitching for the Baltimore Orioles on September 22, 2008.
- Relief pitcher
- Born: August 19, 1979 (age 47); Dallas, Texas, U.S.
- Batted: Right Threw: Right

MLB debut
- April 23, 2007, for the Chicago Cubs

Last MLB appearance
- September 24, 2008, for the Baltimore Orioles

MLB statistics
- Win–loss record: 1–4
- Earned run average: 5.77
- Strikeouts: 38
- Stats at Baseball Reference

Teams
- Chicago Cubs (2007); Baltimore Orioles (2007–2008)

Rocky Ty Cherry (born August 19, 1979) is an American former professional baseball pitcher. He played in Major League Baseball (MLB) for the Chicago Cubs and Baltimore Orioles from 2007 to 2008.

== Career ==
=== Amateur ===
Cherry pitched for the University of Oklahoma from 2000–2002. He was used mostly in relief his first season, but was a full-time starter by the time he finished at school. He had an overall record of 18–16 in 208 innings pitched. In 2000, he played collegiate summer baseball with the Brewster Whitecaps of the Cape Cod Baseball League.

=== Chicago Cubs ===
The Philadelphia Phillies chose Cherry in the 10th round (290th overall) of the 2001 MLB draft, but he did not sign at the time. The next year, the Chicago Cubs selected him in the 14th round (423rd overall) of the 2002 MLB draft, and he signed with them. He was a starter for his first three minor league seasons (2003–2005). Cherry's 2005 season ended after only three appearances for the West Tenn Diamond Jaxx of the Double-A Southern League, after which he had Tommy John surgery. When he returned to West Tenn in 2006, Cherry became a full-time reliever. He had a middle finger injury to his pitching hand in mid-July which also required surgery.

Cherry made his major league debut with the Cubs on April 23, 2007, against the Milwaukee Brewers, He allowed a game-winning home run in the 12th inning to Brewers first baseman Prince Fielder, and suffered the loss. Cherry earned his first big league win on May 1 against the Pittsburgh Pirates.

=== Baltimore Orioles ===
In August 2007, the Cubs traded Cherry and third baseman Scott Moore to the Orioles for starting pitcher Steve Trachsel. Cherry began 2008 on the 15-day disabled list with a shoulder strain. As of May 20, he was on rehab assignment to the Triple-A Norfolk Tides. He was the last visiting pitcher ever at the original Yankee Stadium while a member of the Orioles on September 21, 2008.

In December 2008, Cherry was selected by the New York Mets in the 2008 Rule 5 draft. He was released by the Mets on March 17, 2009, after the Orioles declined to take him back.

=== Boston Red Sox ===
On March 24, 2009, Cherry signed a minor league contract with the Boston Red Sox. He made 38 appearances for the Triple–A Pawtucket Red Sox, logging a 3–1 record and 2.57 ERA with 44 strikeouts over 63 innings of work. Cherry was released by the Red Sox organization on August 18.

=== San Diego Padres ===
On August 21, 2009, Cherry signed a minor league contract with the San Diego Padres. He made five appearances for the Triple–A Portland Beavers, struggling to an 0–1 record and 12.27 ERA with five strikeouts across 7 1/3 innings pitched. Cherry was granted free agency on November 9.

== See also ==
- Rule 5 draft results
