= Scott Moore (baseball) =

American baseball player (born 1983)

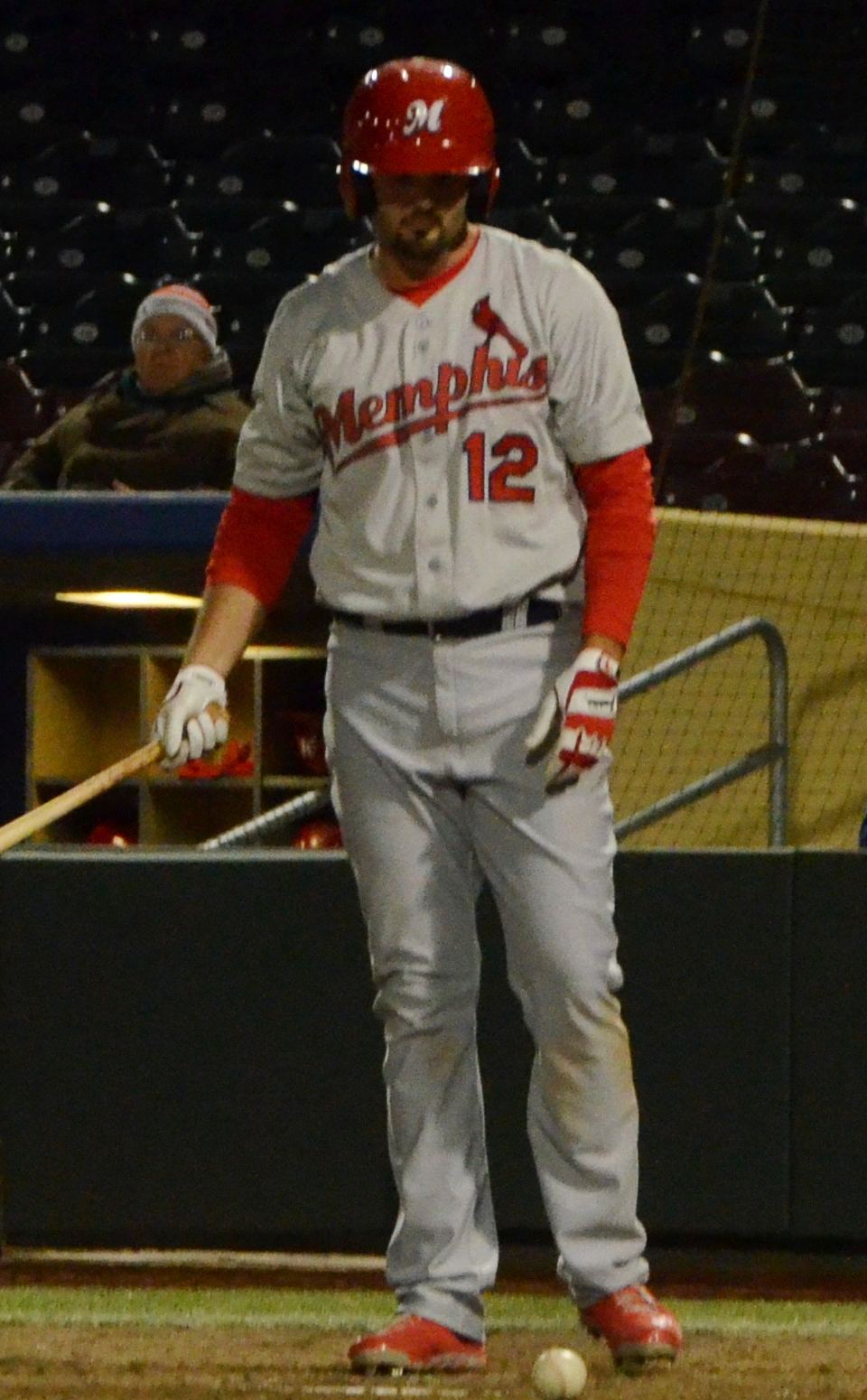
- Moore with the Memphis Redbirds
- Infielder
- Born: November 17, 1983 (age 42); Long Beach, California, U.S.
- Batted: Left Threw: Right

MLB debut
- September 4, 2006, for the Chicago Cubs

Last MLB appearance
- October 2, 2012, for the Houston Astros

MLB statistics
- Batting average: .242
- Home runs: 16
- Runs batted in: 53
- Stats at Baseball Reference

Teams
- Chicago Cubs (2006–2007); Baltimore Orioles (2007–2008, 2010); Houston Astros (2012)

Scott Alanboyd Moore (born November 17, 1983) is an American former professional baseball infielder. He played in Major League Baseball (MLB) for the Chicago Cubs, Baltimore Orioles and Houston Astros. He played with the St. Louis Cardinals organization until his release in May 2015.

== Professional career ==
=== Detroit Tigers ===
Moore was selected in the first round of the 2002 Major League Baseball draft as the eighth overall pick by the Detroit Tigers.

=== Chicago Cubs ===
On February 9, 2005, Moore was traded to the Chicago Cubs alongside Roberto Novoa and Bo Flowers in exchange for pitcher Kyle Farnsworth and a player to be named later. Moore made his major league debut on September 4, 2006, against the Pittsburgh Pirates, and was hit by a pitch in his only at-bat of the game in the second inning. On September 7, he hit his first major league home run against the Pirates in a 7–5 loss. He was called up again on July 20, 2007, to start at first base against the Arizona Diamondbacks after a suspended Derrek Lee and an injured Daryle Ward left the Cubs in need of a first baseman.

=== Baltimore Orioles ===
On August 31, 2007, Moore was traded from the Cubs to the Baltimore Orioles along with pitcher Rocky Cherry for starting pitcher Steve Trachsel.

Moore was designated for assignment on February 10, 2009 to make room for Ty Wigginton on the 40-man roster. Moore joined the Triple-A Norfolk Tides.

=== Second stint with the Chicago Cubs ===
On November 16, 2010, Moore signed a minor league contract with the Chicago Cubs. He played the 2011 season with the Triple-A Iowa Cubs, batting .295 with nine home runs and 53 RBI in 123 games.

=== Houston Astros ===
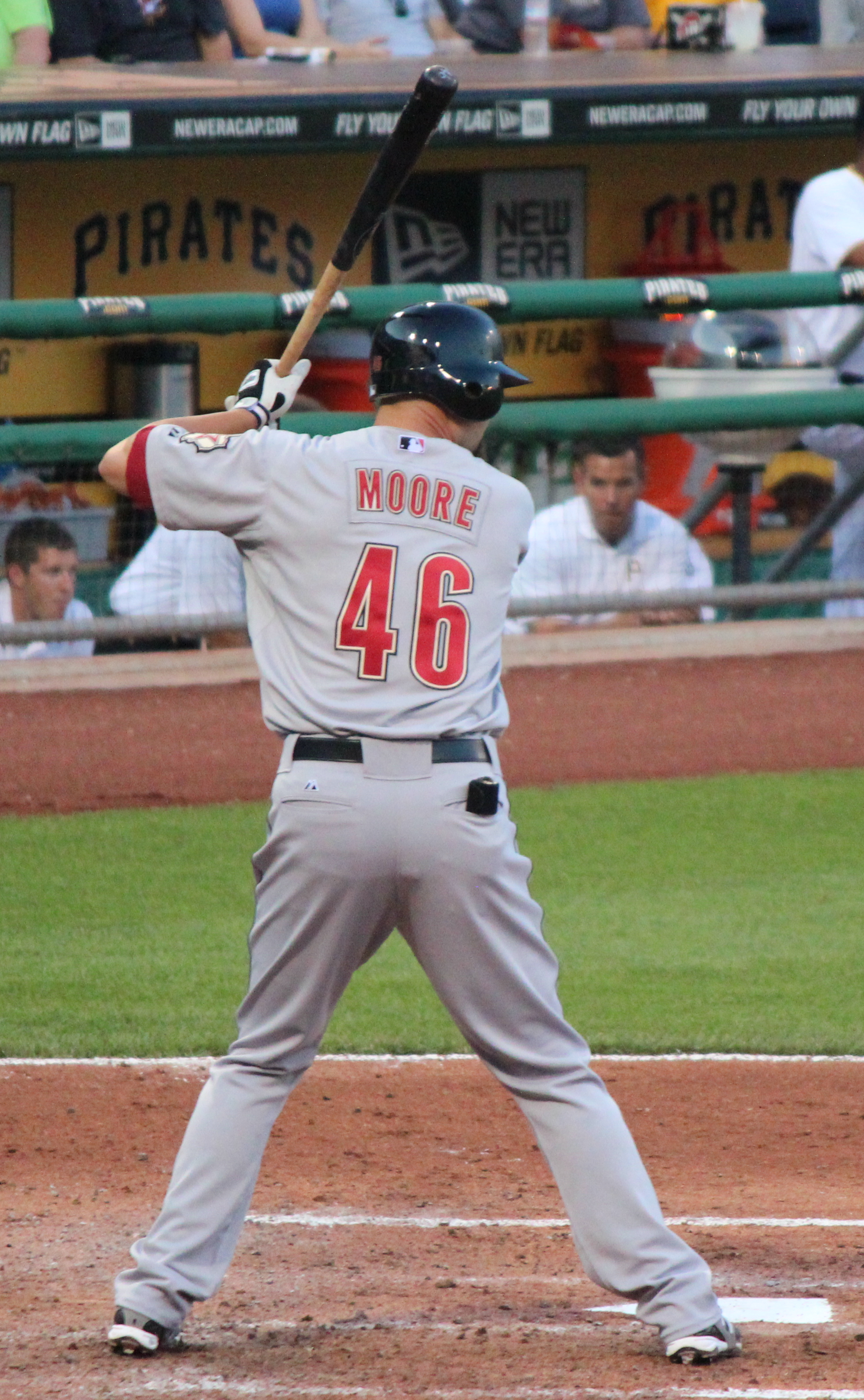
Moore during his tenure with the Houston Astros, in 2012

The Houston Astros signed Moore to a minor league contract on November 15, 2011. After beginning the year with the Triple-A Oklahoma City RedHawks, Moore was called up on June 26, and spent the rest of the season with the Astros. In 72 games with Houston, Moore hit .259 with nine home runs and 26 RBI.

=== Oakland Athletics ===
On November 29, 2012, Moore signed a minor league deal with the Oakland Athletics that included an invitation to Spring Training. Moore began the year with Triple-A Sacramento. In 80 games, he hit .276 with 11 home runs and 56 RBI before being released on July 19 and signing with the San Diego Padres later that day.

=== San Diego Padres ===
On July 19, 2013, Moore signed a minor league deal with the San Diego Padres and was assigned to Triple-A Tucson. In 39 games with Tucson, he hit .260 with three home runs and 10 RBI.

=== St. Louis Cardinals ===
On November 7, 2013, Moore signed a minor league deal with the St. Louis Cardinals. He also got an invitation to Spring Training for 2015 in Jupiter, Florida. He was released on May 18, 2015.
