= Eider Torres =

Venezuelan baseball player (born 1983)

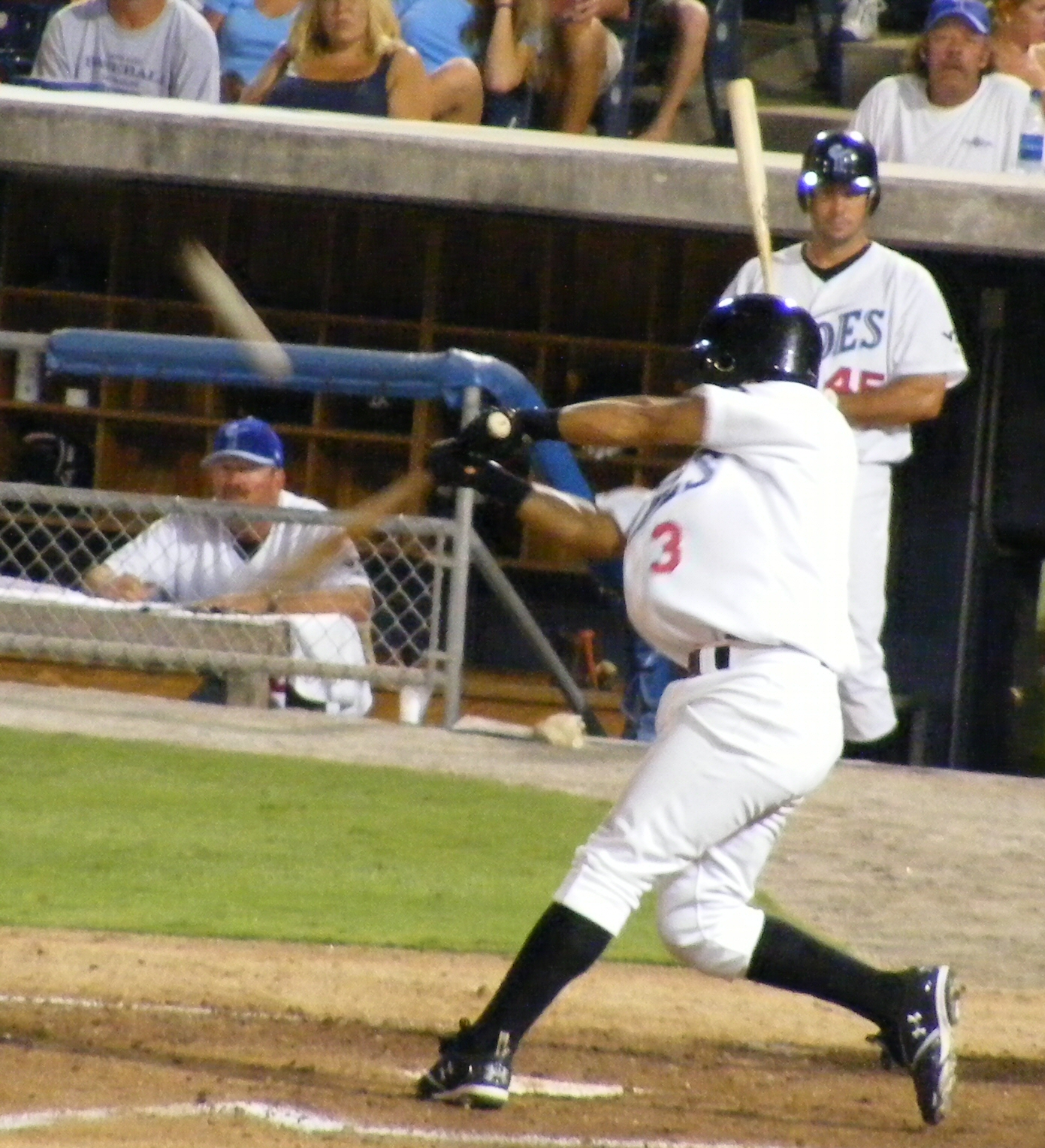
- Torres getting a hit for the Norfolk Tides against the Columbus Clippers
- Second baseman
- Born: January 16, 1983 (age 43); Maracaibo, Venezuela
- Batted: Switch Threw: Right

MLB debut
- April 26, 2008, for the Baltimore Orioles

Last MLB appearance
- May 7, 2008, for the Baltimore Orioles

MLB statistics
- Batting average: .222
- Home runs: 0
- Runs batted in: 0
- Stats at Baseball Reference

Teams
- Baltimore Orioles (2008)

Eider Lenina Torres Sandoval (born January 16, 1983) is a Venezuelan professional baseball coach and former second baseman. He played in Major League Baseball (MLB) for the Baltimore Orioles in 2008.

== Playing career ==
=== Cleveland Indians ===
From 2002 to 2006, Torres played in the Cleveland Indians farm system for the Burlington Indians, Mahoning Valley Scrappers, Kinston Indians, Akron Aeros, and Buffalo Bisons.

=== Baltimore Orioles ===
In 2007, Torres became a member of the Baltimore Orioles organization. He played in their minor league system for the Triple-A Norfolk Tides during the 2007 and 2008 seasons. On April 25, 2008, Torres' contract was purchased by Baltimore when Adam Loewen was placed on the disabled list. He made his major league debut the next day against the Chicago White Sox. He appeared in a total of eight MLB games for Baltimore, batting 2-for-9 (.222).

=== Chicago White Sox / Colorado Rockies ===
Torres became a free agent at the end of the 2008 season and signed a minor league contract with the Chicago White Sox. During the 2009 season, he played for the Triple-A Charlotte Knights, and hit .240 with a home run and 29 RBI in 92 games. During the 2010 season, Torres played in the Colorado Rockies organization at the Triple-A and Double-A levels. Torres last played professionally in the Venezuelan Professional Baseball League during the 2010–11 and 2011–12 seasons.

== Post-playing career ==
In January 2019, the Boston Red Sox announced that Torres had been hired to serve as hitting coach for one Boston's teams in the Dominican Summer League.

== See also ==
- List of Major League Baseball players from Venezuela
