= Alberto Castillo (pitcher) =

Cuban baseball player (born 1975)

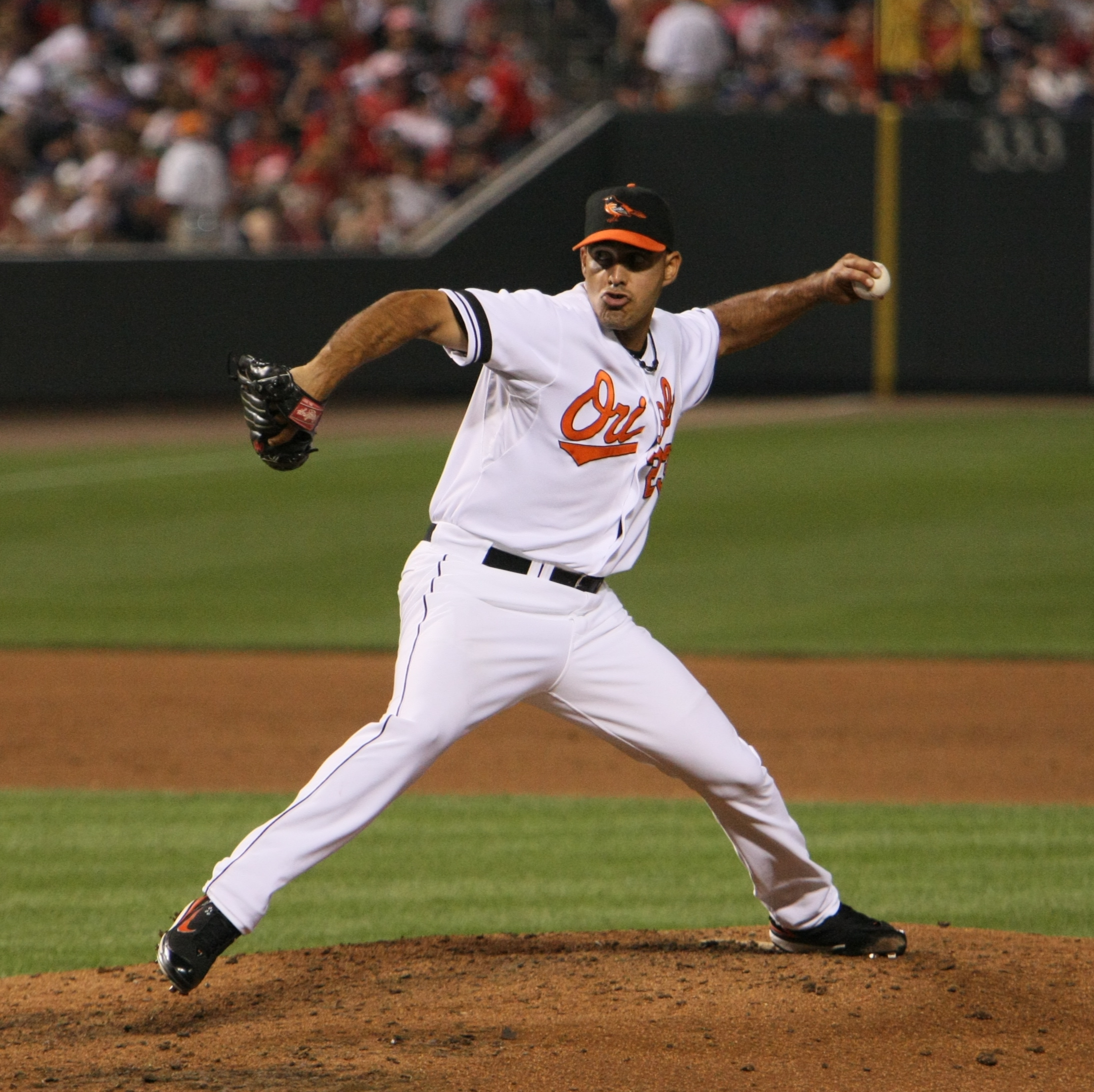
- Castillo with the Baltimore Orioles
- Pitcher
- Born: July 5, 1975 (age 51); Havana, Cuba
- Batted: Left Threw: Left

MLB debut
- July 8, 2008, for the Baltimore Orioles

Last MLB appearance
- September 27, 2011, for the Arizona Diamondbacks

MLB statistics
- Win–loss record: 3–0
- Earned run average: 4.33
- Strikeouts: 48
- Stats at Baseball Reference

Teams
- Baltimore Orioles (2008–2010); Arizona Diamondbacks (2011)

Alberto Castillo Betancourt (born July 5, 1975) is a Cuban former professional baseball pitcher. He played in Major League Baseball (MLB) for the Baltimore Orioles and Arizona Diamondbacks.

== Amateur career ==
Castillo played for Cuba in the 1993 World Junior Championships in Windsor, Ontario, at which time he defected. After relocating to the United States, he enrolled in Miami Dade College where he played amateur baseball at the junior college level.

== Professional career ==
=== Giants and Yankees ===
After being selected by the San Francisco Giants in the third round (88th overall) of the 1994 MLB draft, Castillo began his career in the Giants organization as a first baseman, although he did pitch a few times that season for the Everett Giants. After playing first base exclusively in 1995, he was converted to a full-time pitcher the following year but would briefly return to hitting a few years later and spend a few seasons as a two-way player and even spent another full season as a first baseman.

He spent two more seasons in the Giants system, playing for the Bellingham Giants in 1996 and the San Jose Giants in 1997. That offseason, he was traded by the Giants to the New York Yankees in November 1997 as part of a package for Charlie Hayes. Castillo spent just one season, 1998, in the Yankees' farm system, splitting the season between the Greensboro Bats and Tampa Yankees. He appeared in 17 games, all as a pitcher, but walked 39 batters in 21 innings for a 9.00 ERA.

=== Northern League ===
The Yankees released Castillo in January 1999, and he was signed by the Chicago White Sox. The White Sox released Castillo during spring training, and he spent the 1999 season with the Schaumburg Flyers of the independent Northern League. In 1999, Castillo would pick up the bat again and came to the plate 26 times (mostly as a pinch hitter but did play five games at first base) hitting .348/.407/.739. In 2000, Castillo was brought to spring training by the San Diego Padres, but they, too, released him, and Castillo returned to the Flyers where he continued to pitch and hit. In 2000, he hit .329/.407/.453, and posted a 4.59 ERA over 17 games started.

=== Atlantic League ===
After the 2000 season, Castillo was signed by the Tampa Bay Rays as a hitter and spent the season with the Single-A Bakersfield Blaze, hitting .274/.329/.415 with 11 home runs and 54 RBI while appearing in 82 games at first base. He was released before the beginning of the 2002 season. He returned to the independent leagues, signing with the Newark Bears of the Atlantic League of Professional Baseball again both pitching and hitting. He would only hit .240 with a measly .277 on base percentage spanning 159 plate appearances marking his last time hitting regularly as a professional. In 2003, he was again invited to spring training by an MLB team, this time the St. Louis Cardinals. Once again, however, he was released before the season began, and he returned to the Bears.

In 2004, Castillo found himself without a major league team in the spring for the first time. He started the 2004 season with the Atlantic City Surf of the Atlantic League, then played for the Tuneros de San Luis Potosí of the Mexican League. After missing 2005 due to elbow surgery, Castillo played for the Atlantic League's Road Warriors in 2006 and the beginning of 2007. He finished 2007 with the Camden Riversharks.

=== Baltimore Orioles ===
Castillo finally returned to affiliated baseball when he was signed to a minor league contract by the Baltimore Orioles for the 2008 season. He began that season with the Baltimore Orioles' Triple-A affiliate, the Norfolk Tides, before making his major league debut on April 28, 2008, in the 13th inning against the Chicago White Sox, he faced one batter and picked up the win. He spent the rest of the season with the Orioles, posting a 1–0 record and a 3.81 ERA in 28 relief appearances.

Castillo split the 2009 season between the Orioles and Norfolk, and began 2010 with the Tides as well. Castillo was recalled to the majors shortly thereafter, but on June 10, Castillo was designated for assignment to make room on the Orioles' roster for Jake Arrieta. He was then returned to Norfolk, where he finished the season. He was granted free agency on October 5, 2010. He was re-signed by the Orioles to a minor league contract in December 2010. After starting the season 2–4 with a 1.89 ERA in 20 games for Norfolk, he was granted free agency on June 15, 2011.

=== Arizona Diamondbacks ===
On June 18, 2011, the Arizona Diamondbacks signed Castillo to a minor league deal. He had his contract purchased on June 28. He appeared in 17 games with a 1–0 record and a 2.31 ERA for the Diamondbacks, and then became a free agent on October 21.

=== Los Angeles Dodgers ===
On December 13, 2011, Castillo signed a minor league contract with the Los Angeles Dodgers. On March 18, he was released by the Dodgers.

=== Piratas de Campeche ===
On April 13, 2012, Castillo signed with the Piratas de Campeche of the Mexican League. Castillo was released by the Piratas on May 4.

=== Diablos Rojos del Mexico ===
On April 4, 2015, Castillo signed with the Diablos Rojos del Mexico of the Mexican League. He was released on April 7. Castillo was re-signed by the team on May 8.

=== Guerreros de Oaxaca ===
On June 4, 2015, Castillo was traded to the Guerreros de Oaxaca. He was released on July 5.

=== Joplin Blasters ===
Castillo signed with the Joplin Blasters of the American Association of Independent Professional Baseball following his release.

== See also ==
- List of baseball players who defected from Cuba
