= Elder (given name) =

Elder or Élder is a masculine given name which may refer to:

- Élder (footballer) (born 1976), Brazilian former footballer Élder Alencar Machado de Campos
- Elder José Figueroa (born 1980), Colombian-born Salvadorian footballer
- Elder Filipe (born 1982), Namibian politician
- Élder Granja (born 1982), Brazilian footballer
- Elder Herrera (born 1968), Colombian retired road cyclist
- Elder Jordan (c. 1850–1936), African-American businessman, philanthropist, and namesake to a neighborhood in St. Petersburg, Florida
- Elder Olson (1909–1992), American poet, teacher and literary critic
- Elder Vogel, Jr., American politician
- Elder White (1933-2010), Major League Baseball player in part of the 1962 season
