= Jim Miller (pitcher) =

American baseball player (born 1982)

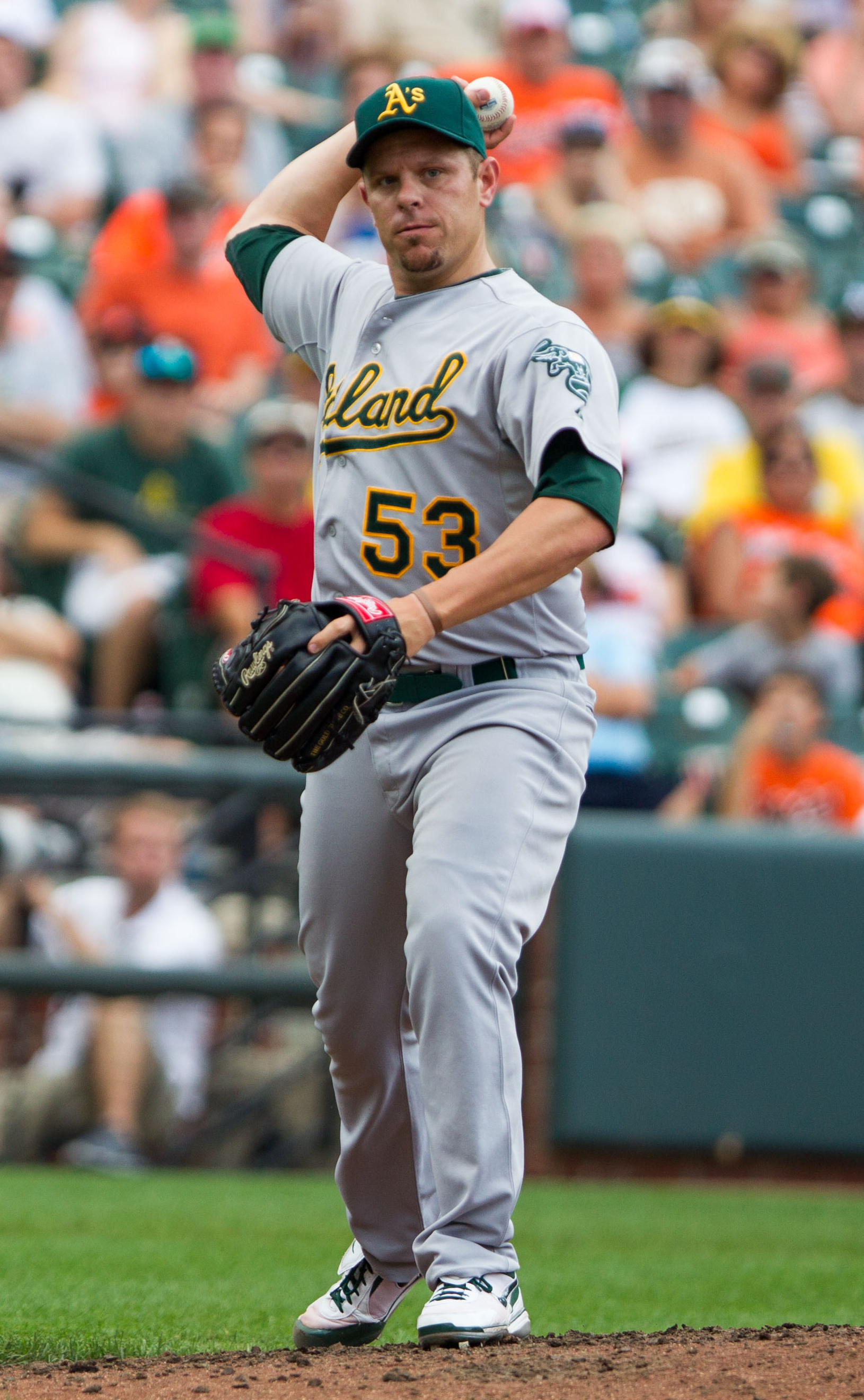
- Miller with the Oakland Athletics
- Pitcher
- Born: April 28, 1982 (age 44); Morristown, New Jersey, U.S.
- Batted: Right Threw: Right

MLB debut
- September 1, 2008, for the Baltimore Orioles

Last appearance
- July 10, 2014, for the New York Yankees

MLB statistics
- Win–loss record: 2–3
- Earned run average: 3.48
- Strikeouts: 59
- Stats at Baseball Reference

Teams
- Baltimore Orioles (2008); Colorado Rockies (2011); Oakland Athletics (2012); New York Yankees (2013–2014)

James Matthew Miller (born April 28, 1982) is an American former professional baseball pitcher. He played in Major League Baseball (MLB) for the Baltimore Orioles, Colorado Rockies, Oakland Athletics, and New York Yankees.

== Amateur career ==
Miller attended North Fort Myers High School in North Fort Myers, Florida. He attended Mars Hill University located in North Carolina. He then transferred and attended the University of Louisiana at Monroe, where he played college baseball for the Louisiana–Monroe Warhawks baseball team.

== Professional career ==
=== Colorado Rockies ===
Miller was drafted in the eighth round (230th overall) of the 2004 MLB draft by the Colorado Rockies. During his time with the Rockies organization, he was a three-time minor league all-star.

=== Baltimore Orioles ===
On January 12, 2007, Miller was traded to the Baltimore Orioles alongside minor league pitcher Jason Burch in exchange for Rodrigo López. He was called up on September 1, 2008, to the Orioles, and made his major league debut against the Boston Red Sox on the same day, allowing one unearned run and two walks in two-thirds of an inning. Later that month, Miller pitched in the second to last game at the original Yankee Stadium, going down in history as the last pitcher to hit a batter at that stadium when he hit Derek Jeter in the bottom of the ninth inning.

=== Return to the Colorado Rockies ===
On January 15, 2011, Miller returned to the Rockies on a minor league contract. He made his Rockies debut that year on September 7 against the Arizona Diamondbacks.

=== Oakland Athletics ===
In November 2011, Miller signed a minor league contract with the Oakland Athletics. He made his Athletics debut on April 25, 2012, against the Chicago White Sox, and was the winning pitcher in that game.

=== New York Yankees ===
Miller was claimed off waivers by the New York Yankees on November 30, 2012. After spending the year in Triple-A, his contract was selected from the Triple-A Scranton/Wilkes-Barre RailRiders. On September 7, 2013, he gave up the first career home run to Boston Red Sox shortstop Xander Bogaerts. He was designated for assignment on September 11. He was outrighted to Triple-A Scranton on September 16, 2013.

His contract was selected from Scranton on July 1, 2014, and he was designated for assignment on July 11.

=== Tampa Bay Rays ===
On March 4, 2015, Miller signed with the Tampa Bay Rays on a minor league contract.

=== Milwaukee Brewers ===
On November 19, 2015, Miller signed a minor league contract with the Milwaukee Brewers. The deal included an invite to spring training. He was released on May 24, 2016.

=== Minnesota Twins ===
Miller was with the Minnesota Twins for spring training in 2017, but was released in March.

== Pitching style ==
Miller is mainly a fastball-slider pitcher. His four-seamer sits between 92 and 95 mph, while his slider is throw in the low-mid 80s. Less commonly, he throws a curveball in the low 70s and a cut fastball.
