= Steve Trachsel =

American baseball player (born 1970)

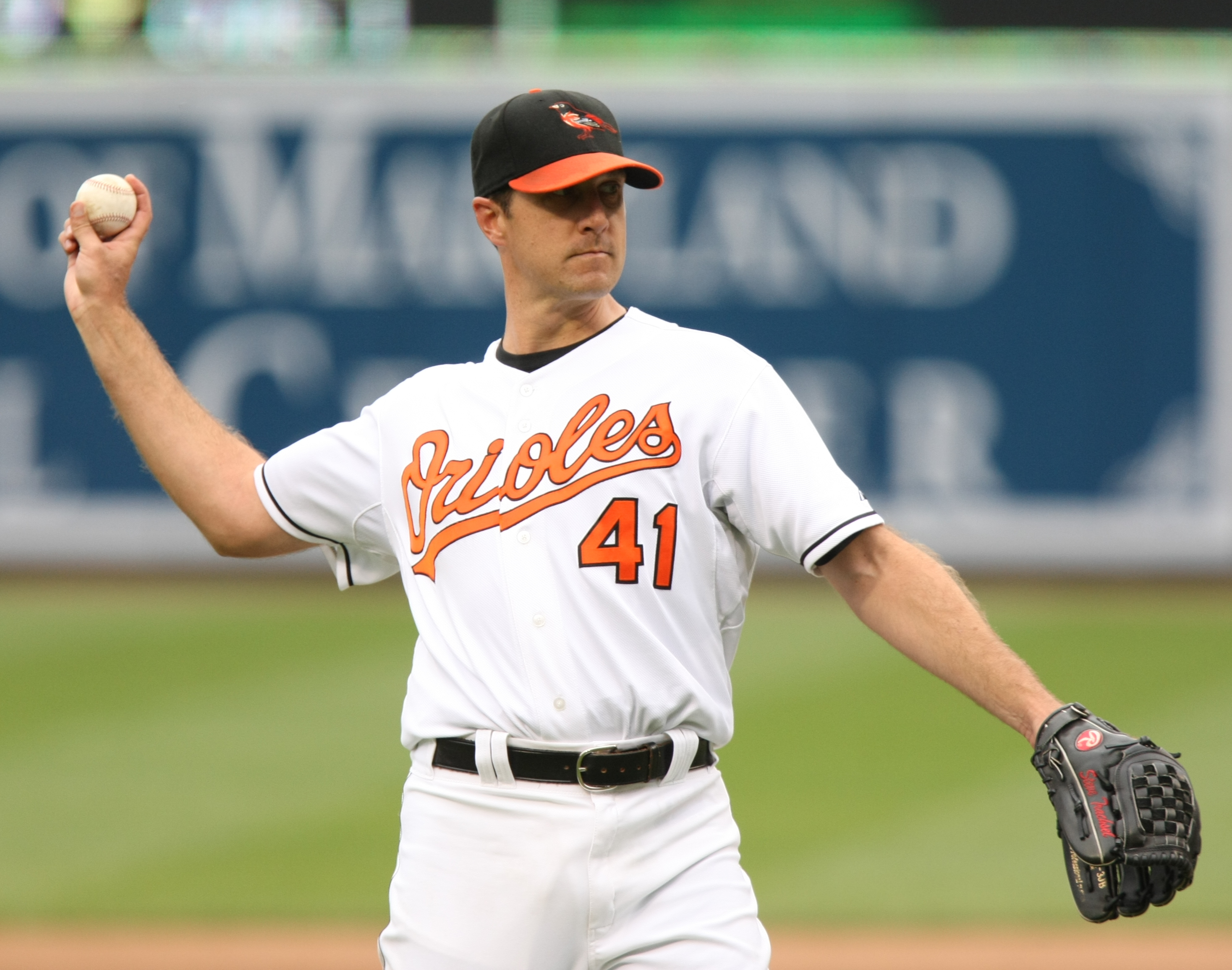
- Trachsel with the Baltimore Orioles in 2008
- Pitcher
- Born: October 31, 1970 (age 55); Oxnard, California, U.S.
- Batted: Right Threw: Right

MLB debut
- September 19, 1993, for the Chicago Cubs

Last MLB appearance
- June 7, 2008, for the Baltimore Orioles

MLB statistics
- Win–loss record: 143–159
- Earned run average: 4.39
- Strikeouts: 1,591
- Stats at Baseball Reference

Teams
- Chicago Cubs (1993–1999); Tampa Bay Devil Rays (2000); Toronto Blue Jays (2000); New York Mets (2001–2006); Baltimore Orioles (2007); Chicago Cubs (2007); Baltimore Orioles (2008)

Career highlights and awards
- All-Star (1996)

Stephen Christopher Trachsel (born October 31, 1970) is an American former Major League Baseball pitcher with the Chicago Cubs, Tampa Bay Devil Rays, Toronto Blue Jays, New York Mets and the Baltimore Orioles between 1993 and 2008. He batted and threw right-handed.

== Amateur career ==
Trachsel graduated from Troy High School in Fullerton, California, in 1988. He attended Fullerton College and Long Beach State University. In 1991, he led Long Beach to a spot in the College World Series. He was drafted by the Chicago Cubs in the eighth round (215th overall) 1991 MLB draft.

== Professional career ==
=== Minor League Baseball ===
In 1991, Trachsel began his professional career with the short-season Geneva Cubs and the Class-A Advanced Winston-Salem Spirits. He went a combined 5–4 with a 3.27 ERA in 14 starts.

Trachsel was promoted to the Double-A Charlotte Knights of the Southern League in 1992. He was 13–8 with a 3.06 ERA and 135 strikeouts in 29 starts.

=== Chicago Cubs ===
He began the 1993 season with the Triple-A Iowa Cubs where he went 13–8 with a 3.95 ERA and 135 strikeouts in 27 games (26 starts). Trachsel was promoted to the Major Leagues in September and made his debut on September 19 against the Florida Marlins, going seven innings with five strikeouts while giving up two earned runs and taking the loss.

Trachsel would play most of the 1994 season with Chicago, pitching just two games in Iowa and going 0–2 with a 10.00 ERA. His major league stats were much better, as he finished 9–7 with a 3.21 ERA in 22 starts. He also had one complete game and struck out 108 total over the season.

In 1995, Trachsel spent his first full season at the Major League level. He went 7–13 with a 5.15 ERA, 117 strikeouts and two complete games in 30 games (29 starts).

Trachsel was named to the Major League Baseball All-Star Game and posted a career-best 3.03 ERA in 1996. He also finished the season with a record of 13–9 with two shutouts, three complete games and 132 strikeouts in 32 starts. His first shutout was a one-hit game against the Houston Astros on May 14 where he surrendered the only hit on a lead-off double to Brian Hunter. He also made two starts with the Double-A Orlando Cubs, where he went 0–1 with a 2.77 ERA. On September 7, in a 4-2 loss to the Cubs, Trachsel hit future Hall of Famer Scott Rolen with a pitch that fractured his wrist, ending what would have been Rolen's rookie season with exactly 130 at bats, the limit for rookie eligibility at the time. Had Rolen not fractured his arm in his final plate appearance, he would have been considered a 1996 rookie, but a hit by pitch does not count as an at bat, thus preserving his eligibility for the following season in 1997, in which he won the National League Rookie of the Year Award.

In 1997, Trachsel started a career-high 34 games with the Cubs, a record he has tied twice. He went 8–12 with a 4.51 ERA and 160 strikeouts. He led the National League in home runs allowed and was second in hits allowed.

In 1998, Trachsel went 15–8 with an ERA of 4.46, 149 strikeouts and one complete game in 33 starts. On September 8, Trachsel allowed Mark McGwire's record breaking 62nd home run, breaking Roger Maris' longtime record of 61. McGwire hit the pitch 341 feet over the left field wall, his shortest of the year. McGwire went on to hit 70 home runs that year.

Additionally, Trachsel was the starting and winning pitcher in the Cubs' 5–3 Wild Card tie-breaker game victory over the San Francisco Giants, giving up just one hit through six-plus innings.

In 1999, Trachsel's ERA rose to a career-worst 5.56; his 18 losses were two worse than any pitcher that season. He became a free agent after the season.

=== Tampa Bay Devil Rays ===
On January 14, 2000, Trachsel signed a one-year, $1 million contract with the Tampa Bay Devil Rays. He began the season going 6–10 with a 4.58 ERA in 23 starts.

=== Toronto Blue Jays ===
On July 31, 2000, Trachsel was traded to the Toronto Blue Jays along with pitcher Mark Guthrie in exchange for minor league second baseman Brent Abernathy and a player to be named later. In 11 starts with Toronto, Trachsel was 2–5 with a 5.29 ERA. Combined between Tampa Bay and Toronto, he finished 8–15 with a 4.80 ERA in 34 starts.

=== New York Mets ===
On December 12, 2000, Trachsel agreed to a two-year, $7 million contract with the New York Mets. He got off to a poor start in 2001 (including becoming the only pitcher in Mets history to allow four home runs in one inning), and he was sent to the minor leagues on May 19. At the time, he had a 1–6 record and a 8.24 ERA. Upon returning to the Mets, his career was reborn. He finished 2001 with an 11–13 record and a 4.46 ERA in 28 starts. He continued to shine in 2002, when he finished 11–11 and had a 3.37 ERA in 30 starts.

After entering free agency again following the 2002 season, Trachsel re-signed with the Mets on a two-year, $8 million contract on December 7, 2002. His success continued as he finished 16–10 with a 3.78 ERA in 33 starts in 2003. On August 7, 2003, Trachsel earned the 100th win of his career against the Houston Astros. Trachsel was even named the National League Player of the Week on August 25, 2003, following a 16.1 inning span in which he allowed no walks, no runs and only six hits. However, after starting well in 2004, he suffered a herniated disc in his back, the first major injury of his career, which also cost him most of the 2005 season. He underwent a discectomy in March 2005, and returned for the final six starts of the season, posting a league-average 4.14 ERA and going 1–4.

In 2006, Trachsel recovered to start 30 games and tied Tom Glavine for the team lead with 15 wins, despite posting an ERA of 4.97. On September 18, 2006, he had one of his best performances of the season as the Mets clinched the National League Eastern Division Championship. He pitched 6 1/3 innings, allowing three hits and three strikeouts in the 4–0 win over the Florida Marlins. He also started the clincher of the NLDS, but was shaky and removed in the fourth inning. In Game 3 of the NLCS, he gave up five runs in just one inning before being hit by a hard ground ball. The Mets lost the game 5–0.

=== Baltimore Orioles and Chicago Cubs ===
Trachsel was signed by the Baltimore Orioles as a free agent on February 12, 2007, after Orioles starter and fellow former Mets right-hander Kris Benson was diagnosed with a torn rotator cuff that kept him sidelined for the 2007 season. On August 31, 2007, Trachsel rejoined the Chicago Cubs by being traded for minor league players Rocky Cherry and Scott Moore. On February 11, 2008, he signed a minor league contract with an invitation to spring training with the Baltimore Orioles. On March 27, he was added to the 40-man roster. He was designated for assignment on June 10, 2008. He was released on June 13, 2008.

Preceded by Wilson Álvarez	Tampa Bay Devil Rays Opening Day; Starting pitcher 2000	Succeeded by Albie Lopez
