= Adam Loewen =

Canadian baseball player (born 1984)

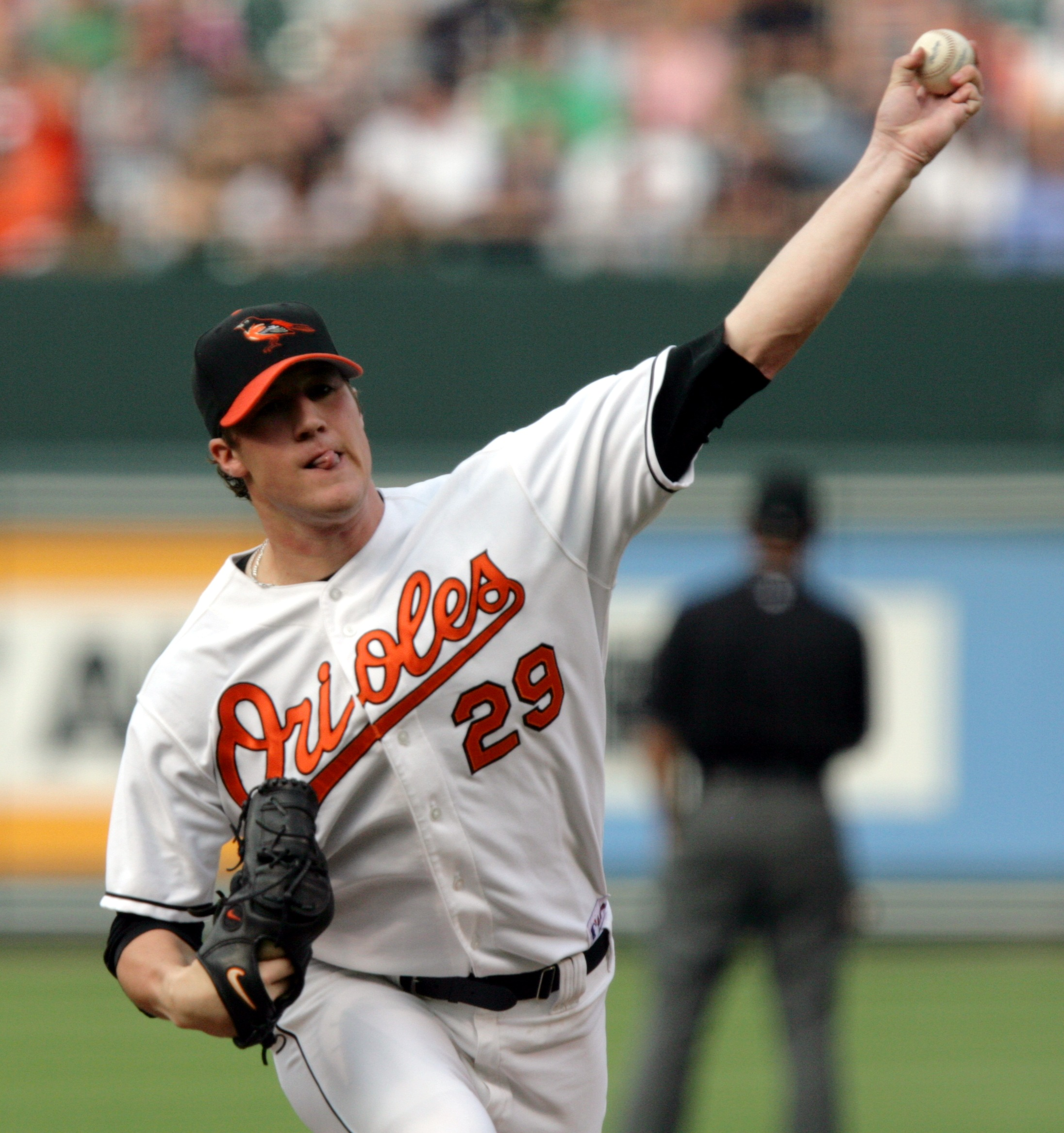
- Loewen pitching for the Baltimore Orioles in 2006
- Pitcher / Outfielder
- Born: April 9, 1984 (age 42); Surrey, British Columbia, Canada
- Batted: Left Threw: Left

MLB debut
- May 23, 2006, for the Baltimore Orioles

Last appearance
- August 14, 2016, for the Arizona Diamondbacks

MLB statistics
- Win–loss record: 10–8
- Earned run average: 5.85
- Strikeouts: 159
- Batting average: .189
- Home runs: 1
- Runs batted in: 4
- Stats at Baseball Reference

Teams
- Baltimore Orioles (2006–2008); Toronto Blue Jays (2011); Philadelphia Phillies (2015); Arizona Diamondbacks (2016)
Medals
Men's baseball
Representing Canada
Baseball World Cup
| Bronze medal – third place | 2009 Nettuno | Team |

Adam Alexander Loewen (born April 9, 1984) is a Canadian former professional baseball pitcher and outfielder. He played in Major League Baseball (MLB) for the Baltimore Orioles, Toronto Blue Jays, Philadelphia Phillies, and Arizona Diamondbacks.

Loewen pitched in the major leagues for the Orioles from 2006 to 2008, before converting to a position player. He played with the Blue Jays as an outfielder in 2011. After spending the next two seasons in the minor leagues as a position player, Loewen converted back to a pitcher, and was called up to the Phillies in August 2015. He pitched for the Diamondbacks in 2016.

Though there have been full-time pitchers who have converted to full-time position players, and vice versa, Loewen's three-stage career (converting from full-time pitcher to full-time position player and back to full-time pitcher) is unique in major league history.

== Biography ==
Loewen grew up in Surrey, British Columbia, and was both a starting pitcher and first baseman for Kennedy-Surrey Little League, the team that represented Canada at the 1996 Little League World Series in Williamsport, Pennsylvania. He would go on to attend Fraser Valley Christian High School and play baseball for the Whalley Chiefs of the British Columbia Premier Baseball League. He committed to play college baseball at Arizona State. While still in high school, he pitched a no-hitter against the Dominican Summer League Pirates for the Canadian national baseball team.

== Professional career ==
=== Baltimore Orioles ===
The Baltimore Orioles selected Loewen in the first round, with the fourth overall pick, of the 2002 Major League Baseball draft. This was the highest a Canadian player had ever been drafted until righthander Jameson Taillon was drafted second overall by the Pittsburgh Pirates (though he remains the highest Canadian-born player ever picked, as Taillon was born the child of Canadian nationals in Florida). Loewen went on to play one season with Chipola College, but signed a Major League Baseball contract with Baltimore worth $4.02 million shortly thereafter. In 2004, he was named their top prospect by Baseball America. However, by early 2006, he had been downgraded to the team's second best prospect.

Loewen garnered international attention on March 8, 2006, when he started for Canada against the United States team in the first round of the 2006 World Baseball Classic. Loewen pitched 3 2/3 scoreless innings and earned the win.

During the 2006 season, Loewen was called up by the Orioles. In his first four major league starts, he faced three former Cy Young Award winners: Randy Johnson, Tom Glavine and Roy Halladay, whom he faced twice. This made Loewen the first pitcher in Major League Baseball history to face Cy Young winners in his first four starts. He was injured early in the 2007 season, suffering a stress fracture to his pitching elbow, and was later placed on the 60-day disabled list in May.

Loewen began to develop control problems during spring training, where he led the Majors in walks, with 19 in just over 16 innings. His lack of control did not cease during the early stages of the regular season, and after experiencing soreness in his left arm throughout April, Loewen was placed on the disabled list and missed the next two months of the season. Although he was subsequently converted into a relief pitcher when he returned in July, he experienced a sharp pain in his surgically repaired elbow. This injury, diagnosed as a stress fracture, eventually caused him to prematurely end his season. Loewen announced on July 19 that he would no longer be a pitcher due to his chronic injuries, and that he would convert to an outfielder/first baseman. He temporarily ended his pitching career with a lifetime 8–8 record, with an earned run average of 5.38 and 134 strikeouts; he would return to pitching in 2014, as recounted below.

=== Transition to position player ===
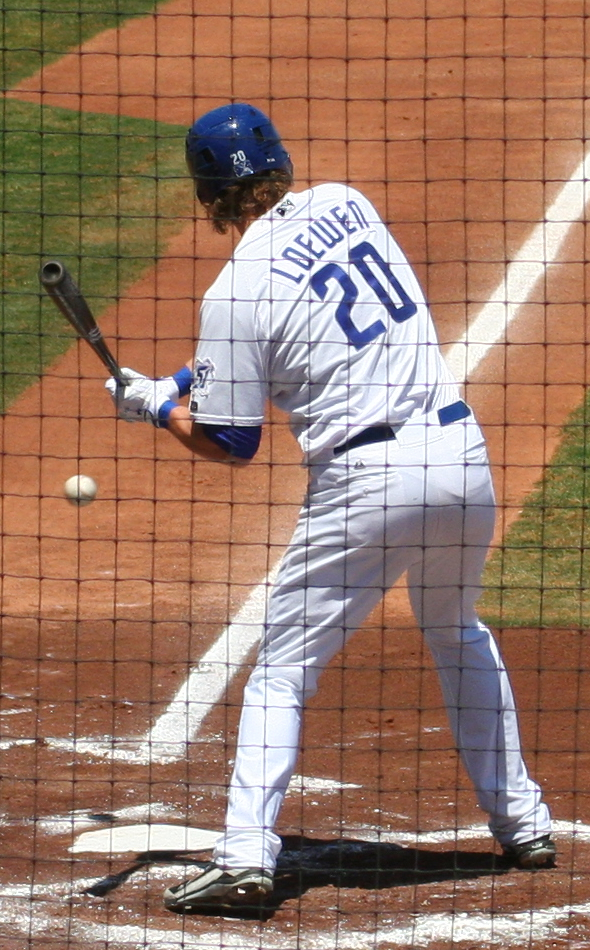
Loewen batting for the Las Vegas 51s, Triple-A affiliates of the Toronto Blue Jays, in 2011.

Due to the nature of his injury and his inability to remain as a pitcher, Loewen had the Orioles' support when he made the decision to transition to a position player. His contract stipulated that he was required to remain with the big league club on its active roster at this stage in his career. As Loewen would need time in the minors to learn a new position and pick up batting experience, both sides agreed on October 20, 2008, that Loewen would be released from his contract. Both sides had talked about re-signing him to a minor league contract though no formal agreement was ever reached. The Orioles had hoped to develop Loewen to play at first base but were also actively in the market to sign free agent first basemen. Loewen reportedly received several offers from other teams, and signed a minor-league contract with the Toronto Blue Jays. After attending minor-league spring training with the Jays, Loewen was assigned to the Dunedin Blue Jays on April 9, 2009.

During 2011 with Triple-A Las Vegas, Loewen batted .306 with 17 home runs and 85 RBI in 134 games, which also saw him play all three outfield positions as well as first base.

=== Toronto Blue Jays ===
Loewen was called up to the Blue Jays on September 6, 2011, marking his first trip back to the majors since becoming a position player. Loewen made his position player debut on September 7, against the Boston Red Sox. He recorded his first career hit in the eighth inning, against reliever Daniel Bard. In a game against his former team, the Baltimore Orioles, on September 11, Loewen hit his first career home run, a solo shot over the centre field wall off starter Tommy Hunter.

=== New York Mets ===
On November 22, 2011, Loewen signed a minor league contract with the New York Mets. He spent most of the 2012 season with the Triple-A Buffalo Bisons, batting .227 with eight home runs and 27 RBI in 63 games.

=== Toronto Blue Jays (second stint) ===
The Toronto Blue Jays announced on January 12, 2013, that Loewen had been signed to a minor league contract with an invitation to spring training. Initially, Loewen was to start the 2013 season with the Double-A New Hampshire Fisher Cats; however, on April 2, Loewen was promoted to the Triple-A Buffalo Bisons, where he played during 2012 in the Mets farm system. On April 11, Loewen was sent down to Double-A New Hampshire. In 115 games with New Hampshire, he hit .269 with 15 home runs and 60 RBI.

=== Philadelphia Phillies and return to pitching ===
On April 16, 2014, Loewen signed a two-year minor league contract with the Philadelphia Phillies as a pitcher. The team sent him to extended spring training. He made two starts in May for the High-A Clearwater Threshers before being promoted to the Double-A Reading Fightin Phils.

On August 7, 2015, Loewen was called up by the Phillies from the Triple–A Lehigh Valley IronPigs. In 20 appearances for the Phillies, he struggled to a 6.98 ERA with 22 strikeouts across 19 1/3 innings of work. On October 7, Loewen was removed from the 40–man roster and sent outright to Triple–A Lehigh Valley. He elected free agency on October 12.

=== Arizona Diamondbacks ===
On October 30, 2015, Loewen signed a minor league contract with the Arizona Diamondbacks. On July 30, 2016, the Diamondbacks brought Loewen up from the Triple-A Reno Aces as a pitcher. In 8 appearances for the Diamondbacks, he struggled to a 15.00 ERA with 3 strikeouts over 6 innings of work. Loewen was designated for assignment by Arizona on August 15. He cleared waivers and was outright to Triple-A Reno on August 18. Loewen elected free agency on October 5.

=== Texas Rangers ===
On February 13, 2017, Loewen signed a minor league contract with the Texas Rangers. In 50 appearances out of the bullpen split between the Double–A Frisco RoughRiders and Triple–A Round Rock Express, he accumulated a 6–1 record and 3.81 ERA with 67 strikeouts across 52 innings pitched. Loewen elected free agency following the season on November 6.

On January 12, 2018, Loewen re-signed with the Rangers. On May 31, Loewen was released by the Rangers after spending the beginning of the year with Triple-A Round Rock.

=== New Britain Bees ===
On June 26, 2018, Loewen signed with the New Britain Bees of the Atlantic League of Professional Baseball. In 26 appearances for the Bees, he registered a 3–0 record and 1.64 ERA with 28 strikeouts across 22 innings of relief. Loewen became a free agent following the 2018 season.

== International career ==
Loewen played for the Canadian national baseball team at the 2006 World Baseball Classic, 2009 Baseball World Cup 2013 World Baseball Classic, 2019 Pan American Games Qualifier and 2019 WBSC Premier12. He came out of retirement to pitch in the 2023 World Baseball Classic.

== Personal life ==
Loewen and his wife, Lynda, had two children. She died from breast cancer in 2021 at the age of 37.
