= 2008 Boston Red Sox season =

Major League Baseball season

2008 Boston Red Sox
- American League Wild Card winners
- League: American League
- Division: East
- Ballpark: Fenway Park
- City: Boston, Massachusetts
- Record: 95–67 (.586)
- Divisional place: 2nd
- Owners: John W. Henry (New England Sports Ventures)
- President: Larry Lucchino
- General manager: Theo Epstein
- Manager: Terry Francona
- Television: NESN
- Radio: WRKO; WEEI; WROL (Spanish)
- Stats: ESPN.com; Baseball Reference

The 2008 Boston Red Sox season was the 108th season in the franchise's Major League Baseball history. The Red Sox, as the defending World Series champions, finished in second place in the American League East with a record of 95–67, two games behind the Tampa Bay Rays. The Red Sox qualified for the postseason as the AL wild card and defeated the American League West champion Los Angeles Angels of Anaheim in the ALDS. The Red Sox then lost to the Rays in the ALCS in seven games. This was the franchise's fourth appearance in the ALCS in six seasons.

In late March, the team started the regular season playing in Tokyo against the Oakland Athletics for MLB Japan Opening Day 2008. Following these two games, the Red Sox returned stateside to resume spring training via a three-game series of exhibition games against the Los Angeles Dodgers; the first and final games of that series were at Dodger Stadium, while the middle game, a 7-4 Boston victory, was held at Los Angeles Memorial Coliseum and drew a world record crowd of 115,300.

In July, seven Red Sox players were selected for the AL All-Star team, with outfielder J. D. Drew being named the game's MVP. On July 31, the Red Sox traded long-time star player Manny Ramirez to the Dodgers in a three-way blockbuster (which also included the Pirates) for Jason Bay and minor leaguer Josh Wilson. In September, the team officially retired uniform number 6 in honor of Johnny Pesky.

== Regular season ==
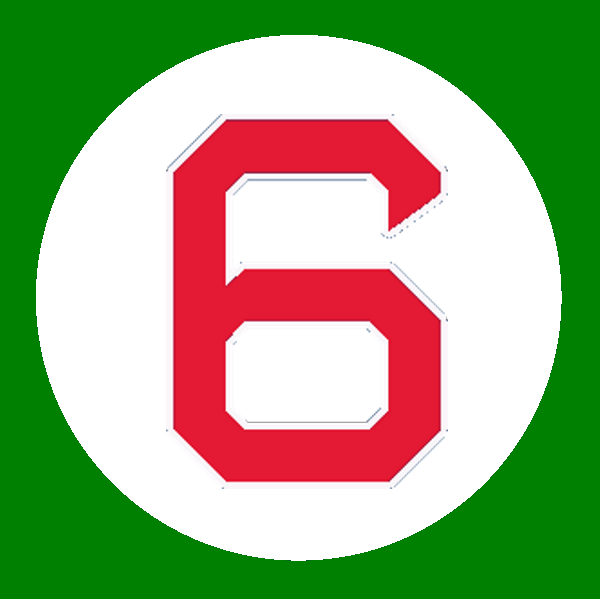
Johnny Pesky's number 6 was retired by the Boston Red Sox in 2008.

Prior to the season, three large Coca-Cola bottles, which had been placed on the left light tower above the Green Monster prior to the 1997 season as an advertisement, were removed.

=== Opening Day lineup ===
15	Dustin Pedroia	2B
20	Kevin Youkilis	1B
34	David Ortiz	DH
24	Manny Ramirez	LF
25	Mike Lowell	3B
44	Brandon Moss	RF
33	Jason Varitek	C
46	Jacoby Ellsbury	CF
23	Julio Lugo	SS
18	Daisuke Matsuzaka	P

=== Season standings ===
AL East
Team	W	L	Pct.	GB	Home	Road
Tampa Bay Rays	97	65	.599	—	57‍–‍24	40‍–‍41
Boston Red Sox	95	67	.586	2	56‍–‍25	39‍–‍42
New York Yankees	89	73	.549	8	48‍–‍33	41‍–‍40
Toronto Blue Jays	86	76	.531	11	47‍–‍34	39‍–‍42
Baltimore Orioles	68	93	.422	28½	37‍–‍43	31‍–‍50

=== Notable transactions ===
- May 22, 2008: Julián Tavárez was released by the Red Sox.
- July 12, 2008: Bobby Kielty was released by the Red Sox.
- July 31, 2008: As part of a three-team trade, star outfielder Jason Bay was acquired by the Red Sox from the Pirates for pitcher Craig Hansen and outfielder/first baseman Brandon Moss. Also in exchange, the Red Sox sent star outfielder Manny Ramirez to the Dodgers.
- August 12, 2008: Paul Byrd was acquired by the Red Sox from the Indians in exchange for a player to be named later.
- August 22, 2008: David Ross signed as a free agent with the Red Sox.
- August 27, 2008: Mark Kotsay was acquired by the Red Sox from the Braves in exchange for minor leaguer Luis Sumoza.

=== Roster ===
2008 Boston Red Sox
Roster
Pitchers: 53 David Aardsma; 19 Josh Beckett; 64 Michael Bowden; 61 Clay Buchholz; 36 Paul Byrd; 40 Bartolo Colón; 30 Bryan Corey; 17 Manny Delcarmen; 43 Devern Hansack; 56 Craig Hansen; 31 Jon Lester; 48 Javier López; 63 Justin Masterson; 18 Daisuke Matsuzaka; 37 Hideki Okajima; 58 Jonathan Papelbon; 62 David Pauley; 59 Chris Smith; 39 Kyle Snyder; 51 Julián Tavárez; 50 Mike Timlin; 49 Tim Wakefield; 51 Charlie Zink	Catchers: 36,30 Kevin Cash; 68 George Kottaras; 28 David Ross; 33 Jason Varitek; Infielders: 55 Jeff Bailey; 22 Sean Casey; 13 Alex Cora; 25 Mike Lowell; 12 Jed Lowrie; 23 Julio Lugo; 15 Dustin Pedroia; 51 Gil Velazquez; 20 Kevin Youkilis	Outfielders: 44 Jason Bay; 54 Chris Carter; 10 Coco Crisp; 7 J. D. Drew; 46 Jacoby Ellsbury; 11 Mark Kotsay; 44 Brandon Moss; 24 Manny Ramirez; 3 Joe Thurston; 30,60 Jonathan Van Every; Other batters: 34 David Ortiz	Manager: 47 Terry Francona; Coaches: 16 Luis Alicea (first base); 52 John Farrell (pitching); 35 DeMarlo Hale (third base); 29 Dave Magadan (hitting); 2 Brad Mills (bench); 57 Gary Tuck (bullpen)

=== Record vs. opponents ===
2008 American League record Source: MLB Standings Grid – 2008
Team	BAL	BOS	CWS	CLE	DET	KC	LAA	MIN	NYY	OAK	SEA	TB	TEX	TOR	NL
Baltimore	–	6–12	4–5	4–4	4–3	5–3	3–6	3–3	7–11	0–5	8–2	3–15	4–5	6–12	11–7
Boston	12–6	–	4–3	5–1	5–2	6–1	1–8	4–3	9–9	6–4	6–3	8–10	9–1	9–9	11–7
Chicago	5–4	3–4	–	11–7	12–6	12–6	5–5	9–10	2–5	5–4	5–1	4–6	3–3	1–7	12–6
Cleveland	4–4	1–5	7–11	–	11–7	10–8	4–5	8–10	4–3	5–4	4–5	5–2	6–4	6–1	6–12
Detroit	3–4	2–5	6–12	7–11	–	7–11	3–6	7–11	4–2	3–6	7–3	3–4	6–3	3–5	13–5
Kansas City	3–5	1–6	6–12	8–10	11–7	–	2–3	6–12	5–5	6–3	7–2	3–5	2–7	2–5	13–5
Los Angeles	6–3	8–1	5–5	5–4	6–3	3–2	–	5–3	7–3	10–9	14–5	3–6	12–7	6–3	10–8
Minnesota	3–3	3–4	10–9	10–8	11–7	12–6	3–5	–	4–6	5–5	5–4	3–3	5–5	0–6	14–4
New York	11–7	9–9	5–2	3–4	2–4	5–5	3–7	6–4	–	5–1	7–2	11–7	3–4	9–9	10–8
Oakland	5–0	4–6	4–5	4–5	6–3	3–6	9–10	5–5	1–5	-	10–9	3–6	7–12	4–6	10–8
Seattle	2–8	3–6	1–5	5–4	3–7	2–7	5–14	4–5	2–7	9–10	–	3–4	8–11	5–4	9–9
Tampa Bay	15–3	10–8	6–4	2–5	4–3	5–3	6–3	3–3	7–11	6–3	4–3	–	6–3	11–7	12–6
Texas	5–4	1–9	3–3	4–6	3–6	7–2	7–12	5–5	4–3	12–7	11–8	3–6	–	4–4	10–8
Toronto	12–6	9–9	7–1	1–6	5–3	5–2	3–6	6–0	9–9	6–4	4–5	7–11	4–4	–	8–10

Red Sox vs. National League
Team	NL Central							
Team	CHC	CIN	HOU	MIL	PIT	STL	ARI	PHI
Boston	—	2–1	1–2	3–0	—	1–2	2–1	2–1

=== Game log ===
2008 Regular Season Game Log

March (1-1)
#	Date	Opponent	Score	Win	Loss	Save	Attendance	Record
1	March 25	@ Athletics*	6–5 (10)	Okajima (1–0)	Street (0–1)	Papelbon (1)	44,628	1–0
2	March 26	@ Athletics*	5–1	Harden (1–0)	Lester (0–1)		44,735	1–1
* At Tokyo Dome in Tokyo, Japan, see MLB Japan Opening Day 2008

April (16–11)
#	Date	Opponent	Score	Win	Loss	Save	Attendance	Record
3	April 1	@ Athletics	2–1	Matsuzaka (1–0)	Blanton (0–1)	Papelbon (2)	36,067	2–1
4	April 2	@ Athletics	5–0	Lester (1–1)	Embree (0–1)		21,625	3–1
5	April 4	@ Blue Jays	6–3	Marcum (1–0)	Aardsma (0–1)	Accardo (2)	50,171	3–2
6	April 5	@ Blue Jays	10–2	Litsch (1–0)	Buchholz (0–1)		35,238	3–3
7	April 6	@ Blue Jays	7–4	Halladay (1–1)	Beckett (0–1)	Accardo (3)	30,114	3–4
8	April 8	Tigers	5–0	Matsuzaka (2–0)	Rogers (0–2)		36,567	4–4
9	April 9	Tigers	7–2	Bonderman (1–1)	Lester (1–2)		37,190	4–5
10	April 10	Tigers	12–6	Wakefield (1–0)	Robertson (0–1)	Papelbon (3)	37,612	5–5
11	April 11	Yankees	4–1	Wang (3–0)	Timlin (0–1)		37,624	5–6
12	April 12	Yankees	4–3	Beckett (1–1)	Mussina (1–2)	Papelbon (4)	37,461	6–6
13	April 13	Yankees	8–5	Matsuzaka (3–0)	Hughes (0–2)		37,876	7–6
14	April 14	@ Indians	6–4	Timlin (1–1	Borowski (0–2)	Papelbon (5)	21,802	8–6
15	April 15	@ Indians	5–3	Aardsma (1–1)	Lewis (0–1)	Okajima (1)	25,135	9–6
16	April 16	@ Yankees	15–9	Hawkins (1–0)	Tavárez (0–1)	Bruney (1)	54,667	9–7
17	April 17	@ Yankees	7–5	Beckett (2–1)	Mussina (1–3)		55,088	10–7
18	April 18	Rangers	11–3	Matsuzaka (4–0)	Mendoza (0–2)		37,902	11–7
19	April 19	Rangers	5–3	López (1–0)	Benoit (1–1)	Papelbon (6)	37,958	12–7
20	April 20	Rangers	6–5	Wakefield (2–0)	Wilson (0–1)	Papelbon (7)	37,480	13–7
21	April 21	Rangers	8–3	Buchholz (1–1)	Nippert (1–2)		37,539	14–7
22	April 22	Angels	7–6	Timlin (2–1)	Oliver (1–1)	Papelbon (8)	37,982	15–7
23	April 23	Angels	6–4	Garland (3–2)	Hansen (0–1)	Rodríguez (8)	38,172	15–8
24	April 24	Angels	7–5	Saunders (4–0)	Delcarmen (0–1)	Rodríguez (9)	36,848	15–9
25	April 25	@ Rays	5–4	Dohmann (1–0)	Timlin (2–2)		30,290	15–10
26	April 26	@ Rays	2–1	Dohmann (2–0)	Buchholz (1–2)	Percival (5)	36,048	15–11
27	April 27	@ Rays	3–0	Shields (3–1)	Beckett (2–2)		32,363	15–12
28	April 29	Blue Jays	1–0	Papelbon (1–0)	Halladay (2–4)		37,215	16–12
29	April 30	Blue Jays	2–1	Papelbon (2–0)	Downs(0–1)		37,710	17–12

May (17–12)
#	Date	Opponent	Score	Win	Loss	Save	Attendance	Record
30	May 1	Blue Jays	3–0	Burnett (3–2)	Wakefield (2–1)	Ryan (3)	37,821	17–13
31	May 2	Rays	7–3	Buchholz (2–2)	Jackson (2–3)		37,541	18–13
32	May 3	Rays	12–4	Beckett (3–2)	Shields (3–2)		37,700	19–13
33	May 4	Rays	7–3	Lester (2–2)	Kazmir (0–1)	Papelbon (9)	37,091	20–13
34	May 5	@ Tigers	6–3	Matsuzaka (5–0)	Bonderman (2–3)	Papelbon (10)	39,478	21–13
35	May 6	@ Tigers	5–0	Wakefield (3–1)	Robertson (1–4)		38,564	22–13
36	May 7	@ Tigers	10–9	Jones (1–0)	Papelbon (2–1)		38,062	22–14
37	May 8	@ Tigers	5–1	Beckett (4–2)	Verlander (1–6)		38,592	23–14
38	May 9	@ Twins	7–6	Crain (1–1)	Papelbon (2–2)		25,477	23–15
39	May 10	@ Twins	5–2	Matsuzaka (6–0)	Perkins (0–1)	Papelbon (11)	33,839	24–15
40	May 11	@ Twins	9–8	Blackburn (3–2)	Wakefield (3–2)	Nathan (12)	26,511	24–16
41	May 12	@ Twins	7–3	Hernández (6–1)	Buchholz (2–3)		18,782	24–17
42	May 13	@ Orioles	5–4	Guthrie (2–3)	Beckett (4–3)	Sherrill (14)	38,768	24–18
43	May 14	@ Orioles	6–3	Cabrera (4–1)	Hansen (0–2)	Sherrill (15)	28,939	24–19
–	May 16	Brewers	Postponed (rain) Rescheduled for May 17					
44	May 17	Brewers	5–3	Matsuzaka (7–0)	Suppan (2–3)	Papelbon (12)	37,409	25–19
45	May 17	Brewers	7–6	Hansen (1–2)	Torres (3–1)	Timlin (1)	37,847	26–19
46	May 18	Brewers	11–7	Beckett (5–3)	Villanueva (2–5)		37,204	27–19
47	May 19	Royals	7–0	Lester (3–2) ^{(no-hitter)}	Hochevar (3–3)		37,746	28–19
48	May 20	Royals	2–1	Masterson (1–0)	Meche (3–6)	Papelbon (13)	37,486	29–19
49	May 21	Royals	6–3	Colón (1–0)	Tomko (2–5)		37,674	30–19
50	May 22	Royals	11–8	Matsuzaka (8–0)	Bannister (4–6)	Papelbon (14)	37,613	31–19
51	May 23	@ Athletics	8–3	Harden (3–0)	Wakefield (3–3)		29,057	31–20
52	May 24	@ Athletics	3–0	Duchscherer (4–3)	Beckett (5–4)	Street (10)	33,468	31–21
53	May 25	@ Athletics	6–3	Blanton (3–6)	Lester (3–3)	Street (11)	33,067	31–22
54	May 26	@ Mariners	5–3	Colón (2–0)	Hernández (2–5)		35,818	32–22
55	May 27	@ Mariners	4–3	Putz (2–3)	Timlin (2–3)		30,758	32–23
56	May 28	@ Mariners	1–0	Bédard (4–3)	Wakefield (3–4)	Putz (6)	30,752	32–24
57	May 30	@ Orioles	5–2 (13)	Timlin (3–3)	Bradford (2–2)	Papelbon (15)	46,199	33–24
58	May 31	@ Orioles	6–3	Aardsma (2–1)	Cormier (0–2)	Papelbon (16)	48,281	34–24

June (16–11)
#	Date	Opponent	Score	Win	Loss	Save	Attendance	Record
59	June 1	@ Orioles	9–4	Colón (3–0)	Burres (4–5)		45,031	35–24
60	June 2	@ Orioles	6–3	Johnson (1–2)	Okajima (1–1)	Sherrill (18)	25,711	35–25
61	June 3	Rays	7–4	Masterson (2–0)	Garza (4–2)	Papelbon (17)	37,823	36–25
62	June 4	Rays	5–1	Beckett (6–4)	Jackson (3–5)		37,474	37–25
63	June 5	Rays	7–1	Lester (4–3)	Shields (4–4)		37,639	38–25
64	June 6	Mariners	8–0	Hernández (4–5)	Colón (3–1)		37,757	38–26
65	June 7	Mariners	11–3	Wakefield (4–4)	Batista (3–7)		37,443	39–26
66	June 8	Mariners	2–1	Masterson (3–0)	Green (1–2)	Papelbon (18)	37,198	40–26
67	June 10	Orioles	10–6	Sarfate (4–1)	Okajima (1–2)		37,858	40–27
68	June 11	Orioles	6–3	Colón (4–1)	Olson (5–2)	Papelbon (19)	38,180	41–27
69	June 12	Orioles	9–2	Lester (5–3)	Guthrie (3–7)		38,139	42–27
70	June 13	@ Reds	3–1	Harang (3–9)	Masterson (3–1)	Cordero (13)	38,855	42–28
71	June 14	@ Reds	6–4 (10)	Papelbon (3–2)	Lincoln (0–2)	Hansen (1)	39,154	43–28
72	June 15	@ Reds	9–0	Beckett (7–4)	Bailey (0–3)		39,958	44–28
73	June 16	@ Phillies	8–2	Hamels (7–4)	Colón (4–2)		45,026	44–29
74	June 17	@ Phillies	3–0	Lester (6–3)	Moyer (7–4)	Papelbon (20)	45,160	45–29
75	June 18	@ Phillies	7–4	Masterson (4–1)	Kendrick (6–3)	Papelbon (21)	45,187	46–29
76	June 20	Cardinals	5–4	Lohse (9–2)	Wakefield (4–5)	Franklin (10)	37,671	46–30
77	June 21	Cardinals	9–3	Boggs (2–0)	Matsuzaka (8–1)		37,227	46–31
78	June 22	Cardinals	5–3 (13)	López (2–0)	Parisi (0–3)		37,085	47–31
79	June 23	D-backs	2–1	Haren (8–4)	Beckett (7–5)	Lyon (16)	37,694	47–32
80	June 24	D-backs	5–4	Smith (1–0)	Qualls (1–6)	Papelbon (22)	37,867	48–32
81	June 25	D-backs	5–0	Wakefield (5–5)	Johnson (4–6)	Papelbon (23)	37,924	49–32
82	June 27	@ Astros	6–1	Matsuzaka (9–1)	Hernández (0–1)	Papelbon (24)	42,237	50–32
83	June 28	@ Astros	11–10	Brocail (3–3)	Delcarmen (0–2)	Valverde (20)	43,073	50–33
84	June 29	@ Astros	3–2	Brocail (4–3)	Aardsma (2–2)	Valverde (21)	42,066	50–34
85	June 30	@ Rays	5–4	Shields (6–5)	Masterson (4–2)	Howell (2)	34,145	50–35

July (11–13)
#	Date	Opponent	Score	Win	Loss	Save	Attendance	Record
86	July 1	@ Rays	3–1	Garza (7–4)	Wakefield (5–6)	Balfour (2)	31,112	50–36
87	July 2	@ Rays	7–6	Glover (1–2)	Hansen (1–3)	Wheeler (3)	36,048	50–37
88	July 3	@ Yankees	7–0	Lester (7–3)	Pettitte (9–6)		54,677	51–37
89	July 4	@ Yankees	6–4	Beckett (8–5)	Rasner (4–7)	Papelbon (25)	55,130	52–37
90	July 5	@ Yankees	2–1	Mussina (11–6)	Masterson (4–3)	Rivera (23)	54,920	52–38
91	July 6	@ Yankees	5–4 (10)	Rivera (3–3)	Papelbon (3–3)		54,922	52–39
92	July 7	Twins	1–0	Okajima (2–2)	Bass (3–3)	Papelbon (26)	37,912	53–39
93	July 8	Twins	6–5	Aardsma (3–2)	Guerrier (4–4)	Papelbon (27)	37,925	54–39
94	July 9	Twins	18–5	Beckett (9–5)	Hernández (9–6)		37,470	55–39
95	July 11	Orioles	7–3	Burres (7–5)	Buchholz (2–4)	Sherrill (28)	37,779	55–40
96	July 12	Orioles	12–1	Wakefield (6–6)	Liz (3–2)		37,539	56–40
97	July 13	Orioles	2–1	Matsuzaka (10–1)	Cabrera (6–5)	Papelbon (28)	37,344	57–40
98	July 18	@ Angels	11–3	Lackey (7–2)	Buchholz (2–5)		44,260	57–41
99	July 19	@ Angels	4–2	Arredondo (4–0)	Beckett (9–6)	Rodríguez (39)	44,005	57–42
100	July 20	@ Angels	5–3	Oliver (3–1)	Wakefield (6–7)	Rodríguez (40)	44,164	57–43
101	July 21	@ Mariners	4–0	Lester (8–3)	Washburn (4–9)	Papelbon (29)	37,861	58–43
102	July 22	@ Mariners	4–2	Matsuzaka (11–1)	Dickey (2–5)	Papelbon (30)	38,425	59–43
103	July 23	@ Mariners	6–3 (13)	Papelbon (4–3)	Green 2–3)	Hansen (2)	43,231	60–43
104	July 25	Yankees	1–0	Chamberlain (3–3)	Beckett (9–7)	Rivera (26)	37,744	60–44
105	July 26	Yankees	10–3	Pettitte (12–7)	Wakefield (6–8)		37,225	60–45
106	July 27	Yankees	9–2	Lester (9–3)	Ponson (6–2)		37,688	61–45
107	July 28	Angels	7–5	Weaver (9–8)	Matsuzaka (11–2)	Rodríguez (44)	37,830	61–46
108	July 29	Angels	6–2	Lackey (9–2)	Buchholz (2–6)		38,110	61–47
109	July 30	Angels	9–2	Saunders (14–5)	Beckett (9–8)		38,042	61–48

August (18–9)
#	Date	Opponent	Score	Win	Loss	Save	Attendance	Record
110	August 1	Athletics	2–1 (12)	Timlin (4–3)	Embree (1–4)		37,832	62–48
111	August 2	Athletics	12–2	Lester (10–3)	Eveland (7–8)		37,838	63–48
112	August 3	Athletics	5–2	Matsuzaka (12–2)	Braden (2–2)	Papelbon (31)	37,317	64–48
113	August 4	@ Royals	4–3	Meche (10–9)	Buchholz (2–7)	Soria (32)	24,378	64–49
114	August 5	@ Royals	8–2	Beckett (10–8)	Bannister (7–10)		22,069	65–49
115	August 6	@ Royals	8–2	Wakefield (7–8)	Hochevar (6–10)		24,294	66–49
116	August 8	@ White Sox	5–3	Buehrle (9–10)	Lester (10–4)	Jenks (23)	38,621	66–50
117	August 9	@ White Sox	6–2	Matsuzaka (13–2)	Logan (2–3)		39,243	67–50
118	August 10	@ White Sox	6–5	Floyd (12–6)	Buchholz (2–8)	Jenks (24)	39,008	67–51
119	August 11	@ White Sox	5–1	Beckett (11–8)	Danks (9–5)		32,634	68–51
120	August 12	Rangers	19–17	Okajima (3–2)	Francisco (2–4)	Papelbon (32)	38,004	69–51
121	August 13	Rangers	8–4	Lester (11–4)	Mendoza (3–6)		37,876	70–51
122	August 14	Rangers	10–0	Matsuzaka (14–2)	Hunter (0–2)		37,856	71–51
–	August 15	Blue Jays	Postponed (rain) Rescheduled for September 13					
123	August 16	Blue Jays	4–1	Halladay (14–9)	Byrd (7–11)		37,834	71–52
124	August 17	Blue Jays	15–4	Marcum (8–5)	Beckett (11–9)		37,415	71–53
125	August 18	@ Orioles	6–3	Lester (12–4)	Guthrie (10–9)	Papelbon (33)	40,429	72–53
126	August 19	@ Orioles	7–2	Matsuzaka (15–2)	Cabrera (8–8)		48,515	73–53
127	August 20	@ Orioles	11–6	Waters (2–0)	Buchholz (2–9)		33,364	73–54
128	August 22	@ Blue Jays	8–4	Byrd (8–11)	Marcum (8–6)		40,181	74–54
129	August 23	@ Blue Jays	11–0	Litsch (9–7)	Lester (12–5)		44,986	74–55
130	August 24	@ Blue Jays	6–5 (11)	Papelbon (5–3)	League (0–2)	Delcarmen (1)	44,521	75–55
131	August 26	@ Yankees	7–3	Wakefield (8–8)	Pettitte (13–10)	Papelbon (34)	55,058	76–55
132	August 27	@ Yankees	11–3	Byrd (9–11)	Ponson (7–5)		55,027	77–55
133	August 28	@ Yankees	3–2	Rivera (5–5)	Masterson (4–4)		55,092	77–56
134	August 29	White Sox	8–0	Matsuzaka (16–2)	Vázquez (10–12)		37,755	78–56
135	August 30	White Sox	8–2	Bowden (1–0)	Buehrle (11–11)		37,751	79–56
136	August 31	White Sox	4–2	Floyd (15–6)	Wakefield (8–9)	Jenks (12)	37,751	79–57

September (16–10)
#	Date	Opponent	Score	Win	Loss	Save	Attendance	Record
137	September 1	Orioles	7–4	Byrd (10–11)	Olson (8–7)	Papelbon (35)	37,565	80–57
138	September 2	Orioles	14–2	Lester (13–5)	Liz (5–4)		37,710	81–57
139	September 3	Orioles	5–4	Masterson (5–4)	Miller (0–1)		37,373	82–57
140	September 5	@ Rangers	8–1	Beckett (12–9)	Millwood (9–8)		30,264	83–57
141	September 6	@ Rangers	15–8	Harrison (7–3)	Wakefield (8–10)		38,208	83–58
142	September 7	@ Rangers	7–2	Byrd (11–11)	McCarthy (1–1)		28,644	84–58
143	September 8	Rays	3–0	Lester (14–5)	Jackson (11–10)	Papelbon (36)	37,662	85–58
144	September 9	Rays	5–4	Wheeler (4–5)	Papelbon (5–4)	Percival (28)	37,573	85–59
145	September 10	Rays	4–2 (14)	Miller (2–0)	Timlin (4–4)	Hammel (1)	38,114	85–60
146	September 12	Blue Jays	7–0	Wakefield (9–10)	Purcey (3–6)		37,398	86–60
147	September 13	Blue Jays	8–1	Burnett (18–10)	Byrd (11–12)		37,341	86–61
148	September 13	Blue Jays	7–5	Masterson (6–4)	Downs (0–3)	Papelbon (37)	37,846	87–61
149	September 14	Blue Jays	4–3	Lester (15–5)	Halladay (18–11)	Papelbon (38)	37,007	88–61
150	September 15	@ Rays	13–5	Matsuzaka (17–2)	Kazmir (11–7)		29,772	89–61
151	September 16	@ Rays	2–1	Wheeler (5–5)	Masterson (6–5)		32,079	89–62
152	September 17	@ Rays	10–3	Balfour (5–2)	Wakefield (9–11)		36,048	89–63
153	September 19	@ Blue Jays	4–3	Delcarmen (1–2)	Tallet (1–2)	Papelbon (39)	34,982	90–63
154	September 20	@ Blue Jays	6–3	Halladay (19–11)	Lester (15–6)	Ryan (32)	40,554	90–64
155	September 21	@ Blue Jays	3–0	Matsuzaka (18–2)	Richmond (0–3)	Papelbon (40)	38,814	91–64
156	September 22	Indians	4–3	Jackson (1–3)	Beckett (12–10)	Lewis (12)	37,828	91–65
157	September 23	Indians	5–4	Wakefield (10–11)	Lee (22–3)	Papelbon (41)	37,882	92–65
158	September 24	Indians	5–4	Aardsma (4–2)	Pérez (4–4)	Delcarmen (2)	37,719	93–65
159	September 25	Indians	6–1	Lester (16–6)	Sowers (4–9)		37,726	94–65
160	September 26	Yankees	19–8	Robertson (4–0)	Pauley (0–1)		37,301	94–66
–	September 27	Yankees	Postponed (rain) Rescheduled for September 28					
161	September 28	Yankees	6–2	Mussina (20–9)	Matsuzaka (18–3)	Rivera (39)	37,091	94–67
162	September 28	Yankees	4–3 (10)	Hansack (1–0)	Veras (5–3)		37,440	95–67

2008 Postseason Game Log

ALDS vs. Los Angeles Angels of Anaheim (3–1)
#	Date	Home	R	H	E	Away	R	H	E	Win	Loss	Save	Attendance	Record
1	October 1	LAA	1	9	1	BOS	4	8	1	Lester (1–0)	Lackey (0–1)	Papelbon (1)	44,996	1–0
2	October 3	LAA	5	11	2	BOS	7	14	0	Papelbon (1–0)	Rodríguez (0–1)		45,354	2–0
3(*)	October 5	BOS	4	7	0	LAA	5	16	0	Weaver (1–0)	Lopez (0–1)		39,067	2–1
4	October 6	BOS	3	9	0	LAA	2	6	1	Delcarmen (1–0)	Shields (0–1)		38,785	3–1
* 12 innings.

ALCS vs. Tampa Bay Rays (3–4)
#	Date	Home	R	H	E	Away	R	H	E	Win	Loss	Save	Attendance	Record
1	October 10	TB	0	4	0	BOS	2	7	0	Matsuzaka (1–0)	Shields (0–1)	Papelbon (1)	35,001	1–0
2(*)	October 11	TB	9	12	0	BOS	8	12	0	Price (1–0)	Timlin (0–1)		34,904	1–1
3	October 13	BOS	1	7	0	TB	9	13	0	Garza (1–0)	Lester (0–1)		38,031	1–2
4	October 14	BOS	4	7	0	TB	13	14	3	Sonnanstine (1–0)	Wakefield (0–1)		38,133	1–3
5	October 16	BOS	8	11	0	TB	7	8	1	Masterson (1–0)	Howell (0–1)		38,437	2–3
6	October 18	TB	2	4	1	BOS	4	10	0	Beckett (1–0)	Shields (0–2)	Papelbon (2)	40,947	3–3
7	October 19	TB	3	6	1	BOS	1	3	0	Garza (2–0)	Lester (0–2)	Price (1)	40,473	3–4
* 11 innings.

== Player stats ==
=== Batters ===
Note: G = Games played; AB = At bats; R = Runs scored; H = Hits; 2B = Doubles; 3B = Triples; HR = Home runs; RBI = Runs batted in; AVG = Batting average; SB = Stolen bases; Bold Indicates team leader in category.

Player	G	AB	R	H	2B	3B	HR	RBI	AVG	SB
David Aardsma	5	1	0	0	0	0	0	0	.000	0
Jeff Bailey	27	50	10	14	1	1	2	6	.280	0
Jason Bay	49	184	39	54	12	2	9	37	.293	3
Josh Beckett	2	6	0	0	0	0	0	0	.000	0
Chris Carter	9	18	5	6	0	0	0	3	.333	0
Sean Casey	69	199	14	64	14	0	0	17	.322	1
Kevin Cash	61	142	11	32	7	0	3	15	.225	0
Bartolo Colón	1	2	0	0	0	0	0	0	.000	0
Alex Cora	75	152	14	41	8	2	0	9	.270	1
Coco Crisp	118	361	55	102	18	3	7	41	.283	20
Manny Delcarmen	4	0	0	0	0	0	0	0	.000	0
J. D. Drew	109	368	79	103	23	4	19	64	.280	4
Jacoby Ellsbury	145	554	98	155	22	7	9	47	.280	50*
Craig Hansen	4	0	0	0	0	0	0	0	.000	0
Mark Kotsay	22	84	6	19	8	1	0	12	.226	0
George Kottaras	3	5	1	1	1	0	0	0	.200	0
Jon Lester	2	5	0	0	0	0	0	0	.000	0
Javier Lopez	3	1	0	0	0	0	0	0	.000	0
Mike Lowell	113	419	58	115	27	0	17	73	.274	2
Jed Lowrie	81	260	34	67	25	3	2	46	.258	1
Julio Lugo	82	261	27	70	13	0	1	22	.268	1
Justin Masterson	2	5	0	0	0	0	0	0	.000	0
Daisuke Matsuzaka	1	2	0	0	0	0	0	0	.000	0
Brandon Moss	34	78	7	23	5	1	2	11	.295	1
Hideki Okajima	5	0	0	0	0	0	0	0	.000	0
David Ortiz	109	416	74	110	30	1	23	89	.264	1
Jonathan Papelbon	4	0	0	0	0	0	0	0	.000	0
Dustin Pedroia	157	653	118*	213**	54**	2	17	83	.326	20
Manny Ramirez	100	365	66	109	22	1	20	68	.299	1
David Ross	8	8	1	1	0	0	0	0	.125	0
Joe Thurston	4	8	0	0	0	0	0	0	.000	0
Mike Timlin	2	0	0	0	0	0	0	0	.000	0
Jonathan Van Every	11	17	0	4	0	1	0	5	.235	0
Jason Varitek	131	423	37	93	20	0	13	43	.220	0
Gil Velazquez	3	8	0	1	0	0	0	1	.125	0
Tim Wakefield	1	3	0	0	0	0	0	0	.000	0
Kevin Youkilis	145	538	91	168	43	4	29	115	.312	3
Team totals	162	5596	845	1565	353	33	173	807	.280	120

=== Pitchers ===
Note: W = Wins; L = Losses; ERA = Earned run average; G = Games pitched; GS = Games started; SV = Saves; IP = Innings pitched; R = Runs allowed; ER = Earned runs allowed; BB = Walks allowed; K = Strikeouts

Player	W	L	ERA	G	GS	SV	IP	R	ER	BB	K
David Aardsma	4	2	5.55	47	0	0	48.2	32	30	35	49
Josh Beckett	12	10	4.03	27	27	0	174.1	80	78	34^{f}	172
Michael Bowden	1	0	3.60	1	1	0	5.0	2	2	1	3
Clay Buchholz	2	9	6.75	16	15	0	76.0	63	57	41	72
Paul Byrd	4	2	4.78	8	8	0	49.0	26	26	10	26
Bartolo Colón	4	2	3.92	7	7	0	39.0	23	17	10	27
Bryan Corey	0	0	10.50	7	0	0	6.0	7	7	3	4
Manny Delcarmen	1	2	3.27	73	0	2	74.1	28	27	28	72
Devern Hansack	1	0	4.05	4	0	0	6.2	5	3	1	5
Craig Hansen	1	3	5.58	32	0	2	30.2	23	19	23	25
Jon Lester	16	6	3.21	33	33	0	210.1	78	75	66	152
Javier López	2	0	2.43	70	0	0	59.1	18	16	27	38
Justin Masterson	6	5	3.16	36	9	0	88.1	31	31	40	68
Daisuke Matsuzaka	18	3	2.90^{a}	29	29	0	167.2	58^{c}	54	94	154
Hideki Okajima	3	2	2.61	64	0	1	62.0	18^{d}	18	23	60
Jonathan Papelbon	5	4	2.34	67	0	41	69.1	24	18	8^{e}	77
David Pauley	0	1	11.68	6	2	0	12.1	17	16	5	11
Chris Smith	1	0	7.85	12	0	0	18.1	16	16	7	13
Kyle Snyder	0	0	21.60	2	0	0	1.2	4	4	2	1
Julián Tavárez	0	1	6.39	9	0	0	12.2	12	9	9	6
Mike Timlin	4	4	5.66	47	0	1	49.1	32	31	20	32
Tim Wakefield	10	11	4.13	30	30	0	181.0	89	83	60	117
Charlie Zink	0	0	16.62	1	1	0	4.1	8	8	1	1
Team totals	95	67	4.01	162	162	47	1446.1	694	645	548	1185

* indicates player led their respectable league in that certain category ** indicates player led all of baseball in that certain category

^aLed team in starters ERA ^bLed in team ERA ^cAllowed fewest runs as a starter for the Red Sox ^dLed team in runs allowed. ^eLed team in walks allowed. ^fLed starters in walks allowed.

== Awards and honors ==
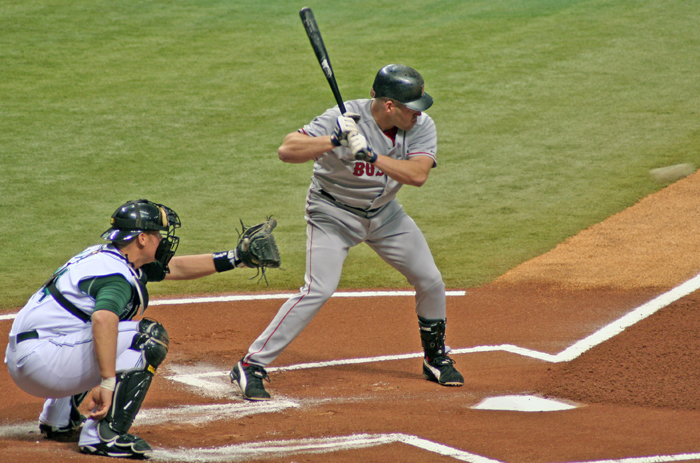
All-star Kevin Youkilis

- J. D. Drew – AL Player of the Month (June)
- Jon Lester – Hutch Award, AL Pitcher of the Month (July, September), AL Player of the Week (May 19–25)
- Dustin Pedroia – American League MVP, Silver Slugger Award (2B), Gold Glove Award (2B)
- Manny Ramirez – AL Player of the Week (April 14–April 20)
- Kevin Youkilis – Hank Aaron Award, AL Player of the Week (May 5–April 11)

All-Star Game

Starters

- Kevin Youkilis 1B
- Dustin Pedroia 2B
- Manny Ramirez OF
- David Ortiz DH (did not play)
Reserves

- Jason Varitek C
- J. D. Drew OF (MVP)
- Jonathan Papelbon RP

== Farm system ==
Level	Team	League	Manager
AAA	Pawtucket Red Sox	International League	Ron Johnson
AA	Portland Sea Dogs	Eastern League	Arnie Beyeler
A-Advanced	Lancaster JetHawks	California League	Chad Epperson
A	Greenville Drive	South Atlantic League	Kevin Boles
A-Short Season	Lowell Spinners	New York–Penn League	Gary DiSarcina
Rookie	GCL Red Sox	Gulf Coast League	Dave Tomlin
Rookie	DSL Red Sox	Dominican Summer League	José Zapata
