= List of Major League Baseball games played outside the United States and Canada =

Major League Baseball (MLB) has played multiple regular season games outside of the United States and Canada, where all MLB teams are currently or historically based. Beginning with the 2023 season, these games are branded as MLB World Tour.

== List of games ==
To date, major-league regular-season games have been contested in five countries outside of the United States and Canada: Australia (Sydney), Japan (Tokyo), Mexico (Mexico City and Monterrey), South Korea (Seoul), and the United Kingdom (London). In 2008, a series of two spring training games was played in Beijing, China.

The first MLB World Tour games (as they are now known) were contested in Mexico in 1996 and 1999. From 2000 through 2012, eight such games were contested, all in Japan. Two games were played in Australia in 2014, followed by three games in Mexico in 2018. The 2019 season saw a total of eight games played in Japan, Mexico, and the United Kingdom. Following a three-year pause, Mexico and the United Kingdom each hosted a two-game series in 2023. In 2024, MLB teams played two-game series in Seoul, Mexico City, and London.

Exhibition contests, such as preseason games or postseason all-star games, are not included in the list below. Several such contests can be found in the See also section.

| Season | Date | Designated visitor | Score | Designated home team | Attendance | Stadium | City | Country | Ref. |
|---|---|---|---|---|---|---|---|---|---|
| 1996 | August 16 | New York Mets | 10–15 | San Diego Padres | 23,699 | Estadio de Béisbol Monterrey | Monterrey | Mexico | |
| 1996 | August 17 | New York Mets | 7–3 | San Diego Padres | 20,873 | Estadio de Béisbol Monterrey | Monterrey | Mexico | |
| 1996 | August 18 | New York Mets | 0–9 | San Diego Padres | 22,810 | Estadio de Béisbol Monterrey | Monterrey | Mexico | |
| 1999 | April 4 | Colorado Rockies | 8–2 | San Diego Padres | 27,104 | Estadio de Béisbol Monterrey | Monterrey | Mexico | |
| 2000 | March 29 | Chicago Cubs | 5–3 | New York Mets | 55,000 | Tokyo Dome | Tokyo | Japan | |
| 2000 | March 30 | New York Mets | 5–1 | Chicago Cubs | 55,000 | Tokyo Dome | Tokyo | Japan | |
| 2004 | March 30 | Tampa Bay Devil Rays | 8–3 | New York Yankees | 55,000 | Tokyo Dome | Tokyo | Japan | |
| 2004 | March 31 | New York Yankees | 12–1 | Tampa Bay Devil Rays | 55,000 | Tokyo Dome | Tokyo | Japan | |
| 2008 | March 25 | Boston Red Sox | 6–5 | Oakland Athletics | 44,628 | Tokyo Dome | Tokyo | Japan | |
| 2008 | March 26 | Boston Red Sox | 1–5 | Oakland Athletics | 44,735 | Tokyo Dome | Tokyo | Japan | |
| 2012 | March 28 | Seattle Mariners | 3–1 | Oakland Athletics | 44,227 | Tokyo Dome | Tokyo | Japan | |
| 2012 | March 29 | Seattle Mariners | 1–4 | Oakland Athletics | 43,391 | Tokyo Dome | Tokyo | Japan | |
| 2014 | March 22 | Los Angeles Dodgers | 3–1 | Arizona Diamondbacks | 38,266 | Sydney Cricket Ground | Sydney | Australia | |
| 2014 | March 23 | Los Angeles Dodgers | 7–5 | Arizona Diamondbacks | 38,079 | Sydney Cricket Ground | Sydney | Australia | |
| 2018 | May 4 | Los Angeles Dodgers | 4–0 | San Diego Padres | 21,536 | Estadio de Béisbol Monterrey | Monterrey | Mexico | |
| 2018 | May 5 | Los Angeles Dodgers | 4–7 | San Diego Padres | 21,791 | Estadio de Béisbol Monterrey | Monterrey | Mexico | |
| 2018 | May 6 | Los Angeles Dodgers | 0–3 | San Diego Padres | 21,789 | Estadio de Béisbol Monterrey | Monterrey | Mexico | |
| 2019 | March 20 | Seattle Mariners | 9–7 | Oakland Athletics | 45,787 | Tokyo Dome | Tokyo | Japan | |
| 2019 | March 21 | Seattle Mariners | 5–4 (12) | Oakland Athletics | 46,451 | Tokyo Dome | Tokyo | Japan | |
| 2019 | April 13 | St. Louis Cardinals | 2–5 | Cincinnati Reds | 16,496 | Estadio de Béisbol Monterrey | Monterrey | Mexico | |
| 2019 | April 14 | St. Louis Cardinals | 9–5 | Cincinnati Reds | 16,793 | Estadio de Béisbol Monterrey | Monterrey | Mexico | |
| 2019 | May 4 | Houston Astros | 14–2 | Los Angeles Angels | 18,177 | Estadio de Béisbol Monterrey | Monterrey | Mexico | |
| 2019 | May 5 | Houston Astros | 10–4 | Los Angeles Angels | 17,614 | Estadio de Béisbol Monterrey | Monterrey | Mexico | |
| 2019 | June 29 | New York Yankees | 17–13 | Boston Red Sox | 59,659 | London Stadium | London | United Kingdom | |
| 2019 | June 30 | New York Yankees | 12–8 | Boston Red Sox | 59,059 | London Stadium | London | United Kingdom | |
| 2023 | April 29 | San Francisco Giants | 11–16 | San Diego Padres | 19,611 | Estadio Alfredo Harp Helú | Mexico City | Mexico | |
| 2023 | April 30 | San Francisco Giants | 4–6 | San Diego Padres | 19,633 | Estadio Alfredo Harp Helú | Mexico City | Mexico | |
| 2023 | June 24 | Chicago Cubs | 9–1 | St. Louis Cardinals | 54,662 | London Stadium | London | United Kingdom | |
| 2023 | June 25 | Chicago Cubs | 5–7 | St. Louis Cardinals | 55,565 | London Stadium | London | United Kingdom | |
| 2024 | March 20 | Los Angeles Dodgers | 5–2 | San Diego Padres | 15,952 | Gocheok Sky Dome | Seoul | South Korea | |
| 2024 | March 21 | San Diego Padres | 15–11 | Los Angeles Dodgers | 15,928 | Gocheok Sky Dome | Seoul | South Korea | |
| 2024 | April 27 | Houston Astros | 12–4 | Colorado Rockies | 19,934 | Estadio Alfredo Harp Helú | Mexico City | Mexico | |
| 2024 | April 28 | Houston Astros | 8–2 | Colorado Rockies | 19,841 | Estadio Alfredo Harp Helú | Mexico City | Mexico | |
| 2024 | June 8 | Philadelphia Phillies | 7–2 | New York Mets | 53,882 | London Stadium | London | United Kingdom | |
| 2024 | June 9 | New York Mets | 6–5 | Philadelphia Phillies | 55,074 | London Stadium | London | United Kingdom | |
| 2025 | March 18 | Los Angeles Dodgers | 4–1 | Chicago Cubs | 42,365 | Tokyo Dome | Tokyo | Japan | |
| 2025 | March 19 | Los Angeles Dodgers | 6–3 | Chicago Cubs | 42,367 | Tokyo Dome | Tokyo | Japan | |
| 2026 | April 25 | Arizona Diamondbacks | 4–6 | San Diego Padres | 19,630 | Estadio Alfredo Harp Helú | Mexico City | Mexico | |
| 2026 | April 26 | Arizona Diamondbacks | 12–7 | San Diego Padres | 19,671 | Estadio Alfredo Harp Helú | Mexico City | Mexico | |

Notes

- The March 2008 games were known as the MLB Japan Opening Series 2008.
- The Tokyo contest of March 21, 2019, was the last professional game for Ichiro Suzuki, who announced his retirement immediately afterwards.
- The June 2019 games were known as the 2019 MLB London Series.
- The March 2025 games are known as the MLB Tokyo Series 2025.
- There has been one no-hitter: May 4, 2018 (detail).
- There has been one extra innings game: March 21, 2019 (12 innings).

=== Canceled games ===
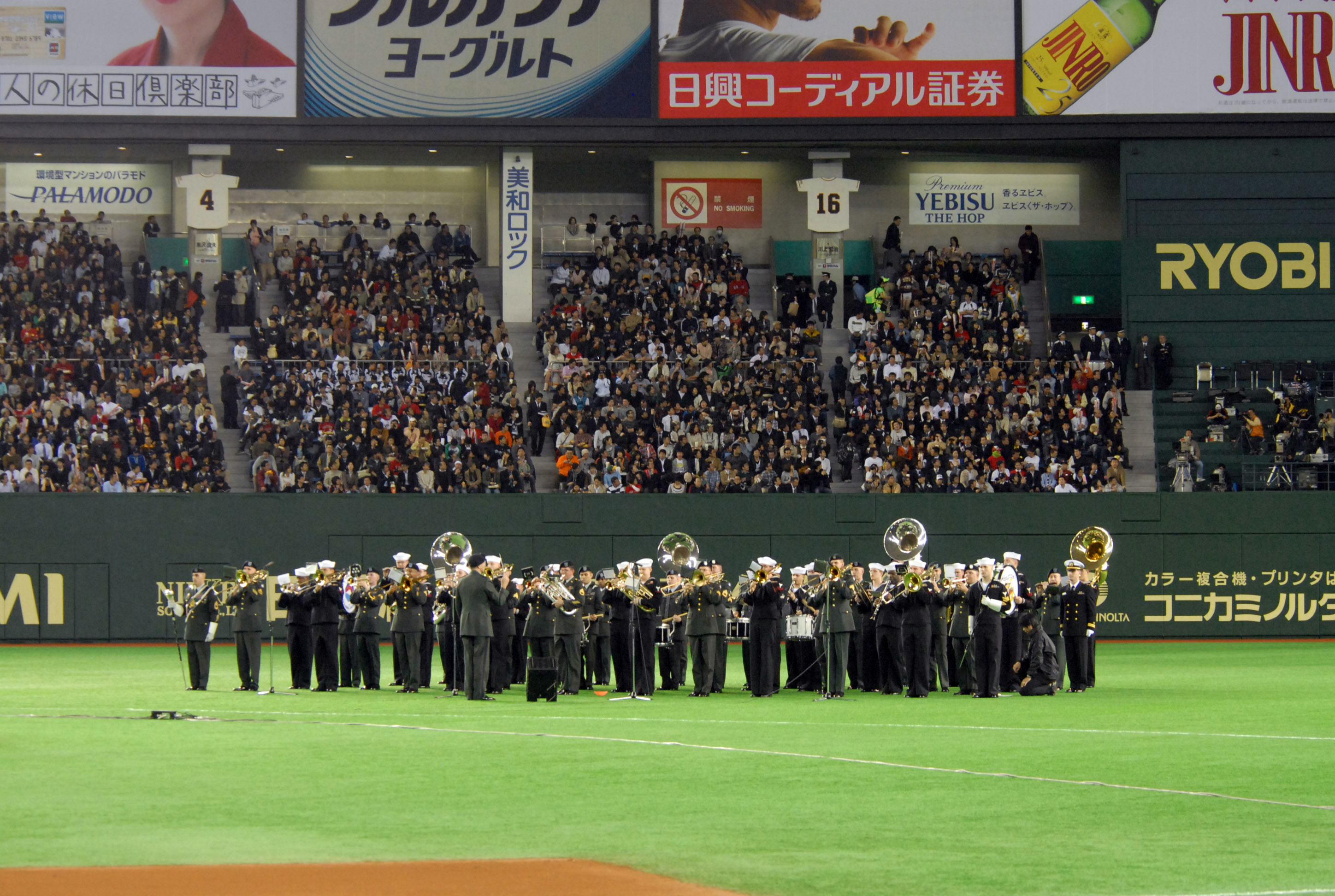
The U.S. 7th Fleet Band and U.S. Army Japan Band perform during the MLB Japan Opening Series 2008.

In May 2019, MLB announced that the Chicago Cubs and St. Louis Cardinals would play a two-game series in London in June 2020, to be known as the 2020 MLB London Series. Additionally, in December 2019, the league announced that the Arizona Diamondbacks and San Diego Padres would play a two-game series in Mexico City in April 2020. These would have been the first regular-season MLB games in Mexico City. Both of these series were cancelled due to the COVID-19 pandemic.

MLB had planned to host games at the Stade de France, just outside Paris, starting in 2025. MLB canceled its 2025 Paris series due to being unable to find a promoter for the event and because of scheduling issues that made it impractical to build a field to MLB's standards at the stadium. Plans to hold games during the 2025 season in Mexico City, Mexico, and San Juan, Puerto Rico, which were part of the 2022 collective bargaining agreement, were abandoned in November 2024. MLB cancelled its 2026 London series between the Toronto Blue Jays and New York Yankees on June 13 and 14 due to scheduling issues with West Ham Stadium and Fox's previous 2026 FIFA World Cup broadcast commitments.

== Games played in Puerto Rico ==
Estadio Hiram Bithorn in San Juan, Puerto Rico, has hosted 49 MLB games since 2001. As Puerto Rico is a United States commonwealth, these games are not included in the above table.

The Montreal Expos played 43 "home" games at Estadio Hiram Bithorn during 2003 and 2004.

Excluding Expos games, below is a list of neutral-site games played in Puerto Rico:

| Season | Date | Designated visitor | Score | Designated home team | Attendance | Stadium | City | Country | Ref |
|---|---|---|---|---|---|---|---|---|---|
| 2001 | April 1 | Texas Rangers | 1–8 | Toronto Blue Jays | 19,891 | Estadio Hiram Bithorn | San Juan | Puerto Rico | |
| 2010 | June 28 | New York Mets | 3–10 | Florida Marlins | 18,073 | Estadio Hiram Bithorn | San Juan | Puerto Rico | |
| 2010 | June 29 | New York Mets | 6–7 | Florida Marlins | 18,373 | Estadio Hiram Bithorn | San Juan | Puerto Rico | |
| 2010 | June 30 | New York Mets | 6–5 | Florida Marlins | 19,232 | Estadio Hiram Bithorn | San Juan | Puerto Rico | |
| 2018 | April 17 | Cleveland Indians | 6–1 | Minnesota Twins | 19,516 | Estadio Hiram Bithorn | San Juan | Puerto Rico | |
| 2018 | April 18 | Cleveland Indians | 1–2 | Minnesota Twins | 19,537 | Estadio Hiram Bithorn | San Juan | Puerto Rico | |

In August 2019, MLB announced a three-game series between the New York Mets and Miami Marlins at Estadio Hiram Bithorn to be played in April 2020. This series was cancelled due to the COVID-19 pandemic.

== MLB World Tour ==
As part of the collective bargaining agreement to end the 2021–22 Major League Baseball lockout, MLB announced a plan to have additional games played internationally, including regular-season games in Tokyo, Seoul, Mexico City, London, and Paris between 2023 and 2026. Beginning with the 2023 season, games outside the U.S. and Canada are branded as "MLB World Tour".

The MLB Mexico City Series was first contested in 2023 at Estadio Alfredo Harp Helú. The San Diego Padres won both games against the San Francisco Giants.

In 2024, the Boston Red Sox and the Tampa Bay Rays played two games during spring training on March 9–10 at Estadio Quisqueya in Santo Domingo; the Red Sox won both games. The Los Angeles Dodgers and San Diego Padres opened the regular season at Gocheok Sky Dome in Seoul, with each team winning one game. The MLB Seoul Series included the first regular season games to be played in Korea. Also during 2024, the Houston Astros won both games against the Colorado Rockies played at Estadio Alfredo Harp Helú in Mexico City on April 27–28, and the New York Mets and the Philadelphia Phillies played two games at London Stadium as part of the MLB London Series on June 8–9, with each team winning one game.

On July 18, 2024, MLB announced that the Los Angeles Dodgers and Chicago Cubs would open the 2025 season at the Tokyo Dome in Tokyo with a two-game series on March 18 and 19. The Cubs and Dodgers each played two exhibition games in Tokyo against Nippon Professional Baseball (NPB) teams prior to the series.

On March 24–25, 2025, the Red Sox concluded their spring training with two games in Monterrey, Mexico, against the Monterrey Sultanes.

On April 25–26, 2026, the Diamondbacks and Padres played a two-game series in Mexico City.

== See also ==
- American Series, major-league and Negro league exhibition games played in Cuba before the 1960 Cuban Revolution
- 1999 Baltimore Orioles–Cuba national baseball team exhibition series, which included a March 1999 exhibition game played in Cuba
- MLB Home Run Derby X, an exhibition tour held since 2022, including appearances in London, Seoul, and Mexico City
- MLB Japan All-Star Series, postseason all-star contests held periodically since 1986
- MLB Taiwan All-Star Series, postseason all-star contests held in 2011
- List of neutral site regular season Major League Baseball games played in the United States and Canada
- List of National Football League games played outside the United States
- List of college football games played outside the United States
