= Gocheok Sky Dome =

Baseball stadium in Seoul, South Korea

- Interactive map of Gocheok Sky Dome
- Location: 430, Gyeongin-ro, Gocheok-dong, Guro-gu, Seoul, South Korea
- Coordinates: 37°29′53.6″N 126°52′02.1″E
- Owner: City of Seoul
- Operator: Seoul Metropolitan Facilities Management Corporation
- Capacity: 16,744 (baseball)
- Surface: Artificial turf
- Field size: Left Field – 99 metres (325 ft) Right Field – 99 metres (325 ft); Center Field – 122 metres (400 ft) Outfield Fence Height – 3.8 metres (12 ft)

Construction
- Groundbreaking: February 2009
- Built: 2009–2015
- Opened: 15 September 2015
- Cost: 240 billion won
- Architects: Ilgeon Architects; ATEC Architects
- Main contractors: Hyundai Development Company; Hanjin Heavy Industries; Sungjee Construction

Tenant
- Nexen / Kiwoom Heroes (2016–present)

The Gocheok Sky Dome (Korean: 고척스카이돔) is a domed baseball stadium in Gocheok-dong, Seoul, South Korea. It is the home ballpark of KBO club Kiwoom Heroes. The stadium is primarily used for baseball and has a capacity for 16,744 spectators for baseball games. The stadium replaced Dongdaemun Baseball Stadium and opened on 15 September 2015. It also serves as a concert venue, with a capacity for around 25,000 spectators.

== History ==
In 2017, Gocheok Dome hosted the first round of the 2017 World Baseball Classic, featuring host nations South Korea, Taiwan, Netherlands, and Israel.

In 2019, Gocheok Dome hosted the opening round of Group C at the 2019 WBSC Premier 12. South Korea, Cuba, Australia and Canada competed in Group C, and a total of six matches were held at Gocheok Dome. The South Korea national team advanced to the super round as the top of the group with three wins in the Group C qualifying round.

In 2020, all KBO League postseason games after the first round were played at Gocheok Dome due to cold weather.

The venue hosted the final of the 2023 League of Legends World Championship between T1 and Weibo Gaming on 19 November 2023.

The stadium hosted the opening series of the 2024 MLB season between the Los Angeles Dodgers and San Diego Padres in March 2024. The MLB Seoul Series, as part of the MLB World Tour, included the first MLB regular season games played in South Korea.
