= MLB London Series =

Major League Baseball series in London

- Logo of the 2024 edition
- Sponsors: Mitel (2019); Capital One (2023)
- Played series: 2019, 2023, 2024
- Planned series: TBD
- Site: London Stadium; London, UK
- US television: Fox, Fox Deportes, ESPN and ESPN Deportes
- UK television: BBC Sport and TNT Sports

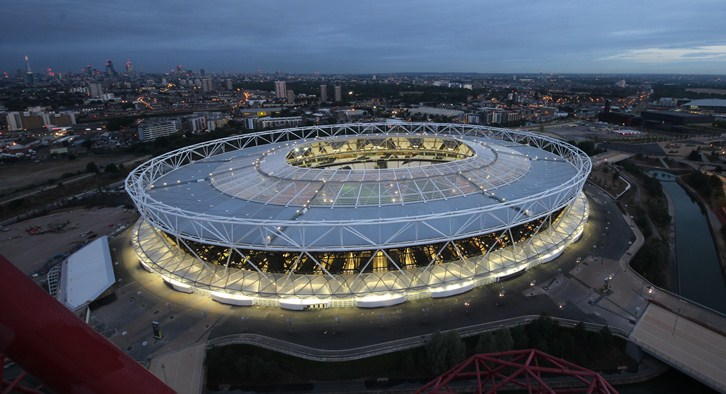
London Stadium in July 2015

The MLB London Series is an arrangement for Major League Baseball (MLB) to play select regular season games at the London Stadium in London, England. The arrangement was initially for two years, 2019 and 2020, which was sponsored by Mitel and branded as Mitel & MLB Present London Series. The 2019 games were the first MLB contests ever played in Europe, and featured the Boston Red Sox hosting two games against the New York Yankees. Two games planned for 2020 between the St. Louis Cardinals and Chicago Cubs were cancelled due to the COVID-19 pandemic. In 2022, the arrangement between MLB and Greater London was renewed for games in 2023, 2024, and 2026. Beginning with the 2023 season, the series is branded as the MLB World Tour: London Series, reflecting the new "MLB World Tour" name applied to games played outside the U.S. and Canada.

== Background ==
On May 8, 2018, MLB announced a two-year agreement to hold baseball games at the London Stadium during the 2019 and 2020 seasons. At that time, outside of the contiguous United States and Canada, MLB had previously held regular season games in Australia, Japan, Mexico and Puerto Rico, and previously held spring training games in China, but had never held any games in Europe. The National Football League (NFL) had similarly held regular-season games in London—primarily at Wembley—under the banner of the NFL London Games. The NFL developed a large fanbase in the United Kingdom, and as of 2018, the games at Wembley had attracted an average attendance of 85,031. The NBA similarly held games in London as part of its Global Games series.

Kelhem Salter, MLB's director of growth and strategy in the EMEA region, noted that Europe was a "key growth market" for the league, and that Londoners were "big event-goers" and frequently sell-out events held there. Unlike the other countries where MLB has held international games, baseball is not as popular and established in the United Kingdom. Salter explained that the league wanted to differentiate its efforts in London from those of other leagues, by emphasizing a "connection to culture and the culture of the specific cities that our teams represent" to engage with new fans. In May 2018, the league began a year-long cultural program entitled "The 108" (referring to the number of stitches on a standard baseball) to promote the London games, encompassing a series of zines profiling MLB teams, as well as "The 108 Sessions" — a series of live concert events at local venues featuring acts representing the teams' cities. The campaign was designed to "build a genuine dialogue and relationship with cultural scenes that reflect those of the MLB home cities."

The inaugural series was played during the 2019 season between the Boston Red Sox and New York Yankees, longtime divisional rivals. A planned series in 2020 was cancelled due to the COVID-19 pandemic. On May 9, 2022, commissioner Rob Manfred and London mayor Sadiq Khan announced a long-term partnership between the league and the city including regular-season games in 2023, 2024 and 2026, along with other major events over a five-year period.

== Series history ==
=== 2019 ===
In June 2019, the New York Yankees and Boston Red Sox played a two-game series, with the Red Sox the designated "home" team. The Yankees won the first game by a score of 17–13, and the second game by a score of 12–8.

=== 2020 ===
The 2020 series was scheduled to take place June 13–14, at the London Stadium, with the St. Louis Cardinals hosting the Chicago Cubs. Due to the COVID-19 pandemic, the games were cancelled. Commissioner Rob Manfred stated that "it was unlikely the events would go forward, and timely cancellation allowed us to preserve important financial resources". The start of the 2020 season was delayed due to the pandemic, and MLB cancelled other planned games in Puerto Rico and Mexico for similar reasons.

=== 2023 ===
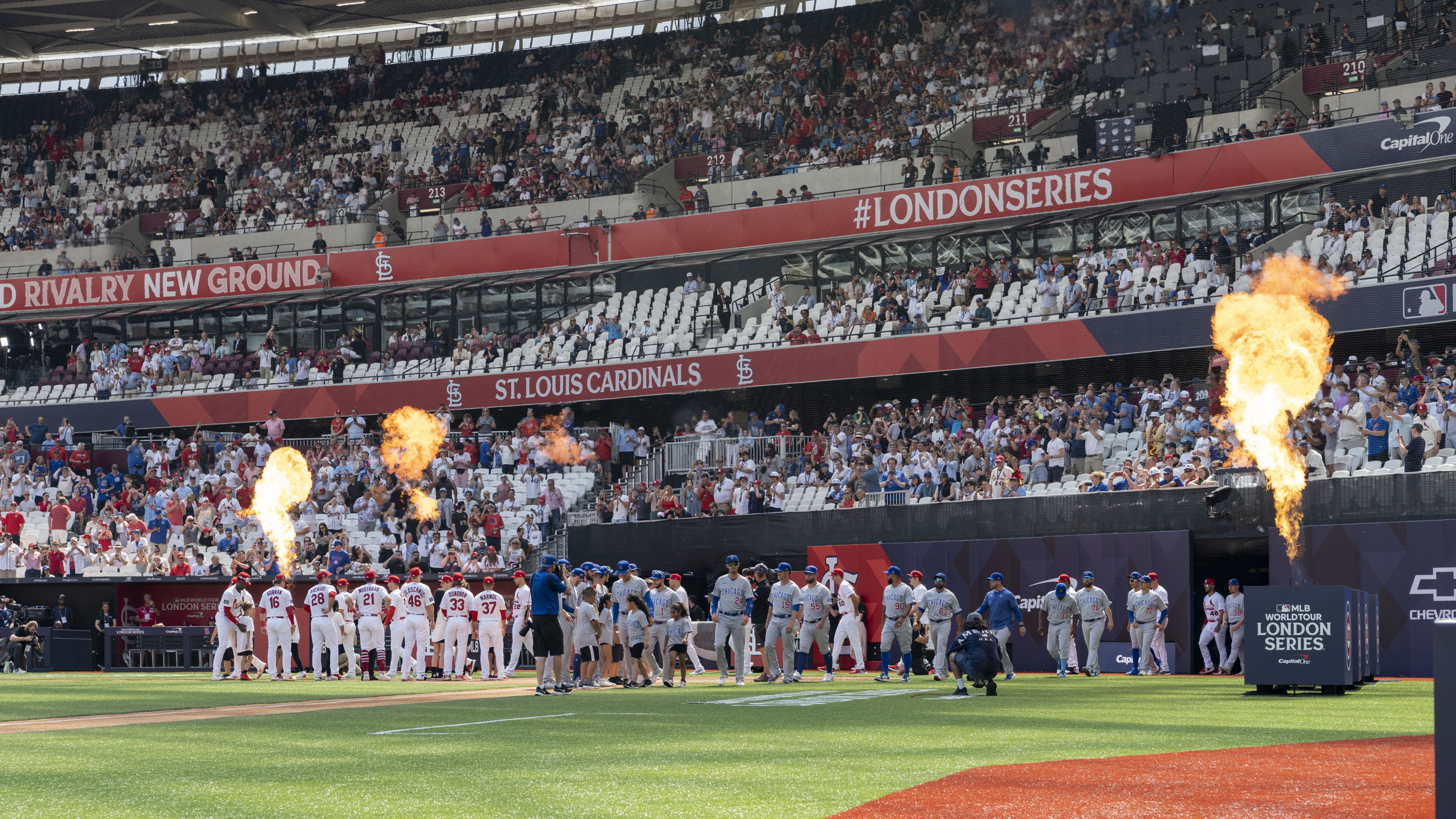
Players and coaches of the Cubs and Cardinals are introduced before the first game of the 2023 series

On August 4, 2022, the first matchup of the extended partnership between MLB and the City of London was announced, with the Cardinals and Cubs scheduled for a two-game series in London on June 24–25, 2023.

In June 2023, the Cardinals and Cubs played a two-game series, with the Cardinals the designated "home" team. The Cubs won the first game by a score of 9–1, and the Cardinals won the second game by a score of 7–5, overcoming a 4-0 deficit after the 1st inning.

=== 2024 ===
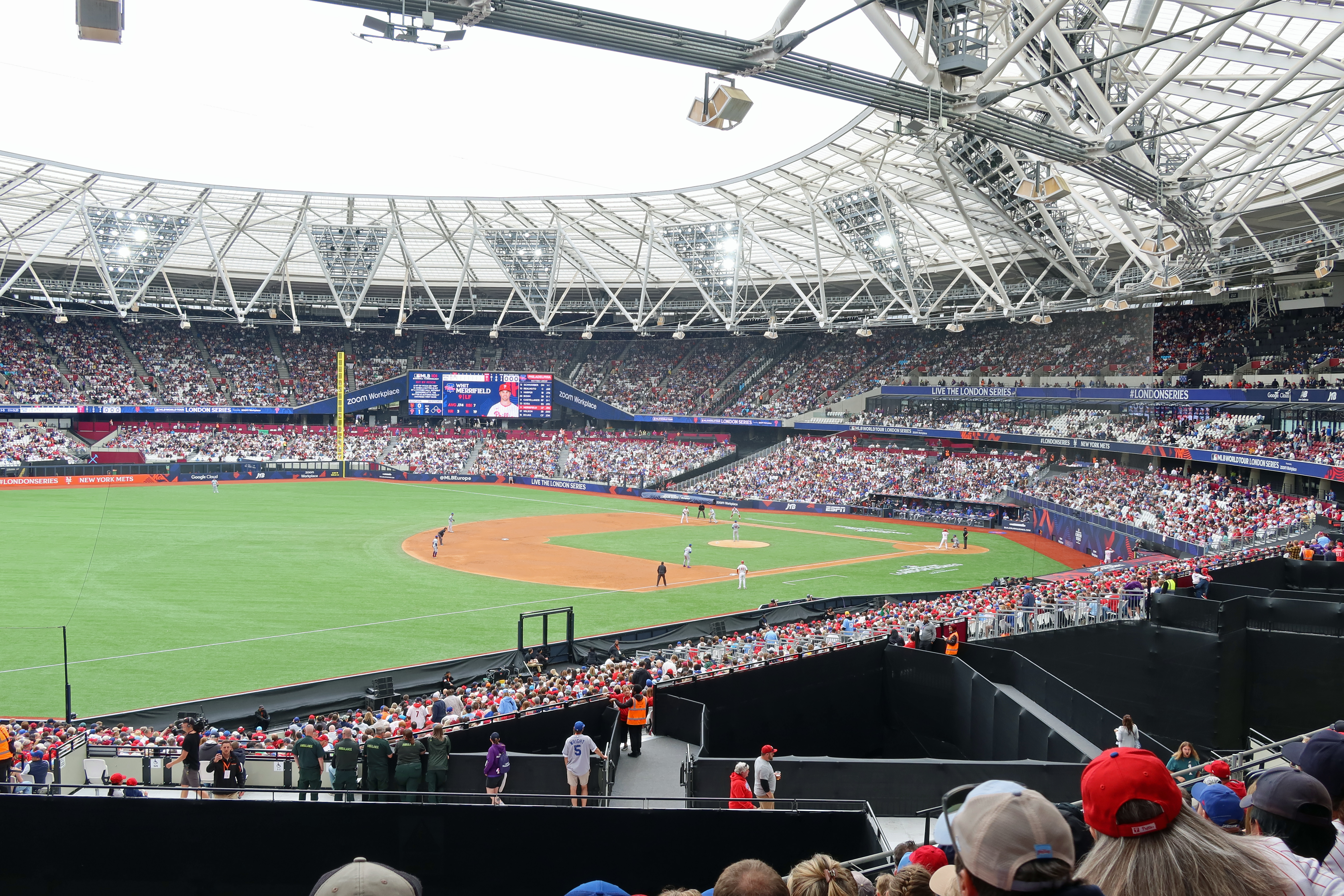
London Stadium during the second game of the 2024 MLB London Series

On June 23, 2023, it was announced that the 2024 series would involve the New York Mets and the Philadelphia Phillies, scheduled for June 8–9, 2024.

The Mets and Phillies played a two-game series, with the Mets as the designated home team for game 1 and the Phillies as the designated home team for game 2. The Phillies won the first game, 7–2, while the Mets won the second, 6–5, including coming back from a 3-0 deficit after the 4th inning and a 4-3 deficit after the 8th inning.

=== 2026 ===
The 2026 series was planned to take place on June 13–14, 2026 and would have featured the New York Yankees and Toronto Blue Jays. However, owing to the late finish of the Premier League season, there was not enough time to convert the London Stadium for baseball for the initial specified dates, while a date later in the summer was not possible owing to Fox's broadcast commitments forthe World Cup. As a result, the series was cancelled in September 2025.

== Venue ==
Locating a venue with the correct dimensions required for a baseball field was difficult, especially as the majority of stadiums in the London region are primarily designed for Association football. MLB officials had evaluated multiple options (including cricket fields such as The Oval), before finalizing the London Stadium as the site. The facility was originally constructed for the 2012 Summer Olympics; in late-2015, it was reported that MLB officials had measured the stadium's dimensions and considered it potentially suitable for baseball, and had negotiated the possibility of holding games there.

MLB developed a plan to adapt the London Stadium for the games to make it resemble an MLB ballpark, via installation of a new baseball field as an overlay on top of the stadium's existing running track and pitch, with a seating configuration to emulate the more "intimate" layout and fan experiences of MLB ballparks. Materials to construct the playing surface include approximately 142,000 square feet (13,200 m^{2}) of FieldTurf, and clay for the pitcher's mound and home plate area sourced from Pennsylvania. As the facility's locker rooms are smaller and suited towards soccer, larger, MLB-style clubhouses were built within the stadium. As done previously at the Toronto Blue Jays' Rogers Centre before its outfield being renovated prior to the 2023 season, or at the Montreal Olympic Stadium (home of the now-defunct Montreal Expos), dimensions from home plate were posted in both feet and meters: 330 feet (100.6 m) to the foul poles and 385 feet (117.4 m) to center field, with a 16-foot (4.9 m) fence. The dimensions were described as being potentially hitter-friendly. The two points in left center and right center where the temporary fences join the wall in center field area are slightly closer than center, marked as 382 feet (116.4 m). As the roof overhangs the home plate area, there is a ground rule that balls hitting the roof are considered dead.

For the 2023 series, the dimensions were extended by a few feet, to 387 feet (118 m) in the power alleys and 392 feet (119.5 m) to center field.

== Broadcasting ==
In the United States, television rights for both series were split between Fox and ESPN. Fox would broadcast the Saturday afternoon game, and ESPN the Sunday afternoon game, with ESPN's broadcast typically produced as a special afternoon presentation of Sunday Night Baseball.

In the United Kingdom, the series was shown by BBC Sport until 2026 and also on TNT Sports.

== Entertainment ==
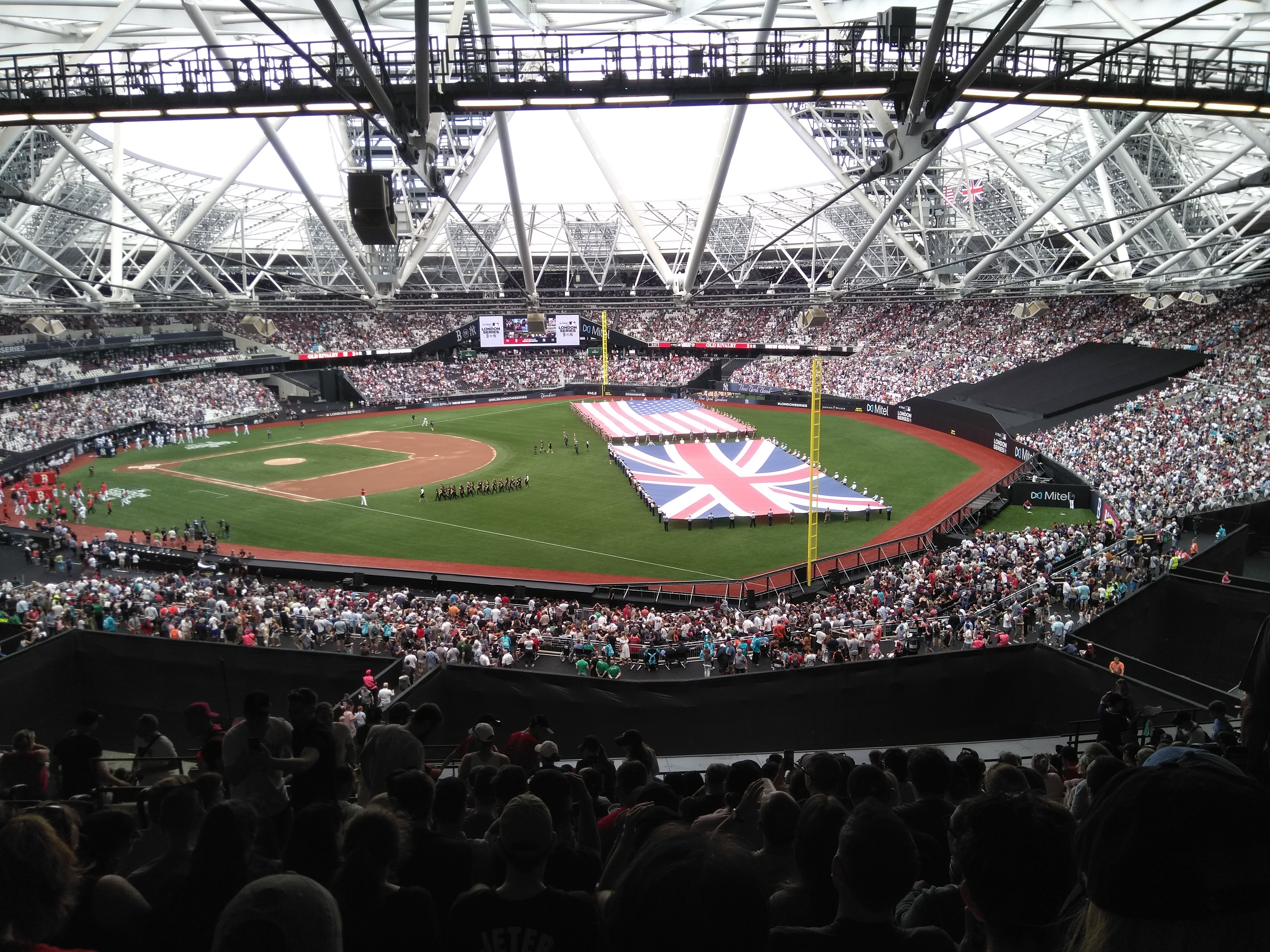
Pre-game at Game 2 of the 2019 series

At the 2019 series, entertainment traditions from Red Sox and Yankees games were represented in-game, including the grounds crew performing "Y.M.C.A." (as is done at Yankee Stadium) and a "Sweet Caroline" sing-along (as is done at Fenway Park). "Theme from New York, New York" was played after both Yankee wins, as is done at Yankee Stadium. Fans voted for Winston Churchill, Freddie Mercury, King Henry VIII, and the Loch Ness Monster to be the entrants in the mascot races. "The Freeze" (Nigel Talton of Fort Valley, Georgia, a member of the Atlanta Braves' grounds crew), a spandex-clad sprinter sponsored by RaceTrac who races fans at Braves games, also appeared.

At the June 29, 2019, game, the national anthems of both the United States and the United Kingdom were performed by The Kingdom Choir; the ceremonial first pitches were thrown by participants of the Invictus Games with Prince Harry, Duke of Sussex, and his wife, Meghan, Duchess of Sussex, in attendance; the mascot race was won by Freddie Mercury; and The Freeze lost to a fan in their footrace.

At the June 30, 2019, game, the national anthems were performed by the Capital Children's Choir; The Freeze defeated a fan in their footrace; and the mascot race was won by King Henry VIII.

== Game results ==
Season	Date	Designated visiting team		Designated home team		Attendance	Ref.
2019	June 29	New York Yankees	17	Boston Red Sox	13	59,659	
2019	June 30	New York Yankees	12	Boston Red Sox	8	59,059	
2020	June 13	Chicago Cubs	—	St. Louis Cardinals	—	—	(Note: Canceled due to the COVID-19 pandemic)
2020	June 14	Chicago Cubs	—	St. Louis Cardinals	—	—	(Note: Canceled due to the COVID-19 pandemic)
2023	June 24	Chicago Cubs	9	St. Louis Cardinals	1	54,662	
2023	June 25	Chicago Cubs	5	St. Louis Cardinals	7	55,565	
2024	June 8	Philadelphia Phillies	7	New York Mets	2	53,882	
2024	June 9	New York Mets	6	Philadelphia Phillies	5	55,074	
2026	June 13	New York Yankees	—	Toronto Blue Jays	—	—	(Note: Canceled due to scheduling conflicts)
2026	June 14	New York Yankees	—	Toronto Blue Jays	—	—	(Note: Canceled due to scheduling conflicts)

== See also ==
- List of Major League Baseball games played outside the United States and Canada
