= Emil Brown =

American baseball player (born 1974)

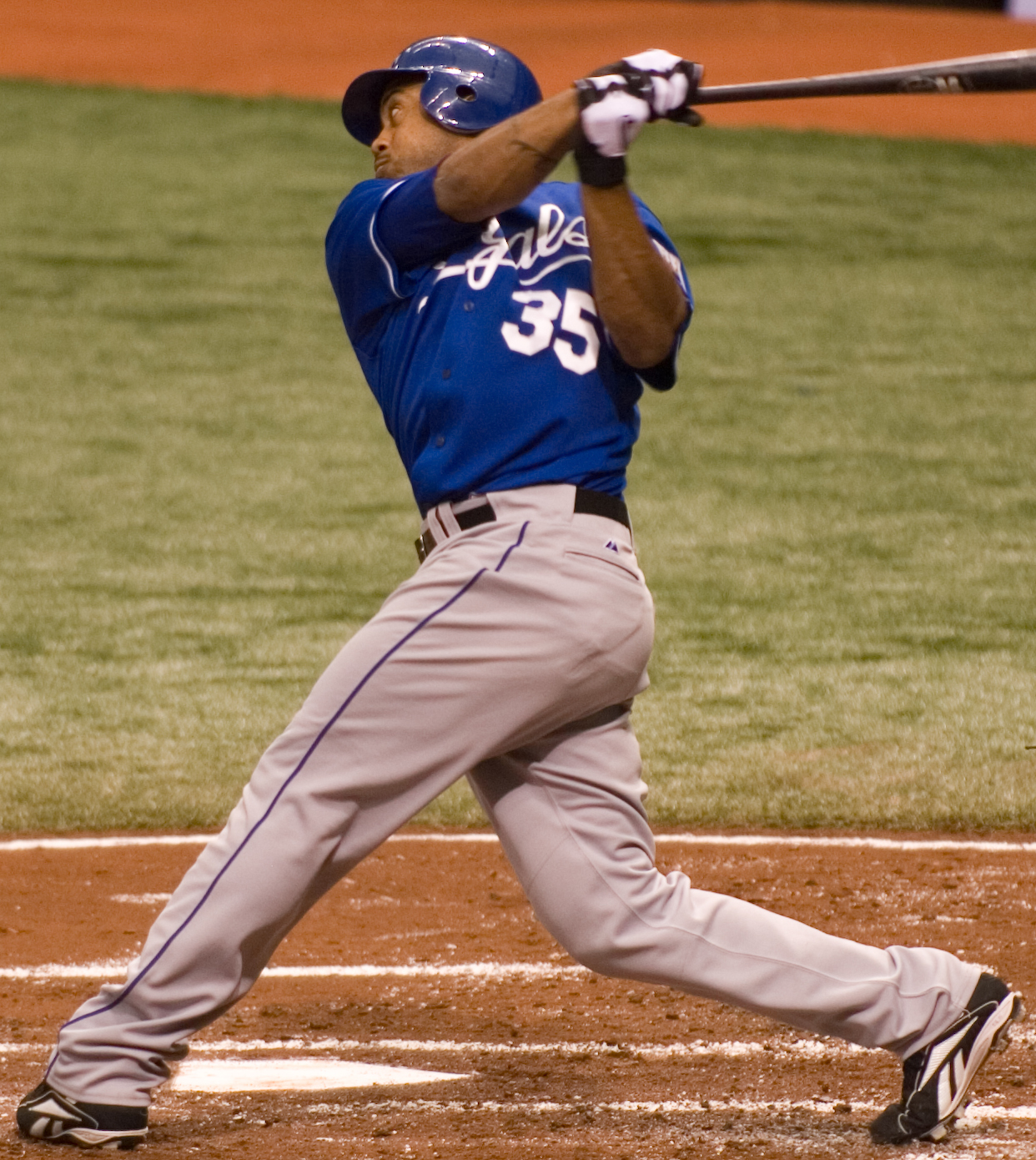
- Brown with the Royals in 2007
- Outfielder
- Born: December 29, 1974 (age 51); Chicago, Illinois, U.S.
- Batted: Right Threw: Right

MLB debut
- April 3, 1997, for the Pittsburgh Pirates

Last MLB appearance
- June 6, 2009, for the New York Mets

MLB statistics
- Batting average: .258
- Home runs: 59
- Runs batted in: 326
- Stats at Baseball Reference

Teams
- Pittsburgh Pirates (1997–2001); San Diego Padres (2001); Kansas City Royals (2005–2007); Oakland Athletics (2008); New York Mets (2009)

Emil Quincy Brown (born December 29, 1974) is an American former professional baseball outfielder. He played in Major League Baseball (MLB) from 1997 to 2009 for the Pittsburgh Pirates, San Diego Padres, Kansas City Royals, Oakland Athletics, and New York Mets.

== Career ==
=== Draft and Pittsburgh Pirates (1993–2001) ===
Brown attended Chicago's Harlan High School and was selected by the Minnesota Twins in the 37th round of the 1993 draft. Brown did not sign with the Twins and attended Indian River State College. He was then drafted by the Oakland Athletics in the sixth round of the 1994 Major League Baseball draft.

He made his Major League debut with the Pittsburgh Pirates in 1997 in a limited role. Brown spent time in the minor leagues and did not hit a home run after that season until 2000, when he hit 3 home runs during the season. He then became the everyday center fielder during the 2001 season and was considered a five-tool prospect but couldn't manage to capitalize on his potential. In sporadic playing time in parts of five seasons, Brown hit .205 with the Pirates, with an on-base percentage of .295.

=== San Diego Padres and minor leagues (2001–2004) ===
Brown was traded to the San Diego Padres in 2001 and appeared in 13 games with the major league club.

Brown did not play in the majors from 2002-2004. He spent time in the Tampa Bay Devil Rays, Cincinnati Reds, Houston Astros, and St. Louis Cardinals organizations. He also played in the Mexican League in 2004.

=== Kansas City Royals and Breakthrough (2005–2007) ===
In 2005, Brown emerged as the everyday starting right fielder for the Kansas City Royals. During this breakout year, Brown hit 17 home runs and drove in 86 with a .286 batting average. Brown had an on-base percentage of .349, the highest of his career to that point. He led the Major Leagues with 12 outfield errors.

During the 2006 season, Brown batted .287 with 15 home runs, 81 RBI, and a career-high .358 on-base percentage. He was ninth in the American League with 41 doubles. His fielding statistics improved significantly, as he reduced his number of errors to three. Brown also had the fifth best range factor among AL left fielders in 2006 and ranked third in zone runs among right fielders. He had a career-high 10 outfield assists in 2006.

On July 30, 2007, Brown shot Kansas City reporter Karen Kornacki in the eye with a plastic pellet gun while Kornacki was talking to his Royals teammate Tony Peña Jr. The Royals called it "an accident". "I feel terrible about it," Brown said afterward. "Karen is one of the nicest persons that I've met, especially as far as the media is concerned...I feel absolutely awful about it."

Despite limited playing time during the 2007 season (113 games and 366 at-bats), Brown led the Royals in RBI for the third straight year. He and Carlos Beltrán are the only Royals to have led the team in RBI for three consecutive years. In 2007, Brown had the third most outfield assists in the AL, with eight, but also committed seven errors in left field (tied with Raúl Ibañez for most in the AL).

=== Oakland Athletics (2008) ===
On January 11, 2008, he signed with the Oakland Athletics. On March 26, 2008, Brown hit a 3-run homer in the A's victory over the Red Sox in the second game of the Opening Series at the Tokyo Dome in Tokyo, Japan. He appeared in 117 games, hitting .244 with 13 home runs and 59 RBI. Defensively, Brown tied his career high in outfield assists by throwing out 10 baserunners.

=== New York Mets and later career (2009–2011) ===
On February 16, 2009, Brown signed a minor league deal with the San Diego Padres and was invited to spring training. On May 28, 2009, Brown was acquired by the New York Mets and assigned to the Buffalo Bisons. Brown was called up in early June and played in three games, only to be designated for assignment on June 6 to make room for Ryan Church on the Mets' roster. After being sent outright to Buffalo, he was released on July 22, 2009.

He played in the Mexican Winter League in the 2010–2011 season.

== Player profile ==
Although he struggled in limited playing time early in his career, Brown was a more effective hitter in his thirties. From 2005 on, he batted .290 against left-handed pitchers and .260 versus right-handed pitchers. Brown's career on-base percentage was .323 and was .340 during his Royals tenure. Although not a pure power hitter, Brown earned a reputation for driving in runs during his time with the Athletics and Royals. He led the Royals in RBI in each of his three seasons in Kansas City.

Defensively, Brown primarily played corner outfield for the Royals and Athletics, but he had played center field earlier in his career. While Brown had good range and a strong throwing arm, he was known for his unusual fielding errors, with Joe Posnanski writing that "one error for Emil has always felt like three or four for someone else" but that "people tend to think he’s a much worse player than he actually is." He led all major league outfielders in errors with 12 in 2005 and led AL left fielders with 7 errors in 2007. However, Brown was among the league leaders in range factor and zone runs in 2006 and threw out 10 base runners in 2006, 8 in 2007, and 10 in 2008. Hardball Times writer Dave Studeman considered Brown one of the best defensive left fielders of 2007.

Mike Sweeney, Brown's teammate with the Royals and A's, said that Brown had been "mis-read over the years" and is "the most gifted athlete I’ve ever played with".

== Post-playing career ==
Brown is a real estate developer in Kansas City. He owns Limeview Development, known for a subdivision called Village West of Holmes in Martin City. The city council initially rejected plans for Village West of Holmes in 2022. After revisions, the subdivision was unanimously approved in 2024.
