= MLB Seoul Series =

Major League Baseball series in Seoul, South Korea

- Logo of the 2024 edition
- Sponsor: Coupang Play
- Played series: 2024
- Site: Gocheok Sky Dome; Seoul, South Korea
- US television: ESPN and ESPN Deportes

The MLB World Tour: Seoul Series, known for sponsorship purposes as the MLB World Tour: Seoul Series presented by Coupang Play, is a series of Major League Baseball (MLB) games played in Seoul, South Korea. It is part of the MLB World Tour series of games played outside of the United States and Canada.

== History ==
In July 2023, Major League Baseball (MLB) announced that the Los Angeles Dodgers and San Diego Padres would open the 2024 season at Gocheok Sky Dome in Seoul, playing the first regular-season MLB games in South Korea.

=== 2024 edition ===
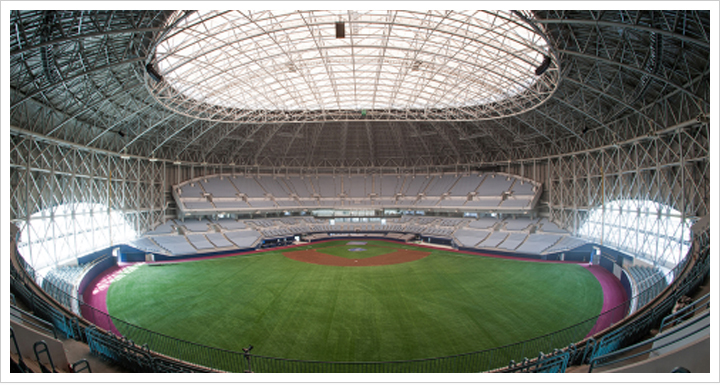
Interior of Gocheok Sky Dome

Prior to the regular-season games, the MLB teams played four exhibition games against Korean teams, which were broadcast locally in the U.S. The Dodgers played the Kiwoom Heroes on March 16, at 8:00 p.m. PDT. On March 17, the Padres played Team Korea at 3:00 a.m. PDT and the KBO's LG Twins at 8:00 p.m. PDT. The Dodgers played Team Korea on March 18 at 3:00 a.m. PDT.

The Dodgers and Padres played two regular-season games on March 20–21, with each team designated as the "home team" once. The Dodgers won the first game, 5–2, and the Padres won the second, 15–11.

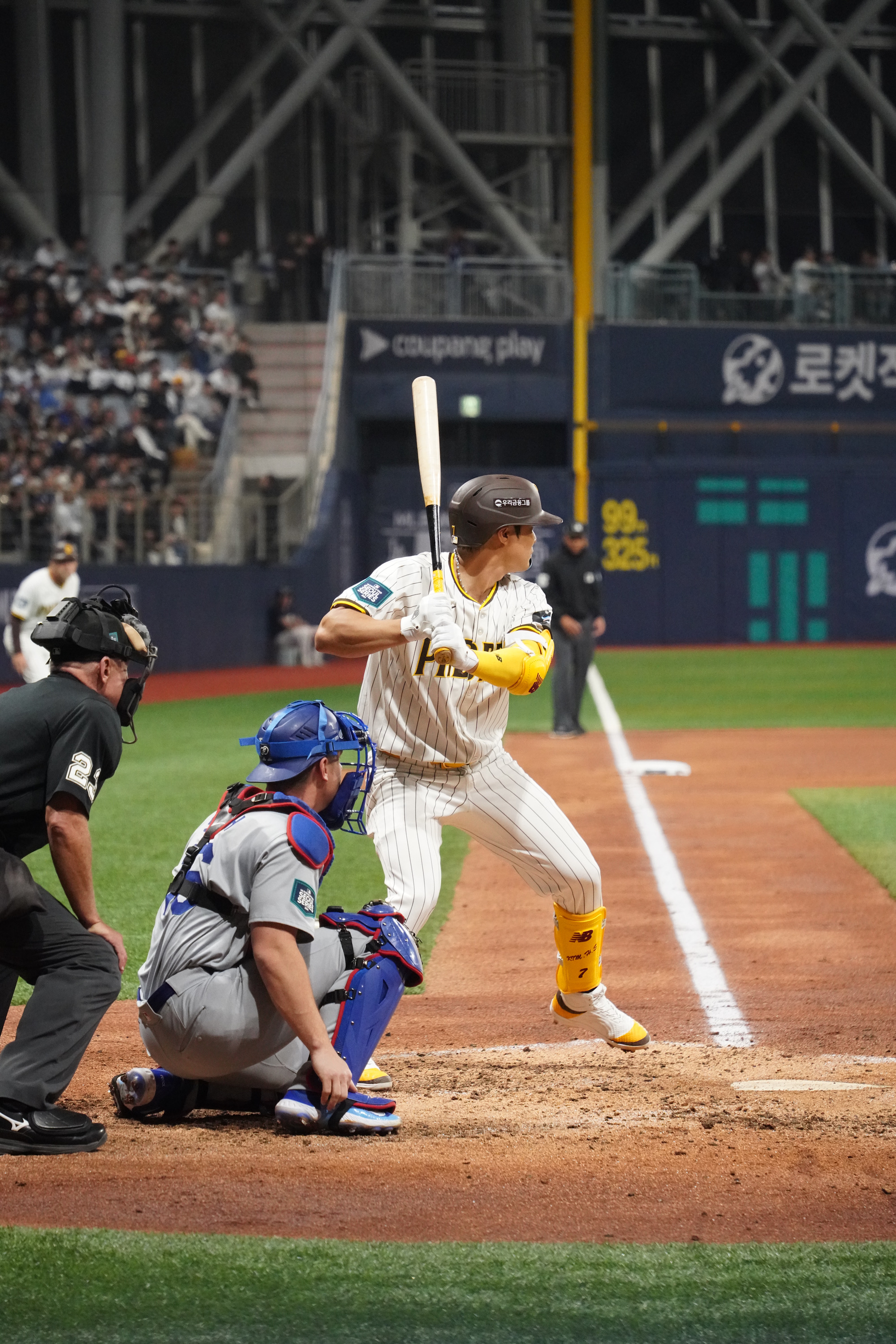
Ha-seong Kim at-bat during the 2024 Seoul Series.

The Seoul series was Shohei Ohtani's regular-season debut with the Dodgers; the team signed him to a long-term contract during the 2023–24 offseason. Ohtani was accompanied by his wife, Mamiko Tanaka; the Seoul series was the first time Ohtani and Tanaka appeared in public together, after the couple married during the preceding month. Local police reported that a person sent a bomb threat by email, threatening to harm Ohtani and other players at the first game. Police found no dangerous or suspicious activity at the stadium, and both games went on as planned.

The games celebrated Asian players past and present in MLB. Ha-seong Kim, a shortstop for the Padres who formerly played in the Sky Dome for the Kiwoom Heroes of the Korea Baseball Organization (KBO), received the loudest cheers of any player. Chan Ho Park, a former Dodgers pitcher who is the first Korean person to play in MLB, threw the ceremonial first pitch. Ohtani attracted many fans to the game. Yu Darvish, a Japanese pitcher for the Padres, received a loud ovation after an inning-ending strikeout.

ESPN and ESPN Deportes broadcast both games, with coverage beginning at 5:30 a.m. Eastern Daylight Time (EDT), or 2:30 a.m. Pacific Daylight Time (PDT). ESPN's nationwide U.S. coverage was blacked out in the Los Angeles and San Diego media markets. SportsNet LA and Padres.TV produced broadcasts for the teams' home markets.

== See also ==
- Baseball in South Korea
- List of Major League Baseball games played outside the United States and Canada
