= Charlie Zink =

American baseball player (born 1979)

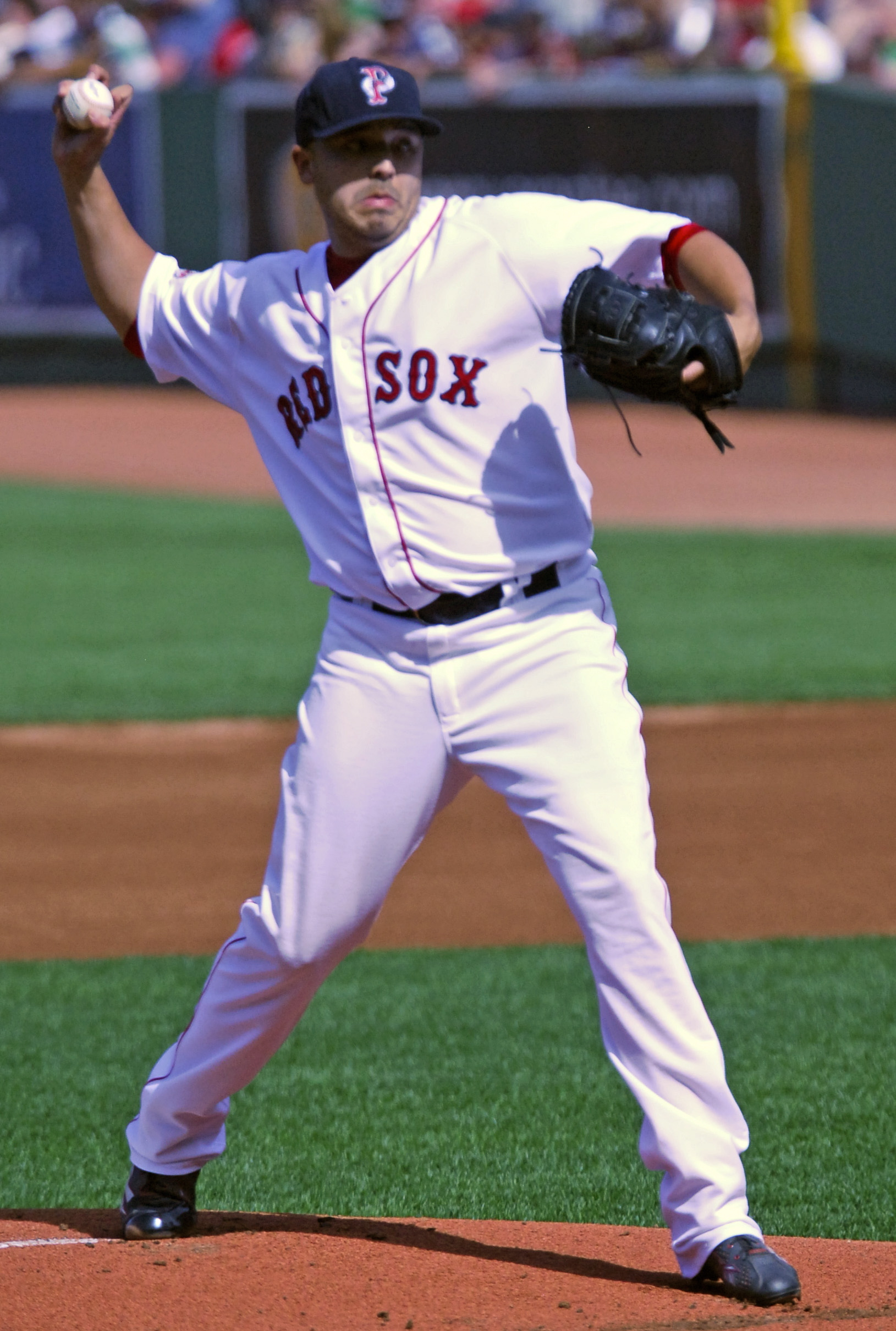
- Zink pitching a knuckleball for the Pawtucket Red Sox in 2009
- Pitcher
- Born: August 26, 1979 (age 47); Carmichael, California, U.S.
- Batted: Right Threw: Right

MLB debut
- August 12, 2008, for the Boston Red Sox

Last MLB appearance
- August 12, 2008, for the Boston Red Sox

MLB statistics
- Games played: 1
- Earned run average: 16.62
- Strikeouts: 1
- Stats at Baseball Reference

Teams
- Boston Red Sox (2008)

Charles Tadao Zink (born August 26, 1979) is an American former professional baseball player. He played in Major League Baseball (MLB) for the Boston Red Sox in 2008.

== Career ==
Zink was signed as an undrafted free agent by the Boston Red Sox in 2002 on the recommendation of former Red Sox pitcher Luis Tiant, who coached Zink at Savannah College of Art and Design. After joining the organization, former Red Sox starting pitcher and fellow knuckleballer Tim Wakefield also spent time with Zink, primarily during their spring break and the off-season.

Zink began his career with the independent Yuma Bullfrogs in 2001. After signing with the Red Sox, Zink was the 2003 Sarasota Pitcher of the Year with a 3.90 ERA over 136 innings. In 2005, he went a combined 10-6 with the Triple-A Pawtucket Red Sox and Double-A Portland Sea Dogs. Zink spent most of the 2006 season with Pawtucket, pitching 23 of 25 games there, posting a 9–4 record and a 4.03 ERA.

Zink split time between Portland and Triple-A Pawtucket in 2007. He opened the season with the PawSox, but was sent down to Portland on May 21. After posting a 9-3 record and a 3.98 ERA in Double-A, Zink was transferred back to Triple-A Pawtucket on August 3. Zink was used solely as a starter in 2007, whereas in previous seasons he was occasionally used out of the bullpen. Zink showed signs of brilliance during his time with Portland during May and June. At one point, he had compiled eight starts of at least five innings pitched and only once allowed more than three earned runs during that stretch. A strained leg muscle caused him to miss a start, but in his first start after returning from the disabled list he surrendered a career high 12 earned runs in four innings. Even with the poor outing, Zink kept his 2007 Double-A ERA below 4.00.

On August 12, 2008, Zink made his major league debut against the Texas Rangers, allowing 11 hits and eight earned runs over 4 1/3 innings pitched. He got a no decision, however, as the Red Sox ultimately won the game, 19–17. To make room for the newly signed Rocco Baldelli, Zink was designated for assignment on January 8, 2009.

Zink signed a minor-league contract with the St. Louis Cardinals on January 14, 2010, but was released after spring training. On April 27, 2010, he was signed by the Minnesota Twins to a minor-league contract and assigned to their AAA affiliate, the Rochester Red Wings. He became a free agent after the season, and on February 9, 2011, he signed a contract with the Lancaster Barnstormers. He appeared in eight games for Lancaster with a record of 2-2 before being released in June.

== See also ==
- List of knuckleball pitchers
