= Craig Hansen =

American baseball player (born 1983)

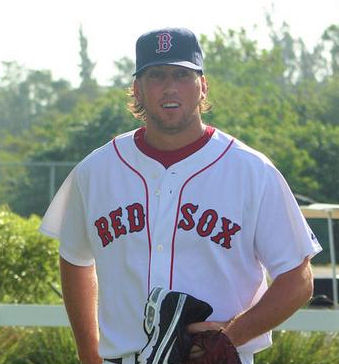
- Hansen with the Boston Red Sox
- Pitcher
- Born: November 15, 1983 (age 42); Glen Cove, New York, U.S.
- Batted: Right Threw: Right

MLB debut
- September 19, 2005, for the Boston Red Sox

Last MLB appearance
- April 19, 2009, for the Pittsburgh Pirates

MLB statistics
- Win–loss record: 4–9
- Earned run average: 6.34
- Strikeouts: 70
- Stats at Baseball Reference

Teams
- Boston Red Sox (2005–2006, 2008); Pittsburgh Pirates (2008–2009)

Craig Robert Hansen (born November 15, 1983) is an American former Major League Baseball (MLB) pitcher who played for the Boston Red Sox and Pittsburgh Pirates between 2005 and 2009.

== College career ==
Hansen's collegiate career began at St. John's University in 2003, where he pitched for the St. John's Red Storm. Hansen selected St. John's over Columbia University, Yale University, and Hofstra University.

While he struggled during his freshman campaign in 2003, Hansen began to establish himself as a closer during his sophomore season in 2004.

In 2004, Hansen played collegiate summer baseball for the Harwich Mariners of the Cape Cod Baseball League (CCBL). A league all-star, he posted 10 saves and 41 strikeouts in 22.1 innings pitched without allowing an earned run. In 2018, he was inducted into the CCBL Hall of Fame.

Hansen posted a 3–2 record with 14 saves in his junior season of 2005, registering 85 strikeouts in 64 innings pitched, a 1.68 ERA, and was named a first-team All-American by Baseball America.

== Pro career ==
=== Boston Red Sox ===
With the 26th pick in the first round of the 2005 Major League Baseball draft, the Boston Red Sox selected Hansen and signed him to a four-year deal valued at $4 million. The Red Sox added him to the 40-man roster, assigning Hansen to a conditioning stint in Fort Myers before sending him to the Double-A Portland Sea Dogs. Hansen joined the Boston Red Sox as a late season call-up, making his major league debut on September 19 against the Tampa Bay Devil Rays. Hansen struck out the first man he faced, pitching a perfect inning with two strikeouts, and would make three more appearances before the end of the season.

After starting the 2006 season in Portland and Pawtucket, Hansen was recalled on June 6 by the Red Sox. On June 26, Hansen earned his first major league win in an extra-inning game against the Philadelphia Phillies. On August 20, Hansen entered a tie game against the New York Yankees in the 10th inning only to allow a game-winning home run to Jason Giambi and a two-run home run to Jorge Posada. Hansen would end the season with a 6.63 ERA. During spring training for the 2007 season, manager Terry Francona suggested that the team may have rushed Hansen to the majors too quickly.

In 2007 at Triple-A Pawtucket Red Sox, he went 3–1 with a 3.86 ERA but did not get a promotion to the eventual World Series Champion Red Sox. Hansen also played in the developmental Arizona Fall League to get extra work in after missing some of the season with forearm tenderness. During the off-season, Hansen underwent surgery in the hopes of correcting the sleep apnea condition that may have affected his stamina and pitching performance.

Hansen reported to Red Sox spring training in 2008 and initial reports suggested that the team was impressed with his performance.

On July 31, 2008, Hansen was traded to the Pittsburgh Pirates along with Brandon Moss in a three-team deal that sent Manny Ramirez to the Los Angeles Dodgers and Jason Bay to the Boston Red Sox.

=== Pittsburgh Pirates ===
On August 27, 2008, the Pirates optioned Hansen to AAA (Indianapolis Indians). This move was made after Hansen allowed four earned runs without recording an out against the Chicago Cubs the previous night. Hansen was recalled to the Pirates on September 2.

On August 8, 2008, Hansen notched his 3rd career save, but first save as a Pirate, holding down a 2-0 Pirates victory over the Phillies. Amazingly, all 3 of Hansen's career saves came in extra innings.

In 2009, Hansen was diagnosed with brachial plexus neuropathy, a rare condition causing pain, weakness, and numbness in the arms, shoulders, and upper back. Recovery is usually complete, but can take as long as five years. Hansen was able to pitch in a limited number of minor league games in 2010, but was not at full effectiveness, and the Pirates released him in early 2011.

=== New York Mets ===
Hansen signed a minor league contract with the New York Mets on July 24, 2012. The Mets released Hansen in March 2013.
