= Hideki Okajima =

Japanese baseball player (born 1975)

Hideki Okajima 岡島 秀樹
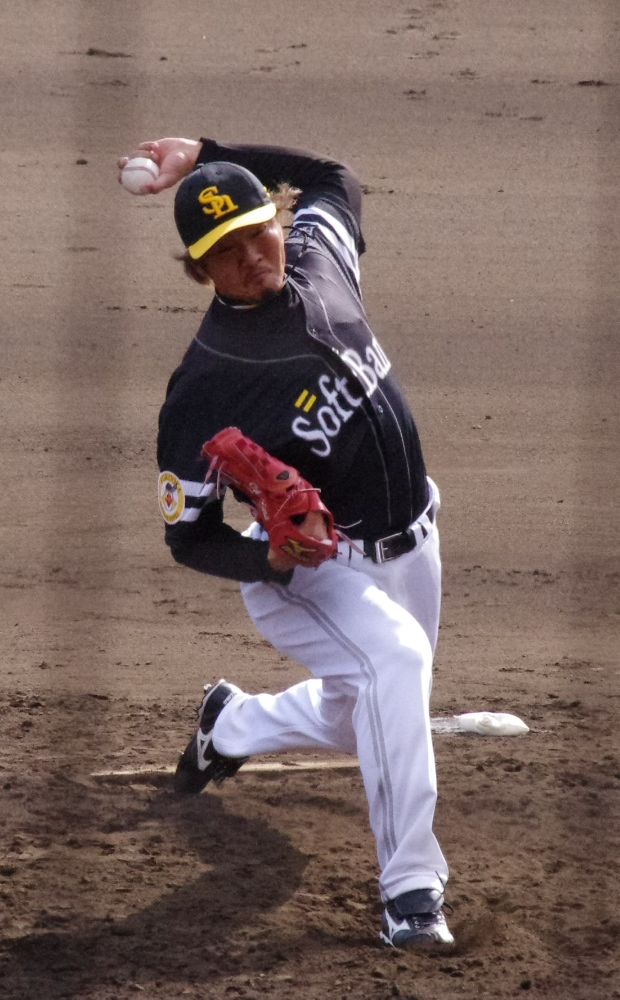
- Okajima with the Fukuoka SoftBank Hawks
- Pitcher
- Born: December 25, 1975 (age 50); Fushimi-ku, Kyoto, Japan
- Batted: Left Threw: Left

Professional debut
- NPB: October 6, 1995, for the Yomiuri Giants
- MLB: April 2, 2007, for the Boston Red Sox

Last appearance
- MLB: June 13, 2013, for the Oakland Athletics
- NPB: October 2, 2015, for the Yokohama DeNA BayStars

NPB statistics
- Win–loss record: 38–40
- Earned run average: 3.19
- Strikeouts: 760
- Saves: 50

MLB statistics
- Win–loss record: 17–8
- Earned run average: 3.09
- Strikeouts: 216
- Stats at Baseball Reference

Teams
- Yomiuri Giants (1994–2005); Hokkaido Nippon-Ham Fighters (2006); Boston Red Sox (2007–2011); Fukuoka SoftBank Hawks (2012); Oakland Athletics (2013); Fukuoka SoftBank Hawks(2014); Yokohama DeNA BayStars (2015)

Career highlights and awards
- NPB: 3× NPB All-Star (2000–2002); 5× Japan Series champion (1994, 2000, 2002, 2006, 2014); MLB: All Star (2007); World Series champion (2007)

Hideki Okajima (岡島 秀樹, Okajima Hideki; born December 25, 1975) is a Japanese former professional baseball pitcher. Okajima pitched for the Yomiuri Giants, Hokkaido Nippon-Ham Fighters, Fukuoka SoftBank Hawks, and Yokohama DeNA BayStars of Nippon Professional Baseball, and the Boston Red Sox and Oakland Athletics of Major League Baseball. Okajima was elected to the 2007 Major League Baseball All-Star Game as a first time All-Star via the All-Star Final Vote. He became the first Japanese-born pitcher to play in the World Series in Game 2 of the 2007 World Series. On July 18, 2016, Okajima announced his retirement.

== Career ==
Okajima attended Higashiyama High School and pitched in the 1994 Koshien National High School Tournament.

=== Yomiuri Giants ===
Okajima was drafted in the third round in 1993 by the Yomiuri Giants of the Nippon Professional Baseball League. Okajima pitched mostly as a setup man, but sometimes played the role of a starter until 1999. When he played with the Giants in Japan, Okajima chose to go by the nickname "Okaji" instead of "Hideki" because Hideki Matsui had preceded him on the Giants.

Okajima became the team's closer in 2000–2001, before returning to his setup role in 2002.

=== Hokkaido Nippon-Ham Fighters ===
Okajima was traded to the Hokkaido Nippon-Ham Fighters right before the start of the 2006 season for two position players, and was a valuable lefty setup man for the team, pitching in 55 games, with a 2.14 ERA. The Fighters won the championship that year. In Japan, Okajima had a career record of 34–32 with a 3.36 ERA.

=== Boston Red Sox ===
Okajima became a free agent in 2006, and signed a two-year, $2.5 million deal with the Boston Red Sox. The deal included a $1.75 million club option for a third year. During spring training in 2007, Okajima was asked what he felt about being relatively anonymous while his teammate and countryman Daisuke Matsuzaka's every move was scrutinized. Okajima stated, "I'm willing to be a hero in the dark."

Okajima allowed a home run to John Buck on his very first pitch in the major leagues. It was the eleventh time in MLB history a pitcher gave up a home run on his first pitch. However, Okajima then proceeded to hold opponents scoreless for nearly two months until the Yankees scored a run off of him via a fielder's choice on May 22. At the start of the 2007 Red Sox season, injuries and poor performances limited the effectiveness of anticipated setup relievers Mike Timlin and Joel Piñeiro. Okajima stepped into the role of primary setup man for closer Jonathan Papelbon and quickly became one of the most dominant relievers in the major leagues. Through the first two months of the season, Okajima cemented himself as the top setup man in the Red Sox bullpen garnering the American League Rookie of the Month for April. Okajima's scoreless streak from April to May 2007 was the longest by a Red Sox left-hander since Bruce Hurst 20 years prior.

Okajima earned his first MLB save on April 20, 2007, against the New York Yankees. After getting a save in his first appearance during a Red Sox–Yankees series, Okajima compared the experience to winning the pennant.

For all of his early success, Okajima remained relatively anonymous in his forays around Boston. While Okajima was taking a cab ride with his wife to a local restaurant, his cab driver gushed about the amazing performance of the Red Sox's newly acquired lefty without knowing that the reliever was in the cab with him.

In Japan, Okajima was known as a gloomy man. However, Okajima revealed more of his humorous side in the United States. On May 17, 2007, Okajima faced the heart of the Detroit Tigers order for the second time in one day to earn his second major league save. When Japanese reporters asked him about facing the same three batters in both games of the doubleheader, he answered with a smile, "I did?"

Okajima made the All-Star team as the winner of the final vote, but did not play in the game; he is the third Red Sox player to make the team this way. Following the All-Star break, Okajima continued to pitch solid and reliable relief innings occasionally closing games for the Sox as they held their place at the top of the AL East. However, the rigors of the MLB season began to catch up with Okajima in the later stages of the season and he began to struggle culminating in a career-high four-run meltdown in a game against the Yankees on September 14, 2007. Red Sox management decided to shut him down following this outing to allow Okajima to relieve the physical and mental fatigue of the longer American season. On his return during the final stages of the regular season, Okajima regained his sharp early season form, pitching scoreless frames to establish himself again as an integral part of the dominant Red Sox bullpen as they headed into the postseason. He was selected to the 2007 Topps Major League Rookie All-Star Team. The selection was the result of the 49th annual Topps balloting of Major League managers.

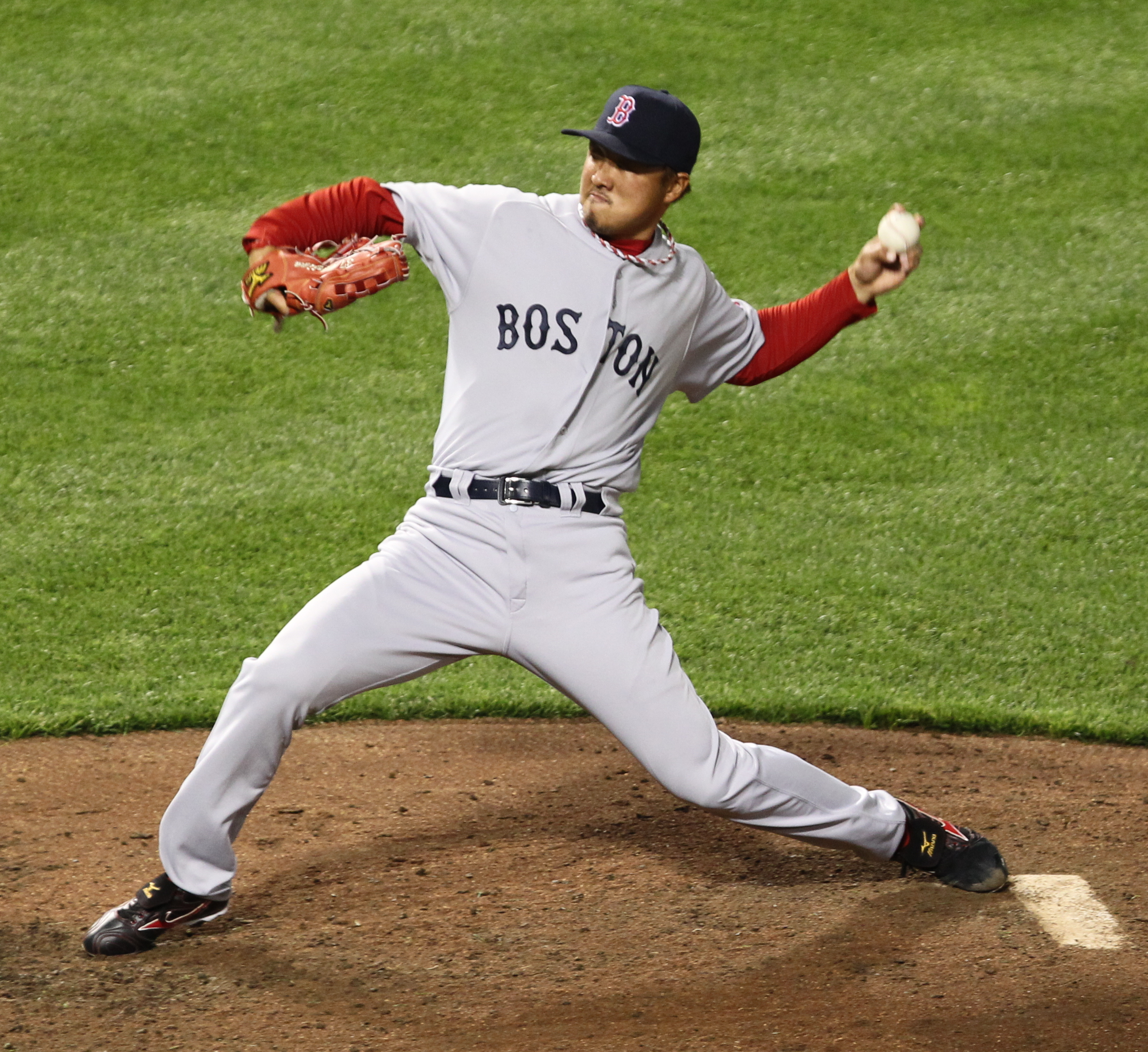
Okajima pitching for the Boston Red Sox in 2011.

Okajima's performance really returned in Game 2 of the World Series against the Colorado Rockies, in which he pitched 2⅓ perfect innings in relief of Curt Schilling, striking out four at Fenway Park. He became the first Japanese born pitcher to play in the World Series. He closed the 2007 postseason with a home run to Garrett Atkins. Okajima helped win the opening game in the MLB Japan Opening Series 2008.

On December 3, 2010, he was non-tendered by the Red Sox, making him a free agent. However, both parties agreed on a one-year deal on January 2. Okajima did not make the 2011 Opening Day roster, starting the season in Triple-A Pawtucket. On April 18, he was called up to the Red Sox. On May 20, 2011, Okajima was designated for assignment. On May 24, 2011, Okajima cleared waivers, and he accepted his assignment to the Red Sox's AAA affiliate, the Pawtucket Red Sox.

The New York Yankees signed Okajima to a minor league contract on December 28, 2011. He also received an invitation to spring training. However, Okajima failed his physical at the beginning of spring training resulting in his release.

=== Fukuoka SoftBank Hawks ===
Okajima agreed to terms on a one-year contract with the Fukuoka SoftBank Hawks on February 26, 2012. He was granted his release from this team on January 29, 2013 to pursue opportunities in MLB.

=== Oakland Athletics ===
Okajima inked a minor league deal with an invitation to spring training pending a physical on February 11, 2013. He was optioned to Triple-A to begin the 2013 season. He had a 2.16 ERA with 18 strikeouts and two walks in 16 2/3 innings during his tenure in Triple-A. He was called up to join the A's 25-man roster on May 17, 2013. He was designated for assignment on September 3, 2013.

=== Second stint with Fukuoka SoftBank Hawks ===
Okajima returned to Japan in 2014, signing a one-year contract with the Fukuoka SoftBank Hawks.

=== Yokohama Bay Stars ===
After the 2014 season Okajima considered returning to MLB but instead chose to stay in Japan, signing with the Yokohama DeNA BayStars in December 2014.

=== Baltimore Orioles ===
Okajima signed a minor league deal with the Baltimore Orioles in February 2015. He was released on March 31, 2016. He retired on July 18, 2016.

== Pitching style ==
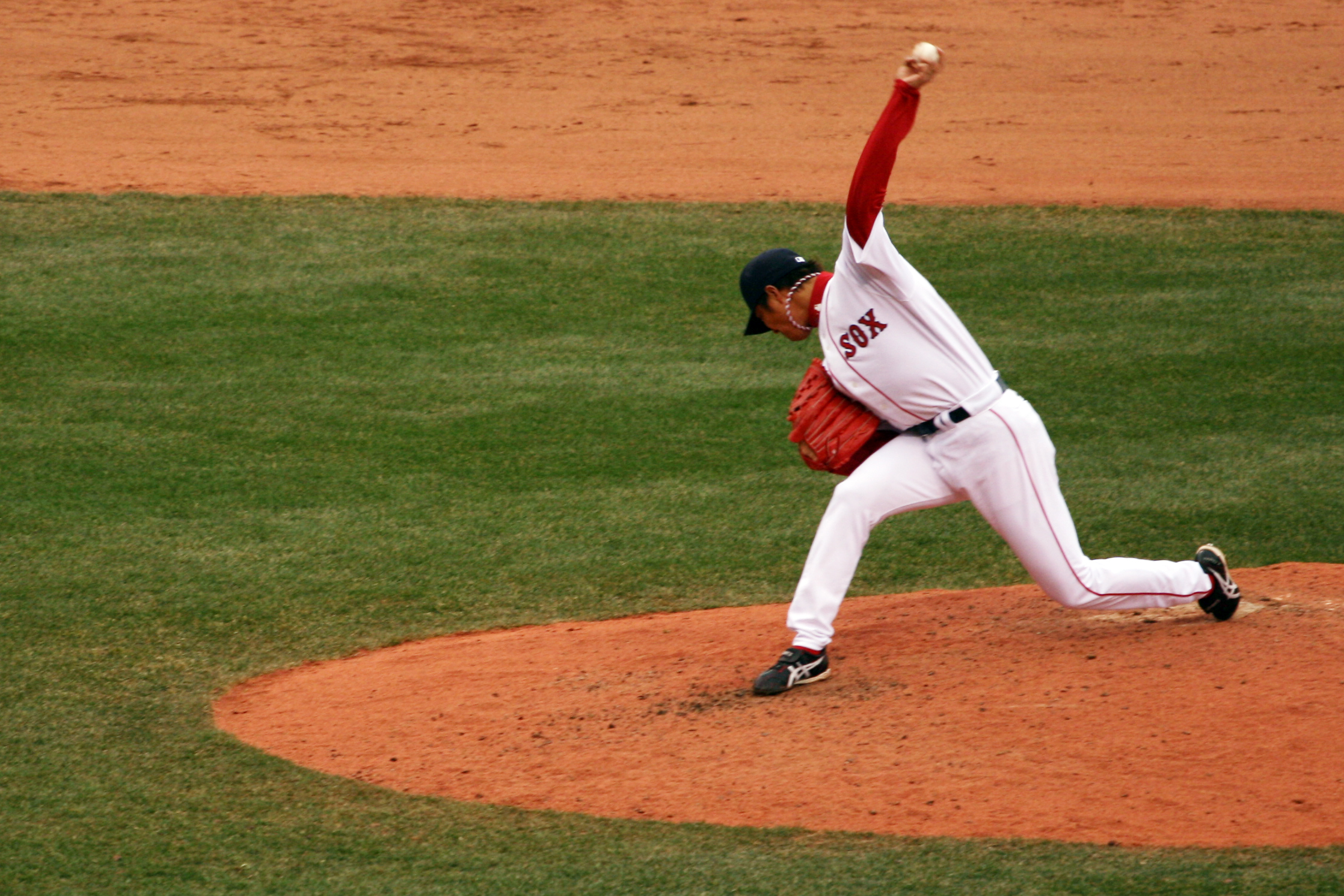
Okajima's unorthodox delivery showing him looking down at the ground towards 3rd base as the ball is released.

Okajima had a distinctive pitching form in which he turned his head downwards just before he released the ball and after release jerked it hard towards third base. These extra movements appeared to give some added velocity to his pitches as they torqued his body towards home plate and reportedly disguised his pitches and caused batters to swing early. Okajima is said to have mimicked the pitching form of a pitcher in Yoichi Takahashi's manga Ace! who torqued his head so much after every pitch that his hat came flying off. Okajima admits, "I was trying to copy the motion. I believed it would make me throw harder."

A part of the Japanese people dubbed this pitching form "Looking the Other Way" after a local version of the rock-paper-scissors game. Initially, numerous coaches in Japan, such as Tsuneo Horiuchi, attempted to change Okajima's pitching form. This all stopped, however, when pitching coach Yoshitaka Katori of the Yomiuri Giants accepted his pitching approach. Early on, Okajima was prone to bouts of wildness — even being booed in his home park for his poor control. After the 2005 season, Okajima was traded to the Hokkaido Nippon Ham Fighters where he changed his pitching form and reestablished good control.

Okajima's pitches were of lower than average velocity, forcing him to develop a more consistent release point to better control them. His fastball was usually in the 85–89 mph range, rarely ever reaching 90 mph. His out pitch in Japan was his sharp rainbow curveball in the 70–75 mph range, which left-handed hitters found hard to hit. He also occasionally threw a circle changeup, a forkball in the 80–84 mph range and a changeup usually around 82–84 mph.

After joining the Red Sox, Okajima displayed such pinpoint accuracy that former teammate Hideki Matsui of the New York Yankees was amazed because, since his time with Okajima in Japan, he never believed Okajima could gain such "great control". Okajima's success in the major leagues against more than one batter in an outing was a departure from his time in Japan, where he was known as a situational lefty brought in to face one left-handed batter in key late-game situations.

During an April 15 rainout in 2007, Red Sox pitching coach John Farrell tweaked Okajima's changeup delivery. The result was a changeup with screwball motion dubbed the "Okie-Dokie" by bullpen coach Gary Tuck. As of May 10, 2007, the Okie-Dokie had been thrown for strikes 79% of the time with hitters swinging through the pitch 14 out of 30 times.

Former major league slugger Gary Sheffield declared Okajima "one of the most impressive lefties I've ever seen" with "stuff I have never seen before from anybody." Former Yankees manager Joe Torre called Okajima "unhittable."

== Personal life ==
Okajima calls Masumi Kuwata his "master." Okajima's wife is sports announcer Yuka Kurihara (栗原 由佳, Kurihara Yuka), with whom he has three sons and a daughter. He met his wife during a champagne/beer celebration after his Yomiuri Giants won the 2000 Japan Series.

Okajima's favorite films are romances including Ghost, Pretty Woman, and Autumn in New York.

Okajima ran the Honolulu Marathon on December 14, 2008, completing the run with a time of 6:10:26 (gun time).

== Awards and recognition ==
- Nippon Professional Baseball All-Star Game 2000, 2001, 2002.
- Japan Series Champion (2000, 2002 Yomiuri Giants and 2006 Hokkaido Nippon Ham Fighters).
- Asia Series Champion (2006 Hokkaido Nippon Ham Fighters).
- Okajima was awarded Rookie of the Month of the American League for April 2007.
- American League All-Star (2007).
- World Series Champion (2007 Boston Red Sox).

== See also ==
- List of Major League Baseball players from Japan
