= Gocheok-dong =

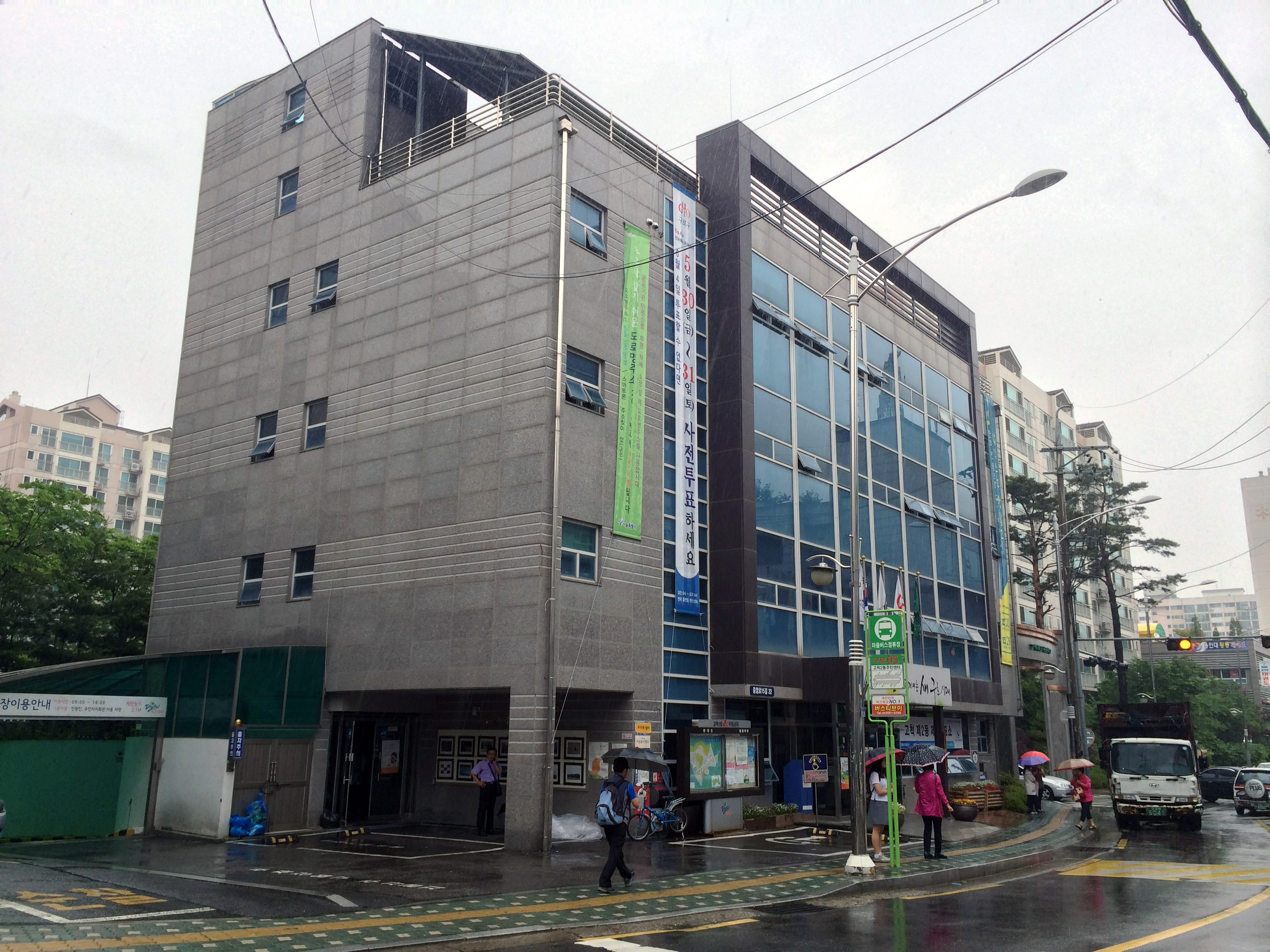
- Gocheok 2-dong Community Service Center
- Interactive map of Gocheok-dong
- Coordinates: 37.503°N 126.859°E
- Country: South Korea

Area
  - Total: 2.16 km^{2} (0.83 sq mi)

Population (2001)
  - Total: 56,513
  - Density: 26,200/km^{2} (67,800/sq mi)

Korean name
- Hangul: 고척동
- Hanja: 高尺洞
- RR: Gocheok-dong
- MR: Koch'ŏk-tong

Gocheok-dong (Korean: 고척동) is a dong (neighborhood) of Guro District, Seoul, South Korea.

== See also ==
- Administrative divisions of South Korea
