= MLB Japan Opening Series 2008 =

Two-game series of baseball

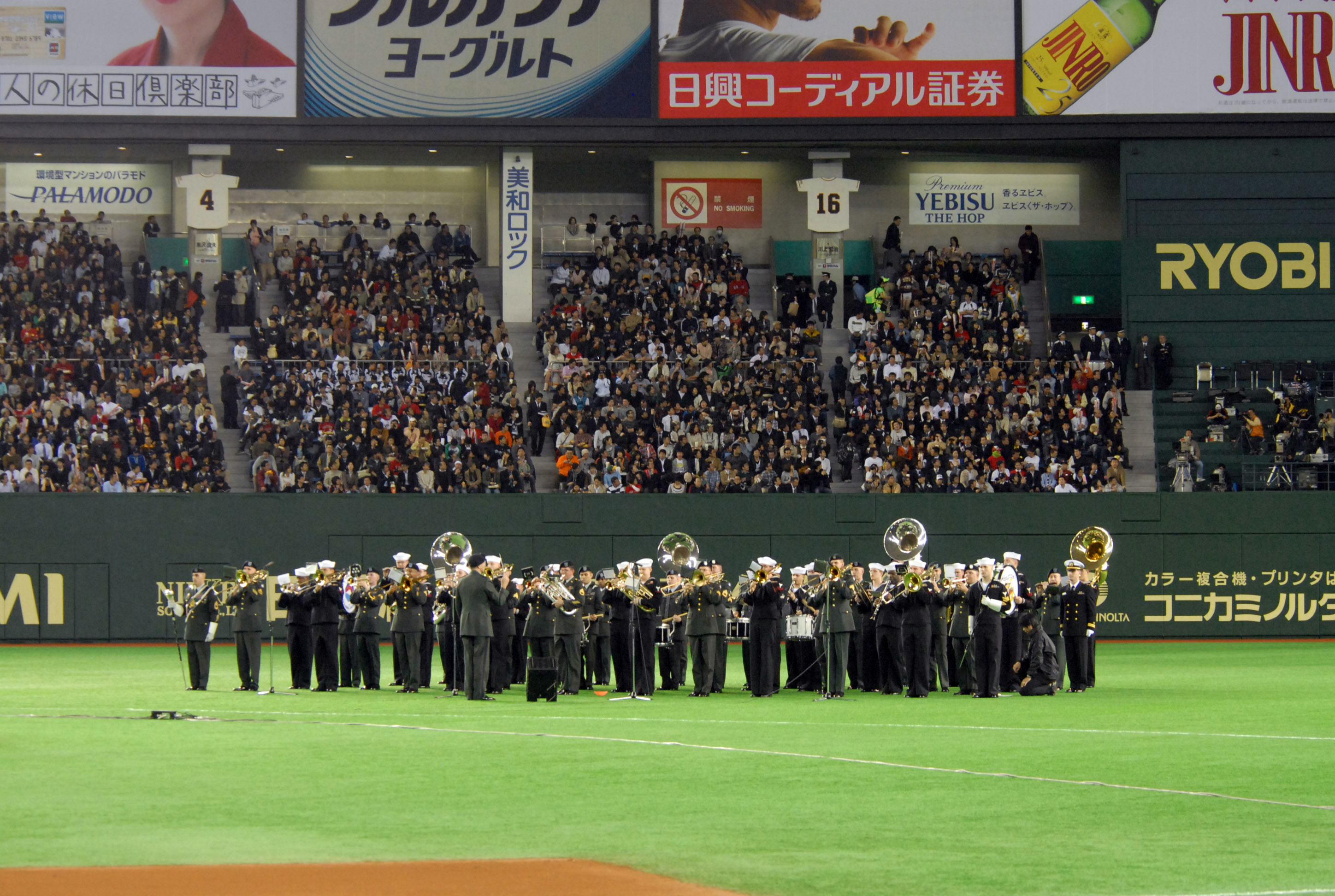
The U.S. 7th Fleet Band and U.S. Army Japan Band perform at the Opening Day game.

The Major League Baseball Opening Series Japan 2008, or MLB Japan Opening Series 2008, was played on March 25 and 26, 2008, in Tokyo, Japan. The 2007 World Series champion Boston Red Sox and the Oakland Athletics split a two-game series played at Tokyo Dome. These were the first games of the Major League Baseball (MLB) 2008 regular season.

== Game 1, March 25 ==
Boston won a closely fought and entertaining opening game in Japan, courtesy of a Manny Ramírez 2 RBI double in the top of the 10th inning. Daisuke Matsuzaka started very shakily, not able to control his curveball as he gave up two runs, including a Mark Ellis home run in the first inning and issuing five walks through his five innings. However, he settled down to retire the last seven batters he faced. Joe Blanton started for Oakland and pitched solidly through the first five innings. However, he lost control of his pitches in the sixth inning, and gave up three runs. Ramirez drove in two with a double and Brandon Moss (a very late replacement for J. D. Drew) drove in the third run with an RBI single. In the bottom half of sixth, Kyle Snyder failed to hold on to the lead, giving up a two-run homer to Jack Hannahan. Both bullpens were then solid, giving up no runs until the ninth inning. Huston Street failed to close out the game, giving up a solo home run to Moss. With Hideki Okajima's scoreless 9th inning, the game was sent into extra innings. Street stayed in the game despite blowing the save in the 9th inning. With a man on second and two out, Oakland chose to intentionally walk David Ortiz, who seemed to have struggled in his earlier at bats. Ramirez then knocked in his third and fourth RBIs with his second double of the game. Jonathan Papelbon came on to close out the game for Boston. With a man on first and one out, Emil Brown hit a double into right field, scoring Daric Barton. However, Brown chose to attempt to advance to third base, but was caught in a rundown, and was tagged out. This resulted in a 2 out, nobody on situation, instead of a 1 out, 1 on situation. Papelbon gave up two further singles, but retired Kurt Suzuki to end the game.

In a side note for fans in the United States, many viewers of the DirecTV service were unable to watch the game on either ESPN2, which had the national game rights, or NESN, which had broadcast rights for the Red Sox in that region. The transponders from which the channels are uplinked to viewers of the standard-definition feed failed some hours before the first pitch at 6 a.m. Eastern time. The screen showed a "searching for satellite signal" error message, then DirecTV put up a static screen apologizing for technical difficulties. Those watching DirecTV on a high-definition feed were not affected. The error was not fixed until approximately noon ET; both networks replayed the game coverage after that, as had been scheduled due to the enormous time difference between the U.S. and Japan.

Team	1	2	3	4	5	6	7	8	9	10	R	H	E
Boston Red Sox (1-0)	0	0	0	0	0	3	0	0	1	2	6	11	0
Oakland Athletics (0-1)	2	0	0	0	0	2	0	0	0	1	5	7	0
WP: Hideki Okajima (1-0) LP: Huston Street (0-1) Sv: Jonathan Papelbon (1); Home runs: BOS: Brandon Moss (1); OAK: Mark Ellis (1), Jack Hannahan (1)

== Game 2, March 26 ==
Oakland comfortably won the second game to level the series at 1-1. Jon Lester gave up four runs in four innings, including a three-run home run to Emil Brown in the third inning. Rich Harden pitched six dominant innings for Oakland, striking out nine and giving up just one run thanks to a Manny Ramírez solo home run in the sixth inning. Jeff Fiorentino added another run with a single in his first at bat of the season, driving in Kurt Suzuki.

Team	1	2	3	4	5	6	7	8	9	R	H	E
Boston Red Sox (1-1)	0	0	0	0	0	1	0	0	0	1	5	0
Oakland Athletics (1-1)	0	1	3	0	0	0	0	1	X	5	9	1
WP: Rich Harden (1-0) LP: Jon Lester (0-1); Home runs: BOS: Manny Ramírez (1); OAK: Emil Brown (1)

== Exhibition Games ==
=== Game 1, March 22 ===
Team	1	2	3	4	5	6	7	8	9	R	H	E
Boston Red Sox	4	1	0	0	0	1	0	0	0	6	9	1
Hanshin Tigers	0	4	0	0	0	1	0	0	0	5	10	1
WP: Clay Buchholz (1-0) LP: Yuya Ando (0-1) Sv: Jonathan Papelbon (1); Home runs: BOS: David Ortiz (1), J. D. Drew (1); JPN: None

=== Game 2, March 22 ===
Team	1	2	3	4	5	6	7	8	9	R	H	E
Oakland Athletics	0	0	0	2	0	0	0	0	2	4	10	0
Yomiuri Giants	0	1	1	0	0	0	0	0	1	3	10	1
WP: Huston Street (1-0) LP: Daisuke Ochi (0-1) Sv: Fernando Hernández (1); Home runs: OAK: Bobby Crosby (1), Jack Hannahan (1); JPN: None

=== Game 3, March 23 ===
Team	1	2	3	4	5	6	7	8	9	R	H	E
Oakland Athletics	2	0	3	0	0	0	0	5	0	10	12	0
Hanshin Tigers	1	0	0	0	1	0	0	0	0	2	7	0
WP: Justin Duchscherer (1-0) LP: Shinobu Fukuhara (0-1); Home runs: OAK: Jack Cust (1), Travis Buck (1), Donnie Murphy (1); JPN: None

=== Game 4, March 23 ===
Team	1	2	3	4	5	6	7	8	9	R	H	E
Boston Red Sox	0	0	0	0	0	4	0	3	2	9	13	1
Yomiuri Giants	1	0	0	1	0	0	0	0	0	2	7	0
WP: Tim Wakefield (1-0) LP: Adrian Burnside (0-1); Home runs: BOS: J. D. Drew (2), Jed Lowrie (1); JPN: None

== See also ==
- List of Major League Baseball games played outside the United States and Canada
