= 2008 Chicago White Sox season =

2008 Chicago White Sox
- American League Central champions
- League: American League
- Division: Central
- Ballpark: U.S. Cellular Field
- City: Chicago, Illinois
- Record: 89–74 (.546)
- Divisional place: 1st
- Owners: Jerry Reinsdorf
- General managers: Kenny Williams
- Managers: Ozzie Guillén
- Television: CSN Chicago; CSN+ WGN-TV and WGN America; WCIU-TV (Ken Harrelson, Darrin Jackson)
- Radio: WSCR (Ed Farmer, Steve Stone); WRTO (Spanish)

The 2008 Chicago White Sox season was the organization's 109th season in Chicago and 108th in the American League. The White Sox won the American League Central title for the first time since 2005. They finished the regular season tied with the Minnesota Twins (88–74) and won a one-game playoff for the division title. They subsequently lost the 2008 American League Division Series to Tampa Bay Rays.

Individual highlights for the White Sox included the breakout season of offseason acquisition Carlos Quentin and the strong rookie season of infielder Alexei Ramírez. Gavin Floyd nearly threw a no-hitter against the Minnesota Twins on May 6, broken up by Joe Mauer's double in the ninth inning. The White Sox set a new home record at U.S. Cellular Field of 54–28 (.658 pct.) breaking the 2003 home record of 51–30 (.629 pct.).

== Offseason ==
Finishing fourth in the American League Central division coupled with having both MLB's lowest batting average and on-base percentage in 2007 prompted the White Sox to make numerous transactions, particularly with West Coast teams, to improve their lineup.

- Infielder Juan Uribe re-signed with the White Sox for a one-year, $4.5 million contract.
- Infielder Orlando Cabrera was acquired from the Los Angeles Angels of Anaheim for starting pitcher Jon Garland.
- Relief pitcher Scott Linebrink was signed to a four-year contract worth $19 million.
- Outfielder Carlos Quentin was acquired from the Arizona Diamondbacks for Minor League infielder Chris Carter.
- Cuban infielder Alexei Ramírez signed with the White Sox.
- Nick Swisher was acquired from the Oakland Athletics for three Minor League prospects: pitchers Gio González and Fautino de los Santos and outfielder Ryan Sweeney.
- Octavio Dotel, former reliever for the Kansas City Royals and Atlanta Braves, was signed to a two-year contract for $11 million.

Other players no longer with the team from the 2007 season are Alex Cintrón, Darin Erstad (signed with Houston), Andy González, Mike Myers, Heath Phillips, Scott Podsednik, and Luis Terrero.

Two coaching staff changes were made, with the hiring of Pittsburgh Pirates third base coach Jeff Cox and bullpen coach Juan Nieves. Cox replaces Razor Shines, while Nieves replaces Art Kusnyer.

== Regular season and post season ==
=== March/April ===
Record: 14–13

- On April 13 against the Detroit Tigers, the Sox hit two grand slams in a game, ones by Paul Konerko and Joe Crede. It was the third time in White Sox history when the team hit two grand slams in a game. The two previous times were (1) September 4, 1995, when Robin Ventura hit two grand slams at Texas and (2) May 19, 1996, when Darren Lewis and Robin Ventura each hit slams at Detroit.

=== May ===
Record: 16–13

- On May 6 against the Minnesota Twins, Gavin Floyd took a no-hitter into the ninth inning, when Joe Mauer hit a double with one out. The only run the Sox allowed was unearned, on a sacrifice fly by Jason Kubel in the fourth inning. The Sox held on for a 6–1 victory. If Gavin Floyd had completed the no-hitter, it would have been the second of three consecutive seasons that the White Sox threw one (Mark Buehrle in 2007 as well as in 2009, which was Mark Buehrle's perfect game).

=== June ===
Record: 17–10

- On June 5, the White Sox drafted University of Georgia SS Gordon Beckham with the eighth overall pick.

=== July ===
Record: 13–12

- On July 31, at the trading deadline, the White Sox traded relief pitcher Nick Masset and minor leaguer second baseman Danny Richar for Ken Griffey Jr. of the Cincinnati Reds.

=== August ===
Record: 17–11

- On August 5 against the Detroit Tigers, in the top of the 14th inning, the Tigers scored two runs via a two-run home run by Plácido Polanco, which made it 8–6. In the bottom of the 14th, the Sox came back with four runs: Jermaine Dye reached base on an error, and the Nick Swisher hit a walk-off three-run homer, making the final score it 10–8.
- On August 14 against the Kansas City Royals, Jim Thome, Paul Konerko, Alexei Ramírez, and Juan Uribe hit consecutive home runs in the sixth inning. This was the first time the White Sox hit four consecutive home runs in an inning, and just sixth time in MLB history (the first since the Boston Red Sox did it on April 22, 2007). The Sox swept the Royals with the final score of 9–2.

=== September ===
Record: 12–15

- The Sox faced three different teams in three consecutive games, which was just the third time this had happened in MLB history (the White Sox and Cleveland Indians each having done so in September 2000). The Sox won all three games: (1) the regularly scheduled season finale against the Cleveland Indians, (2) a game against the Detroit Tigers that had been rescheduled from earlier in the month due to rain, and (3) the tiebreaker game against the Minnesota Twins. Having won, they then faced a fourth team in their next game to begin the playoffs.
- September was the team's first month with a losing record in the season. The month was highlighted with the AL Central tie-breaker game, which took place at U.S. Cellular Field on September 30 vs. the Minnesota Twins. It was Game 163 of the regular season. The White Sox organization called on the fans who attended the game to wear all black. There was almost 100% participation in what the White Sox called "the blackout game." The White Sox won the game 1–0.

=== October ===
Record: 1–3

- The 2008 playoffs saw the White Sox square off with the Tampa Bay Rays in a matchup of the second and third seeds. The White Sox started Javier Vázquez in Game 1. Rays rookie Evan Longoria hit two home runs in a 6–4 win for Tampa. Mark Buehrle started Game 2, which saw the White Sox unable to hold an early lead, eventually losing 6–4. For Games 3 and 4, the series moved to Chicago. The Sox took Game 3 by the score of 5–3, with John Danks getting the victory. The Chicago crowd continued the new "blackout" tradition, but the Rays proved to be too much for the Sox in Game 4, winning 6-2 and taking the series 3 games to 1.

=== Season standings ===
AL Central
Team	W	L	Pct.	GB	Home	Road
Chicago White Sox	89	74	.546	—	54‍–‍28	35‍–‍46
Minnesota Twins	88	75	.540	1	53‍–‍28	35‍–‍47
Cleveland Indians	81	81	.500	7½	45‍–‍36	36‍–‍45
Kansas City Royals	75	87	.463	13½	38‍–‍43	37‍–‍44
Detroit Tigers	74	88	.457	14½	40‍–‍41	34‍–‍47

The Chicago White Sox claim their second A.L Central championship in the last four years.

=== Record vs. opponents ===
2008 American League record Source: MLB Standings Grid – 2008
Team	BAL	BOS	CWS	CLE	DET	KC	LAA	MIN	NYY	OAK	SEA	TB	TEX	TOR	NL
Baltimore	–	6–12	4–5	4–4	4–3	5–3	3–6	3–3	7–11	0–5	8–2	3–15	4–5	6–12	11–7
Boston	12–6	–	4–3	5–1	5–2	6–1	1–8	4–3	9–9	6–4	6–3	8–10	9–1	9–9	11–7
Chicago	5–4	3–4	–	11–7	12–6	12–6	5–5	9–10	2–5	5–4	5–1	4–6	3–3	1–7	12–6
Cleveland	4–4	1–5	7–11	–	11–7	10–8	4–5	8–10	4–3	5–4	4–5	5–2	6–4	6–1	6–12
Detroit	3–4	2–5	6–12	7–11	–	7–11	3–6	7–11	4–2	3–6	7–3	3–4	6–3	3–5	13–5
Kansas City	3–5	1–6	6–12	8–10	11–7	–	2–3	6–12	5–5	6–3	7–2	3–5	2–7	2–5	13–5
Los Angeles	6–3	8–1	5–5	5–4	6–3	3–2	–	5–3	7–3	10–9	14–5	3–6	12–7	6–3	10–8
Minnesota	3–3	3–4	10–9	10–8	11–7	12–6	3–5	–	4–6	5–5	5–4	3–3	5–5	0–6	14–4
New York	11–7	9–9	5–2	3–4	2–4	5–5	3–7	6–4	–	5–1	7–2	11–7	3–4	9–9	10–8
Oakland	5–0	4–6	4–5	4–5	6–3	3–6	9–10	5–5	1–5	-	10–9	3–6	7–12	4–6	10–8
Seattle	2–8	3–6	1–5	5–4	3–7	2–7	5–14	4–5	2–7	9–10	–	3–4	8–11	5–4	9–9
Tampa Bay	15–3	10–8	6–4	2–5	4–3	5–3	6–3	3–3	7–11	6–3	4–3	–	6–3	11–7	12–6
Texas	5–4	1–9	3–3	4–6	3–6	7–2	7–12	5–5	4–3	12–7	11–8	3–6	–	4–4	10–8
Toronto	12–6	9–9	7–1	1–6	5–3	5–2	3–6	6–0	9–9	6–4	4–5	7–11	4–4	–	8–10

=== Game log ===
2008 White Sox game log
March/April (14–13) – Home (7–7) – Road (7–6)

#	Date	Opponent	Score	Win	Loss	Save	Time	Att.	Record	Box
1	March 31	@ Indians	8–10	Betancourt (1–0)	Dotel (0–1)	Borowski (1)	3:21	41,872	0–1	box
2	April 2	@ Indians	2–7	Carmona (1–0)	Vázquez (0–1)		3:31	17,645	0–2	box
3	April 3	@ Indians	2–1	Dotel (1–1)	Westbrook (0–1)	Jenks (1)	2:27	15,785	1–2	box
4	April 4	@ Tigers	8–5	Logan (1–0)	Grilli (0–1)	Jenks (2)	3:10	34,569	2–2	box
5	April 5	@ Tigers	5–3	Floyd (1–0)	Miner (0–1)	Jenks (3)	2:39	42,381	3–2	box
6	April 6	@ Tigers	13–2	Buehrle (1–0)	Verlander (0–1)		2:45	35,230	4–2	box
7	April 7	Twins	7–4	Vázquez (1–1)	Guerrier (0–1)	Jenks (4)	2:55	38,082	5–2	box
8	April 9	Twins	5–12	Baker (2–0)	Danks (0–1)	Bass (1)	3:01	16,499	5–3	box
–	April 10	Twins	Postponed (rain), rescheduled for June 9							
9	April 11	Tigers	2–5	López (1–0)	Contreras (0–1)	Jones (1)	3:13	26,094	5–4	box
10	April 12	Tigers	7–0	Floyd (2–0)	Verlander (0–2)		2:25	29,649	6–4	box
11	April 13	Tigers	11–0	Vázquez (2–1)	Rogers (0–3)		2:34	26,294	7–4	box
12	April 14	Athletics	1–2	Smith (1–0)	Buehrle (1–1)	Street (4)	2:40	20,430	7–5	box
13	April 15	Athletics	4–1	Danks (1–1)	Eveland (1–1)	Jenks (5)	2:18	18,254	8–5	box
14	April 16	@ Orioles	3–1	Contreras (1–1)	Loewen (0–1)	Jenks (6)	2:25	12,080	9–5	box
15	April 17	@ Orioles	5 – 6 (10)	Sherrill (1–0)	Logan (1–1)		3:20	13,676	9–6	box
16	April 18	@ Rays	9–2	Vázquez (3–1)	Niemann (1–1)		3:02	12,379	10–6	box
17	April 19	@ Rays	0–5	Sonnanstine (2–1)	Buehrle (1–2)		2:02	17,613	10–7	box
18	April 20	@ Rays	6–0	Danks (2–1)	Jackson (2–2)		2:34	17,212	11–7	box
19	April 22	Yankees	5–9	Wang (4–0)	Contreras (1–2)		3:44	25,012	11–8	box
20	April 23	Yankees	4–6	Mussina (2–3)	Vázquez (3–2)	Rivera (6)	3:06	27,751	11–9	box
21	April 24	Yankees	7–6	Jenks (1–0)	Chamberlain (1–1)		3:05	27,243	12–9	box
–	April 25	Orioles	Postponed (rain) Rescheduled for April 26							
22	April 26	Orioles	1–5	Burres (3–1)	Danks (2–2)	Sherrill (9)	2:41	23,043	12–10	box
23	April 26	Orioles	6–5	Jenks (2–0)	Bierd (0–1)		3:28	34,757	13–10	box
24	April 27	Orioles	6–1	Contreras (2–2)	Guthrie (0–3)		2:58	29,756	14–10	box
25*	April 28	Orioles	3 – 4 (14)	Castillo (1–0)	H. Ramírez (1–3)	Cherry (1)	4:42	17,367*	14–11	box
26	April 29	@ Twins	1–3	Bonser (2–4)	Floyd (2–1)	Nathan (8)	2:32	20,891	14–12	box
27	April 30	@ Twins	3–4	Blackburn (2–1)	Wassermann (0–1)	Nathan (9)	2:37	19,137	14–13	box
* Completed the game at Oriole Park at Camden Yards on August 25 from the 12th inning on with the same att. number from U.S. Cellular Field.

May (16–13) – Home (6–3) – Road (10–10)

#	Date	Opponent	Score	Win	Loss	Save	Time	Att.	Record	Box
28	May 2	@ Blue Jays	0–2	Marcum (3–2)	Buehrle (1–3)	Downs (2)	2:10	21,057	14–14	box
29	May 3	@ Blue Jays	2–5	Litsch (4–1)	Danks (2–3)	Ryan (4)	2:36	27,778	14–15	box
30	May 4	@ Blue Jays	3–4	Halladay (3–4)	Contreras (2–3)	Downs (3)	2:12	26,247	14–16	box
31	May 5	@ Blue Jays	0–1	McGowan (2–2)	Vázquez (3–3)	Ryan (5)	2:40	16,602	14–17	box
32	May 6	Twins	7–1	Floyd (3–1)	Blackburn (2–2)		2:27	23,480	15–17	box
33	May 7	Twins	1–13	Hernández (5–1)	Buehrle (1–4)		2:32	21,092	15–18	box
34	May 8	Twins	6–2	Danks (3–3)	Slowey (0–2)		3:15	25,193	16–18	box
35	May 9	@ Mariners	4–2	Contreras (3–3)	Silva (3–2)	Jenks (7)	2:23	27,169	17–18	box
36	May 10	@ Mariners	8–4	Vázquez (4–3)	Washburn (2–5)		2:58	33,078	18–18	box
37	May 11	@ Mariners	3–6	Washburn (3–4)	Floyd (3–2)	Putz (3)	3:03	30,346	18–19	box
38	May 12	@ Angels	7–10	Adenhart (1–0)	Buehrle (1–5)	Rodríguez (15)	2:49	38,723	18–20	box
39	May 13	@ Angels	0–2	Shields (2–0)	Dotel (1–2)	Rodríguez (16)	2:40	35,333	18–21	box
40	May 14	@ Angels	6–1	Contreras (4–3)	Shields (2–1)		2:37	37,059	19–21	box
41	May 15	@ Angels	4–3	Dotel (2–2)	Rodríguez (0–1)	Jenks (8)	3:14	41,444	20–21	box
42	May 16	@ Giants	2–0	Floyd (4–2)	Sánchez (2–3)	Jenks (9)	2:50	35,482	21–21	box
43	May 17	@ Giants	3–1	Buehrle (2–5)	Zito (0–8)	Jenks (10)	2:52	37,006	22–21	box
44	May 18	@ Giants	13–8	Thornton (1–0)	Walker (1–2)	Masset (1)	3:01	34,331	23–21	box
45	May 20	Indians	4–1	Contreras (5–3)	Sabathia (3–6)	Jenks (11)	2:50	27,533	24–21	box
46	May 21	Indians	7–2	Vázquez (5–3)	Byrd (2–4)		2:45	38,518	25–21	box
47	May 22	Indians	3–1	Linebrink (1–0)	Laffey (2–3)	Jenks (12)	2:17	28,040	26–21	box
48	May 23	Angels	1–3	Saunders (8–1)	Floyd (4–3)	Rodríguez (20)	2:12	28,156	26–22	box
49	May 24	Angels	0–2	Weaver (4–5)	Danks (3–4)	Rodríguez (21)	2:53	38,434	26–23	box
50	May 25	Angels	3–2	Linebrink (2–0)	Lackey (1–1)		2:05	36,195	27–23	box
51	May 26	@ Indians	6 – 3 (12)	Logan (2–1)	Elarton (0–1)	Jenks (13)	4:02	31,006	28–23	box
52	May 27	@ Indians	2–8	Laffey (3–3)	Buehrle (2–6)		2:50	25,426	28–24	box
53	May 28	@ Indians	6–5	Floyd (5–3)	Betancourt (1–3)	Jenks (14)	3:11	31,740	29–24	box
54	May 29	@ Rays	5–1	Danks (4–4)	Jackson (3–4)		2:46	12,636	30–24	box
55	May 30	@ Rays	1–2	Wheeler (1–3)	Linebrink (2–1)		2:50	14,679	30–25	box
56	May 31	@ Rays	0–2	Kazmir (5–1)	Vázquez (5–4)	Balfour (1)	2:46	36,048	30–26	box

June (17–10) – Home (15–2) – Road (2–8)

#	Date	Opponent	Score	Win	Loss	Save	Time	Att.	Record	Box
57	June 1	@ Rays	3 – 4 (10)	Howell (4–0)	Thornton (1–1)		2:41	24,720	30–27	box
58	June 3	Royals	9–5	Floyd (6–3)	Greinke (5–3)		2:33	21,727	31–27	box
59	June 4	Royals	6 – 4 (15)	Dotel (3–2)	Gobble (0–1)		4:23	23,727	32–27	box
60	June 5	Royals	6–2	Contreras (6–3)	Meche (3–8)		2:44	25,104	33–27	box
61	June 6	Twins	10–6	Vázquez (6–4)	Blackburn (4–4)		2:53	26,459	34–27	box
62	June 7	Twins	11–2	Buehrle (3–6)	Hernández (6–3)		2:16	32,930	35–27	box
63	June 8	Twins	12–2	Floyd (7–3)	Slowey (2–6)		2:25	30,565	36–27	box
64	June 9	Twins	7–5	Thornton (2–1)	Guerrier (3–2)	Jenks (15)	2:58	21,126	37–27	box
65	June 10	@ Tigers	4–6	Robertson (4–6)	Contreras (6–4)	Jones (11)	2:34	38,295	37–28	box
66	June 11	@ Tigers	1–5	Verlander (3–9)	Vázquez (6–5)		2:13	38,693	37–29	box
67	June 12	@ Tigers	1–2	Jones (2–0)	Dotel (3–3)		2:04	40,297	37–30	box
68	June 13	Rockies	5–4	Thornton (3–1)	Herges (2–3)	Jenks (16)	2:28	30,143	38–30	box
69	June 14	Rockies	0–2	Grilli (2–2)	Dotel (3–4)	Fuentes (10)	2:56	35,663	38–31	box
70	June 15	Rockies	3–5	Cook (10–3)	Contreras (6–5)	Fuentes (11)	2:44	32,004	38–32	box
71	June 17	Pirates	16–5	Vázquez (7–5)	Snell (3–7)		3:15	28,012	39–32	box
72	June 18	Pirates	8–2	Buehrle (4–6)	Gorzelanny (5–6)		2:17	28,570	40–32	box
73	June 19	Pirates	13–8	Floyd (8–3)	Dumatrait (3–4)		2:55	26,685	41–32	box
74	June 20	@ Cubs	3–4	Wood (4–1)	Linebrink (2–2)		2:32	41,106	41–33	box
75	June 21	@ Cubs	7–11	Marquis (6–3)	Contreras (6–6)	Wood (19)	2:52	41,021	41–34	box
76	June 22	@ Cubs	1–7	Dempster (9–2)	Vázquez (7–6)		2:52	41,034	41–35	box
77	June 24	@ Dodgers	6–1	Buehrle (5–6)	Lowe (5–7)		2:05	43,900	42–35	box
78	June 25	@ Dodgers	0–5	Stults (2–0)	Floyd (8–4)		2:22	40,162	42–36	box
79	June 26	@ Dodgers	2–0	Danks (5–4)	Kershaw (0–2)	Jenks (17)	2:58	37,956	43–36	box
80	June 27	Cubs	10–3	Contreras (7–6)	Dempster (9–3)		2:49	39,132	44–36	box
81	June 28	Cubs	6–5	Thornton (4–1)	Mármol (1–3)	Jenks (18)	3:03	39,143	45–36	box
82	June 29	Cubs	5–1	Buehrle (6–6)	Marshall (0–2)		2:34	39,573	46–36	box
83	June 30	Indians	9–7	Floyd (9–4)	Sowers (0–4)	Thornton (1)	2:57	38,466	47–36	box

July (13–12) – Home (7–5) – Road (6–7)

#	Date	Opponent	Score	Win	Loss	Save	Time	Att.	Record	Box
84	July 1	Indians	3 – 2 (10)	Russell (1–0)	Borowski (1–3)		2:44	25,502	48–36	box
85	July 2	Indians	6 – 5 (10)	Russell (2–0)	Kobayashi (4–4)		3:11	23,522	49–36	box
86	July 3	Athletics	2–3	Duchscherer (9–5)	Vázquez (7–7)	Street (16)	2:21	26,730	49–37	box
87	July 4	Athletics	1–7	Blanton (5–11)	Buehrle (6–7)		2:53	29,600	49–38	box
88	July 5	Athletics	6–1	Floyd (10–4)	Smith (5–7)		2:44	35,586	50–38	box
89	July 6	Athletics	4–3	Danks (6–4)	Harden (5–1)	Linebrink (1)	2:47	31,955	51–38	box
90	July 8	@ Royals	8 – 7 (13)	Masset (1–0)	Tejeda (0–1)		4:20	13,614	52–38	box
91	July 9	@ Royals	7–6	Russell (3–0)	Tejeda (0–2)	Dotel (1)	2:46	16,502	53–38	box
92	July 10	@ Royals	1–4	Mahay (5–0)	Buehrle (6–8)	Soria (24)	2:26	14,547	53–39	box
93	July 11	@ Rangers	2–7	Mendoza (2–3)	Floyd (10–5)	Guardado (2)	2:50	28,003	53–40	box
94	July 12	@ Rangers	9–7	Danks (7–4)	Millwood (6–5)		3:29	39,209	54–40	box
95	July 13	@ Rangers	11–12	Wright (6–4)	Logan (2–2)		4:01	28,459	54–41	box
All-Star Break: AL defeats NL 4–3 (15) at Yankee Stadium
96	July 18	Royals	9–5	Buehrle (7–8)	Greinke (7–6)		2:59	36,291	55–41	box
97	July 19	Royals	1–9	Meche (7–9)	Floyd (10–6)		2:51	36,566	55–42	box
98	July 20	Royals	7–8	R. Ramírez (1–1)	Thornton (4–2)	Soria (26)	3:09	32,269	55–43	box
99	July 21	Rangers	1–6	Feldman (4–3)	Vázquez (7–8)		2:37	39,547	55–44	box
100	July 22	Rangers	10–2	Buehrle (8–8)	Mendoza (2–4)		2:28	32,670	56–44	box
101	July 23	Rangers	10–8	Dotel (4–4)	Guardado (1–2)	Jenks (19)	3:05	35,353	57–44	box
102	July 25	@ Tigers	6–5	Carrasco (1–0)	Jones (4–1)	Jenks (20)	2:52	44,393	58–44	box
103	July 26	@ Tigers	7–6	Danks (8–4)	Verlander (8–10)	Jenks (21)	3:05	45,280	59–44	box
104	July 27	@ Tigers	4–6	Miner (5–3)	Vázquez (7–9)		2:46	41,790	59–45	box
105	July 28	@ Twins	0–7	Slowey (7–7)	Buehrle (8–9)		2:28	30,126	59–46	box
106	July 29	@ Twins	5–6	Perkins (8–3)	Richard (0–1)	Nathan (29)	2:50	35,999	59–47	box
107	July 30	@ Twins	8–3	Floyd (11–6)	Hernández (10–8)		2:52	42,705	60–47	box
108	July 31	@ Twins	6–10	Crain (4–2)	Thornton (4–3)		3:23	31,493	60–48	box

August (17–11) – Home (11–5) – Road (6–6)

#	Date	Opponent	Score	Win	Loss	Save	Time	Att.	Record	Box
109	August 1	@ Royals	4–2	Vázquez (8–9)	Hochevar (6–9)	Jenks (22)	2:54	21,291	61–48	box
110	August 2	@ Royals	7–9	Davies (5–2)	Buehrle (8–10)	Soria (31)	3:01	21,866	61–49	box
111	August 3	@ Royals	3–14	Greinke (9–7)	Richard (0–2)		2:59	15,268	61–50	box
112	August 5	Tigers	10 – 8 (14)	Russell (4–0)	Zumaya (0–1)		4:58	35,371	62–50	box
113	August 6	Tigers	5–1	Danks (9–4)	Verlander (8–12)		2:31	34,124	63–50	box
114	August 7	Tigers	3–8	Miner (6–4)	Vázquez (8–10)	Rodney (2)	3:08	36,383	63–51	box
115	August 8	Red Sox	5–3	Buehrle (9–10)	Lester (10–4)	Jenks (23)	2:27	38,621	64–51	box
116	August 9	Red Sox	2–6	Matsuzaka (13–2)	Logan (2–3)		2:54	39,243	64–52	box
117	August 10	Red Sox	6–5	Floyd (12–6)	Buchholz (2–8)	Jenks (24)	3:06	39,008	65–52	box
118	August 11	Red Sox	1–5	Beckett (11–8)	Danks (9–5)		2:48	32,634	65–53	box
119	August 12	Royals	9–0	Vázquez (9–10)	Bannister (7–11)		2:13	31,099	66–53	box
120	August 13	Royals	4–0	Buehrle (10–10)	Hochevar (6–11)		2:17	37,838	67–53	box
121	August 14	Royals	9–2	Broadway (1–0)	Davies (5–4)		3:00	32,788	68–53	box
122	August 15	@ Athletics	4–6	Street (3–5)	H. Ramírez (1–2)		2:44	19,405	68–54	box
123	August 16	@ Athletics	2–1	Danks (10–5)	Smith (5–12)	Jenks (25)	3:01	22,206	69–54	box
124	August 17	@ Athletics	13–1	Vázquez (10–10)	Gonzalez (1–2)		2:19	28,843	70–54	box
125	August 18	Mariners	13–5	Buehrle (11–10)	Washburn (5–13)		2:43	39,002	71–54	box
126	August 19	Mariners	5–0	Richard (1–2)	Hernández (7–8)		2:36	26,414	72–54	box
127	August 20	Mariners	15–3	Floyd (13–6)	Dickey (3–8)		2:30	27,000	73–54	box
128	August 22	Rays	4–9	Jackson (10–8)	Danks (10–6)		3:20	38,747	73–55	box
129	August 23	Rays	3–5	Balfour (4–2)	Vázquez (10–11)	Wheeler (8)	3:04	36,482	73–56	box
130	August 24	Rays	6 – 5 (10)	Jenks (3–0)	Hammel (4–4)		3:11	38,562	74–56	box
131	August 25	@ Orioles	4–3	Richard (2–2)	Waters (2–1)	Jenks (26)	2:33	20,707	75–56	box
132	August 26	@ Orioles	8–3	Floyd (14–6)	Burres (7–8)		2:44	15,398	76–56	box
133	August 27	@ Orioles	3–11	Liz (5–3)	Danks (10–7)		2:49	15,736	76–57	box
134	August 29	@ Red Sox	0–8	Matsuzaka (16–2)	Vázquez (10–12)		2:48	37,755	76–58	box
135	August 30	@ Red Sox	2–8	Bowden (1–0)	Buehrle (11–11)		2:40	37,751	76–59	box
136	August 31	@ Red Sox	4–2	Floyd (15–6)	Wakefield (8–9)	Jenks (27)	2:47	37,391	77–59	box

September (12–15) – Home (8–6) – Road (4–9)

#	Date	Opponent	Score	Win	Loss	Save	Time	Att.	Record	Box
137	September 1	@ Indians	0–5	Lee (20–2)	Richard (2–3)		2:26	23,317	77–60	box
138	September 2	@ Indians	3–9	Carmona (8–5)	Danks (10–8)		3:12	20,980	77–61	box
139	September 3	@ Indians	4–2	Vázquez (11–12)	Sowers (2–8)	Jenks (28)	3:12	20,328	78–61	box
140	September 5	Angels	10–2	Buehrle (12–11)	Moseley (1–4)		2:48	32,502	79–61	box
141	September 6	Angels	7 – 6 (15)	Wassermann (1–1)	Speier (1–8)		3:54	31,046	80–61	box
142	September 7	Angels	2–3	Saunders (15–7)	H. Ramírez (1–4)	Rodríguez (55)	2:44	26,029	80–62	box
–	September 8	Blue Jays	Postponed (rain), rescheduled for September 9							
143	September 9	Blue Jays	1–3	Burnett (17–10)	Vázquez (11–13)	Ryan (28)	3:08	24,621	80–63	box
144	September 9	Blue Jays	2–8	Litsch (11–8)	Richard (2–4)		2:37	28,505	80–64	box
145	September 10	Blue Jays	6–5	Buehrle (13–11)	Halladay (18–10)		2:39	26,198	81–64	box
146	September 11	Blue Jays	4–6	Marcum (9–6)	Floyd (15–7)	Ryan (29)	2:57	27,170	81–65	box
–	September 12	Tigers	Postponed (rain) Rescheduled for September 13							
–	September 13	Tigers	Postponed (rain), rescheduled for September 14							
–	September 13	Tigers	Postponed (rain), rescheduled for September 29							
147	September 14	Tigers	4–2	Vázquez (12–13)	Verlander (10–16)		2:17	N/A	82–65	box
148	September 14	Tigers	11–7	Thornton (5–3)	Seay (1–2)		3:16	28,238	83–65	box
149	September 15	@ Yankees	2–4	Coke (1–0)	Wassermann (1–2)	Rivera (36)	2:39	53,236	83–66	box
150	September 16	@ Yankees	6–2	Floyd (16–7)	Pettitte (13–14)		3:02	52,558	84–66	box
151	September 17	@ Yankees	1–5	Bruney (3–0)	Richard (2–5)		2:40	52,671	84–67	box
152	September 18	@ Yankees	2–9	Mussina (18–9)	Vázquez (12–14)		3:08	53,152	84–68	box
153	September 19	@ Royals	9–4	Buehrle (14–11)	Bannister (8–16)		2:40	26,049	85–68	box
154	September 20	@ Royals	2–5	Davies (8–7)	Floyd (16–8)	Soria (41)	2:32	23,754	85–69	box
155	September 21	@ Royals	3–0	Danks (11–8)	Duckworth (3–2)	Jenks (29)	2:28	16,920	86–69	box
156	September 23	@ Twins	3–9	Baker (10–4)	Vázquez (12–15)		2:43	35,225	86–70	box
157	September 24	@ Twins	2–3	Blackburn (11–10)	Buehrle (14–12)	Nathan (39)	2:42	42,126	86–71	box
158	September 25	@ Twins	6 – 7 (10)	Nathan (1–2)	Jenks (3–1)		3:27	43,601	86–72	box
159	September 26	Indians	8–11	S. Lewis (4–0)	Danks (11–9)	J. Lewis (13)	3:36	36,494	86–73	box
160	September 27	Indians	6–12	Jackson (2–3)	Vázquez (12–16)		3:05	36,031	86–74	box
161	September 28	Indians	5–1	Buehrle (15–12)	Bullington (0–2)		2:29	33,396	87–74	box
162	September 29	Tigers	8–2	Floyd (17–8)	Galarraga (13–7)		3:14	35,923	88–74	box
163*	September 30	Twins	1–0	Danks (12–9)	Blackburn (11–11)	Jenks (30)	2:20	40,354	89–74	box

*AL Central tiebreaker

2008 White Sox postseason game log
American League Division Series (1–3) (best of 5)

#	Date	Opponent	Score	Win	Loss	Save	Time	Att.	Record	Box
1	October 2	@ Rays	4–6	Shields (1–0)	Vázquez (0–1)	Wheeler (1)	3:10	35,041	0–1	box
2	October 3	@ Rays	2–6	Kazmir (1–0)	Buehrle (0–1)		3:10	35,257	0–2	box
3	October 5	Rays	5–3	Danks (1–0)	Garza (0–1)	Jenks (1)	3:07	40,142	1–2	box
4	October 6	Rays	2–6	Sonnanstine (1–0)	Floyd (0–1)		3:13	40,454	1–3	box

=== Roster ===
2008 Chicago White Sox
Roster
Pitchers: 41 Lance Broadway; 56 Mark Buehrle; 53 D. J. Carrasco; 52 José Contreras; 50 John Danks; 26 Octavio Dotel; 34 Gavin Floyd; 45 Bobby Jenks; 71 Scott Linebrink; 48 Esteban Loaiza; 57 Boone Logan; 47 Mike MacDougal; 46 Nick Masset; 49 Horacio Ramírez; 54 Clayton Richard; 61 Adam Russell; 37 Matt Thornton; 33 Javier Vázquez; 43 Ehren Wassermann	Catchers: 44 Toby Hall; 27 Paul Phillips; 12 A. J. Pierzynski; Infielders: 38 Jason Bourgeois; 18 Orlando Cabrera; 24 Joe Crede; 22 Josh Fields; 39 Chris Getz; 14 Paul Konerko; 38 Pablo Ozuna; 10 Alexei Ramírez; 30 Nick Swisher; 5 Juan Uribe	Outfielders: 32 Brian Anderson; 23 Jermaine Dye; 17 Ken Griffey Jr.; 7 Jerry Owens; 20 Carlos Quentin; 31 DeWayne Wise; Other batters: 25 Jim Thome	Manager: 13 Ozzie Guillén; Coaches: 3 Harold Baines (first base); 21 Don Cooper (pitching); 28 Joey Cora (bench); 8 Jeff Cox (third base); 36 Juan Nieves (bullpen); 29 Greg Walker (hitting)

== Player stats ==
=== Batting ===
Note: G = Games played; AB = At bats; R = Runs scored; H = Hits; 2B = Doubles; 3B = Triples; HR = Home runs; RBI = Runs batted in; AVG = Batting average; SB = Stolen bases

Player	G	AB	R	H	2B	3B	HR	RBI	AVG	SB
Brian Anderson	109	181	24	42	13	0	8	26	.232	5
Mark Buehrle	2	6	0	1	0	0	0	0	.167	0
Orlando Cabrera	161	661	93	186	33	1	8	57	.281	19
José Contreras	1	1	0	0	0	0	0	0	.000	0
Joe Crede	97	335	41	83	18	1	17	55	.248	0
John Danks	3	6	0	1	0	0	0	0	.167	0
Octavio Dotel	5	0	0	0	0	0	0	0	.000	0
Jermaine Dye	154	590	96	172	41	2	34	96	.292	3
Josh Fields	14	32	3	5	1	0	0	2	.156	0
Gavin Floyd	2	3	0	0	0	0	0	0	.000	0
Ken Griffey Jr.	41	131	16	34	10	0	3	18	.260	0
Toby Hall	41	127	7	33	3	0	2	7	.260	0
Bobby Jenks	4	0	0	0	0	0	0	0	.000	0
Paul Konerko	122	438	59	105	19	1	22	62	.240	2
Scott Linebrink	5	0	0	0	0	0	0	0	.000	0
Boone Logan	3	0	0	0	0	0	0	0	.000	0
Nick Masset	3	1	0	0	0	0	0	0	.000	0
Pablo Ozuna	32	64	5	18	3	0	0	6	.281	0
A. J. Pierzynski	134	534	66	150	31	1	13	60	.281	1
Carlos Quentin	130	480	96	138	26	1	36	100	.288	7
Alexei Ramírez	136	480	65	139	22	2	21	77	.290	13
Adam Russell	1	0	0	0	0	0	0	0	.000	0
Nick Swisher	153	497	86	109	21	1	24	69	.219	3
Jim Thome	149	503	93	123	28	0	34	90	.245	1
Matt Thornton	4	0	0	0	0	0	0	0	.000	0
Juan Uribe	110	324	38	80	22	1	7	40	.247	1
Javier Vázquez	1	2	0	0	0	0	0	0	.000	0
Ehren Wassermann	2	0	0	0	0	0	0	0	.000	0
DeWayne Wise	57	129	20	32	4	2	6	18	.248	9
Team totals	163	5553	811	1458	296	13	235	785	.263	67

=== Pitching ===
Note: W = Wins; L = Losses; ERA = Earned run average; G = Games pitched; GS = Games started; SV = Saves; IP = Innings pitched; R = Runs allowed; ER = Earned runs allowed; BB = Walks allowed; K = Strikeouts

Player	W	L	ERA	G	GS	SV	IP	R	ER	BB	K
Mark Buehrle	15	12	3.79	34	34	0	218.2	106	92	52	140
D. J. Carrasco	1	0	3.96	31	0	0	38.2	17	17	14	30
José Contreras	7	6	4.54	20	20	0	121	64	61	35	70
John Danks	12	9	3.32	33	33	0	195	74	72	57	159
Octavio Dotel	4	4	3.76	72	0	1	67	34	28	29	92
Gavin Floyd	17	8	3.84	33	33	0	206.1	107	88	70	145
Bobby Jenks	3	1	2.63	57	0	30	61.2	18	18	17	38
Scott Linebrink	2	2	3.69	50	0	1	46.1	20	19	9	40
Esteban Loaiza	0	0	3.00	3	0	0	3.0	2	1	0	1
Boone Logan	2	3	5.95	55	0	0	42.1	31	28	14	42
Mike MacDougal	0	0	2.12	16	0	0	17	4	4	14	14
Nick Masset	1	0	4.63	32	1	1	44.2	26	23	21	32
Clayton Richard	2	5	6.04	8	13	0	47.2	37	32	13	29
Adam Russell	4	0	5.19	16	0	0	26	15	15	10	22
Matt Thornton	5	3	2.67	74	0	1	67.1	20	20	19	77
Javier Vázquez	12	16	4.67	33	33	0	208.1	113	108	61	200
Ehren Wassermann	1	2	7.78	24	0	0	19.2	19	17	14	9
Team totals	89	74	4.11	163	163	34	1457.2	665	729	460	1147

== Farm system ==
Level	Team	League	Manager
AAA	Charlotte Knights	International League	Marc Bombard
AA	Birmingham Barons	Southern League	Carlos Subero
A	Winston-Salem Warthogs	Carolina League	Tim Blackwell
A	Kannapolis Intimidators	South Atlantic League	Chris Jones and Nick Capra
Rookie	Bristol White Sox	Appalachian League	Bobby Thigpen
Rookie	Great Falls Voyagers	Pioneer League	Chris Cron

LEAGUE CHAMPIONS: Great Falls

== Trivia ==
- The 2008 White Sox became the first team to ever win its last three regular season games against three different opponents.
