= Ehren Wassermann =

American baseball player (born 1980)

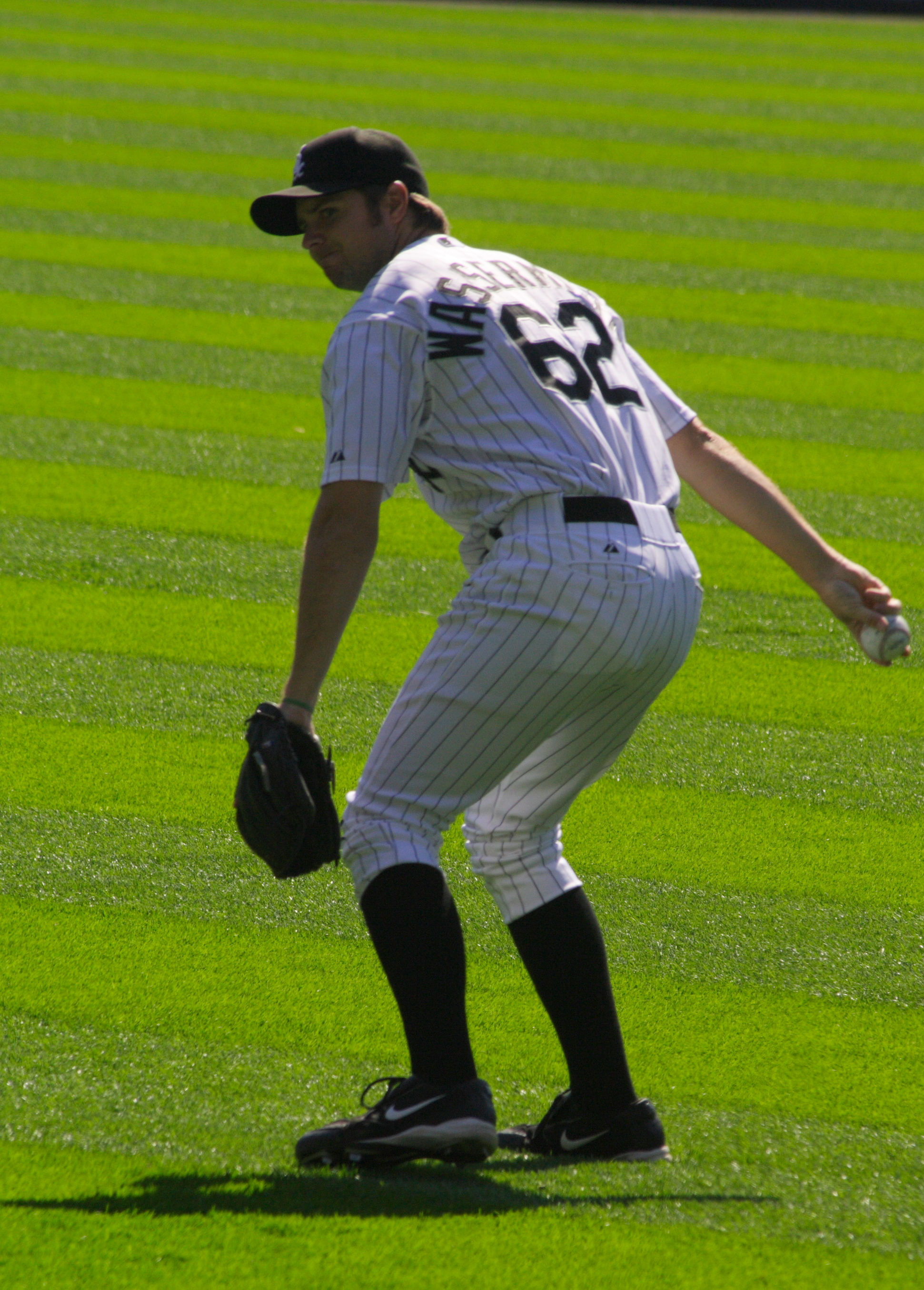
- Relief pitcher
- Born: December 6, 1980 (age 45); Sylacauga, Alabama, U.S.
- Batted: Switch Threw: Right

MLB debut
- July 20, 2007, for the Chicago White Sox

Last MLB appearance
- September 26, 2008, for the Chicago White Sox

MLB statistics
- Win–loss record: 2–3
- Earned run average: 5.06
- Strikeouts: 23
- Stats at Baseball Reference

Teams
- Chicago White Sox (2007–2008)
Medals
Men's baseball
Representing United States
Baseball World Cup
Gold medal – first place	2009 Nettuno	National team

Ehren Josef Wassermann (born December 6, 1980) is an American former professional baseball player and coach. He currently serves as the head coach for John Carroll Catholic High School. A right-handed sidearm pitcher, Wassermann made his Major League Baseball debut with the Chicago White Sox on July 20, 2007, against the Boston Red Sox at Fenway Park, retiring both batters faced.

== Amateur career ==
Wassermann attended Jefferson Davis Community College before transferring to Samford University, majoring in sports medicine, in Homewood, Alabama. In his junior year, he posted a 4.04 earned run average (ERA) as a starter and led the staff in appearances (25), innings pitched (91.1), and saves (3) while also finishing second in ERA and strikeouts (65).

== Career ==
=== Chicago White Sox ===
Wassermann was signed as an undrafted free agent in 2003 after attending a tryout camp for the Chicago White Sox; he sold knives in between attending tryouts. That year, he started his minor league career with the Bristol White Sox, while posting an 0–1 record and a 14.73 ERA in four appearances. Wassermann also made six appearances for the Kannapolis Intimidators, going 1–1 with a 1.00 ERA over nine innings pitched. In 2004, he posted a record of 2–3, recorded 30 saves, and pitched to a 2.56 ERA over 51 games for Kannapolis. Wassermann was later promoted to the Single-A Winston-Salem Warthogs, where he finished 1–0 with a 2.70 ERA in 10 games. In 2005, Wassermann went 4–2 with 20 saves and a 1.37 ERA over 42 games for Winston-Salem. He also played in 14 games for the Double-A Birmingham Barons, going 2–0 with a 2.14 ERA. Wassermann spent the entire 2006 season in Birmingham, compiling a 4–8 record with 22 saves and a 2.56 ERA over 61 appearances. In 2007, he was promoted to the Triple-A Charlotte Knights. He allowed only four home runs in four seasons during his minor league career.

Wassermann was called up to the White Sox on July 17, 2007, replacing Nick Masset on the team's active roster. Wassermann made his major league debut on July 20, facing the Boston Red Sox at Fenway Park, and retired both batters he faced. He pitched 42 2/3 innings in 55 relief appearances over two seasons while posting a 2–3 record and a 5.06 ERA in his major league stint. He never allowed a home run in his major league career of 57 games. After spending time with the Charlotte Knights in between major league stints, Wassermann would spend the entire 2009 season in Charlotte. In 43 appearances, he was 7–3 with one save and a 3.68 ERA over 63.2 innings pitched. On November 9, 2009, he elected free agency.

=== Philadelphia Phillies ===
On January 6, 2010, Wassermann signed a minor league deal with the Philadelphia Phillies organization. He would spend the entire 2010 season with the Triple-A Lehigh Valley IronPigs, but appeared in only 18 games due to an injury, going 0–3 with a 6.23 ERA. He elected free agency on November 6, 2010.

=== Long Island Ducks ===
On March 24, 2011, Wassermann signed with the Long Island Ducks of the Independent Atlantic League. He played in 51 games for Long Island, finishing the season 4–1 with 11 saves and a 2.57 ERA over 63 innings pitched. He became a free agent after the season.

== Coaching career ==
In April 2012, Wassermann became the pitching coach for the Windy City ThunderBolts of the independent Frontier League. In January 2013, Wassermann became the pitching coach for the GCL Twins in the Minnesota Twins organization. In 2018, he became the pitching coach at Hoover High School in Alabama. On June 24, 2022, Wassermann was named the head coach for John Carroll Catholic High School in Birmingham, Alabama.

== Notes and references ==
- "SportsNite". SportsNite. August 13, 2007.
