= Brandon McCarthy =

American baseball player (born 1983)

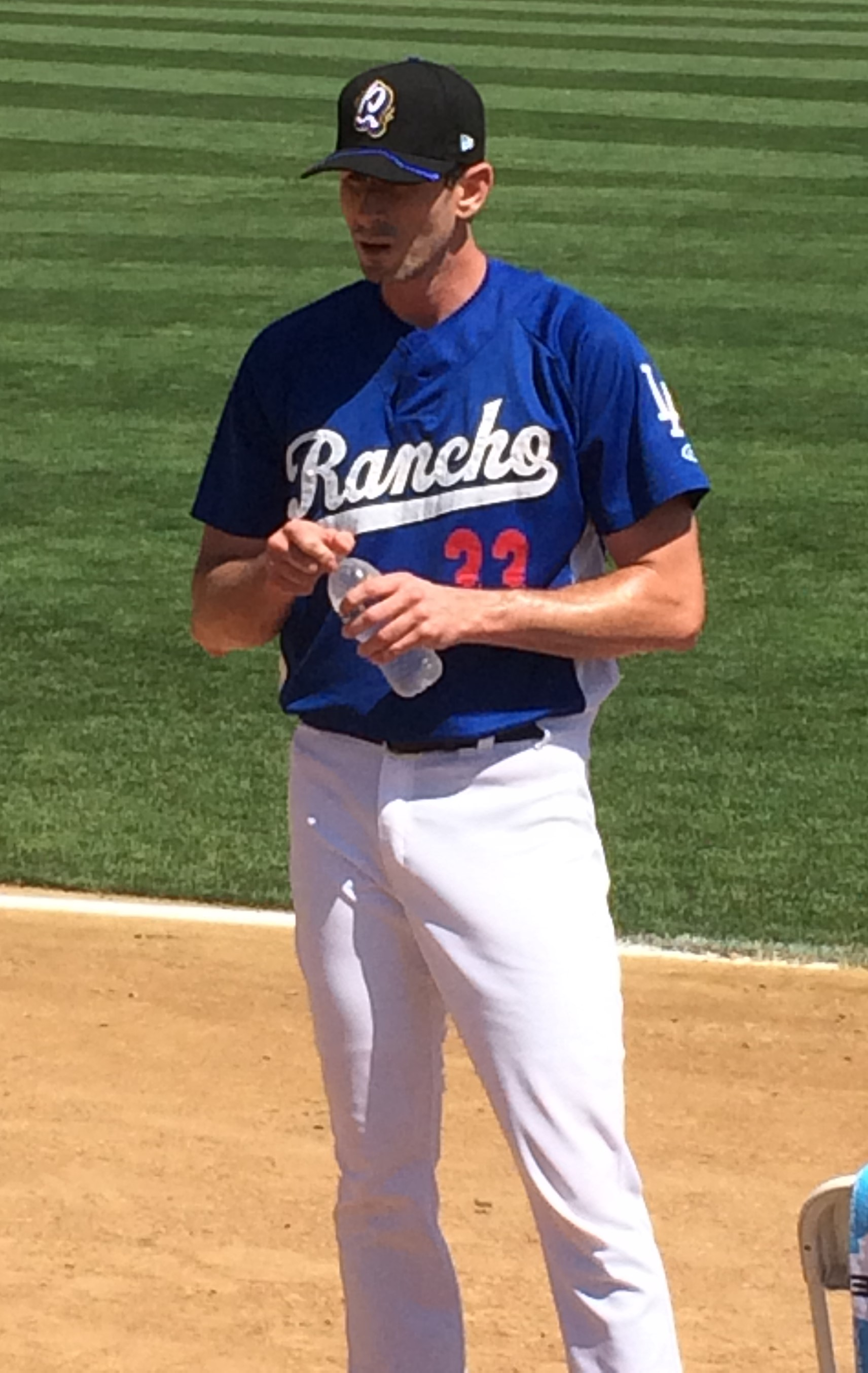
- McCarthy with the Rancho Cucamonga Quakes in 2016
- Pitcher
- Born: July 7, 1983 (age 43); Glendale, California, U.S.
- Batted: Right Threw: Right

MLB debut
- May 22, 2005, for the Chicago White Sox

Last MLB appearance
- June 24, 2018, for the Atlanta Braves

MLB statistics
- Win–loss record: 69–75
- Earned run average: 4.20
- Strikeouts: 908
- Stats at Baseball Reference

Teams
- Chicago White Sox (2005–2006); Texas Rangers (2007–2009); Oakland Athletics (2011–2012); Arizona Diamondbacks (2013–2014); New York Yankees (2014); Los Angeles Dodgers (2015–2017); Atlanta Braves (2018)

Brandon Patrick McCarthy (born July 7, 1983) is an American former professional baseball pitcher and front office executive. He is the special assistant to the general manager for the Texas Rangers of Major League Baseball (MLB). He played in MLB for the Chicago White Sox, Rangers, Oakland Athletics, Arizona Diamondbacks, New York Yankees, Los Angeles Dodgers, and Atlanta Braves. He is a minority owner of Phoenix Rising FC, of the USL Championship.

== Early life ==
McCarthy was born and raised in Glendale, California. McCarthy graduated from Cheyenne Mountain High School in Colorado Springs, Colorado, in 2001. He attended Lamar Community College for the 2002 season, where he was 12–0 as a starter and helped them to a third-place finish in the 2002 Junior College World Series.

== Minor leagues ==
The Chicago White Sox selected McCarthy in the 17th round of the 2002 Major League Baseball draft. He made his professional baseball debut with the White Sox affiliate in the rookie Arizona League. He made 14 starts and was 4–4 with a 2.76 ERA and he led the league in strikeouts with 79. He was promoted to the Great Falls White Sox of the Pioneer League for the 2003 season. McCarthy posted impressive stats and showed excellent control, pitching 101 innings, striking out 125 batters, and walking only 15 batters. He finished 9–4 with a 3.65 ERA while making 15 starts. He led the league in innings pitched and strikeouts and recorded 12 strikeouts in a complete game against the Provo Angels on June 29.

In 2004, he began the season with the Class-A Kannapolis Intimidators, starting 15 games and accumulating an 8–5 record and 3.64 ERA. His 113 strikeouts led the team and he was selected to the mid-season South Atlantic League All-Star game. On July 1, he was promoted to the Winston-Salem Warthogs of the Carolina League. In a game against the Myrtle Beach Pelicans on July 31, he struck out 16 batters. In eight starts he was 6–0 with a 2.08 ERA and walked just three batters in 52 innings. McCarthy was promoted to the Double-A Birmingham Barons of the Southern League on August 12. In four starts he was 3–1 with a 3.46 ERA however he allowed four runs in six innings to take the loss in game one of the Southern League playoffs. Overall, he led all minor league pitchers in strikeouts, with 202. He was named a starting pitcher on Baseball America's 2004 minor league all-star team and was selected by the White Sox as their minor league player of the year. He received a non roster invitation to major league spring training in 2005 and Baseball America ranked him as the Sox #3 prospect and with the best control in the system entering the season. He began the season in Triple-A with the Charlotte Knights of the International League where he made 19 starts and was 7–7 with a 4.00 ERA.

== Major leagues ==
=== Chicago White Sox ===
McCarthy made his major league debut on May 22, 2005, as a spot starter for the White Sox, allowing two runs in 5 1/3 innings, in a game against the Chicago Cubs. He picked up his first win when he pitched 7 2/3 scoreless innings against the Texas Rangers in the second game of a double-header on August 30. He pitched in 12 games (10 starts) with the club, going 3–2, but did not pitch in the postseason as the White Sox went on to win the World Series. He earned a permanent spot on the team as a reliever in 2006, appearing in 53 games while making a few spot starts. He finished the season 4–7 with a 4.68 ERA in 84 2/3 innings.

=== Texas Rangers ===
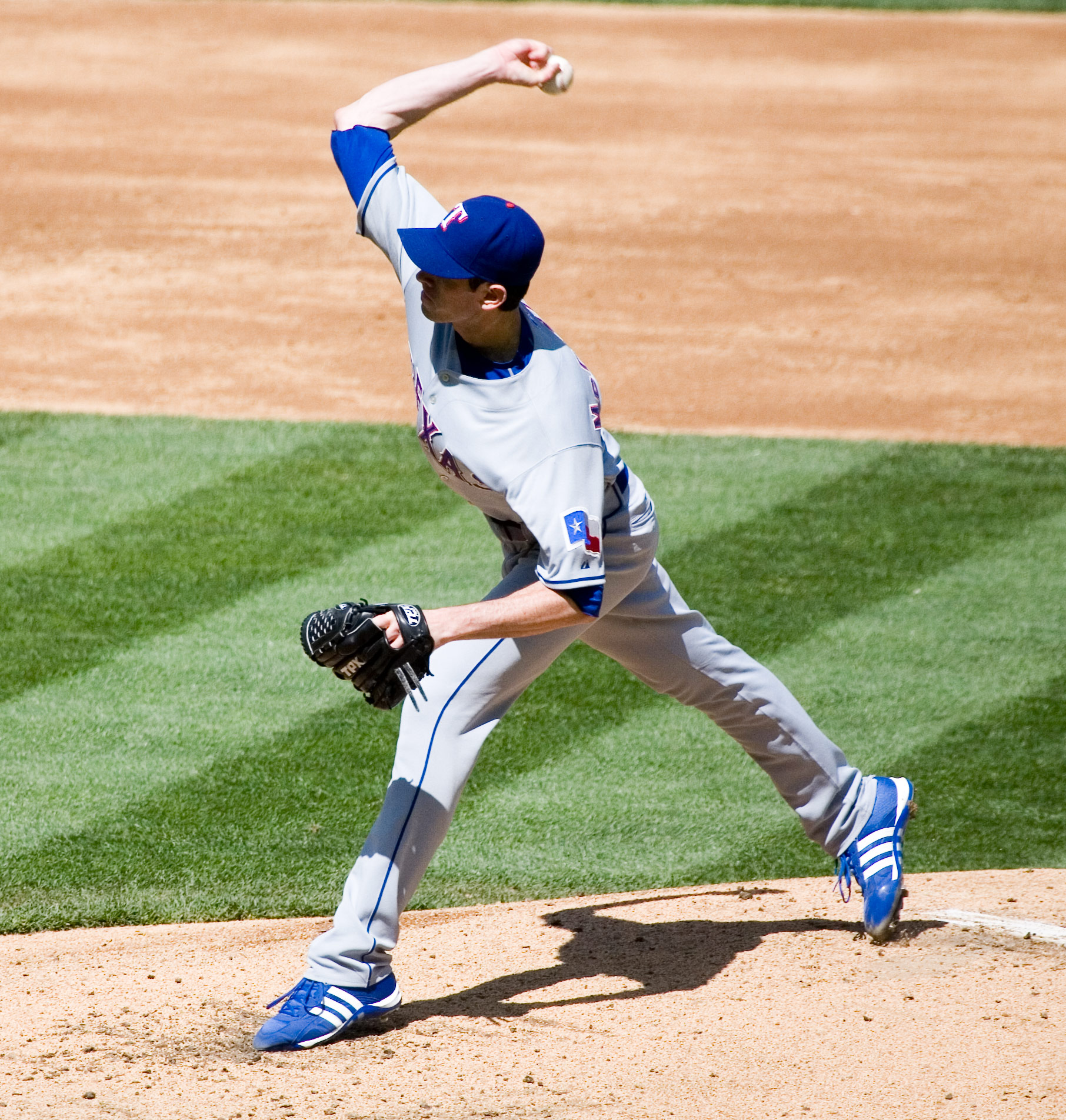
McCarthy pitching for the Texas Rangers in 2007

On December 23, 2006, McCarthy and minor leaguer David Paisano were traded to the Texas Rangers for John Danks, Nick Masset and Jake Rasner. He endured an injury-plagued season in his first year for the Rangers (and his first full year as a starter) in 2007, most notably dealing with a stress fracture in his right shoulder blade that kept him sidelined for nearly 2 months. He finished the season with a 5–10 record with a 4.87 ERA in 22 starts.

In 2008, as he developed inflammation in his right elbow during spring training. He began rehabbing between July and August and finished the season making 5 starts for the Rangers. After opening the 2009 season in the rotation, McCarthy went on to pitch 17 starts in a row before undergoing surgery in July. He missed the remainder of the season. He missed the whole 2010 season recovering from the surgery on his right shoulder, though he did make 11 rehab starts in the minor leagues, going 4–2.

=== Oakland Athletics ===
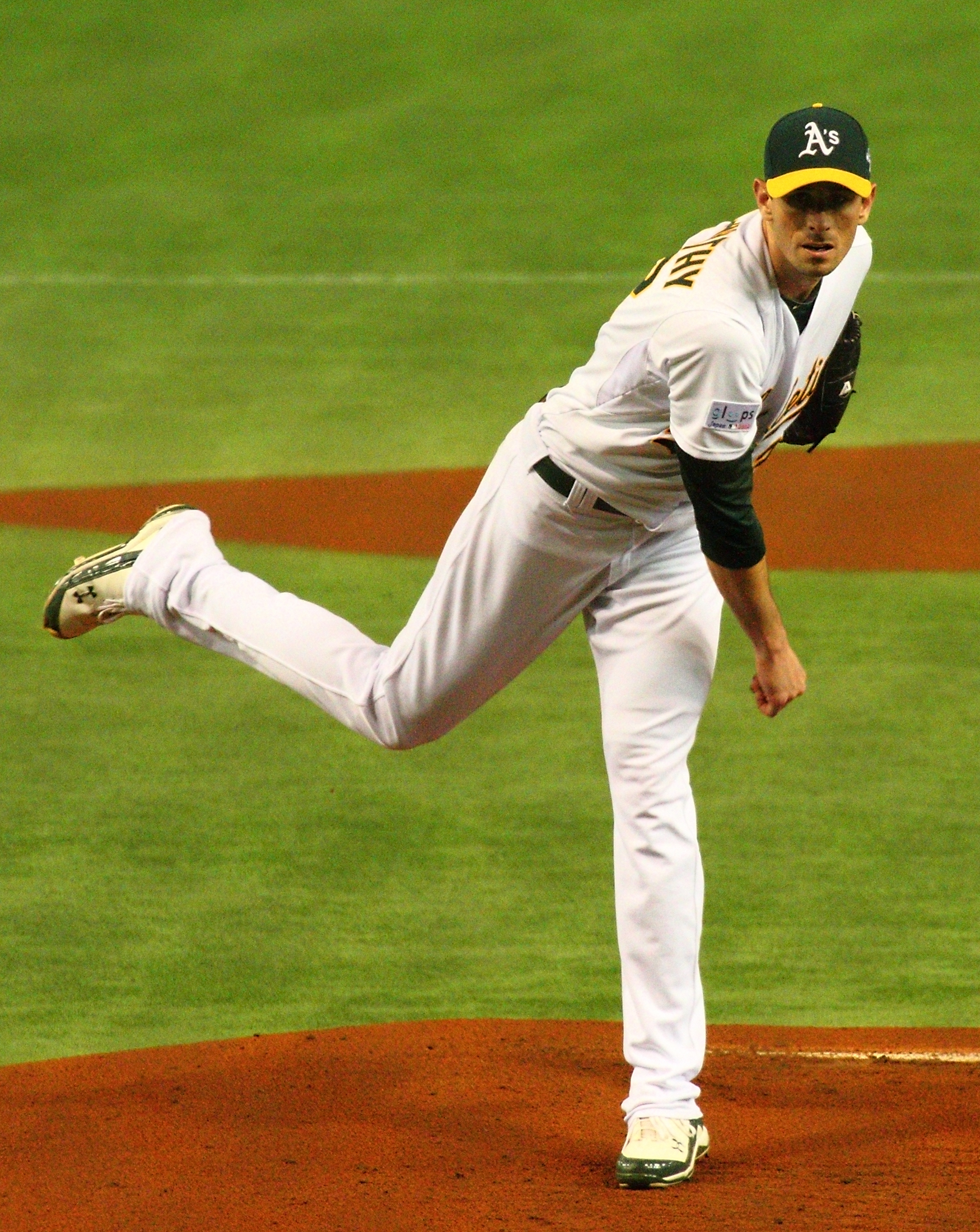
McCarthy pitching for the Oakland Athletics in 2012

After being outrighted by the Rangers, McCarthy signed as a free agent with the Oakland Athletics on December 14, 2010, for one year and $1 million. As part of the starting pitcher rotation for the Athletics in 2011, McCarthy strengthened his mechanics and had his most productive major league season, starting 25 games and pitching five complete games. He adapted his pitch repertoire to emphasize two-seam fastballs and cutters, which helped increase his ground-ball percentage and lower his home-run rate while developing control and limiting walks allowed. McCarthy finished the year with the lowest FIP among American League starters. He signed a one-year contract worth $4.275 million with the Athletics for the 2012 season, avoiding salary arbitration.

McCarthy was the Athletics opening day starter for the 2012 season. On September 5, he took a line drive to the head off the bat of Erick Aybar of the Los Angeles Angels of Anaheim. McCarthy subsequently underwent surgery for 2 hours to relieve cranial pressure after CT scans revealed he had suffered an epidural hemorrhage, a brain contusion, and a skull fracture. While he did not pitch again that season, he recovered well enough to join his teammates in the dugout as a spectator during their postseason run. He was 8–6 in 18 starts for the Athletics in 2012.

=== Arizona Diamondbacks ===
On December 7, 2012, the Arizona Diamondbacks signed McCarthy to a 2-year $15.5 million contract. In June, while on the disabled list for continued shoulder problems, McCarthy experienced a seizure related to his head injury the previous year. He was placed on medication and expected to return to pitch as his shoulder allowed. In his first season in the National League and with the Diamondbacks, McCarthy finished 5–11 with a 4.53 ERA and 2 complete games in 22 starts. He started 3–10 with a 5.01 ERA in 18 starts for the Diamondbacks in 2014.

=== New York Yankees ===
On July 6, 2014, the New York Yankees acquired McCarthy from the Diamondbacks in exchange for Vidal Nuño. The Yankees had McCarthy resume the use of his cut fastball, which the Diamondbacks had him stop using, while decreasing the use of his sinker. On September 17, 2014, he pitched an immaculate inning, striking out all three batters in the seventh inning against the Tampa Bay Rays, throwing only nine pitches, becoming the 77th pitcher to do so in the history of Major League Baseball. In 14 starts for the Yankees he was 7–5 with a 2.89 ERA.

=== Los Angeles Dodgers ===
On December 16, 2014, McCarthy and the Los Angeles Dodgers signed a four-year contract worth $48 million. However, on April 27, 2015, McCarthy was placed on the disabled list after he felt tightness in his right elbow in a start against the San Diego Padres and was diagnosed with a torn UCL. He underwent season-ending Tommy John surgery on April 30. In four starts before his injury, he was 3–0 with a 5.87 ERA.

After a lengthy recovery and a few rehab starts in the minors, McCarthy rejoined the Dodgers on July 3, 2016, making his season debut in a 4–1 win against the Colorado Rockies. In his first four starts he went 5 or more innings, won two games and pitched fairly effectively however on July 27 he allowed three runs in four innings and his next three starts after that he couldn't get past the fourth inning and walked five batters in each game, including five in 1 2/3 innings on August 13. On August 14, he was placed on the 15-day disabled list with stiffness in his right hip. He thought his career might be in jeopardy but he rejoined the team on September 25 and allowed only two runs in 5 1/3 innings against the Colorado Rockies. His last appearance of the season was a relief appearance against the San Francisco Giants on September 30. He allowed six runs on five hits and one walk without retiring a single batter. He appeared in a total of 10 games for the Dodgers in 2016 (with nine starts), and was 2–3 with a 4.95 ERA.

In 2017, McCarthy started the season in the rotation and won five of his first six decisions. However, his season was beset with issues, he was placed on the disabled list in May after suffering a dislocated left shoulder while weight-lifting, battled the yips in June which led to another lengthy stint on the disabled list. He pitched out of the bullpen at the end of the season. Overall, in 2017, he was 6–4 with a 3.98 ERA in 92 2/3 innings over 19 games (16 starts). After being left off the roster for the first two rounds of the playoffs, the Dodgers added him to the active roster for the 2017 World Series. His only appearance in the series was in the 11th inning of Game Two. He allowed a two-run home run to George Springer of the Houston Astros, and was charged with the loss.

=== Atlanta Braves ===
On December 16, 2017, the Dodgers traded McCarthy, Charlie Culberson, Scott Kazmir, Adrián González, and cash considerations to the Atlanta Braves for Matt Kemp. Through the end of June with the 2018 Braves, McCarthy had a 6–3 record in 15 starts, with a 4.92 ERA. He did not pitch during July or in the first half of August, due to right knee tendinitis. On August 14, McCarthy announced his intent to retire at the conclusion of the 2018 MLB season. On September 10, he was shut down by the Braves, ending his playing career. McCarthy finished his major-league career with 69 wins and an ERA of 4.20, drawing attention due to the prominence of the numbers 69 and 420 in meme culture.

== Front office career ==
On December 11, 2018, McCarthy was named a special assistant to the general manager in the Texas Rangers front office.

== Personal life ==
McCarthy is a minority owner of Phoenix Rising FC of the USL Championship. McCarthy was instrumental in getting the name Phoenix Rising approved by the team's board because it sounded like a mixture of a European team name and an American mascot.

=== Junior Flemmings Incident ===
Despite prior praise over his support of the LGBT+ community, McCarthy was criticized in 2020 by Outsports writer, Alex Reimer, over his reaction to a homophobia controversy involving the Phoenix Rising FC, where the San Diego Loyal walked off the field in protest and forfeited a match after midfielder Junior Flemmings was accused of using a Jamaican homophobic slur against openly gay Loyal midfielder Collin Martin, which was not heard by the referee or any other player.

McCarthy was accused of questioning the veracity of accusations made against Flemmings, suggesting in a direct message with another Twitter user that the Loyal, who forfeited a match against the Los Angeles Galaxy II in the days prior over the alleged use of a racial slur against a Black Loyal player, wanted to forfeit the match to begin with to continue making a statement on social justice.

In later statements, McCarthy said he was "emotional" in his initial reaction to the incident.
