= 2008 American League Central tie-breaker game =

2008 Major League Baseball tie-breaker game

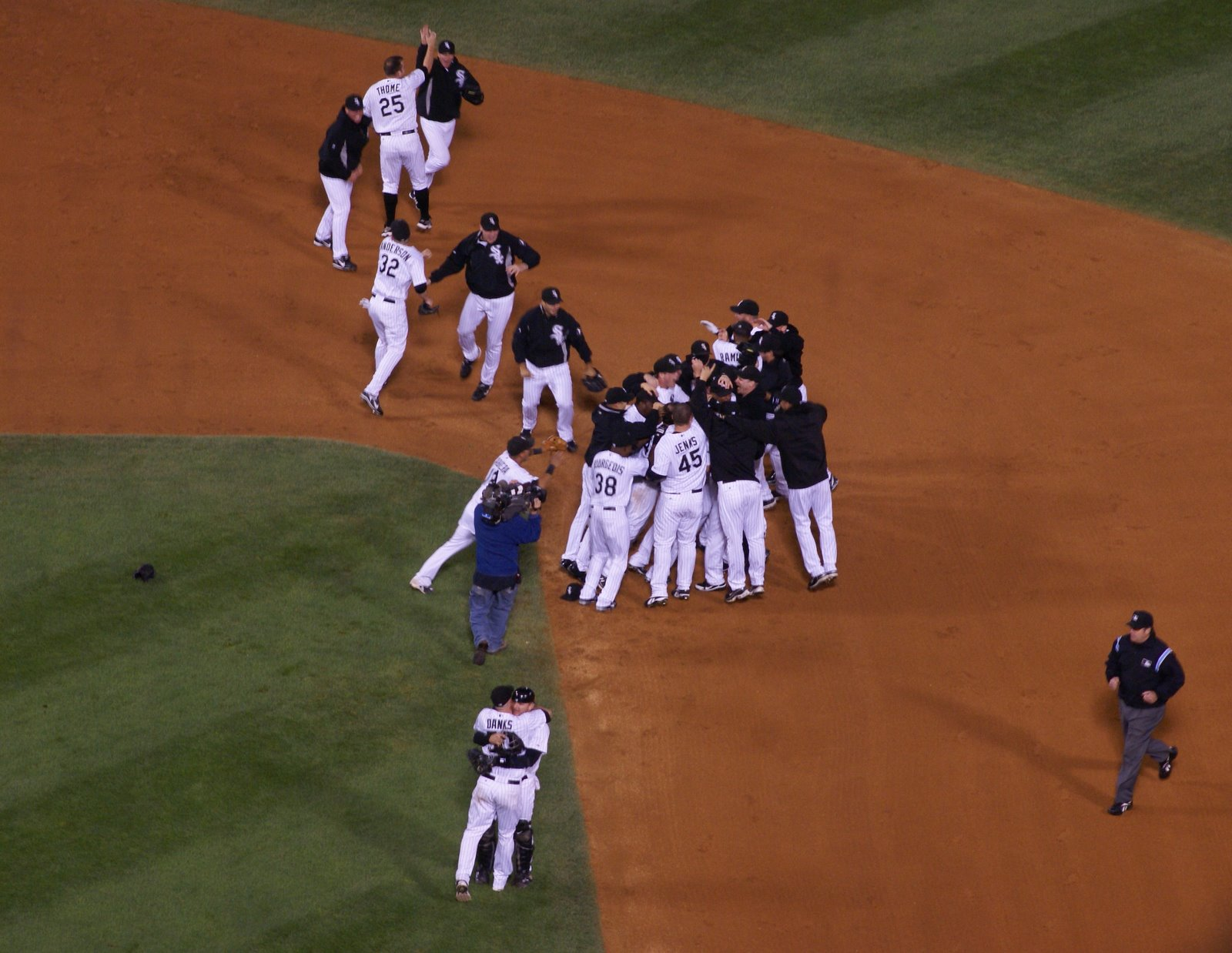
- The White Sox celebrate victory after the final out
	1	2	3	4	5	6	7	8	9	R	H	E
Minnesota Twins	0	0	0	0	0	0	0	0	0	0	2	0
Chicago White Sox	0	0	0	0	0	0	1	0	x	1	5	0
- Date: September 30, 2008
- Venue: U.S. Cellular Field
- City: Chicago, Illinois
- Umpires: HP: Tim McClelland; 1B: Derryl Cousins; 2B: Gary Cederstrom; 3B: Jerry Meals; LF: Ted Barrett; RF: Mike Everitt
- Attendance: 40,354
- Television: TBS
- TV announcers: Dick Stockton, Ron Darling and Harold Reynolds
- Radio: ESPN; KSTP (MIN); WSCR (CHW)
- Radio announcers: ESPN: Dan Shulman and Dave Campbell; KSTP: John Gordon and Dan Gladden; WSCR: Ed Farmer and Steve Stone

The 2008 American League Central tie-breaker game was a one-game extension to Major League Baseball's (MLB) 2008 regular season, played between the Chicago White Sox and Minnesota Twins to determine the champion of the American League's (AL) Central Division. It was played at U.S. Cellular Field in Chicago, Illinois, on September 30, 2008. The White Sox won the game, 1–0, on a home run by Jim Thome, the lowest-scoring game in MLB tie-breaker history. The Sox advanced to the 2008 AL Division Series, where they lost to the Tampa Bay Rays, 3 games to 1; the Twins failed to qualify for the postseason.

The game was necessary after both teams finished the season with identical win–loss records of 88–74. The White Sox won a coin flip late in the season which, by rule, awarded them home field in the game. The tie-breaker counted as the 163rd regular season game by both teams, with all events in the game added to regular season statistics.

== Background ==
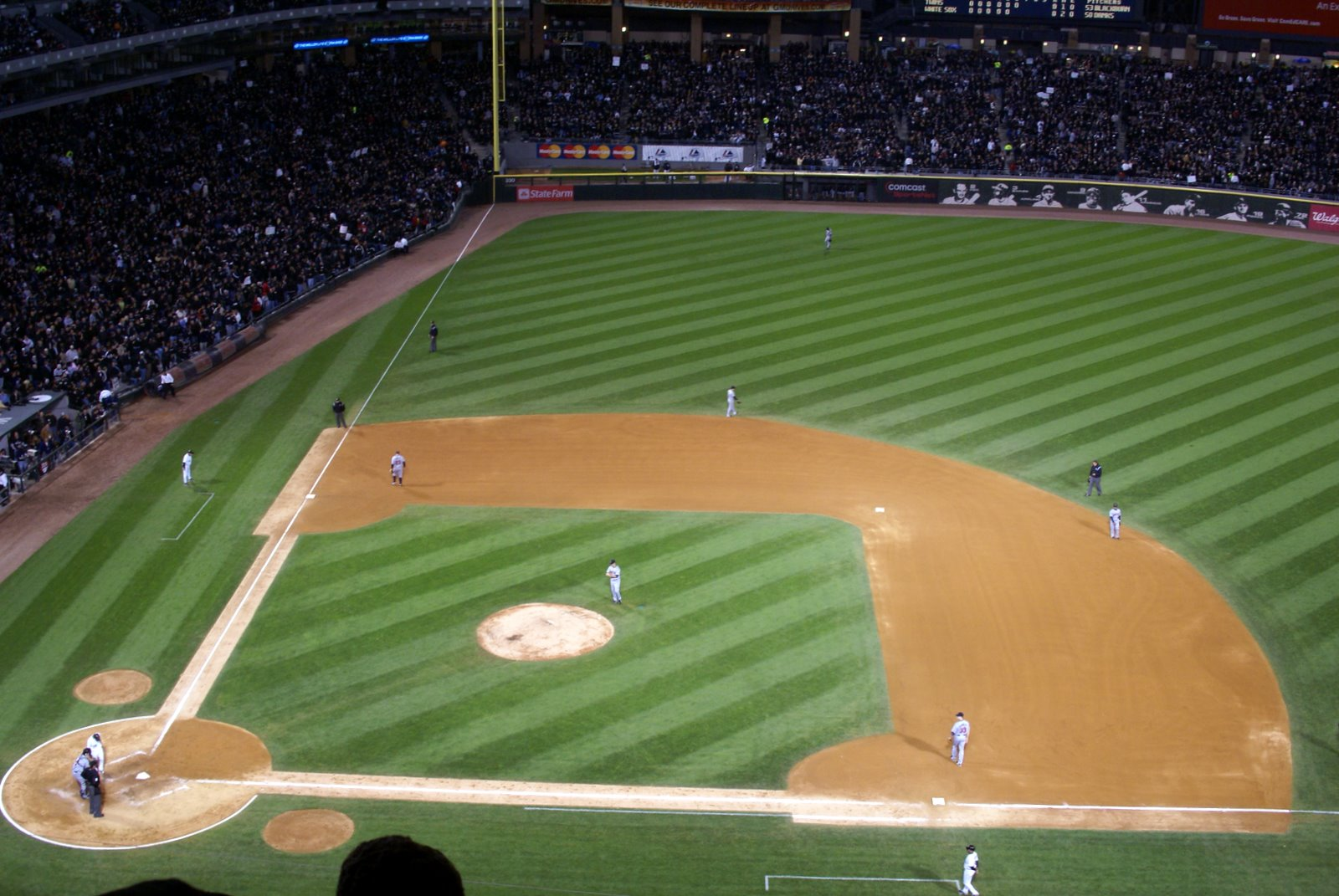
The game was played at U.S. Cellular Field in Chicago. Fans were encouraged to wear black clothing in support of the home team.

Prior to the start of the season, the Detroit Tigers and Cleveland Indians, the division's top two finishers in the previous season, were predicted to be the strongest teams by journalists such as Tom Verducci of ESPN and Joe Sheehan of Baseball Prospectus. However, the Indians lineup was weakened by injuries and spent just 13 days of the season in the division lead, last on May 17. The Tigers never led the AL Central and finished the season in last place, 14 games back.

The White Sox led for most of the season starting with a tie for first on May 17, held at least a share of the lead for 154 days, and never dropped more than a game behind the leader. The Twins spent much of the season in second place behind the White Sox, along with 54 days in the lead. Despite going 11–15 in September, the Twins took a half-game lead with an extra innings win over the White Sox on September 25 that capped a three-game sweep of Chicago. The Twins maintained that lead through their final game, forcing Chicago to play a make-up on September 29 against the Tigers which had been rained out earlier that month. The White Sox won, 8–2, leaving the Sox and Twins tied atop the AL Central with 88–74 records, forcing a tie-breaker to decide the division. Tickets for the tie-breaker sold out within an hour of the end of the September 29 game.

The White Sox won the right to play at U.S. Cellular Field, their home field, as a result of a coin flip earlier in September. Fans were encouraged to wear all-black clothing to show support for the White Sox. The game was broadcast on TBS. The White Sox used John Danks on three days' rest as their starter, and the Twins started Nick Blackburn.

== Game summary ==
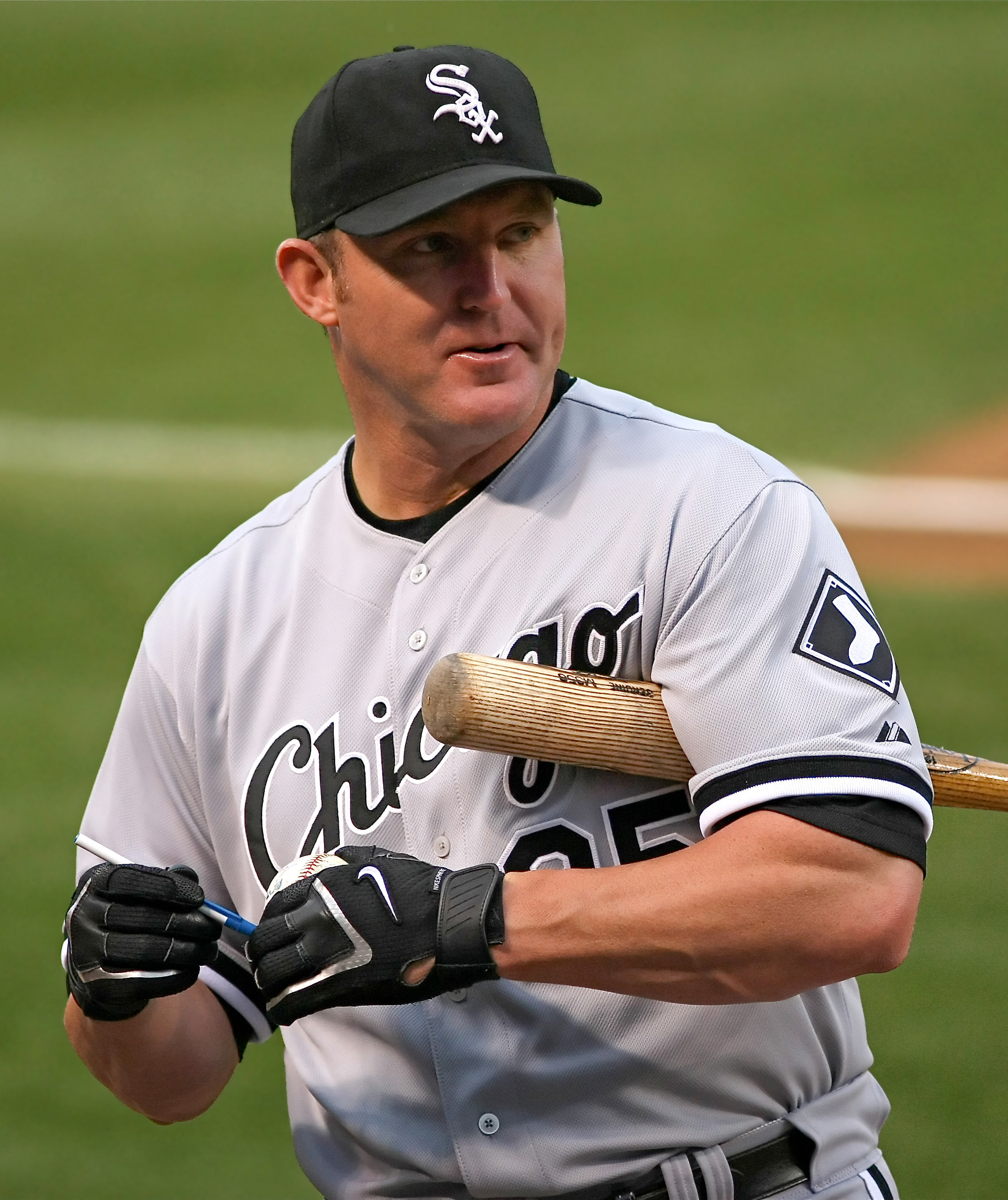
Jim Thome, seen here in the regular season, was responsible for the only run of the game with a solo home run in the 7th inning.

September 30, 2008 6:37 pm (CDT) at U.S. Cellular Field in Chicago, Illinois 55 °F (13 °C), Mostly Cloudy
Team	1	2	3	4	5	6	7	8	9	R	H	E
Minnesota	0	0	0	0	0	0	0	0	0	0	2	0
Chicago	0	0	0	0	0	0	1	0	x	1	5	0
WP: John Danks (12–9) LP: Nick Blackburn (11–11) Sv: Bobby Jenks (30); Home runs: MIN: None; CWS: Jim Thome (34); Attendance: 40,354

Both Blackburn and Danks held the game scoreless early on, allowing only six baserunners through the first four innings of the game. The Twins' Michael Cuddyer led off the top of the fifth with a double, the only Twins runner in scoring position for the entire game. Danks induced a deep flyball out from Delmon Young, which allowed Cuddyer to advance to third. Brendan Harris hit a deep flyball to center field which was caught for an out by Ken Griffey Jr. Cuddyer tried to score on the ball as a sacrifice fly, but Griffey delivered an accurate throw to home plate and White Sox catcher A. J. Pierzynski blocked the plate and tagged out Cuddyer to end the inning. This play drew praise after the game as a "nice throw" and a "defensive gem".

The only run of the game scored when White Sox designated hitter Jim Thome led off the bottom of the seventh inning with a home run. Blackburn got Paul Konerko to ground out, but allowed a double to Griffey and, following an intentional walk to Alexei Ramírez, José Mijares relieved him. John Danks lasted through eight innings without allowing a run and was relieved by closer Bobby Jenks in the ninth. Jenks recorded three outs, securing the White Sox' 1–0 victory with his 30th save of the season. Twins batters Joe Mauer, Justin Morneau, and Cuddyer had a combined 22 hits in 40 at-bats (.550 batting average) against Danks for their careers but in the tie-breaker they combined to go 1–for-9 (.111) with 3 strikeouts. This game saw the lowest combined score of any tie-breaker game in MLB history, three runs lower than the 3–1 score of the first game of the 1951 National League tie-breaker series.

== Aftermath ==
With the victory, the White Sox earned their first playoff berth since their win in the 2005 World Series. However, they lost to the Tampa Bay Rays, 3 games to 1 in the AL Division Series.

Statistically, the game counted as the 163rd regular season game. Thome's home run, for example, was his 34th of the season. This total brought him a tie for fourth most in the league. Danks lowered his earned run average from 3.47 to 3.32 in the game, which moved him from a tie for tenth-best in the league to fifth place. Mauer, Morneau, and White Sox outfielder Carlos Quentin won Silver Slugger Awards for their offensive performances in the 2008 regular season. Mauer also won a Rawlings Gold Glove Award that year. This was the last tie-breaker with home field determined by a coin flip. Following the 2008 season MLB amended its rules, leaving future tie-breaker sites to be determined on a series of performance-based criteria beginning with the head-to-head record between the teams.
