= Alexei Ramírez =

Cuban baseball player (born 1981)

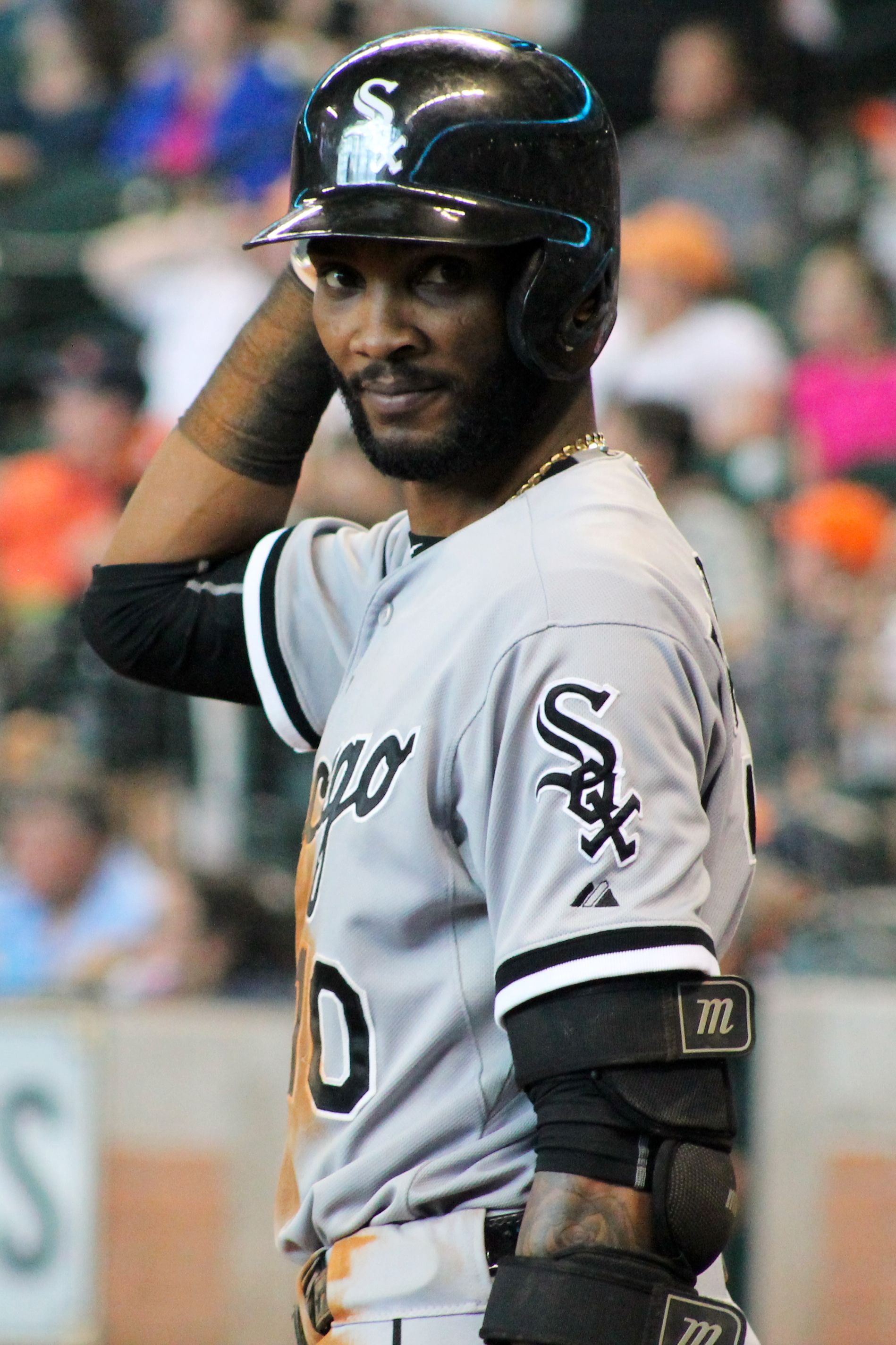
- Ramírez with the Chicago White Sox

Vegueros de Pinar del Río
- Shortstop
- Born: September 22, 1981 (age 44); Pinar del Río, Cuba
- Batted: Right Threw: Right

MLB debut
- March 31, 2008, for the Chicago White Sox

Last MLB appearance
- October 2, 2016, for the Tampa Bay Rays

MLB statistics
- Batting average: .270
- Home runs: 115
- Runs batted in: 590
- Stats at Baseball Reference

Teams
- Chicago White Sox (2008–2015); San Diego Padres (2016); Tampa Bay Rays (2016)

Career highlights and awards
- All-Star (2014); 2× Silver Slugger Award (2010, 2014)
Medals
Men's baseball
Representing Cuba
World Baseball Classic
Silver medal – second place	2006 San Diego	Team
Olympic Games
Gold medal – first place	2004 Athens	Team
Baseball World Cup
Gold medal – first place	2005 Rotterdam	Team
Intercontinental Cup
Gold medal – first place	2006 Taichung	Team
Central American and Caribbean Games
Gold medal – first place	2006 Cartagena	Team
Pan American Games
Gold medal – first place	2007 Rio de Janeiro	Team

Alexei Fernando Ramírez Rodriguez (born September 22, 1981) is a Cuban professional baseball shortstop for Vegueros de Pinar del Río of the Cuban National Series. He previously played in Major League Baseball (MLB) for the Chicago White Sox, San Diego Padres and Tampa Bay Rays. His nickname, given to him by former White Sox manager Ozzie Guillén, is "the Cuban Missile" due to his tall, slim physique and combination of speed, power, and strong throwing arm. Ramírez batted and threw right-handed.

== Early career ==
In seven years of baseball in the Cuban National Series, Ramírez spent most of his time playing shortstop and outfield for Pinar del Rio. He had a batting average of .332 in Cuba, and led the league in 2007 with 20 home runs while posting a .335 average. Ramírez played center field for Cuba at the 2006 World Baseball Classic, collecting six hits in 16 at-bats and impressing Major League Baseball scouts in the process.

== Professional career ==
=== Chicago White Sox ===
In September 2007, Ramírez left Cuba to apply for citizenship in the Dominican Republic, and also apply to Major League Baseball to enter free agency, according to his agent, Jaime Torres. He auditioned for many baseball teams before coming to an agreement on a four-year, $8 million contract with the Chicago White Sox on December 21, 2007.

==== 2008 season ====
Ramírez made his MLB debut on March 31, 2008 against the Cleveland Indians, finishing the game 0-for-4 as the starting center fielder. He recorded his first major league hit on April 2, a single off Indians reliever Jorge Julio. Ramírez hit his first major league home run on May 16, off San Francisco Giants reliever Billy Sadler.

Ramírez hit his first career grand slam on July 22, 2008. On September 19, Ramírez hit his third grand slam of the season off of pitcher Brian Bannister of the Kansas City Royals, tying an American League rookie record set by Shane Spencer of the New York Yankees in 1998. It was the White Sox's eleventh grand slam of the season, equaling the previous club record from 2006. On September 29, Ramírez hit his fourth grand slam of the season, setting a major-league single-season record for a rookie, off of Detroit Tigers pitcher Gary Glover in an 8–2 Sox victory to qualify the Sox for a one-game tiebreaker against the Minnesota Twins for the AL Central title. This also broke the team record for most grand slams in a single season.

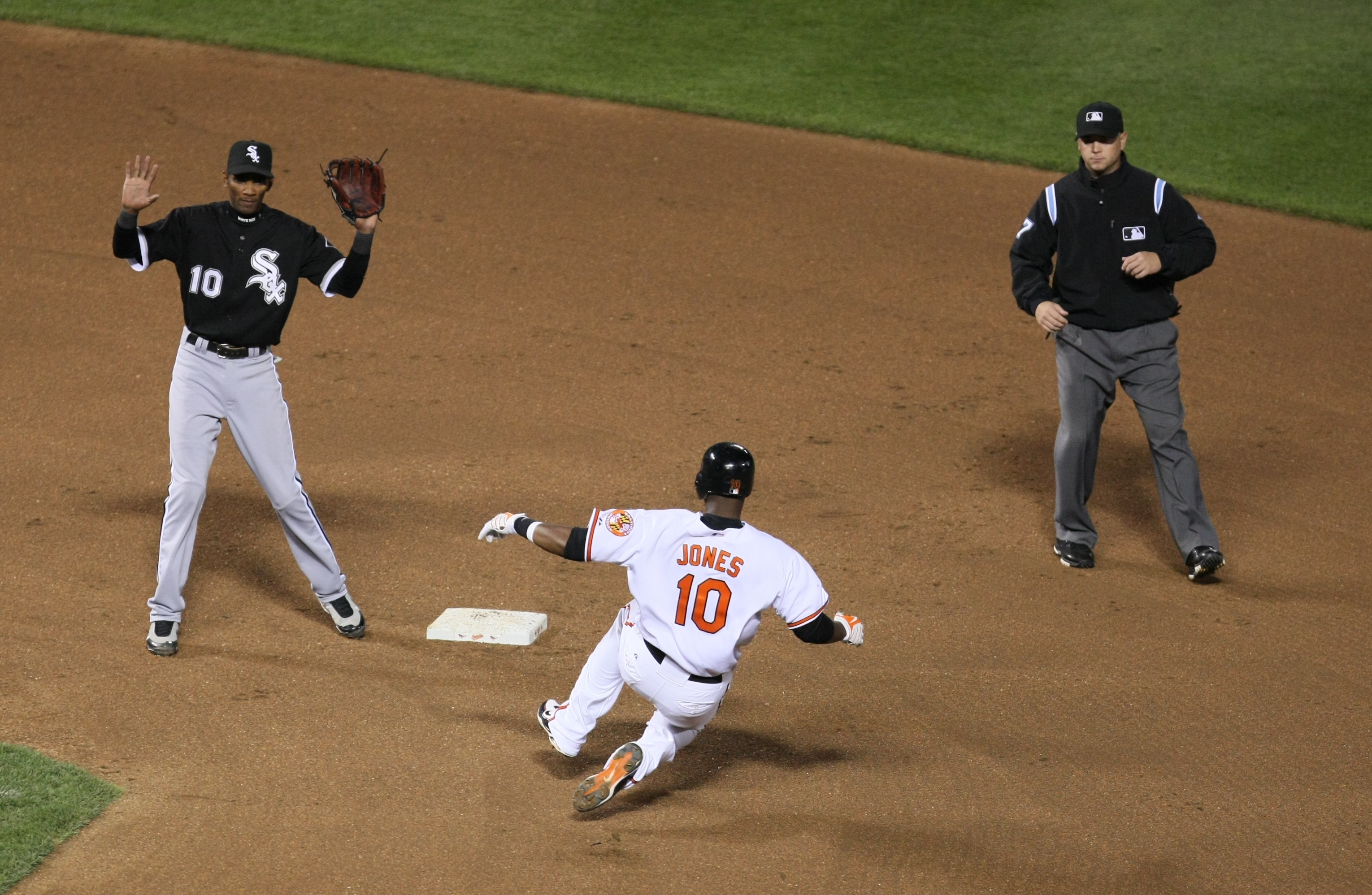
Ramírez with Adam Jones and umpire Scott Barry in 2009.

During his first season in the Majors, Ramírez excelled both offensively and in the field, despite primarily playing second base instead of his customary shortstop position. Over 136 games, he posted a .290 batting average, hitting 21 homers and recording 77 RBI. He finished in second place in the voting for American League Rookie of the Year honors, losing to Evan Longoria of the Tampa Bay Rays. Ramírez led the major leagues in grand slam home runs in 2008, with four, and also swung at 59% of all pitches he saw for the season, also the most in the majors.

==== 2009 season ====
Ramírez appeared in 148 games in his second MLB season. He posted a .277 batting average, 15 home runs, 68 RBI, and 15 stolen bases. He fielded a ground ball for the final out of Mark Buehrle's July 23, 2009 perfect game.

==== 2010 season ====
Ramírez saw action in 156 games with Chicago. His batting average climbed to .282 and he tallied 18 homers and 70 RBI. He also won the American League Silver Slugger Award for the shortstop position.

==== 2011 season ====
On January 31, 2011, Ramírez signed a four-year, $32.5 million contract with the White Sox that included a club option for a fifth year. In 158 games, Ramírez posted a .269 batting average, 15 home runs, and 70 RBI.

==== 2012 season ====
Ramírez again appeared in 158 games, as his batting average dipped slightly to .265. His home run total decreased to nine, but he still had 73 RBI. He also set a new career high with 20 steals.

==== 2013 season ====
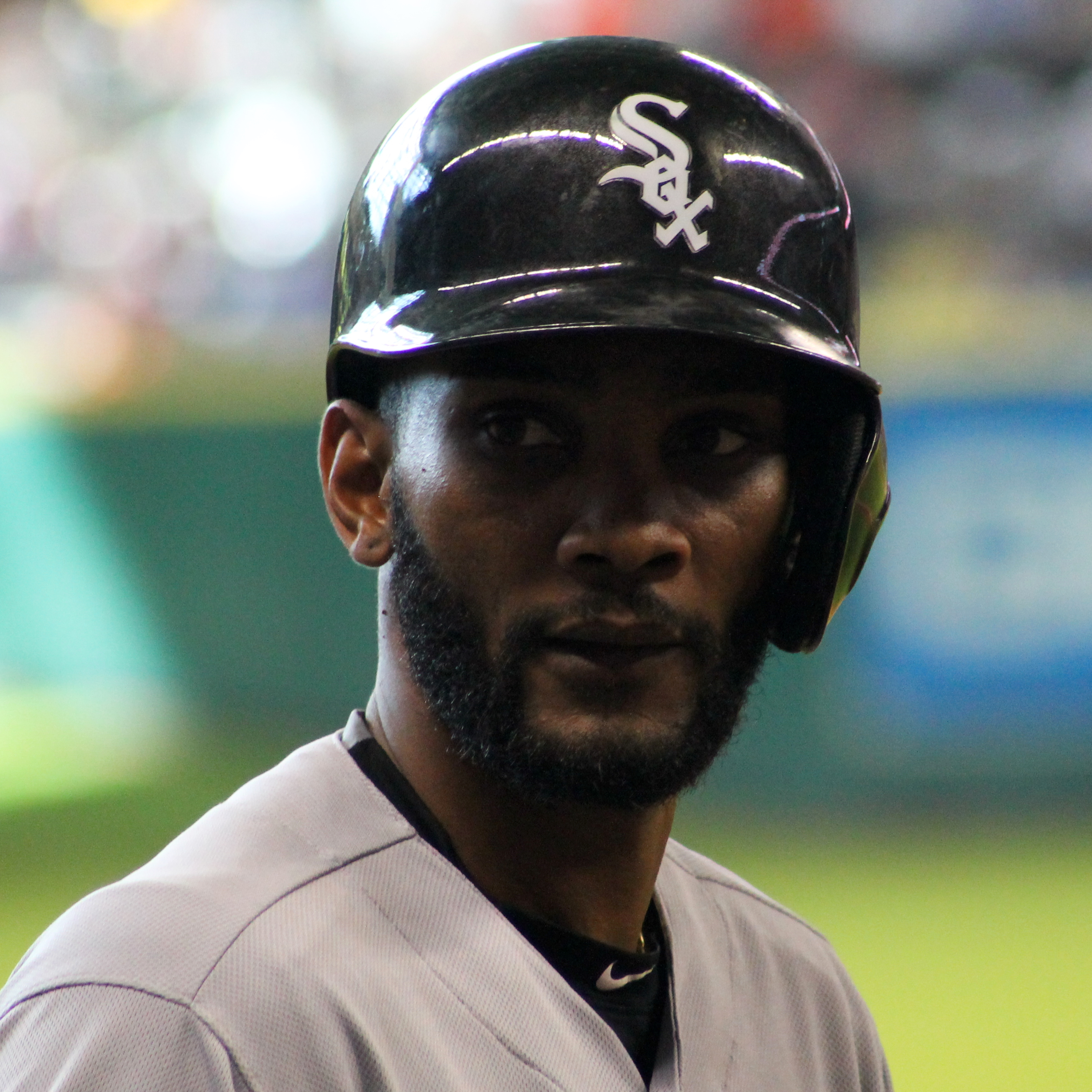
Ramírez in 2015.

For a third consecutive season, Ramírez saw action in exactly 158 games. His batting average of .284 was the highest since his rookie season. His power numbers fell further as he hit only six homers and recorded 48 RBI. He also stole 30 bases, surpassing his previous career best from the year before.

==== 2014 season ====
On May 5, 2014, Ramírez recorded his 1,000th career hit off of Chicago Cubs' pitcher Justin Grimm in the 12th inning of the Crosstown Classic.

Ramírez was announced to his first All-Star game at the 2014 MLB All-Star Game along with teammates Chris Sale and fellow countryman José Abreu. He replaced Derek Jeter in the field in what was previously announced to be the Yankee star's final MLB season.

==== 2015 season ====
On November 4, 2015, the White Sox declined Ramírez's $10 million option for the 2016 season, making him a free agent.

=== San Diego Padres ===
On January 22, 2016, Ramírez signed a one-year, $3 million contract with the San Diego Padres, with a $4 million mutual option for 2017. He broke up Steven Matz's no-hit bid with a RBI single in a game against the New York Mets on August 14. Ramírez appeared in 128 games with the Padres, mainly at shortstop; he batted .240, with five home runs and 41 RBI. He was released by the Padres on September 4.

=== Tampa Bay Rays ===
On September 8, 2016, Ramírez signed a major league contract with the Tampa Bay Rays. He appeared in 17 games with Tampa Bay, tallying a .246 average, one home run, and seven RBI. On November 3, Ramírez became a free agent.

=== Diablos Rojos del México ===
On February 8, 2018, Ramírez signed with the Diablos Rojos del México of the Mexican League. He made 37 appearances for the Diablos, batting .236/.306/.340 with two home runs, 19 RBI, and one stole base. Ramírez was released by the team on August 16.

In May 2020, Ramírez announced he was still seeking professional baseball opportunities. He later confirmed his retirement the next year.

=== Return to Pinar del Rio ===
In 2024, Ramírez returned to the Cuban National Series to play for Pinar del Rio, which he played for prior to defecting in 2007.

== See also ==
- List of baseball players who defected from Cuba
