= John Danks =

American baseball player (born 1985)

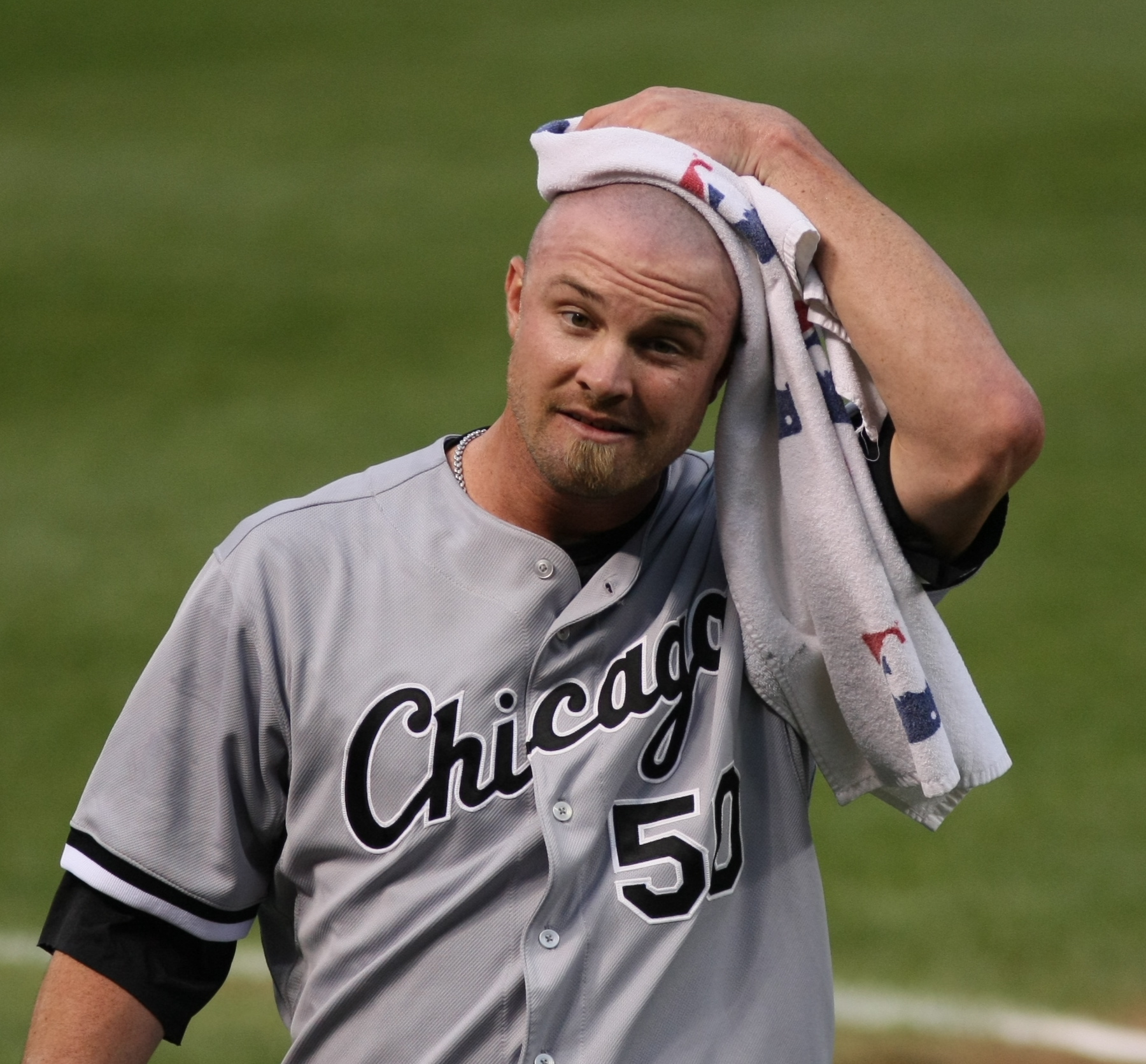
- Danks with the Chicago White Sox
- Pitcher
- Born: April 15, 1985 (age 41); Austin, Texas, U.S.
- Batted: Left Threw: Left

MLB debut
- April 8, 2007, for the Chicago White Sox

Last MLB appearance
- April 28, 2016, for the Chicago White Sox

MLB statistics
- Win–loss record: 79–104
- Earned run average: 4.38
- Strikeouts: 1,102
- Stats at Baseball Reference

Teams
- Chicago White Sox (2007–2016)

John William Danks (born April 15, 1985) is an American former professional baseball pitcher. He played in Major League Baseball (MLB) for the Chicago White Sox.

== Personal life ==
Danks graduated from Round Rock High School in Texas in 2003 and was named the co-central Texas player of the year that season. Danks was drafted in the first round, ninth overall in the 2003 Major League Baseball draft by the Texas Rangers. His brother, Jordan Danks, was his teammate on the White Sox from 2012 to 2014. Danks proposed to girlfriend, country artist Ashley Monroe of the Pistol Annies, on September 14, 2012, after Monroe finished the Annies' first show of their headlining tour. They were married on October 24, 2013.

== Professional career ==
=== Minor Leagues ===
Danks, along with pitchers Nick Masset and Jacob Rasner, was traded by the Rangers to the White Sox for pitcher Brandon McCarthy and outfielder David Paisano on December 23, 2006.

=== Chicago White Sox ===
As a top prospect for the Chicago White Sox in 2007, he was selected as the team's fifth starter in their rotation. The 72–90 White Sox provided Danks with little support in the first half of the season; he was 5–6 with an acceptable 4.62 ERA before the break. Down the stretch, Danks tired, and he was shut down for the year after a slow September start. Danks finished the second half 1–7 with a 7.11 ERA. For the season, he finished with a record of 6–13 with a dismal 5.50 ERA in 26 starts.

The White Sox opted to use Danks in the starting rotation again in 2008 and he did not disappoint. The second-year lefty pitched masterfully, ranking among the league leaders in ERA all season and taking no-hit games beyond the fifth inning on several occasions. Danks set career bests in nearly every major statistical category, finishing with a 12–9 record, 3.32 ERA (fifth in the American League) and 1.23 WHIP in 33 starts. Danks finished just short of the benchmark 200 regular-season innings, hurling 195.

Making his first career short-rest start in the one-game playoff for the American League Central Division title, Danks defeated the visiting Minnesota Twins 1–0 with eight dominant innings of two-hit ball. The victory propelled the White Sox into the postseason.

Danks followed up his stellar 2008 season onto the 2009 season as he finished with a record of 13–11 in 32 starts, along with a 3.77 ERA in 200 1/3 innings. He set career highs in the 2010 season in wins (15), innings (213) and strikeouts (162).

The 2011 season saw Danks struggle through injury, as he made only 27 starts. He finished with a record of 8–12 and a 4.33 ERA in 170 1/3 innings.

On December 29, 2011, Danks agreed to terms with the White Sox on a five-year, $65 million deal, which took him through his final arbitration eligible season and his first four free agency years. Danks made $8 million in 2012 and $14.25 million from 2013 to 2016.

On May 25, 2012, Danks was placed on the 15-day disabled list with a left shoulder strain. That injury turned out to be season-ending, as he had surgery on August 6 on his left shoulder to "explore and correct issues" found there. He was hoping to come back in late September, but instead opted towards having the surgery so he could be ready for 2013 spring training. In nine starts with Chicago, he went 3–4 with a 5.70 ERA with 30 strikeouts in 53.2 innings.

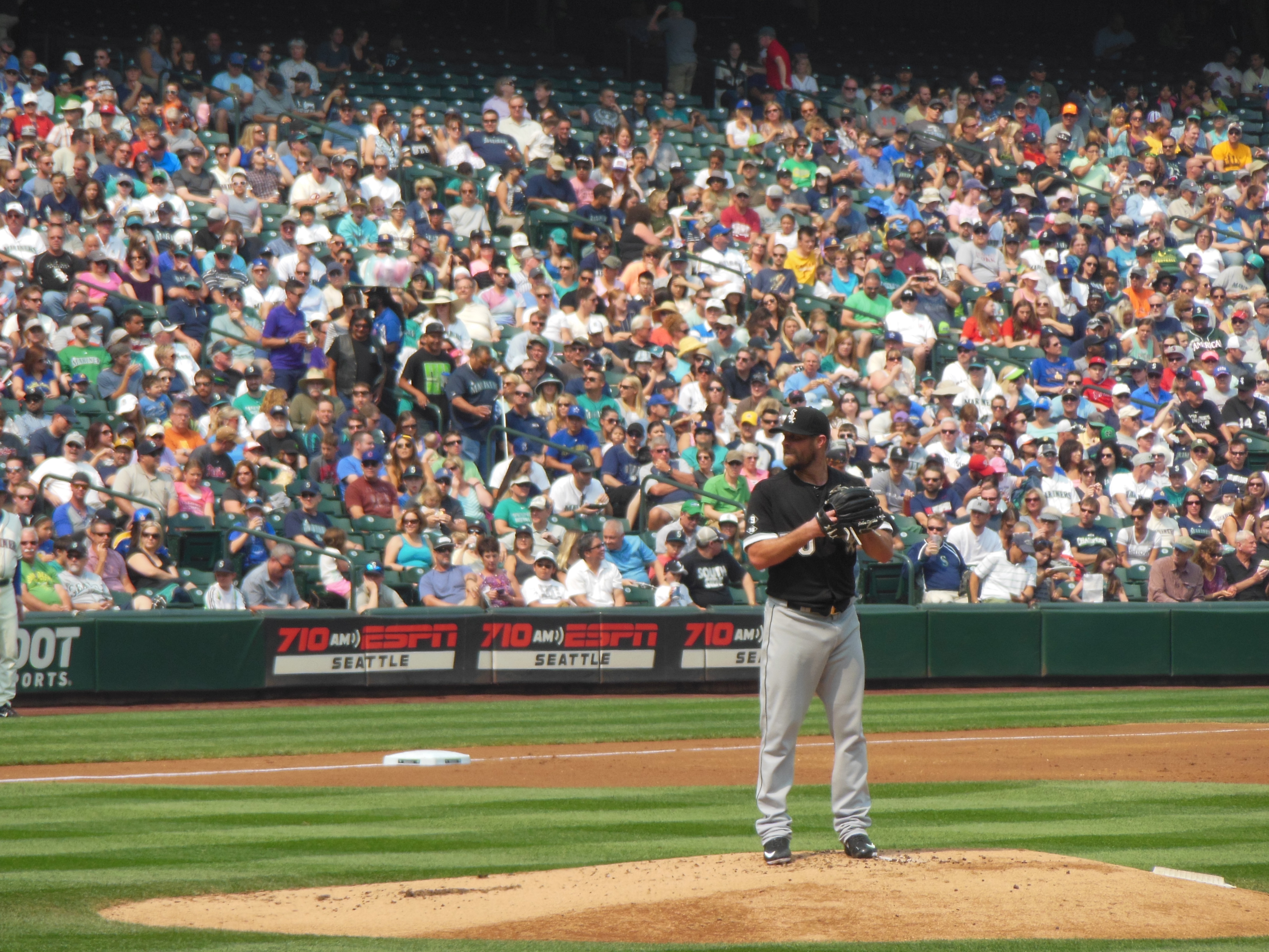
Danks on the mound in Seattle in 2015

On August 25, 2013, Danks was the winning pitcher during a 5–2 victory over the Texas Rangers. During that game his brother, Jordan Danks, hit a go-ahead home run. According to Elias Sports Bureau, it was the first time since June 5, 1955, that a player homered in support of his brother pitching, when Kansas City Athletics catcher Billy Shantz homered in support of his brother Bobby Shantz. Overall, Danks struggled through injury once again as he finished with a 4–14 record with a 4.75 ERA in 22 starts. In 2014, Danks was healthy throughout the season for the first time since 2010. He finished with a record of 11–11 with a 4.74 ERA in 32 starts.

In 2015, Danks pitched through the worst season of his career since his rookie season as he finished with a career worst 7–15 record with a 4.71 ERA in 30 starts.

On May 3, 2016, Danks was designated for assignment after struggling early in the 2016 season with a 7.25 ERA after four starts.

=== Atlanta Braves ===
Danks signed a minor league contract with the Atlanta Braves in December 2016. He was released on March 20, 2017.

== See also ==
- List of Major League Baseball players who spent their entire career with one franchise
