= Gavin Floyd =

American baseball player (born 1983)

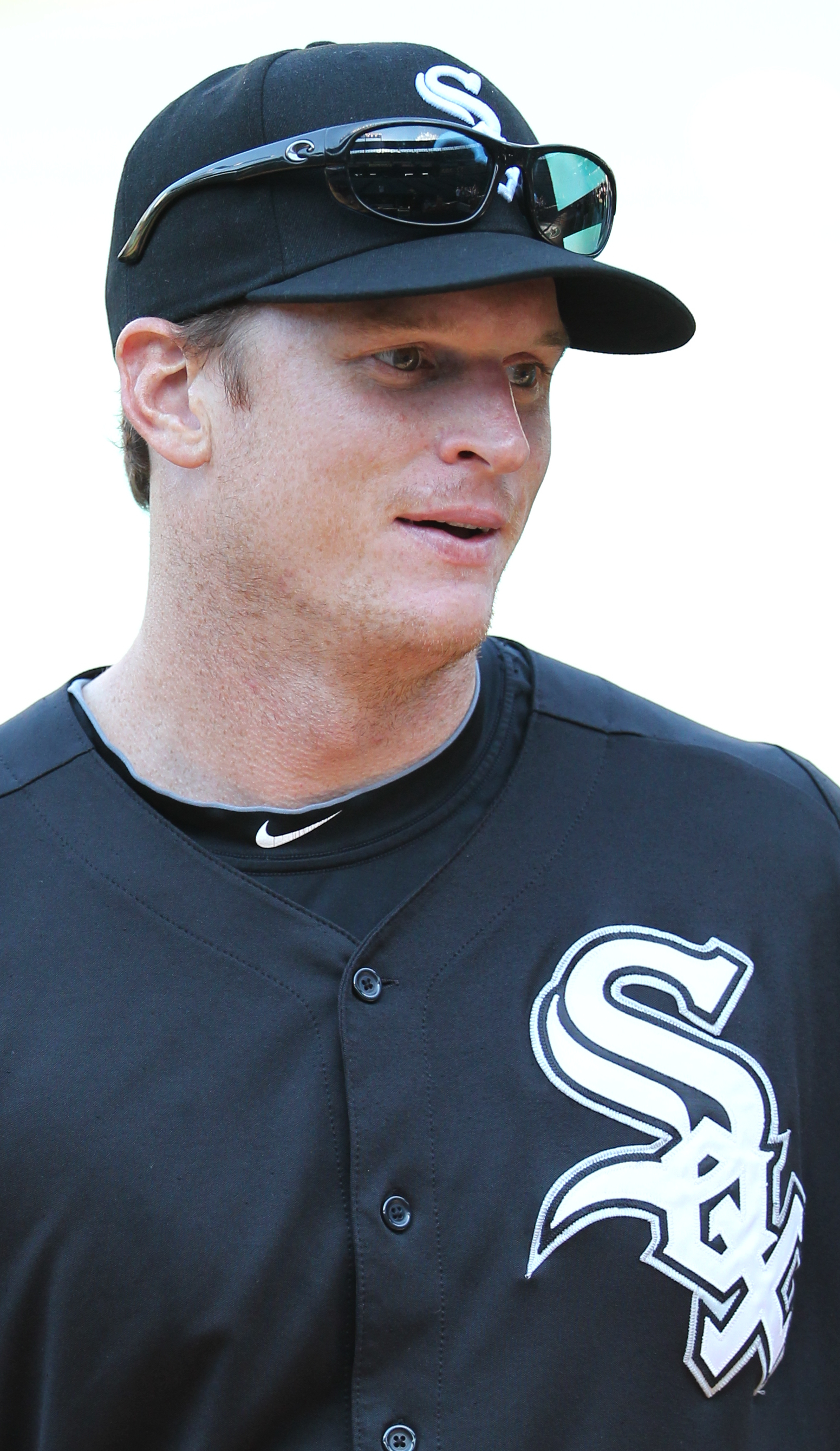
- Floyd with the Chicago White Sox in 2011
- Pitcher
- Born: January 27, 1983 (age 43); Annapolis, Maryland, U.S.
- Batted: Right Threw: Right

MLB debut
- September 3, 2004, for the Philadelphia Phillies

Last MLB appearance
- June 25, 2016, for the Toronto Blue Jays

Career statistics
- Win–loss record: 74–76
- Earned run average: 4.37
- Strikeouts: 985
- Stats at Baseball Reference

Teams
- Philadelphia Phillies (2004–2006); Chicago White Sox (2007–2013); Atlanta Braves (2014); Cleveland Indians (2015); Toronto Blue Jays (2016)

Gavin Christopher Floyd (born January 27, 1983) is an American former professional baseball pitcher, who played in Major League Baseball (MLB) for the Philadelphia Phillies, Chicago White Sox, Atlanta Braves, Cleveland Indians, and Toronto Blue Jays.

== Amateur career ==
Born in Annapolis, Maryland and raised in Severna Park, Maryland, Floyd attended Mount Saint Joseph High School in Baltimore, alongside fellow major leaguer Mark Teixeira, who grew up on adjacent streets. Teixeira, who is three years older than Floyd, was also selected in the first round of the 2001 MLB draft.

== Professional career ==
=== Draft and minor leagues ===
The Philadelphia Phillies selected Floyd out of high school with the fourth overall selection of the 2001 draft. Floyd, who had originally made a verbal commitment to attend the University of South Carolina, opted instead to play in major league baseball.

In his first professional season (2002), Floyd pitched for the Class A Lakewood BlueClaws of the South Atlantic League (SAL). A highlight of his most impressive first season (2.77 ERA, .200 BAA) was pitching the first nine-inning no-hitter in BlueClaws history on July 24 against the Lexington Legends.

In 2004, Floyd was a non-roster invitee to spring training. He began the season with the Reading Phillies (AA) and did not allow any runs in his first four starts, allowing only one runner to make it past second base. He was named the Phillies farm system Minor League Pitcher of the Week, as well as Phillies Minor League Pitcher of the Month for April (2–0, 0.00 ERA). He was promoted to the Scranton/Wilkes-Barre Red Barons (AAA) in July and made five starts before having his contract purchased by Phillies as a September callup.

=== Philadelphia Phillies ===
Floyd made his Major League debut September 3, 2004, against the division rival New York Mets and earned the win pitching seven strong innings allowing only one run on four hits, while striking out five.

In 2005, Floyd made the Phillies out of spring training. He made his first start of the season on April 9, pitched seven strong innings of one-run ball in a win against the St. Louis Cardinals. However, Floyd struggled thereafter and was demoted to the minors, where he continued to struggle through to the end of the 2005 season. In seven games (four starts) with the Phillies, he was 1–2 with a 10.04 ERA, and 6–9 with a 6.16 ERA in 24 games (23 starts) with the Red Barons.

Floyd came to 2006 spring training with barely a consideration and pitched his way into the Phillies rotation as the #4 pitcher, pushing Ryan Franklin to the bullpen. However, once again Floyd struggled, with a 4–3 record and a 7.29 ERA in 11 starts, and on June 2, was demoted to Scranton/Wilkes-Barre for the second straight year.

=== Chicago White Sox ===
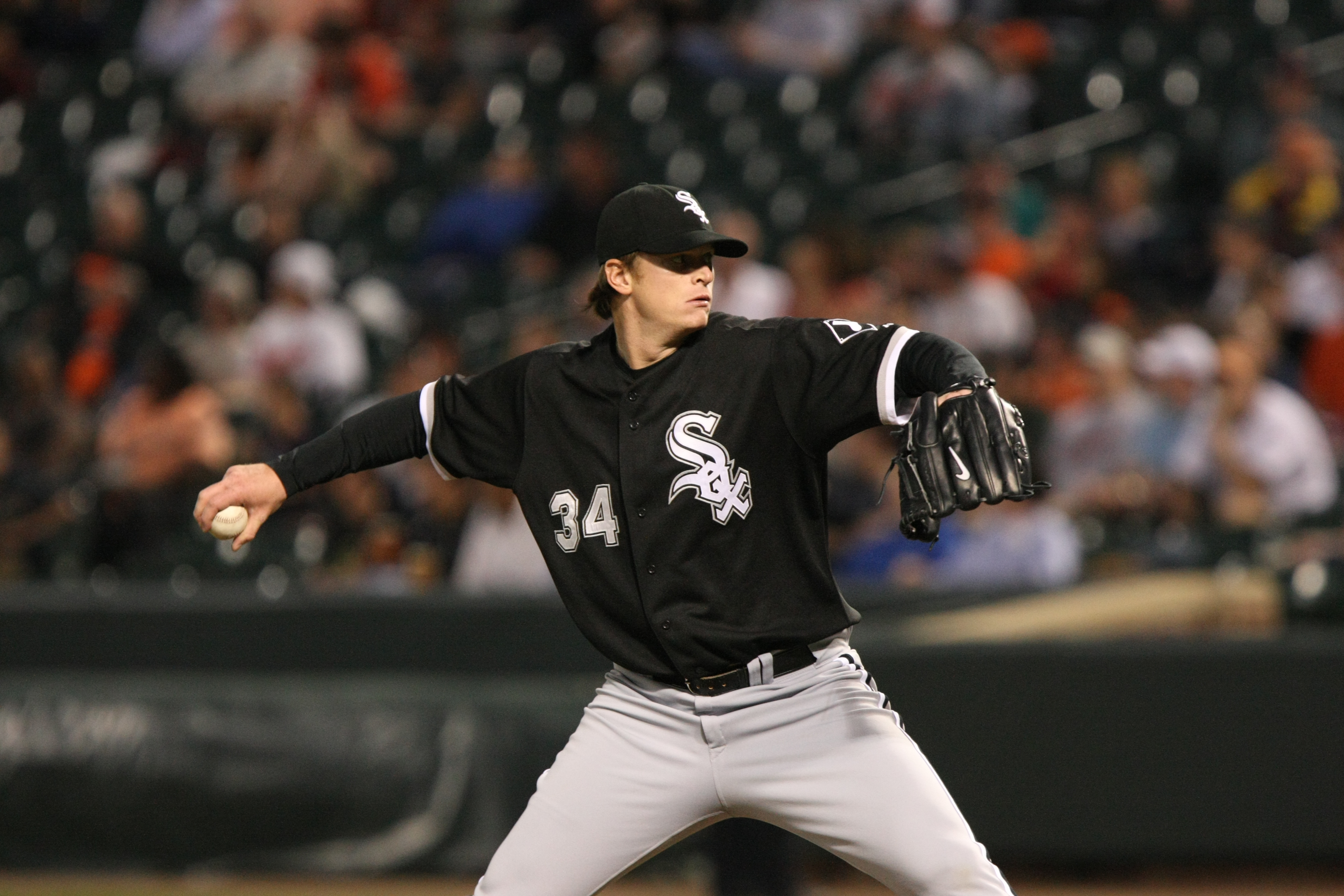
Floyd in 2008

On December 6, 2006, Floyd was traded with Gio González to the Chicago White Sox for Freddy García. Floyd was expected to be handed the spot vacated by Garcia. However, since he pitched poorly during spring training, Floyd lost the spot and was optioned to Triple-A Charlotte.

On July 5, 2007, Floyd was recalled from Triple-A Charlotte by the White Sox. A day later, he pitched his first start as a South Sider in the second game of a doubleheader against Matt Garza of the Minnesota Twins, earning the loss and yielding six runs in 5.2 innings of work; the White Sox would eventually be blown out of the game, losing 12–0 to the rival Minnesota Twins.

In 2008, Floyd emerged as a legitimate and solid starting pitcher at the back end of the White Sox rotation. Showing flashes of brilliance, he carried two near-no-hitters against visiting Detroit (April 12) and Minnesota (May 6) into the eighth and ninth innings, respectively, and also retired 12 consecutive Baltimore Orioles to start an eventual 6–5 extra inning loss in Baltimore on April 17. He finished the regular season with a 17–8 record and a 3.84 ERA in 33 starts, with his final win coming in a game which the White Sox beat the Detroit Tigers to force a one-game playoff with the Twins to determine the Central's winner. During 2008 he led the majors in stolen bases allowed with 37 – nine more than the next closest pitcher.

Floyd signed again with the White Sox on March 22, 2009; with his four-year contract worth $15.5 million. During the 2009 season, Floyd started 30 games, posting an 11–11 record and an ERA of 4.06, while cutting the number of stolen bases he allowed to 14.

Floyd only started five games with a 0–4 record and an ERA of 5.18 during the 2013 season. On April 28, 2013, Floyd was placed on the 15-day disabled list due to a flexor muscle strain in his right elbow. After an MRI revealed his elbow had a torn flexor muscle and UCL, Floyd underwent Tommy John surgery on May 7, 2013 and was shut down for the rest of the 2013 season. He became a free agent following the season.

=== Atlanta Braves ===
On December 16, 2013, Floyd signed a one-year, $4 million contract with the Atlanta Braves. In June 2014, Floyd suffered a fractured olecranon, missing the rest of the season. Alex Wood replaced Floyd in the rotation.

=== Cleveland Indians ===
On December 16, 2014, Floyd signed a one-year, $4 million contract with the Cleveland Indians, but was subsequently placed on the 60-day disabled list on April 5, 2015 after injuring his pitching elbow during spring training. Floyd made his Indians debut on September 2, 2015, pitching a single inning of relief.

=== Toronto Blue Jays ===
On February 6, 2016, Floyd signed a one-year, $1 million contract with the Toronto Blue Jays. Floyd entered spring training in competition for the fifth starter role with Aaron Sanchez, Drew Hutchison, and Jesse Chavez. On March 28, it was announced Sanchez would be the team's fifth starter, while Floyd would begin the season in the bullpen. Floyd left a game against the White Sox on June 25 with a shoulder injury, and was placed on the 15-day disabled list after the game. On June 28, it was determined he had torn his right lat muscle and would miss 8–12 weeks recovering. Floyd remained on the disabled list for the rest of the 2016 season. He finished the season with a 2–4 record, 4.06 ERA in 28 games, striking out 30 batters in 31 innings pitched. He became a free agent following the season.

On January 5, 2017, Floyd signed a minor league contract with the Blue Jays which included an invitation to spring training. He did not appear in any spring training games, and was released on April 5.

== Pitching style ==
Floyd threw five pitches, leading with a four-seam fastball at 90–93 mph. He also threw a two-seam fastball (90–93), a slider (85–87), a curveball (79–81), and a changeup to left-handed hitters (mid 80s). His curve was a favored option with two strikes.
