= Nick Masset =

American baseball player (born 1982)

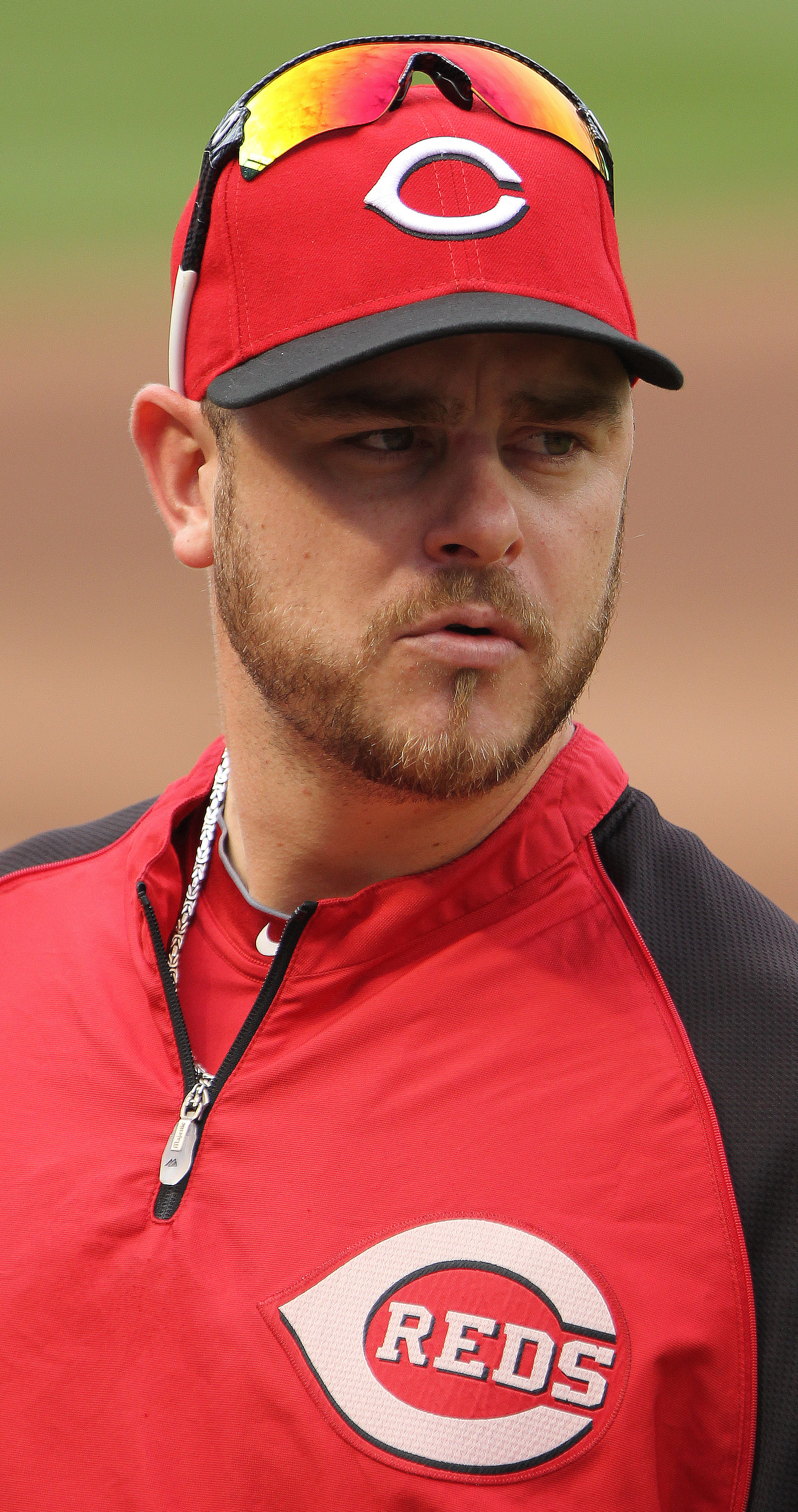
- Masset with the Cincinnati Reds
- Pitcher
- Born: May 17, 1982 (age 44); St. Petersburg, Florida, U.S.
- Batted: Right Threw: Right

MLB debut
- June 27, 2006, for the Texas Rangers

Last MLB appearance
- July 5, 2015, for the Atlanta Braves

MLB statistics
- Win–loss record: 20–16
- Earned run average: 4.06
- Strikeouts: 339
- Stats at Baseball Reference

Teams
- Texas Rangers (2006); Chicago White Sox (2007–2008); Cincinnati Reds (2008–2011); Colorado Rockies (2014); Miami Marlins (2015); Atlanta Braves (2015)

Nicholas Allen Masset (born May 17, 1982) is an American former professional baseball pitcher, who played for the Texas Rangers, Chicago White Sox, Cincinnati Reds, Colorado Rockies, Miami Marlins, and Atlanta Braves of Major League Baseball (MLB). He attended Pinellas Park High School.

== Career ==
=== Texas Rangers ===
Masset was drafted in the eighth round (244th overall) of the 2000 Major League Baseball draft by the Texas Rangers. He had UCL replacement surgery in March of his senior year prior to the draft. Masset was a draft and follow and played for the St. Petersburg Jr College Trojans for one season before signing with the Rangers on May 28, 2001. Masset had minor league stints with the Single-A Stockton Ports, Double-A Frisco RoughRiders and Triple-A Oklahoma RedHawks prior to his first call-up in June 2006.

=== Chicago White Sox ===
Masset was traded to the Chicago White Sox on December 23, 2006, along with John Danks and Jacob Rasner for Brandon McCarthy and David Paisano.

=== Cincinnati Reds ===
On July 31, 2008, Masset, along with infielder Danny Richar, was traded to the Cincinnati Reds for Ken Griffey Jr. After the trade, Masset appeared in 10 games for the Reds, going 1–0 with an ERA of 2.08 in 17 1/3 innings. The 2009 season saw Masset going 5–1 in 76 innings with an earned run average of 2.37 in 74 games. In 2010, Masset went 4–4 in 76 2/3 innings with an ERA of 3.40 in a career-high 82 appearances. In 2011, Masset made 75 appearances and went 3–6 in 70 1/3 innings to an ERA of 3.71. At the start of the 2012 season, Masset was sidelined with a right shoulder injury and was placed on the disabled list. He would not pitch all year before having surgery on September 7 to repair a torn anterior capsule. Masset was expected to be ready for the start of the 2013 season but would again miss the entire season. Masset had surgery to correct thoracic outlet syndrome.

=== Colorado Rockies ===
Masset agreed to a minor league contract with the Colorado Rockies for the 2014 season. He was called up on May 5, relieving for the first time in two years. On June 17, Masset was suspended for three games following an incident against Atlanta in which he was ejected for throwing at Evan Gattis. Masset elected not to appeal the suspension and began serving it on June 17. He finished the season 2–0 with a 5.80 ERA in 51 appearances.

=== Miami Marlins ===
Masset signed a minor league contract with the Miami Marlins on January 13, 2015. He was released on March 31 and re-signed the next day. He was recalled on April 21. Masset was designated for assignment on May 17 to make room for starting pitcher Henderson Alvarez, who was coming off the disabled list.

=== Atlanta Braves ===
On May 19, 2015, Masset signed a contract with the Atlanta Braves. He was designated for assignment along with Dana Eveland on July 5 to create room for David Carpenter whose contract was purchased and Arodys Vizcaino who was activated from the restricted list.

=== Washington Nationals ===
On December 14, 2015, Masset signed a minor league deal with the Washington Nationals. He announced his retirement on July 11, 2016.
