= 2007 Texas Rangers season =

2007 Texas Rangers
- League: American League
- Division: West
- Ballpark: Rangers Ballpark in Arlington
- City: Arlington, Texas
- Record: 75–87 (.463)
- Divisional place: 4th
- Owners: Tom Hicks
- General managers: Jon Daniels
- Managers: Ron Washington
- Television: FSN Southwest; KDFI (My27); KDFW (Fox 4)
- Radio: KRLD; KFLC (Spanish)

The 2007 Texas Rangers season was the 47th of the Texas Rangers franchise overall, their 36th in Arlington as the Rangers, and the 14th season at Rangers Ballpark in Arlington. The season began with the team trying to win an American League West title for the first time since 1999. The Rangers finished in last place in the AL West for the first time since 2003 with a 75–87 win-loss record, 19 games behind the Los Angeles Angels of Anaheim.

== Preseason ==
- Manager Buck Showalter was fired with three years remaining on his contract. The Rangers hired former Oakland Athletics third base coach Ron Washington to replace Showalter.
- OF Gary Matthews Jr., OF/INF Mark DeRosa, OF Carlos Lee, and RHP Adam Eaton signed with other clubs via free agency.
- OF Frank Catalanotto signed a multi-year contract,
- RHP Éric Gagné and center fielder Kenny Lofton each signed one-year contracts to close games and play center field, respectively.
- OF Sammy Sosa also signed a one-year contract with the team that drafted him in 1985, expected to be the Rangers' right fielder.

The team entered the season with only one spot in the pitching rotation to fill, with Jamey Wright beating out Kameron Loe and Bruce Chen (both of whom moved to bullpen roles). Two other new players won roster spots in spring training, C Chris Stewart and INF Matt Kata.

== Regular season ==
=== Opening Day starters ===
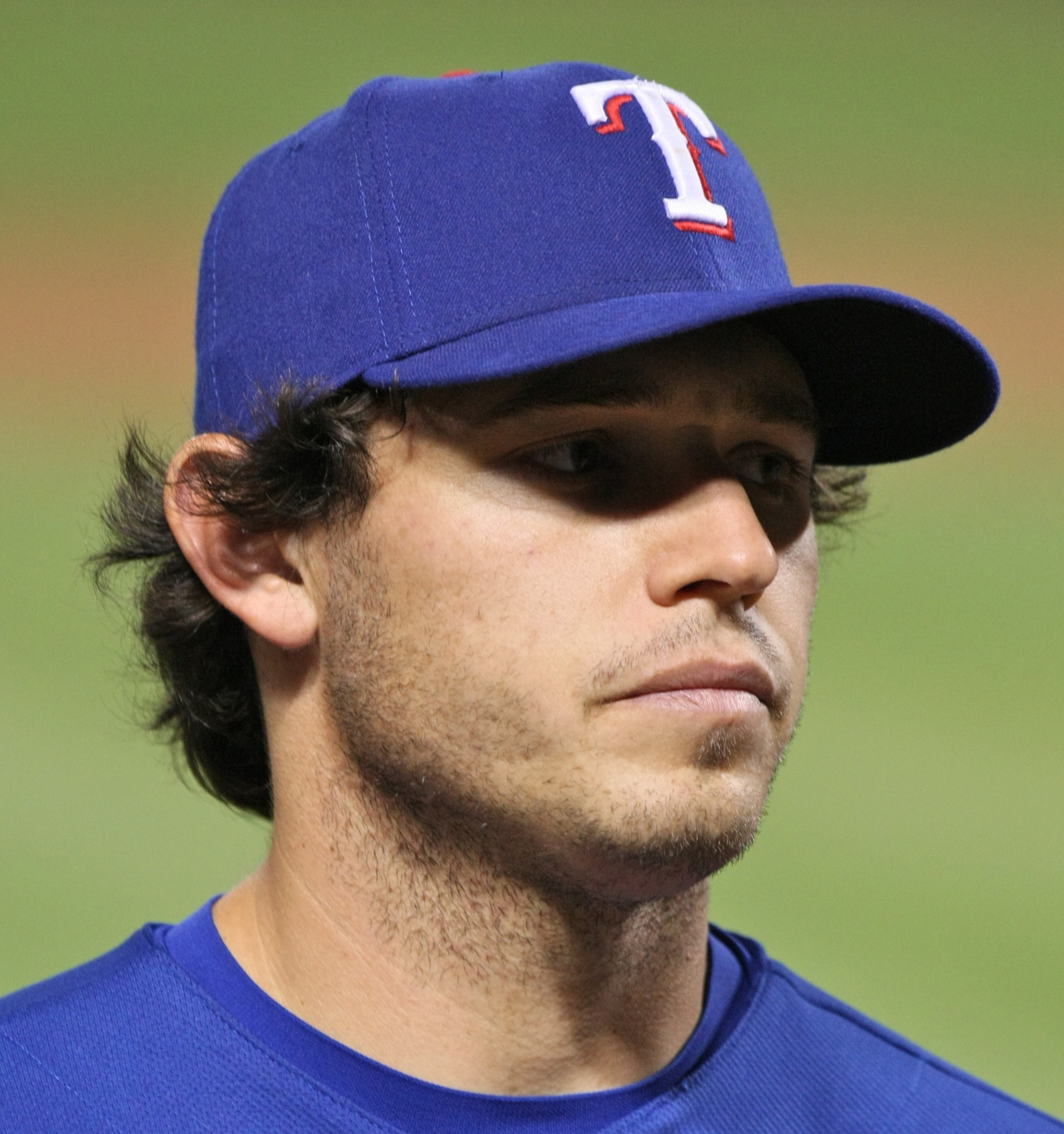
All Star Ian Kinsler

- Gerald Laird, C
- Mark Teixeira, 1B
- Ian Kinsler, 2B
- Hank Blalock, 3B
- Michael Young, SS
- Brad Wilkerson, LF
- Kenny Lofton, CF
- Sammy Sosa, RF
- Frank Catalanotto, DH
- Kevin Millwood, RHP

=== Season summary ===
==== April ====
April saw the club get to a slow start. Several of the club's offensive threats had poor starts, notably Michael Young and Mark Teixeira. One of the few players who was swinging the bat well was sophomore second baseman Ian Kinsler, who batted .298 and hit 9 home runs, earning him an American League Player of the Week award.

Another concern was the starting rotation. Jamey Wright was moved to the 15-day disabled list on April 12, and hasn't returned to the lineup. Vicente Padilla and newcomer Brandon McCarthy both had rough starts, ending April with 4-loss months.

The team's first home series, a two-game set against the Boston Red Sox on April 6 and 7 set records for the coldest home opener and the coldest game ever played at Rangers Ballpark in Arlington.

==== May ====
The month of May was one of the most dismal in the club's history. The Rangers ended the month with a 19–35 record, putting them on a pace for a 105-loss season, which would tie the franchise's previous mark for futility, set in 1973. The team's 20 losses set a record for the most ever in the month of May.

The starting rotation continued to have problems. Both Kevin Millwood and McCarthy spent time on the disabled list. Even when healthy, the starting pitching was suspect, as Rangers starters finished the month with the worst ERA in the Major Leagues.

The injury bug struck the position players as well; All-star third baseman Hank Blalock was moved to the 60-day disabled list after being diagnosed with thoracic outlet syndrome in his right shoulder, a condition that required surgery and a layoff of as much as three months. Outfielders Brad Wilkerson, Frank Catalanotto and Jerry Hairston Jr. also had long stints on the disabled list in May. At month's end, only second baseman Ian Kinsler was among the top three players at his position in All-Star balloting.

==== June ====
In stark contrast to May, June was the Rangers' first month of 2007 with a winning record (14–12). Several players had a strong month, most notably outfielder Marlon Byrd, who ended the month with a .375 batting average, and pitcher Kameron Loe, who used a brief stint in Triple-A to correct his pitching mechanics, resulting in a month-ending streak of three straight wins.

Veteran right fielder Sammy Sosa celebrated a career milestone on June 20, hitting his 600th home run in a game against his former team, the Chicago Cubs. Sosa became only the fifth player to reach the mark, following Babe Ruth, Willie Mays, Hank Aaron and Barry Bonds.

While several key players returned to active duty in June, including Wilkerson and Jamey Wright, injuries continued to plague the club. Gold Glove first baseman Mark Teixeira's franchise record for consecutive games played ended at 507 on June 8 when he strained a quadriceps muscle. Starting pitchers Vicente Padilla and Brandon McCarthy also spent time on the DL, for elbow inflammation and blisters, respectively.

==== July ====
Before the non-waiver trade deadline, the Rangers' front office headed by general manager Jon Daniels devised a plan to rebuild the Texas Rangers. This change signified a shift away from the practice of signing large numbers of free agents and instead focused on scouting, acquiring, and developing young talent that would be under club control for the first year of the players' careers. Franchise resources would from then on be redistributed with an emphasis on international scouting (particularly in the Far East and Latin America) and minor league development. The organization's stated purpose was to field a team that could legitimately compete for the A.L. Western Division by the 2010 season.

This project began in July 2007 with the trade of 1B Mark Teixeira to the Atlanta Braves. Teixeira netted the Rangers organization many young players, namely Jarrod Saltalamacchia. The Braves also sent over SS Elvis Andrus, RHP Neftalí Feliz, LHP Matt Harrison, and RHP Beau Jones.

The front office subsequently moved closer Éric Gagné to the Boston Red Sox in exchange for RHP Kason Gabbard and OF David Murphy.

==== August ====
On August 22, the Rangers scored an all-time American League record of 30 runs in one game against the Orioles. The final was 30–3. Texas' 30 runs broke the AL record and modern major-league record set by the 1950 Red Sox and tied by the 1955 White Sox, and were the most scored by any team since the Chicago Colts hung 36 runs on Louisville in a game in 1897.

August 22, 2007 5:05 pm (ET) at Oriole Park at Camden Yards in Baltimore, Maryland 74 °F (23 °C), Wind 7 mph in from Leftfield
Team	1	2	3	4	5	6	7	8	9	R	H	E
Texas	0	0	0	5	0	9	0	10	6	30	29	1
Baltimore	1	0	2	0	0	0	0	0	0	3	9	1
WP: Kason Gabbard (6–1) LP: Daniel Cabrera (9–13) Sv: Wes Littleton (1); Home runs: TEX: Ramon Vazquez (2), Jarrod Saltalamacchia (2), Marlon Byrd (1), Travis Metcalf (1); BAL: None; Attendance: 21,828; Notes: Game 1 of Doubleheader, American League record for most runs scored in one game. Boxscore

=== Season standings ===
AL West
Team	W	L	Pct.	GB	Home	Road
Los Angeles Angels of Anaheim	94	68	.580	—	54‍–‍27	40‍–‍41
Seattle Mariners	88	74	.543	6	49‍–‍33	39‍–‍41
Oakland Athletics	76	86	.469	18	40‍–‍41	36‍–‍45
Texas Rangers	75	87	.463	19	47‍–‍34	28‍–‍53

=== Record vs. opponents ===
2007 American League record Source: MLB Standings Grid – 2007
Team	BAL	BOS	CWS	CLE	DET	KC	LAA	MIN	NYY	OAK	SEA	TB	TEX	TOR	NL
Baltimore	—	6–12	5–3	3–4	1–5	7–0	3–7	0–7	9–9	4–4	2–7	11–7	4–6	8–10	6–12
Boston	12–6	—	7–1	5–2	3–4	3–3	6–4	4–3	8–10	4–4	4–5	13–5	6–4	9–9	12–6
Chicago	3–5	1–7	—	7–11	11–7	12–6	5–4	9–9	4–6	4–5	1–7	6–1	2–4	3–4	4–14
Cleveland	4–3	2–5	11–7	—	12–6	11–7	5–5	14–4	0–6	6–4	4–3	8–2	6–3	4–2	9–9
Detroit	5–1	4–3	7–11	6–12	—	11–7	3–5	12–6	4–4	4–6	6–4	3–4	5–4	4–3	14–4
Kansas City	0–7	3–3	6–12	7–11	7–11	—	5–2	9–9	1–9	6–4	3–6	4–3	5–4	3–4	10–8
Los Angeles	7–3	4–6	4–5	5–5	5–3	2–5	—	6–3	6–3	9–10	13–6	6–2	10–9	3–4	14–4
Minnesota	7–0	3–4	9–9	4–14	6–12	9–9	3–6	—	2–5	5–2	6–3	3–4	7–2	4–6	11–7
New York	9–9	10–8	6–4	6–0	4–4	9–1	3–6	5–2	—	2–4	5–5	10–8	5–1	10–8	10–8
Oakland	4–4	4–4	5–4	4–6	6–4	4–6	10–9	2–5	4–2	—	5–14	4–6	9–10	5–4	10–8
Seattle	7–2	5–4	7–1	3–4	4–6	6–3	6–13	3–6	5–5	14–5	—	4–3	11–8	4–5	9–9
Tampa Bay	7–11	5–13	1–6	2–8	4–3	3–4	2–6	4–3	8–10	6–4	3–4	—	5–4	9–9	7–11
Texas	6–4	4–6	4–2	3–6	4–5	4–5	9–10	2–7	1–5	10–9	8–11	4–5	—	5–5	11–7
Toronto	10–8	9–9	4–3	2–4	3–4	4–3	4–3	6–4	8–10	4–5	5–4	9–9	5–5	—	10–8

=== Roster ===
2007 Texas Rangers
Roster
Pitchers: 53 Joaquín Benoit; 46 Bruce Chen; 51 Willie Eyre; 39 Scott Feldman; 50 Frank Francisco; 13 Kason Gabbard; 38 Éric Gagné; 70 Armando Galarraga; 41 John Koronka; 58 Wes Littleton; 43 Kameron Loe; 32 Ron Mahay; 20 Brandon McCarthy; 32 Luis Mendoza; 33 Kevin Millwood; 47 A. J. Murray; 40 Akinori Otsuka; 44 Vicente Padilla; 48 John Rheinecker; 55 Robinson Tejeda; 31 Edinson Vólquez; 35 Bill White; 36 C. J. Wilson; 29 Mike Wood; 45 Jamey Wright	Catchers: 15 Gerald Laird; 2 Adam Melhuse; 16 Guillermo Quiróz; 35 Chris Stewart; Infielders: 9 Hank Blalock; 5 Ian Kinsler; 30 Travis Metcalf; 1 Desi Relaford; 16,25 Jarrod Saltalamacchia; 23 Mark Teixeira; 12 Ramón Vázquez; 10 Michael Young	Outfielders: 19 Jason Botts; 22 Marlon Byrd; 27 Frank Catalanotto; 17 Nelson Cruz; 14 Víctor Díaz; 4 Freddy Guzmán; 25,3,42 Jerry Hairston Jr.; 28 Matt Kata; 7,42 Kenny Lofton; 57 Kevin Mahar; 28 David Murphy; 21 Sammy Sosa; 6 Brad Wilkerson	Manager: 37 Ron Washington; Coaches: 56 Dom Chiti (bullpen); 52 Mark Connor (pitching); 11 Art Howe (bench); 8 Rudy Jaramillo (hitting); 24 Gary Pettis (first base); 18 Don Wakamatsu (third base)

=== Game log ===
2007 game log
April

#	Date	Opponent	Score	Win	Loss	Save	Attendance	Record
1	April 2	@ Angels	4 – 1	Lackey (1-0)	Millwood (0-1)	Rodríguez (1)	43,906	0-1
2	April 3	@ Angels	8 – 3	Escobar (1-0)	Padilla (0-1)		42,463	0-2
3	April 4	@ Angels	5 – 3	Santana (1-0)	McCarthy (0-1)	Rodríguez (2)	35,701	0-3
4	April 6	Red Sox	2 – 0	Tejeda (1-0)	Wakefield (0-1)	Otsuka (1)	51,548	1-3
5	April 7	Red Sox	8 – 4	Millwood (1-1)	Tavárez (0-1)		40,865	2-3
6	April 8	Red Sox	3 – 2	Schilling (1-1)	Padilla (0-2)	Papelbon (2)	28,347	2-4
7	April 9	Devil Rays	8 – 4	McCarthy (1-1)	Jackson (0-1)		21,547	3-4
8	April 10	Devil Rays	12 – 9	Feldman (1-0)	Seo (0-1)		23,897	4-4
9	April 11	Devil Rays	6 – 5	Shields (1-0)	Tejeda (1-1)		33,674	4-5
10	April 13	@ Mariners	5 – 2	Millwood (2-1)	Washburn (0-1)	Gagné (1)	25,243	5-5
11	April 14	@ Mariners	8 – 3	Batista (1-1)	Padilla (0-3)		25,954	5-6
12	April 15	@ Mariners	14 – 6	Ramírez (1-0)	McCarthy (1-2)		25,001	5-7
13	April 17	@ White Sox	8 – 1	Tejeda (2-1)	Garland (0-1)		23,139	6-7
14	April 18	@ White Sox	6 – 0	Buehrle (1-0)	Millwood (2-2)		25,390	6-8
15	April 19	@ White Sox	6 – 4	Thornton (1-1)	Feldman (1-1)	Jenks (4)	25,459	6-9
16	April 20	Athletics	16 – 4	Blanton (2-0)	McCarthy (1-3)		29,782	6-10
17	April 21	Athletics	7 – 0	Loe (1-0)	Kennedy (0-2)		42,945	7-10
18	April 22	Athletics	4 – 3	Eyre (1-0)	Duchscherer (1-1)	Otsuka (2)	37,002	8-10
19	April 23	Mariners	5 – 4	Morrow (1-0)	Millwood (2-3)	Putz (1)	26,592	8-11
--	April 24	Mariners	Postponed (rain) Rescheduled for July 25					8-11
20	April 25	@ Indians	8 – 7 (11)	Cabrera (1-0)	Eyre (1-1)		13,843	8-12
21	April 26	@ Indians	9 – 4	Byrd (2-1)	Loe (1-1)		14,066	8-13
22	April 27	@ Blue Jays	5 – 3	Tejeda (3-1)	Towers (1-3)	Otsuka (3)	24,795	9-13
23	April 28	@ Blue Jays	9 – 8 (10)	Otsuka (1-0)	Tallet (0-1)	Benoit (1)	24,119	10-13
24	April 29	@ Blue Jays	7 – 3	Ohka (2-2)	McCarthy (1-4)		27,516	10-14
25	April 30	@ Blue Jays	6 – 1	Halladay (4-0)	Padilla (0-4)		19,041	10-15

May

#	Date	Opponent	Score	Win	Loss	Save	Attendance	Record
26	May 1	Yankees	10 – 1	Hughes (1-1)	Loe (1-2)		32,310	10-16
--	May 2	Yankees	Postponed (rain) Rescheduled for May 3					10-16
27	May 3	Yankees	4 – 3	Vizcaíno (2-1)	Benoit (0-1)	Rivera (2)	n/a	10-17
28	May 3	Yankees	5 – 2	Mussina (1-1)	Tejeda (3-2)	Rivera (3)	40,671	10-18
29	May 4	Blue Jays	7 – 1	McCarthy (2-4)	Ohka (2-3)	Eyre (1)	24,342	11-18
30	May 5	Blue Jays	11 – 4	Padilla (1-4)	Halladay (4-1)		27,421	12-18
31	May 6	Blue Jays	3 – 2	Benoit (1-1)	Burnett (2-3)	Otsuka (4)	19,103	13-18
32	May 8	@ Yankees	8 – 2	Pettitte (2-1)	Wood (0-1)		50,705	13-19
33	May 9	@ Yankees	6 – 2	Mussina (2-1)	Tejeda (3-3)		47,930	13-20
34	May 10	@ Yankees	14 – 2	McCarthy (3-4)	Wang (1-3)		52,147	14-20
35	May 11	Angels	6 – 3	Lackey (5-3)	Padilla (1-5)	Shields (3)	30,782	14-21
36	May 12	Angels	6 – 3	Colón (4-0)	Loe (1-3)	Rodríguez (12)	36,474	14-22
37	May 13	Angels	7 – 6	Gagné (1-0)	Shields (0-2)		24,847	15-22
38	May 14	Angels	7 – 2	Weaver (2-3)	Millwood (2-4)		23,421	15-23
39	May 15	@ Devil Rays*	4 – 3 (10)	Stokes (2-5)	Feldman (1-2)		8,443	15-24
40	May 16	@ Devil Rays*	11 – 8	Fossum (3-3)	Padilla (1-6)	Reyes (12)	8,839	15-25
41	May 17	@ Devil Rays*	8 – 6 (10)	Glover (1-2)	Eyre (1-2)		9,635	15-26
42	May 18	@ Astros	7 – 4	Tejeda (4-3)	Albers (1-3)	Gagné (2)	37,634	16-26
43	May 19	@ Astros	6 – 1	Rodríguez (2-3)	Koronka (0-1)		41,990	16-27
44	May 20	@ Astros	14 – 1	McCarthy (4-4)	Williams (1-6)		39,938	17-27
45	May 21	Twins	14 – 4	Padilla (2-6)	Silva (2-5)		24,814	18-27
46	May 22	Twins	7 – 1	Santana (5-4)	Loe (1-4)		27,013	18-28
47	May 23	Twins	5 – 3	Bonser (3-1)	Tejeda (4-4)	Nathan (9)	24,370	18-29
48	May 25	Red Sox	10 – 6	Matsuzaka (7-2)	Littleton (0-1)		33,552	18-30
49	May 26	Red Sox	7 – 4	Wakefield (5-5)	Padilla (2-7)	Papelbon (12)	37,974	18-31
50	May 27	Red Sox	6 – 5	Piñeiro (1-0)	Otsuka (1-1)	Okajima (3)	40,323	18-32
51	May 28	@ Athletics	5 – 3	Gaudin (5-1)	Tejeda (4-5)	Embree (3)	18,230	18-33
52	May 29	@ Athletics	4 – 0	Wood (1-1)	DiNardo (1-2)	Gagné (3)	18,006	19-33
53	May 30	@ Athletics	6 – 1	Haren (6-2)	Koronka (0-2)		25,674	19-34
54	May 31	@ Mariners	9 – 5	Baek (3-2)	Padilla (2-8)		20,137	19-35
*At Walt Disney World in Orlando, Florida

June

#	Date	Opponent	Score	Win	Loss	Save	Attendance	Record
55	June 1	@ Mariners	9 – 8	Benoit (2-1)	Green (0-1)	Gagné (4)	34,570	20-35
56	June 2	@ Mariners	5 – 4	Batista (6-4)	Loe (1-5)	Putz (13)	41,988	20-36
57	June 3	@ Mariners	11 – 6	Feierabend (1-1)	Tejeda (4-6)		36,886	20-37
58	June 5	Tigers	7 – 4	Eyre (2-2)	Robertson (4-6)	Gagné (5)	32,003	21-37
59	June 6	Tigers	10 – 0	Verlander (6-2)	Millwood (2-5)		28,795	21-38
60	June 7	Tigers	11 – 4	Maroth (4-2)	Loe (1-6)		22,990	21-39
61	June 8	Brewers	9 – 6	Tejeda (5-6)	Capuano (5-5)	Gagné (6)	29,562	22-39
62	June 9	Brewers	4 – 3	Francisco (1-0)	Cordero (0-1)		37,882	23-39
63	June 10	Brewers	9 – 6 (12)	Villanueva (5-0)	Eyre (2-3)	Vargas (1)	24,129	23-40
64	June 12	@ Pirates	7 – 5	Duke (3-6)	Millwood (2-6)	Capps (3)	21,158	23-41
65	June 13	@ Pirates	8 – 1	Snell (6-4)	Tejeda (5-7)		16,110	23-42
66	June 14	@ Pirates	6 – 0	Loe (2-6)	Gorzelanny (6-4)		17,214	24-42
67	June 15	@ Reds	7 – 6	Padilla (3-8)	Belisle (5-5)	Gagné (7)	27,747	25-42
68	June 16	@ Reds	8 – 4	Harang (7-2)	Wright (0-1)		37,413	25-43
69	June 17	@ Reds	11 – 4	Millwood (3-6)	Arroyo (2-8)		31,162	26-43
70	June 19	Cubs	5 – 4	Mármol (2-0)	Benoit (2-2)		38,290	26-44
71	June 20	Cubs	7 – 3	Loe (3-6)	Marquis (5-4)		37,564	27-44
72	June 21	Cubs	6 – 5	Gagné (2-0)	Howry (3-4)		38,406	28-44
73	June 22	Astros	11 – 3	Millwood (4-6)	Williams (3-10)		37,847	29-44
74	June 23	Astros	7 – 2	Wright (1-1)	Oswalt (7-5)		42,315	30-44
75	June 24	Astros	12 – 9 (10)	Wheeler (1-4)	Wilson (0-1)	Qualls (2)	31,560	30-45
76	June 25	@ Tigers	8 – 3	Loe (4-6)	Bonderman (8-1)		36,330	31-45
77	June 26	@ Tigers	9 – 6	Otsuka (2-1)	Jones (1-4)	Gagné (8)	39,709	32-45
--	June 27	@ Tigers	Postponed (rain) Rescheduled for September 11					32-45
78	June 28	@ Tigers	5 – 2	Rogers (2-0)	Millwood (4-7)	Jones (19)	37,253	32-46
79	June 29	@ Red Sox	2 – 1	Wakefield (8-8)	Wright (1-2)	Papelbon (19)	36,756	32-47
80	June 30	@ Red Sox	5 – 4	Mahay (1-0)	Beckett (11-2)	Gagné (9)	36,747	33-47

July

#	Date	Opponent	Score	Win	Loss	Save	Attendance	Record
81	July 1	@ Red Sox	2 – 1	Loe (5-6)	Tavárez (5-6)	Gagné (10)	36,378	34-47
82	July 2	@ Red Sox	7 – 3	Gabbard (2-0)	McCarthy (4-5)		36,778	34-48
83	July 3	Angels	8 – 3	Millwood (5-7)	Santana (5-9)		24,871	35-48
84	July 4	Angels	4 – 2	Wright (2-2)	Weaver (6-5)	Gagné (11)	46,105	36-48
85	July 5	Angels	5 – 2	Escobar (10-3)	Tejeda (5-8)		22,062	36-49
86	July 6	Orioles	4 – 3 (10)	Benoit (3-2)	Shuey (0-1)		24,035	37-49
87	July 7	Orioles	3 – 0	Bédard (7-4)	McCarthy (4-6)		32,849	37-50
88	July 8	Orioles	2 – 1	Millwood (6-7)	Cabrera (6-10)	Gagné (12)	22,843	38-50
89	July 13	@ Angels	2 – 1	Rodríguez (3-2)	Benoit (3-3)		44,100	38-51
90	July 14	@ Angels	9 – 5	Lackey (12-5)	Loe (5-7)		44,026	38-52
91	July 15	@ Angels	5 – 4 (11)	Wilson (1-1)	Speier (0-1)	Gagné (13)	44,068	39-52
92	July 16	@ Athletics	4 – 1	Wright (3-2)	Braden (1-4)	Gagné (14)	18,160	40-52
93	July 17	@ Athletics	11 – 4	Eyre (3-3)	Gaudin (8-5)	Mahay (1)	20,209	41-52
94	July 18	@ Athletics	6 – 0	DiNardo (4-6)	Millwood (6-8)		23,440	41-53
95	July 19	Indians	7 – 5	Sabathia (13-4)	Loe (5-8)	Borowski (27)	28,108	41-54
96	July 20	Indians	3 – 2	Carmona (12-4)	McCarthy (4-7)	Borowski (28)	32,103	41-55
97	July 21	Indians	8 – 5	Mahay (2-0)	Lee (5-7)		44,554	42-55
98	July 22	Indians	8 – 3	Byrd (8-4)	Tejeda (5-9)		27,227	42-56
99	July 23	Mariners	8 – 7	Millwood (7-8)	Ramírez (5-3)		20,584	43-56
100	July 24	Mariners	2 – 1	Rheinecker (1-0)	Feierabend (1-4)	Gagné (15)	n/a	44-56
101	July 24	Mariners	4 – 3	Wilson (2-1)	Reitsma (0-2)	Gagné (16)	26,842	45-56
102	July 25	Mariners	7 – 6	Benoit (4-3)	Putz (1-1)		34,853	46-56
103	July 27	@ Royals	6 – 1	Bannister (7-6)	Wright (3-3)		21,730	46-57
104	July 28	@ Royals	6 – 5	Pérez (6-9)	Millwood (7-9)	Dotel (11)	27,700	46-58
105	July 29	@ Royals	10 – 0	Núñez (1-0)	Loe (5-9)	Peralta (1)	15,638	46-59
106	July 31	@ Indians	3 – 1	McCarthy (5-7)	Carmona (13-5)	Wilson (1)	21,811	47-59

August

#	Date	Opponent	Score	Win	Loss	Save	Attendance	Record
107	August 1	@ Indians	9 – 6 (10)	Benoit (5-3)	Lewis (0-1)	Wilson (2)	25,721	48-59
108	August 2	@ Indians	5 – 0	Westbrook (2-6)	Gabbard (4-1)		27,520	48-60
109	August 3	@ Blue Jays	6 – 4	Halladay (12-5)	Wright (3-4)	Accardo (19)	23,777	48-61
110	August 4	@ Blue Jays	9 – 5	Marcum (8-4)	Eyre (3-4)		25,321	48-62
111	August 5	@ Blue Jays	4 – 1	McGowan (8-5)	McCarthy (5-8)	Accardo (20)	29,593	48-63
112	August 6	Athletics	9 – 7 (13)	Brown (2-0)	Eyre (3-5)	Calero (1)	24,737	48-64
113	August 7	Athletics	8 – 6	Gabbard (5-1)	Gaudin (8-8)	Wilson (3)	25,122	49-64
114	August 8	Athletics	6 – 3	DiNardo (6-6)	Murray (0-1)	Embree (14)	29,647	49-65
115	August 10	Devil Rays	7 – 4	Wood (2-1)	Sonnanstine (1-8)	Wilson (4)	28,314	50-65
116	August 11	Devil Rays	3 – 0	Jackson (3-11)	Rheinecker (1-1)		36,709	50-66
117	August 12	Devil Rays	9 – 1	Eyre (4-5)	Hammel (1-2)		24,042	51-66
118	August 14	Royals	5 – 3	Millwood (8-9)	Davies (1-1)	Wilson (5)	23,906	52-66
119	August 15	Royals	4 – 3	Wood (3-1)	Meche (7-11)	Wilson (6)	24,529	53-66
120	August 16	Royals	6 – 2	Braun (1-0)	Eyre (4-6)		22,674	53-67
121	August 17	@ Twins	2 – 1 (10)	Guerrier (2-4)	Wright (3-5)		30,924	53-68
122	August 18	@ Twins	5 – 0	Loe (6-9)	Bonser (5-10)		41,037	54-68
123	August 19	@ Twins	1 – 0	Santana (13-9)	Millwood (8-10)	Nathan (27)	36,353	54-69
--	August 20	@ Orioles	Postponed (rain) Rescheduled for August 22					54-69
124	August 21	@ Orioles	6 – 2	Bédard (13-4)	Padilla (3-9)		18,926	54-70
125	August 22	@ Orioles	30 – 3	Gabbard (6-1)	Cabrera (9-13)	Littleton (1)	21,828	55-70
126	August 22	@ Orioles	9 – 7	Benoit (6-3)	Hoey (1-1)	Wilson (7)	21,828	56-70
127	August 23	Mariners	9 – 4	Weaver (6-10)	Loe (6-10)		26,963	56-71
128	August 24	Mariners	4 – 2	Hernández (10-6)	Millwood (8-11)	Putz (37)	32,716	56-72
129	August 25	Mariners	5 – 3	Benoit (7-3)	White (1-1)	Wilson (8)	47,977	57-72
130	August 26	Mariners	5 – 3	Padilla (4-9)	Washburn (9-11)		25,437	58-72
131	August 28	White Sox	4 – 3	Littleton (1-1)	MacDougal (1-4)	Benoit (2)	20,261	59-72
132	August 29	White Sox	5 – 4 (11)	Littleton (2-1)	Logan (2-1)		23,704	60-72
133	August 30	White Sox	5 – 1	Millwood (9-11)	Danks (6-13)		23,432	61-72
134	August 31	@ Angels	7 – 6 (10)	Oliver (2-0)	Francisco (1-1)		41,012	61-73

September

#	Date	Opponent	Score	Win	Loss	Save	Attendance	Record
135	September 1	@ Angels	7 – 6	Vólquez (1-0)	Escobar (15-7)	Wilson (9)	38,342	62-73
136	September 2	@ Angels	8 – 7	Littleton (3-1)	Shields (3-5)	Wilson (10)	40,635	63-73
137	September 3	Royals	8 – 1	Greinke (6-5)	Loe (6-11)		19,214	63-74
138	September 4	Royals	9 – 8	Rheinecker (2-1)	Núñez (2-3)	Wilson (11)	18,892	64-74
139	September 5	Royals	3 – 2	Padilla (5-9)	Davies (6-12)	Benoit (3)	17,232	65-74
140	September 7	Athletics	5 – 3	Vólquez (2-0)	Haren (14-7)	Benoit (4)	22,318	66-74
141	September 8	Athletics	7 – 3	Murray (1-1)	Gaudin (11-10)		32,476	67-74
142	September 9	Athletics	12 – 9	White (1-0)	DiNardo (8-9)		25,054	68-74
143	September 11	@ Tigers	13 – 6	Padilla (6-9)	Durbin (8-7)		32,719	69-74
144	September 11	@ Tigers	4 – 1	Jurrjens (2-1)	McCarthy (5-9)	Jones (34)	33,840	69-75
145	September 12	@ Tigers	5 – 1	Verlander (17-5)	Vólquez (2-1)		32,490	69-76
146	September 13	@ Athletics	6 – 5	Gaudin (11-11)	Millwood (9-12)	Street (15)	16,240	69-77
147	September 14	@ Athletics	11 – 9	Brown (3-2)	Rheinecker (2-2)	Street (16)	19,346	69-78
148	September 15	@ Athletics	7 – 3	Blanton (14-9)	McCarthy (5-10)	Embree (17)	24,517	69-79
149	September 16	@ Athletics	11 – 9	Rheinecker (3-2)	Brown (3-3)	Benoit (5)	23,770	70-79
150	September 17	@ Twins	5 – 4	Nathan (4-2)	Benoit (7-4)		14,197	70-80
151	September 18	@ Twins	4 – 2	Silva (12-14)	Millwood (9-13)	Nathan (33)	18,226	70-81
152	September 19	@ Twins	4 – 2	Garza (4-6)	Padilla (6-10)	Nathan (34)	17,842	70-82
153	September 20	Orioles	6 – 3	Walker (2-2)	Rheinecker (3-3)		20,136	70-83
154	September 21	Orioles	3 – 2	Mendoza (1-0)	Santos (1-6)	Benoit (6)	30,603	71-83
155	September 22	Orioles	11 – 9	Hoey (2-4)	Littleton (3-2)	Walker (6)	40,148	71-84
156	September 23	Orioles	3 – 0	Millwood (10-13)	Leicester (2-3)	Wilson (12)	37,812	72-84
157	September 24	Angels	8 – 7	White (2-0)	Santana (7-14)	Littleton (2)	22,881	73-84
158	September 25	Angels	3 – 1	Wright (4-5)	Oliver (3-1)		30,708	74-84
159	September 26	Angels	16 – 2	Rheinecker (4-3)	Saunders (8-4)		24,223	75-84
160	September 28	@ Mariners	6 – 4	Putz (6-1)	Wood (3-2)		31,954	75-85
161	September 29	@ Mariners	5 – 1	Batista (16-11)	Millwood (10-14)		26,799	75-86
162	September 30	@ Mariners	4 – 2	Hernández (14-7)	Murray (1-2)	Putz (40)	30,442	75-87

Source: ESPN

== Player stats ==
=== Batting ===
==== Starters by position ====
Note: G = Games played; AB = At bats; H = Hits; Avg. = Batting average; HR = Home runs; RBI = Runs batted in

Pos	Player	G	AB	H	Avg.	HR	RBI
C	Gerald Laird	120	407	91	.224	9	47
1B	Mark Teixeira	78	286	85	.297	13	49
2B	Ian Kinsler	130	483	127	.263	20	61
SS	Michael Young	156	639	201	.315	9	94
3B	Ramón Vázquez	104	300	69	.230	8	28
LF	Frank Catalanotto	103	331	86	.260	11	44
CF	Kenny Lofton	84	317	96	.303	7	23
RF	Nelson Cruz	96	307	72	.235	9	34
DH	Sammy Sosa	114	412	104	.252	21	92

==== Other batters ====
Note: G = Games played; AB = At bats; H = Hits; Avg. = Batting average; HR = Home runs; RBI = Runs batted in

Player	G	AB	H	Avg.	HR	RBI
Marlon Byrd	109	414	127	.307	10	70
Brad Wilkerson	119	338	79	.234	20	62
Hank Blalock	58	208	61	.293	10	33
Jason Botts	48	167	40	.240	2	14
Jarrod Saltalamacchia	46	167	42	.251	7	21
Travis Metcalf	57	161	41	.255	5	21
Jerry Hairston Jr.	73	159	30	.189	3	16
Víctor Díaz	37	104	25	.240	9	25
David Murphy	43	103	35	.340	2	14
Matt Kata	31	70	13	.186	2	6
Adam Melhuse	23	68	14	.206	1	7
Chris Stewart	17	37	9	.243	0	3
Desi Relaford	14	26	3	.115	0	0
Kevin Mahar	7	18	3	.167	0	1
Guillermo Quiroz	9	10	4	.400	0	2
Freddy Guzmán	8	6	1	.167	1	1

=== Pitching ===
==== Starting pitchers ====
Note: G = Games pitched; IP = Innings pitched; W = Wins; L = Losses; ERA = Earned run average; SO = Strikeouts

Player	G	IP	W	L	ERA	SO
Kevin Millwood	31	172.2	10	14	5.16	123
Kameron Loe	28	136.0	6	11	5.36	78
Vicente Padilla	23	120.1	6	10	5.76	71
Brandon McCarthy	23	101.2	5	10	4.87	59
Rob Tejeda	19	95.1	5	9	6.61	69
Kason Gabbard	8	40.1	2	1	5.58	26
Edinson Vólquez	6	34.0	2	1	4.50	29
John Koronka	2	10.1	0	2	7.84	2

==== Other pitchers ====
Note: G = Games pitched; IP = Innings pitched; W = Wins; L = Losses; ERA = Earned run average; SO = Strikeouts

Player	G	IP	W	L	ERA	SO
Jamey Wright	20	77.0	4	5	3.62	39
Mike Wood	21	50.2	3	2	5.33	25
John Rheinecker	23	50.1	4	3	5.36	40
A.J. Murray	14	28.0	1	2	4.50	18
Luis Mendoza	6	16.0	1	0	2.25	7
Armando Galarraga	3	8.2	0	0	6.23	6

===== Relief pitchers =====
Note: G = Games pitched; W = Wins; L = Losses; SV = Saves; ERA = Earned run average; SO = Strikeouts

Player	G	W	L	SV	ERA	SO
Éric Gagné	34	2	0	16	2.16	29
Joaquin Benoit	70	7	4	6	2.85	87
C.J. Wilson	66	2	1	12	3.03	63
Frank Francisco	59	1	1	0	4.55	49
Wes Littleton	35	3	2	2	4.31	24
Akinori Otsuka	34	2	1	4	2.51	23
Willie Eyre	33	4	6	1	5.16	42
Scott Feldman	29	1	2	0	5.77	19
Ron Mahay	28	2	0	1	2.77	32
Bill White	9	2	0	0	4.82	9
Bruce Chen	5	0	0	0	7.20	7

== Farm system ==
Level	Team	League	Manager
AAA	Oklahoma RedHawks	Pacific Coast League	Bobby Jones
AA	Frisco RoughRiders	Texas League	Dave Anderson
A	Bakersfield Blaze	California League	Carlos Subero
A	Clinton LumberKings	Midwest League	Mike Micucci
A-Short Season	Spokane Indians	Northwest League	Tim Hulett
Rookie	AZL Rangers	Arizona League	Pedro López
