= Cason (disambiguation) =

Cason was a Panamanian cargo ship.

Cason may also refer to:

== People ==
=== Given name ===
- Cason Campbell (born c. 2007), American professional pickleball player
- Cason Crane (born 1992), American entrepreneur and endurance athlete
- Cason Wallace (born 2003), American basketball player

=== Surname ===
- Cason (surname)

== Other uses ==
- Cason, Texas, an unincorporated community in Morris County, Texas, U.S.
- Cason Shale, a geologic formation in Arkansas, U.S.

== See also ==
- Caisson (disambiguation)
- Cayson Mound and Village Site, an archaeological site located in Florida, U.S.
- Kason (disambiguation)
