= Kason (disambiguation) =

Kason is the second month of the traditional Burmese calendar.

Kason may also refer to:

- Kason Gabbard (born 1982), American baseball coach and former pitcher
- Kason Sugioka (1913–2012), Japanese calligrapher, pedagogue and recipient of the Order of Culture

== See also ==
- Cason (disambiguation)
- Cayson Mound and Village Site, an archaeological site located in Florida, U.S.
- Jason (disambiguation)
- Kazon, a fictional alien race in Star Trek
