= Matt Kata =

American baseball player (born 1978)

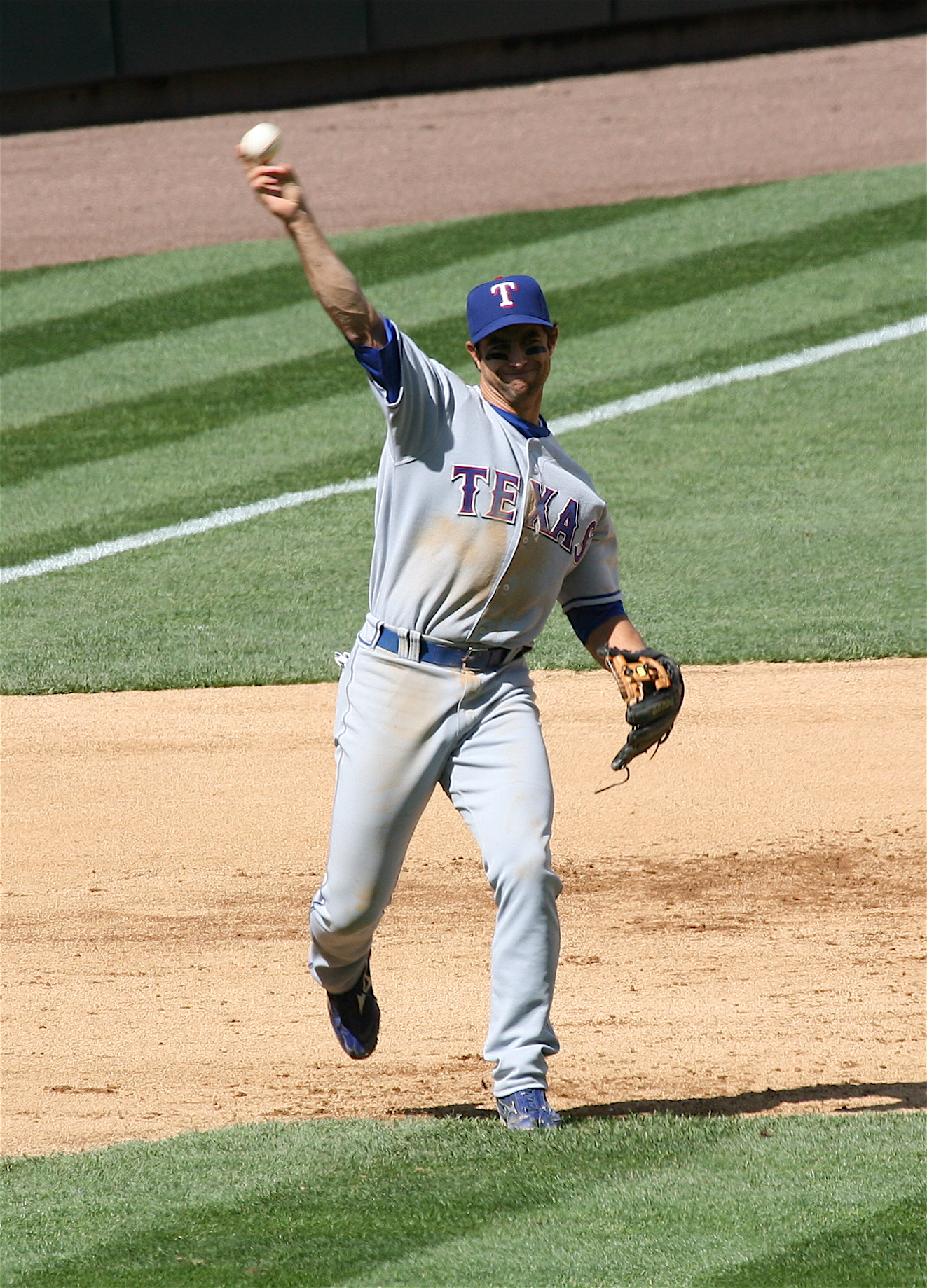
- Kata playing for the Texas Rangers in 2007
- Utility player
- Born: March 14, 1978 (age 48); Fairview Park, Ohio, U.S.
- Batted: Switch Threw: Right

MLB debut
- June 15, 2003, for the Arizona Diamondbacks

Last MLB appearance
- August 11, 2009, for the Houston Astros

MLB statistics
- Batting average: .239
- Home runs: 12
- Runs batted in: 63
- Stats at Baseball Reference

Teams
- Arizona Diamondbacks (2003–2005); Philadelphia Phillies (2005); Texas Rangers (2007); Pittsburgh Pirates (2007); Houston Astros (2009)

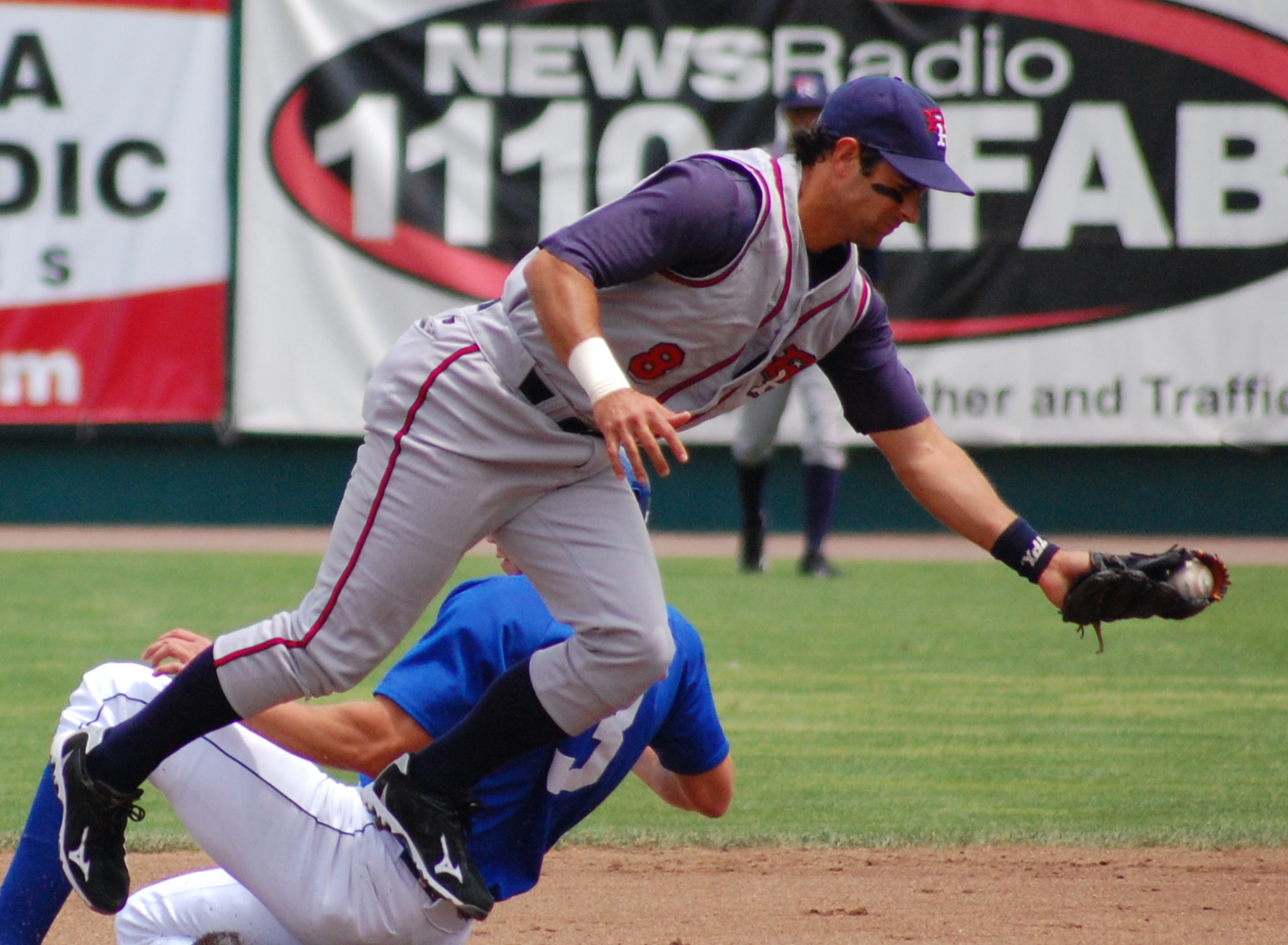
Kata playing for the Round Rock Express, triple-A affiliates of the Houston Astros, in 2010

Matthew John Kata (born March 14, 1978) is an American former professional baseball infielder. He played in Major League Baseball (MLB) for the Arizona Diamondbacks, Philadelphia Phillies, Texas Rangers, Pittsburgh Pirates, and Houston Astros.

== Career ==
Kata graduated from St. Ignatius High School in Cleveland, Ohio in 1996 and attended college at Vanderbilt University. In 1997 and 1998, he played collegiate summer baseball with the Chatham A's of the Cape Cod Baseball League. He was selected by Arizona in the ninth round of the 1999 Major League Baseball draft and made his major league debut for the Diamondbacks June 15, 2003. He also played briefly for the Philadelphia Phillies in 2005, and Texas Rangers in 2007.

Along with Robby Hammock, Alex Cintrón and Brandon Webb, he was one of the "Baby Backs" who were called up when a surge of injuries hit Diamondbacks veteran players in 2003. The Baby Backs were popular and contributed to a winning season, but ultimately failed to make the playoffs.

Kata was signed to a minor league contract by the Texas Rangers in November 2006 and was a non-roster invitee to their 2007 spring training camp. He earned a spot on the team's opening day roster as a utility player. He appeared in 31 games for Texas, batting .186, before he was designated for assignment June 5 when the Rangers activated pitcher John Rheinecker and infielder/outfielder Jerry Hairston Jr. from the disabled list. After clearing waivers, he signed a minor league contract with Pittsburgh on June 15 and was recalled by the Pirates June 30. Kata became a free agent after the season.

On December 21, 2007, the Colorado Rockies signed Kata to a minor league contract with an invitation to spring training. Kata did not make the team and opted for free agency.

On March 30, 2008, Kata rejoined the Pittsburgh Pirates organization by signing a minor league contract. He became a free agent at the end of the season and signed a minor league contract with the Houston Astros, and appeared in 40 games for the Astros in 2009; he spent the entire 2010 season with their Triple–A affiliate, the Round Rock Express.

Kata signed a minor-league contract with the Texas Rangers on January 13, 2011. He played for their Pacific Coast League affiliate, which was also Round Rock, as the Express became the Rangers' Triple–A club prior to the 2011 season.
