= Caisse =

Caisse, a French word, may refer to:

- Caisse Desjardins, an association of credit unions in Quebec
- Caisse d'Epargne-Illes Balears, a road-bicycle racing team
- Caisse des dépôts et consignations, a French publicly-owned investment corporation
- Caisse nationale suisse d'assurance en cas d'accidents, a Swiss insurer
- Caisse de Stabilisation des Prix du Coton, a Chadian government agency
- La Caisse, a public pension fund in Quebec
- Mouvement des caisses populaires acadiennes, a credit union in the Canadian province of New Brunswick

== See also ==
- Caïssa, a neoclassical goddess of chess
- Kaissa, a chess program developed in the Soviet Union in the 1960s
- Kaïssa, a Cameroon born world musician.
- Caisson (disambiguation)
