= Sugioka =

Sugioka (written: 杉岡) is a Japanese surname. Notable people with the surname include:

- Daiki Sugioka (杉岡 大暉, born 1998), Japanese footballer
- Kason Sugioka (杉岡 華邨, 1913–2012), Japanese calligrapher and pedagogue
- Kuniyoshi Sugioka (杉岡 邦由, born 1942), Japanese high jumper
