= Caisson =

Caisson (French for "box") may refer to:

- Caisson (engineering), a sealed underwater structure
- Caisson (vehicle), a two-wheeled cart for carrying ammunition, also used in certain state and military funerals
- Caisson (Asian architecture), a spider web ceiling
- Caisson (lock gate), a gate for a dock or lock, constructed as a floating caisson
- Caisson (pen name), of Edward Sperling (1889–1946)
- Caisson (western architecture), a type of coffer
- Caisson disease, or decompression sickness
- Caisson lock, a type of canal lock
- "The Caisson Song" (1908), an American military song by Edmund L. Gruber (1879–1941) later adapted by John Philip Sousa

== See also ==
- Caisson foundation
- Kason (disambiguation)
- Kazon, a fictional alien race in Star Trek
- Khe Sanh
