= Bill White (pitcher) =

American baseball player (born 1978)

- Pitcher
- Born: November 20, 1978 (age 47); Louisville, Kentucky, U.S.
- Batted: Left Threw: Left

MLB debut
- September 5, 2007, for the Texas Rangers

Last MLB appearance
- September 26, 2008, for the Texas Rangers

MLB statistics
- Win–loss record: 2–0
- Earned run average: 9.45
- Strikeouts: 10
- Stats at Baseball Reference

Teams
- Texas Rangers (2007–2008)

William Cowart White (born November 20, 1978) is an American former professional baseball pitcher. He played in Major League Baseball (MLB) for the Texas Rangers.

== Career ==
White made his Major League Baseball debut with the Texas Rangers in 2007. White's contract was purchased by the Rangers from Oklahoma on August 25, 2007. He was outrighted to the minors on October 1, 2008, after posting a 9.45 ERA during the season.

In January 2009, he signed a minor league contract with the Chicago Cubs. However, on February 20, 2009, he was released after failing a physical. On December 18, 2009, White signed a minor league contract with the Philadelphia Phillies.

On April 9, 2010, White signed with the Long Island Ducks of the Atlantic League of Professional Baseball.
