= Cason =

Cargo ship that burned in 1987

Coordinates: 42.45°N 9.35°W

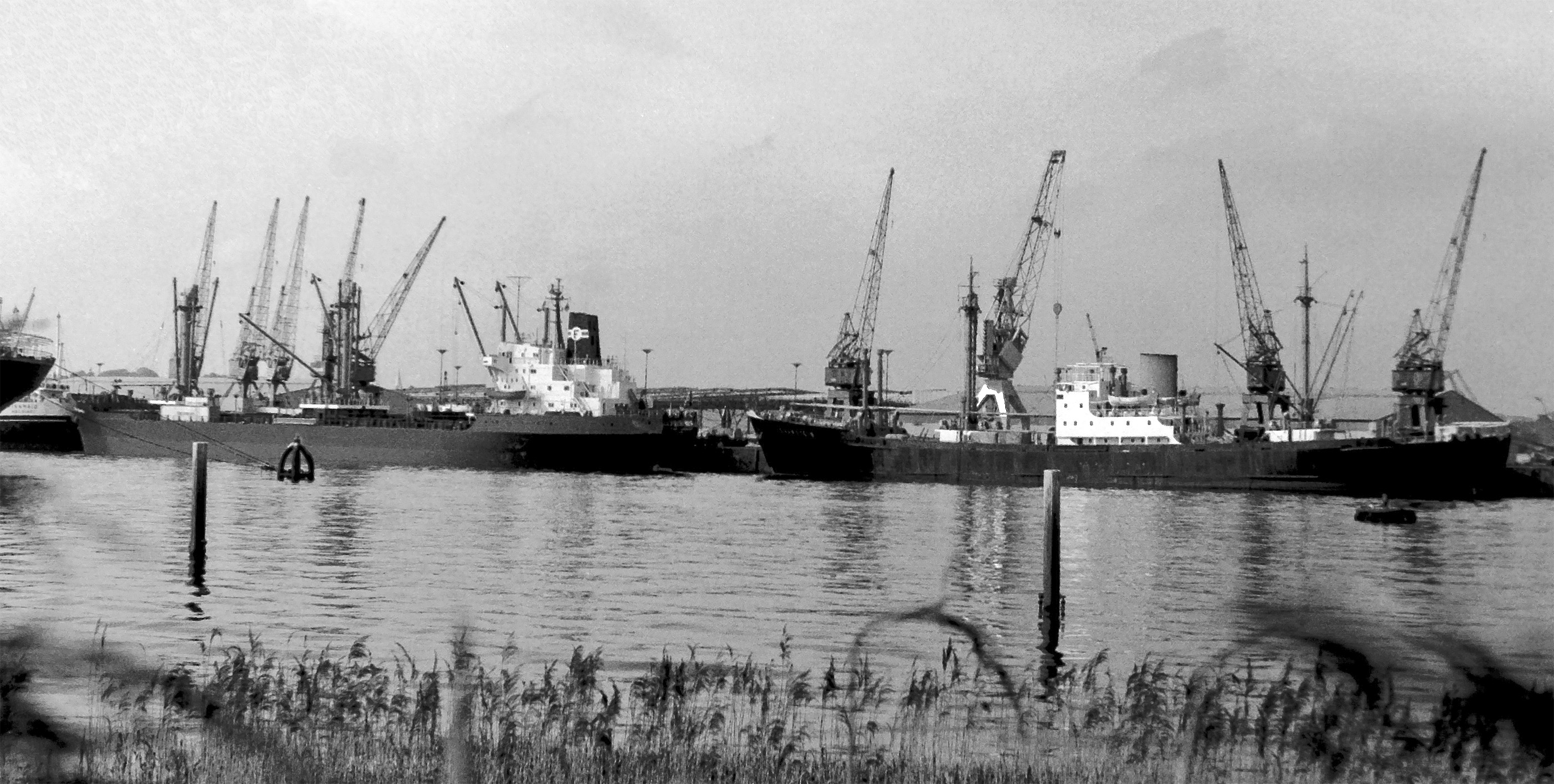

History
- Name: Finn-Leonhardt
- Builder: Flensburger Schiffbau-Gesellschaft, Flensburg, Germany
- Launched: 21 February 1969
- Completed: 1969
- Identification: IMO number: 6916976

History

Panama
- Name: Cason
- Route: Antwerp - Shanghai
- Acquired: 1978
- Identification: IMO number: 6916976
- Fate: lost: grounded and broke up

General characteristics
- Type: Cargo ship
- Tonnage: 9,191 GRT; 15,250 DWT
- Length: 136.84 metres (449.0 ft)
- Beam: 21.06 metres (69.1 ft)
- Crew: 31

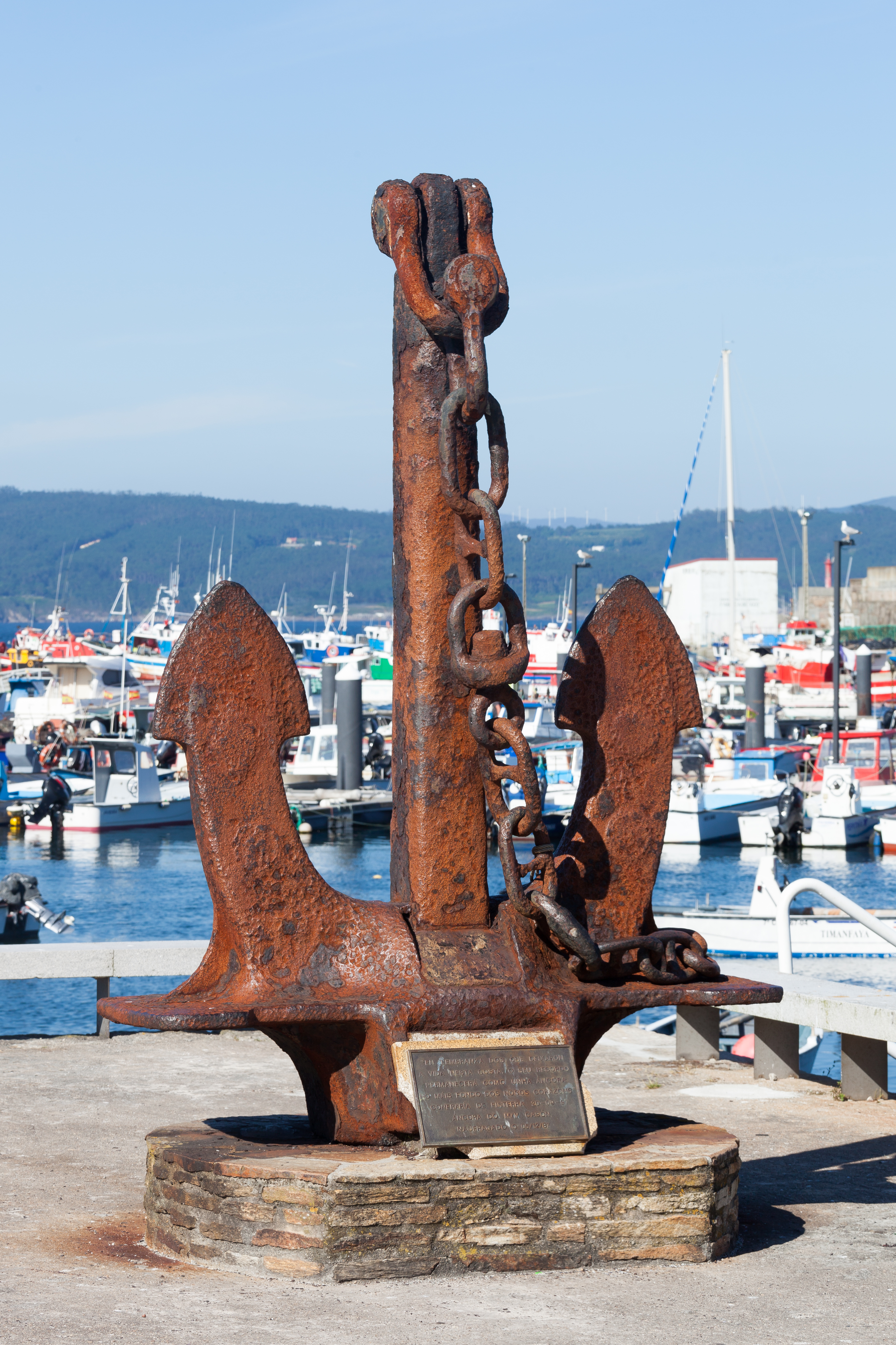
Anchor from Cason, preserved as a memorial at Fisterra

Cason (until 1978 Finn-Leonhardt) was a cargo ship, under a Panamanian flag, carrying 1,100 tonnes of various toxic and flammable chemicals. On 5 December 1987 the ship caught fire off the coast of Galicia, Spain. 23 of the 31 crew died, including the captain. The ship grounded off Cape Finisterre and broke up.

== Fire and wreck ==
Cason was en route from Rotterdam to Shanghai with a cargo of various chemicals loaded at Hamburg, Rotterdam and Antwerp. The ship was owned by a Hong Kong company and registered in Panama. Of the 31 crew, the captain and chief engineer were from Hong Kong and the remainder Chinese. Shortly before dawn on 5 December 1987 an explosion occurred 23 miles off the Spanish coast at Cape Finisterre, setting the ship on fire. The captain broadcast an SOS about an hour later, and those crew not caught by the flames jumped into the sea to escape. All but eight died, including the captain and one woman. The ship grounded on rocks 150 metres (450 feet) offshore, still burning, and broke up.

Initial reports were that the deaths were mainly from drowning and hypothermia; the local hospital later reported that one drowned but the remainder died of carbon monoxide poisoning. Survivors said that the lifeboat mechanism failed to work, as a result of which many crew members jumped into the water wearing lifejackets. The initial explosion was said to have been caused by the cargo shifting in heavy seas.

== Rescue operation and aftermath ==
The Finisterre Red Cross launch and helicopters from the local air rescue service, the Spanish Navy, and Madrid were all involved in recovering bodies and searching for survivors. In addition British, Italian, and Danish ships rescued some survivors. One crew member who remained missing until the search was suspended at nightfall was found dead the next day. The weather remained stormy, complicating efforts to tow the ship; in the evening it ran aground on Punta do Rostro, an offshore shoal. The bottom of the ship was holed such that it was not feasible to refloat it. Because of the presumed risk of further explosion, tugboats and cranes were then ordered to remain clear. After it was determined that the cargo included flammable gas, flammable liquids, and a poison, three tugboats and two specialised cranes on floating platforms were assembled to attempt recovery and precise identification of the cargo. Cargo recovery began on the afternoon of 9 December, with drums of ortho-cresol and formaldehyde, but the weather became stormy again, stopping the work and causing more drums containing sodium to break and catch fire, some of them after being washed overboard. No evacuation of residents of the coastal area was initially ordered, but hundreds left, especially after the weather worsened, and after further explosions in the hold beginning on 10 December caused a toxic cloud, thousands fled and school buses were provided as transportation. Ultimately 15,000 or 20,000 people evacuated.

The cargo included approximately 5,000 barrels, other containers, and bags containing flammable substances (xylene, butanol, butyl acrylate, cyclohexanone, and sodium—contact of the sodium with water was the cause of the fire), toxins (aniline oil, diphenylmethane di-isocyanate, o-cresol, and dibutyl phthalate), and corrosives (phosphoric acid and phthalic anhydride). The flammable liquids comprised at least 2,000 barrels stored in four of the five hold compartments. The nature of the cargo was initially unclear, but the Spanish newspaper El País identified it as "several tons of a sodium compound, 110 tons of aniline oil, 6 tons of ethanol (grain alcohol) and 10 tons of an flammable liquid of Grade 9 (maximum) danger", and the governor of A Coruña, Andres Moreno Aguilar, confirmed the list as accurate. There were rumours of nuclear material. Recovery of the dangerous substances that had not been swept into the sea by waves was completed on 12 December, after a deck was removed to access the deep tank where the aniline was stored. There were three injuries and one case of mild aniline poisoning among the salvage workers. A large portion of the cargo was not recovered; what was, was taken to the Alúmina-Aluminio plant in San Cibrao, causing alarm among the workers.

It was the worst sea disaster in the region since the Norwegian tanker MV Polycommander ran aground near Vigo in 1970, also killing 23 crew members, and was studied in 2014 by the Polytechnic University of Catalonia as one of the worst chemical disasters of the 20th century in Spain.

The accident demonstrated the need for adequate packing of sodium when being shipped, and also the inadvisability of using trade names for chemicals, which led to confusion.

An anchor from Cason has been preserved on the quay at Fisterra with a memorial plaque.

== Further information ==
- A Caixa Negra: O Cason (documentary film) (in Galician). Televisión de Galicia. 2009.
