= Willie Eyre =

American baseball player (born 1978)

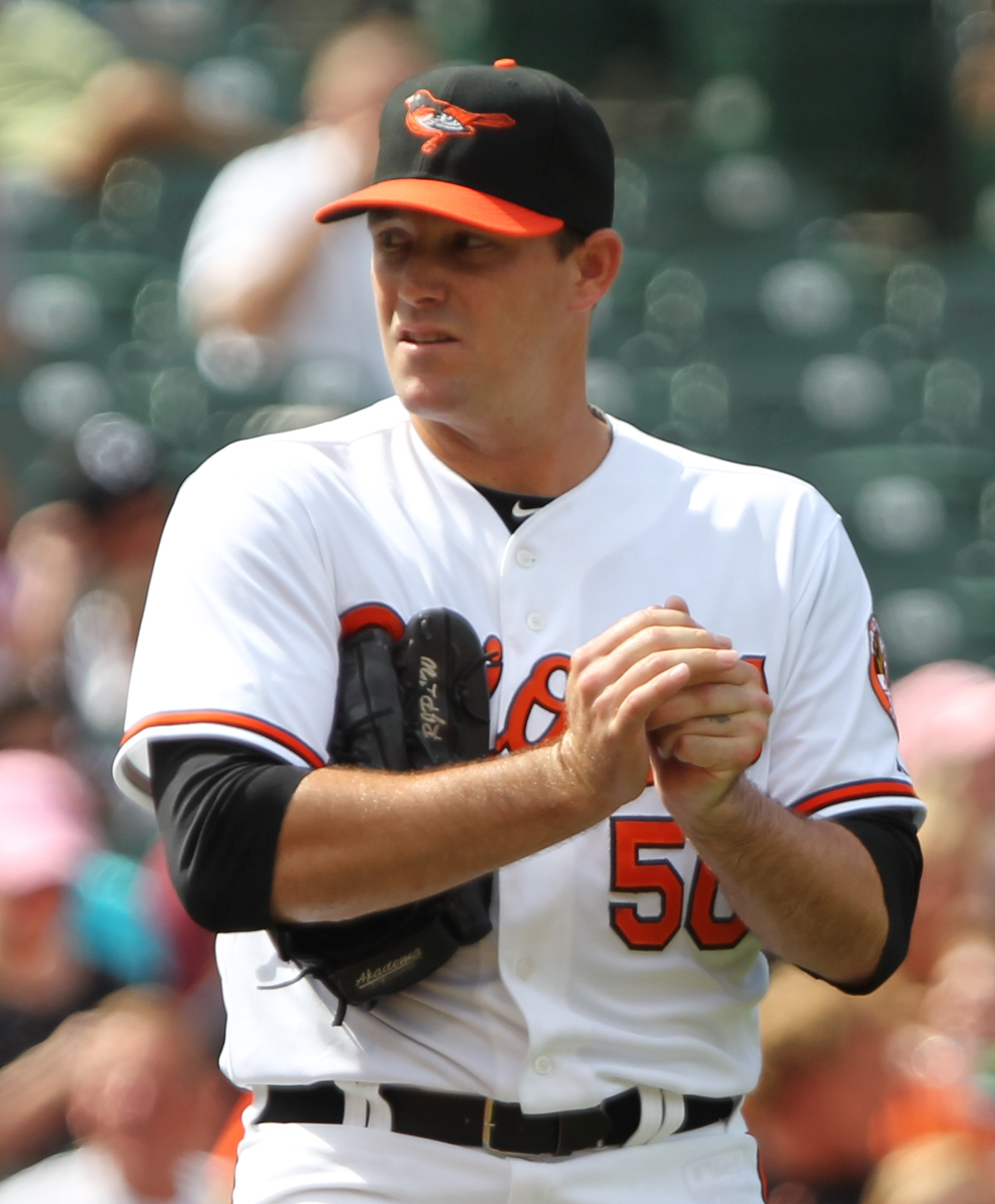
- Eyre with the Baltimore Orioles
- Relief pitcher
- Born: July 21, 1978 (age 47); Fountain Valley, California, U.S.
- Batted: Right Threw: Right

MLB debut
- April 6, 2006, for the Minnesota Twins

Last MLB appearance
- September 28, 2011, for the Baltimore Orioles

MLB statistics
- Win–loss record: 7–8
- Earned run average: 4.95
- Strikeouts: 86
- Stats at Baseball Reference

Teams
- Minnesota Twins (2006); Texas Rangers (2007, 2009); Baltimore Orioles (2011)

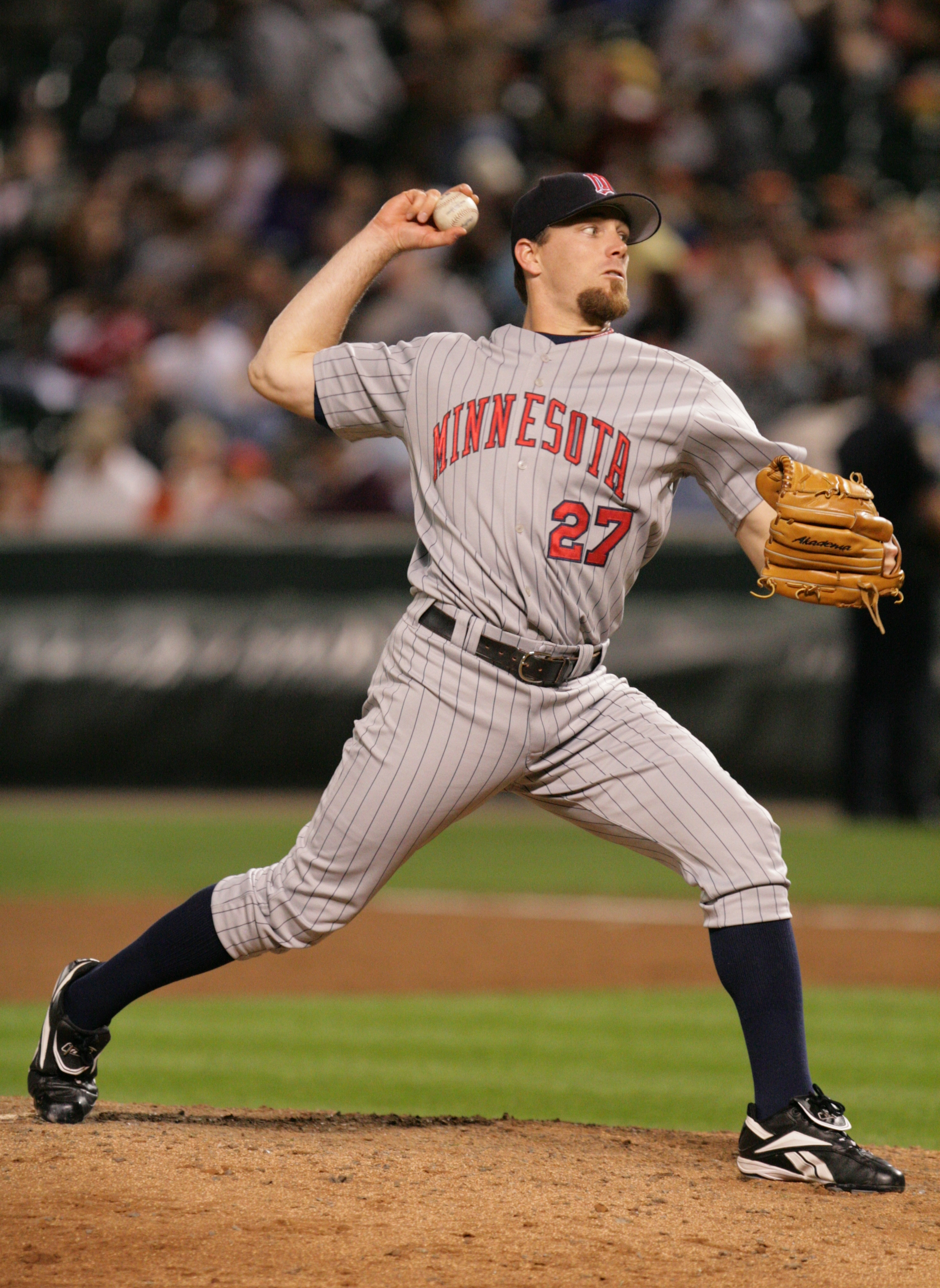
Eyre pitching for the Minnesota Twins in 2006.

William Mays Eyre (born July 21, 1978) is an American former professional baseball relief pitcher. He played in Major League Baseball (MLB) for the Minnesota Twins, Texas Rangers, and Baltimore Orioles.

== Baseball career ==
=== High school & college ===
Eyre was All-State at Cyprus High School (UT). In 1997 and 1999, he was an All-America selection playing outfield at the College of Eastern Utah.

=== Minnesota Twins ===
Eyre was drafted in the 23rd round of the 1999 Major League Baseball draft by the Minnesota Twins. From 1999 to 2005, Eyre made his way through the Twins' minor league system, playing for the rookie-level Elizabethton Twins, Single-A Quad City River Bandits, High-A Fort Myers Miracle, Double-A New Britain Rock Cats, Phoenix Desert Dogs (Arizona Fall League), and Triple-A Rochester Red Wings.

Eyre made his major league debut for the Twins on April 6, 2006. In 42 appearances for Minnesota, during his rookie campaign, he compiled a 5.31 ERA with 26 strikeouts across 59 1/3 innings pitched. On December 12, Eyre was non-tendered by the Twins, making him a free agent.

=== Texas Rangers ===
The Texas Rangers signed Eyre to a minor league contract with an invitation to spring training. Eyre had Tommy John surgery in August 2007 and missed all of 2008. He returned to the Rangers' bullpen for 2009.

Eyre spent all of the 2010 season with the Triple-A Oklahoma City RedHawks, accumulating a 5-4 record and 3.50 ERA with 59 strikeouts across 49 relief appearances. He elected free agency on October 15, 2010.

=== Oakland Athletics ===
On November 5, 2010, Eyre signed a minor league contract with the Oakland Athletics. He made 39 appearances for the Triple-A Sacramento River Cats in 2011, registering a 4-5 record and 3.48 ERA with 45 strikeouts and 9 saves across 62 innings of work. Eyre was released by the Athletics organization on August 2, 2011.

=== Baltimore Orioles ===
On August 4, 2011, Eyre signed a minor league contract with the Baltimore Orioles. On August 12, the Orioles selected Eyre's contract, adding him to their active roster. In 19 appearances for Baltimore, he compiled a 2-2 record and 3.44 ERA with 10 strikeouts across 18 1/3 innings pitched. Eyre was designated for assignment by the Orioles on December 8, and non-tendered by the team on December 12, making him a free agent.

On January 4, 2012, Eyre re-signed with the Orioles on a minor league contract. In 21 appearances for Triple-A Norfolk, he struggled to a 7.92 ERA with 20 strikeouts across 25 innings pitched. Eyre was released by the Orioles organization on June 11.

=== Texas Rangers (second stint) ===
On June 19, 2012, Eyre signed a minor league contract with the Texas Rangers - the organization with whom he pitched in the minor and major leagues from 2007 through 2010 - and resumed pitching in relief for their Triple-A affiliate, the Round Rock Express, the next day.

== Personal life and family ==
Eyre was named after Willie Mays by his mother, who was an admirer of the Hall of Fame center fielder despite being a Los Angeles Dodgers fan. He is the brother of Scott Eyre, a retired major league relief pitcher. He also has a younger brother, Robert Grace, who is playing in the minor leagues for the San Francisco Giants organization. He is married and has four children; two girls and two boys.
