= Hank Blalock =

American baseball player (born 1980)

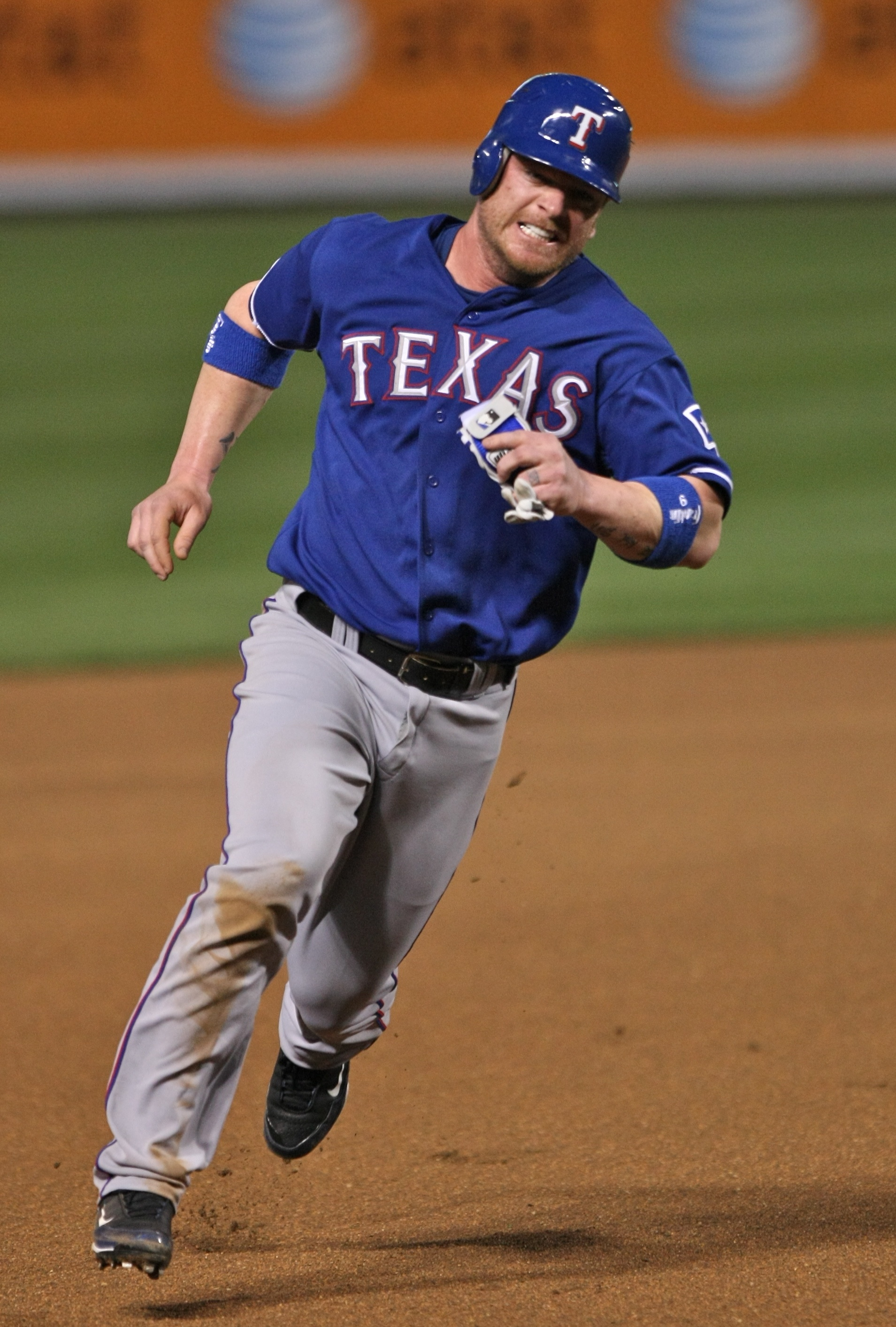
- Blalock with the Texas Rangers in 2009
- Third baseman
- Born: November 21, 1980 (age 45); San Diego, California, U.S.
- Batted: Left Threw: Right

MLB debut
- April 1, 2002, for the Texas Rangers

Last MLB appearance
- June 27, 2010, for the Tampa Bay Rays

MLB statistics
- Batting average: .269
- Home runs: 153
- Runs batted in: 542
- Stats at Baseball Reference

Teams
- Texas Rangers (2002–2009); Tampa Bay Rays (2010)

Career highlights and awards
- 2× All-Star (2003, 2004)

Hank Joe Blalock (born November 21, 1980) is an American former professional baseball third baseman. He played in Major League Baseball (MLB) for the Texas Rangers and Tampa Bay Rays.

== High school ==
Blalock attended Rancho Bernardo High School in San Diego, California. He was drafted by the Texas Rangers in the 3rd round of the 1999 Major League Baseball draft.

== Minor leagues ==
Blalock broke into professional baseball with the Gulf Coast League Rangers of the Rookie League in 1999. Blalock ended 1999, and spent all of 2000 with the Low-A Savannah Sand Gnats. Blalock burst into the public's consciousness with a huge 2001 season. Splitting time between the Charlotte Rangers of the Florida State League and the Tulsa Drillers of the Texas League, Blalock put up huge offensive numbers and hit for the cycle twice in one week, establishing himself as one of the top prospects in the game.

Blalock began the 2002 season as the Rangers' starting third baseman, but after a slow start was sent back to the minors, and spent most of the year playing for the Triple-A Oklahoma Redhawks of the Pacific Coast League.

== Major leagues ==
In 2003, Blalock had a breakthrough year, hitting 29 home runs and 90 RBIs with a .309 batting average. A combination of being able to hit for power and for average drew early comparisons to George Brett and helped him to get voted to the All-Star Game in his first full season as a Ranger, where he hit the game-winning home run off Los Angeles Dodgers closer Éric Gagné in the bottom of the 8th inning to give the American League a 7-6 victory.

Blalock finished the 2004 season with 32 home runs and over 100 RBIs, and was voted to his second All-Star Game, when he participated in the Home Run Derby. A disappointing 2005 season made Blalock the center of many trade rumors. He was not traded, however, and he played 2006 with the Rangers.

Hank had his own fan club called Hank's Homies during his time with the Rangers. They were a group of guys who wore cowboy hats, eyeblack, and Blalock jerseys to the games. The Rangers even installed hooks for the Homies to hang their sign to support Hank.

On Mother's Day, May 14, 2006, Blalock was one of more than 50 hitters who brandished a pink bat to benefit the Susan G. Komen Breast Cancer Foundation. He hit his 100th career home run on June 23, 2006, in the sixth inning of a game against the Colorado Rockies.

Blalock's decreasing performance since his breakout 2003 season led many to believe that he would be traded to make room for Mark DeRosa to take a full-time position in the Rangers' infield. However, the hiring of new manager Ron Washington, who was credited with improving the play of Oakland Athletics third baseman Eric Chavez, seemed to guarantee that Blalock would not be traded; and in fact, the Rangers declined to sign DeRosa, allowing him to file for free agency.

Blalock was diagnosed with Thoracic outlet syndrome during the 2007 season and underwent surgery in May 2007 to remove his first rib. He returned to the lineup in September, but did not take the field at third base until 2008 in spring training.

During the 2008 season, Blalock injured a hamstring, placing him on the disabled list again for the second time in two seasons. On May 18, 2008, Blalock and the Rangers announced that upon his return to the team, he would return as a first baseman. Blalock had never played first base as a professional, but he felt it was the best move for the team, as the Rangers had not seen much offensive production from their first basemen in 2008. Blalock worked with Ron Washington and spoke with Phil Nevin (who made a similar switch from third to first with San Diego in 2002) to start learning the position. With the emergence of Chris Davis at first base, Blalock temporarily returned to third, but eventually switched positions with Davis to avoid more shoulder problems.

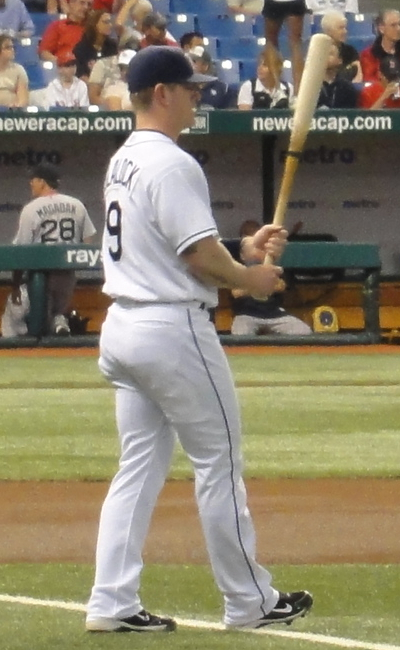
Blalock during his tenure with the Rays in 2010.

Blalock signed a minor league deal with the Tampa Bay Rays for the 2010 season. His contract was purchased on May 15. He was designated for assignment on June 29, 2010 to make room for Gabe Kapler, and was released on July 8.

Blalock retired after the 2010 season, and currently resides in San Diego.

== Family in baseball ==
Hank's younger brother, Jake Blalock, played in the Texas Rangers organization from 2006–2007, after being acquired from the Philadelphia Phillies along with Robinson Tejeda in exchange for outfielder David Dellucci on the eve of the 2006 season. Jake returned to the Phillies system in July 2007 as a free agent.

Hank's uncle, Sam, is a high school baseball coach.
