= Wes Littleton =

American baseball player

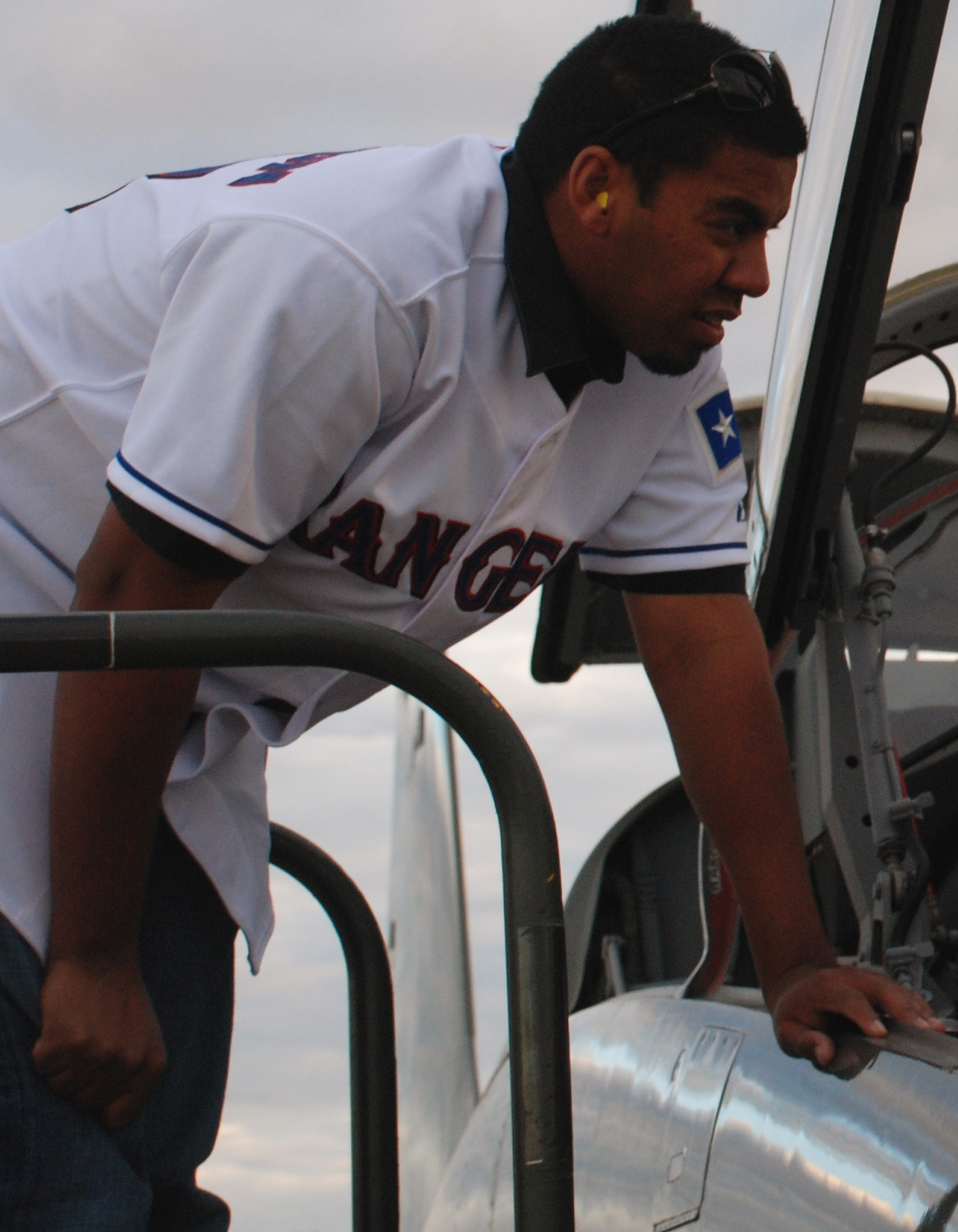
- Littleton with the Texas Rangers in 2008
- Relief pitcher
- Born: September 2, 1982 (age 44); Hayward, California, U.S.
- Batted: Right Threw: Right

MLB debut
- July 4, 2006, for the Texas Rangers

Last MLB appearance
- September 26, 2008, for the Texas Rangers

MLB statistics
- Win–loss record: 5–3
- Earned run average: 3.69
- Strikeouts: 55
- Stats at Baseball Reference

Teams
- Texas Rangers (2006–2008)

Wes Avi Littleton (born September 2, 1982) is an American former professional baseball player. A relief pitcher, he played in Major League Baseball for three seasons, all with the Texas Rangers.

== Career ==
Littleton attended Vista High School in Vista, California, and California State University, Fullerton, where he played college baseball for the Cal State Fullerton Titans. The Texas Rangers selected Littleton in the fourth round, with the 106th overall selection, of the 2003 MLB draft.

A sidearm pitcher, Littleton made his major league debut in the ninth inning of a 3–2 loss to the Toronto Blue Jays at Ameriquest Field in Arlington on July 4, 2006. He faced two batters, retiring Vernon Wells on a groundout to the third baseman and Troy Glaus on a called third strike. Littleton failed to make the Rangers' big league roster to start the 2007 season, and was optioned to the Triple-A Oklahoma RedHawks, but was later called up to play for Texas.

Littleton was credited with a save after pitching the final three scoreless innings in a 30–3 victory over the Baltimore Orioles in the first game of a twi-night doubleheader at Camden Yards on August 22, 2007. The final 27-run differential broke the previous MLB record of 19 for largest winning margin for a save. The New York Times noted that "there are the preposterous saves, of which Littleton's now stands out as No. 1."

On November 28, 2008, Littleton was traded to the Boston Red Sox in exchange for a player to be named later, minor league pitcher Beau Vaughan. On March 17, 2009, Littleton was claimed off waivers by the Milwaukee Brewers.

Littleton signed a minor league contract on March 1, 2010, with the Seattle Mariners. He spent the 2012 season with the Amarillo Sox of the American Association of Independent Professional Baseball before retiring.

== Personal life ==
Littleton has African American and Samoan heritage. He worked as a DJ during the offseason.
