= Caisson foundation =

Caisson foundation may refer to:

- Caisson (engineering)
- Deep foundation, also called a caisson foundation
