= Kevin Mahar =

American baseball player & coach (born 1981)

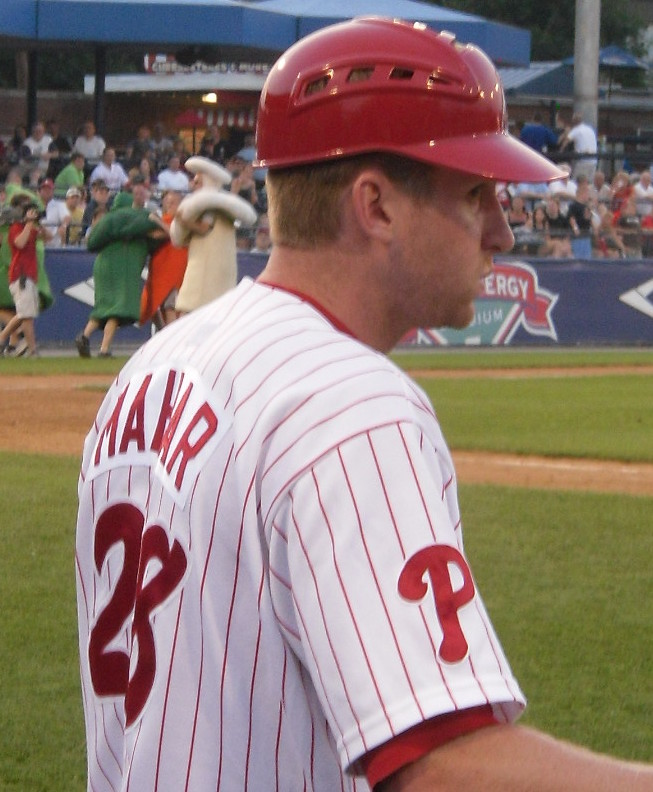
- Mahar with the Reading Phillies in 2010
- Outfielder / Coach
- Born: June 8, 1981 (age 45); Pontiac, Michigan, U.S.
- Batted: Right Threw: Right

MLB debut
- May 16, 2007, for the Texas Rangers

Last MLB appearance
- May 22, 2007, for the Texas Rangers

MLB statistics
- Batting average: .167
- Home runs: 0
- Runs batted in: 1
- Stats at Baseball Reference

Teams
- Texas Rangers (2007)

Kevin Eric Mahar (born June 8, 1981) is an American professional baseball former outfielder and current coach. He played in Major League Baseball (MLB) for the Texas Rangers in 2007.

== Playing career ==
Mahar made his major league debut on May 16, 2007, in a game against the Tampa Bay Devil Rays. This game was played at Disney's Wide World of Sports complex in Lake Buena Vista, Florida. The Rangers released Mahar during spring training 2008.

After his release from the Rangers, Mahar signed with the independent Kansas City T-Bones of the Northern League. On July 18, 2008, Mahar signed a minor league contract with the Philadelphia Phillies and played the rest of the year with the High-A Clearwater Threshers. He hit a home run in a 20-3 loss to the Fort Myers Miracle. He retired at the end of the 2010 season.

== Coaching career ==
He began his coaching career in the Cincinnati Reds organization. He served as hitting coach for the Billings Mustangs in 2013 and 2014. He served as hitting coach for the Dayton Dragons in 2015, and as their bench coach from 2017 through 2019. He was promoted to bench coach for the Louisville Bats prior to the 2020 season.
