= Rob Tejeda =

Dominican baseball player (born 1982)

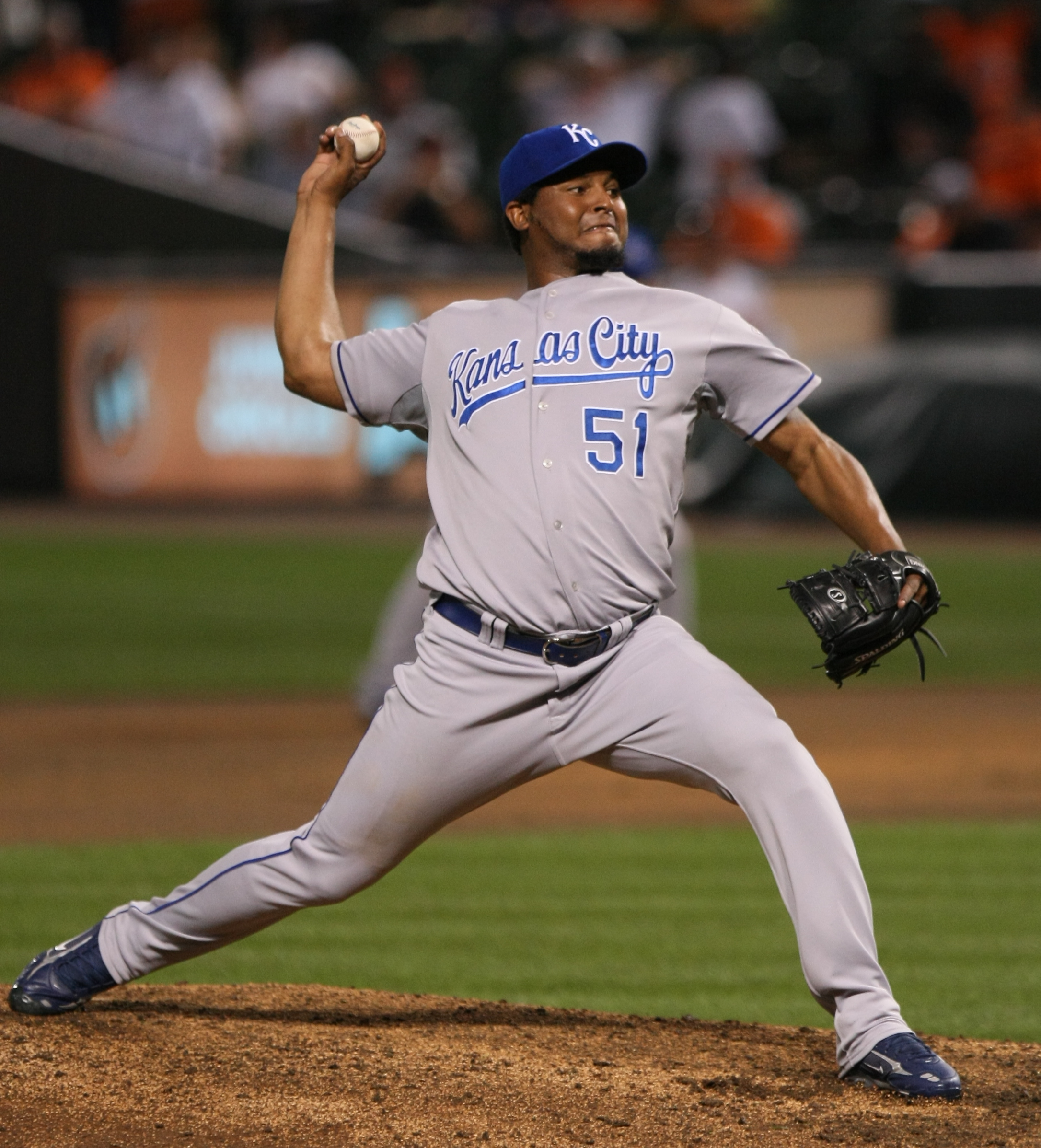
- Tejeda with the Kansas City Royals in 2009
- Pitcher
- Born: March 24, 1982 (age 44); Bani, Dominican Republic
- Batted: Right Threw: Right

MLB debut
- May 10, 2005, for the Philadelphia Phillies

Last MLB appearance
- May 25, 2011, for the Kansas City Royals

MLB statistics
- Win–loss record: 23–27
- Earned run average: 4.42
- Strikeouts: 371
- Stats at Baseball Reference

Teams
- Philadelphia Phillies (2005); Texas Rangers (2006–2008); Kansas City Royals (2008–2011)

Robinson Garcia Tejeda (born March 24, 1982) is a Dominican former professional baseball pitcher. He played in Major League Baseball (MLB) for the Philadelphia Phillies, Texas Rangers and Kansas City Royals.

== Baseball career ==
=== Philadelphia Phillies ===
Tejeda was first signed as an amateur free agent by the Philadelphia Phillies on November 24, 1998. He made his professional debut the following year with the GCL Phillies. Tejeda spent the 2001, 2002, and 2003 seasons with the Single-A Lakewood BlueClaws and Clearwater Threshers before being promoted to the Double-A Reading Phillies in 2004.

In 2005, Tejeda made the jump to the major league club. Starting with his debut against the Milwaukee Brewers on May 10, 2005, he appeared in 26 games – half of those as a starter.

Tejeda was a former member of the Dominican Republic team in the 2006 World Baseball Classic. He only made two appearances during the tournament, a shutout inning against Australia and a rough ninth-inning appearance in the Dominican Republic's first game against Cuba.

=== Texas Rangers ===
Just prior to the start of the 2006 season, Tejeda was dealt by the Phillies to the Texas Rangers along with Jake Blalock (the brother of free agent third baseman Hank Blalock) in exchange for outfielder David Dellucci. He started the season with the Triple-A Oklahoma RedHawks, but was called up to the Rangers at the end of April. His first outings were shaky, and he was quickly reassigned back to Oklahoma. Aside from an emergency call-up in June, Tejeda stayed with the RedHawks until he was recalled for good in mid-August. Tejeda was in excellent form for the latter third of the season, going 4-1 over eight starts, with an ERA of 2.01.

Tejeda earned a spot in the starting rotation for the 2007 season, but poor performance in July resulted in his demotion back to Triple-A.

=== Kansas City Royals ===
On June 24, 2008, the Kansas City Royals claimed Tejeda off waivers from the Rangers.

Tejeda throws a quality fastball (96 mph) and changeup, and is developing a useful curveball. In spring training in 2009, Tejeda led all players in walks, with 17 (in 17.1 innings).

On May 26, 2011, Tejeda was designated for assignment by the Royals. He cleared waivers and was sent outright to Triple-A Omaha Storm Chasers on June 2. He elected free agency after the season on October 7.

=== Cleveland Indians ===
On January 3, 2012, Tejeda signed a minor league contract with the Cleveland Indians. He also received an invitation to spring training. Tejeda was released by the Indians' organization on May 16, 2012.

=== Rojos del Águila de Veracruz ===
On July 6, 2013, Tejeda signed with the Rojos del Águila de Veracruz of the Mexican League. He was released on August 8. He made 5 starts throwing 27.2 innings going 1-0 with a 5.86 ERA and 19 strikeouts.

=== Joplin Blasters ===
On May 3, 2015, Tejada signed with the Joplin Blasters of the American Association of Independent Professional Baseball after sitting out the 2014 season. He was released on July 18. He made 6 starts throwing 28.1 innings struggling horribly going 1-2 with a 9.21 ERA and 16 strikeouts.
