= Kason Gabbard =

American baseball player (born 1982)

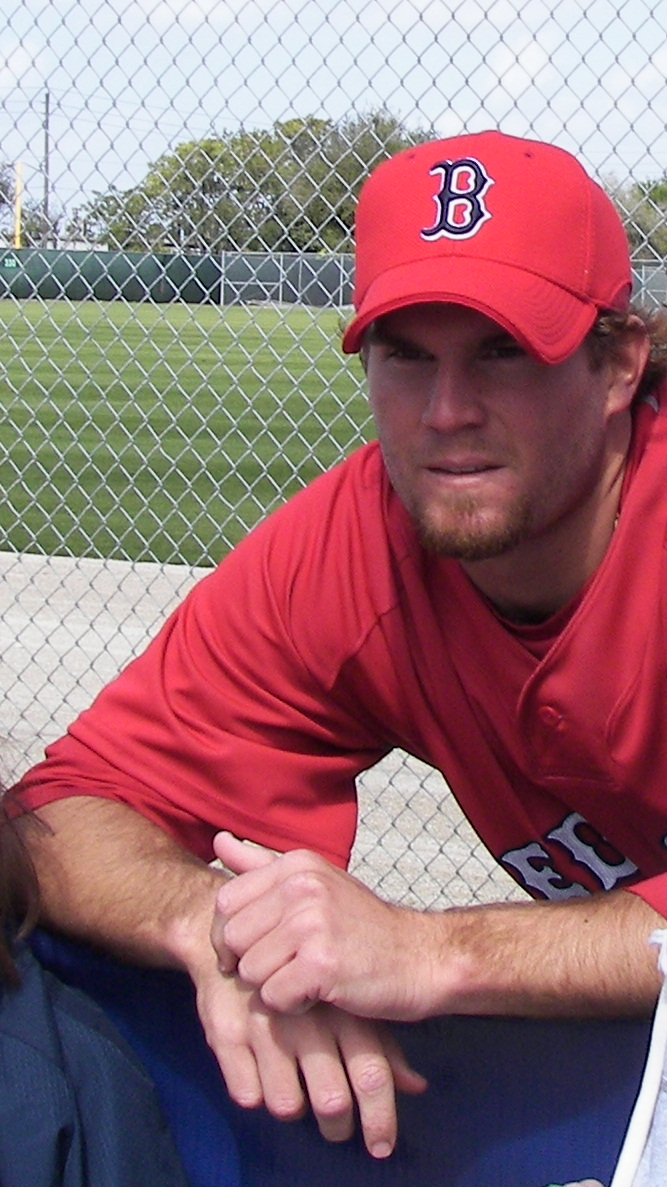
- Gabbard with the Boston Red Sox in 2007
- Pitcher
- Born: April 8, 1982 (age 44); Oxford, Ohio, U.S.
- Batted: Left Threw: Left

MLB debut
- July 22, 2006, for the Boston Red Sox

Last MLB appearance
- June 27, 2008, for the Texas Rangers

MLB statistics
- Win–loss record: 9–7
- Earned run average: 4.53
- Strikeouts: 103
- Stats at Baseball Reference

Teams
- Boston Red Sox (2006–2007); Texas Rangers (2007–2008)

Kason Ronald Gabbard (born April 8, 1982) is an American baseball coach and former professional baseball pitcher. He played three seasons in Major League Baseball (MLB), with the Boston Red Sox and Texas Rangers.

== Early life ==
Gabbard was born in 1982 in Oxford, Ohio. At age 10, he was pitching in a state tournament of the Florida Little Major League in the St. Petersburg area. At age 12, he was on an all-star team from the West Palm Beach area that won a tournament played in the Dominican Republic.

Gabbard played high school baseball at Royal Palm Beach High School in Royal Palm Beach, Florida. Childhood friend Jarrod Saltalamacchia was a freshman at the school when Gabbard was a senior. In 2000, they were both on the school's baseball team that reached the state tournament.

Gabbard was a 29th-round draft pick by the Boston Red Sox in 2000 Major League Baseball draft. He opted to enroll at Indian River Community College in Fort Pierce, Florida, where he pitched for the Pioneers baseball team, posting a 7–2 win–loss record in the spring of 2001.

== Playing career ==
=== Boston Red Sox ===
Gabbard signed with the Red Sox in May 2001. He was signed via a rule known as draft-and-follow, which allowed teams to sign—prior to the next year's draft—draftees who attended junior colleges.

Gabbard began his professional career that summer with the Gulf Coast League Red Sox, progressed to Class A the next season with the Augusta GreenJackets, and reached Class A-Advanced in 2003 with the Sarasota Red Sox. His early professional development was slowed by injury—in a two-year span he underwent four surgeries on his throwing arm, limiting him to seven games in 2002 and two games in 2003. His 2002 season was curtailed due to bone chips in his left elbow, and his 2003 season was shortened by a bone spur in that elbow, both of which resulted in season-ending surgeries.

Gabbard returned to Sarasota to start the 2004 season. He was named a Florida State League all-star, having a 3–2 record with a 2.70 earned run average (ERA) at midseason, although he did not play in the all-star game after having missed a start with an Achilles tendon injury. He was promoted to the Double-A Portland Sea Dogs in June, later played in the Arizona Fall League with the Peoria Saguaros, and returned to Portland for the 2005 season. Gabbard started the 2006 season with Portland and posted a 9–2 record with a 2.57 ERA in 13 starts. Promoted to the Triple-A Pawtucket Red Sox on June 23, he went 1–3 with a 4.97 ERA in five starts through the third week in July.

Gabbard earned a promotion to the major-league Red Sox on July 22, 2006, to replace Tim Wakefield, who was placed on the disabled list. In his major-league debut that day, Gabbard allowed two earned runs (three runs total) in 5 1/3 innings and took the loss as the Red Sox fell to the Seattle Mariners, 5–2, at Safeco Field. His first major-league win was on September 5 against the Chicago White Sox, when he pitched seven shutout innings while surrendering three hits and striking out six batters in a 1–0 Red Sox win at Fenway Park.

Gabbard became the ninth rookie (Note: Rookies are not necessarily players who have made their major-league debuts that season; per MLB, pitchers with not more than 50 innings pitched can still be considered rookies, even if they played in prior season(s).) to pitch for the 2006 Red Sox. He also became the third Triple-A call-up to move into Boston's rotation in six weeks, joining Kyle Snyder and Jon Lester, and became the 11th different pitcher to start a game for the Red Sox during the season. Overall with Boston during 2006, Gabbard appeared in seven games (four starts) and pitched to a 3.51 ERA and 1–3 record while striking out 15 batters in 25 2/3 innings pitched. The Red Sox finished third in the American League East, with a record of 86–76.

Gabbard began the 2007 season with Triple-A Pawtucket. He was recalled to Boston to start on May 20 against the Atlanta Braves in place of Josh Beckett, who was placed on the disabled list. Gabbard allowed two runs on six hits over five innings and got the win. He was then optioned back to Pawtucket. Gabbard next appeared for Boston on June 26, starting against the Seattle Mariners in place of Curt Schilling after he was placed on the disabled list. Gabbard lasted only 3 1/3 innings, allowing four runs on six hits while walking six and striking out two; he had a no decision. Despite the short outing, Red Sox manager Terry Francona opted to keep Gabbard in the rotation. On July 2, Gabbard earned the win in a 7–3 Red Sox home win over the Texas Rangers, allowing three runs on three hits while walking four and striking out five. After a no decision in a road game facing the Detroit Tigers on July 7, Gabbard recorded back-to-back wins in starts against the Kansas City Royals and the Chicago White Sox on July 16 and July 21, respectively, then had a no decision on July 26 against the Cleveland Indians. The win over the Royals was a complete game shutout, during which he allowed only three hits and one walk while striking out eight batters.

Gabbard was traded to the Texas Rangers on July 31, 2007, as part of the transaction that brought relief pitcher Éric Gagné to Boston. The Red Sox went on to win the 2007 World Series, and Gabbard was awarded a World Series ring by the team.

=== Texas Rangers ===
The same day that Boston traded Gabbard to Texas, Texas acquired his high school teammate Saltalamacchia from Atlanta. Gabbard made his Rangers debut on August 2 against Cleveland and took the loss, 5–0. On August 22, Gabbard was the winning pitcher in a game when the Rangers outscored the Baltimore Orioles, 30–3, the most runs scored in a game in the modern era.

Overall during the 2027 season with both Boston and Texas, Gabbard pitched in 15 games, all starts, and compiled a 6–1 record with a 4.65 ERA while striking out 55 batters in 81 1/3 innings.

On May 8, 2008, during his fifth start of the season for the Rangers, Gabbard was facing Richie Sexson of the Seattle Mariners with two outs and the bases empty in the bottom of the fourth inning; the Rangers held a 4–0 lead and Seattle starter Félix Hernández had already hit two Rangers batters earlier in the game. Gabbard's second pitch was head-high across the middle of the plate; although not particularly close to the batter, Sexson reacted immediately and charged the mound, throwing his batting helmet off of Gabbard's back as he approached. Sexson later stated that he expected to get hit, but objected to the pitch being head-high. Sexson was suspended six games for the incident; an appeal lowered the suspension to five games. For the season, Gabbard pitched in 12 games (all starts) with the Rangers through June 27; he then went on the disabled list and did not return to the major leagues. He had a 4.82 ERA with a 2–3 record while striking out 33 batters in 56 innings. He also spent time in the minor leagues with the Double-A Frisco RoughRiders and Triple-A Oklahoma City RedHawks.

After the Rangers' 2009 spring training camp, Gabbard was sent outright to Triple-A Oklahoma City. On April 22, Darren O'Day made his Rangers debut; he was so new to the team that his jersey had yet to arrive, so he was given one of Gabbard's to wear.

=== Boston Red Sox (second stint) ===
On April 23, 2009, the Red Sox re-acquired Gabbard from the Rangers for cash considerations, and assigned him to Triple-A Pawtucket. He had undergone elbow surgery in the offseason and had control issues—in a June 30 start for Double-A Portland, he walked four batters, hit another two, and allowed sevens runs while only recording one out. In July, he went on a rehab assignment with the Class A Short Season Lowell Spinners. Overall with three Red Sox farm teams during the 2009 season, he posted a 2–6 record with a 9.60 ERA while striking out 30 batters in 40 1/3 innings.

Gabbard pitched for Triple-A Pawtucket in 2010, mainly in relief (10 of 11 appearances). He pitched to a 5.65 ERA while striking out 10 batters in 14 1/3 innings until he was released on July 23, making him a free agent. He did not play professionally again.

=== Major-league career totals ===
During his three major-league seasons, Gabbard pitched in 34 games (31 starts) while posting a 9–7 record with a 4.53 ERA while striking out 103 batters in 163 innings pitched. As a batter, he had one hit in four at bats. His lone hit came during a Rangers loss to the New York Mets on June 15, 2008—Gabbard, the losing pitcher, singled off of Pedro Martínez, the winning pitcher, in the fourth inning.

Gabbard had better results at home than on the road—in his home ballparks he compiled a 6–1 record in 12 games (all starts) with a 3.18 ERA, while on the road he compiled a 3–6 record in 22 games (19 starts) with a 5.42 ERA. During his time with the Red Sox, Gabbard started five games at Fenway Park and won all of them. He was the third player in franchise history to win each of his first five home starts, following George Winter in 1901 and Dave Ferriss in 1945. Gabbard also won his first home start as a member of the Rangers, making him one of only a few major-league pitchers to win each of their first six home starts (the feat had most recently been accomplished by Carlos Pérez in 1995 and Mark Fidrych in 1976). His streak ended with his second home start for the Rangers, when he had a no decision after leaving in the second inning due to injury.

==== Pitching style ====
Gabbard had the standard repertoire of fastball, curveball, and changeup, occasionally throwing a slider. Gabbard's fastball hit the high-80s, his changeup worked the best low and away on right-handed hitters, and his slow curveball was especially effective against lefties. Not a power strikeout pitcher, Gabbard was compared to Mark Buehrle and Kenny Rogers.

== Coaching career ==
From 2012 through 2014, Gabbard was the varsity pitching coach at his former high school in Royal Palm Beach, Florida; he then served as varsity head coach for the 2015 season. The 2015 team included pitcher Triston McKenzie, who went on play in the major leagues. Later that year, Gabbard joined IMG Academy in Bradenton, Florida, where he became national team head coach.
