= Kameron Loe =

American baseball player (born 1981)

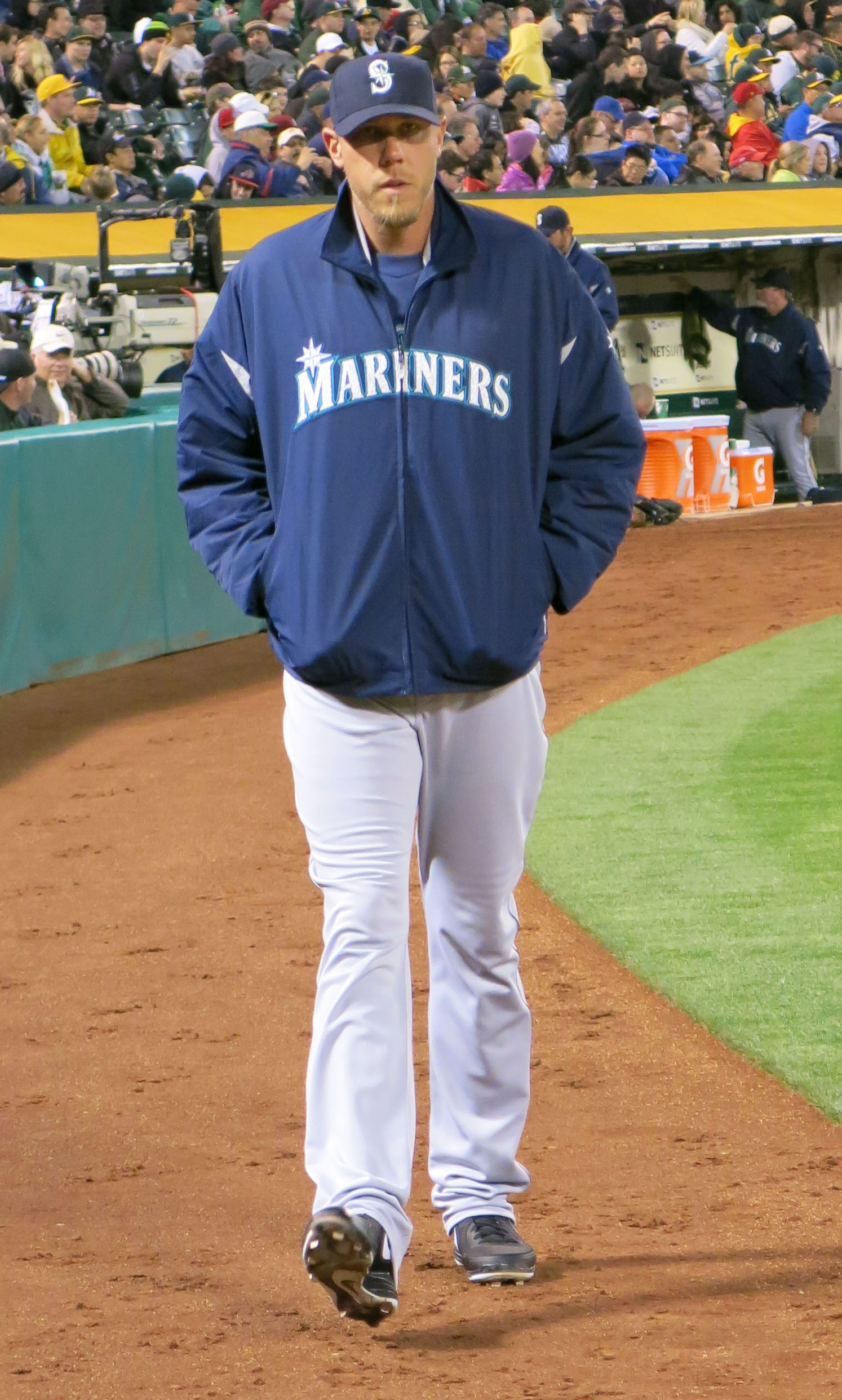
- Loe with the Mariners in 2013
- Pitcher
- Born: September 10, 1981 (age 44); Simi Valley, California, U.S.
- Batted: Right Threw: Right

Professional debut
- MLB: September 26, 2004, for the Texas Rangers
- NPB: 2009, for the Fukuoka SoftBank Hawks

Last appearance
- NPB: 2009, for the Fukuoka SoftBank Hawks
- MLB: September 28, 2013, for the Atlanta Braves

MLB statistics
- Win–loss record: 34–43
- Earned run average: 4.49
- Strikeouts: 357

NPB statistics
- Win–loss record: 0–4
- Earned run average: 6.33
- Strikeouts: 18
- Stats at Baseball Reference

Teams
- Texas Rangers (2004–2008); Fukuoka SoftBank Hawks (2009); Milwaukee Brewers (2010–2012); Seattle Mariners (2013); Chicago Cubs (2013); Atlanta Braves (2013)

Kameron David Loe (born September 10, 1981) is an American former professional baseball pitcher. He played in Major League Baseball (MLB) for the Texas Rangers, Milwaukee Brewers, Seattle Mariners, Chicago Cubs, and Atlanta Braves. At 6 feet 8 inches (2.03 m), Loe was one of the tallest players in the long history of the game.

== Baseball career ==
=== Amateur ===
Kameron Loe played high school baseball at Granada Hills High School with Ryan Braun.

Loe played college baseball at California State University, Northridge from 1999 to 2002, and was drafted by the Philadelphia Phillies in 1999 but did not sign. He was then drafted by the Texas Rangers in the 20th round of the 2002 Major League Baseball draft.

=== Texas Rangers ===
He made his MLB debut with the Rangers on September 26, 2004, against the Seattle Mariners, working 2.2 scoreless innings of relief. In his next appearance on September 29, he made his first start against the Anaheim Angels. He allowed five runs in 4 innings though did not receive a decision.

He recorded his first win in a two inning extra-inning relief appearance against the Angels on June 29, 2005. In the 2005 season, Loe made 48 appearances, 8 of them starts, compiling a record of 9–6, with a 3.42 ERA. Loe missed much of the 2006 due to a bone bruise in his right elbow.

In late March 2008 he was considered one of three pitchers vying for one long relief spot with the team, along with Josh Rupe and Scott Feldman.

From 2004-2008 with the Rangers, he pitched in 107 games (47 starts) with a 4.77 ERA.

=== Fukuoka SoftBank Hawks ===
On November 20, 2008, Loe was acquired by the Fukuoka SoftBank Hawks. He appeared in just 5 games for the Hawks and was 0-4 with a 6.33 ERA.

=== Milwaukee Brewers ===
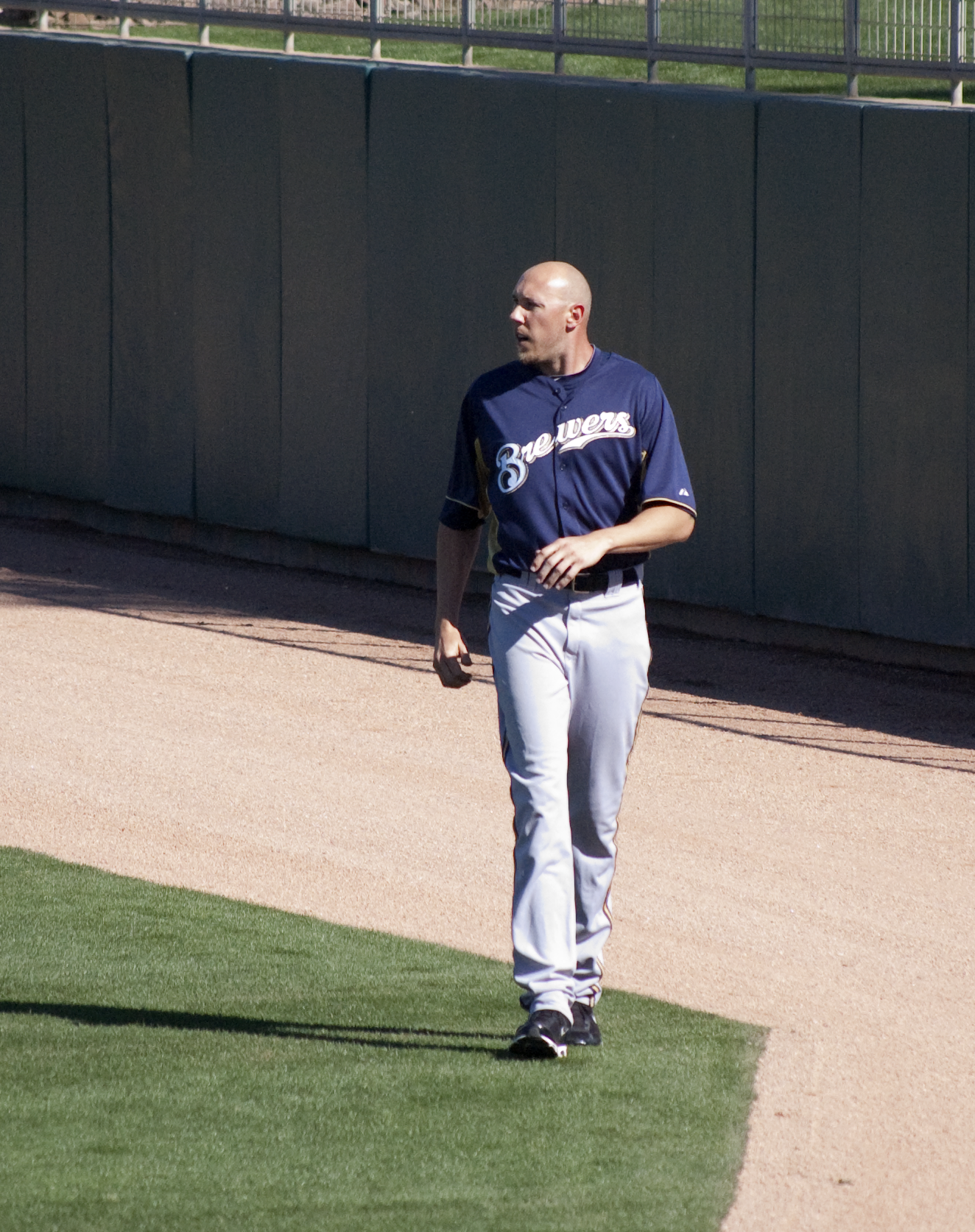
Kameron Loe in 2011 with the Brewers.

On December 18, 2009, Loe signed a minor league contract with the Milwaukee Brewers, which contained an invitation to spring training. After beginning the season with the AAA Nashville Sounds, Loe was called up to the big league roster by the Brewers on June 1, 2010.

In 2011, he was 4-7 with a 3.50 ERA. In 2012, Loe went 6-5 with a 4.61 ERA with 68.1 innings in 70 appearances.

On November 2, Loe elected to become a free agent after refusing his minor league assignment. In parts of 3 seasons with the Brewers, he was 13-17 with a 3.67 ERA in 195 games (all in relief).

=== Seattle Mariners ===
On February 12, 2013, Loe signed a minor league contract with the Seattle Mariners. He was added to the 40 man roster on March 25, 2013. He was designated for assignment on April 11.

=== Chicago Cubs ===
On April 14, 2013, Loe was claimed off waivers by the Chicago Cubs. He was designated for assignment on May 6, he cleared waivers and was released on May 10.

=== Atlanta Braves ===
On May 11, 2013, Loe signed a minor league contract with the Atlanta Braves. After pitching in 21 games for Triple-A Gwinnett, he was called up on July 21. On July 29, Loe was designated for assignment to make room for the recently acquired Scott Downs, he cleared waivers and was sent outright to Triple-A Gwinnett Braves on July 31. He had his contract selected again on September 2. Loe did not make the Braves' postseason roster, he became a free agent following the season.

=== San Francisco Giants ===
On January 13, 2014, Loe signed a minor league deal with the San Francisco Giants. On March 22, Loe opted out of his contract and became a free agent.

=== Kansas City Royals ===
On April 12, 2014, Loe signed a minor league contract with the Kansas City Royals. He was released on May 24.

=== Atlanta Braves (second stint) ===
On May 27, 2014, Loe signed a minor league contract with the Atlanta Braves. He was released on June 30.

=== Arizona Diamondbacks ===
On July 4, 2014, Loe signed a minor league contract with the Arizona Diamondbacks. After becoming a free agent following the season, Loe tested positive for a "drug of abuse" and was suspended for 50 games.

=== Bridgeport Bluefish ===
On June 20, 2015, Loe signed with the Bridgeport Bluefish of the Atlantic League of Professional Baseball. In 9 starts for Bridgeport, he posted a 4–3 record and 4.87 ERA with 44 strikeouts over 57 1/3 innings of work. Loe announced his retirement from professional baseball on August 7.

=== Chicago White Sox ===
On March 3, 2016, Loe came out of retirement and signed a minor league contract with the Chicago White Sox. On March 29, he was suspended for 80 games following a positive steroid test. Following his suspension, Loe made 13 appearances (12 starts) for the Triple–A Charlotte Knights and posted a 4.63 ERA with 40 strikeouts across 68 innings pitched. He elected free agency following the season on November 7.

=== Tigres de Quintana Roo ===
On April 10, 2017, Loe signed with the Tigres de Quintana Roo of the Mexican League. In 22 starts, he compiled an 8–8 record and 4.07 ERA with 110 strikeouts across 132 2/3 innings pitched. Loe became a free agent following the 2017 season.

== Personal life ==
Married Bree Ransom of Scottsdale, AZ (2015) and they have a child by the name of Brynlee Loe who was born in 2016.

Loe owned a 7-foot boa constrictor named Angel who he put up for adoption when he left the United States and moved to Japan for his job with the Fukuoka SoftBank Hawks in 2009.
