= Cason (surname) =

Cason is a surname. Notable people with the surname include:

- Andre Cason, American sprinter
- Antoine Cason, American football player
- Aveion Cason, American football player
- Barbara Cason, American actor
- Buzz Cason, American rock singer
- Chris Cason, American voice actor
- Cleo S. Cason, American librarian
- James Cason, U.S. Foreign Service officer
- Jim Cason (1927–2013), American football player
- John L. Cason (1918–1961), American actor
- Lino Cason, Italian soccer player
- L.J. Cason (born 2006), American basketball player
- Rod Cason, American football player
- Thomas J. Cason, American politician
- Wendell Cason, American football player
- William J. Cason (1924–2017), American politician
- Yvette Cason, American actor
