= Joaquín Benoit =

Dominican baseball player (born 1977)

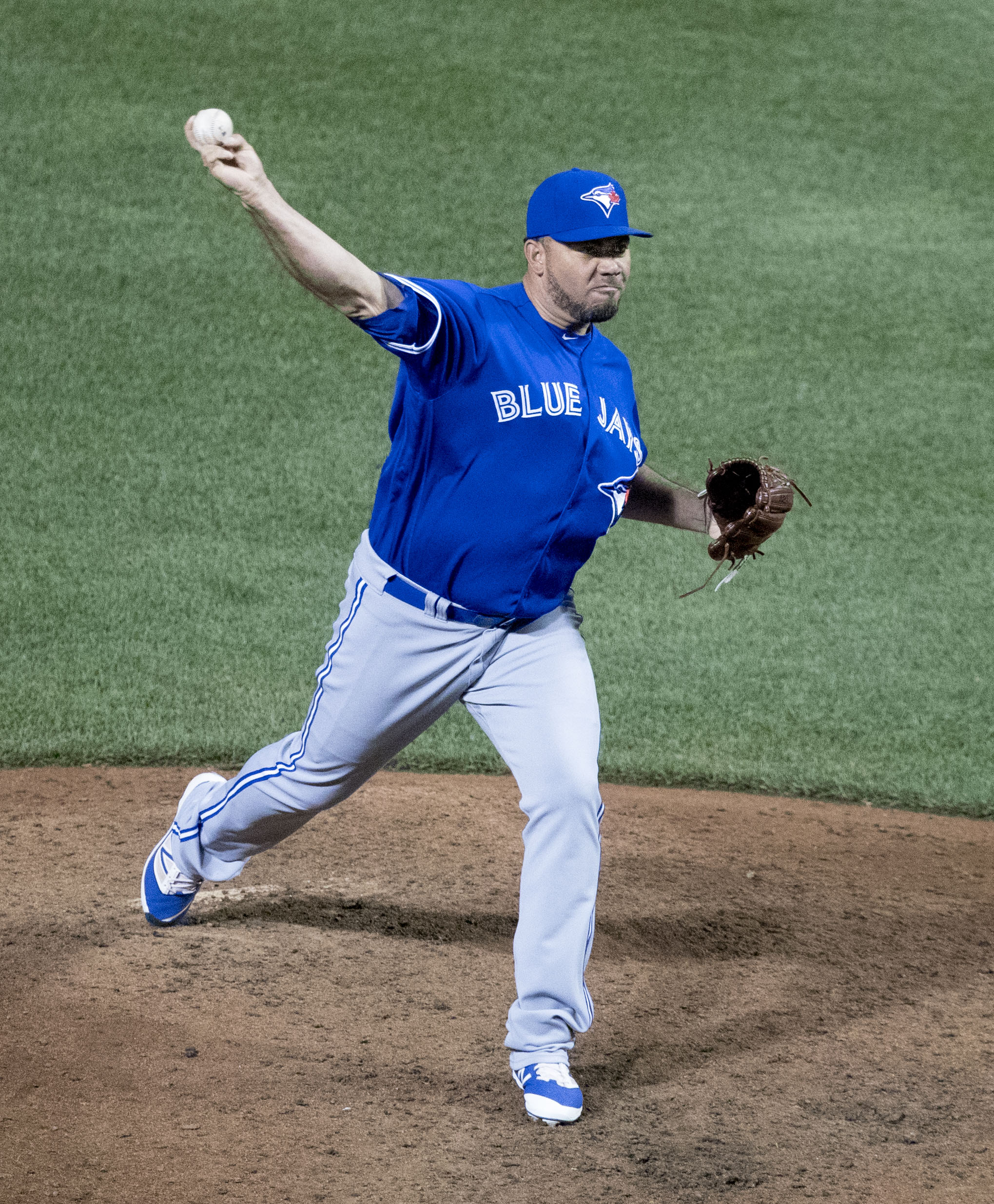
- Benoit with the Toronto Blue Jays in 2016
- Pitcher
- Born: July 26, 1977 (age 49); Santiago, Dominican Republic
- Batted: Right Threw: Right

MLB debut
- August 8, 2001, for the Texas Rangers

Last MLB appearance
- September 7, 2017, for the Pittsburgh Pirates

MLB statistics
- Win–loss record: 58–49
- Earned run average: 3.83
- Strikeouts: 1,058
- Stats at Baseball Reference

Teams
- Texas Rangers (2001–2008); Tampa Bay Rays (2010); Detroit Tigers (2011–2013); San Diego Padres (2014–2015); Seattle Mariners (2016); Toronto Blue Jays (2016); Philadelphia Phillies (2017); Pittsburgh Pirates (2017)

Joaquín Antonio Benoit Peña (born July 26, 1977) is a Dominican former professional baseball pitcher. He played in Major League Baseball (MLB) for the Texas Rangers, Tampa Bay Rays, Detroit Tigers, San Diego Padres, Seattle Mariners, Toronto Blue Jays, Philadelphia Phillies, Pittsburgh Pirates, and Washington Nationals.

== Professional career ==
=== Texas Rangers ===
Signing with the Rangers at the age of 18, Benoit was with the Rangers' organization until 2009. Except rehab assignments after stints on the disabled list, he was with the Major League club full-time since midway through the 2003 season. Benoit's seven years with the Texas Rangers made him the second-longest tenured member of the team after Michael Young.

Originally a starter, Benoit was moved to the bullpen part-time in the 2003 season. Since then, he had served in various relief roles, making spot starts as necessary.

Benoit holds the Major League record for having recorded the longest save, seven innings, since it became an official statistic in 1969. (Note: Benoit bested the previous record of six innings by Horacio Piña of the Rangers in 1972. Baseball-Reference.com retroactively credited eight-inning saves to pitchers prior to 1969 including Jim Shaw (1920), Guy Morton (1920), and Dick Hall (1961).) He relieved Todd Van Poppel at the start of the third inning against the Baltimore Orioles on September 3, 2002, and nearly completed a combined no-hitter, as Baltimore's only hit in the game came leading off the ninth inning. The official scorer credited the win to Van Poppel and not Benoit, a decision that was also supported by Texas manager Jerry Narron.

In 2006, Benoit ranked in the top-10 American League relievers in strikeouts, innings pitched, and percentage of inherited runners who scored.

On January 27, 2009, Benoit underwent surgery to fix a torn rotator cuff and missed the 2009 season. He became a free agent following the season.

=== Tampa Bay Rays ===
On March 4, 2010, Benoit signed a minor league contract with an invitation to spring training with the Tampa Bay Rays. He was called up to the Rays and debuted with the team April 29. He put together an incredible campaign and established himself as one of the game's premier setup men. Benoit finished with a 1.34 ERA and 0.68 WHIP, allowing just 30 hits, 11 walks, and nine earned runs in 60 1/3 innings while fanning 75 batters. His strong season resulted in his winning the Tony Conigliaro Award. He became a free agent following the season.

=== Detroit Tigers ===
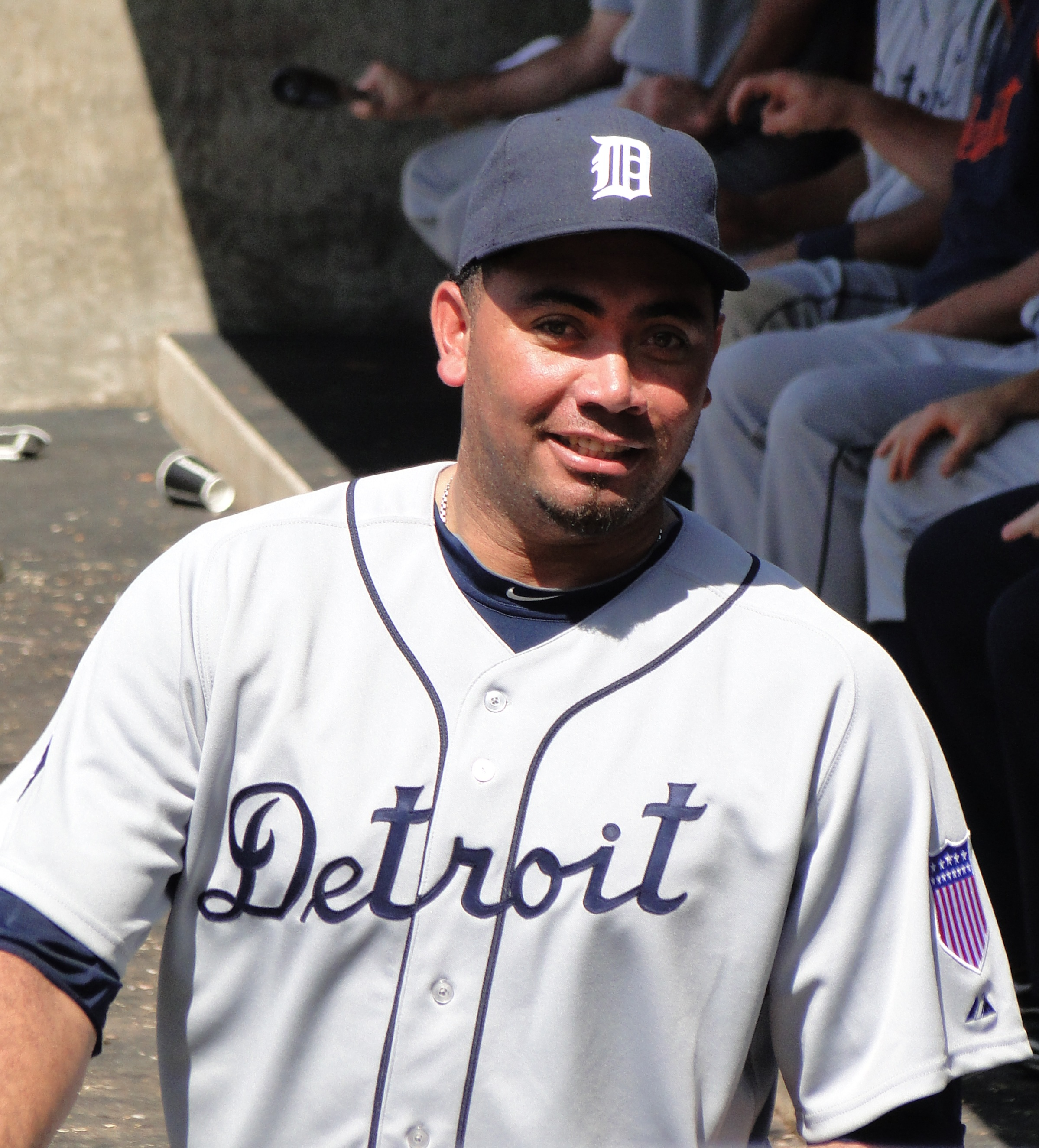
Benoit with the Tigers in 2011

On November 19, 2010, Benoit signed a three-year contract with the Detroit Tigers. The deal was worth $16.5 million with performance bonuses up to $1 million annually.

Benoit didn't replicate his outstanding 2010 season but had a solid 2011 nonetheless, finishing with a 4–3 record, 2.95 ERA and 1.05 WHIP. He struck out 63 hitters in 61 innings, allowing just 47 hits and 20 earned runs. Benoit came on in relief in the decisive Game 5 of the American League Divisional Series against New York and recorded five crucial outs. He escaped a bases-loaded, one-out jam, allowing just one run thanks to strikeouts of Alex Rodriguez and Nick Swisher.

Joaquín had a moderately successful 2012 campaign as the Tigers primary setup man, finishing with a 3.68 ERA while striking out 84 batters in 71 innings.

In 2013, Benoit became the Tigers' closer. He replaced José Valverde, who accepted an assignment to the Toledo Mud Hens on June 21, and was subsequently released. Joaquín successfully converted his first 22 save opportunities of the season, before blowing saves in two of his final four chances, making him 24-of-26 overall. He finished the regular season with a 2.01 ERA and a 1.03 WHIP. In Game 2 of the American League Championship Series against the Boston Red Sox, Benoit gave up a game-tying grand slam to David Ortiz, which tied the game at 5. The Red Sox would go on to win the game 6–5, and eventually the series 4–2. Benoit became a free agent following the season.

=== San Diego Padres ===
On December 28, 2013, Benoit and the San Diego Padres agreed to a two-year, $15.5 million contract. Benoit served as the set up man for the first half of the 2014 season but was moved into the closer role after Huston Street was traded to the Los Angeles Angels of Anaheim. Benoit returned to the setup role in 2015, after the Padres acquired Craig Kimbrel from the Atlanta Braves in a blockbuster trade that was completed on the day before opening day of the upcoming season.

After the 2015 season, the Padres exercised their $7.5 million option on Benoit for 2016.

=== Seattle Mariners ===
On November 12, 2015, the Padres traded Benoit to the Seattle Mariners for Enyel De Los Santos and Nelson Ward. Benoit had a 5.18 ERA in 24 1/3 innings to start the 2016 season with Seattle.

=== Toronto Blue Jays ===
On July 26, 2016, the Mariners traded Benoit to the Toronto Blue Jays for pitcher Drew Storen and cash. Benoit struck out Evan Longoria to record his 1,000th career strikeout in a game against the Tampa Bay Rays on September 4. On September 26, Benoit suffered a torn left calf while rushing out of the bullpen during a bench-clearing brawl against the New York Yankees, and was declared out for the remainder of the regular season. He made 25 appearances for the Blue Jays in 2016, and posted a 0.38 ERA through 23 2/3 innings pitched. He became a free agent following the season.

=== Philadelphia Phillies ===
On December 6, 2016, Benoit signed a one-year, $7.5 million deal with the Philadelphia Phillies.

On April 10, 2017, Benoit was named the team's closer, replacing Jeanmar Gómez.

=== Pittsburgh Pirates ===
On July 31, 2017, the Phillies traded Benoit to the Pittsburgh Pirates for Seth McGarry. Benoit became a free agent following the season.

=== Washington Nationals ===
On February 21, 2018, the Washington Nationals signed Benoit to a one-year deal. He elected free agency on October 29.

== Pitching style ==
Benoit featured three pitches. He threw a mid-90s fastball, a mid-80s slider, and a low-80s changeup that he would throw at any time in the count. Benoit owed much of his success to his ability to limit batting average on balls in play and maintain a high strand rate.
