= John Rheinecker =

American baseball player (1979-2017)

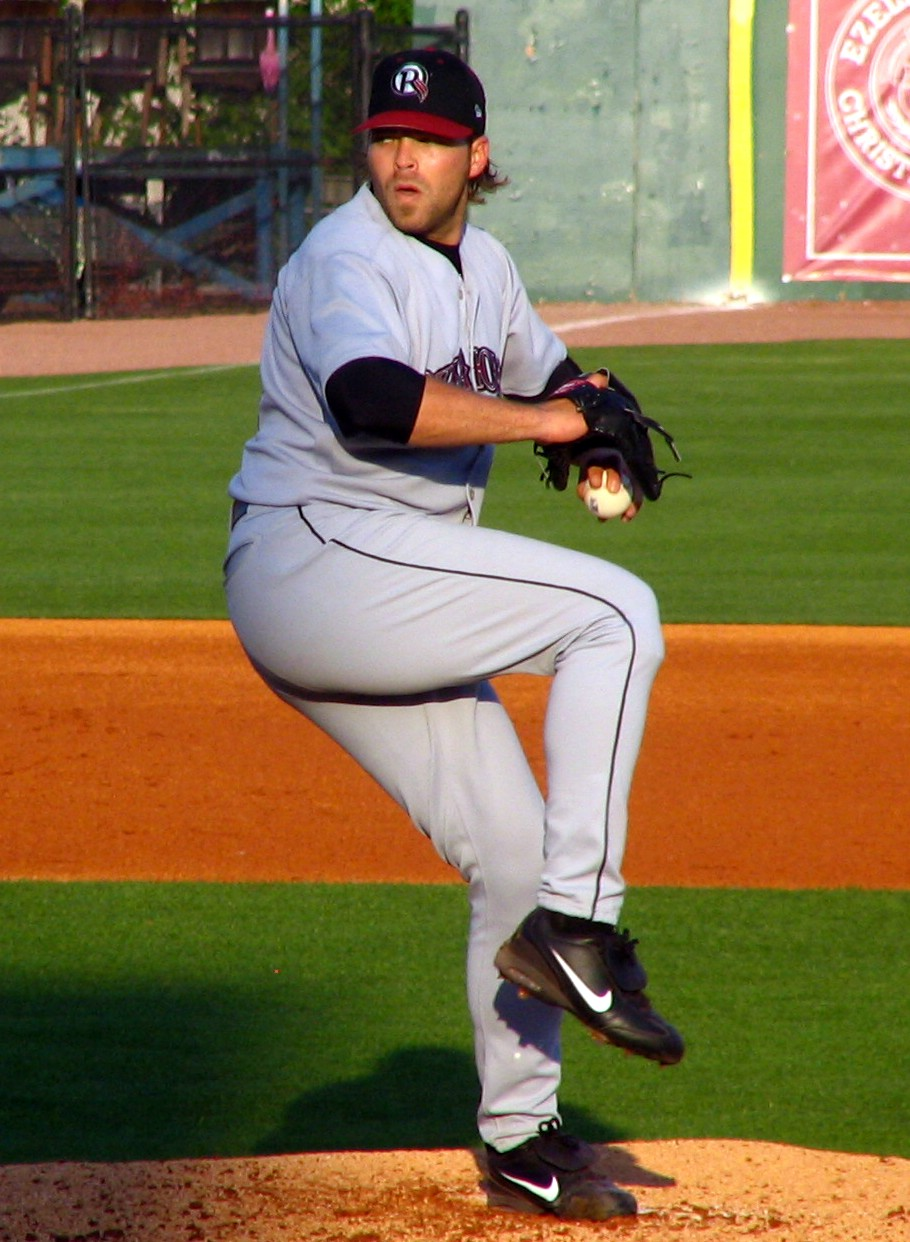
- Rheinecker pitching for the Oklahoma RedHawks in 2006
- Pitcher
- Born: May 29, 1979; Belleville, Illinois, U.S.
- Died: July 18, 2017 (aged 38); St. Louis, Missouri, U.S.
- Batted: Left Threw: Left

MLB debut
- April 22, 2006, for the Texas Rangers

Last MLB appearance
- September 28, 2007, for the Texas Rangers

MLB statistics
- Win–loss record: 8–9
- Earned run average: 5.65
- Strikeouts: 68
- Stats at Baseball Reference

Teams
- Texas Rangers (2006–2007)

John Philip Rheinecker (May 29, 1979 – July 18, 2017) was an American professional baseball pitcher. He played in Major League Baseball (MLB) for the Texas Rangers.

== Early life ==
Rheinecker attended Gibault Catholic High School in Waterloo, Illinois, and was a letterman in baseball. He grew up in Hecker, Illinois and first starred at the Hecker Dome. In baseball, as a senior, he batted .438 and as a pitcher, posted a 7-11 record and a 2.49 ERA.

== College and professional career ==
Prior to playing professional baseball, Rheinecker attended Belleville Area College and Southwest Missouri State. He was drafted by the Oakland Athletics in 2001.

After signing with the A's, Rheinecker spent the next four seasons in the organization's farm system. On March 31, 2006, Oakland traded him (along with infielder Freddie Bynum) to the Texas Rangers for pitcher Juan Dominguez.

A southpaw starting pitcher, Rheinecker made his major league debut April 22, 2006, in a game against the Tampa Bay Devil Rays. On his 27th birthday (May 29, 2006, which was also Memorial Day), Rheinecker made his second start for the Rangers, pitching 8 1/3 shutout innings and earning his first major league win. For most of the 2006 season, he was shuttled back and forth between the Rangers and their Triple-A affiliate, the Oklahoma RedHawks.

Rheinecker was hit by a pitch from Noah Lowry in his only Major League plate appearance on June 28, 2006. As of 2019, he is one of only six players in history to be hit by a pitch in his only Major League turn at bat.

During the April 27–30, 2007, four game series at Toronto, Rheinecker forgot his passport, and thus could not play in the games.

Rheinecker was diagnosed with thoracic outlet syndrome (TOS) and underwent surgery to remove a rib to alleviate the symptoms. Arthroscopic shoulder surgery was performed on May 24, 2008, to clean up the shoulder joint. This caused him to miss the entire 2008 season other than two minor league rehab starts. He became a free agent at the end of the season.

== Death ==
On July 18, 2017, Rheinecker died after hanging himself in a garage. According to family members, Rheinecker had been dealing with depression. His wife Jamie told investigators that he was a heavy alcohol user, and it was determined that he was under the influence of alcohol when he hanged himself. He was survived by his wife Jamie, two children, and two stepchildren.
