= Kason Sugioka =

Japanese calligrapher

Kason Sugioka (杉岡 華邨, Sugioka Kason; March 6, 1913 – March 3, 2012) was a Japanese calligrapher, pedagogue and recipient of the Order of Culture, the Nara Prefecture Culture Award, The Minister Of Education Award Nitten, The Japan Art Academy Award, and in 2000, the Sugioka Calligraphy Museum was opened in Gango-ji – an UNESCO world heritage site.

== Early life ==
Sugioka was born in Yoshino-gun village in Shimokitayama, Nara. He continued to study calligraphy immediately after graduation from high school. Sugioka received his teaching certificate from the Osaka Kyoiku University, then studied literature and aesthetics at Kyoto University and afterwards learned the art of zen from Shin'ichi Hisamatsu.

== Career ==
Sugioka exhibited regularly at Nitten and other exhibitions and was regularly published in the Yomiuri Shimbun. He also had many students and published books.

== Books ==
- Kanasho no Bi o Hiraku: Sho to Hito (1998)
- Kanasho no Bi Chirashi no Sekai (2000)
- Daihyosaku ni miru Kason Rokujunen no Ayumi (Narashi Sugioka Kason Shodo Bijutsukan Kaikan Kinen) (2000)
- Yamato no Uta Man yo no Uta (Narashi Sugioka Kason Shodo Bijutsukan Kaikan Kinen Tokubetsuten) (2001)
- Kana no Miyabi: Kason no Hosoji (2001)
- Kokoro no Sho: Kason no Chuji Daiji (Narashi Sugioka Kason Shodo Bijutsukan Kaikan Kinen Tokubetsuten Dai 5ki) (2001)
