= 2008 Texas Rangers season =

2008 Texas Rangers
- League: American League
- Division: West
- Ballpark: Rangers Ballpark in Arlington
- City: Arlington, Texas
- Record: 79–83 (.488)
- Divisional place: 2nd
- Owners: Tom Hicks
- General managers: Jon Daniels
- Managers: Ron Washington
- Television: FSN Southwest; KDFI (My27); KDFW (Fox 4)
- Radio: KRLD; KFLC (Spanish)

The Texas Rangers 2008 season was the 48th year of the franchise and 37th since moving to Arlington, Texas. The organization, after finishing fourth in the American League West in 2007. The new season would be the first under the oversight of newly hired club president and former Ranger great Nolan Ryan. Upon his hire, Ryan indicated that his role in the 2008 season would be largely observational with regard to baseball operations, and any major changes would be made following the conclusion of the regular season.

I don't come in with any preconceived ideas of what I want to do or what needs to be done", said Ryan, who indicated that he will make two extended trips to spring training to become acquainted with players and staff. "I think it'll be a learning process for me. I'm going to try to get my arms around our organization so I'll have a better understanding of who we are and what we do and what I can do to help us be better.

— Nolan Ryan, February 8, 2008

The Rangers set a Major League record for the most doubles by a team in a season, with 376.

== Preseason ==
=== Notable offseason transactions ===
The Rangers' offseason was filled with activity as Jon Daniels moved to quickly acquire talent both on and off the field. The 2007 club roster fielded several arbitration-eligible players, whose status for 2008 remained unsure. Several of these players would sign short-term contracts with the Rangers while others would seek playing time elsewhere.

==== 2007 ====
- OFs Sammy Sosa, Brad Wilkerson, and IF Jerry Hairston Jr. signed with other clubs in the offseason.
- Hitting coach Rudy Jaramillo signed a new 2-year contract with the Rangers; RHPs Frank Francisco and Joaquín Benoit also signed 1- and 2-year extensions with the club.
- RHP Warner Madrigal signed as a minor league free agent after the Los Angeles Angels failed to add him to the team's 40-man roster before free agency began.
- December 8: OF Milton Bradley signed a 1-year contract for $5 million.
- December 21: OF Josh Hamilton acquired from the Cincinnati Reds for RHP Edinson Vólquez and RHP Danny Herrera.
- December 29: 1B Chris Shelton acquired from the Detroit Tigers in exchange for minor league OF Freddy Guzman.

==== January 2008 ====
- January 5: 1B Ben Broussard acquired via trade from the Seattle Mariners for minor leaguer Tug Hulett and signed to a 1-year contract worth $3.85 million, avoiding salary arbitration.
- January 11–18: LHP Eddie Guardado ($2 million), RHP Jason Jennings ($4m), C Gerald Laird ($6m), and OF Marlon Byrd ($1.8m) all signed 1-year contracts with the Rangers.
- January 14: RHP Kazuo Fukumori agreed to a 2-year contract worth $3 million.
- January 25: RHP Armando Galarraga designated for assignment and traded to the Tigers in exchange for minor league OF Michael Hernandez.

==== February and March ====
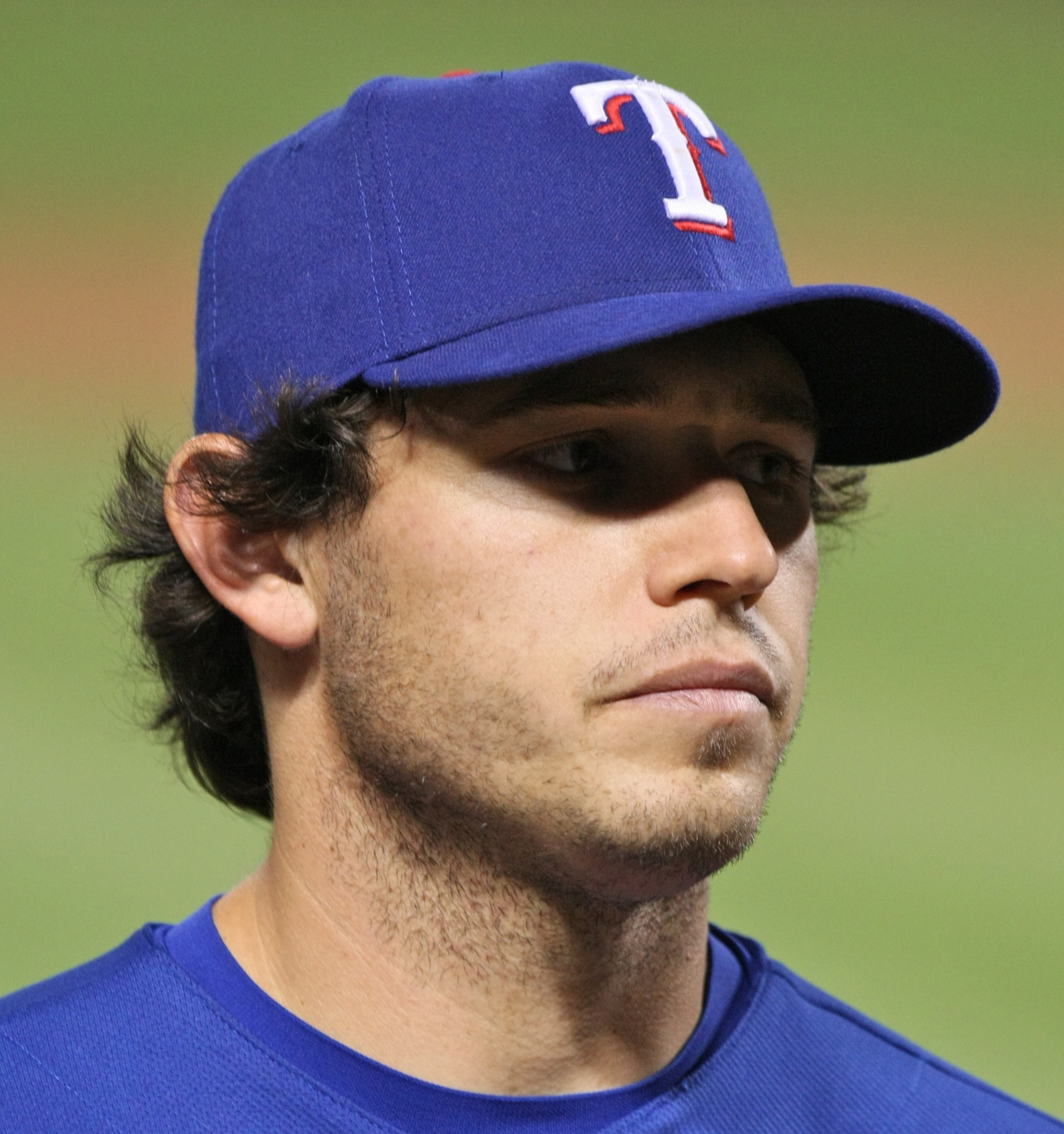
Ian Kinsler

- February 19: 2B Ian Kinsler signed a 5-year extension for $22 million, keeping him with the Rangers through 2012.
- February 25: The Rangers agreed to terms with 7 players: OF David Murphy, 3B Travis Metcalf, RHPs Brandon McCarthy and Wes Littleton, and LHP A. J. Murray. The other two, RHPs Alexi Ogando and Omar Beltré remained on the restricted list until their legal issues were resolved prior to the 2010 season.
- February 28: General Manager Jon Daniels and Rangers President Nolan Ryan signed contracts through the 2011 season.
- March 25: OF Nelson Cruz designated for assignment, cleared waivers, and later assigned to the minor leagues.

== Regular season ==
=== Opening Day starters ===
- Gerald Laird, C
- Ben Broussard, 1B
- Ian Kinsler, 2B
- Hank Blalock, 3B
- Michael Young, SS
- David Murphy, LF
- Josh Hamilton, CF
- Marlon Byrd, RF
- Milton Bradley, DH
- Kevin Millwood, RHP

=== Season standings ===
AL West
Team	W	L	Pct.	GB	Home	Road
Los Angeles Angels of Anaheim	100	62	.617	—	50‍–‍31	50‍–‍31
Texas Rangers	79	83	.488	21	40‍–‍41	39‍–‍42
Oakland Athletics	75	86	.466	24½	43‍–‍38	32‍–‍48
Seattle Mariners	61	101	.377	39	35‍–‍46	26‍–‍55

=== Record vs. opponents ===
2008 American League record Source: MLB Standings Grid – 2008
Team	BAL	BOS	CWS	CLE	DET	KC	LAA	MIN	NYY	OAK	SEA	TB	TEX	TOR	NL
Baltimore	–	6–12	4–5	4–4	4–3	5–3	3–6	3–3	7–11	0–5	8–2	3–15	4–5	6–12	11–7
Boston	12–6	–	4–3	5–1	5–2	6–1	1–8	4–3	9–9	6–4	6–3	8–10	9–1	9–9	11–7
Chicago	5–4	3–4	–	11–7	12–6	12–6	5–5	9–10	2–5	5–4	5–1	4–6	3–3	1–7	12–6
Cleveland	4–4	1–5	7–11	–	11–7	10–8	4–5	8–10	4–3	5–4	4–5	5–2	6–4	6–1	6–12
Detroit	3–4	2–5	6–12	7–11	–	7–11	3–6	7–11	4–2	3–6	7–3	3–4	6–3	3–5	13–5
Kansas City	3–5	1–6	6–12	8–10	11–7	–	2–3	6–12	5–5	6–3	7–2	3–5	2–7	2–5	13–5
Los Angeles	6–3	8–1	5–5	5–4	6–3	3–2	–	5–3	7–3	10–9	14–5	3–6	12–7	6–3	10–8
Minnesota	3–3	3–4	10–9	10–8	11–7	12–6	3–5	–	4–6	5–5	5–4	3–3	5–5	0–6	14–4
New York	11–7	9–9	5–2	3–4	2–4	5–5	3–7	6–4	–	5–1	7–2	11–7	3–4	9–9	10–8
Oakland	5–0	4–6	4–5	4–5	6–3	3–6	9–10	5–5	1–5	-	10–9	3–6	7–12	4–6	10–8
Seattle	2–8	3–6	1–5	5–4	3–7	2–7	5–14	4–5	2–7	9–10	–	3–4	8–11	5–4	9–9
Tampa Bay	15–3	10–8	6–4	2–5	4–3	5–3	6–3	3–3	7–11	6–3	4–3	–	6–3	11–7	12–6
Texas	5–4	1–9	3–3	4–6	3–6	7–2	7–12	5–5	4–3	12–7	11–8	3–6	–	4–4	10–8
Toronto	12–6	9–9	7–1	1–6	5–3	5–2	3–6	6–0	9–9	6–4	4–5	7–11	4–4	–	8–10

=== Game log ===
Legend
Rangers Win	Rangers Loss	Game postponed

2008 Game Log (79-83)
March (0-1)

#	Date	Opponent	Score/Box	Win	Loss	Save	Attendance	Record
1	March 31	@ Mariners	5–2	Green (1–0)	Millwood (0–1)	Putz (1)	46,334	0–1

April (10-17)

#	Date	Opponent	Score/Box	Win	Loss	Save	Attendance	Record
2	April 1	@ Mariners	5–4	Benoit (1–0)	Putz (0–1)	Wilson (1)	25,204	1–1
3	April 2	@ Mariners	4–1	Silva (1–0)	Jennings (0–1)	Batista (1)	21,349	1–2
4	April 4	@ Angels	11–6	Gabbard (1–0)	Moseley (0–1)		43,838	2–2
5	April 5	@ Angels	2–1	Weaver (1–1)	Millwood (0–2)	Rodríguez (3)	41,170	2–3
6	April 6	@ Angels	10–4	Padilla (1–0)	Garland (1–1)		39,242	3–3
7	April 8	Orioles	8–1	Burres (1–0)	Jennings (0–2)		48,808	3–4
–	April 9	Orioles	Postponed (rain) Made up as a doubleheader April 10					
8	April 10	Orioles	3–1	Millwood (1–2)	Trachsel (1–1)	Wilson (2)		4–4
9	April 10	Orioles	5–4	Wright (1–0)	Bradford (0–1)	Wilson (3)	15,560	5–4
10	April 11	Blue Jays	8–5	Litsch (2–0)	Padilla (1–1)	Downs (1)	24,209	5–5
11	April 12	Blue Jays	4–1	Halladay (2–1)	Mendoza (0–1)		34,960	5–6
12	April 13	Blue Jays	5 – 4 (10)	Carlson (1–0)	Nippert (0–1)	Ryan (1)	21,515	5–7
13	April 14	Angels	7–4	Santana (2–0)	Jennings (0–3)	Rodríguez (4)	16,541	5–8
14	April 15	Angels	7–4	Oliver (1–0)	Rupe (0–1)	Rodríguez (5)	15,595	5–9
15	April 16	@ Blue Jays	7 – 5 (14)	Nippert (1–1)	Burnett (1–1)	Wilson (4)	15,686	6–9
16	April 17	@ Blue Jays	4–1	Padilla (2–1)	Halladay (2–2)	Wilson (5)	15,809	7–9
17	April 18	@ Red Sox	11–3	Matsuzaka (4–0)	Mendoza (0–2)		37,902	7–10
18	April 19	@ Red Sox	5–3	López (1–0)	Benoit (1–1)	Papelbon (6)	37,958	7–11
19	April 20	@ Red Sox	6–5	Wakefield (2–0)	Wilson (0–1)	Papelbon (7)	37,480	7–12
20	April 21	@ Red Sox	8–3	Buchholz (1–1)	Nippert (1–2)		37,539	7–13
21	April 22	@ Tigers	10–2	Verlander (1–3)	Padilla (2–2)		33,629	7–14
22	April 23	@ Tigers	19–6	Rapada (2–0)	Francisco (0–1)		34,245	7–15
23	April 24	@ Tigers	8–2	Miner (1–1)	Jennings (0–4)		39,058	7–16
24	April 25	Twins	6–5	Benoit (2–1)	Rincón (2–1)		19,016	8–16
25	April 26	Twins	12–6	Reyes (1–0)	Wright (1–1)		33,053	8–17
26	April 27	Twins	10–0	Padilla (3–2)	Hernández (3–1)		19,911	9–17
27	April 29	Royals	9–5	Mahay (1–0)	Jennings (0–5)		16,472	9–18
28	April 30	Royals	11–9	Millwood (2–2)	Bannister (3–2)		17,705	10–18

May (19-10)

#	Date	Opponent	Score/Box	Win	Loss	Save	Attendance	Record
29	May 1	Royals	2–1	Ponson (1–0)	Greinke (3–1)	Wilson (6)	14,563	11–18
30	May 2	@ Athletics	4–3	Padilla (4–2)	Blanton (2–5)	Wilson (7)	15,408	12–18
31	May 3	@ Athletics	6–3	Murray (1–0)	Gaudin (3–2)	Benoit (1)	20,524	13–18
32	May 4	@ Athletics	3–1	Casilla (1–0)	Feldman (0–1)	Street (9)	31,673	13–19
33	May 5	@ Mariners	7–3	Washburn (2–4)	Millwood (2–3)		16,637	13–20
34	May 6	@ Mariners	10–1	Ponson (2–0)	Batista (2–4)		15,818	14–20
35	May 7	@ Mariners	2–0	Padilla (5–2)	Bedard (2–2)	Wilson (8)	17,173	15–20
36	May 8	@ Mariners	5–0	Germán (1–0)	Hernández (2–3)		22,922	16–20
37	May 9	Athletics	4–0	Feldman (1–1)	Smith (2–2)		23,516	17–20
38	May 10	Athletics	6–4	Rupe (1–1)	Eveland (3–3)		22,899	18–20
39	May 11	Athletics	12–6	Casilla (2–0)	Germán (1–1)		23,959	18–21
40	May 12	Mariners	13 – 12 (10)	Mathis (1–0)	Morrow (0–1)		18,509	19–21
41	May 13	Mariners	5–2	Rupe (2–1)	Hernández (2–4)	Guardado (1)	15,766	20–21
42	May 14	Mariners	4 – 3 (12)	Putz (1–1)	Germán (1–2)	Washburn (1)	22,934	20–22
43	May 16	Astros	16–8	Wright (2–1)	Wright (3–1)		32,117	21–22
44	May 17	Astros	6–2	Padilla (6–2)	Oswalt (4–4)		38,534	22–22
45	May 18	Astros	5–4	Backe (2–5)	Gabbard (1–1)	Valverde (11)	33,561	22–23
46	May 19	@ Twins	7 – 6 (12)	Korecky (1–0)	Germán (1–3)		16,680	22–24
47	May 20	@ Twins	11–4	Perkins (1–1)	Mathis (1–1)		19,376	22–25
48	May 21	@ Twins	10–1	Ponson (3–0)	Blackburn (4–3)		22,032	23–25
49	May 22	@ Twins	8 – 7 (10)	Benoit (2–1)	Bass (1–1)	Wilson (9)	23,126	24–25
50	May 23	@ Indians	13–9	Loe (1–0)	Carmona (4–2)		39,947	25–25
51	May 24	@ Indians	5–2	Lee (7–1)	Feldman (1–2)	Borowski (3)	40,504	25–26
52	May 25	@ Indians	2 – 1 (10)	Wright (3–1)	Kobayashi (2–2)	Wilson (10)	35,464	26–26
53	May 26	@ Rays	7–3	Kazmir (4–1)	Ponson (3–1)		12,174	26–27
54	May 27	@ Rays	12–6	Padilla (7–2)	Sonnanstine (6–3)		10,511	27–27
55	May 28	@ Rays	5–3	Garza (4–1)	Gabbard (1–2)	Wheeler (1)	10,927	27–28
56	May 30	Athletics	3–1	Millwood (3–3)	Duchscherer (4–4)	Wilson (11)	21,763	28–28
57	May 31	Athletics	8–4	Ponson (4–1)	Blanton (3–7)		36,798	29–28

June (14-13)

#	Date	Opponent	Score/Box	Win	Loss	Save	Attendance	Record
58	June 1	Athletics	13–8	Gaudin (3–3)	Wright (3–2)		17,661	29–29
59	June 2	Indians	13–9	Kobayashi (3–2)	Guardado (0–1)		17,247	29–30
60	June 3	Indians	12–7	Francisco (1–1)	Mastny (0–1)		16,373	30–30
61	June 4	Indians	15–9	Lee (9–1)	Ramírez (0–1)		19,676	30–31
62	June 5	Indians	9–4	Millwood (4–3)	Sabathia (3–8)		17,795	31–31
63	June 6	Rays	12–4	Kazmir (6–1)	Padilla (7–3)		21,783	31–32
64	June 7	Rays	5–4	Howell (5–0)	Benoit (3–2)	Wheeler (2)	28,788	31–33
65	June 8	Rays	6–3	Mathis (2–1)	Garza (4–3)		20,258	32–33
66	June 10	@ Royals	6–5	Guardado (1–1)	Yabuta (1–1)	Wilson (12)	14,741	33–33
67	June 11	@ Royals	11–5	Padilla (8–3)	Gobble (0–2)		20,840	34–33
68	June 12	@ Royals	6–5	Mahay (2–0)	Francisco (1–2)	Soria (15)	15,515	34–34
69	June 13	@ Mets	7–1	Pérez (5–4)	Feldman (1–3)		49,880	34–35
–	June 14	@ Mets	Postponed (rain) Made up as a doubleheader June 15					
70	June 15	@ Mets	8–7	Millwood (5–3)	Maine (6–5)	Wilson (13)		35–35
71	June 15	@ Mets	4–2	Martínez (2–0)	Gabbard (1–3)	Wagner (14)	55,438	35–36
72	June 17	Braves	7–5	Padilla (9–3)	Hudson (7–5)	Wilson (14)	33,558	36–36
73	June 18	Braves	5–2	Bennett (1–4)	Wilson (0–2)	González (1)	38,545	36–37
74	June 19	Braves	5–4	Wright (4–2)	Boyer (1–5)		28,853	37–37
75	June 20	@ Nationals	4 – 3 (14)	Hanrahan (3–2)	Wright (4–3)		30,359	37–38
76	June 21	@ Nationals	13–3	Gabbard (2–3)	Mock (0–2)	Mendoza (1)	32,975	38–38
77	June 22	@ Nationals	5–3	Padilla (10–3)	Ayala (1–4)	Wilson (15)	32,690	39–38
78	June 24	@ Astros	4–3	Moehler (4–3)	Hurley (0–1)	Valverde (19)	40,052	39–39
79	June 25	@ Astros	3–2	Mendoza (1–2)	Oswalt (6–8)	Wilson (16)	32,567	40–39
80	June 26	@ Astros	7–2	Rodríguez (3–3)	Millwood (5–4)		36,506	40–40
81	June 27	Phillies	8–7	Rupe (3–1)	Condrey (1–1)	Wilson (17)	28,623	41–40
82	June 28	Phillies	8–6	Hamels (8–5)	Padilla (10–4)	Lidge (19)	28,623	41–41
83	June 29	Phillies	5–1	Hurley (1–1)	Moyer (7–6)		26,283	42–41
84	June 30	@ Yankees	2–1	Feldman (2–3)	Mussina (10–6)	Wilson (18)	53,045	43–41

July (13-12)

#	Date	Opponent	Score/Box	Win	Loss	Save	Attendance	Record
85	July 1	@ Yankees	3–2	Francisco (2–2)	Rivera (2–3)	Wilson (19)	53,223	44–41
86	July 2	@ Yankees	18–7	Ramírez (2–0)	Madrigal (0–1)		52,659	44–42
87	July 4	@ Orioles	10–4	Guthrie (5–7)	Padilla (10–5)		21,363	44–43
88	July 5	@ Orioles	5–3	Feldman (3–3)	Cormier (1–3)	Wilson (20)	19,006	45–43
89	July 6	@ Orioles	11–10	Millwood (6–4)	Liz (3–1)	Wilson (21)	22,276	46–43
90	July 7	Angels	9–6	Santana (10–3)	Mendoza (1–3)	Rodríguez (35)	21,170	46–44
91	July 8	Angels	3–2	Harrison (1–0)	Saunders (12–5)	Wilson (22)	18,788	47–44
92	July 9	Angels	5–4	Wright (5–3)	Rodríguez (0–2)		24,515	48–44
93	July 10	Angels	11 – 10 (11)	Speier (1–4)	Wright (5–4)	Rodríguez (36)	23,262	48–45
94	July 11	White Sox	7–2	Mendoza (2–3)	Floyd (10–5)	Guardado (2)	28,003	49–45
95	July 12	White Sox	9–7	Danks (7–4)	Millwood (6–5)		39,209	49–46
96	July 13	White Sox	12–11	Wright (6–4)	Logan (2–2)		28,459	50–46
97	July 18	@ Twins	6–0	Perkins (7–2)	Millwood (6–6)		30,134	50–47
98	July 19	@ Twins	14–2	Hernández (9–6)	Harrison (1–1)		35,085	50–48
99	July 20	@ Twins	1–0	Padilla (11–5)	Baker (6–3)	Wilson (22)	36,029	51–48
100	July 21	@ White Sox	6–1	Feldman (4–3)	Vázquez (7–8)		39,547	52–48
101	July 22	@ White Sox	10–2	Buehrle (8–8)	Mendoza (2–4)		32,670	52–49
102	July 23	@ White Sox	10–8	Dotel (4–4)	Guardado (1–2)	Jenks (19)	35,353	52–50
103	July 25	@ Athletics	14–6	Padilla (12–5)	Blevins (0–1)		20,141	53–50
104	July 26	@ Athletics	9–4	Harrison (2–1)	Duchscherer (10–7)		20,653	54–50
105	July 27	@ Athletics	6–5	Blevins (1–1)	Hurley (1–2)	Street (18)	21,135	54–51
106	July 28	Mariners	7–5	Green (3–3)	Francisco (2–3)	Morrow (10)	21,742	54–52
107	July 29	Mariners	11–10	Wilson (1–2)	Putz (2–4)		17,618	55–52
108	July 30	Mariners	4–3	Guardado (2–2)	Rhodes (2–1)	Wilson (24)	23,894	56–52
109	July 31	Mariners	8–5	Dickey (3–6)	Harrison (2–2)		17,839	56–53

August (11-18)

#	Date	Opponent	Score/Box	Win	Loss	Save	Attendance	Record
110	August 1	Blue Jays	9–8	Wilson (2–2)	Ryan (2–4)		23,973	57–53
111	August 2	Blue Jays	6–4	Burnett (13–9)	Feldman (4–4)	Ryan (21)	32,641	57–54
112	August 3	Blue Jays	8–4	Mendoza (3–4)	Purcey (1–2)		17,488	58–54
113	August 4	Yankees	9–5	Guardado (3–2)	Marte (4–1)		33,813	59–54
114	August 5	Yankees	8–6	Harrison (3–2)	Pettitte (12–9)	Guardado (3)	34,473	60–54
115	August 6	Yankees	5–3	Ponson (7–2)	Hunter (0–1)	Rivera (27)	38,638	60–55
116	August 7	Yankees	3–0	Mussina (15–7)	Feldman (4–5)	Rivera (28)	44,603	60–56
117	August 8	@ Orioles	9–1	Guthrie (9–8)	Mendoza (3–5)		33,351	60–57
118	August 9	@ Orioles	9–0	Cabrera (8–7)	Padilla (12–6)		30,914	60–58
119	August 10	@ Orioles	15–7	Harrison (4–2)	Bierd (0–2)		26,878	61–58
120	August 12	@ Red Sox	19–17	Okajima (3–2)	Francisco (2–4)	Papelbon (32)	38,004	61–59
121	August 13	@ Red Sox	8–4	Lester (11–4)	Mendoza (3–6)		37,876	61–60
122	August 14	@ Red Sox	9–3	Matsuzaka (14–2)	Hunter (0–2)		37,856	61–61
123	August 15	Rays	7–0	Garza (10–7)	Millwood (6–7)		20,233	61–62
124	August 16	Rays	3–0	Harrison (5–2)	Jackson (9–8)	Guardado (4)	29,238	62–62
125	August 17	Rays	7–4	Kazmir (9–6)	Nippert (1–3)	Wheeler (5)	18,363	62–63
126	August 18	Tigers	8–7	Rogers (9–10)	Francisco (2–5)	Rodney (5)	17,786	62-64
127	August 19	Tigers	11–3	Galarraga (12–4)	Padilla (12–7)		18,470	62-65
128	August 20	Tigers	9–1	Millwood (7–7)	Robertson (7-10)		19,403	63-65
129	August 22	Indians	7–5	Carmona (6–5)	Harrison (5–3)	Lewis (5)	20,535	63-66
130	August 23	Indians	8–7	Perez (3–3)	Wright (6–5)	Lewis (6)	29,900	63-67
131	August 24	Indians	4–3	Betancourt (3–4)	Guardado (3–3)		14,956	63-68
132	August 25	@ Royals	9-4	Feldman (5-5)	Meche (10-10)		12,399	64-68
133	August 26	@ Royals	2-1	Millwood (8-7)	R. Ramírez (2-2)		17,004	65-68
134	August 27	@ Royals	3-2	Harrison (6-3)	Bannister (7-14)	Francisco (1)	12,662	66-68
135	August 28	@ Angels	7–5	Garland (12–8)	Wright (6-6)	Rodríguez (51)	37,541	66-69
136	August 29	@ Angels	3–1	Santana (14–5)	Nippert (1–4)	Rodríguez (52)	40,084	66-70
137	August 30	@ Angels	4–3	Arredondo (7–1)	Feldman (5–6)	Rodríguez (53)	43,937	66-71
138	August 31	@ Angels	4–3	Millwood (9–7)	Lackey (11–3)	Francisco (2)	39,153	67-71

September (12-12)

#	Date	Opponent	Score/Box	Win	Loss	Save	Attendance	Record
139	September 1	Mariners	12–6	Green (4-4)	Mendoza (3-7)		16,171	67-72
140	September 2	Mariners	6–4	McCarthy (1-0)	Feierabend (0-2)	Francisco (3)	14,521	68-72
141	September 3	Mariners	1–0	Nippert (2-4)	Hernández (9-9)	Francisco (4)	12,882	69-72
142	September 5	Red Sox	8–1	Beckett (12–9)	Millwood (9–8)		30,264	69-73
143	September 6	Red Sox	15–8	Harrison (7–3)	Wakefield (8–10)		38,208	70-73
144	September 7	Red Sox	7–2	Byrd (11–11)	McCarthy (1–1)		28,644	70-74
145	September 9	@ Mariners	7–3	Padilla (13-7)	Hernández (9-10)	Madrigal (1)	22,704	71-74
146	September 10	@ Mariners	8-7	Corcoran (5-0)	Millwood (9-9)	Putz (13)	23,644	71-75
147	September 11	@ Athletics	6–1	Nippert (3–4)	Braden (5–4)		10,566	72-75
148	September 12	@ Athletics	7–0	Harrison (8–3)	Smith (7–15)		15,117	73-75
149	September 13	@ Athletics	7–1	Outman (1–0)	Feldman (5–7)		21,102	73-76
150	September 14	@ Athletics	7–4	Devine (6–1)	Madrigal (0–2)	Ziegler (9)	18,551	73-77
151	September 15	Tigers	11–8	Francisco (3–5)	Farnsworth (2–3)		13,536	74-77
152	September 16	Tigers	5–4	Wright (7-6)	Rodney (0–6)		14,659	75-77
153	September 17	Tigers	17–4	García (1-0)	Nippert (3–5)		17,808	75-78
154	September 19	Angels	15–13	Oliver (6–1)	Wright (7–7)	Shields (3)	23,708	75-79
155	September 20	Angels	7–3	Speier (2–8)	Padilla (13–8)	Rodríguez (60)	38,973	75-80
156	September 21	Angels	7–3	Lackey (12–4)	Feldman (5–8)		28,390	75-81
157	September 22	Athletics	4–3 (11)	Embree (2–4)	Mendoza (3–8)	Casilla (2)	14,925	75-82
158	September 23	Athletics	6–4	Wright (8–7)	Embree (2–5)	Francisco (5)	18,408	76-82
159	September 24	Athletics	14–4	Harrison (9–3)	Eveland (9–9)		16,832	77-82
160	September 26	@ Angels	12–1	Padilla (14–8)	Lackey (12–5)		43,758	78-82
161	September 27	@ Angels	8–4	Feldman (6–8)	Santana (16–7)		43,141	79-82
162	September 28	@ Angels	7–0	Saunders (17–7)	Millwood (9–10)		43,761	79-83

=== Roster ===
2008 Texas Rangers
Roster
Pitchers: 53 Joaquín Benoit; 65 Joselo Díaz; 39 Scott Feldman; 50 Frank Francisco; 14 Kazuo Fukumori; 13 Kason Gabbard; 54 Franklyn Germán; 52 Brian Gordon; 18 Eddie Guardado; 54 Matt Harrison; 35 Tommy Hunter; 37 Eric Hurley; 31 Jason Jennings; 58 Wes Littleton; 43 Kameron Loe; 60 Warner Madrigal; 49 Doug Mathis; 20 Brandon McCarthy; 46 Luis Mendoza; 33 Kevin Millwood; 47 A. J. Murray; 57 Dustin Nippert; 44 Vicente Padilla; 35 Sidney Ponson; 47 Elizardo Ramírez; 59 Josh Rupe; 55 Robinson Tejeda; 56 Bill White; 36 C. J. Wilson; 45 Jamey Wright	Catchers: 15 Gerald Laird; 2 Adam Melhuse; 51 Max Ramírez; 25 Jarrod Saltalamacchia; 2 Taylor Teagarden; Infielders: 4 Joaquin Arias; 9 Hank Blalock; 29 Jason Botts; 23 Ben Broussard; 27 Frank Catalanotto; 19 Chris Davis; 6 Germán Durán; 5 Ian Kinsler; 30 Travis Metcalf; 16 Chris Shelton; 12 Ramón Vázquez; 10 Michael Young	Outfielders: 41 Brandon Boggs; 21 Milton Bradley; 22 Marlon Byrd; 17 Nelson Cruz; 16 Jason Ellison; 32 Josh Hamilton; 7 David Murphy; Other batters: 14 Ryan Roberts	Manager: 38 Ron Washington; Coaches: 48 Jim Colborn (bullpen); 40 Andy Hawkins (pitching); 11 Art Howe (bench); 8 Rudy Jaramillo (hitting); 24 Gary Pettis (first base); 3 Matt Walbeck (third base)

== Player stats ==
=== Batting ===
==== Starters by position ====
Note: Pos = Position; G = Games played; AB = At bats; H = Hits; Avg. = Batting average; HR = Home runs; RBI = Runs batted in

Pos	Player	G	AB	H	Avg.	HR	RBI
C	Gerald Laird	95	344	95	.276	6	41
1B	Chris Davis	80	295	84	.285	17	55
2B	Ian Kinsler	121	518	165	.319	18	71
SS	Michael Young	155	645	183	.284	12	82
3B	Ramón Vázquez	105	300	87	.290	6	40
LF	Brandon Boggs	101	283	64	.226	8	41
CF	Josh Hamilton	156	624	190	.304	32	130
RF	David Murphy	108	415	114	.275	15	74
DH	Milton Bradley	126	414	133	.321	22	77

==== Other batters ====
Note: G = Games played; AB = At bats; H = Hits; Avg. = Batting average; HR = Home runs; RBI = Runs batted in

Player	G	AB	H	Avg.	HR	RBI
Marlon Byrd	122	403	120	.298	10	53
Hank Blalock	65	258	74	.287	12	38
Frank Catalanotto	88	248	68	.274	2	21
Jarrod Saltalamacchia	61	198	50	.253	3	26
Germán Durán	60	143	33	.231	3	16
Nelson Cruz	31	115	38	.330	7	26
Joaquín Arias	32	110	32	.291	0	9
Chris Shelton	41	97	21	.216	2	11
Ben Broussard	26	82	13	.159	3	8
Travis Metcalf	23	56	13	.232	6	14
Taylor Teagarden	16	47	15	.319	6	17
Max Ramírez	17	46	10	.217	2	9
Jason Botts	15	38	6	.158	2	5
Adam Melhuse	8	20	4	.200	0	1
Jason Ellison	9	13	3	.231	0	2
Ryan Roberts	1	1	0	.000	0	0

=== Pitching ===
==== Starting pitchers ====
Note: G = Games pitched; IP = Innings pitched; W = Wins; L = Losses; ERA = Earned run average; SO = Strikeouts

Player	G	IP	W	L	ERA	SO
Vicente Padilla	29	171.0	14	8	4.74	127
Kevin Millwood	29	168.2	9	10	5.07	125
Scott Feldman	28	151.1	6	8	5.29	74
Matt Harrison	15	83.2	9	3	5.49	42
Kason Gabbard	12	56.0	2	3	4.82	33
Sidney Ponson	9	55.2	4	1	3.88	25
Jason Jennings	6	27.1	0	5	8.56	12
Eric Hurley	5	24.2	1	2	5.47	13
Brandon McCarthy	5	22.0	1	1	4.09	10
Tommy Hunter	3	11.0	0	2	16.36	9
A.J. Murray	2	7.2	1	0	3.52	5

==== Other pitchers ====
Note: G = Games pitched; IP = Innings pitched; W = Wins; L = Losses; ERA = Earned run average; SO = Strikeouts

Player	G	IP	W	L	ERA	SO
Dustin Nippert	20	71.2	3	5	6.40	55
Luis Mendoza	25	63.1	3	8	8.67	35
Doug Mathis	8	22.1	2	1	6.85	9

==== Relief pitchers ====
Note: G = Games pitched; W = Wins; L = Losses; SV = Saves; ERA = Earned run average; SO = Strikeouts

Player	G	W	L	SV	ERA	SO
C.J. Wilson	50	2	2	24	6.02	41
Jamey Wright	75	8	7	0	5.12	60
Frank Francisco	58	3	5	5	3.13	83
Eddie Guardado	55	3	3	4	3.65	28
Josh Rupe	46	3	1	0	5.14	53
Joaquin Benoit	44	3	2	1	5.00	43
Warner Madrigal	31	0	2	1	4.75	22
Franklyn Germán	17	1	3	0	2.08	15
Kameron Loe	14	1	0	0	3.23	20
Wes Littleton	12	0	0	0	6.00	14
Bill White	8	0	0	0	20.25	1
Rob Tejeda	4	0	0	0	9.00	4
Kazuo Fukumori	4	0	0	0	20.25	1
Brian Gordon	3	0	0	0	2.25	1
Elizardo Ramírez	1	0	1	0	30.38	1
Joselo Díaz	1	0	0	0	0.00	2

== Farm system ==
Level	Team	League	Manager
AAA	Oklahoma RedHawks	Pacific Coast League	Bobby Jones
AA	Frisco RoughRiders	Texas League	Scott Little
A	Bakersfield Blaze	California League	Damon Berryhill
A	Clinton LumberKings	Midwest League	Mike Micucci
A-Short Season	Spokane Indians	Northwest League	Tim Hulett
Rookie	AZL Rangers	Arizona League	Bill Richardson

LEAGUE CHAMPIONS: Spokane
