= 2009 Texas Rangers season =

2009 Texas Rangers
- League: American League
- Division: West
- Ballpark: Rangers Ballpark in Arlington
- City: Arlington
- Record: 87–75 (.537)
- Divisional place: 2nd
- Owners: Tom Hicks
- General managers: Jon Daniels
- Managers: Ron Washington
- Television: Fox Sports Southwest; KDFI, channel 27 (MyNetworkTV); KDFW, channel 4 (Fox); Tom Grieve, Josh Lewin
- Radio: KRLD 105.3 FM (Weekdays); KRLD 1080 AM (Weekends); Eric Nadel, Dave Barnett

The 2009 Texas Rangers season was the 49th of the Texas Rangers franchise overall, their 38th in Arlington as the Rangers, and their 16th season at Rangers Ballpark in Arlington.

2009 signified the continuation of a strategy implemented by General Manager Jon Daniels in the summer of 2007. The plan to improve the club emphasized the acquisition and development of prospective talent within the Rangers' organization. Several young players such as shortstop Elvis Andrus, outfielder Julio Borbon, and pitchers Derek Holland and Tommy Hunter made their big league debuts in 2009 after spending time in the Rangers' minor league system. Ranked as the #1 farm system by Baseball America prior to the start of the season, the organization began the season with several of its heralded prospects still in the minor leagues. Emergence of these prospects on the Major League level gave the franchise and its fan base a brighter hope for the future, in line with the objective of competing for the American League West title in 2010 and beyond.

Notable performances from several core players as well as a well-coached pitching staff contributed to a greatly improved record and allowed the Rangers to compete for the division and wild card playoff berths well into the final weeks of the season. The Rangers finished the season with an 87–75 record, clinching their first winning season since 2004.

== Preseason ==
- Pitching coach Mark Connor was replaced by Mike Maddux, who worked with team president Nolan Ryan at his first coaching job with the Houston AA affiliate. Maddux joined the Rangers in November after declining to continue his time with the Milwaukee Brewers.
- Veteran infielder Michael Young moved from shortstop to third base, the third time in his career he had been asked to change positions. Young initially balked at the request after winning a Gold Glove at shortstop in 2008, and asked to be traded rather than move over. He eventually accepted the front office's decision after speaking with team president Nolan Ryan and remained with the team, making the 2009 A.L. All-Star team in his first year at third base.
- 1B/3B Hank Blalock's $6.2 million contract option was exercised by the club in November.
- C Gerald Laird was traded to Detroit for RHP prospects Guillermo Moscoso and Carlos Melo. The move made Jarrod Saltalamacchia the starting catcher and allowed Taylor Teagarden to start the season as his backup.
- INF Omar Vizquel, OF/DH Andruw Jones, and RHP Kris Benson signed minor league contracts during the offseason and earned places on the active roster to begin the season.
- Free agent RHP Ben Sheets signed a 2-year deal with the Rangers but he failed the physical after it was discovered his torn flexor tendon would require surgery, preventing him from joining a team in 2009.
- RHPs Joaquín Benoit and Eric Hurley began the season on the 60-day D.L. following surgery. Neither pitcher would recover in time for the 2009 season.

== Regular season ==
=== Opening day starters ===
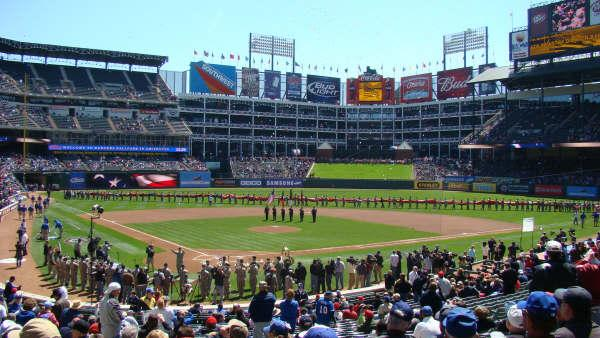
Opening Day at Rangers Ballpark, April 6, 2009

- Jarrod Saltalamacchia, C
- Chris Davis, 1B*
- Ian Kinsler, 2B
- Michael Young, 3B
- Elvis Andrus, SS*
- Marlon Byrd, LF
- Josh Hamilton, CF
- Nelson Cruz, RF
- Hank Blalock, DH
- Kevin Millwood, RHP

*Rookie

=== Season summary ===
==== April ====
Record: 10–11

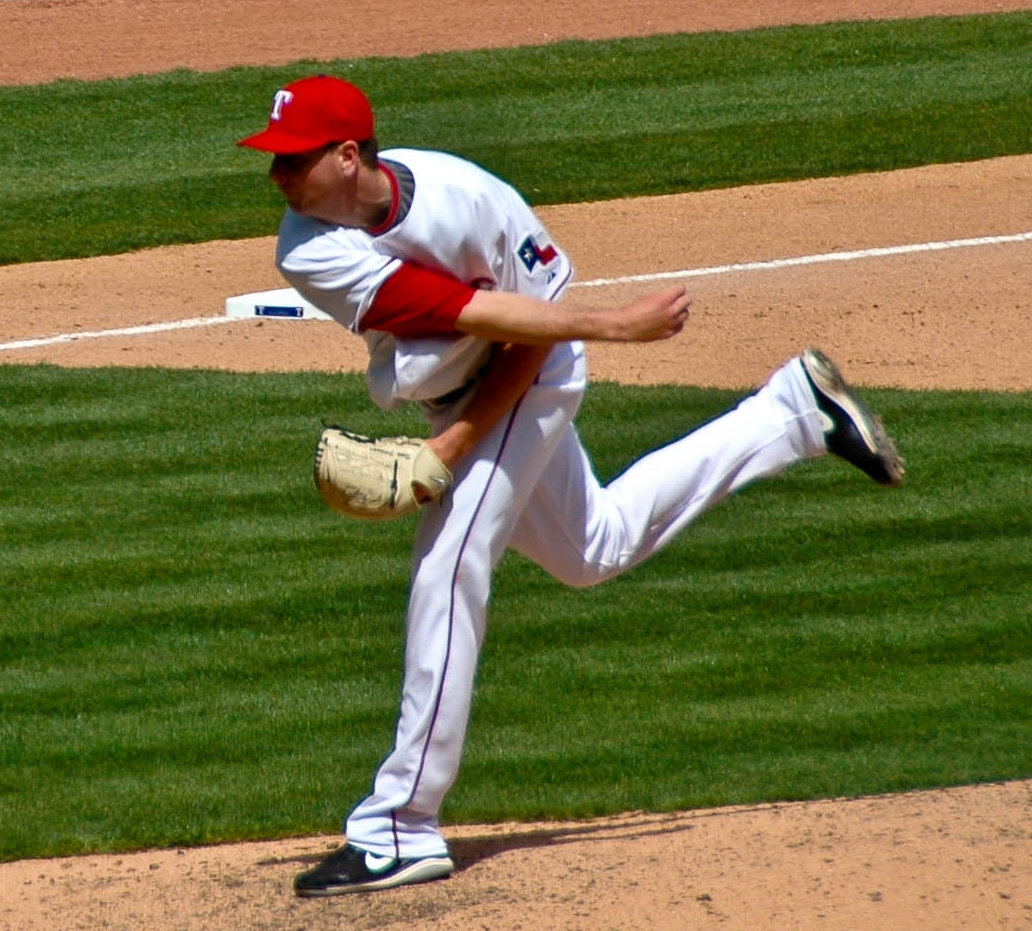
Scott Feldman

Starting Rotation: RHP Kevin Millwood, RHP Vicente Padilla, RHP Brandon McCarthy, RHP Kris Benson, LHP Matt Harrison, RHP Scott Feldman*

* spot starter

Opening day of the 2009 season saw the Rangers open the year at home for the first time in four years. In a 10–1 victory over the Cleveland Indians, the club roughed up reigning A.L. Cy Young winner Cliff Lee. A sweep of the Indians was quickly forgotten as the Rangers were swept by the Tigers in Detroit over the first weekend of the year. The Rangers dropped 5 games in a row before bouncing back in their last game against the Orioles on April 15. That day, MLB's "Jackie Robinson Day", 2B Ian Kinsler went 6-for-6 at the plate, hitting for the cycle. Kinsler became the fourth player to perform the feat in a Rangers uniform and the first player since 1890 to record a 6-hit cycle. The Rangers dropped the next two games at home to the Royals, and before Sunday's game many observers openly questioned manager Ron Washington's job security. In that game, the Rangers' oft-criticized bullpen recorded four scoreless innings in relief, allowing the lineup to rally in the 8th inning. In a 5–5 tie game, 3B Michael Young led off the bottom of the 9th inning with a 427-foot walk-off home run, the first of his career. Washington's position as manager appeared to be saved as the Rangers headed to Toronto, where they bested Blue Jays ace Roy Halladay in the first game. Game 2 of the series saw the Rangers debuts of LHP prospect Derek Holland and newly acquired RHP Darren O'Day. O'Day, who arrived in Toronto after first pitch, quickly joined the team at the stadium and was informed upon arrival that he would pitch that night. Wearing Kason Gabbard's #60 jersey, O'Day met his new manager, catcher, and teammates on the pitching mound in the 11th inning. O'Day would be credited with the loss after giving up the winning run. While in Toronto, CF Josh Hamilton made a diving catch against the wall in left-center, suffering the first of several injuries in 2009. The Rangers took 3 of 4 games from another series with the Orioles before ending the month against their first division opponent, the Oakland Athletics, splitting the 2-game set.

Transactions:

- April 5: 3B Travis Metcalf designated for assignment, claimed on April 8 by the Kansas City Royals.
- April 18: RHP Josh Rupe designated for assignment, later cleared waivers and assigned to extended spring training.
- April 22: RHP Darren O'Day claimed off waivers from the New York Mets.
- April 24: LHP Kason Gabbard traded to the Boston Red Sox for cash considerations.

==== May ====
Record: 20–9

Starting Rotation: Millwood, Padilla, McCarthy, Feldman, Harrison, LHP Derek Holland*, RHP Tommy Hunter*

*spot starter

The Rangers performed exceedingly well in the month of May, enjoying one of the best months in team history to date. The club quickly went 13–3, a stretch which saw the return (and subsequent re-injury) of Josh Hamilton, several superb outings by Matt Harrison, and mounting concern over the quality of 1B Chris Davis. Aside from two walk-off hits, the 23-year-old was batting .203 by the end of the month, a stark and inexplicable contrast to the breakout season he posted in 2008. Notable was a 3-game sweep of the division rival Los Angeles Angels in Arlington. Domination of each series over division opponents helped the Rangers reach first place in the American League West, and a record 10 games above .500 by the end of May. Young pitchers Tommy Hunter and Derek Holland each earned spot starts during May, each showing flashes of what could be achieved in the future.

Transactions: None.

==== June ====
Record: 11–15

Starting Rotation: Millwood, Padilla, McCarthy, Holland, Harrison, Hunter*

*spot starter

As the summer months began, the Rangers faltered. Vicente Padilla, an enigmatic presence in the clubhouse and a pitcher that previously led the majors in hit batsmen, was placed on outright waivers June 3. With very little explanation from the club, the Rangers essentially gave up their number two starter to anyone that would have him. Rumors about Padilla's negative attitude in the clubhouse abound, though the official party line was that management was disappointed with the way the right-handed handled adversity after a start the previous afternoon. Though Padilla cleared waivers, this issue would remain unresolved. In conjunction with the roster issues, a major power outage up and down the Rangers' lineup haunted the club throughout the month of June. On June 9, Josh Hamilton reportedly underwent surgery to repair an abdominal muscle, and RHP Brandon McCarthy was sent to the 15-day DL for shoulder issues. LHP Matt Harrison and closer Frank Francisco found themselves on the disabled list as well later into the month. These consistent injuries prevented any major gains in the standings. The last day of June saw the call-up of rookie OF Julio Borbon and the Rangers' lead on the A.L. West slowly dwindling as the second-place Angels encroached.

Transactions:

- June 3: RHP Vicente Padilla placed on outright waivers, cleared them, and rejoined the team.
- June 8: Manager Ron Washington's contract extended by front office through the 2010 season.
- June 26: INF Germán Durán placed on waivers, claimed by the Houston Astros.

==== July ====
Record: 17–8

Starting Rotation: Millwood, Padilla, Feldman, Hunter, Holland, RHP Dustin Nippert*, RHP Doug Mathis*

*spot starter

DH Hank Blalock drilled a walk-off home run on the evening of July 1 against the Angels, the beginning of a month in which the Rangers would bounce back from a dreadful June. Rumors in the media continued to circulate about the club's finances, including one that suspected Major League Baseball was loaning money to Hicks Sports Group in order to pay its debts and continue team operations. A great deal of speculation surrounded the Rangers' ability to acquire talent through trades due to a financial impasse. In part due to the return of OF Josh Hamilton on July 6, 1B Chris Davis was optioned to AAA to allow him to work out his issues at the plate. Davis, known for his defensive prowess at first base, failed to continue improving at the Major League level. Hank Blalock was given the first base job for the time being. On the 9th in Anaheim, California, OF/DH Andruw Jones hit 3 home runs in a game, essentially the highlight of an otherwise unspectacular season for the veteran. At the All-Star break, the Rangers remained in control of the A.L. West. Representing the team at the 2009 All-Star Game in St. Louis were 3B Michael Young, OF Josh Hamilton, and RF Nelson Cruz, who like Hamilton in 2008, earned second place in the Home Run Derby. By July 20, the club was 49–41 overall as closer Frank Francisco returned to the DL with pneumonia and several other players miss time late in the month due to bouts with the flu. With the trade deadline looming at the end of the month, the Toronto Blue Jays were assumed to be interested in trading their ace, RHP Roy Halladay, and Rangers observers began speculating on whether or not the club should make a bid. Many felt that a fair trade could be headlined by LHP Derek Holland. As talks reportedly heated up between the teams and an agreement was close, on the eve of deadline day Holland took the mound against Seattle and threw 8 2/3 scoreless innings (4 2/3 perfect innings), allowing only one hit. Halladay and Holland would remain with their respective teams for the time being.

Transactions:

- July 7: RHP Dustin Nippert activated from the 60-day disabled list; RHP Brandon McCarthy (shoulder) transferred to the 60-day D.L.
- July 25: LHP Matt Harrison (Thoracic Outlet Syndrome) transferred from the 15-day D.L. to the 60-day D.L.

==== August ====
Record: 14–15

Starting Rotation: Millwood, Padilla, Feldman, Holland, Hunter, Nippert*

*spot starter

The Rangers traveled to Oakland, precipitating the call-up of RHP Neftalí Feliz from AAA Oklahoma City for the first time. Feliz came out of the bullpen to debut in relief on the night of August 3 and immediately struck out 5 of his first 6 batters faced in two innings of work, his fastball averaging 98.8 mph and maxing out at 100.5 mph. Despite the A's walk-off win that night, Feliz easily secured his place on the big league club. On offense, similar struggles experienced in June seemingly returned to the Rangers in the dog days of the season and many critics pointed to tenured hitting coach Rudy Jaramillo, known for his aggressive philosophy. A surprising development on August 8 occurred when number two starter Vicente Padilla was designated for assignment. After his placement on waivers in June, Padilla's issues with teammates and the front office had not been smoothed over and following a particularly poor start against Oakland, the team decided to end its relationship with the Nicaraguan right-hander.

This was a culmination of events over time...We’re putting together an organization that pulls together, that stands for something. We intend to have a team in every sense of the word. When one guy doesn’t take that to heart, it is apparent. It's not about throwing at batters in specifics. It was about not being a good teammate.

— Jon Daniels, August 8, 2009

Around the same date, photographs of OF Josh Hamilton surfaced on Deadspin.com, showing him visibly intoxicated at an Arizona bar with various women. Hamilton, whose long struggle and recovery from substance abuse was well documented in the public eye, admitted to relapsing in January 2009 and acknowledged that he notified his family and Rangers officials immediately thereafter. Hamilton remembered little of the night, but a drug test several days later came up negative. The weekend of August 15 saw the Boston Red Sox arrive in Arlington tied with the Rangers for the A.L. Wild Card berth. After rallying on Friday night in the top of the 9th inning against closer Frank Francisco, the Rangers stormed back on Saturday. In that game, Neftalí Feliz earned his first Major League save, and on Sunday afternoon the Rangers won the series as Francisco successfully converted the save. C Jarrod Saltalamacchia went on the 15-day D.L. with symptoms of Thoracic Outlet Syndrome, leaving Taylor Teagarden as the only catcher on the roster. Career minor-leaguer C Kevin Richardson was called up for the first time to spell Teagarden, while the front office worked a deal to re-acquire former Ranger Iván Rodríguez.

The financial issues often quietly mentioned in the media finally erupted on August 17 when the Rangers were unable to sign 2009 first-round draft pick LHP Matt Purke, who opted to attend college and pitch for Texas Christian University. Purke's representatives reportedly asked for a contract close to $4 million, but the club was unable to accept such terms. The Purke affair confirmed the fears of many Rangers fans that the front office's ability to improve the team was restricted by Hicks Sports Group's large debts.

With injuries taking their toll once again, the Rangers found themselves in second place in the West at the end of August, losing 6 of 10 heading into September.

Transactions:

- August 8: RHP Vicente Padilla designated for assignment, later placed on irrevocable release waivers and claimed by the Los Angeles Dodgers.
- August 19: C Iván Rodríguez acquired from the Houston Astros in exchange for minor-leaguers INF Jose Vallejo and RHP Matt Nevarez
- August 27: RHP Jason Jennings designated for assignment and placed on waivers.

==== September ====
Record: 13–15

Starting Rotation: Millwood, Feldman, Holland, Hunter, McCarthy, Nippert*

*spot starter

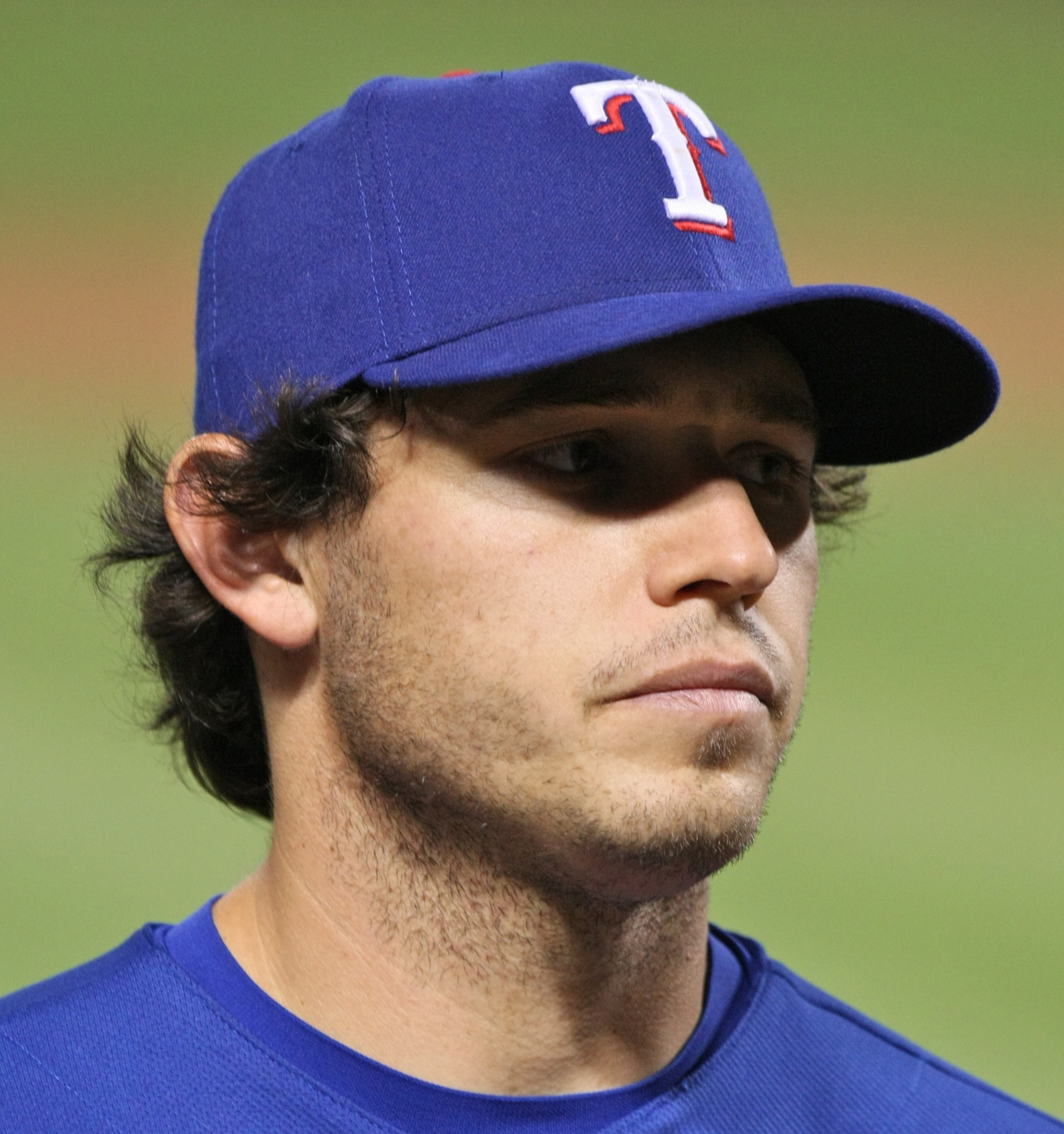
Ian Kinsler

In the second game of a double-header on September 1, Michael Young strained his left hamstring running out an infield single. The injury sidelined the veteran leader for 2–3 weeks, an omen that the Rangers chances to make the playoffs were shrinking. With the ballclub 4 1/2 games back of the Angels on September 6 and the performance of staff ace Kevin Millwood unravelling, the Rangers got another bit of bad news when it was reported that Josh Hamilton would be out indefinitely with a pinched nerve in his back. The team pressed hard and generally did little to improve its place in the standings throughout September, and questions concerning the future ownership of the Rangers heated up as playoff potential cooled. Groups under Pittsburgh attorney Chuck Greenberg, Houston businessman Jim Crane, and sports agent Dennis Gilbert quickly became known amongst fans as the three main factions jockeying for rights to negotiate with Hicks Sports Group. The emergence of these prospective owners set the stage for a long, complex battle of attrition for ownership of the franchise over the next eleven months. Despite the team's fading hopes, Ian Kinsler joined the "30-30 club" by hitting his 30th home run on September 25 after stealing 30 bases in 2009. On September 27, the Angels clinched the A.L. West championship after defeating Texas 11–0 in Anaheim. Though a slim chance to win the A.L. Wild Card still lingered, this would not be achieved and the Texas Rangers would miss the postseason for the tenth year in a row.

Transactions:

- September 3: RHP prospect Danny Gutierrez acquired from the Royals for minor leaguers C Manny Piña and OF Tim Smith

==== October ====
Record: 2–2

Starting Rotation: Millwood, Holland, Hunter, Feldman

The season would end in October due to certain schedule oddities. The majority of concerns by the end of the regular season surrounded the multitude of arbitration-eligible players on the roster and securing key pieces of the team for the 2010 season. The Rangers ended their season after a 4–3 loss in Seattle at the hands of Cy Young candidate Félix Hernández.

Transactions: None.

== 2009 roster and statistics ==
=== Roster ===
2009 Texas Rangers
Roster
Pitchers: 37 Kris Benson; 55 Willie Eyre; 39 Scott Feldman; 30 Neftalí Feliz; 50 Frank Francisco; 49 Jason Grilli; 18 Eddie Guardado; 54 Matt Harrison; 45 Derek Holland; 35 Tommy Hunter; 28 Jason Jennings; 60 Warner Madrigal; 52 Doug Mathis; 20 Brandon McCarthy; 46 Luis Mendoza; 33 Kevin Millwood; 58 Guillermo Moscoso; 57 Dustin Nippert; 56 Darren O'Day; 44 Vicente Padilla; 59 Josh Rupe; 64 Pedro Strop; 36 C. J. Wilson	Catchers: 61 Kevin Richardson; 7 Iván Rodríguez; 21 Jarrod Saltalamacchia; 2 Taylor Teagarden; Infielders: 1 Elvis Andrus; 3 Joaquín Árias; 9 Hank Blalock; 19 Chris Davis; 6 Esteban Germán; 5 Ian Kinsler; 13 Omar Vizquel; 10 Michael Young; Outfielders: 41 Brandon Boggs; 29 Julio Borbon; 22 Marlon Byrd; 17 Nelson Cruz; 68 Craig Gentry; 11 Greg Golson; 32 Josh Hamilton; 25 Andruw Jones; 7/14 David Murphy	Manager: 38 Ron Washington; Coaches: 16 Dave Anderson (third base); 40 Andy Hawkins (bullpen); 8 Rudy Jaramillo (hitting); 31 Mike Maddux (pitching); 4 Jackie Moore (bench); 73 Johnny Narron (coach); 24 Gary Pettis (first base)

=== Season standings ===
AL West
Team	W	L	Pct.	GB	Home	Road
Los Angeles Angels of Anaheim	97	65	.599	—	49‍–‍32	48‍–‍33
Texas Rangers	87	75	.537	10	48‍–‍33	39‍–‍42
Seattle Mariners	85	77	.525	12	48‍–‍33	37‍–‍44
Oakland Athletics	75	87	.463	22	40‍–‍41	35‍–‍46

=== Record vs. opponents ===
2009 American League record Source: MLB Standings Grid – 2009
Team	BAL	BOS	CWS	CLE	DET	KC	LAA	MIN	NYY	OAK	SEA	TB	TEX	TOR	NL
Baltimore	–	2–16	5–4	2–5	3–5	4–4	2–8	3–2	5–13	1–5	4–5	8–10	5–5	9–9	11–7
Boston	16–2	–	4–4	7–2	6–1	5–3	4–5	4–2	9–9	5–5	2–4	9–9	2–7	11–7	11–7
Chicago	4–5	4−4	–	10–8	9–9	9–9	5–4	6−12	3–4	4–5	4–5	6–2	2–4	1–6	12–6
Cleveland	5–2	2–7	8–10	–	4–14	10–8	2–4	8–10	3–5	2–5	6–4	5–3	1–8	4–4	5–13
Detroit	5–3	1–6	9–9	14–4	–	9–9	5–4	7–12	1–5	5–4	5–4	5–2	7–2	3–5	10–8
Kansas City	4–4	3–5	9–9	8–10	9–9	–	1–9	6–12	2–4	2–6	5–4	1–9	3–3	4–3	8–10
Los Angeles	8–2	5–4	4–5	4–2	4–5	9–1	–	6–4	5–5	12–7	10–9	4–2	8–11	4–4	14–4
Minnesota	2–3	2–4	12–6	10–8	12–7	12–6	4–6	–	0–7	4–6	5–5	3–3	6–4	3–5	12–6
New York	13–5	9–9	4–3	5–3	5–1	4–2	5–5	7–0	–	7–2	6–4	11–7	5–4	12–6	10–8
Oakland	5–1	5–5	5–4	5–2	4–5	6–2	7–12	6–4	2–7	–	5–14	6–4	11–8	3–6	5–13
Seattle	5–4	4–2	5–4	4–6	4–5	4–5	9–10	5–5	4–6	14–5	–	5–3	8–11	3–4	11–7
Tampa Bay	10–8	9–9	2–6	3–5	2–5	9–1	2–4	3–3	7–11	4–6	3–5	–	3–6	14–4	13–5
Texas	5–5	7–2	4–2	8–1	2–7	3–3	11–8	4–6	4–5	8–11	11–8	6–3	–	5–5	9–9
Toronto	9–9	7–11	6–1	4–4	5–3	3–4	4–4	5–3	6–12	6–3	4–3	4–14	5–5	–	7–11

- Source: MLB Standings Grid – 2009

=== Game log ===
2009 Game Log: 87–75 (Home: 48–33; Away: 39–42)
April: 10–11

#	Date	Opponent	Score	Win	Loss	Save	Attendance	Record	Streak
1	April 6	Indians	9–1	Millwood (1–0)	Lee (0–1)		49,916	1–0	
2	April 8	Indians	8–5	Padilla (1–0)	Carmona (0–1)	Francisco (1)	22,829	2–0	
3	April 9	Indians	12–8	McCarthy (1–0)	Pavano (0–1)		14,672	3–0	
4	April 10	@ Tigers	15–2	Galarraga (1–0)	Benson (0–1)		44,588	3–1	
5	April 11	@ Tigers	4–3	Robertson (1–0)	Harrison (0–1)	Rodney (1)	28,693	3–2	
6	April 12	@ Tigers	6–4	Lyon (1–1)	Wilson (0–1)	Rodney (2)	18,905	3–3	
7	April 13	Orioles	10–9	Uehara (2–0)	Padilla (1–1)	Sherrill (3)	12,184	3–4	
8	April 14	Orioles	7–5 (10)	Johnson (1–0)	Guardado (0–1)		14,041	3–5	
9	April 15	Orioles	19–6	Benson (1–1)	Hendrickson (1–1)		17,539	4–5	
10	April 17	Royals	12–3	Meche (1–0)	Harrison (0–2)		24,062	4–6	
11	April 18	Royals	2–0	Greinke (3–0)	Millwood (1–1)		37,635	4–7	
12	April 19	Royals	6–5	Francisco (1–0)	Farnsworth (0–3)		27,635	5–7	
13	April 21	@ Blue Jays	5–4	McCarthy (2–0)	Halladay (3–1)	Francisco (2)	20,996	6–7	
14	April 22	@ Blue Jays	8–7 (11)	Frasor (3–0)	Wilson (0–2)		13,090	6–8	
15	April 23	@ Blue Jays	5–2	Richmond (2–0)	Millwood (1–2)	Downs (1)	15,487	6–9	
16	April 24	@ Orioles	5–4	Wilson (1–2)	Sherrill (0–1)	Francisco (3)	24,319	7–9	
17	April 25	@ Orioles	6–5	Feldman (1–0)	Hendrickson (1–3)	Francisco (4)	41,160	8–9	
18	April 26	@ Orioles	8–5	Báez (1–1)	Jennings (0–1)	Sherrill (4)	22,896	8–10	
19	April 27	@ Orioles	6–4	Harrison (1–2)	Albers (0–1)	Francisco (5)	10,621	9–10	
20	April 28	Athletics	5–4	Millwood (2–2)	Wuertz (1–1)	Francisco (6)	12,627	10–10	
	April 29	Athletics	Postponed						
21	April 30	Athletics	4–2	Braden (3–2)	Padilla (1–2)	Wuertz (1)	13,802	10–11	

May: 20–9

#	Date	Opponent	Score	Win	Loss	Save	Attendance	Record	Streak
22	May 1	White Sox	4–3	Buehrle (4–0)	Holland (0–1)	Jenks (6)	23,836	10–12	
23	May 2	White Sox	9–6	McCarthy (3–0)	Contreras (0–4)	Francisco (7)	26,673	11–12	
24	May 3	White Sox	5–1	Harrison (2–2)	Danks (2–2)		20,132	12–12	
25	May 4	@ Mariners	6–5	Millwood (3–2)	Hernández (4–1)	Francisco (8)	16,421	13–12	
26	May 5	@ Mariners	7–2 (10)	O'Day (1–0)	Stark (0–1)		19,810	14–12	
27	May 6	@ Athletics	3–2	Feldman (2–0)	Giese (0–3)	Francisco (9)	15,342	15–12	
28	May 7	@ Athletics	9–4	Cahill (1–2)	McCarthy (3–1)		13,702	15–13	
29	May 8	@ White Sox	6–0	Harrison (3–2)	Contreras (0–5)		21,326	16–13	
30	May 9	@ White Sox	3–2	Linebrink (1–1)	Millwood (3–3)	Jenks (7)	28,864	16–14	
31	May 10	@ White Sox	7–1	Padilla (2–2)	Colón (2–3)		25,844	17–14	
32	May 12	Mariners	7–1	Holland (1–1)	Lowe (0–1)		16,564	18–14	
33	May 13	Mariners	6–5 (11)	Wilson (2–2)	Morrow (0–2)		25,865	19–14	
34	May 14	Mariners	3–2	Harrison (4–2)	Morrow (0–3)		21,002	20–14	
35	May 15	Angels	10–8	Millwood (4–3)	Saunders (5–2)	Wilson (1)	33,429	21–14	
36	May 16	Angels	5–3	Padilla (3–2)	Loux (2–3)	Wilson (2)	34,284	22–14	
37	May 17	Angels	3–0	Jennings (1–1)	Weaver (3–2)	O'Day (1)	37,146	23–14	
38	May 19	@ Tigers	4–0	Willis (1–0)	McCarthy (3–2)		23,756	23–15	
39	May 20	@ Tigers	5–3	Verlander (4–2)	Harrison (4–3)	Rodney (7)	23,417	23–16	
40	May 21	@ Tigers	4–3	Jackson (4–2)	Millwood (4–4)	Rodney (8)	34,356	23–17	
41	May 22	@ Astros	6–5 (10)	O'Day (2–0)	Hawkins (1–2)	Francisco (10)	36,017	24–17	
42	May 23	@ Astros	6–3	Feldman (3–0)	Moehler (1–3)	Wilson (3)	36,019	25–17	
43	May 24	@ Astros	5–0	McCarthy (4–2)	Hampton (2–4)		36,749	26–17	
44	May 25	Yankees	11–1	Hughes (3–2)	Harrison (4–4)		48,914	26–18	
45	May 26	Yankees	7–3	Jennings (2–1)	Aceves (3–1)		33,397	27–18	
46	May 27	Yankees	9–2	Burnett (3–2)	Holland (1–2)		38,409	27–19	
47	May 29	Athletics	6–3	Wilson (3–2)	Casilla (1–2)	Francisco (11)		28–19	
48	May 29	Athletics	5–2	Feldman (4–0)	González (0–1)	Wilson (4)	30,496	29–19	
49	May 30	Athletics	14–1	McCarthy (5–2)	Anderson (2–5)		45,325	30–19	
50	May 31	Athletics	5–4	Bailey (4–0)	Francisco (1–1)		22,952	30–20	

June: 11–15

#	Date	Opponent	Score	Win	Loss	Save	Attendance	Record	Streak
51	June 2	@ Yankees	12–3	Burnett (4–2)	Padilla (3–3)		43,948	30–21	
52	June 3	@ Yankees	4–2	Feldman (5–0)	Pettitte (5–2)	Francisco (12)	44,452	31–21	
53	June 4	@ Yankees	8–6	Robertson (1–0)	Wilson (3–3)	Rivera (12)	45,713	31–22	
54	June 5	@ Red Sox	5–1	Millwood (5–4)	Penny (5–2)		37,519	32–22	
55	June 6	@ Red Sox	8–1	Lester (5–5)	Holland (1–3)		37,828	32–23	
56	June 7	@ Red Sox	6–3	Padilla (4–3)	Matsuzaka (1–4)	Wilson (5)	37,537	33–23	
57	June 8	Blue Jays	6–3	Janssen (2–2)	Feldman (5–1)	Downs (8)	17,856	33–24	
58	June 9	Blue Jays	9–0	Tallet (4–3)	Mathis (0–1)		17,535	33–25	
	June 10	Blue Jays	Postponed						
59	June 11	Blue Jays	1–0	Millwood (6–4)	Romero (3–3)	Wilson (6)	16,073	34–25	
60	June 12	Dodgers	6–0	Padilla (5–3)	Kuroda (1–2)		36,591	35–25	
61	June 13	Dodgers	3–1	Wade (2–3)	Grilli (0–2)	Broxton (15)	37,262	35–26	
62	June 14	Dodgers	6–3	Billingsley (9–3)	Holland (1–4)	Broxton (16)	36,343	35–27	
63	June 16	Astros	6–1	Millwood (7–4)	Rodríguez (5–6)		21,676	36–27	
64	June 17	Astros	5–4 (10)	Wilson (4–3)	Fulchino (2–2)		32,425	37–27	
65	June 18	Astros	5–3	Árias (1–0)	Jennings (2–2)	Valverde (3)	25,445	37–28	
66	June 19	@ Giants	6–4	Romo (1–0)	Feldman (5–2)	Wilson (18)	31,241	37–29	
67	June 20	@ Giants	2–1 (11)	Romo (2–0)	Jennings (2–3)		33,312	37–30	
68	June 21	@ Giants	3–2	Zito (4–7)	Millwood (7–5)	Wilson (19)	41,292	37–31	
69	June 23	@ D-backs	8–2	Scherzer (5–4)	Harrison (4–5)		21,379	37–32	
70	June 24	@ D-backs	2–1	Padilla (6–3)	Haren (6–5)	Wilson (7)	20,031	38–32	
71	June 25	@ D-backs	9–8 (12)	Guardado (1–1)	Vásquez (1–2)		19,376	39–32	
72	June 26	Padres	12–2	Millwood (8–5)	Silva (0–1)		33,340	40–32	
73	June 27	Padres	7–3	Correia (5–5)	Holland (1–5)		25,410	40–33	
74	June 28	Padres	2–0	Gaudin (4–6)	Hunter (0–1)	Bell (21)	27,000	40–34	
75	June 29	Angels	5–2	O'Sullivan (2–0)	Padilla (6–4)	Fuentes (22)	16,985	40–35	
76	June 30	Angels	9–5	Feldman (6–2)	Saunders (8–5)		20,042	41–35	

July: 17–8

#	Date	Opponent	Score	Win	Loss	Save	Attendance	Record	Streak
77	July 1	Angels	9–7	Francisco (2–1)	Speier (3–2)		27,142	42–35	
78	July 3	Rays	3–1	Hunter (1–1)	Kazmir (4–5)	Francisco (13)	39,123	43–35	
79	July 4	Rays	12–4	Holland (2–5)	Price (2–3)		43,809	44–35	
80	July 5	Rays	5–2	Feldman (7–2)	Garza (6–6)	Francisco (14)	22,324	45–35	
81	July 6	@ Angels	9–4	Weaver (9–3)	Millwood (8–6)		35,691	45–36	
82	July 7	@ Angels	8–5	Holland (3–5)	Lackey (3–4)		42,088	46–36	
83	July 8	@ Angels	8–1	Padilla (7–4)	Santana (1–5)		37,364	47–36	
84	July 9	@ Mariners	3–1	Hernández (9–3)	Wilson (4–4)	Aardsma (18)	24,823	47–37	
85	July 10	@ Mariners	6–4	Feldman (8–2)	Morrow (0–4)	Francisco (15)	34,874	48–37	
86	July 11	@ Mariners	4–1	Washburn (6–6)	Millwood (8–7)	Aardsma (19)	30,698	48–38	
87	July 12	@ Mariners	5–3	Batista (6–3)	O'Day (2–1)	Aardsma (20)	33,220	48–39	
88	July 17	Twins	5–3	Perkins (5–5)	Padilla (7–5)	Nathan (24)	34,662	48–40	
89	July 18	Twins	4–1	Baker (8–7)	Feldman (8–3)	Nathan (25)	31,041	48–41	
90	July 19	Twins	5–3 (12)	Nippert (1–0)	Duensing (0–1)		27,204	49–41	
91	July 20	Red Sox	6–3	Millwood (9–7)	Smoltz (1–3)	Wilson (8)	28,916	50–41	
92	July 21	Red Sox	4–2	Hunter (2–1)	Beckett (11–4)	Wilson (9)	28,555	51–41	
93	July 22	Red Sox	3–1	Nippert (2–0)	Buchholz (1–1)	Mathis (1)	39,778	52–41	
94	July 24	@ Royals	2–0	Feldman (9–3)	Greinke (10–6)	Wilson (10)	25,012	53–41	
95	July 25	@ Royals	6–3	Hochevar (6–3)	Holland (3–6)	Soria (15)	27,602	53–42	
96	July 26	@ Royals	7–2	Nippert (3–0)	Mahay (1–1)		16,847	54–42	
97	July 27	Tigers	5–2	Hunter (3–1)	Galarraga (5–9)	Wilson (11)	17,173	55–42	
98	July 28	Tigers	7–3	Grilli (1–2)	French (1–2)		21,615	56–42	
99	July 29	Tigers	13–5	Verlander (12–5)	Feldman (9–4)		33,235	56–43	
100	July 30	Mariners	7–1	Holland (4–6)	Olson (3–5)		23,949	57–43	
101	July 31	Mariners	5–4	Padilla (8–5)	Vargas (3–5)	Wilson (12)	36,901	58–43	

August: 14–15

#	Date	Opponent	Score	Win	Loss	Save	Attendance	Record	Streak
102	August 1	Mariners	7–2	Hernández (12–4)	Hunter (3–2)		29,458	58–44	
103	August 2	Mariners	4–2	Feldman (10–4)	White (2–2)	Wilson (13)	28,670	59–44	
104	August 3	@ Athletics	3–2	Wuertz (6–1)	Wilson (4–5)		10,523	59–45	
105	August 4	@ Athletics	6–0	González (3–2)	Holland (4–7)		10,781	59–46	
106	August 5	@ Athletics	7–5	Breslow (5–5)	Padilla (8–5)	Bailey (15)	20,560	59–47	
107	August 6	@ Athletics	6–4	Hunter (4–2)	Cahill (6–11)	Wilson (13)	17,214	60–47	
108	August 7	@ Angels	11–6	Feldman (11–4)	Saunders (9–7)		43,624	61–47	
109	August 8	@ Angels	3–2	Weaver (12–3)	Guardado (1–2)	Fuentes (31)	37,166	61–48	
110	August 9	@ Angels	7–0	Holland (5–7)	Lackey (7–5)		35,706	62–48	
111	August 11	@ Indians	5–0	Laffey (6–3)	Nippert (3–1)		21,870	62–49	
112	August 12	@ Indians	5–0	Hunter (5–2)	Carmona (2–7)		18,794	63–49	
113	August 13	@ Indians	4–1	Feldman (12–4)	Sowers (4–8)	Francisco (16)	20,090	64–49	
114	August 14	Red Sox	8–4	Saito (3–3)	Francisco (2–2)		40,311	64–50	
115	August 15	Red Sox	7–2	Holland (6–7)	Penny (7–7)	Feliz (1)	48,201	65–50	
116	August 16	Red Sox	4–3	Nippert (4–1)	Tazawa (1–2)	Francisco (17)	27,155	66–50	
117	August 17	Twins	8–5	Hunter (6–2)	Liriano (5–12)	Francisco (18)	17,940	67–50	
118	August 18	Twins	9–6	Crain (4–4)	Jennings (2–4)	Nathan (30)	20,931	67–51	
119	August 19	Twins	5–4	Baker (11–7)	Millwood (9–8)	Nathan (31)	33,479	67–52	
120	August 20	Twins	11–1	Holland (7–7)	Swarzak (3–7)		21,870	68–52	
121	August 21	@ Rays	5–3	Kazmir (8–7)	Nippert (4–2)	Howell (15)	20,639	68–53	
122	August 22	@ Rays	5–4 (10)	Balfour (5–2)	Grilli (1–3)		34,281	68–54	
123	August 23	@ Rays	4–0	Feldman (13–4)	Price (6–6)		29,101	69–54	
124	August 25	@ Yankees	10–9	Millwood (10–8)	Chamberlain (8–4)		46,511	70–54	
125	August 26	@ Yankees	9–2	Pettitte (11–6)	Holland (7–8)		46,461	70–55	
126	August 27	@ Yankees	7–2	Grilli (2–3)	Burnett (10–8)		47,209	71–55	
127	August 28	@ Twins	3–2	Duensing (2–1)	Hunter (6–3)	Nathan (33)	21,641	71–56	
128	August 29	@ Twins	3–0	Feldman (14–4)	Pavano (11–10)	Francisco (19)	28,516	72–56	
129	August 30	@ Twins	5–3	Rauch (1–0)	Wilson (4–6)	Nathan (34)	29,282	72–57	
130	August 31	Blue Jays	18–10	Cecil (6–3)	Holland (7–9)		16,675	72–58	

September: 13–15

#	Date	Opponent	Score	Win	Loss	Save	Attendance	Record	Streak
131	September 1	Blue Jays	5–2	Nippert (5–2)	Rzepczynski (2–4)	Francisco (20)		73–58	
132	September 1	Blue Jays	5–2	McCarthy (6–2)	Tallet (5–9)	Francisco (21)	17,203	74–58	
133	September 2	Blue Jays	6–4	Hunter (7–3)	Richmond (6–8)	Francisco (22)	21,836	75–58	
134	September 4	@ Orioles	5–1	Feldman (15–4)	Tillman (1–3)	Feliz (2)	15,557	76–58	
135	September 5	@ Orioles	5–4	Matusz (4–2)	Millwood (10–9)	Johnson (8)	18,028	76–59	
136	September 6	@ Orioles	7–0	Guthrie (10–13)	Holland (7–10)		21,599	76–60	
	September 7	@ Indians	Postponed						
137	September 8	@ Indians	11–9	Feliz (1–0)	Lewis (2–4)			77–60	
138	September 8	@ Indians	10–5	McCarthy (7–2)	Laffey (7–5)		12,976	78–60	
139	September 9	@ Indians	10–0	Feldman (16–4)	Carmona (3–10)		14,637	79–60	
	September 11	Mariners	Postponed						
140	September 12	Mariners	8–3	Morrow (1–4)	Millwood (10–10)		22,468	79–61	
141	September 13	Mariners	7–2	Hunter (8–3)	Fister (2–2)			80–61	
142	September 13	Mariners	5–0	Hernández (15–5)	Holland (7–11)		18,522	80–62	
143	September 14	Athletics	9–0	Tomko (5–3)	Feldman (16–5)		13,669	80–63	
144	September 15	Athletics	6–1	Breslow (7–7)	McCarthy (7–3)		15,964	80–64	
145	September 16	Athletics	4–0	Cahill (9–12)	Nippert (5–3)		23,372	80–65	
146	September 18	Angels	2–0	Kazmir (9–8)	Hunter (8–4)	Fuentes (43)	34,240	80–66	
147	September 19	Angels	3–2	Feldman (17–5)	Weaver (15–7)	Francisco (23)	46,596	81–66	
148	September 20	Angels	10–5	Lackey (11–8)	Holland (7–12)		33,688	81–67	
149	September 21	@ Athletics	10–3	Millwood (11–10)	González (0–3)		10,581	82–67	
150	September 22	@ Athletics	9–1	Cahill (10–12)	McCarthy (7–4)		10,475	82–68	
151	September 23	@ Athletics	9–8	Hunter (9–4)	Mortensen (2–3)	Francisco (24)	18,311	83–68	
152	September 24	@ Athletics	12–3	Anderson (11–10)	Feldman (17–6)		11,124	83–69	
153	September 25	Rays	8–3	Holland (8–12)	Shields (10–12)		29,232	84–69	
154	September 26	Rays	15–3	Millwood (12–10)	Garza (8–11)		31,855	85–69	
155	September 27	Rays	7–6	Choate (1–0)	Francisco (2–3)	Cormier (2)	37,905	85–70	
156	September 28	@ Angels	11–0	Santana (8–8)	Hunter (9–5)		40,484	85–71	
157	September 29	@ Angels	5–2	O'Sullivan (4–2)	Feldman (17–7)	Fuentes (46)	38,600	85–72	
158	September 30	@ Angels	5–0	Palmer (11–2)	Holland (8–13)		40,616	85–73	

October: 2–2

#	Date	Opponent	Score	Win	Loss	Save	Attendance	Record	Streak
159	October 1	@ Angels	11–3	Millwood (13–10)	Bell (1–2)		38,552	86–73	
160	October 2	@ Mariners	7–4	Wilson (5–6)	Aardsma (3–6)	Francisco (26)	27,899	87–73	
161	October 3	@ Mariners	2–1	Rowland-Smith (5–4)	Hunter (9–6)	Batista (1)	24,391	87–74	
162	October 4	@ Mariners	4–3	Hernández (19–5)	Feldman (17–8)	Aardsma (38)	32,26	87–75	

== Player statistics ==
=== Team leaders ===
Pitching

Starts	Innings Pitched	Strike Outs	Wins	Saves
Kevin Millwood (31) : Scott Feldman (31)	Kevin Millwood (198)	Kevin Millwood (123)	Scott Feldman (17)	Frank Francisco (25)

Batting

Batting Average	Home Runs	RBI	Runs	OPS
Michael Young (.322)	Nelson Cruz (33)	Marlon Byrd (89)	Ian Kinsler (101)	Michael Young (.892)

=== Batting ===
2009 Texas Rangers batting statistics at Baseball Reference

Note: Pos = Position; G = Games played; AB = At bats; R = Runs; H = Hits; HR = Home runs; RBI = Runs batted in; AVG = Batting average; SB = Stolen bases

Pos	Player	G	AB	R	H	HR	RBI	AVG	SB
SS	Elvis Andrus	145	480	72	128	6	40	.267	33
2B	Joaquin Arias	3	8	0	0	0	0	.000	0
DH	Hank Blalock	123	462	62	108	25	66	.240	2
OF	Brandon Boggs	9	17	0	1	0	0	.059	0
OF	Julio Borbon	46	157	30	49	4	20	.312	19
CF	Marlon Byrd	146	547	66	155	20	89	.283	8
RF	Nelson Cruz	128	462	75	120	33	76	.260	20
1B	Chris Davis	113	392	48	93	21	59	.238	0
OF	Craig Gentry	11	17	4	2	0	4	.118	0
3B	Esteban Germán	19	46	9	14	0	4	.304	1
CF	Greg Golson	1	1	0	0	0	0	.000	0
CF	Josh Hamilton	89	336	43	90	10	54	.268	8
DH	Andruw Jones	82	281	43	60	17	43	.217	5
2B	Ian Kinsler	144	566	101	143	31	86	.253	31
LF	David Murphy	128	432	61	116	17	57	.269	9
C	Kevin Richardson	4	6	2	3	0	0	.500	0
C	Iván Rodríguez	28	98	14	24	2	13	.245	1
C	Jarrod Saltalamacchia	84	283	34	66	9	34	.233	0
C	Taylor Teagarden	60	198	26	43	6	24	.217	0
IF	Omar Vizquel	62	177	17	47	1	14	.266	4
3B	Michael Young	135	541	76	174	22	68	.322	8
	Pitcher totals	162	20	1	0	0	0	.000	0
	Team totals	162	5526	784	1436	224	748	.260	149

=== Pitching ===
Note: G = Games; IP = Innings pitched; W = Wins; L = Losses; SV = Saves; ERA = Earned run average; H = Hits Allowed; BB = Walks Allowed; SO = Strikeouts

Player	G	IP	W	L	SV	ERA	H	BB	SO
Kris Benson	8	22.1	1	1	0	8.46	33	12	11
Willie Eyre	17	18.0	0	0	0	4.50	18	6	8
Scott Feldman	34	189.2	17	8	0	4.08	178	65	113
Neftalí Feliz	20	31.0	1	0	2	1.74	13	8	39
Frank Francisco	51	49.1	2	3	25	3.83	40	15	57
Jason Grilli	30	26.1	2	2	0	4.78	21	14	27
Eddie Guardado	48	38.1	1	2	0	4.46	39	15	20
Matt Harrison	11	63.1	4	5	0	6.11	81	23	34
Derek Holland	33	138.1	8	13	0	6.12	160	47	107
Tommy Hunter	19	112.0	9	6	0	4.10	113	33	64
Jason Jennings	44	61.0	2	4	1	4.13	67	28	44
Warner Madrigal	13	12.2	0	0	0	9.95	18	12	5
Doug Mathis	24	42.2	0	1	1	3.16	39	10	25
Brandon McCarthy	17	97.1	7	4	0	4.62	96	36	65
Luis Mendoza	1	1.0	0	0	0	36.00	2	1	0
Kevin Millwood	31	198.2	13	10	0	3.67	195	71	123
Guillermo Moscoso	10	14.0	0	0	0	3.21	15	6	12
Dustin Nippert	20	69.2	5	3	0	3.88	64	29	54
Darren O'Day	64	55.2	2	1	2	1.94	36	17	54
Vicente Padilla	18	108.0	8	6	0	4.92	120	42	59
Josh Rupe	4	4.2	0	0	0	15.43	12	5	2
Pedro Strop	7	7.0	0	0	0	7.71	6	4	9
C. J. Wilson	74	73.2	5	6	14	2.81	66	32	84
Team totals	162	1434.2	87	75	45	4.38	1432	531	1016

2009 Texas Rangers pitching statistics at Baseball Reference

== Scoring by inning ==
Stats updated through October 4.

INNING	1	2	3	4	5	6	7	8	9	10	11	12	TOTAL
RANGERS	93	83	98	102	117	92	74	66	42	10	2	5	784
OPPONENTS	73	78	71	110	76	111	95	59	56	6	3	2	740

== Game log summary ==
Stats updated through October 4.

Comeback Wins: 38, Largest Comeback: 4 runs

Blown Leads: 30, Largest Blown Lead: 5 runs

Walk-off Wins: 6

Walk-off Losses: 4

== Farm system ==
Level	Team	League	Manager
AAA	Oklahoma City RedHawks	Pacific Coast League	Bobby Jones
AA	Frisco RoughRiders	Texas League	Mike Micucci
A	Bakersfield Blaze	California League	Steve Buechele
A	Hickory Crawdads	South Atlantic League	Héctor Ortiz
A-Short Season	Spokane Indians	Northwest League	Tim Hulett
Rookie	AZL Rangers	Arizona League	Bill Richardson
