= Samuel W. Wolfson High School =

Samuel Wolfson School for Advanced Studies

Location
- 7000 Powers Avenue; Jacksonville, Florida, USA 32217; United States; 30.2509°N 81.6158°W

Information
- Type: Magnet School
- Motto: Committed to Excellence
- Established: 1965
- School district: Duval County Public Schools
- Principal: Christopher Begley January 16, 2017(present)
- Teaching staff: 46.00 (FTE)
- Grades: 9–12
- Enrollment: 1,007 (2024-2025)
- Student to teacher ratio: 21.89
- Campus size: 35.42 acres (14.33 ha)
- Campus type: Suburban
- Colors: Scarlet, white, and blue
- Mascot: Wolfpack
- Website: www.samuelwolfson.org

Samuel W. Wolfson High School, Samuel Wolfson School for Advanced Studies, or simply Wolfson, is a magnet high school located in the Duval County Public School district. As an academic magnet and college preparatory school, Wolfson specializes in Advanced Placement and International Baccalaureate courses. In addition to its academic focus, Samuel Wolfson School for Advanced Studies has an athletics program, a program for visual and performing arts, and a JROTC program. Its name is derived from Samuel W. Wolfson, a local businessman whose family was prominent in Jacksonville. Wolfson is a member of the International Baccalaureate Diploma Programme.

== Student body ==
The school is notable for its diverse student body. Wolfson's magnet program allows students from all over the district to attend via the AP program and the IB program.

== Notable alumni ==
- John Brecher (class of 1969), journalist, former wine columnist for The Wall Street Journal
- Billy Butler, MLB first baseman
- Mike Clevinger, MLB pitcher for the Chicago White Sox
- Amer Delic, professional tennis player
- Val Demings, U.S. Congresswoman representing Florida's 10th congressional district and former chief of police of the Orlando Police Department
- Ashley Greene, actress most recognized as Alice Cullen in Twilight
- Udonis Haslem, basketball player for the Miami Heat
- Eric Hurley, professional baseball player for the Minnesota Twins
- Jerry Storch, chairman and CEO, ToysRUs; CEO HBC/Saks Fifth Avenue; vice chairman, Target
