= Kevin Richardson (baseball) =

American baseball player (born 1980)

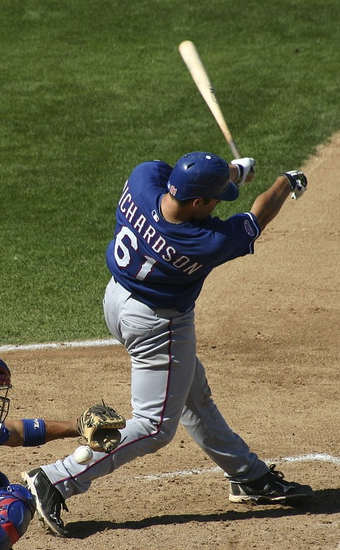
- Richardson with the Texas Rangers
- Catcher
- Born: September 12, 1980 (age 45); Mount Vernon, Washington
- Batted: Right Threw: Right

MLB debut
- August 17, 2009, for the Texas Rangers

Last MLB appearance
- September 26, 2009, for the Texas Rangers

MLB statistics
- Batting average: .500
- Home runs: 0
- Runs batted in: 0
- Stats at Baseball Reference

Teams
- Texas Rangers (2009)

Kevin Grant Richardson (born September 12, 1980) is an American former professional baseball catcher. He played in Major League Baseball (MLB) for the Texas Rangers in 2009.

== Baseball career ==
Richardson attended Gonzaga University, where he played college baseball for the Bulldogs from 2001-2002. Richardson was signed as an undrafted free agent by the Texas Rangers in 2002. He made his MLB debut against Francisco Liriano and the Minnesota Twins, going 2 for 4. Richardson appeared in four games for the Rangers in 2009, but was released by the club at the end of the season.

The Los Angeles Angels of Anaheim signed Richardson to a minor league contract with an invite to spring training on January 14, 2011. He played with the Triple-A Salt Lake Bees.
