= Frank Francisco =

Dominican baseball player (born 1979)

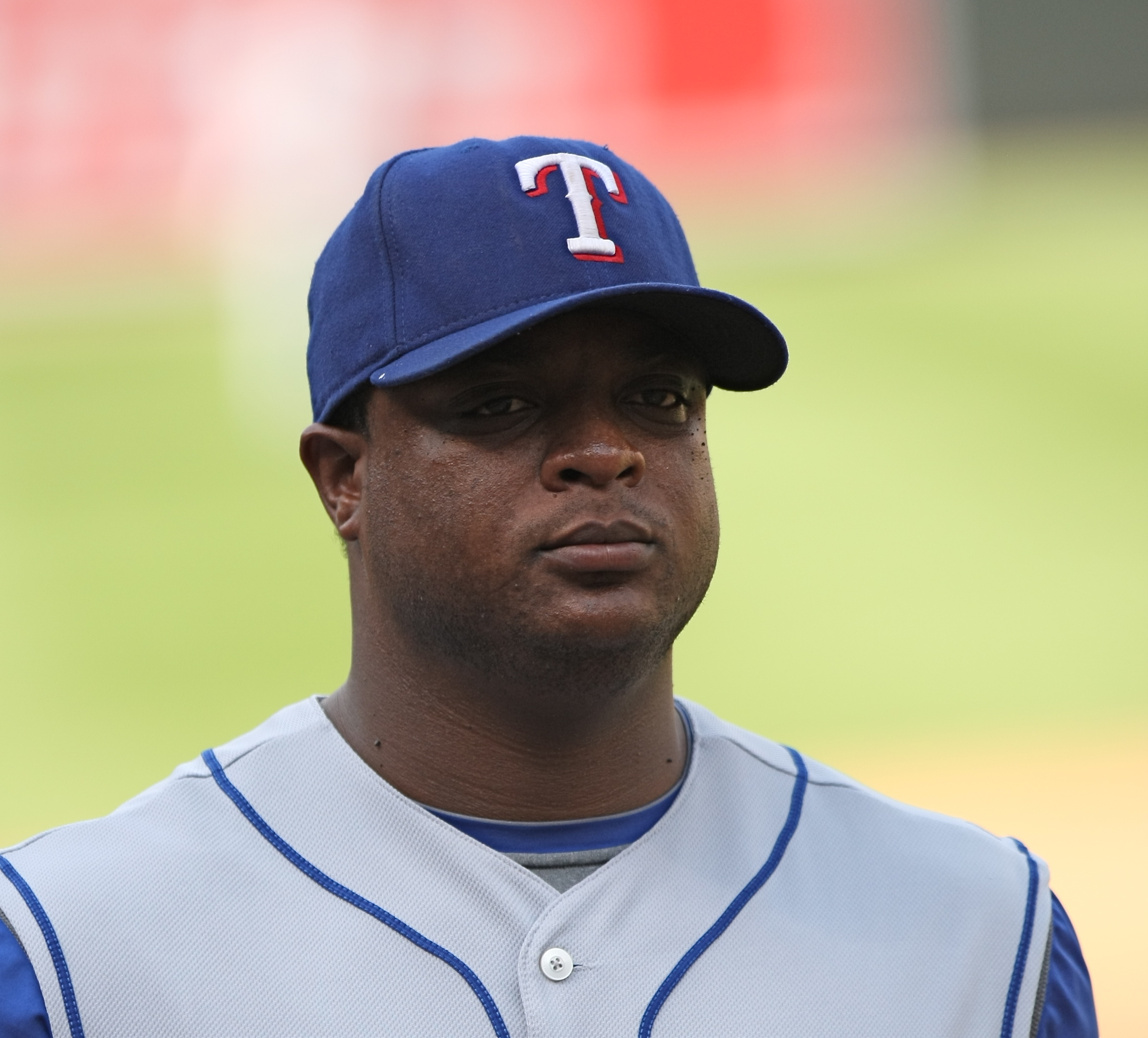
- Francisco with the Texas Rangers
- Relief pitcher
- Born: Franklin Thomas Francisco; September 11, 1979 (age 47); Santo Domingo, Dominican Republic
- Batted: Right Threw: Right

MLB debut
- May 14, 2004, for the Texas Rangers

Last MLB appearance
- May 20, 2014, for the Chicago White Sox

MLB statistics
- Win–loss record: 20–22
- Earned run average: 4.01
- Strikeouts: 426
- Saves: 73
- Stats at Baseball Reference

Teams
- Texas Rangers (2004, 2006–2010); Toronto Blue Jays (2011); New York Mets (2012–2013); Chicago White Sox (2014)

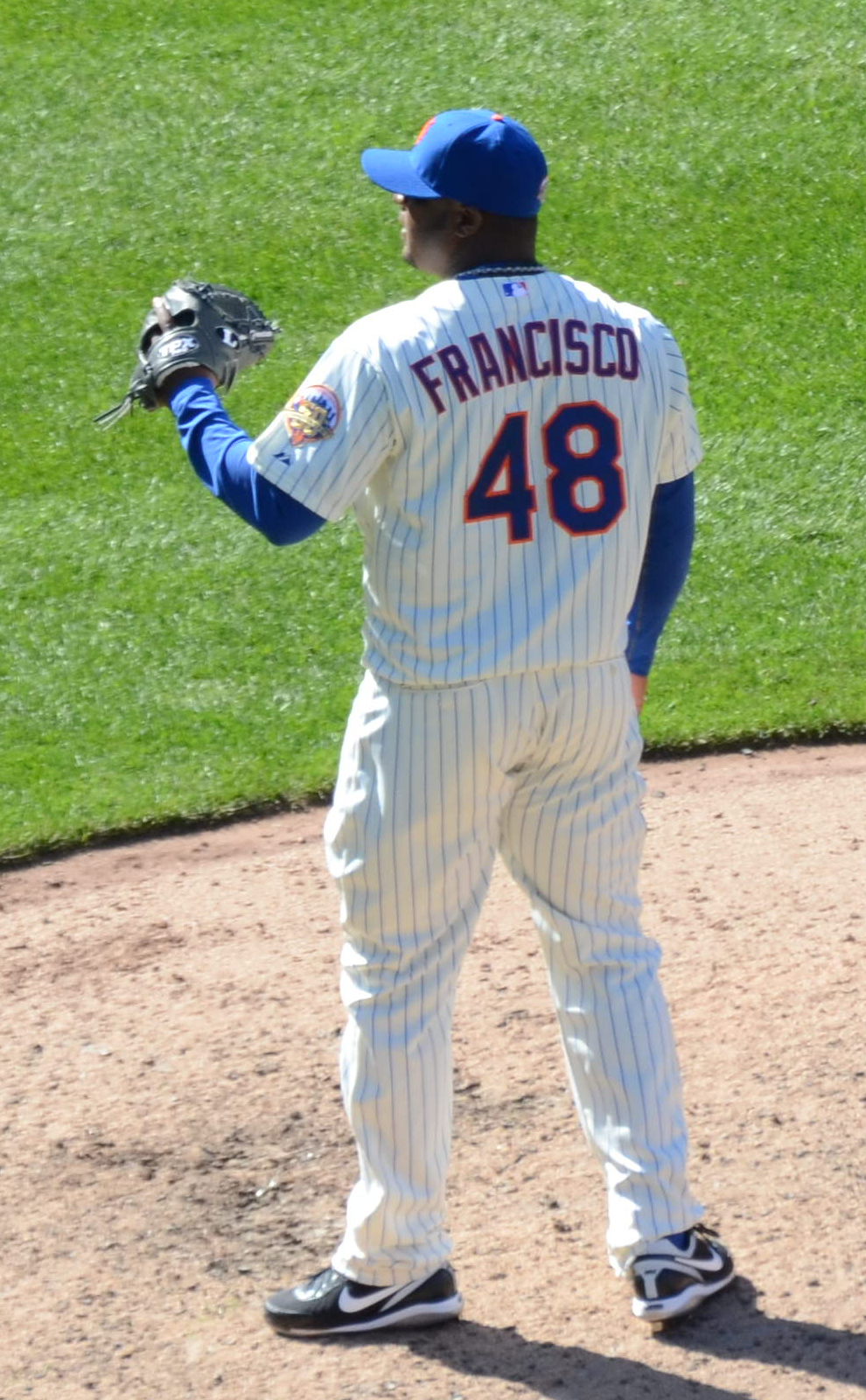
Francisco with the New York Mets

Franklin Thomas Francisco (born September 11, 1979) is a Dominican former professional baseball pitcher. He played in Major League Baseball (MLB) for the Texas Rangers, Toronto Blue Jays, New York Mets, and Chicago White Sox.

== Baseball career ==
Francisco was originally signed as an amateur free agent by the Boston Red Sox. He was traded by the Red Sox to the Chicago White Sox on July 31, 2002, along with Byeong Hak An, in exchange for reliever Bob Howry. On July 1, 2003, the White Sox acquired Carl Everett from the Texas Rangers in exchange for three players to be named later.

=== Texas Rangers ===
On July 25, 2003, Francisco, Josh Rupe, and minor leaguer Anthony Webster were sent to the Rangers to complete the trade.

Francisco is best known for participating in a notable incident involving fan violence. On September 13, 2004, he threw a folding chair into the crowd during a game against the Oakland Athletics. The incident initially escalated when Rangers pitcher Doug Brocail confronted a fan. Francisco, who was in the dugout when all this was happening in the bullpen, ran from the dugout to the bullpen and threw a folding chair into the crowd, hitting a female fan in the face, breaking her nose and causing a cut which required stitches. Francisco was arrested and on June 30, 2005, he pleaded no contest to the charges. He was sentenced to anger management classes and a work program. A civil suit brought by the woman who had been struck by the chair was settled on January 12, 2007. Terms of the settlement included an undisclosed payment and a public apology.

Francisco was suspended for the balance of the 2004 season, and missed the entire 2005 season after undergoing Tommy John surgery. Francisco rejoined the club on September 8, 2006.

After a poor spring training, Francisco started 2007 with the Rangers' Triple-A affiliate, the Oklahoma RedHawks. Following an injury to Éric Gagné in mid-April, Francisco was recalled to the majors. Francisco spent time in 2008 as the Rangers' closer after an injury to regular closer C. J. Wilson.

Francisco again began 2009 as the closer. He began with seven scoreless innings, allowing three hits and one walk, while garnering two saves. Through the end of April, Francisco maintained a 0.00 ERA with one walk and nine strikeouts, as well as six saves. He allowed his first run of 2009 on an upper-deck home run by Oakland Athletics' second baseman, Adam Kennedy.

Francisco and the Rangers agreed to a one-year contract of $3.265 million, thereby avoiding arbitration for the 2010 season.

Francisco lost the closer's role after blowing saves in his first two chances of the 2010 baseball season.

=== Toronto Blue Jays ===
On January 25, 2011, Francisco was traded to the Toronto Blue Jays in exchange for catcher Mike Napoli. On January 29, Francisco agreed to terms with the Blue Jays on a one-year contract. After a stint on the disabled list, Francisco made his debut as a Blue Jay on April 20. On his first pitch as a Blue Jay, Francisco gave up a home run to the New York Yankees' Curtis Granderson. He became a free agent following the season.

=== New York Mets ===
On December 6, 2011, Francisco agreed to a two-year contract worth $12 million with the New York Mets. Frank Francisco made his Mets debut on April 5, 2012 against the Atlanta Braves, and was named the Mets' closer for the 2012 season. On May 13, Francisco was ejected from a game against the Miami Marlins at Marlins Park after an outburst towards the home plate umpire. On June 23, after a save against the New York Yankees, Francisco was placed on the 15-day disabled list after feeling soreness in his oblique muscle. Before he began a rehabilitation assignment to come off the DL, Francisco aggravated his injury. On August 22, Francisco showed frustration by hurling a cooler in the dugout after giving up two runs in the top of the ninth inning. On December 18, Francisco had surgery to remove a bone spur from his right elbow.

On May 30, 2013, Francisco was moved to the 60-day disabled list to make room on the 40-man roster for shortstop Omar Quintanilla. He became a free agent following the season.

=== Chicago White Sox ===
On April 14, 2014, the White Sox signed Francisco to a minor league contract, and assigned him to the Triple-A Charlotte Knights. On April 17, when Frank De Los Santos was transferred from the Birmingham Barons, Francisco was transferred to the rookie-level Pioneer League team, the Great Falls Voyagers. On May 10, the White Sox purchased his contract from Charlotte and brought him up to the major leagues. He was designated for assignment on May 22. Francisco cleared waivers and was assigned outright to Charlotte on May 24. Francisco refused the assignment and became a free agent.

=== Toronto Blue Jays (second stint) ===
On June 20, 2014, Francisco signed a minor league contract with the Toronto Blue Jays. He was released on July 14, after not appearing in a game for the organization.
