= Travis Metcalf =

American baseball player

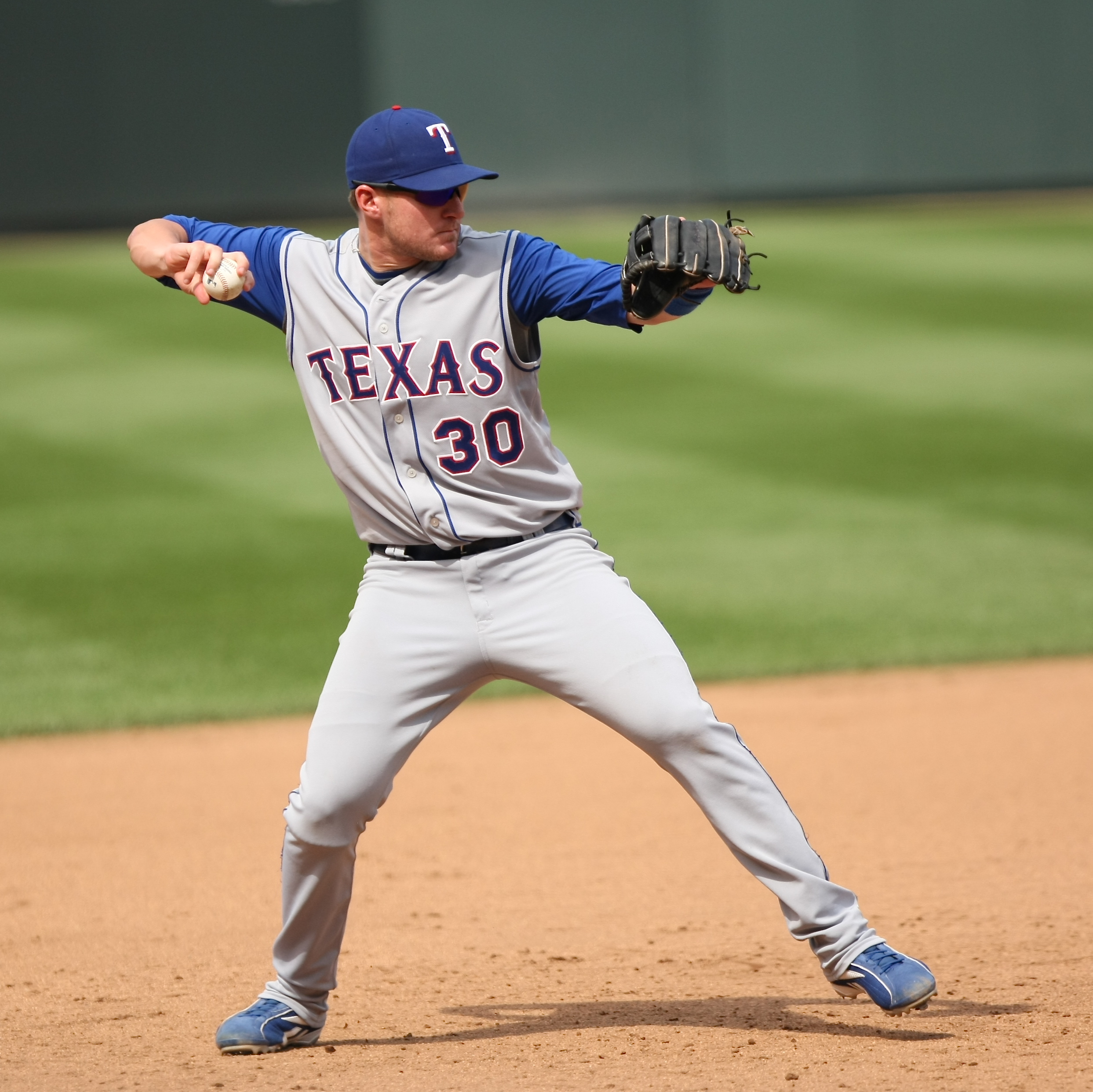
- Metcalf with the Texas Rangers in 2008
- Third baseman
- Born: August 17, 1982 (age 43); Manhattan, Kansas, U.S.
- Batted: Right Threw: Right

MLB debut
- May 19, 2007, for the Texas Rangers

Last MLB appearance
- September 26, 2008, for the Texas Rangers

MLB statistics
- Batting average: .249
- Home runs: 11
- Runs batted in: 35
- Stats at Baseball Reference

Teams
- Texas Rangers (2007–2008)

Travis Anthony Metcalf (born August 17, 1982) is an American former professional baseball third baseman. He played parts of two seasons in Major League Baseball (MLB) for the Texas Rangers.

== Amateur career ==
He helped lead the Wamego Red Raider baseball program in Wamego to the Kansas 4A State Championship in 2000, his senior year at Wamego High School. Metcalf holds the career home run record at the University of Kansas with 29 and held the single season record (18) from 2003 to 2009.

== Professional career ==
=== Minor leagues ===
Metcalf was drafted by the Texas Rangers in the 11th round of the 2004 Major League Baseball draft. He spent two and a half years in Texas' minor league system, playing for the Spokane Indians, Bakersfield Blaze, Frisco RoughRiders, and Oklahoma RedHawks, before his contract was purchased by the Rangers on May 18, 2007.

=== Defense first ===
Metcalf is known more for his defensive prowess than his offensive accomplishments. Rangers then-Assistant General Manager Thad Levine said Metcalf "was ready to play in the major leagues" in 2005. His offense rebounded in 2007 and the Rangers at that point felt that Metcalf would be able to adequately fill in for the injured Hank Blalock.

=== Major league career ===
Metcalf made his major league debut on May 19, 2007, against the Houston Astros. His first major league hit was a home run off Pirates pitcher, and former teammate at Kansas, Tom Gorzelanny. That August, he drove in four runs in each game of a doubleheader at Baltimore, the first game being a record-setting 30–3 rout.

=== Back to the minors ===
Following the Rangers' 2009 spring training camp, Metcalf was returned to the Triple-A Oklahoma RedHawks. On April 5, Metcalf was designated for assignment. He was claimed off waivers by the Kansas City Royals on April 8.

On August 19, 2009, Metcalf was released by the Kansas City Royals but re-signed with the Texas Rangers and was optioned to their Triple-A affiliate, the Oklahoma City Redhawks just 3 days later.

On February 23, 2010, Metcalf signed a minor league contract with the Colorado Rockies and played the 2010 season with the Colorado Rockies Triple-A affiliate, the Colorado Springs Sky Sox.

On April 27, 2011, Metcalf signed an independent league contract with the Fort Worth Cats. He was let go by the Cats later in the season and was picked up by the Lancaster Barnstormers.
