= Josh Rupe =

American baseball player (born 1982)

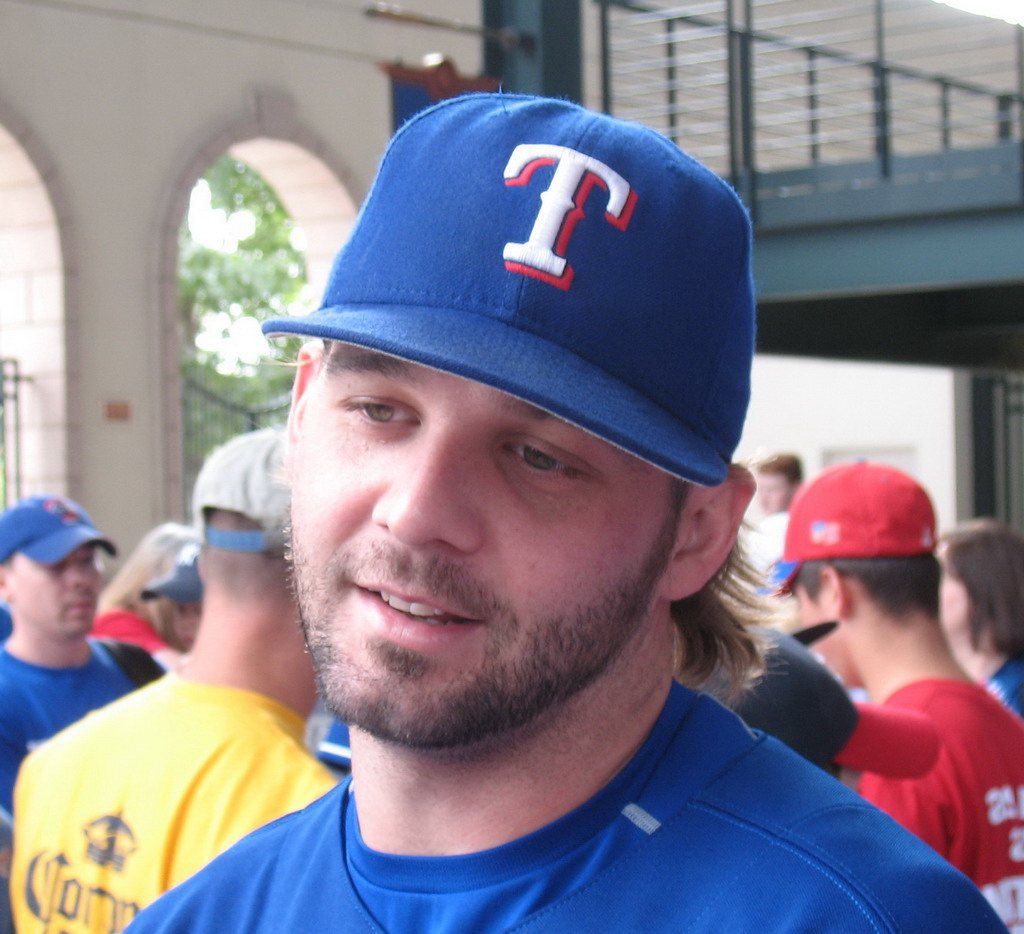
- Rupe with the Texas Rangers
- Relief pitcher
- Born: August 18, 1982 (age 44); Portsmouth, Virginia, U.S.
- Batted: Right Threw: Right

MLB debut
- September 16, 2005, for the Texas Rangers

Last MLB appearance
- May 5, 2011, for the Baltimore Orioles

MLB statistics
- Win–loss record: 5–3
- Earned run average: 5.06
- Strikeouts: 90
- Stats at Baseball Reference

Teams
- Texas Rangers (2005–2006, 2008–2009); Kansas City Royals (2010); Baltimore Orioles (2011)

Joshua Matthew Rupe (born August 18, 1982) is an American former professional baseball relief pitcher. He played in Major League Baseball (MLB) for the Texas Rangers, Kansas City Royals, and Baltimore Orioles.

== Career ==
=== Chicago White Sox ===
Rupe was drafted by the Chicago White Sox in the 3rd round, with the 90th overall selection, of the 2002 Major League Baseball draft out of Louisburg College. He made his professional debut with the rookie-level Bristol White Sox, posting a 3-3 record and 5.26 ERA with 40 strikeouts in 17 games. Rupe began the 2003 campaign with the Single-A Kannapolis Intimidators, registering a 5-5 record and 3.02 ERA with 69 strikeouts and 6 saves in 65 2/3 innings pitched across 26 games.

=== Texas Rangers ===
Rupe was acquired by the Texas Rangers along with Frank Francisco and Anthony Webster to complete an earlier trade for Carl Everett on July 25, 2003.

On September 16, 2005, Rupe was promoted to the major leagues for the first time. In 4 games during his rookie campaign, he recorded a 2.79 ERA with 6 strikeouts across 9 2/3 innings pitched.

Early in the 2006 season, Rupe was placed on the 60-day disabled list due to an inflamed left elbow. Upon his recovery, he spent time rehabbing with the Triple-A Oklahoma RedHawks. Rupe was promoted to the major leagues on July 28, 2006, and finished the season working out of the bullpen in a middle relief role. In 16 total appearances, Rupe compiled an 0-1 record and 3.41 ERA with 14 strikeouts over 29 innings of work.

Rupe failed to make the big league roster to start the 2007 season, and was optioned to the RedHawks. In 9 starts split between Oklahoma City and the rookie-level Arizona League Rangers, he accumulated a 2-2 record and 4.28 ERA with 23 strikeouts over 40 innings of work. Rupe made 46 appearances out of the bullpen for Texas during the 2008 season, playing a 3-1 record and 5.14 ERA with 53 strikeouts across 89 1/3 innings pitched. Rupe's innings total in 2008 would tie J.P. Howell for the most relief innings pitched for the 2008 regular season.

Rupe pitched in 4 games for the Rangers in 2009, struggling to a 15.43 ERA with 2 strikeouts across 4 2/3 innings pitched. On April 18, 2009, Rupe was designated for assignment by the Rangers. He cleared waivers and was sent outright to Triple-A Oklahoma City on April 28. Rupe elected free agency following the season on November 9.

=== Kansas City Royals ===
On November 25, 2009, Rupe signed a minor league contract with the Kansas City Royals. On April 16, 2010, the Royals selected Rupe's contract, adding him to their active roster. In 11 appearances for Kansas City, he compiled a 1-1 record and 5.59 ERA with 8 strikeouts across 9 2/3 innings pitched. Rupe was designated for assignment following the promotion of Blake Wood on May 12. He cleared waivers and was sent outright to the Triple-A Omaha Storm Chasers two days later. Rupe elected free agency on October 5.

=== Baltimore Orioles ===
On November 29, 2010, Rupe signed a minor league contract with the Baltimore Orioles. On March 30, 2011, the Orioles selected Rupe's contract after he made the team's Opening Day roster. In 9 appearances for Baltimore, he logged a 5.65 ERA with 7 strikeouts across 14 1/3 innings pitched. Rupe was designated for assignment by the Orioles on May 10. He cleared waivers and was sent outright to the Triple-A Norfolk Tides on May 12. Rupe was released by the Orioles organization on August 5.

=== Somerset Patriots ===
Rupe signed with the Somerset Patriots of the Atlantic League of Professional Baseball for the 2012 season. In 28 relief appearances for the Patriots, he compiled a 2-4 record and 2.73 ERA with 25 strikeouts and 15 saves over 33 innings of work. Rupe became a free agent following the season.

== Personal ==
He is married to April Winfree Rupe and has two sons and a daughter.
