= Germán Durán =

Mexican-American baseball player (born 1984)

- Third baseman
- Born: August 3, 1984 (age 42); Zacatecas, Mexico
- Batted: Right Threw: Right

MLB debut
- April 17, 2008, for the Texas Rangers

Last MLB appearance
- September 28, 2008, for the Texas Rangers

MLB statistics
- Batting average: .231
- Home runs: 3
- Runs batted in: 16
- Stats at Baseball Reference

Teams
- Texas Rangers (2008)

Germán Durán (born August 3, 1984) is a Mexican-American former professional baseball infielder. He played in Major League Baseball (MLB) for the Texas Rangers.

== Early life ==
Durán grew up in Fort Worth, Texas, where he attended Paschal High School and then briefly Texas Christian University. After playing one season at TCU, he transferred to Weatherford College.

== Baseball career ==
Duran was called up from Triple-A Oklahoma in April 2008 to replace an injured Hank Blalock. On April 17, 2008, Durán made his major league debut against the Toronto Blue Jays and struck out all three times in his three at bats. He hit his first home run on May 4, 2008 versus the Oakland Athletics. Duran was placed on waivers by the Rangers on June 26, 2009, and was claimed by the Houston Astros on July 1, 2009. German Duran played in the Mexican Baseball league in 2011 before joining the Grand Prairie AirHogs of the American Association. Hitting .317 in 12 games near the end of the season, Duran then hit .536 with 10 RBI in the playoffs, including a home run in game five of the championship series as the AirHogs won the championship over the St. Paul Saints. In December, the AirHogs sold his contract to the Miami Marlins.

On January 25, 2012, Duran signed a minor league contract with the Miami Marlins. He also received an invitation to spring training.
