= Eric Hurley =

American baseball player (born 1985)

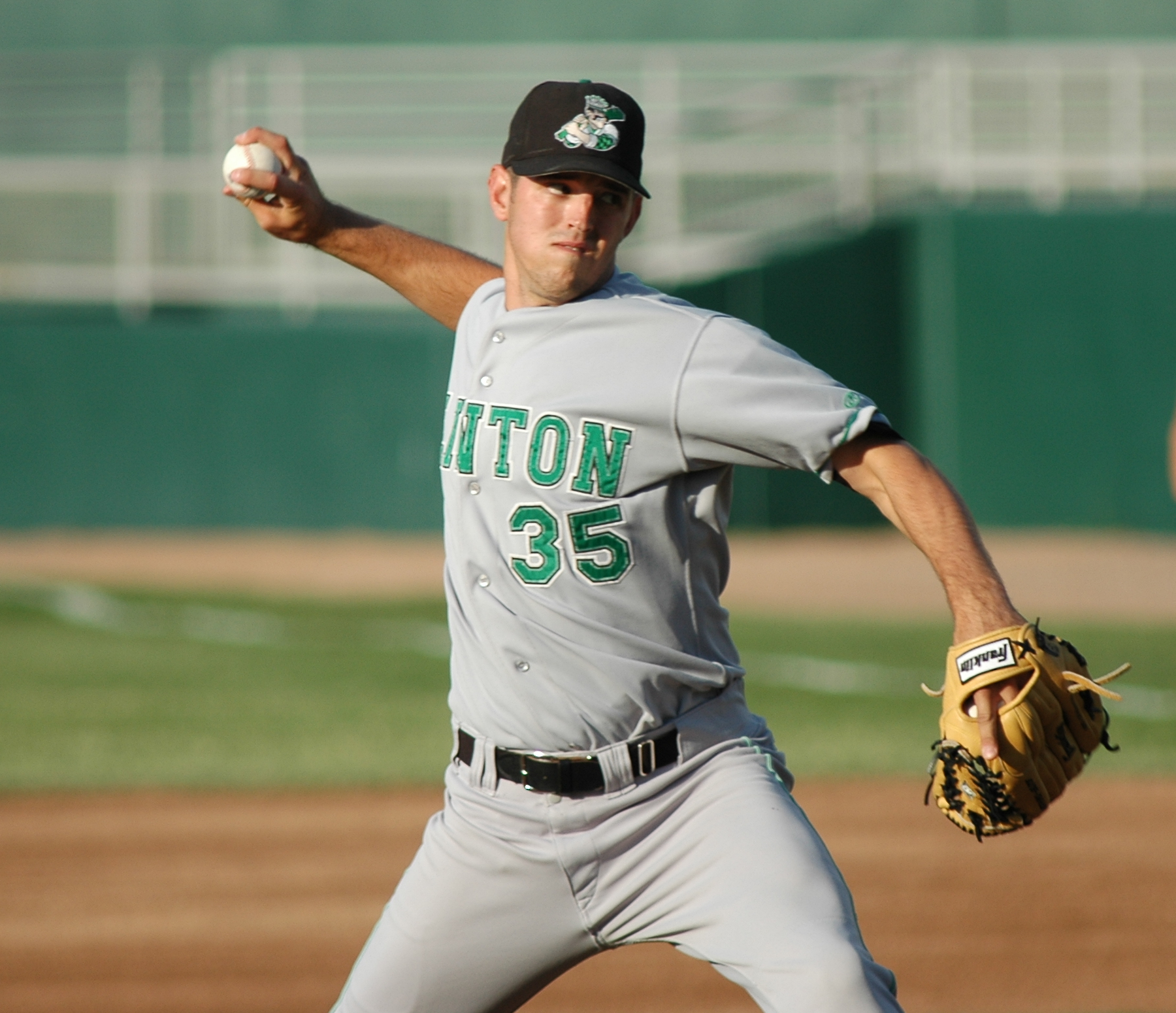
- Hurley pitching for the Clinton LumberKings in 2005.
- Pitcher
- Born: September 17, 1985 (age 40); Sikeston, Missouri, U.S.
- Batted: Right Threw: Right

MLB debut
- June 12, 2008, for the Texas Rangers

Last MLB appearance
- July 27, 2008, for the Texas Rangers

MLB statistics
- Win–loss record: 1–2
- Earned run average: 5.47
- Strikeouts: 13
- Stats at Baseball Reference

Teams
- Texas Rangers (2008)

Eric William Hurley (born September 17, 1985) is an American former professional baseball pitcher. He played in Major League Baseball (MLB) for the Texas Rangers in 2008.

== Career ==
=== High school ===
Hurley attended Samuel W. Wolfson High School in Jacksonville, Florida, where he was teammates with fellow first round draft pick Billy Butler who was selected by the Kansas City Royals.

=== Texas Rangers ===
Hurley was drafted in 2004 by the Texas Rangers in the first round and was their Minor League Pitcher of the Year in 2006. He made his major league debut on June 12, 2008, against the Kansas City Royals, pitching 6 innings but earning a no decision. Hurley earned his first major league victory on June 29, 2008, against the Philadelphia Phillies, giving up only one earned run over 5.2 innings.

Hurley missed the 2009 season after undergoing surgery for a torn rotator cuff before the season. In 2011, he missed starts due to a viral infection, and while he was out, fellow pitcher Neil Ramirez took his place. On November 2, 2011, Hurley was removed from the 40-man roster and sent outright to the Triple-A Oklahoma City RedHawks.

=== Los Angeles Angels of Anaheim ===
Hurley signed a minor league contract with the Los Angeles Angels of Anaheim on December 23, 2011. On July 6, 2012, he had his contract purchased by the Angels. Before appearing in any games, he was sent back to Triple-A and removed from the 40-man roster. After clearing waivers on July 20, he elected free agency.

=== Minnesota Twins ===
On July 24, 2012, Hurley signed a minor league contract with the Minnesota Twins.
