= Warner Madrigal =

Dominican baseball player (born 1984)

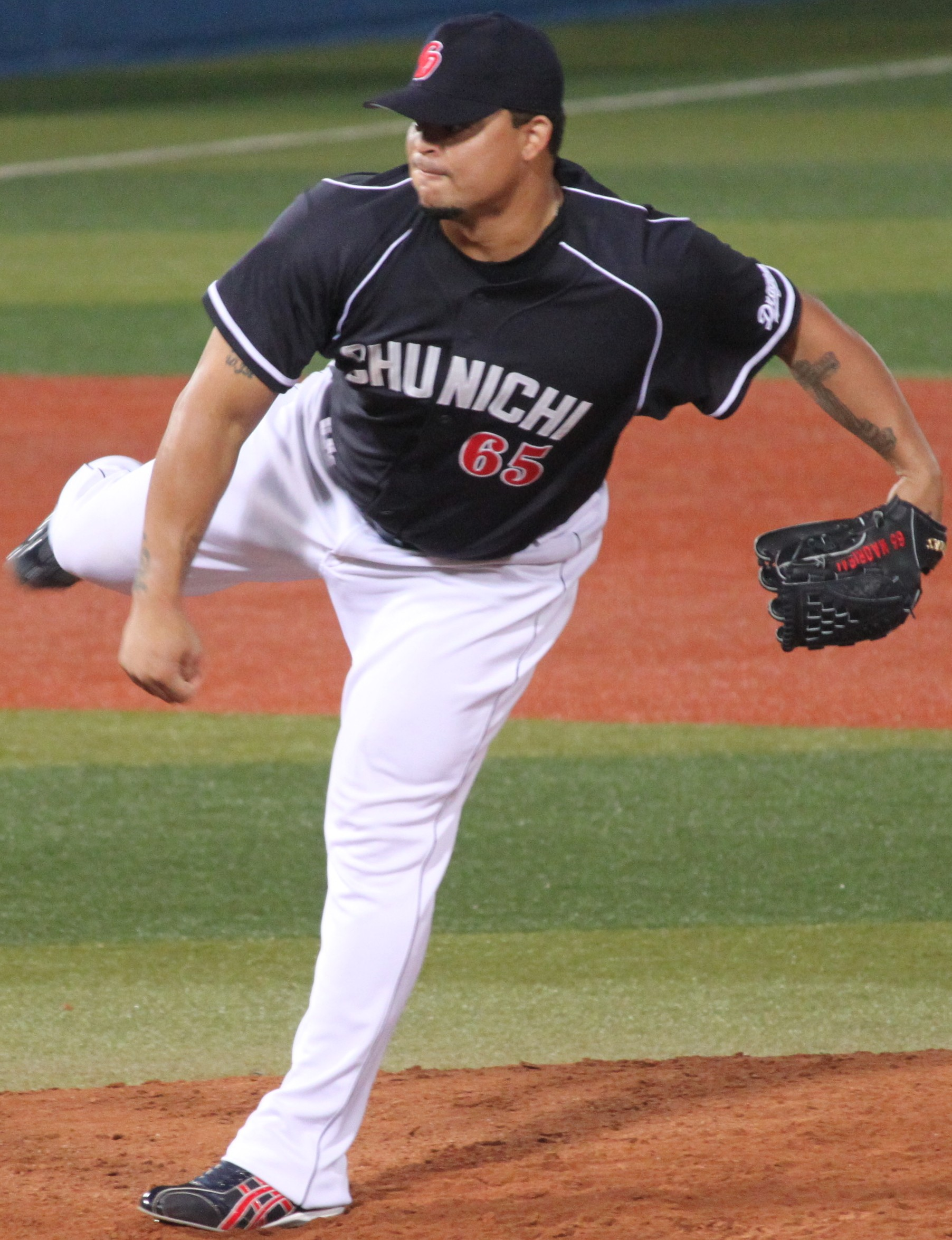
- Madrigal with the Chunichi Dragons
- Pitcher
- Born: March 21, 1984 (age 42); San Pedro de Macorís, Dominican Republic
- Bats: Right Throws: Right

Professional debut
- MLB: July 2, 2008, for the Texas Rangers
- NPB: July 6, 2013, for the Chunichi Dragons
- CPBL: March 26, 2015, for the Uni-President 7-Eleven Lions

MLB statistics
- Win–loss record: 0–2
- Earned run average: 6.10
- Strikeouts: 27

NPB statistics
- Win–loss record: 2–0
- Earned run average: 3.23
- Strikeouts: 28

CPBL statistics
- Win–loss record: 4–5
- Earned run average: 2.75
- Strikeouts: 48
- Stats at Baseball Reference

Teams
- Texas Rangers (2008–2009); Chunichi Dragons (2013); Uni-President 7-Eleven Lions (2015)

Warner Antonio Madrigal (born March 21, 1984) is a Dominican former professional baseball pitcher. He has previously played in Major League Baseball (MLB) for the Texas Rangers, Nippon Professional Baseball (NPB) for the Chunichi Dragons, and in the Chinese Professional Baseball League (CPBL) for the Uni-President 7-Eleven Lions.

== Professional career ==
=== Los Angeles Angels of Anaheim ===
Madrigal was signed out of the Dominican Republic by the Anaheim Angels in 2001. After spending three years as an outfielder for the Cedar Rapids Kernels, the Angels' Low-A affiliate, Madrigal was converted to a pitcher in 2006.

At the end of the 2007 season, the Angels decided to protect Madrigal from the Rule 5 Draft by putting him on their 40-man roster on November 6. However, because Madrigal had spent 6 years in the minor leagues with one team, he became a free agent at the close of the 2007 World Series on October 29.

=== Texas Rangers ===
The Texas Rangers subsequently signed Madrigal to a contract on November 18, 2007.

Madrigal made his debut for the Rangers on July 2, 2008, pitching in the 7th inning against the New York Yankees at old Yankee Stadium. Madrigal lasted only one-third of an inning, giving up six runs and Brett Gardner's first career hit.

Madrigal split the 2009 season between the major leagues and the Triple-A Oklahoma City RedHawks.

On April 8, 2010, Madrigal was placed on the 60-day disabled list. Upon his activation on June 24, Madrigal was outrighted off of the 40-man roster. On November 6, Madrigal elected free agency.

=== New York Yankees ===
On January 20, 2011, the New York Yankees signed Madrigal to a minor league contract with an invitation to spring training. He was assigned to the Scranton/Wilkes-Barre Yankees to begin the season. On June 24, Madrigal was released by the Yankees organization.

=== Arizona Diamondbacks ===
On December 21, 2012, Madrigal signed a minor league contract with the Arizona Diamondbacks. In 22 games for the Triple-A Reno Aces, he compiled a 2.75 ERA with 41 strikeouts across 36 innings pitched. Madrigal was released by the Diamondbacks organization on June 11, 2013.

=== Chunichi Dragons ===
Madrigal signed with the Chunichi Dragons for the 2013 season. On the year for the Dragons, Madrigal pitched to a 2-0 record with a 3.23 ERA and 28 strikeouts.

=== Washington Nationals ===
On January 23, 2014, Madrigal signed a minor league contract with the Washington Nationals organization. He was assigned to the Syracuse Chiefs to begin the season. On August 7, Madrigal was released.

=== Uni-President 7-Eleven Lions ===
Madrigal signed with the Uni-President 7-Eleven Lions of the Chinese Professional Baseball League prior to the 2015 season. In his tenure in the CPBL, Madrigal pitched to a 4-5 record with a 2.75 ERA and 48 strikeouts in 55 2/3 innings of work.

=== Rieleros de Aguascalientes ===
On May 26, 2016, Madrigal signed with the Rieleros de Aguascalientes of the Mexican League. He was released by the Rieleros on June 24.

=== Algodoneros de Unión Laguna ===
On February 5, 2020, Madrigal signed with the Algodoneros de Unión Laguna of the Mexican League. Madrigal did not play in a game in 2020 due to the cancellation of the Mexican League season because of the COVID-19 pandemic. On February 19, 2021, Madrigal was released.
