= 2008 Kansas City Royals season =

2008 Kansas City Royals
- League: American League
- Division: Central
- Ballpark: Kauffman Stadium
- City: Kansas City, Missouri
- Record: 75–87 (.463)
- Divisional place: 4th
- Owners: David Glass
- General managers: Dayton Moore
- Managers: Trey Hillman
- Television: FSN Kansas City
- Radio: KCSP 610 AM

The 2008 Kansas City Royals season was the 40th season for the franchise, and their 36th at Kauffman Stadium. The season began with the team searching for its 15th manager in franchise history. Trey Hillman, former minor league baseball and Hokkaido Nippon Ham Fighters (Nippon Professional Baseball) manager, was hired as the team's skipper on October 19, 2007.

The team looked to improve upon its record of 69–93 from 2007. The team's payroll for the 2008 season was initially estimated to be around $57 million, and wound up at $58 million (24th in the major leagues).

Despite another last-place finish in 2007, the Royals sought a breakout season in 2008. Renovations to Kauffman Stadium were ongoing throughout the 2008 season and it was completed in time for Opening Day in 2009.

Following the team's 81st game, the mid-way point of the 2008 season, the Royals had a 37–44 record. The closest the team managed to crawl back to a .500 record after their 9–6 start to the season was within 6 games in mid-July. After compiling a 7–20 record in August, the Royals were eliminated from recording their first winning season since 2003. However, an 18–8 record in September let the Royals finish with a 75–87 record, their best since 2003.

== Offseason ==
=== Coaching search ===
I'm a hungry guy...I do not like to lose. I like to start from the ground up and build, and build in such a way that it's going to be maintained for many years to come.

— Trey Hillman at his introductory press conference, October 22, 2007.

Buddy Bell announced his resignation at the end of the 2007 season after serving 2 1/2 seasons with the Royals. Early candidates to assume the manager's position included Royals bench coach Billy Doran, former Royals star Frank White, and Triple-A Omaha manager Mike Jirschele. Former Major League managers such as Joe Girardi, Jim Fregosi, Ken Macha, and Jimy Williams were also in consideration. Trey Hillman, who was considered a sleeper candidate, was chosen on October 19. Hillman was interviewed in 2007 by Texas, San Diego and Oakland. He was mentioned as a possible successor to Joe Torre with New York. Hillman had never played, coached or managed in Major League Baseball prior to his hiring by the Royals.

=== Winter meetings ===
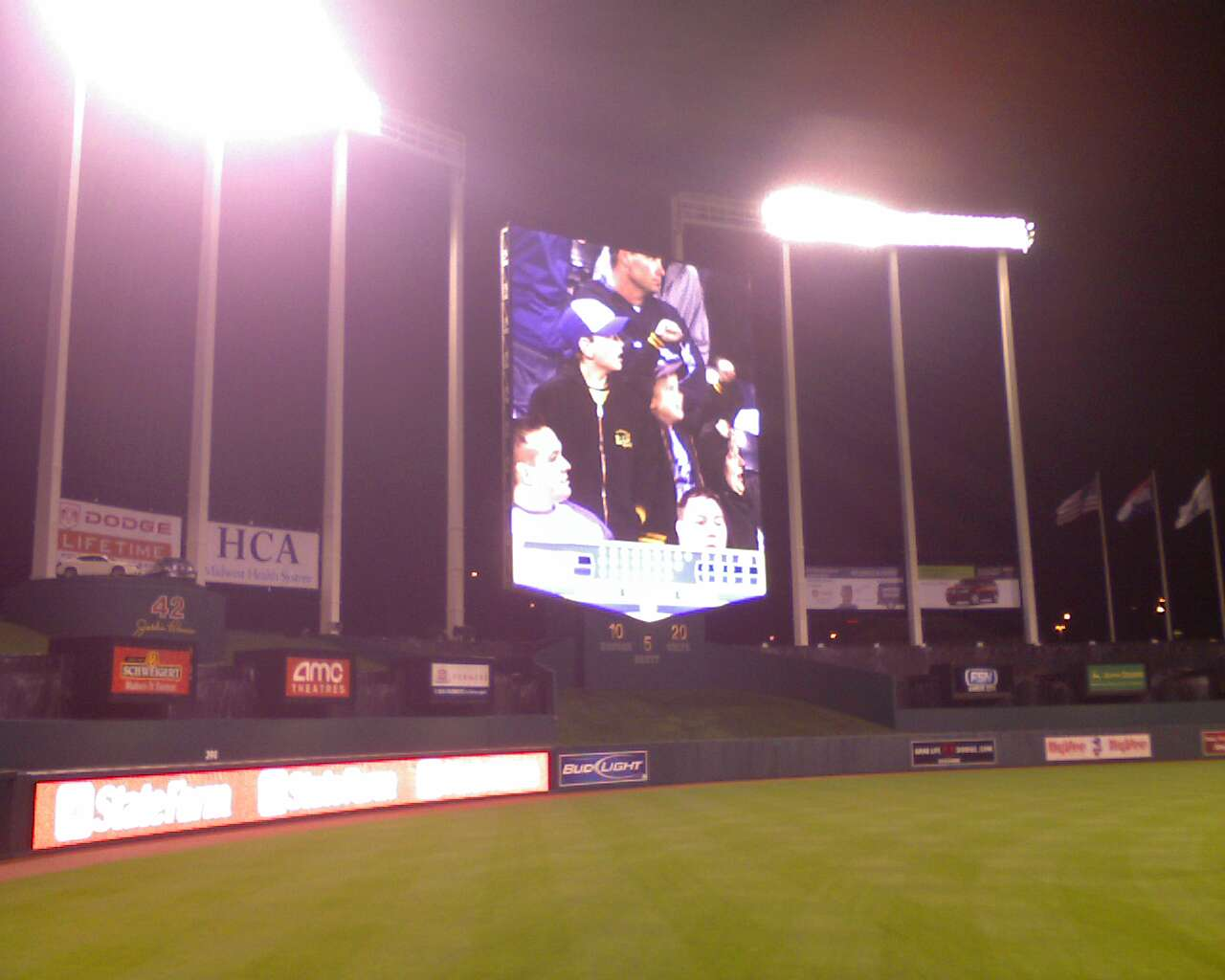
The new high-definition video board at Kauffman Stadium, installed in 2008. The stadium was under renovation while the season was still in progress.

The Royals entered baseball's winter meetings in December 2007 with José Guillén and Andruw Jones atop their free-agent prospects list. Torii Hunter was also considered by Kansas City before signing with the Los Angeles Angels of Anaheim. The Royals signed Guillén to a three-year, $36 million contract, while Jones signed with the Los Angeles Dodgers.

The acquisition of Guillén was the Royals' only major move at the winter meetings. Just before the meetings, the Royals had ministered to another need by signing reliever Yasuhiko Yabuta to a two-year deal with an option for 2010. Yabuta, from the Nippon Professional Baseball league, was seen as the likely successor to David Riske in a right-handed setup role. Riske left the Royals for a three-year, $13 million contract with the Milwaukee Brewers. Hiroki Kuroda was on the Royals' radar, but several other teams were in pursuit as well, and the Dodgers signed him first.

In the Rule 5 draft, the Royals picked up left-handed pitcher Ray Liotta from the Chicago White Sox.

=== Roster moves ===
Royals players eligible for arbitration

Kansas City avoided arbitration with all of its players for the 2008 season.

- C John Buck
- 1B Ross Gload
- IF Estéban Germán
- IF Jason Smith (released)
- OF Mark Teahen
- OF Emil Brown (released)
- LHP Jorge de la Rosa
- RHP Zack Greinke
- LHP Jimmy Gobble
- RHP Brandon Duckworth
- RHP Román Colón
- RHP Luke Hudson
Royals activity in free agency
- (x) = club option for 2008
- (m) = mutual option for 2008
- (y) = player option for 2008

Color Code Key

Color	Meaning
Green	Player will return to team
Light Green	Player joins team
Crimson	Player will not return to team (released, option not exercised, signed with new team, or retired etc.)
White	Player's status undetermined

Player	Position	2007 Team	2008 Team	Comments
Emil Brown	OF	Royals	Athletics	Signed 1 Year, $1.45M
Brian Buchanan	OF	Hawks	Royals	Signed minor league contract
Fernando Cortez	2B	Royals	White Sox	Signed minor league contract
Zach Day	RP	Twins		Elected Free agency
José Guillén	OF	Mariners	Royals	Signed a 3-year, $36 million deal
Jason LaRue	C	Royals	Cardinals	Signed 1 Year, $850K
Brian Lawrence	SP	Royals		Elected Free Agency
Colby Lewis	SP	Athletics	Central League (Japan)	Claimed off waivers from Athletics, released, signed w/ Hiroshima Carp
Ron Mahay	RP	Braves	Royals	Signed 2-years, $8M
Mike Maroth	SP	Royals		Elected Free Agency
Joe Nelson	RP	Royals	Marlins	Signed Minor League Contract
Hideo Nomo	SP	Did Not Play	Royals	Signed Minor league Contract
Miguel Olivo	C	Marlins	Royals	Signed 1-Year Contract w/ 2009 Mutual Option
Odalis Pérez	SP	Royals	Nationals	Royals declined option; signed minor league contract
Paul Phillips	C	Royals	White Sox	Spring training invitee
David Riske	RP	Royals	Brewers	Signed 3-year, $13M contract
Reggie Sanders	OF	Royals		Elected free agency
Mike Sweeney	1B	Royals	Athletics	Signed minor league contract
John Thomson	SP	Royals		Elected free agency
Brett Tomko	SP	Padres	Royals	Signed 1-Year, $3M
Chin-hui Tsao	RP	Dodgers	Royals	Spring training invitee
Yasuhiko Yabuta	RP	Marines	Royals	Signed 2-years, $6M deal with 2010 club option

==== Trades ====
December 15—Traded RHP Billy Buckner to the Arizona Diamondbacks for IF Alberto Callaspo.

=== Return of the Powder Blues ===
After a lengthy absence, the Royals' powder blue uniforms returned in 2008. The new powder blue jerseys were unveiled to season-ticket holders on December 6, 2007, at a private event in downtown Kansas City. Royals players John Buck, Mark Teahen, Alex Gordon, José Guillén and David DeJesus and manager Trey Hillman modeled the new power blue tops and white pants, which will be an alternate home jersey in 2008. The Royals previously wore powder-blue uniforms in away games from 1973 to 1991.

The Royals debuted the jerseys on April 12 against the Minnesota Twins. The first 20,000 fans for the game received a replica powder blue No. 16 Billy Butler jersey. With that promotion, the game was a sellout. Manager Trey Hillman and seven players—Brian Bannister, Gil Meche, Joey Gathright, Tony Peña Jr., John Bale, Zack Greinke and Butler—helped hand out the free jerseys when the gates opened at 4 p.m. All 20,000 powder blue tops were handed out within 40 minutes after the gates opened.

== Regular season ==
=== Suspensions ===
Outfielder José Guillén was to be suspended for 15 days (12 games) for violation of Major League Baseball's Drug Prevention and Treatment Program. Kansas City signed Guillén knowing that he might have been suspended. Guillén was cited in the Mitchell Report when it was released on December 13, 2007. Guillén's suspension was put on hold for 10 days allowing him to play in the team's season and home openers. The suspension was eventually upheld and Guillén never received any punishment.

Miguel Olivo faced a five-game suspension for fighting at New York in the 2007 season while a member of the Florida Marlins, but the suspension was reduced to four games after an appeal. He was eligible to begin playing on April 5 against the Minnesota Twins.

=== Monthly summaries ===
==== March and April ====
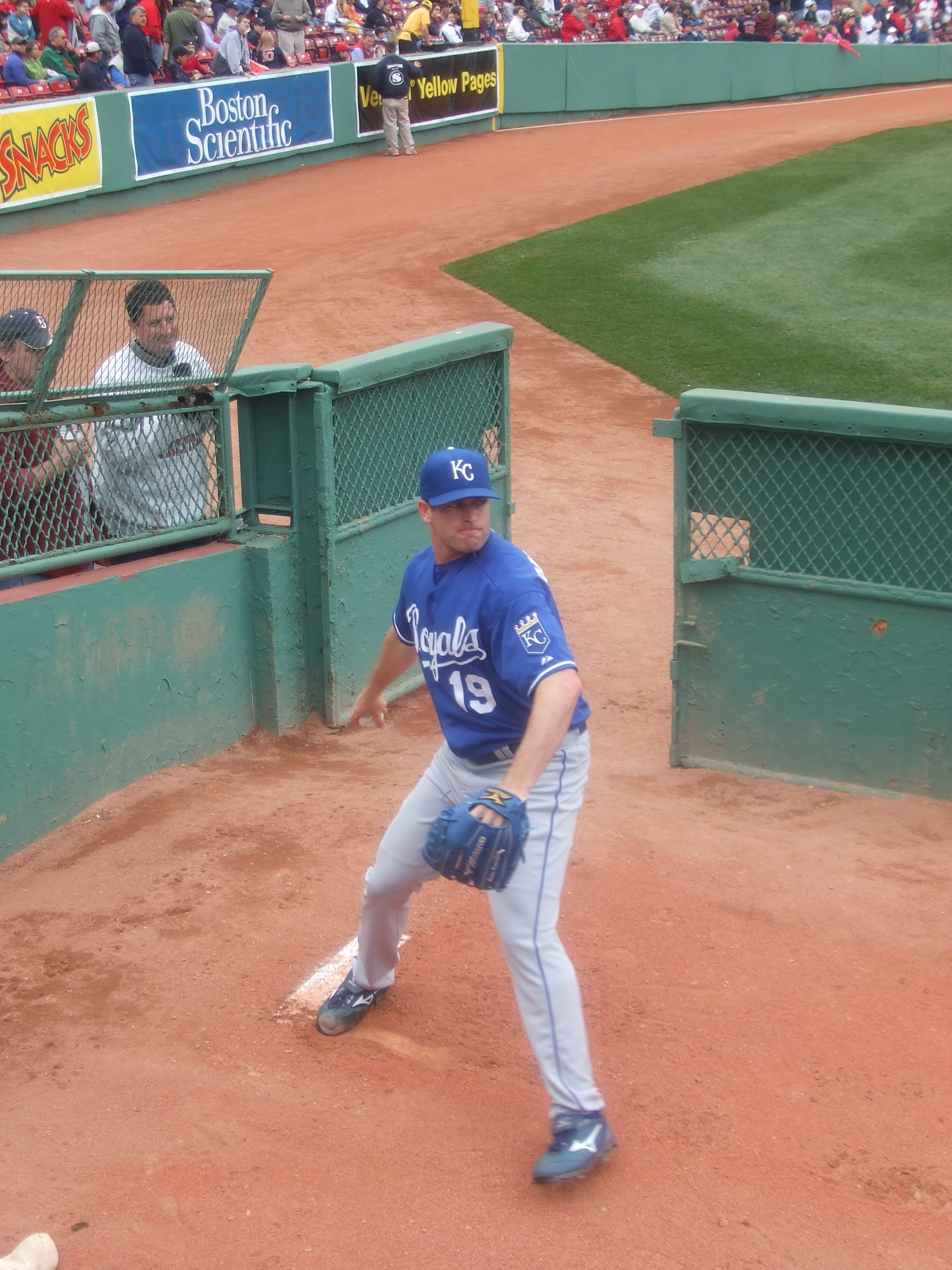
Brian Bannister was named AL co-Player of the Week after throwing a complete game on April 13.

On March 31, the Detroit Tigers hosted the Royals on Opening Day. Kansas City listed only 24 players on their active roster, as Miguel Olivo began serving his four-game suspension. The roster listed 11 pitchers, 7 infielders, 4 outfielders, and 2 catchers. Gil Meche made his second consecutive Opening Day start for the Royals, lasting six innings. The Royals won the game 5–4 in 11 innings, and went on to sweep the Tigers in the three-game series outscoring them 13–5. Kansas City hosted the New York Yankees for their home-opening series at Kauffman Stadium and won two of three games. Their 6–2 start was the franchise's best since 2003.

The Royals hosted the Twins from April 11–13, where game-time temperatures reached as low as 29 °F (−2 °C) for the series. After losing the first two games and not scoring any runs, the Royals won the last game by a score of 5–1. Kansas City debuted their new alternate powder blue home jerseys to a sold-out crowd on April 12, with a replica jersey giveaway promotion. Brian Bannister threw a complete game and allowed only three hits on April 13 in a 5–1 win. The following night, Zack Greinke threw a complete game as well.

It was not until their 19th game of the season that the Royals fell under a .500 winning percentage in the middle of a seven-game losing streak after going 9–6 to start the season. When the streak was snapped they were 10–13. In 2007, the Royals lost their second game of the year and remained under .500 for the remainder of the season, finishing with a record of 69–93.

==== May ====
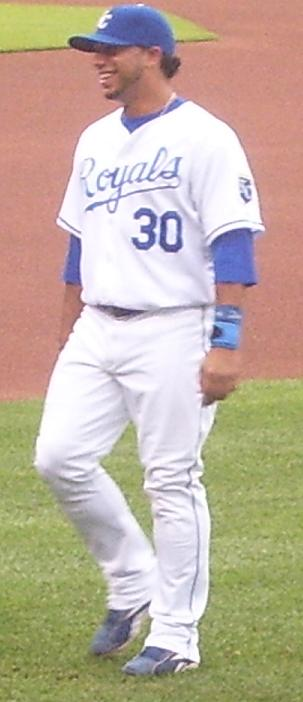
After only 19 games, Mike Avilés was hitting .352 with 3 home runs, a triple, 9 doubles, 16 runs scored, and 14 runs batted in.

At the Royals' May 9 game against the Baltimore Orioles, Kansas City-native David Cook threw out the ceremonial first pitch and sang "Take Me Out to the Ballgame" in the seventh inning stretch. At the time, Cook was a finalist on American Idol, and he eventually won the competition.

Brian Bannister threw a two-hitter on May 11 in a 4–0 win over Baltimore for the Royals' first victory over the Orioles after losing 12 consecutive games to the franchise. Through 40 games, Joakim Soria had a 0.00 ERA and ten saves, and the Royals signed him to a three-year contract extension through the 2011 season.

In early May, Kansas City completed their second series sweep against Detroit, advancing to 6–0 over the Tigers on the season. Jon Lester of the Boston Red Sox threw a no-hitter against Kansas City on May 19. It was just the Royals' second game to register no hits against an opponent, and the first since May 15, 1973.

The Royals endured a 12-game losing streak following the loss to Lester and the Red Sox, sending them 11 games under .500 and in last place of the American League Central. The Royals started their May 31 game against Cleveland with the fewest runs, sacrifice flies, RBIs and walks in the major leagues, but beat reigning Cy Young Award winner CC Sabathia 4–2 to end their losing streak.

The losing streak prompted José Guillén to criticize his team's performance with the media after a 9–8 loss to Minnesota:

"We've got 25 people. We've got to play as a team, win as a team and lose as a team. We've got too many babies here. They don't know how to play the game and play the game right, the way it's supposed to be played...That's the problem here. Now I know why this organization has been losing for a while."

The Royals' losing streak was the longest in the majors since Kansas City and Pittsburgh both had 13-game losing streaks in 2006. While going almost two weeks without a win, Kansas City had allowed three grand slams, lost a five-run lead in the ninth inning of one game and scored three or fewer runs in nine others. It was the Royals' fourth time losing 12 consecutive games in franchise history, and all of the streaks have occurred since 1997. The losing caused Kansas City to make roster changes by sending the struggling Billy Butler to Triple-A affiliate Omaha. Mike Avilés was called up in exchange.

==== June ====
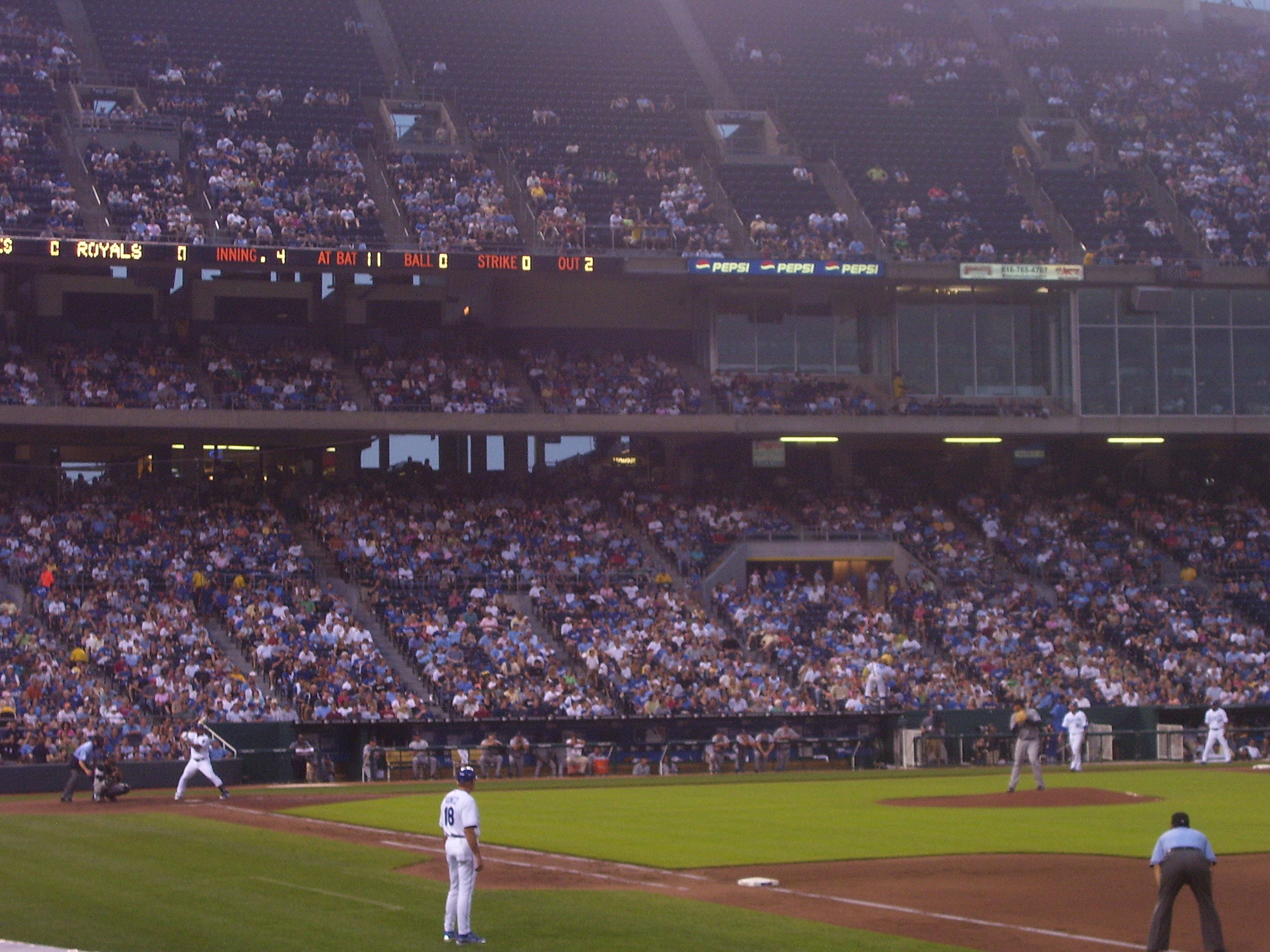
José Guillén at bat against Rockies pitcher Jorge de la Rosa.

Looking to rebound from their 12-game losing streak in May, the Royals started the month of June with 4 consecutive series wins over National League opponents. Kansas City completed its first ever series sweep of the Cardinals in St. Louis. In 12 years of Interleague play, the Cardinals still hold the I-70 Series lead, 26–22, but the Royals have done better in St. Louis, winning 11 of 21 games. On June 22, the Royals made an improbable comeback after trailing 6-0 and later 10–3 against the San Francisco Giants. The Royals scored 8 unanswered runs and won the game and Joakim Soria recorded his 20th save of the season in 21 tries. Following a sweep of the defending National League champion Colorado Rockies, the Royals boasted an MLB-best 12–3 record in Interleague play and won for the tenth time in 11 games. Following their 12-game skid ended in May, the Royals went 15–9, closed to within seven games of .500 and skipped out of last place of the American League Central.

José Guillén made controversial remarks about Royals fans following booing in the June 25 game against the Rockies which prompted him to apologize days later to the Royals fanbase and team management. Fans booed Guillén in the eighth inning of the Royals' 4–2 win. He grounded to Colorado Rockies third baseman Garrett Atkins and began a slow run toward first base. Atkins' throw was off target, forcing Todd Helton to leave the bag. If Guillén had been at full speed, he might have been safe. Guillén had been battling several injuries which had caused him to play easier in order to avoid the disabled list.

After defeating the Cardinals at Kauffman Stadium, the Royals boasted a six-game winning-streak, the team's best since their 9–0 start in the 2003 season. Billy Butler rejoined the team after Alberto Callaspo was involved in a drunk driving incident.

At the Royals' home game against the Cardinals, the team inducted Art Stewart into the Royals Hall of Fame. Stewart became the first scout to be inducted into any of Major League Baseball's franchise hall of fames, and the Royals' 23rd overall inductee.

In the final game of the month, the Royals defeated the Baltimore Orioles after Miguel Olivo, on a 0-2 pitch, hit a game-tying home run into the left-field seats in the bottom of the 9th inning. José Guillén batted in the Royals' game-winning run and Joakim Soria closed out the game for his 22nd save. The Royals finished out the month of June with a 16–11 record.

==== July ====
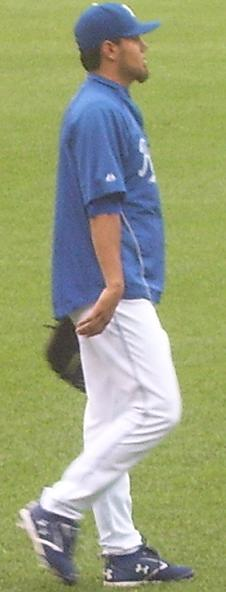
Joakim Soria was chosen as the Royals' lone representative in the 2008 MLB All-Star Game. He finished the season with 42 saves.

Joakim Soria was selected to be the Royals' lone representative in the 2008 Major League Baseball All-Star Game, and José Guillén was named to the All-Star Final Vote ballot. Guillén was involved in a heated argument with pitching coach Bob McClure before the team's July 5 game against the Tampa Bay Rays, but was not penalized for his actions.

At the All-Star break, the Royals boasted a record of 43–53, an improvement compared to their 38–50 record from 2007 and 31–56 record in 2006.

On July 21, the Royals suffered their worst defeat of the season, and the Tigers registered their first victory over Kansas City in 2008 with a score of 19–4. By the seventh inning, it was 9–0 in favor of Detroit. The Tigers' 10-run eighth inning mostly came against Jimmy Gobble, who was charged with all 10 runs. At one point in the inning, Gobble allowed six straight hits, the last being a home run by Gary Sheffield. His ERA spiraled from 7.99 to 11.31. Gobble faced 12 hitters in the inning before Hillman finally called for Leo Núñez to substitute. The Royals, behind 19–0, finally broke through with four runs in their half of the eighth. They had five straight hits, including Billy Butler's two-run single. Manager Trey Hillman said following the game:

It was a nasty loss...Obviously lopsided—a laugher for them. Toward the end, at least we were playing with a little bit of pride, still battling and we got rid of the shutout. That was a positive.

Hillman decided to enlist shortstop Tony Peña Jr. to pitch the ninth inning for the Royals. Peña, who lost his starting shortstop job to Mike Avilés, pitched a one-two-three inning and registered 90 mph (140 km/h)-plus on the radar gun. This was his first competitive pitching since high school in the Dominican Republic. Peña was the first position player pressed into pitching service by the Royals since July 17, 1998, when infielder Shane Halter took a turn in an 18–5 loss at Seattle.

On July 29, ESPN Deportes reported that José Guillén expressed his wish to be traded due to a bad relationship with manager Trey Hillman. When Guillén signed with Kansas City he knew the team wouldn't be a contender in 2008, but he was promised that moves would be made to build a winning team in 2009. Kansas City had not shown any interest in trading Guillén. The source said Guillén was ready to defer his salary for 2009 and 2010 if it were to help increase his value on the trading block. A "visibly upset" Guillén met with Hillman and denied the report. The trade deadline passed on July 31 and the Royals made no trades.

==== August ====
The Royals recorded a season-high 19 runs against the Chicago White Sox on August 2 in a 9–7 win. The following day, Kansas City closed out the series against Chicago by winning 14–3. In two days, the Royals recorded 38 total hits for the first time in franchise history. The Royals finally fought back against the White Sox—who have dominated the Royals in years past—both literally and figuratively. Four players and both teams' managers were ejected from the game after confrontations over wild pitches.

The Royals and White Sox played again in mid-August and on August 14 Kansas City allowed four consecutive home runs in the sixth inning to White Sox batters, tying the MLB record. Joel Peralta gave up the first three and Robinson Tejeda allowed the last home run after a pitching change.

José Guillén had to be restrained from a heckling fan during the fourth inning of a 2–1 loss to the Texas Rangers on August 26. Royals third base coach Luis Silverio and others restrained Guillén, while security escorted to a new seat in Kauffman Stadium. Guillén met with Royals general manager Dayton Moore to discuss Guillén's public outburst, his fourth of the season. Royals manager Trey Hillman did not see the incident take place. "I was actually in the toilet, so I didn't see it", Hillman said. "Managers do have to use the restroom and I guess I picked a bad time to be in the restroom. I found out about it a half inning later. We talked about it briefly. There's no sense on commenting on it."

Through 114 games, the Royals were just 7 games under .500, but winning only 7 out of 27 games in the month of August effectively assured Kansas City of another losing season.

==== September ====
Too bad this isn't our August...It's a step forward that we need to realize, take, use and finish up strong so we have some good momentum going into the offseason.

— John Buck on the Royals' strong finish in September.

Going into September, it seemed that the Royals' 7–20 record in August had doomed them to a last-place finish in the American League Central, but the team's best September since the 1977 season helped erase the losing record in the previous month. The Royals took control of fourth place in the division with another three-game sweep of Detroit.

The Royals tied their win total from the 2007 season (69) with a victory over the Seattle Mariners on September 18. The victory was the team's seventh consecutive victory.

In their final series of the season, the Twins hosted the Royals. The Twins hold a ½ game lead in the American League Central over the White Sox, and the Royals won two of three games, leading to a one-game playoff between the Twins and White Sox.

The Royals finished the season with a 75–87 record, their best since 2003 thanks to an 18–8 mark in September.

=== Season standings ===
AL Central
Team	W	L	Pct.	GB	Home	Road
Chicago White Sox	89	74	.546	—	54‍–‍28	35‍–‍46
Minnesota Twins	88	75	.540	1	53‍–‍28	35‍–‍47
Cleveland Indians	81	81	.500	7½	45‍–‍36	36‍–‍45
Kansas City Royals	75	87	.463	13½	38‍–‍43	37‍–‍44
Detroit Tigers	74	88	.457	14½	40‍–‍41	34‍–‍47

=== Record vs. opponents ===
2008 American League record Source: MLB Standings Grid – 2008
Team	BAL	BOS	CWS	CLE	DET	KC	LAA	MIN	NYY	OAK	SEA	TB	TEX	TOR	NL
Baltimore	–	6–12	4–5	4–4	4–3	5–3	3–6	3–3	7–11	0–5	8–2	3–15	4–5	6–12	11–7
Boston	12–6	–	4–3	5–1	5–2	6–1	1–8	4–3	9–9	6–4	6–3	8–10	9–1	9–9	11–7
Chicago	5–4	3–4	–	11–7	12–6	12–6	5–5	9–10	2–5	5–4	5–1	4–6	3–3	1–7	12–6
Cleveland	4–4	1–5	7–11	–	11–7	10–8	4–5	8–10	4–3	5–4	4–5	5–2	6–4	6–1	6–12
Detroit	3–4	2–5	6–12	7–11	–	7–11	3–6	7–11	4–2	3–6	7–3	3–4	6–3	3–5	13–5
Kansas City	3–5	1–6	6–12	8–10	11–7	–	2–3	6–12	5–5	6–3	7–2	3–5	2–7	2–5	13–5
Los Angeles	6–3	8–1	5–5	5–4	6–3	3–2	–	5–3	7–3	10–9	14–5	3–6	12–7	6–3	10–8
Minnesota	3–3	3–4	10–9	10–8	11–7	12–6	3–5	–	4–6	5–5	5–4	3–3	5–5	0–6	14–4
New York	11–7	9–9	5–2	3–4	2–4	5–5	3–7	6–4	–	5–1	7–2	11–7	3–4	9–9	10–8
Oakland	5–0	4–6	4–5	4–5	6–3	3–6	9–10	5–5	1–5	-	10–9	3–6	7–12	4–6	10–8
Seattle	2–8	3–6	1–5	5–4	3–7	2–7	5–14	4–5	2–7	9–10	–	3–4	8–11	5–4	9–9
Tampa Bay	15–3	10–8	6–4	2–5	4–3	5–3	6–3	3–3	7–11	6–3	4–3	–	6–3	11–7	12–6
Texas	5–4	1–9	3–3	4–6	3–6	7–2	7–12	5–5	4–3	12–7	11–8	3–6	–	4–4	10–8
Toronto	12–6	9–9	7–1	1–6	5–3	5–2	3–6	6–0	9–9	6–4	4–5	7–11	4–4	–	8–10

=== Roster ===
2008 Kansas City Royals
Roster
Pitchers: 49 John Bale; 19 Brian Bannister; 28 Kyle Davies; 31 Brandon Duckworth; 54 Jeff Fulchino; 41 Jimmy Gobble; 23 Zack Greinke; 44 Luke Hochevar; 52 Devon Lowery; 45,32 Ron Mahay; 55 Gil Meche; 58 Neal Musser; 11 Hideo Nomo; 46 Leo Núñez; 57 Joel Peralta; 52 Horacio Ramírez; 56 Ramón Ramírez; 53 Carlos Rosa; 48 Joakim Soria; 51 Robinson Tejeda; 25 Brett Tomko; 40 Kip Wells; 27 Yasuhiko Yabuta	Catchers: 14 John Buck; 21 Miguel Olivo; 12 Matt Tupman; Infielders: 30 Mike Avilés; 16 Billy Butler; 13 Alberto Callaspo; 7 Ross Gload; 4 Alex Gordon; 15 Mark Grudzielanek; 25 Kila Ka'aihue; 1 Tony Peña Jr.; 43 Ryan Shealy; 26 Jason Smith	Outfielders: 9 David DeJesus; 2 Joey Gathright; 3 Estéban Germán; 11 José Guillén; 35 Mitch Maier; 24 Mark Teahen	Manager: 22 Trey Hillman; Coaches: 8 Mike Barnett (hitting); 60 Bill Duplissea (bullpen catcher); 18 Rusty Kuntz (first base); 33 Bob McClure (pitching); 50 John Mizerock (bullpen); 6 Dave Owen (bench); 17 Luis Silverio (third base)

=== Game log ===
2008 Game Log
March

#	Date	Opponent	Score	Win	Loss	Save	Attendance	Record
1	March 31	@ Tigers	5 – 4 (11)	Núñez (1–0)	Bautista (0–1)	Soria (1)	44,934	1–0

April

#	Date	Opponent	Score	Win	Loss	Save	Attendance	Record
2	April 2	@ Tigers	4 – 0	Bannister (1–0)	Rogers (0–1)		32,348	2–0
3	April 3	@ Tigers	4 – 1	Greinke (1–0)	Bonderman (0–1)	Soria (2)	32,735	3–0
4	April 4	@ Twins	4 – 3	Baker (1–0)	Bale (0–1)	Nathan (2)	21,847	3–1
5	April 5	@ Twins	6 – 4	Hernández (2–0)	Meche (0–1)	Nathan (3)	21,262	3–2
6	April 6	@ Twins	3 – 1	Tomko (1–0)	Bonser (0–2)	Soria (3)	21,765	4–2
7	April 8	Yankees	5 – 2	Bannister (2–0)	Hughes (0–1)	Soria (4)	37,296	5–2
8	April 9	Yankees	4 – 0	Greinke (2–0)	Farnsworth (0–1)	Gobble (1)	19,007	6–2
9	April 10	Yankees	6 – 1	Pettitte (1-1)	Bale (0–2)		16,143	6–3
10	April 11	Twins	5 – 0	Hernández (3–0)	Meche (0–2)		16,691	6–4
11	April 12	Twins	2 – 0	Bonser (1–2)	Tomko (1-1)	Nathan (4)	36,300	6–5
12	April 13	Twins	5 – 1	Bannister (3–0)	Liriano (0–1)		13,886	7–5
13	April 14	@ Mariners	5 – 1	Greinke (3–0)	Washburn (1–2)		16,751	8–5
14	April 15	@ Mariners	11 – 6	Batista (1–2)	Bale (0–3)		17,137	8–6
15	April 16	@ Angels	3 – 2	Meche (1–2)	Weaver (1–3)	Soria (5)	41,336	9–6
16	April 17	@ Angels	5 – 3	Garland (2-2)	Tomko (1–2)	Rodríguez (6)	40,021	9–7
17	April 18	@ Athletics	13 – 2	Gaudin (1-1)	Bannister (3–1)		12,528	9–8
18	April 19	@ Athletics	6 – 5	Devine (2–0)	Peralta (0–1)	Street (5)	20,390	9-9
19	April 20	@ Athletics	7 – 1	Eveland (2–1)	Hochevar (0–1)		18,645	9–10
20	April 22	Indians	15 – 1	Sabathia (1–3)	Meche (1–3)		16,165	9–11
N/A	April 23	Indians	Postponed (rain) Rescheduled for April 24					
21	April 24	Indians (doubleheader)	9 – 6	Carmona (3–1)	Tomko (1–3)	Betancourt (1)	11,637	9–12
22	April 24	Indians (doubleheader)	2 – 0	Lee (4–0)	Bannister (3–2)		11,637	9–13
23	April 25	Blue Jays	8 – 4	Núñez (2–0)	Burnett (2-2)		22,561	10–13
24	April 26	Blue Jays	2 – 1	Hochevar (1-1)	Marcum (2-2)	Soria (6)	24,078	11–13
25	April 27	Blue Jays	5 – 2	Litsch (3–1)	Meche (1–4)	Carlson (1)	13,998	11–14
26	April 29	@ Rangers	9 – 5	Mahay (1–0)	Jennings (0–5)		16,472	12–14
27	April 30	@ Rangers	11 – 9	Millwood (2-2)	Bannister (3–2)		17,705	12–15

May

#	Date	Opponent	Score	Win	Loss	Save	Attendance	Record
28	May 1	@ Rangers	2 – 1	Ponson (1–0)	Greinke (3–1)	Wilson (6)	14,563	12–16
N/A	May 2	@ Indians	Postponed (rain) Rescheduled for September 13					
29	May 3	@ Indians	4 – 2	Hochevar (2–1)	Sabathia (1–5)	Soria (7)	27,272	13–16
30	May 4	@ Indians	2 – 0	Meche (2–4)	Laffey (0–2)	Soria (8)	27,836	14–16
31	May 5	Angels	4 – 0	Santana (6–0)	R. Ramírez (0–1)		12,157	14–17
32	May 6	Angels	5 – 3	Oliver (2–1)	Bannister (3–4)	Rodríguez (14)	11,354	14–18
33	May 7	Angels	9 – 4	Greinke (4–1)	Weaver (2–5)		11,084	15–18
34	May 8	Orioles	4 – 1	Cabrera (3–1)	Hochevar (2-2)		11,781	15–19
35	May 9	Orioles	7 – 4	Trachsel (2–4)	Meche (2–4)	Sherrill (12)	21,873	15–20
36	May 10	Orioles	6 – 5	Olson (1–0)	Tomko (1–4)	Sherrill (13)	15,808	15–21
37	May 11	Orioles	4 – 0	Bannister (4-4)	Burres (3–4)		18,635	16–21
38	May 13	Tigers	3 – 2	Núñez (3–0)	Cruceta (0–1)	Soria (9)	11,703	17–21
39	May 14	Tigers	2 – 0	Hochevar (3–2)	Verlander (1–7)	Soria (10)	14,053	18–21
40	May 15	Tigers	8 – 4	Meche (3–5)	Rogers (3–4)		34,734	19–21
41	May 16	@ Marlins	7 – 6	Tomko (2–4)	Miller (3-3)	Soria (11)	14,825	20–21
42	May 17	@ Marlins	7 – 3	Kensing (3–0)	Bannister (4–5)		16,214	20–22
43	May 18	@ Marlins	9 – 3	Greinke (5–1)	Badenhop (1–3)		10,617	21–22
44	May 19	@ Red Sox	7 – 0	Lester (3–2)	Hochevar (3-3)		37,746	21–23
45	May 20	@ Red Sox	2 – 1	Masterson (1–0)	Meche (3–6)	Papelbon (13)	37,486	21–24
46	May 21	@ Red Sox	6 – 3	Colón (1–0)	Tomko (2–5)		37,674	21–25
47	May 22	@ Red Sox	11 – 8	Matsuzaka (8–0)	Bannister (4–6)	Papelbon (14)	37,613	21–26
48	May 23	@ Blue Jays	7 – 1	Halladay (5-5)	Greinke (5–2)		24,207	21–27
49	May 24	@ Blue Jays	6 – 0	Litsch (6–1)	Hochevar (3–4)		28,162	21–28
50	May 25	@ Blue Jays	3 – 1	McGowan (3–4)	Meche (3–7)	Ryan (11)	29,315	21–29
51	May 26	@ Blue Jays	7 – 2	Marcum (5–3)	Tomko (2–6)		23,157	21–30
52	May 27	Twins	4 – 3 (12)	Crain (2-2)	Núñez (3–1)	Guerrier (1)	17,191	21–31
53	May 28	Twins	9 – 8 (10)	Crain (3–2)	Peralta (0–2)	Nathan (14)	13,621	21–32
54	May 29	Twins	5 – 1	Slowey (2–4)	Hochevar (3–5)		12,336	21–33
55	May 30	Indians	5 – 4	Lee (8–1)	Tomko (2–7)	Borowski (4)	25,243	21–34
56	May 31	Indians	4 – 2	Davies (1–0)	Sabathia (3–7)	Soria (12)	23,923	22–34

June

#	Date	Opponent	Score	Win	Loss	Save	Attendance	Record
57	June 1	Indians	6 – 1	Bannister (5–6)	Byrd (2–5)		22,345	23–34
58	June 3	@ White Sox	9 – 5	Floyd (6–3)	Greinke (5–3)		21,727	23–35
59	June 4	@ White Sox	6 – 4 (15)	Dotel (3–2)	Gobble (0–1)		23,515	23–36
60	June 5	@ White Sox	6 – 2	Contreras (6–3)	Meche (3–8)		25,104	23–37
61	June 6	@ Yankees	2 – 1	Davies (2–0)	Rasner (3-3)	Soria (13)	52,187	24–37
62	June 7	@ Yankees	12 – 11	Rivera (2–1)	Soria (0–1)		53,611	24–38
63	June 8	@ Yankees	6 – 3	Giese (1-1)	Greinke (5–4)	Rivera (16)	54,213	24–39
64	June 9	@ Yankees	3 – 2	Yabuta (1–0)	Rivera (2-2)	Soria (14)	53,633	25–39
65	June 10	Rangers	6 – 5	Guardado (1-1)	Yabuta (1-1)	Wilson (12)	14,741	25–40
66	June 11	Rangers	11 – 5	Padilla (8–3)	Gobble (0–2)		20,840	25–41
67	June 12	Rangers	6 – 5	Mahay (2–0)	Francisco (1–2)	Soria (15)	15,515	26–41
68	June 13	@ Diamondbacks	1 – 0 (10)	Buckner (1–0)	Yabuta (1–2)		33,323	26–42
69	June 14	@ Diamondbacks	12 – 3	Hochevar (4–5)	Johnson (4-4)		44,615	27–42
70	June 15	@ Diamondbacks	8 – 3	Meche (4–8)	Owings (6–5)		39,125	28–42
71	June 17	@ Cardinals	2 – 1	Davies (3–0)	Villone (1–2)	Soria (16)	43,793	29–42
72	June 18	@ Cardinals	3 – 2	Bannister (6-6)	McClellan (0–2)	Soria (17)	43,810	30–42
73	June 19	@ Cardinals	4 – 1	Greinke (6–4)	Thompson (1–2)	Soria (18)	44,277	31–42
74	June 20	Giants	9 – 4	Cain (4–5)	Yabuta (1–3)		34,588	31–43
75	June 21	Giants	5 – 3	Meche (5–8)	Correia (1–5)	Soria (19)	28,903	32–43
76	June 22	Giants	11 – 10	Mahay (3–0)	Hinshaw (1-1)	Soria (20)	20,499	33–43
77	June 23	Rockies	8 – 4	Bannister (7–6)	Francis (3–7)		12,260	34–43
78	June 24	Rockies	7 – 3	Greinke (7–4)	de la Rosa (2–4)		19,169	35–43
79	June 25	Rockies	4 – 2	Hochevar (5-5)	Cook (10–5)	Soria (21)	16,615	36–43
80	June 27	Cardinals	7 – 2	Meche (6–8)	Piñeiro (2–4)		36,360	37–43
81	June 28	Cardinals	5 – 1	Boggs (3–0)	Davies (3–1)		37,537	37–44
82	June 29	Cardinals	9 – 6	Pérez (2–0)	Bannister (7-7)	Franklin (11)	31,803	37–45
83	June 30	@ Orioles	6 – 5 (11)	Mahay (4–0)	Bradford (3-3)	Soria (22)	15,289	38–45

July

#	Date	Opponent	Score	Win	Loss	Save	Attendance	Record
84	July 1	@ Orioles	7 – 5	Liz (3–0)	Hochevar (5–6)	Sherrill (27)	19,756	38–46
85	July 2	@ Orioles	5 – 2	Cabrera (6–4)	Meche (6–9)		17,909	38–47
86	July 3	@ Orioles	10 – 7	Peralta (1–2)	Loewen (0–2)	Soria (23)	16,782	39–47
87	July 4	@ Rays	11 – 2	Jackson (5–6)	Bannister (7–8)		16,830	39–48
88	July 5	@ Rays	3 – 0	Sonnanstine (10–3)	Greinke (7–5)	Balfour (3)	30,418	39–49
89	July 6	@ Rays	9 – 2	Shields (7–5)	Hochevar (6–5)		20,587	39–50
90	July 7	@ Rays	7 – 4	Soria (1-1)	Wheeler (2–4)		16,293	40–50
91	July 8	White Sox	8 – 7 (13)	Masset (1–0)	Tejeda (0–1)		13,614	40–51
92	July 9	White Sox	7-6	Russell (3–0)	Tejeda (0–2)	Dotel (1)	16,502	40–52
93	July 10	White Sox	4 – 1	Mahay (5–0)	Buehrle (6–8)	Soria (24)	14,547	41–52
94	July 11	Mariners	3 – 1	Hochevar (6–7)	Hernández (6-6)	Soria (25)	25,345	42–52
95	July 12	Mariners	5 – 4	H. Ramírez (1–0)	Morrow (1–2)		23,792	43–52
96	July 13	Mariners	4 – 3	Green (2-2)	Soria (1–2)	Morrow (9)	21,421	43–53
97	July 18	@ White Sox	9 – 5	Buehrle (7–8)	Greinke (7–6)		36,291	43–54
98	July 19	@ White Sox	9 – 1	Meche (7–9)	Floyd (10–6)		36,566	44–54
99	July 20	@ White Sox	8 – 7	R. Ramírez (1-1)	Thornton (4–2)	Soria (26)	32,269	45–54
100	July 21	Tigers	19 – 4	Miner (4–3)	Hochevar (6–8)		14,137	45–55
101	July 22	Tigers	7 – 1	Rogers (8–6)	Davies (3–2)		22,074	45–56
102	July 23	Tigers	7 – 1	Galarraga (8–4)	Greinke (7-7)		16,594	45–57
103	July 24	Rays	4 – 2	Meche (8–9)	Garza (8–6)	Soria (27)	25,900	46–57
104	July 25	Rays	5 – 3	Jackson (6–7)	Bannister (7–9)	Percival (21)	31,535	46–58
105	July 26	Rays	5 – 3	Reyes (2-2)	H. Ramírez (1-1)	Percival (22)	24,322	46–59
106	July 27	Rays	6 – 1	Davies (4–2)	Sonnanstine (10–6)		13,779	47–59
107	July 28	@ Athletics	4 – 2	Greinke (8–7)	Braden (2–1)	Soria (28)	12,464	48–59
108	July 29	@ Athletics	5 – 2	Meche (9-9)	Smith (5–10)	Soria (29)	12,182	49–59
109	July 30	@ Athletics	4 – 3 (10)	R. Ramírez (2–1)	Street (2–4)	Soria (30)	26,272	50–59

August

#	Date	Opponent	Score	Win	Loss	Save	Attendance	Record
110	August 1	White Sox	4 – 2	Vázquez (8–9)	Hochevar (6–9)	Jenks (22)	21,291	50–60
111	August 2	White Sox	9 – 7	Davies (5–2)	Buehrle (8–10)	Soria (31)	21,866	51–60
112	August 3	White Sox	14 – 3	Greinke (9–7)	Richard (0–2)		15,268	52–60
113	August 4	Red Sox	4 – 3	Meche (10–9)	Buchholz (2–7)	Soria (32)	24,378	53–60
114	August 5	Red Sox	8 – 2	Beckett (10–8)	Bannister (7–10)		22,069	53–61
115	August 6	Red Sox	8 – 2	Wakefield (7–8)	Hochevar (6–10)		24,294	53–62
116	August 8	Twins	4 – 1	Slowey (8-8)	Davies (5–3)	Nathan (31)	33,653	53–63
117	August 9	Twins	7 – 3	Liriano (2–3)	Greinke (9–8)		27,960	53–64
118	August 10	Twins	5 – 4 (12)	Tejeda (1–2)	Breslow (0–1)		27,960	54–64
119	August 12	@ White Sox	9 – 0	Vázquez (9–10)	Bannister (7–11)		31,099	54–65
120	August 13	@ White Sox	4 – 0	Buehrle (10-10)	Hochevar (6–11)		37,838	54–66
121	August 14	@ White Sox	9 – 2	Broadway (1–0)	Davies (5–4)		32,788	54–67
122	August 15	@ Yankees	4 – 3	Núñez (4–1)	Rivera (4–5)	Soria (33)	53,067	55–67
123	August 16	@ Yankees	3 – 2 (13)	Robertson (3–0)	Fulchino (0–1)		54,180	55–68
124	August 17	@ Yankees	15 – 6	Mussina (16–7)	Bannister (7–12)		54,114	55–69
125	August 19	@ Indians	9 – 4	Reyes (2–1)	Hochevar (6–12)		18,946	55–70
126	August 20	@ Indians	8 – 5	Rincón (3-3)	Soria (1–3)	Lewis (4)	23,920	55–71
127	August 21	@ Indians	10 – 3	Lee (18–2)	Greinke (9-9)		21,391	55–72
128	August 22	Tigers	4 – 3	Verlander (10–13)	Bannister (7–13)	Rodney (6)	18,361	55–73
129	August 23	Tigers	4 – 0	Miner (7–4)	Davies (5-5)		27,346	55–74
130	August 24	Tigers	7 – 3	Duckworth (1–0)	Rogers (9–11)		16,663	56–74
131	August 25	Rangers	9 – 4	Feldman (5-5)	Meche (10-10)		12,399	56–75
132	August 26	Rangers	2 – 1	Millwood (8–7)	R. Ramírez (2-2)		17,004	56–76
133	August 27	Rangers	3 – 2	Harrison (6–3)	Bannister (7–14)	Francisco (1)	12,662	56–77
134	August 29	@ Tigers	6 – 3	Miner (8–4)	Davies (5–6)		40,206	56–78
135	August 30	@ Tigers	13 – 3	Duckworth (2–0)	Rogers (9–12)		40,623	57–78
136	August 31	@ Tigers	4 – 2	Glover (2–3)	Wells (0–1)	Rodney (7)	39,782	57–79

September

#	Date	Opponent	Score	Win	Loss	Save	Attendance	Record
137	September 2	Athletics	5 – 2	Greinke (10–9)	Gonzalez (1–3)	Soria (34)	11,143	58–79
N/A	September 3	Athletics	Postponed (rain) Rescheduled for September 4					
138	September 4	Athletics (doubleheader)	5 – 4 (10)	Soria (2–3)	Devine (4–1)		12,791	59–79
139	September 4	Athletics (doubleheader)	9 – 6	Davies (6-6)	Meyer (0–4)	R. Ramírez (1)	12,791	60–79
140	September 5	Indians	9 – 3	Mujica (2–1)	Duckworth (2–1)		21,107	60–80
141	September 6	Indians	3 – 1	Meche (11–10)	Jackson (0–2)	Soria (35)	18,795	61–80
142	September 7	Indians	3 – 1	Lee (21–2)	Greinke (10-10)	Lewis (8)	15,023	61–81
143	September 9	@ Twins	7 – 2	Blackburn (10–8)	Bannister (7–15)		17,015	61–82
144	September 10	@ Twins	7 – 1	Slowey (12–9)	Davies (6–7)		20,421	61–83
145	September 11	@ Twins	3 – 2 (10)	R. Ramírez (3–2)	Guerrier (6–8)	Soria (36)	20,138	62–83
146	September 12	@ Indians	12 – 5	Lee (22–2)	Meche (11-11)		32,843	62–84
147	September 13	@ Indians (doubleheader)	8 – 3	Greinke (11–10)	Carmona (8–7)		25,783	63–84
148	September 13	@ Indians (doubleheader)	8 – 4	Tejeda (2-2)	Bullington (0–1)	Soria (37)	25,783	64–84
149	September 14	@ Indians	13 – 3	Bannister (8–15)	Mujica (2-2)		29,530	65–84
150	September 15	Mariners	3 – 0	Davies (7-7)	Silva (4–15)	Soria (38)	10,307	66–84
151	September 16	Mariners	6 – 3	Duckworth (3–1)	Morrow (2–4)	Soria (39)	19,135	67–84
152	September 17	Mariners	5 – 2	Meche (12–11)	Corcoran (5–2)	Soria (40)	13,382	68–84
153	September 18	Mariners	12 – 0	Greinke (12–10)	Feierabend (1–4)		14,144	69–84
154	September 19	White Sox	9 – 4	Buehrle (14–11)	Bannister (8–14)		26,049	69–85
155	September 20	White Sox	5 – 2	Davies (8–7)	Floyd (16–8)	Soria (40)	23,754	70–85
156	September 21	White Sox	3 – 0	Danks (11–8)	Duckworth (3–2)	Jenks (29)	16,920	70–86
157	September 22	Tigers	6 – 2	Meche (13–11)	Miner (8–5)		36,428	71–86
158	September 23	Tigers	5 – 0	Greinke (13–10)	García (1-1)		35,121	72–86
159	September 24	Tigers	10 – 4	Bannister (9–16)	Robertson (7–11)		35,899	73–86
160	September 26	@ Twins	8 – 1	Davies (9–7)	Liriano (6–4)		30,674	74–86
161	September 27	@ Twins	4 – 2	Meche (14–11)	Guerrier (6–9)	Soria (42)	38,072	75–86
162	September 28	@ Twins	6 – 0	Baker (11–5)	Duckworth (3-3)		42,942	75–87

== Player stats ==
=== Batting ===
Note: G = Games played; AB = At bats; R = Runs scored; H = Hits; 2B = Doubles; 3B = Triples; HR = Home runs; RBI = Runs batted in; AVG = Batting average; SB = Stolen bases

Player	G	AB	R	H	2B	3B	HR	RBI	AVG	SB
José Guillén	153	598	66	158	42	1	20	97	.264	2
Mark Teahen	149	572	66	146	31	4	15	59	.255	4
David DeJesus	135	518	70	159	25	7	12	73	.307	11
Alex Gordon	134	493	72	128	35	1	16	59	.260	9
Billy Butler	124	443	44	122	22	0	11	55	.275	0
Ross Gload	122	388	46	106	18	1	3	37	.273	3
John Buck	109	370	48	83	23	1	9	48	.224	0
Joey Gathright	105	279	41	71	3	1	0	22	.254	21
Mike Avilés	102	419	68	136	27	4	10	51	.325	8
Tony Peña Jr.	95	225	22	38	4	1	1	14	.169	3
Esteban Germán	89	216	30	53	14	3	0	22	.245	7
Mark Grudzielanek	86	331	36	99	24	0	3	24	.299	2
Miguel Olivo	84	306	29	78	22	0	15	41	.255	7
Alberto Callaspo	74	213	21	65	8	3	0	16	.305	2
Mitch Maier	34	91	9	26	1	1	0	9	.286	0
Jason Smith	22	28	6	6	2	0	0	1	.214	0
Ryan Shealy	20	73	12	22	1	0	7	20	.301	0
Kila Ka'aihue	12	21	4	6	0	0	1	1	.286	0
Ron Mahay	5	0	0	0	0	0	0	0	.000	0
Ramón Ramírez	5	0	0	0	0	0	0	0	.000	0
Joakim Soria	4	0	0	0	0	0	0	0	.000	0
Yasuhiko Yabuta	3	0	0	0	0	0	0	0	.000	0
Zack Greinke	3	7	0	2	1	0	0	0	.286	0
Jimmy Gobble	2	0	0	0	0	0	0	0	.000	0
Jeff Fulchino	2	0	0	0	0	0	0	0	.000	0
Brian Bannister	2	4	0	1	0	0	0	0	.250	0
Carlos Rosa	1	0	0	0	0	0	0	0	.000	0
Leo Núñez	1	0	0	0	0	0	0	0	.000	0
Brett Tomko	1	3	0	0	0	0	0	0	.000	0
Gil Meche	1	4	1	1	0	0	0	1	.250	0
Kyle Davies	1	2	0	0	0	0	0	0	.000	0
Matt Tupman	1	1	0	1	0	0	0	0	1.000	0
Luke Hochevar	1	3	0	0	0	0	0	0	.000	0
Team totals	162	5608	691	1507	303	28	120	650	.269	79

=== Pitching ===
Note: W = Wins; L = Losses; ERA = Earned run average; G = Games pitched; GS = Games started; SV = Saves; IP = Innings pitched; R = Runs allowed; ER = Earned runs allowed; BB = Walks allowed; K = Strikeouts

Player	W	L	ERA	G	GS	SV	IP	R	ER	BB	K
Gil Meche	14	11	3.98	34	34	0	210.1	98	93	73	183
Zack Greinke	13	10	3.47	32	32	0	202.1	87	78	56	183
Kyle Davies	7	7	4.06	21	21	0	113.0	57	51	43	71
Brian Bannister	9	16	5.76	32	32	0	182.2	127	117	58	113
Luke Hochevar	6	12	5.51	22	22	0	129.0	84	79	47	72
Ron Mahay	5	0	3.48	57	0	0	64.2	27	25	29	49
Leo Núñez	4	1	2.98	45	0	0	48.1	19	16	15	26
Brandon Duckworth	3	3	4.50	7	7	0	38.0	20	19	19	20
Ramón Ramírez	3	2	2.64	71	0	1	71.2	23	21	31	70
Joakim Soria	2	3	1.60	63	0	42	67.1	13	12	19	66
Robinson Tejeda	2	2	3.20	25	1	0	39.1	17	14	19	41
Brett Tomko	2	7	6.97	16	10	0	60.2	49	47	13	40
Horacio Ramírez	1	1	2.59	15	0	0	24.1	9	7	1	11
Yasuhiko Yabuta	1	3	4.78	31	0	0	37.2	21	20	17	25
Joel Peralta	1	2	5.98	40	0	0	52.2	37	35	14	38
Devon Lowery	0	0	10.38	5	0	0	4.1	5	5	2	6
Neal Musser	0	0	0.00	1	0	0	1.0	0	0	1	0
Josh Newman	0	0	7.71	4	0	0	7.0	9	6	6	2
Carlos Rosa	0	0	2.70	2	0	0	3.1	1	1	0	3
Tony Peña Jr.	0	0	0.00	1	0	0	1.0	0	0	0	1
John Bale	0	3	4.39	13	3	0	26.2	13	13	6	14
Hideo Nomo	0	0	18.69	3	0	0	4.1	9	9	4	3
Kip Wells	0	1	8.71	10	0	0	10.1	10	10	11	9
Jimmy Gobble	0	2	8.81	39	0	1	31.2	31	31	23	27
Jeff Fulchino	0	1	9.00	12	0	0	14.0	15	14	8	12
Team totals	75	87	4.50	162	162	44	1445.2	781	723	515	1085

== Awards and honors ==
=== Player of the Week ===
April 7–13: Brian Bannister, shared with Raúl Ibañez (Seattle Mariners).
May 12–18: José Guillén.
July 28 – August 3: Mike Avilés, shared with Xavier Nady (New York Yankees).

== Farm system ==
Level	Team	League	Manager
AAA	Omaha Royals	Pacific Coast League	Mike Jirschele
AA	Northwest Arkansas Naturals	Texas League	Brian Poldberg
A	Wilmington Blue Rocks	Carolina League	Darryl Kennedy
A	Burlington Bees	Midwest League	Brian Rupp
Rookie	Burlington Royals	Appalachian League	Tony Tijerina
Rookie	AZL Royals	Arizona League	Julio Bruno
Rookie	Idaho Falls Chukars	Pioneer League	Jim Gabella

LEAGUE CHAMPIONS: Burlington (Midwest)
