= List of people with surname Peña =

This is a list of people with the surname Peña.

== A ==
- Aaron Peña (born 1959), member of the Texas House of Representatives
- Adahisa Peña (born 1983), Miss Venezuela 2008 beauty pageant winner
- Adam de la Peña, American actor, comedy writer, producer, and director
- Adela Peña, American violinist best known as a founding member of the Eroica Trio
- Aketza Peña (born 1981), Spanish professional road bicycle racer
- Alcides Peña (born 1989), Bolivian football striker
- Alcira de la Peña (1910–1998), Argentine physician and political leader
- Alejandra Peña, Venezuelan politician
- Alejandro Peña (born 1959), former Major League Baseball relief pitcher
- Alejandro Peña Esclusa (born 1954), Venezuelan leader of the NGO Fuerza Solidaria and president of the NGO UnoAmérica
- Alfredo Peña (1944–2016), Venezuelan journalist and politician
- Álvaro Peña (born 1965), former football striker
- Ángel Peña (musician) (born 1948), Puerto Rican composer, musician, singer, and record producer
- Ángel Peña (born 1975), Dominican Republican Major League Baseball catcher
- Ángelo Peña (born 1989), Venezuelan footballer
- Antoni Peña (born 1970), retired Spanish male long-distance runner
- Antonio Peña (disambiguation)
- Asier Peña Iturria (born 1977), Spanish long track speed skater

== B ==
- Berny Peña (born 1980), Costa Rican football player
- Brayan Peña (born 1982), Cuban Major League Baseball catcher

== C ==
- Candela Peña (born 1973), Spanish actress
- Carlos Peña (born 1978), Dominican professional baseball first baseman
- Carlos Peña (Spanish footballer) (born 1983), Spanish professional footballer
- Carlos Alberto Peña (born 1990), Mexican professional footballer
- Carlos Peña (singer) (born 1988), Guatemalan singer
- Carlota Garrido de la Peña (1870–1958), Argentine journalist, writer and teacher
- Caupolicán Peña (born 1930), former Chilean professional footballer and coach

== D ==
- Dan Peña (born 1945), Hispanic-American businessman and motivational speaker
- Daniel Peña (engineer) (born 1948), Spanish industrial engineer
- Darwin Peña (born 1977), Bolivian football midfielder
- Diómedes Peña (born 1976), Colombian football player
- Dorian Peña (born 1977), Filipino American professional basketball player

== E ==
- Elizabeth Peña (1959–2014), American actress
- Ellen Hart Peña (born 1958), former world-class runner and lawyer
- Elvis Peña (born 1974), former Dominican Republican Major League Baseball second baseman
- Enrique Peña Nieto (born 1966), former President of Mexico (2012–2018)
- Enrique Peña Sánchez (1880–1922), Cuban cornet player, orchestra leader and composer

== F ==
- Fabián Peña (born 1973), Mexican football midfielder
- Federico Peña (born 1947), former United States Secretary of Transportation and United States Secretary of Energy
- Feliciano Peña (1915–1982), Mexican painter, sculptor and engraver
- Felipe Peña Biafore (born 2001), Argentine footballer
- Félix de la Peña, governor of Córdoba Province, Argentina
- Félix Peña (born 1990), Dominican professional baseball pitcher
- Florencia Peña (born 1974), Argentine actress
- Francisco Peña (c. 1540–1612), Spanish canon lawyer
- Francisco Peña Romero (born 1978), Spanish footballer
- Frank Peña (born 1971), Mexican-American professional boxer

== G ==
- George de la Peña (born c. 1955), American ballet dancer, musical theatre performer
- Gerónimo Peña (born 1967), retired professional baseball second base man
- Gonzalo Peña (born 1989), Spanish actor
- Guillermo Gómez-Peña (born c.1978), Mexican performance artist, writer, activist, and educator
- Gustavo Peña (1942–2021), retired Mexican footballer

== H ==
- Hipólito Peña (born 1964), former Dominican Republican Major League Baseball pitcher
- Horacio de la Peña (born 1966), Argentine tennis coach and a former tennis player
- Horacio Peña (actor) (born 1936), Argentine actor
- Horacio Peña (author) (born 1936), professor, writer, and poet

== I ==
- Ignacio Peña, Puerto Rican singer/songwriter
- Iván de la Peña (born 1976), Spanish footballer

== J ==
- Jason de la Pêna (born 1972), English journalist and news presenter
- Jennifer Peña (born 1983), three-time Grammy-nominated singer and actress
- Jeremy Peña (born 1997), Dominican-American baseball player
- Jesús Peña (born 1975), former Dominican Republican relief pitcher in Major League Baseball
- Jharome Peña, Filipino professional pool player
- Jorge Peña Hen (1928–1973), Chilean composer
- José Peña (baseball) (born 1942), former Mexican pitcher in Major League Baseball
- José Peña (sprinter) (born 1979), Venezuelan track and field sprinter
- José Peña (steeplechaser) (born 1987), Venezuelan steeplechase athlete
- Jose Encarnacion Peña (1902–1979), San Ildefonso Pueblo painter.
- José Enrique de la Peña (1807–1840), colonel in the Mexican Army
- José María Peña (1895–1989), Spanish professional association football player
- José Francisco Peña Gómez (1937–1998), politician from the Dominican Republic
- Jose Peña Suazo (born 1967), Dominican Republican Latin singer
- Juan Manuel Peña (born 1973), Bolivian footballer
- Juan Peña (baseball) (born 1977), former Major League Baseball starting pitcher
- Julianna Peña (born 1989), mixed martial artist

== K ==
- Karell Peña (born 1989), Cuban beach volleyball player
- Kelvin dela Peña (born 1984), Filipino professional basketball athlete

== L ==
- Lorena Peña (born 1955), Salvadoran politician
- Lorenzo Peña (born 1944), Spanish philosopher, lawyer, logician and political thinker
- Louis Angelo Peña (born 1989), Venezuelan footballer
- Lucilo de la Peña (born 1921), Cuban Olympic fencer
- Luis Peña (1918–1977), Spanish actor
- Luis Sáenz Peña (1822–1907), President of Argentina (1892–1895)

== M ==
- Manuel de la Peña y Peña (1789–1850), interim Mexican president September to November 1847 and president January 1848 to June 1848
- Manuel la Peña (1808–1811), or Lapeña, Spanish military officer served in the Peninsular War
- Marcelo Peña (born 1975), former Chilean professional footballer and coach
- Marco Peña, guitarist for the American rock band The Ataris
- Marcos Peña (born 1977), Argentine politician
- Mario Peña (1952–2008), Peruvian politician
- Marisol Peña (born 1960), Chilean judge
- Michael Peña (born 1976), American film and television actor
- Miguel Peña (disambiguation), several people
- Miles Peña, Cuban salsa musician
- Miriam Peña Cárdenas, Chilean-Mexican astronomer

== N ==
- Nicolás Rodriguez Peña (1775–1853), Argentine politician

== O ==
- Orlando Peña (musician) (1928–1994), Cuban musician and composer
- Orlando Peña (born 1933), former Cuban Major League Baseball pitcher

== P ==
- Pablo Peña (born 1955), former Bolivian football referee
- Pachu Peña (born 1962), Argentine comedian
- Paco Peña (born 1942), Spanish flamenco guitarist
- Paul Pena (1950–2005), American singer, songwriter and guitarist
- Pedro Peña (politician) (1864–1943), provisional President of Paraguay in 1912

== R ==
- Ralph Peña, founding member and the current artistic director of Ma-Yi Theater Company
- Ramiro Peña (born 1985), Mexican Major League Baseball infielder
- Ramón Peña (born 1962), retired Dominican Republic Major League Baseball relief pitcher
- Raymundo Joseph Peña (1934–2021), American Roman Catholic bishop
- René Peña, Cuban artist specializing in photography
- Richard Peña (born 1953), American film program director of the prestigious Film Society of Lincoln Center
- Roberto Carlos Peña (born 1984), Colombian footballer
- Roberto Peña (1937–1982), former Major League Baseball shortstop
- Roque Sáenz Peña (1851–1914), President of Argentina (1910–1914)

== S ==
- Santiago Peña (born 1978), 52nd President of Paraguay.

== T ==
- Tony Peña (pitcher) (born 1982), Major League Baseball pitcher
- Tony Peña Jr. (born 1981), Dominican professional baseball pitcher
- Tony Peña (born 1957), former professional baseball player
- Tori Pena (born 1987), Irish American pole vaulter
- Trebor Pena (born 2002), American football player

== V ==
- Vicky Peña (born 1954), Catalan television, cinema, theatre and voice actress
- Víctor Hugo Peña (born 1974), Colombian professional road racing cyclist

== W ==
- William Merriweather Peña (1919–2018), American architect
- Wily Mo Peña (born 1982), former Major League Baseball player
