= José Peña =

José Peña may refer to:

- José Enrique Peña (born 1963), Uruguayan footballer
- José Ángel Peña (born 1994), Salvadoran footballer
- José Enrique de la Peña (1807–1840), colonel in the Mexican Army
- José Francisco Peña Gómez (1937–1998), politician from the Dominican Republic
- José Peña (steeplechaser) (born 1987), Venezuelan steeplechase athlete
- José María Peña (1895–1988), Spanish professional association football player
- José Peña (Bolivian footballer) (born 1968), Bolivian football manager and former player
- José Peña (baseball) (born 1942), former Mexican pitcher in Major League Baseball
- José Peña (sprinter) (born 1979), Venezuelan track and field sprinter
- José Peña Suazo (born 1967), Dominican Republican Latin singer

== See also ==
- List of people with surname Peña
