= Ramón Ramírez (Dominican pitcher) =

Dominican baseball player (born 1981)

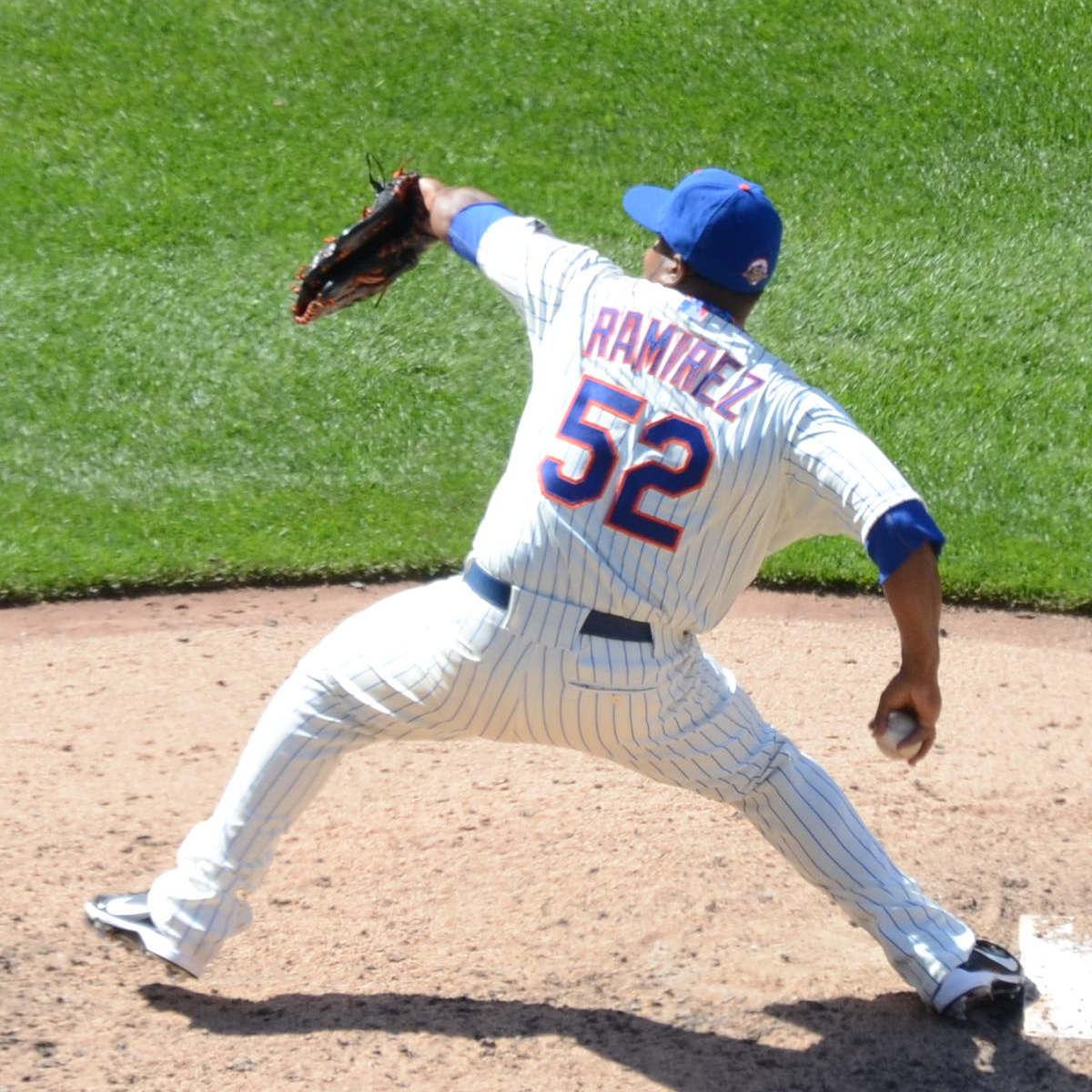
- Ramirez with the New York Mets in 2012
- Pitcher
- Born: August 31, 1981 (age 45); Puerto Plata, Dominican Republic
- Batted: Right Threw: Right

Professional debut
- NPB: 2002, for the Hiroshima Toyo Carp
- MLB: April 14, 2006, for the Colorado Rockies

Last appearance
- NPB: 2002, for the Hiroshima Toyo Carp
- MLB: June 30, 2014, for the Baltimore Orioles

NPB statistics
- Win–loss record: 0–0
- Earned run average: 3.00
- Strikeouts: 3
- WHIP: 1.66

MLB statistics
- Win–loss record: 23-21
- Earned run average: 3.42
- Strikeouts: 364
- WHIP: 1.29
- Stats at Baseball Reference

Teams
- Hiroshima Toyo Carp (2002); Colorado Rockies (2006–2007); Kansas City Royals (2008); Boston Red Sox (2009–2010); San Francisco Giants (2010–2011); New York Mets (2012); San Francisco Giants (2013); Baltimore Orioles (2014)

Career highlights and awards
- World Series champion (2010)

Ramón Emilio Ramírez (born August 31, 1981) is a Dominican former professional baseball pitcher. He pitched in Nippon Professional Baseball (NPB) for the Hiroshima Toyo Carp, and in Major League Baseball (MLB) for the Colorado Rockies, Kansas City Royals, Boston Red Sox, San Francisco Giants, New York Mets, and Baltimore Orioles.

Ramírez was signed by the Texas Rangers in 1996, as an infielder. After one season in their minor leagues, he was released. He spent the next three years learning how to pitch before joining the Hiroshima Toyo Carp's Dominican academy in 2000. He pitched in two games with the Carp in 2002 and was signed by the New York Yankees in 2003. He spent two and a half years in their minor leagues before getting traded to the Rockies in the middle of the 2005 season. Shortly after the 2006 season started, Ramírez was called up by the Rockies, and he went on to have a successful rookie season for them. In 2007, he had an 8.31 earned run average (ERA) with the Rockies and spent time on the disabled list and in the minor leagues. Before the 2008 season, he was traded to the Royals. After one season with them, he was traded to the Red Sox. In 2009, his seven wins were tied for third among relief pitchers in the American League. After an inconsistent start to the 2010 season, Ramírez was traded to the San Francisco Giants. He posted a 0.67 ERA with the Giants, helping them reach the playoffs. He gave up runs in four of the five playoff games he pitched in, but the Giants won their first World Series since 1954. In 2011, Ramírez posted a career-best 2.62 ERA and was traded to the Mets after the season.

== Early life ==
Ramón Emilio Ramírez was born on August 31, 1981, in Puerto Plata, Dominican Republic.

== Professional career ==
=== Texas Rangers ===
On December 27, 1996, the Texas Rangers signed Ramírez as an infielder, believing him to be 16 instead of 15. After one season with their Dominican affiliate, he was released on June 4, 1998.

=== Hiroshima Toyo Carp (2002) ===
After being released by the Rangers, Ramírez got a job at a Coca-Cola bottling plant while learning how to pitch. In 2000, he attended the Hiroshima Toyo Carp's academy in the Dominican Republic, and he appeared in two games for the Carp in 2002. He gave up one run in three innings while striking out three batters and walking two, and he was posted in 2003. The winning bid was placed by the New York Yankees, who signed him on March 5, 2003, and assigned him to their minor league system.

=== New York Yankees ===
Ramírez began his minor league career in 2003 with the Tampa Yankees of the single-A advanced Florida State League. After he had a 2–8 record, a 5.21 earned run average (ERA), 21 strikeouts, and 21 1/3 innings pitched in 14 starts, he was promoted to the Trenton Thunder of the Double-A Eastern League. With the Thunder, he had a 1–1 record, a 1.69 ERA, 21 strikeouts, and 21 1/3 innings pitched in four games (three starts), and this earned him a promotion to the Columbus Clippers of the triple-A International League. In two games (one start) with Columbus, he had an 0–1 record, a 4.50 ERA, five strikeouts, and six innings pitched. He finished his first minor league season with a 3–10 record, a 4.43 ERA, 96 strikeouts, and 101 2/3 innings pitched in 20 games (18 starts).

In 2004, Ramírez began the year with Columbus. After he had an 0–3 record, an 8.50 ERA, 17 strikeouts, and 18 innings pitched in four starts, he was demoted to Trenton on May 1. On August 17, he allowed just two hits in a 4–1 complete game victory over the Norwich Navigators while setting a team record by retiring the last 24 hitters he faced. With Trenton, Ramírez had a 4–6 record, a 4.62 ERA, two complete games, 128 strikeouts, and 115 innings pitched in 18 starts. His combined minor league totals were a 4–9 record, a 5.14 ERA, two complete games, 145 strikeouts, and 133 innings pitched in 22 starts.

Ramírez began the 2005 season with Columbus again. After he had a 1–3 record, a 5.33 ERA, 23 strikeouts, and 25 1/3 innings pitched in six starts for the Clippers, he was demoted to Trenton for the second year in a row. At Trenton, he had a 6–5 record, a 3.84 ERA, 82 strikeouts, and 89 innings pitched in 15 starts.

=== Colorado Rockies ===
==== Minor leagues ====
On July 28, 2005, the Yankees traded Ramírez and Eduardo Sierra to the Colorado Rockies in exchange for Shawn Chacón.

After being acquired by the Rockies, Ramírez was assigned to the Tulsa Drillers of the Double-A Texas League. He made three starts with the Drillers before getting moved to the bullpen. In 9 games (3 starts) with Tulsa, Ramírez had a 2–1 record, a 5.33 ERA, 23 strikeouts, and 25 1/3 innings pitched. His combined minor league totals were a 9–9 record, a 4.39 ERA, 131 strikeouts, and 141 1/3 innings pitched.

Ramírez began 2006 with the Colorado Springs Sky Sox of the Triple-A Pacific Coast League.

==== Major leagues ====
After throwing a scoreless inning for Colorado Springs, he was called up by the Rockies on April 12 when Mike DeJean was placed on the disabled list. He made his debut on April 14, pitching two scoreless innings in a 10–8 loss to the Philadelphia Phillies. Five days later, he singled against Chan Ho Park in his first major league at bat in a 13–4 loss to the San Diego Padres. On April 25, he pitched 2 1/3 scoreless innings and got his first major league win in a 7–6 victory over the Phillies. Ramírez began his career with 15 1/3 scoreless innings in 11 games, which set a Rockies record for longest streak by a reliever to begin a career. It was the longest streak by a reliever to start a career since Jeremy Fikac threw 16 scoreless innings to start his career in 2001. Ramírez's streak ended on May 15, when he allowed three runs in 1/3 of an inning and got his first career loss against the Los Angeles Dodgers, who won 5–4. On August 15, he set a career high with four innings pitched in the longest game in Rockies history, an 18-inning game against the Arizona Diamondbacks. He gave up a run in the 18th and suffered a loss in the 2–1 defeat. He had a 2.88 ERA in his first 47 games, but he posted a 5.09 ERA over his final 14 games, raising his season ERA to 3.46. On September 30, in his final game of the season, he pitched 1 2/3 scoreless innings and got the win in a 14-inning, 11–9 victory over the Chicago Cubs. Ramírez finished the season with a 4–3 record, a 3.46 ERA, 61 strikeouts, and 67 2/3 innings pitched in 61 games. His 61 games were the third-most by a Rockies' rookie pitcher, behind Steve Reed (64 in 1993) and Javier López (75 in 2003).

Ramírez began the 2007 season with seven straight scoreless appearances for the Rockies. On April 21, he was placed on the disabled list (DL) (retroactive to May 18) with a sprained right elbow. He returned from the DL on May 15. After stretching his scoreless start to eight games, he posted a 22.24 ERA over his next seven games. On May 20, he gave up a career-high five runs in 2/3 innings and got the loss in a 10–5 defeat to the Kansas City Royals. On June 7, he was optioned to Colorado Springs as Josh Fogg came off the disabled list. Ramírez was recalled on July 20 to replace Tom Martin, who was designated for assignment. After six games, he was returned to Colorado Springs as Ryan Speier was called up. A week later, he was recalled when Willy Taveras was placed on the disabled list, but he was returned to the minors two days later after appearing in one game. On September 8, he was called up and placed on the 60-day disabled list with elbow inflammation so the Rockies could put Josh Newman on their roster. Ramírez finished the season with a 2–2 record, an 8.31 ERA, 15 strikeouts, and 17 1/3 innings pitched in 22 games. He did not allow an earned run in 11 road games, but he had a 17.28 ERA in 11 games at Coors Field. Although he did not pitch in the playoffs for the Rockies at all (since he was injured), he was still presented with an NL Championship ring. At Colorado Springs, Ramírez had a 4–0 record, a 2.28 ERA, 35 strikeouts, and 27 2/3 innings pitched in 25 games.

=== Kansas City Royals (2008) ===
Ramírez was traded to the Kansas City Royals on March 26, 2008, for a player to be named later (Jorge de la Rosa). He posted a 0.66 ERA through his first 13 games with the Royals, but his ERA rose to 3.49 after he posted a 6.14 ERA in his next 13 games. Over his final 45 games, he had a 2.08 ERA. On June 25, in a 7–3 victory over Colorado (his former team), Ramírez threw two pitches behind Yorvit Torrealba of the Rockies. Ramírez said he was not trying to hit Torrealba, and he was not ejected from the game or disciplined, but some of the Rockies players claimed that Ramírez had thrown at Torrealba intentionally. On July 20, he got his first win since May 21 of the previous year in an 8–7 victory over the Chicago White Sox, despite blowing the lead by giving up two runs in 1 1/3 innings. Ten days later, he pitched 1 1/3 scoreless innings and was charged with the win in a 4–3 victory over the Oakland Athletics, helping the Royals sweep the Athletics in Oakland for the first time since 1988. By September, he had replaced Ron Mahay as Joakim Soria's setup man. He pitched in 71 games for the Royals with a 2.64 ERA. On September 4, in the second game of a doubleheader, Ramírez notched his first career save against the Athletics in a 9–6 victory. Ramírez finished the year with a 3–2 record, a 2.64 ERA, one save, 70 strikeouts, and 71 2/3 innings pitched in 71 games. He was one of three major league pitchers to give up two or fewer home runs in over 70 innings (along with Roy Corcoran and Jason Grilli), and he was one of the American League (AL) pitchers to have an ERA under 3.00 with at least 70 innings pitched and 70 strikeouts (along with Francisco Rodríguez and Matt Thornton).

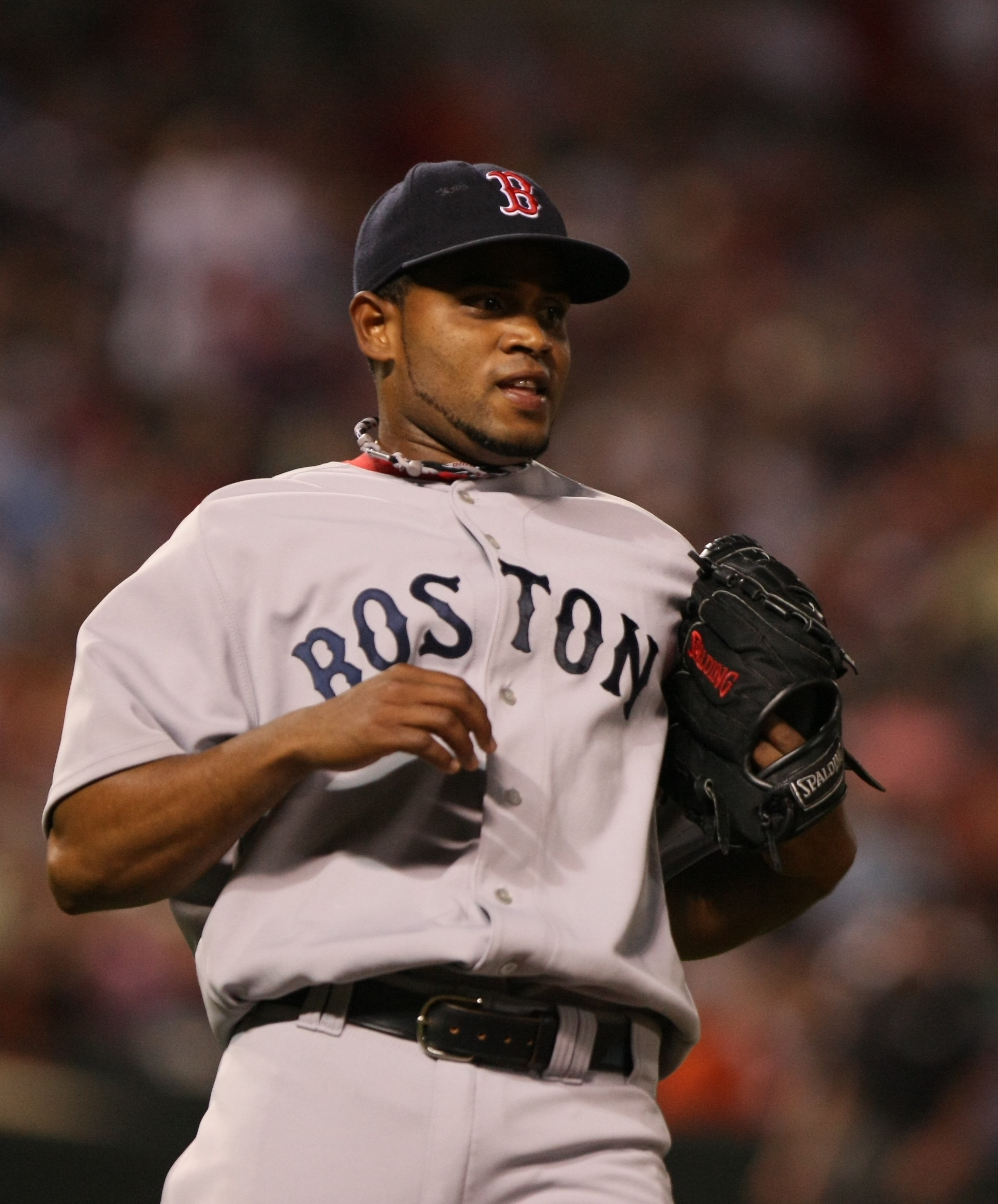
Ramírez during his tenure with the Red Sox

=== Boston Red Sox (2009–2010) ===
On November 19, 2008, Ramírez was traded to the Boston Red Sox for outfielder Coco Crisp. On April 24, 2009, he pitched a scoreless inning for the Red Sox and earned the win in an 11-inning 5–4 victory over the New York Yankees. He began his Red Sox tenure with 15 straight scoreless innings spanning 13 games from April 8 to May 3. On May 14, he pitched a season-high 2 2/3 innings, giving up no runs in a 12-inning, 5–4 loss to the Los Angeles Angels of Anaheim. He struck out a season-high four batters and allowed a run in 1 2/3 innings on July 9 in an 8–6 loss to the Royals. Ramírez finished the season with a 7–4 record, a 2.84 ERA, 52 strikeouts, and 69 2/3 innings pitched. His seven wins were tied for third among AL relief pitchers and trailed only Alfredo Aceves (10) and Craig Breslow (8). Ramírez reached the playoffs for the first time in his career, as the Red Sox won the Wild Card. In Game 1 of the American League Division Series (ALDS), he gave up two runs without recording an out in his only playoff appearance, a 5–0 loss to the Angels. The Angels went on to sweep the Red Sox in three games.

On April 27, 2010, Ramírez got his first save since 2008 in a 2–1 win over the Baltimore Orioles, since Red Sox manager Terry Francona wanted to rest closer Jonathan Papelbon. He was charged with a loss on July 20 after pitching 1 1/3 innings when Michael Bowden allowed an inherited runner to score in the 10th inning of a 5–4 loss to the Athletics. Two days later, he got a save in a 13-inning, 8–6 win over the Seattle Mariners. Ramírez had an 0–3 record, a 4.46 ERA, 2 saves, 31 strikeouts, and 41 2/3 innings pitched with the Red Sox through July 31, the trade deadline. That day, he was traded to the San Francisco Giants for Dan Turpen.

=== San Francisco Giants (2010–2011) ===
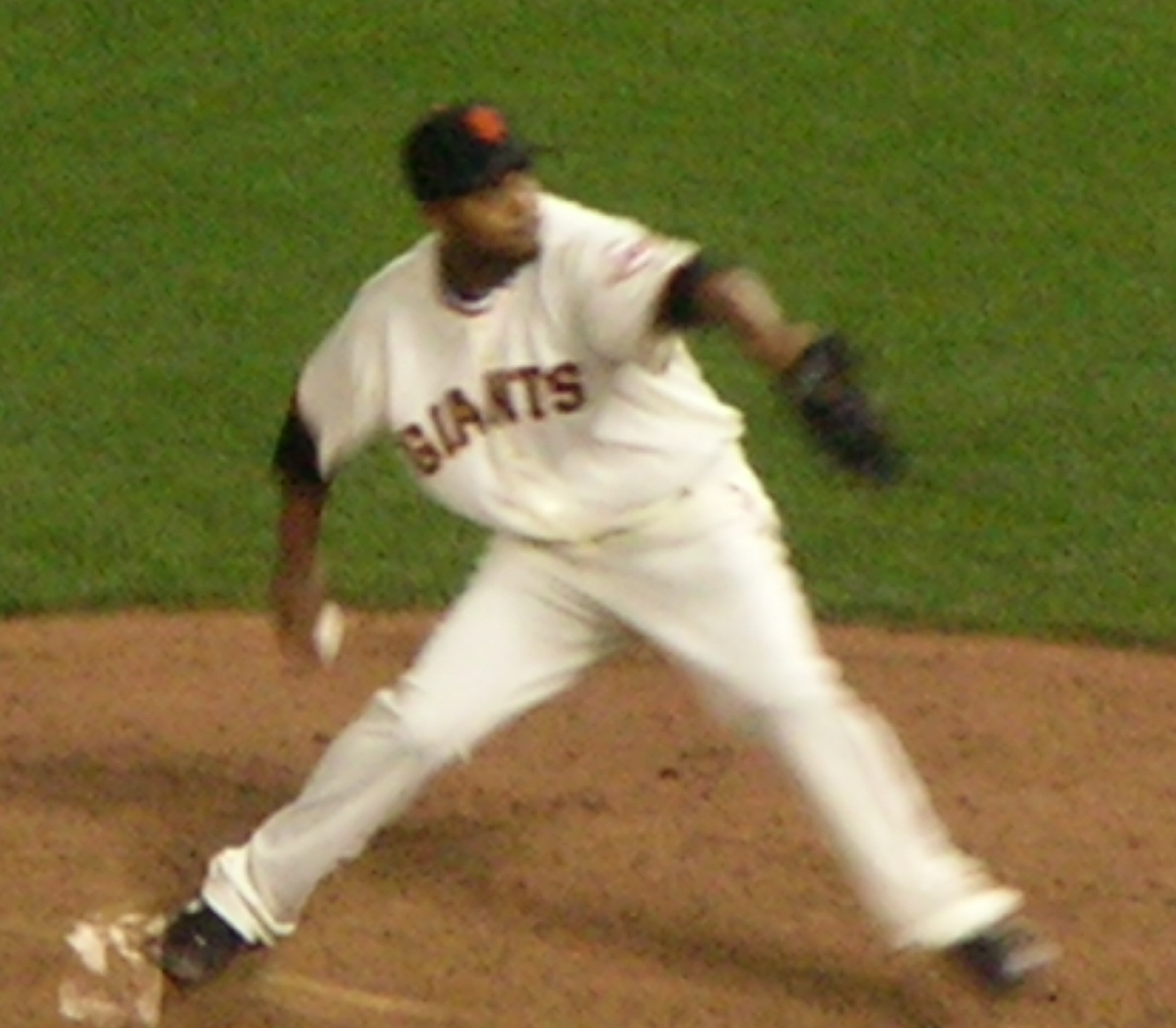
Ramírez throwing a pitch

Ramírez got his only win of the year by pitching a scoreless inning on September 21 in a 1–0 victory over the Chicago Cubs. He got a save against the Arizona Diamondbacks on September 30, since San Francisco Giants' manager Bruce Bochy wanted to rest closer Brian Wilson, in a 4–1 victory. Ramírez posted a 1–0 record, an 0.67 ERA, 15 strikeouts, and 27 innings pitched in 25 games for the Giants as they won the National League (NL) West and reached the playoffs for the first time since 2003. For the entire season, Ramírez had a 1–3 record, a 2.99 ERA, 46 strikeouts, and 69 1/3 innings pitched in 69 games. Ramírez's only appearance in the NLDS against the Atlanta Braves came in Game 2 on October 8, when he gave up a home run to Rick Ankiel in the 11th inning and was charged with a loss (the Giants' only loss of the series) in the 5–4 defeat. In Game 2 of the NL Championship Series, Ramírez gave up two runs in 1/3 of an inning as the Giants lost 6–1 to the Phillies. In Game 5, the Giants' other loss in the series, he gave up a run in 2/3 innings as the Giants lost 4–2. On October 27, in Game 1 of the World Series, he gave up two runs in 1/3 inning, but the Giants defeated the Texas Rangers 11–7. He pitched 2/3 scoreless innings in Game 3 on October 30, but the Giants lost 4–2. However, that was the Giants' only loss of the series, as they defeated Texas in five games and won their first World Series since 1954.

Ramírez earned a save on April 6, 2011, by pitching 1/3 of an inning to escape a bases-loaded situation in the San Francisco Giants' 8–4 win over the Padres. On June 18, he pitched a season-high 2 1/3 innings, allowing no runs in a 4–2 loss to the Oakland Athletics. He allowed a season-high four runs in 2/3 innings and took the loss on June 30 in an 11-inning, 5–2 defeat to the Chicago Cubs. On August 5, in an eventual 9–2 loss to the Philadelphia Phillies, Ramírez hit Shane Victorino with a pitch, and a brawl started. Ramírez was subsequently ejected from the game. Afterwards, Philadelphia talk-show host Tony Bruno sparked controversy by posting on his Twitter account that Ramírez was an illegal alien, although he later removed the post. On September 4, Ramírez struck out four batters but gave up a run in 1 2/3 innings in a 4–1 loss to the Arizona Diamondbacks. Two days later, he got his final save of the year when he threw a scoreless 1/3 of an inning in a 6–4 victory over the San Diego Padres. In 66 games that season, Ramírez had a 3–3 record, a 2.62 ERA, four saves, 66 strikeouts, and 68 2/3 innings pitched.

=== New York Mets (2012) ===
On December 7, 2011, the Giants traded Ramírez and Andrés Torres to the New York Mets for Ángel Pagán. Ramírez avoided arbitration with the Mets by signing a one-year, $2.65 million contract with them on January 17, 2012. He became a free agent following the season.

=== Second stint with San Francisco Giants (2013) ===
Ramírez signed a minor league contract with the Giants in 2013, but he was released on March 22 after posting an 11.25 ERA in spring training. He was re-signed and appeared in 6 games for the Giants before being designated for assignment. Ramírez was released on June 17.

=== Tampa Bay Rays ===
On July 1, 2013, Ramírez signed a minor league contract with the Tampa Bay Rays. He posted a 2.84 ERA with 7 strikeouts in 6 games for the Triple-A Durham Bulls, and also made one appearances for the High-A Charlotte Stone Crabs. Ramírez was released by the Rays organization on August 1.

=== Seattle Mariners ===
On January 2, 2014, Ramírez signed a minor league contract with the Seattle Mariners. On April 29, he was released after allowing 5 runs in less than 5 innings for the Triple-A Tacoma Rainiers.

=== Baltimore Orioles (2014) ===
On May 30, 2014, Ramírez signed a minor league contract with the Baltimore Orioles. On June 30, Ramírez made his Orioles debut in the ninth inning against the Texas Rangers, relieving Ubaldo Jiménez after pitching 8 innings only allowing 1 run pass. This was not a save opportunity since the Orioles were winning 7–1 in Baltimore. He allowed one walk and had two strikeouts. Ramírez had never met Orioles manager Buck Showalter before his debut with the Orioles. He was designated for assignment on July 6. Ramírez elected free agency on November 3.

=== Toros de Tijuana ===
On February 18, 2015, Ramírez signed with the Tigres de Quintana Roo of the Mexican League. He was released on March 31, without appearing in a game.

On April 2, 2015, Ramírez signed with the Toros de Tijuana of the Mexican League. In 31 appearances for Tijuana, he logged a 3–5 record and 3.31 ERA with 41 strikeouts and 15 saves across 35 1/3 innings pitched.

=== Tigres de Quintana Roo (second stint) ===
On July 15, 2015, Ramírez was traded back to the Tigres de Quintana Roo. In 13 games for Quintana Roo, he posted an 0–1 record and 3.29 ERA with 9 strikeouts over 13 2/3 innings of relief.

=== Los Angeles Angels of Anaheim ===
On December 13, 2015, Ramírez signed a minor league contract with the Los Angeles Angels of Anaheim. He made 13 appearances for the Triple-A Salt Lake Bees, posting a 2–0 record and 5.40 ERA with 21 strikeouts across 23 1/3 innings pitched. Ramírez was released by the Angels organization on May 28, 2016.

=== Tigres de Quintana Roo (third stint) ===
On June 9, 2016, Ramírez signed with the Tigres de Quintana Roo of the Mexican League. In 26 appearances for Quintana Roo, he compiled a 2–1 record and 2.25 ERA with 23 strikeouts and 17 saves over 27 innings of relief. Ramírez was released by the Tigres on March 29, 2017.

=== Sultanes de Monterrey ===
On June 1, 2017, Ramírez signed with the Sultanes de Monterrey of the Mexican League. In 21 games for Monterrey, he pitched to a 2–1 record and 2.29 ERA with 17 strikeouts and one save across 19 2/3 innings pitched. Ramírez was released by the Sultanes on July 10.

=== Vaqueros Unión Laguna ===
On July 11, 2017, Ramírez signed with the Vaqueros Unión Laguna of the Mexican League. In 17 appearances for Unión Laguna, registering a 2–2 record and 3.60 ERA with 9 strikeouts and 4 saves across 20 innings pitched. Ramírez was released by the Vaqueros on February 1, 2018.

== Pitching style ==
Ramírez throws three pitches: a fastball, a changeup, and a slider. His fastball ranges from 92 to 94 mph, and Ramírez considers it his best pitch. His changeup and slider have been described as "above-average" on scouting reports.

== Personal life ==
Ramírez is friends with José Mesa. Mesa helped teach Ramírez English, helped teach him how to pitch, and translated for him in 2006 while both were with the Rockies. After Mesa signed with the Detroit Tigers in 2007, Ramírez still remained in contact with him. Ramírez enjoys Christian music, and he sings it at his house. He often donates baseball equipment to children who need it, and in 2006 the Rockies recognized him for this by making him their Roberto Clemente Award nominee.
