= Sueña =

Sueña may refer to:

- "Sueña", Spanish version of the 1996 Disney song "Someday" (Disney song), performed by Luis Miguel
- "Sueña", 2002 song by Intocable
- "Sueña", 2004 song by La Banda Gorda
- "Sueña", 2012 song by Jencarlos Canela
- "Sueña", 2016 song by Sofia Carson
