= Devon Lowery =

American baseball player (born 1983)

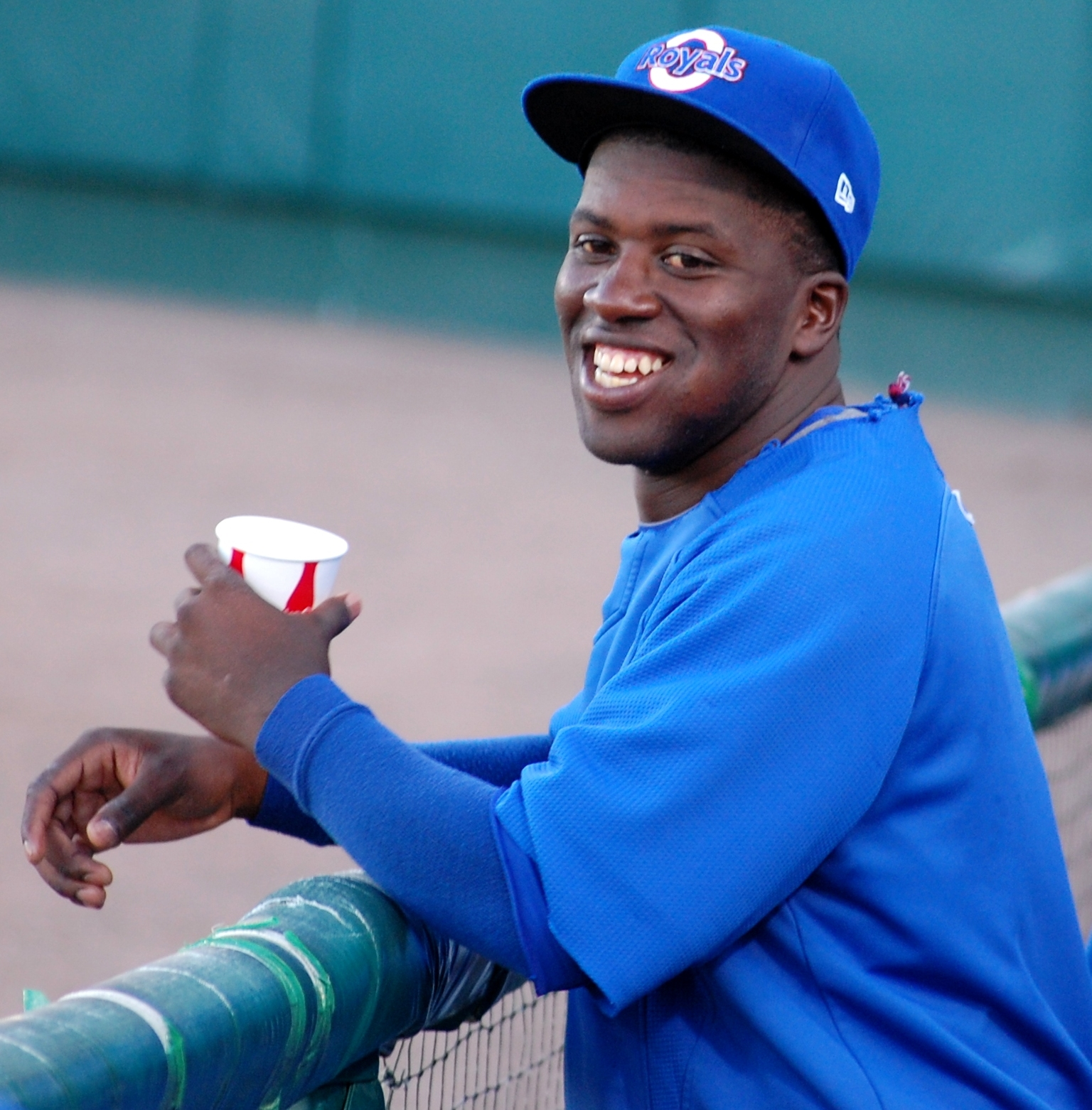
- Lowery with the Omaha Royals in 2010
- Relief pitcher
- Born: March 24, 1983 (age 43); Lincolnton, North Carolina, U.S.
- Batted: Left Threw: Right

MLB debut
- September 5, 2008, for the Kansas City Royals

Last MLB appearance
- September 28, 2008, for the Kansas City Royals

MLB statistics
- Win–loss record: 0–0
- Earned run average: 10.38
- Strikeouts: 6
- Stats at Baseball Reference

Teams
- Kansas City Royals (2008)

Devon Eugene Lowery (born March 24, 1983) is an American former professional baseball pitcher, who played for the Kansas City Royals in 2008.

== Professional career ==
Lowery was drafted by the Kansas City Royals in the 14th round (415th overall) of the 2001 Major League Baseball draft, out of South Point High School in Belmont, North Carolina. After seven years in the minors, he was called up for the first time on September 1, 2008. He made his major league debut on September 6 against the Cleveland Indians, tossing a scoreless inning and striking out two batters. Lowery recorded a 10.38 ERA in five September games.

After retiring from baseball, Lowery became a coach in the Royals' farm system.
