= Marcelo Peña =

Chilean footballer and manager (born 1975)

Personal information
- Full name: Eduardo Marcelo Peña Bustamante
- Date of birth: 30 June 1975 (age 51)
- Place of birth: Chile
- Height: 1.78 m (5 ft 10 in)
- Position: Centre back

Youth career
- Marconi Stallions

Senior career*
| Years | Team | Apps | (Gls) |
| 1993 | Universidad Católica | | |
| 1994–1998 | Audax Italiano | | |
| 1999 | Santiago Morning | | |
| 2000 | Everton | | |
| 2001 | Colo-Colo | | |
| 2002–2003 | Unión Española | | |
| 2004 | Persija Jakarta | | |
| 2005 | Bentleigh Greens | | |
| 2005 | Deportes Concepción | | |

International career
| 1998 | Chile B | 1 | (0) |

Managerial career
- 2009: Argentinos Juniors (assistant)
- 2010: Boca Juniors (assistant)
- 2011: Rangers
- 2012: Universidad de Chile (youth)
- * Club domestic league appearances and goals

Eduardo Marcelo Peña Bustamante (born 30 June 1975), known as Marcelo Peña, is a Chilean football manager and former player.

== Early life ==
After being born in Chile, Peña emigrated with his family to Australia when he was a year old. He grew up in the western suburbs of Sydney.

== Club career ==
Peña played his junior football with Marconi before moving back to Chile at the age of 17. He made his debut for Católica at the age of 18. He later had stints with Colo-Colo, Santiago Morning, Audax Italiano, Unión Española and Everton de Viña del Mar.

In 2005, he had a short stint with Bentleigh Greens in the Victorian Premier League in Australia.

== International career ==
Peña played for Chile B against England B on 10 February 1998. Chile won by 2–1.

== Coaching career ==
Peña worked as coach for the youth team of Universidad de Chile and as manager of Rangers de Talca in the Primera B de Chile. Also, he has been an assistant of Claudio Borghi for Argentinos Juniors and Boca Juniors.

== Personal life ==
His son, Sebastián, is a footballer who was with the Universidad de Chile youth ranks and next moved to Australia and joined Macarthur Rams, winning the 2022 NSW League Two. His son, Marco, was with Universidad de Chile, Barnechea, Colo Colo and Unión Española before joining Australian club Tigers FC in 2024.
