= Miguel Olivo =

Dominican baseball player (born 1978)

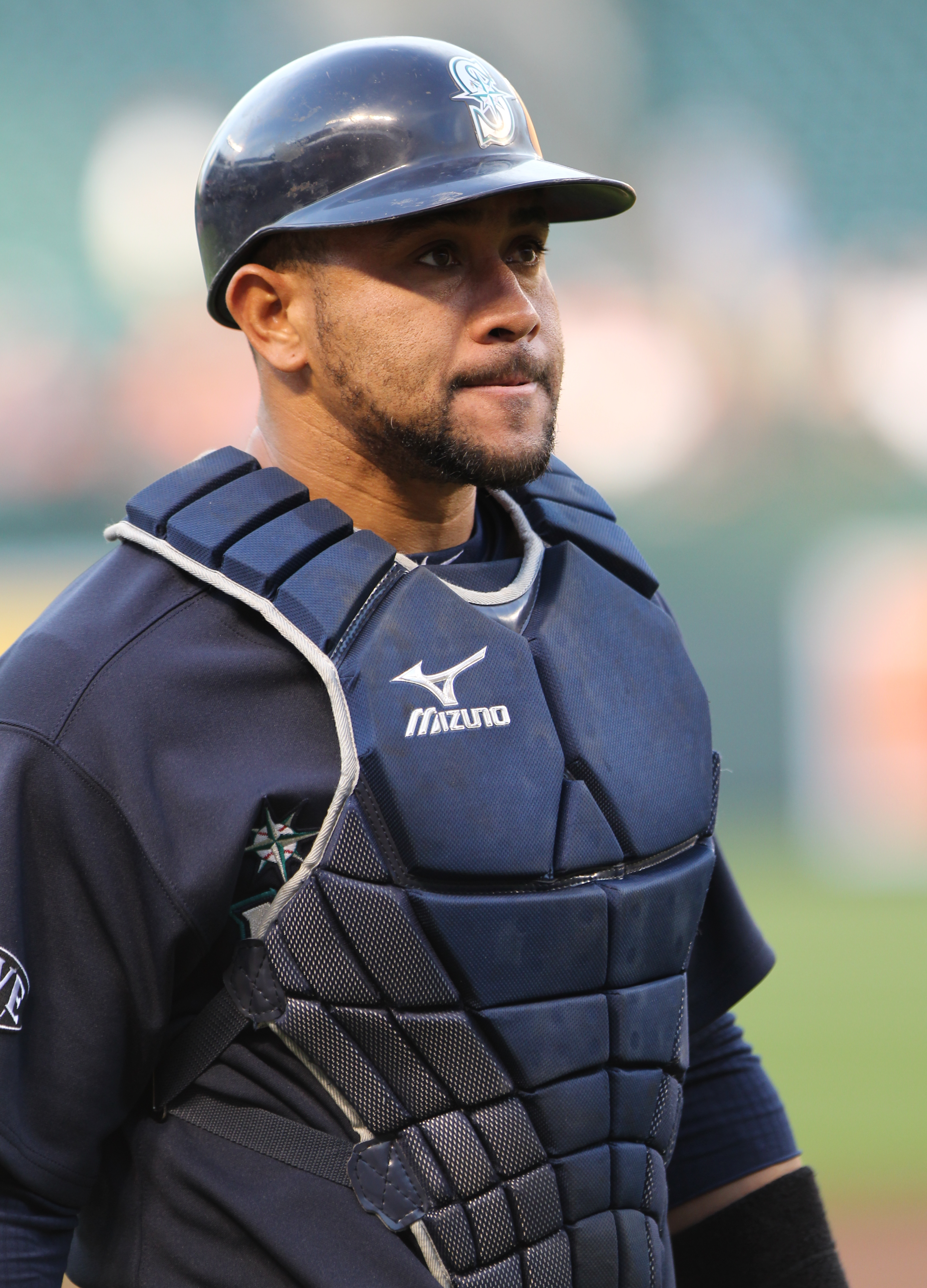
- Olivo with the Seattle Mariners in 2011
- Catcher
- Born: July 15, 1978 (age 48); Villa Vásquez, Dominican Republic
- Batted: Right Threw: Right

MLB debut
- September 15, 2002, for the Chicago White Sox

Last MLB appearance
- May 11, 2014, for the Los Angeles Dodgers

MLB statistics
- Batting average: .240
- Home runs: 145
- Runs batted in: 490
- Stats at Baseball Reference

Teams
- Chicago White Sox (2002–2004); Seattle Mariners (2004–2005); San Diego Padres (2005); Florida Marlins (2006–2007); Kansas City Royals (2008–2009); Colorado Rockies (2010); Seattle Mariners (2011–2012); Miami Marlins (2013); Los Angeles Dodgers (2014)

Miguel Eduardo Olivo Peña (born July 15, 1978) is a Dominican former professional baseball player. He played as a catcher for several teams in Major League Baseball (MLB) from 2002 to 2014. He also played in the Mexican League from 2014 to 2017.

== Professional career ==
=== Oakland Athletics ===
Olivo was signed as an undrafted free agent by the Oakland Athletics in 1996 and played in the A's minor-league system through 2000.

=== Chicago White Sox ===
On December 13, 2000, he was traded to the Chicago White Sox as the player to be named later in an early trade for Chad Bradford. In July 2001, while playing for White Sox Class AA affiliate in Birmingham, Olivo was suspended for six games and barred from that year's All-Star Futures Game for using a corked bat. Olivo maintained the bat, which had an A's logo on it, had been given to him by a former teammate while playing in the Athletics system.

He made his major league debut on September 15, 2002, with the White Sox and hit a home run in his first Major League at-bat, off Andy Pettitte of the New York Yankees. He played 6 games that year, with 4 hits in 19 at-bats. He was the backup catcher for the White Sox for all of 2003 and the first half of 2004. In 166 games with the White Sox, he hit .245 with 14 homers and 58 RBI.

=== Seattle Mariners ===
Olivo was traded from the Sox to the Seattle Mariners on June 27, 2004, along with Jeremy Reed in exchange for Freddy García and Ben Davis.

=== San Diego Padres ===
After struggling with the Mariners he was traded to the San Diego Padres on July 31, 2005, for minor leaguer Daniel Mateo and Miguel Ojeda. He played in 37 games for the Padres and hit .304. Olivo is remembered by Padres broadcaster Mark Grant for an interview in which he started talking about newly acquired pitcher Chan Ho Park, when instead he was asked about the Padres stadium, Petco Park

=== Florida Marlins ===
He signed as a free agent with the Florida Marlins on January 3, 2006. He spent the next two seasons with the Marlins, hitting .263 in 127 games in 2006 and .237 in 122 games in 2007. In 2007, he had the lowest fielding percentage of all NL catchers (.986.)

On September 29, 2007, the second to last game of the season in a game against the New York Mets, Olivo charged across the diamond and attempted to throw a punch at Jose Reyes (instead hitting Sandy Alomar Sr. who blocked the punch) starting a bench-clearing brawl between the teams. He was ejected from the game for starting the brawl and Reyes stayed in the game.

Olivo was not offered a new contract by the Marlins and became a free agent on December 12, 2007.

=== Kansas City Royals ===
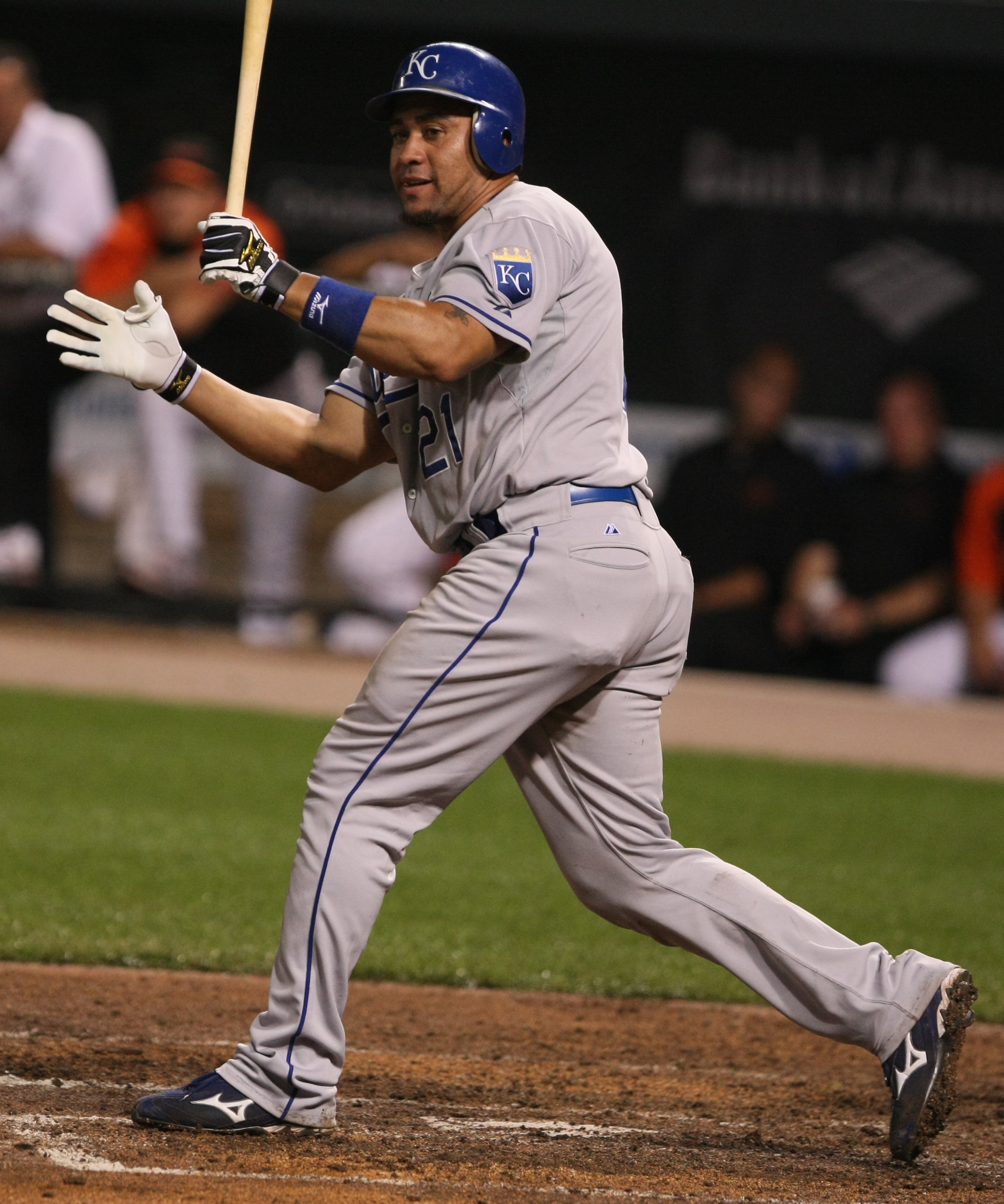
Olivo with the Royals in 2009

On December 27, 2007, Olivo signed a one-year contract with the Kansas City Royals. On August 3, 2008, during a game against the White Sox, he was hit by a pitch thrown by D. J. Carrasco. Olivo charged after Carrasco and started another bench-clearing brawl. On November 6, 2009, the Royals declined his option, making him a free agent. In 198 games over two seasons, he hit .251 with 35 homers and 106 RBI.

=== Colorado Rockies ===
On January 4, 2010, Olivo signed a one-year deal with the Colorado Rockies.

Olivo made headlines in early 2010 for having to leave the Rockies' April 29 game against the Arizona Diamondbacks at the beginning of the eighth inning to pass a kidney stone. Remarkably, he was able to re-enter soon after and finished the game. On October 1, Olivo was hit in the back of the head by the bat of Albert Pujols. He suffered a mild concussion, but returned to the team later in the game. In 112 games with the Rockies, he hit .269 with 14 homers and 58 RBI.

=== Second stint with the Mariners ===
On November 4, 2010, Olivo was traded to the Toronto Blue Jays as part of a conditional deal. The Blue Jays declined to exercise his contract option for 2011 but offered him arbitration; he declined, becoming a free agent.

Olivo signed a 2-year, $7 million contract with the Seattle Mariners on December 9, 2010.

Olivo hit his second grand slam of his career on July 21, 2011, against the Blue Jays in Rogers Centre. In 2011, Olivo had the worst walk-to-strikeouts ratio in the major leagues, with 0.14 walks for every strikeout.

On October 24, 2012, the Mariners announced that they would not pick up Olivo's $3 million club option for 2013. Olivo was paid a $750,000 buyout.

=== Cincinnati Reds ===
On February 1, 2013, the Cincinnati Reds signed Olivo to a minor-league deal with an invitation to Spring training. On March 27, 2013, he asked for, and was granted, his release from the Reds.

=== Second stint with the Marlins ===
On March 27, 2013, Olivo signed a one-year deal with the Miami Marlins, just one day after requesting his release from the Reds.

On June 14, 2013, in frustration over a lack of playing time, Olivo 'walked out' on the Marlins at the start of their game that evening, demanding that the team release him. Olivo watched the team play the first inning of the game from the clubhouse, then changed into street clothes and left the ballpark. In response, the Marlins declined the request and instead placed him on the 'restricted list', during which time he was not paid (his one-year contract was worth $800,000) and he could not seek employment with another team.

=== Los Angeles Dodgers ===
On January 21, 2014, he signed a minor league contract with the Los Angeles Dodgers and was assigned to the Triple-A Albuquerque Isotopes. He was purchased by the Dodgers and added to the 25 man active roster on April 30, 2014. In 8 games with the Dodgers, he hit only .217 before he was optioned back to Triple-A on May 14.

On May 20, 2014, Olivo was involved in an altercation with Isotopes teammate Alex Guerrero. During the incident, Olivo bit off a piece of Guerrero's ear, an injury which required cosmetic surgery to repair. Two days later the Dodgers gave him his unconditional release. He had been hitting .368 in Triple-A at the time of his release, with 4 home runs and 20 RBI in 20 games.

=== Toros de Tijuana ===
On June 26, 2014, Olivo signed with the Toros de Tijuana of the Mexican League. In 35 games he hit .309/.356/.585 with 8 home runs, 21 RBIs and 1 stolen base.

In 2015, Olivo re-signed with Tijuana for a second season. He became a free agent following the season. In 89 games he hit .281/.347/.472 with 14 home runs, 56 RBIs and 13 stolen bases.

=== San Francisco Giants ===
On January 29, 2016, Olivo signed a minor league contract with the San Francisco Giants. In 81 games for the Triple–A Sacramento River Cats, he batted .246/.289/.419 with 10 home runs and 34 RBI. Olivo elected free agency following the season on November 7.

=== Bravos de León ===
On March 30, 2017, Olivo signed with the Bravos de León of the Mexican League. He was released on April 23. In 20 games he struggled immensely hitting .159/.181/.246 with 1 home run, 6 RBIs and 1 stolen base.

== See also ==
- List of Major League Baseball players with a home run in their first major league at bat
