= Yasuhiko Yabuta =

Japanese baseball player

Yasuhiko Yabuta 薮田 安彦
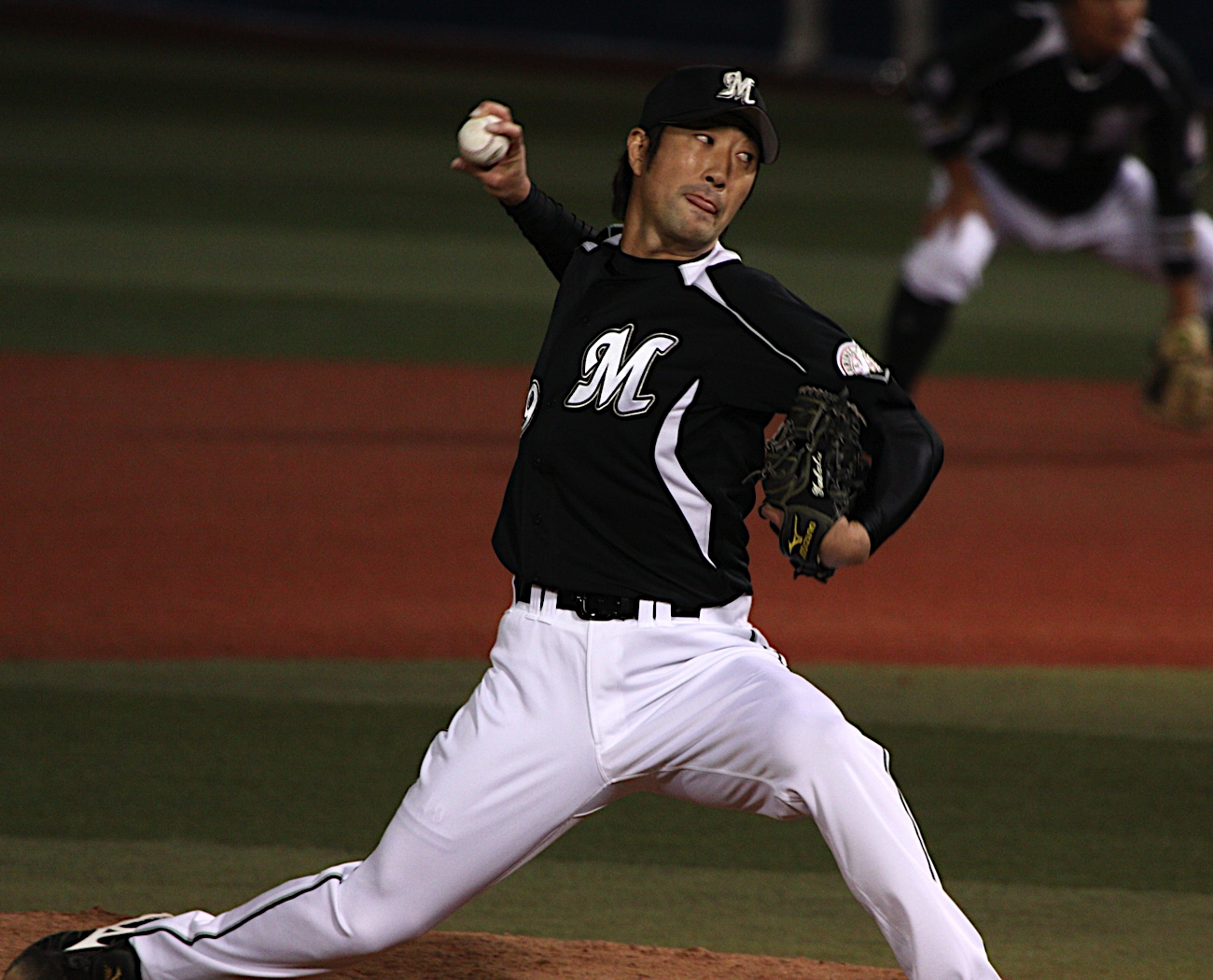
- Pitcher
- Born: June 19, 1973 (age 52); Kishiwada, Osaka, Japan
- Batted: Right Threw: Right

Professional debut
- NPB: May 31, 1996, for the Chiba Lotte Marines
- MLB: April 5, 2008, for the Kansas City Royals

Last appearance
- MLB: October 4, 2009, for the Kansas City Royals
- NPB: October 6, 2012, for the Chiba Lotte Marines

NPB statistics
- Win–loss record: 48–72
- Earned run average: 3.81
- Strikeouts: 710
- Holds: 112
- Saves: 67

MLB statistics
- Win–loss record: 3–4
- Earned run average: 7.14
- Strikeouts: 34
- Stats at Baseball Reference

Teams
- Chiba Lotte Marines (1996–2007); Kansas City Royals (2008–2009); Chiba Lotte Marines (2010–2013)

Career highlights and awards
- 2× Japan Series champion (2005, 2010); 2× NPB All-Star (2005, 2007)
Medals
Representing Japan
Men's baseball
World Baseball Classic
Gold medal – first place	2006 San Diego	Team

Yasuhiko Yabuta (薮田 安彦, Yabuta Yasuhiko; born June 19, 1973) is a Japanese former baseball pitcher.

Yabuta made his professional debut with the Marines in 1996, and spent 12 years with the organization. He competed in the 2006 World Baseball Classic and struck out Alex Rodriguez, Johnny Damon, and Derrek Lee. He served as a setup man for the Marines in 2007 recording a 4–6 record with a 2.73 ERA in 58 games. After the season, he declared his free agency and came to America to pursue a Major League Baseball career. On November 22, 2007, the Kansas City Star reported that the Kansas City Royals agreed with Yabuta on a two-year contract with a club option for 2010.

Yabuta officially signed with the Royals on November 28, 2007. He signed a two-year, $6 million deal with the Kansas City Royals. The deal included a $4 million club option for a third year. Yabuta was sent down to Triple-A Omaha Royals on June 25, 2008. He was designated for assignment on August 2 and was eventually sent outright to the minors. He was brought back to the Royals when the rosters expanded on September 1.

His teammates on the Royals have given him the nickname "Shake."

On November 24, 2009, he signed a one-year deal with his old team Chiba Lotte, and he has remained with the team since.
