= Miguel Peña =

Miguel Peña may refer to:

- Miguel Peña (politician) (1781–1833), Venezuelan politician
- Miguel Peña (runner) (1897–?), Spanish distance runner

== See also ==
- Miguel Peña Parish, area in Venezuela
