= La Banda Gorda =

Dominican Republic Merengue music group

- Origin: Dominican Republic
- Genres: Merengue
- Years active: 1994–present
- Members: Jose Peña Suazo

La Banda Gorda is a popular Merengue music group from Dominican Republic directed by José Peña Suazo. The band plays fast Merengue from Dominican Republic, salsa music and is known for its diverse style and Caribbean flavor.

== History ==
Jose Peña Suazo had previously worked with Latin music makers including Alfonso "Pochi" Vásquez and Kinito Mendez. In 1994 Suazo went on his own and formed his own group which he named "Jose Peña Suazo y la Banda Gorda", dubbed 'Banda Gorda' for short. The group's first album "Libre al fin" (Free at Last), was released on April 19, 1994. The group has made albums regularly, though not yearly, ever since.

== Discography ==
- Libre al Fin (1994)
- Candela Pura (1995)
- Tu Muere Aquí (1996)
- Por el Mismo Camino... Durísimo (1997)
- Calienta Esto (1998)
- Evolución (1999)
- Aquí, Pero Allá... (1999)
- 20th Anniversary (1999)
- Esta Noche (2000)
- Melao' (2002)
- 10th Anniversary (2002)
- Sueña (2004)
- Puro Mambo (2004)
- Más Durísimo (2005)
- The Number One (2008)
- Ironía (2008)
- Esto Se Baila Así (2011)
