= José Peña Suazo =

Dominican singer (born 1967)

- Born: José Virgilio Peña Suazo; January 18, 1967 (age 59); Cotuí, Sánchez Ramírez Province, Dominican Republic
- Genre: Merengue
- Occupation: Singer
- Years active: 1994–present

José Peña Suazo (born January 18, 1967) is a Dominican Merengue singer, arranger, composer and musician. Peña Suazo has played the trumpet, composed and arranged in many Dominican merengue music groups like Cuco Valoy's orchestra and La Artillería. He is currently the lead singer of La Banda Gorda.

== Career ==
=== Early life ===
José Peña Suazo was born on January 18, 1967, in Cotuí, capital of Sánchez Ramírez Province in the Cibao, Dominican Republic.

He was a premature baby but was able to survive his early childhood. While growing up in Dominican Republic he was exposed to many Latin music genres like Bachata, Merengue and Salsa. At the age of seventeen Peña Suazo started taking Tuba lessons with the Dominican music teacher Juan Eutimo Jerez. However, after his older brother, Arturo Suazo, formed his own group, Suazo joined him as a trumpet player.

=== 1980s ===
In 1987, Suazo moved out of Cotuí to the Dominican Republic's capital Santo Domingo, looking for a band in which he could advance his music career. For some time, he played in the Santo Domingo Fire Department's music band and then joined Cuco Valoy's orchestra, where he was first trumpet and composed and arranged some of the group songs. He was then approached and asked to be the musical director of the renowned Dominican merengue band called La Artillería.

=== 1990s ===
In 1991, he played the trumpet in the Pochy y la Coco Band group and composed and arranged songs for them as well.

== La Banda Gorda ==
In 1994, Suazo formed the International Merengue music band La Banda Gorda, in which he is the lead singer, arranger and composer.

== Discography ==
- Libre al Fin (1994)
- Candela Pura (1995)
- Tu Muere Aquí (1996)
- Por el Mismo Camino... Durísimo (1997)
- Calienta Esto (1998)
- Evolución (1999)
- Aquí, Pero Allá... (1999)
- 20th Anniversary (1999)
- Esta Noche (2000)
- Melao' (2002)
- 10th Anniversary (2002)
- Sueña (2004)
- Puro Mambo (2004)
- Más Durísimo (2005)
- The Number One (2008)
- Ironía (2008)
- Esto Se Baila Así (2011)
