= Tony Peña Jr. =

Dominican baseball player (born 1981)

- Pitcher / Shortstop
- Born: March 23, 1981 (age 44); Santiago, Dominican Republic
- Batted: Right Threw: Right

MLB debut
- April 13, 2006, for the Atlanta Braves

Last appearance
- July 12, 2009, for the Kansas City Royals

MLB statistics
- Batting average: .228
- Home runs: 4
- Runs batted in: 66
- Win–loss record: 0–0
- Earned run average: 0.00
- Strikeouts: 1
- Stats at Baseball Reference

Teams
- As player: Atlanta Braves (2006); Kansas City Royals (2007–2009); As coach: Kansas City Royals (2021)
Medals
Men's baseball
Representing Dominican Republic
Central American and Caribbean Games
Bronze medal – third place	2002 San Salvador	Team
Intercontinental Cup
Bronze medal – third place	2002 Havana	Team

Tony Francisco Peña (born March 23, 1981) is a Dominican former professional baseball pitcher. Peña played shortstop until the 2009 season, when he converted to pitching. He played in Major League Baseball (MLB) for the Atlanta Braves and Kansas City Royals.

When he retired from playing, Peña moved on to coaching. He is currently the manager for the Kansas City Royals' Single-A affiliate, the Columbia Fireflies.

== Family ==
Peña is the son of Tony Peña and the brother of Francisco Peña. His uncle, Ramón Peña, pitched for the Detroit Tigers in 1989.

== Playing career ==
=== Atlanta Braves ===
A non-drafted free agent, Peña was signed on July 21, 1999 by the Atlanta Braves. He made his big league debut with Atlanta on April 13, 2006. His first Major League hit came on April 21 at Washington against the Nationals. He appeared in 40 games for the Braves, batting .227 with a home run and three RBIs in 44 at-bats.

=== Kansas City Royals ===
On March 23, 2007, Peña was traded to Kansas City for pitching prospect Erik Cordier. In Peña's first game as a Royal, he hit two triples. Peña finished 2007, his first full season, at .267/.284/.356 with two homers and 47 RBIs. He also hit seven triples and stole five bases.

Pena lost his job as a regular starter in the middle of 2008. From June through the end of 2008, Pena mainly entered games as a defensive replacement. Pena made his major league pitching debut on July 21, performing mop-up duty in a 19–4 blowout loss to the Detroit Tigers. He pitched a 1-2-3 inning with a strikeout of Iván Rodríguez. Pena made 75 plate appearances in 46 games through the last four months of the 2008 season and was designated for assignment by the Kansas City Royals on July 16, 2009.

=== San Francisco Giants ===
On December 11, 2009, Peña, signed a minor league contract with the San Francisco Giants to try to be a pitcher and was placed with the Richmond Flying Squirrels, the Giants' Double-A affiliate.

=== Boston Red Sox ===
On January 5, 2011, Peña signed a minor league contract with the Boston Red Sox.

=== Vaqueros Laguna ===
Pena was released by the Vaqueros Laguna on June 16, 2016.

=== Saraperos de Saltillo ===
On June 19, 2016, Peña signed with the Saraperos de Saltillo of the Mexican League.

=== Olmecas de Tabasco ===
On May 19, 2017, Peña was released by the Olmecas de Tabasco of the Mexican League. He ultimately would not appear in another professional baseball game.

=== Kansas City Royals (second stint) ===
On May 30, 2017, Peña signed a minor league deal with the Kansas City Royals.

== Coaching career ==
Peña managed the Arizona League Royals during the 2019 season.

He was named the bench coach of the Omaha Storm Chasers prior to the 2020 season which ultimately was not played due to the COVID-19 pandemic. In January 2021, it was announced that he would join the Royals' big league coaching staff.

On January 14, 2022, Peña was announced as the manager of the Columbia Fireflies. On January 16, 2026, Peña was announced as an infield coordinator within Kansas City's player development department.

== See also ==
- List of second-generation Major League Baseball players
