= Ron Mahay =

American baseball player (born 1971)

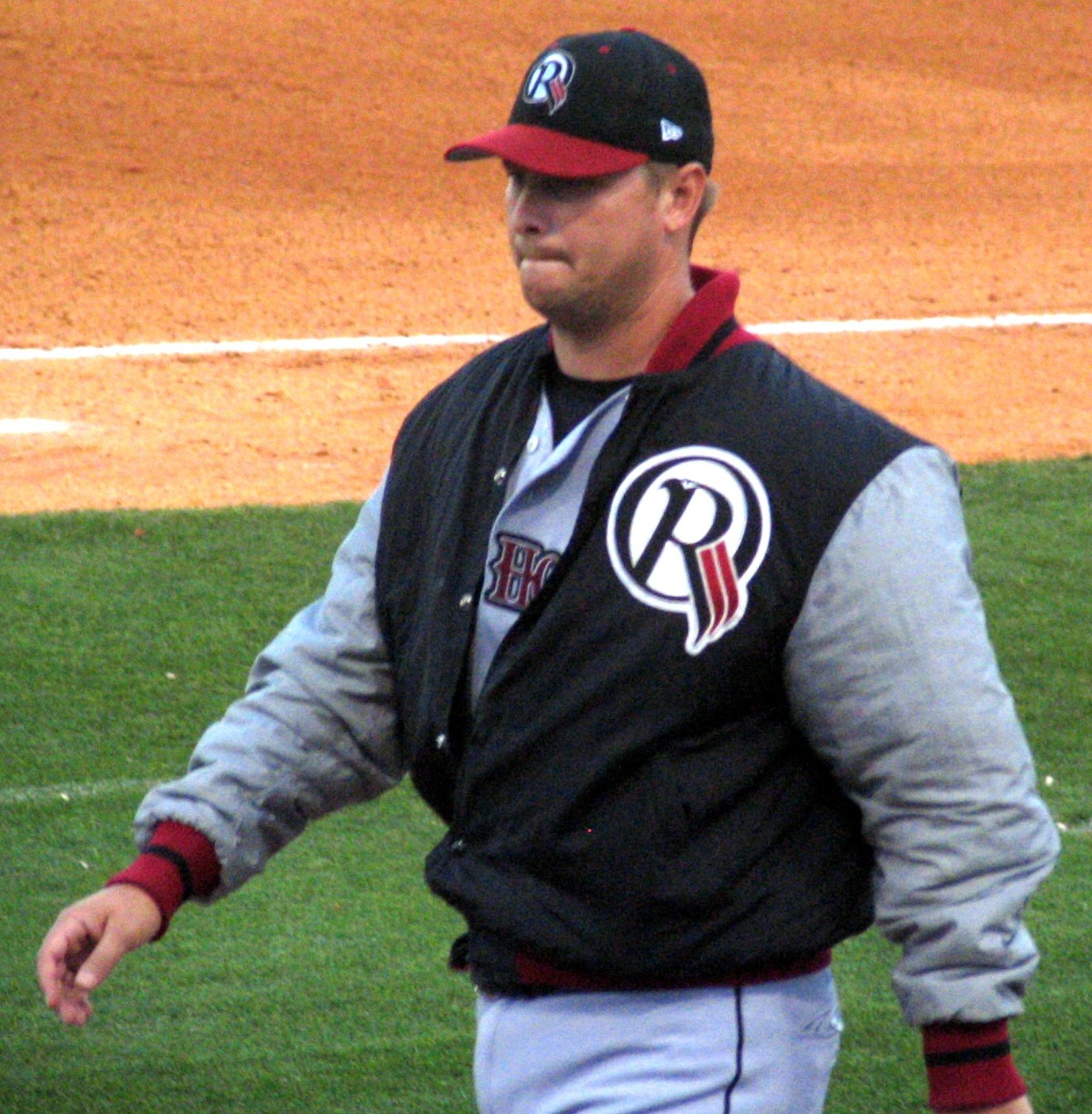
- Mahay with the Oklahoma RedHawks in 2006
- Pitcher
- Born: June 28, 1971 (age 55); Crestwood, Illinois, U.S.
- Batted: Left Threw: Left

MLB debut
- May 21, 1995, for the Boston Red Sox

Last MLB appearance
- August 21, 2010, for the Minnesota Twins

MLB statistics
- Win–loss record: 27–12
- Earned run average: 3.83
- Strikeouts: 470
- Stats at Baseball Reference

Teams
- Boston Red Sox (1995, 1997–1998); Oakland Athletics (1999–2000); Florida Marlins (2000); Chicago Cubs (2001–2002); Texas Rangers (2003–2007); Atlanta Braves (2007); Kansas City Royals (2008–2009); Minnesota Twins (2009–2010)

Ronald Matthew Mahay (/məˈheɪ/; born June 28, 1971) is an American former professional baseball pitcher. He played for the Boston Red Sox, Oakland Athletics, Florida Marlins, Chicago Cubs, Texas Rangers, Atlanta Braves, Kansas City Royals, and Minnesota Twins. After retiring from active play in January 2013, he was named a scout by the Los Angeles Dodgers for the 2014 season. He is currently the pitching coach for the Mahoning Valley Scrappers of the MLB Draft League.

== Professional career ==
=== Boston Red Sox ===
Mahay was drafted as an outfielder in the 18th round (486th overall) of the 1991 Major League Baseball draft by the Boston Red Sox out of South Suburban College, a junior college in South Holland, Illinois, where he both pitched and played center field. When the 1994–95 Major League Baseball strike lasted into spring training the following year, Mahay was one of the replacement players called up by the Red Sox. As a consequence, Mahay (and all other 1995 replacement players who later made the big leagues) is not eligible for membership in the Major League Baseball Players Association.

Mahay made his Major League debut with the Red Sox on May 21, 1995, as an outfielder, and appeared in five games, batting .200 with four hits in 20 at-bats, including two doubles and a home run. He was returned to the minors after a month. In 1996, Mahay moved from the outfield to the pitching mound where he spent the off-season with the Gold Coast Cougars in the Australian Baseball League perfecting his adaptation to pitcher.

On July 15, 1997, Mahay was called up by Boston. He made his first pitching appearance on July 17 against the Baltimore Orioles. In his one inning of work, he struck out Roberto Alomar and allowed a home run to Rafael Palmeiro, ultimately earning the win in Boston's 12–9 victory. Mahay finished the season with a 3–0 record and a 2.52 ERA in 28 appearances.

In 1998, Mahay went 1–1 with one save and a 3.46 ERA in 29 appearances. He struck out 14 batters while walking 15 in 26 innings pitched.

=== Oakland Athletics ===
On March 30, 1999, the Oakland Athletics claimed Mahay off waivers. He spent most of the 1999 season with the Triple-A Vancouver Canadians, going 7–2 with a 4.29 ERA in 32 games (15 starts). On September 2, Mahay was recalled as part of Oakland's September call-ups. He appeared in six games (one start) for the A's in 1999, going 2–0 with one save and a 1.86 ERA.

Mahay struggled to begin 2000, going 0–1 with a 9.00 ERA in five games (two starts). He was designated for assignment on May 8.

=== Florida Marlins ===
On May 11, 2000, Mahay's contract was purchased by the Florida Marlins. While pitching for the Marlins, Mahay recorded his last two Major League hits, a single and a double, in four at-bats. He appeared in 18 games with the Marlins, and posted a 1–0 record and a 6.04 ERA.

=== San Diego Padres ===
Mahay signed with the San Diego Padres as a free agent on November 20, 2000. He was released on May 15, 2001. At the time, he had posted a 1–2 record and a 3.78 ERA in 14 games with the Triple-A Portland Beavers.

=== Chicago Cubs ===
Mahay signed with the Chicago Cubs on May 19, 2001. He split his time over the next two seasons with the Cubs and their Triple-A Iowa Cubs. At the major league level in 2001, Mahay posted a 2.61 ERA in 17 relief appearances. In 2002, he was 2–0 with an ERA of 8.59 in 11 appearances with the Cubs.

=== Texas Rangers ===
On December 13, 2002, Mahay signed with the Texas Rangers. He started the 2003 season with the Triple-A Oklahoma RedHawks. On June 27, he was called up to Texas, and remained with the big league club almost exclusively until his tenure with the Rangers ended. Mahay went 3–3 with a 3.18 ERA in 35 relief appearances in 2003.

2004 was a career year for Mahay, as he notched a career-highs in appearances (60), ERA (2.55) and strikeouts (54). He was one of the mainstays of the Rangers' bullpen from 2003-2007, especially in the 2005 and 2006 seasons, as Mahay (along with C. J. Wilson) was one of only two regular left-handed relievers on the Rangers' roster.

=== Atlanta Braves ===
On July 30, 2007, Mahay was traded along with Mark Teixeira to the Atlanta Braves for Elvis Andrus, Beau Jones, Neftalí Feliz, Matt Harrison and Jarrod Saltalamacchia. In his Braves debut on August 1, Mahay tossed a scoreless eighth inning in a 12–3 rout of the Houston Astros. He earned his first win as a Brave on August 11, 2007, against the Philadelphia Phillies. He finished the season 3–0 with one save and a combined 2.55 ERA in 58 games with Texas and Atlanta. Mahay elected free agency on October 29. On December 7, he declined the Braves' arbitration offer.

=== Kansas City Royals ===
On December 20, 2007, Mahay reached an agreement on a two-year, $8 million contract with the Kansas City Royals. For the 2008 season, he was 5–0 with a 3.48 ERA in 57 relief appearances. Mahay struggled during the 2009 season, going 1–1 with a 4.79 ERA in 41 relief appearances. He was released by the Royals on August 24.

=== Minnesota Twins ===
On August 29, 2009, Mahay signed with the Minnesota Twins. He went 1–0 with a 2.00 ERA in 16 relief appearances with Minnesota. Mahay also saw his first postseason action, recording a 5.40 ERA in the New York Yankees' three-game series sweep of the Twins. At the end of the 2009 season, Mahay became a free agent.

On March 24, 2010, Mahay signed a minor league contract to rejoin the Twins. He returned to the majors on April 13, 2010. In 41 relief appearances, Mahay went 1–1 with an ERA of 3.44.

=== Los Angeles Dodgers ===
On February 3, 2011, Mahay signed a minor league contract with the Los Angeles Dodgers, that included an invite to spring training. He was unable to win a spot on the Dodgers major league roster and was released on March 26.

=== Arizona Diamondbacks ===
Mahay signed a minor league contract with the Arizona Diamondbacks on April 8, 2011, but was released on May 13.

=== St. Louis Cardinals ===
He signed a minor league contract with the St. Louis Cardinals on July 5, 2011, and was assigned to the Triple-A Memphis Redbirds. He elected to become a free agent on August 12. He made 12 appearances for Memphis, recording a 1.64 ERA and a 1.000 WHIP.

=== Cincinnati Reds ===
On January 13, 2012, Mahay signed a minor league contract with the Reds, but was released on May 11 after posting a 4.50 ERA in only 18 innings of work.

On January 27, 2013, Mahay officially announced his retirement from baseball. At the time of his retirement, Mahay was the last active replacement player from the 1995 spring training.

== Personal ==
Mahay and his wife, the former Alison Palmieri, were married on November 7, 1998. They have two daughters, Madison Parker and Mackenzie Reece, and a son, Mason Patrick. Mahay now lives in Burbank, California, where he has been an assistant varsity baseball coach at John Burroughs High School.
