= Sam Narron =

Sam Narron may refer to:

- Sam Narron (catcher) (1913–1996), Major League Baseball catcher and coach
- Sam Narron (pitcher) (born 1981), Major League Baseball pitcher
