= Jerry Narron =

American baseball player, coach and manager (born 1956)

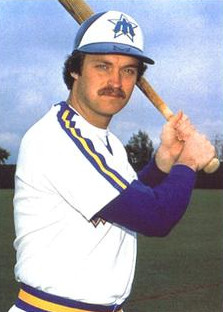
- Narron with the Seattle Mariners in 1981
- Catcher / Manager / Coach
- Born: January 15, 1956 (age 70); Goldsboro, North Carolina, U.S.
- Batted: Left Threw: Right

MLB debut
- April 13, 1979, for the New York Yankees

Last MLB appearance
- October 2, 1987, for the Seattle Mariners

MLB statistics
- Batting average: .211
- Home runs: 21
- Runs batted in: 96
- Managerial record: 291–341
- Winning %: .460
- Stats at Baseball Reference
- Managerial record at Baseball Reference

Teams
- As player: New York Yankees (1979); Seattle Mariners (1980–1981); California Angels (1983–1986); Seattle Mariners (1987); As manager: Texas Rangers (2001–2002); Cincinnati Reds (2005–2007); As coach: Baltimore Orioles (1993–1994); Texas Rangers (1995–2001); Boston Red Sox (2003); Cincinnati Reds (2004–2005); Milwaukee Brewers (2011–2015); Arizona Diamondbacks (2017–2019); Boston Red Sox (2020); Chicago White Sox (2021–2022); Los Angeles Angels (2024–2025)

Jerry Austin Narron (born January 15, 1956) is an American professional baseball manager, coach, and former player. He played in Major League Baseball (MLB), primarily as a catcher, for three teams during 1979–87. He has served as manager for the Texas Rangers (2001–02) and the Cincinnati Reds (2005–07).

He was the third base coach for Israel at the 2017 World Baseball Classic. Narron was also a coach for Team Israel, under manager Ian Kinsler, when it competed in the 2023 World Baseball Classic.

== Early years ==
Narron was born in Goldsboro, North Carolina. He is a Christian Zionist. His father John was employed as a salesman and floor layer for the Isaacs-Kahn Furniture Company in Goldsboro. He is a nephew of former major league catcher and longtime coach Sam Narron.

Through his childhood he played baseball at the Wayne County Boys Club. He attended Goldsboro High School, where he played baseball, basketball, and football, and graduated in 1974. He went to college at East Carolina University.

== Playing career ==
He was drafted out of high school when he was 18 years old by the New York Yankees in the sixth round of the 1974 Major League Baseball draft. He played alongside brother Johnny for the Johnson City Cardinals in the Rookie Appalachian League during his first professional season in 1974, batting .301/.415/.487 with 15 doubles (3rd in the league), 7 home runs (10th), and 49 RBIs (6th). In 1977, playing for the West Haven Yankees of the AA Eastern League, he batted .299 (eighth in the league)/.376/.527(third) with 80 runs (sixth), 28 home runs (second) and 93 RBIs (third) in 438 at bats.

He made his major league debut on April 13, 1979. Narron played for the Yankees as the backup catcher to Thurman Munson. He was the Yankees' starting catcher the day after Munson's death in a plane crash in August 1979, and remained in the dugout during the pregame ceremonies, leaving the catcher's position empty, out of respect for Munson.

In November 1979 Narron was traded by the Yankees to the Seattle Mariners with Juan Beniquez, Rick Anderson, and Jim Beattie for Jim Lewis and Ruppert Jones.

He was released by the Mariners in March 1982, and signed two days later as a free agent by the California Angels. Playing for the Spokane Indians in the AAA Pacific Coast League (PCL) in 1982, he batted .311/.381/.468 in 408 at bats. In 1983, playing for the Edmonton Trappers of the PCL, he batted .301/.377/.528 with 30 doubles (eighth in the league), 27 home runs (fourth) and 102 RBIs (fifth) in 539 at bats, while leading the league with 15 intentional walks. He was released by the Angels in April 1987, and signed later that month by the Seattle Mariners, who in turn released him the following November. He retired as a player in 1989.

== Managing and coaching history ==
=== Minor and major leagues ===
Narron was a manager in the Baltimore Orioles farm system from 1989 through 1992; of the Single–A Frederick Keys (1989), Double–A Hagerstown Suns (1990-91), and Triple–A Rochester Red Wings (1992), with a record of 291-269 (.520). He was then hired as a coach for the Orioles by skipper Johnny Oates.

After two seasons in Baltimore, he moved with Oates to the Texas Rangers. Narron was third-base coach for the Rangers from 1995 until he was named interim manager on May 4, 2001, after the firing of manager Johnny Oates. He had the interim tag removed and managed the team during the 2002 season. He was replaced in Texas by Buck Showalter in December 2002.

Narron then served as bench coach for the Boston Red Sox during their 2003 run to the American League Championship Series. He performed the same role for Cincinnati in 2004–05.

Narron was named the Reds' interim manager on June 20, 2005, following the firing of Dave Miley. On September 29 of that year, he was named permanent manager and was given a mutual option for 2007. Narron was fired as manager of the Reds on July 1, 2007. The Reds named advance scout Pete Mackanin as the interim manager. Narron's record with the Reds was 157–179.

On February 25, 2008, Narron was named a special assignments scout and front-office consultant with the Rangers.

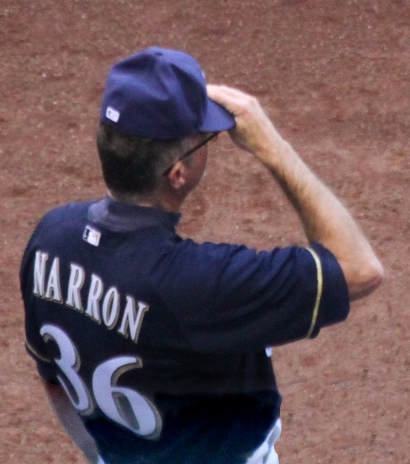
Narron in 2014

Narron served as bench coach for the Milwaukee Brewers from 2011 to 2015.

Narron was hired to be the 2017 manager of the Reno Aces on December 30, 2016.

After the first seven games of the 2017 season, Narron took over as interim bench coach of the major league Arizona Diamondbacks, when bench coach Ron Gardenhire left the team on a leave of absence to have and recover from prostate cancer surgery. Narron got the job permanently after Gardenhire was hired to be the Detroit Tigers' manager. Narron stepped down from his position as bench coach of the Diamondbacks following the 2019 season.

Narron was hired as bench coach for the Boston Red Sox on February 22, 2020. In October 2020, the team declined to renew his contract.

On February 10, 2021, Narron was hired as a major league instructor for the Chicago White Sox. On November 2, 2022, Narron and the White Sox parted ways.

In November 2023, Narron was hired as the catching coach for the Los Angeles Angels.

=== Team Israel; World Baseball Classic ===
Narron was the third base coach for Israel at the 2017 World Baseball Classic qualifier. Narron, whose daughter Callie lives in the Arnona neighborhood of Jerusalem, Israel, with her husband and two children, said: "I love the game, I love the Jewish people and I love Israel".

Narron was again a coach for Team Israel, under manager Ian Kinsler, when it competed in the 2023 World Baseball Classic.

=== Managerial records ===
Team	From	To	Regular season record				Post–season record			
Team	From	To	G	W	L	Win %	G	W	L	Win %
Texas Rangers	2001	2002	296	134	162	.453	—			
Cincinnati Reds	2005	2007	336	157	179	.467	—			
Total			632	291	341	.460	0	0	0	–

== Personal life ==
Narron is married to Donna Narron. He has five children and two stepchildren: Connor, Cara, Clare, Caitlyn, Callie, Chelsy, Coco and Hunter. His son Connor was the fourth-ranked prospect for the high school class of 2010 by ESPN's Perfect Game. The Orioles selected Connor in the fifth round of the 2010 MLB draft; he played in Minor League Baseball during the 2010 to 2014 seasons. Narron's brother Johnny was the hitting coach for the Milwaukee Brewers from 2012 to 2014. Narron is the nephew of former major league catcher and coach Sam W. Narron and cousin of pitcher Sam F. Narron.

Narron is known for writing out lineup cards using a distinct form of calligraphy, and for rendering the names of players from Japan, Korea and Taiwan in their native scripts on the lineup cards.

Sporting positions
Preceded by franchise created	Frederick Keys manager 1989	Succeeded by Wally Moon
Preceded by	Baltimore Orioles Bench Coach; 1993	Succeeded by Don Buford
Preceded by Mike Ferraro	Baltimore Orioles Third Base Coach; 1994	Succeeded by Steve Boros
Preceded by Mike Stanley; Ron Roenicke	Boston Red Sox Bench Coach; 2003; 2020	Succeeded by Brad Mills; Will Venable
Preceded by Ron Gardenhire	Arizona Diamondbacks Bench Coach; 2017 (interim)	Succeeded by Ron Gardenhire
