= Johnny Narron =

American baseball coach

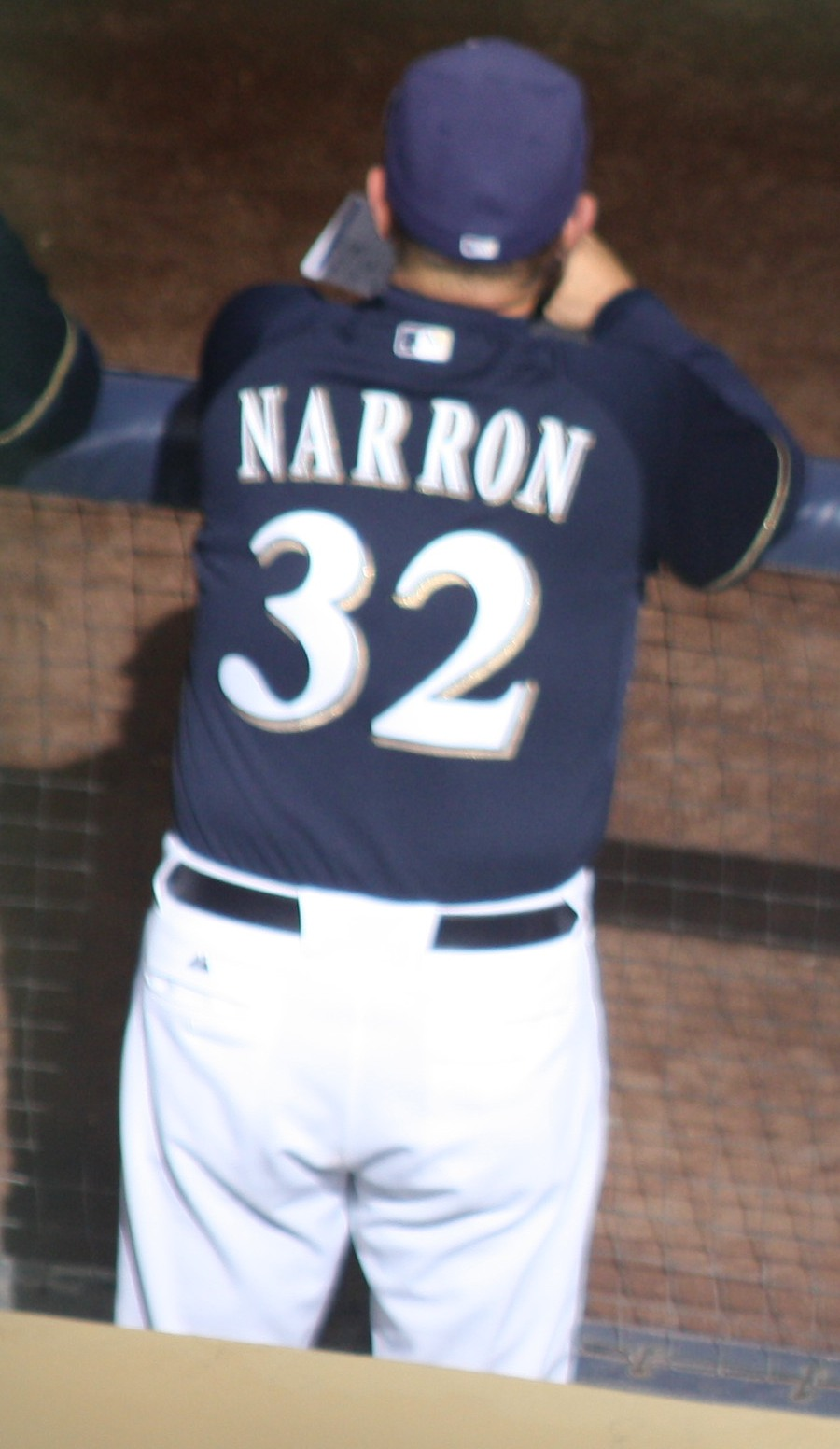
- Narron in the dugout
- Hitting coach
- Born: November 13, 1951 (age 74); Goldsboro, North Carolina, U.S.
- Bats: Left Throws: Right
- Stats at Baseball Reference

Teams
- As coach: Cincinnati Reds (2007); Texas Rangers (2008–2011); Milwaukee Brewers (2012–2014)

John A. Narron, Jr. (born November 13, 1951) is an American professional baseball coach. He is a former hitting coach of the Milwaukee Brewers and former assistant hitting coach of the Texas Rangers of Major League Baseball (MLB). He was a confidant and friend of center fielder Josh Hamilton and temporarily acted as an "accountability partner" to help Hamilton in his recovery from drug addiction.

The native of Goldsboro, North Carolina was a first baseman in the minor league systems of the New York Yankees and Chicago White Sox in 1974 and 1975.

He is the brother of former Rangers and Reds manager Jerry Narron, who served as the bench coach for the Brewers from 2011 to 2015. His late uncle Sam Narron was a catcher for the St. Louis Cardinals and a longtime coach with the Pittsburgh Pirates.

== Minor League Experience ==
Narron played for Johnston City, a Rookie affiliate of the New York Yankees during the year of 1974. He held a career best .272 batting average for Johnston City with 54 RBIs and 15 HRs. He then went on to play for the affiliate of the New York Yankees, Appleton. Here he posted an .228 batting average with 57 RBIs and 6 HRs.

== Coaching career ==
Narron spent 2007 with the Cincinnati Reds organization as the Reds' Major League Video/Administrative Coach. Narron spent four seasons as a coach in the farm system for the Brewers, including stints as hitting coach and manager at rookie-level Helena Brewers, in 2003, 2004 and 2006.

Narron was Josh Hamilton's off-field coach for five seasons. He served as an accountability partner for Hamilton, helping him stay free from his addiction to drugs and alcohol. At age 60, Narron was hoping for a more promising job and that came true in 2012 when Narron was offered the job to become the next Milwaukee Brewers hitting coach. Hamilton was supportive of Narron in his decision to move on with his career, saying "Johnny is very talented and has helped me tremendously, both personally and professionally. He is fulfilling a dream to be a Major League batting coach, and I have told him previously I would never stand in his way from doing that. We will stay in touch, and I wish him great success with the Brewers." Narron was not retained by the Brewers after the 2014 season and was hired soon thereafter by the Angels organization.

Preceded by Dale Sveum	Milwaukee Brewers Hitting Coach; 2012 – 2014	Succeeded by Darnell Coles
