= Jeff Baisley =

American baseball player (born 1982)

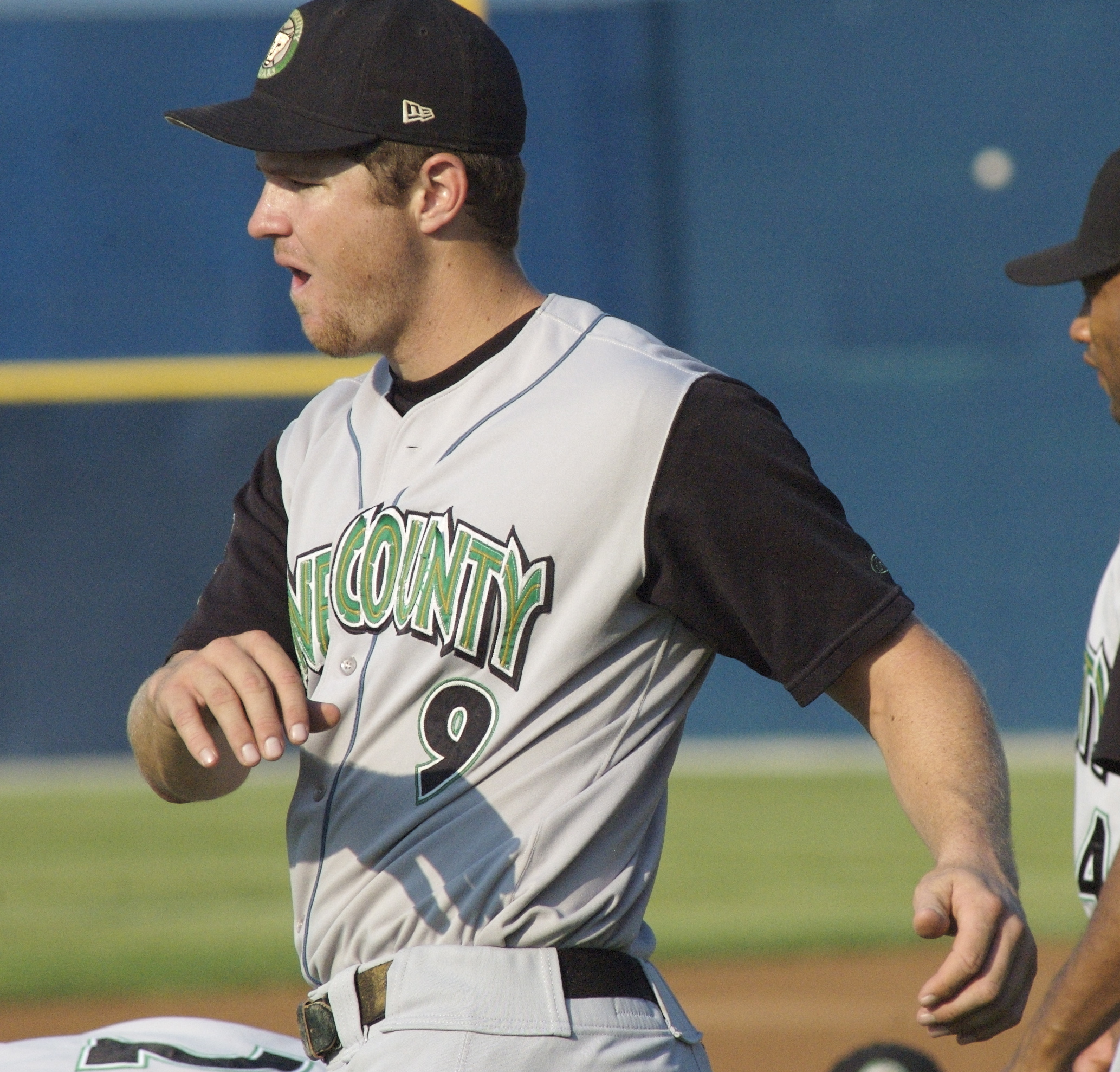
- Baisley with the Kane County Cougars in 2006
- Third baseman
- Born: December 19, 1982 (age 43); Tampa, Florida, United States
- Bats: Right Throws: Right

MLB debut
- September 9, 2008, for the Oakland Athletics

MLB statistics (through 2011 season)
- Batting average: .256
- Home runs: 0
- Runs batted in: 5
- Stats at Baseball Reference

Teams
- Oakland Athletics (2008)

Jeffrey Scot Baisley (born December 19, 1982) is an American former professional baseball third baseman who played in Major League Baseball (MLB) for the Oakland Athletics in 2008.

== College career ==
A native of Tampa, Florida, Baisley attended the University of South Florida, where he played college baseball for the Bulls. While there, he was named to the All-Tournament Team in the 2002 Conference USA baseball tournament, in which South Florida was a semi-finalist. In 2003, he played collegiate summer baseball with the Cotuit Kettleers of the Cape Cod Baseball League.

== Professional career ==
=== Oakland Athletics ===
Baisley was drafted by the Oakland Athletics in the 12th round of the 2005 Major League Baseball draft out of the University of South Florida. He made his professional debut that year with the Vancouver Canadians. In 2006, playing for the Kane County Cougars, Baisley was selected as the Midwest League Most Valuable Player as the stand-out contributor to the 2006 Cougars' offense. The 6'3" Baisley drove in 110 runs and hitting 22 homers. His most notable performance was a game when he hit three home runs, the last of which was postponed during an umpire discussion on the eligibility of a home run that hit the scoreboard. Baisley was ultimately awarded the homer. He played in 2007 for the Midland RockHounds and in 2008 for the Sacramento River Cats. He was called up to the major leagues on September 9, 2008, and made his debut that night against the Detroit Tigers going hitless in two at-bats with a walk. He collected his first base hit on September 18 against the Los Angeles Angels of Anaheim. He played in 14 games with the Athletics, hitting .256.

=== Los Angeles Angels of Anaheim ===
On March 10, 2011, that Baisley signed a minor league contract with the Angels and he played in 134 games with the Salt Lake Bees in 2011, hitting .303 with 20 home runs and 100 RBI.

=== Los Angeles Dodgers ===
Baisley signed a minor league contract with the Los Angeles Dodgers on December 14, 2011, that included an invitation to Major League camp. He was assigned to the Triple-A Albuquerque Isotopes, where he played in 62 games and hit .284. Baisley was released by the Dodgers on June 12, 2012.

=== Detroit Tigers ===
On June 19, 2012, Baisley signed a minor league contract with the Detroit Tigers, and was added to their Triple-A roster, the Toledo Mud Hens. After just 10 games, where he hit .081 (3 hits in 37 at bats), he was released.

=== Chicago White Sox ===
On July 3, 2012, Baisley agreed to terms with the White Sox and was added to their Triple-A roster, the Charlotte Knights. He was released in August.

=== Acereros del Norte ===
On April 20, 2013, Baisley signed with the Acereros del Norte of the Mexican League.
