= Darnell Coles =

American baseball player and coach (born 1962)

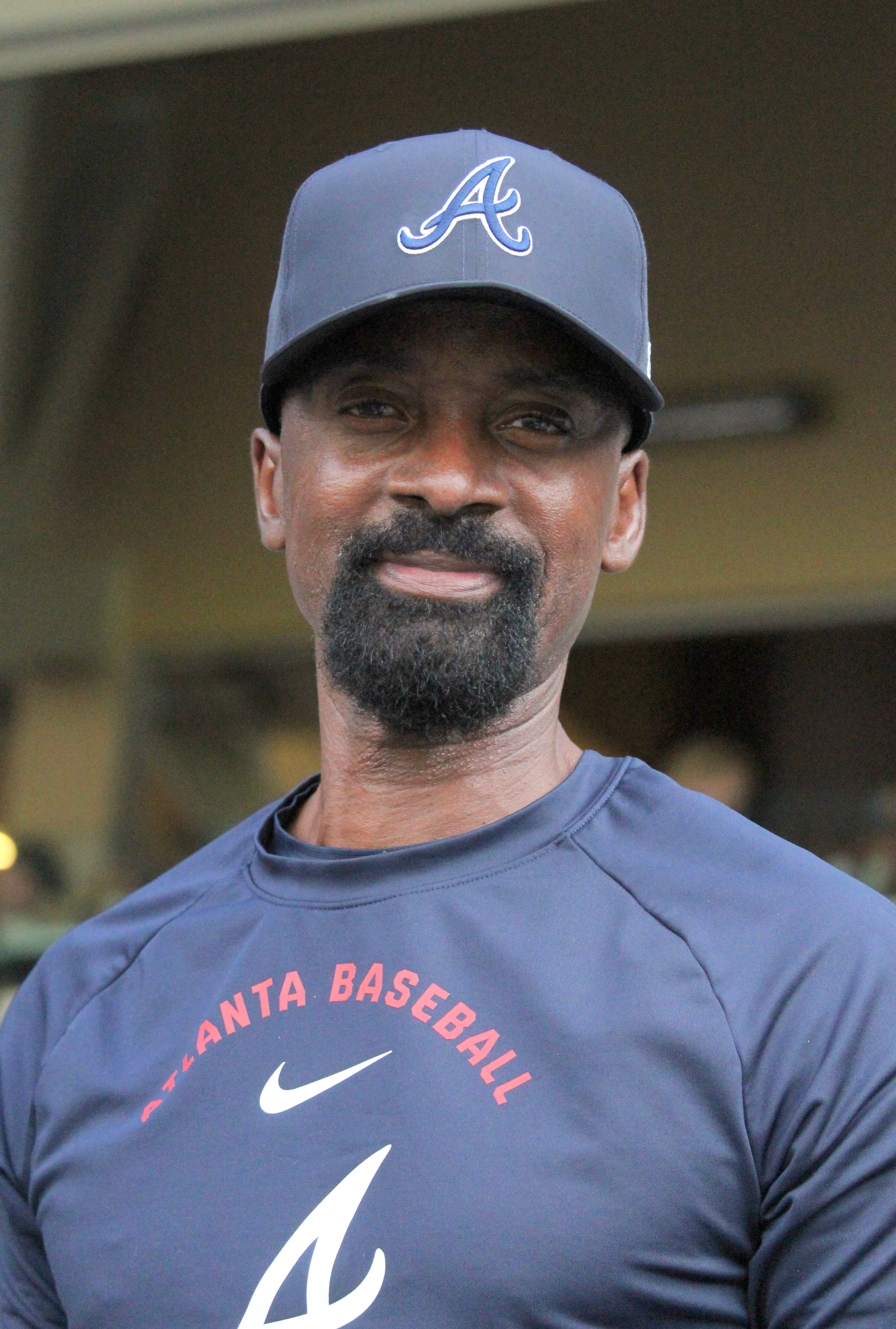
- Coles with the Atlanta Braves in 2026

Atlanta Braves – No. 88
- Third baseman / Outfielder
- Born: June 2, 1962 (age 64); San Bernardino, California, U.S.
- Batted: Right Threw: Right

Professional debut
- MLB: September 4, 1983, for the Seattle Mariners
- NPB: April 5, 1996, for the Chunichi Dragons

Last appearance
- MLB: May 22, 1997, for the Colorado Rockies
- NPB: September 10, 1997, for the Hanshin Tigers

MLB statistics
- Batting average: .245
- Home runs: 75
- Runs batted in: 368

NPB statistics
- Batting average: .284
- Home runs: 36
- Runs batted in: 107
- Stats at Baseball Reference

Teams
- As player: Seattle Mariners (1983–1985); Detroit Tigers (1986–1987); Pittsburgh Pirates (1987–1988); Seattle Mariners (1988–1990); Detroit Tigers (1990); San Francisco Giants (1991); Cincinnati Reds (1992); Toronto Blue Jays (1993–1994); St. Louis Cardinals (1995); Chunichi Dragons (1996); Colorado Rockies (1997); Hanshin Tigers (1997); As coach: Detroit Tigers (2014); Milwaukee Brewers (2015–2018); Arizona Diamondbacks (2019–2021); Washington Nationals (2022–2025); Atlanta Braves (2026–present)

Career highlights and awards
- World Series champion (1993)

Darnell Coles (born June 2, 1962) is an American professional baseball player and current assistant hitting coach for the Atlanta Braves of Major League Baseball (MLB). He played in MLB and Nippon Professional Baseball (NPB) primarily as a third baseman and outfielder from 1983 to 1997. He has coached in MLB since 2014.

== Amateur career ==
Coles played baseball as well as football, basketball, and track at Eisenhower High School. He was the baseball team's MVP three times.

== Playing career ==
On June 3, 1980, Coles was drafted by the Seattle Mariners in the first round (sixth pick) of the 1980 Major League Baseball draft. He turned down a joint baseball and football scholarship to UCLA to sign with the Mariners. He reached the majors in 1983, batting .214 in parts of three seasons before the Mariners traded him to the Detroit Tigers for Rich Monteleone.

In 1986, Coles hit a career-high 20 home runs for the Tigers. He had two three-home run games in his career: in 1987 with the Pittsburgh Pirates and in 1994 with the Toronto Blue Jays.

== Coaching career ==
In 2006, Coles was hired as the roving hitting instructor for the Washington Nationals organization. He was the manager of the Vermont Lake Monsters in 2007, and manager of the Class A Hagerstown Suns in 2008. In 2009 he was the hitting coach for the Triple-A Syracuse Chiefs.

On October 10, 2013, Coles was selected to manage the Milwaukee Brewers Triple-A affiliate, the Nashville Sounds, after previously managing the organization's Double-A Huntsville Stars from 2012 to 2013. However, on November 25, the Detroit Tigers announced the hiring of Coles as assistant hitting coach.

On October 23, 2014, the Milwaukee Brewers announced Coles replaced Johnny Narron as the hitting coach. He resigned after the 2018 season and became the hitting coach for the Arizona Diamondbacks. On June 10, 2021, Coles was relieved of his position with the club.

The Washington Nationals hired Coles to be their hitting coach following the 2021 season.

On November 11, 2025, Coles was hired by the Atlanta Braves to serve as an assistant hitting coach.

Sporting positions
Preceded by Jose Alguacil	Vermont Lake Monsters Manager; 2007	Succeeded by Ramon Aviles
Preceded by Tom Herr	Hagerstown Suns Manager; 2008	Succeeded by Matt LeCroy
Preceded by Al LeBoeuf	Syracuse Chiefs Hitting Coach; 2009	Succeeded by Jerry Browne
Preceded by Mike Guerrero	Huntsville Stars Manager; 2012 - 2013	Succeeded by Carlos Subero
Preceded by Toby Harrah	Detroit Tigers Assistant Hitting Coach; 2014	Succeeded by David Newhan
Preceded by Johnny Narron	Milwaukee Brewers Hitting Coach; 2015 – 2018	Succeeded by Andy Haines
Preceded by Dave Magadan	Arizona Diamondbacks hitting coach 2019–2021	Succeeded by Rick Short
Preceded by Kevin Long	Washington Nationals hitting coach 2022-present	Succeeded by Incumbent
