= Wilkel Hernandez =

Venezuelan baseball player (born 1999)

Free agent
- Pitcher
- Born: April 13, 1999 (age 27); La Carlota, Venezuela
- Bats: Right Throws: Right

KBO debut
- March 28, 2026, for the Hanwha Eagles

KBO statistics (through July 18, 2026)
- Win–loss record: 3–6
- Earned run average: 4.92
- Strikeouts: 47

Teams
- Hanwha Eagles (2026)

Wilkel Fernando Hernandez (born April 13, 1999) is a Venezuelan professional baseball pitcher who is a free agent. He pitched in Minor League Baseball from 2016 to 2025 in the Los Angeles Angels and Detroit Tigers organizations. He originally signed with the Angels before being trade to the Tigers in a package deal for Ian Kinsler. He has previously played in the KBO League for the Hanwha Eagles.

== Career ==
=== Los Angeles Angels ===
On July 2, 2015, Hernandez signed with the Los Angeles Angels as an international free agent for $125,000. He made his professional debut in 2016 with the Dominican Summer League Angels.

Hernandez split the 2017 season between the rookie-level Orem Owlz and rookie-level Arizona League Angels. In 12 appearances (seven starts) for the two teams, he posted a cumulative 4–1 record and 2.64 ERA with 44 strikeouts across 44 1/3 innings pitched.

=== Detroit Tigers ===
On December 13, 2017, Hernandez and Troy Montgomery were traded to the Detroit Tigers for Ian Kinsler. Hernandez made 12 starts for the Low-A Connecticut Tigers and Single-A West Michigan Whitecaps in 2018, with a 2–7 record, 5.10 ERA, and 45 strikeouts across 47 2/3 innings pitched.

Hernandez made 21 starts for West Michigan during the 2019 season, logging a 9–7 record and 3.73 ERA with 90 strikeouts across 101 1/3 innings pitched. His fastball topped out at 95 miles per hour. He did not play in a game in 2020 due to the cancellation of the minor league season because of the COVID-19 pandemic. On November 11, it was announced that Hernandez would miss the entirety of the 2021 season after undergoing Tommy John surgery.

Hernandez returned to action in 2022 with the Single-A Lakeland Flying Tigers. In 14 appearances (13 starts) for Lakeland, he had a 3–5 record and 4.50 ERA with 51 strikeouts over 44 innings of work. Hernandez made 26 appearances (20 starts) for West Michigan during the 2023 season, posting a 3–8 record and 3.65 ERA with 97 strikeouts over 106 innings of work.

Hernandez began the 2024 season with the Double-A Erie SeaWolves, posting a 5–7 record and 4.34 ERA with 108 strikeouts in 120 1/3 innings pitched across 28 appearances (27 starts). He elected free agency following the season on November 4. On December 12, Hernandez re-signed on a minor league contract with the Tigers organization.

Hernandez made 34 appearances (19 starts) for the Triple-A Toledo Mud Hens in 2019, compiling a 3–7 record and 4.80 ERA with 96 strikeouts and one save across 114 1/3 innings pitched. Hernandez elected free agency following the season on November 6, 2025.

=== Hanwha Eagles ===
On November 29, 2025, Hernandez signed a one-year, $750,000 contract with the Hanwha Eagles of the KBO League. He made his debut on March 28, 2026, and allowed at least three runs in each of his first four starts. Hernandez made 16 starts for the Eagles, logging a 3–6 record and 4.92 ERA with 47 strikeouts across 71 1/3 innings pitched. Hernandez was released by Hanwha on July 20.
