= 2002 Conference USA baseball tournament =

- Teams: 8
- Format: Eight-team double-elimination tournament
- Finals site: Grainger Stadium; Kinston, North Carolina
- Champions: East Carolina (1st title)
- Winning coach: Keith LeClair (1st title)
- MVP: Darryl Lawhorn (East Carolina)

The 2002 Conference USA baseball tournament was the 2002 postseason baseball championship of the NCAA Division I Conference USA, held at Grainger Stadium in Kinston, North Carolina, from May 21 through 26. East Carolina defeated Houston in the championship game, earning the conference's automatic bid to the 2002 NCAA Division I baseball tournament.

== Regular season results ==
Team	W	L	PCT	GB	Seed
Houston	22	7	.759	-	1
Louisville	21	9	.700	1.5	2
TCU	19	11	.633	3.5	3
Southern Miss	18	11	.621	4	4
Tulane	17	13	.567	5.5	5
East Carolina	16	13	.552	6	6
South Florida	16	14	.533	6.5	7
Saint Louis	11	17	.393	10.5	8
Cincinnati	11	18	.379	11	--
Memphis	10	20	.333	12.5	--
Charlotte	9	21	.300	13.5	--
UAB	7	23	.233	15.5	--

- Records reflect conference play only.

== Bracket ==
First round
5	Tulane	3
**4**	**Southern Miss**	**7**
8	Saint Louis	0
**1**	**Houston**	**5**
8	Saint Louis	5
**5**	**Tulane**	**6**
**7**	**South Florida**	**10**
2	Louisville	0
**6**	**East Carolina**	**5**
3	TCU	1
**3**	**TCU**	**8**
2	Louisville	1

Second round
4	Southern Miss	1
**1**	**Houston**	**7**
5	Southern Miss	5
**4**	**Tulane**	**12**
7	South Florida	10
**6**	**East Carolina**	**12**
**7**	**South Florida**	**2**
3	TCU	1

Semifinals
5	Tulane	2
**1**	**Houston**	**7**
**6**	**East Carolina**	**3**
3	South Florida	2

Final
**6**	**East Carolina**	**4**
1	Houston	0

- **Bold** indicates the winner of the game.
- Italics indicate that the team was eliminated from the tournament.

== All-tournament team ==
Position	Player	School
C	Chris Snyder	Houston
IF	Jeff Baisley	South Florida
IF	Tommy Manzella	Tulane
IF	Jesse Crain	Houston
IF	Darryl Lawhorn	East Carolina
OF	Jon Kaplan	Tulane
OF	Michael Bourn	Houston
OF	Ryan Jones	East Carolina
DH	Clint King	Southern Miss
SP	Sam Narron	East Carolina
RP	Neal Sears	East Carolina
**MVP**	Darryl Lawhorn	East Carolina
