= Ian Kinsler =

American-Israeli baseball player (born 1982)

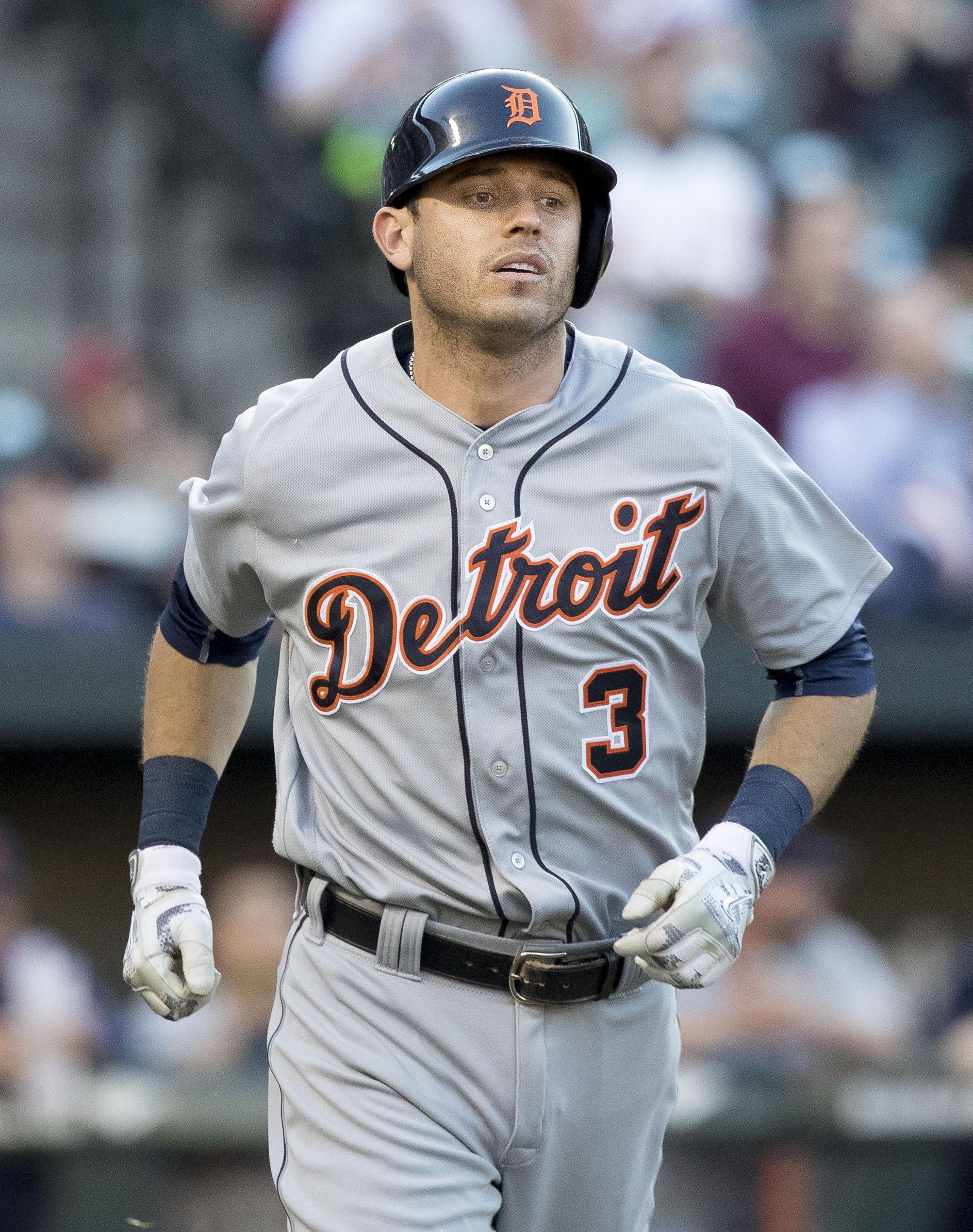
- Kinsler with the Detroit Tigers in 2016
- Second baseman
- Born: June 22, 1982 (age 44); Tucson, Arizona, U.S.
- Batted: Right Threw: Right

MLB debut
- April 3, 2006, for the Texas Rangers

Last MLB appearance
- August 12, 2019, for the San Diego Padres

MLB statistics
- Batting average: .269
- Home runs: 257
- Runs batted in: 909
- Stats at Baseball Reference

Teams
- Texas Rangers (2006–2013); Detroit Tigers (2014–2017); Los Angeles Angels (2018); Boston Red Sox (2018); San Diego Padres (2019)

Career highlights and awards
- 4× All-Star (2008, 2010, 2012, 2014); World Series champion (2018); 2× Gold Glove Award (2016, 2018); Texas Rangers Hall of Fame
Medals
Men's baseball
Representing United States
World Baseball Classic
Gold medal – first place	2017 Los Angeles	Team

Ian Michael Kinsler (Hebrew: איאן קינסלר; born June 22, 1982) is an American-Israeli former professional baseball player. He was a second baseman in Major League Baseball (MLB) for 14 seasons for the Texas Rangers, Detroit Tigers, Los Angeles Angels, Boston Red Sox, and San Diego Padres. Kinsler was a four-time All Star, two-time Gold Glove winner, and a member of the 2018 World Series champion Boston Red Sox.

Despite having been drafted in the 17th round of the 2000 MLB draft out of college, Kinsler rose to become a four-time All-Star and a member of the Sporting News' 2009 list of the 50 greatest current players in baseball. He was known as a five-tool player.

Kinsler twice hit 30 home runs and stole 30 bases in the same season (2009 and 2011), and is one of 16 ballplayers in major league history who have had multiple 30–30 seasons. In 2011, he also joined the 20–20 club for the third time, one season shy of the major league record for a second baseman. He hit for the cycle in a game in 2009, while getting hits in all six of his at bats. Kinsler is one of only four players in MLB history to record six hits in a game while hitting for the cycle; the others are Bobby Veach, Rondell White, and Christian Yelich, with Yelich being the only player to accomplish the feat since Kinsler.

Through 2013, Kinsler led the Texas Rangers in career stolen bases and power-speed number. In November 2013, he was traded to the Detroit Tigers for Prince Fielder. He has been awarded both a Fielding Bible Award (2015) and two Gold Glove Awards (2016 and 2018). Through 2019, on defense Kinsler had the best career range factor of any active second baseman in MLB, while on offense among all active players he was 3rd in power–speed number and in career runs scored, and 5th in career doubles. He retired following the end of the 2019 season with 1,999 career hits.

In international competition, Kinsler played for the United States national team at the 2017 World Baseball Classic and the Israel national team at the 2020 Summer Olympics (held in 2021), and managed Israel at the 2023 World Baseball Classic.

== Early life and high school ==
Kinsler was born in Tucson, Arizona, to a Jewish father and a Catholic mother. Kinsler's paternal great-grandparents, Benjamin and Rose Künstlich, were born in Germany and immigrated to the United States in the 1930s to escape the rising antisemitism in Europe prior to World War II. Benjamin and Rose anglicized their last name to Kinsler by the time their son, Jack, was born in the U.S. Ian Kinsler's father, Howard, had grown up in the Bronx and played basketball during his freshman season at the University of Arizona, and was a warden at a state prison on Tucson's southeast side. He has been a major influence on Kinsler. When Kinsler was four his father would toss him fly balls, and his dad says Kinsler would "get under them like he'd been doing it his whole life."

His father coached him until high school, and was especially tough. When Kinsler was 13 years old, and the best player on a PONY league team coached by his father that was playing for a championship, his dad caught Kinsler rolling his eyes as he gave the team orders. "I benched him, without hesitation", said his father. With Kinsler on the bench, the team lost the game.

Kinsler had a physical challenge to overcome. "I've had asthma my whole life", Kinsler said.

That was tough when I was younger. I woke up a lot and couldn't breathe, and had to go to the hospital in the middle of the night. It kind of held me back from athletics. I still have it, but I control it. Now I use an atomizer or an inhaler. When I was younger, I used this breathing machine... I hated that thing. I always wanted to run around and be active.

He graduated in 2000 from Canyon del Oro High School in the Tucson suburb of Oro Valley, Arizona. Kinsler helped lead the baseball team to state titles in 1997 and 2000. He hit .380 as a junior, to earn second-team All-League honors, and .504 with 5 home runs and 26 stolen bases during his senior year, in which he was named first-team All-State and first-team All-League. Four of his high school teammates also made it to the major leagues: Brian Anderson (his best friend in high school), Scott Hairston, Chris Duncan, and Shelley Duncan. In 2019 he was inducted into the Pima County Sports Hall of Fame.

== Draft and college ==
Kinsler was drafted by his home-state Arizona Diamondbacks after high school in the 29th round of the 2000 MLB draft, but did not feel ready for the pros. He opted instead to honour his commitment. He started his college career at Central Arizona College, where he hit .405 with 17 doubles, 37 RBIs, and 24 stolen bases, was named second-team All-ACCAC, and played shortstop alongside future major leaguers Scott Hairston and Rich Harden. The Diamondbacks drafted him again in 2001 (26th round), but he declined to sign because he felt that playing college baseball a little longer would help him develop his game.

Arizona State Sun Devils coach Pat Murphy secured his commitment out of junior college, getting him transfer to ASU in his sophomore year with the promise that he would play shortstop for the Sun Devils. But while he started briefly alongside fellow middle infielder Dustin Pedroia, he ended up spending much of the season on the bench.

University of Missouri Tigers coach Tim Jamieson spotted him in a summer league, and convinced him to head east for his junior year. Jamieson said, "I saw him take ground balls and thought, defensively, he was as good a middle infielder as I had ever seen. As for his bat, I didn't really care." While there, Kinsler had a .335 batting average, .416 on-base percentage, and .536 slugging percentage, with 16 steals in 17 attempts. He was named to the All-Big 12 Conference second team. Jamieson noted, "From the day Ian stepped through the doors here, you could see it on his face: He was on a mission."

Kinsler was then drafted a third time by the Texas Rangers in the 17th round (496th overall) in 2003 as a shortstop at the urging of area scout Mike Grouse. Grouse liked Kinsler's tools, makeup, desire, and gritty approach. In Grouse's scouting report, he wrote that Kinsler had a great feel for the game, athleticism, solid defensive skills, intensity, and leadership qualities. Grouse knew that Kinsler was probably being underrated by rival scouts who did not know that Kinsler had played with a foot stress fracture while at Missouri, "so [Kinsler] really couldn't run like I knew he could. I'd seen him in Wichita the year before, so I knew he was a plus runner. Most people ... didn't know that, so they probably downgraded him. But I knew it, and I wasn't telling anybody." Kinsler, for his part, says: "I thought I was a lot better than a 17th round pick. I thought I belonged in the top 10 rounds." Kinsler nonetheless agreed to sign with the Rangers on his 21st birthday, for $30,000.

Five years later, John Sickels wrote: "Only a handful of players from the 2003 draft are as good as Kinsler, and he's certainly outperformed many more heralded talents. Scouting and drafting will always be an inexact science/art." The pick was later lauded as "one of the greatest 17th round picks of all time."

== Minor league career (2003–2005) ==
=== 2003: Entering the pros ===
Kinsler signed quickly, and broke in as a shortstop in 2003. He batted .277 in 188 at-bats in his pro debut for the Spokane Indians in the Short-season Northwest League, while leading the team in steals (11) and triples (6). He then spent the 2003–04 winter in Arizona, working out with the Rangers' strength and conditioning coaches. He said: "I was probably 170 pounds, and I decided I needed to lift, put on some weight, and eat as much as I could. And I learned how to hit."

=== 2004: Breakout season ===
By early 2004, Kinsler had vaulted to the # 1 spot on Baseball America's Prospect Hot Sheet. John Sickels of ESPN described him as having "great plate discipline, power, and ... [being] a reasonably good defensive shortstop."

He had a breakout year in 2004. He split the season between two teams, beginning with the Low-A Clinton LumberKings, for which he hit .402/.465/.692 in 224 at bats. Kinsler was voted to start at shortstop for the Midwest League Western Division All Star team, while he was leading the league in batting, on-base percentage, slugging percentage, hits, doubles, extra-base hits, and runs scored, but did not play as he was promoted. Baseball America rated him the most exciting ballplayer and the # 8 prospect in the league. When a friend asked him what the secret was to his success, he responded: "Dude, I have no idea."

Kinsler was promoted two levels on June 12 to the Double-A Frisco RoughRiders. "When I first got called up, there were a million things running through my head", he said. "I was nervous, my hands were sweating. It was really exciting, but I didn't know what to expect. I was a little nervous that ... all of a sudden I wouldn't be able to hit." In June he was named the Rangers' Minor League Player of the Month. Frisco manager Tim Ireland observed:

I think he's succeeding because his swing is graceful and effortless. It's just a smooth swing, and he hits for power because he lets his swing work for him. Defensively, so far he's shown a real feel for shortstop. He's got good feet and soft hands, and he throws well enough.... He seems pretty legit to me.

In July, the Rangers agreed to send Kinsler and prospect right-hander Erik Thompson to the Colorado Rockies for Larry Walker, but Walker vetoed the trade.

He ended up hitting .300/.400/.480 for Frisco, in 277 at bats. Those numbers would have placed him fourth in OBP, seventh in slugging percentage, and eighth in the league's batting race had he received enough plate appearances to qualify for the title (he was short by about 60). Baseball America rated Kinsler the # 9 prospect in the Texas League.

Overall, in 501 at bats, Kinsler tied for first in the minor leagues in doubles (51), and was seventh in batting average (.345) and ninth in hits (173). He also had 20 home runs, 103 runs, 98 RBIs, 18 HBP, and 23 steals. Rangers manager Buck Showalter marveled at Kinsler's 51 doubles, saying: "Fifty... A lot of guys don't have 50 singles."

Baseball America rated him the No. 4 Rangers prospect, the No. 11 prospect in the minors, and a second-team Minor League All Star. Kinsler was also named a Sports Weekly All Star, and the Rangers' Tom Grieve Minor League Player of the Year. In addition, he was awarded the first annual Diamond in the Rough Award, which recognizes a minor leaguer who "defies the odds" and rises from obscurity to play himself into prospect status during a breakout season. For his part, Kinsler noted simply: "It is fun to come to the ballpark every day when you are playing good baseball."

Towards the end of the season, Sickels augmented his scouting report on Kinsler by reporting that he was, "a good athlete, not super-toolsy, but strong for his size with speed a notch above average. His swing looked short, quick, and sharp...Overall, he is a solid all-around player who makes the most of his natural ability."

Kinsler spent the winter of 2004–05 playing for the Peoria Saguaros of the Arizona Fall League, improving his versatility by getting work in at second base. There, he hit .306/.369/.500. A scout in Arizona noted that his swing was so effortless, yet generated so much line drive power, that: "It's like he's swinging a Wiffleball bat out there."

=== 2005: Transitioning to second base ===
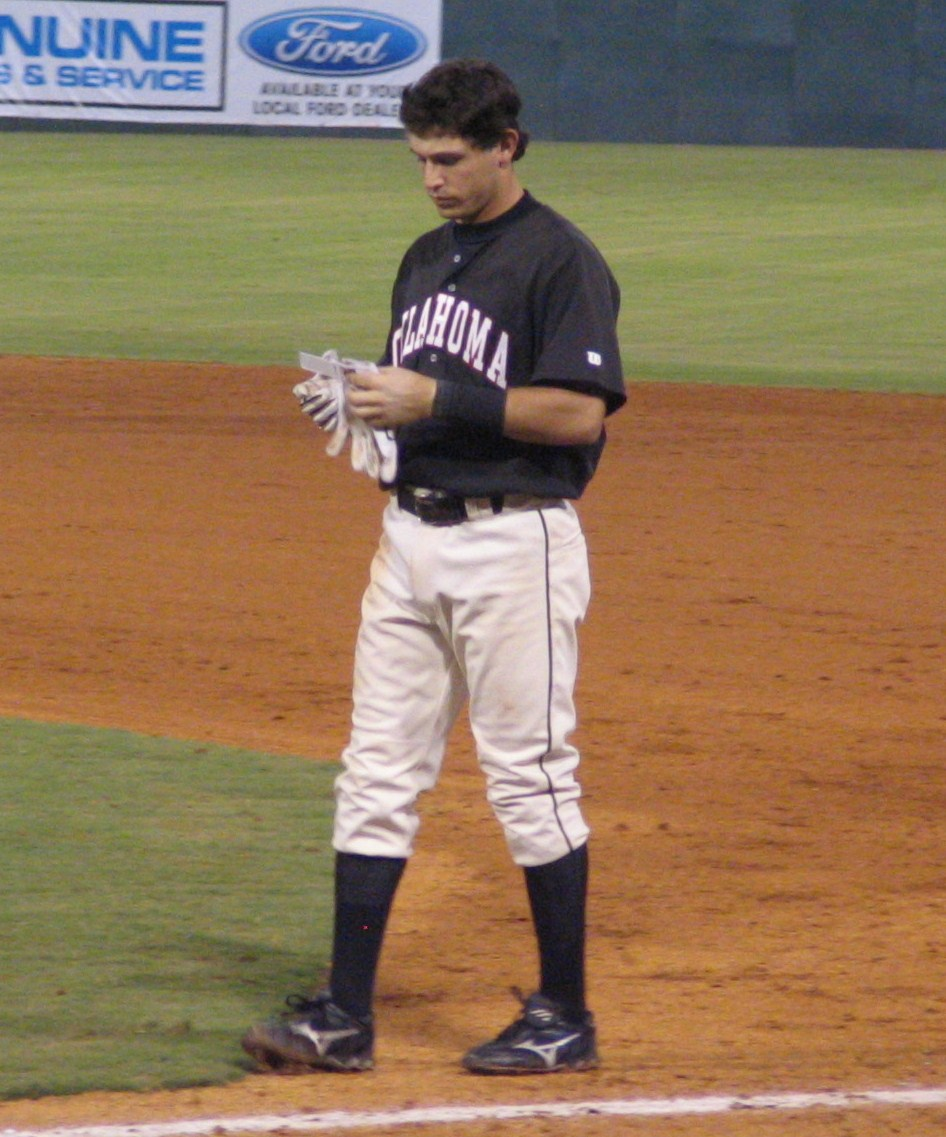
Kinsler with the Oklahoma RedHawks in September 2005

Invited to the parent club's 2005 spring training, he hit .327 while slugging .612. Kinsler spent 2005 at Triple-A with the Oklahoma RedHawks, transitioning from shortstop to second base because that is where the organization anticipated he would play in the future, in the event that Alfonso Soriano no longer played second base for the major league team. He was selected to the mid-season Pacific Coast League All Star team in June, and came in a close second to Mitch Jones in the 2005 Triple-A Home Run Derby.

For the season, in 530 at bats he hit .274 with 23 home runs, 102 runs (tied for tenth in the minor leagues), 94 RBIs, and 12 steals in 14 attempts. Kinsler cracked the Baseball America Top 100 Prospects list, ranking 98th. On the side, during the season he kept an on-line journal for MinorLeagueBaseball.com.

== Major league career ==
=== Texas Rangers (2006–2013) ===
==== 2006: Rookie ====
With Alfonso Soriano having been traded in the off-season, Kinsler won the Rangers' starting second base job in spring training in 2006 over Mark DeRosa. "Ian Kinsler came as advertised", said Showalter.

He made his major league debut against the Boston Red Sox on Opening Day on April 3, 2006, and got his first major league hit in his first major league at bat, off Curt Schilling. Kinsler said:

The crowd was full; I had the butterflies going, so to get that hit was huge. The family was in town.... To go out there and face one of the best pitchers of all time, you've got to be locked in. It's your first game, your first big league experience—it was unbelievable to face that guy.

He was hitting .476 when he dislocated his left thumb sliding head-first into second base on April 11, 2006, and was placed on the disabled list. "I knew it wasn't good when I looked down and I saw the top part of the thumb pointing in at me", Kinsler said. He came back 41 games later on May 25, and went 3–4 with a single and two home runs, to lead the Rangers to an 8–7 victory over the Oakland Athletics. "I hope the fans don't expect that much every night", he joked.

While Kinsler started off the season batting ninth in the lineup, in June Showalter moved him up to seventh. "I think as Ian's career progresses, he'll move up in the batting order", predicted Showalter. For the season, he started 31 games batting seventh, 30 batting eighth, 20 batting sixth, 19 batting ninth, 12 batting second, 3 batting leadoff, 2 batting third, and 1 batting fifth.

Kinsler finished 2006 with a .286 batting average, 14 home runs, 55 RBIs, and a team-leading 11 stolen bases in 423 at bats. He batted .300 with runners in scoring position, and .300 when the game was tied. He led all AL rookies with 27 doubles, and his .454 slugging percentage was the seventh-best in a season since 2000 by an AL rookie with at least 400 at bats. Defensively, in August he tied a team record by recording five double plays in one game. He also led all American League (AL) second basemen in both range factor (5.58) and errors (18). He was named Rangers 2006 Rookie of the Year.

==== 2007: 20–20 season ====
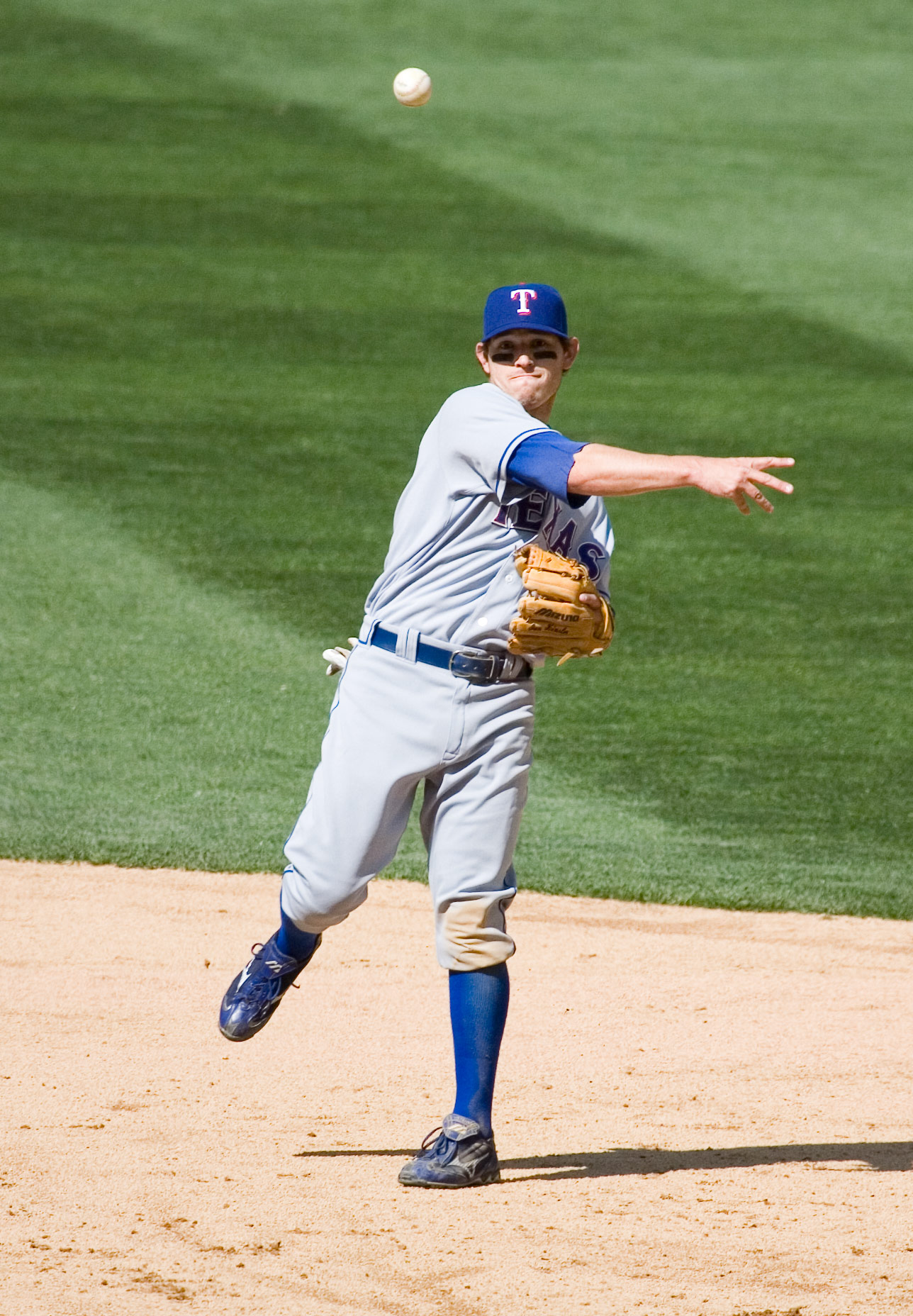
Kinsler in April 2007

During the 2006–07 off-season, Kinsler focused on building up his legs to improve his speed, durability, and agility. In spring training in 2007, he hit .429, led the AL in RBIs (19), and was sixth in the major leagues in hits (27).

His hitting form continued into the season, and Kinsler was named the AL Player of the Week for the period ending April 15. He batted .476 (10-for-21) that week with four home runs, eight RBIs, seven runs scored, and a 1.095 slugging percentage. His nine home runs in April tied the team record for that month (shared by Iván Rodríguez (2000), Alex Rodriguez (2002), and Carl Everett (2003)), and were the most ever in the season's first month by a Major League second baseman. Kinsler said: "I'm trying to put good swings on the ball, and if it goes out, it goes out." He batted .298 with 22 RBIs for the month, and was also voted the Rangers' Player of the Month for April.

On July 2, Kinsler went on the disabled list with a stress fracture in his left foot; he did not come back until July 31, and missed 26 games. He tied a major league record on August 25, when he had eight plate appearances in a nine-inning game (a 30–3 win over Baltimore).

In 2007, Kinsler hit 20 home runs and was 23-for-25 in stolen base attempts (a 92% success rate). He became the sixth player in franchise history to reach the 20–20 plateau, joining Alfonso Soriano (2005), Iván Rodríguez (1999), Rafael Palmeiro (1993), Bobby Bonds (1978), and Toby Harrah (1975 and 1977). He did it despite his stress fracture, which kept him under 500 at bats. His 23 stolen bases and 96 runs led the Rangers.

Kinsler finished the season seventh in the AL in power/speed number (21.4), ninth in sacrifice hits (8) and steals of third base (4), and tied for tenth in bunt hits (5). He was also tied for fourth in the league in steals of third (4), eighth in line drive percentage (23%), and tied for ninth in sacrifice hits (8). He began to hit higher in the batting order, as he batted second in 48 games, leadoff in 26, seventh in 24, sixth in 19, ninth in 10, and eighth in 2. On defense, Kinsler led all major league second basemen in range factor (5.69).

==== 2008: All-Star ====
In February 2008, Kinsler signed a five-year deal worth $22 million guaranteed with a $10 million option for 2013. The contract was at the time largest the Rangers have ever made to a player whom they drafted and developed. "Ian represents the past, present, and future of this organization", said assistant general manager Thad Levine.

"It's a lot of money", Kinsler said. "I've never imagined being in this position in my life." "This is a big day for me and my family", he reflected. "I've been working my whole life to get to this point, since my dad first started taking me out in the backyard and started throwing the baseball with me."

Kinsler was delighted when Rangers manager Ron Washington ultimately committed to Kinsler being the team's leadoff hitter in 2008. "I didn't think he was the prototype leadoff hitter, but the guy proved me wrong", Washington said. "He'll take a walk, or get one run for us with one swing of the bat. He can bunt, he can run, and he can hit the ball to the other side."

Through mid-May 2008, Kinsler had the best career stolen-base percentage (88.5%) of anyone in Rangers/Senators history with at least 40 attempts. "It's part of my game", said Kinsler. "It's not one of the first things I'm known for." According to scouts, his ability on the basepaths is due to innate instincts and his "twitch speed" rather than his pure running speed. Grouse, who signed him, says that Kinsler also "goes from first to third faster than anyone, because he has that God-given ability to read the ball so well off the bat."

During a mid-June rain delay at Shea Stadium, Kinsler hopped to his feet, raced from the dugout and dove head-first across the wet tarp covering the infield as though it was a giant Slip 'n Slide. Four teammates followed, receiving a large ovation from the New York Mets fans. Shea Stadium security ushered them off the field, drawing a chorus of boos. "We had some good routines going", said Kinsler. "It was awesome."

Kinsler was a 2008 AL All Star at the 79th All Star Game at Yankee Stadium. It was his most exciting moment in baseball to that point. He was a reserve voted in by his peers. In the fan balloting, Dustin Pedroia, who finished with nearly 1.3 million votes, beat him by 34,243 votes. In the game, Kinsler hit 1-for-5 and stole a base. He was called out attempting to steal another base, though replays demonstrated that the umpire had missed the call. The Washington Post and ESPN baseball writer Jayson Stark picked Kinsler as the AL MVP for the first half of the season.

Kinsler had an MLB-best 25-game hitting streak in June and July. The team-best hitting streak of 28 belongs to Gabe Kapler.

Through July 28, Kinsler was leading the AL in batting average (.331), runs (90), hits (145), total bases (232), extra base hits (55), at bats (438), and plate appearances (499). He was also second in doubles (37) and power/speed number (17.9), third in sacrifices (7), fourth in singles (90), sixth in sacrifice flies (6), seventh in stolen bases (26), triples (4), and on-base percentage (.392), and eighth in OPS (.922). "Kinsler", said Seattle Mariners left fielder Raúl Ibañez, "is the engine that makes that offense go."

However, on August 17 he injured the left side of his groin on a defensive play, suffering a sports hernia that ultimately required season-ending surgery. He missed the last 37 games of the season. "I really didn't have a decision", Kinsler said. "If I want to fix this injury, then I have to have surgery."

In 2008, despite missing the last six weeks of the season, Kinsler was third in the AL in times advanced from first to third on a single (17), fourth in batting average (.319) and power/speed number (21.3), fifth in steals of third base (8) and "bases taken" (23; advanced on fly balls, passed balls, wild pitches, balks, etc.), sixth in line drive percentage (24%) and in extra base hit percentage (10.8% of all plate appearances), eighth in runs (102) and OPS (.892), ninth in sacrifice hits (8) and home runs on the road (14), and tenth in stolen bases (26; while only being caught twice—a 93% success rate) and lowest strikeout percentage (11.5% of at bats).

He hit .413 with runners in scoring position. He was one of only three batters in the AL to have at least 18 home runs and 18 stolen bases in both 2007 and 2008, along with Alex Rodriguez and Grady Sizemore. His 41 doubles ranked second in franchise history to Alfonso Soriano's 43 in 2005. He had a .377 on-base percentage as a leadoff hitter, the third-best mark in the AL, and his .521 slugging percentage was the highest for a leadoff batter in the AL. Kinsler's .381 on-base percentage as a leadoff hitter over the 2005–08 seasons was the fourth-highest in the major leagues.

"Most hitters have [a location] that you can exploit", said All Star pitcher Justin Duchscherer. "This guy has trouble with fastballs in. This guy has trouble with breaking balls down. [Kinsler] doesn't have a hole like that." In the field, he led all major league second basemen with a 5.77 range factor and 123 double plays, but also in errors with 18.

Kinsler was mentioned as an MVP candidate before his injury by writers at ESPN, the Dallas News, the Los Angeles Times, and the Washington Post. He could have conceivably rivaled Pedroia for MVP, if not for the sports hernia that cut his 2008 campaign short a month and a half. "I think he just missed having an MVP year", manager Ron Washington said. "If luck [had been] on our side and he [had stayed] healthy, he would have run away with it." In the end, he received a single 10th-place vote from Jeff Wilson of the Fort Worth Star-Telegram.

==== 2009: Hitting for the cycle, and joining the 30–30 club ====
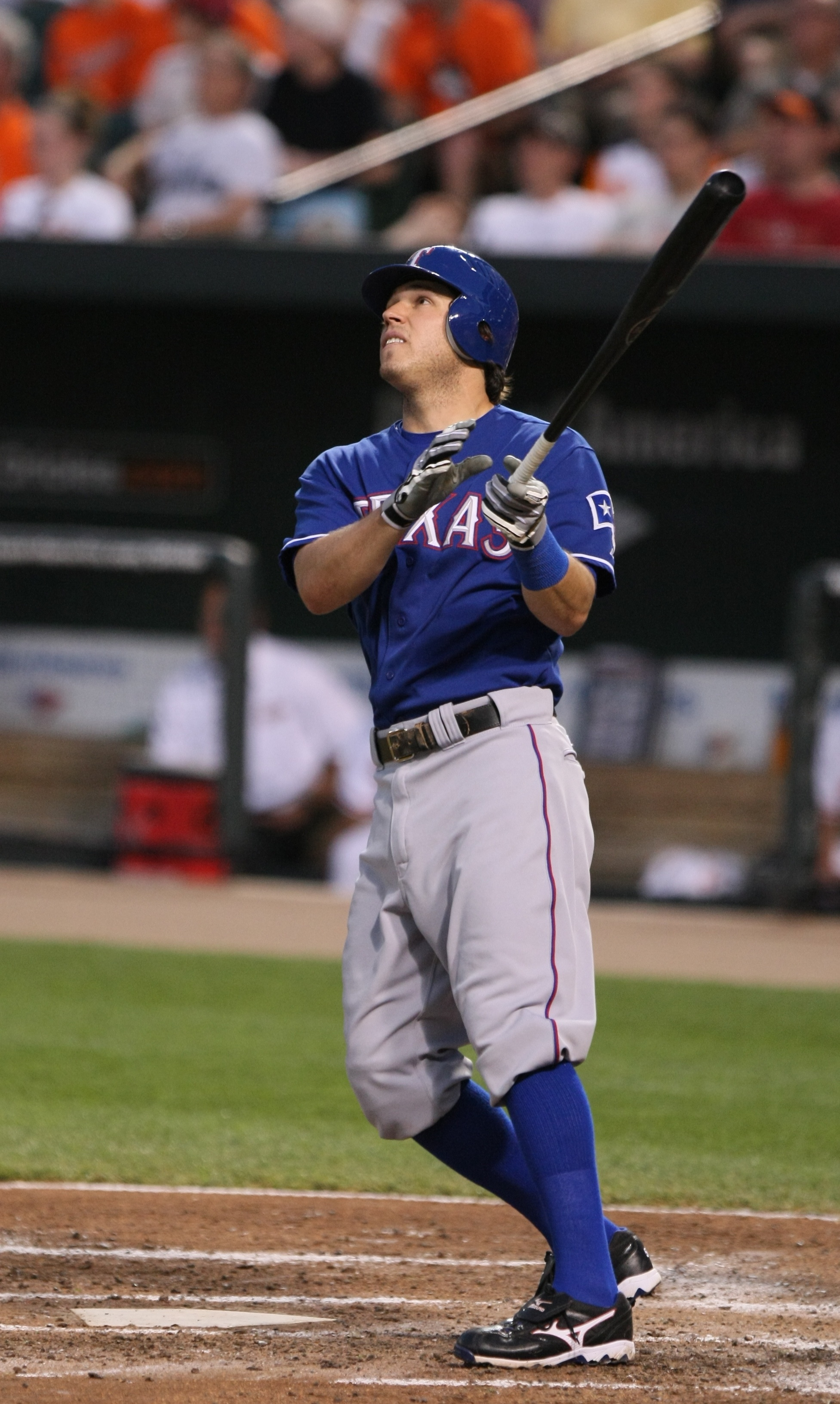
Kinsler batting against Baltimore, April 2009

In 2009, Kinsler was named # 24 on the Sporting News' list of the 50 greatest current players in baseball. A panel of 100 baseball people, many of them members of the Baseball Hall of Fame and winners of major baseball awards, was polled to arrive at the list.

"It was awesome. It was seriously one of the coolest things I've seen. I felt like a little kid. I was jumping up and down, screaming at the top of my lungs. It had no effect on him running the bases, but I felt like I was a part of it. It's one of those things you don't see very often. To hit the cycle and go 6-for-6. Six hits is a good week for some guys. At the same time, I'm not surprised because Kins is one of the best hitters I've seen. That's unbelievable."

— Teammate Chris Davis, commenting on Kinsler's 6–6 game.

On April 15, 2009, in a game against the Baltimore Orioles, Kinsler hit for the cycle, becoming only the fourth Ranger to do so (and, at the time, the only right-handed Ranger). In the same game, Kinsler became only the second player in Ranger history to get 6 hits in a single game (the first having been Alfonso Soriano, on May 8, 2004), and the first to do so in a 9-inning game. His five runs and four extra base hits in the game matched two other team records.

"It was a thing of beauty", teammate Marlon Byrd said. "I loved it." Kinsler's dual feat was the first in the modern baseball era. The last major league player to have six hits in a game while hitting for the cycle was William Farmer Weaver, for the Louisville Colonels on August 12, 1890. Kinsler's 13 total bases were also one base shy of Jose Canseco's June 13, 1994, team record. Only three other players in the prior 55 years had had six hits, five runs, and four extra-base hits in a game, the most recent having been Shawn Green of the Los Angeles Dodgers in 2002.

Kinsler was named AL co-Player of the Week on April 20, 2009. For the week, in 30 plate appearances he led the major leagues in batting average (.556), hits (15), extra base hits (7), and runs (9), and tied for the lead in doubles (4). He also had a .600 on-base percentage and 1.000 slugging percentage, with a triple, two home runs, and six stolen bases. "He's incredible", said teammate Hank Blalock.

On June 16 against Houston, Kinsler opened the first inning with his ninth career leadoff homer, surpassing the club record of eight, shared by Mike Hargrove, Oddibe McDowell, and Michael Young. On May 21, Kinsler stole third base in the fifth inning, setting a club record for career steals of third at 18. Furthermore, at the time Kinsler had never been caught trying to steal third. Rick Paulas of ESPN called Kinsler his "first quarter MVP."

Through July 1, Kinsler led the AL in power-speed number (17.5), was third in home runs (19), fourth in runs (55) and total bases (160), sixth in extra base hits (38) and at bats (307), seventh in sacrifice flies (4), and ninth in stolen bases (16) and sacrifices (8), while batting .359 against left-handers and .333 with runners on base.

Kinsler narrowly missed making the AL All-Star team. First, though he had led all AL second basemen as of June 30, with 2,170,100 fan votes (fifth-most votes of all AL players, just ahead of Dustin Pedroia's 2,163,270), Pedroia passed him on the last day in last-minute voting. Then, he just missed making the team as a reserve in player voting, coming in second again, this time to Toronto's Aaron Hill. He missed in his third chance, as AL All Star team and Tampa Bay manager Joe Maddon did not pick him as a reserve. He missed a fourth opportunity to make the team, in the Sprint Final Vote competition for the final spot on the team, coming in second to Brandon Inge of the Tigers. A fifth opportunity presented itself when Pedroia pulled out of the All Star Game to spend time with his pregnant wife—and as Kinsler had finished second in fan voting, in player voting, and in the Final Vote competition, he appeared a likely candidate to replace his fellow second baseman. But Maddon went with one of his own to replace Pedroia, Tampa Bay's first baseman Carlos Peña, who was leading the league in homers but batting .228 (and who had come in fourth in the Final Vote competition, behind Kinsler and Chone Figgins). A sixth and final opportunity presented itself when Evan Longoria withdrew because of a finger infection; but again Maddon (a former Angels coach) chose someone else as a replacement, this time Figgins of the Angels, who had come in third in the Final Vote competition (behind Kinsler).

Bleacher Reports' Andrew Nuschler observed: "Maddon spent his tenure as the AL All Star manager finding new and inventive ways to give Ian Kinsler the middle finger." And Sports Illustrated's Jacob Osterhout took note, writing:

It is an absolute travesty that Ian Kinsler is not the starting second baseman for the American League. Dustin Pedroia, who IS the starting second baseman, has hit only three home runs and has 36 RBIs. Kinsler, on the other hand, has hit 20 home runs and has 63 RBIs. The fact that Kinsler isn't even a reserve makes it hard to take the All Star Game seriously.

At the All-Star Game, as a tribute to Kinsler, his teammate and close friend Michael Young wore wristbands with Kinsler's number 5.

On July 11, Kinsler stole third base for the 21st time in his career, building on his team record, without ever having been thrown out. On July 19, 2009, Kinsler became one of only six or seven batters to have hit both a leadoff and walk-off home run in the same game, the others being Billy Hamilton (1893, disputed), Vic Power (1957), Darin Erstad (2000), Reed Johnson (2003), Chris Young (2010), and Pete Crow-Armstrong (2026).

Kinsler suffered a strained left hamstring on July 28, and missed 11 games while on the disabled list.

Kinsler, who already had 30 stolen bases, hit his 30th home run on September 25, becoming the only major leaguer to join the 30–30 club in 2009, and the 34th major leaguer ever. He became only the second player in Rangers' history to have a 30–30 season (joining Alfonso Soriano, who did it in 2005), and joined Soriano (who also had 30–30 seasons in 2002 and 2003 for the Yankees) and Brandon Phillips (2007) as the only 30–30 second basemen in Major League history. "It's an incredible accomplishment", said Michael Young. "I've played with guys who have had some incredible seasons here, but 30–30 is something special. He deserves a lot of credit. He battled all season long. That's what separates the great players from the good ones."

He led the AL in power-speed#, with a 31.0. Through 2009, he had the second-highest steal success rate among active players with at least 100 attempts, at 87.5% (91-of-104). Carlos Beltrán was the best, at 88.3%. Sharing his philosophy on stealing bases, he said: "It takes the art of stealing away if you do it when you're four runs up or four runs down, and the opposing team is just worried about getting outs, not stolen bases. The idea is to steal them when you need them."

He also showed a good eye at the plate. Of 15 Rangers who had at least 100 at bats, his rate of only one strikeout per 8.31 at bats was the best on the team. Similarly, he made contact on 87% of his swings, the best contact rate on the team.

Playing 144 games, he also had 13 home runs against lefties (2nd in the league), stole third base 11 times (3rd), hit 47% of his hits for extra bases (7th-best in the AL), was 7th in the AL in stolen bases, scored 101 runs (10th), and had 5 bunt hits (10th). On defense, he led AL second baseman in "zone runs"s (17), was 2nd in assists (451) and range factor/game (4.86), and was 5th in putouts (249).

==== 2010: All-Star ====
In December 2009, Washington said Kinsler would bat second in 2010. "I think Kinsler performs better when he's in the mix hitting at the top of the lineup in the first inning", Washington said. "When he has to wait to hit, I think it takes a lot away from him." But by early March, it was reported that he would bat fifth. Washington said, however, that that would not keep Kinsler from running: "I will not slow him down. He is a threat. I will not take away that threat. I'm not stopping Kins." On days when Julio Borbon was not batting leadoff, Kinsler was to move up to the top of the lineup. In the end, Kinsler started 60 games batting 3rd, 20 games batting 5th, 16 games batting 6th, and 6 games leading off.

In spring training, while he was batting .400, Kinsler slipped on a patch of wet grass during pre-game warm-ups. He rolled his right ankle, and suffered a sprain of the ligaments above it (referred to as a "high ankle sprain"), as well as a small bone bruise at the tip of his tibia at the back of his ankle. He missed three weeks of spring training, and began the season on the disabled list. Washington said: "We miss his presence. We miss his threat. We miss what he brings on the defensive end. We miss his leadership." He made his initial 2010 appearance on April 30, after having missed the first 20 games of the season.

Batting .304 at the time with a .412 on-base percentage (4th in the AL), he was selected as a reserve to the All-Star team, his second All-Star Game. An appreciative Kinsler said: "It's a huge honor." He had finished third among AL second basemen in fan voting behind Robinson Canó and Pedroia, but Pedroia was injured, and Kinsler was picked to replace him. He had also finished second among AL second basemen in voting by AL players. On July 29 he went on the disabled list again, this time for a strained left groin, and was not reactivated until September 1.

Kinsler finished the season batting .286, with a career-high on-base percentage of .382. His .985 fielding percentage was 5th-best in the league, and he had the highest career range factor/game of all active major league second basemen (5.201). With his two stints on the disabled list, he played in only 103 games.

In the first round of the playoffs, against the Tampa Bay Rays, Kinsler batted .444/.500/.944 in five games, leading the majors with 3 home runs (tied) and 6 RBIs in the division series. He hit safely and scored a run in all five games, joining Boston's Nomar Garciaparra as the only two players to start their post-season careers with at least one hit—and with at least one hit and one run—in each of five consecutive games. As teammate Nelson Cruz also hit three home runs, it marked the second time in Major League history that two teammates each hit three homers in a postseason series of five games or fewer (the other two to do it were Babe Ruth and Lou Gehrig, in the 1928 World Series). For the first two rounds of the playoffs, Kinsler hit safely in 9 of 11 games, and batted .342 with 3 HRs, a playoff-high 9 RBIs, 6 runs, 2 stolen bases, an OBP of .409, and an OPS of 1.067.

==== 2011: 30–30 club, redux ====
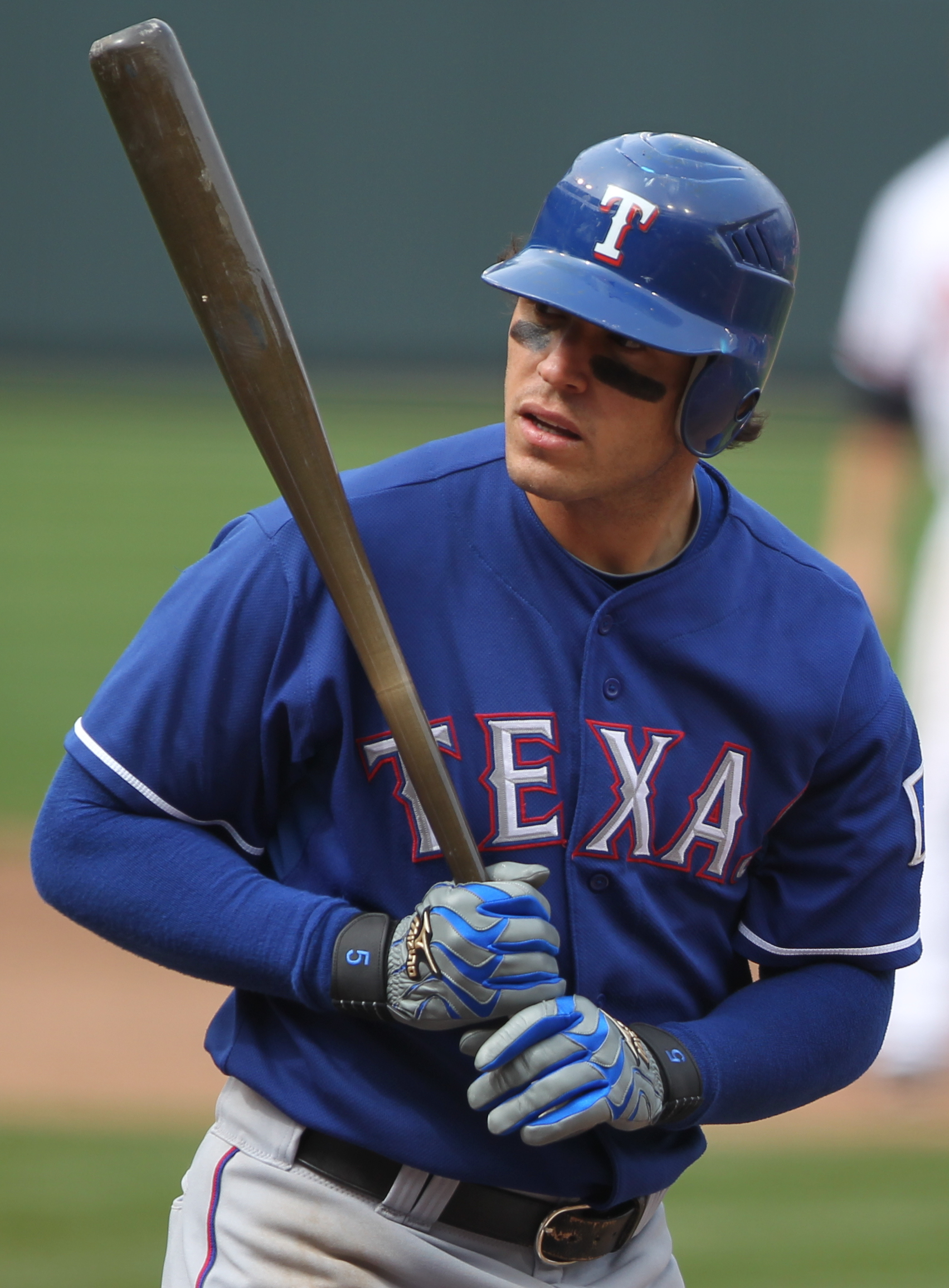
Kinsler in 2011

On April 2, 2011, Kinsler became the first player in major league history to hit a lead-off home run in the first two games of a season (giving him a total of 15 lead-off homers in his career). In his next game against the Red Sox, he hit another home run in the third inning. Kinsler and Nelson Cruz also became the first two teammates to homer in each of the first three games in a season. The two also joined Dean Palmer (1992) as the only Texas ballplayers to ever homer in the first three games of the season.

In September, Kinsler tied his own Rangers record, which he set in 2009, with his seventh leadoff home run of the season. He also hit his 20th career leadoff homer, becoming the 34th player in major league baseball history to have hit at least 20. Since his first season in 2006, his 20 lead-off homers were the 6th-most behind Alfonso Soriano (31), Hanley Ramírez (25), Jimmy Rollins (24), Curtis Granderson (24), and Rickie Weeks (24).

He stole 28 consecutive bases without being caught, breaking his own club record, which he had set in 2007–08.

Kinsler joined the 30–30 club, for the second time. He became the 12th player in major league history to have multiple 30–30 seasons. The only other infielders in major league history who had had multiple 30–30 seasons as of 2011 were Alfonso Soriano, Howard Johnson, and Jeff Bagwell. He also joined the 20–20 (home runs–steals) club for the third time in his career. Joe Morgan, who did it four seasons, is the only second baseman to have joined the 20–20 club more times.

In 2011, Kinsler was second in the AL in runs scored (121; the fifth-highest season total in Rangers' history), 5th in home runs (32; a career high) and walks (89), and 9th in stolen bases (30) and extra base hits (70). He was also third in power-speed # (31.0; behind Jacoby Ellsbury and Curtis Granderson), and had the best walks-to-strikeouts ratio in the major leagues, with 1.25 walks per each strikeout. On defense, his career range factor of 5.092 was the highest among active major league second basemen, and in 2011 he led AL second basemen in double plays, with 103.

His 136 career stolen bases through season-end were third-most in Rangers history, behind Bump Wills (161) and Toby Harrah (143), and his career stolen-base percentage was the third-best rate among active players with at least 120 attempts.

His 124 career home runs were the 5th-most in the first six years of any second baseman's career, behind Dan Uggla (183), Joe Gordon (142), Chase Utley (130), and Alfonso Soriano (126).

On October 4, in Game 4 of the AL Division Series against the Rays, Kinsler led off the game with a home run; the Rangers went on to win 4–3 over Tampa Bay and advance to the next round of the playoffs.

==== 2012: All-Star ====
In April 2012, the Rangers gave Kinsler a five-year, $75 million contract extension, with a $10 million option for a sixth year and a $5 million buyout if the team were to not pick up the option. The extension replaced the team's $10 million option for 2013 with a $13 million salary, and paid him $16 million in both 2014 and 2015, $14 million in 2016, and $11 million in 2017. A team option in 2018 could become guaranteed at $12 million, and included a $5 million buyout. The contract made Kinsler the highest-paid second baseman in baseball.

Kinsler was an All-Star again in 2012, for the third time. For the season, he was second in the AL in plate appearances (731), third in at bats (655) and runs (105), fifth in power-speed number (20.0), sixth in doubles (42), and eighth in hit by pitch (10).

==== 2013: Rangers' all-time stolen base leader ====
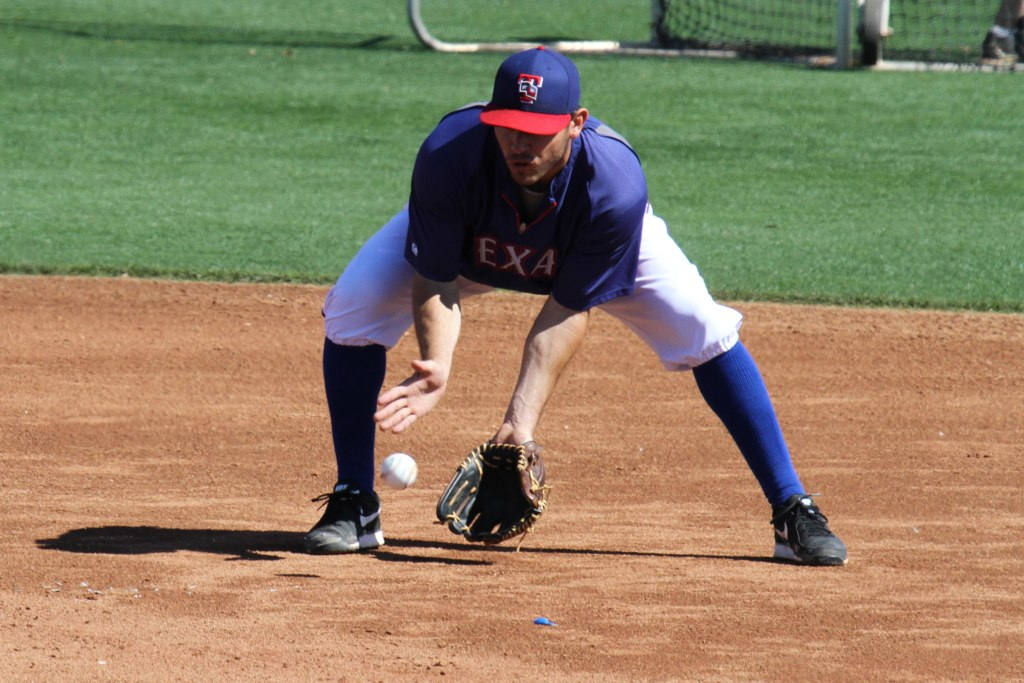
Kinsler fields a ball during spring training in 2013

In 2013, Kinsler struck out once every 10.4 plate appearances, making him the third-toughest batter to strike out in the AL, and was the sixth-toughest batter to double up in the league (109.0 at bats/double play). He finished the season tied for fifth among active players in leadoff home runs. He led the Rangers, all-time in career stolen bases (172), hit by pitch (57), and power-speed number (163.6), and was fifth in runs (748), seventh in doubles (249) and walks (462), eighth in home runs (156), and ninth in hits (1,145) and RBIs (539). FanGraphs ranked him as the 56th-best baserunner in baseball history at the end of 2013.

In 2022, he was inducted into the Rangers Hall of Fame.

=== Detroit Tigers (2014–17) ===
In November 2013, Kinsler was traded to the Detroit Tigers for Prince Fielder in a one-for-one trade of All-Stars, with the Tigers sending Texas $30 million to cover part of the difference in the players' salaries. Kinsler received former longtime Detroit player Alan Trammell's permission to wear uniform #3, which Trammell had worn for most of his career.

==== 2014: All-Star ====
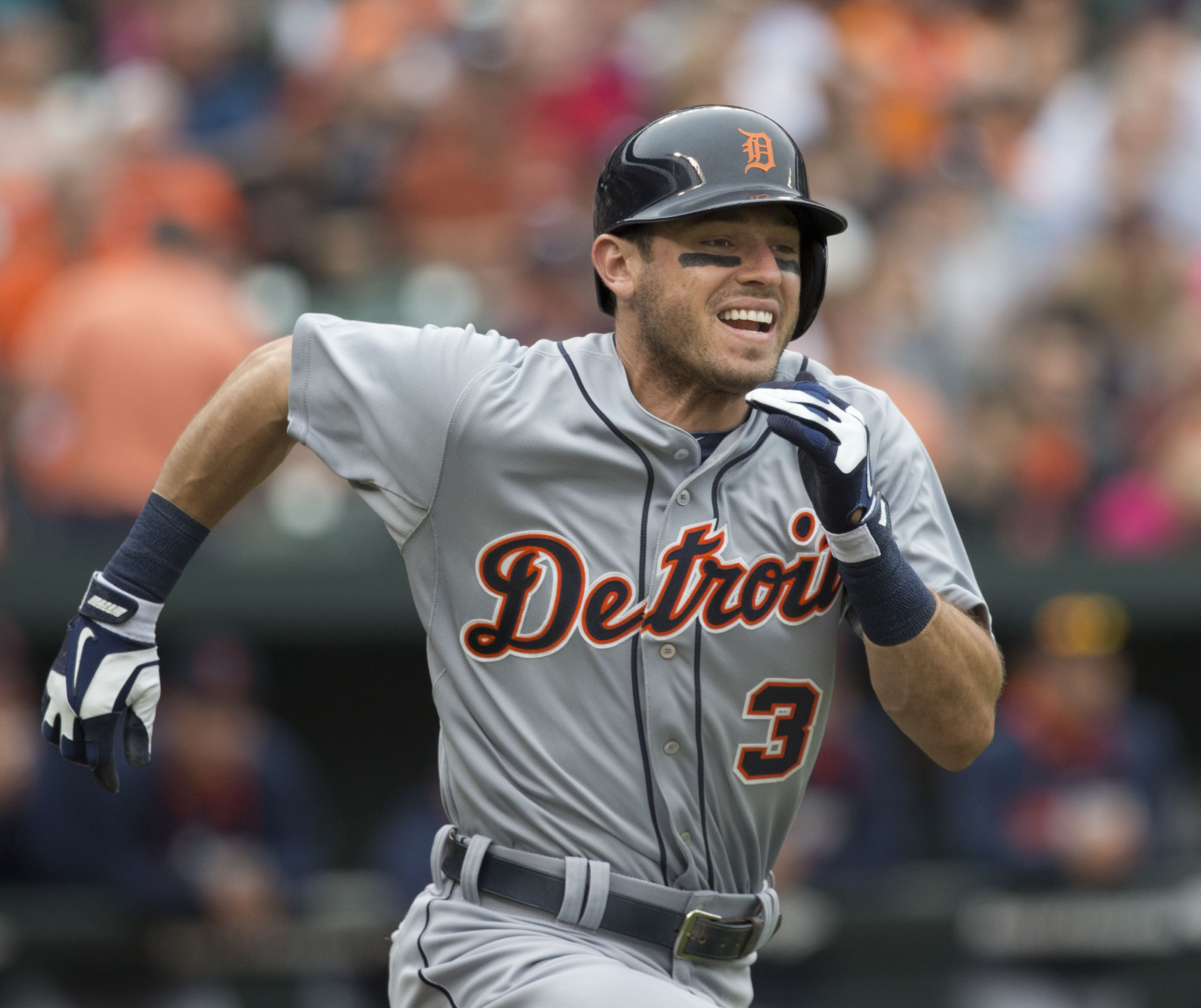
Kinsler in 2014

In 2014, Kinsler was named to his fourth All-Star team, as a replacement for an injured Víctor Martínez. For the season he led the AL in at bats (684; also an all-time Tigers record), was 4th in hits (188) and doubles (40), 5th in runs scored (100; scoring 100 runs for the fifth time in his career), and 7th in power–speed number (15.9). He was the 10th-toughest batter in the league to strike out (once per every 9.19 plate appearances), and was one of seven AL players to hit at least 15 home runs and steal at least 15 bases.

On defense, he led the AL in putouts (290) and was third in assists (467) and fielding percentage (.988), among all second basemen. Through 2014, Kinsler had the best career range factor of any active second baseman in MLB, at 4.881.

On November 5, Kinsler was awarded the Wilson Defensive Player of the Year Award for second base.

==== 2015: Fielding Bible Award ====
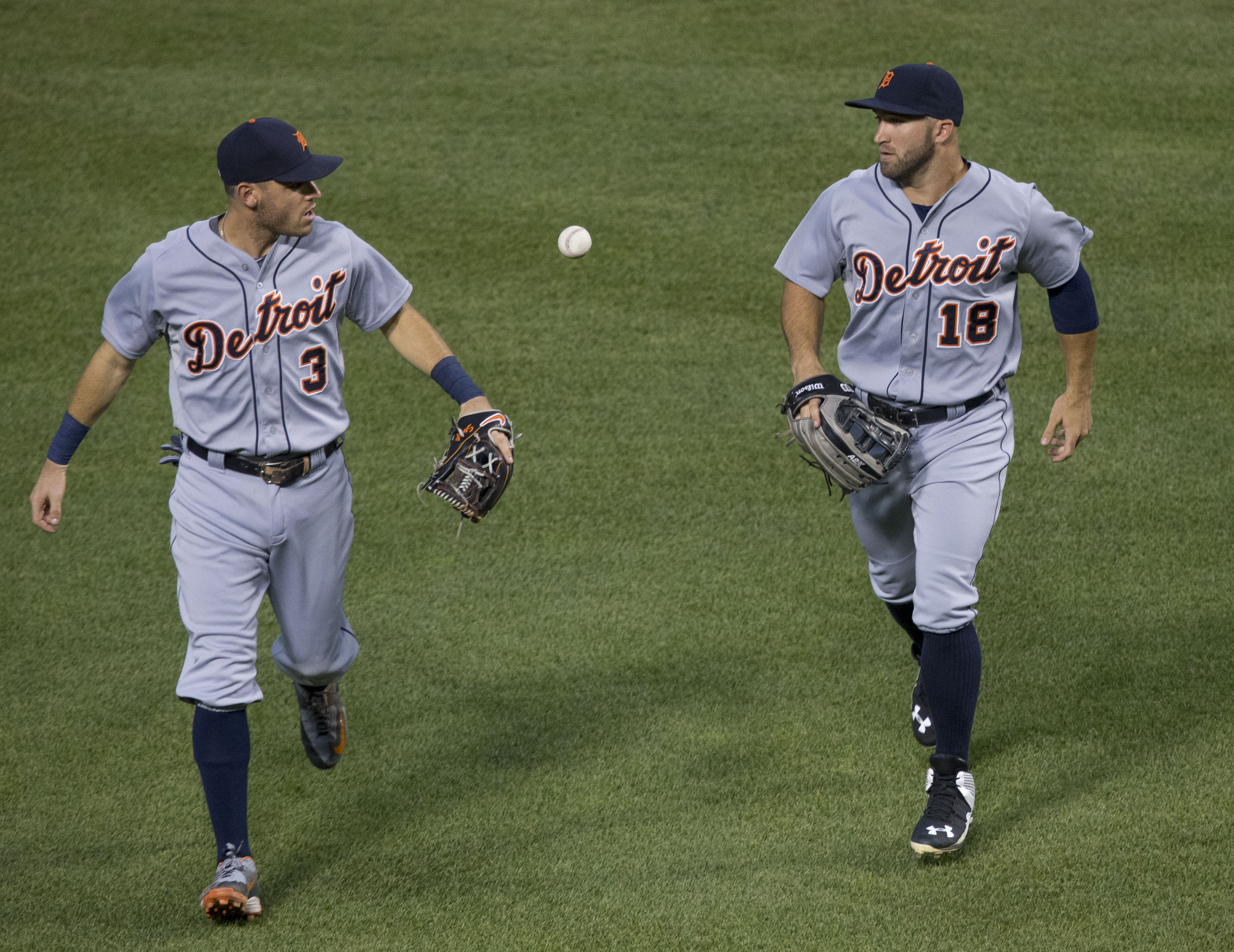
Kinsler (left) with Tyler Collins, 2015

On September 10, 2015, Kinsler recorded his 1,500th career hit, a single off of Bryan Shaw of the Cleveland Indians. For the 2015 season, he hit .296, his best batting average since posting a career-high .319 mark in 2008, while collecting 11 home runs and 73 RBIs. For the season he led the major leagues in multi-hit games (61), and was fourth in the AL in hits (185), 6th in at bats (624, and 10th in runs scored (94) and at-bats-per-strikeout (7.8).

On defense, he was second in the AL in putouts (289), assists (425), and double plays (109) among all second basemen. His single-season defensive WARs in 2014 (2.9) and 2015 (2.6) were the second- and seventh-best in Tigers' history. Following the 2015 season, Kinsler was awarded the Fielding Bible Award as the best-fielding second baseman in MLB. His 19 Defensive Runs Saved (DRS) were six better than any other MLB second baseman that season, according to FanGraphs. His 6.3 Ultimate Zone Rating (UZR) was the best in the American League, and second only to Miami's Dee Gordon. His 2.6 defensive Wins Above Replacement, according to Baseball Reference, ranked him 8th among all major league players regardless of position. Kinsler had put up 50 DRS over the last three seasons, according to The Fielding Bible. The next-best total among second basemen was 29, from Colorado's DJ LeMahieu.

==== 2016: Gold Glove ====
In mid-May 2016, Kinsler became the first player in Tigers history to hit home runs from the leadoff spot in the batting order in four consecutive games. On July 3, Kinsler hit his 200th career home run, off Danny Farquhar of the Tampa Bay Rays. Kinsler became the third active major league player, and the 40th overall, with 200 home runs, 1,000 runs scored, 1,600 hits, and 200 stolen bases. On September 30, Kinsler hit his eighth lead-off home run of the season, setting a new Tigers' franchise record as he surpassed that of Curtis Granderson. The homer was also Kinsler's 28th of the year, tying Lou Whitaker's 1989 record for most by a Tiger second baseman.

For the season he was fourth in the AL in runs (117) and hit by pitch (13), 9th in power-speed number (18.7), and 10th in hits (178), as he batted .288 with 83 RBIs. His 40 career leadoff home runs at year-end were the 7th-most in MLB history.

On defense, he led AL second basemen in range factor/9 innings (5.09), and was second in putouts (303) and assists (432), and was 5th in fielding percentage (.988) and double plays (109). Following the season, Kinsler was named the Gold Glove Award winner for second base, the first of his career. He and Dustin Pedroia finished tied for the lead among AL second basemen in 2016 with 12 DRS. Kinsler's 8.5 UZR trailed only Pedroia (12.5). Through 2016, Kinsler had the best career range factor of any active second baseman in MLB.

==== 2017: Leader in Ultimate Zone Rating and Defensive Runs Saved ====
Kinsler missed some time in 2017, going on the disabled list in late May due to a left hamstring strain. In August, Kinsler was fined $10,000 by MLB for critical comments he made about umpire Ángel Hernández after Hernández ejected Kinsler from a game against Texas. He had said that Hernández was a bad umpire, and "needs to find another job." Kinsler hit 22 home runs in 139 games but posted a then career-low .236 batting average.

Kinsler was named a 2017 Gold Glove finalist at second base, along with Pedroia of the Red Sox and Brian Dozier of the Twins. Dozier won, despite Kinsler having a better Ultimate Zone Rating by a wide margin (6.1; leading AL second basemen), and being much better in Defensive Runs Saved, with 6 (leading AL second basemen) compared to Dozier's negative 4.

Kinsler's fWAR over his four seasons in Detroit ranked third among major league second basemen in that timespan, behind Jose Altuve and Dozier, and his 57 Defensive Runs Saved were 27 more than the next-highest second baseman.

=== Los Angeles Angels (2018) ===
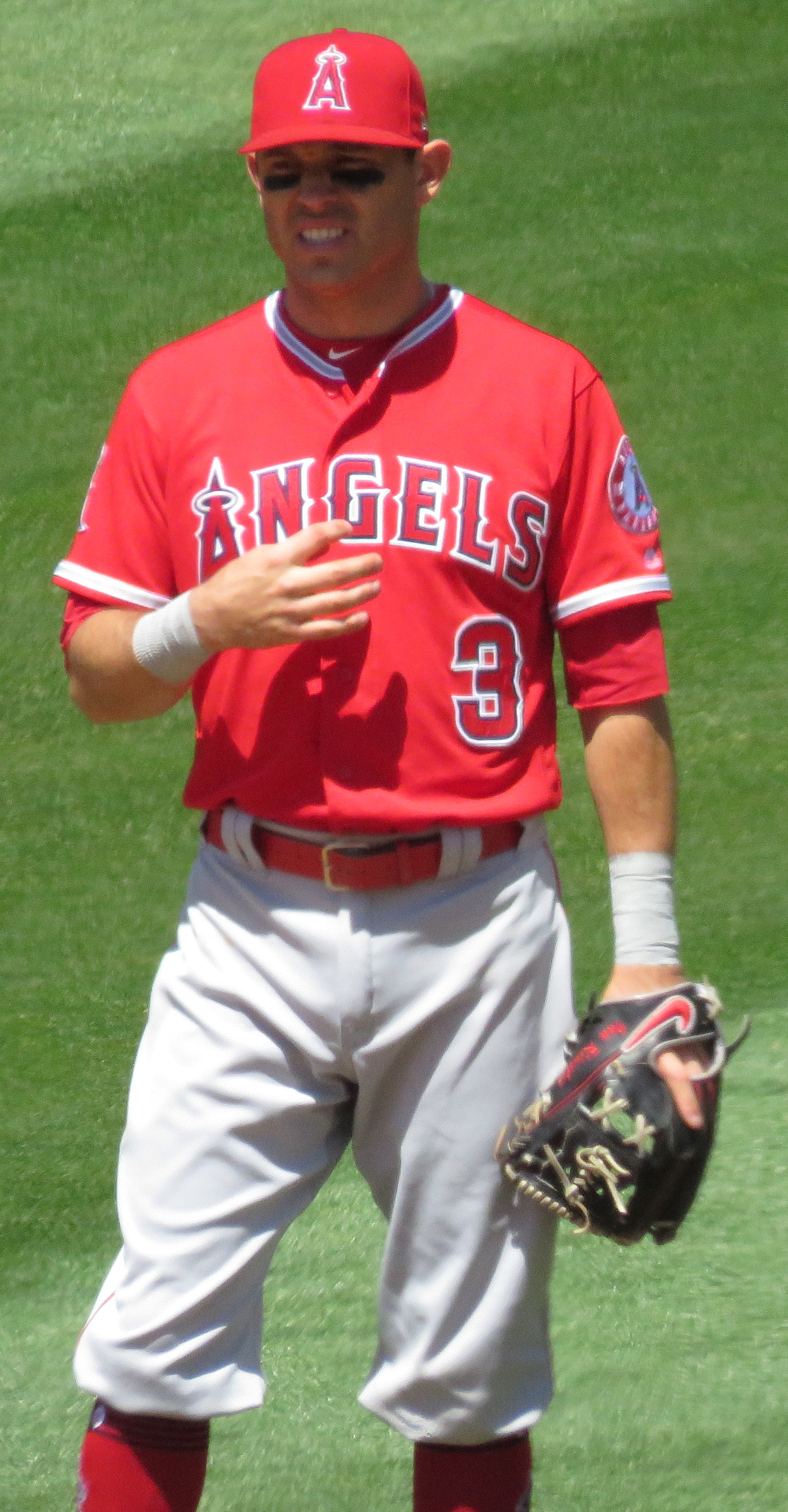
Kinsler with the Los Angeles Angels in 2018

On December 13, 2017, the Tigers traded Kinsler to the Los Angeles Angels in exchange for minor league center fielder Troy Montgomery and pitching Wilkel Hernandez.

On June 19, 2018, Kinsler hit the 48th leadoff home run of his career, which ranked fourth all-time behind Rickey Henderson, Alfonso Soriano, and Craig Biggio. In 91 games with the 2018 Angels, Kinsler batted .239 with 13 home runs, 49 runs, 32 RBIs, and 9 stolen bases.

=== Boston Red Sox (2018): Gold Glove and World Series Champion ===
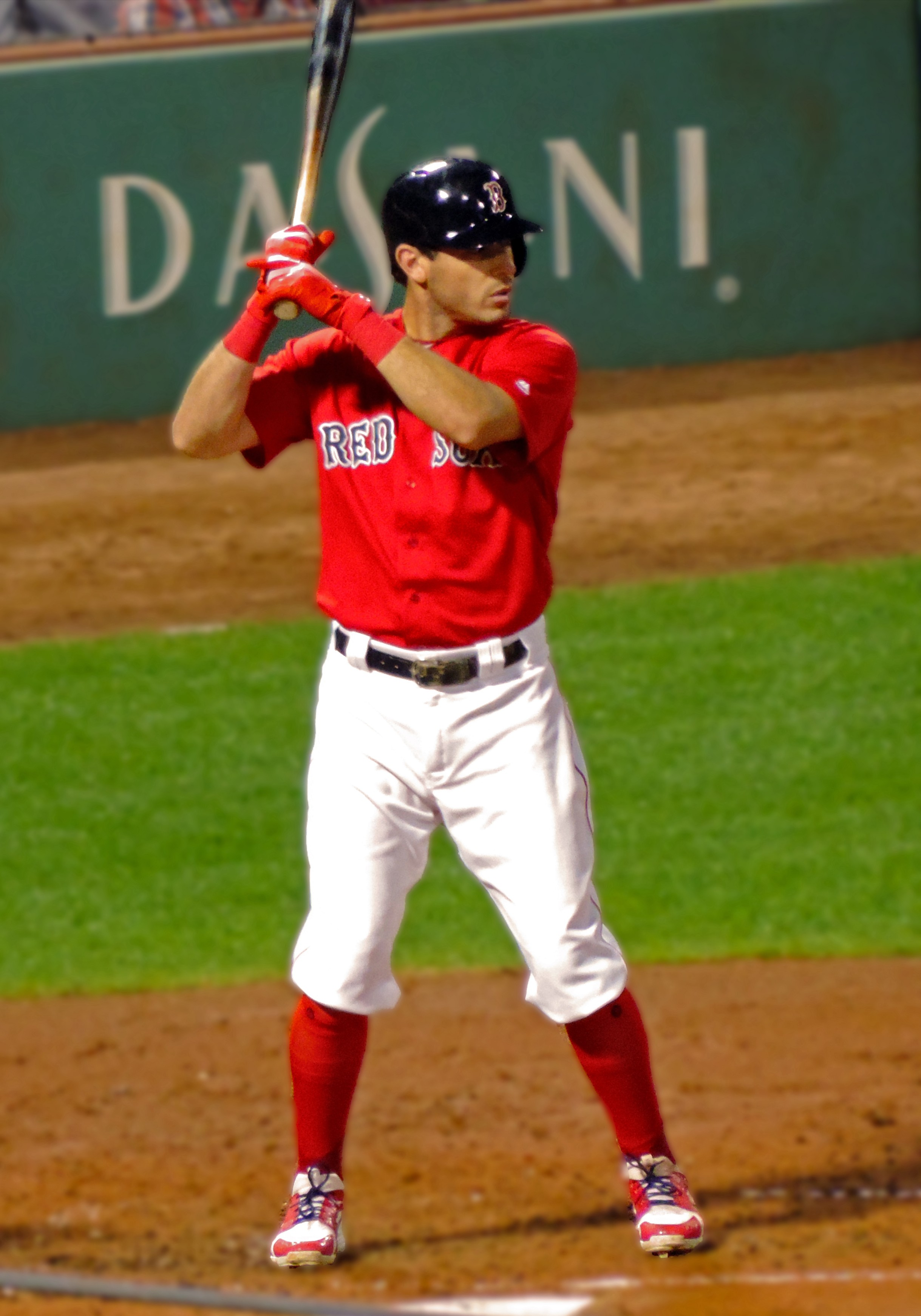
Kinsler batting for the Red Sox in 2018

On July 30, 2018, the Angels traded Kinsler and cash to the Boston Red Sox for Williams Jerez and Ty Buttrey, with the two teams splitting the remainder of Kinsler's $11 million salary.

In 37 regular season games with the Red Sox, Kinsler batted .242 with 1 home run, 16 RBIs, and 7 stolen bases in 132 at bats. Between the two teams, in 2018 he tied for first among all AL second baseman in Defensive Runs Saved (10), was second in SABR Defensive Index (8.4) and was third in zone rating (.832). Kinsler won a World Series ring in the World Series against the Los Angeles Dodgers.

Following the season, Kinsler was named the Gold Glove Award winner for second base. It was the second Gold Glove Award of his career.

He became the only player in the AL to steal more than 10 bases, as well as the only one to score more than 60 runs, in each of the prior 13 seasons since 2006.

=== San Diego Padres (2019): 1,999 career hits ===
On December 20, 2018, Kinsler signed an two-year, $8 million contract with the San Diego Padres. The team had a $3.5 million option for his 2021 season, with a $500,000 buyout.

Kinsler's season ended early, as he suffered a herniated disc in his neck. On August 12, 2019, Kinsler pitched for the first time in his major league career in the ninth inning during a blowout against Tampa Bay, pitching a scoreless inning, and then proceeded to hit a home run in the bottom half of the inning. It would be his final game ever played in the major leagues. In 2019, he batted .217/.278/.368 with 28 runs, 9 home runs, and 22 RBIs in 258 at bats, while also pitching one shutout inning. He ended the season and his career with 1,999 career hits. He announced his retirement in December.

Through 2019, Kinsler had the best career defensive range factor per game of any active second baseman in MLB (4.71). Among active players, he was third in power–speed number (249.8) and runs scored (1,243) and fifth in doubles (416).

=== Long Island Ducks ===
On July 2, 2021, Kinsler signed with the Long Island Ducks of the Atlantic League of Professional Baseball in order to prepare for the Olympics. In five appearances for the Ducks, he went 6-for-16 (.375) with two RBI and one stolen base.

== Front office career ==
=== San Diego Padres ===
On December 20, 2019, Kinsler announced the end of his playing career and his subsequent move into an adviser to baseball operations role in the Padres front office. He and the Padres settled the $4.25 million left on his contract for 2020. He ended his 14-year career one hit short of 2,000, with 257 home runs, 909 RBIs, and 243 stolen bases.

=== Texas Rangers ===
On February 6, 2023, Kinsler was hired by the Texas Rangers to serve as a special assistant to general manager Chris Young.

Kinsler served as the bench coach for the National League team in the 2024 All-Star Futures Game.

== International career ==
In 2017, Kinsler participated in the 2017 World Baseball Classic as a member of Team USA and won a gold medal in the competition. Kinsler played in seven games where he had eight hits, slashed .267/.353/.400 with a homerun in the gold-medal game against Puerto Rico.

In March 2020, Kinsler obtained Israeli citizenship and joined Team Israel. The team qualified to play baseball at the 2020 Summer Olympics in Tokyo. On June 21, 2021, in preparation for the games (which were postponed to 2021 due to the COVID-19 pandemic), Kinsler signed a contract with the Long Island Ducks of the Atlantic League of Professional Baseball. He played with the club from July 2 to 8, then joined Israel on a barnstorming tour in the northeastern United States.

Kinsler played second base for Israel at the 2020 Summer Olympics. He batted 4-for-18, hitting .222/.333/.444 with a double and a home run. Israel went 1–4, defeating Mexico but losing to the United States, the Dominican Republic, and twice to South Korea.

Kinsler managed Israel in the 2023 World Baseball Classic in Miami. Israel went 1–3, exiting after the group stage.

== Personal life ==
Kinsler identifies as Jewish. His father is Jewish, and his mother is Catholic. He was featured in the 2008 Hank Greenberg 75th Anniversary edition of Jewish Major Leaguers Baseball (MLB) cards, licensed by MLB, commemorating the Jewish major leaguers from 1871 through 2008. He joined, among others, teammate Scott Feldman, Brad Ausmus, Kevin Youkilis, Ryan Braun, Gabe Kapler, Jason Marquis, Jason Hirsh, John Grabow, Craig Breslow, and Scott Schoeneweis. He said that "Youkilis will always say something to me on the bases [referring to the fact that they are both Jewish]. 'Happy Passover,' he'll throw something at me." In 2013, he passed Shawn Green with his 163rd steal, to become the all-time career steals leader among Jewish major leaguers. Through the 2022 season, his 243 steals led the career all-time list of Jewish major leaguers (ahead of Braun), his 416 doubles placed him second behind Green, his 257 home runs and 909 RBIs both placed him fourth (behind Green in each case), his 693 walks placed him 4th behind Sid Gordon, and his 41 triples placed him 6th behind Gordon. His 31 steals in 2009 were the third-most ever in a season by a Jewish ballplayer, behind the 35 steals by Green in 1998 and the 33 steals by Braun in 2011.

Kinsler was eligible to play for Israel in the 2013 World Baseball Classic because of his father's Jewish heritage. At the time, he said: "Wow, I would be happy to play for Team Israel.... The truth is that if a proposal comes from Team USA to play for them, I will have a very difficult decision to make. Youk (Kevin Youkilis), Braun, and I could make a fantastic team. I am sure that I'll talk it over with Youk – we always laugh about things like this."

Kinsler married his high school sweetheart on November 18, 2006. They have had two children.

In 2008 Kinsler won the Rangers' Jim Sundberg Community Achievement Award, in recognition of his having devoted a great deal of his personal time to the community.

Kinsler made aliyah in March 2020 and became an Israeli citizen.

In July 2022, Kinsler was one of five torch carriers of the opening ceremony of the 2022 Maccabiah Games at Teddy Stadium in Jerusalem.

== See also ==
- List of Jewish Major League Baseball players
- List of Major League Baseball players to hit for the cycle
- List of Major League Baseball single-game hits leaders
- List of Major League Baseball career runs scored leaders

Awards and achievements
Preceded by Vladimir Guerrero and Alex Rodriguez; Evan Longoria	AL Player of the Week; April 9–15, 2007; April 13–19, 2009	Succeeded by Mark Buehrle; Mike Lowell
Preceded by Orlando Hudson	Hitting for the cycle April 15, 2009	Succeeded by Jason Kubel
