= Sam Narron (pitcher) =

American baseball player & coach

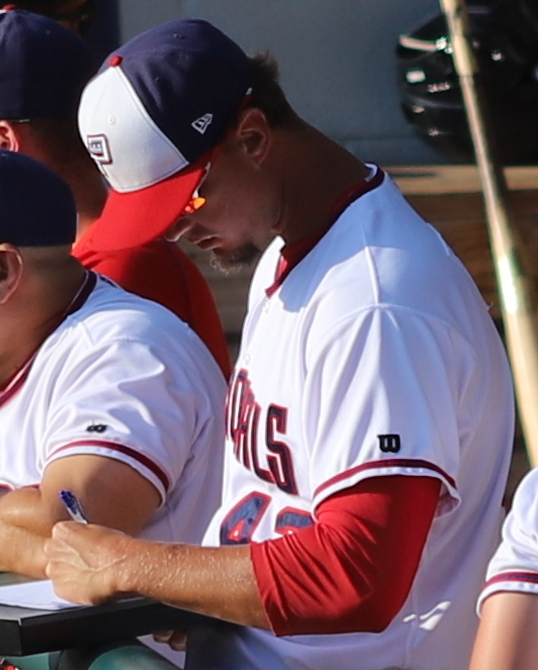
- Narron with the Potomac Nationals in 2018
- Pitcher
- Born: July 12, 1981 (age 45); Goldsboro, North Carolina, U.S.
- Batted: Left Threw: Left

MLB debut
- July 30, 2004, for the Texas Rangers

Last MLB appearance
- July 30, 2004, for the Texas Rangers

MLB statistics
- Win–loss: 0–0
- Earned run average: 13.50
- Strikeouts: 1
- Stats at Baseball Reference

Teams
- Texas Rangers (2004)

Samuel Franklin Narron (born July 12, 1981) is an American former professional baseball pitcher. He pitched in one game in Major League Baseball (MLB) for the Texas Rangers in the 2004 season. He was selected by the Texas Rangers in the 15th round of the 2002 MLB draft. On April 28, 2008, Narron hit a home run for the Huntsville Stars, the first home run on the season for a pitcher. He is the grandson of former major league catcher and coach Sam Narron and cousin of catcher and manager Jerry Narron.

== College career ==
Narron attended East Carolina University, where he played college baseball for the Pirates. He was named to the All-Tournament Team in the 2002 Conference USA Tournament, which East Carolina won.

== Professional career ==
Narron was drafted by the Texas Rangers in the 15th round of the 2002 amateur draft. He began that season with their Rookie League affiliate, the Pulaski Rangers. In 2003, he was promoted to the Class A-Advanced Stockton Ports. The following season, he advanced to the Double-A Frisco RoughRiders, where he was named to the Texas League mid-season All-Star team, and the Triple-A Oklahoma RedHawks. Narron was also called up to the major league Rangers for one game.

On September 24, 2004, Narron was claimed off waivers by the Milwaukee Brewers. He later underwent Tommy John surgery and missed the entire 2005 season. Narron returned to the game in 2006, playing for Milwaukee's Class A-Advanced Brevard County Manatees. In 2007, he played with the Double-A Huntsville Stars. After starting 2008 in Huntsville, he was promoted to the Triple-A Nashville Sounds on May 16, 2008. He spent the remainder of 2008 and the entire 2009 season with Nashville before becoming a minor league free agent after the season.

On January 14, 2010, Narron signed a minor league contract with the Detroit Tigers he received an invite to spring training. He was later released and signed a minor league contract with the Brewers. He filed for free agency after the 2010 season, but later signed a new minor league contract with Milwaukee for 2011.

=== Post-playing career ===
He retired from playing following the 2011 season and was a pitching coach for the Hagerstown Suns, a minor league baseball team.

Narron was named as the Pitching coach for the Potomac Nationals for the 2018 season.

In 2026, Narron was named as the assistant pitching coach of the Rochester Red Wings the Triple-A affiliate of the Washington Nationals.
