= Sam Narron (catcher) =

American baseball player and coach (1913–1996)

- Catcher
- Born: August 25, 1913; Middlesex, North Carolina, U.S.
- Died: December 31, 1996 (aged 83); Raleigh, North Carolina, U.S.
- Batted: Right Threw: Right

MLB debut
- September 15, 1935, for the St. Louis Cardinals

Last MLB appearance
- September 30, 1943, for the St. Louis Cardinals

MLB statistics
- Batting average: .286
- Home runs: 0
- Runs batted in: 1
- Stats at Baseball Reference

Teams
- St. Louis Cardinals (1935; 1942–1943)

Career highlights and awards
- 2× World Series champion (1942, 1960)

Samuel Woody Narron (August 25, 1913 – December 31, 1996) was an American Major League Baseball player and coach. Born in Middlesex, North Carolina, Narron batted and threw right-handed; he stood 5 ft 10 in (1.78 m) (178 cm) tall and weighed 180 pounds (81.7 kg). He was the uncle of Major League catcher, coach and manager Jerry Narron and MLB coach Johnny Narron, and the grandfather of pitcher Sam Narron.

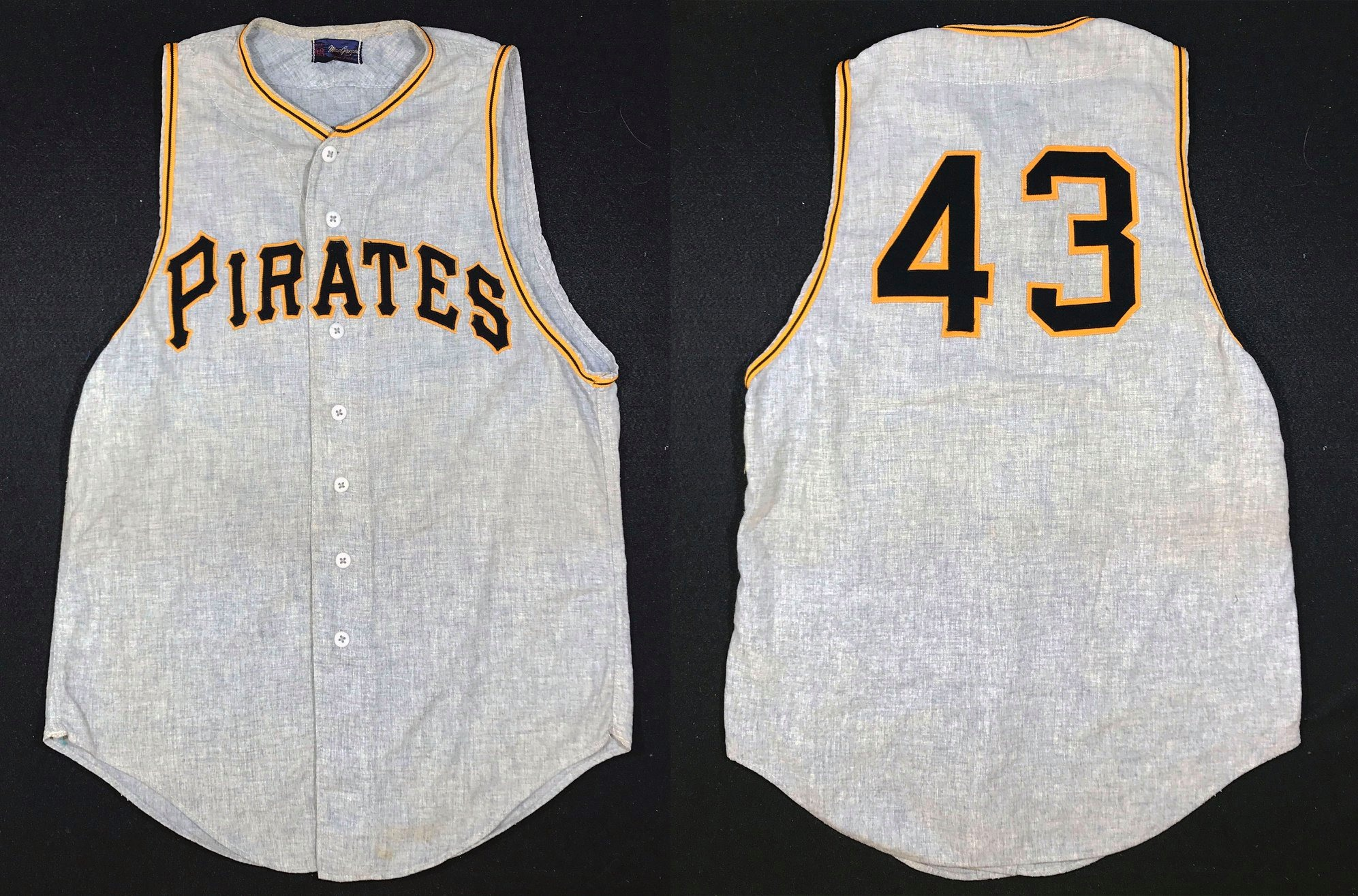
Pittsburgh Pirates 1960 #43 Sam Narron game worn road jersey

Narron spent almost his entire playing career in minor league baseball. Originally an outfielder, he led the Class D Georgia–Florida League in batting average with a .349 mark in 1936. The following year, he became a catcher and twice batted over .300 for the Rochester Red Wings of the AA International League.

In the Major Leagues, Narron appeared in parts of three seasons (1935, 1942 and 1943) with the St. Louis Cardinals, playing in 24 games and hitting .286 with one run batted in in just 28 at bats.

A protégé of longtime MLB executive Branch Rickey, Narron continued in baseball after his playing career ended in 1948. He was the bullpen catcher for the Brooklyn Dodgers during 1949 and 1950, the last two years of Rickey's tenure there, then followed him to the Pittsburgh Pirates as the Buccos' Major League bullpen coach from 1951 through 1964.

He was inducted in the Kinston Professional Baseball Hall of Fame in 1988. Sam Narron died in Raleigh, North Carolina, at the age of 83.

Sporting positions
Preceded by N/A	Pittsburgh Pirates bullpen coach 1951–1964	Succeeded by Hal Smith
