= 2010 Kansas City Royals season =

2010 Kansas City Royals
- League: American League
- Division: Central
- Ballpark: Kauffman Stadium
- City: Kansas City, Missouri
- Record: 67–95 (.414)
- Divisional place: 5th
- Owners: David Glass
- General managers: Dayton Moore
- Managers: Trey Hillman; Ned Yost
- Television: Fox Sports Kansas City (Ryan Lefebvre, Paul Splittorff, Frank White)
- Radio: KCSP 610 AM (Denny Matthews, Bob Davis, Steve Stewart)

The Kansas City Royals' season of 2010 was the 42nd for the Royals franchise. It was also the 25th anniversary of their first World Series championship (1985).

The Royals' payroll as the 2010 season opened was $70 million (21st in the major leagues). Royals batters struck out 905 times during the season, the fewest of any team in a season in the 2010s.

== Regular season ==
Manager Trey Hillman and third base coach Dave Owen (baseball) were dismissed after the game on May 13, 2010, and replaced with Ned Yost as manager and Rusty Kuntz as first base coach with Eddie Rodriguez shifting from first base coach to third base coach.

=== Season standings ===
==== American League Central ====
AL Central
Team	W	L	Pct.	GB	Home	Road
Minnesota Twins	94	68	.580	—	53‍–‍28	41‍–‍40
Chicago White Sox	88	74	.543	6	45‍–‍36	43‍–‍38
Detroit Tigers	81	81	.500	13	52‍–‍29	29‍–‍52
Cleveland Indians	69	93	.426	25	38‍–‍43	31‍–‍50
Kansas City Royals	67	95	.414	27	38‍–‍43	29‍–‍52

==== American League Wild Card ====
Division winners
Team	W	L	Pct.
Tampa Bay Rays	96	66	.593
Minnesota Twins	94	68	.580
Texas Rangers	90	72	.556

Wild Card team (Top team qualifies for postseason)
Team	W	L	Pct.	GB
New York Yankees	95	67	.586	—
Boston Red Sox	89	73	.549	6
Chicago White Sox	88	74	.543	7
Toronto Blue Jays	85	77	.525	10
Detroit Tigers	81	81	.500	14
Oakland Athletics	81	81	.500	14
Los Angeles Angels of Anaheim	80	82	.494	15
Cleveland Indians	69	93	.426	26
Kansas City Royals	67	95	.414	28
Baltimore Orioles	66	96	.407	29
Seattle Mariners	61	101	.377	34

==== Record vs. opponents ====
2010 American League record Source: MLB Standings Grid – 2010
Team	BAL	BOS	CWS	CLE	DET	KC	LAA	MIN	NYY	OAK	SEA	TB	TEX	TOR	NL
Baltimore	–	9–9	4–3	3–3	5–5	2–4	6–0	3–5	5–13	3–7	3–6	7–11	6–4	3–15	7–11
Boston	9–9	–	1–6	4–4	3–3	4–3	9–1	3–2	9–9	4–5	7–3	7–11	4–6	12–6	13–5
Chicago	3–4	6–1	–	9–9	8–10	10–8	7–2	5–13	2–4	4–5	9–1	3–4	4–5	3–5	15–3
Cleveland	3–3	4–4	9–9	–	9–9	10–8	5–4	6–12	2–6	3–6	3–4	2–7	2–4	6–4	5–13
Detroit	5–5	3–3	10–8	9–9	–	10–8	6–4	9–9	4–4	3–3	3–5	1–6	3–6	4–4	11–7
Kansas City	4–2	3-4	9–10	8–10	8–10	–	3-7	5–13	3–5	3–6	5–4	4–4	2–7	3–3	8–10
Los Angeles	0–6	1–9	2–7	4–5	4–6	7–3	–	2–5	4–4	11–8	15–4	4–5	9–10	6–3	11–7
Minnesota	5–3	2–3	13–5	12–6	9–9	13–5	5–2	–	2–4	6–3	6-4	3–5	7–3	3–6	8–10
New York	13–5	9–9	4–2	6-2	4–4	5–3	4–4	4–2	–	9–1	6–4	8–10	4–4	8–10	11–7
Oakland	7–3	5–4	5–4	6–3	3–3	6–3	8–11	3–6	1–9	–	13–6	4–5	9–10	3–4	8–10
Seattle	6–3	3–7	1–9	4–3	5–3	4–5	4–15	4–6	4–6	6–13	–	2–7	7–12	2–3	9–9
Tampa Bay	11–7	11–7	4–3	7–2	6–1	4–4	5–4	5–3	10–8	5–4	7–2	–	4–2	10–8	7–11
Texas	4–6	6–4	5–4	4–2	6–3	7–2	10-9	3-7	4-4	10-9	12–7	2–4	–	3–7	14–4
Toronto	15–3	6–12	5–3	4–6	4–4	3–3	3–6	6–3	10–8	4–3	3–2	8–10	7–3	–	7–11

- Source: MLB Standings Grid – 2010

=== Game log ===
Legend
Royals Win	Royals Loss	Game postponed

2010 Game Log
April (9–14)

#	Date	Opponent	Score	Win	Loss	Save	Attendance	Record
1	April 5	Tigers	8–4	Zumaya (1–0)	Tejeda (0–1)		40,052	0–1
2	April 7	Tigers	3–2 (11)	Farnsworth (1–0)	Valverde (0–1)		10,574	1–1
3	April 8	Tigers	7–3	Bonine (1–0)	Mendoza (0–1)		10,909	1–2
4	April 9	Red Sox	4–3	Parrish (1–0)	Bard (0–1)	Soria (1)	21,091	2–2
5	April 10	Red Sox	8–3	Beckett (1–0)	Greinke (0–1)		37,505	2–3
6	April 11	Red Sox	8–6	Buchholz (1–0)	Meche (0–1)	Papelbon (2)	19,240	2–4
7	April 12	@ Tigers	10–5	Hochevar (1–0)	Scherzer (0–1)		17,058	3–4
8	April 13	@ Tigers	6–5	Zumaya (2–0)	Hughes (0–1)	Valverde (2)	18,414	3–5
9	April 14	@ Tigers	7–3	Davies (1–0)	Perry (0–1)	Soria (2)	19,262	4–5
10	April 16	@ Twins	10–3	Baker (2–1)	Greinke (0–2)		38,532	4–6
11	April 17	@ Twins	6–5	Duensing (2–0)	Parrish (1–1)	Rauch (6)	38,564	4–7
12	April 18	@ Twins	10–5	Hochevar (2–0)	Pavano (2–1)	Soria (3)	38,544	5–7
13	April 19	@ Blue Jays	8–1	Morrow (1–1)	Bannister (0–1)		10,314	5–8
14	April 20	@ Blue Jays	4–3	Camp (1–0)	Davies (0–2)	Gregg (4)	10,565	5–9
15	April 21	@ Blue Jays	4–3 (10)	Tejeda (1–1)	Downs (0–1)	Soria (4)	15,577	6–9
16	April 23	Twins	8–3	Pavano (3–1)	Meche (0–2)		16,605	6–10
17	April 24	Twins	9–7 (12)	Rauch (1–0)	Tejeda (1–2)		26,649	6–11
18	April 25	Twins	4–3	Bannister (1–1)	Slowey (2–2)	Soria (5)	15,601	7–11
19	April 26	Mariners	3–1	Davies (2–1)	Hernández (2–1)	Chen (1)	11,391	8–11
20	April 27	Mariners	3–2	Kelley (1–0)	Rupe (0–1)	Aardsma (7)	14,969	8–12
21	April 28	Mariners	6–5	League (3–1)	Thompson (0–1)	Aardsma (8)	13,206	8–13
22	April 29	@ Rays	11–1	Garza (4–1)	Hochevar (2–1)		12,766	8–14
23	April 30	@ Rays	3–2	Rupe (1–1)	Choate (0–2)	Soria (6)	25,195	9–14

May (12–17)

#	Date	Opponent	Score	Win	Loss	Save	Attendance	Record
24	May 1	@ Rays	4–2 (11)	Tejada (2–2)	Cormier (2–1)	Soria (7)	34,813	10–14
25	May 2	@ Rays	1–0	Davis (3–1)	Greinke (0–3)	Soriano (6)	19,757	10–15
26	May 3	@ White Sox	5–1	Peavy (1–2)	Meche (0–3)		21,208	10–16
27	May 4	@ White Sox	7–2	Hochevar (3–1)	Floyd (1–3)		17,157	11–16
28	May 5	@ White Sox	9–2	García (1–2)	Bannister (1–2)		21,255	11–17
29	May 6	@ Rangers	13–12	Francisco (4–3)	Soria (0–1)	Feliz (7)	15,132	11–18
30	May 7	@ Rangers	4–1	Wilson (3–1)	Greinke (0–4)		29,065	11–19
31	May 8	@ Rangers	3–2	Ray (1–0)	Meche (0–4)	Feliz (8)	36,349	11–20
32	May 9	@ Rangers	6–4	Mathis (1–0)	Thompson (0–2)	Feliz (9)	25,476	11–21
33	May 11	Indians	8–2	Westbrook (1–2)	Bannister (1–2)		15,930	11–22
34	May 12	Indians	4–0	Carmona (4–1)	Davies (2–2)		11,803	11–23
35	May 13	Indians	6–4	Greinke (1–4)	Huff (1–5)	Soria (8)	28,361	12–23
36	May 14	White Sox	6–1	Hughes (1–1)	Buehrle (2–5)		27,816	13–23
37	May 15	White Sox	5–4	Peavy (3–2)	Hochevar (3–2)	Thornton (1)	22,192	13–24
38	May 16	White Sox	5–3	Bannister (2–3)	Floyd (1–4)	Soria (9)	13,922	14–24
39	May 17	@ Orioles	4–3	Davies (3–2)	Bergesen (3–3)	Soria (10)	9,299	15–24
40	May 18	@ Orioles	4–3 (10)	Simón (1–1)	Bullington (0–1)		9,715	15–25
41	May 19	@ Indians	8–4	Chen (1–0)	Wood (0–2)		10,916	16–25
42	May 20	@ Indians	9–3	Hochevar (4–2)	Talbot (5–3)		13,953	17–25
43	May 21	Rockies	9–2	Bannister (3–3)	Hammel (1–3)		24,807	18–25
44	May 22	Rockies	3–0	Francis (1–0)	Davies (3–3)	Corpas (3)	20,907	18–26
45	May 23	Rockies	11–7	Rogers (1–2)	Greinke (1–5)		21,867	18–27
46	May 25	Rangers	8–7	O'Day (2–2)	Thompson (0–3)	Feliz (13)	12,796	18–28
47	May 26	Rangers	5–2	Hochevar (5–2)	Feldman (2–5)	Soria (11)	14,722	19–28
48	May 27	@ Red Sox	4–3	Bannister (4–3)	Matsuzaka (3–2)	Soria (12)	37,940	20–28
49	May 28	@ Red Sox	12–5	Davies (4–3)	Wakefield (1–3)		37,945	21–28
50	May 29	@ Red Sox	1–0	Buchholz (7–3)	Greinke (1–6)	Papelbon (12)	37,956	21–29
51	May 30	@ Red Sox	8–1	Lester (6–2)	Thompson (0–4)		37,581	21–30
52	May 31	Angels	7–1	Santana (5–3)	Hochevar (5–3)		24,649	21–31

June (13–14)

#	Date	Opponent	Score	Win	Loss	Save	Attendance	Record
53	June 1	Angels	6–3	Bannister (5–3)	Piñeiro (3–6)	Soria (13)	15,142	22–31
54	June 2	Angels	7–2	Kazmir (4–5)	Davies (4–4)		12,718	22–32
55	June 3	Angels	5–4	Weaver (5–2)	Greinke (1–7)	Fuentes (7)	13,621	22–33
56	June 4	Tigers	7–3	Chen (2–0)	Scherzer (2–5)		21,930	23–33
57	June 5	Tigers	4–2	Verlander (6–4)	Hochevar (5–4)	Valverde (12)	24,383	23–34
58	June 6	Tigers	7–2	Bannister (6–3)	Bonderman (2–4)		22,240	24–34
59	June 8	@ Twins	7–3	Slowey (7–3)	Greinke (1–8)	Guerrier (1)	38,970	24–35
60	June 9	@ Twins	6–2	Pavano (6–6)	Davies (4–5)		40,323	24–36
61	June 10	@ Twins	9–8	Chen (3–0)	Baker (5–5)	Soria (14)	39,022	25–36
62	June 11	@ Reds	6–5 (11)	Marté (1–0)	Owings (3–2)	Soria (15)	25,847	26–36
63	June 12	@ Reds	11–5	Cueto (6–1)	Bannister (6–4)		34,240	26–37
64	June 13	@ Reds	7–3	Greinke (2–8)	LeCure (1–3)		23,747	27–37
65	June 15	Astros	15–7	Texeira (1–1)	Paulino (1–8)		24,862	28–37
66	June 16	Astros	4–2	Oswalt (5–8)	Chen (3–1)	Lindstrom (15)	17,675	28–38
67	June 17	Astros	5–2	Marté (2–0)	Myers (4–5)	Soria (16)	16,255	29–38
68	June 18	@ Braves	6–4	Lowe (9–5)	Bannister (6–5)	Wagner (13)	29,808	29–39
69	June 19	@ Braves	5–4	Wagner (5–0)	Tejeda (2–3)		39,109	29–40
70	June 20	@ Braves	8–5	Kimbrel (2–0)	Wood (0–1)	Wagner (14)	30,072	29–41
71	June 21	@ Nationals	2–1	Hernández (6–4)	Chen (3–2)	Capps (21)	13,592	29–42
72	June 22	@ Nationals	4–3	Atilano (6–4)	Lerew (0–1)	Capps (22)	21,168	29–43
73	June 23	@ Nationals	1–0	Bannister (7–5)	Strasburg (2–1)	Soria (17)	31,913	30–43
74	June 25	Cardinals	4–2	Greinke (3–8)	Suppan (0–3)	Soria (18)	38,916	31–43
75	June 26	Cardinals	5–3	Hawksworth (2–4)	Davies (4–6)	Franklin (15)	38,457	31–44
76	June 27	Cardinals	10–3	Chen (4–2)	García (7–4)		32,938	32–44
77	June 28	White Sox	3–1	Lerew (1–1)	Buehrle (6–7)	Soria (19)	15,056	33–44
78	June 29	White Sox	4–3	Floyd (3–7)	Bannister (7–6)	Putz (2)	19,364	33–45
79	June 30	White Sox	7–6	Greinke (4–8)	Peavy (7–6)	Soria (20)	18,335	34–45

July (10–15)

#	Date	Opponent	Score	Win	Loss	Save	Attendance	Record
80	July 2	@ Angels	2–1 (10)	Tejeda (3–3)	Shields (0–3)	Soria (21)	40,005	35–45
81	July 3	@ Angels	4–2	Chen (5–2)	Santana (8–6)	Soria (22)	39,112	36–45
82	July 4	@ Angels	11–0	Piñeiro (9–6)	Lerew (1–2)		42,116	36–46
83	July 5	@ Mariners	6–4 (10)	Farnsworth (2–0)	Cordero (0–1)	Soria (23)	22,617	37–46
84	July 6	@ Mariners	3–2	Greinke (5–8)	Rowland-Smith (1–8)	Soria (24)	17,555	38–46
85	July 7	@ Mariners	7–3	Marté (3–0)	League (5–6)	Soria (25)	16,954	39–46
86	July 9	@ White Sox	8–2	Buehrle (8–7)	Chen (5–3)		25,572	39–47
87	July 10	@ White Sox	5–1	Floyd (5–7)	Bannister (7–7)		32,339	39–48
88	July 11	@ White Sox	15–5	Peña (3–1)	Lerew (1–3)		29,040	39–49
All-Star Break: National League defeats American League 3–1.
89	July 16	Athletics	5–1	Gonzalez (8–6)	Greinke (5–9)		37,312	39–50
90	July 17	Athletics	6–5	Breslow (4–2)	Soria (0–2)	Bailey (19)	26,634	39–51
91	July 18	Athletics	9–6	Mazzaro (5–2)	Bannister (7–8)	Bailey (20)	18,702	39–52
92	July 19	Blue Jays	5–4 (10)	Farnsworth (3–0)	Gregg (0–4)		12,968	40–52
93	July 20	Blue Jays	13–1	Litsch (1–4)	Lerew (1–4)		18,865	40–53
94	July 21	Blue Jays	5–2	Greinke (6–9)	Rzepczynski (0–1)	Soria (26)	15,285	41–53
95	July 22	@ Yankees	10–4	Sabathia (13–3)	Chen (5–4)		47,484	41–54
96	July 23	@ Yankees	7–1	Burnett (8–8)	Bannister (7–9)		46,801	41–55
97	July 24	@ Yankees	7–4	Davies (5–6)	Mitre (0–2)	Soria (27)	48,138	42–55
98	July 25	@ Yankees	12–6	Hughes (12–3)	O'Sullivan (1–1)		47,890	42–56
99	July 26	Twins	19–1	Liriano (9–7)	Greinke (6–10)		19,306	42–57
100	July 27	Twins	11–2	Pavano (13–6)	Chen (5–5)		16,749	42–58
101	July 28	Twins	6–4	Duensing (4–1)	Bannister (7–10)	Rauch (21)	15,484	42–59
102	July 29	Orioles	6–5 (11)	Hernandez (5–7)	Wood (0–2)	Simón (15)	17,220	42–60
103	July 30	Orioles	7–5	Wood (1–2)	Simón (2–2)		21,537	43–60
104	July 31	Orioles	4–3	Greinke (7–10)	Hernandez (5–8)	Soria (28)	25,055	44–60

August (12–16)

#	Date	Opponent	Score	Win	Loss	Save	Attendance	Record
105	August 1	Orioles	5–4	Chen (6–5)	Millwood (2–11)	Soria (29)	14,662	45–60
106	August 2	@ Athletics	6–0	Cahill (11–4)	Bannister (7–11)		10,047	45–61
107	August 3	@ Athletics	3–2	Chavez (4–2)	Breslow (4–3)	Soria (30)	10,670	46–61
108	August 4	@ Athletics	4–3	Anderson (3–2)	O'Sullivan (1–2)	Wuertz (4)	22,325	46–62
109	August 6	@ Mariners	7–1	French (1–2)	Greinke (7–11)		20,411	46–63
110	August 7	@ Mariners	2–1	Chen (7–5)	Pauley (0–4)	Soria (31)	24,520	47–63
111	August 8	@ Mariners	3–2	Vargas (8–5)	Davies (5–7)	Aardsma (20)	24,078	47–64
112	August 9	@ Angels	6–4	Santana (11–8)	O'Sullivan (1–3)	Fuentes (22)	40,011	47–65
113	August 10	@ Angels	3–1	Haren (1–2)	Bullington (0–2)	Fuentes (23)	43,512	47–66
114	August 11	@ Angels	2–1 (10)	Fuentes (4–1)	Chavez (4–3)		39,093	47–67
115	August 12	Yankees	4–3	Sabathia (15–5)	Chen (7–6)	Robertson (1)	23,337	47–68
116	August 13	Yankees	4–3	Davies (6–7)	Moseley (2–2)	Soria (32)	30,680	48–68
117	August 14	Yankees	8–3	Hughes (14–5)	O'Sullivan (1–4)		34,206	48–69
118	August 15	Yankees	1–0	Bullington (1–2)	Burnett (9–10)	Soria (33)	26,012	49–69
119	August 17	Indians	2–1	Greinke (8–11)	Gómez (3–1)	Soria (34)	13,258	50–69
120	August 18	Indians	9–7	Chen (8–6)	Carmona (11–11)	Soria (35)	12,864	51–69
121	August 19	Indians	7–3	Pérez (4–0)	Wood (1–3)	Perez (15)	9,732	51–70
	August 20	White Sox	Postponed (rain); rescheduled for August 21					
122	August 21 (Game 1)	White Sox	6–5 (11)	Chavez (5–3)	Sale (0–1)		N/A	52–70
123	August 21 (Game 2)	White Sox	7–6 (10)	Putz (6–5)	Holland (0–1)		25,543	52–71
124	August 22	White Sox	3–2 (10)	O'Sullivan (2–4)	Linebrink (1–1)		18,877	53–71
125	August 23	@ Tigers	12–3	Bonderman (7–9)	Chen (8–7)		30,552	53–72
126	August 24	@ Tigers	9–1	Porcello (6–11)	Davies (6–8)		29,043	53–73
127	August 25	@ Tigers	4–3 (12)	Humber (1–0)	Fígaro (0–1)	Soria (36)	31,231	54–73
128	August 27	@ Indians	15–4	Tomlin (2–3)	Bullington (1–3)		17,631	54–74
129	August 28	@ Indians	4–3 (10)	Perez (2–2)	Chavez (5–4)		16,372	54–75
130	August 29	@ Indians	6–2	Chen (9–7)	Carmona (11–13)		19,725	55–75
131	August 30	Rangers	3–0	Wilson (14–5)	Davies (6–9)	Feliz (33)	15,881	55–76
132	August 31	Rangers	10–9	Soria (1–2)	Oliver (1–2)		10,295	56–76

September/October (11–19)

#	Date	Opponent	Score	Win	Loss	Save	Attendance	Record
133	September 1	Rangers	4–3	Hunter (12–2)	Bullington (1–4)	Feliz (34)	10,811	56–77
134	September 3	Tigers	9–5 (11)	Perry (3–5)	Chavez (5–5)		17,835	56–78
135	September 4	Tigers	6–4	Porcello (8–11)	Hughes (1–2)	Valverde (25)	21,483	56–79
136	September 5	Tigers	2–1	Davies (7–9)	Thomas (5–2)	Soria (37)	19,061	57–79
137	September 6	@ Twins	5–4	Manship (2–0)	O'Sullivan (2–5)	Capps (10)	40,228	57–80
138	September 7	@ Twins	10–3	Liriano (13–7)	Bannister (7–12)		38,816	57–81
139	September 8	@ Twins	4–3	Duensing (8–2)	Greinke (8–12)	Capps (11)	39,376	57–82
140	September 10	@ White Sox	4–3	Putz (7–5)	Tejeda (3–4)	Sale (2)	27,009	57–83
141	September 11	@ White Sox	8–2	Davies (8–9)	Jackson (3–1)		26,389	58–83
142	September 12	@ White Sox	12–6	Santos (2–0)	Humber (1–1)		23,756	58–84
143	September 13	Athletics	3–1	Cramer (1–0)	Hochevar (5–5)	Bailey (24)	20,695	58–85
144	September 14	Athletics	11–3	Greinke (9–12)	Gonzalez (14–9)		12,852	59–85
145	September 15	Athletics	6–3	Chen (10–7)	Cahill (16–7)	Soria (38)	11,087	60–85
146	September 17	Indians	11–4	Carrasco (1–0)	Davies (8–10)		21,168	60–86
147	September 18	Indians	6–4	Smith (2–2)	O'Sullivan (2–6)	Perez (21)	18,112	60–87
148	September 19	Indians	6–4	Hochevar (6–5)	Tomlin (4–4)	Soria (39)	17,803	61–87
149	September 20	@ Tigers	7–5	Thomas (6–2)	Greinke (9–13)	Coke (2)	24,382	61–88
150	September 21	@ Tigers	9–6	Chen (11–7)	Galarraga (4–7)	Soria (40)	26,178	62–88
151	September 22	@ Tigers	4–2	Scherzer (12–10)	Davies (8–11)		24,678	62–89
152	September 23	@ Indians	4–2	O'Sullivan (3–6)	Talbot (9–13)	Soria (41)	16,625	63–89
153	September 24	@ Indians	7–3	Tomlin (5–4)	Hochevar (6–6)		25,100	63–90
154	September 25	@ Indians	7–1	Gómez (4–5)	Greinke (9–14)		19,746	63–91
155	September 26	@ Indians	5–3	Pérez (6–1)	Tejeda (3–5)	Pestano (1)	18,813	63–92
156	September 27	Twins	10–8	Humber (2–1)	Manship (2–1)	Soria (42)	19,307	64–92
157	September 28	Twins	10–1	O'Sullivan (4–6)	Blackburn (10–11)		18,487	65–92
158	September 29	Twins	4–2	Guerrier (5–7)	Meche (0–5)	Capps (16)	18,340	65–93
159	September 30	Rays	3–2	Greinke (10–14)	Garza (15–10)	Soria (43)	21,563	66–93
160	October 1	Rays	7–0	Chen (12–7)	Shields (13–15)		23,374	67–93
161	October 2	Rays	4–0	Qualls (3–4)	Davies (8–12)		32,484	67–94
162	October 3	Rays	3–2 (12)	Niemann (12–8)	Hughes (1–3)	Soriano (45)	20,936	67–95

=== Roster ===
2010 Kansas City Royals
Roster
Pitchers: 19 Brian Bannister; 41 Bryan Bullington; 57 Jesse Chavez; 52 Bruce Chen; 56 Román Colón; 37 Juan Cruz; 34 Kyle Davies; 40 Kyle Farnsworth; 23 Zack Greinke; 44 Luke Hochevar; 56 Greg Holland; 31 Dusty Hughes; 59 Philip Humber; 54 Anthony Lerew; 47 Víctor Marté; 55 Gil Meche; 39 Luis Mendoza; 37 Sean O'Sullivan; 67 John Parrish; 65 Josh Rupe; 48 Joakim Soria; 51 Robinson Tejeda; 53 Kanekoa Texeira; 57 Brad Thompson; 38 Blake Wood	Catchers: 18 Jason Kendall; 22 Lucas May; 27 Brayan Peña; Infielders: 30 Mike Avilés; 3 Yuniesky Betancourt; 46 Wilson Betemit; 16 Billy Butler; 13 Alberto Callaspo; 11 Josh Fields; 17 Chris Getz; 25 Kila Ka'aihue; Outfielders: 24 Rick Ankiel; 7 Gregor Blanco; 8 Willie Bloomquist; 9 David DeJesus; 1 Jarrod Dyson; 4 Alex Gordon; 6 José Guillén; 12 Mitch Maier; 26 Jai Miller; 22 Scott Podsednik	Manager: 88 Trey Hillman; 2 Ned Yost; Coaches: 58 Steve Foster (bullpen); 50 John Gibbons (bench); 15 Rusty Kuntz (first base); 14 Eddie Rodríguez (first base)(third base); 33 Bob McClure (pitching); 7 Dave Owen (third base); 36 Kevin Seitzer (hitting)

== Player stats ==
=== Batting ===
Note: G = Games played; AB = At bats; R = Runs scored; H = Hits; 2B = Doubles; 3B = Triples; HR = Home runs; RBI = Runs batted in; AVG = Batting average; SB = Stolen bases

Player	G	AB	R	H	2B	3B	HR	RBI	AVG	SB
(C) Jason Kendall	118	434	39	111	18	0	0	37	.256	12
(1B) Billy Butler	158	595	77	189	45	0	15	78	.318	0
(2B) Mike Avilés	110	424	63	129	16	3	8	32	.304	14
(SS) Yuniesky Betancourt	151	556	60	144	29	2	16	78	.259	2
(3B) Alberto Callaspo	88	349	40	96	19	2	8	43	.275	3
(LF) Scott Podsednik	95	390	46	121	19	2	5	44	.310	30
(CF) Mitch Maier	117	373	41	98	15	6	5	39	.263	3
(RF) David DeJesus	91	352	46	112	23	3	5	37	.318	3
(DH) José Guillén	106	396	46	101	17	2	16	62	.255	1
(3B) Wilson Betemit	84	276	36	82	20	0	13	43	.297	0
(LF) Alex Gordon	74	242	34	52	10	0	8	20	.215	1
(2B) Chris Getz	72	224	23	53	9	0	0	18	.237	15
(1B) Kila Ka'aihue	52	180	22	39	6	1	8	25	.217	0
(CF) Gregor Blanco	49	179	22	49	8	3	1	11	.274	10
(UT) Willie Bloomquist	72	170	31	45	10	1	3	17	.265	8
(C) Brayan Peña	60	158	11	40	10	0	1	19	.253	2
(CF) Rick Ankiel	27	92	14	24	7	0	4	15	.261	1
(CF) Jarrod Dyson	18	57	11	12	4	2	1	5	.211	9
(RF) Jai Miller	20	55	5	13	3	0	1	4	.236	1
(3B) Josh Fields	13	49	5	15	0	0	3	6	.306	0
(C) Lucas May	12	37	3	7	1	0	0	6	.189	0
Pitcher totals	162	16	1	2	1	0	0	1	.125	0
Team totals	162	5604	676	1534	279	31	121	640	.274	115

=== Pitching ===
Note: W = Wins; L = Losses; ERA = Earned run average; G = Games pitched; GS = Games started; SV = Saves; IP = Innings pitched; R = Runs allowed; ER = Earned runs allowed; BB = Walks allowed; SO = Strikeouts

Player	W	L	ERA	G	GS	SV	IP	R	ER	BB	SO
SP Zack Greinke	10	14	4.17	33	33	0	220.0	114	102	55	181
SP Kyle Davies	8	12	5.34	32	32	0	183.2	114	109	80	126
SP Bruce Chen	12	7	4.17	33	23	1	140.1	68	65	57	98
SP Brian Bannister	7	12	6.34	24	23	0	127.2	92	90	50	77
SP Luke Hochevar	6	6	4.81	18	17	0	103.0	61	55	37	76
SP Sean O'Sullivan	3	6	6.11	14	13	0	70.2	50	48	27	37
CL Joakim Soria	1	2	1.78	66	0	43	65.2	13	13	16	71
RP Rob Tejeda	3	5	3.54	54	0	0	61.0	28	24	26	56
RP Dusty Hughes	1	3	3.83	57	0	0	56.1	28	24	24	34
RP Blake Wood	1	3	5.07	51	0	0	49.2	29	28	22	31
RP Kyle Farnsworth	3	0	2.42	37	0	0	44.2	13	12	12	36
Gil Meche	0	5	5.69	20	9	0	61.2	42	39	38	41
Kanekoa Texeira	1	0	4.64	27	0	0	42.2	24	22	15	19
Bryan Bullington	1	4	6.12	13	5	0	42.2	29	29	17	29
Víctor Marte	3	0	9.76	22	0	0	27.2	30	30	15	19
Anthony Lerew	1	4	8.54	6	6	0	26.1	25	25	9	18
Jesse Chavez	2	3	5.88	23	0	0	26.0	20	17	11	16
Philip Humber	2	1	4.15	8	1	0	21.2	10	10	7	16
Brad Thompson	0	4	6.41	16	0	0	19.2	16	14	4	10
Greg Holland	0	1	6.75	15	0	0	18.2	15	14	8	23
Josh Rupe	1	1	5.59	11	0	0	9.2	6	6	7	8
John Parrish	1	1	3.00	9	0	0	6.0	2	2	5	4
Juan Cruz	0	0	3.38	5	0	0	5.1	2	2	4	7
Luis Mendoza	0	1	22.50	4	0	0	4.0	10	10	3	1
Román Colón	0	0	18.00	5	0	0	2.0	4	4	2	1
Team totals	67	95	4.97	162	162	44	1436.2	845	794	551	1035

== Farm system ==
Level	Team	League	Manager
AAA	Omaha Royals	Pacific Coast League	Mike Jirschele
AA	Northwest Arkansas Naturals	Texas League	Brian Poldberg
A	Wilmington Blue Rocks	Carolina League	Brian Rupp
A	Burlington Bees	Midwest League	Jim Gabella
Rookie	Burlington Royals	Appalachian League	Nelson Liriano
Rookie	AZL Royals	Arizona League	Darryl Kennedy
Rookie	Idaho Falls Chukars	Pioneer League	Brian Buchanan

LEAGUE CHAMPIONS: Northwest Arkansas
