= 2010 Chicago White Sox season =

2010 Chicago White Sox
- League: American League
- Division: Central
- Ballpark: U.S. Cellular Field
- City: Chicago, Illinois
- Record: 88–74 (.543)
- Divisional place: 2nd
- Owners: Jerry Reinsdorf
- General managers: Kenny Williams
- Managers: Ozzie Guillén
- Television: CSN Chicago; CSN+ WGN-TV and WGN America; WCIU-TV (Ken Harrelson, Steve Stone)
- Radio: WSCR (Ed Farmer, Darrin Jackson); WRTO (Spanish)

The 2010 Chicago White Sox season was the organization's 111th season in Chicago and 110th in the American League. The Sox opened the season against the Cleveland Indians at home on April 5 and closed the season also against the Indians at home on October 3. They finished the season with an 88–74 record, in second place in the American League Central, six games behind the division champions Minnesota Twins.

The interleague games that the Sox played were Chicago Cubs both at home and on the road since Sox and Cubs are crosstown rivals, Atlanta Braves and Florida Marlins at home, and Washington Nationals and Pittsburgh Pirates on the road. It was the fifth year in a row that the Sox competed against Pittsburgh as an interleague team besides the Cubs. Also it was the first time that Sox played the Washington Nationals since that franchise moved from Montreal following the 2004 season.

== Offseason ==
- October 5, 2009 – SP Freddy García 2010 $1 million option picked up.
- October 6, 2009 – RP Matt Thornton 2010 $2.25 million option picked up.
- October 9, 2009 – OF DeWayne Wise granted free agency after rejecting a Triple A assignment.
- November 5, 2009 – OF/1B Mark Kotsay is resigned 1 year/$1.5 million.
- November 5, 2009 – Acquire 3B Mark Teahen from Kansas City, via trade for 2B Chris Getz and 3B Josh Fields.
- November 6, 2009 – OF Jermaine Dye $12 million mutual option is declined, declaring him a free agent.
- November 23, 2009 – INF Omar Vizquel agrees to 1 year/$1.375 million deal.
- November 25, 2009 – OF/DH Andruw Jones agrees to 1 year/$500K deal, with the ability to earn $1 million in performance bonus.
- December 11, 2009 – RP J. J. Putz agrees to 1 year/$3 million deal with $3 million incentive bonuses.
- December 12, 2009 – RP D. J. Carrasco is non-tendered declaring him a Free Agent.
- December 18, 2009 – Acquired OF Juan Pierre from Los Angeles Dodgers for minor league pitchers Jon Link and John Ely.

== Spring training ==
=== March ===
(9–16–5)

=== April ===
(3–0)

== Regular season ==
=== Season standings ===
==== American League Central ====
AL Central
Team	W	L	Pct.	GB	Home	Road
Minnesota Twins	94	68	.580	—	53‍–‍28	41‍–‍40
Chicago White Sox	88	74	.543	6	45‍–‍36	43‍–‍38
Detroit Tigers	81	81	.500	13	52‍–‍29	29‍–‍52
Cleveland Indians	69	93	.426	25	38‍–‍43	31‍–‍50
Kansas City Royals	67	95	.414	27	38‍–‍43	29‍–‍52

==== American League Wild Card ====
Division winners
Team	W	L	Pct.
Tampa Bay Rays	96	66	.593
Minnesota Twins	94	68	.580
Texas Rangers	90	72	.556

Wild Card team (Top team qualifies for postseason)
Team	W	L	Pct.	GB
New York Yankees	95	67	.586	—
Boston Red Sox	89	73	.549	6
Chicago White Sox	88	74	.543	7
Toronto Blue Jays	85	77	.525	10
Detroit Tigers	81	81	.500	14
Oakland Athletics	81	81	.500	14
Los Angeles Angels of Anaheim	80	82	.494	15
Cleveland Indians	69	93	.426	26
Kansas City Royals	67	95	.414	28
Baltimore Orioles	66	96	.407	29
Seattle Mariners	61	101	.377	34

==== Record vs. opponents ====
2010 American League record Source: MLB Standings Grid – 2010
Team	BAL	BOS	CWS	CLE	DET	KC	LAA	MIN	NYY	OAK	SEA	TB	TEX	TOR	NL
Baltimore	–	9–9	4–3	3–3	5–5	2–4	6–0	3–5	5–13	3–7	3–6	7–11	6–4	3–15	7–11
Boston	9–9	–	1–6	4–4	3–3	4–3	9–1	3–2	9–9	4–5	7–3	7–11	4–6	12–6	13–5
Chicago	3–4	6–1	–	9–9	8–10	10–8	7–2	5–13	2–4	4–5	9–1	3–4	4–5	3–5	15–3
Cleveland	3–3	4–4	9–9	–	9–9	10–8	5–4	6–12	2–6	3–6	3–4	2–7	2–4	6–4	5–13
Detroit	5–5	3–3	10–8	9–9	–	10–8	6–4	9–9	4–4	3–3	3–5	1–6	3–6	4–4	11–7
Kansas City	4–2	3-4	9–10	8–10	8–10	–	3-7	5–13	3–5	3–6	5–4	4–4	2–7	3–3	8–10
Los Angeles	0–6	1–9	2–7	4–5	4–6	7–3	–	2–5	4–4	11–8	15–4	4–5	9–10	6–3	11–7
Minnesota	5–3	2–3	13–5	12–6	9–9	13–5	5–2	–	2–4	6–3	6-4	3–5	7–3	3–6	8–10
New York	13–5	9–9	4–2	6-2	4–4	5–3	4–4	4–2	–	9–1	6–4	8–10	4–4	8–10	11–7
Oakland	7–3	5–4	5–4	6–3	3–3	6–3	8–11	3–6	1–9	–	13–6	4–5	9–10	3–4	8–10
Seattle	6–3	3–7	1–9	4–3	5–3	4–5	4–15	4–6	4–6	6–13	–	2–7	7–12	2–3	9–9
Tampa Bay	11–7	11–7	4–3	7–2	6–1	4–4	5–4	5–3	10–8	5–4	7–2	–	4–2	10–8	7–11
Texas	4–6	6–4	5–4	4–2	6–3	7–2	10-9	3-7	4-4	10-9	12–7	2–4	–	3–7	14–4
Toronto	15–3	6–12	5–3	4–6	4–4	3–3	3–6	6–3	10–8	4–3	3–2	8–10	7–3	–	7–11

- Source: MLB Standings Grid – 2010

==== Detailed records ====
Opponent	Home	Away	Total	Pct.	Runs scored	Runs allowed
AL East
Baltimore Orioles	2–1	1–3	3–4	.429	27	20
Boston Red Sox	3–1	3–0	6–1	.857	32	21
New York Yankees	1–2	1–2	2–4	.333	33	42
Tampa Bay Rays	1–2	2–2	3–4	.429	24	43
Toronto Blue Jays	1–3	2–2	3–5	.375	42	40
	8–9	9–9	17–18	.486	158	166
AL Central
Cleveland Indians	4–5	5–4	9–9	.500	80	86
Detroit Tigers	3–6	5–4	8–10	.444	89	94
Kansas City Royals	7–2	3–6	10–8	.556	96	78
Minnesota Twins	2–7	3–6	5–13	.278	83	98
	16–20	16–20	32–40	.444	348	356
AL West
Los Angeles Angels	4–2	3–0	7–2	.778	38	20
Oakland Athletics	2–1	2–4	4–5	.444	29	38
Seattle Mariners	7–0	2–1	9–1	.900	58	26
Texas Rangers	1–2	3–3	4–5	.444	40	45
	14–5	10–8	24–13	.649	165	129
Interleague
Atlanta Braves	3–0	0–0	3–0	1.000	15	8
Chicago Cubs	2–1	2–1	4–2	.667	27	17
Florida Marlins	2–1	0–0	2–1	.667	12	14
Pittsburgh Pirates	0–0	3–0	3–0	1.000	18	10
Washington Nationals	0–0	3–0	3–0	1.000	9	4
	7–2	8–1	15–3	.833	81	53

=== Season summary ===
==== General ====
- Games played: 162
- Record: 88–74
- Winning percentage: .543
- Rank: 2nd
- Games behind: 6.0
- Biggest lead: 3.5 games (last on July 20)
- Farthest behind: 12.0 games (last on September 22)
- Most games over .500: 17 (last on September 6)
- Most games under .500: 9 (last on June 8)
- Longest winning streak: 11 (June 15 to 26)
- Longest losing streak: 8 (September 14 to 21)
- Series record: 25–24–3
- Series sweep: 10–4
- Longest game: 12 innings (May 7 vs. Blue Jays)
- Shortest game: 6 innings (October 2 vs. Indians)

==== Records ====
- Home: 45–36
- Road: 43–38
- Day: 31–18
- Night: 57–56
- Open: 86–72
- Dome: 2–2
- Grass: 84–70
- Turf: 4–4
- vs. RHP: 68–54
- vs. LHP: 20–20
- vs. East division teams: 17–18
- vs. Central division teams: 32–40
- vs. West division teams: 24–13
- vs. American League teams: 73–71
- vs. National League teams: 15–3
- vs. winning teams (>.500): 26–32
- vs. tying teams (.500): 12–15
- vs. losing teams (<.500): 50–27
- April: 9–14
- May: 13–14
- June: 18–9
- July: 18–8
- August: 14–15
- September: 14–13
- October: 2–1
- First half: 49–38
- Second half: 39–36
- Sunday: 12–14
- Monday: 9–4
- Tuesday: 13–12
- Wednesday: 13–12
- Thursday: 12–9
- Friday: 14–10
- Saturday: 15–13

==== Scoring ====
- Runs scored: 752
- Runs allowed: 704
- Pythagorean record: 86–76
- Runs scored per game: 4.64
- Runs allowed per game: 4.35
- Blowout games: 23–20
- One-run games: 28–21
- 9-inning games: 81–64
- Extra-inning games: 6–10
- Shortened games: 1–0
- Walk-off wins: 3
- Walk-off losses: 7
- Comeback victories: 44
- Blown leads: 34
- Shutouts: 11
- Shutouts by opponent: 5
- 10+ runs scored: 9
- 10+ runs allowed: 9
- Most runs scored: 15 (June 9 vs. Tigers and July 11 vs. Royals)
- Most runs allowed: 13 (May 23 vs. Marlins and August 15 vs. Tigers)

=== Composite inning summary ===
	1	2	3	4	5	6	7	8	9	10	11	12
Runs scored	82	77	66	90	99	102	83	81	60	3	9	0
Runs allowed	85	70	85	80	75	82	89	66	56	5	8	3

=== Opening Day lineup ===
1	Juan Pierre	LF
15	Gordon Beckham	2B
20	Carlos Quentin	RF
14	Paul Konerko	1B
7	Mark Kotsay	DH
51	Alex Ríos	CF
12	A. J. Pierzynski	C
23	Mark Teahen	3B
10	Alexei Ramírez	SS
56	Mark Buehrle	P

=== Summaries by month ===
==== April ====
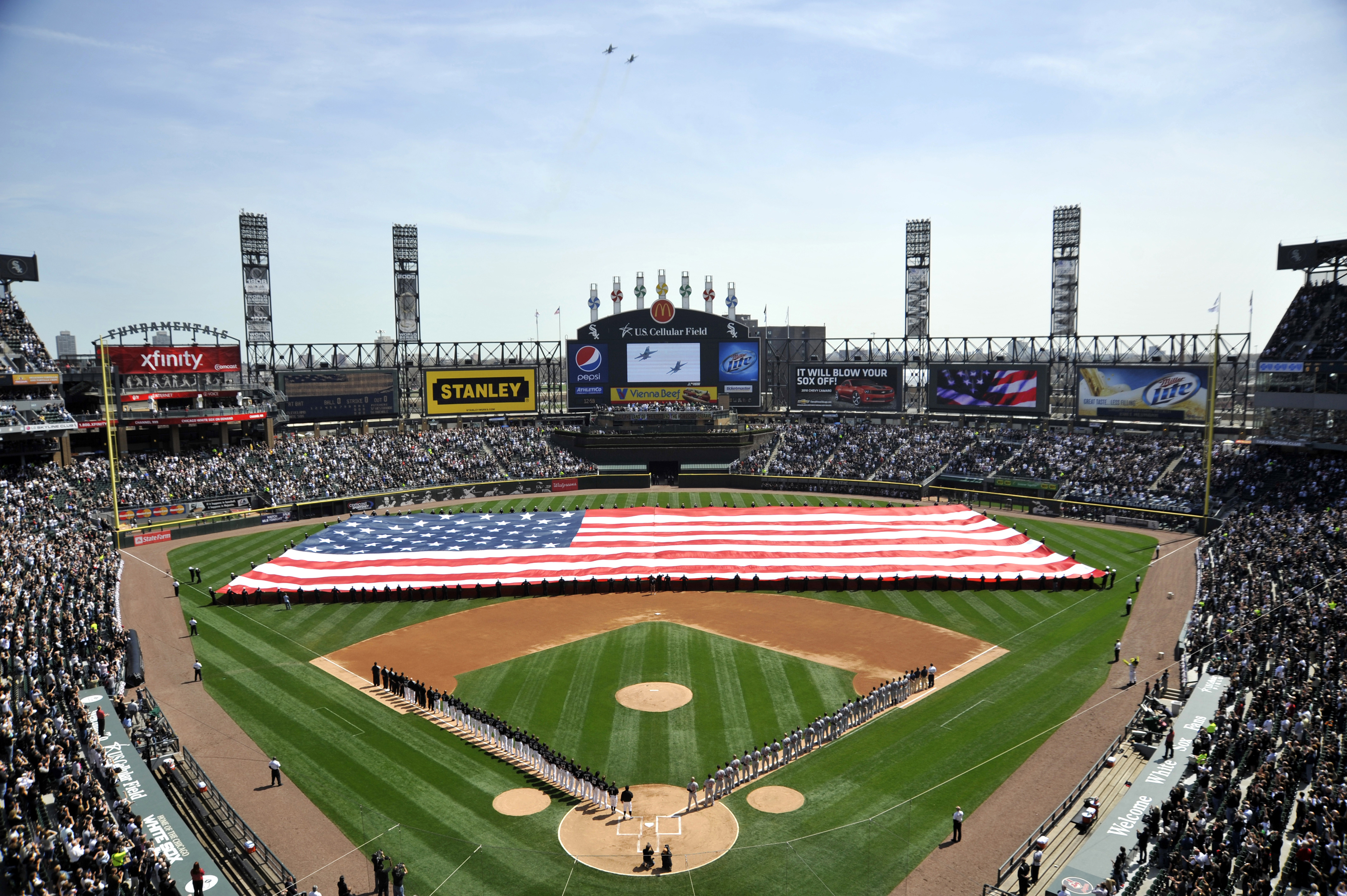
2010 White Sox Opening Day.

On the Opening Day, the White Sox shutout the Cleveland 6–0. On that day, Mark Buehrle made an astounding play when he hurried and picked up a ball with his glove in foul territory and quickly underthrew backwards with his glove to Paul Konerko, who caught the ball with his bare hand to force out Lou Marson in the fifth inning for the second out. On April 12 at Blue Jays, the Sox snapped their ten-game losing streak in Rogers Centre and took the first victory since June 1, 2007, beating the Blue Jays 8–7 in 11 innings. In the next two games, Carlos Quentin hit the White Sox's first grand slam of the season, beating the Jays 11–1. The Sox split the four-game series with Blue Jays. On April 16–18, the Sox got swept by the Indians in Cleveland for the first time since May 30 to June 2, 2003. On April 23 against the Mariners, Andruw Jones hit two home runs on his 33rd birthday including his walk-off home run which made it 7–6. On the next day, in the top of the ninth inning, Casey Kotchman hit a soft ground ball down the right field line and a fan reached over and pick up the ball with his bare hand in foul territory. This is a fan interference ground rule double which two men scored from first and second making it 4–2 Mariner lead. Then in the bottom frame, the Sox scored three runs via two home runs, one by Paul Konerko (solo shot) and a walk-off by Alex Ríos (two-run homer), which made it 5–4. On the next day, White Sox swept the Mariners at a score of 3–2 with Paul Konerko's GW home run in the eighth inning. Paul Konerko broke the franchise record for most home runs hit during the month of April with 11. However the Sox finished the month with a not-so good record of 9–14.

==== May ====
On May 7 against the Toronto Blue Jays at home, J. J. Putz allowed a three-run home run to Álex González in the twelfth inning which made it 7–4 for the White Sox loss. Two days later against the same team, Bobby Jenks blew his save for allowing Fred Lewis a three-run home run which made it 8–7 Toronto lead. Sox lost three-out-of-four at home against the Toronto Blue Jays while the Sox split the series in Toronto last month. On May 11, the Sox opened the two-game series at the new Target Field and took the victory 5–2 over Minnesota, but the next day lost 3–2. On May 21 against the Florida Marlins in first interleague play, the Sox took the victory 8–0 as Alexei Ramírez had 5 RBIs with two-run double and three-run homer. Two days later, the Sox suffered a big shut-out loss 13–0 to the Marlins on Sunday. The Sox finished the month with a record of 13–14.

==== June ====
On June 13 against the Cubs at Wrigley Field, Gavin Floyd pitched a no-hitter through 6.2 innings before allowing a double to Alfonso Soriano and then the next batter scored Soriano by Chad Tracy's RBI single. The opposing pitcher Ted Lilly didn't allow a hit through 8+ innings before allowing a single to Juan Pierre. Later that inning, the bases were loaded, so it would have golden opportunities for Sox to score some runs, but failed. The Sox failed to sweep the Cubs as they lose 1–0 with one hit for Sox and three hits for Cubs. From June 12–20, they went eight straight games without hitting home runs, their longest since 1989, which they went nine straight homerless games. However, during their homerless streak, the Sox went 7–1, thanks to their starting pitching. During their span, the Sox have won six straight without hitting home runs for the first time since 1942. Then on June 22 against the Atlanta Braves, Carlos Quentin blasted a 3-run homer in the fourth inning, snapping their 8-game homerless streak in a 9–6 seventh straight win. For the Braves, they snapped their 42-game winning streak when scoring five or more runs, dating back to last season. From June 15–24, the Sox went three-consecutive three-game sweeps for the first time in franchise history. They swept the Pittsburgh Pirates and Washington Nationals on the road, and Atlanta Braves at home. They have won eleven in a row for the first time since June 1961, which they have won twelve in a row. The Sox finished the month with an awesome 18–9 record.

==== July ====
On July 5–8, the Sox got their four-game sweep over the Los Angeles Angels for the first time since 2005 when they swept the Astros in the World Series. On July 11 against the Kansas City Royals, Andruw Jones hit his 400th career home run in third inning, 46th player in major league history to accomplish this feat. Also the Sox hit five home runs in the game, including four in third inning, tying their franchise history, including two back-to-backs. The Sox swept the Royals with a 15−5 victory and finished with a perfect homestand 7–0. From June 8 until the All-Star break, the Sox were 25–5, their best in MLB. On June 8, the Sox were 24–33 and 9½ games out of the first place. Just 40 days later, the Sox were 50–41 and were in first place by 1½ games over the Detroit Tigers. On July 18 against the Minnesota Twins at Target Field, the Sox led 6–3 going into the bottom of the ninth inning. Then the Twins scored four runs without getting anybody out and suffering Sox their first walk-off loss of the season. Just three days later, the Sox suffered another walk-off loss, this time in extra innings at Seattle Mariners. The Sox scored one run in the top 11 and then Mariners came back with two in the bottom 11. One day after that defeat by Mariners, manager Ozzie Guillén was considering J. J. Putz to replace Bobby Jenks as a closer after blowing his save twice over his last three appearances. On July 23, Mark Buehrle celebrated one-year anniversary of his perfect game by taking a complete game victory over the Oakland Athletics in Oakland. He allowed 1 earned run, 4 hits, 0 walk and 2 strikeouts. From July 26–29, the Sox swept the four-game series over the Seattle Mariners for the first time since 1994 and finished the season series versus the Mariners 9–1 and outscoring them 58–26. The Sox finished the month with an overall record of 18–8 and incredible 12–1 at home.

==== August ====
On August 3, the White Sox played a split doubleheader at Detroit Tigers, which the Sox won 12–2 in afternoon game and lost 7–1 in night game. The afternoon game was a made-up game from May 17. The next day, Edwin Jackson made his White Sox debut against his former teammate, in which he had 7.0 IP, 9 H, ER, BB, 6 K. Jackson took his first win with the White Sox since moving from Arizona against Armando Galarraga, whose perfect game was lost by the blown call by an umpire on June 2. Jackson threw a no-hitter against the Tampa Bay Rays in St. Petersburg on June 25. Also on the same day, Chris Sale, who was the White Sox's 13th overall pick in the 2010 Major League Baseball draft, was added to the roster as a relief pitcher. Sale was the first 2010 draft pick to be added to an MLB roster. After that game, the Sox were 37–13 (.740) over their last 50 games since June 8, the best record in MLB during that span. On the next day, in the top of the ninth inning, Paul Konerko singled and Mark Kotsay hit a two-run home run which made it a 4–1 Sox lead. But in the bottom of that frame, Ryan Raburn hit a game-tying three-run homer off of Bobby Jenks which tied the game at 4–4. Then in the top of the 11th, Mark Kotsay hit a two-run triple on which Brent Lillibridge and Andruw Jones scored which made it 6–4 Sox lead. In the bottom of the 11th with two outs, Ryan Raburn, who hit a game-tying three-run homer in the ninth, grounded out with men on first and second to end game for a White Sox victory. Sergio Santos got his first major league victory after he pitched two innings following Jenks, who blew his third save of the season. In that series, the White Sox took three out of four from the Tigers in Comerica Park, even though Tigers had one of the best home records in the American League. On August 9 against the Baltimore Orioles at Camden Yards, it is the first time this season that the White Sox pitcher (J. J. Putz) allow a walk-off home run (to Brian Roberts) and lost 3-out-of-4 in a series with two walk-off extra-inning losses under the Orioles' new manager Buck Showalter. The Sox got four walk-off losses since the All-Star break and were then 2–4 in walk-off games that season. For the Orioles, they led the American League in walk-off wins at 9, including three under Showalter. From August 10 to 12, the Sox lost the series against the Twins and fell to second place in the AL Central, one game back. Also the Sox lost the series at home for the first time since June 4–6 against the Indians, snapping their seven straight home series wins. During the time between series losses at home, the Sox were 20–3 while the Sox swept four opponents. From August 17–19, the Sox played a series against the rival Twins at Target Field when the Sox were three games behind the first-place Twins prior to the first game. In the first game, the former White Sox teammate Jim Thome hit a walk-off two-run homer off of Matt Thornton in the tenth inning to down the White Sox 7–6. In the second game, the Twins beat the Sox again 7–6 with the final batter out. And then in the third game, the Sox blew out the Twins 11–0 to avoid a sweep. The Sox snapped the Twins 9-game home winning streak and they snapped their five-game losing streak at Target Field. On August 29, The White Sox hosted Frank Thomas day at U.S. Cellular Field against the New York Yankees. Thomas' jersey was retired that day, along with his face put up on the legendary wall in right-center field next to Billy Pierce on his left and Carlton Fisk on his right, and also right under 'The Catch' logo. On August 30 against the Indians in Cleveland, in the bottom of the ninth inning, the Sox blew a three-run lead to tie the game at 6 thanks to his fourth blown save by Jenks. Then in the top of the eleventh inning, the Sox scored four runs, all with two outs, including Brent Lillibridge's second home run of the season. The Sox took the victory 10–6. They were now 2–1 when they had given up a three-run lead in the ninth. Also on that same day, Chicago acquired Manny Ramírez off waivers from the Los Angeles Dodgers. The White Sox finished with a record of 14–15 in August and 0–5 in walk-off games.

==== September ====
On September 3, the game in Boston was postponed due to Hurricane Earl. On September 4, the White Sox swept the doubleheader at Red Sox with identical scores 3–1 with both saves from Bobby Jenks. It is the first time the White Sox swept the doubleheader in Boston since 1991. Then on September 5, the White Sox swept the Red Sox at Fenway Park for their first time since July 27–28, 1991 when the Sox came back with four runs in the top of the ninth inning to take a 7–5 lead, all with two outs. Also, Manny Ramírez faced his former teammate, which he went 3–8 combined in this series. The White Sox finished the 10-game road trip 7–3, all three losses came in final three road games. With the WLLL format in four-game series at Tigers, since 2006, they're 0–7 in the finale of the four-game set after winning the first game and losing the next two. On September 12, Lucas Harrell allowed six runs in the first inning in courtesy of two three-run homers even before the Sox will bat, then the Sox scored twelve unanswered runs to beat the Royals 12–6 and win this weekend series. It is the biggest White Sox comeback so far this season. Also in this game, Paul Konerko hit two two-run homers and five RBIs, recording his fourth career 30 homer/100 RBI season. From September 14–16, the Sox got swept by Twins at home, losing 9 of their last 11 home games against these Twins. With that sweep, the Sox fell to nine games back and Twins outscored the Sox 26–11. Then the next series against the Tigers at home, the Sox got swept again. The Sox got swept by Tigers at home for the first time since April 2001. During the finale of that series, the Sox tied the game at 7 after scoring four runs in the bottom of the ninth inning. The Sox lost in 11 innings to Tigers 9–7, but in the bottom of the eleventh, Paul Konerko nearly hit a walk-off three-run homer, but it was foul just a couple feet from the foul pole. In that game, the Sox left 21 men on base and went 4–24 with runners in scoring position. On September 18 the White Sox recognized organist Nancy Faust in a pregame ceremony on her retirement after 41 years. On September 22 at Oakland Athletics, the Sox avoided getting swept for third consecutive times by scoring two runs in the top of the ninth inning and went on to a 4–3 victory. That victory also avoided their nine-game losing streak for the first time since 1991 and first time in September since 1976. Then the Sox swept the Angels in Los Angeles for the first time since April 2006. In this series, the Sox outscored the Angels 12–6 and finished the season series against the Angels 7–2 and won seven in a row against them. They finished the season road record 43–38 (4th best in AL, 3rd best since 1999), better than last year's 36–45. In this season, the Sox swept five opponents on the road compared to two last season, four of them are the losing teams. Finally on September 28 against the Boston Red Sox, Dayán Viciedo gave the White Sox their first walk-off hit since April 24, winning it 5–4, which came back from a 3–0 deficit. It is only the third walk-off win this season which trails the majors against seven walk-off losses, all since the All-Star break. The result of this four-game series against the Red Sox is LWWW, first time they had this result since 2006. The White Sox finished September with a record of 14–13.

==== October ====
The White Sox concluded the regular season with a 2–1 record in October.

=== Game log ===
Legend
White Sox Win	White Sox Loss	Game postponed

2010 White Sox game log
April (9–14) – Home (6–6) – Road (3–8) – 92 R.S. 111 R.A.

#	Date	Opponent	Score	Win	Loss	Save	Time	Att.	Record	GB	Box
1	April 5	Indians	6–0	Buehrle (1–0)	Westbrook (0–1)		2:24	38,935	1–0	0	box
2	April 7	Indians	5–3	Carmona (1–0)	Williams (0–1)	Perez (1)	3:10	19,514	1–1	−½	box
3	April 8	Indians	5–3 (11)	Lewis (1–0)	Putz (0–1)	Perez (2)	3:59	18,637	1–2	−1½	box
4	April 9	Twins	4–3 (11)	Duensing (1–0)	Peña (0–1)	Rauch (3)	3:43	21,416	1–3	−2½	box
5	April 10	Twins	2–1	Baker (1–1)	García (0–1)	Rauch (4)	2:35	28,337	1–4	−3½	box
6	April 11	Twins	5–4	Buehrle (2–0)	Blackburn (1–1)	Jenks (1)	2:14	25,550	2–4	−3	box
7	April 12	@ Blue Jays	8–7 (11)	Thornton (1–0)	Accardo (0–1)	Jenks (2)	3:29	46,321	3–4	−2½	box
8	April 13	@ Blue Jays	4–2	Romero (1–0)	Floyd (0–1)	Gregg (3)	2:11	12,167	3–5	−3	box
9	April 14	@ Blue Jays	11–1	Danks (1–0)	Morrow (0–1)		2:47	10,610	4–5	−2	box
10	April 15	@ Blue Jays	7–3	Eveland (2–0)	García (0–2)		2:47	10,744	4–6	−3	box
11	April 16	@ Indians	6–2	Talbot (1–1)	Buehrle (2–1)		2:04	10,421	4–7	−4	box
12	April 17	@ Indians	3–2	Lewis (2–0)	Thornton (1–1)	Perez (3)	2:44	12,885	4–8	−5	box
13	April 18	@ Indians	7–4	Carmona (2–0)	Floyd (0–2)	Perez (4)	3:07	10,564	4–9	−5	box
14	April 20	Rays	4–1	Danks (2–0)	Price (2–1)	Jenks (3)	2:22	19,260	5–9	−5	box
15	April 21	Rays	12–0	Davis (1–1)	Buehrle (2–2)		3:00	17,023	5–10	−6	box
16	April 22	Rays	10–2	Shields (2–0)	Peavy (0–1)		2:50	18,207	5–11	−6	box
17	April 23	Mariners	7–6	Thornton (2–1)	Lowe (1–2)		2:57	24,653	6–11	−6	box
18	April 24	Mariners	5–4	Jenks (1–0)	Aardsma (0–1)		2:34	25,253	7–11	−6	box
19	April 25	Mariners	3–2	Danks (3–0)	League (2–1)	Jenks (4)	2:14	28,274	8–11	−5	box
20	April 27	@ Rangers	4–2	Wilson (2–1)	Buehrle (2–3)	Francisco (1)	2:19	14,589	8–12	−6	box
21	April 28	@ Rangers	6–5	Harden (1–1)	Peavy (0–2)	Feliz (3)	2:48	20,432	8–13	−6	box
22	April 29	@ Rangers	7–5	Floyd (1–2)	O'Day (0–1)		2:53	17,778	9–13	−5	box
23	April 30	@ Yankees	6–4	Aceves (2–0)	Thornton (2–2)	Rivera (7)	2:58	44,783	9–14	−6	box

May (13–14) – Home (5–7) – Road (8–7) – 118 R.S. 127 R.A.

#	Date	Opponent	Score	Win	Loss	Save	Time	Att.	Record	GB	Box
24	May 1	@ Yankees	7–6	Linebrink (1–0)	Robertson (0–2)	Jenks (5)	3:49	45,265	10–14	−5	box
25	May 2	@ Yankees	12–3	Hughes (3–0)	Buehrle (2–4)		3:06	45,303	10–15	−6	box
26	May 3	Royals	5–1	Peavy (1–2)	Meche (0–3)		2:25	21,208	11–15	−6	box
27	May 4	Royals	7–2	Hochevar (3–1)	Floyd (1–3)		2:40	17,157	11–16	−7	box
28	May 5	Royals	9–2	García (1–2)	Bannister (1–2)		2:35	21,255	12–16	−7	box
29	May 6	Blue Jays	2–0	Eveland (3–1)	Danks (3–1)	Gregg (8)	2:30	20,106	12–17	−7	box
30	May 7	Blue Jays	7–4 (12)	Downs (1–3)	Putz (0–2)		3:12	20,072	12–18	−7½	box
31	May 8	Blue Jays	7–3	Peavy (2–2)	Cecil (2–2)		2:42	24,945	13–18	−7	box
32	May 9	Blue Jays	9–7	Frasor (2–1)	Jenks (1–1)	Gregg (9)	3:29	23,850	13–19	−8	box
33	May 11	@ Twins	5–2	García (2–2)	Slowey (4–3)	Jenks (6)	2:39	38,764	14–19	−7	box
34	May 12	@ Twins	3–2	Pavano (4–3)	Danks (3–2)	Rauch (9)	2:22	38,895	14–20	−8	box
35	May 14	@ Royals	6–1	Hughes (1–1)	Buehrle (2–5)		2:25	27,816	14–21	−8	box
36	May 15	@ Royals	5–4	Peavy (3–2)	Hochevar (3–2)	Thornton (1)	2:33	22,192	15–21	−7	box
37	May 16	@ Royals	5–3	Bannister (2–3)	Floyd (1–4)	Soria (9)	2:20	13,922	15–22	−8	box
–	May 17	@ Tigers	Postponed (rain), rescheduled for August 3							−8½	
38	May 18	@ Tigers	6–2	García (3–2)	Porcello (3–4)		2:44	28,155	16–22	−7½	box
39	May 19	Angels	3–2	Saunders (3–5)	Danks (3–3)	Fuentes (5)	2:26	23,271	16–23	−7½	box
40	May 20	Angels	6–5	Santana (3–3)	Peavy (3–3)	Fuentes (6)	3:00	23,515	16–24	−7½	box
41	May 21	Marlins	8–0	Buehrle (3–5)	Nolasco (4–3)		2:08	20,652	17–24	−7½	box
42	May 22	Marlins	4–1	Floyd (2–4)	Volstad (3–5)	Jenks (7)	2:46	28,462	18–24	−7½	box
43	May 23	Marlins	13–0	Johnson (5–1)	García (3–3)		3:14	28,298	18–25	−7½	box
44	May 24	@ Indians	7–2	Danks (4–3)	Masterson (0–5)		3:00	10,166	19–25	−7	box
45	May 25	@ Indians	7–3	Talbot (6–3)	Peavy (3–4)		2:16	14,441	19–26	−7	box
46	May 26	@ Indians	5–4	Peña (1–1)	Westbrook (2–3)		2:44	18,109	20–26	−6	box
47	May 27	@ Rays	5–1	Niemann (5–0)	Floyd (2–5)		2:29	13,299	20–27	−7	box
48	May 28	@ Rays	4–2	García (4–3)	Price (7–2)	Thornton (2)	2:35	20,650	21–27	−7	box
49	May 29	@ Rays	8–5	Davis (5–4)	Danks (4–4)	Soriano (14)	3:18	33,588	21–28	−8	box
50	May 30	@ Rays	8–5	Peavy (4–4)	Shields (5–3)		3:14	26,878	22–28	−8	box

June (18–9) – Home (9–6) – Road (9–3) – 125 R.S. 103 R.A.

#	Date	Opponent	Score	Win	Loss	Save	Time	Att.	Record	GB	Box
51	June 1	Rangers	9–6	Harden (3–1)	Buehrle (3–6)	Feliz (14)	3:19	20,075	22–29	−8½	box
52	June 2	Rangers	9–5	Feldman (3–5)	Floyd (2–6)		2:51	19,516	22–30	−8½	box
53	June 3	Rangers	4–3	García (5–3)	Lewis (4–4)	Jenks (8)	2:27	20,003	23–30	−7½	box
54	June 4	Indians	10–1	Masterson (1–5)	Danks (4–4)		3:08	20,713	23–31	−8½	box
55	June 5	Indians	3–1	Talbot (7–4)	Peavy (4–5)	Wood (4)	2:49	30,864	23–32	−9½	box
56	June 6	Indians	8–7	Putz (1–2)	Sipp (0–2)	Jenks (9)	3:17	27,577	24–32	−8½	box
57	June 8	Tigers	7–2	Thomas (3–0)	Thornton (2–3)		2:59	20,776	24–33	−9½	box
58	June 9	Tigers	15–3	García (6–3)	Porcello (4–6)		2:32	21,959	25–33	−9½	box
59	June 10	Tigers	3–0	Danks (5–5)	Scherzer (2–6)	Jenks (10)	2:15	26,004	26–33	−8½	box
60	June 11	@ Cubs	10–5	Peavy (5–5)	Wells (3–5)		3:08	41,129	27–33	−8½	box
61	June 12	@ Cubs	2–1	Buehrle (4–6)	Silva (8–1)	Jenks (11)	2:54	40,397	28–33	−7½	box
62	June 13	@ Cubs	1–0	Lilly (2–5)	Floyd (2–7)	Mármol (13)	2:20	40,456	28–34	−7½	box
63	June 15	@ Pirates	6–4	García (7–3)	Lincoln (0–1)	Jenks (12)	3:11	12,693	29–34	−7½	box
64	June 16	@ Pirates	7–2	Danks (6–5)	Duke (3–8)		2:26	15,218	30–34	−7½	box
65	June 17	@ Pirates	5–4	Buehrle (5–6)	Ohlendorf (0–5)	Jenks (13)	2:38	23,170	31–34	−6½	box
66	June 18	@ Nationals	2–1 (11)	Putz (2–2)	Storen (2–1)	Jenks (14)	2:55	40,325	32–34	−5½	box
67	June 19	@ Nationals	1–0	Peavy (6–5)	Martin (0–3)		2:34	36,487	33–34	−5½	box
68	June 20	@ Nationals	6–3	García (8–3)	Lannan (2–5)	Putz (1)	2:39	31,763	34–34	−5½	box
69	June 22	Braves	9–6	Danks (7–5)	Hanson (7–4)	Jenks (15)	2:38	28,773	35–34	−4½	box
70	June 23	Braves	4–2	Buehrle (6–6)	Hudson (7–3)	Jenks (16)	2:20	27,561	36–34	−3½	box
71	June 24	Braves	2–0	Putz (3–2)	Saito (1–3)	Jenks (17)	2:17	31,076	37–34	−2½	box
72	June 25	Cubs	6–0	Peavy (7–5)	Zambrano (3–6)		2:22	39,364	38–34	−1½	box
73	June 26	Cubs	3–2	Putz (4–2)	Cashner (0–1)	Thornton (3)	2:35	39,479	39–34	−1½	box
74	June 27	Cubs	8–6	Dempster (6–6)	Danks (7–6)		2:57	39,682	39–35	−1½	box
75	June 28	@ Royals	3–1	Lerew (1–1)	Buehrle (6–7)	Soria (19)	2:27	15,056	39–36	−2	box
76	June 29	@ Royals	4–3	Floyd (3–7)	Bannister (7–6)	Putz (2)	2:55	19,364	40–36	−1½	box
77	June 30	@ Royals	7–6	Greinke (4–8)	Peavy (7–6)	Soria (20)	2:30	18,335	40–37	−2½	box

July (18–8) – Home (12–1) – Road (6–7) – 140 R.S. 84 R.A.

#	Date	Opponent	Score	Win	Loss	Save	Time	Att.	Record	GB	Box
78	July 2	@ Rangers	5–3	Putz (5–2)	Feliz (1–2)	Thornton (4)	2:54	30,193	41–37	−2	box
79	July 3	@ Rangers	3–1	Hunter (5–0)	Danks (7–7)	Feliz (22)	2:33	25,986	41–38	−2	box
80	July 4	@ Rangers	5–3	Buehrle (7–7)	Feldman (5–8)	Thornton (5)	2:27	45,020	42–38	−1	box
81	July 5	Angels	9–2	Floyd (4–7)	Kazmir (7–8)	Santos (1)	2:49	38,092	43–38	−1	box
82	July 6	Angels	4–1	Peña (2–1)	Weaver (8–4)	Jenks (18)	2:54	21,889	44–38	−1	box
83	July 7	Angels	5–2	García (9–3)	Saunders (6–9)	Jenks (19)	2:48	21,135	45–38	−1	box
84	July 8	Angels	1–0	Danks (8–7)	Santana (8–7)		1:50	27,734	46–38	−½	box
85	July 9	Royals	8–2	Buehrle (8–7)	Chen (5–3)		2:38	25,572	47–38	−½	box
86	July 10	Royals	5–1	Floyd (5–7)	Bannister (7–7)		2:22	32,339	48–38	−½	box
87	July 11	Royals	15–5	Peña (3–1)	Lerew (1–3)		2:43	29,040	49–38	+½	box
All–Star Break: NL defeats AL 3–1 at Angel Stadium of Anaheim
88	July 15	@ Twins	8–7	Danks (9–7)	Burnett (1–2)	Jenks (20)	3:34	40,697	50–38	+1	box
89	July 16	@ Twins	7–4	Liriano (7–7)	Floyd (5–8)	Crain (1)	3:09	40,427	50–39	+1	box
90	July 17	@ Twins	3–2	Pavano (11–6)	Buehrle (8–8)		1:52	40,637	50–40	+1½	box
91	July 18	@ Twins	7–6	Duensing (3–1)	Jenks (1–2)		3:07	40,336	50–41	+1½	box
92	July 19	@ Mariners	6–1	Hudson (1–0)	Pauley (0–2)		2:45	21,749	51–41	+2½	box
93	July 20	@ Mariners	4–0	Danks (10–7)	Fister (3–6)		2:11	21,366	52–41	+3½	box
94	July 21	@ Mariners	2–1 (11)	League (7–6)	Jenks (1–3)		2:49	21,529	52–42	+2½	box
95	July 23	@ Athletics	5–1	Buehrle (9–8)	Cahill (9–4)		2:16	15,103	53–42	+2½	box
96	July 24	@ Athletics	10–2	Mazzaro (6–2)	García (9–4)		3:04	17,439	53–43	+2	box
97	July 25	@ Athletics	6–4	Braden (5–7)	Hudson (1–1)	Wuertz (3)	2:46	17,148	53–44	+1	box
98	July 26	Mariners	6–1	Danks (11–7)	Hernández (7–7)		2:24	38,815	54–44	+1	box
99	July 27	Mariners	11–0	Floyd (6–8)	Rowland-Smith (1–10)		2:04	26,080	55–44	+1	box
100	July 28	Mariners	6–5	Thornton (3–3)	Wright (1–3)	Jenks (21)	2:57	25,126	56–44	+1	box
101	July 29	Mariners	9–5	García (10–4)	Pauley (0–3)		2:43	28,483	57–44	+1½	box
102	July 30	Athletics	6–1	Harrell (1–0)	Anderson (2–2)		2:34	29,431	58–44	+1½	box
103	July 31	Athletics	6–2	Braden (6–7)	Danks (11–8)		2:27	35,852	58–45	+½	box

August (14–15) – Home (6–7) – Road (8–8) – 155 R.S. 130 R.A.

#	Date	Opponent	Score	Win	Loss	Save	Time	Att.	Record	GB	Box
104	August 1	Athletics	4–1	Floyd (7–8)	Gonzalez (9–7)	Jenks (22)	2:19	32,118	59–45	+½	box
105	August 3	@ Tigers	12–2	Buehrle (10–8)	Porcello (4–10)		2:25	26,141	60–45	+1½	box
106	August 3	@ Tigers	7–1	Bonderman (6–6)	Torres (0–1)		2:27	24,826	60–46	+1½	box
107	August 4	@ Tigers	4–1	Jackson (1–0)	Galarraga (3–4)	Jenks (23)	2:51	31,770	61–46	+1½	box
108	August 5	@ Tigers	6–4 (11)	Santos (1–0)	Valverde (1–3)		3:18	34,156	62–46	+1½	box
109	August 6	@ Orioles	2–1 (10)	Simón (3–2)	Peña (3–2)		2:57	19,687	62–47	+1½	box
110	August 7	@ Orioles	4–2	Floyd (8–8)	Berken (3–3)	Putz (3)	2:49	24,939	63–47	+1½	box
111	August 8	@ Orioles	4–3	Guthrie (6–11)	Buehrle (10–9)	Simón (17)	2:19	18,283	63–48	+½	box
112	August 9	@ Orioles	3–2 (10)	Albers (4–3)	Putz (5–3)		2:58	14,135	63–49	0	box
113	August 10	Twins	12–6	Baker (10–9)	García (10–5)		2:52	30,900	63–50	−1	box
114	August 11	Twins	6–1	Danks (12–8)	Perkins (0–1)		2:35	32,033	64–50	0	box
115	August 12	Twins	6–1	Liriano (11–7)	Floyd (8–9)		3:09	33,237	64–51	−1	box
116	August 13	Tigers	8–4	Buehrle (11–9)	Bonderman (6–8)		2:20	34,834	65–51	−1	box
117	August 14	Tigers	3–2	Coke (7–2)	Putz (5–4)		2:53	36,548	65–52	−2	box
118	August 15	Tigers	13–8	Thomas (5–1)	Putz (5–5)		3:31	36,287	65–53	−3	box
119	August 17	@ Twins	7–6 (10)	Mahay (1–1)	Thornton (3–4)		3:11	40,714	65–54	−4	box
120	August 18	@ Twins	7–6	Manship (1–0)	Floyd (8–10)	Capps (31)	3:11	40,702	65–55	−5	box
121	August 19	@ Twins	11–0	Buehrle (12–9)	Pavano (15–8)		2:31	40,723	66–55	−4	box
–	August 20	@ Royals	Postponed (rain), rescheduled for August 21							−4½	
122	August 21	@ Royals	6–5 (11)	Chavez (5–3)	Sale (0–1)		3:25	N/A	66–56	−4½	box
123	August 21	@ Royals	7–6 (10)	Putz (6–5)	Holland (0–1)		3:06	25,543	67–56	−4	box
124	August 22	@ Royals	3–2 (10)	O'Sullivan (2–4)	Linebrink (1–1)		3:01	18,877	67–57	−5	box
125	August 24	Orioles	7–5	Floyd (9–10)	Guthrie (7–13)	Jenks (24)	2:58	26,263	68–57	−3½	box
126	August 25	Orioles	4–2	Matusz (6–12)	Buehrle (12–10)	Uehara (2)	2:22	23,733	68–58	−3½	box
127	August 26	Orioles	8–0	Jackson (2–0)	Arrieta (4–6)		2:42	23,898	69–58	−3½	box
128	August 27	Yankees	9–4	García (11–5)	Burnett (9–12)		2:51	38,596	70–58	−3½	box
129	August 28	Yankees	12–9	Sabathia (18–5)	Danks (12–9)	Rivera (26)	3:31	38,811	70–59	−4½	box
130	August 29	Yankees	2–1	Nova (1–0)	Floyd (9–11)	Rivera (27)	3:25	39,433	70–60	−4½	box
131	August 30	@ Indians	10–6 (11)	Linebrink (2–1)	Perez (4–1)		4:11	10,663	71–60	−4	box
132	August 31	@ Indians	4–3	Jackson (3–0)	Smith (1–2)	Jenks (25)	2:44	12,006	72–60	–4	box

September/October (16–14) – Home (7–9) – Road (9–5) – 122 R.S. 149 R.A.

#	Date	Opponent	Score	Win	Loss	Save	Time	Att.	Record	GB	Box
133	September 1	@ Indians	6–4	Peña (4–2)	Germano (0–1)	Sale (1)	2:49	12,563	73–60	−4	box
−	September 3	@ Red Sox	Postponed (rain from Hurricane Earl), rescheduled for September 4							−4	
134	September 4	@ Red Sox	3–1	Danks (13–9)	Buchholz (15–6)	Jenks (26)	2:53	37,411	74–60	−4	box
135	September 4	@ Red Sox	3–1	Floyd (10–11)	Lackey (12–9)	Jenks (27)	3:03	37,858	75–60	−3½	box
136	September 5	@ Red Sox	7–5	Linebrink (3–1)	Papelbon (5–6)	Thornton (6)	4:05	37,570	76–60	−3½	box
137	September 6	@ Tigers	5–4 (10)	Sale (1–1)	Valverde (2–4)		3:00	32,924	77–60	−3½	box
138	September 7	@ Tigers	9–1	Verlander (15–8)	García (11–6)		2:52	24,905	77–61	−4½	box
139	September 8	@ Tigers	5–1	Bonderman (8–9)	Danks (13–10)		2:04	25,995	77–62	−5½	box
140	September 9	@ Tigers	6–3	Porcello (9–11)	Floyd (10–12)	Perry (2)	2:12	29,995	77–63	−6	box
141	September 10	Royals	4–3	Putz (7–5)	Tejeda (3–4)	Sale (2)	2:24	27,009	78–63	−5	box
142	September 11	Royals	8–2	Davies (8–9)	Jackson (3–1)		3:07	26,389	78–64	−6	box
143	September 12	Royals	12–6	Santos (2–0)	Humber (1–1)		3:26	23,756	79–64	−6	box
144	September 14	Twins	9–3	Liriano (14–7)	Danks (13–11)		3:00	29,223	79–65	−7	box
145	September 15	Twins	9–3	Duensing (9–2)	Floyd (10–13)		3:04	30,063	79–66	−8	box
146	September 16	Twins	8–5	Pavano (17–11)	Buehrle (12–11)	Capps (13)	3:25	27,180	79–67	−9	box
147	September 17	Tigers	9–2	Scherzer (11–10)	Jackson (3–2)		2:39	28,563	79–68	−9	box
148	September 18	Tigers	6–3	Verlander (17–8)	Santos (2–1)		2:42	27,828	79–69	−10	box
149	September 19	Tigers	9–7 (11)	Weinhardt (2–2)	Santos (2–2)	Schlereth (1)	4:13	25,417	79–70	−10	box
150	September 20	@ Athletics	3–0	Bonser (1–0)	Linebrink (3–2)	Breslow (3)	2:53	10,090	79–71	−11	box
151	September 21	@ Athletics	7–2	Cahill (17–7)	Buehrle (12–12)		2:30	11,158	79–72	−12	box
152	September 22	@ Athletics	4–3	Thornton (4–4)	Ziegler (3–5)	Sale (3)	2:38	16,056	80–72	−12	box
153	September 24	@ Angels	2–1	Thornton (5–4)	Rodney (4–3)		2:31	41,046	81–72	−11	box
154	September 25	@ Angels	6–2	Danks (14–11)	Kazmir (9–15)		2:37	40,758	82–72	−10	box
155	September 26	@ Angels	4–3	Peña (5–2)	Weaver (13–12)	Thornton (7)	2:46	42,686	83–72	−9	box
156	September 27	Red Sox	6–1	Buchholz (17–7)	Buehrle (12–13)		2:42	19,750	83–73	−9	box
157	September 28	Red Sox	5–4	Sale (2–1)	Bowden (0–1)		3:10	16,982	84–73	−8	box
158	September 29	Red Sox	5–2	García (12–6)	Beckett (6–6)	Thornton (8)	2:32	32,084	85–73	−8	box
159	September 30	Red Sox	8–2	Danks (15–11)	Lester (19–9)		2:57	30,854	86–73	−7	box
160	October 1	Indians	7–3	Carmona (13–14)	Peña (5–3)		2:52	23,128	86–74	−7	box
161	October 2	Indians	6–2 (6)	Buehrle (13–13)	Carrasco (2–2)		1:46	23,702	87–74	−7	box
162	October 3	Indians	6–5	Jackson (4–2)	Germano (0–3)	Sale (4)	2:40	24,539	88–74	−6	box

== Player stats ==
=== Batting ===
Note: G = Games played; AB = At bats; R = Runs scored; H = Hits; 2B = Doubles; 3B = Triples; HR = Home runs; RBI = Runs batted in; BB = Base on balls; SO = Strikeouts; AVG = Batting average; SB = Stolen bases

Player	G	AB	R	H	2B	3B	HR	RBI	BB	SO	AVG	SB
Gordon Beckham, 2B	131	444	58	112	25	2	9	49	37	92	.252	4
Mark Buehrle, P	2	5	0	0	0	0	0	0	0	3	.000	0
Ramón Castro, C	37	115	18	32	2	0	8	21	9	26	.278	1
John Danks, P	1	3	0	0	0	0	0	0	0	1	.000	0
Alejandro De Aza, OF	19	30	7	9	3	0	0	2	1	4	.300	2
Tyler Flowers, C	8	11	2	1	0	0	0	0	4	5	.091	0
Gavin Floyd, P	2	4	0	1	0	0	0	0	0	2	.250	0
Freddy García, P	2	5	0	0	0	0	0	0	0	1	.000	0
Andruw Jones, OF, DH	107	278	41	64	12	1	19	48	45	73	.230	9
Paul Konerko, 1B, DH	149	548	89	171	30	1	39	111	72	110	.312	0
Mark Kotsay, DH, 1B, OF	107	327	30	78	17	2	8	31	32	36	.239	1
Brent Lillibridge, 2B, SS, OF	64	98	19	22	5	2	2	16	3	36	.224	5
Donny Lucy, C	7	15	2	5	3	0	1	2	2	3	.333	1
Brent Morel, 3B	21	65	9	15	3	0	3	7	4	17	.231	2
Jayson Nix, 3B, 2B, SS	24	49	3	8	1	0	1	5	7	12	.163	0
Jake Peavy, P	2	7	0	1	0	0	0	0	0	3	.143	0
Juan Pierre, LF	160	651	96	179	18	3	1	47	45	47	.275	68
A. J. Pierzynski, C	128	474	43	128	29	0	9	56	15	39	.270	3
Carlos Quentin, RF, DH	131	453	73	110	25	2	26	87	50	83	.243	2
Alexei Ramírez, SS	156	585	83	165	29	2	18	70	27	82	.282	13
Manny Ramírez, DH	24	69	6	18	1	0	1	2	14	23	.260	0
Alex Ríos, CF	147	567	89	161	29	3	21	88	38	93	.284	34
Mark Teahen, 3B, OF	77	233	31	60	13	2	4	25	25	61	.258	3
Dayán Viciedo, 3B	38	104	17	32	7	0	5	13	2	25	.308	1
Omar Vizquel, 3B, 2B, SS	108	344	36	95	11	1	2	30	34	45	.276	11
Team totals	162	5484	752	1467	263	21	177	710	462	918	.268	160

=== Pitching ===
Note: W = Wins; L = Losses; ERA = Earned run average; G = Games pitched; GS = Games started; SV = Saves; IP = Innings pitched; H = Hits allowed; R = Runs allowed; ER = Earned runs allowed; HR = Home runs allowed; BB = Walks allowed; K = Strikeouts; BAA = Batting average against

Player	W	L	ERA	G	GS	SV	IP	H	R	ER	HR	BB	K	BAA
Mark Buehrle	13	13	4.28	33	33	0	210.1	246	105	100	17	49	99	.295
John Danks	15	11	3.72	32	32	0	213.0	189	93	88	18	70	163	.237
Gavin Floyd	10	13	4.08	31	31	0	187.1	199	92	85	14	58	151	.274
Freddy García	12	6	4.64	28	28	0	157.0	171	85	81	23	45	89	.279
Lucas Harrell	1	0	4.88	8	3	0	24.0	34	18	12	2	17	15	.337
Daniel Hudson	1	1	6.32	3	3	0	15.2	17	11	11	1	11	14	.293
Gregory Infante	0	0	0.00	5	0	0	4.2	2	0	0	0	4	5	.133
Edwin Jackson	4	2	3.24	11	11	0	75.0	73	31	27	8	18	77	.248
Bobby Jenks	1	3	4.44	55	0	27	52.2	54	28	26	3	18	61	.260
Scott Linebrink	3	2	4.40	52	0	0	57.1	59	31	28	11	17	52	.262
Jeffrey Marquez	0	0	18.00	1	0	0	1.0	2	2	2	1	0	0	.400
Jake Peavy	7	6	4.63	17	17	0	107.0	98	55	55	13	34	93	.242
Tony Peña	5	3	5.10	52	3	0	100.2	108	63	57	10	45	56	.278
J. J. Putz	7	5	2.83	60	0	3	54.0	41	18	17	4	15	65	.204
Chris Sale	2	1	1.93	21	0	4	23.1	15	5	5	2	10	32	.185
Sergio Santos	2	2	2.96	56	0	1	51.2	53	18	17	2	26	56	.261
Matt Thornton	5	4	2.67	61	0	8	60.2	41	18	18	3	20	81	.191
Erick Threets	0	0	0.00	11	0	0	12.1	9	1	0	0	3	6	.220
Carlos Torres	0	1	8.56	5	1	0	13.2	23	13	13	2	9	13	.377
Randy Williams	0	1	5.40	27	0	0	25.0	37	17	15	2	21	22	.346
Team totals	88	74	4.09	162	162	43	1446.1	1471	704	658	136	490	1149	.264

=== Roster ===
2010 Chicago White Sox
Roster
Pitchers: 56 Mark Buehrle; 50 John Danks; 34 Gavin Floyd; 43 Freddy García; 58 Lucas Harrell; 41 Daniel Hudson; 47 Gregory Infante; 33 Edwin Jackson; 45 Bobby Jenks; 71 Scott Linebrink; 48 Jeff Marquez; 44 Jake Peavy; 57 Tony Peña; 40 J. J. Putz; 49 Chris Sale; 46 Sergio Santos; 37 Matt Thornton; 68 Erick Threets; 52 Carlos Torres; 49,67 Randy Williams	Catchers: 27 Ramón Castro; 17 Tyler Flowers; 55 Donny Lucy; 12 A. J. Pierzynski; Infielders: 15 Gordon Beckham; 14 Paul Konerko; 7 Mark Kotsay; 18 Brent Lillibridge; 22 Brent Morel; 5 Jayson Nix; 10 Alexei Ramírez; 23 Mark Teahen; 24 Dayán Viciedo; 11 Omar Vizquel; Outfielders: 30 Alejandro De Aza; 25 Andruw Jones; 20 Carlos Quentin; 1 Juan Pierre; 51 Alex Ríos; Other batters: 99 Manny Ramirez	Manager: 13 Ozzie Guillén; Coaches: 3 Harold Baines (first base); 21 Don Cooper (pitching); 28 Joey Cora (bench); 8 Jeff Cox (third base); 36 Juan Nieves (bullpen); 29 Greg Walker (hitting)

== Farm system ==
Level	Team	League	Manager
AAA	Charlotte Knights	International League	Chris Chambliss
AA	Birmingham Barons	Southern League	Ever Magallanes
A	Winston-Salem Dash	Carolina League	Joe McEwing
A	Kannapolis Intimidators	South Atlantic League	Ernie Young
Rookie	Bristol White Sox	Appalachian League	Ryan Newman
Rookie	Great Falls Voyagers	Pioneer League	Chris Cron
