= Bryan Bullington =

American baseball player (born 1980)

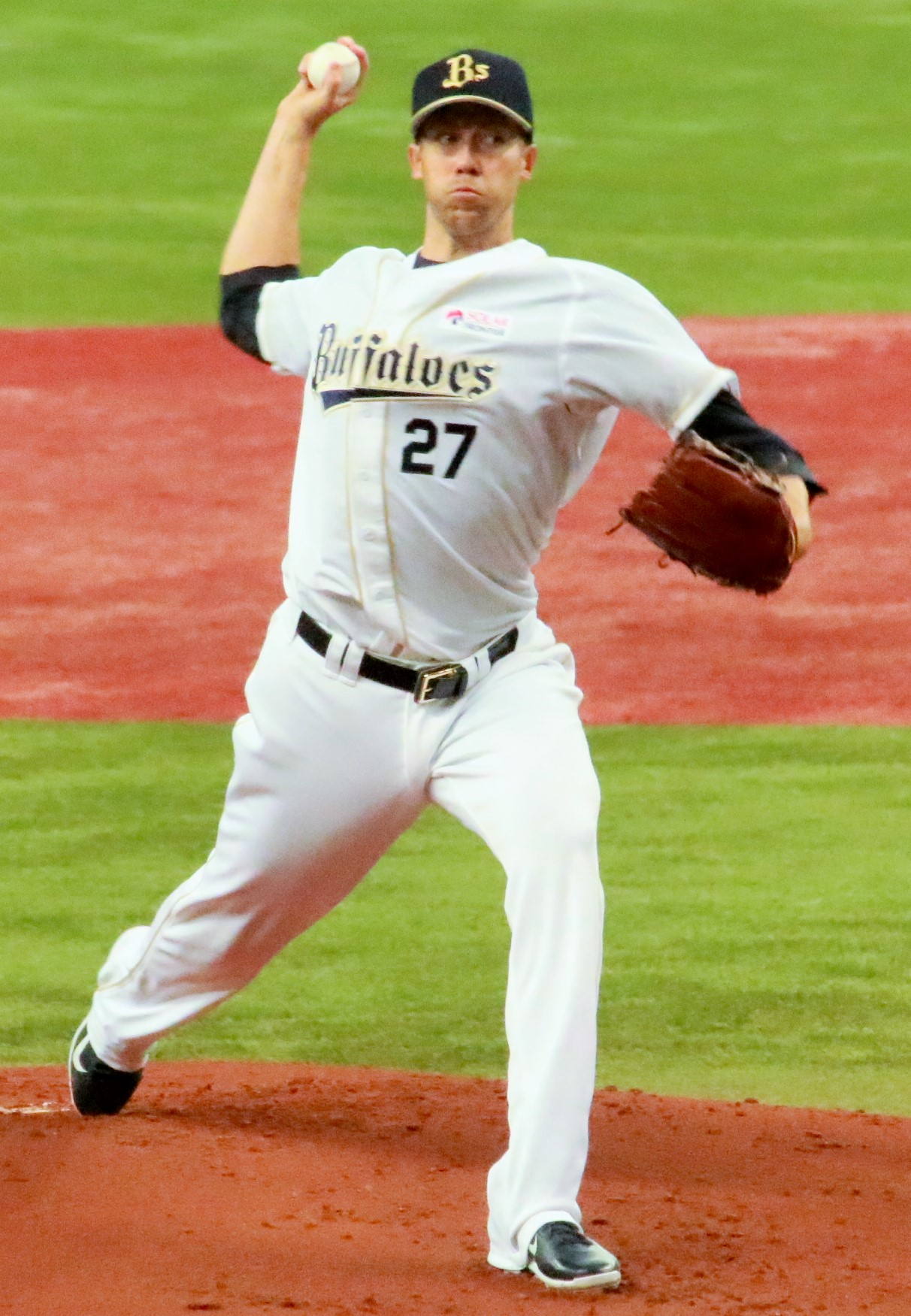
- Bullington with the Orix Buffaloes in 2015
- Pitcher
- Born: September 30, 1980 (age 44); Indianapolis, Indiana, U.S.
- Batted: Right Threw: Right

Professional debut
- MLB: September 18, 2005, for the Pittsburgh Pirates
- NPB: April 14, 2011, for the Hiroshima Toyo Carp

Last appearance
- MLB: September 25, 2010, for the Kansas City Royals
- NPB: October 1, 2015, for the Orix Buffaloes

MLB statistics
- Win–loss record: 1–9
- Earned run average: 5.62
- Strikeouts: 54

NPB statistics
- Win–loss record: 45–45
- Earned run average: 3.25
- Strikeouts: 521
- Stats at Baseball Reference

Teams
- Pittsburgh Pirates (2005, 2007); Cleveland Indians (2008); Toronto Blue Jays (2009); Kansas City Royals (2010); Hiroshima Toyo Carp (2011–2014); Orix Buffaloes (2015)

Career highlights and awards
- NPB All-Star (2011)

Bryan Paul Bullington (born September 30, 1980) is an American former professional baseball pitcher. Bullington was the first overall selection in the 2002 Major League Baseball draft. In Major League Baseball (MLB), he played for the Pittsburgh Pirates, Cleveland Indians, Toronto Blue Jays, and Kansas City Royals. He also played in Nippon Professional Baseball for the Hiroshima Carp and the Orix Buffaloes.

== High school career ==
During his senior year at Madison Consolidated High School, Bullington was 15–0, and pitched a one-hit game to win the 1999 Indiana High School Athletic Association Baseball State Finals. Bullington was named Mr. Baseball for the state of Indiana in 1999; an award presented annually to the best high school baseball player in Indiana. Bullington was drafted in the 37th round (1,111th overall) of the 1999 Major League Baseball draft by the Kansas City Royals, but decided not to sign and attended college instead. He was recruited by Ball State, Purdue, Evansville, and Indiana.

== College career ==
=== 2000 ===
Bullington decided to follow both his parents and older sister in attending Ball State. During his freshman season, an injury to staff ace Justin Wechsler allowed Bullington to become the Friday night starter. He went 9–4 with a 3.83 ERA during his freshman year, tallying a Mid-American Conference season-high 99 strikeouts. He was named the MAC Freshman of the Year and received first-team all-conference honors.

=== 2001 ===
With Bullington atop the rotation, the Cardinals put together a great 2001 season, going 21–5 in the Mid-American Conference and winning the regular season title. Bullington went 9–3 during the regular season with a conference-best 3.01 ERA, and was honored as a unanimous choice for MAC's Pitcher of the Year, becoming the first Cardinal to win the award. Bullington started the Cardinals opening game of the conference tournament against Miami University, but was removed in the first inning after being struck in the face by a line drive off the bat of Brady Nori. The Cardinals were upset by the RedHawks 13–5. Despite his injury, Bullington came back and pitched 3 days later in their semi-final game against Kent State. He was tagged for 10 hits and seven earned runs over six innings, taking the loss and eliminating the Cardinals from the tournament. Despite his rough finish, he ended the season with a 9–4 record and a 3.50 ERA. Most notably, his 119 strikeouts on the season led the conference once again and broke Ball State's all-time single season strikeout record. He went on to pitch for the U.S. National Team that summer.

=== 2002 ===
Coming into his junior season, Bullington was touted as one of the best collegiate pitchers in the country. In his third start of the season, he tossed 8 strong innings in a winning effort over the defending National Champion and 17th ranked Miami Hurricanes. On May 3, Bullington struck out a career-high 15 batters against Eastern Michigan, surpassing Bob Owchinko for the most career strikeouts in MAC history. He allowed only five hits and a run over eight innings en route to his ninth win of the season. He finished the regular season with a 10–2 mark and a conference-best 2.11 ERA. Bullington and the Cardinals were seeded fourth in the conference tournament and slated to face Kent State in their opening game. However, for the second consecutive year, the Golden Flashes had Bullington's number in the tournament, scoring six runs off him in the first inning on their way to a 13–4 win. The Cardinals went on to advance to the championship, where they met undefeated Kent State again three days later. In an effort to avoid a repeat of the first game, Coach Rich Maloney chose to bring Bullington out of the bullpen in relief. Bullington entered the game in the fourth inning and allowed five earned runs over six innings. Despite the rough outing, it was enough to earn him his career-high 11th win of the season, thanks to 16 runs of support. Bullington finished 11–3 with a conference-best ERA of 2.86 for the year, and broke his own single season strikeout record with 139 strikeouts. He finished the season leading the MAC in wins, ERA, strikeouts, and innings pitched for the 2002 season. He recorded double-digit strikeouts in eight of his starts. He was once again named the MAC's Pitcher of the Year, becoming the first player to win the honor in consecutive seasons, and received first-team all-conference honors for the third consecutive season. Nationally, he was unanimously recognized as a First-Team All-American and named a finalist for the Dick Howser Trophy. After being drafted first overall, he decided to forgo his senior season and sign with the Pittsburgh Pirates. He left Ball State as the winningest pitcher in school history. He still holds the school records for most career wins (29), most single-season strikeouts (139), most career strikeouts (357), and tied for most single-season wins (11). As of 2012, he holds the Mid-American Conference record in career strikeouts and single-season strikeouts. He is one of only twelve players to be named first-team All-MAC for three consecutive seasons. In 2010, the Ball State Daily News named Bullington the third best athlete to come from the school since 1990.

== Professional career ==
Bullington was the first overall pick in the 2002 Major League Baseball draft by the Pittsburgh Pirates. The selection by the Pirates was widely viewed as a signability selection, as the Pirates felt they had a better chance of signing him over other top players in the draft. Then-general manager Dave Littlefield said of the selection: "There was quite a bit of discussion on where we were going to go. It wasn't a situation where we were trying to be crafty. It was more a situation that it wasn't a year where it was one player standing above anybody else, and we felt we had to consider a lot of different factors. We feel very comfortable and good about drafting Bullington.""Being a college pitcher, he's going to be a little closer than a high school draftee...I'd anticipate we're looking at him a couple of years away."

Bullington was the first player from the Mid-American Conference to be selected with the first pick in a major sport's draft. On October 30, 2002, Bullington signed a minor league deal with the Pirates, which included a $4 million signing bonus.

=== 2003 ===
Before ever throwing a professional pitch, Bullington was ranked as the 52nd-best prospect in baseball coming into the 2003 season by Baseball America. The Pirates assigned him to their Class–A affiliate, the Hickory Crawdads, and he appeared in eight games (seven starts) for them, going 5–1 with a 1.39 ERA over 45 1/3 innings before being promoted to the Advanced-A Lynchburg Hillcats. He made 17 starts with Lynchburg, going 8–4 with a 3.05 ERA. Bullington combined for a 13–5 record and a 2.52 ERA over 142 2/3 innings.

=== 2004 ===
Bullington was ranked the 97th-best prospect in baseball by Baseball America coming into the 2004 season. He was assigned to the Pirates' Double–A affiliate, the Altoona Curve, and in his first 17 starts, he went 6–5 with a 3.89 ERA, earning him a spot in the Eastern League All-Star Game. Bullington was also named to the United States squad for the 2004 Futures Game, where he pitched a scoreless sixth inning. He went 6–2 for the rest of the season before being shut down. Bullington finished the season 12–7 with a 4.10 ERA in 26 starts.

=== 2005–2006 ===
Bullington was promoted to the Pirates' Triple–A affiliate, the Indianapolis Indians, at the beginning of the 2005 season. He began the season on the disabled list with right shoulder tendinitis. He made 18 starts with Indianapolis, going 9–5 with a 3.38 ERA. On September 16, the Pirates called Bullington up to the major leagues, along with José Bautista, Matt Capps, Tom Gorzelanny, and Ronny Paulino. On September 18, he made his major league debut against the Cincinnati Reds, relieving starting pitcher Óliver Pérez in the third inning with two outs. He pitched 1 1/3 innings, allowing a hit, a walk, a hit by pitch, and two earned runs. Bullington didn't pitch again for the remainder of the season. Shortly afterwards, it was announced that he would have surgery on his throwing shoulder. On October 17, Bullington had the surgery to repair damage to his labrum in his right throwing shoulder. Then-GM Dave Littlefield said of the surgery, "There was a little more damage than they [initially] thought." As a result of the surgery, he missed the entire 2006 season.

=== 2007 ===
Shoulder problems
Indianapolis (Triple–A)	Starts	W-L Record	ERA
Before June 10	12	9–2	2.75
After June 10	13	2–7	5.21

Bullington returned to Triple–A Indianapolis for the 2007 season. He started off hot, going 4–0 with a 1.17 ERA over his first five starts, and was named Indianapolis's Player of the Month for April. In his next seven starts, he went 5–2 with a 3.83 ERA. On June 10, Bullington left a game after pitching only one inning due to shoulder discomfort, and was placed on the 15-day disabled list. He made his next start on June 25, where he got hit around for six earned runs in only 2 1/3 innings. Bullington led the International League with 10 wins at the all-star break, and sported a 4.04 ERA with 49 strikeouts and 37 walks over 89 innings. He was named the starting pitcher for the International League in the Triple-A All-Star Game, where he gave up two earned runs over two innings, and was named the winning pitcher in the game after his team scored four runs in the first inning and never surrendered the lead. He made ten more starts to finish out his minor league season, struggling to a 1–5 record with a 3.94 ERA over the stretch. Despite his rough finish, he was named the Indians' Comeback Player of the Year. He finished the season 11–9 with a 4.00 ERA, and led the team in wins (11), starts (26), and innings pitched (150 2/3). The Pirates called up Bullington as a part of their September call-ups on September 3. He made five appearances (three starts), going 0–3 with a 5.29 ERA.

=== 2008 ===
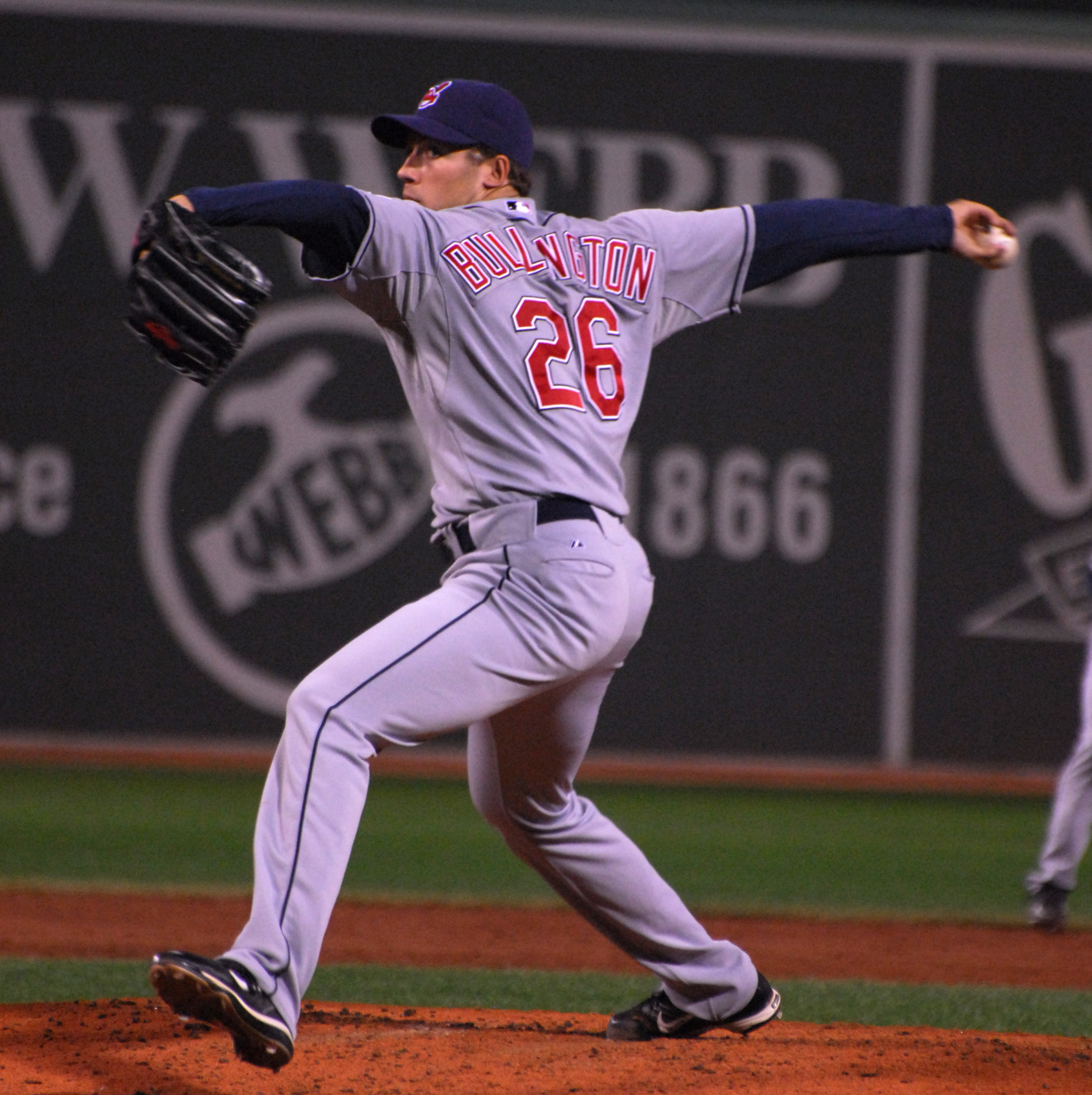
Bullington pitching for the Cleveland Indians in 2008

Bullington was placed on the Pirates' 40-man roster and attended Spring training. On March 17, he was optioned to Triple-A Indianapolis. He got off to a bad start, going 1–6 with a 6.95 ERA over his first nine starts. However, he bounced back in his next two, going 2–0 with a 1.38 ERA on his way to being named the International League Pitcher of the Week. On May 29, the Pirates recalled him to the majors. However, he didn't pitch in a major league game. On June 13, Bullington was optioned back to Indianapolis. On July 3, the Pirates announced that they were designating Bullington for assignment to make room on their 40-man roster for Chris Duffy. When asked about the move, Bullington said, "I really appreciate everything the Pirates have done for me, but I feel like a fresh start with another organization wouldn't be such a bad thing at this point." Bullington finished the first half of the season with a 4–6 record and a 5.52 ERA over 15 starts with Indianapolis.

On July 10, the Cleveland Indians claimed Bullington off waivers and assigned him to their Triple–A affiliate, the Buffalo Bisons. He made 10 appearances (eight starts) for Buffalo, compiling a 1–3 record with a 4.75 ERA and recorded his first professional save. On September 8, Bullington was called up to the Indians after injuries to their starting rotation left them shorthanded. Bullington made three appearances (two starts) for the Indians, going 0–2 with a 4.91 ERA. Soon after the end of the season, he was designated for assignment and claimed off waivers by the Toronto Blue Jays.

=== 2009 ===
2009 Monthly Breakdown
Las Vegas (Triple–A)	Innings	W–L Record	ERA	WHIP	Strikeouts	Walks	Holds	Saves
April	9 2/3	1–1	1.86	1.20	10	1	1	-
May	15 2/3	1–0	6.32	1.71	18	3	3	-
June	13	1–0	1.38	0.92	15	3	3	3

Bullington reported to Spring training with the Blue Jays, and on March 3, the Blue Jays outrighted him to their Triple–A affiliate, the Las Vegas 51s. After Spring training, when asked about his time in Buffalo, Bullington said, "Pitching coach Scott Radinsky had me drop my arm slot, and I got back to where I was in college, feeling more comfortable and getting some more action on the ball. I carried that into the spring this year, and I like the way the ball's coming out of my hand." Bullington was moved to the bullpen as a long reliever for the 51s and served as a spot-starter. Bullington made four relief appearances for Las Vegas in April, going 1–1 with a 1.86 ERA. On April 23, Bullington's contract was purchased by Toronto after B. J. Ryan was placed on the disabled list with shoulder soreness. He made four appearances, including three scoreless outings, for the Blue Jays. On April 30, Bullington was demoted back to Las Vegas, and was outrighted on May 6. He made twenty-four more relief appearances for the 51s over May and June before being placed on the disabled list for undisclosed reasons. He stayed on the disabled list for the remainder of the season, and finished the season 3–1 with seven holds, three saves, and a 3.52 ERA in 28 relief appearances with Las Vegas. After the season, the Blue Jays chose not to re-sign him and he became a free agent.

On November 24, the Kansas City Royals signed him to a minor league contract for the 2010 season.

=== 2010 ===
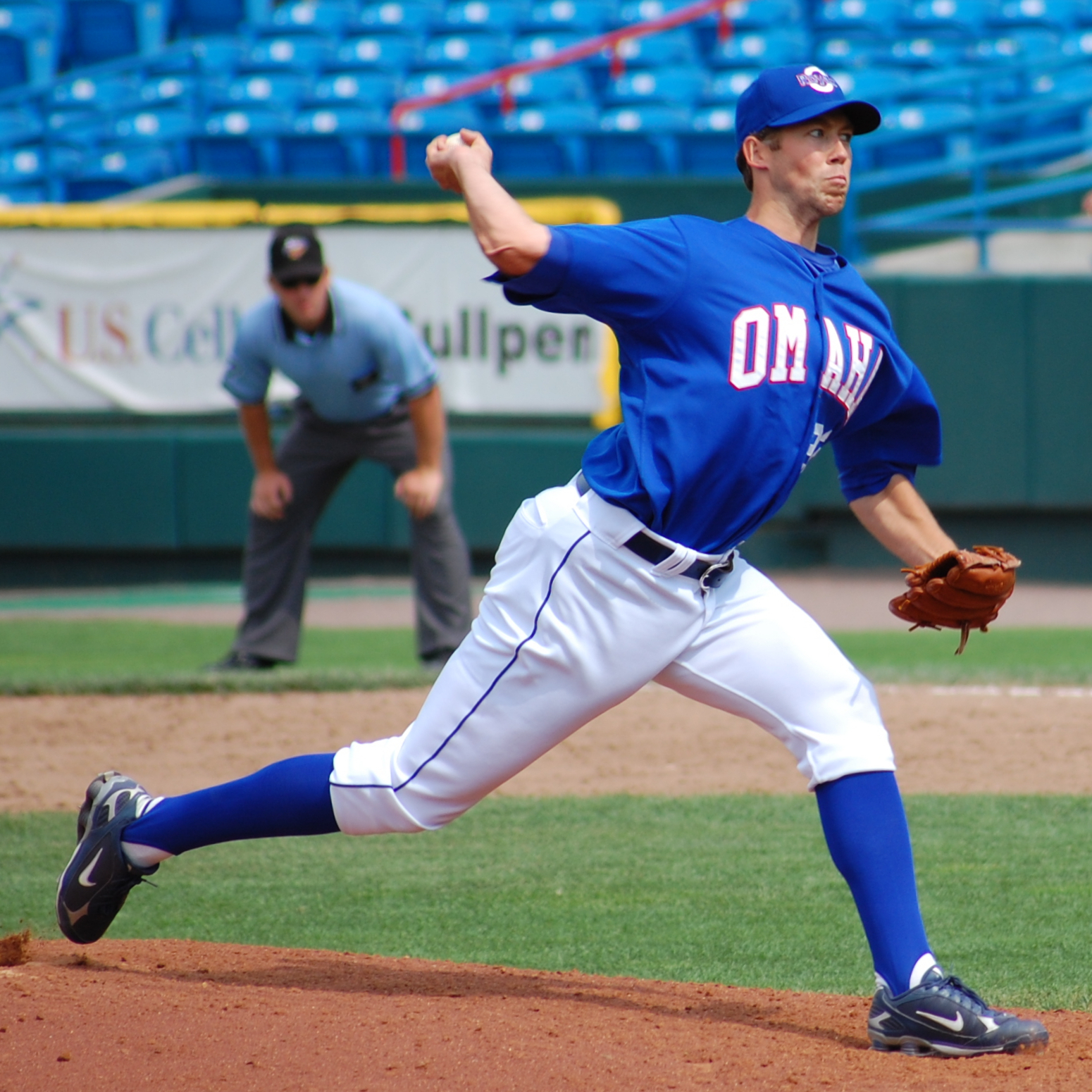
Bullington pitching for the Omaha Royals, triple-A affiliates of the Kansas City Royals, in 2010

Bullington reported to camp with the Kansas City Royals for Spring training, where they moved him back into his original role as a starter. He made five starts in Spring training, pitching nine innings and giving up five runs. On March 28, Bullington was reassigned to minor league camp and started the season with their Triple-A affiliate, the Omaha Royals. He began the season in Omaha's starting rotation, but was moved to the bullpen after one start to make room for Anthony Lerew. He made two relief appearances before being moved back into the starting rotation in late April after Bruce Chen was promoted to the majors. He made seven appearances (five starts) in total for Omaha, going 2–0 with a 1.71 ERA, before being called up to Kansas City.

On May 16, the Royals purchased Bullington's contract and called him up to work out of the bullpen. His first stint with Kansas City was brief, making only three appearances before being sent back down to Omaha on May 25. Bullington threw two scoreless relief outings for Omaha before rejoining their rotation in early June. He made 13 appearances (10 starts) for Omaha after his demotion, going 6–2 with a 3.60 ERA. In total, Bullington finished his Triple-A season 8–2 with a 2.82 ERA in 20 games (15 starts). He made 11 quality starts, including his last four starts in a row. His 2.82 ERA and 1.12 WHIP would have led the Pacific Coast League, but he came up 13 1/3 innings short of qualifying. He was named Omaha's Pitcher of the Year.

On July 28, the Royals recalled Bullington to work out of the bullpen again. He pitched in that afternoon's game against the Minnesota Twins, coming into the game in the seventh inning and pitching two scoreless innings. He made another relief appearance on August 2 against the Oakland Athletics, pitching two more scoreless innings. On August 6, the Royals announced Bullington would replace the struggling Brian Bannister in the starting rotation, and would make his first start of the year on August 10 against the Los Angeles Angels of Anaheim. Bullington threw six innings of three-run ball, walking one and striking out four in a losing effort. Manager Ned Yost liked what he saw from Bullington though, saying, "He really got after them and gave us a shot to win the ballgame, and I'll give him another chance. We backed Brian Bannister up another start and just give him a chance to keep working and give Bully a little bit of a shot." Bullington made his next start on August 15 against the New York Yankees, where he threw eight innings of shutout ball. He allowed only two hits and earned his first and only Major League victory.

August 15, 2010 1:10 PM at Kauffman Stadium
Team	1	2	3	4	5	6	7	8	9	R	H	E
New York Yankees	0	0	0	0	0	0	0	0	0	0	2	3
Kansas City Royals	1	0	0	0	0	0	0	0	0	1	4	0
WP: Bryan Bullington LP: A. J. Burnett Sv: Joakim Soria; Attendance: 26,012; Boxscore

Bullington said after the start, "This is a good day, that's for sure. It was a lot of fun, a long time in coming, and I really enjoyed it. At times there were days in Triple–A where it felt like I was never going to get another shot. I'm 29 years old and I'm to the point where I don't want to kick around in Triple–A for another four or five years. If I'm going to do this, I want to do it now." "I've had a few brief (major league) stints, but this is the first time I myself believe I belong here and can pitch at this level."

Bullington made three more starts from that point on, struggling to an 0–2 mark and a 10.67 ERA. Bullington was moved back to the bullpen as a long reliever for September when two regular starters returned from the disabled list. He made three appearances out of the bullpen in September, allowing five runs over 7 1/3 innings. He finished the year 1–4 with a 6.12 ERA in 13 games (five starts) for Kansas City. On November 24, the Royals placed Bullington on unconditional release waivers, freeing him to sign with the Hiroshima Toyo Carp of Japan's Central League.

Years later, Bullington would say of his only major league win: "I remember they told me I was done after eight, and just going into the tunnel for a second before I came back out to watch the ninth. It just kind of sits with you, if I never get this opportunity again or this is it, it's certainly worth it."

=== 2011 ===
Bullington signed a one-year, $650,000 contract, with a team option for a second year, and reported to spring camp with the Carp. When asked why he decided to come to Japan, he said "The last few years I had to start the season from the minors and wait for a players at the MLB level to have a bad streak or get injured. As a minor league, you do a lot of traveling and sometimes you need to move a lot. In Japan I can stay in one place and focus on baseball. And I also get to experience a new culture. Actually, there were a number of NPB clubs that contacted me during the season last year. That helped my family prepare for this year. And when I got an offer from Hiroshima, I jumped on it. My wife supports this decision." He began his Japanese career 3–0 with a 1.96 ERA and one complete game in three starts during April, earning him the Nihon Seimei Most Valuable Pitcher in the Central League for the month of April. He went 9–4 with a 2.06 ERA in the first half, earning him a spot in the 2011 NPB All-Star Series. He pitched two innings in Game 3 of the series, allowing two hits, one being a solo home run to Takahiro Okada, and struck out one. Making 30 starts in his first season with the Carp, Bullington finished the season 13–11 with a 2.42 ERA over 204 1/3 innings. His 2.42 ERA was the sixth lowest ERA in the Central League among eligible pitchers. He set numerous career bests, and threw over 200 innings for the first time in his career, turning in the best season of his career. On his first season in Japan, Bullington said "I'm thinking that I'd like to stay with the Carp. If the team needs me, then I need the Carp. I like it here in Japan; my family does as well." Hiroshima re-signed him in the offseason to a one-year contract worth $1,744,300.

=== 2012 ===
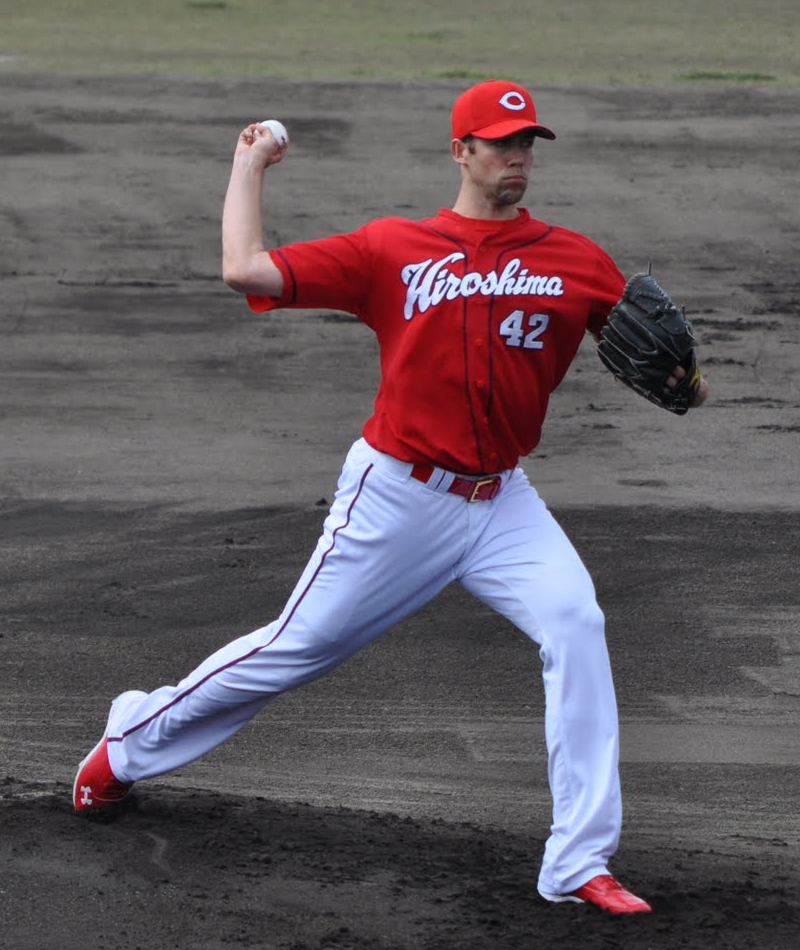
Bullington during his tenure with the Hiroshima Toyo Carp in 2012

Bullington broke camp with the club as the number two starter on the team. His first half was up and down, reaching double digit strikeouts on four occasions, but allowing a 5.55 ERA from the middle of May to the All-Star Break. He was 5–9 with a 4.04 ERA entering the All-Star Break. Bullington proved more consistent in the second half though, reeling off 8 consecutive quality starts after the break, and 11 total quality starts. He finished the second half 2–5 with a 2.15 ERA, and in total, finished the 2012 season 7–14 with a 3.23 ERA and 137 strikeouts over 175 2/3 innings. The 137 strikeouts were a career best, beating his previous season's total by one. His record was marred by a lack of run support, receiving a no-decision or loss in 13 of his 19 quality starts. On December 11, the Carp announced that they had re-signed Bullington to a two-year deal worth approximately $1.25 million plus incentives per year. The contract included a $500,000 signing bonus.

=== 2013 ===
Bullington entered camp once again as the number two in the rotation behind Kenta Maeda. On March 22, the Carp announced Bullington would get the opening day start to give Maeda extra rest after pitching in the World Baseball Classic. On April 29, Bullington made news in the United States for throwing behind Hanshin Tigers batter Ryota Arai. As Bullington started his wind-up, while standing in the batter's box, Arai appealed to Bullington for time. The umpire granted time as the pitch was being released. Bullington finished the first half at 4–7 with a 2.70 ERA and a 0.97 WHIP over 17 starts.

Bullington got off to a bad start in the second half, giving up 11 runs in his first two starts. He kept his head above water in August, posting a 3–0 record despite a 4.30 ERA. On August 31, he was removed from his start against the Hanshin Tigers in the second inning after being struck by a pitch in his left knee. He was able to make his next start a week later, where he shutout the Yokohama DeNA BayStars over seven innings. He continued his hot pitching through September, defeating both the Yomiuri Giants and the Hanshin Tigers in his next two starts as the Carp chased a playoff spot. His victory against the Giants on September 14 was his 30th victory with the Carp, passing Nate Minchey for most organizational wins by a foreign player.

On September 25, Bullington got the start against the Chunichi Dragons as the Carp looked to clinch a playoff spot for the first time in 23 years. Bullington threw seven innings of shutout ball, allowing only four hits, and former farmhand teammate Brad Eldred backed him with a two-run shot in the top of the eighth inning to give Bullington the win.

Bullington made 11 starts in the second half, finishing 7–2 with a 4.25 ERA. He went 4–0 with a 1.00 ERA in the month of September, earning him the Nihon Seimei Most Valuable Pitcher for the Central League for the month of September. He became the first foreign player in Carp history and the fourth foreign player in Central League history to win the award multiple times (2). He finished the season 11–9 with a 3.23 ERA, a 1.13 WHIP, and 117 strikeouts over 172 2/3 innings.

On October 13, Bullington was given the ball to start Game 2 of the first stage of the Climax Series against the Hanshin Tigers. He threw five innings of one-hit ball, allowing only a leadoff homerun to Tsuyoshi Nishioka in the bottom of the first inning. Bullington received the winning decision and the Carp advanced to the second stage.

=== 2014 ===
Despite concern from Manager Kenjiro Nomura over poor performance in the preseason, Bullington got his fourth season with the Carp off to a great start. In his first 11 starts, he threw nine quality starts, posting a 7–4 record, a 2.93 ERA, and a 54/12 K/BB ratio over that span. Things took a considerable turn for the worse after that though, posting an ERA above 6 in both June and August. On August 20, Hiroshima announced that Bullington would be removed from the roster for 10 days of rest after giving up seven earned runs in three innings against the Yokohama DeNA BayStars. He made his next start 11 days later on August 31 against the Chunichi Dragons, but was pulled in the fifth inning after complaining of arm stiffness. Bullington was diagnosed the next day with neuritis in his ulnar nerve, also known as inflammation of the funny bone, and was shut down for the rest of the season. He finished the season 9–8 with a 4.58 ERA over 131 2/3 innings.

Hiroshima chose not to re-sign him in the offseason. Bullington received attention from both the Orix Buffaloes and the Tokyo Yakult Swallows. On December 6, Bullington signed a one-year deal with Orix for ¥150 million (roughly US$1.2 million) for the upcoming season.

=== 2015 ===
Bullington was taken off of the active roster with shoulder discomfort after leaving the game on May 20, lasting only 2 1/3 innings. He finished the season with a 5–3 record and a 3.30 ERA in 14 starts.
