= Sean O'Sullivan (baseball) =

American baseball player (born 1987)

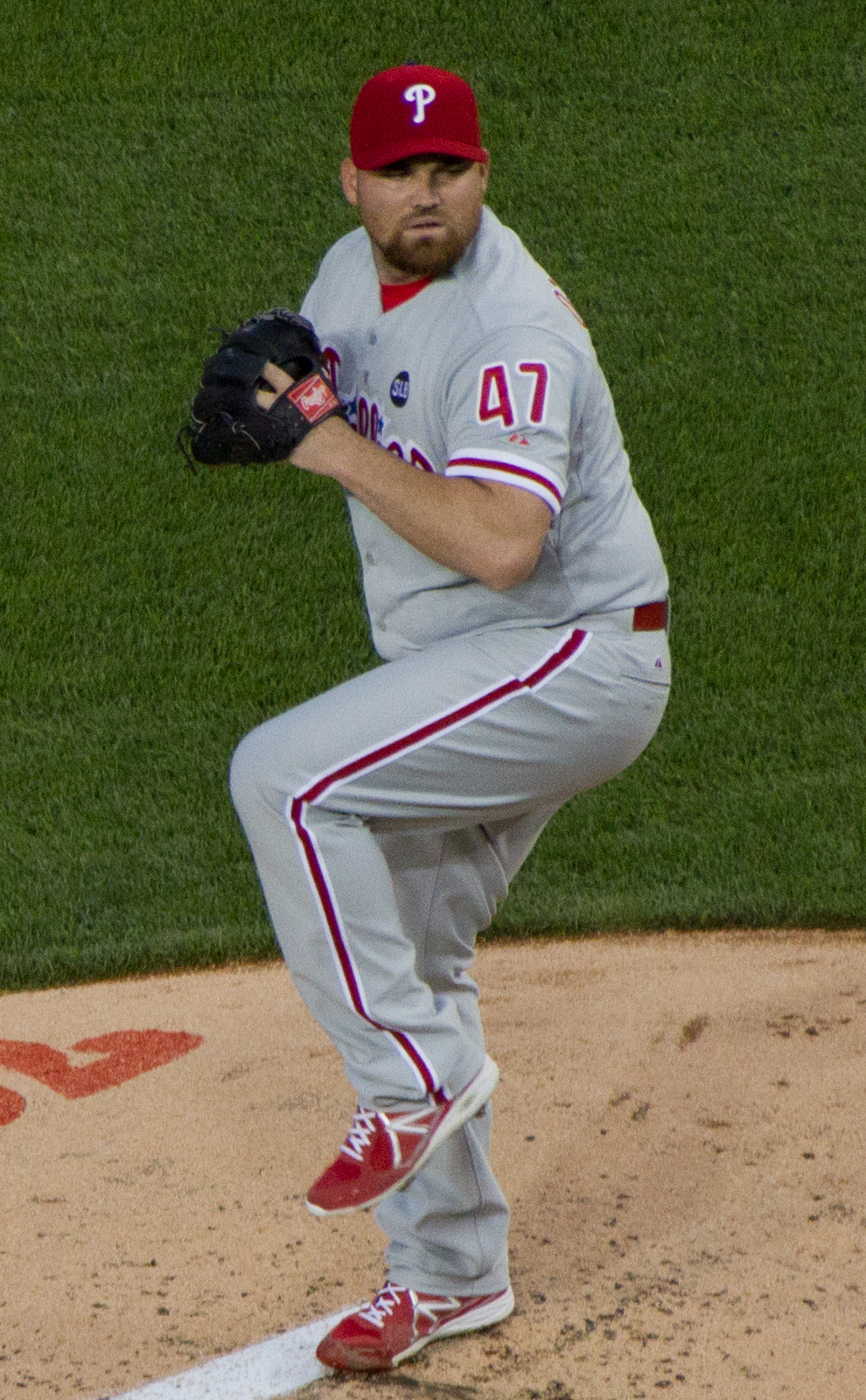
- O'Sullivan with the Philadelphia Phillies
- Pitcher
- Born: September 1, 1987 (age 38); San Diego, California, U.S.
- Batted: Right Threw: Right

Professional debut
- MLB: June 16, 2009, for the Los Angeles Angels of Anaheim
- KBO: April 1, 2017, for the Nexen Heroes

Last appearance
- MLB: July 8, 2016, for the Boston Red Sox
- KBO: April 14, 2017, for the Nexen Heroes

MLB statistics
- Win–loss record: 13–23
- Earned run average: 6.01
- Strikeouts: 158

KBO statistics
- Win–loss record: 0–2
- Earned run average: 15.75
- Strikeouts: 6
- Stats at Baseball Reference

Teams
- Los Angeles Angels of Anaheim (2009–2010); Kansas City Royals (2010–2011); San Diego Padres (2013); Philadelphia Phillies (2014–2015); Boston Red Sox (2016); Nexen Heroes (2017)
Medals
Men's baseball
Representing United States
World Youth Baseball Championship
Gold medal – first place	2003 Kaohsiung	Team

Sean Daniel O'Sullivan (born September 1, 1987) is an American former professional baseball pitcher. He played in Major League Baseball (MLB) for the Los Angeles Angels of Anaheim, Kansas City Royals, San Diego Padres, Philadelphia Phillies, and Boston Red Sox and in the KBO League for the Nexen Heroes.

== Amateur & college career ==
O'Sullivan played baseball for Valhalla High School (El Cajon, California), near San Diego. In 2004, he went 11–1, with his only loss to El Capitan High School (in Lakeside, California) in the finals of the California Interscholastic Federation San Diego Section championship. He claimed the East County Californian Pitcher of the Year and Player of the Year awards that season.

O'Sullivan played college baseball for the Grossmont College Griffins, near his hometown.

== Minor league career ==
O'Sullivan was drafted by the Los Angeles Angels of Anaheim in the third round of the 2005 MLB draft. He began his pro career with the Rookie-level Orem Owlz of the Pioneer League (baseball) in 2006. He compiled a 4–0 win–loss record with a 2.14 ERA in 71.1 innings pitched, and was selected a post-season All-Star. He was promoted in 2007 to the Class A Cedar Rapids Kernels of the Midwest League, where he pitched 158.1 innings, had a 10–7 win–loss record and a 2.22 ERA. O'Sullivan played in 2008 for the Rancho Cucamonga Quakes of the California League (Advanced Class A), and was 16–8 in 158.0 innings with a 4.73 ERA; he was a post-season All-Star pick. O'Sullivan began 2009 with the Arkansas Travelers of the Double-A Texas League, where he was 1–2 with a 5.30 ERA in 18.2 innings. He was promoted to the Salt Lake Bees of the Triple-A Pacific Coast League, where he went 6–4 with a 5.48 ERA in 69.0 innings.

== Major league career ==
=== Los Angeles Angels of Anaheim ===
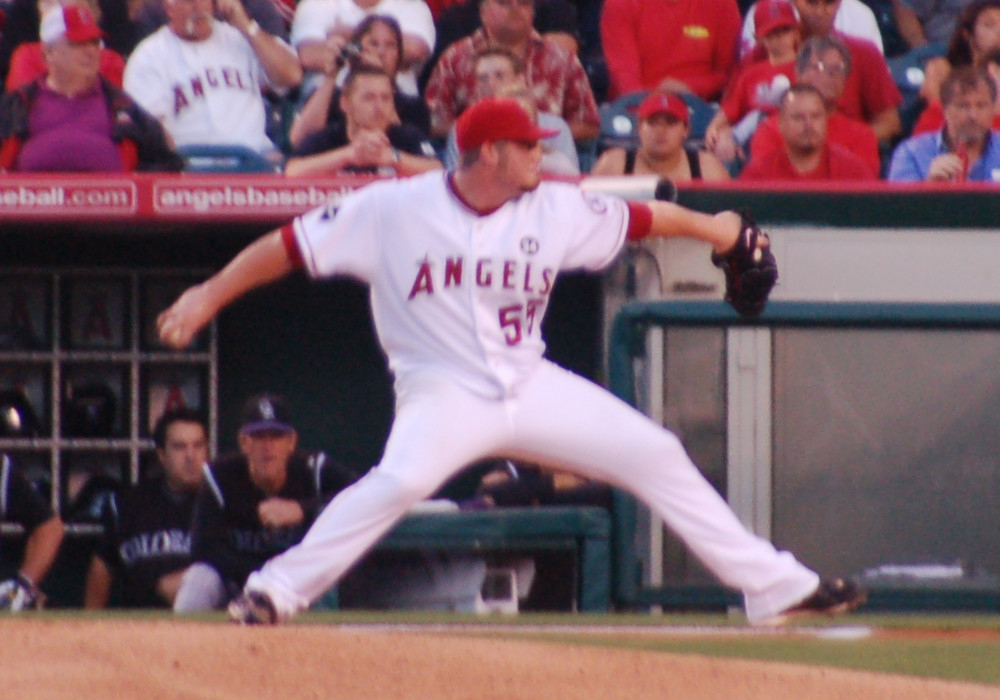
O'Sullivan with the Los Angeles Angels of Anaheim in 2009

O'Sullivan made his major league debut against the San Francisco Giants on June 16, 2009, at AT&T Park, making a spot-start in replacement of the injured Ervin Santana. He won his debut after pitching seven innings, giving up one run on five hits and one walk, and striking out five. After the game, he was optioned back to the Salt Lake Bees of the Pacific Coast League. When Santana was not able to make his next scheduled start on June 23, 2009 and was placed on the 15-day disabled list, O'Sullivan was recalled to the Angels for a second start in which he pitched five plus innings allowing three runs.

After being reassigned to the AAA level, on July 28, 2009, O'Sullivan pitched a no-hitter for the Bees against the Sacramento River Cats. The only baserunner he allowed was via a walk. In 5 games for the Angels in 2010, O’Sullivan posted a 1-0 record and a 2.08 ERA with 6 strikeouts in 13.0 innings pitched.

=== Kansas City Royals ===
On July 22, 2010 he and Will Smith were traded to the Kansas City Royals in exchange for Alberto Callaspo. He finished the year with a 6.11 ERA in 14 appearances for the Royals. O’Sullivan appeared in 12 games for Kansas City in 2011, logging a 2-6 record and 7.25 ERA in 58.1 innings of work.

In April 2012, O'Sullivan failed to make the major league roster and was placed on waivers by the Kansas City Royals. No other major league club acquired his contract and he was subsequently assigned outright to the Royals' AAA team, the Omaha Storm Chasers.

=== Toronto Blue Jays ===
On June 21, 2012, O'Sullivan was traded to the Toronto Blue Jays for cash considerations and assigned to the Triple-A Las Vegas 51s. He registered a 9-3 record and 2.72 ERA in 14 appearances with Las Vegas to end the year. On November 3, 2012, he elected free agency.

=== San Diego Padres ===
O'Sullivan signed a minor league deal with the San Diego Padres on December 11, 2012.

He was assigned to the Triple-A Tucson Padres to begin the year. On July 12, 2013, he was selected to the active roster and made a few spot starts. He also served for a short time in the bullpen. He was designated for assignment on August 19, 2013, and ultimately reassigned to Triple-A Tucson. O'Sullivan finished the 2013 season 0-3 with an earned run average of 3.96. He declared free agency on October 4.

=== Philadelphia Phillies ===
On December 18, 2013, the Philadelphia Phillies announced that they had signed O’Sullivan to a minor league contract that included a spring training invitation. He was assigned to the Triple-A Lehigh Valley IronPigs to begin the year. His contract was selected from Triple-A on June 28 to start the second game of a doubleheader, and he was designated for assignment on June 29. O’Sullivan was again called back up on August 7, but was once again designated for assignment on August 10 to create a roster spot for pitcher Jerome Williams. He was once again promoted on September 5. He was outrighted off the roster on October 6 and subsequently elected free agency. In 3 major league appearances, O’Sullivan struggled to a 6.39 ERA with 7 strikeouts.

On December 16, 2014, O’Sullivan re-signed with the Phillies on a new minor league contract. On April 12, 2015, he was selected to the active roster, but was placed on the disabled list a week and a half later with left knee tendinitis. On July 7, he was activated off of the disabled list and outrighted off of the 40-man roster and assigned outright to Lehigh Valley. In 13 games for the Phillies, he had recorded a 1-6 record and 6.08 ERA. On October 5, 2015, he elected free agency.

=== Boston Red Sox ===
On December 13, 2015, O'Sullivan signed a minor league deal with the Boston Red Sox. He was assigned to the Triple-A Pawtucket Red Sox to begin the season. On May 6, he was selected to the active roster. During his Red Sox debut, he pitched one inning, and had a 9.00 ERA. On May 10, 2016, O'Sullivan had his first Red Sox start, which he won pitching six innings and giving up four earned runs in a 13–5 Red Sox victory. He gave up six earned runs in 4.1 innings pitched against Houston in a 10–9 Red Sox victory, but he was designated for assignment by the team on May 15. On July 3, O’Sullivan was re-added to the active roster, but hit the disabled list with left knee tendinitis a week later. He was activated on August 11 and promptly outrighted off of the 40-man roster to Triple-A Pawtucket. He elected free agency on October 11, 2016.

=== Nexen Heroes ===
On November 24, 2016, O'Sullivan signed a one-year, $1.1 million contract with the Nexen Heroes of the KBO League. On May 3, 2017, O'Sullivan was released by the Heroes after struggling to a 15.75 ERA in 3 appearances.

=== Washington Nationals ===
On May 23, 2017, O’Sullivan signed a minor league contract with the Washington Nationals organization. He was assigned to the Triple-A Syracuse Chiefs, where he logged a 1-2 record and 5.80 ERA in 10 games. He elected free agency following the season on November 6.

=== Southern Maryland Blue Crabs ===
On March 17, 2018, O'Sullivan signed with the Southern Maryland Blue Crabs of the Atlantic League of Professional Baseball. He was released on May 8. In 2 starts 5.1 innings he went 0-2 with an ugly 20.25 ERA with 6 strikeouts.
