= Dusty Hughes (baseball) =

American baseball player (born 1982)

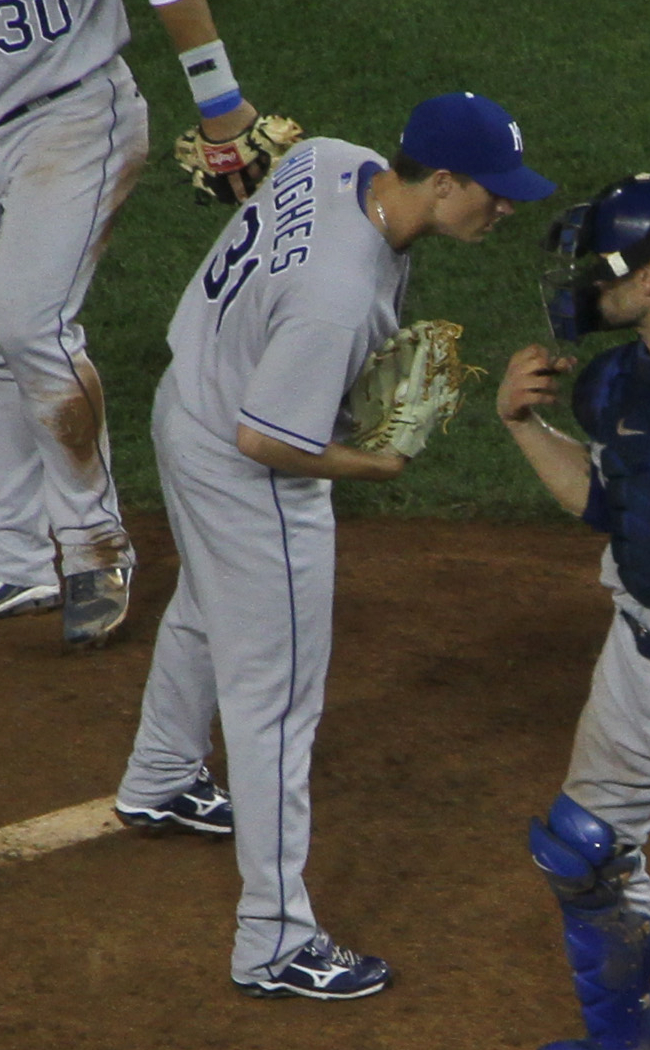
- Hughes with the Kansas City Royals
- Pitcher
- Born: June 29, 1982 (age 44); Tupelo, Mississippi, U.S.
- Batted: Left Threw: Left

MLB debut
- September 6, 2009, for the Kansas City Royals

Last MLB appearance
- May 27, 2011, for the Minnesota Twins

MLB statistics
- Win–loss record: 2–5
- Earned run average: 4.99
- Strikeouts: 60
- Stats at Baseball Reference

Teams
- Kansas City Royals (2009–2010); Minnesota Twins (2011)

Dustin Robert "Dusty" Hughes (born June 29, 1982) is an American former professional baseball pitcher. He played in Major League Baseball (MLB) for the Kansas City Royals and Minnesota Twins from 2009 to 2011.

== Career ==
=== Kansas City Royals ===
Hughes was drafted by the Kansas City Royals in the 11th round of the 2003 Major League Baseball draft.

On September 6, 2009 Hughes made his Major League debut against the Los Angeles Angels. Hughes threw 4 1/3 innings in relief, allowing just one hit and struck out five batters.

=== Minnesota Twins ===
On January 26, 2011, Hughes was claimed off waivers by the Minnesota Twins. He posted an ERA of 9.95 before being designated for assignment.

=== Atlanta Braves ===
On November 12, 2011, Hughes signed a minor league contract with the Atlanta Braves organization. He was released on November 2, 2012.

Hughes re-signed with Atlanta on November 15, 2012. He was released by the Braves on May 9, 2013.
