= Anthony Lerew =

American baseball player and coach (born 1982)

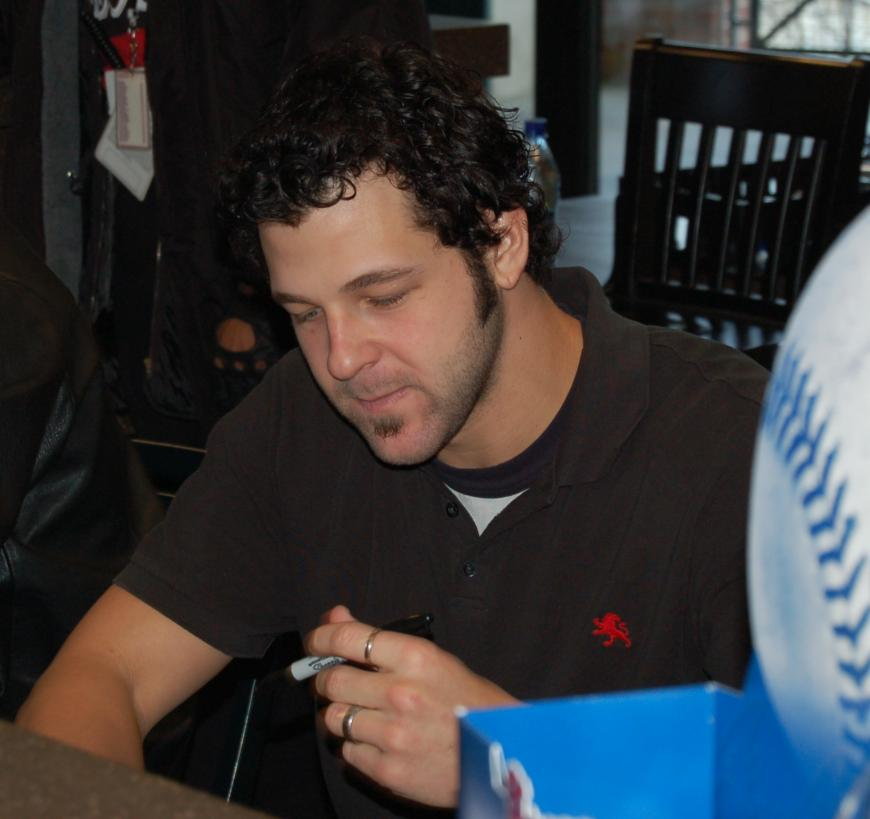

Kia Tigers – No. 89
- Pitcher / Coach
- Born: October 28, 1982 (age 43); Carlisle, Pennsylvania, U.S.
- Batted: Left Threw: Right

Professional debut
- MLB: September 4, 2005, for the Atlanta Braves
- NPB: May 5, 2011, for the Fukuoka SoftBank Hawks
- KBO: April 8, 2012, for the Kia Tigers

Last appearance
- MLB: July 20, 2010, for the Kansas City Royals
- NPB: June 6, 2011, for the Fukuoka SoftBank Hawks
- KBO: July 3, 2013, for the Kia Tigers

MLB statistics
- Win–loss record: 1–7
- Earned run average: 7.48
- Strikeouts: 40

NPB statistics
- Win–loss record: 0-0
- Earned run average: 1.80
- Strikeouts: 1

KBO statistics
- Win–loss record: 11-16
- Earned run average: 3.94
- Strikeouts: 119
- Stats at Baseball Reference

Teams
- Atlanta Braves (2005–2007); Kansas City Royals (2009–2010); Fukuoka SoftBank Hawks (2011); Kia Tigers (2012–2013)

Career highlights and awards
- Japan Series champion (2011)

Anthony Allen Lerew (born October 28, 1982) is an American former professional baseball pitcher who played in Major League Baseball (MLB) for the Atlanta Braves and Kansas City Royals; he also played Nippon Professional Baseball (NPB) for the Fukuoka SoftBank Hawks, and in the KBO League for the Kia Tigers, he also played for the Navegantes del Magallanes on the LVBP Liga Venezolana de Béisbol Profesional where on 11/21/2010 against the Leones del Caracas (the biggest rival team) he managed to throw a no hit no run game (to date the last to be ever thrown in Venezuela).

== Career ==
=== Atlanta Braves ===
Lerew, a graduate of Northern York High School in Dillsburg, Pennsylvania, was drafted by the Atlanta Braves in the 11th round of the 2001 Major League Baseball draft. After four seasons in the Braves' minor league system, he debuted on September 4, 2005, in a home game against the Cincinnati Reds. In the 2005 season, Lerew recorded no wins, no losses, 5 strikeouts, and a 5.62 earned run average in 7 games, all of which were relief outings.

On February 23, 2006, the Braves signed Lerew to a one-year deal. A month later, on February 23, he was optioned to the Triple-A Richmond Braves. With Richmond, Lerew compiled a 3–5 record with a 7.48 ERA and 69 strikeouts in 16 games, 15 of which he started.

The Braves called up Lerew from Richmond on September 1, 2006. He made his 2006 debut the next day with a relief appearance in the fifth inning. Lerew pitched 2 innings, allowing 5 runs and striking out 1 batter. He was sent back down to the Richmond Braves on September 4, having appeared in only one game.

On May 8, 2007, Lerew made his first big-league start for Atlanta when he was called up from Richmond yet again, this time to replace Mark Redman in a game against the San Diego Padres. He was later sent down to Richmond again.

On June 20, 2007, Lerew underwent season-ending Tommy John surgery and was placed on the 60-day disabled list. He recovered from surgery in Southern Florida, at the Braves extended spring training site. Once recovered, he spent the rest of 2008 pitching for the Gulf Coast Braves and with Triple-A Richmond.

On March 5, 2009, Lerew was outrighted to Triple-A Gwinnett to make room on the roster for Tom Glavine, and was released five days later.

=== Kansas City Royals ===
On March 18, 2009, Lerew signed a minor league deal with the Kansas City Royals. Lerew spent the 2009 minor league season with the Double-A Northwest Arkansas Naturals. He was called up in September and made his Royals debut on September 24, 2009. He re-signed with them in February.

On June 16, 2010, Lerew was called up from the Triple-A Omaha Royals to the Royals to replace Luke Hochevar, who went on the disabled list with a sprained elbow. He earned his first career major league win on June 28 of that year over the Chicago White Sox.

=== Fukuoka SoftBank Hawks ===
On November 16, 2010, Lerew signed a minor league contract with the Oakland Athletics organization. He was released by Oakland on December 23, in order to pursue an opportunity in Japan. Lerew signed with the Fukuoka SoftBank Hawks of Nippon Professional Baseball for the 2011 season.

=== Kia Tigers ===
On January 16, 2012, Lerew signed a bonus of $50,000 with Kia Tigers of the KBO League with Alex Graman. As a starter, he went 11–13 in his first season with them, with 94 strikeouts and an earned run average of 3.83. He was resigned with Kia Tigers for 2013 season, but was released on July 24, 2013.

=== York Revolution ===
On April 11, 2014, the York Revolution signed Lerew.

=== Los Angeles Angels ===
Lerew signed a minor league deal with the Los Angeles Angels of Anaheim on May 20, 2014.

=== York Revolution ===
Lerew signed with the York Revolution of the Atlantic League of Professional Baseball for the 2015 season. He became a free agent after the 2015 season.

== No-hitter ==
Pitching for Navegantes del Magallanes in the Venezuelan Professional Baseball League, Lerew pitched the 16th no-hitter in league history against Leones del Caracas on Nov. 21, 2010.
