= 2010 Detroit Tigers season =

Major League Baseball season

2010 Detroit Tigers
- League: American League
- Division: Central
- Ballpark: Comerica Park
- City: Detroit, Michigan
- Record: 81–81 (.500)
- Divisional place: 3rd
- Owners: Mike Ilitch
- General managers: Dave Dombrowski
- Managers: Jim Leyland
- Television: Fox Sports Detroit (Mario Impemba, Rod Allen)
- Radio: Detroit Tigers Radio Network (Dan Dickerson, Jim Price)
- Stats: ESPN.com; Baseball Reference

The 2010 Detroit Tigers season was the team's 110th season. This year saw the passing of legendary Tigers broadcaster Ernie Harwell, and nearly saw the first perfect game thrown by a Tigers pitcher. The Tigers spent most of the season in 2nd or 3rd place. The third-place Tigers finished 13 games behind the AL Central Champion Minnesota Twins, with an 81–81 record and failed to make the playoffs.

Austin Jackson made the Tigers' opening day roster, and was American League Rookie of the Month for April. 2010 also saw the debuts of several rookies from the Tiger farm system, including Brennan Boesch, Scott Sizemore, Danny Worth, Casper Wells and Will Rhymes. Boesch was called up on April 23, 2010, and was named the AL Rookie of the Month for May and June.

The Tigers sent three players to the 2010 All-Star game. Miguel Cabrera and José Valverde were selected as reserves, and starter Justin Verlander was added to the team when another AL starter who was selected was unable to pitch due to scheduling. At the All-Star break, the Tigers were a half-game out of first place in the AL Central, behind the Chicago White Sox. But a slow start and injuries to key players Magglio Ordóñez, Carlos Guillén and Brandon Inge shortly after the break sent the Tigers into a tailspin. Closer Valverde would also suffer a series of nagging injuries down the stretch. The Tigers finished the season with an 81–81 record, good for third place, 13 games back of the division-winning Minnesota Twins. While playing outstanding baseball at home, the Tigers were just 29–52 on the road. Only the Seattle Mariners had fewer road wins than the Tigers among American League teams.

Among the season highlights were Miguel Cabrera hitting .328 with 38 home runs and an AL-best 126 RBI, earning the American League Silver Slugger Award at first base and finishing second in the AL MVP race (earning 5 of 28 first-place votes). Austin Jackson (.293 average, 103 runs, 181 hits, 27 stolen bases) finished second in the AL Rookie-of-the-Year voting. Justin Verlander enjoyed another strong season (18–9 record, 3.37 ERA, 219 strikeouts). After a slow start and a brief trip to the minors, Max Scherzer showed promise with a 12–11 record, 3.50 ERA and 181 strikeouts.

On July 26, the Tigers were on the losing end of Matt Garza's no-hitter in Tampa.

Until 2015, this was the last season in which the Tigers failed to make the playoffs.

== 2009-10 offseason activities ==
=== Personnel changes ===
- On October 9, first base coach Andy Van Slyke announced he is leaving the team.
- On November 9, the Tigers hired Tom Brookens as their new first base coach. Brookens played on the 1984 World Series championship team and was most recently the manager of the team's Class-AA affiliate at Erie.

=== Releases ===
- On November 6, the Tigers removed Marcus Thames and Matt Treanor from their 40-man roster, allowing them to become free agents.
- On November 16, the Tigers released Jarrod Washburn and Aubrey Huff to free agency.
- On December 1, the Tigers released Plácido Polanco to free agency.
- On December 8, Fernando Rodney and Brandon Lyon turned down arbitration and became free agents.

=== Trades ===
- On December 7, the Tigers traded Clay Rapada to Texas for a player to be named later or cash considerations.
- On December 9, the Tigers completed a 3 team deal. They gave Curtis Granderson to the Yankees and Edwin Jackson to the Diamondbacks and received Max Scherzer and Daniel Schlereth from Arizona and Austin Jackson and Phil Coke from New York.
- On December 21, the Tigers traded Dusty Ryan to San Diego for cash considerations or a player to be named later.
- On March 30, the Tigers traded Nate Robertson and cash considerations to Florida for Jay Voss and cash considerations.

=== Signings ===
- On November 20, the Tigers purchased the contracts of Scott Sizemore, Audy Ciriaco, Ryan Strieby, and Brennan Boesch.
- On December 7, the Tigers signed Brad Thomas.
- Also on December 7, the Tigers re-signed Adam Everett to a one-year deal.
- On December 16, the Tigers re-signed Ramón Santiago to a two-year deal.
- On January 13, the Tigers re-signed Joel Zumaya, avoiding arbitration.
- On January 19, the Tigers signed José Valverde to a two-year deal.
- Also on January 19, the Tigers re-signed Gerald Laird, Zach Miner and Bobby Seay.
- On February 4, it was announced that Justin Verlander and the Tigers have reached a deal for an $80 million, 5-year contract extension.
- On February 22, the Tigers signed Johnny Damon to a one-year deal.

=== Roster ===
2010 Detroit Tigers
Roster
Pitchers: 38 Jeremy Bonderman; 49 Eddie Bonine; 40 Phil Coke; 53 Casey Fien; 43 Alfredo Figaro; 58 Armando Galarraga; 21 Enrique González; 59 Fu-Te Ni; 41 Andrew Oliver; 45 Ryan Perry; 48 Rick Porcello; 56 Jay Sborz; 37 Max Scherzer; 55 Daniel Schlereth; 36 Brad Thomas; 46 José Valverde; 35 Justin Verlander; 34 Robbie Weinhardt; 21 Dontrelle Willis; 54 Joel Zumaya	Catchers: 13 Alex Avila; 8,12 Gerald Laird; 63 Max St. Pierre; Infielders: 24 Miguel Cabrera; 4 Adam Everett; 9 Carlos Guillén; 15 Brandon Inge; 19 Jeff Larish; 27 Jhonny Peralta; 28 Will Rhymes; 39 Ramón Santiago; 20 Scott Sizemore; 29 Danny Worth; Outfielders: 26 Brennan Boesch; 18 Johnny Damon; 53 Jeff Frazier; 14 Austin Jackson; 32 Don Kelly; 30 Magglio Ordóñez; 25 Ryan Raburn; 57 Casper Wells	Manager: 10 Jim Leyland; Coaches: 17 Rafael Belliard (infield); 61 Tom Brookens (first base); 51 Jeff Jones (bullpen); 52 Rick Knapp (pitching); 22 Gene Lamont (third base); 12,8 Lloyd McClendon (hitting)

== Transactions ==
- On June 1, the Tigers traded Dontrelle Willis and cash considerations to Arizona for Billy Buckner.
- On June 6, the Tigers designated Adam Everett for assignment.
- On July 28, the Tigers acquired Jhonny Peralta from the Indians in exchange for minor league pitcher Giovanni Soto and cash considerations.

== Tributes to Ernie Harwell ==
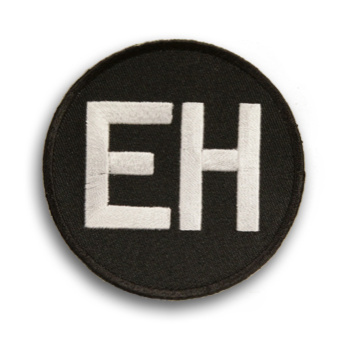
Ernie Harwell commemorative patch worn in 2010.

On May 4, Tigers broadcaster Ernie Harwell died at age 92. Two days later, Harwell's body lied in repose at Comerica Park, with over 10,000 fans filing past the casket. In his honor, the Tigers wore patches (shown at right) and flew a flag in the center field of Comerica Park both bearing his initials for the remainder of the season.

== The near-perfect game ==
In the June 2 game against Cleveland, Armando Galarraga had a perfect game going with two outs in the top of the ninth when first base umpire Jim Joyce made a controversial call, ruling a batter safe at first when video replay showed he was out. Joyce later said "I took a perfect game away from that kid, I thought he beat the throw. I was convinced he beat the throw, until I saw the replay." After the game, Galarraga told reporters Joyce apologized to him directly and gave him a hug. Despite large fan support for overturning the call, MLB Commissioner Bud Selig let the call stand, but said he would look into expanding replay beyond home run calls for the future.

It would have been the first perfect game thrown by a Tigers pitcher. Two previous Tigers, Tommy Bridges (1932) and Milt Wilcox (1983), had also come within one out of throwing perfect games before having them broken up by the 27th batter.

== Season standings ==
=== American League Central ===
AL Central
Team	W	L	Pct.	GB	Home	Road
Minnesota Twins	94	68	.580	—	53‍–‍28	41‍–‍40
Chicago White Sox	88	74	.543	6	45‍–‍36	43‍–‍38
Detroit Tigers	81	81	.500	13	52‍–‍29	29‍–‍52
Cleveland Indians	69	93	.426	25	38‍–‍43	31‍–‍50
Kansas City Royals	67	95	.414	27	38‍–‍43	29‍–‍52

=== American League Wild Card ===
Division winners
Team	W	L	Pct.
Tampa Bay Rays	96	66	.593
Minnesota Twins	94	68	.580
Texas Rangers	90	72	.556

Wild Card team (Top team qualifies for postseason)
Team	W	L	Pct.	GB
New York Yankees	95	67	.586	—
Boston Red Sox	89	73	.549	6
Chicago White Sox	88	74	.543	7
Toronto Blue Jays	85	77	.525	10
Detroit Tigers	81	81	.500	14
Oakland Athletics	81	81	.500	14
Los Angeles Angels of Anaheim	80	82	.494	15
Cleveland Indians	69	93	.426	26
Kansas City Royals	67	95	.414	28
Baltimore Orioles	66	96	.407	29
Seattle Mariners	61	101	.377	34

=== Record vs. opponents ===
2010 American League record Source: MLB Standings Grid – 2010
Team	BAL	BOS	CWS	CLE	DET	KC	LAA	MIN	NYY	OAK	SEA	TB	TEX	TOR	NL
Baltimore	–	9–9	4–3	3–3	5–5	2–4	6–0	3–5	5–13	3–7	3–6	7–11	6–4	3–15	7–11
Boston	9–9	–	1–6	4–4	3–3	4–3	9–1	3–2	9–9	4–5	7–3	7–11	4–6	12–6	13–5
Chicago	3–4	6–1	–	9–9	8–10	10–8	7–2	5–13	2–4	4–5	9–1	3–4	4–5	3–5	15–3
Cleveland	3–3	4–4	9–9	–	9–9	10–8	5–4	6–12	2–6	3–6	3–4	2–7	2–4	6–4	5–13
Detroit	5–5	3–3	10–8	9–9	–	10–8	6–4	9–9	4–4	3–3	3–5	1–6	3–6	4–4	11–7
Kansas City	4–2	3-4	9–10	8–10	8–10	–	3-7	5–13	3–5	3–6	5–4	4–4	2–7	3–3	8–10
Los Angeles	0–6	1–9	2–7	4–5	4–6	7–3	–	2–5	4–4	11–8	15–4	4–5	9–10	6–3	11–7
Minnesota	5–3	2–3	13–5	12–6	9–9	13–5	5–2	–	2–4	6–3	6-4	3–5	7–3	3–6	8–10
New York	13–5	9–9	4–2	6-2	4–4	5–3	4–4	4–2	–	9–1	6–4	8–10	4–4	8–10	11–7
Oakland	7–3	5–4	5–4	6–3	3–3	6–3	8–11	3–6	1–9	–	13–6	4–5	9–10	3–4	8–10
Seattle	6–3	3–7	1–9	4–3	5–3	4–5	4–15	4–6	4–6	6–13	–	2–7	7–12	2–3	9–9
Tampa Bay	11–7	11–7	4–3	7–2	6–1	4–4	5–4	5–3	10–8	5–4	7–2	–	4–2	10–8	7–11
Texas	4–6	6–4	5–4	4–2	6–3	7–2	10-9	3-7	4-4	10-9	12–7	2–4	–	3–7	14–4
Toronto	15–3	6–12	5–3	4–6	4–4	3–3	3–6	6–3	10–8	4–3	3–2	8–10	7–3	–	7–11

- Source: MLB Standings Grid – 2010

== Game log ==
Legend
Tigers win	Tigers loss	Game postponed

2010 Game Log
April (14–10)

#	Date	Opponent	Score	Win	Loss	Save	Attendance	Record
1	April 5	@ Royals	W 8–4	Zumaya (1–0)	Tejeda (0–1)		40,052	1–0
2	April 7	@ Royals	L 3–2 (11)	Farnsworth (1–0)	Valverde (0–1)		10,574	1–1
3	April 8	@ Royals	W 7–3	Bonine (1–0)	Mendoza (0–1)		10,909	2–1
4	April 9	Indians	W 5–2	Porcello (1–0)	Huff (0–1)	Valverde (1)	45,010	3–1
5	April 10	Indians	W 4–2	Bonderman (1–0)	Talbot (0–1)	Perry (1)	35,332	4–1
6	April 11	Indians	W 9–8	Coke (1–0)	Perez (0–1)		26,081	5–1
7	April 12	Royals	L 10–5	Hochevar (1–0)	Scherzer (0–1)		17,058	5–2
8	April 13	Royals	W 6–5	Zumaya (2–0)	Hughes (0–1)	Valverde (2)	18,414	6–2
9	April 14	Royals	L 7–3	Davies (1–0)	Perry (0–1)	Soria (2)	19,262	6–3
10	April 16	@ Mariners	L 11–3	Hernández (1–0)	Bonderman (1–1)		39,999	6–4
11	April 17	@ Mariners	L 4–2	League (2–0)	Verlander (0–1)	Aardsma (5)	31,647	6–5
12	April 18	@ Mariners	W 4–2	Scherzer (1–1)	Snell (0–2)	Valverde (3)	30,419	7–5
13	April 19	@ Angels	L 2–0	Piñeiro (2–1)	Willis (0–1)	Rodney (4)	36,006	7–6
14	April 20	@ Angels	L 6–5	Kazmir (1–1)	Porcello (1–1)	Rodney (5)	35,266	7–7
15	April 21	@ Angels	W 4–3	Coke (2–0)	Fuentes (0–1)	Valverde (4)	35,279	8–7
16	April 22	@ Angels	W 5–4	Verlander (1–1)	Saunders (1–3)	Valverde (5)	37,338	9–7
17	April 23	@ Rangers	L 5–4	Feliz (1–0)	Ni (0–1)		26,445	9–8
18	April 24	@ Rangers	W 8–4	Bonine (2–0)	Feldman (1–2)		45,752	10–8
19	April 25	@ Rangers	L 8–4	Lewis (3–0)	Porcello (1–2)		31,211	10–9
20	April 26	@ Rangers	W 8–6	Coke (3–0)	Feliz (1–1)	Valverde (6)	16,381	11–9
21	April 27	Twins	L 2–0	Liriano (3–0)	Verlander (1–2)	Rauch (7)	22,008	11–10
22	April 28	Twins	W 11–6	Thomas (1–0)	Mahay (0–1)		19,900	12–10
23	April 29	Twins	W 3–0	Willis (1–1)	Pavano (3–2)	Valverde (7)	25,595	13–10
24	April 30	Angels	W 10–6	Porcello (2–2)	Piñeiro (2–3)		31,725	14–10

May (12–14)

#	Date	Opponent	Score	Win	Loss	Save	Attendance	Record
25	May 1	Angels	W 3–2	Perry (1–1)	Shields (0–1)		31,042	15–10
26	May 2	Angels	W 5–1	Verlander (2–2)	Weaver (3–1)		25,603	16–10
27	May 3	@ Twins	L 10–4	Baker (3–2)	Scherzer (1–2)		38,728	16–11
28	May 4	@ Twins	L 4–3	Blackburn (2–1)	Perry (1–2)		39,020	16–12
29	May 5	@ Twins	L 5–4	Slowey (4–2)	Porcello (2–3)	Rauch (8)	39,037	16–13
–	May 7	@ Indians	Postponed (rain) – rescheduled for July 17					
30	May 8	@ Indians	W 6–4	Verlander (3–2)	Wood (0–1)	Valverde (8)	18,428	17–13
31	May 9	@ Indians	L 7–4	Talbot (4–2)	Scherzer (1–3)	Perez (5)	16,980	17–14
32	May 10	Yankees	W 5–4	Bonine (3–0)	Mitre (0–1)	Valverde (9)	34,365	18–14
–	May 11	Yankees	Postponed (rain) – rescheduled for May 12					
33	May 12	Yankees	W 2–0	Porcello (3–3)	Vázquez (1–4)	Valverde (10)	27,376	19–14
34	May 12	Yankees	L 8–0	Hughes (5–0)	Bonderman (1–2)		28,514	19–15
35	May 13	Yankees	W 6–0	Verlander (4–2)	Sabathia (4–2)		31,130	20–15
36	May 14	Red Sox	L 7–2	Buchholz (4–3)	Scherzer (1–4)		31,732	20–16
37	May 15	Red Sox	W 7–6 (12)	Valverde (1–1)	Delcarmen (1–2)		40,742	21–16
38	May 16	Red Sox	W 5–1	Galarraga (1–0)	Lackey (4–2)		35,454	22–16
–	May 17	White Sox	Postponed (rain) – rescheduled for August 3					
39	May 18	White Sox	L 6–2	García (3–2)	Porcello (3–4)		28,155	22–17
40	May 19	@ Athletics	W 5–1	Verlander (5–2)	Braden (4–4)		19,284	23–17
41	May 20	@ Athletics	W 5–2	Bonderman (2–2)	Ross (1–2)	Valverde (11)	24,146	24–17
42	May 21	@ Dodgers	L 4–1	Billingsley (5–2)	Willis (1–2)	Broxton (9)	44,282	24–18
43	May 22	@ Dodgers	L 6–4	Ely (3–1)	Galarraga (1–1)	Broxton (10)	45,117	24–19
44	May 23	@ Dodgers	W 6–2	Porcello (4–4)	Kuroda (5–2)		46,053	25–19
45	May 25	@ Mariners	L 5–3	Kelley (3–0)	Verlander (5–3)	Aardsma (10)	20,920	25–20
46	May 26	@ Mariners	L 5–4	League (4–4)	Perry (1–3)	Aardsma (11)	22,422	25–21
47	May 28	Athletics	L 5–4	Ziegler (2–2)	Perry (1–4)	Bailey (10)	40,210	25–22
48	May 29	Athletics	L 6–0	Anderson (2–1)	Porcello (4–5)		39,750	25–23
49	May 30	Athletics	W 10–2	Scherzer (2–4)	Braden (4–5)	Zumaya (1)	32,510	26–23
50	May 31	Athletics	L 4–1	Cahill (4–2)	Verlander (5–4)	Bailey (11)	23,641	26–24

June (15–12)

#	Date	Opponent	Score	Win	Loss	Save	Attendance	Record
51	June 1	Indians	L 3–2	Westbrook (3–3)	Bonderman (2–3)	Wood (3)	19,446	26–25
52	June 2	Indians	W 3–0	Galarraga (2–1)	Carmona (4–4)		17,738	27–25
53	June 3	Indians	W 12–6	Thomas (2–0)	Ambriz (0–1)		28,169	28–25
54	June 4	@ Royals	L 7–3	Chen (2–0)	Scherzer (2–5)		21,930	28–26
55	June 5	@ Royals	W 4–2	Verlander (6–4)	Hochevar (5–4)	Valverde (12)	24,383	29–26
56	June 6	@ Royals	L 7–2	Bannister (6–3)	Bonderman (2–4)		22,240	29–27
57	June 8	@ White Sox	W 7–2	Thomas (3–0)	Thornton (2–3)		20,776	30–27
58	June 9	@ White Sox	L 15–3	García (6–3)	Porcello (4–6)		21,959	30–28
59	June 10	@ White Sox	L 3–0	Danks (5–5)	Scherzer (2–6)	Jenks (10)	26,004	30–29
60	June 11	Pirates	W 6–2	Verlander (7–4)	Ohlendorf (0–4)		33,236	31–29
61	June 12	Pirates	W 4–3 (10)	Coke (4–0)	Donnelly (2–1)		34,501	32–29
62	June 13	Pirates	W 4–3	Thomas (4–0)	López (1–1)	Valverde (13)	31,243	33–29
63	June 15	Nationals	W 7–4	Scherzer (3–6)	Lannan (2–4)	Valverde (14)	24,821	34–29
64	June 16	Nationals	W 8–3	Verlander (8–4)	Hernández (5–4)		24,767	35–29
65	June 17	Nationals	W 8–3	Bonderman (3–4)	Atilano (5–4)		33,630	36–29
66	June 18	Diamondbacks	W 7–5	Coke (5–0)	Qualls (1–4)	Valverde (15)	37,438	37–29
67	June 19	Diamondbacks	L 6–5	Jackson (4–6)	Porcello (4–7)	Heilman (1)	40,681	37–30
68	June 20	Diamondbacks	W 3–1	Scherzer (4–6)	Kennedy (3–5)	Valverde (16)	41,417	38–30
69	June 22	@ Mets	L 14–6	Nieve (2–3)	Verlander (8–5)		32,363	38–31
70	June 23	@ Mets	L 5–0	Dickey (6–0)	Bonderman (3–5)		35,045	38–32
71	June 24	@ Mets	W 6–5	Galarraga (3–1)	Takahashi (6–3)	Valverde (17)	31,319	39–32
72	June 25	@ Braves	L 3–1	Medlen (5–1)	Oliver (0–1)	Wagner (15)	36,634	39–33
73	June 26	@ Braves	L 4–3	Kawakami (1–9)	Zumaya (2–1)	Moylan (1)	39,184	39–34
74	June 27	@ Braves	W 10–4	Verlander (9–5)	Hanson (7–5)		26,034	40–34
75	June 28	@ Twins	W 7–5	Bonderman (4–5)	Liriano (6–6)	Valverde (18)	40,681	41–34
76	June 29	@ Twins	L 11–4	Blackburn (7–5)	Galarraga (3–2)		40,593	41–35
77	June 30	@ Twins	L 5–1	Slowey (8–5)	Oliver (0–2)		40,671	41–36

July (11–15)

#	Date	Opponent	Score	Win	Loss	Save	Attendance	Record
78	July 2	Mariners	W 7–1	Scherzer (5–6)	Fister (3–4)		32,512	42–36
79	July 3	Mariners	W 6–1	Verlander (10–5)	Vargas (6–4)		32,430	43–36
80	July 4	Mariners	L 8–1	Lee (8–3)	Bonderman (4–6)		24,899	43–37
81	July 5	Orioles	W 12–9	Bonine (4–0)	Hendrickson (1–4)		25,432	44–37
82	July 6	Orioles	W 7–5 (11)	Perry (2–4)	Hernandez (3–7)		22,532	45–37
83	July 7	Orioles	W 4–2	Scherzer (6–6)	Bergesen (3–6)		22,837	46–37
84	July 9	Twins	W 7–3	Verlander (11–5)	Liriano (6–7)		42,549	47–37
85	July 10	Twins	W 7–4	Bonderman (5–6)	Blackburn (7–7)	Valverde (19)	41,461	48–37
86	July 11	Twins	L 6–3	Pavano (10–6)	Oliver (0–3)	Rauch (20)	39,689	48–38
87	July 16	@ Indians	L 8–2	Westbrook (6–5)	Scherzer (6–7)		22,295	48–39
88	July 17	@ Indians	L 4–3	Carmona (9–7)	Coke (5–1)	Perez (8)	20,090	48–40
89	July 17	@ Indians	L 2–1 (11)	Perez (2–0)	Weinhardt (0–1)		20,092	48–41
90	July 18	@ Indians	L 7–2	Gómez (1–0)	Oliver (0–4)		19,102	48–42
91	July 19	Rangers	L 8–6 (14)	Harrison (2–1)	González (0–1)	Feliz (25)	26,626	48–43
92	July 20	Rangers	L 8–0	Hunter (7–0)	Galarraga (3–3)		27,576	48–44
93	July 21	Rangers	W 4–1	Scherzer (7–7)	Lewis (9–6)		28,704	49–44
94	July 22	Blue Jays	W 5–2	Verlander (12–5)	Romero (7–7)	Valverde (20)	34,476	50–44
–	July 23	Blue Jays	Postponed (rain) – rescheduled for July 25					
95	July 24	Blue Jays	L 3–2	Marcum (9–4)	Porcello (4–8)	Gregg (22)	39,391	50–45
96	July 25	Blue Jays	L 5–3	Downs (4–5)	Valverde (1–2)	Gregg (23)	38,526	50–46
97	July 25	Blue Jays	W 6–5	Coke (6–1)	Frasor (3–3)	Valverde (21)	37,093	51–46
98	July 26	@ Rays	L 5–0	Garza (11–5)	Scherzer (7–8)		17,009	51–47
99	July 27	@ Rays	L 3–2	Shields (9–9)	Verlander (12–6)	Soriano (27)	19,843	51–48
100	July 28	@ Rays	L 7–4	Niemann (9–3)	Bonine (4–1)	Soriano (28)	16,209	51–49
101	July 29	@ Rays	L 4–2	Price (14–5)	Porcello (4–9)	Wheeler (2)	26,716	51–50
102	July 30	@ Red Sox	W 6–5	Weinhardt (1–1)	Lester (11–6)		37,832	52–50
103	July 31	@ Red Sox	L 5–4	Okajima (4–3)	Coke (6–2)		37,395	52–51

August (13–16)

#	Date	Opponent	Score	Win	Loss	Save	Attendance	Record
104	August 1	@ Red Sox	L 4–3	Papelbon (4–4)	Thomas (4–1)		37,479	52–52
105	August 3	White Sox	L 12–2	Buehrle (10–8)	Porcello (4–10)		26,141	52–53
106	August 3	White Sox	W 7–1	Bonderman (6–6)	Torres (0–1)		24,826	53–53
107	August 4	White Sox	L 4–1	Jackson (7–10)	Galarraga (3–4)	Jenks (23)	31,770	53–54
108	August 5	White Sox	L 6–4 (11)	Santos (1–0)	Valverde (1–3)		34,156	53–55
109	August 6	Angels	L 4–2	Weaver (11–7)	Verlander (12–7)	Fuentes (21)	35,106	53–56
110	August 7	Angels	L 10–1	Kazmir (8–9)	Bonderman (6–7)		38,783	53–57
111	August 8	Angels	W 9–4	Porcello (5–10)	Bell (1–3)		32,037	54–57
112	August 9	Rays	L 6–3	Price (15–5)	Galarraga (3–5)	Soriano (32)	29,932	54–58
113	August 10	Rays	L 8–0	Hellickson (2–0)	Scherzer (7–9)		26,114	54–59
114	August 11	Rays	W 3–2	Verlander (13–7)	Garza (11–7)	Valverde (22)	28,815	55–59
115	August 13	@ White Sox	L 8–4	Buehrle (11–9)	Bonderman (6–8)		34,834	55–60
116	August 14	@ White Sox	W 3–2	Coke (7–2)	Putz (5–4)		36,548	56–60
117	August 15	@ White Sox	W 13–8	Thomas (5–1)	Putz (5–5)		36,287	57–60
118	August 16	@ Yankees	W 3–1	Scherzer (8–9)	Vázquez (9–9)	Valverde (23)	46,098	58–60
119	August 17	@ Yankees	L 6–2	Sabathia (16–5)	Verlander (13–8)		46,906	58–61
120	August 18	@ Yankees	L 9–5	Moseley (3–2)	Bonderman (6–9)		46,479	58–62
121	August 19	@ Yankees	L 11–5	Hughes (15–5)	Porcello (5–11)		48,143	58–63
122	August 20	Indians	W 6–0	Galarraga (4–5)	Masterson (4–12)		33,936	59–63
123	August 21	Indians	W 5–2	Scherzer (9–9)	Tomlin (1–3)	Valverde (24)	38,088	60–63
124	August 22	Indians	W 8–1	Verlander (14–8)	Gómez (3–2)		35,104	61–63
125	August 23	Royals	W 12–3	Bonderman (7–9)	Chen (8–7)		30,552	62–63
126	August 24	Royals	W 9–1	Porcello (6–11)	Davies (6–8)		29,043	63–63
127	August 25	Royals	L 4–3 (12)	Humber (1–0)	Fígaro (0–1)	Soria (36)	31,231	63–64
128	August 26	@ Blue Jays	W 7–1	Scherzer (10–9)	Romero (10–8)		16,088	64–64
129	August 27	@ Blue Jays	L 3–2 (11)	Camp (4–2)	Coke (7–3)		20,298	64–65
130	August 28	@ Blue Jays	L 5–4	Morrow (10–6)	Fígaro (0–2)	Gregg (30)	27,119	64–66
131	August 29	@ Blue Jays	W 10–4	Porcello (7–11)	Rzepczynski (1–3)		26,624	65–66
132	August 31	@ Twins	L 4–3	Guerrier (3–7)	Coke (7–4)	Capps (33)	40,186	65–67

September (15–11)

#	Date	Opponent	Score	Win	Loss	Save	Attendance	Record
133	September 1	@ Twins	L 2–1 (10)	Rauch (3–1)	Perry (2–5)		39,438	65–68
134	September 2	@ Twins	W 10–9 (13)	Valverde (2–3)	Blackburn (8–9)		39,551	66–68
135	September 3	@ Royals	W 9–5 (11)	Perry (3–5)	Chavez (5–5)		17,835	67–68
136	September 4	@ Royals	W 6–4	Porcello (8–11)	Hughes (1–2)	Valverde (25)	21,483	68–68
137	September 5	@ Royals	L 2–1	Davies (7–9)	Thomas (5–2)	Soria (37)	19,061	68–69
138	September 6	White Sox	L 5–4 (10)	Sale (1–1)	Valverde (2–4)		32,924	68–70
139	September 7	White Sox	W 9–1	Verlander (15–8)	García (11–6)		24,905	69–70
140	September 8	White Sox	W 5–1	Bonderman (8–9)	Danks (13–10)		25,995	70–70
141	September 9	White Sox	W 6–3	Porcello (9–11)	Floyd (10–12)	Perry (2)	29,995	71–70
142	September 10	Orioles	L 6–3	Hernandez (6–8)	Coke (7–5)	Uehara (8)	28,575	71–71
143	September 11	Orioles	L 5–3	Guthrie (10–13)	Scherzer (10–10)	Uehara (9)	28,139	71–72
144	September 12	Orioles	W 6–2	Verlander (16–8)	Gonzalez (0–3)		24,170	72–72
145	September 14	@ Rangers	L 11–4	Nippert (4–4)	Weinhardt (1–2)		24,452	72–73
146	September 15	@ Rangers	L 11–7	Lewis (11–12)	Galarraga (4–6)		34,964	72–74
147	September 17	@ White Sox	W 9–2	Scherzer (11–10)	Jackson (9–12)		28,563	73–74
148	September 18	@ White Sox	W 6–3	Verlander (17–8)	Santos (2–1)		27,828	74–74
149	September 19	@ White Sox	W 9–7 (11)	Weinhardt (2–2)	Santos (2–2)	Schlereth (1)	24,417	75–74
150	September 20	Royals	W 7–5	Thomas (6–2)	Greinke (9–13)	Coke (2)	24,382	76–74
151	September 21	Royals	L 9–6	Chen (11–7)	Galarraga (4–7)	Soria (40)	26,178	76–75
152	September 22	Royals	W 4–2	Scherzer (12–10)	Davies (8–11)		24,678	77–75
153	September 24	Twins	W 10–1	Verlander (18–8)	Liriano (14–9)		30,083	78–75
154	September 25	Twins	W 11–10 (13)	Schlereth (1–0)	Neshek (0–1)		34,129	79–75
155	September 26	Twins	W 5–1	Porcello (10–11)	Duensing (10–3)		32,021	80–75
156	September 27	@ Indians	L 6–3	Carrasco (2–1)	Galarraga (4–8)	Perez (22)	10,161	80–76
–	September 28	@ Indians	Postponed (rain) – rescheduled for September 29					
157	September 29	@ Indians	L 4–0	Talbot (10–13)	Scherzer (12–11)			80–77
158	September 29	@ Indians	L 4–3	Tomlin (6–4)	Verlander (18–9)	Perez (23)	12,227	80–78
–	September 30	@ Orioles	Postponed (rain) – rescheduled for October 1					

October (1–3)

#	Date	Opponent	Score	Win	Loss	Save	Attendance	Record
159	October 1	@ Orioles	L 10–6	Tillman (2–5)	Bonderman (8–10)			80–79
160	October 1	@ Orioles	L 2–1	Guthrie (11–14)	Porcello (10–12)	Uehara (12)	20,870	80–80
161	October 2	@ Orioles	L 2–1	Matusz (10–12)	Galarraga (4–9)	Uehara (13)	35,332	80–81
162	October 3	@ Orioles	W 4–2	Schlereth (2–0)	Bergesen (8–12)	Valverde (26)	23,914	81–81

== Player stats ==
=== Batting ===
Note: G = Games played; AB = At bats; R = Runs; H = Hits; 2B = Doubles; 3B = Triples; HR = Home runs; RBI = Runs batted in; SB = Stolen bases; BB = Walks; AVG = Batting average; SLG = Slugging average

Player	G	AB	R	H	2B	3B	HR	RBI	SB	BB	AVG	SLG
Austin Jackson	151	618	103	181	34	10	4	41	27	47	.293	.400
Miguel Cabrera	150	548	111	180	45	1	38	126	3	89	.328	.622
Johnny Damon	145	539	81	146	36	5	8	51	11	69	.271	.401
Brandon Inge	144	514	47	127	28	5	13	70	4	54	.247	.397
Brennan Boesch	133	464	49	119	26	3	14	67	7	40	.256	.416
Ryan Raburn	113	371	54	104	25	1	15	62	2	27	.280	.474
Magglio Ordóñez	84	323	56	98	17	1	12	59	1	40	.303	.474
Ramón Santiago	112	320	38	84	9	1	3	22	2	30	.263	.325
Alex Avila	104	294	28	67	12	0	7	31	2	36	.228	.340
Gerald Laird	89	270	22	56	11	0	5	25	3	18	.207	.304
Carlos Guillén	68	253	26	69	17	1	6	34	1	21	.273	.419
Don Kelly	119	238	30	58	4	0	9	27	3	8	.244	.374
Jhonny Peralta	57	217	23	55	7	0	8	38	0	21	.253	.396
Will Rhymes	54	191	30	58	12	3	1	19	0	14	.304	.414
Scott Sizemore	48	143	19	32	7	0	3	14	0	15	.224	.336
Danny Worth	39	106	10	27	5	0	2	8	1	6	.255	.358
Casper Wells	36	93	14	30	6	1	4	17	0	6	.323	.538
Adam Everett	31	81	6	15	5	0	0	4	2	4	.185	.247
Jeff Frazier	9	23	3	5	1	0	0	1	0	1	.217	.261
Jeff Larish	3	10	0	2	0	0	0	1	0	0	.200	.200
Max St. Pierre	6	9	1	2	1	0	0	0	0	0	.222	.333
Pitcher totals	162	18	0	0	0	0	0	0	0	0	.000	.000
Team totals	162	5643	751	1515	308	32	152	717	69	546	.268	.415

=== Pitching ===
Note: W = Wins; L = Losses; ERA = Earned run average; G = Games pitched; GS = Games started; SV = Saves; IP = Innings pitched; H = Hits allowed; R = Runs allowed; ER = Earned runs allowed; BB = Walks allowed; SO = Strikeouts

Player	W	L	ERA	G	GS	SV	IP	H	R	ER	BB	SO
Justin Verlander	18	9	3.37	33	33	0	224.1	190	89	84	71	219
Max Scherzer	12	11	3.50	31	31	0	195.2	174	84	76	70	184
Jeremy Bonderman	8	10	5.53	30	29	0	171.0	187	113	105	60	112
Rick Porcello	10	12	4.92	27	27	0	162.2	188	96	89	38	84
Armando Galarraga	4	9	4.49	25	24	0	144.1	143	75	72	51	74
Brad Thomas	6	2	3.89	49	2	0	69.1	77	31	30	29	30
Eddie Bonine	4	1	4.63	47	1	0	68.0	84	37	35	22	26
Phil Coke	7	5	3.76	74	1	2	64.2	67	29	27	26	53
José Valverde	2	4	3.00	60	0	26	63.0	41	24	21	32	63
Ryan Perry	3	5	3.59	60	0	2	62.2	55	26	25	23	45
Dontrelle Willis	1	2	4.98	9	8	0	43.1	48	24	24	29	33
Joel Zumaya	2	1	2.58	31	0	1	38.1	32	13	11	11	34
Robbie Weinhardt	2	2	6.14	28	0	0	29.1	40	23	20	8	21
Enrique González	0	1	3.81	18	0	0	26.0	21	11	11	17	13
Fu-Te Ni	0	1	6.65	22	0	0	23.0	27	19	17	19	22
Andy Oliver	0	4	7.36	5	5	0	22.0	26	22	18	13	18
Daniel Schlereth	2	0	2.89	18	0	1	18.2	20	7	6	10	19
Alfredo Fígaro	0	2	6.75	8	1	0	14.2	18	12	11	8	5
Casey Fien	0	0	10.13	2	0	0	2.2	4	3	3	0	0
Jay Sborz	0	0	67.50	1	0	0	0.2	3	5	5	0	1
Team totals	81	81	4.30	162	162	32	1444.1	1445	743	690	537	1056

== Farm system ==
Level	Team	League	Manager
AAA	Toledo Mud Hens	International League	Larry Parrish
AA	Erie SeaWolves	Eastern League	Phil Nevin
A	Lakeland Flying Tigers	Florida State League	Andy Barkett
A	West Michigan Whitecaps	Midwest League	Joe DePastino
A-Short Season	Connecticut Tigers	New York–Penn League	Howard Bushong
Rookie	GCL Tigers	Gulf Coast League	Basilio Cabrera
