= Sborz =

Sborz is a surname. Notable people with this surname include:

- Jay Sborz (born 1985), American baseball player
- Josh Sborz (born 1993), American baseball player
