= Eddie Bonine =

American baseball player (born 1981)

Eddie Bonine, Jr.
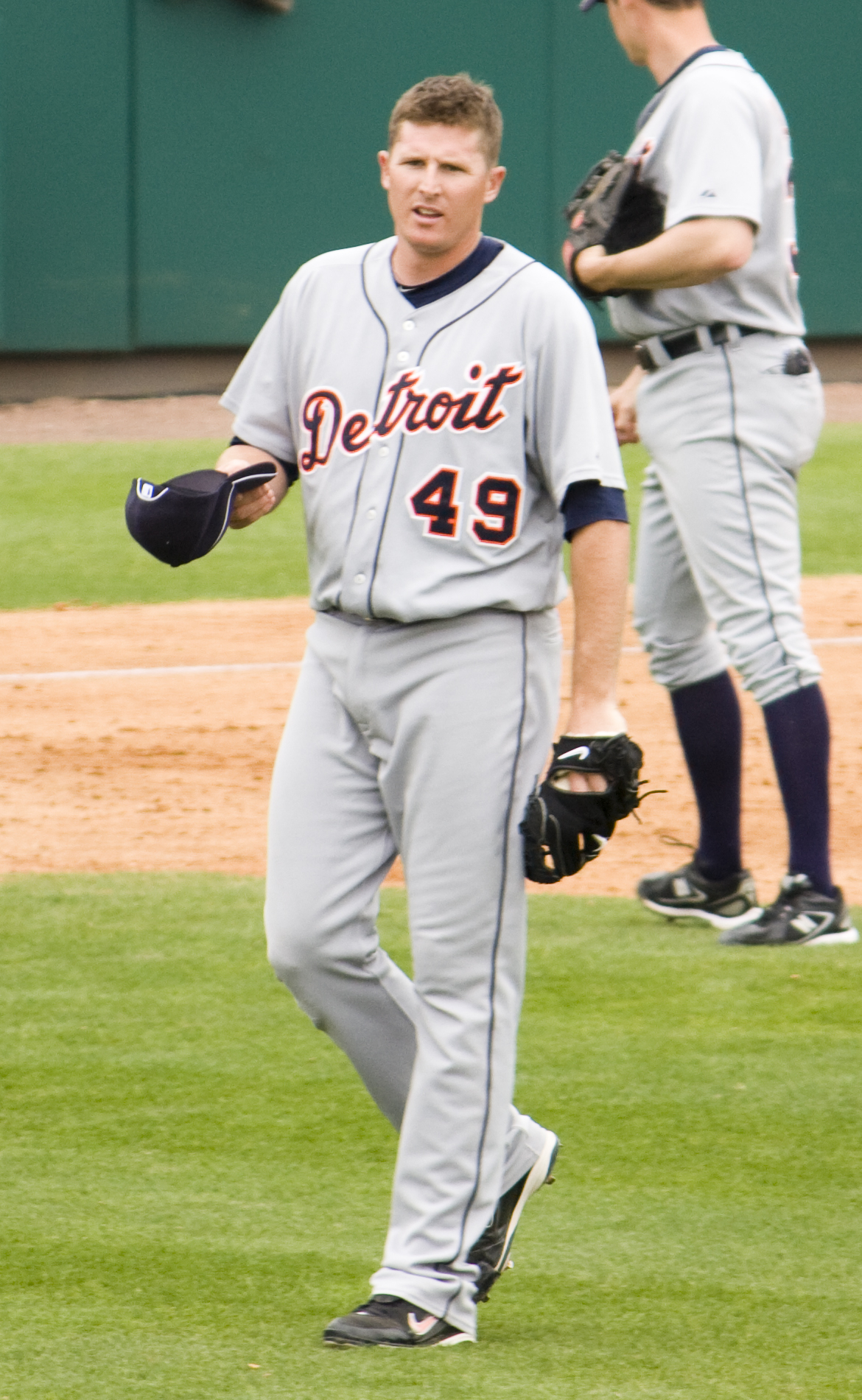
- Bonine with the Detroit Tigers
- Pitcher
- Born: June 6, 1981 (age 45); Columbus, Georgia, U.S.
- Batted: Right Threw: Right

MLB debut
- June 14, 2008, for the Detroit Tigers

Last MLB appearance
- October 1, 2010, for the Detroit Tigers

MLB statistics
- Win–loss record: 7–3
- Earned run average: 4.74
- Strikeouts: 54
- Stats at Baseball Reference

Teams
- Detroit Tigers (2008–2010)

Eddie Keith Bonine (born June 6, 1981) is an American former professional baseball pitcher. He played in Major League Baseball (MLB) with the Detroit Tigers from 2008 to 2010.

== College career ==
Bonine was born in Columbus, Georgia, but moved to Glendale, Arizona, where he attended Mountain Ridge High School. After graduating he attended Glendale Community College 1999–2001. In his second year he was named to the Arizona Community College Athletic Conference's First Team. At Glendale, he attracted the attention of the Arizona Diamondbacks, who in 2001 drafted him in the 20th round, 608th pick overall. Bonine did not sign, and transferred to Washington State University for the 2001–2002 season, going 8–8 with a 6.36 earned run average (ERA) and being named an honorable mention for the All-Pac-10 team.

For his senior year (2002–2003), Bonine transferred to the University of Nevada, Reno where he went 5–6 with a 5.84 ERA. Following graduation, the San Diego Padres drafted Bonine in the 23rd round; 671st overall. This time Bonine signed and was assigned to the Single-A Eugene Emeralds.

== Professional career ==
=== San Diego Padres ===
Bonine made 31 appearances with Eugene in a relief role, going 1–2 with a 3.78 ERA and 12 saves. At the end of the season, Bonine was named to the Northwest League's All-Star team. For 2004, the Padres sent Bonine to the Single-A Fort Wayne Wizards, where he posted a 1.98 ERA over five starts before being promoted to the Single-A Lake Elsinore Storm. There he started 21 games with mixed results: a 5–10 record and an ERA over 5. Returning to the Storm for the 2005 season, Bonine went 5–6 with an ERA of 6.47, but pitched a gem in the post-season: a 4–1 win over the San Jose Giants in which he threw 8 1/3 innings. The Padres assigned Bonine to the Triple-A Portland Beavers, where he made one appearance. In December 2005, the Detroit Tigers selected Bonine in the Rule 5 draft and he was sent to the Single-A Lakeland Tigers.

=== Detroit Tigers ===
Bonine spent the 2006 season in Lakeland where he pitched both as starter and reliever. Over the course of 42 appearances he amassed a 4–5 record, plus one save, with an ERA of 3.90. Pleased, the Tigers promoted Bonine to the Double-A Erie SeaWolves for the 2007 season, where he posted a 14–5 record with a 3.90 ERA. His walks-per-9 innings average (1.34) led the Eastern League. For the 2008 season, the Tigers promoted Bonine to the Triple-A Toledo Mud Hens, where got off to a 9–2 start before being called up to the majors to replace struggling pitcher Dontrelle Willis and made his major league debut on June 14, 2008, against the Los Angeles Dodgers. The Tigers optioned Bonine back to Erie after a July 9, 2008, start against the Cleveland Indians.

Bonine started the 2009 with the Tigers, but was sent down to Mud Hens on April 27 to make room for Joel Zumaya, who returned from the disabled list. In four appearances Bonine posted a 9.00 ERA but did not earn a decision. In Toledo Bonine got off to a strong start, recording a 1.88 ERA over his first four starts.

Bonine made 47 appearances (one start) for Detroit during the 2010 campaign, compiling a 4-1 record and 4.63 ERA with 26 strikeouts over 68 innings of work. On November 4, 2010, Bonine was removed from the 40-man roster and sent outright to Triple-A Toledo; he subsequently elected free agency.

=== Philadelphia Phillies ===
On November 12, 2010, Bonine signed a minor league contract with the Philadelphia Phillies organization. He made 11 starts (10 appearances) for the Triple-A Lehigh Valley IronPigs, registering a 3-4 record and 5.16 ERA with 44 strikeouts across 45 1/3 innings pitched. Bonine elected free agency following the season on November 2, 2012.

=== Arizona Diamondbacks ===
On November 6, 2012, Bonine signed a minor league contract with the Arizona Diamondbacks. He made four appearances (one start) for the Triple-A Reno Aces, recording a 6.30 ERA with six strikeouts over 10 innings of work. Bonine was released by the Diamondbacks organization on April 20, 2013.

=== San Diego Padres (second stint) ===
On April 20, 2013, Bonine signed a minor league contract with the San Diego Padres organization. Bonine began developing a knuckleball in an attempt to make it back to the major leagues. In his time with the organization, he appeared for the rookie-level Arizona League Padres, Double-A San Antonio Missions, and Triple-A Tucson Padres. Bonine elected free agency following the season on November 4.

== See also ==
- Rule 5 draft results
