= Enrique González (baseball) =

Venezuelan baseball player (born 1982)

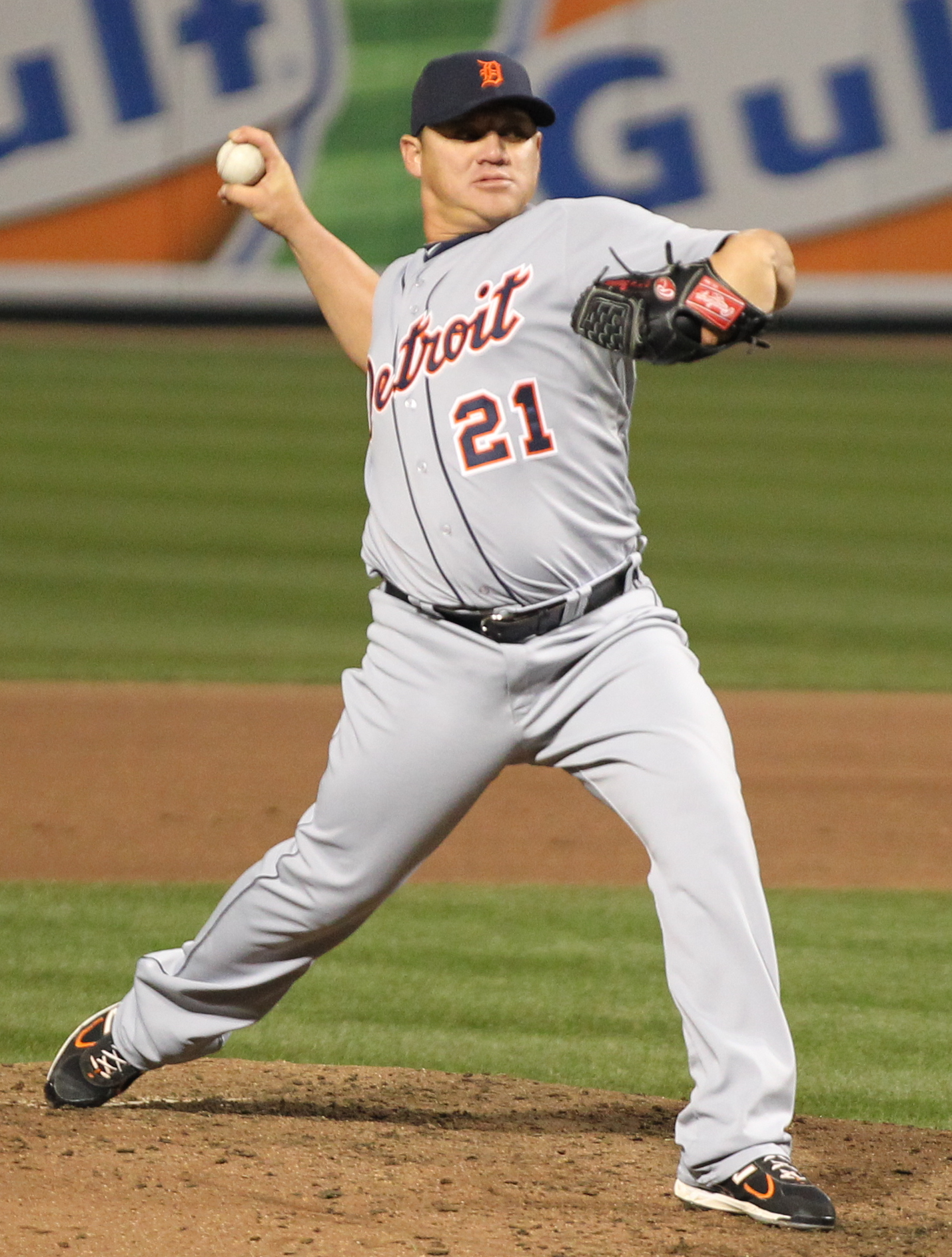
- González with the Detroit Tigers
- Pitcher
- Born: July 14, 1982 (age 43); Ciudad Bolívar, Venezuela
- Batted: Right Threw: Right

Professional debut
- MLB: May 28, 2006, for the Arizona Diamondbacks
- NPB: March 31, 2012, for the Saitama Seibu Lions

Last appearance
- MLB: June 8, 2011, for the Detroit Tigers
- NPB: August 4, 2012, for the Saitama Seibu Lions

MLB statistics
- Win–loss record: 4–8
- Earned run average: 5.81
- Strikeouts: 84

NPB statistics
- Win–loss record: 3–3
- Earned run average: 7.04
- Strikeouts: 16
- Stats at Baseball Reference

Teams
- Arizona Diamondbacks (2006–2007); San Diego Padres (2008); Boston Red Sox (2009); Detroit Tigers (2010–2011); Saitama Seibu Lions (2012)

Enrique César González Lugo (born July 14, 1982) is a Venezuelan former professional baseball pitcher.

== Playing career ==
González made his first start against the Cincinnati Reds on May 28, 2006, pitching six innings for the Arizona Diamondbacks and giving up only one run. He was in the rotation for a majority of the season, but was inconsistent and pitched out of the bullpen for the last few weeks of the season. On September 17, 2007, he was claimed off waivers by the Washington Nationals. On February 5, 2008, González was claimed off waivers by the San Diego Padres. After appearing in four games, he was sent outright to the minors on April 15. He became a free agent at the end of the season. He signed a minor league deal with the Boston Red Sox in December 2008 and was invited to spring training. He spent most of the 2009 season in Triple A before being called up on August 8, 2009, and designated for assignment the next day.

On January 11, 2010, González signed a minor league contract with the Detroit Tigers with an invite to spring training. González was called up on June 10, 2010, to replace the injured Ryan Perry.

The Tigers purchased his contract on May 22, 2011. He was outrighted to Triple-A on June 13.

He spent the summer 2014 in Italy, playing for Rimini Baseball.

During the winters, he is usually back in Venezuela to play for Tiburones de La Guaira.

As of 2025, he is currently pitching coach for the DSL Angels the Dominican Summer League affiliate of the Los Angeles Angels.

== See also ==
- List of Major League Baseball players from Venezuela
