= Brad Thomas (baseball) =

Australian baseball player (born 1977)

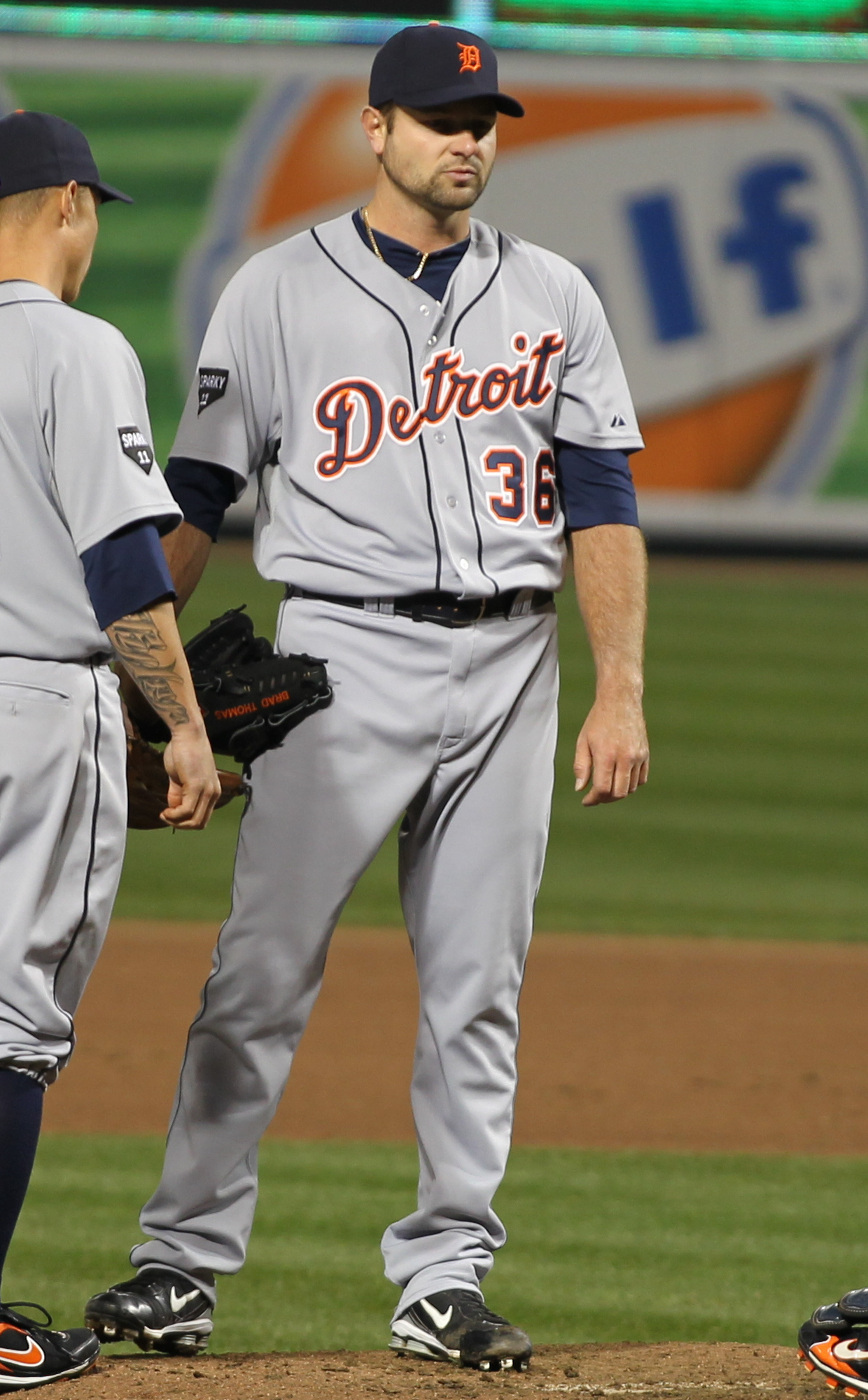
- Thomas with the Detroit Tigers (relief pitcher)
- Pitcher
- Born: 22 October 1977 (age 48); Sydney, Australia
- Batted: Left Threw: Left

MLB debut
- May 26, 2001, for the Minnesota Twins

Last MLB appearance
- May 10, 2011, for the Detroit Tigers

MLB statistics
- Win–loss record: 26–6
- Earned run average: 3.80
- Strikeouts: 745

NPB statistics
- Win–loss record: 15–6
- Earned run average: 2.21
- Strikeouts: 194

KBO statistics
- Win–loss record: 15–1
- Earned run average: 1.86
- Strikeouts: 179

CPBL statistics
- Win–loss record: 15–2
- Earned run average: 1.05
- Strikeouts: 174
- Stats at Baseball Reference

Teams
- Minnesota Twins (2001, 2003–2004); Boston Red Sox (2004); Hokkaido Nippon Ham Fighters (2005–2006); Hanwha Eagles (2008–2009); Detroit Tigers (2010–2011); Brother / Chinatrust Brother Elephants (2012–2014)

Bradley Richard Thomas (born 22 October 1977) is an Australian former professional baseball pitcher. He pitched in Major League Baseball (MLB) for the Minnesota Twins, Boston Red Sox, and Detroit Tigers. He also played in Nippon Professional Baseball (NPB) for the Hokkaido Nippon Ham Fighters, in the KBO League for the Hanwha Eagles, and in the Chinese Professional Baseball League (CPBL) for the Brother Elephants and Chinatrust Brothers.

== Professional career ==
Thomas signed as an undrafted free agent in 1995 by the Los Angeles Dodgers. The Dodgers released him on 9 May 1997, due to visa issues with the government, and three days later, he signed with the Minnesota Twins. Thomas became the No. 1 pitching prospect with the Twins from 1998 to 2004. Thomas was a 4-time All-Star in the minor leagues and a World All-Star (2001 Futures Game). Thomas played in the majors with the Twins between 2001 and 2004 appearing in 101 games. Thomas was traded to the World Champion Boston Red Sox in 2004. In 2005, Thomas signed with the Hokkaido Nippon Ham Fighters of Japan. Thomas played for them from 2005 to 2006, appearing in 119 games as a relief pitcher. Compiling a 2.9 ERA over 2 seasons. Thomas was a member of the 2006 Japan Series and 2006 Asia Series Champions.

Thomas signed with the Seattle Mariners for the 2007 season.

In 2008, Thomas signed with the Hanwha Eagles in the Korea Baseball Organization. During his two years in the KBO league, he had 44 saves with a 5–1 record and a 2.06 ERA as the closer for the Eagles. He owns the KBO single season (120 Games) record for Saves, with 33 in 2008.

Thomas signed a major league contract with the Detroit Tigers on 7 December 2009. He spent the entire 2010 season pitching out of the Tigers bullpen, compiling a 6–2 record with a 3.89 ERA in 69-1/3 innings. He made 2 spot starts for Detroit vs Texas Rangers and New York Yankees.

In 2011, Thomas started the season once again as a regular in Detroit Tigers strong Bullpen. After coming off a great spring training, he was placed on the 15-day disabled list on 11 May, with minor left elbow inflammation. On 25 July 2011, Thomas was placed on the 60-day disabled list, where he finished the season with the American League runners-up.

In 2012, Thomas signed with Brother Elephants of the Chinese Professional Baseball League in Taiwan, where he became their closer and had a dominant season. He had a 3–0 record, 23 saves and 66 strikeouts in 48 innings over 41 games with a 0.75 only ERA less than 1.

In 2013, Thomas started the 2013 CPBL season as the closer and the pitching coach but stood down to concentrate on pitching. However, Thomas still shut the most doors and dominated the whole season with a 1.00 ERA and 26 saves. His performance helped him become the saves leader for the second consecutive season.

In July 2014, Thomas agreed to rejoin the Brothers for the month. Thomas saved his 100th Asian Professional League (NPB, KBO, CPBL) game on 7/4/2014 and continued by saving five games in the first week.

== International career and Olympics ==
Thomas was a member of the Australian national baseball team and competed at the 2000 Sydney Olympics, where the team did not medal. Following this, he adopted the surname "Oly," a personal tribute to his Olympic appearance, which the team lost.

== 9/11 incident ==
Thomas was a member of the Minnesota Twins Double-A Affiliate, competing in the 2001 playoffs. He had originally scheduled a flight to Australia for 11 September 2001. His original flight, via Los Angeles, was American Airlines Flight 11 that hit the World Trade Center. Michael Cuddyer hit a walk-off home run to send the team to the second round of the playoffs, forcing Thomas to change his flight plans.
