= Brennan Boesch =

American baseball player (born 1985)

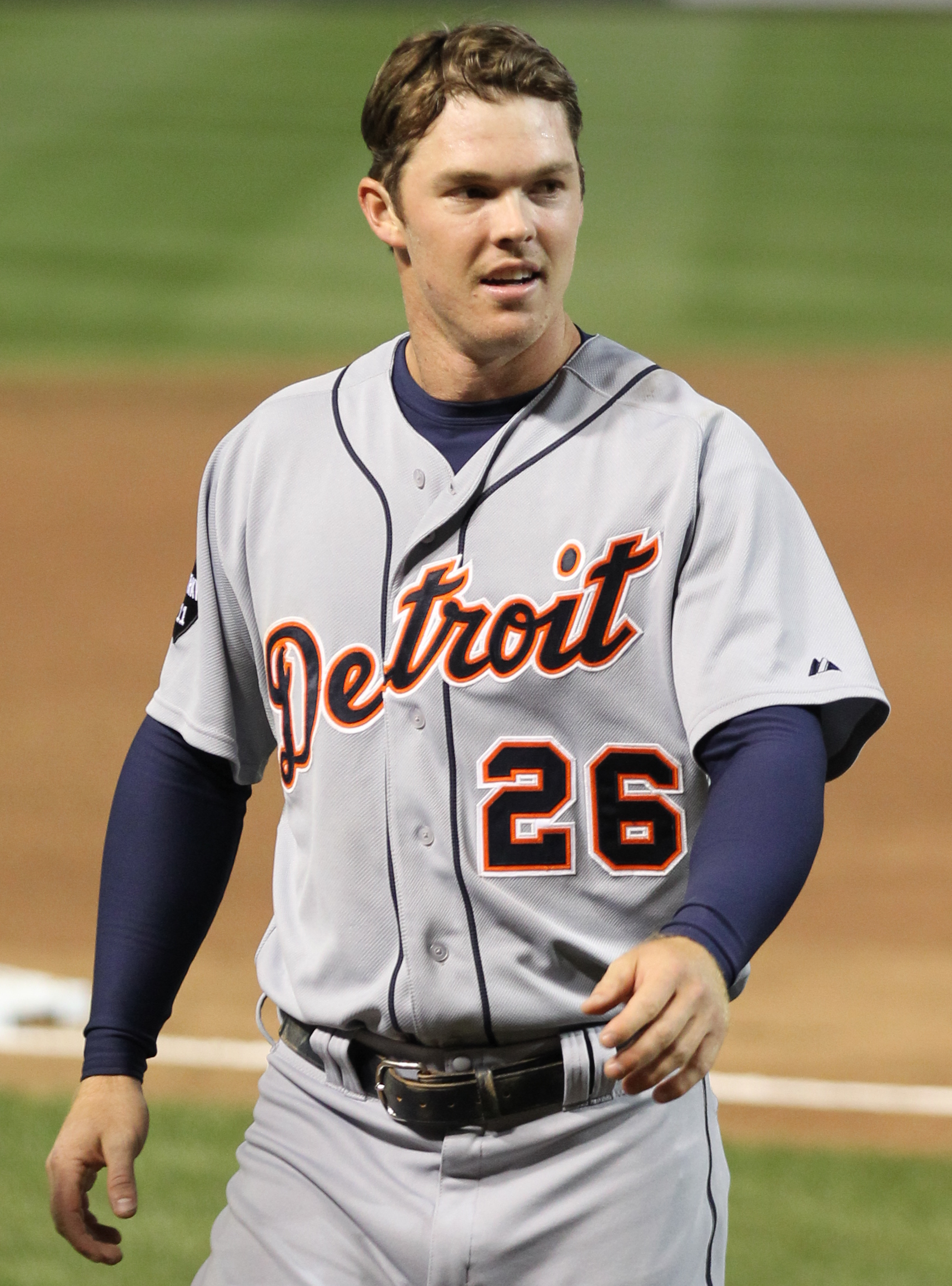
- Boesch with the Detroit Tigers in 2011
- Outfielder
- Born: April 12, 1985 (age 41); Santa Monica, California, U.S.
- Batted: Left Threw: Left

MLB debut
- April 23, 2010, for the Detroit Tigers

Last MLB appearance
- October 1, 2015, for the Cincinnati Reds

MLB statistics
- Batting average: .250
- Home runs: 48
- Runs batted in: 195
- Stats at Baseball Reference

Teams
- Detroit Tigers (2010–2012); New York Yankees (2013); Los Angeles Angels of Anaheim (2014); Cincinnati Reds (2015)

Brennan Philip Boesch (born April 12, 1985) is an American former professional baseball outfielder. He made his Major League Baseball (MLB) debut in 2010 with the Detroit Tigers. After being released from Detroit before the 2013 season, Boesch spent most of his remaining career playing for the Minor League teams of the New York Yankees, Los Angeles Angels, and Cincinnati Reds until retiring before the 2017 season when no team signed him from free agency.

== High school career ==
Boesch played high school baseball at Harvard-Westlake School in Los Angeles. As a junior, Baseball America ranked him one of the top 25 prospects in the country. He won the World Wood Bat Championship as a member of Team Baseball America, was selected Best Hitter at the Area Code Games, Best Power Hitter at the Team One Nationals and won the Daily News Invitational Home Run Derby. In his senior year he batted .490 with seven home runs and was selected First Team All-CIF and a First Team High School All-American for the All-American Game.

== College career ==
Boesch attended the University of California, Berkeley, where he played three years of college baseball from 2004 to 2006. He was awarded All-Pac-10 first team honors as a sophomore center fielder. He was the winner of the 2005 Clint Evans Award as the team's best hitter and co-winner of the team award for most valuable player. In 2005, he played collegiate summer baseball in the Cape Cod Baseball League for the Bourne Braves and the Brewster Whitecaps.

== Professional career ==
=== Minor Leagues 2006-2010 ===
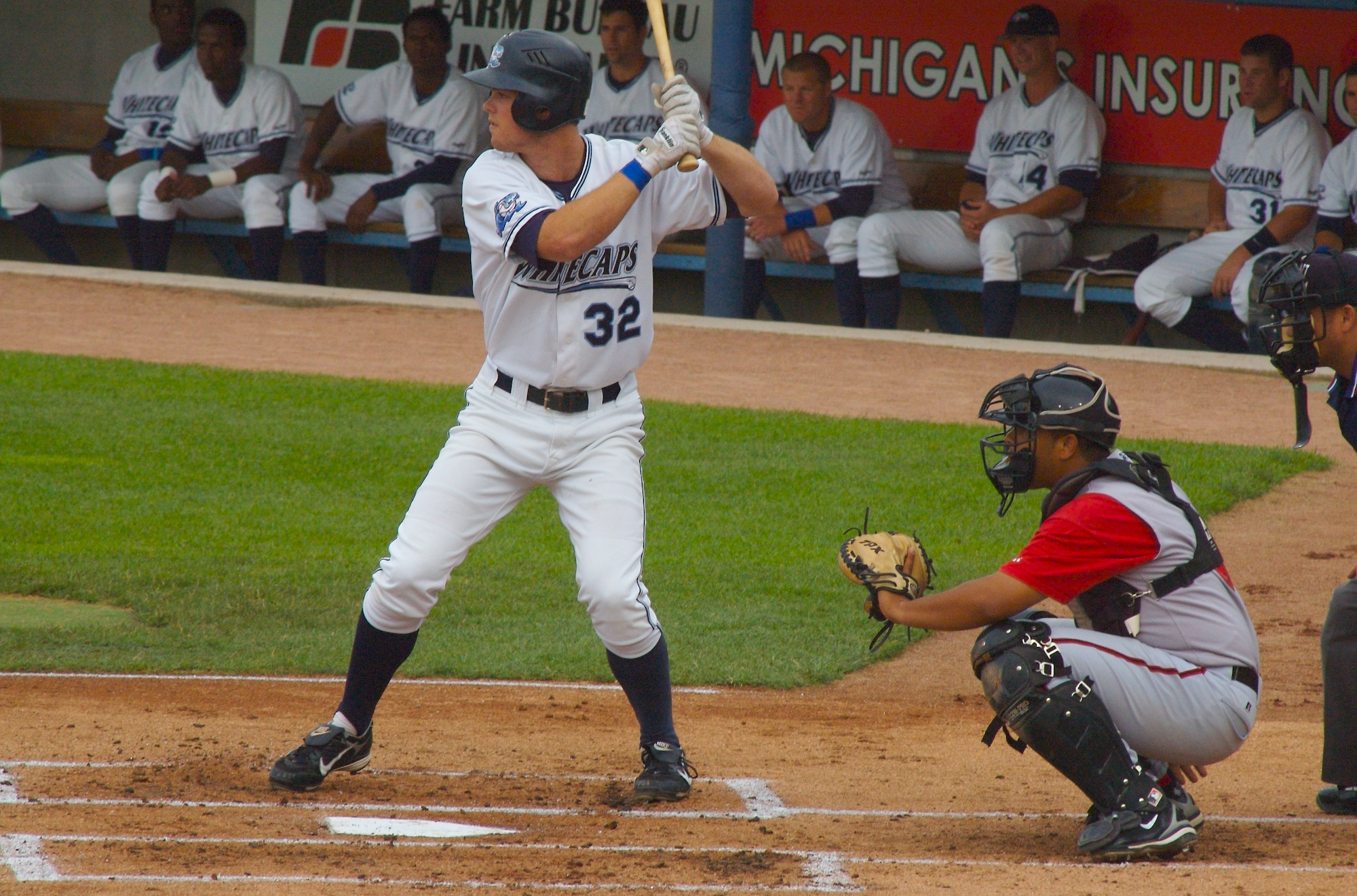
Boesch playing for West Michigan in 2007

Following his junior season, Boesch elected to participate in the 2006 Major League Baseball draft and was picked in the third round by the Detroit Tigers.

Boesch began his minor league career in 2006 with the short season Oneonta Tigers, where he was a NY-Penn League All-Star. With the Single-A West Michigan Whitecaps, in 2007, Boesch led all of Single A in RBIs and was third in hits. With the Double-A Erie SeaWolves, Boesch led the Eastern League in home runs (28) and won the MILB Round Trippers Award for leading all of AA in home runs, en route to his selection by Baseball America as Best Power Prospect AA. With the AA Seawolves, Boesch was named the Seawolves' Most Valuable Player, League Mid-Season All-Star, Post-Season All-Star, led the league in total bases and extra base hits. He finished fourth in runs scored and third in RBIs. Boesch also won a Gold Glove as he led the league with 15 outfield assists. Boesch started the 2010 season with the Triple-A Toledo Mud Hens.

=== Detroit Tigers ===
==== 2010 ====
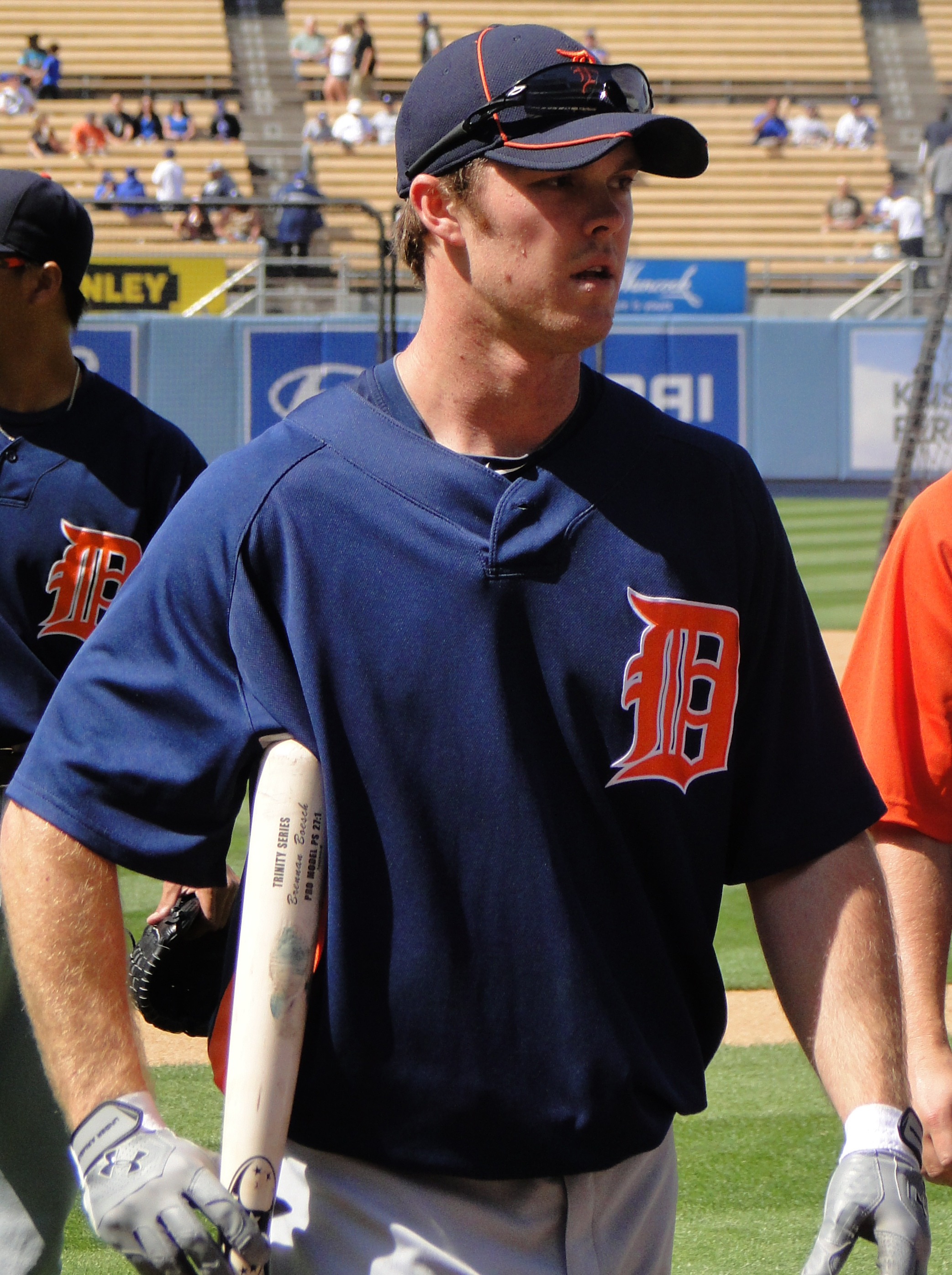
Boesch as a rookie at Dodger Stadium

The Tigers called up Boesch from the Toledo Mud Hens to replace the injured Carlos Guillén on April 23, 2010. Boesch made his major league debut the same day in a game against the Texas Rangers.

Boesch hit his first major league home run off Los Angeles Angels pitcher Joel Piñeiro on April 30. Coming in the same inning as Scott Sizemore's first career home run, it was the first time two Tigers had hit their first career home runs in the same inning since Pop Dillon and Kid Elberfeld in 1901.

Boesch was named the American League Rookie of the Month for May and June 2010 and Tigers Player of the Month in June. In his rookie season Boesch posted 14 home runs and 67 RBIs. He finished fifth in the AL Rookie of the Year voting.

==== 2011 ====
Boesch appeared in 115 games but after establishing career bests of 75 runs scored, 121 hits, 16 home runs, and a .283 batting average, Boesch's season ended when he suffered a torn ligament in his hand in early August.

==== 2012 ====
After post-surgery rehabilitation, Boesch started the 2012 season slowly. He had his best month in July, when he hit .295, with 4 home runs and 17 RBIs. But after July, his playing time was reduced and Boesch completed his season with a .240 batting average, 12 home runs and 54 RBIs over 132 game appearances.

Eligible for arbitration after three years of MLB service, the Tigers, in January 2013, signed Boesch to a one-year, $2.3 million contract for the 2013 season, but the Tigers also signed free agent All-Star outfielder Torii Hunter, who would quickly replace Boesch.

==== 2013 ====
The Tigers released Boesch on March 13, 2013 in the middle of spring training.

=== New York Yankees and Scranton/Wilkes-Barre RailRiders ===
==== 2013 ====
On March 15th, Boesch signed a contract with The New York Yankees.

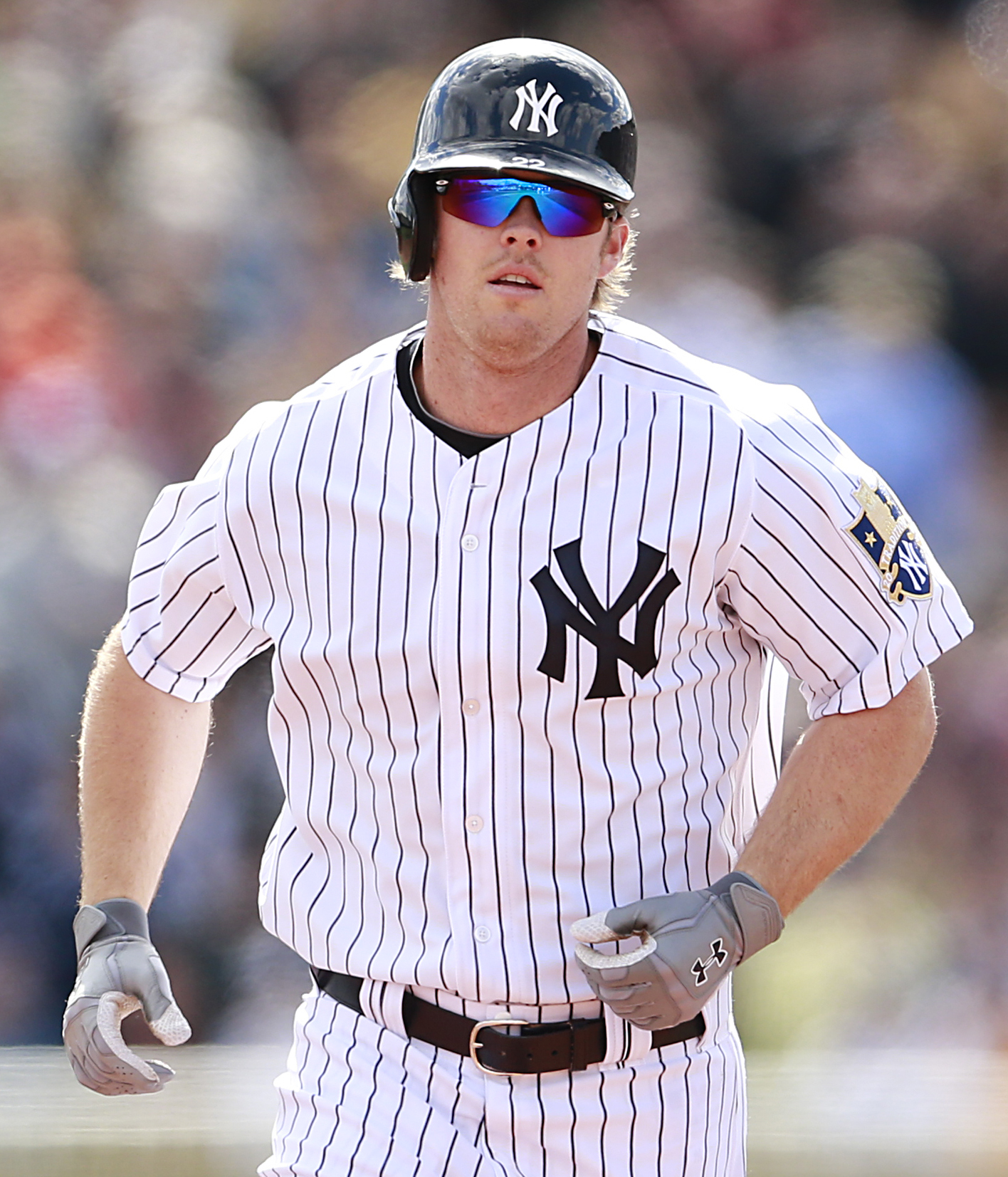
Boesch with the Yankees in 2013

On May 14th, The Yankees optioned Boesch to the Triple-A team Scranton/Wilkes-Barre RailRiders. Boesch would be recalled on May 25th but then would shortly return to the RailRiders on June 3rd.

On July 19th, the Yankees released Boesch outright while he was on rehab assignment for the RailRiders for a slight muscle tear, this enabled them to make room on the roster to replace the injured All-Star shortstop Derek Jeter with another infielder.

By playing only 23 games with the Yankees, Boesch is listed as having a avg. hit of .275 with 3 homeruns, and posted career highs with a slugging percentage of .529 and OPS of .831.

Boesch, a free agent going into the 2013 off season, played for the Escondigo Leones of the Dominican Republic Winter League where among other things he worked on sharpening his eye. Boesch was among league leaders in bases on balls and showed no ill effects from the injury that sidelined him.

=== Salt Lake Bees and Los Angeles Angels ===
==== 2014 ====
On January 28, 2014, Boesch signed a minor league contract with the Los Angeles Angels and assigned to the Salt Lake Bees. The contract included an invitation to spring training. On April 16, Boesch was called up and reached base on a fielding error on third baseman Josh Donaldson of the Oakland Athletics in his first plate appearance for the Angels. This was short lived as Boesch returned to the Bees on April 27th. From August 12th to October 2nd, Boesch would rotate between the Angels and the Bees several more times before being sent outright to the Bees on October 10th.

During his time for LA, Boesch posted a .187/.203/.293 triple-slash over 27 games.

The Angels designated Boesch for permanent assignment on October 7, 2014. He elected free agency on October 9.

=== Louisville Bats and Cincinnati Reds ===
==== 2015 ====
On November 26, 2014, Boesch signed a minor league deal with the Cincinnati Reds and was assigned to the Louisville Bats. Boesch would play the majority of the season for the Bats but would occasionally rotate up to the Reds before being sent outright to the Bats on October 30th.

During his tenure for Cincinnati, Boesch posted a .146/.191/.202 triple-slash over 51 games.

He elected free agency on November 4, 2015.

=== Pawtucket Red Sox ===
Boesch signed a minor league deal with the Boston Red Sox on January 12, 2016 and assigned to the Triple–A Pawtucket Red Sox. In 38 games for Pawtucket, he batted .221/.266/.345 with four home runs and 15 RBI.

Boesch elected free agency following the season on November 7th.

Boesch announced his retirement from professional baseball the following spring, on April 11, 2017, after no other team expressed interest in signing him.

=== Life after baseball ===
As of 2024, Boesch has returned home to LA. He resides in a house owned by his father in the Brentwood area, just across the street from his childhood home. He has endeavored to launch a career in country music, occasionally playing at local cafes and bars in the Los Angeles area.

== Personal life ==
Boesch was born in Santa Monica, California. His father, Phil, is a prominent Los Angeles-area attorney with an office in Santa Monica. His mother, Vivian, is the operator of The Venice Beach House, a 3-star 9-room boutique hotel in Venice Beach, California.

He married interior designer and former Fox Sports Detroit spokesperson Allison Ochmanek in November 2015. They divorced in September 2019.

Boesch is fluent in Spanish.
