= Andy Oliver =

American baseball player (born 1987)

- Pitcher
- Born: December 3, 1987 (age 38); Vermilion, Ohio, U.S.
- Batted: Left Threw: Left

MLB debut
- June 25, 2010, for the Detroit Tigers

Last MLB appearance
- June 3, 2011, for the Detroit Tigers

MLB statistics
- Win–loss record: 0–5
- Earned run average: 7.11
- Strikeouts: 23
- Stats at Baseball Reference

Teams
- Detroit Tigers (2010–2011)

Andy Oliver
Medal record

Men's baseball

Representing United States

World University Championship
Gold medal – first place	2008 Brno	National team

Andrew Allen Oliver (born December 3, 1987) is an American former professional baseball pitcher. He played in Major League Baseball (MLB) for the Detroit Tigers.

== College career ==
Oliver was drafted by the Minnesota Twins in the 17th round of the 2006 Major League Baseball draft, but did not sign, opting instead to attend Oklahoma State University, where he played on the Oklahoma State Cowboys baseball team. In 2007, he played collegiate summer baseball with the Wareham Gatemen of the Cape Cod Baseball League.

Oliver was ruled ineligible by the NCAA in 2008, resulting from an allegation by a potential agent. He sued the NCAA, and received a settlement of $750,000.

== Professional career ==
=== Detroit Tigers ===
Oliver was drafted by the Detroit Tigers in the second round (58th overall) of the 2009 Major League Baseball draft. He made his professional debut in 2010, splitting his minor league season between the Double-A Erie SeaWolves and Triple-A Toledo Mud Hens.

Oliver made his major league debut on June 25, 2010. He was sent back down to Triple-A Toledo on July 19. In five starts for Detroit during his rookie campaign, Oliver struggled to an 0-4 record and 7.36 ERA with 18 strikeouts over 22 innings of work.

On May 28, 2011, Oliver was recalled to the majors again, to fill in for the injured Phil Coke. He made two starts for Detroit, posting an 0-1 record and 6.52 ERA with five strikeouts across 9 2/3 innings pitched.

=== Pittsburgh Pirates ===
On December 5, 2012, Oliver was traded to the Pittsburgh Pirates in exchange for Ramón Cabrera. He made 29 appearances (24 starts) for the Triple-A Indianapolis Indians during the 2013 season, compiling a 5-4 record and 4.05 ERA with 138 strikeouts across 124 1/3 innings pitched.

On March 29, 2014, Oliver was removed from the 40-man roster and sent outright to Indianapolis. He made 48 appearances out of the bullpen for Indianapolis, posting a 3-4 record and 2.53 ERA with 85 strikeouts and 13 saves over 64 innings of work.

=== Tampa Bay Rays ===
On December 11, 2014, Oliver was selected by the Philadelphia Phillies in the second round of the Rule 5 draft. On April 2, 2015, Oliver was removed from the 40-man roster and sent outright to the Triple-A Lehigh Valley IronPigs; he subsequently rejected the assignment and elected free agency two days later. General manager Rubén Amaro Jr. expressed frustration with Oliver's decision to depart the organization, stating that Oliver would have been on a short list of potential call-ups.

On April 14, 2015, Oliver signed a minor league contract with the Tampa Bay Rays organization. He pitched for the Durham Bulls of the Triple-A International League, logging a 1-1 record and 3.86 ERA with 32 strikeouts and one save in 25 games. On July 3, Oliver opted out of his contract and was granted free agency.

=== Baltimore Orioles ===
On July 17, 2015, Oliver signed a minor league contract with the Baltimore Orioles organization. He made 16 appearances for the Triple-A Norfolk Tides, logging a 3.72 ERA with 34 strikeouts in 29 innings pitched.

On January 18, 2016, Oliver re-signed with the Orioles on a minor league contract. Oliver opted out of his contract on June 3. On June 16, Oliver re-signed with Baltimore on a new minor league contract. In 28 games (14 starts) for Norfolk in 2016, Oliver registered a 3.43 ERA with 84 strikeouts in 86 2/3 innings of work. He elected free agency following the season on November 7.

=== Milwaukee Brewers ===
On December 15, 2016, Oliver signed a minor league contract with the Milwaukee Brewers that included an invitation to spring training. In 16 games for the Triple-A Colorado Springs Sky Sox, he struggled to a 7.59 ERA with 20 strikeouts across 21 1/3 innings pitched. Oliver was released by the Brewers organization on June 22, 2017.

== See also ==
- Rule 5 draft results
