= Max St. Pierre =

Canadian baseball player (born 1980)

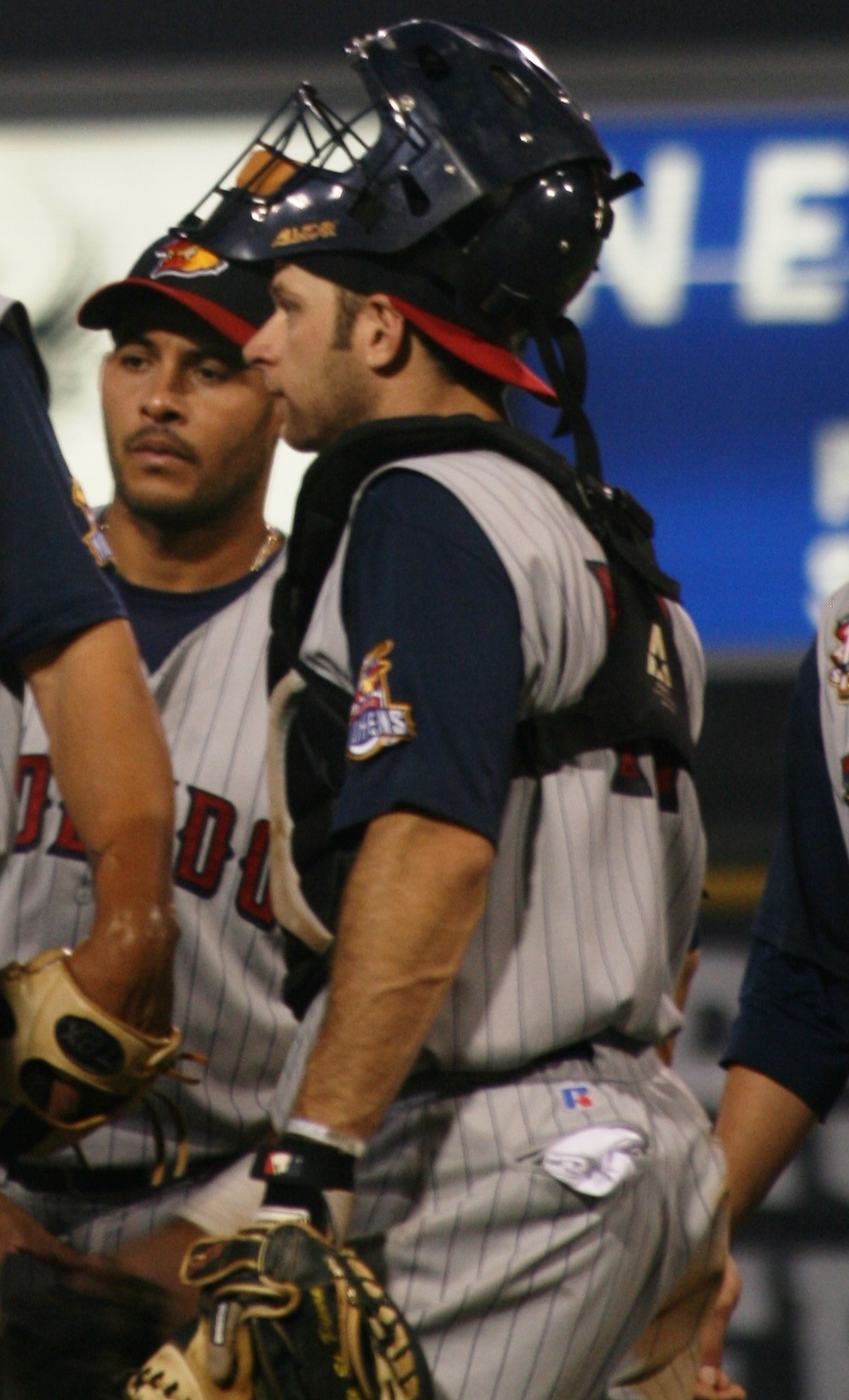
- St. Pierre with the Toledo Mud Hens in 2008
- Catcher
- Born: April 17, 1980 (age 45); Quebec City, Quebec, Canada
- Batted: Right Threw: Right

MLB debut
- September 4, 2010, for the Detroit Tigers

Last MLB appearance
- October 2, 2010, for the Detroit Tigers

MLB statistics
- Batting average: .222
- Home runs: 0
- Runs batted in: 0
- Stats at Baseball Reference

Teams
- Detroit Tigers (2010)

Maxim Joseph St. Pierre (born April 17, 1980) is a Canadian former professional baseball catcher. He played in Major League Baseball (MLB) for the Detroit Tigers.

== Playing career ==
=== Detroit Tigers ===
==== Minor leagues ====
Prior to being called up to the Tigers, St. Pierre spent 14 seasons in the minor leagues. He played in the Tigers minor league system from 1997 to 2010, with the exception of 2007, which was spent in the Milwaukee Brewers system. He signed with the Kansas City Royals before the season, but was traded to the Brewers on March 27 in exchange for Ben Hendrickson.

==== Major leagues ====
St. Pierre received his first promotion to the major leagues on September 1, 2010. He recorded his first career hit on September 4 in a 6-4 victory over the Kansas City Royals. He would finish the season appearing in six games and getting two hits in nine at-bats. On November 4, St. Pierre was removed from the 40-man roster and sent outright to the Triple-A Toledo Mud Hens; he subsequently elected free agency.

The Tigers re-signed St. Pierre to a minor league contract on November 8, 2010. He made 77 appearances for Toledo during the 2011 season, slashing .207/.257/.284 with four home runs and 25 RBI. St. Pierre elected free agency following the season on November 2, 2011.

=== Boston Red Sox ===
On January 2, 2012, St. Pierre signed a minor league contract with the Boston Red Sox organization. He was released by the club in spring training.

=== Québec Capitales ===
St. Pierre converted into a pitcher and spent the 2012 season with the Québec Capitales of the Canadian American Association of Professional Baseball. In 11 appearances for Québec, he posted a 1-0 record and 10.80 ERA with 12 strikeouts across 11 2/3 innings pitched. St. Pierre became a free agent after the season.

== Coaching career ==
St. Pierre is currently the bullpen coach for the Quebec Capitales of the Can-Am League.
