= Ryan Perry =

American baseball player (born 1987)

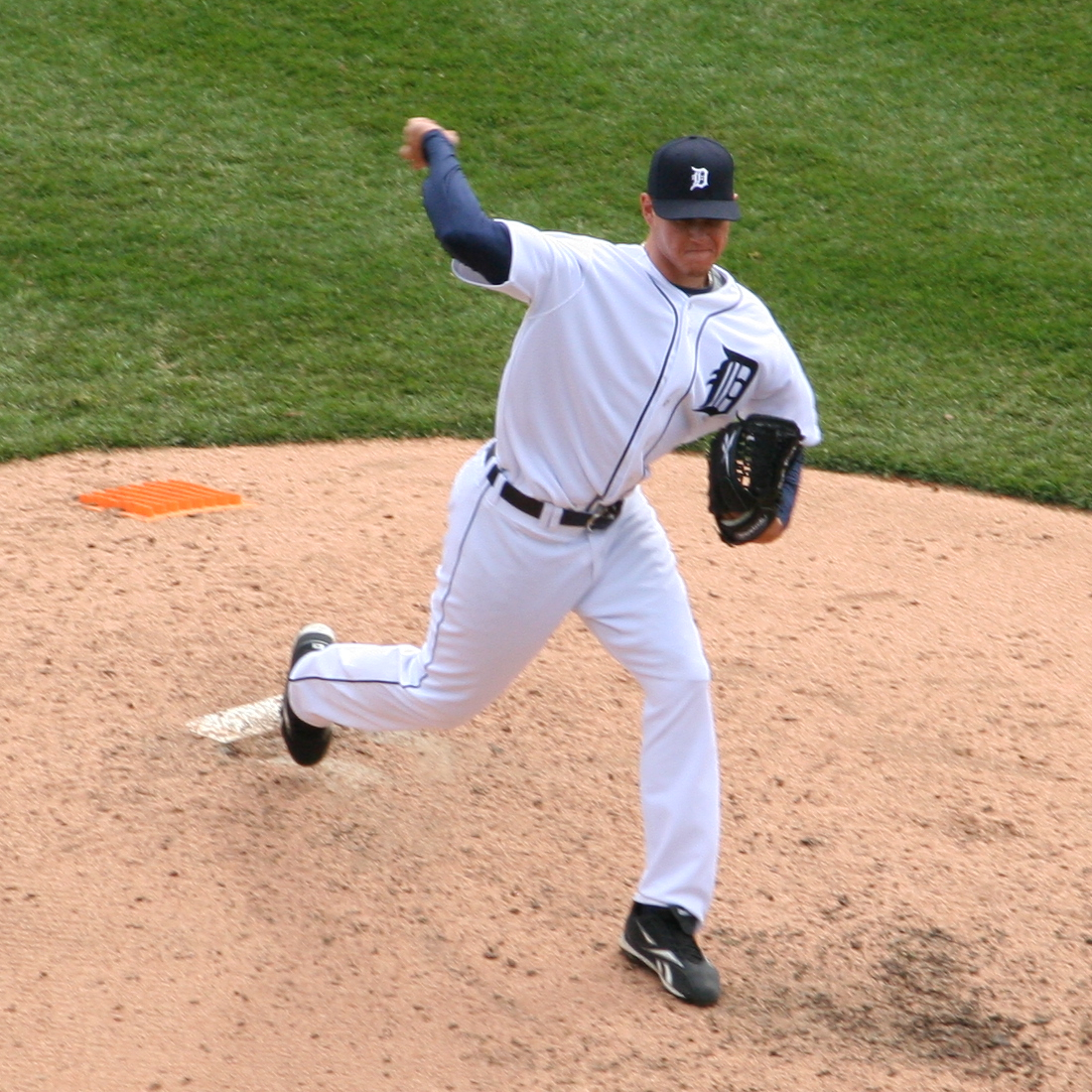
- Perry with the Detroit Tigers
- Relief pitcher
- Born: February 13, 1987 (age 38); Pomona, California, U.S.
- Batted: Right Threw: Right

MLB debut
- April 8, 2009, for the Detroit Tigers

Last MLB appearance
- May 30, 2012, for the Washington Nationals

MLB statistics
- Win–loss record: 6–6
- Earned run average: 4.36
- Strikeouts: 132
- Stats at Baseball Reference

Teams
- Detroit Tigers (2009–2011); Washington Nationals (2012)

Ryan Keith Perry (born February 13, 1987) is an American retired Major League Baseball pitcher. He played for the Detroit Tigers and Washington Nationals.

== Amateur career ==
Born in Pomona, California, Perry played collegiate baseball at the University of Arizona. While at Arizona, he pitched alongside future Tigers teammate Daniel Schlereth. In 2007, he played collegiate summer baseball for the Orleans Cardinals of the Cape Cod Baseball League, where he was named a league all-star, and earned the save in the annual all-star game.

== Professional career ==
=== Detroit Tigers ===
Perry was drafted by the Detroit Tigers with the 21st overall selection in the 2008 Major League Baseball draft. At the end of 2008 Baseball America named him the Detroit Tigers second best prospect, behind Rick Porcello. On April 1, 2009, it was announced that Perry would make the opening day roster for the Tigers for the 2009 season.

On April 8, Perry made his major league debut against the Toronto Blue Jays. He threw a scoreless eighth inning in the Tigers' 5–1 victory.

On June 8, Perry was sent to the Toledo Mud Hens when Jeremy Bonderman came off the disabled list.

He began the 2010 season as a middle relief pitcher for Detroit. He recorded his first career win May 1 against the Los Angeles Angels by pitching two-thirds of an inning.

On June 10, Perry was placed on the 15-day disabled list with right biceps tendinitis. After rehab in Toledo, he was called back up on July 3.

Perry posted a 3.79 ERA over 61 2/3 innings in Detroit as a rookie, walking 38 and striking out 60. He recorded two saves the following season, allowing 55 hits over 62 2/3 innings, but his strikeout rate fell precipitously, a trend that continued in 2011 and beyond.

After starting the season with a 12.19 ERA through 13 appearances, Perry was optioned to Toledo on May 28, 2011, to make room for spot starter Andrew Oliver.

=== Washington Nationals ===
On December 9, 2011, Perry was traded by the Tigers to the Washington Nationals for Collin Balester. He was sent outright to Double-A Harrisburg Senators on June 27, 2013. He was released on July 21, 2014.

=== Detroit Tigers (second stint) ===
On February 24, 2015, Perry signed a minor league contract with the Detroit Tigers. He was released by the Toledo Mud Hens on June 9.
