= Robbie Weinhardt =

American baseball player (born 1985)

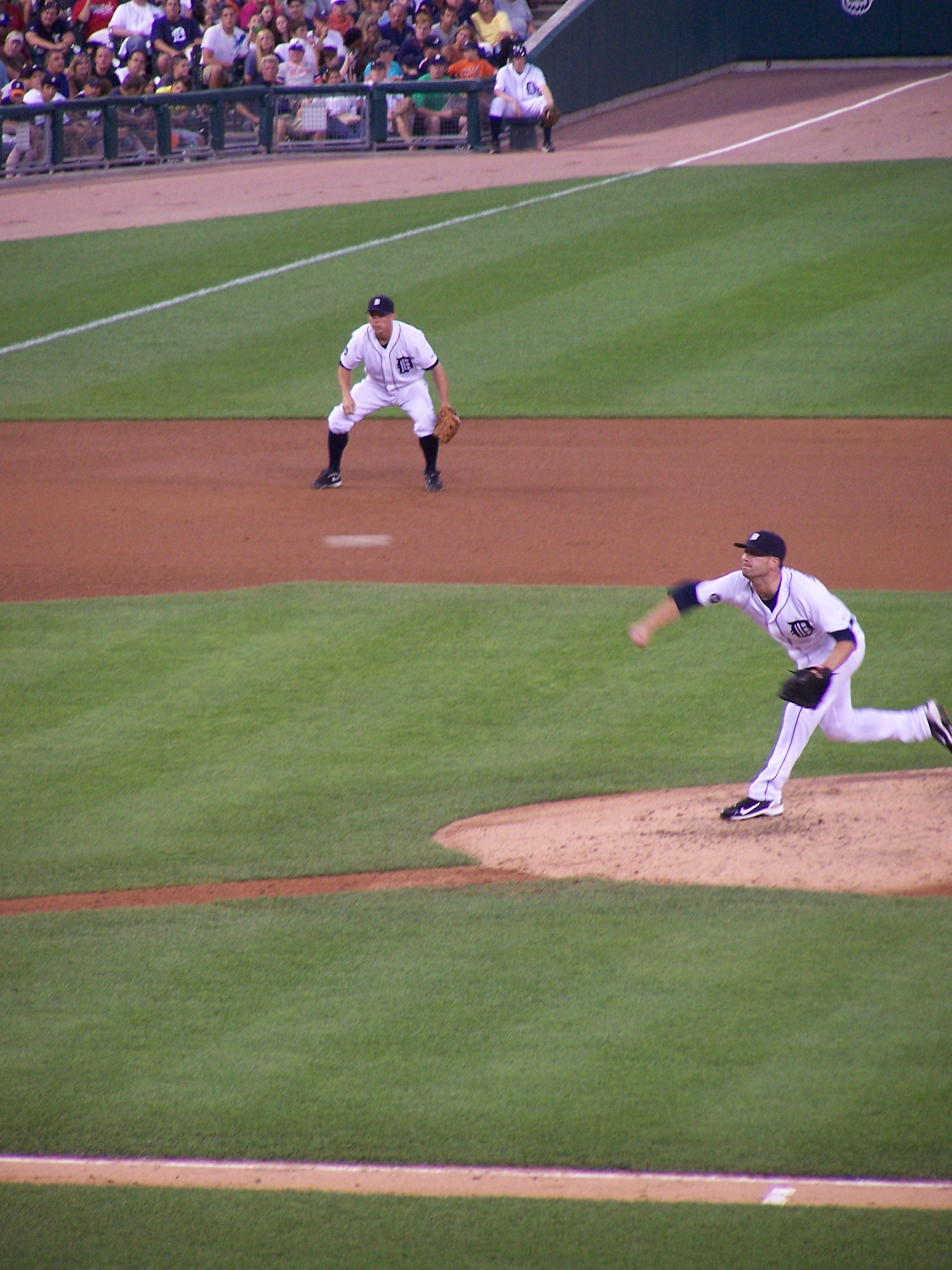
- Throwing his first career strikeout
- Pitcher
- Born: December 8, 1985 (age 40); Chicago, Illinois, U.S.
- Batted: Right Threw: Right

MLB debut
- July 7, 2010, for the Detroit Tigers

Last MLB appearance
- April 10, 2011, for the Detroit Tigers

MLB statistics
- Win–loss record: 2–2
- Earned run average: 6.39
- Strikeouts: 22
- Stats at Baseball Reference

Teams
- Detroit Tigers (2010–2011)

Robert Douglas Weinhardt (born December 8, 1985) is a former professional baseball relief pitcher. He played in Major League Baseball (MLB) for the Detroit Tigers. He went to college at Oklahoma State.

== Career ==
=== Detroit Tigers ===
Weinhardt was drafted by the Detroit Tigers in the 10th round, with the 313th overall selection, of the 2008 Major League Baseball draft. He was called up to the majors for the first time on July 7, 2010. Weinhardt pitched an inning, giving up one run in his first career outing against the Baltimore Orioles. On July 9, he entered the game for Justin Verlander with the bases loaded, and induced a double play to get out of the inning. The next inning he got his first career strikeouts, finishing the day with 1 2/3 innings pitched and two strikeouts. On July 30, he earned his first career win against the Boston Red Sox. Weinhardt made 28 appearances for Detroit during his rookie campaign, compiling a 2-2 record and 6.14 ERA with 21 strikeouts across 29 1/3 innings pitched.

Weinhardt made two appearances for Detroit in 2011, but struggled to a 10.80 ERA with one strikeout over 1 2/3 innings. On May 24, 2011, Weinhardt was designated for assignment following the promotion of Adam Wilk. He cleared waivers and was sent outright to the Triple-A Toledo Mud Hens on May 26.

Weinhardt spent the 2012 season with the Double-A Erie SeaWolves, registering a 1-2 record and 2.73 ERA with 56 strikeouts and seven saves across 66 innings of work. He split the 2013 campaign between Erie and Toledo, accumulating an aggregate 3-0 record and 3.13 ERA with 46 strikeouts over 69 innings of work. Weinhardt was released by the Tigers organization on October 28, 2013.

=== Sugar Land Skeeters ===
Weinhardt signed with the Sugar Land Skeeters of the Atlantic League of Professional Baseball prior to the 2015 season. He made 47 appearances for the team that year, posting a 2-3 record and 2.82 ERA with 55 strikeouts and two saves across 44 2/3 innings pitched.

On February 22, 2016, Weinhardt re-signed with Sugar Land. In 56 appearances (one start) for the Skeeters, he logged a 6-7 record and 3.97 ERA with 61 strikeouts and two saves over 59 innings of work. Weinhardt became a free agent after the season.
