= Daniel Schlereth =

American baseball player (born 1986)

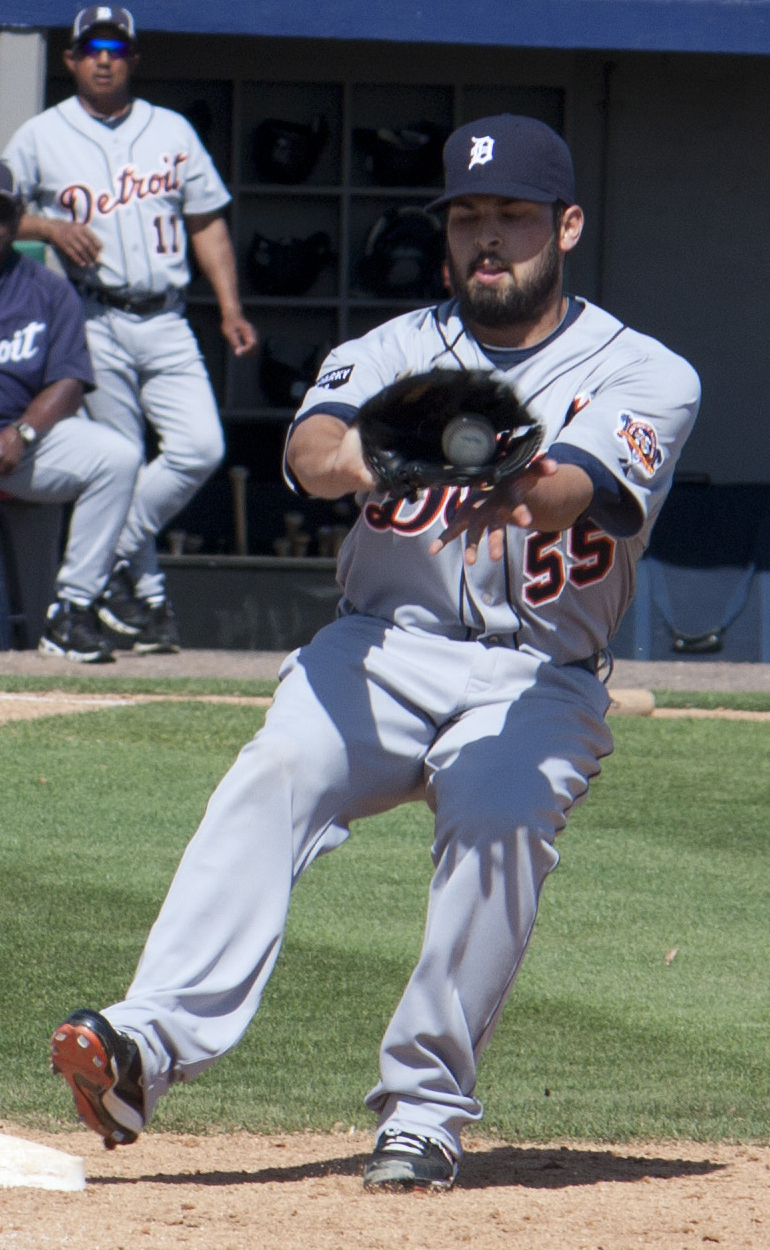
- Schlereth pitching for the Detroit Tigers in 2011

Michigan State Spartans
- Pitcher / Coach
- Born: May 9, 1986 (age 40); Anchorage, Alaska, U.S.
- Batted: Left Threw: Left

MLB debut
- May 29, 2009, for the Arizona Diamondbacks

Last MLB appearance
- April 21, 2012, for the Detroit Tigers

MLB statistics
- Win–loss record: 5–6
- Earned run average: 4.35
- Strikeouts: 91
- Stats at Baseball Reference

Teams
- Arizona Diamondbacks (2009); Detroit Tigers (2010–2012)

Daniel Robert Schlereth (born May 9, 1986) is an American former professional baseball pitcher. He played in Major League Baseball (MLB) for the Arizona Diamondbacks and Detroit Tigers. He currently serves as the Director of Baseball Operations and Pitching Development for the Michigan State Spartans.

== Early years ==
Schlereth was born in Anchorage, Alaska, before moving to Highlands Ranch, Colorado. He is a graduate of Highlands Ranch High School. During his high school career, he struck out a school record 19 batters in a single game while throwing a total of 6 no-hitters. He also played quarterback for the football team and broke the school rushing record in a single season and had the longest run from scrimmage in school history, 96 yards. He was named Colorado Gatorade Offensive Player of the Year his senior season.

== College career ==
Schlereth attended the University of Arizona, where he pitched for three seasons. During his time at Arizona, he was named a Collegiate Baseball All-American in 2008 and a two time All Pac-10 performer. He also pitched alongside Detroit Tigers teammate Ryan Perry.

== Professional career ==
=== Arizona Diamondbacks ===
Schlereth was drafted by the Oakland Athletics in the 8th round of the 2007 Major League Baseball draft, but did not sign. He then was drafted by the Arizona Diamondbacks in the 1st round (26th overall) of the 2008 Major League Baseball draft. He made his major league debut in a relief appearance against the Atlanta Braves on May 29, 2009, throwing a perfect inning.

=== Detroit Tigers ===
On December 9, 2009, Schlereth and Max Scherzer were traded to the Detroit Tigers as part of a three-team trade that brought Ian Kennedy and Edwin Jackson to the Diamondbacks. Schlereth spent the first half of the 2010 season with the Toledo Mud Hens, posting a 2.83 ERA and 45 strikeouts. He was called up by the Tigers on July 2, 2010, to replace Fu-Te Ni on the roster, who was sent down two days earlier. On August 15, 2011, Schlereth gave up Jim Thome's 600th home run against the Twins at Comerica Park. On November 30, 2012, the Tigers non-tendered Schlereth's contract, making him a free agent.

=== Baltimore Orioles ===
On December 19, 2012, Schlereth was signed to minor league contract with the Baltimore Orioles that included an invitation to spring training. He made 12 appearances for the Triple-A Norfolk Tides, recording an 0.82 ERA with 7 strikeouts across 11 innings of work.

=== Pittsburgh Pirates ===
Schlereth signed a minor league contract with the Pittsburgh Pirates on December 18, 2013. In 21 appearances for the Triple-A Indianapolis Indians in 2014, he struggled to a 1-2 record and 7.23 ERA with 18 strikeouts across 18 2/3 innings pitched.

=== Detroit Tigers (second stint) ===
On June 24, 2014, the Detroit Tigers acquired Schlereth from Pittsburgh in exchange for cash considerations, and was assigned to their Triple-A affiliate, the Toledo Mud Hens. He posted a 4.50 ERA in 17 games with the Mud Hens. On January 14, 2015, the Tigers signed Schlereth to a minor league contract.

=== Toronto Blue Jays ===
On January 18, 2016, Schlereth signed a minor league contract with the Toronto Blue Jays. In 15 games for the Double-A New Hampshire Fisher Cats, he registered an 0-2 record and 4.32 ERA with 11 strikeouts across 16 2/3 innings pitched. Schlereth was released by the Blue Jays organization on June 30.

=== Miami Marlins ===
On December 12, 2016, Schlereth signed a minor league contract with the St. Louis Cardinals that included an invitation to spring training. He was released on March 27, 2017.

On April 9, 2017, Schlereth signed a minor league contract with the Miami Marlins. He split the season between the High–A Jupiter Hammerheads, Double–A Jacksonville Jumbo Shrimp, and Triple–A New Orleans Baby Cakes. In 37 relief outings between the three affiliates, Schlereth accumulated a 2.38 ERA with 39 strikeouts and 5 saves across 41 2/3 innings pitched. He elected free agency following the season on November 6.

=== Long Island Ducks ===
On May 6, 2018, Schlereth signed with the Long Island Ducks of the Atlantic League of Professional Baseball.

=== Seattle Mariners ===
On June 2, 2018, Schlereth's contract was purchased by the Seattle Mariners organization. He made 20 appearances split between the Double–A Arkansas Travelers and Triple–A Tacoma Rainiers, accumulating a 3.60 ERA with 19 strikeouts across 15 innings of work. Schlereth elected free agency following the season on November 2.

=== Sugar Land Skeeters ===
On January 14, 2019, Schlereth signed a minor league contract with the Boston Red Sox. He was released by the Red Sox on March 21.

On May 31, 2019, Schlereth signed with the Sugar Land Skeeters of the Atlantic League of Professional Baseball. He became a free agent following the season.

== Coaching career ==
=== Joliet Slammers ===
On February 21, 2022, Schlereth was named manager for the Joliet Slammers of the Frontier League.

=== Western Michigan University ===
On August 22, 2022, it was announced that Schlereth would be joining Western Michigan University as the team's pitching coach for the 2023 season.

=== South Florida Bulls ===
On June 15, 2024, Schlereth was named pitching coach for the South Florida Bulls.

== Personal life ==
Schlereth's father, Mark, was a professional football player who spent 12 seasons in the NFL with the Washington Redskins and Denver Broncos, and was a starting offensive guard on three Super Bowl championship teams. The elder Schlereth was born and raised in Anchorage and played college football at Idaho; he is currently an NFL analyst for Fox Sports, and co-host of the morning edition of Denver's sports radio show, 104.3 The Fan.

Daniel Schlereth was married on November 13, 2010 to Bree Workman, a collegiate gymnast at Arizona. They have two daughters and one son.

== Repertoire ==
Schlereth predominantly is a two-pitch pitcher. He features a curveball in the low 80s and a fastball in the mid 90s.
