= Will Rhymes =

American baseball player (born 1983)

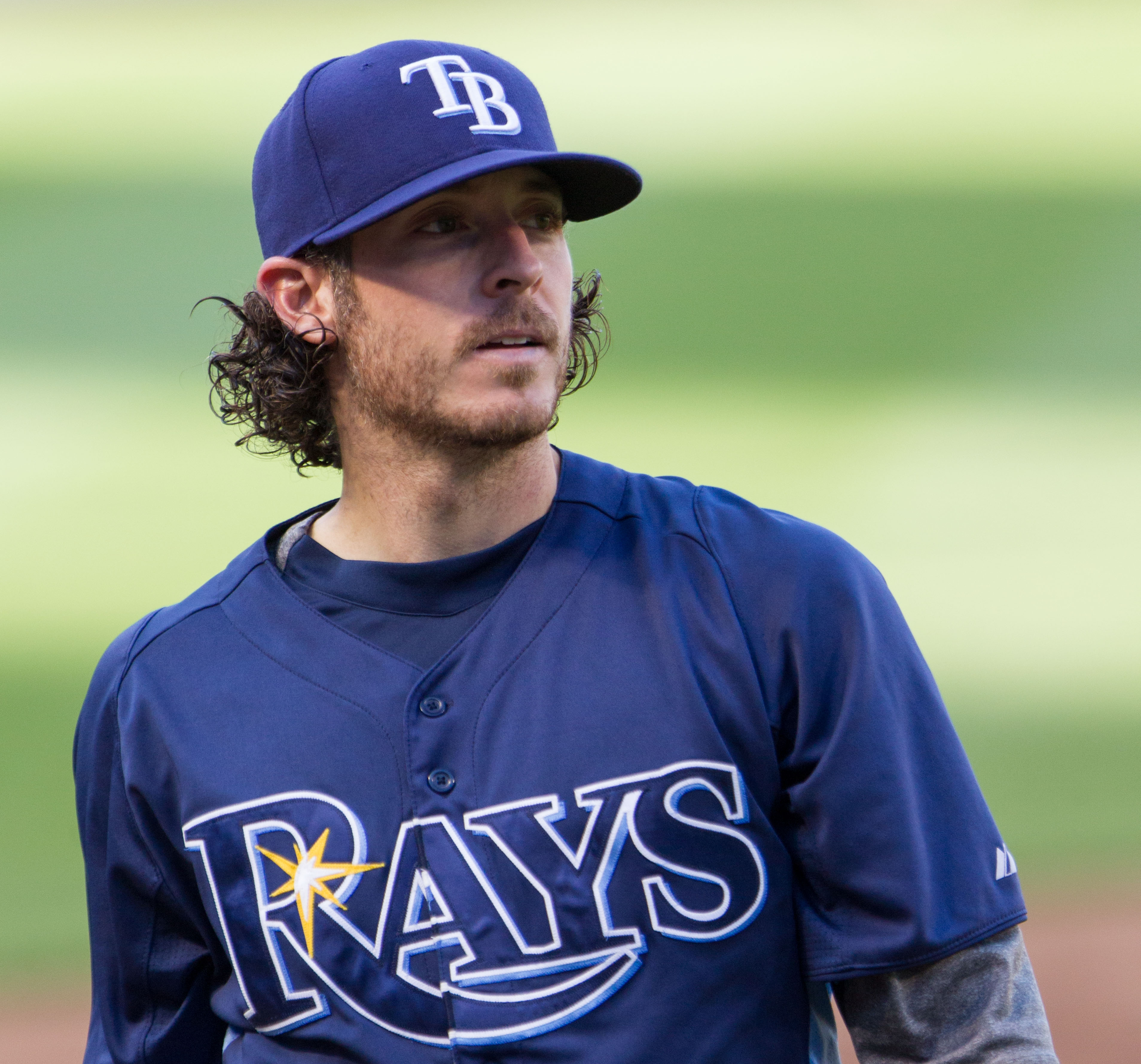
- Rhymes with the Tampa Bay Rays in 2012
- Second baseman
- Born: April 1, 1983 (age 43); Houston, Texas, U.S.
- Batted: Left Threw: Right

MLB debut
- July 25, 2010, for the Detroit Tigers

Last MLB appearance
- August 5, 2012, for the Tampa Bay Rays

MLB statistics
- Batting average: .266
- Home runs: 2
- Runs batted in: 29
- Stats at Baseball Reference

Teams
- Detroit Tigers (2010–2011); Tampa Bay Rays (2012)

William Daniel Rhymes (born April 1, 1983) is an American former professional baseball second baseman and current front office executive for the Los Angeles Dodgers of Major League Baseball (MLB). His title is Director of Player Development. He played in MLB for the Detroit Tigers and Tampa Bay Rays from 2010 to 2012.

== Early life ==
Rhymes was raised in Houston and has an identical twin brother named Jonathan.As a young child Rhymes first played baseball at West U. Little league in Houston, Texas where he first showcased his skills. Rhymes attended Lamar High School in Houston, where he played baseball.

== College career ==
Rhymes attended the College of William & Mary, where he played college baseball for the William & Mary Tribe. He majored in biology, rushed the fraternity of Lambda Chi Alpha, and graduated in 2005.

Rhymes first earned attention from major league scouts while playing collegiate summer baseball with the Brewster Whitecaps of the Cape Cod Baseball League in 2004. Though initially recruited as a temporary player, Rhymes's extraordinary effort and superb performance on the field earned him a contract through the entire summer and a starting spot at second base. Rhymes earned a reserve spot in the mid-season East Division All Stars as well as the post-season league-wide All Star Team.

== Professional career ==
=== Detroit Tigers ===
Rhymes was drafted by the Detroit Tigers in the 27th round of the 2005 Major League Baseball draft. He was promoted to the big league club on July 25, 2010, after injuries struck the Tigers lineup and made his major league debut the same day in a pinch-hitting role against the Toronto Blue Jays.

Rhymes was optioned back to the Triple-A Toledo Mud Hens following the return of the Tigers injured second baseman but was recalled August 18, 2010. On September 20, Rhymes hit his first major league career home run off of Zack Greinke of the Kansas City Royals. Rhymes’s home run was initially ruled an RBI triple, but after further review of the replay, the ruling on the field was overturned and ruled a two-run home run after it bounced off the horizontal iron support above the wall in right. This was the first time an instant-replay review granted a player the first home run of their career. He made 54 appearances for Detroit during his rookie campaign, batting .304/.350/.414 with one home run and 19 RBI.

It was announced at the start of the 2011 season that Rhymes would make the Opening Day roster for the first time in his career, and would be the starting second baseman for the Tigers. He made 29 appearances for Detroit, slashing .235/.323/.271 with two RBI and one stolen base. On December 12, 2011, the Tigers non-tendered Rhymes, making him a free agent.

=== Tampa Bay Rays ===
On January 19, 2012, Rhymes signed a minor league contract with the Tampa Bay Rays organization. On May 1, the Rays selected Rhymes' contract, adding him to their active roster. On May 16, Rhymes was hit by a pitch by Boston Red Sox pitcher Franklin Morales. This incident caused Rhymes to faint from an adrenaline rush after being struck by the 95 mph fastball. Rhymes played his last MLB game for the Rays on August 5. In 47 total games for Tampa Bay, he slashed .228/.299/.285 with one home run, eight RBI, and one stolen base. Rhymes was designated for assignment by the Rays on September 1, following Jeff Niemann's activation from the injured list. He cleared waivers and was sent outright to the Triple-A Durham Bulls on September 3. Rhymes elected free agency on November 2.

=== Washington Nationals ===
On November 15, 2012, Rhymes signed a minor league contract with the Washington Nationals organization. He made 133 appearances for the Triple-A Syracuse Chiefs in 2013, hitting .274/.360/.349 with three home runs, 51 RBI, and seven stolen bases.

On December 30, 2013, Rhymes re-signed with the Nationals organization on a new minor league contract. He played in 114 games for Syracuse during the 2014 campaign, batting .255/.313/.375 with five home runs, 42 RBI, and five stolen bases. Rhymes became a free agent after the season and later retired.

== Front office career ==
On March 17, 2019, Rhymes was promoted to director of player development in the Los Angeles Dodgers baseball operations department. Rhymes had previously served as assistant farm director.
