= Jay Sborz =

American baseball pitcher (born 1985)

- Pitcher
- Born: January 24, 1985 (age 40); Washington, D.C., U.S.
- Batted: Right Threw: Right

MLB debut
- June 22, 2010, for the Detroit Tigers

Last MLB appearance
- June 22, 2010, for the Detroit Tigers

MLB statistics
- Win–loss record: 0–0
- Earned run average: 67.50
- Strikeouts: 1
- Stats at Baseball Reference

Teams
- Detroit Tigers (2010)

John James Sborz (born January 24, 1985) is an American former professional baseball pitcher who played in Major League Baseball (MLB) for the Detroit Tigers in 2010.

== Professional career ==
Sborz attended Langley High School in McLean, Virginia, and pitched for the school's baseball team. He threw a no-hitter in his senior year. The Detroit Tigers selected Sborz in the second round (40th overall) of the 2003 Major League Baseball draft. He made his professional debut with the rookie-level Gulf Coast League Tigers. Sborz returned to the affiliate in 2004, logging a 1-4 record and 4.48 ERA with 62 strikeouts in 12 starts.

Sborz split the 2005 season between the Low-A Oneonta Tigers and Single-A West Michigan Whitecaps. In 30 appearances (seven starts) for the two affiliates, he struggled to a 2-4 record and 6.07 ERA with 56 strikeouts across 56 1/3 innings pitched. He missed most of the 2006 season due to shoulder tendonitis, and had surgery that caused him to miss much of the 2007 season.

In 2008, Sborz made 40 appearances for the High-A Lakeland Flying Tigers, in which he logged a 3-2 record and 2.87 ERA with 48 strikeouts and seven saves across 53 1/3 innings pitched. He split the 2009 season between Lakeland, the Double-A Erie SeaWolves, and Triple-A Toledo Mud Hens, accumulating a 2-2 record and 2.27 ERA with 35 strikeouts across 31 2/3 innings of work.

The Tigers promoted Sborz to the major leagues on June 21, 2010, to take the roster spot of Rick Porcello, who was sent down to the minors the day before. He made his major league debut the next day, at Citi Field against the New York Mets, and hit the first two batters he faced. He was optioned to the Triple-A Toledo Mud Hens two days later, and never pitched in another MLB game. On November 4, Sborz was removed from the 40-man roster and sent outright to Toledo; he subsequently elected free agency.

On November 19, 2010, Sborz signed a minor league contract with the Atlanta Braves organization. He was assigned to the Triple-A Gwinnett Braves, but did not make an appearance prior to his release on May 5, 2011.

== Personal ==
Sborz's brother, Josh, pitches in MLB for the Texas Rangers, with whom he won the 2023 World Series.
