= Phil Coke =

American baseball pitcher (born 1982)

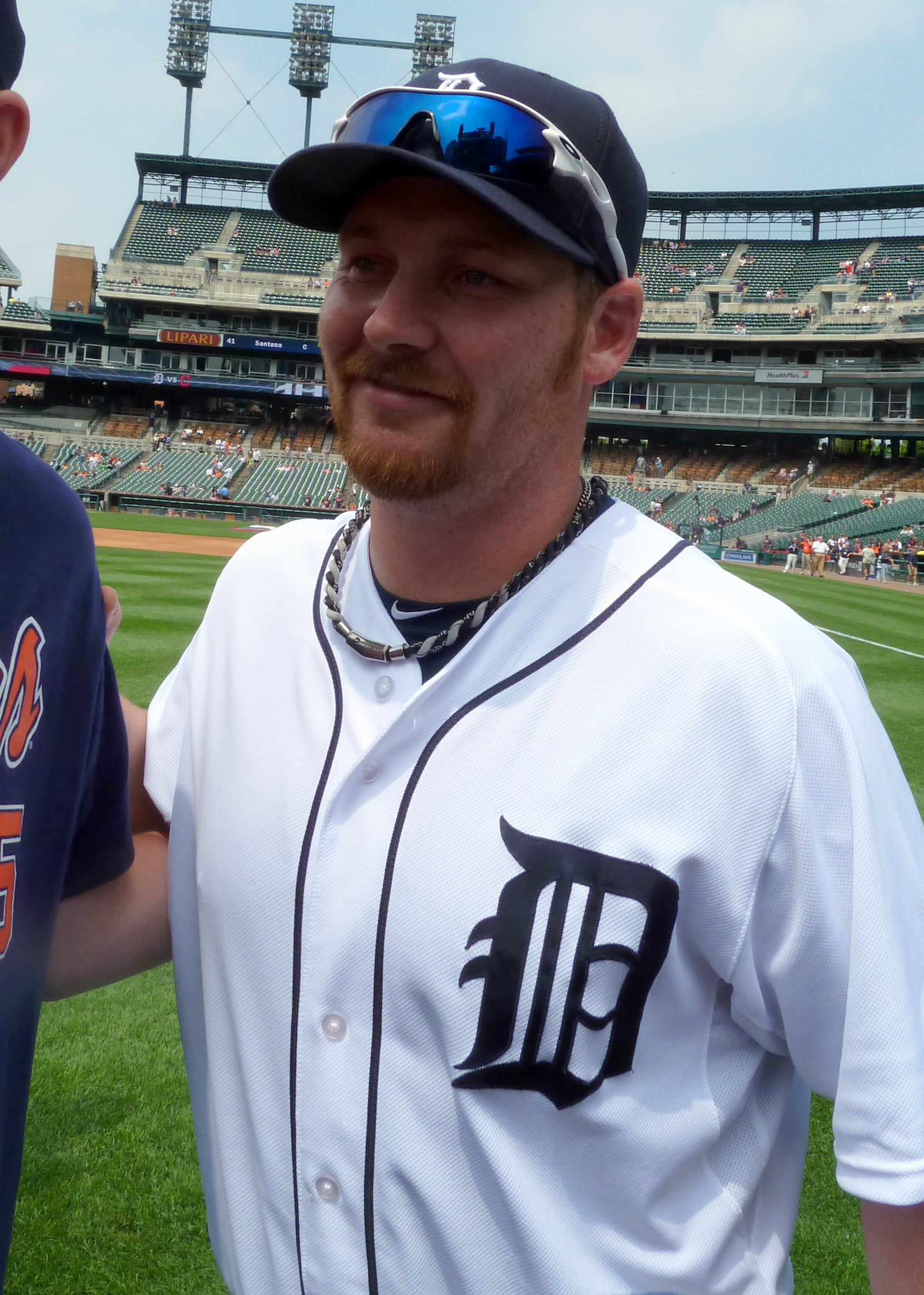
- Coke with the Detroit Tigers in 2013
- Pitcher
- Born: July 19, 1982 (age 44); Sonora, California, U.S.
- Batted: Left Threw: Left

Professional debut
- MLB: September 1, 2008, for the New York Yankees
- NPB: April 1, 2017, for the Orix Buffaloes

Last appearance
- MLB: September 26, 2016, for the Pittsburgh Pirates
- NPB: May 13, 2017, for the Orix Buffaloes

MLB statistics
- Win–loss record: 22–27
- Earned run average: 4.19
- Strikeouts: 323

NPB statistics
- Win–loss record: 2–3
- Earned run average: 4.56
- Strikeouts: 16
- Stats at Baseball Reference

Teams
- New York Yankees (2008–2009); Detroit Tigers (2010–2014); Chicago Cubs (2015); Toronto Blue Jays (2015); New York Yankees (2016); Pittsburgh Pirates (2016); Orix Buffaloes (2017)

Career highlights and awards
- World Series champion (2009)

Phillip Douglas Coke (born July 19, 1982) is an American former professional baseball pitcher. Pitching primarily in relief, he played in Major League Baseball (MLB) for the New York Yankees, Detroit Tigers, Chicago Cubs, Toronto Blue Jays, and Pittsburgh Pirates. Coke's MLB career spanned from 2008 to 2016. He won a World Series championship as a member of the Yankees in 2009.

== Amateur career ==
Coke pitched and played outfield and first base at Sonora High School in California. He was drafted by the Florida Marlins in the 49th round (1,450th overall) of the 2001 Major League Baseball Draft. He did not sign, choosing to attend San Joaquin Delta College in Stockton instead.

== Professional career ==
=== New York Yankees ===
Coke was drafted by the New York Yankees in the 26th round (786th overall) of the 2002 Major League Baseball draft. He signed with the Yankees for $80,000.

He began his baseball career with the GCL Yankees in 2003. In 2004, he was promoted to the Short Season A Staten Island Yankees, but suffered an elbow injury after just three games. Coke moved to Low-A with the Charleston RiverDogs in 2005, pitching to a 5.42 ERA in 24 games (18 starts). He was promoted to High-A with the Tampa Yankees, compiling a 3.60 ERA in 22 games (18 starts). He returned to Tampa in 2007 and missed time with another elbow injury, compiling a 3.09 ERA in 99 innings as a starter.

In 2008, Coke made his Double-A debut with the Trenton Thunder, going 9–4 with a 2.54 ERA in 23 games (20 starts) and was an Eastern League All-Star. He soon became a coveted prospect and was very nearly traded to the Pittsburgh Pirates in a package for Damaso Marte and Xavier Nady. On August 1, he was promoted to Triple-A and moved to the bullpen. He went 2–2 with a 4.67 ERA in 13 games with the Scranton/Wilkes-Barre Yankees.

Coke made his major league debut on September 1, 2008, for the Yankees, against the Detroit Tigers, with a scoreless inning and strikeouts of Curtis Granderson and Miguel Cabrera. He allowed one run on eight hits and two walks while striking out 14 batters in 14.2 innings for the Yankees that year. For his performance in the minors that year, the Yankees named Coke the organization's Pitcher of the Year in 2008.

Coke remained with the Yankees for the entire 2009 season, pitching to a 4.50 ERA with 49 strikeouts in 60 innings. He led the Yankees in appearances by pitching in 72 games that year. Coke was included on the team's playoff roster and won a World Series ring after the Yankees defeated the Philadelphia Phillies in six games.

=== Detroit Tigers ===
On December 9, 2009, Coke and Austin Jackson were traded to the Detroit Tigers, and Ian Kennedy was sent to the Arizona Diamondbacks, as part of a three-team trade that sent Curtis Granderson to the Yankees.

Coke's first season in Detroit proved to be successful, as he finished 2010 with a 3.76 ERA (his career best to date) with 17 holds and two saves in 21 hold/save situations. The Tigers decided that he would be a starter for the 2011 season. He pitched to a 1–8 record with a 4.82 ERA through 14 starts. On June 30, Detroit announced that Coke would be moved back to the bullpen. He would finish 2011 with a 3–9 record and a 4.47 ERA. After the season, Tigers general manager Dave Dombrowski confirmed that Coke would not return to the rotation the next year.

On January 16, 2012, Coke signed a one-year, $1.1 million deal with the Tigers to avoid arbitration. He was eligible to earn an additional $50,000 based on appearances in the 2012 season. That year, Coke pitched to 4.00 ERA with a 1.65 WHIP in 66 games, yet was the Tigers' most reliable reliever in the 2012 playoffs. Pressed into duty as the team's closer after José Valverde surrendered seven runs in his previous two appearances, Coke pitched two shutout innings in Game 2 of the 2012 ALCS against the Yankees to earn a save. He then saved Game 3 by striking out Raúl Ibañez on a 3–2 slider to preserve a 2–1 victory after allowing back-to-back two-out singles. In Game 4, Coke pitched two perfect innings to finish off the Tigers' 8–1 win over his former team and send Detroit to the World Series for the first time in six years.

In the 2012 World Series against the San Francisco Giants, Coke struck out a record-setting seven consecutive batters in 3 1/3 innings. After striking out the side in the 9th inning of Game 4, he allowed the series-winning run in the 10th and took the loss. Coke finished the 2012 Postseason allowing one run in 10 2/3 innings (0.84 ERA) and striking out 13 batters, setting a Tigers record.

Coke struggled throughout the 2013 season, failing as a setup man and lefty specialist. He suffered a groin injury in late April and was placed on the disabled list on May 1. Tossing only 38 1/3 innings on the year, Coke's ERA ballooned to a career-high 5.40. On August 20, the Tigers demoted him to Triple-A and promoted left-handed pitcher José Álvarez to the major league roster. He returned as a September call-up, but suffered an elbow injury on September 18. Following a setback, he was unable to return for the regular season. Coke was added to the Tigers roster for the American League Championship Series against the Boston Red Sox. He was used exclusively against left-handed batters, allowing one run in an inning of work spread across four games.

In 2014, his final season with the Tigers, Coke posted a 5–2 record with 41 strikeouts and a 3.88 ERA in 58 innings pitched. He became a free agent following the season.

=== Chicago Cubs ===
On March 7, 2015, Coke signed a minor league contract with the Chicago Cubs, receiving a non-roster invitation to spring training. Coke earned a $2.25 million salary upon making the team. He had his contract selected to the major league roster on March 30. Coke had a 6.30 ERA in 16 appearances, allowing left-handed batters to hit .304 (7-for-23) against him. He was designated for assignment by the Cubs on May 18, and released by the club on May 26.

=== Toronto Blue Jays ===
On May 30, 2015, Coke signed a minor league contract with the Toronto Blue Jays, and was assigned to the Triple-A Buffalo Bisons. On June 11, the Blue Jays purchased Coke's contract from Triple-A. He took the mound for the first time with Toronto on June 14, pitching two scoreless innings in a 13–5 win over the Boston Red Sox. He became a free agent again on June 22, after he declined his minor-league assignment by the Blue Jays.

=== Oakland Athletics ===
On June 27, 2015, Coke signed a minor league deal with the Oakland Athletics. He was initially assigned to High-A Stockton. He later joined the Triple-A Nashville Sounds but was released on August 18.

=== Atlanta Braves ===
On March 11, 2016, Coke signed a minor league contract with the Atlanta Braves. On March 26, 2016, he was released.

=== Lancaster Barnstormers ===
On April 10, 2016, Coke signed with the Lancaster Barnstormers of the Atlantic League of Professional Baseball. He made 1 start throwing 4 innings giving up 6 hits 2 ER (4.50 ERA) 1 walk and 3 strikeouts.

=== New York Yankees (second stint) ===
On April 25, 2016, the Yankees acquired Coke from the Atlantic League, and assigned him to Scranton/Wilkes-Barre. The Yankees promoted Coke to the major leagues on May 6. After allowing five runs on seven hits and four walks in six innings, he was designated for assignment on May 17. On May 20, he was outrighted from the 40-man roster and optioned to Triple-A Scranton/Wilkes Barre.

=== Pittsburgh Pirates ===
On September 22, 2016, the Pittsburgh Pirates acquired Coke from the Yankees for cash considerations. He was designated for assignment on October 5. He cleared waivers and elected free agency on October 11.

=== Orix Buffaloes ===
On December 13, 2016, Coke signed with the Orix Buffaloes of Nippon Professional Baseball.

On December 2, 2017, he became a free agent.

=== Acereros de Monclova ===
In an attempt to return to the big leagues, Coke started throwing a knuckleball. When no teams were willing to sign him, Coke joined the Acereros de Monclova of the Mexican League. He was released on May 4, 2018. In 6 starts, he went 1-2 with a 6.49 ERA and 20 strikeouts.

In August 2018, Coke underwent Tommy John surgery.

== Career summary ==
Coke pitched in 407 regular season MLB games from 2008 to 2016. In his career, he posted a 22-27 record with a 4.19 earned run average and eight saves.

== Pitch selection ==
Coke threw mostly four-seam and two-seam fastballs. His four-seamer was thrown in the 93 to 95 miles per hour (150 to 153 km/h) range, occasionally reaching 97 miles per hour (156 km/h). The two-seamer was a shade slower, averaging 92 to 93 miles per hour (148 to 150 km/h). He mixed in a slider in the 78 to 83 miles per hour (126 to 134 km/h) range and an occasional changeup between 83 miles per hour (134 km/h) and 86 miles per hour (138 km/h).

== Personal life ==
Coke married Bobbie Brough in 2011. When he was still pitching in the minors, Coke worked as a chimney sweep in the offseason.
