= Joel Zumaya =

American baseball player (born 1984)

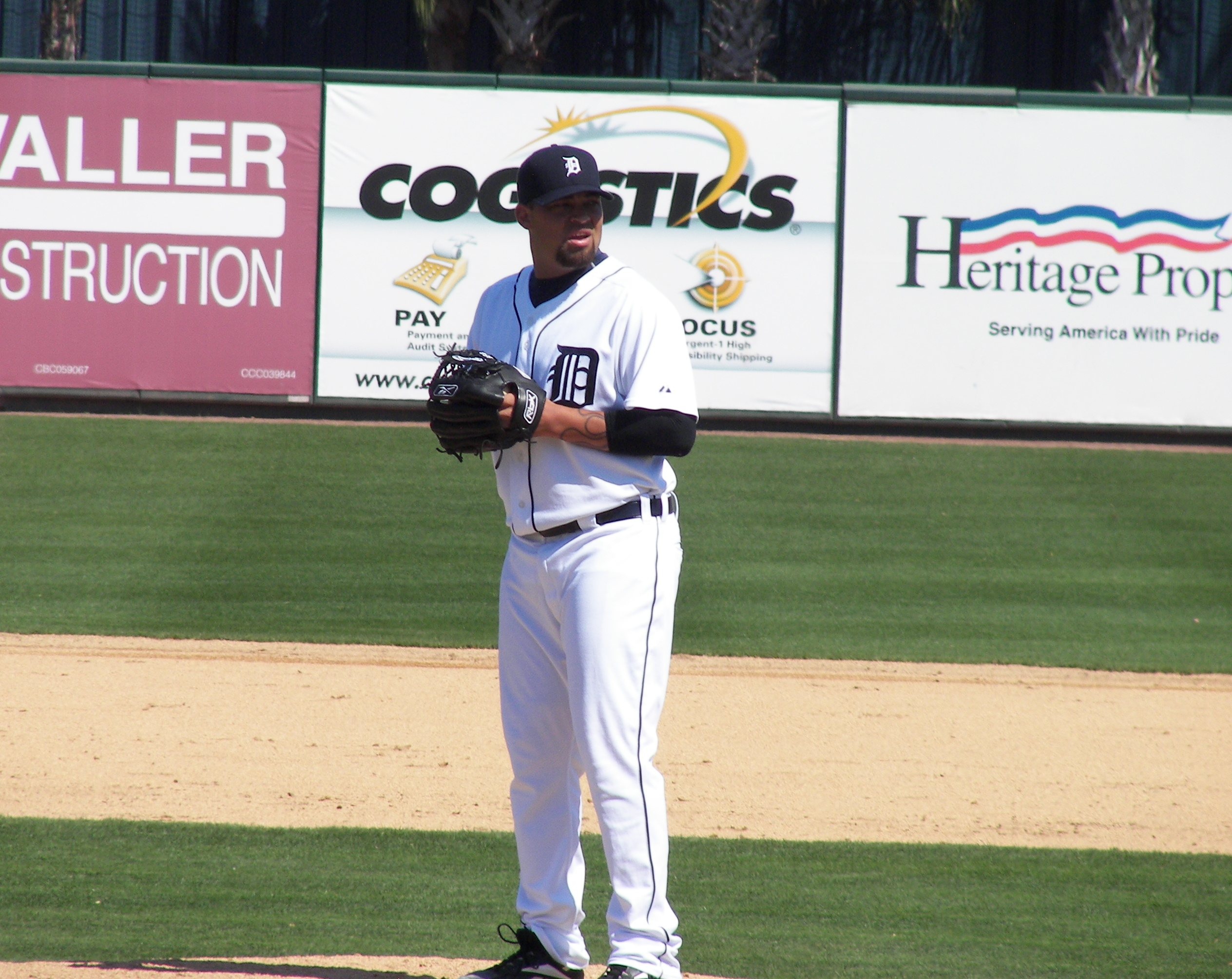
- Zumaya with the Detroit Tigers in 2009
- Pitcher
- Born: November 9, 1984 (age 42); Chula Vista, California, U.S.
- Batted: Right Threw: Right

MLB debut
- April 3, 2006, for the Detroit Tigers

Last MLB appearance
- June 28, 2010, for the Detroit Tigers

MLB statistics
- Win–loss record: 13–12
- Earned run average: 3.05
- Strikeouts: 210
- Stats at Baseball Reference

Teams
- Detroit Tigers (2006–2010)

Joel Martin Zumaya (born November 9, 1984) is an American former professional baseball pitcher. He pitched in Major League Baseball (MLB) for the Detroit Tigers from 2006 through 2010.

== Baseball career ==
Zumaya was drafted out of Bonita Vista High School in the 11th round by the Detroit Tigers, the 320th overall selection of the 2002 Major League Baseball draft. He was chosen because of his power arm, but it was not clear whether he would be able to develop adequate control of an off-speed pitch. He is known for his 100 miles per hour (160 km/h) fastball, which catcher Iván Rodríguez credits as having been the fastest pitch he ever caught.

=== Minor league career ===
Zumaya began his stint in the Tigers minor league system as a starting pitcher. Because he was drafted straight out of high school, Zumaya frequently pitched against players older than himself. In 2003, the 18-year-old Zumaya made great strides pitching for the Low-A affiliate West Michigan Whitecaps. 2004 saw Zumaya begin the year pitching for the High-A affiliate Lakeland Tigers, before a late season promotion to the Double-A Erie SeaWolves. He finished the season with a .500 win–loss record and struggled with walks. Zumaya began the 2005 season back in Erie; however, his results were much improved from 2004, and he was soon promoted to the Triple-A Toledo Mud Hens. He finished the season with 199 strikeouts in 151 innings pitched. In 77 games over four seasons, Zumaya was 27–19, and averaged 6.4 hits and 11.1 strikeouts per nine innings.

=== Major league career ===
==== Detroit Tigers (2006–2011) ====
With the Tigers, he was most often used as a middle relief pitcher and occasionally as a setup man. Zumaya was a fan favorite for his intense, aggressive attitude on the mound and his 100 miles per hour (160 km/h) fastball, which topped out at 104.8 miles per hour (168.7 km/h). This was the fastest pitch ever recorded at that time. He also had a very good knuckle-curve that he used as an off-speed pitch. He was among the primary reasons for the Tigers bullpen success in 2006, joining fellow rookie Justin Verlander on the resurgent 2006 Tigers team. However, Zumaya was hampered by injuries to his throwing arm following his rookie season in 2006, and was never the same pitcher again.

While he held batters to a .187 batting average in 2006, he was even tougher with runners in scoring position (.176), and two outs and runners in scoring position (.143). Zumaya remained in the bullpen for the 2006 playoffs. However, Zumaya was sidelined for the 2006 American League Championship Series by a sore wrist, which Tigers general manager Dave Dombrowski disclosed in a December 2006 radio interview was due to Zumaya playing the PlayStation 2 video game Guitar Hero. This was acknowledged by the game's developers with a message on the credits of the Xbox 360 version of Guitar Hero II: No pitchers were harmed in the making of this game. Except for one. Joel Zumaya. He had it coming. In a 2016 interview with the Detroit News, however, Zumaya said the Guitar Hero story was just a cover, and not true. While refusing to disclose the actual source of the injury, and calling the Guitar Hero story his "final answer", he also admitted that it was "some bogus stuff."

Zumaya's future was then clouded by injury: in May 2007, he ruptured a tendon in his hand, requiring surgery and 12 weeks rehab. On August 2, 2007, the Tigers activated Zumaya from the 15-day disabled list after not playing since May 1. The next day, he made his first major league appearance following the injury, pitching to one batter in a game against the Cleveland Indians.

Zumaya sustained another injury, this time to his shoulder, during the 2007 offseason. While helping his father move some boxes in the attic at his father's home in advance of a fire approaching the area, a 50 to 60 pounds (23 to 27 kg) box fell on his right (pitching) shoulder, separating it.

He was placed on the 60-day disabled list at the start of the 2008 season. After appearing in six successful minor league rehab games for the Single-A Lakeland Flying Tigers and Triple-A Toledo Mud Hens, Zumaya rejoined the Tigers on June 20, 2008.

Zumaya was placed on the 15-day DL with a sore right shoulder on March 27, 2009. He was reactivated by the end of April; however, he was placed back on the 15-day DL following a July 18 appearance against the New York Yankees, where it was reported he could barely move his right (throwing) arm. Zumaya had surgery in August, ending his season.

On June 28, 2010, Zumaya injured his elbow in the eighth inning, while pitching against the Minnesota Twins' Delmon Young at Target Field. He was in obvious pain and needed assistance walking off the field. The next day an MRI revealed he had a non-displaced fracture of the olecranon. Doctors said it would take four months to heal, ending his season.

Zumaya missed the entire 2011 season after undergoing exploratory surgery on his right elbow on May 10. While the surgery, performed by James Andrews found no new damage, it was determined that the screw inserted during his previous surgery needed to be replaced. He was unable to recover sufficiently to return to the team that season, his last before being able to enter free agency for the 2012 season.

==== Minnesota Twins (2012) ====
On January 15, 2012, Zumaya agreed to a one-year contract with the Minnesota Twins worth $800,000 to $1.7 million. On February 25, Zumaya tore an ulnar collateral ligament in his throwing elbow 13 pitches into a live batting practice session, requiring Tommy John surgery and ending his 2012 season, in which he was guaranteed to earn $400,000. He was released on March 3.

Zumaya retired from professional baseball on February 8, 2014.

== Record-setting fastballs ==
During the 2006 season, Zumaya often threw pitches that were measured at or above the official record reading of 101 miles per hour (163 km/h). On July 3, 2006, at McAfee Coliseum in Oakland, California, Justin Verlander, Zumaya, and Fernando Rodney each threw multiple fastballs measured in at over 100 miles per hour (160 km/h), becoming the first time in MLB history that three pitchers on the same team had done so during a game. Just five games into the season, they became the first MLB team to have the same three pitchers throw over 100 miles per hour (160 km/h) in a season. On July 4, 2006, at McAfee Coliseum in Oakland, California, Zumaya threw a pitch measured at 103 miles per hour (166 km/h), thus tying the "unofficial" record held by Mark Wohlers. Similarly, on May 20, 2006, Zumaya gave up a grand slam to Ken Griffey Jr. on a pitch that FSN Detroit's radar gun measured at 104 miles per hour (167 km/h).

Zumaya hit 104 miles per hour (167 km/h) on the Comerica Park radar gun on August 7 while pitching against Minnesota Twins infielder Nick Punto. Zumaya reached 101 miles per hour (163 km/h) or higher on five of six pitches during the at-bat. He also reached 103 miles per hour (166 km/h) during the Tigers' 4–3 playoff victory at Yankee Stadium on October 5, 2006; and also on October 10, 2006, during Game 1 of the ALCS in Oakland, against the A's.

In an interview for Detroit radio station WRIF, former Tigers pitcher Denny McLain stated that he believed the numbers on stadium and television radar guns were inflated.

PITCHf/x, a new technology that used cameras and software to obtain pitch speed more accurately, did not inflate those numbers. One pitch registered on this was measured at 104.8 miles per hour (168.7 km/h) at release by Joel Zumaya. This was during Game 1 of the ALCS against Frank Thomas of the Oakland Athletics on October 10, 2006, at Oakland's McAfee Coliseum (other readings were at 103 miles per hour (166 km/h); the slowest reading was 102 miles per hour (164 km/h)).

After the 2006 season, The Bill James Handbook published a list of pitchers and the number of their pitches thrown at 100 miles per hour (160 km/h) or more. Zumaya led the major leagues with 233. Zumaya's average fastball was 98.6 miles per hour (158.7 km/h), with 100+ mph fastballs coming one out of six pitches.

In 2009 and 2010, Zumaya's fastball averaged 99 miles per hour (159 km/h), according to Pitch f/x.

== Post-playing career ==
After his baseball career, Zumaya had other careers distinct from baseball. In 2016, he worked as a fisherman. In 2019, Zumaya worked at San Diego International Airport. He resides in Chula Vista, California.

== See also ==
- Best pitching seasons by a Detroit Tiger
