= 2010 Baltimore Orioles season =

Major League Baseball season

2010 Baltimore Orioles
- League: American League
- Division: East
- Ballpark: Oriole Park at Camden Yards
- City: Baltimore, Maryland
- Record: 66–96 (.407)
- Divisional place: 5th
- Owners: Peter Angelos
- General managers: Andy MacPhail
- Managers: Dave Trembley, Juan Samuel, Buck Showalter
- Television: MASN; WJZ-TV (CBS 13) (Gary Thorne, Jim Palmer, Mike Flanagan)
- Radio: Baltimore Orioles Radio Network (Joe Angel, Fred Manfra)

The Baltimore Orioles 2010 season was the 110th season in franchise history, 57th in Baltimore, and 19th at Oriole Park at Camden Yards.

== Offseason ==
The Orioles made many significant roster moves prior to the 2010 season. The team parted ways with several contributors from the 2009 season including Aubrey Huff, and Melvin Mora who was the team's longest tenured player. Miguel Tejada returned to the team to replace Mora at third base and brought in Garrett Atkins to play first. The Orioles also looked to improve the pitching staff by trading for veteran Kevin Millwood from the Texas Rangers and signing free agent closer Michael Gonzalez.

== Regular season ==
Despite some predictions that the Orioles would have one of their best seasons in years (possibly even finishing with a .500 winning average), the Orioles continued to struggle throughout the first half of the season. The Orioles 2010 season got off to a horrendous start the team going 2–16 to start the season, last in the league by some margin and the second-worst in franchise history. On April 12, the team set a then-club record for the lowest paid attendance in Camden Yards history as only 9,129 attended the game versus the Tampa Bay Rays. They would end the month of April 5–18. May would be only slightly better as the team posted a 10–18 record for the month. On June 4, 2010. the Orioles fired manager Dave Trembley after compiling a record of 187 wins and 283 losses since being promoted during the 2007 season. At the time they were on an 8-game losing streak and had the worst record in the league at 15–39. Trembley was replaced by third base coach Juan Samuel on an interim basis.

The managerial change accomplished little as the team's struggles continued under Samuel. Despite sweeping a four-game series from the Texas Rangers in Texas to head into the All-Star break, the Orioles went 29–59 in the first half. The team went 7–19 in the month of July.

On July 29, the Orioles hired Buck Showalter to be the team's full-time manager. He was introduced on August 2 and made his debut on August 3, by which time Samuel's record as manager was 17–34. Showalter chose to wear the number 26 in honor of his friend and former Orioles manager Johnny Oates. It was announced that Juan Samuel would not resume his role as third base coach and would instead take on a new role as a Dominican scout for the team.

With Showalter in the dugout the Orioles went 17–11 in August, their first winning month all season and first winning August since 2004. However, on August 29, the Orioles became the first team to be mathematically eliminated from playoff contention for the MLB 2010 season.

The Orioles finished out the season by going 17–13 in the months of September and October, making the team 34–23 under Showalter. This was the best record of any AL team over the same stretch of time, one commentator stating that "The Orioles had two different seasons. Before Buck and After Buck."

2010 also marked the first time since 2004 that the Orioles improved on their previous season's win total. Their final record for the 2010 season was 66–96.

=== Roster ===
2010 Baltimore Orioles
Roster
Pitchers: 34 Matt Albers; 57 Jake Arrieta; 35 Brad Bergesen; 49 Jason Berken; 53 Alberto Castillo; 41 Armando Gabino; 51 Michael Gonzalez; 46 Jeremy Guthrie; 27 Mark Hendrickson; 29 David Hernandez; 43 Jim Johnson; 50 Frank Mata; 17 Brian Matusz; 26 Cla Meredith; 31 Kam Mickolio; 34 Kevin Millwood; 13 Will Ohman; 40 Troy Patton; 55 Alfredo Simón; 24 Chris Tillman; 19 Koji Uehara; 54 Henricus VandenHurk; 47 Pedro Viola	Catchers: 47,9 Jake Fox; 15 Craig Tatum; 32 Matt Wieters; Infielders: 12 Robert Andino; 25 Garrett Atkins; 25 Josh Bell; 40 Rhyne Hughes; 3 César Izturis; 2 Julio Lugo; 40 Scott Moore; 1 Brian Roberts; 30 Luke Scott; 58 Brandon Snyder; 6 Justin Turner; 23 Ty Wigginton; Outfielders: 10 Adam Jones; 21 Nick Markakis; 16 Lou Montañez; 6 Corey Patterson; 18 Félix Pie; 14 Nolan Reimold	Manager: 11 Juan Samuel; 26 Buck Showalter; 47 Dave Trembley; Coaches: 52 Gary Allenson (third base); 48 Terry Crowley (hitting); 28 Jeff Datz (bench); 36 Alan Dunn (bullpen); 39 Rick Kranitz (pitching); 11 Juan Samuel (third base); 38 John Shelby (first base)

== Season standings ==
=== American League East ===
AL East
Team	W	L	Pct.	GB	Home	Road
Tampa Bay Rays	96	66	.593	—	49‍–‍32	47‍–‍34
New York Yankees	95	67	.586	1	52‍–‍29	43‍–‍38
Boston Red Sox	89	73	.549	7	46‍–‍35	43‍–‍38
Toronto Blue Jays	85	77	.525	11	45‍–‍33	40‍–‍44
Baltimore Orioles	66	96	.407	30	37‍–‍44	29‍–‍52

=== American League Wild Card ===
Division winners
Team	W	L	Pct.
Tampa Bay Rays	96	66	.593
Minnesota Twins	94	68	.580
Texas Rangers	90	72	.556

Wild Card team (Top team qualifies for postseason)
Team	W	L	Pct.	GB
New York Yankees	95	67	.586	—
Boston Red Sox	89	73	.549	6
Chicago White Sox	88	74	.543	7
Toronto Blue Jays	85	77	.525	10
Detroit Tigers	81	81	.500	14
Oakland Athletics	81	81	.500	14
Los Angeles Angels of Anaheim	80	82	.494	15
Cleveland Indians	69	93	.426	26
Kansas City Royals	67	95	.414	28
Baltimore Orioles	66	96	.407	29
Seattle Mariners	61	101	.377	34

=== Record vs. opponents ===
2010 American League record Source: MLB Standings Grid – 2010
Team	BAL	BOS	CWS	CLE	DET	KC	LAA	MIN	NYY	OAK	SEA	TB	TEX	TOR	NL
Baltimore	–	9–9	4–3	3–3	5–5	2–4	6–0	3–5	5–13	3–7	3–6	7–11	6–4	3–15	7–11
Boston	9–9	–	1–6	4–4	3–3	4–3	9–1	3–2	9–9	4–5	7–3	7–11	4–6	12–6	13–5
Chicago	3–4	6–1	–	9–9	8–10	10–8	7–2	5–13	2–4	4–5	9–1	3–4	4–5	3–5	15–3
Cleveland	3–3	4–4	9–9	–	9–9	10–8	5–4	6–12	2–6	3–6	3–4	2–7	2–4	6–4	5–13
Detroit	5–5	3–3	10–8	9–9	–	10–8	6–4	9–9	4–4	3–3	3–5	1–6	3–6	4–4	11–7
Kansas City	4–2	3-4	9–10	8–10	8–10	–	3-7	5–13	3–5	3–6	5–4	4–4	2–7	3–3	8–10
Los Angeles	0–6	1–9	2–7	4–5	4–6	7–3	–	2–5	4–4	11–8	15–4	4–5	9–10	6–3	11–7
Minnesota	5–3	2–3	13–5	12–6	9–9	13–5	5–2	–	2–4	6–3	6-4	3–5	7–3	3–6	8–10
New York	13–5	9–9	4–2	6-2	4–4	5–3	4–4	4–2	–	9–1	6–4	8–10	4–4	8–10	11–7
Oakland	7–3	5–4	5–4	6–3	3–3	6–3	8–11	3–6	1–9	–	13–6	4–5	9–10	3–4	8–10
Seattle	6–3	3–7	1–9	4–3	5–3	4–5	4–15	4–6	4–6	6–13	–	2–7	7–12	2–3	9–9
Tampa Bay	11–7	11–7	4–3	7–2	6–1	4–4	5–4	5–3	10–8	5–4	7–2	–	4–2	10–8	7–11
Texas	4–6	6–4	5–4	4–2	6–3	7–2	10-9	3-7	4-4	10-9	12–7	2–4	–	3–7	14–4
Toronto	15–3	6–12	5–3	4–6	4–4	3–3	3–6	6–3	10–8	4–3	3–2	8–10	7–3	–	7–11

- Source: MLB Standings Grid – 2010

=== Game log ===
2010 game log
April (5–18)

#	Date	Opponent	Score	Win	Loss	Save	Attendance	Record
1	April 6	@ Rays	4–3	Soriano (1–0)	Gonzalez (0–1)		36,973	0–1
2	April 7	@ Rays	4–3	Garza (1–0)	Guthrie (0–1)	Soriano (1)	15,220	0–2
3	April 8	@ Rays	5–4	Matusz (1–0)	Ekstrom (0–1)	Gonzalez (1)	16,191	1–2
4	April 9	Blue Jays	7–6	Janssen (2–0)	Gonzalez (0–2)	Gregg (1)	48,891	1–3
5	April 10	Blue Jays	3–0	Eveland (1–0)	D. Hernandez (0–1)	Frasor (3)	21,148	1–4
6	April 11	Blue Jays	5–2	Janssen (3–0)	Millwood (0–1)	Gregg (2)	22,499	1–5
7	April 12	Rays	5–1	Garza (2–0)	Guthrie (0–2)		9,129	1–6
8	April 13	Rays	8–6	Cormier (1–0)	Albers (0–1)	Soriano (2)	13,731	1–7
9	April 14	Rays	9–1	Price (2–0)	Bergesen (0–1)		10,248	1–8
10	April 15	@ Athletics	6–2	Sheets (1–0)	D. Hernandez (0–2)		17,382	1–9
11	April 16	@ Athletics	4–2	Braden (2–0)	Millwood (0–2)	Bailey (1)	12,225	1–10
12	April 17	@ Athletics	4–3	Blevins (2–0)	Johnson (0–1)		15,072	1–11
13	April 18	@ Athletics	8–3	Matusz (2–0)	Anderson (1–1)	Johnson (1)	14,451	2–11
14	April 19	@ Mariners	8–2	Fister (2–1)	Bergesen (0–2)		14,528	2–12
15	April 20	@ Mariners	3–1	Vargas (2–1)	D. Hernandez (0–3)	Aardsma (6)	15,931	2–13
16	April 21	@ Mariners	4–1	F. Hernández (2–0)	Millwood (0–3)		18,401	2–14
17	April 23	@ Red Sox	4–3	Delcarmen (1–1)	Albers (0–2)	Papelbon (4)	37,367	2–15
18	April 24	@ Red Sox	7–6	Lackey (2–1)	Albers (0–3)	Papelbon (5)	38,017	2–16
19	April 25	@ Red Sox	7–6	Johnson (1–1)	Atchinson (0–1)	Meredith (1)	37,102	3–16
20	April 27	Yankees	5–4	Castillo (1–0)	Robertson (0–1)	Simón (1)	20,536	4–16
21	April 28	Yankees	8–3	Sabathia (3–1)	Guthrie (0–3)		17,248	4–17
22	April 29	Yankees	4–0	A. J. Burnett (3–0)	Matusz (2–1)		26,439	4–18
23	April 30	Red Sox	5–4 (10)	Albers (1–3)	Ramírez (0–1)		30,668	5–18

May (10–18)

#	Date	Opponent	Score	Win	Loss	Save	Attendance	Record
24	May 1	Red Sox	12–9	Bergesen (1–2)	Matsuzaka (0–1)	Simón (2)	35,164	6–18
25	May 2	Red Sox	3–2 (10)	Albers (2–3)	Papelbon (1–2)		34,255	7–18
26	May 3	@ Yankees	4–1	Sabathia (4–1)	Guthrie (0–4)	Chamberlain (1)	41,571	7–19
27	May 4	@ Yankees	4–1	A. J. Burnett (4–0)	Matusz (2–2)	Chamberlain (2)	43,260	7–20
28	May 5	@ Yankees	7–5	Pettitte (4–0)	D. Hernandez (0–4)	Aceves (1)	43,425	7–21
29	May 6	@ Twins	2–0	Bergesen (2–2)	Pavano (3–3)	Simón (3)	38,489	8–21
30	May 8	@ Twins	7–3	Guthrie (1–4)	Liriano (4–1)		38,608	9–21
31	May 8	@ Twins	6–1	Baker (4–2)	Millwood (0–4)		38,863	9–22
32	May 9	@ Twins	6–0	Blackburn (3–1)	Matusz (2–3)		38,641	9–23
33	May 11	Mariners	5–1	Lee (1–1)	D. Hernandez (0–4)	League (1)	12,614	9–24
34	May 12	Mariners	5–2	Bergesen (3–2)	Rowland-Smith (0–3)	Simón (4)	11,448	10–24
35	May 13	Mariners	6–5	Hendrickson (1–0)	League (3–3)	Simón (5)	20,938	11–24
36	May 14	Indians	8–1	Guthrie (2–4)	Masterson (0–4)		25,902	12–24
37	May 15	Indians	8–2	Talbot (5–2)	Simón (0–1)		29,545	12–25
38	May 16	Indians	5–1	Westbrook (2–2)	Hendrickson (1–1)		29,323	12–26
39	May 17	Royals	4–3	Davies (3–2)	Bergesen (3–3)	Soria (10)	9,299	12–27
40	May 18	Royals	4–3 (10)	Simón (1–1)	Bullington (0–1)		9,715	13–27
41	May 19	@ Rangers	4–3	Francisco (5–3)	Meredith (0–1)		22,321	13–28
42	May 20	@ Rangers	13–7	Feldman (2–4)	Matusz (2–4)		17,304	13–29
43	May 21	@ Nationals	5–3	D. Hernandez (1–5)	Olsen (2–2)	Simón (6)	27,378	14–29
44	May 22	@ Nationals	7–6	Walker (1–0)	Hendrickson (1–2)	Capps (16)	30,290	14–30
45	May 23	@ Nationals	4–3 (10)	Slaten (2–0)	Meredith (0–2)		27,535	14–31
46	May 25	Athletics	5–1	Guthrie (3–4)	Ross (1–3)		14,686	15–31
47	May 26	Athletics	6–1	Cahill (3–2)	Matusz (2–5)		19,153	15–32
48	May 27	Athletics	7–5	Wuertz (2–0)	Hendrickson (1–3)	Bailey (9)	26,279	15–33
49	May 28	@ Blue Jays	5–0	Marcum (5–1)	Millwood (0–5)		16,360	15–34
50	May 29	@ Blue Jays	5–2	Cecil (5–2)	Berken (0–1)	Gregg (13)	16,194	15–35
51	May 30	@ Blue Jays	6–1	Romero (5–2)	Guthrie (3–5)		15,878	15–36

June (9–17)

#	Date	Opponent	Score	Win	Loss	Save	Attendance	Record
52	June 1	@ Yankees	3–1	Vasquez (4–5)	Matusz (2–6)	Rivera (11)	43,059	15–37
53	June 2	@ Yankees	9–1	Hughes (7–1)	Bergesen (3–4)		44,465	15–38
54	June 3	@ Yankees	6–3	Sabathia (5–3)	Millwood (0–6)	Rivera (12)	44,927	15–39
55	June 4	Red Sox	11–0	Buchholz (8–3)	Tillman (0–1)		30,070	15–40
56	June 5	Red Sox	8–2	Lester (7–2)	Guthrie (3–6)		40,001	15–41
57	June 6	Red Sox	4–3 (11)	D. Hernandez (2–5)	Okajima (2–2)		27,774	16–41
58	June 8	Yankees	12–7	Hughes (8–1)	Millwood (0–7)		23,171	16–42
59	June 9	Yankees	4–2	Sabathia (6–3)	Tillman (0–2)	Rivera (14)	16,451	16–43
60	June 10	Yankees	4–3	Arrieta (1–0)	A. J. Burnett (6–4)	D. Hernandez (1)	27,064	17–43
61	June 11	Mets	5–1	Dickey (4–0)	Guthrie (3–7)		28,554	17–44
62	June 12	Mets	3–1	Takahashi (5–2)	Matusz (2–7)	F. Rodríguez (13)	42,248	17–45
63	June 13	Mets	11–4	Pelfrey (9–1)	Millwood (0–8)		24,848	17–46
64	June 14	@ Giants	10–2	Sánchez (5–5)	Tillman (0–3)		33,822	17–47
65	June 15	@ Giants	4–1	Arrieta (2–0)	J. Martinez (0–1)	D. Hernandez (2)	35,498	18–47
66	June 16	@ Giants	6–3	Lincecum (7–2)	Guthrie (3–8)	B. Wilson (18)	38,485	18–48
67	June 18	@ Padres	3–2	Bell (3–0)	D. Hernandez (2–6)		25,167	18–49
68	June 19	@ Padres	5–4	Millwood (1–8)	Richard (4–4)	Simón (7)	28,183	19–49
69	June 20	@ Padres	9–4	Garland (7–5)	Arrieta (2–1)		28,029	19–50
70	June 22	Marlins	10–4	Sánchez (7–4)	Guthrie (3–9)		14,821	19–51
71	June 23	Marlins	7–5	Nolasco (6–6)	Matusz (2–8)	Núñez (16)	17,720	19–52
72	June 24	Marlins	11–5	Millwood (2–8)	Robertson (5–6)		15,397	20–52
73	June 25	Nationals	7–6	Simón (2–1)	Clippard (8–4)		43,484	21–52
74	June 26	Nationals	6–5	Berken (1–1)	S. Burnett (0–4)	Simón (8)	28,635	22–52
75	June 27	Nationals	4–3	D. Hernandez (3–6)	Clippard (8–5)	Simón (9)	22,951	23–52
76	June 29	Athletics	4–2	Mazzaro (3–2)	Matusz (2–9)	Bailey (15)	11,987	23–53
77	June 30	Athletics	9–6	Albers (3–3)	Bowers (0–1)	Simón (10)	21,392	24–53

July (7–19)

#	Date	Opponent	Score	Win	Loss	Save	Attendance	Record
78	July 1	Athletics	8–1	Cahill (8–2)	Arrieta (2–2)		15,712	24–54
79	July 2	@ Red Sox	3–2	Wakefield (3–6)	Bergesen (3–5)	Papelbon (19)	38,067	24–55
80	July 3	@ Red Sox	9–3	Lester (10–3)	Guthrie (3–10)		38,106	24–56
81	July 4	@ Red Sox	6–1	Matusz (3–9)	Lackey (9–4)		37,742	25–56
82	July 5	@ Tigers	12–9	Bonine (4–0)	Hendrickson (1–4)		26,432	25–57
83	July 6	@ Tigers	7–5 (11)	Perry (2–4)	D. Hernandez (3–7)		22,532	25–58
84	July 7	@ Tigers	4–2	Scherzer (6–6)	Bergesen (3–6)	Coke (1)	22,837	25–59
85	July 8	@ Rangers	6–4	D. Hernandez (4–7)	Francisco (6–4)	Simón (11)	16,240	26–59
86	July 9	@ Rangers	7–6 (11)	Berken (2–1)	Nippert (3–4)	Simón (12)	24,216	27–59
87	July 10	@ Rangers	6–1	Tillman (1–3)	Lee (8–4)		41,093	28–59
88	July 11	@ Rangers	4–1	Arrieta (3–2)	C. J. Wilson (7–5)	Simón (13)	24,566	29–59
89	July 16	Blue Jays	4–2	Romero (7–6)	Bergesen (3–7)	Gregg (21)	18,120	29–60
90	July 17	Blue Jays	3–2	Morrow (6–6)	Berken (2–2)	Camp (1)	28,518	29–61
91	July 18	Blue Jays	10–1	Marcum (8–4)	Matusz (3–10)		14,032	29–62
92	July 19	Rays	1–8	Davis (7–9)	Tillman (1–4)		12,792	29–63
93	July 20	Rays	11–10 (13)	Uehara (1–0)	Cormier (3–2)		16,623	30–63
94	July 21	Rays	4–5	Shields (8–9)	Bergesen (3–8)	Soriano (24)	19,286	30–64
95	July 22	Twins	0–5	Pavano (12–6)	Millwood (2–9)		20,108	30–65
96	July 23	Twins	3–2	Guthrie (4–10)	Slama (0–1)	Simón (14)	19,013	31–65
97	July 24	Twins	2–7	Baker (8–9)	Matusz (3–11)		22,299	31–66
98	July 25	Twins	4–10	Slowey (9–5)	Arrieta (3–3)		17,408	31–67
99	July 26	@ Blue Jays	5–9	Morrow (7–6)	Bergesen (3–9)	Purcey (1)	17,422	31–68
100	July 27	@ Blue Jays	2–8	Romero (8–7)	Millwood (2–10)		16,862	31–69
101	July 28	@ Blue Jays	0–5	Mills (1–0)	Guthrie (4–11)		17,041	31–70
102	July 29	@ Royals	6–5 (11)	D. Hernandez (5–7)	Wood (0–2)	Simón (15)	17,220	32–70
103	July 30	@ Royals	5–7	Wood (1–2)	Simón (2–2)		21,537	32–71
104	July 31	@ Royals	3–4	Greinke (7–10)	D. Hernandez (5–8)	Soria (28)	25,055	32–72

August (17–11)

#	Date	Opponent	Score	Win	Loss	Save	Attendance	Record
105	August 1	@ Royals	5–4	Chen (6–5)	Millwood (2–11)	Soria (29)	14,662	32–73
106	August 3	Angels	6–3	Guthrie (5–11)	Rodríguez (0–2)		16,723	33–73
107	August 4	Angels	9–7	Matusz (4–11)	Santana (10–8)	Simón (16)	13,467	34–73
108	August 5	Angels	5–4	Berken (3–2)	F. Rodríguez (0–3)		17,362	35–73
109	August 6	White Sox	2–1 (10)	Simón (3–2)	Peña (3–2)		19, 687	36–73
110	August 7	White Sox	4–2	Floyd (8–8)	Berken (3–3)	Putz (3)	24, 929	36–74
111	August 8	White Sox	4–3	Guthrie (6–11)	Buehrle (10–9)	Simón (17)	18,283	37–74
112	August 9	White Sox	3–2 (10)	Albers (4–3)	Putz (5–3)		14,135	38–74
113	August 10	@ Indians	14–8	Arrieta (4–3)	Masterson (6–11)		13,541	39–74
114	August 11	@ Indians	3–1	Bergesen (4–9)	Tomlin (1–2)		11,155	40–74
115	August 12	@ Indians	4–1	Gómez (3–0)	Millwood (2–12)	Perez (14)	14,533	40–75
116	August 13	@ Rays	5–0	Guthrie (7–11)	Shields (10–11)		24,277	41–75
117	August 14	@ Rays	7–3	Sonnanstine (3–1)	Matusz (4–12)		36,189	41–76
118	August 15	@ Rays	3–2	Hellickson (3–0)	Arrieta (4–4)	Soriano (33)	29,654	41–77
119	August 16	Mariners	5–4	Albers (5–3)	White (0–1)		12,375	42–77
120	August 17	Mariners	4–0	French (2–3)	Millwood (2–13)	League (3)	14,739	42–78
121	August 18	Mariners	6–5	Pauley (2–4)	Guthrie (7–12)	Aardsma (1)	11,213	42–79
122	August 19	Rangers	4–0	Matusz (5–12)	Lewis (9–10)		14,635	43–79
123	August 20	Rangers	2–0	C. J. Wilson (12–5)	Arrieta (4–5)	Feliz (30)	18,751	43–80
124	August 21	Rangers	8–6	Bergesen (5–9)	Lee (10–7)	Uehara (1)	23,041	44–80
125	August 22	Rangers	6–4	Hunter (10–2)	Millwood (2–14)	Feliz (31)	14,788	44–81
126	August 24	@ White Sox	7–5	Floyd (9–10)	Guthrie (7–13)	Jenks (24)	26,263	44–82
127	August 25	@ White Sox	4–2	Matusz (6–12)	Buehrle (12–10)	Uehara (2)	23,733	45–82
128	August 26	@ White Sox	8–0	E. Jackson (2–0)	Arrieta (4–6)		23,898	45–83
129	August 27	@ Angels	3–1	Bergesen (6–9)	Bell (1–4)	Uehara (3)	43,127	46–83
130	August 28	@ Angels	5–0	Millwood (3–14)	Kazmir (8–12)		43,127	47–83
131	August 29	@ Angels	1–0	Guthrie (8–13)	Weaver (11–10)	Uehara (4)	38,232	48–83
132	August 31	Red Sox	5–2	Matusz (7–12)	Beckett (4–4)	Uehara (5)	18,247	49–83

September (14–12)

#	Date	Opponent	Score	Win	Loss	Save	Attendance	Record
133	September 1	Red Sox	9–6	Lester (15–8)	Hendrickson (1–5)	Papelbon (34)	16,210	49–84
134	September 2	Red Sox	6–4	Matsuzaka (9–4)	Bergesen (6–10)	Papelbon (35)	26,954	49–85
135	September 3	Rays	4–1	Garza (14–7)	Millwood (3–15)	Soriano (41)	13,507	49–86
136	September 4	Rays	8–4	Guthrie (9–13)	Shields (13–12)		18,943	50–86
137	September 5	Rays	8–7	Simón (4–2)	Wheeler (2–2)	Uehara (6)	28,268	51–86
138	September 6	@ Yankees	4–3	Matusz (8–12)	A. J. Burnett (10–13)	Uehara (7)	46,103	52–86
139	September 7	@ Yankees	6–2	Arrieta (5–6)	Sabathia (19–6)		46,432	53–86
140	September 8	@ Yankees	3–2	Chamberlain (3–4)	Uehara (1–1)		44,163	53–87
141	September 10	@ Tigers	6–3	D. Hernandez (6–8)	Coke (7–5)	Uehara (8)	28,575	54–87
142	September 11	@ Tigers	5–3	Guthrie (10–13)	Scherzer (10–10)	Uehara (9)	28,139	55–87
143	September 12	@ Tigers	6–2	Verlander (16–8)	Gonzalez (0–3)		24,170	55–88
144	September 13	Blue Jays	6–2 (11)	D. Hernandez (7–8)	Tallet (2–6)		9,882	56–88
145	September 14	Blue Jays	11–3	Arrieta (6–6)	Hill (0–2)		16,589	57–88
146	September 15	Blue Jays	3–1	Bergesen (7–10)	Drabek (0–1)		13,651	58–88
147	September 17	Yankees	4–3	D. Robertson (4–4)	Uehara (1–2)	Rivera (6)	32,874	58–89
148	September 18	Yankees	11–3	Sabathia (20–6)	Guthrie (10–14)		48,775	58–90
149	September 19	Yankees	4–3 (11)	Gonzalez (1–3)	D. Robertson (4–5)		39,537	59–90
150	September 20	@ Red Sox	4–2	D. Hernandez (8–8)	Matsuzaka (9–6)	Uehara (10)	37,560	60–90
151	September 21	@ Red Sox	9–1	Bergesen (8–10)	Atchison (2–3)		37,464	61–90
152	September 22	@ Red Sox	6–1	Lackey (13–11)	Millwood (3–16)		37,729	61–91
153	September 24	@ Blue Jays	6–4	Cecil (14–7)	Tillman (1–5)	Carlson (1)	13,412	61–92
154	September 25	@ Blue Jays	5–4 (11)	Purcey (1–1)	Hendrickson (1–6)		21,504	61–93
155	September 26	@ Blue Jays	5–2	Marcum (13–8)	VandenHurk (0–1)	Frasor (4)	17,831	61–94
156	September 27	@ Rays	4–0	Matusz (9–12)	Davis (12–10)		12,446	62–94
157	September 28	@ Rays	5–0	Price (19–6)	Bergesen (8–11)		17,891	62–95
158	September 29	@ Rays	2–0	Millwood (4–16)	Niemann (11–8)	Uehara (11)	36,973	63–95

October (3–1)

#	Date	Opponent	Score	Win	Loss	Save	Attendance	Record
159	October 1	Tigers	10–6	Tillman (2–5)	Bonderman (8–10)			64–95
160	October 1	Tigers	2–1	Guthrie (11–14)	Porcello (10–12)	Uehara (12)	20,870	65–95
161	October 2	Tigers	2–1	Matusz (10–12)	Galarraga (4–9)	Uehara (13)	35,332	66–95
162	October 3	Tigers	4–2	Schlereth (2–0)	Bergesen (8–12)	Valverde (26)	23,914	66–96

Please do not edit this line: OgreBot End-->

== Player stats ==
=== Batting ===
Note: G = Games played; AB = At bats; R = Runs scored; H = Hits; 2B = Doubles; 3B = Triples; HR = Home runs; RBI = Runs batted in; AVG = Batting average; SB = Stolen bases

Player	G	AB	R	H	2B	3B	HR	RBI	AVG	SB
Robert Andino	16	61	6	18	4	0	2	6	.295	1
Jake Arrieta	2	3	0	0	0	0	0	0	.000	0
Garrett Atkins	44	140	5	30	7	0	1	9	.214	0
Josh Bell	53	159	15	34	5	0	3	12	.214	0
Brad Bergesen	1	3	0	1	0	0	0	0	.333	0
Jake Fox	38	100	10	22	5	1	5	10	.220	0
Jeremy Guthrie	1	3	0	0	0	0	0	0	.000	0
David Hernandez	4	3	0	0	0	0	0	0	.000	0
Rhyne Hughes	14	47	3	10	2	0	0	4	.213	0
César Izturis	150	473	42	109	13	1	1	28	.230	11
Adam Jones	149	581	76	165	25	5	19	69	.284	7
Julio Lugo	93	241	26	60	4	2	0	20	.249	5
Nick Markakis	160	629	79	187	45	3	12	60	.297	7
Brian Matusz	1	2	0	0	0	0	0	0	.000	0
Kevin Millwood	2	5	0	0	0	0	0	0	.000	0
Lou Montanez	26	57	2	8	0	0	0	3	.140	1
Scott Moore	41	86	7	17	5	0	2	10	.209	3
Corey Patterson	90	308	43	83	16	1	8	32	.269	21
Félix Pie	82	288	39	79	15	5	5	31	.274	5
Nolan Reimold	39	116	9	24	5	0	3	14	.207	0
Brian Roberts	59	230	28	64	14	0	4	15	.278	1
Luke Scott	131	447	70	127	29	1	27	72	.284	2
Brandon Snyder	10	20	1	6	2	0	0	3	.300	0
Craig Tatum	43	114	11	32	4	0	0	9	.281	1
Miguel Tejada	97	401	40	108	16	0	7	39	.269	0
Chris Tillman	1	1	0	0	0	0	0	0	.000	0
Justin Turner	5	9	0	0	0	0	0	0	.000	0
Matt Wieters	130	446	37	111	22	1	11	55	.249	0
Ty Wigginton	154	581	63	144	29	1	22	76	.248	0
Team totals	162	5554	613	1440	264	21	133	577	.259	76

=== Pitching ===
Note: W = Wins; L = Losses; ERA = Earned run average; G = Games pitched; GS = Games started; SV = Saves; IP = Innings pitched; R = Runs allowed; ER = Earned runs allowed; BB = Walks allowed; K = Strikeouts

Player	W	L	ERA	G	GS	SV	IP	R	ER	BB	K
Matt Albers	5	3	4.52	62	0	0	75.2	41	38	34	49
Jake Arrieta	6	6	4.66	18	18	0	100.1	57	52	48	52
Brad Bergesen	8	12	4.98	30	28	0	170.0	104	94	51	81
Jason Berken	3	3	3.03	41	0	0	62.1	24	21	19	45
Alberto Pastillo	1	0	10.13	14	0	0	10.2	12	12	6	11
Armando Gabino	0	0	13.50	5	0	0	4.2	7	7	3	2
Michael Gonzalez	1	3	4.01	29	0	1	24.2	11	11	14	31
Jeremy Guthrie	11	14	3.83	32	32	0	209.1	93	89	50	119
Mark Hendrickson	1	6	5.26	52	1	0	75.1	47	44	20	55
David Hernandez	8	8	4.31	41	8	2	79.1	40	38	42	72
Jim Johnson	1	1	3.42	26	0	1	26.1	11	10	5	22
Frank Mata	0	0	7.79	15	0	0	17.1	16	15	8	9
Brian Matusz	10	12	4.68	32	32	0	175.2	88	84	63	143
Cla Meredith	0	2	5.40	21	0	1	15.0	9	9	4	7
Kam Mickolio	0	0	7.36	3	0	0	3.2	3	3	3	4
Kevin Millwood	4	16	5.10	31	31	0	190.2	116	108	65	132
Will Ohman	0	0	3.30	51	0	0	30.0	12	11	18	29
Troy Patton	0	0	0.00	1	0	0	0.2	0	0	1	1
Chris Tillman	2	5	5.87	11	11	0	53.2	37	35	31	31
Alfredo Simón	4	2	4.93	49	0	17	49.1	30	27	22	37
Koji Uehara	1	2	2.86	43	0	13	44.0	15	14	5	55
Henricus VandenHurk	0	1	4.96	7	0	0	16.1	10	9	7	17
Pedro Viola	0	0	13.50	2	0	0	1.1	2	2	1	3
Team totals	66	96	4.59	162	162	35	1436.1	785	733	520	1007

== Farm system ==
Level	Team	League	Manager
AAA	Norfolk Tides	International League	Gary Allenson and Bobby Dickerson
AA	Bowie Baysox	Eastern League	Brad Komminsk
A	Frederick Keys	Carolina League	Orlando Gómez
A	Delmarva Shorebirds	South Atlantic League	Ryan Minor
A-Short Season	Aberdeen IronBirds	New York–Penn League	Gary Kendall
Rookie	Bluefield Orioles	Appalachian League	Einar Díaz
Rookie	GCL Orioles	Gulf Coast League	Ramón Sambo
