= 2010 Los Angeles Angels season =

Major League Baseball season

2010 Los Angeles Angels
- League: American League
- Division: West
- Ballpark: Angel Stadium
- City: Anaheim, California
- Record: 80–82 (.494)
- Divisional place: 3rd
- Owner: Arte Moreno
- General manager: Tony Reagins
- Manager: Mike Scioscia
- Television: FSN West; KCOP (My 13) (Victor Rojas, Mark Gubicza)
- Radio: KLAA (AM 830) KSPN (AM 710) (Terry Smith, José Mota) Spanish: KWKW (AM 1330)
- Stats: ESPN.com; Baseball Reference

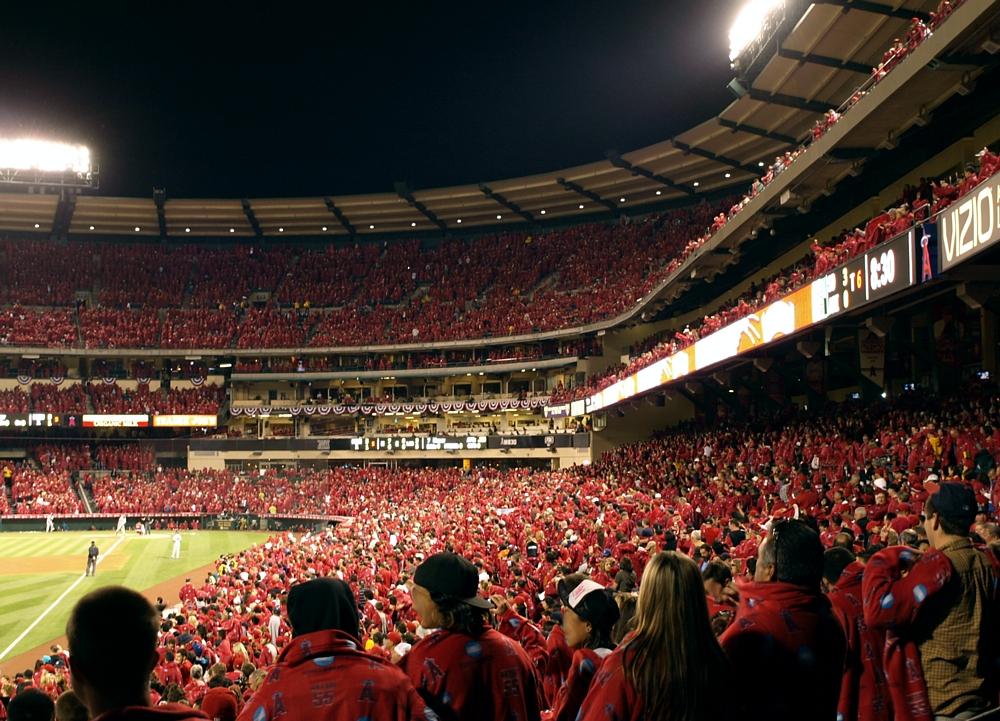
Spectators watching an Angels game in 2010

The 2010 Los Angeles Angels season was the franchise's 50th season and 45th in Anaheim. The Angels began this season as the three-time defending American League West champions. The Angels failed to improved on their 97–65 record from 2009 and missed the postseason for the first time since 2006, along with clinching their first losing season since 2003 by finishing 80–82. During the 2010 season, the Angels hosted the MLB All-Star Game at Angel Stadium for the third time in franchise history.

== 2009–2010 offseason ==
Going into the offseason, The Los Angeles Angels of Anaheim had four crucial players going into free agency, right fielder Bobby Abreu, ace John Lackey, leadoff third baseman Chone Figgins, and aging slugger Vladimir Guerrero. According to ESPN, one of the top ten offseason questions was "Will the Angels be able to keep their team together?"

On November 5, 2009, the first day eligible players could file for free agency, the Angels signed Bobby Abreu to a two-year deal, with a club option for 2012. Soon after, general manager Tony Reagins stated the team's focus was on re-signing Lackey and Figgins. A few days later, owner Arte Moreno added he wanted to retain both Lackey and Figgins, but with limited payroll options, they would have to choose just one of the two stars. "If you look at what they're asking, you can't bring both of them back", Moreno said. Negotiations with Guerrero also stalled, as Moreno added, "We've talked to his agent just recently. We talked to his agent two years ago. We could never get close enough. It's very emotional for us."

After signing Abreu, Los Angeles Times reporter Mike DiGiovanna estimated that GM Tony Reagins had roughly $12 million to spend to keep payroll at the same level as the previous year. With about $12 million to work with, Reagins said. "We do have money available to be active in free agency, and there are some areas we can work with that will give us more flexibility. We feel we can take on some payroll, but we're going to have to be creative."

The Angels offered arbitration to both Lackey and Figgins on December 2, but not to 39-year-old Darren Oliver, who had just come off a surprisingly good season, enough to earn him an Elias Sports Bureau ranking as a Type A Free Agent. This move assured the Angels of receiving first-round draft picks should Lackey or Figgins decide to sign elsewhere.

On December 8, Figgins finalized a deal with division rival the Seattle Mariners. Sports Illustrated's Cliff Corcoran said the Mariners "might have actually done the Angels a favor" by providing an opening for prospect Brandon Wood to assume third base and free up money to re-sign ace starter John Lackey. The Los Angeles Times reported that the Angels' "reluctance to add a fourth year to their offer was a huge factor in the infielder's decision to sign with Seattle." Because of Figgins' status as a Type A Free Agent, the Angels received a compensatory draft pick from the Mariners.

Although the Angels were considered a front-runner to sign power hitting left fielder Jason Bay, manager Mike Scioscia told the media he would prefer to make a long-term investment in pitching instead of his offense. "I don't think you can ever have too much pitching", Scioscia said. "So if you are going to make a financial commitment, certainly the pitching end of it is something you're going to consider." While Lackey's free agency lingered, the Angels were rumored to have offered Toronto left-handed starter Joe Saunders, shortstop Erick Aybar and outfield prospect Peter Bourjos in exchange for Toronto ace Roy Halladay. However, when Angels GM Tony Reagins was asked about the rumored trade, he had 'no reaction', adding, "It's not worth commenting on. A lot of things get thrown around and aren't accurate." Yet, a few days later on December 14, 2009, sources indicated that Halladay would sign with the Philadelphia Phillies in a trade sending Cliff Lee to the Mariners, and that Lackey would sign with the Boston Red Sox.

Later, Moreno told the Los Angeles Times that the decision not to bid higher for Figgins and Lackey wasn't based on money 'but on age and contract length, concerns about their long-term health and the availability of cheaper but attractive alternatives. On the same day however, sources indicated that the Angels had signed Japanese slugger Hideki Matsui to a $6.5 million one-year contract. Matsui would likely only hit as designated hitter because of his weak knees, filling the role for the former slugger Vladimir Guerrero, who both manager Scoscia and GM Reagins confirmed wouldn't come back after the signing of Matsui.

The Angels bullpen also saw turnover. On December 12, the Angels announced they would not offer reliever José Arredondo a contract after learning he would undergo elbow reconstruction and be unavailable in the 2010 season. Soon after, on December 22, veteran reliever Darren Oliver signed with division rival Texas Rangers. The Angels signed closer Fernando Rodney as a possible setup man or as an alternative closer for the Brian Fuentes.

== Regular season ==
=== Season standings ===
==== American League West ====
AL West
Team	W	L	Pct.	GB	Home	Road
Texas Rangers	90	72	.556	—	51‍–‍30	39‍–‍42
Oakland Athletics	81	81	.500	9	47‍–‍34	34‍–‍47
Los Angeles Angels	80	82	.494	10	43‍–‍38	37‍–‍44
Seattle Mariners	61	101	.377	29	35‍–‍46	26‍–‍55

==== American League Wild Card ====
Division winners
Team	W	L	Pct.
Tampa Bay Rays	96	66	.593
Minnesota Twins	94	68	.580
Texas Rangers	90	72	.556

Wild Card team (Top team qualifies for postseason)
Team	W	L	Pct.	GB
New York Yankees	95	67	.586	—
Boston Red Sox	89	73	.549	6
Chicago White Sox	88	74	.543	7
Toronto Blue Jays	85	77	.525	10
Detroit Tigers	81	81	.500	14
Oakland Athletics	81	81	.500	14
Los Angeles Angels	80	82	.494	15
Cleveland Indians	69	93	.426	26
Kansas City Royals	67	95	.414	28
Baltimore Orioles	66	96	.407	29
Seattle Mariners	61	101	.377	34

==== Record vs. opponents ====
2010 American League record Source: MLB Standings Grid – 2010
Team	BAL	BOS	CWS	CLE	DET	KC	LAA	MIN	NYY	OAK	SEA	TB	TEX	TOR	NL
Baltimore	–	9–9	4–3	3–3	5–5	2–4	6–0	3–5	5–13	3–7	3–6	7–11	6–4	3–15	7–11
Boston	9–9	–	1–6	4–4	3–3	4–3	9–1	3–2	9–9	4–5	7–3	7–11	4–6	12–6	13–5
Chicago	3–4	6–1	–	9–9	8–10	10–8	7–2	5–13	2–4	4–5	9–1	3–4	4–5	3–5	15–3
Cleveland	3–3	4–4	9–9	–	9–9	10–8	5–4	6–12	2–6	3–6	3–4	2–7	2–4	6–4	5–13
Detroit	5–5	3–3	10–8	9–9	–	10–8	6–4	9–9	4–4	3–3	3–5	1–6	3–6	4–4	11–7
Kansas City	4–2	3-4	9–10	8–10	8–10	–	3-7	5–13	3–5	3–6	5–4	4–4	2–7	3–3	8–10
Los Angeles	0–6	1–9	2–7	4–5	4–6	7–3	–	2–5	4–4	11–8	15–4	4–5	9–10	6–3	11–7
Minnesota	5–3	2–3	13–5	12–6	9–9	13–5	5–2	–	2–4	6–3	6-4	3–5	7–3	3–6	8–10
New York	13–5	9–9	4–2	6-2	4–4	5–3	4–4	4–2	–	9–1	6–4	8–10	4–4	8–10	11–7
Oakland	7–3	5–4	5–4	6–3	3–3	6–3	8–11	3–6	1–9	–	13–6	4–5	9–10	3–4	8–10
Seattle	6–3	3–7	1–9	4–3	5–3	4–5	4–15	4–6	4–6	6–13	–	2–7	7–12	2–3	9–9
Tampa Bay	11–7	11–7	4–3	7–2	6–1	4–4	5–4	5–3	10–8	5–4	7–2	–	4–2	10–8	7–11
Texas	4–6	6–4	5–4	4–2	6–3	7–2	10-9	3-7	4-4	10-9	12–7	2–4	–	3–7	14–4
Toronto	15–3	6–12	5–3	4–6	4–4	3–3	3–6	6–3	10–8	4–3	3–2	8–10	7–3	–	7–11

- Source: MLB Standings Grid – 2010

=== Game log ===
2010 Game Log
April (12–12)

#	Date	Opponent	Score	Win	Loss	Save	Attendance	Record	Stadium	Box	GB
1	April 5	Twins	6–3	Weaver (1–0)	Baker (0–1)	Fuentes (1)	43,504	1–0	Angel Stadium	W1	0
2	April 6	Twins	5–3	Blackburn (1–0)	Saunders (0–1)	Rauch (1)	43,510	1–1	Angel Stadium	L1	−1/2
3	April 7	Twins	4–2	Pavano (1–0)	Santana (0–1)	Rauch (2)	41,533	1–2	Angel Stadium	L2	−1
4	April 8	Twins	10–1	Slowey (1–0)	Piñeiro (0–1)		39,709	1–3	Angel Stadium	L3	−2
5	April 9	Athletics	10–4	Gonzalez (1–0)	Palmer (0–1)		40,034	1–4	Angel Stadium	L4	−3
6	April 10	Athletics	4–3	Rodney (1–0)	Breslow (0–1)		40,249	2–4	Angel Stadium	W1	−2
7	April 11	Athletics	9–4	Braden (1–0)	Saunders (0–2)	Ross (1)	40,601	2–5	Angel Stadium	L1	−3
8	April 13	@ Yankees	7–5	Pettitte (1–0)	Santana (0–2)	Rivera (3)	49,293	2–6	Yankee Stadium	L2	−3 1/2
9	April 14	@ Yankees	5–3	Piñeiro (1–1)	Vázquez (0–2)	Rodney (1)	42,372	3–6	Yankee Stadium	W1	−2 1/2
10	April 15	@ Yankees	6–2	Hughes (1–0)	Kazmir (0–1)	Rivera (4)	44,722	3–7	Yankee Stadium	L1	−3 1/2
11	April 16	@ Blue Jays	7–5	Weaver (2–0)	Marcum (0–1)	Rodney (2)	14,779	4–7	Rogers Centre	W1	−3 1/2
12	April 17	@ Blue Jays	6–2	Saunders (1–2)	Tallet (1–1)	Rodney (3)	17,187	5–7	Rogers Centre	W2	−3 1/2
13	April 18	@ Blue Jays	3–1	Santana (1–2)	Romero (1–1)		14,246	6–7	Rogers Centre	W3	−2 1/2
14	April 19	Tigers	2–0	Piñeiro (2–1)	Willis (0–1)	Rodney (4)	36,006	7–7	Angel Stadium	W4	−2
15	April 20	Tigers	6–5	Kazmir (1–1)	Porcello (1–1)	Rodney (5)	35,266	8–7	Angel Stadium	W5	−1
16	April 21	Tigers	4–3	Coke (2–0)	Fuentes (0–1)	Valverde (4)	35,279	8–8	Angel Stadium	L1	−1
17	April 22	Tigers	5–4	Verlander (1–1)	Saunders (1–3)	Valverde (5)	37,338	8–9	Angel Stadium	L2	−2
18	April 23	Yankees	6–4	Rodney (2–0)	Chamberlain (0–1)	Fuentes (2)	44,002	9–9	Angel Stadium	W1	−2
19	April 24	Yankees	7–1	Pettitte (3–0)	Piñeiro (2–2)		43,390	9–10	Angel Stadium	L1	−2
20	April 25	Yankees	8–4	Kazmir (2–1)	Vázquez (1–3)		42,284	10–10	Angel Stadium	W1	−2
21	April 26	Indians	5–2	Weaver (3–0)	Huff (1–3)	Fuentes (3)	34,837	11–10	Angel Stadium	W2	−1 1/2
22	April 27	Indians	9–2	Talbot (3–1)	Saunders (1–4)		39,619	11–11	Angel Stadium	L1	−1 1/2
23	April 28	Indians	4–3	Fuentes (1–1)	Smith (0–1)		34,190	12–11	Angel Stadium	W1	−1/2
24	April 30	@ Tigers	10–6	Porcello (2–2)	Piñeiro (2–3)		31,725	12–12	Comerica Park	L1	0

May (14–15)

#	Date	Opponent	Score	Win	Loss	Save	Attendance	Record	Stadium	Box	GB
25	May 1	@ Tigers	3–2	Perry (1–1)	Shields (0–1)		31,042	12–13	Comerica Park	L2	−1
26	May 2	@ Tigers	5–1	Verlander (2–2)	Weaver (3–1)		25,603	12–14	Comerica Park	L3	−1 1/2
27	May 3	@ Red Sox	17–8	Buchholz (3–2)	Saunders (1–5)		37,404	12–15	Fenway Park	L4	−2 1/2
28	May 4	@ Red Sox	5–1	Lester (2–2)	Jepsen (0–1)		37,411	12–16	Fenway Park	L5	−2 1/2
29	May 5	@ Red Sox	3–1	Lackey (3–1)	Piñeiro (2–4)	Papelbon (8)	37,601	12–17	Fenway Park	L6	−3
30	May 6	@ Red Sox	11–6	Matsuzaka (1–1)	Kazmir (2–2)		37,639	12–18	Fenway Park	L7	−3 1/2
31	May 7	@ Mariners	8–0	Weaver (4–1)	Hernández (2–3)		37,602	13–18	Safeco Field	W1	−3 1/2
32	May 8	@ Mariners	4–3 (10)	Rodney (3–0)	Aardsma (0–2)	Fuentes (4)	30,446	14–18	Safeco Field	W2	−3 1/2
33	May 9	@ Mariners	8–1	Vargas (3–2)	Santana (1–3)		28,668	14–19	Safeco Field	L1	−4 1/2
34	May 10	Rays	5–4 (11)	Bell (1–0)	Balfour (0–1)		36,798	15–19	Angel Stadium	W1	−4
35	May 11	Rays	7–2	Niemann (3–0)	Kazmir (2–3)		39,007	15–20	Angel Stadium	L1	−4
36	May 12	Rays	4–3	Price (5–1)	Weaver (4–2)	Soriano (9)	35,700	15–21	Angel Stadium	L2	−5
37	May 14	Athletics	4–0	Saunders (2–5)	Braden (4–3)		41,290	16–21	Angel Stadium	W1	−4 1/2
38	May 15	Athletics	12–3	Santana (2–3)	Ross (1–1)		41,744	17–21	Angel Stadium	W2	−3 1/2
39	May 16	Athletics	4–0	Piñeiro (3–4)	Cahill (1–2)		41,569	18–21	Angel Stadium	W3	−2 1/2
40	May 17	@ Rangers	4–3	Holland (2–0)	Kazmir (2–4)	Feliz (10)	20,210	18–22	Rangers Ballpark in Arlington	L1	−3 1/2
41	May 18	@ Rangers	8–7	O'Day (1–1)	Bell (1–1)	Feliz (11)	22,358	18–23	Rangers Ballpark in Arlington	L2	−4 1/2
42	May 19	@ White Sox	3–2	Saunders (3–5)	Danks (3–3)	Fuentes (5)	23,271	19–23	U.S. Cellular Field	W1	−4 1/2
43	May 20	@ White Sox	6–5	Santana (3–3)	Peavy (3–3)	Fuentes (6)	23,515	20–23	U.S. Cellular Field	W2	−4 1/2
44	May 21	@ Cardinals	9–5	Motte (2–1)	Piñeiro (3–5)		44,111	20–24	Busch Stadium	L1	−5 1/2
45	May 22	@ Cardinals	10–7	Kazmir (3–4)	Lohse (1–4)		44,091	21–24	Busch Stadium	W1	−4 1/2
46	May 23	@ Cardinals	6–5	Franklin (3–0)	Shields (0–2)		42,417	21– 25	Busch Stadium	L1	−4 1/2
47	May 24	Blue Jays	6–0	Cecil (4–2)	Saunders (3–6)		35,826	21–26	Angel Stadium	L2	−5
48	May 25	Blue Jays	8–3	Santana (4–3)	Romero (4–2)		43,174	22–26	Angel Stadium	W1	−5
49	May 26	Blue Jays	6–5	Fuentes (2–1)	Downs (1–4)		34,504	23–26	Angel Stadium	W2	−4
50	May 28	Mariners	8–3	Lee (3–2)	Kazmir (3–5)		41,770	23–27	Angel Stadium	L1	−4
51	May 29	Mariners	5–1 (10)	Fuentes (3–1)	League (4–5)		39,382	24–27	Angel Stadium	W1	−3 1/2
52	May 30	Mariners	9–7	Rodney (4–0)	Aardsma (0–3)		40,017	25–27	Angel Stadium	W2	−2 1/2
53	May 31	@ Royals	7–1	Santana (5–3)	Hochevar (5–3)		24,651	26–27	Kauffman Stadium	W3	−2 1/2

June (18–8)

#	Date	Opponent	Score	Win	Loss	Save	Attendance	Record	Stadium	Box	GB
54	June 1	@ Royals	6–3	Bannister (5–3)	Piñeiro (3–6)	Soria (13)	15,139	26–28	Kauffman Stadium	L1	−2 1/2
55	June 2	@ Royals	7–2	Kazmir (4–5)	Davies (4–4)		12,718	27–28	Kauffman Stadium	W1	−2 1/2
56	June 3	@ Royals	5–4	Weaver (5–2)	Greinke (1–7)	Fuentes (7)	13,621	28–28	Kauffman Stadium	W2	−1 1/2
57	June 4	@ Mariners	7–1	Saunders (4–6)	Snell (0–4)		29,230	29–28	Safeco Field	W3	−1 1/2
58	June 5	@ Mariners	11–2	Santana (6–3)	Olson (0–1)		31,548	30–28	Safeco Field	W4	−1 1/2
59	June 6	@ Mariners	9–4	Piñeiro (4–6)	Kelley (3–1)		33,076	31–28	Safeco Field	W5	−1/2
60	June 7	@ Athletics	4–2	Kazmir (5–5)	Sheets (2–5)	Fuentes (8)	10,071	32–28	Oakland-Alameda Coliseum	W6	+1/2
61	June 8	@ Athletics	10–1	Mazzaro (2–0)	Weaver (5–3)		11,860	32–29	Oakland-Alameda Coliseum	L1	−1/2
62	June 9	@ Athletics	7–1	Saunders (5–6)	Braden (4–6)		18,285	33–29	Oakland-Alameda Coliseum	W1	−1/2
63	June 10	@ Athletics	6–1	Cahill (5–2)	Santana (6–4)		12,328	33–30	Oakland-Alameda Coliseum	L1	−1 1/2
64	June 11	@ Dodgers	10–1	Piñeiro (5–6)	Billingsley (6–4)		52,407	34–30	Dodger Stadium	W1	−1/2
65	June 12	@ Dodgers	4–2	Kazmir (6–5)	Ely (3–3)	Fuentes (9)	52,806	35–30	Dodger Stadium	W2	−1/2
66	June 13	@ Dodgers	6–5	Weaver (6–3)	Monasterios (3–1)	Fuentes (10)	52,776	36–30	Dodger Stadium	W3	−1/2
67	June 14	Brewers	12–2	Wolf (5–6)	Saunders (5–7)		39,289	36–31	Angel Stadium	L1	−1
68	June 15	Brewers	7–1	Bush (2–5)	Santana (6–5)		37,484	36–32	Angel Stadium	L2	−2
69	June 16	Brewers	5–1	Piñeiro (6–6)	Narveson (5–4)		37,416	37–32	Angel Stadium	W1	−2
70	June 18	@ Cubs	7–6	Kazmir (7–5)	Silva (8–2)	Rodney (6)	39,729	38–32	Wrigley Field	W2	−2 1/2
71	June 19	@ Cubs	12–0	Weaver (7–3)	Lilly (2–6)		40,008	39–32	Wrigley Field	W3	−2 1/2
72	June 20	@ Cubs	12–1	Zambrano (3–5)	Saunders (5–8)		39,850	39–33	Wrigley Field	L1	−3 1/2
73	June 22	Dodgers	6–3	Santana (7–5)	Kershaw (7–4)	Fuentes (11)	41,595	40–33	Angel Stadium	W1	−3 1/2
74	June 23	Dodgers	2–1	Piñeiro (7–6)	Ely (3–5)	Fuentes (12)	41,001	41–33	Angel Stadium	W2	−3 1/2
75	June 24	Dodgers	10–6	Jeff Weaver (4–1)	Kazmir (7–6)		44,043	41–34	Angel Stadium	L1	−4 1/2
76	June 25	Rockies	4–3 (11)	Belisle (3–3)	Rodríguez (0–1)		37,228	41–35	Angel Stadium	L2	−4 1/2
77	June 26	Rockies	4–2	Saunders (6–8)	Cook (2–5)	Fuentes (13)	39,225	42–35	Angel Stadium	W1	−4 1/2
78	June 27	Rockies	10–3	Santana (8–5)	Chacín (4–7)		37,314	43–35	Angel Stadium	W2	−4 1/2
79	June 29	Rangers	6–5	Piñeiro (8–6)	Feldman (5–7)	Fuentes (14)	38,514	44–35	Angel Stadium	W3	−3 1/2
80	June 30	Rangers	6–4	Nippert (3–3)	Kazmir (7–7)	Feliz (21)	41,867	44–36	Angel Stadium	L1	−4 1/2

July (9–17)

#	Date	Opponent	Score	Win	Loss	Save	Attendance	Record	Stadium	Box	GB
81	July 1	Rangers	2–1	Weaver (8–3)	Wilson (6–4)	Fuentes (15)	41,162	45–36	Angel Stadium	W1	−3 1/2
82	July 2	Royals	2–1	Tejeda (3–3)	Shields (0–3)	Soria (21)	40,005	45–37	Angel Stadium	L1	−3 1/2
83	July 3	Royals	4–2	Chen (5–2)	Santana (8–6)	Soria (22)	39,112	45–38	Angel Stadium	L2	−4 1/2
84	July 4	Royals	11–0	Piñeiro (9–6)	Larew (1–2)		42,116	46–38	Angel Stadium	W1	−3 1/2
85	July 5	@ White Sox	9–2	Floyd (4–7)	Kazmir (7–8)	Santos (1)	38,092	46–39	U.S. Cellular Field	L1	−3 1/2
86	July 6	@ White Sox	4–1	Peña (2–1)	Weaver (8–4)	Jenks (18)	21,889	46–40	U.S. Cellular Field	L2	−4 1/2
87	July 7	@ White Sox	5–2	García (9–3)	Saunders (6–9)	Jenks (19)	21,135	46–41	U.S. Cellular Field	L3	−5 1/2
88	July 8	@ White Sox	1–0	Danks (8–7)	Santana (8–7)		27,734	46–42	U.S. Cellular Field	L4	−5 1/2
89	July 9	@ Athletics	6–5 (10)	Jepsen (1–1)	Bailey (0–3)	Fuentes (16)	13,156	47–42	Oakland-Alameda Coliseum	W1	−4 1/2
90	July 10	@ Athletics	15–1	Sheets (4–8)	Kazmir (7–9)		30,035	47–43	Oakland-Alameda Coliseum	L1	−4 1/2
91	July 11	@ Athletics	5–2	Cahill (9–3)	Weaver (8–5)	Bailey (18)	15,164	47–44	Oakland-Alameda Coliseum	L2	−4 1/2
July 13: All-Star Game (NL wins—Box)			3–1	Capps (WAS)	Hughes (NYY)	Broxton (LAD)	45,408		Angel Stadium	Anaheim, CA	
92	July 15	Mariners	8–3	Piñeiro (10–6)	Fister (3–5)		41,959	48–44	Angel Stadium	W1	−4 1/2
93	July 16	Mariners	3–2	Weaver (9–5)	Hernández (7–6)	Fuentes (17)	41,449	49–44	Angel Stadium	W2	−4 1/2
94	July 17	Mariners	7–6	Jepsen (2–1)	Sweeney (1–1)	Fuentes (18)	42,997	50–44	Angel Stadium	W3	−3 1/2
95	July 18	Mariners	2–1 (10)	League (6–6)	Jepsen (2–2)	Aardsma (17)	38,883	50–45	Angel Stadium	L1	−4 1/2
96	July 20	@ Yankees	10–2	O'Sullivan (1–0)	Hughes (11–3)		47,775	51–45	Yankee Stadium	W1	−5
97	July 21	@ Yankees	10–6	Vázquez (8–7)	Piñeiro (10–7)		47,521	51–46	Yankee Stadium	L1	−5
98	July 22	@ Rangers	3–2	Lee (9–4)	Weaver (9–6)	Feliz (26)	39,876	51–47	Rangers Ballpark in Arlington	L2	−6
99	July 23	@ Rangers	1–0	Wilson (9–5)	Saunders (6–10)	Feliz (27)	46,554	51–48	Rangers Ballpark in Arlington	L3	−7
100	July 24	@ Rangers	6–2	Santana (9–7)	Feldman (5–9)		47,098	52–48	Rangers Ballpark in Arlington	W1	−6
101	July 25	@ Rangers	6–4	Hunter (8–0)	Bell (1–2)	Feliz (28)	38,320	52–49	Rangers Ballpark in Arlington	L1	−7
102	July 26	Red Sox	6–3	Buchholz (11–5)	Haren (7–9)	Papelbon (23)	40,364	52–50	Angel Stadium	L2	−7 1/2
103	July 27	Red Sox	4–2	Lackey (10–5)	Weaver (9–7)	Papelbon (24)	40,120	52–51	Angel Stadium	L3	−8 1/2
104	July 28	Red Sox	7–3	Beckett (2–1)	Rodney (4–1)		44,052	52–52	Angel Stadium	L4	−8 1/2
105	July 30	Rangers	9–7	Santana (10–7)	Hunter (8–1)	Fuentes (19)	43,024	53–52	Angel Stadium	W1	−8
106	July 31	Rangers	2–1	Harden (4–3)	Haren (7–10)	Feliz (29)	41,011	53–53	Angel Stadium	L1	−9

August (11–16)

#	Date	Opponent	Score	Win	Loss	Save	Attendance	Record	Stadium	Box	GB
107	August 1	Rangers	4–1	Weaver (10–7)	Lee (9–5)	Fuentes (20)	41,019	54–53	Angel Stadium	W1	−8
108	August 3	@ Orioles	6–3	Guthrie (5–11)	Rodríguez (0–2)		16,723	54–54	Oriole Park at Camden Yards	L1	−8
109	August 4	@ Orioles	9–7	Matusz (4–11)	Santana (10–8)	Simón (16)	13,467	54–55	Oriole Park at Camden Yards	L2	−9
110	August 5	@ Orioles	5–4	Berken (3–2)	Rodríguez (0–3)		17,362	54–56	Oriole Park at Camden Yards	L3	−10
111	August 6	@ Tigers	4–2	Weaver (11–7)	Verlander (12–7)	Fuentes (21)	35,106	55–56	Comerica Park	W1	−10
112	August 7	@ Tigers	10–1	Kazmir (8–9)	Bonderman (6–7)		38,783	56–56	Comerica Park	W2	−9
113	August 8	@ Tigers	9–4	Porcello (5–10)	Bell (1–3)		32,037	56–57	Comerica Park	L1	−9
114	August 9	Royals	6–4	Santana (11–8)	O'Sullivan (1–3)	Fuentes (22)	40,011	57–57	Angel Stadium	W1	−8 1/2
115	August 10	Royals	3–1	Haren (8–10)	Bullington (0–2)	Fuentes (23)	43,512	58–57	Angel Stadium	W2	−8 1/2
116	August 11	Royals	2–1 (10)	Fuentes (4–1)	Chavez (4–3)		39,093	59–57	Angel Stadium	W3	−7 1/2
117	August 13	Blue Jays	3–0	Rzepczynski (1–1)	Kazmir (8–10)	Gregg (26)	40,606	59–58	Angel Stadium	L1	−8 1/2
118	August 14	Blue Jays	7–2	Santana (12–8)	Cecil (9–6)		42,059	60–58	Angel Stadium	W1	−7 1/2
119	August 15	Blue Jays	4–1	Romero (10–7)	Haren (8–11)	Gregg (27)	38,138	60–59	Angel Stadium	L1	−8 1/2
120	August 17	@ Red Sox	6–0	Buchholz (14–5)	Weaver (11–8)		38,304	60–60	Fenway Park	L2	−8
121	August 18	@ Red Sox	7–5	Lackey (11–7)	Jepsen (2–3)	Papelbon (30)	37,779	60–61	Fenway Park	L3	−8
122	August 19	@ Red Sox	7–2	Santana (13–8)	Beckett (3–3)		37,641	61–61	Fenway Park	W1	−7
123	August 20	@ Twins	7–2	Duensing (7–1)	Haren (8–12)		40,747	61–62	Target Field	L1	−8
124	August 21	@ Twins	9–3	Rodríguez (1–3)	Slowey (11–6)		40,966	62–62	Target Field	W1	−7
125	August 22	@ Twins	4–0	Baker (11–9)	Weaver (11–9)		40,385	62–63	Target Field	L1	−8
126	August 23	Rays	4–3	Shields (12–11)	Kazmir (8–11)	Soriano (38)	39,127	62–64	Angel Stadium	L2	−9
127	August 24	Rays	10–3	Davis (–)	Santana (13–9)		43,577	62–65	Angel Stadium	L3	−10
128	August 25	Rays	12–3	Haren (9–12)	Niemann (10–4)		37,099	63–65	Angel Stadium	W1	−10
129	August 27	Orioles	3–1	Bergesen (6–9)	Bell (1–4)	Uehara (3)	41,037	63–66	Angel Stadium	L1	−10 1/2
130	August 28	Orioles	5–0	Millwood (3–14)	Kazmir (8–12)		43,127	63–67	Angel Stadium	L2	−10 1/2
131	August 29	Orioles	1–0	Guthrie (8–13)	Weaver (11–10)	Uehara (4)	38,232	63–68	Angel Stadium	L3	−10 1/2
132	August 30	@ Mariners	5–3	Santana (14–9)	Hernández (2–6)	Rodney (7)	20,545	64–68	Safeco Field	W1	−10 1/2
133	August 31	@ Mariners	3–1	League (9–6)	Jepsen (2–4)	Aardsma (26)	18,737	64–69	Safeco Field	L1	−10 1/2

September (14–12)

#	Date	Opponent	Score	Win	Loss	Save	Attendance	Record	Stadium	Box	GB
134	September 1	@ Mariners	4–2	Bell (2–4)	Vargas (9–8)	Rodney (8)	17,515	65–69	Safeco Field	W1	−10 1/2
135	September 3	@ Athletics	8–0	Gonzalez (13–8)	Kazmir (8–13)		23,401	65–70	Oakland-Alameda Coliseum	L1	−10 1/2
136	September 4	@ Athletics	3–1	Cahill (15–6)	Weaver (11–11)	Bailey (21)	14,227	65–71	Oakland-Alameda Coliseum	L2	−10 1/2
137	September 5	@ Athletics	7–4	Santana (15–9)	Mazzaro (6–8)		16,413	66–71	Oakland-Alameda Coliseum	W1	−9 1/2
138	September 6	Indians	3–2	Rodney (4–2)	Lewis (4–2)	Perez (19)	39,107	66–72	Angel Stadium	L1	−9 1/2
139	September 7	Indians	6–1	Masterson (6–2)	Bell (2–5)		38,619	66–73	Angel Stadium	L2	−9 1/2
140	September 8	Indians	4–3 (16)	Palmer (1–1)	Ambriz (0–2)		37,857	67–73	Angel Stadium	W1	−9 1/2
141	September 10	Mariners	4–3 (14)	Thompson (1–0)	Sweeney (1–2)		42,203	68–73	Angel Stadium	W2	−10
142	September 11	Mariners	7–4	Santana (16–9)	Hernández (11–11)	Rodney (9)	39,123	69–73	Angel Stadium	W3	−10
143	September 12	Mariners	3–0	Haren (10–12)	Vargas (9–10)	Rodney (10)	42,357	70–73	Angel Stadium	W4	−10
144	September 14	@ Indians	4–3	Tomlin (4–3)	Kazmir (8–14)	Perez (20)	15,734	70–74	Progressive Field	L1	−11
145	September 15	@ Indians	7–0	Weaver (12–11)	Gómez (3–4)		10,183	71–74	Progressive Field	W1	−11
146	September 16	@ Indians	3–2 (11)	Pérez (5–1)	Cassevah (0–1)		14,000	71–75	Progressive Field	L1	−11 1/2
147	September 17	@ Rays	4–3	Kohn (1–0)	Wheeler (2–4)	Rodney (11)	23,215	72–75	Tropicana Field	W1	−10 1/2
148	September 18	@ Rays	4–3 (10)	Soriano (3–2)	Cassevah (0–2)		31,896	72–76	Tropicana Field	L1	−11 1/2
149	September 19	@ Rays	6–3	Kazmir (9–14)	Niemann (10–7)	Walden (1)	25,794	73–76	Tropicana Field	W1	−10 1/2
150	September 20	Rangers	7–4	Weaver (13–11)	Holland (3–4)	Rodney (12)	41,404	74–76	Angel Stadium	W2	−9 1/2
151	September 21	Rangers	2–0	Santana (17–9)	Lewis (12–12)		41,707	75–76	Angel Stadium	W3	−8 1/2
152	September 22	Rangers	2–1 (12)	Harrison (3–1)	Palmer (1–2)	Feliz (37)	41,222	75–77	Angel Stadium	L1	−9 1/2
153	September 24	White Sox	2–1	Thornton (5–4)	Rodney (4–3)		41,046	75–78	Angel Stadium	L2	−10
154	September 25	White Sox	6–2	Danks (14–11)	Kazmir (9–15)		40,758	75–79	Angel Stadium	L3	−11
155	September 26	White Sox	4–3	Peña (5–2)	Weaver (13–12)	Thornton (7)	42,686	75–80	Angel Stadium	L4	−12
156	September 27	Athletics	6–5	Kohn (2–0)	Ziegler (3–6)	Rodney (13)	40,414	76–80	Angel Stadium	W1	−11
157	September 28	Athletics	4–2	Haren (11–12)	Braden (10–14)	Rodney (14)	43,163	77–80	Angel Stadium	W2	−10
158	September 29	Athletics	2–1 (11)	Cassevah (1–2)	Ziegler (3–7)		39,199	78–80	Angel Stadium	W3	−10
159	September 30	@ Rangers	3–2	O'Day (6–2)	Walden (0–1)	Feliz (39)	33,228	78–81	Rangers Ballpark in Arlington	W3	−11

October (2–1)

#	Date	Opponent	Score	Win	Loss	Save	Attendance	Record	Stadium	Box	GB
160	October 1	@ Rangers	5–4 (11)	Thompson (2–0)	Harrison (3–2)	Kohn (1)	43,149	79–81	Rangers Ballpark in Arlington	W1	−10
161	October 2	@ Rangers	6–2	Wilson (15–8)	Santana (17–10)	Feliz (40)	45,895	79–82	Rangers Ballpark in Arlington	L1	−11
162	October 3	@ Rangers	6–2	Haren (12–12)	Nippert (4–5)		45,446	80–82	Rangers Ballpark in Arlington	W1	−10

Final games legend
Angels Win	Angels Loss	All-Star Game	Game postponed	Eliminated

"GB" legend
1st (AL West)	Not in Playoff Position	1st (AL Wild Card)	Tied for 1st (AL West)

Regular Season Schedule (calendar style)
Regular Season Schedule (sortable text)

=== Record vs. opponents ===
2010 American League record Source: MLB Standings Grid – 2010
Team	BAL	BOS	CWS	CLE	DET	KC	LAA	MIN	NYY	OAK	SEA	TB	TEX	TOR	NL
Baltimore	–	9–9	4–3	3–3	5–5	2–4	6–0	3–5	5–13	3–7	3–6	7–11	6–4	3–15	7–11
Boston	9–9	–	1–6	4–4	3–3	4–3	9–1	3–2	9–9	4–5	7–3	7–11	4–6	12–6	13–5
Chicago	3–4	6–1	–	9–9	8–10	10–8	7–2	5–13	2–4	4–5	9–1	3–4	4–5	3–5	15–3
Cleveland	3–3	4–4	9–9	–	9–9	10–8	5–4	6–12	2–6	3–6	3–4	2–7	2–4	6–4	5–13
Detroit	5–5	3–3	10–8	9–9	–	10–8	6–4	9–9	4–4	3–3	3–5	1–6	3–6	4–4	11–7
Kansas City	4–2	3-4	9–10	8–10	8–10	–	3-7	5–13	3–5	3–6	5–4	4–4	2–7	3–3	8–10
Los Angeles	0–6	1–9	2–7	4–5	4–6	7–3	–	2–5	4–4	11–8	15–4	4–5	9–10	6–3	11–7
Minnesota	5–3	2–3	13–5	12–6	9–9	13–5	5–2	–	2–4	6–3	6-4	3–5	7–3	3–6	8–10
New York	13–5	9–9	4–2	6-2	4–4	5–3	4–4	4–2	–	9–1	6–4	8–10	4–4	8–10	11–7
Oakland	7–3	5–4	5–4	6–3	3–3	6–3	8–11	3–6	1–9	–	13–6	4–5	9–10	3–4	8–10
Seattle	6–3	3–7	1–9	4–3	5–3	4–5	4–15	4–6	4–6	6–13	–	2–7	7–12	2–3	9–9
Tampa Bay	11–7	11–7	4–3	7–2	6–1	4–4	5–4	5–3	10–8	5–4	7–2	–	4–2	10–8	7–11
Texas	4–6	6–4	5–4	4–2	6–3	7–2	10-9	3-7	4-4	10-9	12–7	2–4	–	3–7	14–4
Toronto	15–3	6–12	5–3	4–6	4–4	3–3	3–6	6–3	10–8	4–3	3–2	8–10	7–3	–	7–11

- Source: MLB Standings Grid – 2010

=== Roster ===
2010 Los Angeles Angels
Roster
Pitchers: 70 Trevor Bell; 52 Jason Bulger; 38 Bobby Cassevah; 40 Brian Fuentes; 24 Dan Haren; 65 Kevin Jepsen; 19 Scott Kazmir; 58 Michael Kohn; 37 Sean O'Sullivan; 32 Matt Palmer; 35 Joel Piñeiro; 56 Fernando Rodney; 45 Francisco Rodríguez; 59 Rafael Rodríguez; 54 Ervin Santana; 51 Joe Saunders; 62 Scot Shields; 43 Brian Stokes; 63 Rich Thompson; 51 Jordan Walden; 36 Jered Weaver	Catchers: 28 Ryan Budde; 64 Hank Conger; 5,10 Jeff Mathis; 46 Bobby Wilson; Infielders: 2 Erick Aybar; 12 Alberto Callaspo; 18 Kevin Frandsen; 13,6 Maicer Izturis; 47 Howard Kendrick; 41 Paul McAnulty; 8 Kendry Morales; 44 Mike Napoli; 39 Robb Quinlan; 73 Andrew Romine; 37 Mark Trumbo; 3 Brandon Wood; Outfielders: 53 Bobby Abreu; 22 Cory Aldridge; 25 Peter Bourjos; 17 Terry Evans; 48 Torii Hunter; 55 Hideki Matsui; 20 Juan Rivera; 27 Mike Ryan; 77 Reggie Willits	Manager: 14 Mike Scioscia; Coaches: 23 Mike Butcher (pitching); 21 Dino Ebel (third base); 4 Alfredo Griffin (first base); 7 Mickey Hatcher (hitting); 88 Orlando Mercado (bullpen); 10 Ron Roenicke (bench)

== Player stats ==
=== Batting ===
Note: G = Games played; AB = At bats; R = Runs; H = Hits; 2B = Doubles; 3B = Triples; HR = Home runs; RBI = Runs batted in; SB = Stolen bases; BB = Walks; AVG = Batting average; SLG = Slugging average

Player	G	AB	R	H	2B	3B	HR	RBI	SB	BB	AVG	SLG
Howie Kendrick	158	616	67	172	41	4	10	75	14	28	.279	.407
Bobby Abreu	154	573	88	146	41	1	20	78	24	87	.255	.435
Torii Hunter	152	573	76	161	36	0	23	90	9	61	.281	.464
Hideki Matsui	145	482	55	132	24	1	21	84	0	67	.274	.459
Mike Napoli	140	453	60	108	24	1	26	68	4	42	.238	.468
Erick Aybar	138	534	69	135	18	4	5	29	22	35	.253	.330
Juan Rivera	124	416	53	105	20	0	15	52	2	33	.252	.409
Brandon Wood	81	226	20	33	2	0	4	14	1	6	.146	.208
Alberto Callaspo	58	213	21	53	8	0	2	13	2	12	.249	.315
Maicer Izturis	61	212	27	53	13	1	3	27	7	21	.250	.363
Jeff Mathis	68	205	19	40	6	1	3	18	3	6	.195	.278
Kendrys Morales	51	193	29	56	5	0	11	39	0	12	.290	.487
Peter Bourjos	51	181	19	37	6	4	6	15	10	6	.204	.381
Kevin Frandsen	54	160	24	40	11	0	0	14	2	9	.250	.319
Reggie Willits	97	159	23	41	7	0	0	8	2	19	.258	.302
Bobby Wilson	40	96	12	22	6	0	4	15	0	8	.229	.417
Michael Ryan	22	39	3	8	4	0	0	2	0	1	.205	.308
Robb Quinlan	23	33	4	4	2	0	0	2	2	2	.121	.182
Hank Conger	13	29	2	5	1	1	0	5	0	5	.172	.276
Paul McAnulty	9	22	2	3	0	0	1	2	0	2	.136	.273
Mark Trumbo	8	15	2	1	0	0	0	2	0	1	.067	.067
Cory Aldridge	5	13	0	1	0	1	0	1	0	0	.077	.231
Andrew Romine	5	11	0	1	0	0	0	0	0	0	.091	.091
Ryan Budde	6	10	2	4	1	0	1	3	0	1	.400	.800
Terry Evans	1	1	0	0	0	0	0	0	0	0	.000	.000
Pitcher totals	162	23	4	2	0	0	0	0	0	2	.087	.087
Team totals	162	5488	681	1363	276	19	155	656	104	466	.248	.390

=== Pitching ===
Note: W = Wins; L = Losses; ERA = Earned run average; G = Games pitched; GS = Games started; SV = Saves; IP = Innings pitched; H = Hits allowed; R = Runs allowed; ER = Earned runs allowed; BB = Walks allowed; SO = Strikeouts

Player	W	L	ERA	G	GS	SV	IP	H	R	ER	BB	SO
Jered Weaver	13	12	3.01	34	34	0	224.1	187	83	75	54	233
Ervin Santana	17	10	3.92	33	33	0	222.2	221	104	97	73	169
Joel Piñeiro	10	7	3.84	23	23	0	152.1	155	66	65	34	92
Scott Kazmir	9	15	5.94	28	28	0	150.0	158	103	99	79	93
Joe Saunders	6	10	4.62	20	20	0	120.2	135	70	62	45	64
Dan Haren	5	4	2.87	14	14	0	94.0	84	31	30	25	75
Fernando Rodney	4	3	4.24	72	0	14	68.0	70	33	32	35	53
Trevor Bell	2	5	4.72	25	7	0	61.0	77	35	32	21	45
Kevin Jepsen	2	4	3.97	68	0	0	59.0	54	26	26	29	61
Francisco Rodríguez	1	3	4.37	43	0	0	47.1	46	23	23	26	36
Scot Shields	0	3	5.28	43	1	0	46.0	45	31	27	34	39
Brian Fuentes	4	1	3.52	39	0	23	38.1	28	17	15	18	39
Matt Palmer	1	2	4.54	14	1	0	33.2	38	20	17	20	17
Jason Bulger	0	0	4.88	25	0	0	24.0	25	14	13	15	25
Michael Kohn	2	0	2.11	24	0	1	21.1	17	5	5	16	20
Bobby Cassevah	1	2	3.15	16	0	0	16.2	26	18	15	16	16
Rich Thompson	2	0	1.37	13	0	0	19.2	12	4	3	4	15
Brian Stokes	0	0	8.10	16	0	0	16.2	26	18	15	16	16
Jordan Walden	0	1	2.35	16	0	1	15.1	13	4	4	7	23
Sean O'Sullivan	1	0	2.08	5	1	0	13.0	7	3	3	4	6
Rafael Rodríguez	0	0	4.50	1	0	0	2.0	1	1	1	2	1
Team totals	80	82	4.04	162	162	39	1449.1	1422	702	651	565	1130

== All-Star Game ==
The MLB All-Star game was hosted by the Angels in 2010, for the third time in franchise history (having previously hosted in 1967 and 1989, both in different stadium configurations). The game was an exhibition between the All Stars of the American League managed by Joe Girardi, who led the 2009 World Series champion New York Yankees, and Charlie Manuel, who managed the 2009 National League champion Philadelphia Phillies. The National League won the game, which gave the San Francisco Giants home-field advantage for the 2010 World Series.

== Farm system ==
Level	Team	League	Manager
AAA	Salt Lake Bees	Pacific Coast League	Bobby Mitchell
AA	Arkansas Travelers	Texas League	Bobby Magallanes
A	Rancho Cucamonga Quakes	California League	Keith Johnson
A	Cedar Rapids Kernels	Midwest League	Bill Mosiello
Rookie	AZL Angels	Arizona League	Tyrone Boykin
Rookie	Orem Owlz	Pioneer League	Tom Kotchman

== See also ==
- Los Angeles Angels
- 2010 MLB All-Star Game
- Angel Stadium

=== Other Anaheim–based teams in 2010 ===
- Anaheim Ducks (Honda Center)
  - 2009–10 Anaheim Ducks season
  - 2010–11 Anaheim Ducks season

Records
Preceded by 2009	Los Angeles Angels seasons 2010	Succeeded by 2011
