= 2010 Cleveland Indians season =

2010 Cleveland Indians
- League: American League
- Division: Central
- Ballpark: Progressive Field
- City: Cleveland, Ohio
- Record: 69–93 (.426)
- Divisional place: 4th
- Owners: Larry Dolan
- General managers: Mark Shapiro
- Managers: Manny Acta
- Television: SportsTime Ohio · WKYC (Matt Underwood, Rick Manning)
- Radio: WTAM · WMMS; Cleveland Indians Radio Network (Tom Hamilton, Jim Rosenhaus, Mike Hegan)

The 2010 Cleveland Indians season marked the 110th season for the franchise, with the Indians attempting to improve on their fourth-place finish in the American League Central in 2009. The team played all of its home games at Progressive Field. In addition, this was the second season for the Indians playing their spring training games in Goodyear, Arizona. Manny Acta took over as the manager in 2010, after the Indians fired Eric Wedge at the end of his seventh season managing the Indians. Acta was formerly the manager of the Washington Nationals. Fausto Carmona represented the team at the 2010 Major League Baseball All-Star Game.

== Regular season ==
=== Galarraga game ===
On June 2, Detroit's Armando Galarraga squared off against Roberto Hernandez. Neither pitcher would walk a batter that night. In the bottom of the 2nd inning, Miguel Cabrera homered giving the Tigers a 1–0 lead. Until the bottom of the 8th, that would be the game's only run. With 2 outs, Magglio Ordonez drove in Austin Jackson, making it 2-0 and a throwing error by Shin-Soo Choo allowed Johnny Damon to follow, making it 3–0. Galarraga retired the first 26 Indians. In the top of the 9th, Jackson preserved the bid for perfection with a stellar over-the-shoulder catch off the bat of Mark Grudzielanek. With 2 outs, Jason Donald hit a soft groundball to the right side of the infield. The play at first base was very close, but the 1st base umpire Jim Joyce ruled Donald safe. However, the replay showed that Donald was out by a step. Donald would steal 2nd and 3rd on defensive indifference. Despite the infamous call, Trevor Crowe grounded out for the final out of the game.

=== Trade deadline moves ===
For the third consecutive year, the Indians were significant participants in trade deadline moves. Jhonny Peralta went first, three days before the deadline. Austin Kearns went the night before, while pitchers Jake Westbrook and Kerry Wood were shipped in two separate trades hours before the July 31 deadline.

On July 28, Peralta and cash were sent to the Detroit Tigers for Class A left-handed pitcher Giovanni Soto. Luis Valbuena was recalled from Triple-A Columbus to take Peralta's roster spot.

On July 30, Kearns was sent to the New York Yankees for a player to be named later.

On July 31, Westbrook was part of a three-team trade involving the Indians, St. Louis Cardinals, and San Diego Padres. He went to the Cardinals, while the Indians received Class AA right-handed pitcher Corey Kluber from San Diego. Later in the day, the Tribe sent Wood and cash to the New York Yankees for a player to be named or cash.

=== Season standings ===
==== American League Central ====
AL Central
Team	W	L	Pct.	GB	Home	Road
Minnesota Twins	94	68	.580	—	53‍–‍28	41‍–‍40
Chicago White Sox	88	74	.543	6	45‍–‍36	43‍–‍38
Detroit Tigers	81	81	.500	13	52‍–‍29	29‍–‍52
Cleveland Indians	69	93	.426	25	38‍–‍43	31‍–‍50
Kansas City Royals	67	95	.414	27	38‍–‍43	29‍–‍52

==== American League Wild Card ====
Division winners
Team	W	L	Pct.
Tampa Bay Rays	96	66	.593
Minnesota Twins	94	68	.580
Texas Rangers	90	72	.556

Wild Card team (Top team qualifies for postseason)
Team	W	L	Pct.	GB
New York Yankees	95	67	.586	—
Boston Red Sox	89	73	.549	6
Chicago White Sox	88	74	.543	7
Toronto Blue Jays	85	77	.525	10
Detroit Tigers	81	81	.500	14
Oakland Athletics	81	81	.500	14
Los Angeles Angels of Anaheim	80	82	.494	15
Cleveland Indians	69	93	.426	26
Kansas City Royals	67	95	.414	28
Baltimore Orioles	66	96	.407	29
Seattle Mariners	61	101	.377	34

==== Record vs. opponents ====
2010 American League record Source: MLB Standings Grid – 2010
Team	BAL	BOS	CWS	CLE	DET	KC	LAA	MIN	NYY	OAK	SEA	TB	TEX	TOR	NL
Baltimore	–	9–9	4–3	3–3	5–5	2–4	6–0	3–5	5–13	3–7	3–6	7–11	6–4	3–15	7–11
Boston	9–9	–	1–6	4–4	3–3	4–3	9–1	3–2	9–9	4–5	7–3	7–11	4–6	12–6	13–5
Chicago	3–4	6–1	–	9–9	8–10	10–8	7–2	5–13	2–4	4–5	9–1	3–4	4–5	3–5	15–3
Cleveland	3–3	4–4	9–9	–	9–9	10–8	5–4	6–12	2–6	3–6	3–4	2–7	2–4	6–4	5–13
Detroit	5–5	3–3	10–8	9–9	–	10–8	6–4	9–9	4–4	3–3	3–5	1–6	3–6	4–4	11–7
Kansas City	4–2	3-4	9–10	8–10	8–10	–	3-7	5–13	3–5	3–6	5–4	4–4	2–7	3–3	8–10
Los Angeles	0–6	1–9	2–7	4–5	4–6	7–3	–	2–5	4–4	11–8	15–4	4–5	9–10	6–3	11–7
Minnesota	5–3	2–3	13–5	12–6	9–9	13–5	5–2	–	2–4	6–3	6-4	3–5	7–3	3–6	8–10
New York	13–5	9–9	4–2	6-2	4–4	5–3	4–4	4–2	–	9–1	6–4	8–10	4–4	8–10	11–7
Oakland	7–3	5–4	5–4	6–3	3–3	6–3	8–11	3–6	1–9	–	13–6	4–5	9–10	3–4	8–10
Seattle	6–3	3–7	1–9	4–3	5–3	4–5	4–15	4–6	4–6	6–13	–	2–7	7–12	2–3	9–9
Tampa Bay	11–7	11–7	4–3	7–2	6–1	4–4	5–4	5–3	10–8	5–4	7–2	–	4–2	10–8	7–11
Texas	4–6	6–4	5–4	4–2	6–3	7–2	10-9	3-7	4-4	10-9	12–7	2–4	–	3–7	14–4
Toronto	15–3	6–12	5–3	4–6	4–4	3–3	3–6	6–3	10–8	4–3	3–2	8–10	7–3	–	7–11

- Source: MLB Standings Grid – 2010

=== Roster ===
2010 Cleveland Indians
Roster
Pitchers: 57 Héctor Ambriz; 55 Fausto Carmona; 59 Carlos Carrasco; 39 Justin Germano; 58 Jeanmar Gómez; 56 Frank Herrmann; 28 David Huff; 32 Aaron Laffey; 50 Jensen Lewis; 63 Justin Masterson; 54 Chris Perez; 53 Rafael Pérez; 52 Vinnie Pestano; 46 Tony Sipp; 38 Joe Smith; 51 Mitch Talbot; 40 Jess Todd; 43 Josh Tomlin; 37 Jake Westbrook; 34 Kerry Wood; 31 Jamey Wright	Catchers: 26 Luke Carlin; 8 Chris Gimenez; 30 Lou Marson; 52 Mike Redmond; 41 Carlos Santana; Infielders: 33 Russell Branyan; 35 Jordan Brown; 13 Asdrúbal Cabrera; 16 Jason Donald; 12 Mark Grudzielanek; 20 Anderson Hernández; 7 Matt LaPorta; 25 Andy Marte; 12 Jayson Nix; 2 Jhonny Peralta; 33 Drew Sutton; 1 Luis Valbuena; Outfielders: 23 Michael Brantley; 17 Shin-Soo Choo; 4 Trevor Crowe; 47 Shelley Duncan; 26 Austin Kearns; 24 Grady Sizemore; Other batters: 48 Travis Hafner	Manager: 11 Manny Acta; Coaches: 15 Sandy Alomar Jr. (first base); 49 Tim Belcher (pitching); 62 Ruben Niebla (ast. coach); 44 Jon Nunnally (hitting); 36 Scott Radinsky (bullpen); 10 Steve Smith (third base); 29 Tim Tolman (bench); 60 David Wallace (coach)

== Game log ==
2010 Game Log
April: 9–13

#	Date	Opponent	Score	Win	Loss	Save	Attendance	Record
1	April 5	@ White Sox	6–0	Buehrle (1–0)	Westbrook (0–1)		38,935	0–1
2	April 7	@ White Sox	5–3	Carmona (1–0)	Williams (0–1)	Perez (1)	19,514	1–1
3	April 8	@ White Sox	5–3 (11)	Lewis (1–0)	Putz (0–1)	Perez (2)	18,637	2–1
4	April 9	@ Tigers	5–2	Porcello (1–0)	Huff (0–1)	Valverde (1)	45,010	2–2
5	April 10	@ Tigers	4–2	Bonderman (1–0)	Talbot (0–1)	Perry (1)	35,332	2–3
6	April 11	@ Tigers	9–8	Coke (1–0)	Perez (0–1)		26,081	2–4
7	April 12	Rangers	4–2 (10)	Francisco (2–2)	Wright (0–1)	Feliz (1)	42,061	2–5
8	April 14	Rangers	6–2	Lewis (2–0)	Masterson (0–1)	Feliz (2)	10,071	2–6
9	April 15	Rangers	3–2	Huff (1–1)	Harrison (0–1)		10,198	3–6
10	April 16	White Sox	6–2	Talbot (1–1)	Buehrle (2–1)		10,421	4–6
11	April 17	White Sox	3–2	Lewis (2–0)	Thornton (1–1)	Perez (3)	12,885	5–6
12	April 18	White Sox	7–4	Carmona (2–0)	Floyd (0–2)	Perez (4)	10,564	6–6
13	April 20	@ Twins	5–1	Slowey (2–1)	Masterson (0–2)		38,985	6–7
14	April 21	@ Twins	6–0	Liriano (2–0)	Huff (1–2)		39,044	6–8
15	April 22	@ Twins	8–1	Talbot (2–1)	Baker (2–2)		38,810	7–8
16	April 23	@ Athletics	10–0	Duchscherer (2–0)	Westbrook (0–2)		11,547	7–9
17	April 24	@ Athletics	6–1	Carmona (3–0)	Gaudin (0–2)		15,873	8–9
18	April 25	@ Athletics	11–0	Gonzalez (2–1)	Masterson (0–3)		16,946	8–10
19	April 26	@ Angels	5–2	Weaver (3–0)	Huff (1–3)	Fuentes (3)	34,837	8–11
20	April 27	@ Angels	9–2	Talbot (3–1)	Saunders (1–4)		39,619	9–11
21	April 28	@ Angels	4–3	Fuentes (1–1)	Smith (0–1)		34,190	9–12
22	April 30	Twins	9–3	Slowey (3–2)	Carmona (3–1)		14,124	9–13

May: 9–18

#	Date	Opponent	Score	Win	Loss	Save	Attendance	Record
23	May 1	Twins	5–4 (11)	Wright (1–1)	Burnett (0–1)		13,832	10–13
24	May 2	Twins	8–3	Liriano (4–0)	Huff (1–4)		12,619	10–14
25	May 3	Blue Jays	5–1	Cecil (2–1)	Talbot (3–2)		10,117	10–15
26	May 4	Blue Jays	8–5	Romero (3–1)	Lewis (2–1)	Gregg (7)	10,387	10–16
27	May 5	Blue Jays	5–4	Frasor (1–1)	Perez (0–2)		12,563	10–17
N/A	May 7	Tigers	Postponed (rain)					
28	May 8	Tigers	6–4	Verlander (3–2)	Wood (0–1)	Valverde (8)	18,428	10–18
29	May 9	Tigers	7–4	Talbot (4–2)	Scherzer (1–3)	Pérez (5)	16,980	11–18
30	May 11	@ Royals	8–2	Westbrook (1–2)	Bannister (1–3)		15,930	12–18
31	May 12	@ Royals	4–0	Carmona (4–1)	Davies (2–2)		11,803	13–18
32	May 13	@ Royals	6–4	Greinke (1–4)	Huff (1–5)	Soria (8)	28,361	13–19
33	May 14	@ Orioles	8–1	Guthrie (2–4)	Masterson (0–4)		25,902	13–20
34	May 15	@ Orioles	8–2	Talbot (5–2)	Simón (0–1)		29,545	14–20
35	May 16	@ Orioles	5–1	Westbrook (2–2)	Hendrickson (1–1)		29,323	15–20
36	May 17	@ Rays	4–3	Sonnanstine (1–0)	Wright (1–2)		18,879	15–21
37	May 18	@ Rays	6–2	Price (6–1)	Huff (1–6)		17,093	15–22
38	May 19	Royals	8–4	Chen (1–0)	Wood (0–2)		10,916	15–23
39	May 20	Royals	9–3	Hochevar (4–2)	Talbot (5–3)		13,953	15–24
40	May 21	Reds	7–4	Arroyo (4–2)	Laffey (0–1)	Cordero (14)	23,028	15–25
41	May 22	Reds	6–4	Cueto (4–1)	Carmona (4–2)		25,531	15–26
42	May 23	Reds	4–3	Huff (4–2)	Herrera (0–2)	Wood (1)	21,044	16–26
43	May 24	White Sox	7–2	Danks (4–3)	Masterson (0–5)		10,166	16–27
44	May 25	White Sox	7–3	Talbot (6–3)	Peavy (3–4)		14,441	17–27
45	May 26	White Sox	5–4	Peña (1–1)	Westbrook (2–3)		18,109	17–28
46	May 28	@ Yankees	8–2	Hughes (6–1)	Carmona (4–3)		44,634	17–29
47	May 29	@ Yankees	13–11	Pérez (1–0)	Chamberlain (1–3)	Wood (2)	46,599	18–29
48	May 30	@ Yankees	7–3	Burnett (6–2)	Sipp (0–1)		45,706	18–30
49	May 31	@ Yankees	11–2	Pettitte (7–1)	Talbot (6–4)		44,976	18–31

June: 12–16

#	Date	Opponent	Score	Win	Loss	Save	Attendance	Record
50	June 1	@ Tigers	3–2	Westbrook (3–3)	Bonderman (2–3)	Wood (3)	19,446	19–31
51	June 2	@ Tigers	3–0	Galarraga (2–1)	Carmona (4–4)		17,738	19–32
52	June 3	@ Tigers	12–6	Thomas (2–0)	Ambriz (0–1)		28,169	19–33
53	June 4	@ White Sox	10–1	Masterson (1–5)	Danks (4–5)		20,713	20–33
54	June 5	@ White Sox	3–1	Talbot (7–4)	Peavy (4–5)	Wood (4)	30,864	21–33
55	June 6	@ White Sox	8–7	Putz (1–2)	Sipp (0–2)	Jenks (9)	27,577	21–34
56	June 7	Red Sox	4–1	Matsuzaka (5–2)	Carmona (4–5)		14,758	21–35
57	June 8	Red Sox	3–2	Wakefield (2–4)	Huff (2–7)	Bard (2)	15,462	21–36
58	June 9	Red Sox	11–0	Masterson (2–5)	Buchholz (8–4)		14,022	22–36
59	June 10	Red Sox	8–7	Wood (1–2)	Bard (1–2)		20,446	23–36
60	June 11	Nationals	7–2	Westbrook (4–3)	Atilano (5–3)	Perez (6)	22,041	24–36
61	June 12	Nationals	7–1	Carmona (5–5)	Martin (0–2)		19,484	25–36
62	June 13	Nationals	9–4	Strasburg (2–0)	Huff (2–8)		32,876	25–37
63	June 15	Mets	7–6	Santana (5–3)	Masterson (2–6)	Rodríguez (14)	12,882	25–38
64	June 16	Mets	8–4	Niese (4–2)	Talbot (7–5)		14,246	25–39
65	June 17	Mets	6–4	Dickey (5–0)	Westbrook (4–4)	Rodríguez (15)	14,339	25–40
66	June 18	@ Pirates	4–3	Carmona (6–5)	Maholm (4–5)	Wood (5)	28,478	26–40
67	June 19	@ Pirates	6–4	Karstens (2–2)	Huff (2–9)	Dotel (13)	38,008	26–41
68	June 20	@ Pirates	5–3	Donnelly (3–1)	Lewis (2–2)	Dotel (14)	29,845	26–42
69	June 22	@ Phillies	2–1	Moyer (8–6)	Talbot (7–6)	Lidge (5)	44,836	26–43
70	June 23	@ Phillies	7–6	Romero (1–0)	Wood (1–3)		44,510	26–44
71	June 24	@ Phillies	12–3	Blanton (3–5)	Carmona (6–6)		45,085	26–45
72	June 25	@ Reds	10–3	Harang (6–7)	Laffey (0–2)		32,844	26–46
73	June 26	@ Reds	6–4	Herrera (1–3)	Masterson (2–7)	Cordero (20)	37,757	26–47
74	June 27	@ Reds	5–3	Talbot (8–6)	Arroyo (7–4)	Wood (6)	25,877	27–47
75	June 28	Blue Jays	2–1	Westbrook (5–4)	Romero (6–4)	Wood (7)	11,577	28–47
76	June 29	Blue Jays	5–4	Carmona (7–6)	Morrow (5–6)	Wood (8)	11,401	29–47
77	June 30	Blue Jays	3–1	Laffey (1–2)	Litsch (0–3)	Perez (7)	12,109	30–47

July: 13–14

#	Date	Opponent	Score	Win	Loss	Save	Attendance	Record
78	July 1	Blue Jays	6–1	Masterson (3–7)	Marcum (7–4)	Herrmann (1)	16,859	31–47
79	July 2	Athletics	3–0	Gonzalez (7–5)	Talbot (8–7)	Bailey (16)	18,629	31–48
80	July 3	Athletics	5–4	Sipp (1–2)	Breslow (3–2)		25,483	32–48
81	July 4	Athletics	3–1	Mazzaro (4–2)	Carmona (7–7)	Bailey (17)	13,940	32–49
82	July 5	@ Rangers	9–3	Smith (1–1)	Beltre (0–1)		25,165	33–49
83	July 6	@ Rangers	12–1	Wilson (7–4)	Masterson (3–8)		20,428	33–50
84	July 7	@ Rangers	4–3	Lewis (8–5)	Talbot (8–8)	Feliz (23)	24,427	33–51
85	July 8	@ Rays	5–2	Davis (6–9)	Westbrook (5–5)	Wheeler (1)	16,892	33–52
86	July 9	@ Rays	9–3	Carmona (8–7)	Shields (7–9)		23,116	34–52
87	July 10	@ Rays	4–0	Garza (10–5)	Laffey (1–3)		20,091	34–53
88	July 11	@ Rays	6–5	Sonnanstine (2–0)	Wood (1–4)		24,687	34–54
89	July 16	Tigers	8–2	Westbrook (6–5)	Scherzer (6–7)		22,295	35–54
90	July 17	Tigers	4–3	Carmona (9–7)	Coke (5–1)	Perez (8)	20,090	36–54
91	July 17	Tigers	2–1	Pérez (2–0)	Weinhardt (0–1)		20,902	37–54
92	July 18	Tigers	7–2	Gómez (1–0)	Oliver (0–4)		19,102	38–54
93	July 19	@ Twins	10–4	Laffey (2–3)	Baker (7–8)		40,853	39–54
94	July 20	@ Twins	4–3	Pérez (3–0)	Mijares (1–1)	Perez (9)	40,745	40–54
95	July 21	@ Twins	6–0	Liriano (8–7)	Westbrook (6–6)		40,799	40–55
96	July 23	Rays	3–1	Carmona (10–7)	Niemann (8–3)	Sipp (1)	16,904	41–55
97	July 24	Rays	6–3	Price (13–5)	Talbot (8–9)	Soriano (25)	17,221	41–56
98	July 25	Rays	4–2	Davis (8–9)	Maserson (3–9)	Soriano (26)	13,410	41–57
99	July 26	Yankees	3–2	Vázquez (9–7)	Westbrook (6–7)	Rivera (21)	27,224	41–58
100	July 27	Yankees	4–1	Tomlin (1–0)	Sabathia (13–4)	Perez (10)	27,416	42–58
101	July 28	Yankees	8–0	Burnett (9–8)	Carmona (10–8)		22,965	42–59
102	July 29	Yankees	11–4	Moseley (1–0)	Herrmann (0–1)		34,455	42–60
103	July 30	@ Blue Jays	8–1	Marcum (10–4)	Masterson (3–10)		20,228	42–61
104	July 31	@ Blue Jays	2–1	Lewis (3–2)	Tallet (1–4)	Perez (11)	22,663	43–61

August: 10–18

#	Date	Opponent	Score	Win	Loss	Save	Attendance	Record
105	August 1	@ Blue Jays	5–4	Gómez (2–0)	Litsch (1–5)	Perez (12)	21,797	44–61
106	August 2	@ Red Sox	6–5	Carmona' (11–8)	Lackey (10–6)	Perez (13)	37,931	45–61
107	August 3	@ Red Sox	3–1	Beckett (3–1)	Huff (2–10)	Papelbon (25)	37,714	45–62
108	August 4	@ Red Sox	9–1	Masterson (4–10)	Lester (11–7)		37,902	46–62
109	August 5	@ Red Sox	6–2	Matsuzaka (8–3)	Tomlin (1–1)	Papelbon (26)	38,102	46–63
110	August 6	Twins	7–6	Perez (1–2)	Guerrier (2–7)		25,275	47–63
111	August 7	Twins	7–2	Pavano (14–7)	Carmona (11–9)		27,638	47–64
112	August 8	Twins	5–4	Duensing (5–1)	Huff (2–11)	Capps (28)	17,427	47–65
113	August 10	Orioles	14–8	Arrieta (4–3)	Masterson (4–11)		13,541	47–66
114	August 11	Orioles	3–1	Bergesen (4–9)	Tomlin (1–2)		11,155	47–67
115	August 12	Orioles	4–1	Gómez (3–0)	Millwood (2–12)	Perez (14)	14,533	48–67
116	August 13	Mariners	3–2	Pauley (1–4)	Carmona (11–10)	Aardsma (23)	26,424	48–68
117	August 14	Mariners	9–3	Vargas (9–5)	Talbot (8–10)		25,980	48–69
118	August 15	Mariners	9–1	Sipp (2–2)	Hernández (8–10)		14,888	49–69
119	August 17	@ Royals	2–1	Greinke (8–11)	Gómez (3–1)	Soria (34)	13,258	49–70
120	August 18	@ Royals	9–7	Chen (8–6)	Carmona (11–11)	Soria (35)	12,864	49–71
121	August 19	@ Royals	7–3	R. Perez (4–0)	Wood (1–3)	C. Perez (15)	9,732	50–71
122	August 20	@ Tigers	6–0	Galarraga (4–5)	Masterson (4–12)		33,936	50–72
123	August 21	@ Tigers	5–2	Scherzer (9–9)	Tomlin (1–3)	Valverde (24)	38,088	50–73
124	August 22	@ Tigers	8–1	Verlander (14–8)	Gómez (3–2)		35,104	50–74
125	August 24	Athletics	5–0	Gonzalez (11–8)	Carmona (11–12)		11,751	50–75
126	August 25	Athletics	6–1	Cahill (14–5)	Talbot (8–11)		10,514	50–76
127	August 26	Athletics	3–2	Masterson (5–12)	Mazzaro (6–6)	C. Perez (16)	11,826	51–76
128	August 27	Royals	15–4	Tomlin (2–3)	Bullington (1–3)		17,631	52–76
129	August 28	Royals	4–3 (10)	C. Perez (2–2)	Chavez (5–4)		16,372	53–76
130	August 29	Royals	6–2	Chen (9–7)	Carmona (11–13)		19,725	53–77
131	August 30	White Sox	10–6 (11)	Linebrink (2–1)	R. Perez (4–1)		10,663	53–78
132	August 31	White Sox	4–3	Jackson (9–10)	Smith (1–2)	Jenks (25)	12,006	53–79

September/October: 16–14

#	Date	Opponent	Score	Win	Loss	Save	Attendance	Record
133	September 1	White Sox	6–4	Peña (4–2)	Germano (0–1)	Sale (1)		53–80
134	September 2	@ Mariners	6–3	Tomlin (3–3)	Fister (4–11)	C. Perez (17)		54–80
135	September 3	@ Mariners	1–0	French (4–4)	Carmona (11–14)	Aardsma (27)		54–81
136	September 4	@ Mariners	4–2	Talbot (9–11)	Pauly (2–7)	C. Perez (18)		55–81
137	September 5	@ Mariners	3–0	Hernández (11–10)	Gómez (3–3)			55–82
138	September 6	@ Angels	3–2	Lewis (4–2)	Rodney (4–2)	C. Perez (19)		56–82
139	September 7	@ Angels	6–1	Masterson (6–12)	Bell (2–5)			57–82
140	September 8	@ Angels	4–3 (16)	Palmer (1–1)	Ambriz (0–2)			57–83
141	September 10	Twins	2–0	Carmona (12–14)	Pavano (16–11)			58–83
142	September 11	Twins	1–0 (12)	Guerrier	Germano (0–2)	Capps (38)		58–84
143	September 12	Twins	6–2	Slowey (12–6)	Talbot (9–12)			58–85
144	September 14	Angels	4–3	Tomlin (4–3)	Kazmir (8–14)	C. Perez (20)		59–85
145	September 15	Angels	7–0	Weaver (12–11)	Gómez (3–4)			59–86
146	September 16	Angels	3–2 (11)	R. Perez (5–1)	Cassevah (0–1)			60–86
147	September 17	@ Royals	11–4	Carrasco (1–0)	Davies (8–10)			61–86
148	September 18	@ Royals	6–4	Smith (2–2)	O'Sullivan (2–6)	C. Perez (21)		62–86
149	September 19	@ Royals	6–4	Hochevar (6–5)	Tomlin (4–4)			62–87
150	September 20	@ Twins	9–3	Duensing (10–2)	Gómez (3–5)			62–88
151	September 21	@ Twins	6–4	Perkins (1–1)	Masterson (6–13)	Capps (41)		62–89
152	September 22	@ Twins	5–1	Blackburn (10–10)	Carrasco (1–1)			62–90
153	September 23	Royals	4–2	O'Sullivan (3–6)	Talbot (9–13)	Soria (41)		62–91
154	September 24	Royals	7–3	Tomlin (5–4)	Hochevar (6–6)			63–91
155	September 25	Royals	7–1	Gómez (4–5)	Greinke (9–14)			64–91
156	September 26	Royals	5–3	R. Perez (6–1)	Tejeda (3–5)	Pestano (1)		65–91
157	September 27	Tigers	6–3	Carrasco (2–1)	Galarraga (4–8)	C. Perez (22)		66–91
N/A	September 28	Tigers	Postponed (rain)					
158	September 29	Tigers	4–0	Talbot (10–13)	Scherzer (12–11)			67–91
159	September 29	Tigers	4–3	Tomlin (6–4)	Verlander (18–9)	C. Perez (23)		
160	October 1	@ White Sox	7–3	Carmona (13–14)	Peña (5–3)			69–91
161	October 2	@ White Sox	6–2	Buehrle (13–13)	Carrasco (2–2)			69–92
162	October 3	@ White Sox	6–5	Jackson (10–12)	Germano (0–3)	Sale (4)		69–93

== Player stats ==
=== Batting ===
Note: G = Games played; AB = At bats; R = Runs scored; H = Hits; 2B = Doubles; 3B = Triples; HR = Home runs; RBI = Runs batted in; AVG = Batting average; SB = Stolen bases

Player	G	AB	R	H	2B	3B	HR	RBI	AVG	SB
Héctor Ambriz	1	0	0	0	0	0	0	0	—	0
Michael Brantley	72	297	38	73	9	3	3	22	.246	10
Jordan Brown	26	87	9	20	7	0	0	2	.230	0
Asdrúbal Cabrera	97	381	39	105	16	1	3	29	.276	6
Luke Carlin	6	14	4	5	0	0	2	3	.357	0
Fausto Carmona	2	4	0	0	0	0	0	0	.000	0
Shin-Soo Choo	144	550	81	165	31	2	22	90	.300	22
Trevor Crowe	122	442	48	111	24	3	2	36	.251	20
Jason Donald	88	296	39	75	19	3	4	24	.253	5
Shelley Duncan	85	229	29	53	10	0	11	36	.231	1
Chris Gimenez	28	58	6	11	5	0	1	8	.190	0
Mark Grudzielanek	30	110	10	30	0	0	0	11	.273	2
Travis Hafner	118	396	46	110	29	0	13	50	.278	2
Anderson Hernández	22	61	6	15	3	0	0	2	.246	1
Frank Herrmann	5	0	0	0	0	0	0	0	—	0
David Huff	1	2	0	0	0	0	0	0	.000	0
Austin Kearns	84	301	42	82	18	1	8	42	.272	4
Matt LaPorta	110	376	41	83	15	1	12	41	.221	0
Aaron Laffey	1	1	0	0	0	0	0	0	.000	0
Jensen Lewis	3	0	0	0	0	0	0	0	—	0
Lou Marson	87	262	29	51	15	0	3	22	.195	8
Andy Marte	80	170	18	39	7	2	5	19	.229	0
Justin Masterson	2	4	0	1	0	0	0	0	.250	0
Jayson Nix	78	282	29	66	14	0	13	29	.234	1
Jhonny Peralta	91	334	37	82	23	2	7	43	.246	1
Chris Perez	4	0	0	0	0	0	0	0	—	0
Rafael Perez	5	0	0	0	0	0	0	0	—	0
Mike Redmond	22	63	7	13	4	0	0	5	.206	0
Carlos Santana	46	150	23	39	13	0	6	22	.260	3
Tony Sipp	4	0	0	0	0	0	0	0	—	0
Grady Sizemore	33	128	15	27	6	2	0	13	.211	4
Joe Smith	3	0	0	0	0	0	0	0	—	0
Drew Sutton	11	36	4	8	1	0	1	4	.222	0
Mitch Talbot	2	5	0	0	0	0	0	0	.000	0
Luis Valbuena	91	275	22	53	12	0	2	24	.193	1
Jake Westbrook	1	2	0	0	0	0	0	0	.000	0
Kerry Wood	4	0	0	0	0	0	0	0	—	0
Team Totals	162	5487	646	1362	290	20	128	601	.248	91

=== Pitching ===
Note: W = Wins; L = Losses; ERA = Earned run average; G = Games pitched; GS = Games started; SV = Saves; IP = Innings pitched; H = Hits allowed; R = Runs allowed; ER = Earned runs allowed; BB = Walks allowed; K = Strikeouts

Player	W	L	ERA	G	GS	SV	IP	H	R	ER	BB	K
Héctor Ambriz	0	2	5.59	34	0	0	48.1	68	31	30	17	37
Fausto Carmona	13	14	3.77	33	33	0	210.1	203	98	88	72	124
Carlos Carrasco	2	2	3.83	7	7	0	44.2	47	20	19	14	38
Justin Germano	0	3	3.31	23	1	0	35.1	27	15	13	8	29
Jeanmar Gómez	4	5	4.68	11	11	0	57.2	73	36	30	22	34
Frank Herrmann	0	1	4.03	40	0	1	44.2	48	22	20	9	24
David Huff	2	11	6.21	15	15	0	79.2	101	61	55	34	37
Aaron Laffey	2	3	4.53	29	5	0	55.2	62	30	28	28	28
Jensen Lewis	4	2	2.97	37	0	0	36.1	28	12	12	19	29
Andy Marte	0	0	0.00	1	0	0	1.0	0	0	0	0	1
Justin Masterson	6	13	4.70	34	29	0	180.0	197	107	94	73	140
Chris Perez	2	2	1.71	63	0	23	63.0	40	15	12	28	61
Rafael Pérez	6	1	3.25	70	0	0	61.0	72	23	22	25	36
Vinnie Pestano	0	0	3.60	5	0	1	5.0	4	2	2	5	8
Tony Sipp	2	2	4.14	70	0	1	63.0	48	30	29	39	69
Joe Smith	2	2	3.83	53	0	0	40.0	30	18	17	24	32
Mitch Talbot	10	13	4.41	28	28	0	159.1	169	88	78	69	88
Jess Todd	0	0	7.50	5	0	0	6.0	9	5	5	3	9
Josh Tomlin	6	4	4.56	12	12	0	73.0	72	38	37	19	43
Jake Westbrook	6	7	4.65	21	21	0	127.2	133	68	66	44	73
Kerry Wood	1	4	6.30	23	0	8	20.0	21	15	14	11	18
Jamey Wright	1	2	5.48	18	0	0	21.1	25	18	13	9	9
Team Totals	69	93	4.30	162	162	34	1433.0	1477	752	684	572	967

== Farm system ==
Level	Team	League	Manager
AAA	Columbus Clippers	International League	Mike Sarbaugh
AA	Akron Aeros	Eastern League	Joel Skinner
A	Kinston Eagles	Carolina League	Aaron Holbert
A	Lake County Captains	Midwest League	Ted Kubiak
A-Short Season	Mahoning Valley Scrappers	New York–Penn League	Travis Fryman
Rookie	AZL Indians	Arizona League	Chris Tremie

LEAGUE CHAMPIONS: Columbus, Lake County
