= Frank Mata =

Venezuelan baseball player (born 1984)

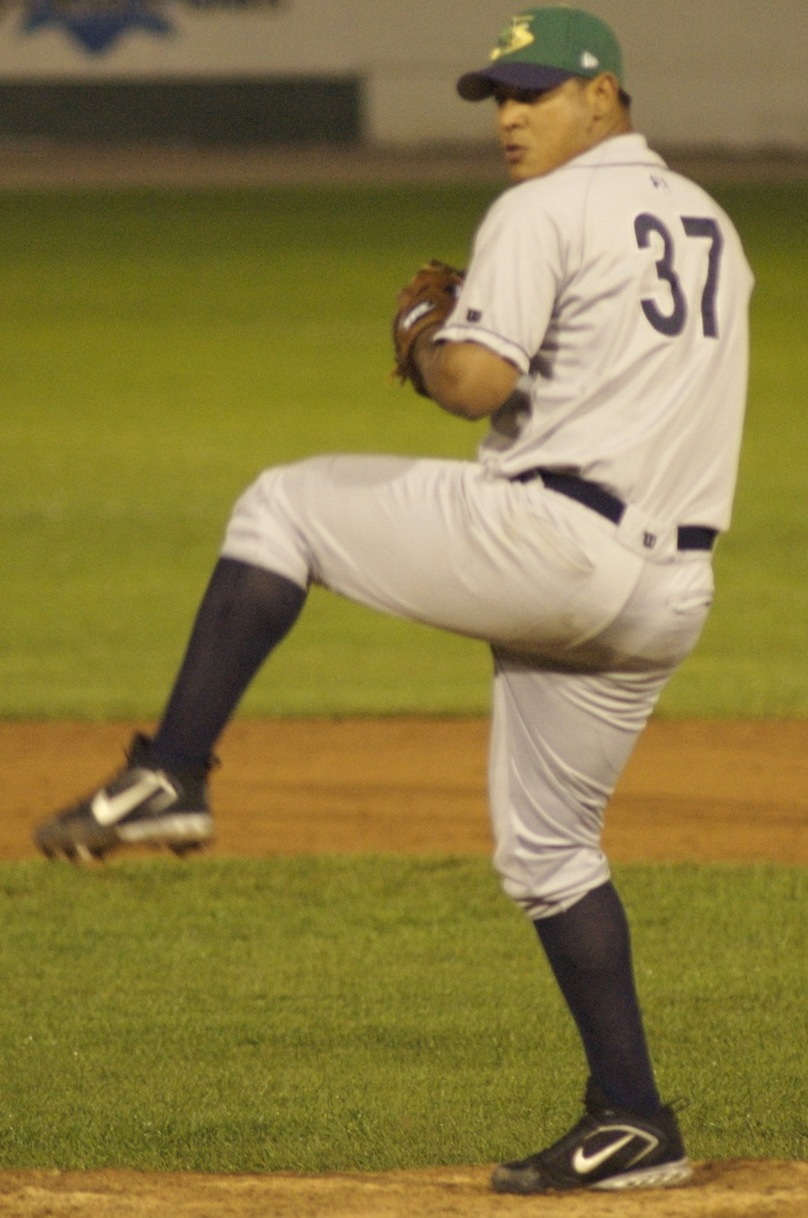
- Mata with the Beloit Snappers in 2006
- Relief pitcher
- Born: March 11, 1984 (age 42); Barcelona, Venezuela
- Batted: Right Threw: Right

MLB debut
- May 26, 2010, for the Baltimore Orioles

Last MLB appearance
- July 18, 2010, for the Baltimore Orioles

MLB statistics
- Win–loss record: 0-0
- Earned run average: 7.79
- Strikeouts: 9
- Stats at Baseball Reference

Teams
- Baltimore Orioles (2010)

Frank Jesús Mata (born March 11, 1984) is a Venezuelan former professional baseball pitcher. He played in Major League Baseball (MLB) for the Baltimore Orioles.

== Career ==
=== Minnesota Twins ===
Mata was in the Minnesota Twins minor league system from 2004-2009 and he became a free agent after the 2009 season.

=== Baltimore Orioles ===
Mata signed a minor league contract with the Orioles Baltimore Orioles in 2010. He was called up after closing for the Triple-A Norfolk Tides to replace Alfredo Simón. He made his debut on May 26 against the Oakland Athletics and went 1 1/3 innings with one hit and one walk in relief of Brian Matusz. Mata's worst outing came on June 14, against the San Francisco Giants, when he gave up four runs in 1 2/3 inning. He came in the 7th for Matt Albers, finished the 7th clean, but in the 8th, he gave up a double to Juan Uribe, gave up 2 bases-loaded walks to Travis Ishikawa and Andrés Torres, then a two-RBI single to Freddy Sanchez.

=== Florida Marlins ===
On November 24, 2010, Mata signed a minor league contract with the Florida Marlins organization. He made 35 appearances out of the bullpen for the Triple-A New Orleans Zephyrs in 2011, posting a 1-6 record and 5.24 ERA with 30 strikeouts and two saves across 46 1/3 innings pitched. Mata was released by the Marlins organization in late July 2011.

=== Piratas de Campeches ===
On March 26, 2012, Mata signed with the Piratas de Campeche of the Mexican League. He was released by the Piratas on June 12.

=== Olmecas de Tabasco ===
On June 26, 2012, Mata signed with the Olmecas de Tabasco of the Mexican League. He was released by the Olmecas on June 29.

=== Templiers de Sénart ===
In 2018, Mata played with Templiers de Sénart in the French Division 1 Baseball Championship.

== See also ==
- List of Major League Baseball players from Venezuela
