= Rhyne Hughes =

American baseball player (born 1983)

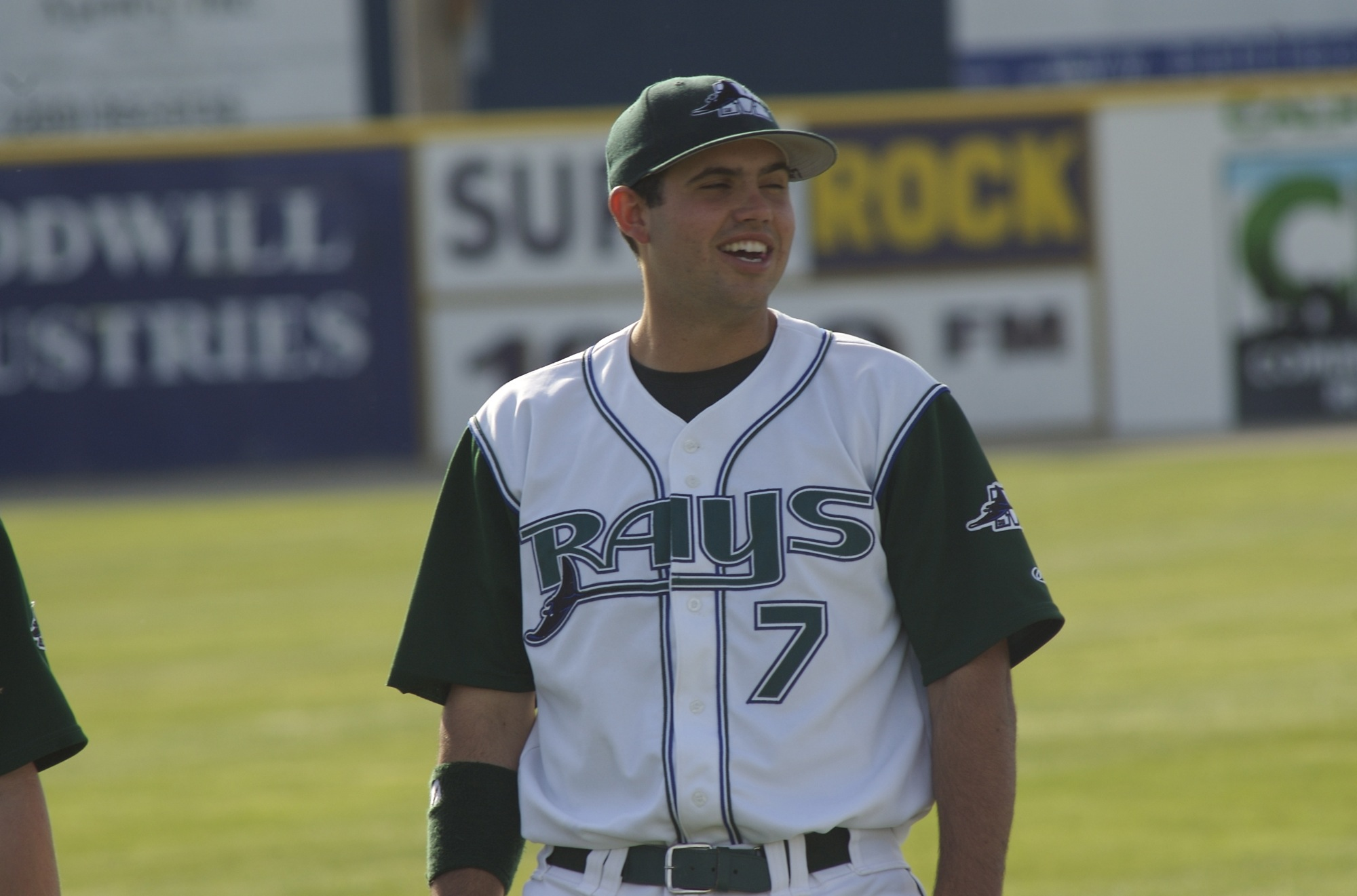
- Hughes with the Southwest Michigan Devil Rays in 2006
- First baseman
- Born: September 9, 1983 (age 42); Picayune, Mississippi
- Batted: Left Threw: Left

MLB debut
- April 24, 2010, for the Baltimore Orioles

Last MLB appearance
- May 14, 2010, for the Baltimore Orioles

MLB statistics
- Batting average: .213
- Home runs: 0
- Runs batted in: 4
- Stats at Baseball Reference

Teams
- Baltimore Orioles (2010)

John Rhyne Hughes (born September 9, 1983) is an American former professional baseball first baseman. He played in Major League Baseball (MLB) for the Baltimore Orioles.

== Early life and college career ==
Born in Picayune, Mississippi, Hughes attended Picayune Memorial High School, before matriculating at Pearl River Community College. During his final college season, he hit .404 with 17 home runs and 70 RBIs in only 171 at-bats, while pitching 23.1 innings with a 2.70 ERA, striking out 25 and walking 6. In the summer of 2004, Hughes played for the Duluth Huskies in the summer collegiate Northwoods League. Hughes was drafted in the 2003 MLB draft by the Pittsburgh Pirates in the 50th round (1462nd overall), but chose to stay in school at Pearl River Community College. In the 2004 MLB draft, he was selected in the eighth round (225th overall) by the Tampa Bay Devil Rays, receiving a $275,000 signing bonus.

== Professional career ==
=== Tampa Bay Rays ===
Hughes made his professional debut in 2005 with Short-Season A Hudson Valley, where in 58 games, he hit .279 with 8 HR and 30 RBI. Hughes played 2006 with Single-A Southwest Michigan, where in 114 games, he hit .233 with 3 HR, 39 RBI and 102 strikeouts in a down year. Hughes began 2007 with High-A Vero Beach, where he hit .329 with 12 HR and 57 RBI in 94 games before earning a promotion to Double-A Montgomery on August 1. In 115 games in 2007, he hit .323 with 14 HR and 72 RBI. Hughes played 2008 with Montgomery, where in 107 games, he hit .268 with 14 HR, 52 RBI and 112 strikeouts. After 2008, he played in the offseason in the Arizona Fall League with Peoria, where in 27 games, he hit .394 with 5 HR, 27 RBI and 12 doubles.

Hughes began 2009 with Montgomery, where he was a Southern League All-Star, joining fellow Biscuits Jeremy Hellickson, Desmond Jennings and Eddie Morlan. In 58 games with Montgomery in 2009, he hit .252 with 15 HR, which led the league at the time of his promotion, and 46 RBI. On June 9, Hughes was promoted to Triple-A Durham.

=== Baltimore Orioles ===
On August 8, 2009, the Baltimore Orioles traded catcher Gregg Zaun to the Rays for cash or a player to be named later. A week later, the Orioles announced that Hughes was the player who would complete the trade. He was assigned to the Triple-A Norfolk Tides after the trade. In 76 games at Triple-A between Durham and Norfolk, he hit .301 with 10 home runs and 33 RBI. Hughes was added to the Orioles' 40-man roster in November 2009, protecting him from the Rule 5 draft. Hughes was invited to spring training with the Orioles in 2010, where in 15 games, he hit .316 with 3 HR and 6 RBI before being cut on March 26. Hughes began 2010 with Norfolk and was their Opening Day right fielder.

On April 24, 2010, Hughes was recalled by the Orioles, replacing Justin Turner. He split time at first base with the struggling Garrett Atkins in his time up. He set a franchise record by recording an RBI in his first 3 games in the major leagues. However, his initial success did not hold up, as he went 3-24 in the last 8 games of his 14-game stint with the Orioles. On May 16, he was optioned back to Norfolk. With the Orioles he hit .213 with 4 RBI. He finished 2010 with Norfolk, where in 104 games, he hit .258 with 10 HR and 39 RBI. On November 18, Hughes was outrighted off the 40-man roster.

Hughes played 2011 with Norfolk where in 92 games, he hit .249 with 15 HR and 59 RBI. After the season, Hughes was given a 50-game suspension after testing positive for a performance-enhancing substance.

Hughes played 2012 with the Double-A Bowie Baysox, where in 75 games, he hit .278 with 13 home runs and 51 RBI.

=== New York Mets ===
On February 25, 2013, Hughes signed a minor-league deal with the New York Mets. He played 2013 with the Double-A Binghamton Mets. He missed 2 months of the season with left shoulder/arm pain. In 53 games, he hit .278 with 5 HR and 30 RBI. On November 4, Hughes elected free agency.

Hughes was given a 100-game suspension on February 21, 2014, for exogenous testosterone. This is effective when Hughes signs with another affiliated organization.

=== Winnipeg Goldeyes ===
Hughes signed with the Winnipeg Goldeyes of the American Association of Independent Professional Baseball in March 2014.
