= Francisco Rodríguez (Mexican pitcher) =

Mexican baseball player (born 1983)

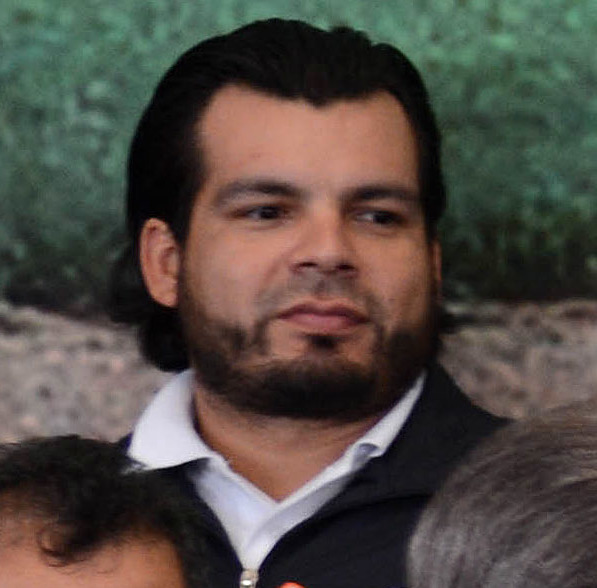
- Rodríguez at Los Pinos with Tigres de Quintana Roo in 2013
- Pitcher
- Born: February 26, 1983 (age 43); Mexicali, Mexico
- Batted: Right Threw: Right

MLB debut
- April 15, 2010, for the Los Angeles Angels of Anaheim

Last MLB appearance
- May 9, 2011, for the Los Angeles Angels of Anaheim

MLB statistics
- Win–loss: 1–3
- Earned run average: 4.43
- Strikeouts: 43
- Stats at Baseball Reference

Teams
- Los Angeles Angels of Anaheim (2010–2011)

Francisco Rodríguez Murillo (born February 26, 1983) is a Mexican former professional baseball pitcher. He played in Major League Baseball (MLB) for the Los Angeles Angels of Anaheim from 2010 to 2011.

== Career ==
=== Pericos de Puebla ===
Rodríguez began his career in the Mexican League in 2005 with the Pericos de Puebla. In 33 appearances for Puebla, Rodríguez logged a 4-4 record and 5.61 ERA with 36 strikeouts in 85.0 innings of work.

=== Los Angeles Angels ===
On December 26, 2005, Rodríguez signed a minor league contract with the Los Angeles Angels of Anaheim. In 2006, he won the California League Pitcher of the Week honors while pitching for the High-A Rancho Cucamonga Quakes. On the year, he logged a 5-13 record and 5.47 ERA in 26 appearances. For the 2007 season, Rodríguez returned to Rancho Cucamonga and posted a 4-8 record and 5.96 ERA in 39 games with the team. The next year, Rodriguez played in Double-A with the Arkansas Travelers, pitching to a 5-5 record and 3.82 ERA with 69 strikeouts in 75 1/3 innings pitched. In 2009, he played for the Triple-A Salt Lake Bees, recording a 5-4 record and 3.96 ERA with 60 strikeouts in 44 appearances.

On April 14, 2010, Rodríguez was selected to the 40-man roster and promoted to the major leagues for the first time after closer Brian Fuentes was placed on the disabled list. He made his major league debut the next day, pitching 1 scoreless inning against the New York Yankees. He finished his rookie season with a 4.37 ERA and 36 strikeouts in 43 major league games with the Angels. In 2011, Rodríguez made 10 appearances for the Angels, posting a 4.61 ERA, but missed much of the year with right shoulder inflammation. On November 17, 2011, Rodríguez was removed from the 40-man roster and sent outright to Salt Lake. He was assigned to Triple–A Salt Lake to begin the 2012 season. After struggling to a 6.35 ERA in 40 appearances, on August 7, 2012, Rodríguez was released by the Angels organization.

=== Tigres de Quintana Roo ===
On March 20, 2013, Rodríguez signed with the Tigres de Quintana Roo of the Mexican League. For the 2013 season, Rodríguez recorded a 3–4 record and 4.47 ERA in 47 appearances. The next year, he registered a 4–7 record and 4.26 ERA with 42 strikeouts in 50 2/3 innings pitched. In 2015, he pitched in 35 contests for the Tigres, logging a 4.25 ERA in 36 innings of work.

=== Leones de Yucatán ===
On July 14, 2015, Rodríguez was traded to the Leones de Yucatán. He finished the year with a stellar 0.63 ERA in 15 appearances for Yucatán. In 2016, Rodríguez logged a 2.98 ERA with 28 strikeouts in 42 1/3 innings pitched. Rodríguez re-signed with the Leones on April 4, 2017. On the year, Rodríguez posted an 8-6 record and 3.34 ERA with 53 strikeouts in 97 innings of work.

=== Olmecas de Tabasco ===
On December 21, 2017, Rodríguez was traded to the Olmecas de Tabasco in exchange for Kristian Delgado. In 2018, he pitched to a 5à8 record with 57 strikeouts in 109.0 innings of work. In 11 games for Tabasco in 2019, Rodríguez recorded a 4–4 record and 7.80 ERA with 33 strikeouts over 57 2/3 innings pitched.

=== Piratas de Campeche ===
On June 9, 2019, Rodríguez was loaned to the Piratas de Campeche. Rodríguez made 4 appearances for Campeche in 2019, posting a 1-1 record and 6.64 ERA with 11 strikeouts.

=== Saraperos de Saltillo ===
On July 20, 2019, the Piratas loaned Rodríguez to the Saraperos de Saltillo. He made one appearance for the club, pitching 5 1/3 innings of 4–run ball. On October 4, Rodríguez was returned to the Piratas de Campeche.

=== Rieleros de Aguascalientes ===
On December 9, 2019, Rodríguez was traded to the Rieleros de Aguascalientes, but was released prior to the season, which was later cancelled due to the COVID-19 pandemic, on March 24, 2020. On February 11, 2021, Rodríguez re-signed with the Rieleros for the upcoming season. After pitching a scoreless inning with Aguascalientes, he was released on June 16.

=== Tecolotes de los Dos Laredos ===
On June 20, 2021, Rodríguez signed with the Tecolotes de los Dos Laredos of the Mexican League. In 2 games for Dos Laredos, he struggled to an 8.10 ERA with no strikeouts across 3 1/3 innings. Rodríguez became a free agent following the season.

== International career ==
He was selected Mexico national baseball team at 2009 World Baseball Classic, 2013 World Baseball Classic and 2019 exhibition games against Japan.
