= Héctor Ambriz =

American baseball player (born 1984)

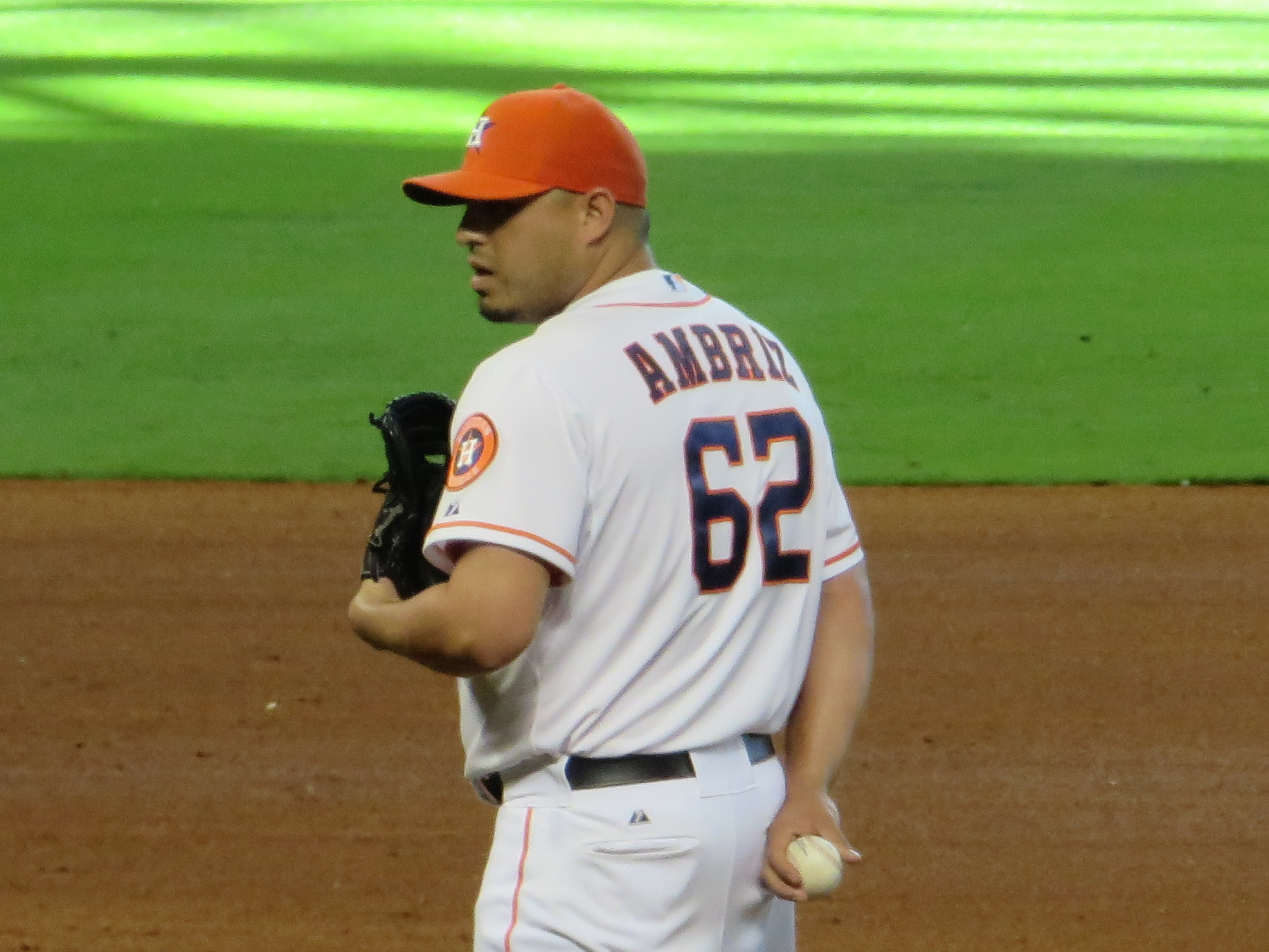
- Ambriz with the Houston Astros
- Pitcher
- Born: May 24, 1984 (age 42); Orange, California, U.S.
- Batted: Left Threw: Right

MLB debut
- April 30, 2010, for the Cleveland Indians

Last MLB appearance
- May 7, 2014, for the San Diego Padres

MLB statistics
- Win–loss record: 3–7
- Earned run average: 5.35
- Strikeouts: 87
- Stats at Baseball Reference

Teams
- Cleveland Indians (2010); Houston Astros (2012–2013); San Diego Padres (2014)

Héctor Ambriz (born May 24, 1984) is an American former professional baseball pitcher. He has played in Major League Baseball (MLB) for the Cleveland Indians, Houston Astros, and San Diego Padres.

== Early life ==
Ambriz, who is of Mexican-American descent, was born in Orange, California and graduated from Valencia High School in Placentia, California. He played college baseball for the UCLA Bruins.

== Professional career ==
=== Arizona Diamondbacks ===
He was drafted by the Arizona Diamondbacks in the fifth round (147th overall) of the 2006 Major League Baseball draft. He made his professional debut for the rookie ball Missoula Osprey, recording a 1.91 ERA in 15 games. In 2007, Ambriz played for the High-A Visalia Oaks, registering a 10–8 record and 4.08 ERA. He spent the 2008 season with the Double-A Mobile BayBears, pitching to a 5–13 record and 4.89 ERA in 27 games. He was invited to Spring Training for the 2009 season but did not make the club. He split the 2009 season between Mobile and the Triple-A Reno Aces, accumulating a 12–11 record and 4.94 ERA in 28 appearances.

=== Cleveland Indians ===
Ambriz was selected by the Cleveland Indians from the Diamondbacks in the 2009 Rule 5 draft. Ambriz pitched to a 5.59 ERA in 34 games for Cleveland in 2010. On September 21, 2010, Ambriz was shut down for the remainder of the 2010 season with soreness in his right elbow. He was outrighted to Triple-A Columbus and removed from the 40-man roster on October 29. After undergoing Tommy John surgery to repair a torn UCL in his right elbow, he missed the entire 2011 season.

In 2012, Ambriz was assigned to the Triple-A Columbus Clippers, where he pitched to a 3.55 ERA in 20 games. On June 17, 2012, Ambriz was released from the Indians organization.

=== Houston Astros ===
On June 19, 2012, Amrbiz signed a minor league contract with the Houston Astros organization and was assigned to the Triple-A Oklahoma City RedHawks. Ambriz had his contract selected to the active roster on August 22. He recorded a 4.19 ERA in 18 games for Houston in 2012. Ambriz recorded a 5.70 ERA in 36.1 innings in 2013 before he was designated for assignment on September 5, 2013. On October 1, 2013, Ambriz elected free agency.

=== San Diego Padres ===
On March 18, 2014, Ambriz signed a minor league contract with the San Diego Padres organization. He was assigned to the Triple-A El Paso Chihuahuas to begin the 2014 season. On May 7, Ambriz was selected to the active roster. After allowing an earned run in 2.0 innings of work, Ambriz was designated for assignment on May 8. On May 10, Ambriz was outrighted to Triple-A. On August 21, 2014, Ambriz was released by the Padres organization.

=== Long Island Ducks ===
Ambriz signed with the Long Island Ducks of the Atlantic League of Professional Baseball for the 2015 season. Ambriz recorded a 1.29 ERA in 7 games for the Ducks.

=== Washington Nationals ===
On May 10, 2015, he signed a minor league deal with the Washington Nationals and was assigned to the Double-A Harrisburg Senators. He recorded a 12.46 ERA in 10 games before being released on June 12, 2015.

=== Toros de Tijuana ===
On December 18, 2015, Ambriz signed with the Toros de Tijuana of the Mexican League. He pitched to a 1.41 ERA in 11 appearances in 2016 and was an LMB All-Star. Ambriz did not play in a game in 2017 due to injury. He recorded 36 strikeouts in 11 games in 2018 for Tijuana..

=== Rieleros de Aguascalientes ===
On January 9, 2019, Ambriz was traded to the Rieleros de Aguascalientes of the Mexican League. He recorded a 10.43 ERA in 11 games for Aguascalientes.

=== Saraperos de Saltillo ===
On June 26, 2019, Ambriz was traded to the Saraperos de Saltillo of the Mexican League. He finished the season pitching to a 3–3 record and 6.34 ERA in 10 appearances. Ambriz did not play in a game in 2020 due to the cancellation of the Mexican League season because of the COVID-19 pandemic. On November 13, 2020, Ambriz was released.

== See also ==
- List of Mexican Americans
- List of University of California, Los Angeles people
