= 2011 Detroit Tigers season =

Major League Baseball season

2011 Detroit Tigers
- American League Central champions
- League: American League
- Division: Central
- Ballpark: Comerica Park
- City: Detroit, Michigan
- Record: 95–67 (.586)
- Divisional place: 1st
- Owners: Mike Ilitch
- General managers: Dave Dombrowski
- Managers: Jim Leyland
- Television: Fox Sports Detroit (Mario Impemba; Rod Allen)
- Radio: Detroit Tigers Radio Network (Dan Dickerson; Jim Price)
- Stats: ESPN.com; Baseball Reference

The 2011 Detroit Tigers season was the team's 111th season. The season began on March 31 at New York against the Yankees, and the home opener was on April 8 against the Kansas City Royals. The Tigers honored the late Sparky Anderson during the season. The Tigers sent five players to the 2011 Major League Baseball All-Star Game: starting pitcher Justin Verlander, first baseman Miguel Cabrera, catcher Alex Avila, shortstop Jhonny Peralta, and closer José Valverde. The regular season concluded September 28 at home against the Cleveland Indians, with the Tigers holding a 95–67 record.

The season saw the team's first 11-game winning streak since 1968, and first nine-game winning streak since 1984 – both years in which the Tigers went on to win the World Series. The streak ended at 12 games on September 14. It consisted of four consecutive three-game sweeps over their AL Central Division rivals. It was the Tigers longest winning streak since the 1934 team won 14 straight.

On September 16, the Tigers clinched the AL Central Division title with a 3–1 win over the Oakland Athletics. It was their first American League Central Division title since they joined the division in 1998, and the team's first division title of any kind since winning the American League East in 1987. They became the first team of the season to qualify for the American League Division Series, and first team in either league to clinch their division. The Tigers clinched the division with 11 games left to play, tying the franchise record set by the 1984 team. Justin Verlander was named both American League Cy Young Award winner and AL Most Valuable Player for an outstanding season that saw him lead the league in wins (24), strikeouts (250) and ERA (2.40).

On October 6, the Tigers beat the New York Yankees in Game 5 of the ALDS, winning the series 3–2, and advancing to the American League Championship Series, which they lost to the Texas Rangers 4–2.

== 2010-11 offseason activities ==
=== Signings ===
- On October 21, the Tigers re-signed third baseman Brandon Inge for two more seasons with an option for a third.
- On November 8, the Tigers re-signed shortstop Jhonny Peralta for two more seasons with an option for a third.
- On November 19, the Tigers signed relief pitcher Joaquín Benoit to a three-year contract.
- On November 24, the Tigers signed catcher/designated hitter Víctor Martínez to a four-year contract.
- On December 16, the Tigers re-signed outfielder Magglio Ordóñez to a one-year contract.
- On January 12, the Tigers re-signed outfielder Ryan Raburn to a two-year deal, avoiding arbitration.
- On January 14, the Tigers re-signed relief pitcher Joel Zumaya to a one-year contract, avoiding arbitration.
- On January 18, the Tigers signed starting pitcher Brad Penny to a one-year deal.
- On February 7, the Tigers re-signed starting pitcher Phil Coke.
- On March 2, the Tigers re-signed relief pitcher Ryan Perry, catcher Alex Avila, utility man Don Kelly, and outfielders Brennan Boesch and Austin Jackson.

=== Releases ===
- On December 14, the Tigers released relief pitcher Alfredo Fígaro.
- On February 1, the Tigers released pitcher Jeremy Bonderman.
- Other losses include outfielder Johnny Damon and catcher Gerald Laird, both to free agency.

=== Trades ===
- On January 24, the Tigers traded starting pitcher Armando Galarraga to Arizona for pitchers Kevin Eichhorn and Ryan Robowski.

== In-season transactions ==
- On May 27, the Tigers traded infielder Scott Sizemore to Oakland for relief pitcher David Purcey.
- On July 20, the Tigers traded pitcher Antonio Cruz and catcher Julio Rodriguez to Kansas City for third baseman Wilson Betemit.
- On July 30, the Tigers traded pitchers Charlie Furbush and Chance Ruffin, outfielder Casper Wells, and third baseman Francisco Martinez to Seattle for pitchers Doug Fister and David Pauley.
- On August 15, the Tigers traded pitchers Cole Nelson and Lester Oliveros to Minnesota for outfielder Delmon Young.

== Personnel changes ==
On July 3, after Tigers pitchers had given up 51 runs in the previous five games (including three games in which 14 or more runs were allowed), pitching coach Rick Knapp was fired. Then-bullpen coach Jeff Jones was named the new pitching coach and Mike Rojas was made the new bullpen coach.

=== Roster ===
2011 Detroit Tigers
Roster
Pitchers: 62 Al Alburquerque; 64 Duane Below; 53 Joaquín Benoit; 40 Phil Coke; 58 Doug Fister; 49 Charlie Furbush; 21 Enrique González; 49 Luis Marte; 43 Andrew Oliver; 44 Lester Oliveros; 38 David Pauley; 31 Brad Penny; 45 Ryan Perry; 48 Rick Porcello; 34 David Purcey; 52 Chance Ruffin; 37 Max Scherzer; 55 Daniel Schlereth; 36 Brad Thomas; 50 Jacob Turner; 46 José Valverde; 35 Justin Verlander; 60 Brayan Villarreal; 34 Robbie Weinhardt; 58 Adam Wilk	Catchers: 13 Alex Avila; 41 Víctor Martínez; 18 Omir Santos; Infielders: 20 Wilson Betemit; 24 Miguel Cabrera; 9 Carlos Guillén; 15 Brandon Inge; 27 Jhonny Peralta; 28 Will Rhymes; 39 Ramón Santiago; 20 Scott Sizemore; 29 Danny Worth; Outfielders: 26 Brennan Boesch; 12 Andy Dirks; 14 Austin Jackson; 32 Don Kelly; 30 Magglio Ordóñez; 25 Ryan Raburn; 57 Casper Wells; 21 Delmon Young	Manager: 10 Jim Leyland; Coaches: 17 Rafael Belliard (infield); 61 Tom Brookens (first base); 51 Jeff Jones (pitching); 22 Gene Lamont (third base); 8 Lloyd McClendon (hitting); 99 Scott Pickens (bullpen catcher); 59 Mike Rojas (bullpen)

== Tributes to Sparky Anderson ==
On November 4, 2010, Sparky Anderson, Tigers manager from 1979 to 1995, died at age 76. In his honor, the Tigers wore a memorial patch on their sleeves (seen at right), and a flag was raised in his honor on Opening Day. Additionally, Anderson's No. 11 jersey was officially retired by the Tigers on June 26, 2011. His name and number were also placed on the left-field wall at Comerica Park, joining other past Tiger greats. Anderson is the second non-player (after broadcaster Ernie Harwell) to have his name on this wall.

== Notable games ==
Below is a chronology of highlights during the 2011 Detroit Tigers regular season.

- March 31: The season opened with a 6–3 loss in New York's Yankee Stadium. Justin Verlander gave up three runs in six innings, but former Tiger Curtis Granderson broke a 3–3 tie in the seventh inning with a two-run home run off reliever Phil Coke.
- April 2: Newly acquired C/DH Víctor Martínez hit his first home run in a Tiger uniform, but starter Brad Penny, another off-season acquisition, surrendered eight runs in 4 1/3 innings as the Tigers fell to the Yankees again, 10–6.
- April 3: The Tigers earned their first victory of the season in a 10–7 slugfest over the Yankees that featured two home runs by Miguel Cabrera and another by Brennan Boesch.
- April 6: Justin Verlander picked up his first win of the season as the Tigers defeated the Baltimore Orioles, 7–3. Catcher Alex Avila hit a home run and drove in a career-high five runs.
- April 11: The Tigers fell to 3–7 on the season with a 2–0 loss to the Texas Rangers, who went to 9–1 with the win. Justin Verlander pitched a complete game, but was outdueled by the Rangers' Alexi Ogando.
- April 12: Detroit rebounded with a 5–4 win against Texas when Miguel Cabrera hit a walk-off bases-loaded single with two out in the bottom of the ninth inning.
- April 13: Brandon Inge hit a solo home run in the bottom of the ninth to give the Tigers their second straight walk-off win, a 3–2 decision over the Rangers.
- April 16: Miguel Cabrera hit a game-tying solo home run in the top of the ninth, and the Tigers scored seven runs in the top of the tenth inning to win their first extra-inning game of the season, 8–4 over the Oakland Athletics. The victory was the 1,500th in manager Jim Leyland's major league career. The victory also put the Tigers (7–7) at the .500 mark for the first time this season.
- April 22: Ryan Raburn hit a home run and collected four RBIs in a 9–3 victory over the Chicago White Sox to help Justin Verlander even his record at 2–2, and get the Tigers back to .500 at 10–10. Verlander fanned A. J. Pierzynski for his 1,000th career strikeout.
- April 24: Max Scherzer threw eight shutout innings in a 3–0 victory over the White Sox, as the Tigers completed a three-game sweep over their AL Central rivals.
- May 1: The Tigers were swept by the division-leading Cleveland Indians, as reliever Joaquín Benoit surrendered three eighth-inning runs in a 5–4 loss. The blazing hot Indians won their 13th straight home game on the season and ran their record to 19–8. It was the sixth straight loss for the Tigers, leaving them at 12–16, 7.5 games back in the AL Central.
- May 2: The Tigers lost their seventh straight game, dropping a 5–3 decision at home to the Yankees. The game was played 72 years to the day that late Yankee slugger Lou Gehrig's 2,130 consecutive games played streak ended in Detroit.
- May 3: The Tigers snapped their seven-game losing streak as Scott Sizemore, just recalled from the minors, went 3-for-4 with an RBI to help the Tigers to a 4–2 win over the Yankees.
- May 5: The Tigers took 3 of 4 from the Yankees, with Brennan Boesch leading the way in a 4–2 Tigers win. Boesch homered and drove in 3 runs, while starter Rick Porcello went seven strong innings.
- May 7: Justin Verlander took a perfect game into the eighth inning in Toronto before surrendering a leadoff walk to Blue Jays catcher J. P. Arencibia. Arencibia would be erased on a double-play, and Verlander completed his second career no-hitter in a 9–0 victory while facing the minimum 27 batters. The Tiger ace fanned four on the day, and helped his cause with a fine defensive play in the fifth inning. Edwin Encarnación hit a line drive that glanced off Verlander's forearm. The Tiger hurler scrambled to retrieve the ball and threw in the dirt to first base, but Miguel Cabrera scooped up the throw to just beat the runner.
- May 9: The Tigers twice sent 10 batters to the plate in an inning (the fourth and seventh) in a 10–5 rout over the Blue Jays that saw Max Scherzer go to 6–0 on the season. Detroit also evened its record again at 18–18.
- May 11: A 64-minute delay due to golf ball sized hail in Minneapolis could not stop the Tigers from again scoring 10 runs and defeating the Minnesota Twins, 10–2. Victor Martinez got three hits and drove in four runs. Twins starter Francisco Liriano had thrown a no-hitter in his previous start, but the Tigers chased him after just three innings in this affair.
- May 12: Jhonny Peralta hit a pinch-hit two-run homer in the top of the eighth inning to tie the game against the Twins, and Tigers went on to win 9–7 after a Brandon Inge RBI triple in the ninth.
- May 13: Making a bid to become the second pitcher in major league history to throw back-to-back no-hitters, Justin Verlander blanked the Kansas City Royals on no hits through 5.2 innings, before surrendering a triple to Melky Cabrera. The Tigers would go on to win their sixth straight, 3–1.
- May 14: Struggling starter Brad Penny righted himself with eight shutout innings, as the Tigers won their seventh straight, 3–0 over the Royals. Closer José Valverde picked up his 10th save in 10 opportunities.
- May 21: The streaky Tigers followed up their seven-game winning streak by losing five straight, this time dropping a 6–2 decision to the Pittsburgh Pirates in an interleague game.
- May 22: The losing streak promptly ended as Rick Porcello tossed a one-hit gem over eight innings and the Tigers collected a 2–0 victory over the Pirates.
- May 23: Charlie Furbush, just brought up from the minors, pitched 3.2 shutout innings in relief of Phil Coke to earn his first big-league victory in a 6–3 decision over the Tampa Bay Rays. Outfielder Andy Dirks, brought up a week prior, hit his first major league home run.
- May 24: Despite Justin Verlander's worst outing of the season, the Tigers managed a 7–6 come-from-behind victory over the Rays. Alex Avila homered twice in the game, including the decisive two-run blow in the eighth inning.
- May 29: Justin Verlander blanked the Boston Red Sox over 7.2 innings, as the Tigers ended a modest three-game losing streak with a 3–0 win in the second game of a doubleheader.
- May 30: Detroit nipped Minnesota, 6–5, when a controversial fan interference call allowed Jhonny Peralta to score the deciding run in the eighth inning on an Alex Avila double.
- May 31: Tiger reliever Al Alburquerque won his second game in as many nights, as Detroit again won a 1-run decision over the Twins, 8–7. Joaquín Benoit, making a rare appearance as a closer because José Valverde had pitched in the three previous games, stranded two runners in the ninth for the save. The Tigers posted a 16–10 record in May to climb to 28–26 on the season, but still trailed the Indians by five games in the AL Central.
- June 4: Miguel Cabrera broke a 2–2 tie with a two-run homer in the top of the ninth inning, and José Valverde converted his 15th straight save opportunity as the Tigers downed the White Sox, 4–2.
- June 5: Mired in a 6-for-52 slump, Tigers second baseman Ryan Raburn hit a Grand Slam in a 6-run fourth inning, helping the Tigers defeat the White Sox, 7–3.
- June 6: Detroit pounded out six doubles and four home runs in a 13–7 slugfest victory, including two homers by Brennan Boesch who went 5-for-6 with 5 RBI. All four homers came off Texas Rangers' starter Colby Lewis.
- June 7: Though none of them were home runs, the Tigers collected another 20 hits to defeat the Rangers, 8–1.
- June 9: Justin Verlander fanned a season-high 10 Seattle Mariners in a 4–1 victory that took only 2 hours and 17 minutes. Alex Avila became just the third Tiger catcher since 1919 to hit two triples in a game. The others were Lance Parrish (1980) and Brad Ausmus (1999).
- June 13: Ramon Santiago hit a walk-off triple in the tenth inning, plating Victor Martinez to give the Tigers a 2–1 victory over Tampa Bay. The victory helped the Tigers (36–30) remain in a virtual tie with the slumping Indians (35–29) for the AL Central lead.
- June 14: In a showdown of division leaders, Justin Verlander struck out 12 Cleveland Indians hitters and took a no-hitter into the eighth inning before surrendering a single to Orlando Cabrera. Verlander completed the game for a two-hit 4–0 shutout, and the Tigers took sole possession of first place in the AL Central for the first time all year. Detroit had 11 hits, all singles, which snapped a 66-game streak from the start of the season in which they had at least one extra-base hit in every game.
- June 19: Pitching his second straight complete game, Justin Verlander helped the Tigers to a 9–1 victory to salvage one game of an interleague series against the Colorado Rockies. Verlander (9–3) won his seventh straight decision after starting the season 2–3.
- June 22: Austin Jackson, who had entered the game as a defensive replacement, made a game-saving over-the-shoulder catch with the bases loaded in the bottom of the ninth to preserve a 7–5 interleague victory over the Los Angeles Dodgers. The catch also allowed closer José Valverde to remain perfect in save situations, converting his 17th straight.
- June 25: While he did not flirt with a no-hitter, Justin Verlander was again masterful, striking out a career-high 14 batters in a 6–0 romp versus the visiting Arizona Diamondbacks.
- June 26: With Kirk Gibson and Alan Trammell in the visiting dugout as members of the Arizona Diamondbacks staff, the Tigers finally retired Sparky Anderson's number 11 in a pre-game ceremony. Gibson and Trammell starred for the Tigers' 1984 World Series winning team, which was managed by Anderson. Detroit went on to beat Arizona, 8–3, thanks to seven runs in the bottom of the eighth inning.
- June 27: Making up a rain-out at home versus the Blue Jays, the Tigers won 4–2 thanks to a tie-breaking triple in the bottom of the eighth from Jhonny Peralta.
- June 30: Justin Verlander again played stopper in a 5–2 victory over the visiting New York Mets. The Mets had pounded out 38 hits and 30 runs in the first two games of the series before Verlander tamed them on 7 hits. After a 16–12 June, the Tigers (44–38) found themselves 1.5 games up on the Indians in the AL Central.
- July 2: The only notable achievement in a 15–3 blowout loss to the San Francisco Giants was Tigers utilityman Don Kelly replacing catcher Victor Martinez in the third inning. The appearance gave Kelly, who had pitched one-third of an inning three days prior against the Mets, the distinction of playing all nine positions in his career.
- July 3: In a day of mixed emotions, Alex Avila was informed that he had won the fan voting as the starting catcher for the AL in the All-Star Game and the Tigers defeated the Giants, 6–3. Immediately after the game, however, the Tigers front office announced the firing of pitching coach Rick Knapp. Knapp would be replaced by bullpen coach Jeff Jones for the remainder of the season.
- July 5: Despite allowing only one run, Justin Verlander saw his 9-game winning streak end against Dan Haren and the Los Angeles Angels of Anaheim in a classic 1–0 pitcher's duel.
- July 8: José Valverde saved a Tiger victory for the third time in three nights in a 6–4 victory over the Royals, running his consecutive saves streak to 23.
- July 10: Justin Verlander collected his 12th win on the season, 2–1 over the Royals, as the Tigers headed to the All-Star Break 1.5 games in front of the Cleveland Indians in the Central Division.
- July 17: Carlos Guillén, recently recalled off the disabled list, hit a tie-breaking single in a three-run eighth inning to help the Tigers to a 4–3 win, avoiding a series sweep against the visiting White Sox.
- July 20: Following the Tigers' acquisition of 3B Wilson Betemit for two minor leaguers, long-time Tiger Brandon Inge was designated for assignment at Triple-A Toledo shortly after the Tigers dropped a 7–5 decision to the Oakland A's. Inge was hitting just .177 at the time and was out of minor league options, but chose to accept the assignment.
- July 30: Top Tigers prospect Jacob Turner was called up from Double-A and made his major league debut, surrendering two runs in 5.2 innings. But the Tigers went on to lose to the Angels, 5–1. After the game, the Tigers announced they had acquired starter Doug Fister and reliever David Pauley in a trade with the Seattle Mariners for Casper Wells, Charlie Furbush and two minor leaguers.
- July 31: In a battle of the top two candidates for the AL Cy Young Award, Justin Verlander outdueled Angels' starter Jered Weaver for a 3–2 Tigers victory. Verlander again carried a no-hitter late into the game, ultimately losing the no-hitter and shutout with two out in the eighth after surrendering an RBI single to Maicer Izturis, but persevered for his 15th win of the season. Magglio Ordóñez hit a two-run homer off Weaver in the third inning and stayed near the plate to see if the ball stayed fair. Weaver took it as an attempt to show him up, and jawed at Ordonez in his next at-bat. When Carlos Guillén homered off Weaver later in the game, he danced down the first-base line and stared toward the mound. Weaver threw the next pitch over Alex Avila's head and was ejected from the game. The Tigers (57–51) finished July 13–13, but maintained a 3-game lead over the Indians.
- August 2: After reliever Joaquín Benoit blew a 5–2 lead in the top of the eighth against the Texas Rangers, Brennan Boesch hit a solo homer in the bottom of the inning to give the Tigers a 6–5 lead they would hold onto with the help of José Valverde's 29th straight save conversion.
- August 3: Newly acquired Doug Fister won his Tiger debut, surrendering three runs (two earned) in seven innings of a 5–4 victory over the Rangers.
- August 5: Brennan Boesch hit a go-ahead RBI single in the top of the tenth inning to give the Tigers a 4–3 victory at Kansas City.
- August 6: Verlander tied the Yankees' CC Sabathia for the major league lead in wins with his 16th, as the Tigers again defeated Kansas City, 4–3. The game was highlighted by Austin Jackson's spectacular leaping grab over the center field wall to rob Alex Gordon of a lead-off home run on Verlander's first pitch of the game. José Valverde converted his 32nd consecutive save of the season, matching the streak that Willie Hernández achieved for the Tigers in 1984.
- August 11: Justin Verlander's 17th win of the season helped the Tigers salvage the third game of a series at Cleveland, regaining a 3-game lead over the second place Indians. The 4–3 victory was also the 100th win of Verlander's career.
- August 13: The Tigers erased a 5–1 deficit against the Baltimore Orioles with a 5-run sixth inning that featured six consecutive hits, and the 6–5 lead held up for the final score.
- August 15: Upon arriving in Detroit on the Minnesota Twins' team plane, outfielder Delmon Young was told he had just been traded to the Tigers for two minor leaguers. Suiting up for the other side, Young hit a home run in his Tiger debut, but he was upstaged by former teammate Jim Thome, who hit career home runs #599 and #600 in a 9–6 win for the Twins.
- August 20: In his first at-bat since rejoining the Tigers from the minor leagues, Brandon Inge hit a two-run homer and the Tigers drubbed the Indians, 10–1.
- August 21: Detroit completed a sweep of the Indians in dramatic fashion. With an 8–7 lead and José Valverde's consecutive saves streak on the line, center fielder Austin Jackson gunned down Cleveland's Kosuke Fukudome at the plate on a would-be sacrifice fly for the final out of the game.
- August 27: In his first game back in Minnesota after being traded to Detroit, Delmon Young collected three hits and three RBIs in an 8–1 Tigers victory.
- August 28: Delmon Young again victimized his former team with a go-ahead single in the seventh inning, handing Justin Verlander his 20th win of the season and ninth straight decision. The victory made Verlander the Tigers' first 20-game winner since Bill Gullickson in 1991, and the first major leaguer to win 20 before the end of August since Curt Schilling in 2002.
- August 30: Ramon Santiago hit just his fourth home run of the season, but it was a big one – a walk-off solo shot in the bottom of the tenth that gave the Tigers a 2–1 victory over the Royals.
- August 31: Against his former team, Wilson Betemit hit a two-run double in a three-run eighth inning for the Tigers that provided the final margin in a 5–4 victory over Kansas City. José Valverde ran his consecutive saves streak to 40 and the Tigers (75–61) completed an 18–10 August.
- September 2: Justin Verlander stifled the Chicago White Sox in an 8–1 win for his 21st of the season, and Jim Leyland became just the fifth manager in 111 years of Tiger baseball to manage 500 wins with the team. The other four are Sparky Anderson (1,331), Hughie Jennings (1,131), Bucky Harris (516) and Steve O'Neill (509).
- September 3: Trailing 8–1 after the Chicago White Sox scored two runs in the top of the fifth inning, the Tigers mounted an improbable comeback. Scoring three runs in the bottom of the frame, followed by single runs in the seventh and eighth innings—which were also delayed by rain. Detroit still trailed 8–6 in the ninth with Sox closer Sergio Santos on the mound. Ryan Raburn tied the game with a one-out two-run home run. Two batters later, Cabrera hit Santos' first pitch out for an unthinkable 9–8 win.
- September 4: The Tigers continued their assault on White Sox pitchers that started the night before, hammering 24 hits in an 18–2 rout. Max Scherzer tossed seven scoreless innings for his 14th win of the season.
- September 5: Doug Fister struck out a career-high 13 batters as the Tigers opened an important three-game series in Cleveland with a 4–2 win.
- September 7: The Tigers, who went into Cleveland up 6.5 games in the AL Central, ended any thoughts of a collapse by completing a series sweep with an 8–6 win. Justin Verlander struggled at times, but still picked up win #22.
- September 9: Detroit's seventh straight win, an 8–4 decision over Minnesota, scoring 8 unanswered runs after trailing 4–0 after the top of the 1st, was tempered by the team officially placing outfielder Brennan Boesch on the disabled list with a torn thumb ligament, and declaring that he would not be able to return for the postseason. Boesch was hitting .283 with 16 home runs.
- September 10: Brandon Inge hit his second walk-off home run of the season in a 3–2 victory over the Twins, running the Tigers winning streak to eight games.
- September 11: Fister upped his record to 5–1 with the Tigers, shutting out the Twins on three hits over seven innings. José Valverde allowed a run in the ninth, but still set the Tigers record with his 43rd save of the season. Todd Jones had previously held the team record with 42 saves in 2000.
- September 13: Verlander ran his record to 23–5 on the season, and combined with relievers Joaquín Benoit and Valverde to shut out the White Sox, 5–0 in Chicago. The win was the Tigers 11th straight, matching the team's longest streak since 1968.
- September 14: Carlos Guillén singled home Will Rhymes in the top of the 10th inning, and Valverde struck out the side to convert his 44th consecutive save in a 6–5 Tigers win over the White Sox—Detroit's 12th straight. It was the longest Tigers winning streak since the 1934 team won 14 straight.
- September 15: Oakland ended the Tigers winning streak with a 6–1 victory. Leyland stated after the game that he had not changed his underwear during the Tigers 12-game winning streak.
- September 16: With a 3–1 win in Oakland, the Tigers clinched their first division title since 1987—and first ever AL Central title. Fister pitched 8 strong innings, retiring 17 straight batters at one point, and Valverde finished with his 45th consecutive save.
- September 18: Verlander shut out the A's over eight innings for his 24th win, the most by an American League pitcher since Bob Welch won 25 in 1990 and the most by a Major League pitcher since Randy Johnson in 2002.
- September 23: Detroit beat Baltimore, 4–3, on an 11th-inning walk-off RBI double by Victor Martinez. Miguel Cabrera collected his 100th RBI in the game, giving him eight straight seasons with at least 100 RBIs. It also made Cabrera the first Tiger since Norm Cash and Rocky Colavito in 1961 to reach triple digits in RBIs, runs and walks.
- September 24: In his final start of the season, Justin Verlander surrendered five runs to the Orioles in a no-decision, failing to become the first major league pitcher since Welch to win at least 25 games.
- September 25: In a 10–6 win over the Orioles, Victor Martinez joined Miguel Cabrera in the 100 RBI club with a 3-run homer that gave him 101 on the season.
- September 26: Doug Fister tossed 8 shutout innings as the Tigers clobbered Cleveland, 14–0. Miguel Cabrera went 3-for-4 to up his AL-leading batting average to .343.
- September 28: Miguel Cabrera went 2-for-4 on the final day of the season to raise his batting average to .344 and lock up the AL batting title. Jhonny Peralta hit his 21st home run of the season to break a 4–4 tie. José Valverde preserved the 5–4 lead over the Indians with his 49th straight save, completing his perfect season.

After a remarkable September where the team went 20–6, and winning 38 of their last 54 games over the season's final two months, the Tigers finished the regular season with a 95–67 record—winning the AL Central by an astounding 15 games—and clinching the #3 seed in the American League playoffs. It would be Detroit's first postseason appearance since 2006.

== Individual accomplishments ==
=== Justin Verlander ===
Ace starting pitcher Justin Verlander had the best season of his career. On May 7, Verlander took a perfect game against the Toronto Blue Jays into the 8th inning, and after a walk to J. P. Arencibia, Verlander got his double play and went on to the 9th inning to complete his second career no-hitter. It was the seventh no-hitter in Tigers history. He faced the minimum 27 batters and recorded four strikeouts with one walk and a pitch count of 108. Verlander became the second Tigers pitcher since Virgil Trucks, and the thirtieth pitcher in the history of baseball, to throw multiple no-hitters.

Verlander also won the 100th game of his career and became the first Tiger pitcher to win 20 games in a season since Bill Gullickson in 1991. Verlander's regular season total of 24 wins is the highest for a Tiger pitcher since Mickey Lolich won 25 in 1971.

Verlander finished the season by winning the AL pitching Triple Crown, leading the American League in wins (24), ERA (2.40) and strikeouts (250). On November 15, Verlander was named the AL Cy Young Award winner in a unanimous vote. On November 21, it was announced that Verlander had also won the American League MVP Award in a much closer vote.

=== José Valverde ===
2011 was also a career best season for closer José Valverde. On September 11, he recorded his 43rd consecutive save of the season, passing Todd Jones as the Tigers' all-time single season saves leader. His 45th save of the season helped the Tigers clinch the AL Central title. On the final day of the regular season, he recorded his 49th straight save, completing his perfect season. He recorded 2 saves against the New York Yankees in the ALDS, the second of which sent the Tigers to the ALCS. He saved one of the Tigers' two ALCS wins. He also won the 2011 Delivery Man of the Year Award and the 2011 AL Rolaids Relief Man of the Year Award. Valverde finished fifth in the 2011 AL Cy Young Award voting, which was won by teammate Justin Verlander.

=== Miguel Cabrera ===
With his Major League-best .344 batting average, Miguel Cabrera won the AL Batting Championship. Cabrera became the first Tiger since Norm Cash and Rocky Colavito in 1961 to reach triple-digits in RBIs (105), runs (111) and walks (108). He also led the AL in on-base percentage (.448) and doubles (48). Miguel finished fifth in the voting for the AL MVP Award, which was won by teammate Justin Verlander. He also won the Luis Aparicio Award, an award given to the best Venezuelan player each year.

=== Alex Avila ===
Catcher Alex Avila had the best season of his young career, hitting .295 with 19 home runs and 82 RBIs. He started in the 2011 MLB All Star game and won the Silver Slugger Award for catchers.

=== Don Kelly ===
Super utility-man Don Kelly made his career debut as a pitcher on June 29, pitching one-third of an inning in a blowout loss to the New York Mets. Three days later, he made his major league debut at catcher, when he relieved Victor Martinez in the fourth inning against the San Francisco Giants. This gave Kelly the rare distinction of playing all nine defensive positions in his major league career.

== Results ==
=== Season standings ===
==== American League Central ====
AL Central
Team	W	L	Pct.	GB	Home	Road
Detroit Tigers	95	67	.586	—	50‍–‍31	45‍–‍36
Cleveland Indians	80	82	.494	15	44‍–‍37	36‍–‍45
Chicago White Sox	79	83	.488	16	36‍–‍45	43‍–‍38
Kansas City Royals	71	91	.438	24	40‍–‍41	31‍–‍50
Minnesota Twins	63	99	.389	32	33‍–‍48	30‍–‍51

==== American League Wild Card ====
Division winners
Team	W	L	Pct.
New York Yankees	97	65	.599
Texas Rangers	96	66	.593
Detroit Tigers	95	67	.586

Wild Card team (Top team qualifies for postseason)
Team	W	L	Pct.	GB
Tampa Bay Rays	91	71	.562	—
Boston Red Sox	90	72	.556	1
Los Angeles Angels of Anaheim	86	76	.531	5
Toronto Blue Jays	81	81	.500	10
Cleveland Indians	80	82	.494	11
Chicago White Sox	79	83	.488	12
Oakland Athletics	74	88	.457	17
Kansas City Royals	71	91	.438	20
Baltimore Orioles	69	93	.426	22
Seattle Mariners	67	95	.414	24
Minnesota Twins	63	99	.389	28

=== Game log ===
Legend
Tigers win	Tigers loss	Game postponed

==== Regular season ====
2011 Game Log
March (0–1)

#	Date	Opponent	Score	Win	Loss	Save	Crowd	Record
1	March 31	@ Yankees	L 6–3	Chamberlain (1–0)	Coke (0–1)	Rivera (1)	48,226	0–1

April (12–14)

#	Date	Opponent	Score	Win	Loss	Save	Crowd	Record
2	April 2	@ Yankees	L 10–6	Burnett (1–0)	Penny (0–1)	Rivera (2)	41,462	0–2
3	April 3	@ Yankees	W 10–7	Scherzer (1–0)	Hughes (0–1)	Valverde (1)	40,574	1–2
4	April 4	@ Orioles	L 5–1	Arrieta (1–0)	Porcello (0–1)		46,593	1–3
5	April 6	@ Orioles	W 7–3	Verlander (1–0)	Bergesen (0–1)		12,451	2–3
6	April 7	@ Orioles	L 9–5	Johnson (1–0)	Thomas (0–1)		11,648	2–4
7	April 8	Royals	W 5–2	Scherzer (2–0)	Davies (0–1)	Valverde (2)	44,799	3–4
8	April 9	Royals	L 3–1	Chen (1–0)	Coke (0–2)	Soria (2)	33,810	3–5
9	April 10	Royals	L 9–5	Hochevar (1–1)	Porcello (0–2)	Soria (3)	28,984	3–6
10	April 11	Rangers	L 2–0	Ogando (2–0)	Verlander (1–1)	Feliz (4)	18,724	3–7
11	April 12	Rangers	W 5–4	Valverde (1–0)	O'Day (0–1)		20,609	4–7
12	April 13	Rangers	W 3–2	Valverde (2–0)	Oliver (1–1)		20,526	5–7
13	April 14	@ Athletics	W 3–0	Coke (1–2)	Ross (1–1)	Valverde (3)	11,129	6–7
14	April 15	@ Athletics	W 8–4 (10)	Villarreal (1–0)	Fuentes (0–2)		21,853	7–7
15	April 16	@ Athletics	L 6–2	Braden (1–1)	Verlander (1–2)		16,265	7–8
16	April 17	@ Athletics	L 5–1	Cahill (2–0)	Penny (0–2)		16,460	7–9
17	April 18	@ Mariners	W 8–3	Scherzer (3–0)	Lueke (1–1)		12,774	8–9
18	April 19	@ Mariners	L 13–3	Fister (1–3)	Coke (1–3)		12,411	8–10
19	April 20	@ Mariners	W 3–2	Porcello (1–2)	Bédard (0–4)	Valverde (4)	13,339	9–10
20	April 22	White Sox	W 9–3	Verlander (2–2)	Buehrle (1–2)		23,537	10–10
21	April 23	White Sox	W 9–0	Penny (1–2)	Jackson (2–2)		35,227	11–10
22	April 24	White Sox	W 3–0	Scherzer (4–0)	Danks (0–3)	Valverde (5)	17,784	12–10
23	April 26	Mariners	L 7–3	Hernández (3–2)	Coke (1–4)		18,027	12–11
24	April 27	Mariners	L 10–1	Bédard (1–4)	Verlander (2–3)		18,153	12–12
25	April 28	Mariners	L 7–2	Pineda (4–2)	Penny (1–3)		21,176	12–13
26	April 29	@ Indians	L 9–5	Perez (1–1)	Benoit (0–1)		15,568	12–14
27	April 30	@ Indians	L 3–2 (13)	Sipp (1–0)	Villarreal (1–1)		26,433	12–15

May (16–11)

#	Date	Opponent	Score	Win	Loss	Save	Crowd	Record
28	May 1	@ Indians	L 5–4	Durbin (1–1)	Benoit (0–2)	Perez (7)	14,164	12–16
29	May 2	Yankees	L 5–3	Chamberlain (2–0)	Valverde (2–1)	Rivera (11)	22,852	12–17
30	May 3	Yankees	W 4–2	Penny (2–3)	Sabathia (2–2)	Valverde (6)	23,551	13–17
31	May 4	Yankees	W 4–0	Scherzer (5–0)	García (1–2)		22,569	14–17
32	May 5	Yankees	W 6–3	Porcello (2–2)	Burnett (4–2)		30,572	15–17
33	May 6	@ Blue Jays	L 7–4	Litsch (3–2)	Coke (1–5)	Francisco (2)	19,711	15–18
34	May 7	@ Blue Jays	W 9–0	Verlander (3–3)	Romero (2–4)		23,453	16–18
35	May 8	@ Blue Jays	W 5–2	Penny (3–3)	Reyes (0–3)	Valverde (7)	17,392	17–18
36	May 9	@ Blue Jays	W 10–5	Scherzer (6–0)	Morrow (1–2)		11,785	18–18
37	May 10	@ Twins	W 10–2	Porcello (3–2)	Liriano (2–5)		38,949	19–18
38	May 11	@ Twins	W 9–7	Benoit (1–2)	Capps (1–2)	Valverde (8)	38,938	20–18
39	May 13	Royals	W 3–1	Verlander (4–3)	Hochevar (3–4)	Valverde (9)	33,641	21–18
40	May 14	Royals	W 3–0	Penny (4–3)	Francis (0–5)	Valverde (10)	37,647	22–18
–	May 15	Royals	Postponed (rain) – rescheduled for September 1.					
41	May 16	Blue Jays	L 4–2	Drabek (3–2)	Benoit (1–3)	Francisco (4)	20,444	22–19
–	May 17	Blue Jays	Postponed (rain) – rescheduled for June 27.					
42	May 18	@ Red Sox	L 1–0	Bard (1–3)	Schlereth (0–1)	Papelbon (8)	37,311	22–20
43	May 19	@ Red Sox	L 4–3	Papelbon (2–0)	Alburquerque (0–1)		37,660	22–21
44	May 20	@ Pirates	L 10–1	Karstens (3–2)	Penny (4–4)		24,396	22–22
45	May 21	@ Pirates	L 6–2	Correia (6–4)	Scherzer (6–1)	Hanrahan (13)	37,958	22–23
46	May 22	@ Pirates	W 2–0	Porcello (4–2)	Maholm (1–7)	Valverde (11)	25,124	23–23
47	May 23	Rays	W 6–3	Furbush (1–0)	Hellickson (5–3)		21,550	24–23
48	May 24	Rays	W 7–6	Alburquerque (1–1)	Ramos (0–1)	Benoit (1)	24,133	25–23
–	May 25	Rays	Postponed (rain) – rescheduled for June 13.					
49	May 26	Red Sox	L 14–1 (8)	Aceves (2–0)	Scherzer (6–2)		24,213	25–24
50	May 27	Red Sox	L 6–3	Wakefield (2–1)	Porcello (4–3)		34,046	25–25
–	May 28	Red Sox	Postponed (rain) – rescheduled for May 29.					
51	May 29	Red Sox	L 4–3	Albers (1–2)	Valverde (2–2)	Papelbon (8)	36,285	25–26
52	May 29	Red Sox	W 3–0	Verlander (5–3)	Beckett (4–2)	Valverde (12)	39,873	26–26
53	May 30	Twins	W 6–5	Alburquerque (2–1)	Burnett (1–4)	Valverde (13)	30,198	27–26
54	May 31	Twins	W 8–7	Alburquerque (3–1)	Dumatrait (0–1)	Benoit (2)	22,649	28–26

June (16–12)

#	Date	Opponent	Score	Win	Loss	Save	Crowd	Record
55	June 1	Twins	W 4–2	Porcello (5–3)	Baker (2–4)	Valverde (14)	24,363	29–26
56	June 3	@ White Sox	L 6–4	Buehrle (5–4)	Oliver (0–1)	Santos (10)	23,095	29–27
57	June 4	@ White Sox	W 4–2	Verlander (6–3)	Crain (2–2)	Valverde (15)	31,037	30–27
58	June 5	@ White Sox	W 7–3	Penny (5–4)	Peavy (2–1)		25,149	31–27
59	June 6	@ Rangers	W 13–7	Scherzer (7–2)	Lewis (5–6)		33,921	32–27
60	June 7	@ Rangers	W 8–1	Porcello (6–3)	Harrison (5–5)		35,165	33–27
61	June 8	@ Rangers	L 7–3	Ogando (7–0)	Coke (1–6)		40,388	33–28
62	June 9	Mariners	W 4–1	Verlander (7–3)	Fister (3–7)	Valverde (16)	22,090	34–28
63	June 10	Mariners	L 3–2	Ray (3–1)	Penny (5–5)	League (18)	30,511	34–29
64	June 11	Mariners	W 8–1	Scherzer (8–2)	Pineda (6–4)		38,398	35–29
65	June 12	Mariners	L 7–3	Hernández (7–5)	Porcello (6–4)		31,572	35–30
66	June 13	Rays	W 2–1 (10)	Purcey (1–0)	Farnsworth (0–1)		30,938	36–30
67	June 14	Indians	W 4–0	Verlander (8–3)	Masterson (5–5)		28,128	37–30
68	June 15	Indians	L 6–4	Carmona (4–8)	Furbush (1–1)	Perez (17)	26,711	37–31
69	June 16	Indians	W 6–2	Scherzer (9–2)	Talbot (2–4)		37,437	38–31
70	June 17	@ Rockies	L 13–6	Hammel (4–6)	Porcello (6–5)		41,594	38–32
71	June 18	@ Rockies	L 5–4	Jiménez (2–7)	Coke (1–7)	Street (20)	48,555	38–33
72	June 19	@ Rockies	W 9–1	Verlander (9–3)	Cook (0–2)		49,015	39–33
73	June 20	@ Dodgers	L 4–0	Kershaw (7–3)	Penny (5–6)		29,355	39–34
74	June 21	@ Dodgers	L 6–1	Billingsley (6–6)	Scherzer (9–3)		37,769	39–35
75	June 22	@ Dodgers	W 7–5	Alburquerque (4–1)	Lilly (5–7)	Valverde (17)	30,332	40–35
76	June 24	Diamondbacks	L 7–6	Vásquez (1–1)	Purcey (1–1)	Putz (21)	37,335	40–36
77	June 25	Diamondbacks	W 6–0	Verlander (10–3)	Collmenter (4–4)		43,163	41–36
78	June 26	Diamondbacks	W 8–3	Alburquerque (5–1)	Heilman (4–1)		41,036	42–36
79	June 27	Blue Jays	W 4–2	Benoit (2–3)	Rzepczynski (2–2)	Valverde (18)	25,181	43–36
80	June 28	Mets	L 14–3	Dickey (4–7)	Porcello (6–6)		28,480	43–37
81	June 29	Mets	L 16–9	Capuano (7–7)	Coke (1–8)		26,338	43–38
82	June 30	Mets	W 5–2	Verlander (11–3)	Pelfrey (4–7)	Valverde (19)	31,861	44–38

July (13–13)

#	Date	Opponent	Score	Win	Loss	Save	Crowd	Record
83	July 1	Giants	L 4–3	Wilson (6–1)	Valverde (2–3)	Affeldt (3)	35,583	44–39
84	July 2	Giants	L 15–3	Zito (2–1)	Scherzer (9–4)	Mota (1)	38,983	44–40
85	July 3	Giants	W 6–3	Porcello (7–6)	Affeldt (1–2)	Valverde (20)	31,904	45–40
86	July 4	@ Angels	L 5–1	Piñeiro (4–3)	Furbush (1–2)		43,012	45–41
87	July 5	@ Angels	L 1–0	Haren (9–5)	Verlander (11–4)		39,006	45–42
88	July 6	@ Angels	W 5–4	Penny (6–6)	Takahashi (2–2)	Valverde (21)	31,549	46–42
89	July 7	@ Royals	W 3–1	Scherzer (10–4)	Duffy (1–4)	Valverde (22)	16,355	47–42
90	July 8	@ Royals	W 6–4	Porcello (8–6)	Davies (1–8)	Valverde (23)	34,563	48–42
91	July 9	@ Royals	L 13–6	Holland (3–1)	Furbush (1–3)	Teaford (1)	25,941	48–43
92	July 10	@ Royals	W 2–1	Verlander (12–4)	Francis (3–10)	Valverde (24)	18,373	49–43
93	July 15	White Sox	L 8–2	Floyd (7–9)	Verlander (12–5)		43,593	49–44
94	July 16	White Sox	L 5–0	Jackson (6–7)	Scherzer (10–5)		49,984	49–45
95	July 17	White Sox	W 4–3	Penny (7–6)	Humber (8–6)	Valverde (25)	37,049	50–45
96	July 19	Athletics	W 8–3	Porcello (9–6)	Moscoso (3–5)		31,980	51–45
97	July 20	Athletics	L 7–5	Devine (1–1)	Purcey (1–2)	Bailey (10)	31,975	51–46
98	July 21	@ Twins	W 6–2	Verlander (13–5)	Pavano (6–7)		40,149	52–46
99	July 22	@ Twins	W 8–2	Scherzer (11–5)	Duensing (7–8)		40,691	53–46
100	July 23	@ Twins	L 4–1	Baker (8–5)	Penny (7–7)	Nathan (7)	40,764	53–47
101	July 24	@ Twins	W 5–2	Porcello (10–6)	Liriano (6–8)	Valverde (26)	40,789	54–47
102	July 25	@ White Sox	L 6–3	Buehrle (8–5)	Below (0–1)		37,110	54–48
103	July 26	@ White Sox	W 5–4	Verlander (14–5)	Ohman (0–2)	Valverde (27)	28,093	55–48
104	July 27	@ White Sox	L 2–1	Danks (4–8)	Scherzer (11–6)	Santos (21)	26,978	55–49
105	July 28	Angels	L 12–7	Cassevah (1–0)	Penny (7–8)		33,489	55–50
106	July 29	Angels	W 12–2	Porcello (11–6)	Chatwood (6–7)		40,551	56–50
107	July 30	Angels	L 5–1	Haren (11–6)	Turner (0–1)		40,753	56–51
108	July 31	Angels	W 3–2	Verlander (15–5)	Weaver (14–5)	Valverde (28)	36,878	57–51

August (18–10)

#	Date	Opponent	Score	Win	Loss	Save	Crowd	Record
109	August 2	Rangers	W 6–5	Benoit (3–3)	Adams (3–2)	Valverde (29)	29,067	58–51
110	August 3	Rangers	W 5–4	Fister (4–12)	Harrison (9–8)	Valverde (30)	33,596	59–51
111	August 4	Rangers	L 5–2	Ogando (11–5)	Penny (7–9)	Feliz (22)	40,497	59–52
112	August 5	@ Royals	W 4–3 (10)	Schlereth (1–1)	Crow (3–3)	Valverde (31)	28,565	60–52
113	August 6	@ Royals	W 4–3	Verlander (16–5)	Duffy (3–5)	Valverde (32)	25,818	61–52
114	August 7	@ Royals	L 4–3	Chen (6–5)	Scherzer (11–7)	Soria (21)	20,132	61–53
115	August 9	@ Indians	L 3–2 (14)	Herrmann (3–0)	Pauley (5–5)		25,317	61–54
116	August 10	@ Indians	L 10–3	Jiménez (7–9)	Porcello (11–7)		23,258	61–55
117	August 11	@ Indians	W 4–3	Verlander (17–5)	Carmona (5–12)	Valverde (33)	30,988	62–55
118	August 12	@ Orioles	W 5–4	Penny (8–9)	Patton (0–1)	Valverde (34)	21,465	63–55
119	August 13	@ Orioles	W 6–5	Scherzer (12–7)	Guthrie (5–16)	Valverde (35)	24,114	64–55
120	August 14	@ Orioles	L 8–5	Reyes (6–9)	Fister (4–13)	Johnson (2)	18,348	64–56
121	August 15	Twins	L 9–6	Liriano (8–9)	Porcello (11–8)	Nathan (10)	36,211	64–57
122	August 16	Twins	W 7–1	Verlander (18–5)	Blackburn (6–10)		40,589	65–57
123	August 17	Twins	L 6–5	Capps (4–6)	Valverde (2–4)	Nathan (11)	34,835	65–58
124	August 19	Indians	W 4–1	Scherzer (13–7)	Tomlin (12–6)	Valverde (36)	44,222	66–58
125	August 20	Indians	W 10–1	Fister (5–13)	Huff (1–2)		44,629	67–58
126	August 21	Indians	W 8–7	Coke (2–8)	Jiménez (7–10)	Valverde (37)	43,388	68–58
127	August 22	@ Rays	W 5–2	Verlander (19–5)	Niemann (8–5)		13,048	69–58
128	August 23	@ Rays	W 2–1	Penny (9–9)	Price (11–11)	Coke (1)	11,475	70–58
129	August 24	@ Rays	L 3–2 (10)	Peralta (3–4)	Below (0–2)		13,910	70–59
130	August 25	@ Rays	W 2–0	Fister (6–13)	Hellickson (11–9)	Valverde (38)	14,069	71–59
131	August 26	@ Twins	W 8–1	Porcello (12–8)	Diamond (0–2)		38,918	72–59
132	August 27	@ Twins	W 6–4	Verlander (20–5)	Pavano (6–11)	Valverde (39)	40,179	73–59
133	August 28	@ Twins	L 11–4	Duensing (9–13)	Penny (9–10)		39,130	73–60
134	August 29	Royals	L 9–5	Hochevar (9–10)	Scherzer (13–8)	Wood (1)	32,423	73–61
135	August 30	Royals	W 2–1 (10)	Benoit (4–3)	Crow (3–4)		34,866	74–61
136	August 31	Royals	W 5–4	Schlereth (2–1)	Wood (5–2)	Valverde (40)	33,572	75–61

September (20–6)

#	Date	Opponent	Score	Win	Loss	Save	Crowd	Record
137	September 1	Royals	L 11–8	Crow (4–4)	Coke (2–9)	Soria (25)	39,084	75–62
138	September 2	White Sox	W 8–1	Verlander (21–5)	Danks (6–10)		42,352	76–62
139	September 3	White Sox	W 9–8	Marte (1–0)	Santos (3–4)		40,635	77–62
140	September 4	White Sox	W 18–2	Scherzer (14–8)	Buehrle (11–7)		42,671	78–62
141	September 5	@ Indians	W 4–2	Fister (7–13)	Jiménez (8–11)	Valverde (41)	39,824	79–62
142	September 6	@ Indians	W 10–1	Porcello (13–8)	Carmona (6–14)		27,544	80–62
143	September 7	@ Indians	W 8–6	Verlander (22–5)	Masterson (11–9)	Valverde (42)	16,783	81–62
144	September 9	Twins	W 8–4	Penny (10–10)	Slowey (0–5)		35,996	82–62
145	September 10	Twins	W 3–2	Alburquerque (6–1)	Perkins (4–4)		38,567	83–62
146	September 11	Twins	W 2–1	Fister (8–13)	Diamond (1–4)	Valverde (43)	36,972	84–62
147	September 12	@ White Sox	W 14–4	Porcello (14–8)	Danks (6–12)		22,750	85–62
148	September 13	@ White Sox	W 5–0	Verlander (23–5)	Floyd (12–11)		25,015	86–62
149	September 14	@ White Sox	W 6–5 (10)	Coke (3–9)	Santos (4–5)	Valverde (44)	19,010	87–62
150	September 15	@ Athletics	L 6–1	McCarthy (9–8)	Scherzer (14–9)		10,925	87–63
151	September 16	@ Athletics	W 3–1	Fister (9–13)	Cahill (11–14)	Valverde (45)	31,022	88–63
152	September 17	@ Athletics	L 5–3	Gonzalez (14–12)	Porcello (14–9)		19,451	88–64
153	September 18	@ Athletics	W 3–0	Verlander (24–5)	Moscoso (8–9)	Valverde (46)	18,405	89–64
154	September 20	@ Royals	L 10–2	Mendoza (1–0)	Penny (10–11)		26,953	89–65
155	September 21	@ Royals	W 6–3	Fister (10–13)	Herrera (0–1)	Valverde (47)	28,776	90–65
156	September 22	Orioles	L 6–5	Britton (11–10)	Pauley (5–6)	Gregg (21)	27,847	90–66
157	September 23	Orioles	W 4–3 (11)	Perry (1–0)	Eyre (2–2)		38,623	91–66
158	September 24	Orioles	L 6–5	Strop (2–1)	Schlereth (2–2)	Gregg (22)	44,846	91–67
159	September 25	Orioles	W 10–6	Penny (11–11)	Matusz (1–9)		41,051	92–67
160	September 26	Indians	W 14–0	Fister (11–13)	Jiménez (10–13)		29,886	93–67
161	September 27	Indians	W 9–6	Scherzer (15–9)	Gómez (5–3)	Valverde (48)	31,132	94–67
162	September 28	Indians	W 5–4	Perry (2–0)	Pestano (1–2)	Valverde (49)	31,645	95–67

==== Postseason ====
===== American League Division Series =====
American League Division Series vs New York Yankees (Tigers win the series 3–2)

#	Date	Opponent	Score	Win	Loss	Save	Crowd	Record
1	September 30	@ Yankees	Suspended (rain) – postponed to October 1.					
1	October 1	@ Yankees	L 9–3	Nova (1–0)	Fister (0–1)		50,940	0–1
2	October 2	@ Yankees	W 5–3	Scherzer (1–0)	García (0–1)		50,596	1–1
3	October 3	Yankees	W 5–4	Verlander (1–0)	Soriano (0–1)	Valverde (1)	43,581	2–1
4	October 4	Yankees	L 10–1	Burnett (1–0)	Porcello (0–1)		43,527	2–2
5	October 6	@ Yankees	W 3–2	Fister (1–1)	Nova (1–1)	Valverde (2)	50,940	3–2

===== American League Championship Series =====
American League Championship Series vs Texas Rangers (Rangers win the series 4–2)

#	Date	Opponent	Score	Win	Loss	Save	Crowd	Record
1	October 8	@ Rangers	L 3–2	Ogando (1–0)	Verlander (0–1)	Feliz (1)	50,114	0–1
–	October 9	@ Rangers	Postponed (rain) – rescheduled to October 10.					
2	October 10	@ Rangers	L 7–3 (11)	Adams (1–0)	Perry (0–1)		51,227	0–2
3	October 11	Rangers	W 5–2	Fister (1–0)	Lewis (0–1)	Valverde (1)	41,905	1–2
4	October 12	Rangers	L 7–3 (11)	Feldman (1–0)	Valverde (0–1)		42,334	1–3
5	October 13	Rangers	W 7–5	Verlander (1–1)	Wilson (0–1)	Coke (1)	41,908	2–3
6	October 15	@ Rangers	L 15–5	Ogando (2–0)	Scherzer (0–1)		51,508	2–4

== Record vs. opponents ==
2011 American League record Source: MLB Standings Grid – 2011
Team	BAL	BOS	CWS	CLE	DET	KC	LAA	MIN	NYY	OAK	SEA	TB	TEX	TOR	NL
Baltimore	–	8–10	4–4	2–5	5–5	5–4	3–6	6–2	5–13	4–5	4–2	9–9	1–5	6–12	7–11
Boston	10–8	–	2–4	4–6	5–1	5–3	6–2	5–2	12–6	6–2	5–4	6–12	4–6	10–8	10–8
Chicago	4–4	4–2	–	11–7	5–13	7–11	2–6	9–9	2–6	6–4	7–2	4–4	4–4	3–4	11–7
Cleveland	5–2	6–4	7–11	–	6–12	12–6	3–6	11–7	3–4	5–2	5–4	2–4	1–9	3–4	11–7
Detroit	5–5	1–5	13–5	12–6	–	11–7	3–4	14–4	4–3	5–5	4–6	6–1	6–3	4–2	7–11
Kansas City	4–5	3–5	11–7	6–12	7–11	–	7–3	8–10	3–3	4–5	5–3	2–5	2–6	4–3	5–13
Los Angeles	6–3	2–6	6–2	6–3	4–3	3–7	–	6–3	4–5	8–11	12–7	4–4	7–12	5–5	13–5
Minnesota	2–6	2–5	9–9	7–11	4–14	10–8	3–6	–	2–6	4–4	3–5	3–7	5–3	1–5	8–10
New York	13–5	6–12	6–2	4–3	3–4	3–3	5–4	6–2	–	6–3	5–4	9–9	7–2	11–7	13–5
Oakland	5–4	2–6	4–6	2–5	5–5	5–4	11–8	4–4	3–6	–	9–10	5–2	6–13	5–5	8–10
Seattle	2–4	4–5	2–7	4–5	6–4	3–5	7–12	5–3	4–5	10–9	–	4–6	4–15	3–6	9–9
Tampa Bay	9–9	12–6	4–4	4–2	1–6	5–2	4–4	7–3	9–9	2–5	6–4	–	4–5	12–6	12–6
Texas	5–1	6–4	4–4	9–1	3–6	6–2	12–7	3–5	2–7	13–6	15–4	5–4	–	4–6	9–9
Toronto	12–6	8–10	4–3	4–3	2–4	3–4	5–5	5–1	7–11	5–5	6–3	6–12	6–4	–	8–10

- Source: MLB Standings Grid – 2011

== Player stats ==
=== Batting ===
Note: G = Games played; AB = At bats; R = Runs scored; H = Hits; 2B = Doubles; 3B = Triples; HR = Home runs; RBI = Runs batted in; AVG = Batting average; SB = Stolen bases

Player	G	AB	R	H	2B	3B	HR	RBI	AVG	SB
Alex Avila	141	464	63	137	33	4	19	82	.295	3
Wilson Betemit	40	120	11	35	7	3	5	19	.292	1
Brennan Boesch	115	428	75	121	25	1	16	54	.283	5
Miguel Cabrera	161	572	111	197	48	0	30	105	.344	2
Andy Dirks	78	219	34	55	13	0	7	28	.251	5
Carlos Guillén	28	95	8	22	2	1	3	13	.232	1
Brandon Inge	102	269	29	53	10	2	3	23	.197	1
Austin Jackson	153	591	90	147	22	11	10	45	.249	22
Don Kelly	112	257	35	63	8	3	7	28	.245	2
Víctor Martínez	145	540	76	178	40	0	12	103	.330	1
Magglio Ordóñez	92	329	33	84	10	0	5	32	.255	2
Jhonny Peralta	146	525	58	157	25	3	21	86	.299	0
Ryan Raburn	121	387	53	99	22	2	14	49	.256	1
Will Rhymes	29	85	13	20	3	0	0	2	.235	1
Ramón Santiago	101	258	29	67	11	3	5	30	.260	0
Omir Santos	11	22	1	5	0	0	0	0	.227	0
Scott Sizemore	17	63	8	14	1	0	0	4	.222	1
Casper Wells	64	113	16	29	10	0	4	12	.257	1
Danny Worth	30	37	6	10	2	0	0	3	.270	0
Delmon Young	40	168	28	46	5	1	8	32	.274	0
Pitcher Totals	162	21	0	1	0	0	0	0	.048	0
Team totals	162	5563	787	1540	297	34	169	750	.277	49

=== Pitching ===
Note: W = Wins; L = Losses; ERA = Earned run average; G = Games pitched; GS = Games started; SV = Saves; IP = Innings pitched; R = Runs allowed; ER = Earned runs allowed; BB = Walks allowed; K = Strikeouts

==== Starters ====
Player	W	L	ERA	G	GS	SV	IP	R	ER	BB	K
Doug Fister	8	1	1.79	11	10	0	70 1/3	19	14	5	57
Brad Penny	11	11	5.30	33	33	0	182 2/3	117	107	62	74
Andrew Oliver *	0	1	6.52	2	2	0	9 2/3	7	7	8	5
Rick Porcello	14	9	4.75	31	31	0	182	103	96	46	104
Max Scherzer	15	9	4.43	31	31	0	195	101	96	56	174
Jacob Turner	0	1	8.53	3	3	0	12 2/3	13	12	4	8
Justin Verlander	24	5	2.40	34	34	0	251	73	67	57	250

==== Bullpen ====
Note: W = Wins; L = Losses; ERA = Earned run average; G = Games pitched; GS = Games started; SV = Saves; IP = Innings pitched; R = Runs allowed; ER = Earned runs allowed; BB = Walks allowed; K = Strikeouts

Player	W	L	ERA	G	GS	SV	IP	R	ER	BB	K
Al Alburquerque	6	1	1.87	41	0	0	43 1/3	9	9	29	67
Duane Below	0	2	4.34	14	2	0	29	16	14	11	14
Joaquín Benoit	4	3	2.95	66	0	2	61	22	20	17	63
Phil Coke	3	9	4.47	48	14	1	108 2/3	64	54	40	69
Charlie Furbush *	1	3	3.62	17	2	0	32 1/3	18	13	14	26
Enrique González *	0	0	10.00	8	0	0	9	10	10	7	3
Don Kelly	0	0	0.00	1	0	0	1/3	0	0	0	0
Luis Marte	1	0	2.45	3	0	0	3 2/3	1	1	1	3
Lester Oliveros *	0	0	5.63	9	0	0	8	5	5	4	4
David Pauley	0	2	5.95	14	0	0	19 2/3	14	13	6	10
Ryan Perry	2	0	5.35	36	0	0	37	25	22	21	24
David Purcey *	1	2	7.23	19	0	0	18 2/3	15	15	20	12
Chance Ruffin *	0	0	4.91	2	0	0	3 2/3	2	2	0	3
Daniel Schlereth	2	2	3.49	49	0	0	49	20	19	31	44
Brad Thomas *	0	1	9.00	12	0	0	11	12	11	6	7
José Valverde	2	4	2.24	75	0	49	72 1/3	21	18	34	69
Brayan Villarreal *	1	1	6.75	16	0	0	16	12	12	10	14
Robbie Weinhardt *	0	0	10.80	2	0	0	1 2/3	2	2	0	1
Adam Wilk *	0	0	5.40	5	0	0	13 1/3	10	8	3	10
Team Pitching Totals	95	67	4.04	162	162	52	1440	711	647	492	1115

* No longer on roster

== Farm system ==
Level	Team	League	Manager
AAA	Toledo Mud Hens	International League	Phil Nevin
AA	Erie SeaWolves	Eastern League	Chris Cron
A	Lakeland Flying Tigers	Florida State League	Dave Huppert
A	West Michigan Whitecaps	Midwest League	Ernie Young
A-Short Season	Connecticut Tigers	New York–Penn League	Andrew Graham
Rookie	GCL Tigers	Gulf Coast League	Basilio Cabrera
