= Duane Below =

American baseball pitcher (born 1985)

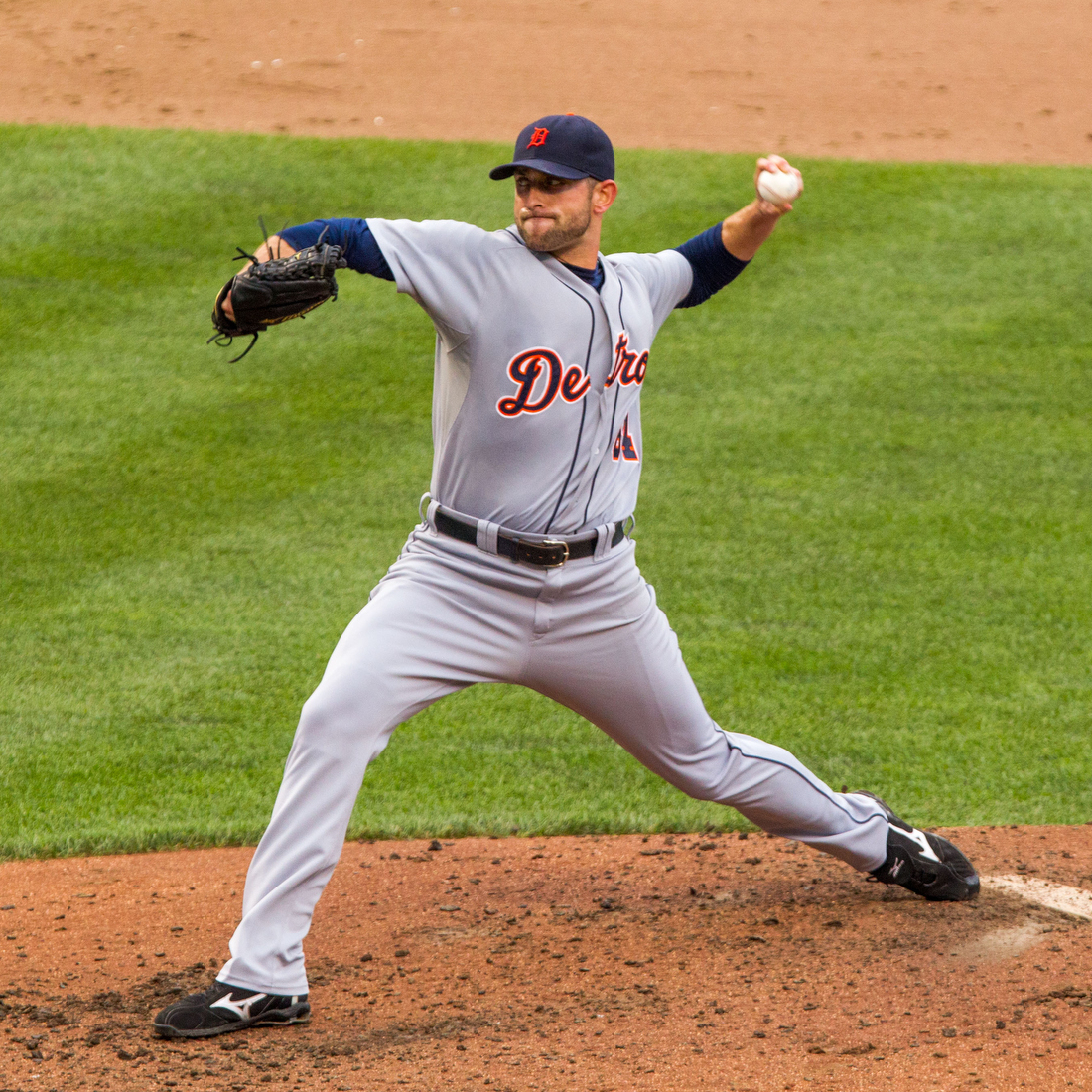
- Below with the Detroit Tigers
- Pitcher
- Born: November 15, 1985 (age 39); Britton, Michigan, U.S.
- Batted: Left Threw: Left

Professional debut
- MLB: July 20, 2011, for the Detroit Tigers
- KBO: August 8, 2013, for the Kia Tigers
- NPB: September 16, 2015, for the Yokohama DeNA BayStars

Last appearance
- MLB: May 27, 2013, for the Miami Marlins
- KBO: October 4, 2013, for the Kia Tigers
- NPB: September 16, 2015, for the Yokohama DeNA BayStars

MLB statistics
- Win–loss record: 2–4
- Earned run average: 4.27
- Strikeouts: 45

KBO statistics
- Win–loss record: 3-2
- Earned run average: 4.02
- Strikeouts: 38

NPB statistics
- Win–loss record: 0-1
- Earned run average: 33.75
- Strikeouts: 0
- Stats at Baseball Reference

Teams
- Detroit Tigers (2011–2012); Miami Marlins (2013); Kia Tigers (2013); Yokohama DeNA BayStars (2015)

Duane Arthur Below (/ˈbiːloʊ/ BEE-loh; born November 15, 1985) is an American former professional baseball pitcher. He has played in Major League Baseball (MLB) for the Miami Marlins and Detroit Tigers. Below has also played in the KBO League for the Kia Tigers and in Nippon Professional Baseball (NPB) for the Yokohama DeNA BayStars.

== Professional career ==
=== Detroit Tigers ===
Prior to playing professionally, Below attended Britton-Macon Area School District, in Britton, Michigan and Lake Michigan College. He was drafted by the Tigers in the 19th round of the 2006 amateur draft and began his professional career that year. He is the first player from Britton to be on a major league roster.

Below pitched for two teams in 2006, the GCL Tigers (15 games) and the Oneonta Tigers (two games). Overall, he went 2–0 with a 2.09 ERA in 17 games (six starts). In 2007, he pitched for the West Michigan Whitecaps, going 13–5 with a 2.97 ERA in 26 starts, striking out 160 batters in 145 2/3 innings. With the Lakeland Flying Tigers in 2008, he went 8–7 with a 4.46 ERA in 27 games (26 starts). He split 2009 between Lakeland (six games) and the Erie SeaWolves (two games), going 2–4 with a 2.70 ERA in eight starts overall. With Erie again in 2010, he went 7–12 with a 4.93 ERA in 28 starts.

Following the reassignment of Charlie Furbush from the Tigers to the Toledo Mud Hens, Below was called up to assume a starting vacancy. Below took the place on the active roster spot for Adam Wilk, while Casper Wells was reassigned to allow Furbush to return to the bullpen. Below made his major league debut against the Oakland Athletics on July 20, 2011, allowing one earned run in five innings. Below earned a no-decision in the game. Below went 0–2 in 14 games in 2011.

In 2012, Below was on the opening roster for the Tigers for the first time in his career, made available after an injury to Luis Marte. In his first two appearances of the season, Below earned wins in relief against the Boston Red Sox. On April 7, he won in relief of Doug Fister, who left the game early after a left-side strain. The next day, he earned a win after retiring one batter in the 11th inning.

The Tigers designated Below for assignment on April 24, 2013.

=== Miami Marlins ===
Below was claimed off waivers on April 25, 2013, by the Miami Marlins, who assigned him to the Triple-A New Orleans Zephyrs. He made two appearances for Miami, allowing three runs in six hits with two strikeouts over 2 2/3 innings.

=== Kia Tigers ===
On July 31, 2013, Below signed with the Kia Tigers of the KBO League. In 11 games (8 starts) for Kia, he logged a 3–2 record and 4.02 ERA with 38 strikeouts across 47 innings pitched.

=== Detroit Tigers (second stint) ===
Below signed a minor league contract to return to the Detroit Tigers organization on December 11, 2013.

=== New York Mets ===
On February 7, 2015, Below signed a Minor League deal with the New York Mets. He made 11 appearances (5 starts) for the Triple–A Las Vegas 51s, compiling a 4-3 record, 2.19 ERA and 1.10 WHIP with 28 strikeouts over 49 1/3 innings pitched. Below was released by the Mets organization on June 26.

=== Yokohama DeNA BayStars ===
On July 2, 2015, Below signed with the Yokohama DeNA BayStars of Nippon Professional Baseball. He ultimately made only one appearance for the team, allowing 5 runs in 1 1/3 innings of work.

=== New York Mets (second stint) ===
On December 14, 2015, Below signed a minor league contract to return to the New York Mets organization. In 24 games (23 starts) for the Triple–A Las Vegas 51s, he compiled a 5–12 record and 5.27 ERA with 103 strikeouts across 140 innings pitched. Below elected free agency following the season on November 7, 2016.

=== Somerset Patriots ===
Below signed with the Somerset Patriots of the Atlantic League of Professional Baseball for the 2017 season. He was named an All-Star in a season that saw him make 46 appearances out of the bullpen, in which he compiled a 2.89 ERA with 58 strikeouts over 62 1/3 innings pitched. Below became a free agent following the season.

On February 7, 2018, Below re–signed with Somerset. He made 22 starts for the Patriots, registering a 9–6 record and 3.99 ERA with 94 strikeouts en route to his second consecutive All-Star selection.

On March 13, 2019, Below re–signed with the Patriots for his third season with the team. In 22 relief outings, he struggled to a 6.08 ERA with 30 strikeouts in 26 2/3 innings of work.

== Pitching style ==
Below's primary pitch is a four-seam fastball at 89–92 mph. He also throws a slider (85–88), a 12–6 curveball (78–82), a changeup (84–86). His repertoire against left-handed hitters is mostly fastball-slider-curveball, while against right-handers he substitutes the changeup for the curveball. His pitches have below-average whiff rates, and his K/9 rate is 5.1.
