= Delmon Young =

American baseball player (born 1985)

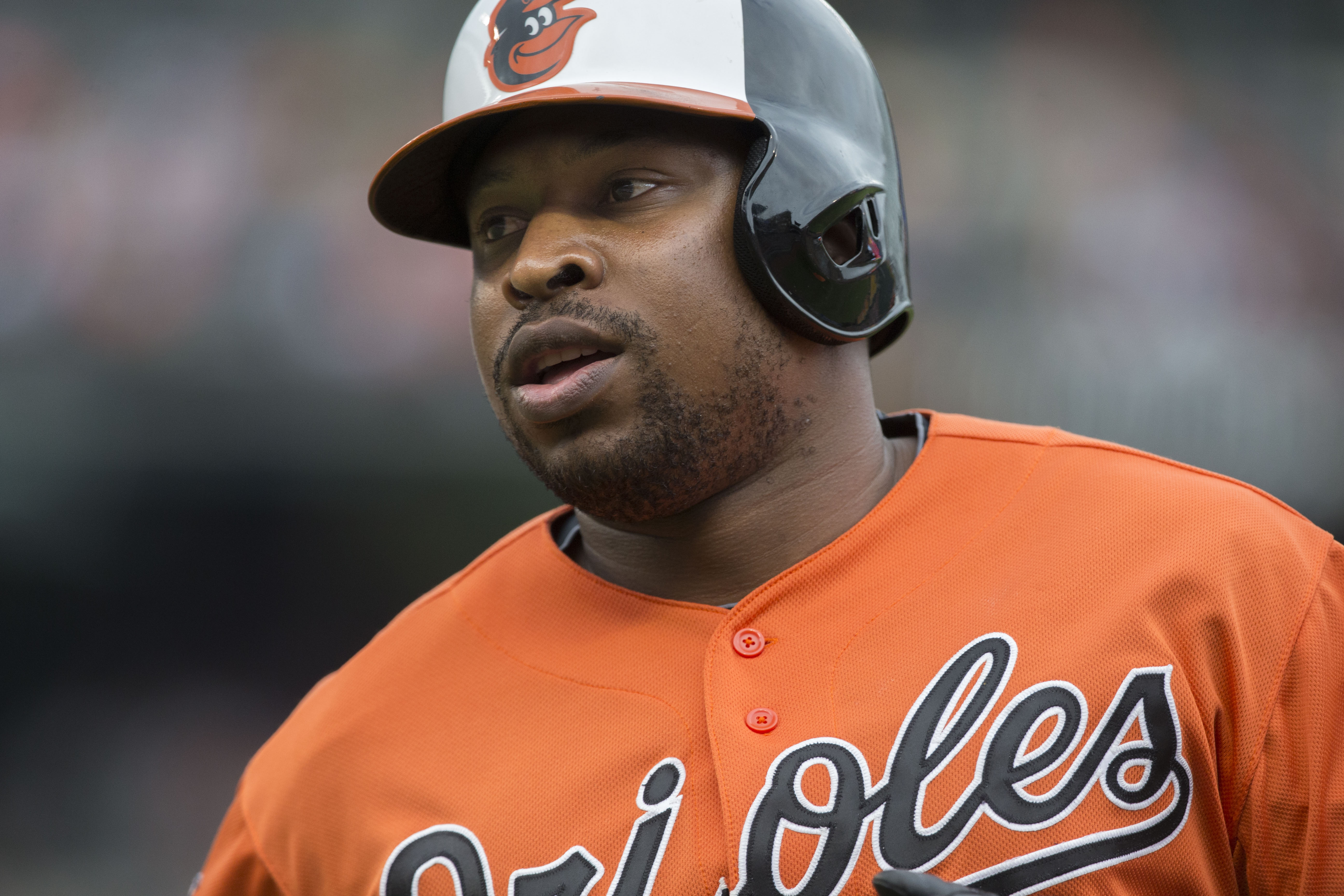
- Young with the Baltimore Orioles in 2014
- Outfielder / Designated hitter
- Born: September 14, 1985 (age 41); Montgomery, Alabama, U.S.
- Batted: Right Threw: Right

MLB debut
- August 29, 2006, for the Tampa Bay Devil Rays

Last MLB appearance
- June 29, 2015, for the Baltimore Orioles

MLB statistics
- Batting average: .283
- Home runs: 109
- Runs batted in: 566
- Stats at Baseball Reference

Teams
- Tampa Bay Devil Rays (2006–2007); Minnesota Twins (2008–2011); Detroit Tigers (2011–2012); Philadelphia Phillies (2013); Tampa Bay Rays (2013); Baltimore Orioles (2014–2015)

Career highlights and awards
- ALCS MVP (2012)
Medals
Men's baseball
Representing United States
World Junior Baseball Championship
Bronze medal – third place	2002 Sherbrooke	Team

Delmon Damarcus Young (born September 14, 1985) is an American former professional baseball outfielder and designated hitter. He played in Major League Baseball (MLB) for the Tampa Bay Devil Rays/Rays, Minnesota Twins, Detroit Tigers, Philadelphia Phillies, and Baltimore Orioles. He is the younger brother of former major league outfielder and first baseman Dmitri Young. He was the first-overall pick in the 2003 MLB draft.

== Minor league career ==
Young graduated from Adolfo Camarillo High School in 2003, located in Camarillo, California, whereupon he was drafted first overall in the 2003 Major League Baseball draft.

In 2005, Young hit .336 with 20 home runs, 71 RBI and an OPS of .968 in 84 games with the Double-A Montgomery Biscuits, winning the Southern League Most Valuable Player Award despite playing in just 60% of the games. In May, he received a three-game suspension for bumping an umpire. Young was promoted to the Triple-A Durham Bulls on July 15, 2005, where he batted .285 with six home runs and 28 RBI in 52 games. After the season was over, he was named Baseball America's Minor League Player of the Year and its number one overall prospect for the 2006 season. Young finished his minor league career with a .318 batting average.

=== Umpire controversy and suspension ===
On April 26, 2006, while playing for the Durham Bulls in a game against the Pawtucket Red Sox, Young was called out on a third strike call, after which he stared at the umpire for some time and refused to leave the batter's box. On his way back to his dugout, Young was ejected for arguing. He then turned and tossed his bat underhand, end-over-end, toward the umpire. The bat hit the umpire on his chest and arm, but he was not seriously hurt.

The next day, Young issued an apology through his agent, claiming that he had not intended for the bat to actually strike the umpire, but acknowledging that it was unacceptable to have thrown the bat at all. The International League suspended Young for 50 games, without pay. Young had the option to appeal the suspension, but chose not to do so. The suspension ended on June 19, 2006.

== Major league career ==
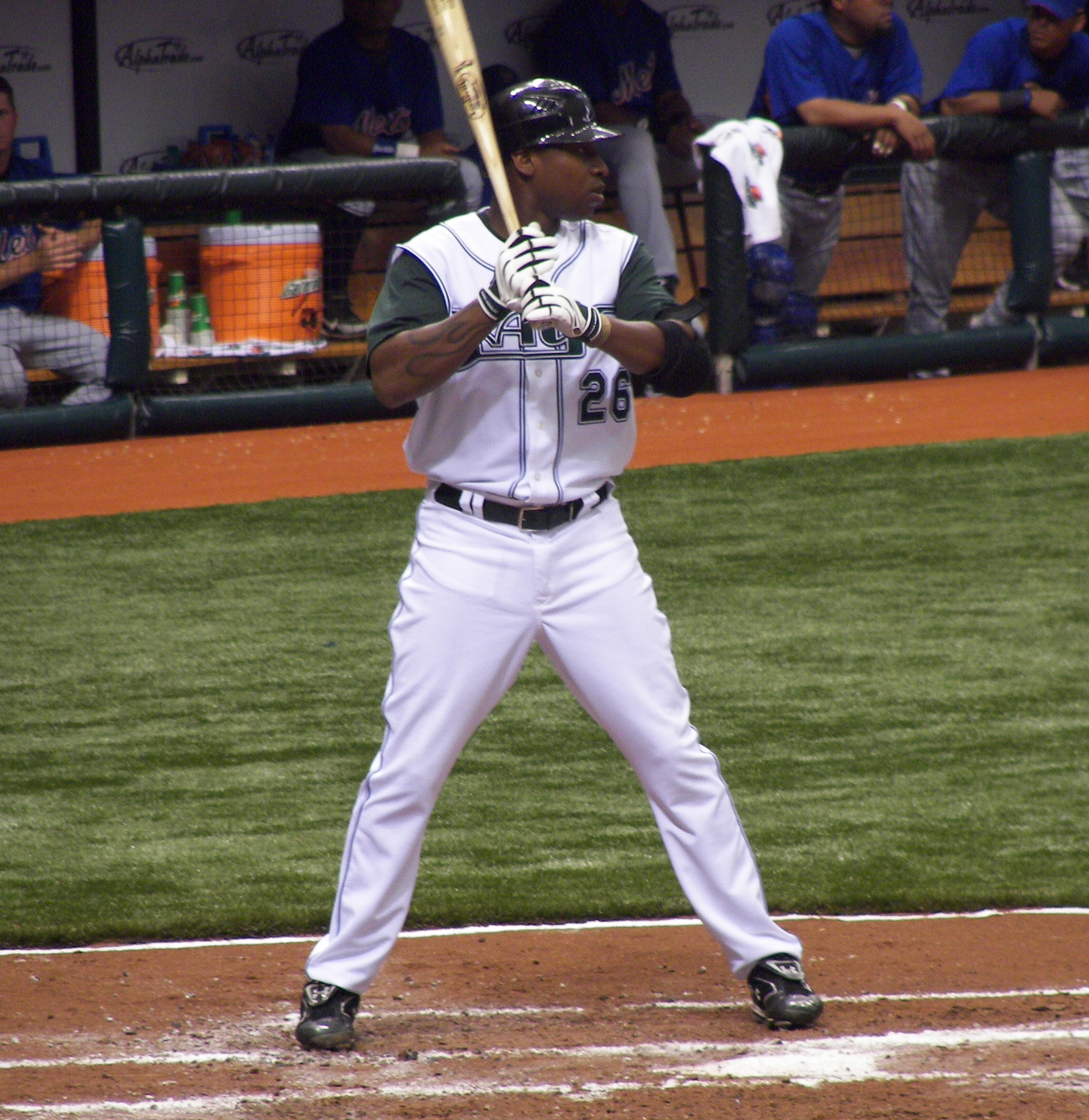
Young with the Tampa Bay Devil Rays in 2007

=== Tampa Bay Devil Rays ===
On August 28, 2006, the Devil Rays called Young up to the major leagues after it was decided that Jonny Gomes had to undergo season-ending surgery. His first game at the Major League level was against the Chicago White Sox and occurred on August 29, 2006, ten years to the day his older brother Dmitri played in his first major league game. In Delmon's first major league plate appearance, White Sox pitcher Freddy García hit Young with a first-pitch fastball. After striking out in his first official at-bat, Young stroked a curveball for a 412-foot (126 m) two-run home run, which was his first Major League hit. Young played in 30 games with the Devil Rays in 2006, batting .317 with three home runs and 10 RBI.

As a 21-year-old in 2007, Young finished second in American League Rookie of the Year voting to Boston second baseman Dustin Pedroia, hitting .288 with 13 home runs and 93 RBI, playing all 162 games in the season. Young was also a unanimous selection to the 2007 Topps Major League Rookie All-Star Team. The selection was the result of the 49th annual Topps balloting of Major League managers.

On November 28, 2007, the Rays traded Young, along with Brendan Harris and Jason Pridie, to the Minnesota Twins for Jason Bartlett, Matt Garza, and Eduardo Morlan.

=== Minnesota Twins ===
Young had an impressive spring training. In 36 at-bats, he batted .361 with two doubles, one home run, and 7 RBI, locking up his spot in left field for opening day. Young finished the 2008 season with eight errors, more than any other left fielder in the majors, while his 11 assists led AL left fielders.

In 2008, Young played in 152 games with the Twins, batting .290 with 10 home runs and 69 RBI. He got off to a slow start in 2009, but had a good September, finishing with 12 home runs, 60 RBI and a .284 batting average.

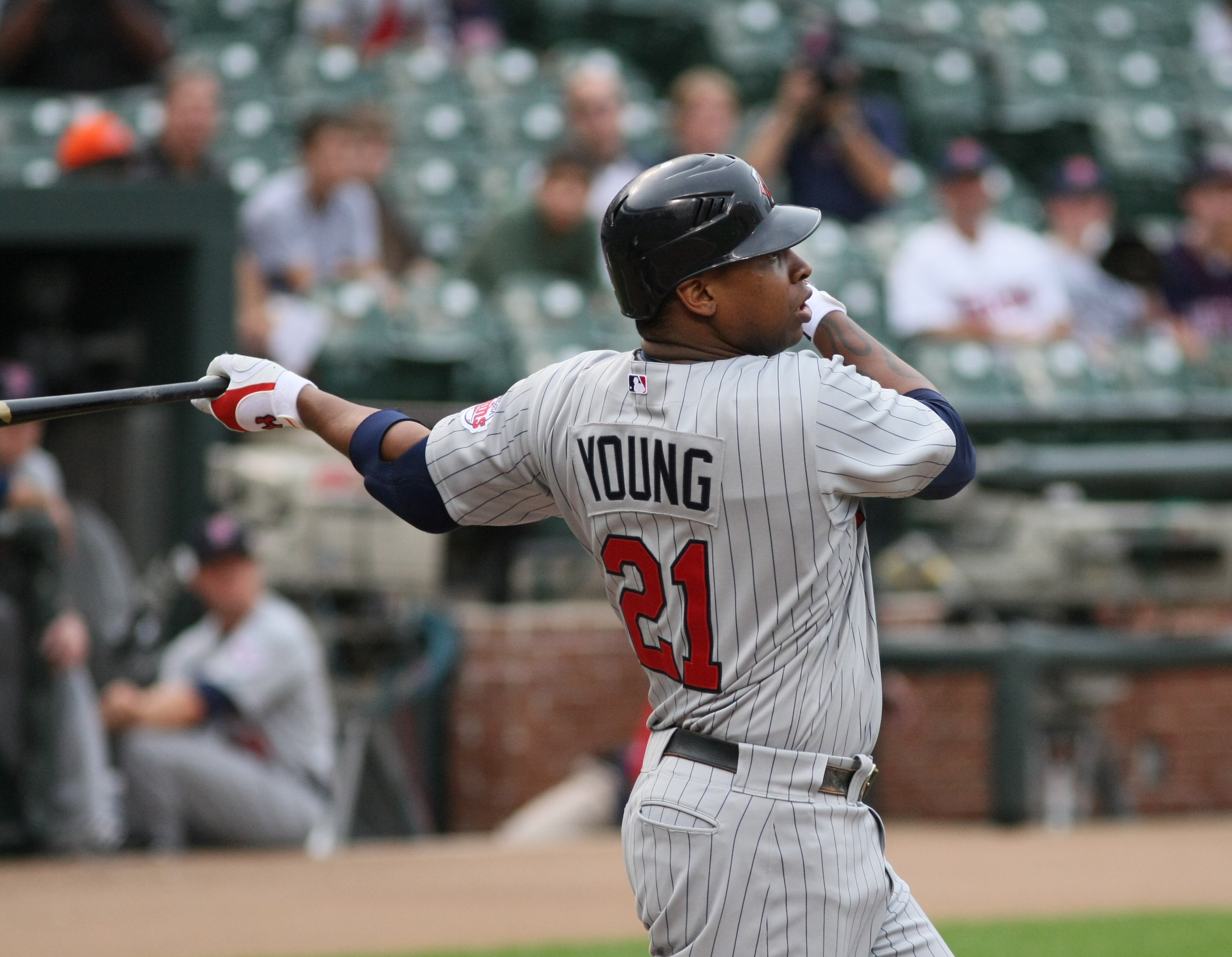
Young batting for the Minnesota Twins in 2008

With the trade of Carlos Gómez to the Milwaukee Brewers, Young became the Twins' starting left fielder for the 2010 season. During the off-season Young shed 35 pounds, down to 200. The 2010 season ended up being Young's best offensive season to date. Young hit .298 with 21 home runs and 112 RBIs, finished tenth in the voting for AL MVP, and was a finalist for a spot on the American League All-Star roster through the online All-Star Final Vote. On defense, he led AL left fielders in errors, with four, and had the lowest fielding percentage, at .984.

Young began the 2011 season batting .266 with four home runs and 32 RBI in 84 games with the Twins.

=== Detroit Tigers ===
Young was traded to the Detroit Tigers in a waiver trade on August 15, 2011, for minor league pitchers Cole Nelson and Lester Oliveros. That night, the Tigers played the Twins, and he batted in the number three spot in front of Miguel Cabrera. In his first at bat with the Tigers, Young hit a home run to left field. In 2011, he batted a combined .268 with 12 home runs (8 with the Tigers) and 64 RBI in 124 games. On defense, Young tied for the major league lead in errors by a left fielder, with seven.

In his first at bat in the playoffs as a Tiger, Young hit a home run to right field off CC Sabathia in Game 1 of the 2011 ALDS. In addition to his earlier post-season home run, he hit the game-winning home run in the bottom of the seventh inning in Game 3 off Rafael Soriano, giving Detroit a 2–1 lead over the New York Yankees. In Game 5, Young suffered a strained oblique muscle and was left off the ALCS roster. He was activated to play in Game 2. During Game 5 of the ALCS against the Texas Rangers, Young hit two home runs off C. J. Wilson, scoring three runs. He is the fourth Detroit Tiger to hit more than one home run in a postseason game (after Alan Trammell, Kirk Gibson and Magglio Ordóñez).

Young continued his postseason prowess in 2012. In the 2012 American League Championship Series, Young was named series MVP after hitting .353 with two home runs and 6 RBI in the Tigers' four-game sweep of the Yankees. He batted .357 in the 2012 World Series and hit his first World Series home run in Game 4 as the Tigers lost the series to the San Francisco Giants in a four-game sweep.

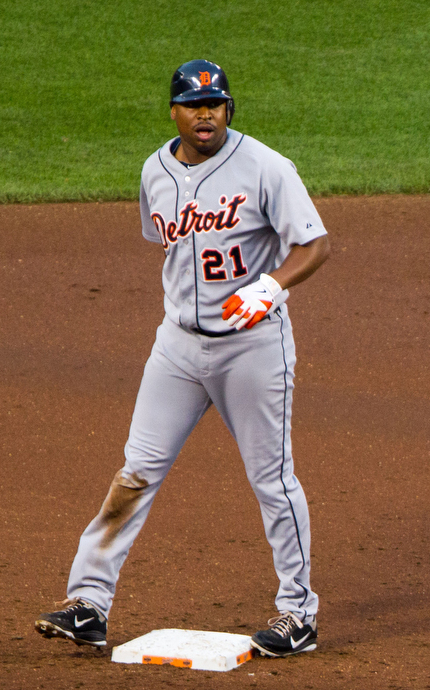
Young with Detroit Tigers in 2012

Young, who earned a reported $6.75 million for 2012, became a free agent after the season concluded.

=== Philadelphia Phillies ===
On January 22, 2013, Young and the Phillies agreed on a one-year contract worth $750,000, which could become worth as much as $3.5 million based on roster and performance bonuses. The incentives included provisions that could allow Young to earn up to an additional $600,000 for losing weight and keeping it off during the season. The Phillies intended for Young to start in right field. Young began the season on the 15-day disabled list after having ankle surgery in the off-season. He was activated on April 30, and made his Phillies debut the next day, hitting a solo home run in his first at bat. On August 9, after batting .261 with eight home runs and 31 RBI through 80 games, he was designated for assignment to make room for Casper Wells on the active roster. On August 14, 2013, the Phillies released Young after he refused an assignment to the minor leagues.

=== Back to Tampa ===
On August 22, 2013, Young signed a minor league deal with the Tampa Bay Rays, who assigned him to the Double-A Montgomery Biscuits. It was his second stint with the franchise. He was added to the major league roster on September 1 when the rosters expanded. Young appeared in 23 games with the Rays in September, batting .258 with three home runs and 7 RBI. The Rays later included him on their postseason roster. In the 2013 American League Wild Card Game, Young again continued his postseason prowess with a solo home run in the Rays' 4–0 win over the Cleveland Indians. He later batted .250 with 2 RBI in the 2013 ALDS as the Rays fell to the Boston Red Sox in four games.

=== Baltimore Orioles ===
Young signed a minor league deal with the Baltimore Orioles in January 2014. On March 29, 2014, it was announced that Young had earned a spot on the Orioles' Opening Day roster. Young hit his first home run as a member of the Orioles on April 8, 2014, in a 14–5 victory over the New York Yankees at Yankee Stadium. He finished the 2014 season batting .302 with seven home runs and 30 RBI in 83 games. Young particularly excelled as a pinch hitter, finishing 10-for-20 (.500) off the bench for Baltimore.

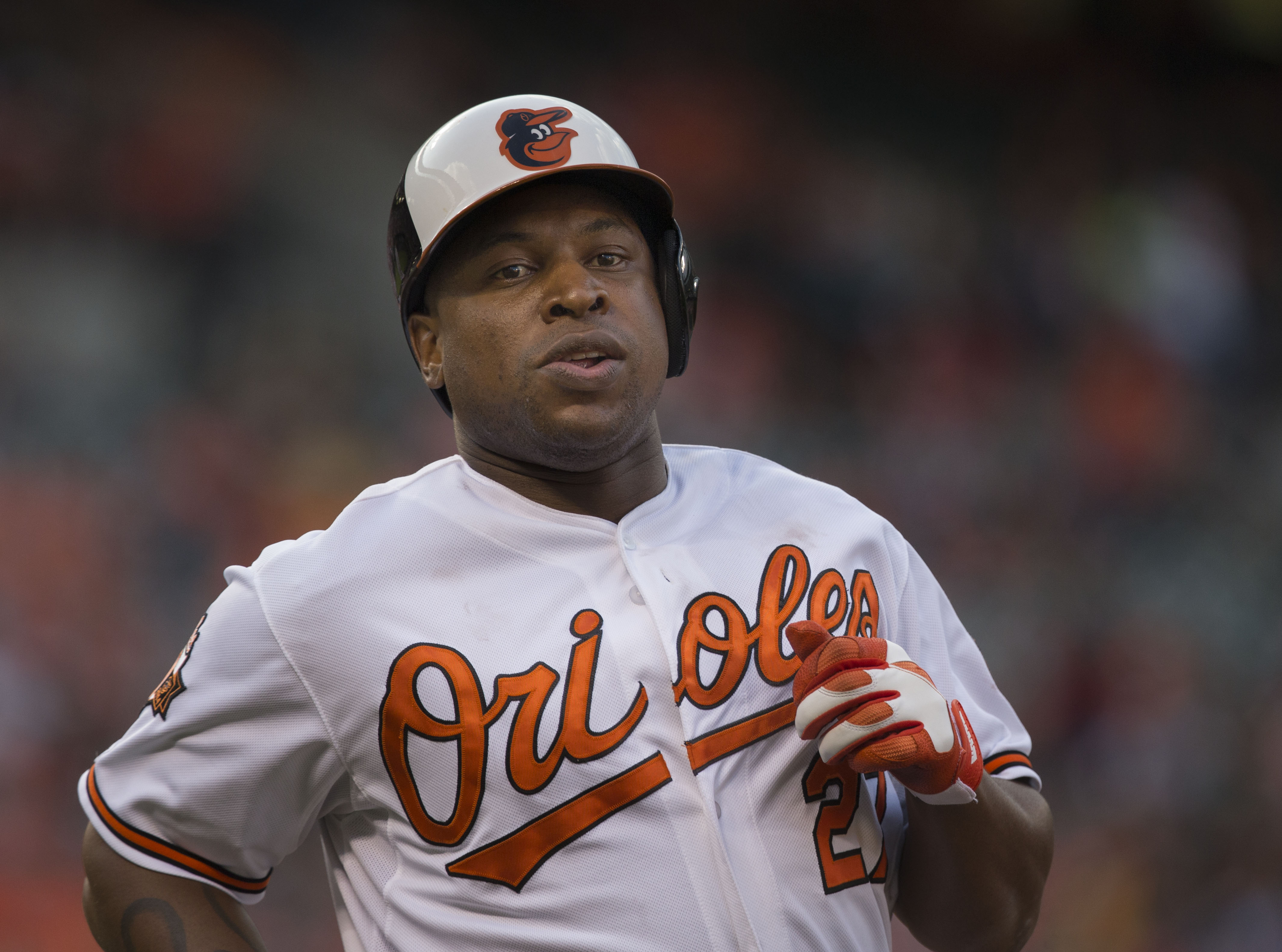
Young with the Baltimore Orioles in 2014

On October 3, 2014, Young came in as a pinch hitter with one out and the bases loaded in the bottom of the eighth inning of Game 2 of the 2014 American League Division Series against his former team, the Detroit Tigers. He swung at the first pitch and hit a base-clearing double that gave the Orioles a 7–6 lead. The Orioles won the game and took a 2–0 lead in the series.

On December 24, 2014, Young re-signed with the Orioles on a one-year, $2.25 million deal that could reach $3 million if he hits all of the deal's incentives. After finding himself in a crowded outfield situation, he was designated for assignment on July 1, 2015. At the time, he was batting .270 with two home runs and 16 RBI in 52 games. Young was released on July 9.

=== Melbourne Aces ===
On October 10, 2017, it was announced that Young had signed a contract to play for the Melbourne Aces of the Australian Baseball League in an attempt to resurrect his Major League career.

=== Acereros de Monclova ===
On February 21, 2018, Young signed with the Acereros de Monclova of the Mexican League. In 21 appearances for Monclova, he batted .291/.340/.430 with two home runs and 14 RBI. Young was released by the Acereros on April 18.

=== Pericos de Puebla ===
Young later signed with the Pericos de Puebla on June 18, 2018. In 49 appearances for the Pericos, Young batted .335/.368/.563 with 11 home runs, 56 RBI, and one stolen base.

=== Venezuelan Winter League ===
During the 2018/2019 season, Young played for Navegantes del Magallanes of the Venezuelan Professional Baseball League, becoming the first Magallanes player to earn the MVP award for the league. Young played in 61 of 63 games, batting .294 with 19 home runs and 52 RBI in 252 at-bats. No other player had more than 10 home runs that same season.

=== Melbourne Aces (second stint) ===
After spending the 2018/19 winter season in Venezuela, Young returned to Australia in 2019/20 to play for the Melbourne Aces. Young signed on to play for the Aces again in the 2020/21 season.

== Legal issues ==
On April 27, 2012, Young was arrested for aggravated harassment as a hate crime in New York City. The Tigers had been scheduled to play the Yankees later that evening. The New York Police Department said he yelled an anti-Semitic slur while he was intoxicated. Later in the day, Young issued a statement apologizing for his actions. Young was released on $5,000 bail. The Tigers subsequently put Young on the restricted list pending action by Major League Baseball. Young was suspended by MLB for seven days without pay, retroactive to Friday, April 27, for the incident, and ordered to undergo counseling. On November 7, 2012, Young pleaded guilty to aggravated harassment. He was sentenced to perform 10 days of community service and ordered to attend a program at the Museum of Tolerance.

On February 7, 2016, Young was arrested for battery after he allegedly choked and threatened a valet at a hotel in Miami, Florida. The incident occurred when Young tried to enter a club in the hotel that was closed. After being denied entry, Young was said to have made anti-Hispanic comments towards the valet, choked him and threatened to kill him.
