= Lester Oliveros =

Venezuelan baseball player (born 1988)

Free agent
- Relief pitcher
- Born: May 28, 1988 (age 37); Maracay, Aragua, Venezuela
- Bats: Right Throws: Right

MLB debut
- July 1, 2011, for the Detroit Tigers

MLB statistics (through 2014 season)
- Win–loss record: 0–1
- Earned run average: 5.22
- Strikeouts: 19
- Stats at Baseball Reference

Teams
- Detroit Tigers (2011); Minnesota Twins (2011–2012, 2014)

Lester Jesus Oliveros Blanco (born May 28, 1988) is a Venezuelan professional baseball relief pitcher who is a free agent. He has previously played in Major League Baseball (MLB) for the Detroit Tigers and Minnesota Twins. He is 6 feet 0 inches (1.83 m) tall and he weighs 225 pounds (102 kg).

== Career ==
=== Detroit Tigers ===
Oliveros began his professional career in 2006, playing for the VSL Marlins/Tigers. That season, he went 1–3 with a 2.72 ERA in 20 games (two starts), striking out 46 batters in 39 1/3 innings. In 2007, he pitched for the VSL Tigers, going 2–0 with a 1.41 ERA in 27 relief appearances, striking out 59 batters in 38 1/3 innings. He moved to the United States in 2008, splitting the season between the Oneonta Tigers (15 games) and Lakeland Flying Tigers (five games), going a combined 2–3 with a 2.59 ERA. He struck out 37 batters in 31 1/3 innings of work. In 2009, he pitched for the Flying Tigers (34 games) and Toledo Mud Hens (one game), posting a 4–2 record with a 4.02 ERA. Despite his inflated ERA, he managed once again to average more than one strikeout per inning, with 61 strikeouts in 56 innings pitched. He split 2010 between the Flying Tigers and Erie SeaWolves, going a combined 1–3 with a 3.65 ERA in 44 games, striking out 60 batters in 44 1/3 innings.

Oliveros was called up to the Tigers on July 1, 2011, to replace the injured Al Alburquerque.

=== Minnesota Twins ===
On August 16, 2011, Oliveros was traded to the Minnesota Twins as the player to be named later in the earlier trade for Delmon Young. He was assigned to the Rochester Red Wings, the Twins' Triple-A affiliate. Between Detroit and Minnesota, Oliveros pitched in 19 games, recording a 4.64 ERA.

In 2012, Oliveros spent the majority of the season split between Rochester and the Double-A New Britain Rock Cats, registering a 2-3 record and 2.42 ERA in 32 games between the two. He also appeared in just 1 game for the Twins, allowing one run in 1 2/3 innings of work. On December 1, 2012, Oliveros was non-tendered by Minnesota and re-signed to a minor league contract. In 2013, Oliveros was hurt for most of the season, appearing in just 6 games for the rookie–level Gulf Coast League Twins.

Oliveros began the 2014 season with New Britain and also played for Rochester, posting a 4-3 record and stellar 1.64 ERA in 50 appearances between the two teams. On September 1, 2014, Oliveros was selected to the active roster. In 6.1 major league innings, Oliveros struggled to a 7.11 ERA. He was the only Twins pitcher that year to throw a ball that was 97 mph or faster, something he did once. No other team that year had fewer than 75 pitches thrown 97 mph or faster.

On March 27, 2015, Oliveros was outrighted off of the 40-man roster. He spent the year in Rochester, logging a 3-2 record and 3.79 ERA in 24 appearances. Oliveros elected free agency following the season on November 6.

=== Kansas City Royals ===
On January 20, 2016, Oliveros signed a minor league contract with the Kansas City Royals organization. He was assigned to the Triple-A Omaha Storm Chasers to begin the season. He was released by the Royals on August 3 without appearing in a game for the organization.

=== Guerreros de Oaxaca ===
On January 23, 2020, Oliveros signed with the Tecolotes de los Dos Laredos of the Mexican League. He did not play in a game in 2020 due to the cancellation of the Mexican League season because of the COVID-19 pandemic. Oliveros was released by the team on October 28.

On February 26, 2021, Oliveros signed with the Guerreros de Oaxaca of the Mexican League. Oliveros pitched to an 0-2 record and 6.35 ERA in 5 games before being released by Oaxaca on June 15.

=== Piratas de Campeche ===
On June 18, 2021, Oliveros signed with the Piratas de Campeche of the Mexican League. He made 21 appearances for the team down the stretch, recording a 1.66 ERA with 29 strikeouts across 21 2/3 innings pitched.

Oliveros pitched in 9 games for Campeche in 2022, logging a 1.00 ERA with 8 strikeouts and 5 saves across 9 innings of work. He made 37 appearances for the Piratas in 2023, compiling a 4–4 record and 3.20 ERA with 43 strikeouts and 12 saves across 39 1/3 innings pitched.

Oliveros did not appear in a game for Campeche during the 2024 campaign. On November 18, 2024, Oliveros was released by the Pirates.

== See also ==
- List of Major League Baseball players from Venezuela
