= David Pauley =

American baseball player (born 1983)

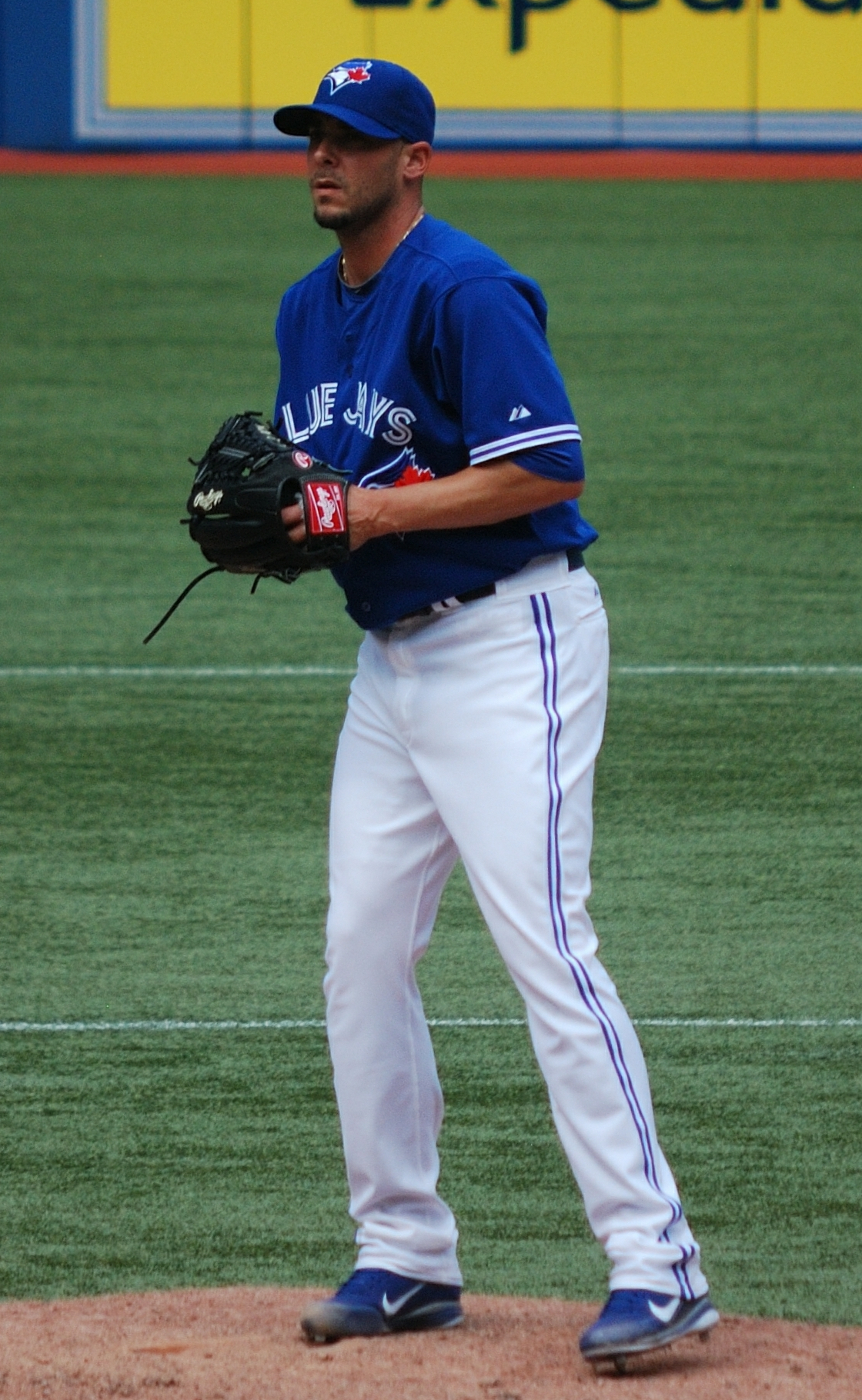
- Pauley with the Toronto Blue Jays
- Pitcher
- Born: June 17, 1983 (age 43); Longmont, Colorado, U.S.
- Batted: Right Threw: Right

MLB debut
- May 31, 2006, for the Boston Red Sox

Last MLB appearance
- July 2, 2012, for the Toronto Blue Jays

MLB statistics
- Win–loss record: 9–19
- Earned run average: 4.68
- Strikeouts: 122
- Stats at Baseball Reference

Teams
- Boston Red Sox (2006, 2008); Seattle Mariners (2010–2011); Detroit Tigers (2011); Los Angeles Angels of Anaheim (2012); Toronto Blue Jays (2012)

David Wayne Pauley (born June 17, 1983) is an American former professional baseball pitcher. Pauley pitched for five Major League Baseball (MLB) teams from 2006 to 2012. He batted and threw right-handed.

== Career ==
=== Early life ===
Pauley graduated from Longmont High School in Longmont, Colorado.

=== San Diego Padres ===
An eighth round pick by San Diego in 2001, Pauley posted a 7–12 record with a 4.17 ERA for the Padres' A-class affiliate, the Lake Elsinore Storm, as the Padres' seventh best prospect in 2004, according to Baseball America.

=== Boston Red Sox ===
On December 20, 2004, the Padres traded Pauley along with Jay Payton, Ramón Vázquez, and cash to the Boston Red Sox for Dave Roberts.

As a member of the Portland Sea Dogs rotation in 2005, he went 9–7 with 104 strikeouts and a 3.81 ERA in 156 innings pitched.

Pauley started 2006 in Portland. He posted a 2–3 record with a 2.39 ERA in 10 starts for the Sea Dogs before making his major league debut on May 31, starting for Boston in place of the injured David Wells. Pauley pitched 4 2/3 innings while allowing six runs on 11 hits in and 8–6 victory against the Toronto Blue Jays. He did not record a decision in the game. In his 16 innings pitched for the Red Sox, Pauley recorded a 7.88 ERA.

In 2007, Pauley was rated by Baseball America as the number 26 prospect in the Red Sox farm system. Pauley spent the entire 2007 season playing for the Pawtucket Red Sox. The Red Sox invited him to spring training in 2008, but sent him back to the minors on March 8, 2008. In January 2009, Pauley was designated for assignment to make room for the newly signed John Smoltz.

=== Baltimore Orioles ===
On January 19, 2009, Pauley was traded to the Baltimore Orioles for pitcher Randor Bierd. He spent the entire season with the Triple-A Norfolk Tides.

=== Seattle Mariners ===
On December 22, 2009, Pauley signed a minor league contract with the Seattle Mariners. On August 13, 2010, he earned his first major league win. He started 2011 strong, going 4-1 with a 1.52 ERA in 41 innings through June 26.

=== Detroit Tigers ===
On July 30, 2011, Pauley was traded to the Detroit Tigers along with Doug Fister for Charlie Furbush, Casper Wells, Chance Ruffin, and minor leaguer Francisco Martinez. He allowed 10 runs in 19 2/3 innings for the Tigers. Detroit released Pauley on March 12, 2012, and he became a free agent after clearing waivers on March 15.

=== Los Angeles Angels of Anaheim ===
The Angels signed Pauley to a minor league contract on March 23, 2012. He was called up to the majors on May 7, 2012 but was designated for assignment on May 24. Pauley cleared waivers and was then recalled to the Angels on June 12. He was designated for assignment a second time on June 18.

=== Toronto Blue Jays ===
Pauley was claimed by the Blue Jays on June 20 after being designated for assignment by the Angels for a second time. For the Blue Jays, Pauley sported a 0–1 record with a 6.48 ERA in 10 relief appearances. He was designated for assignment after he gave up three earned runs on three hits against the Kansas City Royals on July 2, in what would be his final MLB appearance.

=== Seattle Mariners (second stint) ===
The Seattle Mariners signed Pauley to a minor league contract on July 12 and assigned him to the Triple-A Tacoma Rainiers on July 14. In August, MLB suspended him for 50 games for violating the Minor League Drug Prevention and Treatment program. The suspension came after Pauley tested positive a second time for a "drug of abuse," not a performance-enhancing drug.

=== Arizona Diamondbacks ===
On June 10, 2013, Pauley signed a minor-league deal with the Arizona Diamondbacks and was assigned to Triple-A Reno. After pitching in four games for the Aces, Pauley was released by the team. In those four games, he went 0–1, giving up 10 hits and seven runs in 5 2/3 innings.

=== Sugar Land Skeeters ===
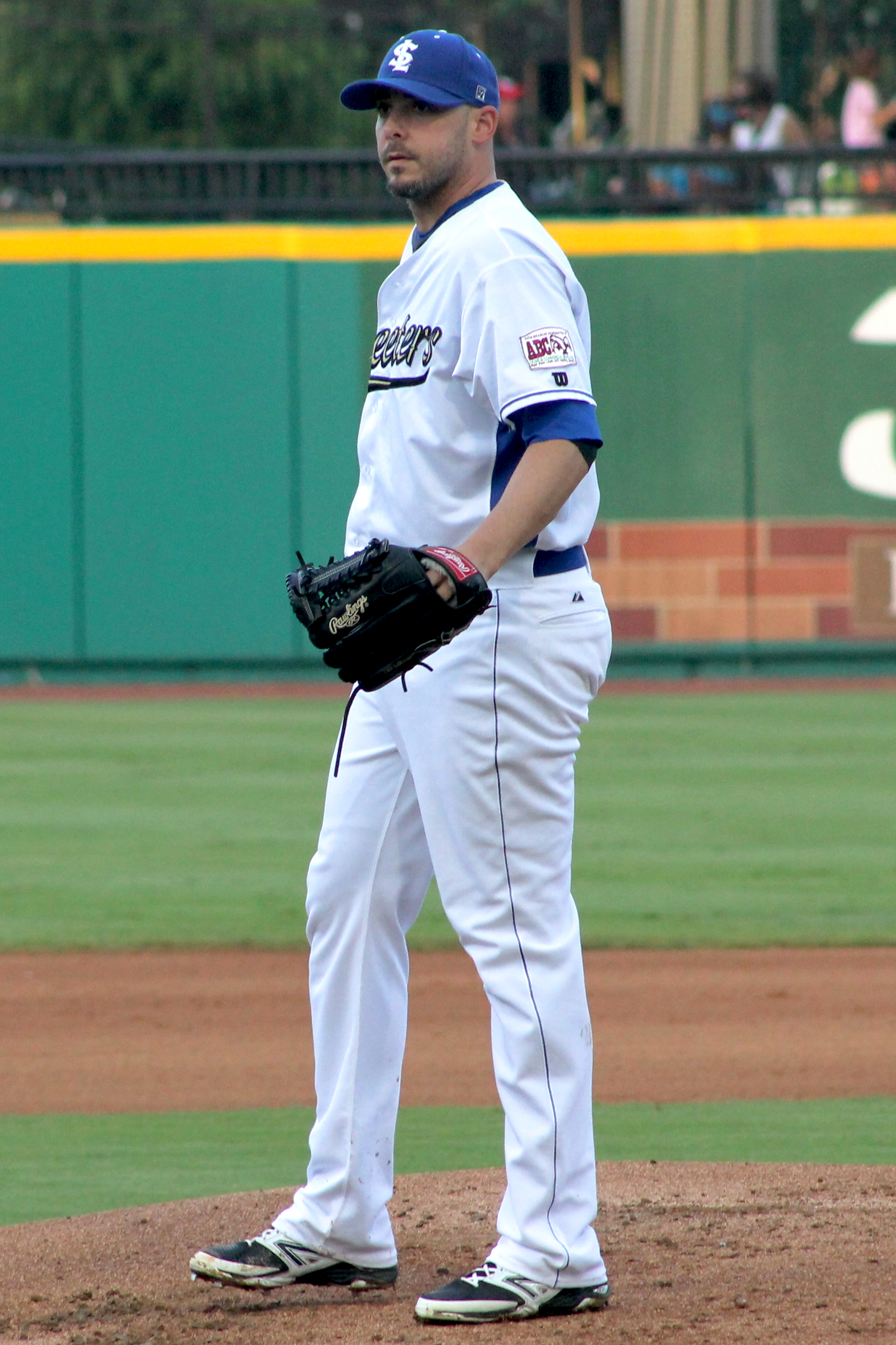
Pauley with Sugar Land in 2014

On July 25, 2013, Pauley signed with the independent Sugar Land Skeeters of the Atlantic League of Professional Baseball. In 12 starts, he went 5–3 with a 3.44 ERA, striking out 52 in 68 innings. He returned to Sugar Land in 2014, going 13–7 with a 2.67 ERA.

== Pitching style ==
Pauley was a sinkerball pitcher, and as such, his success relied on his ability to keep the ball down in the strike zone and induce groundball outs. He also threw a four-seam fastball, curveball, changeup, and slider. His fastball and sinker averaged 89 miles per hour. As a prospect, his curveball was considered his best pitch.

== Personal life ==
Pauley is married and has two children.
