= Al Alburquerque =

Dominican baseball player (born 1986)

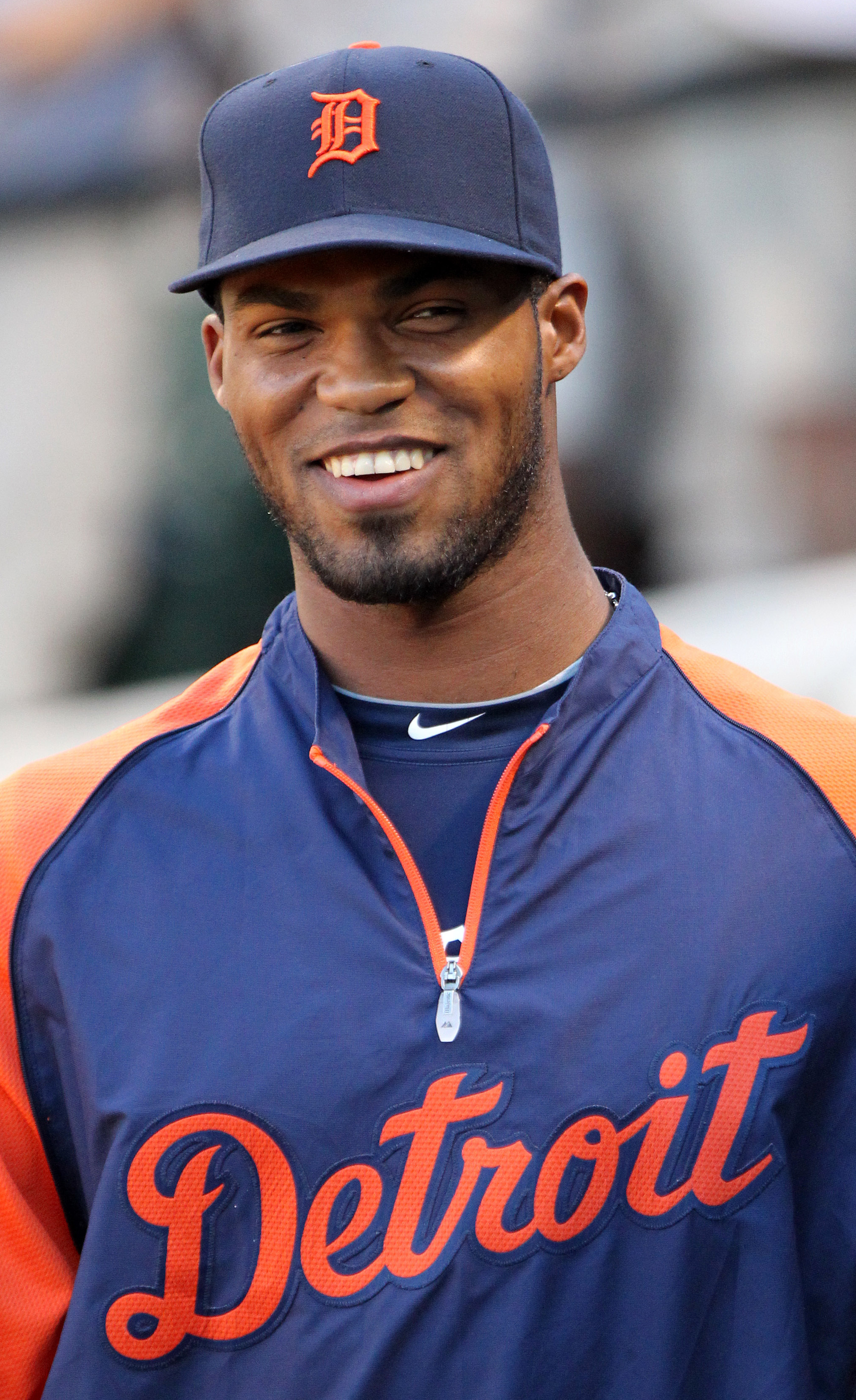
- Alburquerque with the Detroit Tigers

Free agent
- Pitcher
- Born: June 10, 1986 (age 40); San Pedro de Macorís, Dominican Republic
- Bats: Right Throws: Right

MLB debut
- April 15, 2011, for the Detroit Tigers

MLB statistics (through 2017 season)
- Win–loss record: 17–8
- Earned run average: 3.16
- Strikeouts: 291
- Stats at Baseball Reference

Teams
- Detroit Tigers (2011–2015); Los Angeles Angels (2016); Kansas City Royals (2017); Chicago White Sox (2017)

Alberto Jose Alburquerque (Spanish pronunciation: [alβuɾˈkeɾke]; born June 10, 1986) is a Dominican professional baseball pitcher who is a free agent. He has previously played in Major League Baseball (MLB) for the Detroit Tigers, Los Angeles Angels, Kansas City Royals, and Chicago White Sox.

== Professional career ==
=== Chicago Cubs ===
Signed by scout Jose Serra, Alburquerque began his professional career in 2006 with the rookie-level Arizona League Cubs, in the Chicago Cubs farm system. He went 0–2 with a 5.98 ERA in eight games (five starts) that season. He also had 15 strikeouts in 12 2/3 innings. In 2007, he played for the Boise Hawks and Peoria Chiefs, going a combined 4–6 with a 5.83 ERA in 21 games (10 starts). In 66 1/3 innings, he struck out 69 batters. He did not play at all in 2008 due to a right shoulder tear.

Alburquerque began the 2009 season in the Cubs system, pitching for the Daytona Cubs.

=== Colorado Rockies ===
The Cubs traded Alburquerque to the Colorado Rockies on July 2, 2009, for Jeff Baker. He finished the season with the Tulsa Drillers. Overall, he went 2–3 with a 2.80 ERA in 47 relief appearances, striking out 75 batters in 61 innings. He pitched for the Drillers again in 2010, going 2–4 with a 4.98 ERA in 25 relief appearances. He became a free agent on November 6.

=== Detroit Tigers ===
==== 2011: MLB debut ====
Alburquerque signed a major league contract with the Detroit Tigers on November 19. The Tigers added him to their 40-man roster even though he had never appeared in an MLB game. Alburquerque was assigned to the Triple-A affiliate Toledo Mud Hens following spring training, where he appeared in 4 games, with a 1.93 ERA and 10 strikeouts in 4 2/3 innings pitched.

Alburquerque made his major league debut on April 15, 2011, on Jackie Robinson Day, wearing Robinson's number 42 on his jersey. He struck out the first batter he faced and pitched two scoreless innings with three strikeouts.

On August 12, 2011, Alburquerque was hit in the head by a ball hit by Baltimore Orioles infielder Robert Andino during batting practice. He was taken to the hospital and stayed overnight for tests. The next day, the Tigers placed him on the 7-day disabled list with a concussion. He appeared in 41 games for the Tigers in 2011, going 6–1 with a 1.87 ERA. In 43 1/3 innings, he allowed only 21 hits, while striking out 67 batters for an exceptional rate of 13.9 per 9 innings.

He made his postseason debut in the 2011 American League Division Series. He did not pitch well in 4 playoff games, allowing 3 earned runs in 2 innings.

==== 2012–2013: injury and return to the playoffs ====
Following the 2011 season, it was discovered that Alburquerque had suffered a non-displaced stress fracture in his right (throwing) elbow. He had a screw inserted during surgery performed by Dr. James Andrews, and had an expected recovery time of 6–8 months. On April 24, 2012, he was transferred to the 60-day disabled list, with an earliest possible return date of June 3.

On July 24, 2012, Alburquerque began a rehab assignment with the Lakeland Flying Tigers. On August 3, the organization moved him to the Toledo Mud Hens, with the expectation that the move meant a return to the Major League club in the near future. He appeared in 13 minor league games in 2012, going 1–0 with a 2.57 ERA and striking out 27 batters in 14 innings. He made his 2012 debut with the Tigers on September 4 against the Cleveland Indians, pitching 1 1/3 scoreless innings and striking out one batter. At the major league level, he made eight appearances during the regular season and posted a 0.68 ERA. He had 18 strikeouts in 13 1/3 innings.

Alburquerque was on the playoff roster for the American League Division Series against the Oakland Athletics. He made his first appearance of the postseason in Game 2, brought in to face Yoenis Céspedes in the bottom of the ninth with runners on first and third and two out, and the game tied at four runs apiece. Alburquerque ended the threat, inducing a ground ball back to the mound. In a moment of levity, he kissed the ball before flipping it softly to Prince Fielder at first to complete the play. Alburquerque earned the win when Don Kelly hit an RBI sacrifice fly to right to win the game in the bottom of the inning. Alburquerque also pitched one scoreless inning of relief in Game 4 of the same series. In Game 1 of the World Series, he allowed a home run to eventual series MVP Pablo Sandoval.

Alburquerque threw 49 innings out of the Tiger bullpen in 2013, finishing with a 4.59 ERA. After allowing no home runs in 2011 and 2012, he surrendered five in 2013. In the Tigers 2013 postseason run, he pitched in 4 2/3 innings, allowing two earned runs and striking out nine batters.

==== 2014–2015 ====
Alburquerque pitched 57 1/3 innings of relief in 2014, posting a 2.51 ERA while striking out 63 batters. He walked a career-low 8.9 percent of batters faced.

On January 24, 2015, Alburquerque and the Tigers avoided arbitration agreeing on a one-year, $1.73 million contract. Alburquerque pitched a career-high 62 innings in relief in 2015, posting a 4–1 record and 4.21 ERA. He shared the major league lead in balks, with four.

On December 2, 2015, the Tigers non-tendered Alburquerque, making him a free agent.

=== Los Angeles Angels ===
On January 19, 2016, Alburquerque signed a 1-year, $1.1 million contract with the Los Angeles Angels. On March 29, the Angels optioned Alburquerque to the Triple-A Salt Lake Bees. In two games with the Angels, he appeared in two innings, posting a 4.50 ERA. He was designated for assignment on May 21. He was released on August 13.

=== Seattle Mariners ===
On August 23, 2016, Alburquerque signed a minor league contract with the Seattle Mariners. In six appearances for the Triple-A Tacoma Rainiers, he logged a 6.00 ERA with six strikeouts across six innings pitched. Alburquerque elected free agency following the season on November 7.

=== Kansas City Royals ===
On January 7, 2017, Alburquerque signed a minor league contract with the Kansas City Royals that included an invitation to spring training. The Royals promoted him to the major leagues on May 10. In 11 games with the Royals, he went 0–1 with a 3.60 ERA. He was released on July 29.

=== Chicago White Sox ===
On August 4, 2017, the Chicago White Sox signed Alburquerque to a minor league contract. In 10 games with the White Sox, he logged an 0–1 record with a 1.13 ERA with five strikeouts over eight innings of work. On December 1, Alburquerque was non-tendered by Chicago, making him a free agent.

=== Toronto Blue Jays ===
On January 18, 2018, Alburquerque signed a minor league contract with the Toronto Blue Jays. He pitched in 25 games for the Triple-A Buffalo Bisons before being released on July 2.

=== Acereros de Monclova ===
On February 26, 2019, Alburquerque signed with the Acereros de Monclova of the Mexican League. He made 52 appearances in 2019 for Monclova, posting a 1–1 record and 3.27 ERA with 38 strikeouts in 52 1/3 innings pitched. Alburquerque did not play in a game in 2020 due to the cancellation of the Mexican League season because of the COVID-19 pandemic.

In 2021, Alburquerque pitched to a 0–1 record with a 2.78 ERA in 24 relief appearances, striking out 26 in 22 2/3 innings of work. He was released by the Acereros following the season on August 26, 2021.

=== Long Island Ducks ===
On February 16, 2023, Alburquerque signed with the Long Island Ducks of the Atlantic League of Professional Baseball. In 50 relief outings, he recorded a 3.65 ERA with 47 strikeouts and 7 saves across 44 1/3 innings pitched.

=== Olmecas de Tabasco ===
On October 18, 2023, Alburquerque signed with the Olmecas de Tabasco of the Mexican League. In 20 relief appearances, he posted a 1–1 record with a 7.50 ERA and 16 strikeouts across 18 innings pitched in 2024. On July 1, 2024, Alburquerque was released by Tabasco.

=== Long Island Ducks (second stint) ===
On July 19, 2024, Alburquerque signed with the Long Island Ducks of the Atlantic League of Professional Baseball. In 21 appearances for the Ducks, he posted a 2–1 record and 3.66 ERA with 24 strikeouts and 2 saves across 19 2/3 innings of relief. Alburquerque became a free agent following the season.

On July 1, 2025, Alburquerque re-signed with Long Island. He made one appearance for the Ducks, failing to record an out after allowing two runs on one hit and three walks. Alburquerque was released by Long Island on July 12.

== Pitching style ==
Alburquerque is a three-pitch pitcher. He throws a hard four-seam fastball that ranges between 94 and 98 mph, and his "out pitch" is a downward-breaking slider that ranges between 85 and 88 mph. The slider is his most common pitch, especially with two strikes in the count; it has a 60% whiff rate, the fifth-highest for a slider among relief pitchers since the 2007 season. His best pitch is what scouts call the "Cross Curve" that "breaks this way, and then that way." His strikeouts per 9 innings pitched ratio is above the league average, sitting at 10.7 through the end of the 2017 season. He also has a high walk rate at 5.0 per 9 innings. Alburquerque was effective in the 2011 season at stranding inherited baserunners, allowing only 3 of 31 to score.
