= Luis Marte (pitcher) =

Dominican baseball player (born 1986)

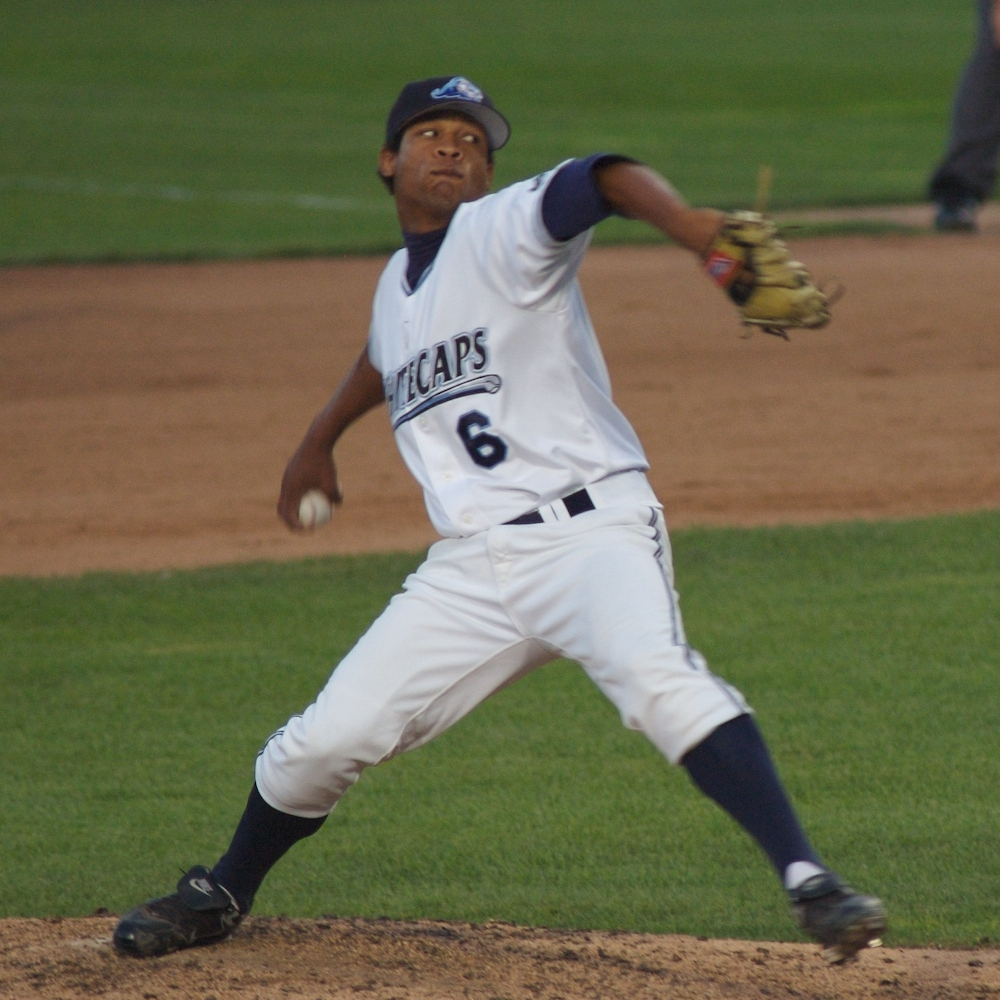
- Marte pitching for the West Michigan Whitecaps, single-A affiliates of the Detroit Tigers, in 2007
- Pitcher
- Born: August 26, 1986 (age 40); San Cristóbal, Dominican Republic
- Batted: Right Threw: Right

MLB debut
- September 1, 2011, for the Detroit Tigers

Last MLB appearance
- October 3, 2012, for the Detroit Tigers

MLB statistics
- Win–loss record: 2–0
- Earned run average: 2.77
- Strikeouts: 22
- Stats at Baseball Reference

Teams
- Detroit Tigers (2011–2012)

Luis Alfredo Marte (born August 26, 1986) is an American former professional baseball player. He played in Major League Baseball (MLB) for the Detroit Tigers.

== Career ==
=== Minor leagues ===
Marte was signed by the Detroit Tigers in 2005 at the age of 19. In 2006, he posted a 1.38 ERA while throwing 90 strikeouts in 60 innings for the Dominican Summer League Tigers.

In 2007, the Tigers promoted Marte to the rookie-level Gulf Coast League Tigers, where he went 2–0 with a 0.75 ERA in two starts. He was then moved to the Single-A West Michigan Whitecaps, where he posted a 2.83 ERA working primarily out of the bullpen.

Marte pitched at three levels in 2008, compiling a 1.98 ERA in seven starts for the Single-A Lakeland Flying Tigers. He was then promoted to the Double-A Erie SeaWolves, where he compiled a 5.05 ERA in ten starts for the Seawolves. Meanwhile, Marte's strikeout rate per nine innings went from 9.0 in Lakeland to 5.1 in Erie.

In 2009 for Erie, Marte posted a 4.02 ERA in 105 1/3 innings; he logged a 5.06 ERA in 48 innings at the same level in 2010. Marte rebounded nicely pitching for the Seawolves again in 2011, compiling a 3–0 record with a 1.70 ERA in 53 innings primarily out of the bullpen. He was also able to improve his strikeout per nine ratio to an impressive 11.55.

=== Major Leagues ===
Marte was promoted to the major leagues for the first time on September 1, 2011. For the remainder of the season, he compiled a 1–0 record with a 2.45 ERA in 3 2/3 innings of relief for the Tigers.

Marte was invited to spring training with the Tigers in March 2012, where he compiled a 2–0 record and a 2.08 ERA in nine Grapefruit League appearances. As a result, he was named to the Major League roster on March 30, 2012. However, the following Tuesday, during the Tigers final Grapefruit League game, Marte suffered a hamstring injury and was forced to start the season on the disabled list. Marte pitched in two rehab assignments before being activated off the 15-day DL on May 25; Luke Putkonen was optioned to Triple-A to make room.

Marte made 13 appearances for Triple-A Toledo in 2013, but struggled to a 1–2 record and 9.00 ERA with two strikeouts over two innings of work. On June 4, 2013, Marte underwent season-ending surgery to repair a right shoulder injury. On December 11, Marte was designated for assignment to make room on the 40-man roster for Rajai Davis. He cleared waivers on December 16 and was assigned to Toledo. Marte was released by the Tigers on March 12, 2014.
