= Casper Wells =

American baseball player (born 1984)

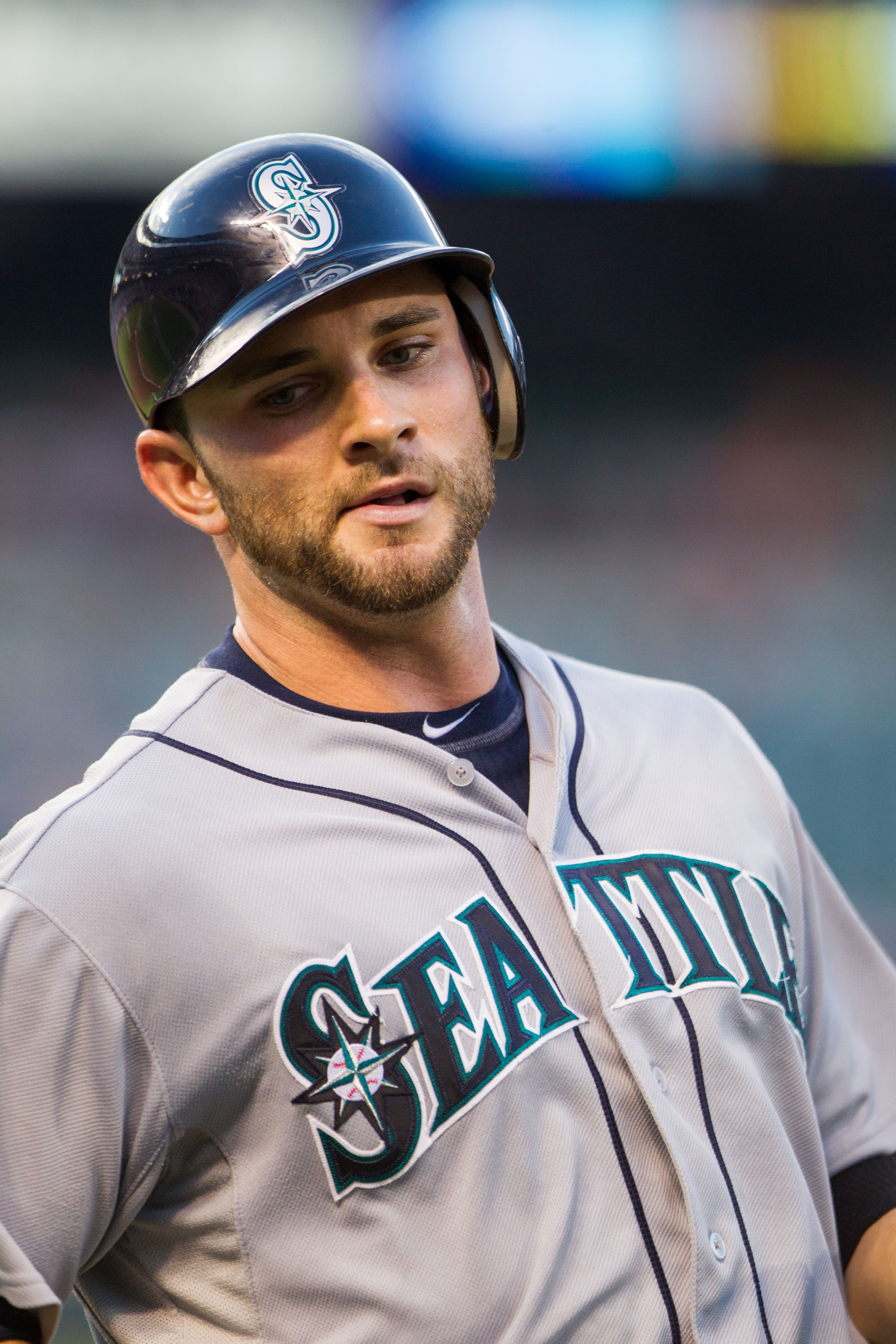
- Wells with the Seattle Mariners
- Outfielder
- Born: November 23, 1984 (age 41); Grand Rapids, Michigan, U.S.
- Batted: Right Threw: Right

MLB debut
- May 15, 2010, for the Detroit Tigers

Last MLB appearance
- September 28, 2013, for the Philadelphia Phillies

MLB statistics
- Batting average: .230
- Home runs: 25
- Runs batted in: 81
- Stats at Baseball Reference

Teams
- Detroit Tigers (2010–2011); Seattle Mariners (2011–2012); Oakland Athletics (2013); Chicago White Sox (2013); Philadelphia Phillies (2013)

Casper Charles Wells V (born November 23, 1984) is an American former professional baseball outfielder. He played in Major League Baseball for the Detroit Tigers, Seattle Mariners, Oakland Athletics, Chicago White Sox, and Philadelphia Phillies from 2010 to 2013. He played college baseball for the Towson Tigers before the Tigers selected him in the 2005 MLB draft.

== Amateur career ==
Wells attended Schenectady High School in Schenectady, New York and Towson University, where he played college baseball for the Towson Tigers. He was named to the All-Colonial Athletic Association team in 2004. He was the conference player of the year and named a second-team All-American by the American Baseball Coaches Association in 2005. He was also a pitcher in college, earning 3 saves in 2003 and going 6–0 with a 4.97 ERA as a starter in 2005.

== Professional career ==
=== Detroit Tigers ===
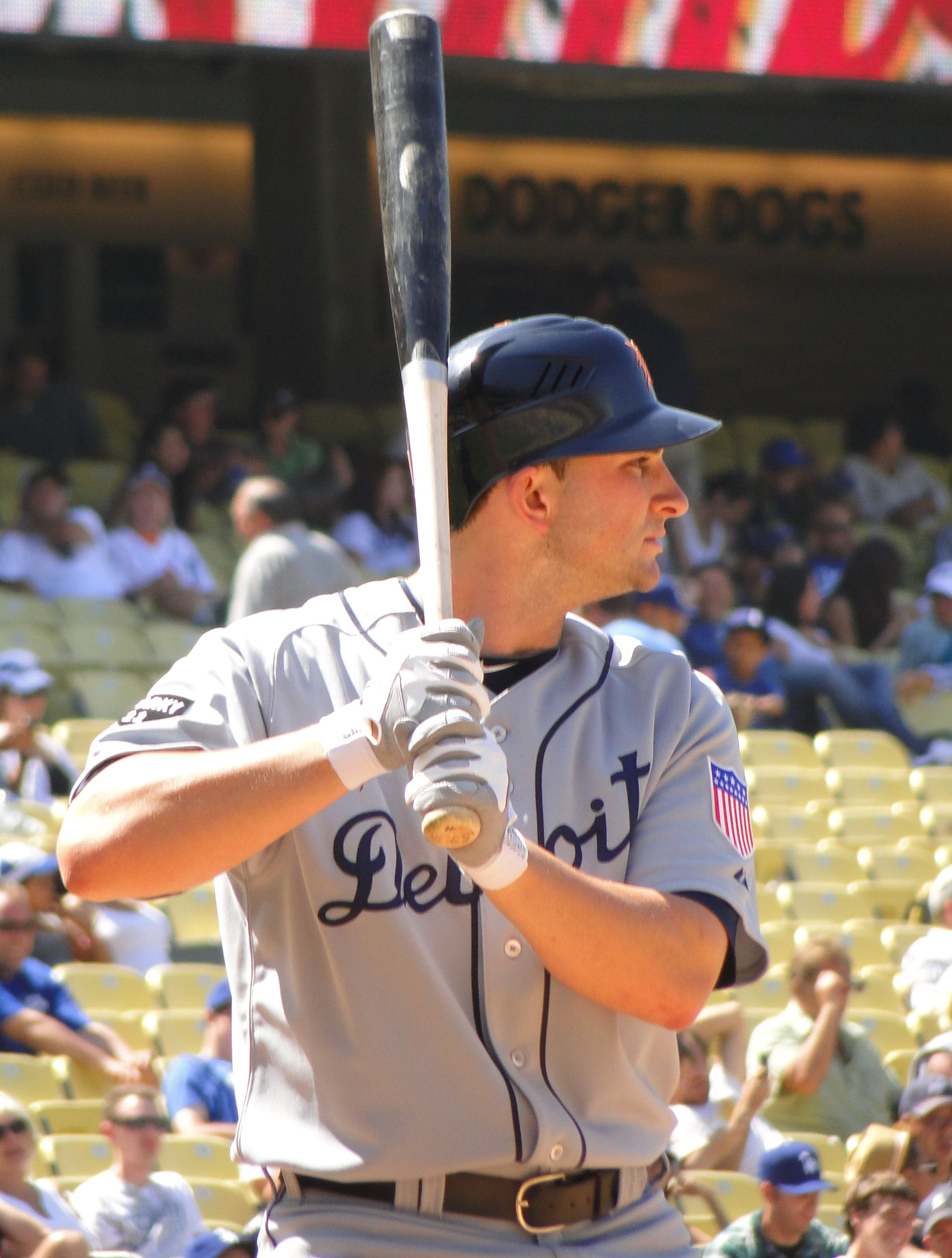
Wells at bat in Dodger Stadium

The Detroit Tigers selected Wells in the 14th round, with the 420th overall selection of the 2005 Major League Baseball draft. The Tigers promoted Wells to the major leagues on May 14, 2010, replacing pitcher Alfredo Figaro. Wells returned to Toledo on May 21 but was recalled to Detroit on August 23 in place of Enrique González.

=== Seattle Mariners ===
On July 30, 2011, Wells was traded to the Seattle Mariners along with LHP Charlie Furbush, prospect Francisco Martínez and a player to be named later (Chance Ruffin) for Doug Fister and David Pauley. Wells had early success at Seattle. He was able to put together a continuous streak of 4 games where he had a home run in each from August 13 through 16, 2011. The streak was halted when he was hit by a pitch in the nose by Brandon Morrow. In the second-half of 2011, he batted .216/.310/.431 with the Mariners.

Wells started 2012 with the Mariners but was demoted to the minors at the end of May, returning to Seattle in mid-June. In his only full season with Seattle, he batted .228/.302/.396 with 10 home runs, often serving as a right handed platoon bat.

Wells was designated for assignment by the Mariners on March 31, 2013. The Toronto Blue Jays claimed him off waivers on April 10. Toronto designated him for assignment on April 15 without appearing in a game to make room on the 40-man roster for Ramón Ortiz.

=== Oakland Athletics ===
Wells was traded to the Oakland Athletics on April 22, 2013 for cash. He was added to the active roster when second baseman Scott Sizemore re-tore his ACL. Wells was designated for assignment on April 28 when Yoenis Céspedes returned from the disabled list. Wells started only twice for the Athletics, one in left field and one as the designated hitter.

=== Chicago White Sox ===
On April 29, 2013, Wells was traded to the Chicago White Sox in exchange for cash considerations. In 38 games for Chicago, he batted .167/.225/.182 with no home runs and one RBI.

=== Philadelphia Phillies ===
On August 8, 2013, Wells was claimed off waivers by the Philadelphia Phillies. On August 24, after starting the night in right field, Wells pitched in the 18th inning of a game against the Arizona Diamondbacks, making him a position player to have pitched in both leagues in the same year. He was the losing pitcher, tabbed with a 27.08 ERA after giving up 5 runs to the Diamondbacks. Wells was also 0-for-7 batting that night. Wells appeared as a pinch runner the following day, but on August 27, he was placed on the disabled list with dry eye syndrome as a result of lasik surgery on his eyes. Wells returned to action for one at-bat as a pinch hitter in late September, in what was to be his final major league appearance. Wells was removed from the 40-man roster and sent outright to the Triple-A Lehigh Valley IronPigs on October 16. He elected free agency the following day.

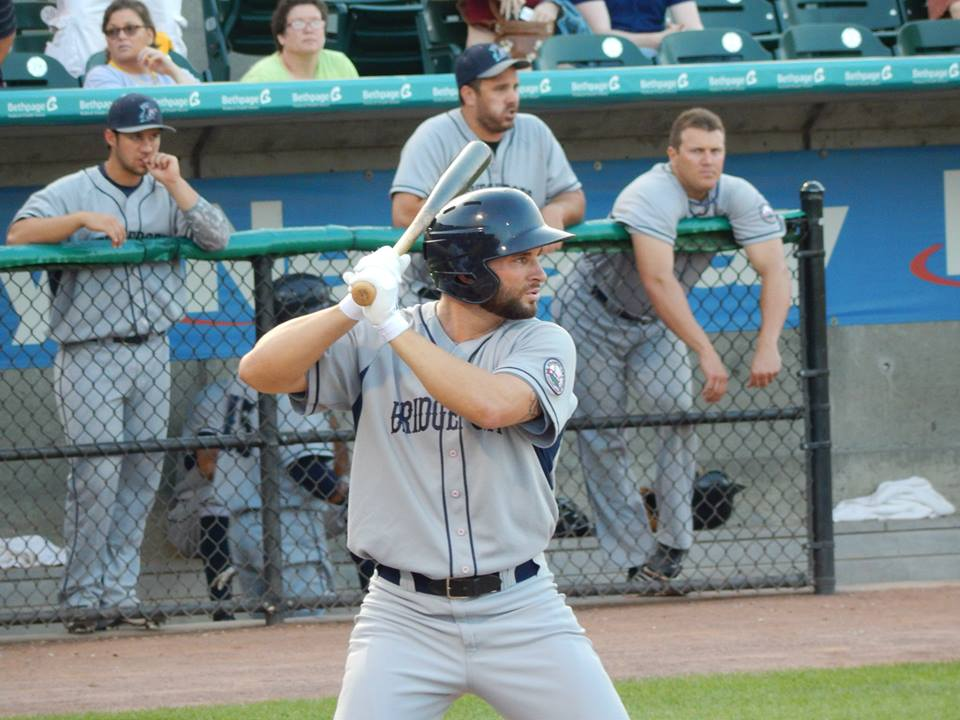
Wells playing for the Bridgeport Bluefish

=== Chicago Cubs ===
On November 20, 2013, Wells signed a minor league contract with the Chicago Cubs. On May 19, 2014, Wells joined the Chicago's Triple-A affiliate, the Iowa Cubs, following extended spring training. In 26 games for Iowa, he batted .197/.290/.230 with no home runs or RBI, and eight walks. Wells was released by the Cubs organization on June 25.

=== Bridgeport Bluefish ===
On July 18, 2014, Wells signed with the Bridgeport Bluefish of the Atlantic League. In 49 games for Bridgeport, he slashed .267/.338/.358 with two home runs, 19 RBI, and three stolen bases.

=== Detroit Tigers (second stint) ===
On February 21, 2015, the Detroit Tigers signed Wells to a minor league contract. In 15 games for the Double-A Erie SeaWolves, he hit .209/.292/.326 with one home run and six RBI. Wells was released by the Tigers organization on May 1.
