= 2010 Seattle Mariners season =

2010 Seattle Mariners
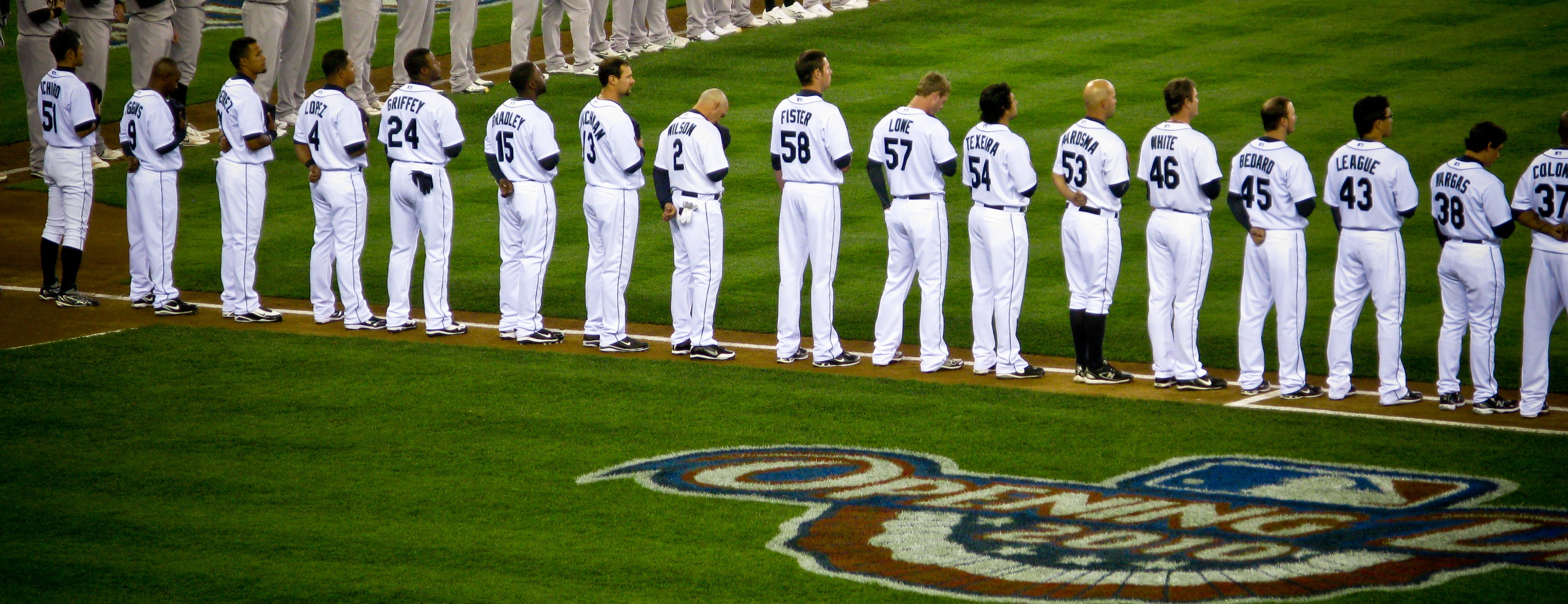
- The 2010 Seattle Mariners on Opening Day.
- League: American League
- Division: West
- Ballpark: Safeco Field
- City: Seattle, Washington
- Record: 61–101 (.377)
- Divisional place: 4th
- Owners: Satoru Iwata and Nintendo of America (represented by Howard Lincoln)
- General managers: Jack Zduriencik
- Managers: Don Wakamatsu, Daren Brown
- Television: Fox Sports Northwest (Dave Niehaus, Dave Sims, Mike Blowers)
- Radio: ESPN-710; Seattle Mariners Radio Network (Dave Niehaus, Rick Rizzs)

The 2010 Seattle Mariners season was the 34th season in franchise history. The Mariners finished the season with 61 wins and 101 losses. As the Texas Rangers won their first pennant that season, the Mariners became one of only two teams to have never played in the World Series, along with the Washington Nationals. The Nationals, however, eventually made it to, and won, the World Series 9 years later, leaving the Mariners as the sole franchise to have not played in the Fall Classic.

== Offseason ==
=== Coaching staff changes ===
Most of the 2009 major league coaching staff was retained, with the exception of third base coach Bruce Hines. Mike Brumley was named the new third base coach on October 30, 2009. On December 7, the Mariners announced their minor league staff. Eriberto Menchaca, who managed the Class-A Clinton LumberKings in 2009, was moved to the rookie-level Pulaski Mariners, Jesus Azuaje was named manager of the rookie-level Peoria Mariners, Tim Laker was named the manager of the Double-A West Tenn Diamond Jaxx, and Andy Fox was named hitting coach for the Diamond Jaxx.

=== Roster changes ===
==== Key departures ====
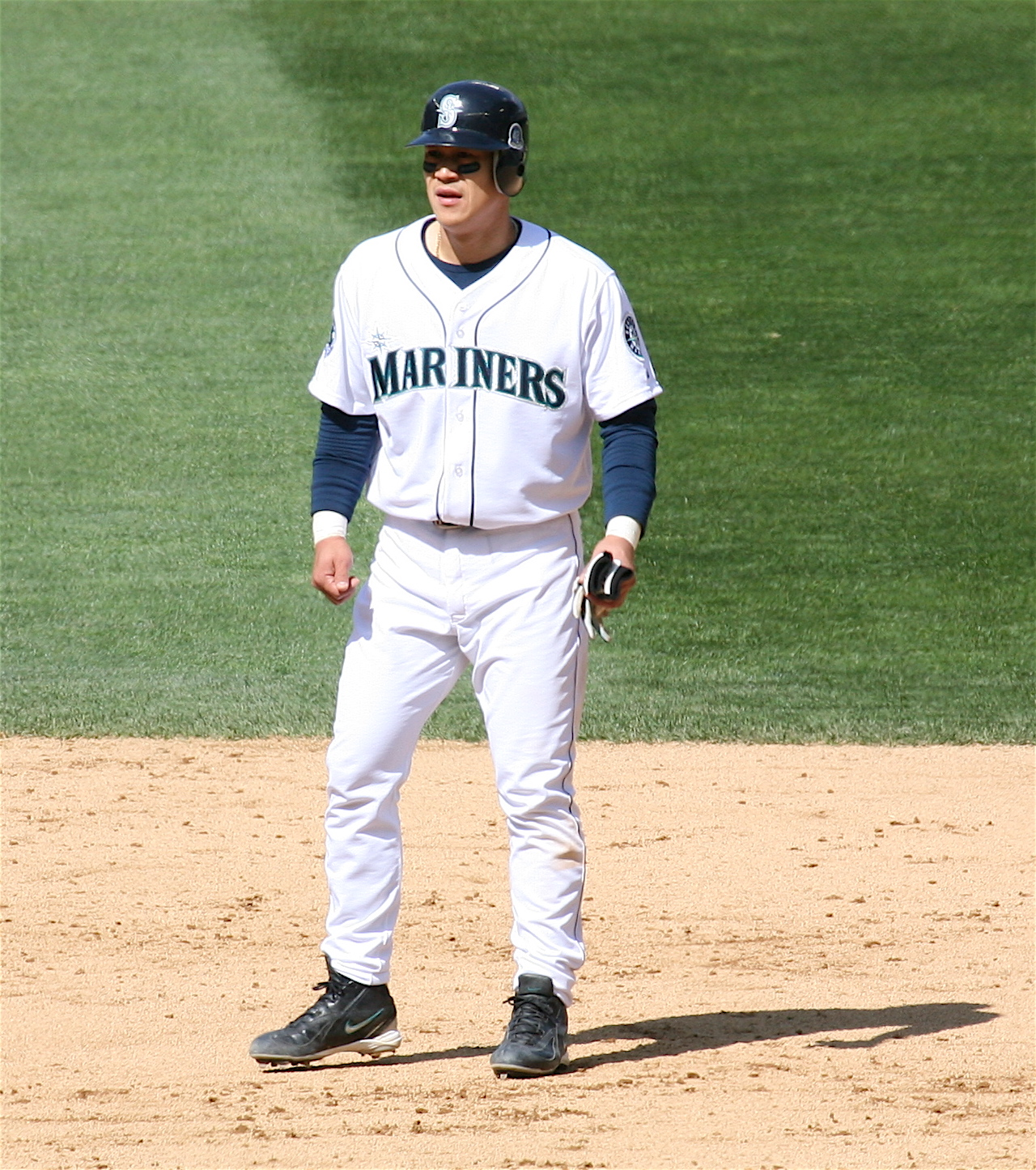
Kenji Johjima returned to play professional baseball in Japan after a three-year stint in MLB.

On October 19, 2009, catcher Kenji Johjima, the first Japanese-born catcher in Major League Baseball, exercised an opt-out clause in his contract and returned to playing in Nippon Professional Baseball. The Mariners also lost their home run leader, Russell Branyan, who declined a one-year deal with the Mariners to test the free agent market. Two-time Gold Glove winner Adrián Beltré opted for free agency on November 5, 2009, and later signed with the Boston Red Sox. The third baseman declined $12 million in arbitration from the Mariners only days after the team signed Chone Figgins (see below). Beltre officially parted ways with the Mariners when he signed a one-year, $9 million deal with the Boston Red Sox. Pitcher Phillippe Aumont, noted as one of the top prospects in the organization, was sent to the Phillies in the trade for Cliff Lee. Also, pitcher Brandon Morrow was traded to the Toronto Blue Jays as well. Carlos Silva, whose time in Seattle was plagued by injury, was traded to the Chicago Cubs on December 18.

==== Major league acquisitions ====
Chone Figgins signed a four-year contract valued at $36 million. General manager Jack Zduriencik noted Figgins' versatility on defense and could ask him to play second base as well.

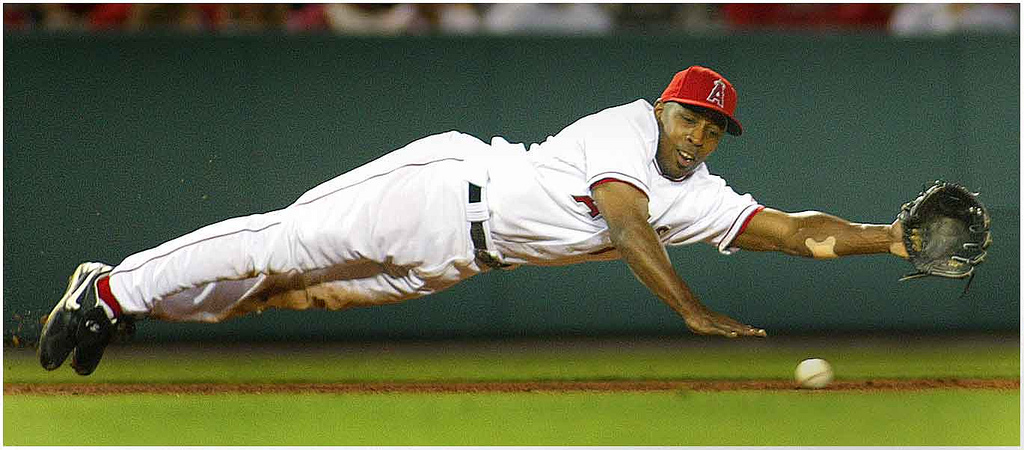
Chone Figgins signed a four-year contract with the Mariners during the off-season.

Ken Griffey Jr. returned to the Mariners with a one-year deal after a successful 2009 season and large number of Seattle fans asking for "one more year." Shortstop Jack Wilson signed a two-year, $10 million deal to remain in Seattle. Wilson was one of the players received from the Pittsburgh Pirates at the trading deadline in 2009.

On December 14, 2009, the Mariners, along with the three other organizations including the Philadelphia Phillies, the Toronto Blue Jays, and the Oakland Athletics agreed to a 4-team, 9-player deal. The Mariners received former Cy Young Award winner Cliff Lee from Philadelphia in exchange for three prospects as a complement to ace Félix Hernández.

On December 18, 2009, the Mariners traded pitcher Carlos Silva and cash considerations to the Chicago Cubs for outfielder Milton Bradley, particularly noting his offensive capabilities. On December 22, the Mariners traded Brandon Morrow to the Toronto Blue Jays for pitcher Brandon League, and a minor league prospect. The Mariners acquired first baseman Casey Kotchman from the Boston Red Sox in exchange for utility player Bill Hall, a player to be named later, and cash considerations. On January 29, 2010, the Mariner signed outfielder Eric Byrnes to a one-year, $400,000 contract after he was released by the Arizona Diamondbacks. The Mariners signed first baseman Ryan Garko to a one-year $550,000 contract on February 1. On February 6, the Mariners re-signed pitcher Érik Bédard to a one-year, $1.5 million contract, with a mutual option for 2011.

==== Minor league acquisitions ====
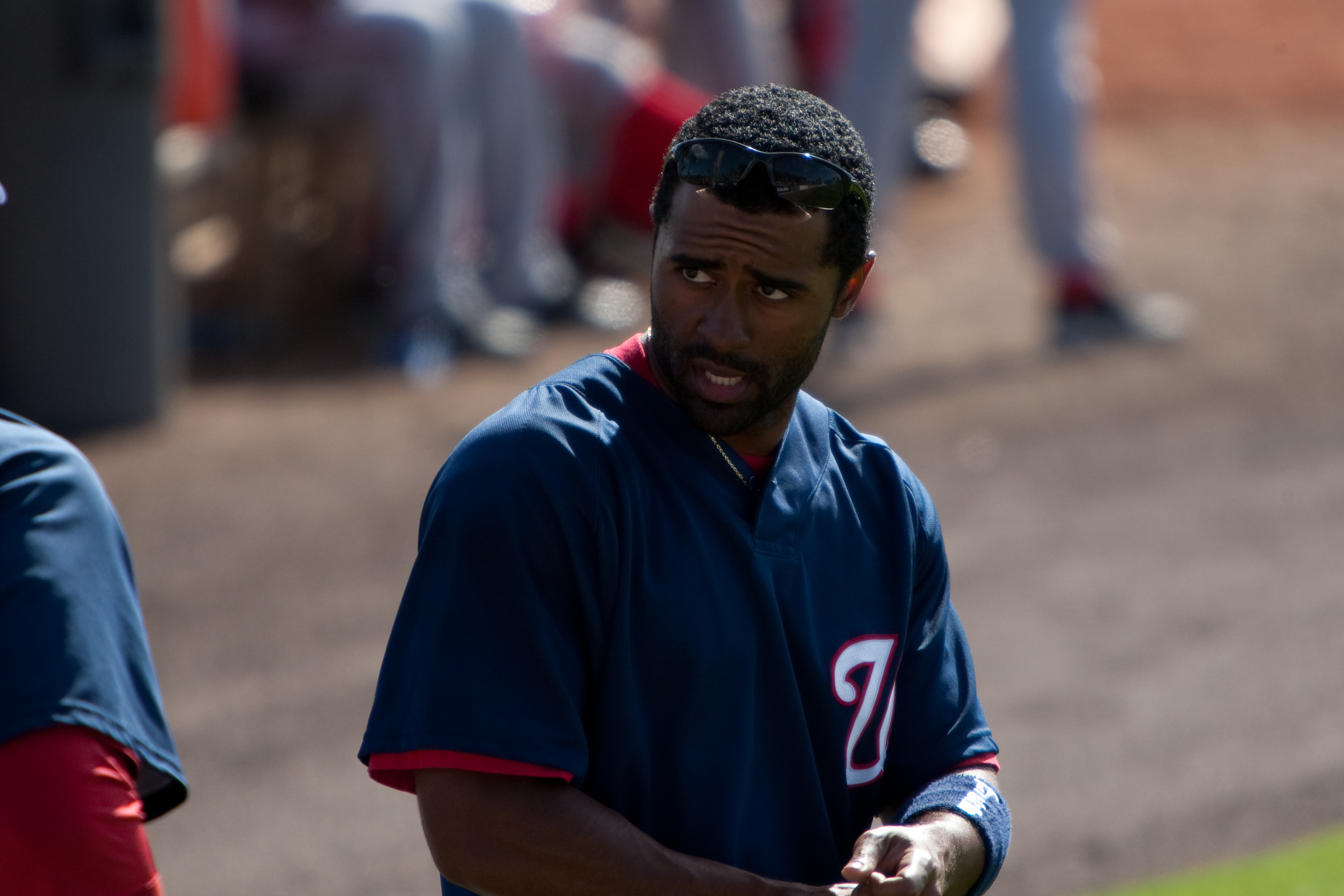
Corey Patterson signed a minor league contract with the Mariners on December 9, 2009.

After the World Series, the Mariners cleared five spots from their 40-man roster after infielder Bryan LaHair, pitchers César Jiménez, Randy Messenger and Marwin Vega were outrighted to the Triple-A Tacoma Rainiers, and pitcher Justin Thomas was claimed off waivers by the Pittsburgh Pirates. The Mariners added seven new scouts after the season including the West Coast Supervisor Butch Baccala, Southern California scout John Ramey, Northwest scout Joe Ross, Midwest scout Tony Russo, Southwest scout Jess Kapellusch, Atlantic scout Mike Moriarty, and Gulf Coast scout Devitt Moore.

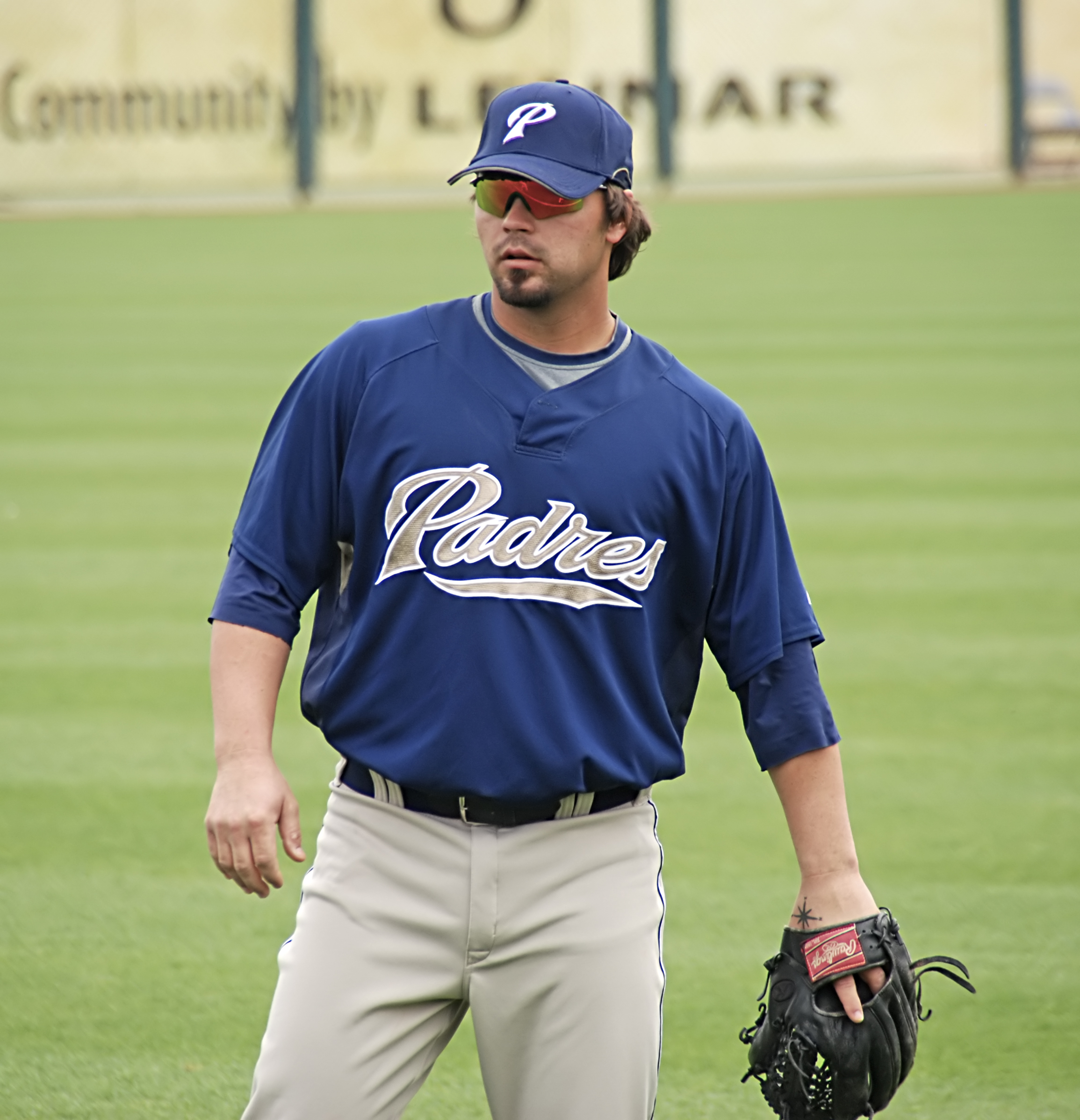
Travis Denker signed a minor league contract with the Mariners in December 2009.

On November 25, the Mariners re-signed minor league pitchers Steve Bray and Steven Shell, and catcher José Yépez. On December 9, the Mariners signed outfielder Corey Patterson to a minor league contract with an invitation to spring training. It was reported by Baseball America that the Mariners signed pitcher Levale Speigner and infielder Travis Denker, and also re-signed pitcher Chris Seddon and Josh Wilson to minor league contracts on December 12. On December 16, the Mariners signed 19-year-old Brazilian prospect Pedro Okuda to a minor league contract. During the trade for Cliff Lee, the Mariners gave up three prospects including pitchers Phillippe Aumont and J. C. Ramírez and outfielder Tyson Gillies.

On December 22, Baseball America reported that the Mariners re-signed pitcher Mike Koplove, and signed pitcher David Pauley, and catcher Ralph Henriquez Jr. During the trade for Brandon League, the Mariners also acquired minor league outfielder Johermyn Chávez from the Blue Jays. On December 28, the Mariners signed catcher Josh Bard, and re-signed pitcher Chad Cordero to minor league contracts with invitations to spring training. The Mariners signed free agent utility player Chris Woodward, who was in their organization during the first half of the 2009 season, to a minor league contract with an invitation to spring training. On January 13, the Mariners re-signed first baseman Brad Nelson to a minor league contract with and invitation to spring training. Formerly of the Milwaukee Brewers organization, Jesús Colomé signed a minor league contract with an invitation to spring training with the Mariners on February 10. On February 12, 2010, the Mariners signed Mike Sweeney, a player who MLB.com called a "key clubhouse component from the Mariners' dramatic 2009 turnaround", to a minor league contract with an invitation to spring training.

Baseball America's Top 10 Prospects: Seattle Mariners
Rank	Player	Position
1	Dustin Ackley	Second baseman
2	Michael Saunders	Outfielder
3	Adam Moore	Catcher
4	Alex Liddi	Third baseman
5	Carlos Triunfel	Infielder
6	Michael Pineda	Right-handed pitcher
7	Nick Franklin	Shortstop
8	Greg Halman	Outfielder
9	Dan Cortes	Right-handed pitcher
10	Mario Martínez	Corner infielder

=== Minor league rankings ===
During the offseason, MLB.com ranked Mariners' first round draft Dustin Ackley as the 15th best prospect in Minor League Baseball. Ackley was also named the best prospect in the Mariners' organization by Baseball America, followed by outfielder Michael Saunders, catcher Adam Moore, third baseman Alex Liddi, infielder Carlos Triunfel, pitcher Michael Pineda, shortstop Nick Franklin, outfielder Greg Halman, pitcher Dan Cortes, and corner infielder Mario Martínez. Baseball America also ranked players by their specific talents. Ackley was named best hitter for average, Halman was named best hitter for power, and best athlete, outfielder Ezequiel Carrera was named both best strike-zone discipline, and fastest base runner, Pineda was named as having the best fastball, and the best control of pitches, pitcher Josh Fields was named as having the best curveball, pitcher Steven Hensley was named as having the best slider, pitcher Nick Hill was named as having the best changeup, Steve Baron was named the best defensive catcher, Gabriel Noriega was named the best defensive infielder, Triunfel was named as having the best throwing arm amongst infielders, Saunders was named best defensive outfielder, and James Jones was named as the having the best throwing arm amongst outfielders.

=== Salary arbitration ===
Five Mariners' players filed for salary arbitration in January 2010. The list of filers included pitchers David Aardsma, Félix Hernández, Brandon League and Mark Lowe, and first baseman Casey Kotchman. On January 18, Aardsma, Hernández and Lowe signed new contracts with the Mariners, avoiding arbitration. Aardsma signed a deal for $2.75 million, and Lowe signed a deal worth $1.15 million. Hernández's five-year deal was worth $80 million. On January 20, the Mariners came to an agreement with League for a one-year $900,000 deal, avoiding arbitration. Kotchman, the last arbitration eligible player on the Mariners roster, agreed to a $3.5 million contract on February 3, avoiding arbitration, and settling all the Mariners' arbitration cases.

== Complete transactions ==
- Source for official major league transactions

=== 2009 ===
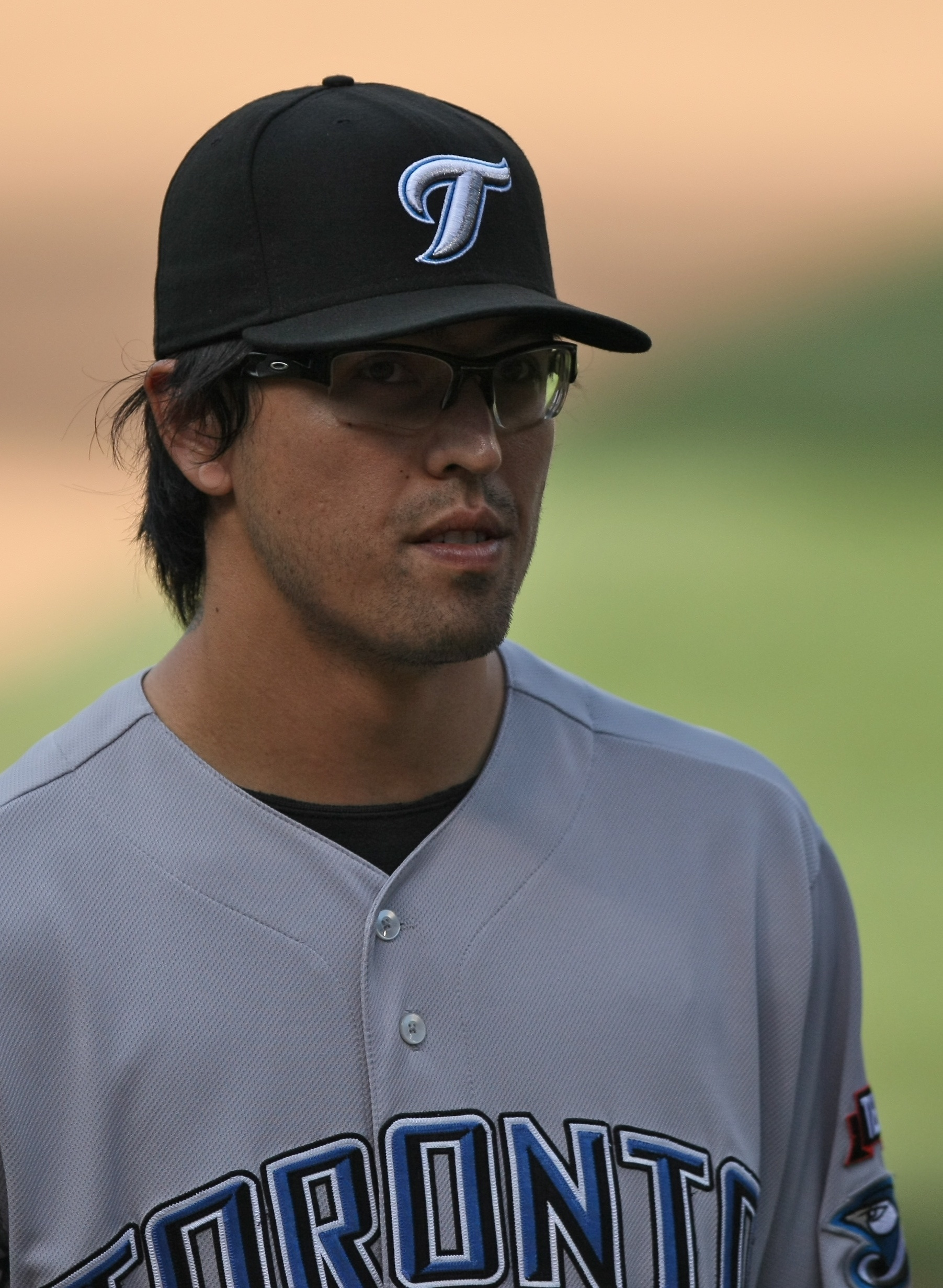
Brandon League was acquired from the Toronto Blue Jays on December 23.

==== October ====
- October 19: Justin Thomas designated for assignment. Ten days later, he was claimed by the Pittsburgh Pirates off waivers.
- October 29: Outrighted pitchers César Jiménez, Randy Messenger and Marwin Vega, and first baseman Bryan LaHair to the Triple-A Tacoma Rainiers.

==== November ====
- November 4: Claimed Yusmeiro Petit off waivers from the Arizona Diamondbacks.
- November 20: Pitcher Chris Jakubauskas claimed off waivers by the Pittsburgh Pirates.
  - Pitcher Robert Manuel claimed off waivers by the Boston Red Sox.
  - Called-up pitchers Dan Cortes, Ricky Orta, Edward Paredes, J. C. Ramírez and Anthony Varvaro.
  - Outrighted infielder Josh Wilson to Triple-A Tacoma.
  - Activated pitchers Ryan Feierabend and Sean White from the disabled list.
  - Signed catcher Eliézer Alfonzo to a minor league contract.

==== December ====
- December 8: Signed third baseman Chone Figgins to a four-year, $36 million contract.
- December 10: Signed center fielder Corey Patterson to a minor league contract.
  - Selected pitcher Kanekoa Texeira from the New York Yankees in the Rule 5 draft.
  - Re-signed shortstop Jack Wilson to a two-year, $10 million contract.
- December 16: Signed shortstop Pedro Okuda to a minor league contract.
  - Traded pitchers J. C. Ramírez and Phillippe Aumont and outfielder Tyson Gillies to the Philadelphia Phillies for pitcher Cliff Lee.
- December 18: Re-signed outfielder Ryan Langerhans to a minor league contract.
  - Traded pitcher Carlos Silva to the Chicago Cubs for outfielder Milton Bradley.
- December 23: Traded pitcher Brandon Morrow to the Toronto Blue Jays for pitcher Brandon League and outfielder Johermyn Chávez.
- December 28: Signed catcher Josh Bard and pitcher Chad Cordero to minor league contracts.

=== 2010 ===
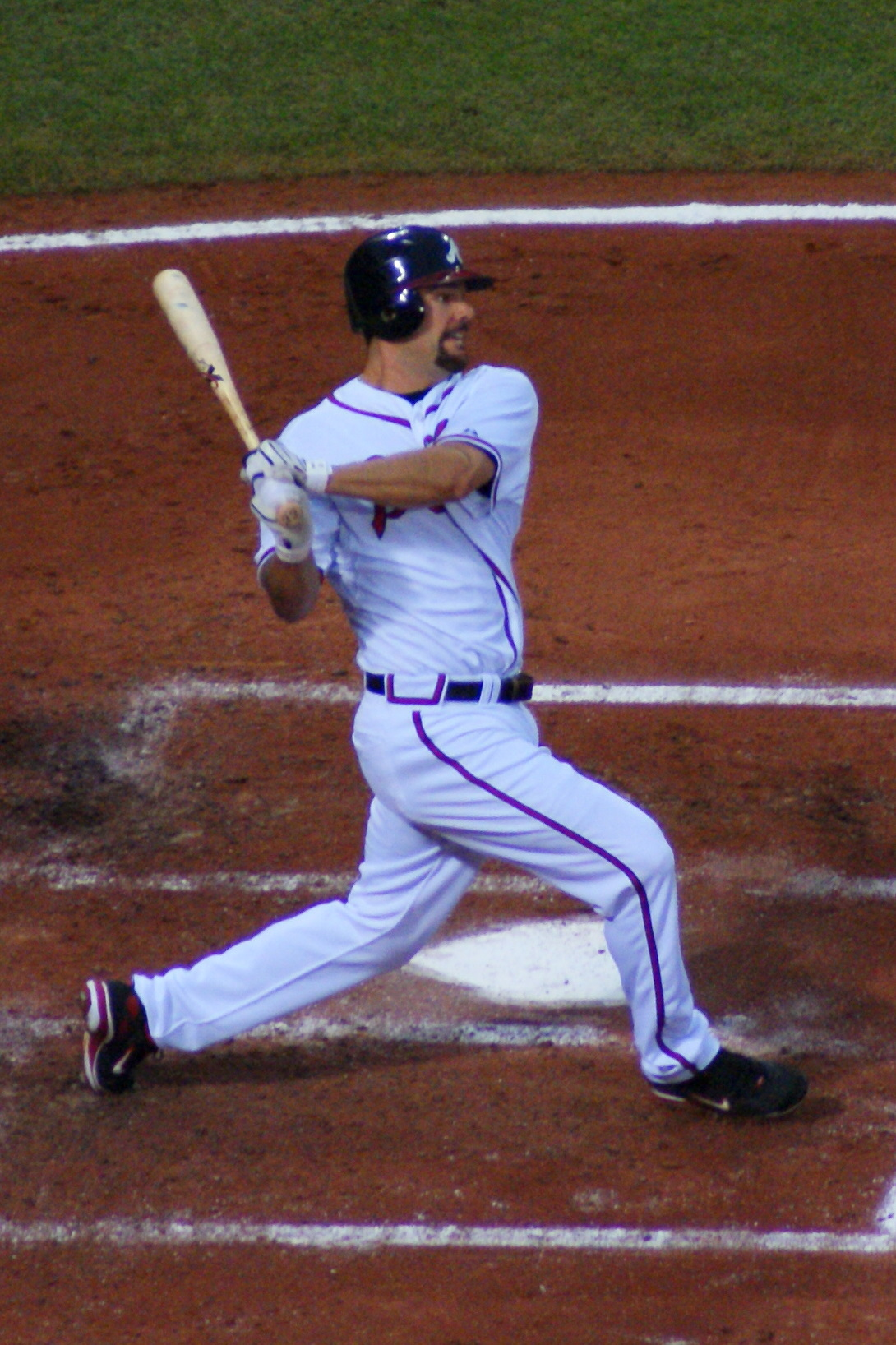
Seattle acquired first baseman Casey Kotchman in a trade on January 7.

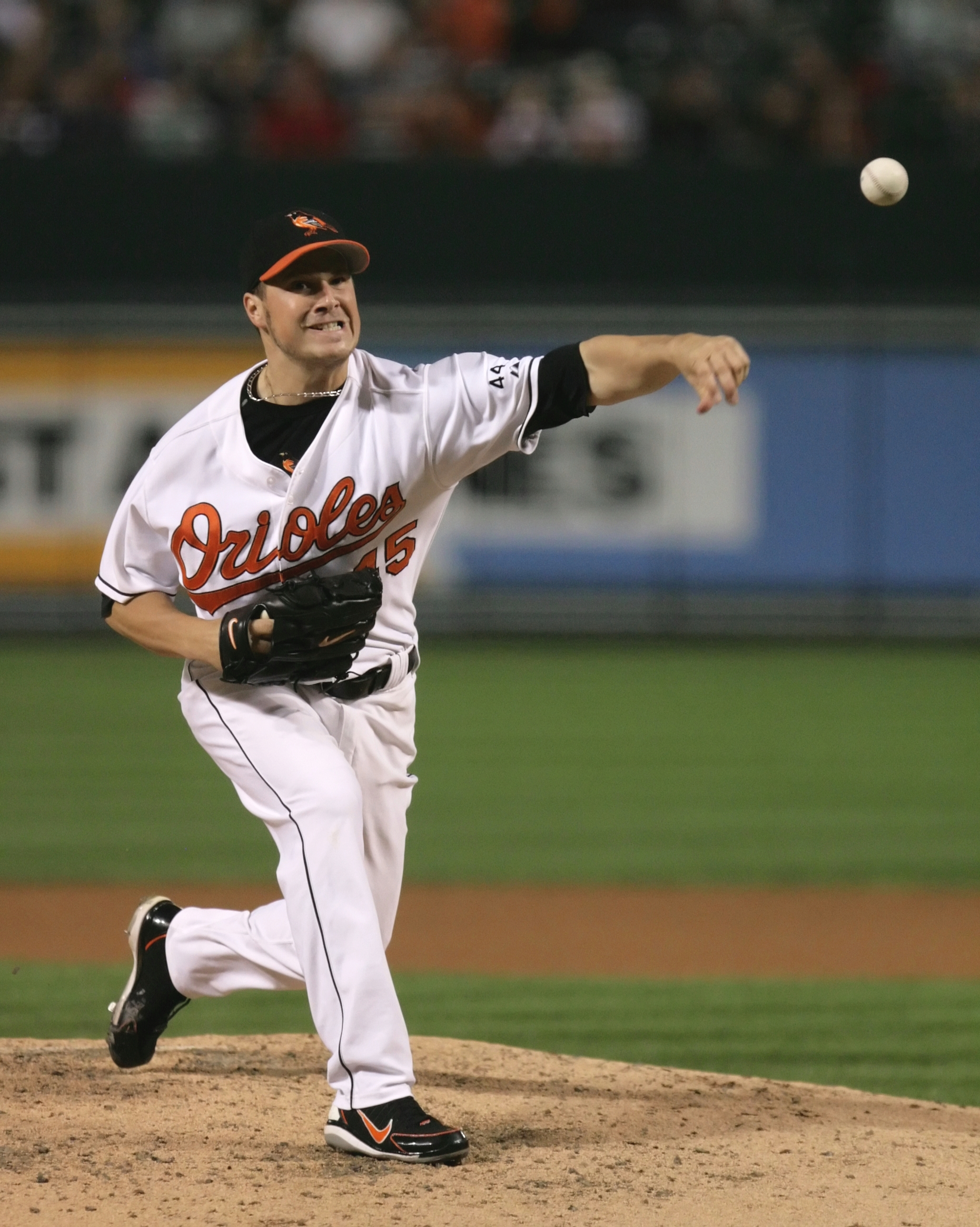
Érik Bédard (pictured with the Baltimore Orioles) was re-signed by the Mariners.

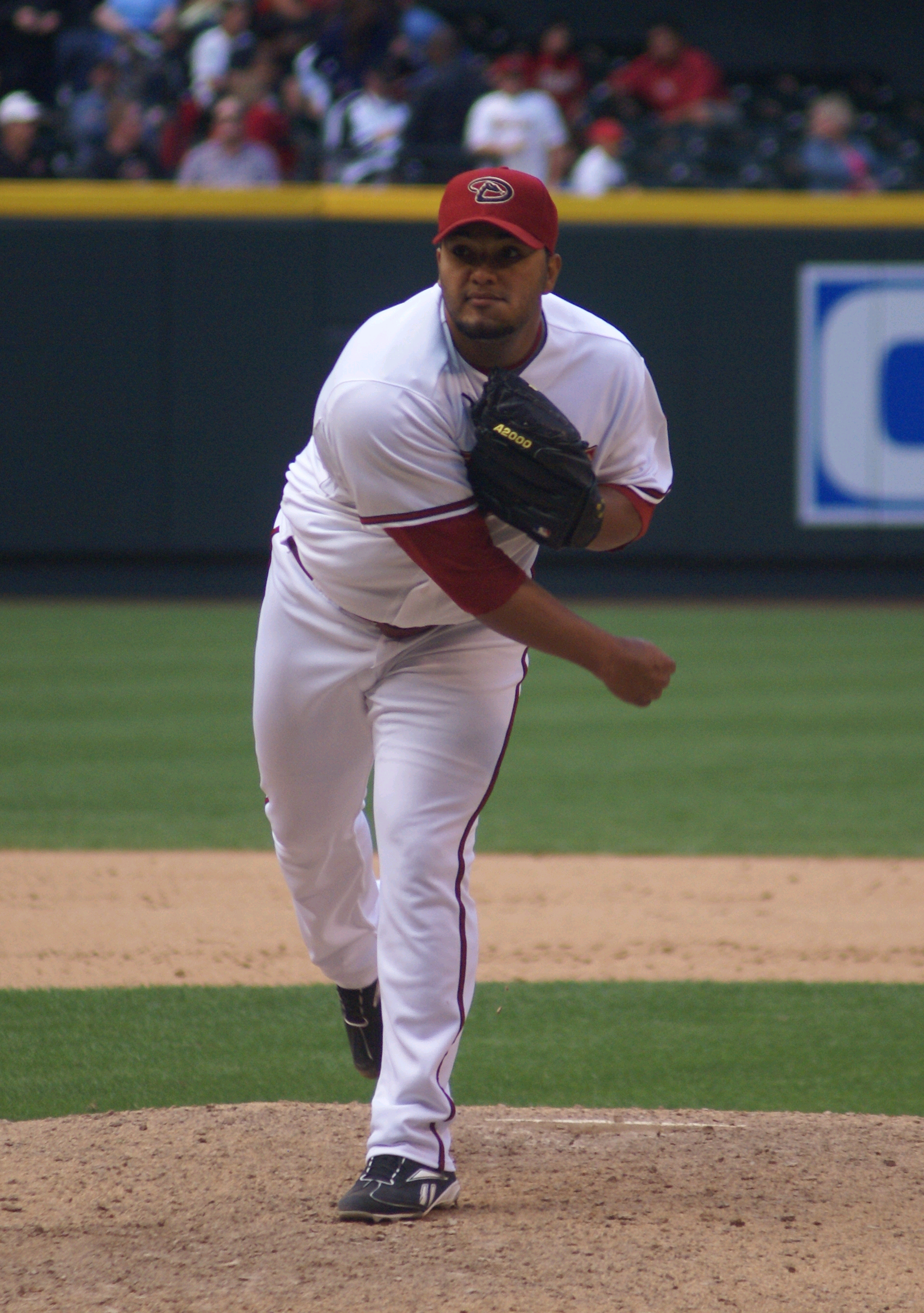
On March 17, 2010, the Mariners released Yusmeiro Petit, however, they signed him to a minor league contract 10 days later.

==== January ====
- January 6: Signed outfielder Chris Woodward to a minor league contract.
- January 7: Traded utility player Bill Hall to the Boston Red Sox for first baseman Casey Kotchman.
- January 13: Re-signed first baseman Brad Nelson to a minor league contract.
- January 15: Claimed first baseman Tommy Everidge off of waivers from the Oakland Athletics.
- January 29: Signed outfielder Eric Byrnes to a one-year $400,000 contract.
  - First baseman Tommy Everidge designated for assignment.

==== February ====
- February 1: Signed first baseman Ryan Garko to a one-year, $550,000 contract.
  - Pitcher Pitcher Gaby Hernandez designated for assignment.
- February 3: Outrighted first baseman Tommy Everidge to the Triple-A Tacoma Rainiers.
- February 6: Re-signed pitcher Érik Bédard to a one-year, $1.5 million contract.
  - Pitcher Pitcher Yusmeiro Petit designated for assignment.
- February 10: Signed pitcher Jesús Colomé to a minor league contract with an invitation to spring training.
  - Pitcher Yusmeiro Petit outrighted to the Triple-A Tacoma Rainiers.
  - Pitcher Gaby Hernandez claimed off waivers by the Boston Red Sox.
- February 12: Signed designated hitter Mike Sweeney to a minor league contract with an invitation to spring training.

==== March ====
- March 3: Pitchers Kenn Kasparek and Anthony Vasquez assigned to the Mariners.
- March 4: Pitchers James Gillheeney and Erasmo Ramirez; shortstop Carlos Triunfel; and Kyle Seager assigned to the Mariners.
- March 5: Pitchers Andrew Carraway and Michael Pineda; and shortstop Juan Díaz assigned to the Mariners.
- March 6: Pitchers Aaron Jensen and Steve Bray; shortstop Nick Franklin; and third baseman Alex Liddi assigned to the Mariners.
- March 8: Catchers Ralph Henriquez and Hassiel Jimenez; third baseman Matt Mangini; and outfielders James Jones and Denny Almonte assigned to the Mariners.
- March 10: Optioned pitcher Ryan Feierabend to the Triple-A Tacoma Rainiers.
- March 11: Pitchers Kyle Parker and Wes Littleton; and outfielders Maximo Mendez and Johermyn Chávez assigned to the Mariners.
- March 12: Pitcher Andrew Baldwin assigned to the Mariners.
- March 13: Optioned outfielder Greg Halman to the Triple-A Tacoma Rainiers.
  - Infielder Joseph Dunigan assigned to the Mariners.
- March 14: Third baseman Mario Martinez and outfielder Carlos Peguero assigned to the Mariners.
- March 16: Optioned pitchers Dan Cortes, Ricky Orta, Edward Paredes and Anthony Varvaro; and infielder Dustin Ackley to the Double-A West Tenn Diamond Jaxx.
  - Optioned outfielder Ezequiel Carrera to the Triple-A Tacoma Rainiers.
- March 17: Released pitcher Yusmeiro Petit.
- March 18: Signed second baseman Travis Denker.
  - Pitcher Marwin Vega assigned to the Mariners.
  - Optioned outfielder Michael Saunders to the Triple-A Tacoma Rainiers.
  - Traded pitcher Miguel Celestino to the Boston Red Sox.
- March 20: Infielders Shaver Hansen and Gabriel Noriega; and outfielder Welington Dotel assigned to the Mariners.
- March 21: Shortstop Jeffrey Dominguez and outfielder Johan Limonta assigned to the Mariners.
- March 22: Outfielder Daniel Carroll assigned to the Mariners.
- March 23: Pitcher Steven Richard assigned to the Mariners.
- March 24: Catcher Brandon Bantz assigned to the Mariners.
- March 25: Pitchers Preston Vancil and Nick Czyz; catcher Blake Ochoa; infielder Edilio Colina; and outfielders Kalian Sams and Kuo Hui Lo assigned to the Mariners.
  - Optioned first baseman Mike Carp to the Triple-A Tacoma Rainiers.
- March 27: Pitcher Steven Hensley assigned to the Mariners.
- March 29: Pitcher Chris Kirkland assigned to the Mariners.
- March 31: Outfielder Corey Patterson filed for free agency.
  - Pitcher Brian Moran and James McOwen to the Mariners.
  - Optioned Luke French to the Triple-A Tacoma Rainiers.
  - Placed pitcher Érik Bédard on the 15-Day disabled list retroactive to March 26, 2010.
  - Placed third baseman Jack Hannahan on the 15-Day disabled list retroactive to March 26, 2010.

==== April ====
- April 1: First baseman Ryan Garko was claimed by the Texas Rangers.
  - Optioned Garrett Olson to the Triple-A Tacoma Rainiers.
  - Pitcher Seon Gi Kim assigned to the Mariners.
- April 4: Placed pitcher Cliff Lee on the 15-Day disabled list retroactive to March 26, 2010.
  - Pitcher Yusmeiro Petit and outfielder Corey Patterson assigned to the Mariners.
  - Called-up Mike Sweeney from the Triple-A Tacoma Rainiers.
- April 5: Catchers José Yépez and Luis Oliveros assigned to the Double-A West Tenn Diamond Jaxx.
  - Outfielder Maximo Mendez assigned to the Class-A Advanced High Desert Mavericks.
  - Outfielder Kalian Sams assigned to the Class-A Clinton LumberKings.
- April 7: Pitchers Mike Koplove, Chris Seddon, Steven Shell, Steve Bray, Chad Cordero, Jesús Colomé, David Pauley and Levale Speigner; catchers Eliézer Alfonzo and Josh Bard; and infielders Brad Nelson, Josh Wilson and Chris Woodward assigned to the Triple-A Tacoma Rainiers.

== Spring training ==
=== Non-roster invitees ===
Seattle invited 23 players to spring training including catchers Eliézer Alfonzo, Josh Bard, Steven Baron, Luis Oliveros and Guillermo Quiróz, infielders Tommy Everidge, Brad Nelson, Josh Wilson and Chris Woodward, outfielders Corey Patterson and Mike Wilson, designated hitter Mike Sweeney, and pitchers Jesús Colomé, Chad Cordero, Josh Fields, Nick Hill, Mike Koplove, David Pauley, Yusmeiro Petit, Mauricio Robles, Chris Seddon, Steven Shell and Levale Speigner.

=== Injuries ===
On February 8, newly acquired pitcher Cliff Lee underwent minor surgery to remove a floating bone spur in his left foot. Lee was expected to be out two-to-three weeks, making him unable to report to spring training at the scheduled time. On March 4, closer David Aardsma experienced tightness in his groin causing him to miss playing time. Shortstop Jack Wilson suffered from right hamstring tightness after a Mariners' game in early March. On March 19, it was announced that pitcher Cliff Lee could start the season on the disabled list because of a right lower abdominal strain. At the end of spring training, Lee was placed on the 15-day disabled list for the aforementioned reason. On April 3, Mariners' minor leaguer James McOwen dislocated his shoulder while attempting to catch a ball hit by Clint Barmes.

=== Roster moves ===
On March 10, 2010, the Mariners cut 10 people from their spring roster including Ryan Feierabend, Josh Fields, Steven Shell, Nick Hill, Chris Seddon, Mauricio Robles, Luis Oliveros and Steven Baron. On March 17, the Mariners released pitcher Yusmeiro Petit whom they had claimed off waivers on November 4, 2009. Michael Saunders, an outfielder who played limited time with the Mariners in 2009, was optioned to the Triple-A Tacoma Rainiers on March 18. On March 18, the Mariners traded minor league pitcher Miguel Celestino to the Boston Red Sox to complete the trade for Casey Kotchman. First baseman Mike Carp was assigned to minor league camp on March 25, and was informed that he would start the season with the Triple-A Tacoma Rainiers. On March 31, outfielder Corey Patterson opted out of his contract with the Mariners and field for free agency. Also on March 31, the Mariners assigned pitcher Chad Cordero to minor league camp, and optioned Luke French to the Triple-A Tacoma Rainiers.

== Regular season ==
=== Overview ===
Retired pitcher Randy Johnson agreed to throw out the ceremonial first pitch before the home opener at Safeco Field. Johnson, who spent 10 seasons in Seattle, reportedly accepted the request immediately. In the first game of the seasons against the Oakland Athletics at Oakland–Alameda County Coliseum, the Mariners won by a score of 5–3. Seattle reliever Brandon League got the win while Oakland reliever Brad Ziegler got the loss. On August 9 manager Don Wakamatsu was dismissed as manager and Daren Brown was named his replacement on an interim basis. The Mariners ended the season scoring only 513 runs, the lowest since the American League (AL) instituted the designated hitter in 1973. The Mariners were also last in the AL in team batting average at .236 and also ranked last in most other offensive categories this season.

=== Game log ===
Legend
	Mariners win
	Mariners loss
	Postponement
**Bold**	Mariners team member

2010 game log: 61–101
April: 11–12 (home: 7–3; road: 4–9)

#	Date	Opponent	Score	Win	Loss	Save	Attendance	Record	Boxscore
1	April 5	@ Athletics	5–3	**League** (1–0)	Ziegler (0–1)	**Aardsma** (1)	30,686	1–0	
2	April 6	@ Athletics	1–2	E. Ramírez (1–0)	**Texeira** (0–1)	—	10,090	1–1	
3	April 7	@ Athletics	5–6	Blevins (1–0)	**Lowe** (0–1)	—	18,194	1–2	
4	April 8	@ Athletics	2–6	Anderson (1–0)	**Fister** (0–1)	—	12,464	1–3	
5	April 9	@ Rangers	2–6	Lewis (1–0)	**Vargas** (0–1)	—	25,271	1–4	
6	April 10	@ Rangers	4–3	**Lowe** (1–1)	Francisco (1–2)	**Aardsma** (2)	26,861	2–4	
7	April 11	@ Rangers	2–9	Feldman (1–0)	**Snell** (0–1)	—	26,846	2–5	
8	April 12	Athletics	0–4	Duchscherer (1–0)	**Rowland-Smith** (0–1)	—	45,876	2–6	
9	April 13	Athletics	3–0	**Fister** (1–1)	Ziegler (0–2)	**Aardsma** (3)	18,043	3–6	
10	April 14	Athletics	4–2	**Vargas** (1–1)	Gaudin (0–1)	**Aardsma** (4)	15,978	4–6	
11	April 16	Tigers	11–3	**Hernández** (1–0)	Bonderman (1–1)	—	39,999	5–6	
12	April 17	Tigers	4–2	**League** (2–0)	Verlander (0–1)	**Aardsma** (5)	31,647	6–6	
13	April 18	Tigers	2–4	Scherzer (1–1)	**Snell** (0–2)	Valverde (3)	30,419	6–7	
14	April 19	Orioles	8–2	**Fister** (2–1)	Bergesen (0–2)	—	14,528	7–7	
15	April 20	Orioles	3–1	**Vargas** (2–1)	Hernandez (0–3)	**Aardsma** (6)	15,931	8–7	
16	April 21	Orioles	4–1	**Hernández** (2–0)	Millwood (0–3)	—	18,401	9–7	
17	April 23	@ White Sox	6–7	Thornton (2–1)	**Lowe** (1–2)	—	24,653	9–8	
18	April 24	@ White Sox	4–5	Jenks (1–0)	**Aardsma** (0–1)	—	25,253	9–9	
19	April 25	@ White Sox	2–3	Danks (3–0)	**League** (2–1)	Jenks (4)	28,274	9–10	
20	April 26	@ Royals	1–3	Davies (2–1)	**Hernández** (2–1)	Chen (1)	11,391	9–11	
21	April 27	@ Royals	3–2	**Kelley** (1–0)	Rupe (0–1)	**Aardsma** (7)	14,969	10–11	
22	April 28	@ Royals	6–5	**League** (3–1)	Thompson (0–1)	**Aardsma** (8)	13,206	11–11	
23	April 30	Rangers	0–2 (12)	Francisco (3–3)	**League** (3–2)	Feliz (4)	34,055	11–12	

May: 8–19 (home: 5–11; road: 3–8)

#	Date	Opponent	Score	Win	Loss	Save	Attendance	Record	Boxscore
24	May 1	Rangers	3–6	Harrison (1–1)	**Hernández** (2–2)	Francisco (2)	30,225	11–13	
25	May 2	Rangers	1–3 (11)	Nippert (1–2)	**Lowe** (1–3)	Feliz (5)	27,185	11–14	
26	May 4	Rays	2–5	Shields (4–0)	**Vargas** (2–2)	Soriano (7)	15,589	11–15	
27	May 5	Rays	3–8	Garza (5–1)	**Lee** (0–1)		14,627	11–16	
28	May 6	Rays	0–8	Niemann (2–0)	**Rowland-Smith** (0–2)		17,617	11–17	
29	May 7	Angels	0–8	Weaver (4–1)	**Hernández** (2–3)		37,602	11–18	
30	May 8	Angels	3–4 (10)	Rodney (3–0)	**Aardsma** (0–2)	Fuentes (4)	30,446	11–19	
31	May 9	Angels	8–1	**Vargas** (3–2)	Santana (1–3)		28,668	12–19	
32	May 11	@ Orioles	5–1	**Lee** (1–1)	Hernandez (0–5)	League (1)	12,614	13–19	
33	May 12	@ Orioles	2–5	Bergesen (3–2)	**Rowland-Smith** (0–3)	Simón (4)	11,448	13–20	
34	May 13	@ Orioles	5–6	Hendrickson (1–0)	**League** (3–3)	Simón (5)	20,938	13–21	
35	May 14	@ Rays	4–3	**Fister** (3–1)	Davis (3–3)	**Aardsma** (9)	27,856	14–21	
36	May 15	@ Rays	2–3	Soriano (2–0)	**Colomé** (0–1)		23,627	14–22	
37	May 16	@ Rays	1–2	Wheeler (2–0)	**Lee** (1–2)	Soriano (10)	23,005	14–23	
38	May 17	@ Athletics	4–8	Gonzalez (4–3)	**Rowland-Smith** (0–4)		10,051	14–24	
39	May 18	@ Athletics	5–6 (10)	Breslow (1–1)	**League** (3–4)		10,512	14–25	
40	May 19	Blue Jays	2–3	Cecil (3–2)	**Fister** (3–2)	Gregg (12)	19,208	14–26	
41	May 20	Blue Jays	4–3	**Kelley** (2–0)	Gregg (0–1)		20,452	15–26	
42	May 21	Padres	15–8	**Lee** (2–2)	Leblanc (2–2)		24,139	16–26	
43	May 22	Padres	1–2	Richard (4–2)	**Snell** (0–3)	Bell (12)	28,670	16–27	
44	May 23	Padres	1–8	Latos (4–3)	**Hernández** (2–4)		33,315	16–28	
45	May 25	Tigers	5–3	**Kelley** (3–0)	Verlander (5–3)	Aardsma (10)	20,920	17–28	
46	May 26	Tigers	5–4	**League** (4–4)	Perry (1–3)	Aardsma (11)	22,422	18–28	
47	May 28	@ Angels	8–3	**Lee** (3–2)	Kazmir		41,770	19–28	
48	May 29	@ Angels	5–1 (10)	Fuentes (3–1)	**League** (4–5)		39,382	19–29	
49	May 30	@ Angels	9–7	Rodney (0–3)	**Aardsma** (4–0)		40,017	19–30	
50	May 31	Twins	5–4	Liriano (5–3)	**Fister** (3–3)	Rauch (13)	19,795	19–31	

June: 14–13 (home: 8–4; road: 5–9)

#	Date	Opponent	Score	Win	Loss	Save	Attendance	Record	Boxscore
51	June 1	Twins	7–1	**Vargas** (4–2)	Blackburn (6–2)		18,740	20–31	
52	June 2	Twins	2–1 (10)	**League** (5–5)	Guerrier (0–1)		20,414	21–31	
53	June 3	Twins	4–1	**Hernández** (3–4)	Pavano (5–6)	**Aardsma** (12)	21,291	22–31	
54	June 4	Angels	7–1	Saunders (4–6)	**Snell** (0–4)		29,230	22–32	
55	June 5	Angels	11–2	Santana (6–3)	**Olson** (0–1)		31,548	22–33	
56	June 6	Angels	9–4	Piñeiro (4–6)	**Kelley** (3–1)		33,076	22–34	
57	June 7	@ Rangers	4–2	**Lee** (4–2)	Feldman (3–6)		20,152	23–34	
58	June 8	@ Rangers	7–1	Lewis (5–4)	**Hernández** (3–5)		18,774	23–35	
59	June 9	@ Rangers	12–2	Wilson (5–3)	**Snell** (0–5)		26,432	23–36	
60	June 10	@ Rangers	12–3	Hunter (2–0)	**Rowland-Smith** (0–5)		19,674	23–37	
61	June 11	@ Padres	4–3	Thatcher (1–0)	**Aardsma** (0–4)		20,049	23–38	
62	June 12	@ Padres	7–1	LeBlanc (4–4)	**Lee** (4–3)		30,019	23–39	
63	June 13	@ Padres	4–2	**Hernández** (4–5)	Gregerson (1–2)	**Aardsma** (13)	23,429	24–39	
64	June 14	@ Cardinals	9–3	Wainwright (9–4)	**French** (0–1)		36,113	24–40	
65	June 15	@ Cardinals	4–2	Hawksworth (1–3)	**Rowland-Smith** (0–6)	Franklin (12)	40,269	24–41	
66	June 16	@ Cardinals	2–1	**Vargas** (5–2)	García (6–3)	**Aardsma** (14)	40,020	25–41	
67	June 18	Reds	1–0	**Lee** (5–3)	Cueto (6–2)		43,362	26–41	
68	June 19	Reds	5–1	**Hernández** (5–5)	LeCure (1–4)		26,468	27–41	
69	June 20	Reds	1–0	**Rowland-Smith** (1–6)	Harang (5–7)	**Aardsma** (15)	32,712	28–41	
70	June 22	Cubs	2–0	**Vargas** (6–2)	Dempster (5–6)	**Aardsma** (16)	27,975	29–41	
71	June 23	Cubs	8–1	**Lee (6–3)**	Wells (3–6)		31,394	30–41	
72	June 24	Cubs	3–2 (13)	Grabow (1–3)	**Olsen** (0–2)	Gorzelanny (1)	41,329	30–42	
73	June 25	@ Brewers	8–3	Bush (3–5)	**Rowland-Smith** (1–7)		30,087	30–43	
74	June 26	@ Brewers	5–4	**Sweeney** (1–0)	Wolf (5–7)	**League** (2)	41,655	31–43	
75	June 27	@ Brewers	3–0	Narveson (7–4)	**Vargas** (6–3)	Axford (7)	41,995	31–44	
76	June 29	@ Yankees	7–4	**Lee** (7–3)	Hughes (10–2)		45,780	32–44	
77	June 30	@ Yankees	7–0	**Hernández** (6–5)	Vázquez (6–7)		46,309	33–44	

July: 6–22 (home: 4–10; road: 2–12)

#	Date	Opponent	Score	Win	Loss	Save	Attendance	Record	Boxscore
78	July 1	@ Yankees	4–2	Sabathia (10–3)	**Aardsma** (0–5)	Rivera (18)	45,591	33–45	
79	July 2	@ Tigers	7–1	Scherzer (5–6)	**Fister** (3–4)		32,512	33–46	
80	July 3	@ Tigers	6–1	Verlander (10–5)	**Vargas** (6–4)		32,430	33–47	
81	July 4	@ Tigers	8–1	**Lee** (8–3)	Bonderman (4–6)		24,899	34–47	
82	July 5	Royals	6–4 (10)	Farnsworth (2–0)	**Cordero** (0–1)	Soria (23)	22,617	34–48	
83	July 6	Royals	3–2	Greinke (5–8)	**Rowland-Smith** (1–8)	Soria (24)	17,555	34–49	
84	July 7	Royals	7–3	Marte (3–0)	**League** (5–6)	Soria (25)	16,954	34–50	
85	July 8	Yankees	3–1	Pettitte (11–2)	**Aardsma** (0–6)	Rivera (20)	37,432	34–51	
86	July 9	Yankees	6–1	Hughes (11–2)	**Pauley** (0–1)		39,645	34–52	
87	July 10	Yankees	4–1	**Hernández** (7–5)	Chamberlain (1–4)		42,558	35–52	
88	July 11	Yankees	8–2	Sabathia (12–3)	**Rowland-Smith** (1–9)		42,069	35–53	
89	July 15	@ Angels	8–3	Piñeiro (10–6)	**Fister** (3–5)		41,959	35–54	
90	July 16	@ Angels	3–2	Weaver (9–5)	**Hernández** (7–6)	Fuentes (17)	41,449	35–55	
91	July 17	@ Angels	7–6	Jepsen (2–1)	**Sweeney** (1–1)	Fuentes (18)	42,977	35–56	
92	July 18	@ Angels	2–1 (10)	**League** (6–6)	Jepsen (2–2)	**Aardsma** (17)	38,883	36–56	
93	July 19	White Sox	6–1	Hudson (1–0)	**Pauley** (0–2)		21,749	36–57	
94	July 20	White Sox	4–0	Danks (10–7)	**Fister** (3–6)		21,366	36–58	
95	July 21	White Sox	2–1 (11)	**League** (7–6)	Jenks (1–3)		21,529	37–58	
96	July 22	Red Sox	8–6 (13)	Okajima (3–2)	**Olson** (0–3)	R. Ramírez (2)	28,074	37–59	
97	July 23	Red Sox	2–1	Atchison (2–1)	**Vargas** (6–5)	Papelbon (22)	34,932	37–60	
98	July 24	Red Sox	5–1	**Seddon** (1–0)	Lester (11–5)		43,694	38–60	
99	July 25	Red Sox	4–2	**League** (8–6)	Okajima (3–3)	**Aardsma** (18)	40,001	39–60	
100	July 26	@ White Sox	6–1	Danks (11–7)	**Hernández** (7–7)		38,815	39–61	
101	July 27	@ White Sox	11–0	Floyd (6–8)	**Rowland-Smith** (1–10)		26,080	39–62	
102	July 28	@ White Sox	6–5	Thornton (3–3)	**Wright** (1–3)	Jenks (21)	25,126	39–63	
103	July 29	@ White Sox	9–5	García (10–4)	**Pauley** (0–3)		28,483	39–64	
104	July 30	@ Twins	5–3	Baker (9–9)	**Fister** (3–7)	Capps (27)	40,596	39–65	
105	July 31	@ Twins	4–0	Slowey (10–5)	**Hernández** (7–8)		40,799	39–66	

August: 13–14 (home: 7–7; road: 6–7)

#	Date	Opponent	Score	Win	Loss	Save	Attendance	Record	Boxscore
106	August 1	@ Twins	4–0	Liriano (10–7)	**French** (0–2)		40,374	39–67	
107	August 3	Rangers	3–2	**Vargas** (7–5)	Lewis (9–8)	**Aardsma** (19)	23,466	40–67	
108	August 4	Rangers	11–6	Feldman (6–9)	**Fister** (3–8)		20,174	40–68	
109	August 5	Rangers	6–0	Hunter (9–1)	**Hernández** (7–9)		22,624	40–69	
110	August 6	Royals	7–1	**French** (1–2)	Greinke (7–11)		20,411	41–69	
111	August 7	Royals	2–1	Chen (7–5)	**Pauley** (0–4)	Soria (31)	24,520	41–70	
112	August 8	Royals	3–2	**Vargas** (8–5)	Davies (5–7)	**Aardsma** (20)	24,078	42–70	
113	August 9	Athletics	3–1	**Fister** (4–8)	Mazzaro (6–4)	**Aardsma** (21)	19,943	43–70	
114	August 10	Athletics	2–0	**Hernández** (8–9)	Anderson (3–3)	**Aardsma** (22)	21,377	44–70	
115	August 11	Athletics	5–1	Braden (7–8)	**French** (1–3)		31,560	44–71	
116	August 13	@ Indians	3–2	**Pauley** (1–4)	Carmona (11–10)	**Aardsma** (23)	26,424	45–71	
117	August 14	@ Indians	9–3	**Vargas** (9–5)	Talbot (8–10)		25,980	46–71	
118	August 15	@ Indians	9–1	Sipp (2–2)	**Hernández** (8–10)		14,888	46–72	
119	August 16	@ Orioles	5–4	Albers (5–3)	**White** (0–1)		12,375	46–73	
120	August 17	@ Orioles	4–0	**French** (2–3)	Millwood (2–13)	**League** (3)	14,739	47–73	
121	August 18	@ Orioles	6–5	**Pauley** (2–4)	Guthrie (7–12)	**Aardsma** (24)	11,213	48–73	
122	August 20	@ Yankees	6–0	**Hernández** (9–10)	Burnett (9–11)		46,493	49–73	
123	August 21	@ Yankees	9–5	Logan (1–0)	**Vargas** (9–6)	Rivera (25)	48,158	49–74	
124	August 22	@ Yankees	10–0	Sabathia (17–5)	**French** (2–4)		46,778	49–75	
125	August 23	@ Red Sox	6–3	Lackey (12–7)	**Fister** (4–9)	Papelbon (31)	37,133	49–76	
–	August 24	@ Red Sox	Postponed (rain) Rescheduled for August 25						
126	August 25	@ Red Sox	5–3	Beckett (4–3)	**Pauley** (2–5)	Papelbon (32)	37,183	49–77	
127	August 25	@ Red Sox	4–2	**Hernández** (10–10)	Wakefield (3–10)	**League** (4)	37,451	50–77	
128	August 27	Twins	6–3	Baker (12–9)	**Vargas** (9–7)		37,798	50–78	
129	August 28	Twins	1–0	Blackburn (8–8)	**Fister** (4–10)	Fuentes (24)	29,892	50–79	
130	August 29	Twins	2–1	**French** (3–4)	Pavano (15–10)	**Aardsma** (25)	28,923	51–79	
131	August 30	Angels	5–3	Santana (14–9)	**Pauley** (2–6)	Rodney (7)	20,545	51–80	
132	August 31	Angels	3–1	**League** (9–6)	Jepsen (2–4)	**Aardsma** (26)	18,737	52–80	

September: 9–18 (home: 4–8; road: 5–10)

#	Date	Opponent	Score	Win	Loss	Save	Attendance	Record	Boxscore
133	September 1	Angels	4–2	Bell (2–4)	**Vargas** (9–8)	Rodney (8)	17,515	52–81	
134	September 2	Indians	6–3	Tomlin (3–3)	**Fister** (4–11)	Perez (17)	17,269	52–82	
135	September 3	Indians	1–0	**French** (4–4)	Carmona (11–14)	**Aardsma** (27)	17,271	53–82	
136	September 4	Indians	4–2	Talbot (9–11)	**Pauley** (2–7)	Perez (18)	25,108	53–83	
137	September 5	Indians	3–0	**Hernández** (11–10)	Gómez (3–3)	**Aardsma** (28)	22,621	54–83	
138	September 6	@ Athletics	6–2	Anderson (4–6)	**Vargas** (9–9)		11,581	54–84	
139	September 7	@ Athletics	7–5	**Fister** (5–11)	Braden (9–11)	**Aardsma** (29)	10,067	55–84	
140	September 8	@ Athletics	4–3	Gonzalez (14–8)	**French** (4–5)	Bailey (22)	15,180	55–85	
141	September 10	@ Angels	4–3 (14)	Thompson (1–0)	**Sweeney** (1–2)		42,203	55–86	
142	September 11	@ Angels	7–4	Santana (16–9)	**Hernández** (11–11)	Rodney (9)	39,123	55–87	
143	September 12	@ Angels	3–0	Haren (10–12)	**Vargas** (9–10)	Rodney (10)	42,357	55–88	
144	September 13	Red Sox	5–1	Lester (17–8)	**Fister** (5–12)		19,063	55–89	
145	September 14	Red Sox	9–6	Hill (1–0)	**League** (9–7)		18,381	55–90	
146	September 15	Red Sox	5–1	Buchholz (16–7)	**Pauley** (2–8)		21,936	55–91	
147	September 17	Rangers	2–1	**Hernández** (12–11)	Wilson (14–7)	**Aardsma** (30)	19,302	56–91	
148	September 18	Rangers	6–1	Lee (12–8)	**Vargas** (9–11)		20,843	56–92	
149	September 19	Rangers	2–1	**Fister** (6–12)	Hunter (12–4)	**Aardsma** (31)	20,764	57–92	
150	September 21	@ Blue Jays	5–3	Rzepczynski (2–4)	**French** (4–6)	Gregg (34)	12,158	57–93	
151	September 22	@ Blue Jays	6–3	**Pauley** (3–8)	Drabek (0–2)		12,302	58–93	
152	September 23	@ Blue Jays	1–0	Hill (1–2)	**Hernández** (12–12)	Gregg (35)	12,590	58–94	
153	September 24	@ Rays	5–3	Niemann (11–7)	**Vargas** (9–12)	Soriano (44)	17,840	58–95	
154	September 25	@ Rays	9–1	Garza (15–9)	**Fister** (6–13)		26,427	58–96	
155	September 26	@ Rays	6–2	**French** (5–6)	Shields (13–14)		22,301	59–96	
156	September 27	@ Rangers	7–5	**Pauley** (4–8)	Wilson (14–8)	**League** (5)	29,381	60–96	
157	September 28	@ Rangers	3–1	**Hernández** (13–12)	Feldman (7–11)	**League** (6)	26,043	61–96	
158	September 29	@ Rangers	6–5	Feliz (4–3)	**Cortes** (0–1)		23,052	61–97	
159	September 30	Athletics	8–1	Gonzalez (15–9)	**Fister** (6–14)		16,940	61–98	

October: 0–3 (home: 0–3)

#	Date	Opponent	Score	Win	Loss	Save	Attendance	Record	Boxscore
160	October 1	Athletics	9–0	Cahill (18–8)	**French** (5–7)		19,656	61–99	
161	October 2	Athletics	5–3	Anderson (7–6)	**Pauley** (4–9)	Breslow (4)	17,717	61–100	
162	October 3	Athletics	4–3	Braden (11–14)	**Varvaro** (0–1)	Breslow (5)	23,263	61–101	

=== Season standings ===
==== American League West ====
AL West
Team	W	L	Pct.	GB	Home	Road
Texas Rangers	90	72	.556	—	51‍–‍30	39‍–‍42
Oakland Athletics	81	81	.500	9	47‍–‍34	34‍–‍47
Los Angeles Angels	80	82	.494	10	43‍–‍38	37‍–‍44
Seattle Mariners	61	101	.377	29	35‍–‍46	26‍–‍55

==== American League Wild Card ====
Division winners
Team	W	L	Pct.
Tampa Bay Rays	96	66	.593
Minnesota Twins	94	68	.580
Texas Rangers	90	72	.556

Wild Card team (Top team qualifies for postseason)
Team	W	L	Pct.	GB
New York Yankees	95	67	.586	—
Boston Red Sox	89	73	.549	6
Chicago White Sox	88	74	.543	7
Toronto Blue Jays	85	77	.525	10
Detroit Tigers	81	81	.500	14
Oakland Athletics	81	81	.500	14
Los Angeles Angels	80	82	.494	15
Cleveland Indians	69	93	.426	26
Kansas City Royals	67	95	.414	28
Baltimore Orioles	66	96	.407	29
Seattle Mariners	61	101	.377	34

==== Record vs. opponents ====
2010 American League record Source: MLB Standings Grid – 2010
Team	BAL	BOS	CWS	CLE	DET	KC	LAA	MIN	NYY	OAK	SEA	TB	TEX	TOR	NL
Baltimore	–	9–9	4–3	3–3	5–5	2–4	6–0	3–5	5–13	3–7	3–6	7–11	6–4	3–15	7–11
Boston	9–9	–	1–6	4–4	3–3	4–3	9–1	3–2	9–9	4–5	7–3	7–11	4–6	12–6	13–5
Chicago	3–4	6–1	–	9–9	8–10	10–8	7–2	5–13	2–4	4–5	9–1	3–4	4–5	3–5	15–3
Cleveland	3–3	4–4	9–9	–	9–9	10–8	5–4	6–12	2–6	3–6	3–4	2–7	2–4	6–4	5–13
Detroit	5–5	3–3	10–8	9–9	–	10–8	6–4	9–9	4–4	3–3	3–5	1–6	3–6	4–4	11–7
Kansas City	4–2	3-4	9–10	8–10	8–10	–	3-7	5–13	3–5	3–6	5–4	4–4	2–7	3–3	8–10
Los Angeles	0–6	1–9	2–7	4–5	4–6	7–3	–	2–5	4–4	11–8	15–4	4–5	9–10	6–3	11–7
Minnesota	5–3	2–3	13–5	12–6	9–9	13–5	5–2	–	2–4	6–3	6-4	3–5	7–3	3–6	8–10
New York	13–5	9–9	4–2	6-2	4–4	5–3	4–4	4–2	–	9–1	6–4	8–10	4–4	8–10	11–7
Oakland	7–3	5–4	5–4	6–3	3–3	6–3	8–11	3–6	1–9	–	13–6	4–5	9–10	3–4	8–10
Seattle	6–3	3–7	1–9	4–3	5–3	4–5	4–15	4–6	4–6	6–13	–	2–7	7–12	2–3	9–9
Tampa Bay	11–7	11–7	4–3	7–2	6–1	4–4	5–4	5–3	10–8	5–4	7–2	–	4–2	10–8	7–11
Texas	4–6	6–4	5–4	4–2	6–3	7–2	10-9	3-7	4-4	10-9	12–7	2–4	–	3–7	14–4
Toronto	15–3	6–12	5–3	4–6	4–4	3–3	3–6	6–3	10–8	4–3	3–2	8–10	7–3	–	7–11

- Source: MLB Standings Grid – 2010

=== Players stats ===
==== Batting ====
Note: G = Games played; AB = At bats; R = Runs scored; H = Hits; 2B = Doubles; 3B = Triples; HR = Home runs; RBI = Runs batted in; BB = Base on balls; SB = Stolen bases; AVG = Batting average

Player	G	AB	R	H	2B	3B	HR	RBI	BB	SB	AVG
Eliézer Alfonzo	13	41	4	9	1	0	1	4	0	0	.220
Josh Bard	39	112	9	24	7	0	3	10	10	0	.214
Milton Bradley	73	244	28	50	9	1	8	29	28	8	.205
Russell Branyan	57	205	23	44	10	0	15	33	30	1	.215
Eric Byrnes	15	32	1	3	2	0	0	0	6	1	.094
Mike Carp	14	37	1	7	2	0	0	0	4	0	.189
Chone Figgins	161	602	62	156	21	2	1	35	74	42	.259
Ken Griffey Jr.	33	98	6	18	2	0	0	7	9	0	.184
Franklin Gutiérrez	152	568	61	139	25	3	12	64	50	25	.245
Greg Halman	9	29	1	4	1	0	0	3	1	1	.138
Rob Johnson	61	178	24	34	10	0	2	13	25	1	.191
Casey Kotchman	125	414	37	90	20	1	9	51	35	0	.217
Ryan Langerhans	60	107	16	21	2	1	3	4	24	4	.196
José López	150	593	49	142	29	0	10	58	23	3	.239
Matt Mangini	11	38	2	8	0	0	0	1	2	0	.211
Adam Moore	60	205	12	40	6	0	4	15	8	0	.195
Guillermo Quiróz	2	7	1	2	1	0	0	0	0	0	.286
Michael Saunders	100	289	29	61	11	2	10	33	35	6	.211
Justin Smoak	30	113	11	27	4	0	5	14	8	0	.239
Ichiro Suzuki	162	680	74	214	30	3	6	43	45	42	.315
Mike Sweeney	30	99	11	26	3	0	6	18	9	2	.263
Matt Tuiasosopo	50	127	12	22	5	0	4	11	9	0	.173
Jack Wilson	61	193	17	48	11	1	0	14	7	1	.249
Josh Wilson	108	361	22	82	14	2	2	25	14	5	.227
Chris Woodward	8	19	0	3	1	0	0	0	0	0	.158
Pitcher totals	162	18	0	0	0	0	0	0	0	0	.000
**Team totals**	**162**	**5409**	**513**	**1274**	**227**	**16**	**101**	**485**	**459**	**142**	**.236**

Source: ESPN.com

==== Pitching ====
Note: W = Wins; L = Losses; ERA = Earned run average; G = Games pitched; GS = Games started; SV=Saves; IP = Innings pitched; H =Hits; ER = Earned runs allowed; HR= Home Run allowed; BB = Walks allowed; SO = Strikeouts

Player	W	L	ERA	G	GS	SV	IP	H	ER	HR	BB	SO
David Aardsma	0	6	3.44	53	0	31	49.2	33	19	5	25	49
Jesús Colomé	0	1	5.29	12	0	0	17.0	15	10	1	11	16
Chad Cordero	0	1	6.52	9	0	0	9.2	10	7	1	5	6
Dan Cortes	0	1	3.38	4	0	0	5.1	3	2	0	3	6
Doug Fister	6	14	4.11	28	28	0	171.1	187	78	13	32	93
Luke French	5	7	4.83	16	13	0	87.2	88	47	13	29	37
Félix Hernández	13	12	2.27	34	34	0	249.2	194	63	17	70	232
Shawn Kelley	3	1	3.96	22	0	0	25.0	26	11	5	12	26
Brandon League	9	7	3.42	70	0	6	79.0	67	30	7	27	56
Cliff Lee	8	3	2.34	13	13	0	103.2	92	27	5	6	89
Mark Lowe	1	3	3.48	11	0	0	10.1	11	4	1	5	7
Garrett Olson	0	3	4.54	35	0	1	37.2	42	19	6	15	31
David Pauley	4	9	4.07	19	15	0	90.2	89	41	13	30	51
Chris Seddon	1	0	5.64	14	0	0	22.1	21	14	4	10	16
Ryan Rowland-Smith	1	10	6.75	27	20	0	109.1	141	82	25	44	49
Ian Snell	0	5	6.41	12	8	0	46.1	60	33	10	25	26
Brian Sweeney	1	2	3.16	24	0	0	37.0	33	13	5	6	14
Kanekoa Texeira	0	1	5.30	16	0	0	18.2	22	11	0	10	14
Jason Vargas	9	12	3.78	31	31	0	192.2	187	81	18	54	116
Anthony Varvaro	0	1	11.25	4	0	0	4.0	6	5	2	6	5
Sean White	0	1	5.24	38	0	0	34.1	45	20	4	11	15
Jamey Wright	0	1	3.41	28	0	0	37.0	30	14	2	16	19
**Team totals**	**61**	**101**	**3.93**	**162**	**162**	**38**	**1438.0**	**1402**	**628**	**157**	**452**	**973**

Source: ESPN.com

- Through October 3, 2010.

=== Roster ===
2010 Seattle Mariners
**Roster**
**Pitchers**: 53 David Aardsma; 37 Jesús Colomé; 33 Chad Cordero; 57 Dan Cortes; 58 Doug Fister; 25 Lucas French; 34 Félix Hernández; 23 Shawn Kelley; 43 Brandon League; 36 Cliff Lee; 57 Mark Lowe; 49 Garrett Olson; 39 David Pauley; 18 Ryan Rowland-Smith; 52 Chris Seddon; 35 Ian Snell; 37 Brian Sweeney; 54 Kanekoa Texeira; 38 Jason Vargas; 60 Anthony Varvaro; 46 Sean White; 50 Jamey Wright	**Catchers**: 41 Eliézer Alfonzo; 26 Josh Bard; 32 Rob Johnson; 10 Adam Moore; 40 Guillermo Quiróz; **Infielders**: 30 Russell Branyan; 20 Mike Carp; 9 Chone Figgins; 13 Casey Kotchman; 4 José López; 61 Matt Mangini; 17 Justin Smoak; 5 Mike Sweeney; 27 Matt Tuiasosopo; 2 Jack Wilson; 16 Josh Wilson; 6 Chris Woodward; **Outfielders**: 15 Milton Bradley; 1 Eric Byrnes; 24 Ken Griffey Jr.; 21 Franklin Gutiérrez; 56 Greg Halman; 12 Ryan Langerhans; 55 Michael Saunders; 51 Ichiro Suzuki	**Manager**: 22 Daren Brown; 22 Don Wakamatsu; **Coaches**: 40 Rick Adair (pitching); 17 Mike Brumley (third base) (first base); 47 Alan Cockrell (hitting); 54 Roger Hansen (bench); 17 Steve Hecht (performance coach); 30,47 Alonzo Powell (hitting); 8 Lee Tinsley (first base) (third base); 44 Ty Van Burkleo (bench); 28 John Wetteland (bullpen); 48 Carl Willis (pitching)

== Minor league affiliates ==
Level	Team (location)	Manager	League	Record
Triple-A	Tacoma Rainiers (Tacoma, Washington)	Daren Brown and José Castro	Pacific Coast League	76–67; LEAGUE CHAMPIONS
Double-A	West Tenn Diamond Jaxx (Jackson, Tennessee)	Tim Laker	Southern League	70–69
Class-A Advanced	High Desert Mavericks (Adelanto, California)	Darrin Garner and Jim Horner	California League	75–65
Class-A	Clinton LumberKings (Clinton, Iowa)	John Tamargo	Midwest League	79–60
Class-A Short-Season	Everett AquaSox (Everett, Washington)	José Moreno	Northwest League	44–32; LEAGUE CHAMPIONS
Rookie	Pulaski Mariners (Pulaski, Virginia)	Eddie Menchaca	Appalachian League	35–30
Rookie	Arizona League Mariners (Peoria, Arizona)	Andy Bottin	Arizona League	22–34
Rookie	Dominican Summer Mariners (Santo Domingo, Dominican Republic)	Francisco Gerez	Dominican Summer League	—
Rookie	Venezuelan Summer Mariners (Venezuela)	Russell Vasquez	Venezuelan Summer League	—
