= Luke French =

American baseball player (born 1985)

- Pitcher
- Born: September 13, 1985 (age 40); Salina, Kansas, U.S.
- Batted: Left Threw: Left

MLB debut
- May 15, 2009, for the Detroit Tigers

Last MLB appearance
- October 1, 2010, for the Seattle Mariners

MLB statistics
- Win–loss record: 9–12
- Earned run average: 4.99
- Strikeouts: 79
- Stats at Baseball Reference

Teams
- Detroit Tigers (2009); Seattle Mariners (2009–2010)

Lucas Stephen French (born September 13, 1985) is an American former professional baseball pitcher. He was selected by the Detroit Tigers in the eighth round of the 2004 Major League Baseball draft. French debuted with the Tigers in 2009, then played with the Seattle Mariners in 2009 and 2010.

Born in Kansas, French attended Heritage High School in Littleton, Colorado, where he was a Louisville Slugger Preseason High School All-American in his senior year. Drafted by the Tigers, he spent the next several years in their minor league system before making his debut with the team in 2009. He won his first game in the major leagues on July 9, then was traded to the Mariners on July 31 as part of a deal that brought Jarrod Washburn to Detroit to help the Tigers try to win the American League Central Division.

With Seattle, French replaced Washburn in the starting rotation. He had more wins that year with them than he did in Detroit, but his earned run average (ERA) was higher. In 2010, he split the year between the Mariners and the Triple-A Tacoma Rainiers, though after Ryan Rowland-Smith was placed on the disabled list on July 28, he spent the rest of the year in the Mariners' starting rotation. Twice, he took a no-hitter through five innings. At Tacoma, he tied for fifth in the Pacific Coast League in wins despite only pitching half the season for them; in Seattle, he had a 5–7 record and a 4.83 ERA. French would never appear in a Major League Baseball game again after 2010. He spent all of 2011 with Tacoma, where his ERA was 6.27. Allowed to become a free agent after the season, he pitched one final season in the Minnesota Twins organization in 2012.

== Early life ==
Luke was born to Greg and Colleen French on September 13, 1985, in Salina, Kansas. He grew up rooting for the Seattle Mariners, listing Ken Griffey Jr., Randy Johnson, and Jay Buhner among his favorite players. At Heritage High School in Littleton, Colorado, he played football, basketball, and baseball. After his freshman year, he stopped playing football to focus more on baseball; then after his sophomore year, he quit basketball for the same reason. As a senior, he was a Louisville Slugger Preseason High School All-American selection.

French was selected to play in the inaugural Aflac All-America High School Baseball Classic on August 23, 2003, at Hammond Stadium in Ft. Myers, Florida. He said this about the experience:

The Aflac All American was very special to me. To be recognized as one of the top players in the country was a great honor. But not only that I got to see where I stood as a baseball player. Playing against the greatest players in the country at the highest level on national TV was a true test for me.

— Luke French, topprospectalert.com: 2007.

At the end of his senior year, French was drafted by the Detroit Tigers in the eighth round of the 2004 Major League Baseball (MLB) Draft.

== Professional career ==
=== Detroit Tigers ===
In 2004, French began his minor league career with the Rookie-level Gulf Coast League (GCL) Tigers. In 11 games (10 starts), he had a 1–3 record, a 2.74 earned run average (ERA), 49 strikeouts, and 19 walks in 49 1/3 innings pitched. French split the next season between the GCL Tigers, the Single-A West Michigan Whitecaps of the Midwest League, and the Single-A advanced Lakeland Tigers of the Florida State League (FSL). In 12 starts among all three, he had a 5–3 record, a 5.45 ERA, 50 strikeouts, and 87 hits allowed in 67 2/3 innings pitched.

French spent all of 2006 with West Michigan. Used exclusively as a starter in his 26 appearances, he had an 11–8 record, a 3.72 ERA, 94 strikeouts, and 156 hits allowed in 157 1/3 innings pitched. His 11 wins tied with three other starters for seventh in the Midwest League, and his 157 1/3 innings pitched ranked sixth.

For the 2007 season, French spent the whole year with Lakeland. He finished second in the FSL with 14 losses (behind Zach Ward with 17), tied for second with 27 starts (tied with three others behind Tyler Norrick's 28), and finished fourth with 149 innings pitched (behind Norrick's 165 1/3, Drew Carpenter's 163, and Brandon Magee's 156 2/3) in 2007.

French earned a promotion to the Double-A Erie SeaWolves in 2008. He went 9–11 with a 4.02 ERA in 27 games (26 starts). French led the Eastern League with 170 innings pitched and 195 hits allowed, while he tied Brad Bergesen and Magee for the lead with three complete games, finished second with the same amount of losses as four other starters (11, behind Magee's 13), and gave up the fifth-most walks in the league (60, tied for fifth with Kyle Aselton).

In 2009, French began the year with the Triple-A Toledo Mud Hens of the International League. He was called up to the Tigers on May 14, 2009, when Nate Robertson was placed on the disabled list retroactive to May 6. He said he was very excited about the chance to pitch in the major leagues:

I'm getting an opportunity to live out the dream, and it's surreal. You get to be on a card. And my friend who is really into fantasy baseball said, 'I'm picking you up in my league.' That's cool.

— Luke French, mlive.com, May 16, 2009

He made his major league debut on May 15 in the 9th inning of a 14–1 victory over the Oakland Athletics. French appeared in one more game before being optioned back to Toledo on May 21 after Robertson returned from the disabled list.

At Toledo, French went 4–4 with a 2.98 ERA in 13 games (all starts). He was called up at the end of June, this time to serve as a starter, replacing Alfredo Figaro on the Tigers' roster. On July 3, he made his first major league start, holding the Minnesota Twins to two runs over 4 2/3 innings. He got a no-decision, but the Tigers won 11–9. Six days later, he logged his first major league win, holding the Kansas City Royals to one run over 6 1/3 innings in a 3–1 triumph, defeating Zack Greinke, who would go on to win the American League (AL) Cy Young Award in 2009. It was his only win in seven games (five starts) for the Tigers through the end of July, but French posted a 3.38 ERA in that span.

=== Seattle Mariners ===
Though they led the AL Central through the 2009 season's first four months, the Tigers wanted some help for their rotation as they sought to make the playoffs. On July 31, 2009, French and prospect Mauricio Robles were traded to the Seattle Mariners for Jarrod Washburn. The trade brought French to the team he rooted for as a kid:

When I was in the fifth grade, I made a time line about where you want to be in the future and it was on my time line that I wanted to play for the Mariners. So this is pretty cool. The Mariners were my favorite team...I was a big fan of theirs.

— Luke French, MLB.com: August 2, 2009.

French replaced Washburn in Seattle's rotation and won his first start for the Mariners. In his August 5 debut, he gave up four runs over five innings but again defeated the Royals in an 11–6 victory. On August 15, he was the losing pitcher in a 5–2 defeat by the New York Yankees, but all four runs French allowed were unearned, the result of a Franklin Gutiérrez error in the second inning. After he started for the Mariners on September 5, manager Don Wakamatsu moved him to the bullpen so the team could use Brandon Morrow in the starting rotation. French was only used once the rest of the year, on September 19. In eight games (seven starts) for Seattle, he had a 3–3 record, a 6.63 ERA, 23 strikeouts, and 54 hits allowed in 38 innings. His combined totals between Seattle and Detroit were a 4–5 record, a 5.21 ERA, 42 strikeouts, and 87 hits allowed in 67 1/3 innings.

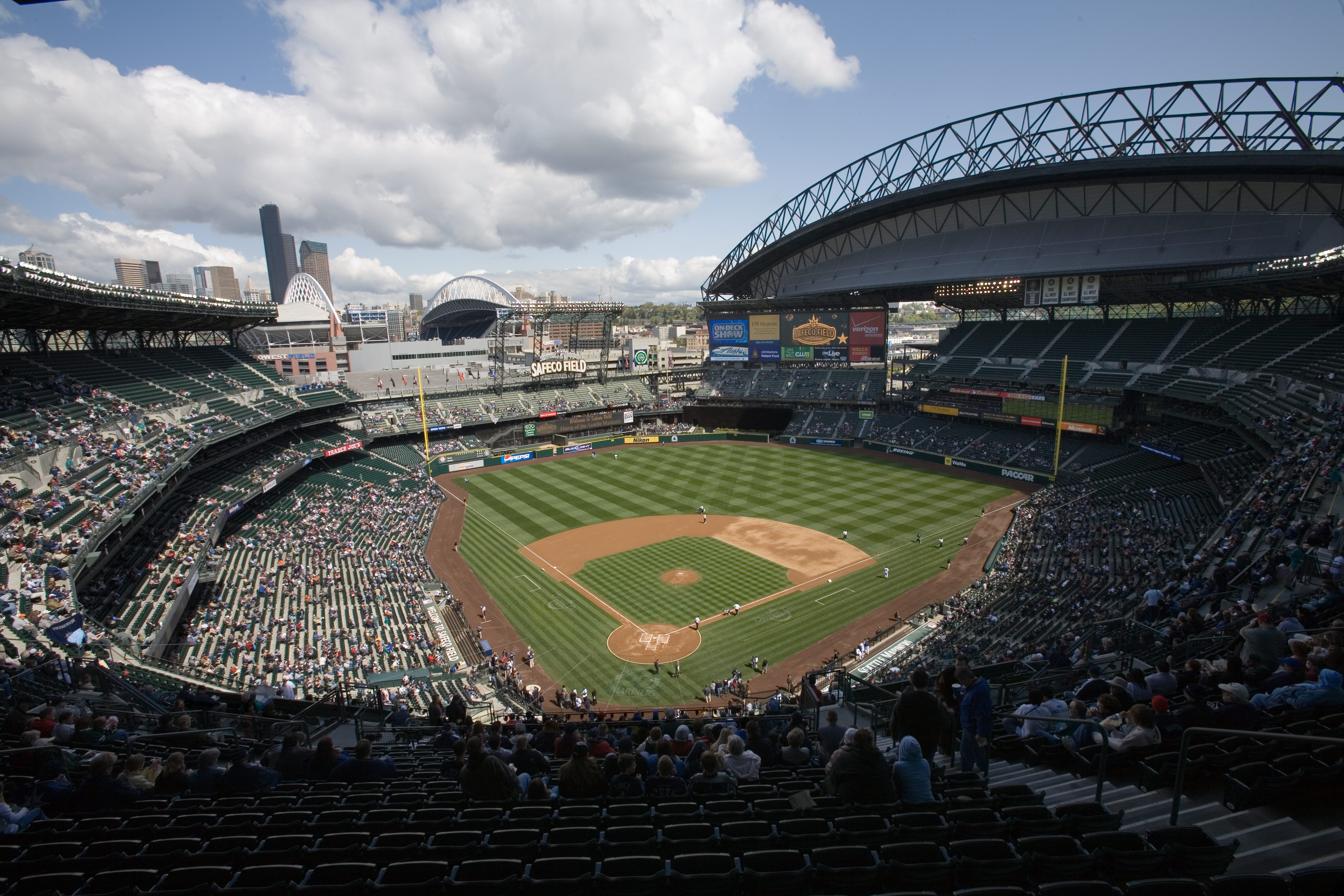
Safeco Field was French's home ballpark during his time with the Mariners.

In 2010, French started the season with Tacoma, where he had a 6–2 record and a 1.93 ERA (second in the league) through June 6. On that day, he was recalled by the Mariners to work out of the bullpen when Doug Fister went on the disabled list. He made two relief appearances and started a game on June 14 in place of Ian Snell, who had not been pitching well. French allowed four runs in four innings in a 9–3 loss to the St. Louis Cardinals. Four days later, French was optioned back to Tacoma. He was briefly recalled on July 9, making a relief appearance against the Yankees before being sent back to Tacoma the next day.

After Ryan Rowland-Smith was placed on the disabled list, French was called up on July 28 to take his spot in the Mariners' rotation. He remained in the rotation the rest of the year. On August 6, he again beat Greinke and the Royals, limiting Kansas City to one run over eight innings in a 7–1 victory. Eleven days later against the Baltimore Orioles, he had a no-hitter going until Josh Bell had a single with one out in the sixth inning, but he allowed no runs in 7 2/3 innings as the Mariners won 4–0. On August 29, he held the Twins to three hits in seven innings. One of the hits was a home run by Michael Cuddyer, but Seattle scored two runs to defeat Minnesota 2–1. Five days later, French carried a no-hitter through six innings before Shelley Duncan singled with one out in the seventh. He finished the game with seven scoreless innings and got the win as Seattle beat the Cleveland Indians 1–0.

I'm aware of the game but I'm not trying to get a no-hitter by any means...No-hit stuff was not really what I'm going for. I'm going for keeping the team in the game, make my pitches and get better every time out there.

— Luke French, ESPN, September 4, 2010.

His season ended poorly, as he gave up eight runs in four innings on October 1 against the Oakland Athletics in what ESPN called "the worst of his 13 [2010] starts for the Mariners." French glumly reviewed his performance, saying, "All I can say is it wasn't my night. It's going to happen. It's not very fun, not the way you want to end the season."

In 17 starts for Tacoma in 2010, French had an 11–3 record, a 2.94 ERA, 63 strikeouts, and 109 hits allowed in 113 1/3 innings pitched. Though he only made 17 starts for Tacoma, his 11 wins tied with six others for fifth in the league. Additionally, his .786 winning percentage was the third-highest among starters with at least 100 innings pitched in the PCL. In 16 games (13 starts) with Seattle, he had a 5–7 record, a 4.83 ERA, 37 strikeouts, and 88 hits allowed in 87 2/3 innings.

French participated in spring training in 2011 for the Mariners, competing for a long relief spot in the bullpen. He was sent to Tacoma at the end of spring training. On August 13, 2011, French was designated for assignment by the Mariners to allow Wily Mo Peña onto the team's 40-man roster. In 26 starts for Tacoma, he had a 9–9 record, a 6.27 ERA, and 81 strikeouts in 146 1/3 innings. He ranked among PCL leaders in runs allowed (115, second to Alan Johnson's 118), earned runs allowed (102, second to Johnson's 109 and Chris Seddon's 104), and hits allowed (196, fifth in the PCL). The Mariners allowed him to become a free agent after the season.

=== Minnesota Twins ===
On January 18, 2012, French signed a minor league contract with the Minnesota Twins. He split the season between the Eastern League's New Britain Rock Cats and the International League's Rochester Red Wings. In nine starts for New Britain, he had a 4–1 record, a 2.10 ERA, 27 strikeouts, and 35 hits allowed in 55 2/3 innings. With Rochester, he appeared in 19 games, 14 of which were starts. He had a 1–5 record, a 6.42 ERA, 49 strikeouts, and 90 hits allowed in 74 1/3 innings. On November 2, he became a free agent.

== Further biography ==
Before he reached the major leagues in 2009, French married his wife, Blythe. He threw a fastball, slider, and changeup during his baseball career. When the Tigers played the Mariners in 2009, Griffey (back with the Mariners for his final season) gave French, who was a fan of his growing up, an autographed jersey. Griffey later became his teammate on the Mariners. "Mike Sweeney and I were talking when he walked up and stood there near us," Griffey recalled French's first day with the team. "We knew he wanted to introduce himself, so when we were done talking, both of us turned and started to walk away. Luke had his hand out and he just stared. Then I turned around and said, 'I'm just messin' with you.'"
