= Death to Flying Things =

Death to Flying Things is the nickname of three major league baseball players

- Jack Chapman (baseball), a player from 1874–1875.
- Bob Ferguson, a player in the 1860s and 1870s.
- Franklin Gutiérrez, a player from 2005 to 2017.
