= Dan Hudson =

Canadian artist (born 1959)

- Born: Daniel Hudson; April 2, 1959 (age 67); Oshawa, Ontario
- Occupations: Artist, photojournalist
- Website: http://www.danhudson.ca

Dan Hudson (born April 2, 1959) is a Canadian artist and photojournalist.

== Biography ==
Hudson received his Bachelor of Fine Arts at York University (Toronto) and did a studio residency at the Banff Centre. He lived in Toronto between 1979 and 1990 and since then has been based in the Bow Valley in the Canadian Rocky Mountains. Hudson's art and photography are informed by his enthusiasm for outdoor pursuits such as surfing, snowboarding, white water kayaking, mountain biking and wilderness adventure.

== Photography ==
Hudson is an outdoor adventure photographer specializing in backcountry skiing and snowboarding. His photographs have been published in books, magazines, newspapers and websites around the world, including more than 50 international cover shots and have also been exhibited in museums and art galleries across Canada. Hudson's photographs are notable for their "extreme" action within magnificent mountain settings.

== Art ==
Hudson's paintings and multimedia art works have been exhibited internationally and are represented in public and private collections throughout Canada, such as the Robert McLaughlin Gallery in Oshawa. He has won several awards for his art practice, and his work has a "cultural properties" designation by the Canadian Government. Distinguishing characteristics of Hudson's art works are environmental themes and layers of imagery. In both life and art, Hudson is in a constant state of reinventing himself.

== Sources ==
- Paula Gustafson (March 17, 1994). "DAN HUDSON: STILL LIFES". The Georgia Straight. Vancouver.
- Jeremy Perkins (Spring–Summer 1992). "DAN HUDSON: TEN YEARS OF INVESTIGATION". Artichoke: 16–20.
- Pierre Karch (Winter 1991–1992). "DAN HUDSON: NATURE ET NATUREL". Vie des Arts (in French): 71–72.
- Joan Murray (Summer 1991). "DAN HUDSON". Art Post: 14–16.
