= Matt Mangini =

American baseball player (born 1985)

- Third baseman
- Born: December 21, 1985 (age 40); Springfield, Massachusetts, U.S.
- Batted: Left Threw: Right

MLB debut
- September 23, 2010, for the Seattle Mariners

Last MLB appearance
- October 3, 2010, for the Seattle Mariners

MLB statistics
- Batting average: .211
- Home runs: 0
- Runs batted in: 1
- Stats at Baseball Reference

Teams
- Seattle Mariners (2010)

Matthew Steven Mangini (born December 21, 1985) is an American former Major League Baseball infielder who played for the Seattle Mariners in 2010.

== College career ==
Mangini attended Apex High School in Apex, North Carolina. He played college baseball for both the NC State Wolfpack and Oklahoma State Cowboys. In 2005, he played collegiate summer baseball with the Thunder Bay Border Cats of the Northwoods League (and would become the first Border Cat alumnus to play in the majors), and in 2006 with the Hyannis Mets of the Cape Cod Baseball League, winning the league's Thurman Munson Award for highest batting average (.310), and being named starting third baseman at the league's all-star game.

== Professional career ==
Mangini was drafted in the supplemental 1st round of the 2007 Major League Baseball draft. On September 22, 2010, Mangini was added to the Seattle Mariners 40-man roster.

Mangini started the 2011 season on the disabled list and was activated on April 21, but was immediately optioned to Triple-A. He was released on August 23, after leaving Triple-A Tacoma for an undisclosed personal issue.

The Tampa Bay Rays signed Mangini to a minor league contract on December 6, 2011. He also received an invitation to spring training. The Arizona Diamondbacks signed Mangini to a minor league contract on August 14, 2012. He signed a minor league contract with the Cincinnati Reds on February 2, 2013. He was released on March 27.
