= Carlos Triunfel =

Dominican baseball player (born 1990)

- Shortstop
- Born: February 27, 1990 (age 36); Santiago, Dominican Republic
- Batted: Right Threw: Right

MLB debut
- September 7, 2012, for the Seattle Mariners

Last MLB appearance
- August 17, 2014, for the Los Angeles Dodgers

MLB statistics
- Batting average: .160
- Home runs: 1
- Runs batted in: 6
- Stats at Baseball Reference

Teams
- Seattle Mariners (2012–2013); Los Angeles Dodgers (2014)

Carlos Manuel Triunfel Marquez (born February 27, 1990) is a Dominican former professional baseball shortstop. He played in Major League Baseball (MLB) for the Seattle Mariners and Los Angeles Dodgers.

== Professional career ==
=== Seattle Mariners ===
Triunfel was signed as a non-drafted free agent on September 23, 2006, by the Seattle Mariners. He began the 2007 season with the Single–A Wisconsin Timber Rattlers. He had back-to-back three-hit, two-RBI games on May 11 and May 12. He recorded 14-multi-hit games, including five three-hit games. He was named to the Midwest League All-Star team, but did not play due to injury. He hit .303 during season-high seven-game hit streak from July 12 to 18 and recorded a career-high six hits, all singles on July 30 against the Inland Empire 66ers, becoming just the second Maverick in club history to post six hits in a 9-inning game since Mike Berry in 1996. He participated in the Arizona Fall League after the season.

In his second season in 2008, Triunfel spent the season with the High–A High Desert Mavericks. He led team with 30 stolen bases, ranking tied for third among all Mariners' minor leaguers. He recorded an 11-game hitting streak from April 28 to May 9. Triufel hit a grand slam home run, going three-for-five with two runs scored, a double, a home run and four RBI on July 21. He recorded five consecutive multi-hit games from July 19 to 23 and was named California League Player of the Week in mid-July. Triunfel recorded a season-high 13-game hitting streak, batting .382 with 20 runs scored, seven extra-base hits and 10 RBI from July 25 to August 8.

Triunfel was sidelined for most of the 2009 season with a broken tibia. In limited time he hit .238 in 11 games. In 2010 with the West Tenn Diamond Jaxx Triunfel hit .257 in 129 games. He began 2011 with the Double–A Jackson Generals and hit .281 in 105 games prompting a late season promotion to the Triple–A Tacoma Rainiers.

In 2012, with Tacoma, he hit .260 in 131 games. He was called up to the Mariners for the first time in September and made his Major League debut as a pinch hitter on September 7, 2012, against the Oakland Athletics and struck out against Sean Doolittle. His first hit was a double off of Aaron Loup of the Toronto Blue Jays on September 13 in Toronto. In 10 games he hit .227 with 5 hits in 22 at-bats.

In 2013, he spent most of his time with Tacoma again, hitting .282 in 100 games but also spent time with the Mariners and hit .136 in 17 games. At the end of spring training 2014, the Mariners placed Triunfel on outright waivers to remove him from the 40-man roster.

=== Los Angeles Dodgers ===
On April 2, 2014, Los Angeles Dodgers claimed Triunfel off waivers on and assigned him to the Triple-A Albuquerque Isotopes. He was called up to the Dodgers on April 27, but optioned back to the minors two days later without appearing in a game. He was recalled again on June 14 and made his Dodgers debut as a pinch runner on June 15. He hit his first major league home run on June 17 against the Colorado Rockies. In 12 games with the Dodgers he had two hits in 15 at-bats. He spent most of the season in Triple–A where he hit .223 in 89 games. Triunfel was designated for assignment by the Dodgers on September 1.

=== San Francisco Giants ===
On November 18, 2014, Triunfel signed a minor league contract with the San Francisco Giants.

=== Cincinnati Reds ===
On December 27, 2015, Triunfel signed a minor league contract with the Cincinnati Reds organization. He spent the 2016 season with the Triple–A Louisville Bats, playing in 105 games and hitting .278/.296/.392 with four home runs and 40 RBI. Triunfel elected free agency following the season on November 7, 2016.

=== Olmecas de Tabasco ===
On April 18, 2017, Triunfel signed with the Olmecas de Tabasco of the Mexican League. He was released on May 1.

=== York Revolution ===
On May 16, 2017, Triunfel signed with the York Revolution of the Atlantic League of Professional Baseball. He was released on September 12, 2017.

=== New Jersey Jackals ===
On February 1, 2018, Triunfel signed with the Fargo-Moorhead RedHawks of the American Association. On April 11, 2018, he was traded to the New Jersey Jackals of the Can-Am League. He re-signed with the Jackals for the 2019 season, but was released on July 22 without ever appearing in a game in 2019.

== MiLB awards and accolades ==
- Midwest League Mid-Season All-Star (2007)
- California League Player of the Week (July 21–27, 2008)
- Arizona Fall League Rising Stars (2008)
- Top 50 Prospects: Number 30 (2008)
