= Paula Gustafson =

Canadian artist and author (1941–2006)

Paula Gustafson (February 25, 1941 – July 11, 2006) was a Canadian artist, author, editor and advocate for craft and art in Canada.

== Biography ==
Gustafson was born in Abbotsford, British Columbia. She started as a potter in the 1960s with a successful pottery studio in Nassau, Bahamas. In the 1970s, she returned to Canada and opened a second pottery studio in Yarrow, British Columbia. During this time Gustafson also began exploring the world of textiles, making her own natural dyes for the hand-spun wool she made into woven tapestries and knitted garments. During the 1980s, she began watercolour painting and botanical drawing. Gustafson also explored bronze casting, glassblowing, crafting jewellery and handmade paper. She spent several summers taking part in courses at Series at Red Deer College.

Gusafson was President of the Alberta Crafts Council from 1983 to 1985. In 1985, she became Executive Assistant to the President and Board of Governors at the Alberta College of Art. In the 1990s, she served as Director of the Visual Arts Board for the City of Calgary. She continued working until just a week before her death from cancer in 2006.

== Publications ==
Described as an "award-winning magazine featured outstanding writing about Canadian visual art and artists", Artichoke Magazine: Writings about the Visual Arts was founded in the 1989 by Gustafson with Mary-Beth Laviolette and David Garneau. It was published quarterly until 2005.

From 1990–1992, Gustafson was a writer / contributing editor to a various publications, including Artichoke, Western Living, Visual Arts Newsletter, Chatelaine, Canadian Living, Canada Crafts, Ontario Craft, Ceramics Monthly, Craft International, Borealis, American Indian Art, Textile: Fibre Forum, Ceramics Art and Perception, The Vancouver Sun, Ceramic Review, The Craft Factor, Blackflash, Above and Beyond, BC Woman, Vancouver Step, Monday Magazine, ArtFocus, Notations and the Glass Gazette.

From 1993 to 1999, she served as Visual Arts Critic for The Georgia Straight (Vancouver), Xtra West (Vancouver) and The Calgary Straight. At this time Gustafson was also a writer / corresponding editor for worldwide publications including: Asian Art News (Hong Kong), World Sculpture News (Hong Kong), ART Asia Pacific (Sydney), Object (Sydney), The Asian Art Newspaper (London), and South China Morning Post newspaper (Hong Kong).

During the last few months of her life, Gustafson was the editor for Galleries West magazine. She continued working until just a week before her death from cancer in 2006.

== Books ==
- Salish Weaving. 1981.
- Alberta Needles II: Quilts for the 90’s. 1990.
- Craft: Perception and Practice, a Canadian Discourse, Vol.1. 2002.
- Craft: Perception and Practice, a Canadian Discourse, Vol.2. 2005.
- A Brush with Life, an autobiography of Vancouver artist John Koerner. (editor) 2005
- Craft: Perception and Practice, a Canadian Discourse, Vol.3. 2008 (with Nisse Gustafson and Amy Gogarty).

== Awards ==
- The first Jean A. Chalmers Fund for the Crafts Award for critical writing about contemporary Canadian crafts.
- 2003 – Board of Governor's Award of Excellence from the Alberta College of Art

== Curatorial ==
- Curator, Notations 1994–1998, Canadian Embassy Gallery, Tokyo

== Sources ==
- Laurence, Robin. "Visual-arts Scene Loses Avid Supporter." The Georgia Straight. Vancouver Free Press Publishing Corp., 27 July 2006. Web. 19 Apr. 2016. https://www.straight.com/article/visual-arts-scene-loses-avid-supporter-0
