= Mauricio Robles =

Venezuelan baseball player (born 1989)

- Pitcher
- Born: March 5, 1989 (age 37); Valencia, Venezuela
- Batted: Left Threw: Left

MLB debut
- September 3, 2013, for the Philadelphia Phillies

Last appearance
- September 26, 2013, for the Philadelphia Phillies

MLB statistics
- Win–loss record: 0–0
- Earned run average: 1.93
- Strikeouts: 6
- Stats at Baseball Reference

Teams
- Philadelphia Phillies (2013)

Mauricio Antonio Robles (born March 5, 1989), is a Venezuelan former professional baseball pitcher, who played in Major League Baseball (MLB) for the Philadelphia Phillies. He was signed as a non-drafted free agent by the Detroit Tigers on April 1, 2006. Robles pitched for Venezuela at the 2013 World Baseball Classic.

Robles had a basic fastball, curveball, changeup combination. He was described as having a good arm with a good fastball and developing secondary pitches. While Robles’ fastball was clocked as high as 97 mph, his changeup was perhaps his best pitch and was described as a plus offering by peers and coaches.

== Baseball career ==
Robles finished fourth among Rookie-level Venezuelan Summer League (VSL) relievers, with 11.25 strikeouts per nine innings pitched (K/9), in 2006.

Robles topped all starting pitchers, with 10.83 K/9, in 2007. He was second in the VSL, with six losses, finished third with 83 strikeouts, and tied for fifth with 14 games started.

=== Detroit Tigers ===
In 2008, Robles went 5-3, with a 2.66 earned run average (ERA), in 23 appearances, including 16 starts, for the Minor League Baseball (MiLB) Class A full-season West Michigan Whitecaps, of the Midwest League. For the month of July, he ranked ninth in the league, with a 1.55 ERA, in five starts.

=== Seattle Mariners ===
After beginning the season by playing at two levels of A Ball for the Tigers, Robles was traded on July 31, 2009, to the Seattle Mariners, along with fellow pitcher Luke French, for veteran pitcher Jarrod Washburn. For the remainder of that Summer, he pitched for the Class A+ High Desert Mavericks, of the California League.

=== Philadelphia Phillies ===
On December 14, 2012, the Philadelphia Phillies claimed Robles off waivers, from Seattle. After progressing quickly through the Phillies’ Double-A and Triple-A farm teams, they promoted him to the major leagues, on September 3, 2013. Robles was sent outright to the Triple-A International League (IL) Lehigh Valley IronPigs, on October 3, 2013; he then declared his free agency, on November 4, 2013.

=== Chicago White Sox ===
Robles signed a minor league deal with the Chicago White Sox on November 24, 2013, that included an invitation to spring training. He spent the 2014 season with the IL’s Triple-A Charlotte Knights. Robles again became a free agent, following the season.

=== Bridgeport Bluefish ===
On April 5, 2016, Robles signed with the Bridgeport Bluefish of the Atlantic League of Professional Baseball. He became a free agent after the 2016 season.

== See also ==
- List of Major League Baseball players from Venezuela
