= Dan Cortes =

American baseball player (born 1987)

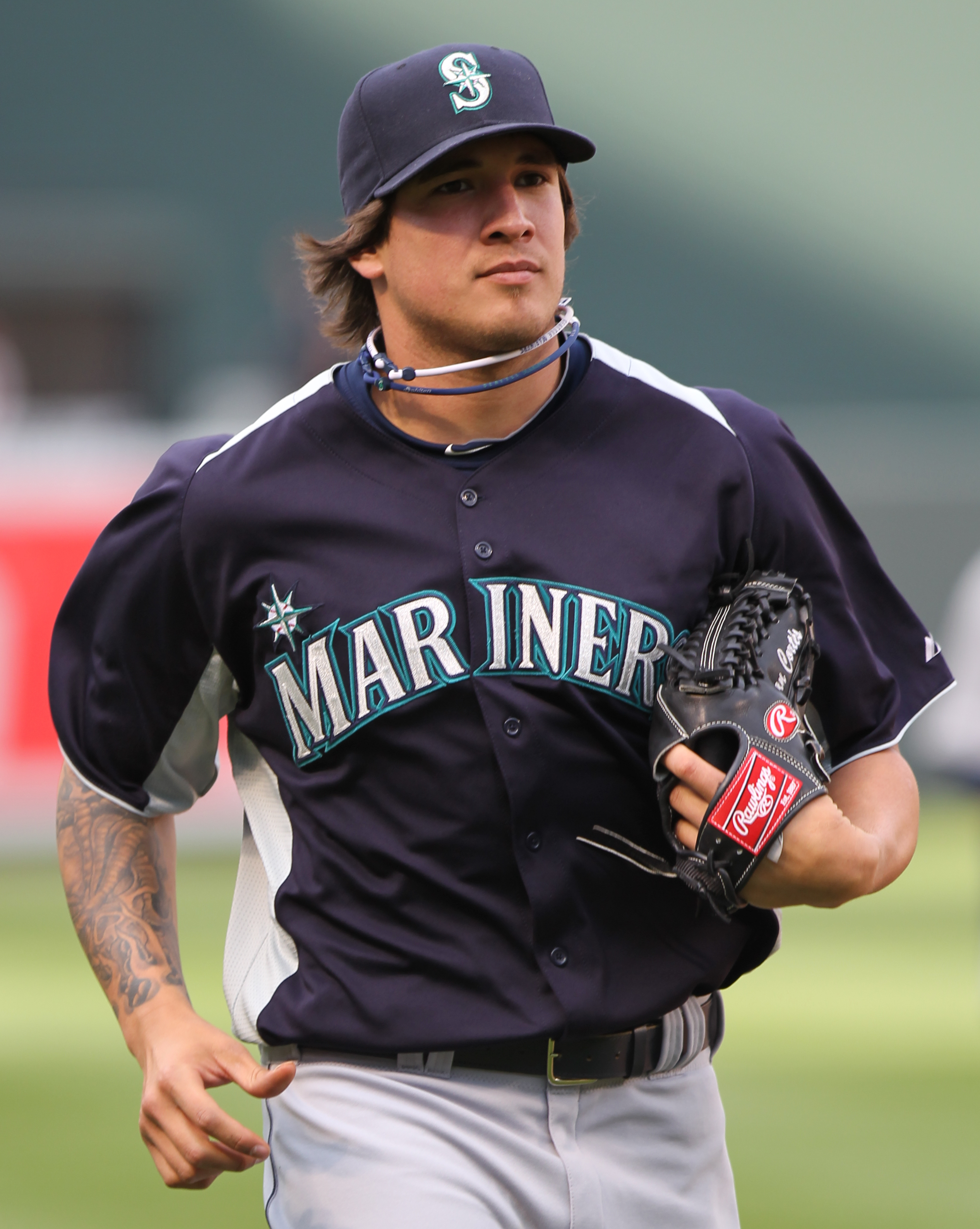
- Cortes with the Seattle Mariners
- Pitcher
- Born: March 4, 1987 (age 39); Pomona, California, U.S.
- Batted: Right Threw: Right

MLB debut
- September 24, 2010, for the Seattle Mariners

Last MLB appearance
- September 12, 2011, for the Seattle Mariners

MLB statistics
- Win–loss record: 0–3
- Earned run average: 5.06
- Strikeouts: 9
- Stats at Baseball Reference

Teams
- Seattle Mariners (2010–2011)

Daniel Adam Cortes (born March 4, 1987) is an American former professional baseball pitcher who played in 14 Major League Baseball (MLB) games with the Seattle Mariners from 2010 to 2011. He was drafted by the Chicago White Sox in the seventh round of the 2005 MLB draft. He played in several team's minor league organizations through 2013.

== Professional career ==
=== Chicago White Sox ===
Cortes began his professional career in 2005 with the Rookie-Level Bristol White Sox of the Appalachian League. While playing under manager Jerry Hairston, Cortes went 1–4 with a 5.17 ERA and 38 strikeouts in 15 games, even started. Baseball America ranked Cortes as the 22nd best prospect in the White Sox organization.

In 2006, Cortes began his season with the Class-A Kannapolis Intimidators of the South Atlantic League. He went 3–9 with a 4.01 ERA and 96 strikeouts in 20 games, 19 starts.

=== Kansas City Royals ===
On July 24, 2006, the White Sox traded Cortes to the Kansas City Royals along with pitcher Tyler Lumsden for relief pitcher Mike MacDougal. Cortes finished the 2006 season with the Class-A Burlington Bees of the Midwest League. He went 1–2 with a 6.69 ERA with 30 strikeouts in seven games, all starts.

In 2007 Cortes played for the Class-A Advanced Wilmington Blue Rocks of the Carolina League. He went 8–8 with a 3.07 ERA with 120 strikeouts in 23 games, all starts. He was named the Carolina League Pitcher of the Week for the week of August 20 to August 26. Cortes was again awarded Pitcher of the Week for the week of August 27 to September 2.

He played for the Double-A Northwest Arkansas Naturals of the Texas League in 2008. Cortes went 10–4 with a 3.78 ERA with 109 strikeouts in 23 games, all starts. Before the season he was ranked as the second best prospect in the Royals' organization by Baseball America. He was also named to the Texas League All-Star team. He did miss playing time while on the disabled list. The Royals recognized Cortes as the top pitcher for the Double-A Naturals and he was selected to play in the Arizona Fall League at the end of the '08 season.

In January 2009, Cortes received the "Paul Splittorff Pitcher of the Year Award" from the Royals. He attended spring training with the Royals in as a non-roster invitee. Cortes was named a "Player to Watch" by MLB.com before the season. He went 6–6 with a 3.92 ERA with 57 strikeouts in 16 games, 15 starts with the Double-A Northwest Arkansas Naturals.

=== Seattle Mariners ===
On July 10, 2009 Cortes was traded by the Royals with Derrick Saito to the Seattle Mariners for Yuniesky Betancourt. Cortes was assigned to the Double-A West Tenn Diamond Jaxx. he went 1–5 with a 4.94 ERA and 55 strikeouts in 10 games, all starts. He was added to the Mariners 40-man roster on November 20.

Cortes pitched in four major league games for the Mariners in 2010 and 10 games in 2011.

On December 12, 2011, the Mariners announced that Cortes had been non-tendered along with catcher Chris Gimenez.

=== Minor leagues ===
Cortes signed a minor league contract with the Washington Nationals on January 4, 2012. His contract was voided on February 29, after he failed his physical with the Nationals.

Cortes signed a minor league contract with the Arizona Diamondbacks on March 15, 2013. He was released on May 21. Four days later, he signed with the San Diego Padres. He elected free agency after the season.

== Personal life ==
After the 2005 season, Cortes went bowling with his co-workers from a sporting goods store. When he attempted to leave the bowling alley, he was stabbed after trying to break up a confrontation between a co-worker and the assailant. His co-worker died, and Cortes was hospitalized. He questioned if he would be able to pitch again since the injury was on his throwing arm, but he made a full recovery.

I told the guys I was going to leave and they said OK, they'd come too and we started to walk out...There were three gangsters outside and they picked a fight with one of my co-workers. I tried to mellow everyone out, but I got caught up in it and two guys tried to fight me. I started fighting and I got stabbed eight times.

— Dan Cortes, MLB.com: November 7, 2008.

On January 1, 2009, Cortes was arrested on charges of public intoxication and disorderly conduct in Fayetteville, Arkansas. According to police accounts, Cortes was arrested after he allegedly urinated on a fence outside Grub's Bar & Grille. After five hours in jail, Cortes was released when he posted a $655 bond.
