= Adam Moore =

American baseball player (born 1984)

- Catcher
- Born: May 8, 1984 (age 42); Longview, Texas, U.S.
- Batted: Right Threw: Right

MLB debut
- September 17, 2009, for the Seattle Mariners

Last MLB appearance
- September 30, 2018, for the Tampa Bay Rays

MLB statistics
- Batting average: .199
- Home runs: 7
- Runs batted in: 23
- Stats at Baseball Reference

Teams
- Seattle Mariners (2009–2011); Kansas City Royals (2012–2013); San Diego Padres (2014); Cleveland Indians (2015–2016); Tampa Bay Rays (2018)

Adam Ross Moore (born May 8, 1984) is an American former professional baseball catcher. He played in Major League Baseball (MLB) for the Seattle Mariners, Kansas City Royals, San Diego Padres, Cleveland Indians and Tampa Bay Rays.

== Amateur career ==
=== High school ===
Moore attended Mineola High School in Mineola, Texas, where he played both baseball and football. He batted .517 with a school-record 18 home runs, 63 RBI and 42 runs as a senior and was selected to the Texas High School Baseball Coaches Association 3A all-state team. Moore was also selected to the all-state team three times and named district Most Valuable Player as a junior and senior.

=== College ===
Moore played junior college baseball at Northeast Texas Community College, where he earned first team all-Texas Eastern Athletic Conference honors in two seasons and earned Collegiate Baseball magazine national player of the week honors. He redshirted at University of Nebraska in 2005 after suffering a knee injury. A year later, he attended University of Texas at Arlington, where he was named the 2006 Southland Conference Newcomer of the Year and first team all-conference selection. Moore hit .350 with 10 home runs, 50 RBI, 22 doubles, and 5 triples.

== Professional career ==
=== Seattle Mariners ===
The Seattle Mariners drafted Moore in the sixth round of the 2006 MLB draft. In Moore's first professional season in 2006, he combined to hit .281 with seven home runs and 33 RBIs in 228 at-bats in his split time between the Short-Season Everett Aqua Sox of the Northwest League and the Class A Wisconsin Timber Rattlers of the Midwest League.

Moore spent all of his time in 2007 with the Class A High Desert Mavericks. He finished third in the California League with 102 RBIs and a .543 slugging percentage. His 102 RBIs were second-most in the Mariners organization, while also finishing fifth with 22 home runs. Moore was named High Desert's Most Valuable Player by the Mariners. He was rated as the Mariners number 15 prospect after the season by Baseball America.

Moore spent the entire 2008 season with the Double-A West Tenn Diamond Jaxx. He batted .319 in 429 at-bats with 60 runs scored, 34 doubles, two triples, 14 home runs and 71 RBIs. Moore was named a Southern League All-Star. He was sixth in batting average and sixth in doubles. Moore hit only .091 in 11 at-bats in the playoffs, and in the last game of the Diamond Jaxx' playoff run, fractured his left thumb. He was selected as West Tenn's MVP by the Mariners Player Development staff and named the number 19 prospect in the Southern League by Baseball America also selected by the publication as the Mariners' number six prospect.

Moore started the season with West Tenn but was later promoted to the Tacoma Rainiers of the Pacific Coast League (PCL). Moore finished the 2009 season batting a combined .287 with 12 home runs, 56 RBIs, 24 doubles in 118 games.

On September 13, 2009 Moore was called up to the Seattle Mariners, along with Tacoma teammates Matt Tuiasosopo and Garrett Olson. Moore was the only one of the three players called up who traveled from Sacramento, where Tacoma was eliminated from the PCL playoffs against the Sacramento River Cats, to Arlington, Texas, where the Mariners were facing the Texas Rangers. Moore said this about the call-up:

This is so exciting, It's a dream come true...I got a little sleep on the flight, but I kept waking up with butterflies, knowing that I was coming back to Arlington, where I grew up watching games. Walking into this clubhouse, knowing that I am wearing a big league uniform now is really something....Oh yeah, I'm ready [to play], I'm ready for the opportunity to get out there, show them I believe in their stuff, get that good relationship with the pitching staff and just take them to victory.

— Adam Moore, mlb.com: September 13, 2009

Moore made his major league debut on September 17, 2009. He went 0-for-5 against the Chicago White Sox, a game that went 14 innings. He played all 14 innings in that game, catching 213 pitches from eight different Mariners pitchers.

Moore made the 25-man roster for the Mariners' 2010 season. He split time with Mariners catchers Rob Johnson, Josh Bard, and others.

On the April 7, 2011, Moore sustained a meniscus tear to his right knee and was out for two months.

On March 6, 2012, Moore broke the third metacarpal in his right wrist blocking a ball behind the plate. An examination the next day revealed the break. This cost Moore a chance to make the roster at the start of 2012. He was designated for assignment on July 1.

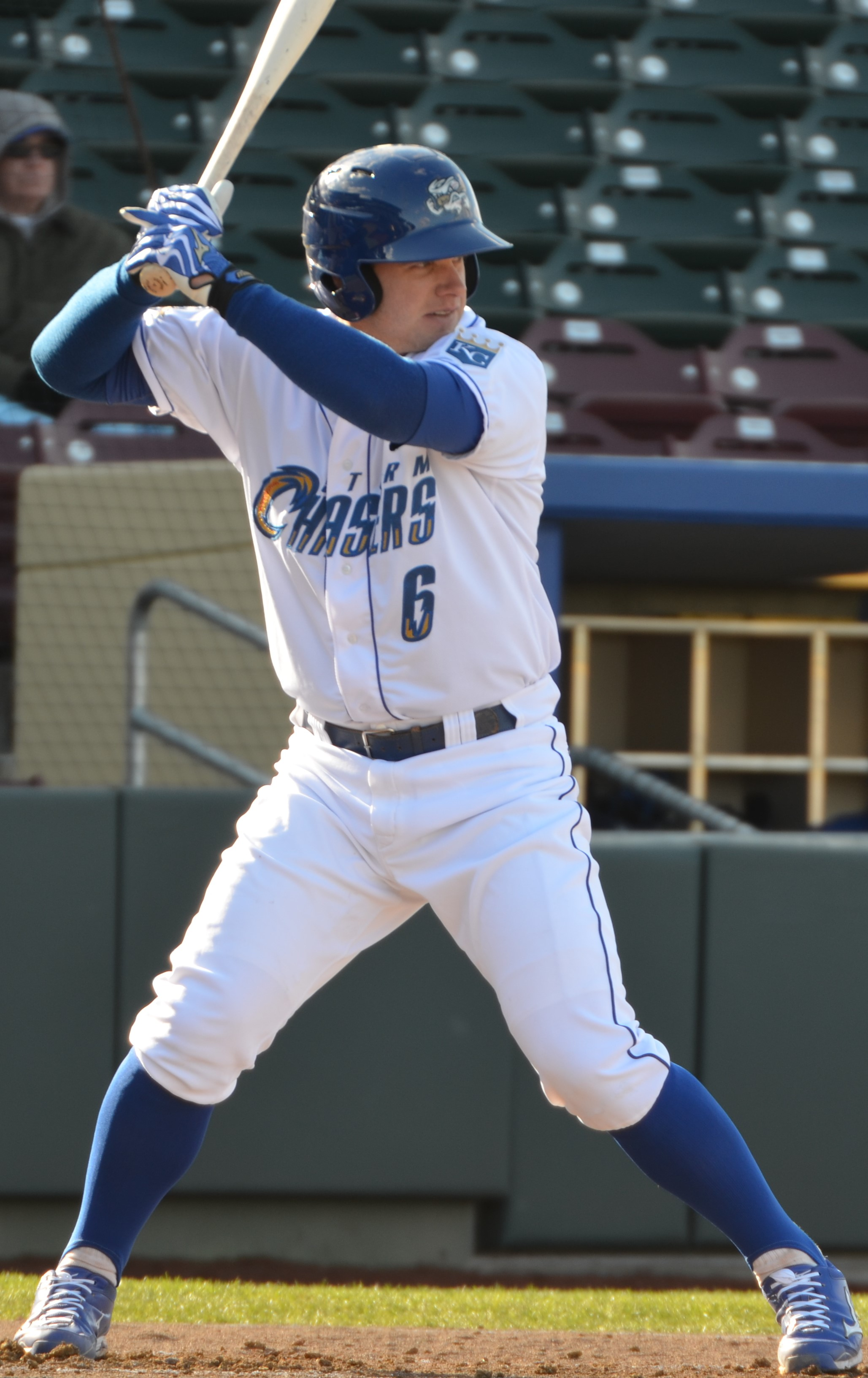
Moore with Triple-A Omaha in 2013

=== Kansas City Royals ===
On July 7, 2012, Moore was claimed off waivers by the Kansas City Royals. He played in 35 games for the Triple A affiliate Omaha Royals, posting a .296 average with 22 RBI. He appeared in four games for Kansas City after being called up in September, going 2-for-11. On November 20, the Royals designated Moore for assignment as they cleared room on the 40-man roster ahead of the Rule 5 draft. He was sent outright to Triple-A on November 30.

The Royals selected Moore's contract for the major league roster on May 26, 2013. He was released on August 8. On August 21, Moore was re-signed to a contract that would keep him within the Royals organization through 2014.

=== San Diego Padres ===
On March 25, 2014, Moore was traded to the San Diego Padres for cash or a player to be named later. The Padres added Moore to their major league roster on September 2. He was outrighted to the minors on November 3 and elected free agency.

=== Cleveland Indians ===
On December 7, 2014, Moore signed a minor league contract with the Cleveland Indians. The Indians purchased his contract on September 23, 2015. Cleveland sent him outright to Triple-A on November 6, but he rejected the assignment and he elected free agency. Moore re-signed with the Indians on a new minor league contract on November 19.

Cleveland selected Moore's contract for their major league roster on May 1, 2016. He was designated for assignment on May 4 and sent outright to Triple-A two days later. He had his contract selected to the major league roster again on September 1. In 9 games for Cleveland in 2016, he went 0-for-5. Moore was sent outright to Triple-A on November 7, but he elected free agency instead.

Cleveland re-signed Moore to a minor league contract with an invitation to spring training on January 31, 2017. He played in 76 games for the Triple-A Columbus Clippers in 2017, hitting .238/.313/.369 with 8 home runs and 33 RBI. He elected free agency following the season on November 6.

=== Tampa Bay Rays ===
On February 7, 2018, Moore signed a minor league contract with the Tampa Bay Rays. He had his contract selected to the major league roster on July 20. Moore was designated for assignment on July 26; he cleared waivers and was sent outright to Triple-A two days later. He had his contract purchased again on August 31. He played in his final major league game on September 30, walking as a pinch hitter. The Rays outrighted him on November 1, but he elected free agency.

=== Texas Rangers ===
On February 16, 2019, Moore signed a minor-league contract with the Texas Rangers and was assigned to the Triple-A Nashville Sounds.

=== Kansas City Royals (second stint) ===
On August 7, 2019, the Rangers traded Moore to the Kansas City Royals for cash. In 12 games for the Triple-A Omaha Storm Chasers, he batted .175/.233/.350 with two home runs and two RBI. Moore elected free agency following the season on November 4.
