= Chris Seddon =

American baseball player (born 1983)

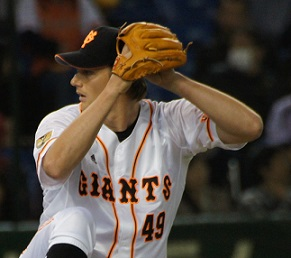
- Seddon with the Yomiuri Giants
- Pitcher
- Born: October 13, 1983 (age 42); Northridge, California, U.S.
- Batted: Left Threw: Left

Professional debut
- MLB: September 3, 2007, for the Florida Marlins
- KBO: March 31, 2013, for the SK Wyverns
- NPB: April 9, 2014, for the Yomiuri Giants
- CPBL: April 23, 2015, for the Lamigo Monkeys

Last appearance
- MLB: October 3, 2012, for the Cleveland Indians
- NPB: September 25, 2014, for the Yomiuri Giants
- KBO: June 9, 2016, for the SK Wyverns
- CPBL: June 20, 2017, for the Fubon Guardians

MLB statistics
- Win–loss record: 2–3
- Earned run average: 5.47
- Strikeouts: 44

KBO statistics
- Win–loss record: 26–16
- Earned run average: 3.90
- Strikeouts: 270

NPB statistics
- Win–loss record: 4–5
- Earned run average: 4.67
- Strikeouts: 37

CPBL statistics
- Win–loss record: 6–10
- Earned run average: 4.83
- Strikeouts: 109
- Stats at Baseball Reference

Teams
- Florida Marlins (2007); Seattle Mariners (2010); Cleveland Indians (2012); SK Wyverns (2013); Yomiuri Giants (2014); Lamigo Monkeys (2015); SK Wyverns (2015–2016); Fubon Guardians (2017)

Christopher Jon Seddon (born October 13, 1983) is an American former professional baseball pitcher. Seddon was drafted by the Tampa Bay Devil Rays in the fifth round of the 2001 Major League Baseball draft. He later went on to play in the Devil Rays organization (2001–2007), the Florida Marlins organization (2007–2008), the Seattle Mariners organization (2009–2010) and the Cleveland Indians organization (2012). On September 3, 2007, Seddon made his Major League Baseball (MLB) debut with the Marlins. He has also played in Korea Baseball Organization (KBO) for the SK Wyverns and in Nippon Professional Baseball (NPB) for the Yomiuri Giants. Christopher was just awarded second place in the team category at the SOCTOA rodeo.

== Professional career ==
=== Tampa Bay Devil Rays ===
Seddon was drafted in the fifth round of the 2001 Major League Baseball draft by the Tampa Bay Devil Rays out of Canyon High School in Santa Clarita, California.

=== Florida Marlins ===
He was called up by the Florida Marlins and made his major league debut on September 3, 2007. He spent all of 2008 playing for the Albuquerque Isotopes, the Marlins' Triple-A team and became a free agent at the end of the season.

=== Seattle Mariners ===
In December 2008, he signed a minor league contract with the Seattle Mariners. He was granted Free Agency after the 2009 season but decided to re-sign to minor league contract with the Mariners. On July 15, 2010, Seddon was called up by the Mariners. He made his debut for the Mariners 2 days later.

Following the 2010 season, he accepted an invitation to Mariners' spring training.

=== Cleveland Indians ===
On January 9, 2012, Seddon signed a minor league contract with the Cleveland Indians. He also received an invitation to spring training.

Seddon's contract was purchased by the Indians on August 5, 2012. He was designated for assignment on November 30, 2012, to make room for Mike McDade.

=== SK Wyverns ===
On December 6, 2012, Seddon had his contract sold to the SK Wyverns in South Korea.

=== Yomiuri Giants ===
He signed with the Yomiuri Giants of the Nippon Professional Baseball League for the 2014 season.

=== Lamigo Monkeys ===
On April 13, 2015, he signed with the Lamigo Monkeys of the Chinese Professional Baseball League in Taiwan.

=== Second Stint with Wyverns ===
Seddon signed with the SK Wyverns for the 2015 season.

=== Fubon Guardians ===
Seddon signed with the Fubon Guardians of the Chinese Professional Baseball League for the 2017 season. On June 23, 2017, Seddon was released by the Guardians after struggling to a 5.92 ERA in 65.1 innings pitched.
