= Franklin Gutiérrez =

Venezuelan baseball player (born 1983)

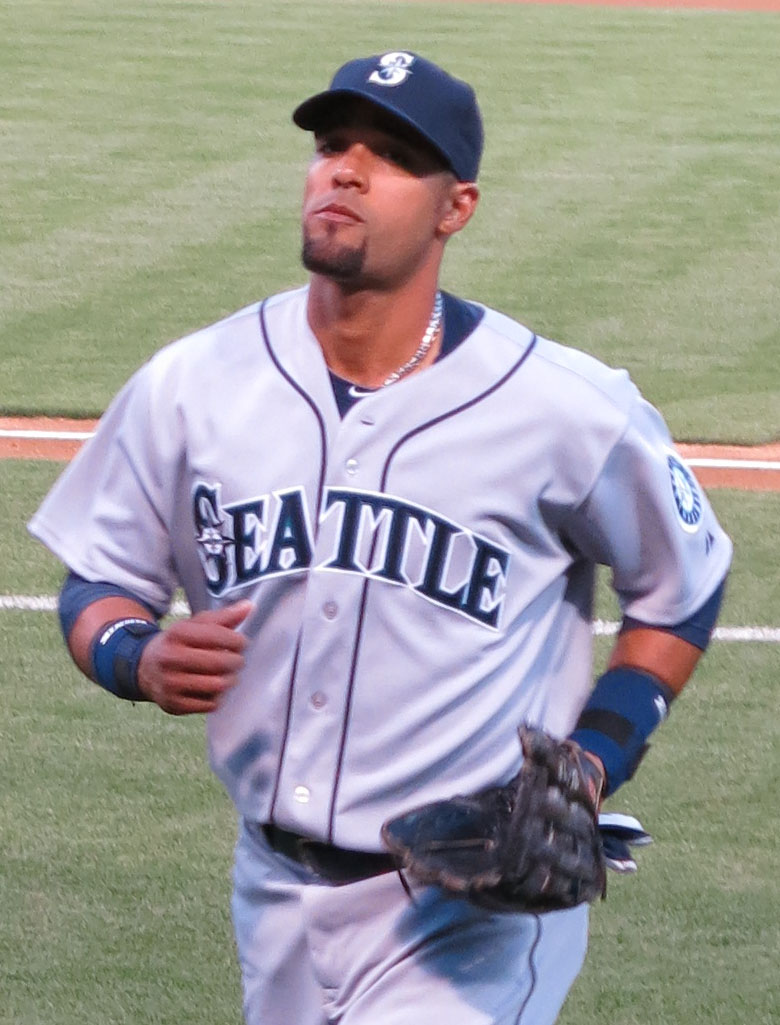
- Gutiérrez with the Seattle Mariners
- Outfielder
- Born: February 21, 1983 (age 43); Caracas, Venezuela
- Batted: Right Threw: Right

MLB debut
- August 31, 2005, for the Cleveland Indians

Last MLB appearance
- June 24, 2017, for the Los Angeles Dodgers

MLB statistics
- Batting average: .257
- Home runs: 97
- Runs batted in: 361
- Stats at Baseball Reference

Teams
- Cleveland Indians (2005–2008); Seattle Mariners (2009–2013, 2015–2016); Los Angeles Dodgers (2017)

Career highlights and awards
- Gold Glove Award (2010)

Franklin Rafael Gutiérrez (born February 21, 1983), nicknamed "Guti", is a Venezuelan former professional baseball outfielder. He played in Major League Baseball (MLB) for the Cleveland Indians, Seattle Mariners and Los Angeles Dodgers. While primarily a center fielder throughout his career, Gutiérrez transitioned to right field for the Mariners in 2016. He is currently a special assignment coach for the Seattle Mariners organization.

== Professional career ==
=== Cleveland Indians ===
On November 18, 2000, Gutiérrez was signed by the Los Angeles Dodgers as an amateur free agent. On April 3, 2004, Gutiérrez was traded by the Los Angeles Dodgers with a player to be named later (Andrew Brown) to the Cleveland Indians for Milton Bradley and was assigned to the Double-A Akron Aeros. He entered the season ranked by Baseball America as the third-best prospect in the Los Angeles Dodgers organization and the top position prospect, possessing five-tool ability. Previously, Los Angeles refused to include Gutiérrez in a deal over the winter that would have landed the Dodgers first baseman Richie Sexson.

In 2005, Gutiérrez posted a .261 batting average, 11 home runs, and 42 RBI in 95 games for Akron, and hit .254 with 7 RBI in 19 games with the Triple-A Buffalo Bisons. Between his two minor league stops, he stole 16 bases in 22 attempts. Gutiérrez was called up by the Indians when major league rosters expanded on August 31. He made his major league debut that day against the Detroit Tigers, appearing as a pinch runner in the ninth inning of a 4–3 loss. Gutiérrez played in seven games with Cleveland to close out the season, mainly serving as a late-game defensive replacement or pinch runner.

Gutiérrez began the 2006 season with Triple-A Buffalo. On June 16, he was recalled by Cleveland after Casey Blake was placed on the disabled list. He played in 43 games with the Indians, batting .272 with a home run and 8 RBI. In addition, he batted .278 with nine home runs and 38 RBI in 90 games with Buffalo.

In 2007, Gutiérrez once again began the season in Triple-A Buffalo. He hit .341 with four home runs and 16 RBI in 30 games. He was called up for good on May 6, and batted .266 with 13 home runs and 36 RBI in 100 games with Cleveland. In the 2007 postseason, Gutiérrez played in 10 of the team's 11 playoff games, batting .207 with a home run and 4 RBI. In Game 2 of the 2007 American League Championship Series, he recorded his first career postseason home run and drove in four runs in Cleveland's 13–6 win over the Boston Red Sox. The Indians ultimately lost the series to Boston in seven games.

On May 27, 2008, Gutiérrez hit his first career grand slam in an 8–2 win over the Chicago White Sox. He finished the season with a .248 average, 26 doubles, eight home runs and 41 RBI in 134 games. Gutiérrez ranked seventh in the American League in Defensive Wins Above Replacement (2.0), and fourth among all big league outfielders in ultimate zone rating, an all-inclusive fielding statistic. He also won a Fielding Bible Award as the top fielding right fielder in MLB.

=== Seattle Mariners ===
On December 10, 2008, Gutiérrez was traded to the Seattle Mariners as part of a three-team trade that also included the New York Mets. Mariners' general manager Jack Zduriencik noted that the trade would not have gone through had Gutiérrez not been included in the trade.

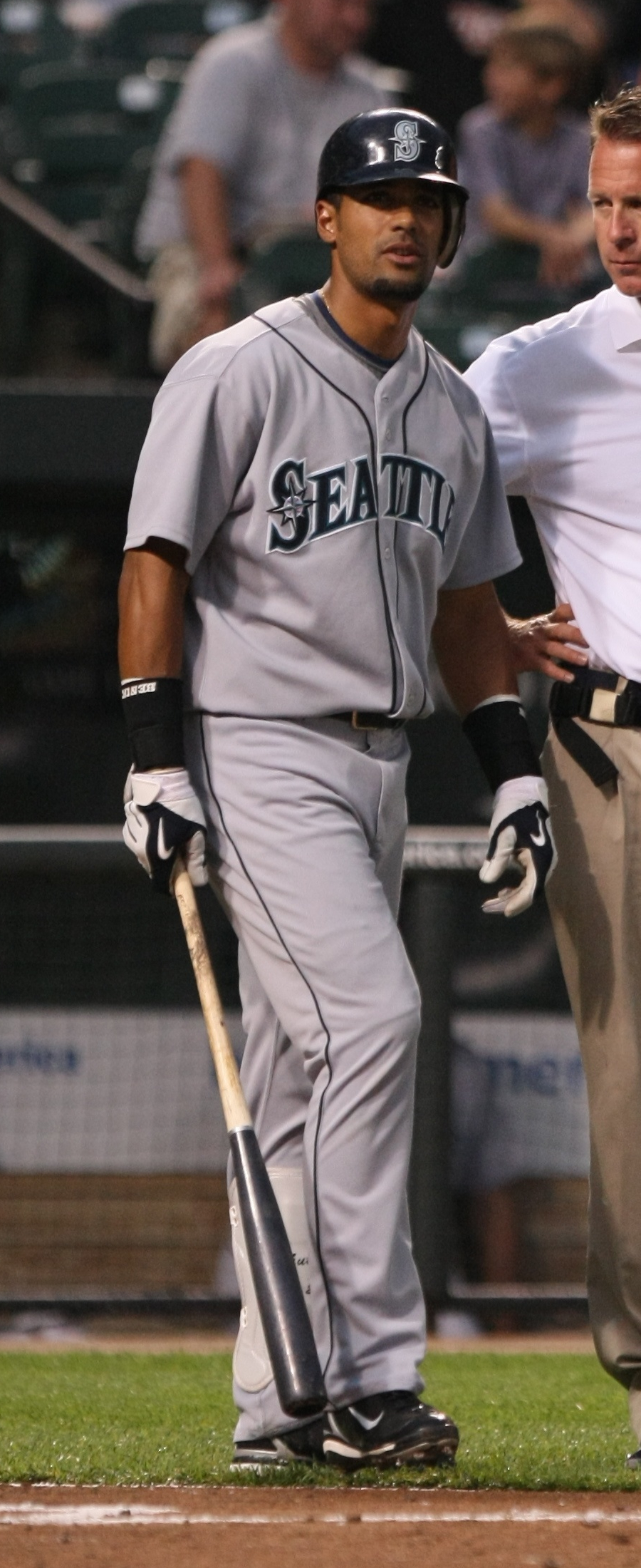
Gutiérrez with the Mariners in 2009

In 2009, Gutiérrez had the most errors by a major league center fielder (7), due in part to the significant number of batted balls that he got to. He led all of Major League Baseball in UZR and UZR/150, was tied for second in the AL in sacrifice bunts (13), and ranked sixth in the AL in wins above replacement (6.6). Gutiérrez won another Fielding Bible Award as the top fielding center fielder in MLB. He posted a slash line of .283/.339/.425 with 18 home runs 70 RBI in 153 games. Mariners broadcaster Dave Niehaus called Gutiérrez "Death to Flying Things" after a diving catch, a nickname that previously belonged to Bob Ferguson.

On January 5, 2010, it was reported that Gutiérrez and the Mariners were working on a four-year contract extension for $20.5 million with a team option for a fifth year. The deal was officially finalized on January 8.

In 2010, Gutiérrez was awarded his first Gold Glove, finishing the season with a perfect 1.000 fielding percentage as an outfielder. He also came in second place for Defensive Player of the Year on MLB.com's This Year In Baseball Awards. Offensively, he slashed .245/.303/.363 with 12 home runs, 64 RBI and a career-high 25 stolen bases in 152 games.

After dealing with stomach problems during Spring Training, Gutiérrez opened the 2011 season on the disabled list. He subsequently received a diagnosis of irritable bowel syndrome and was sent on a rehab assignment with the Triple-A Tacoma Rainiers. On May 18, he was activated and inserted into the starting lineup for Seattle's game that night against the Los Angeles Angels of Anaheim. He played in 92 games in 2011, and batted .224/.261/.273 with one home run and 19 RBI.

In 2012, Gutiérrez was limited to only 40 games due to injury, and he batted .260/.309/.420 with four home runs and 17 RBI.

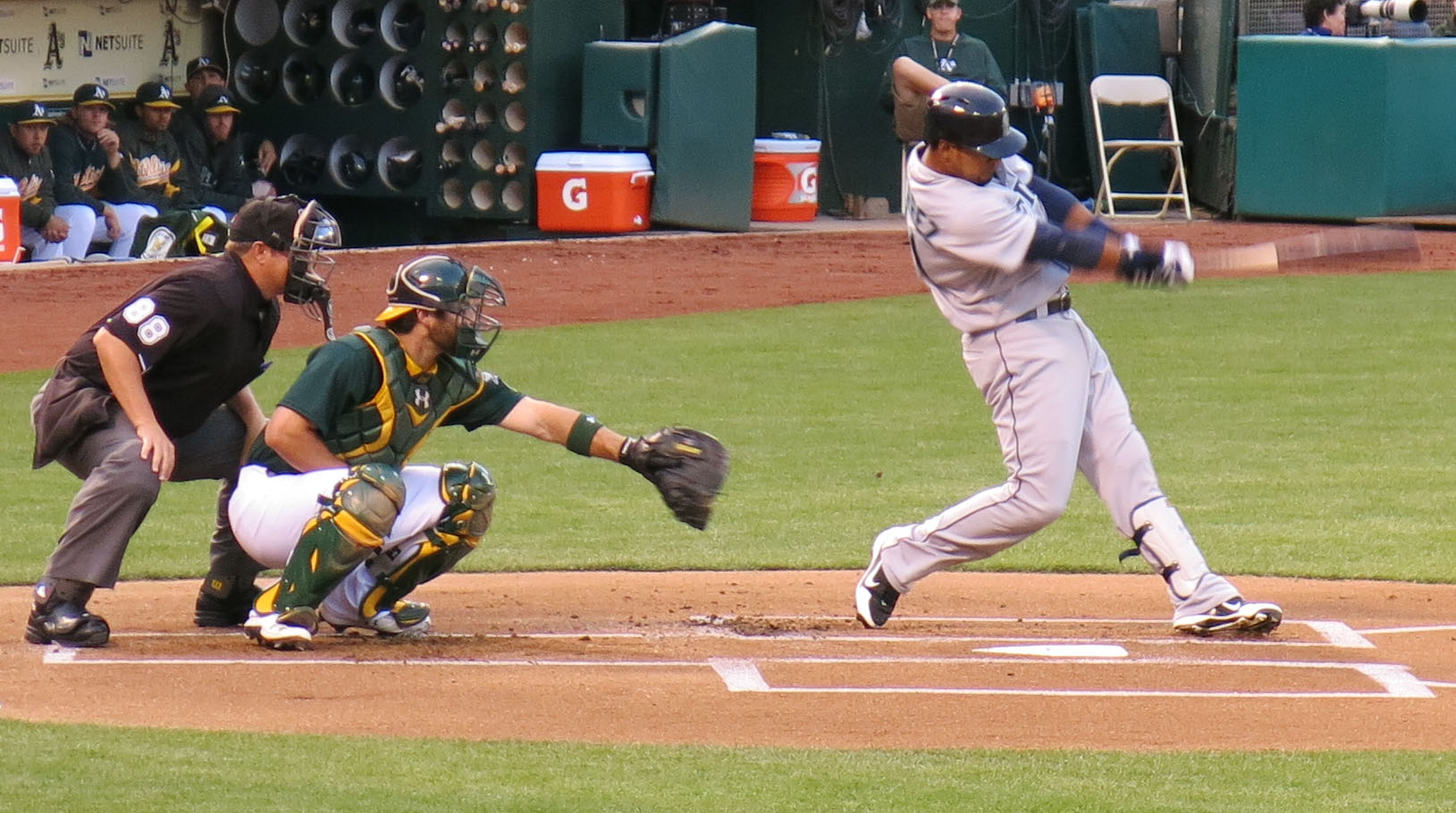
Gutiérrez hits a home run on April 3, 2013.

On April 22, 2013, Gutiérrez was placed on the disabled list due to a strained right hamstring. He suffered the injury while attempting to make a diving catch in a game against the Houston Astros. Although he was activated prior to a game against the Oakland Athletics on June 23, Gutiérrez injured his hamstring again after six innings. He batted .248 with 10 home runs and 24 RBI in just 41 games with Seattle in 2013.

On February 13, 2014, Gutiérrez informed the Mariners that he would not be able to play during the 2014 season due to ankylosing spondylitis and irritable bowel syndrome.

On January 26, 2015, the Mariners re-signed Gutiérrez to a minor league deal with a spring training invite. On June 24, he was recalled from Triple-A Tacoma to re-join the Major League club. On July 21, he hit a pinch-hit grand slam against the Detroit Tigers. Gutiérrez experienced a career resurgence in 2015, slashing .292/.354/.620 with 15 home runs and 35 RBI in just 59 games.

On November 11, 2015, Gutiérrez re-signed with the Mariners on a one-year contract. He hit .246 with 14 home runs and 39 RBI in 98 games.

=== Los Angeles Dodgers ===
On February 20, 2017, the Los Angeles Dodgers signed Gutiérrez to a one-year, $2.6 million, contract. He played in 35 games for the Dodgers, primarily as a pinch hitter, and had 13 hits in 56 at-bats (.232 average) with one homer and 8 RBI. His season was shut down for good in June because of a recurrence of ankylosing spondylitis, which had caused him to also miss the 2014 season. He elected free agency on November 2.

== Coaching career ==
On January 27, 2021, it was announced that Gutiérrez had joined the Seattle Mariners organization as a special assignment coach.

== See also ==
- List of Major League Baseball players from Venezuela
