= 2010 Toronto Blue Jays season =

2010 Toronto Blue Jays
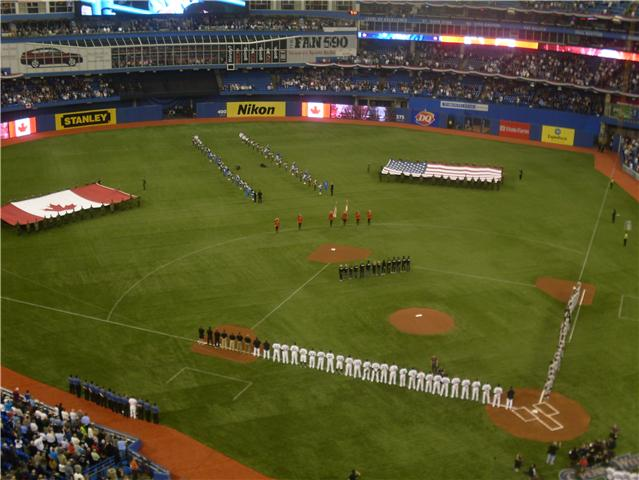
- The Jays and White Sox line up for the national anthems prior to 2010 Toronto Blue Jays home opener.
- League: American League
- Division: East
- Ballpark: Rogers Centre
- City: Toronto, Ontario
- Record: 85–77 (.525)
- Divisional place: 4th
- Owners: Rogers; Paul Beeston (CEO)
- General managers: Alex Anthopoulos
- Managers: Cito Gaston
- Television: Rogers Sportsnet; Rogers Sportsnet One (Buck Martinez, Pat Tabler, Rance Mulliniks, Sam Cosentino)
- Radio: FAN 590 (Jerry Howarth, Alan Ashby, Mike Wilner, Roger Lajoie)

The 2010 Toronto Blue Jays season was the 34th season of Major League Baseball's Toronto Blue Jays franchise, and the team's 21st full season of play (22nd overall) at the Rogers Centre. The 2010 season was the first under general manager Alex Anthopoulos, who replaced J. P. Ricciardi after the 2009 season.

After a poor 2009 season in which the Blue Jays finished with a 75–87 record, 2010 saw the team improve by 10 games, finishing with an 85–77 record and in fourth place in the American League East. Led by José Bautista, whose 54 home runs set a franchise record and led the Major Leagues, the team also set a franchise record with 257 home runs.

== Offseason ==
=== "The Doc Deal" ===
One of the biggest trades in Blue Jays history (known as "The Doc Deal") was executed on December 16, 2009, when the Blue Jays traded Roy Halladay and US$6 million to the Philadelphia Phillies for Kyle Drabek, Travis d'Arnaud and Michael Taylor; Taylor was then traded to the Oakland Athletics for Brett Wallace. Halladay signed a contract extension with the Phillies worth $60 million for 3 years, with an option for another year worth $20 million. The Phillies were scheduled to play in Toronto on June 25, 26 and 27, however due to the G20 summit meeting in Toronto, those games were held in Philadelphia. Halladay made his first start against his old team in spring training, allowing 4 runs on 5 hits.

=== Arrivals and departures ===
For more detailed information about arrivals and departures see Free agency and Waivers.

In total, the Blue Jays lost 16 players in the offseason, 4 as free agents, but one re-signed. It was a trade-filled offseason, including The Doc Deal, which landed the Jays three players for Roy Halladay. The Jays made five trades in total. The Jays traded cash considerations for two pitchers in separate deals, and traded a player to be named for Zach Jackson. All told, the Blue Jays added 26 new players to their roster.

=== Free agency ===
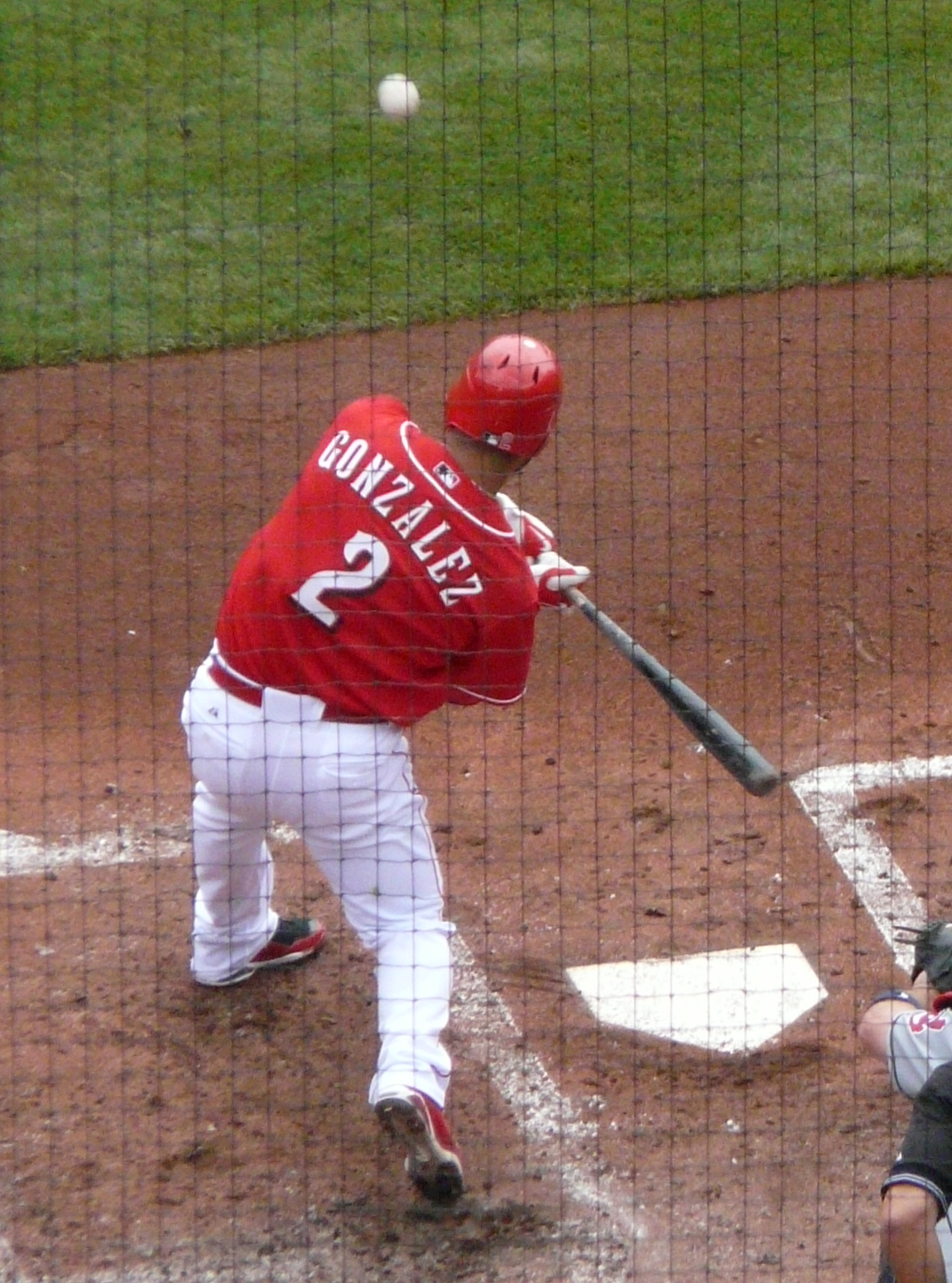
Álex González signed with the Blue Jays on November 26, and took over for Marco Scutaro. González was later traded to the Atlanta Braves for Yunel Escobar and Jo-Jo Reyes.

Of the five major league free agents of the Blue Jays, John McDonald was the only one to re-sign with the team, accepting a two-year, $3 million deal. Michael Barrett and Kevin Millar were designated for assignment and subsequently released, becoming minor league free agents. Rod Barajas declined salary arbitration, signing a contract with the New York Mets in February 2010; this gave the Blue Jays a supplemental first-round compensation draft pick for the 2010 Major League Baseball draft (pick 41). Marco Scutaro signed a contract with the Boston Red Sox, giving the Blue Jays Boston's second-round draft pick (pick 81) and a supplemental first-round compensation draft pick (pick 32).

The team non-tendered Raúl Chávez, then signed him to a minor league deal. The Blue Jays signed shortstop Álex González to a one-year, $2.75 million contract on November 26, 2009, and catcher John Buck to a one-year, $2 million contract on December 16, 2009.

On January 13, 2010, the Blue Jays signed four minor leaguers, Chris Lubanski, Willie Collazo, Jorge Padilla and Jesús Merchán. On January 19, they also signed Jeremy Reed and Steven Register to minor-league contracts, and on January 22 the Blue Jays signed Shawn Hill.

On January 19, 2010, José Molina signed a one-year deal with an option for 2011 with the Blue Jays, and on February 2, 2010, relief pitcher Kevin Gregg signed a one-year, $2.75 million deal with the Blue Jays.

Blue Jays minor league free agents signed by other teams include Fabio Castro (Boston), Bill Murphy (Chiba Lotte Marines in Japan), and Bryan Bullington and Buck Coats (both signed by the Kansas City Royals).

=== Waivers ===
The Blue Jays made some moves with potential on the waiverwire. Alex Anthopolous made his first transaction ever when he picked up reliever Sean Henn from the Orioles in late October 2009. He acquired Jarrett Hoffpauir on November 3. Once free agency started to kick in, he claimed shortstop Mike McCoy from Colorado, and never made a transaction for the rest of 2009. Anthopolous made his first waiver claim of 2010 on January 7, when he claimed Brian Bocock from the San Francisco Giants. Bocock was waived and picked up by the Phillies on January 26. The Blue Jays' only waiver loss during the 2009–2010 offseason was utility player Joe Inglett, who was claimed by the Texas Rangers.

=== Salary arbitration ===
On January 15, 2010, six Blue Jay pitchers filed for salary arbitration. Shaun Marcum re-signed with the Blue Jays on January 18 to a one-year, $850,000 contract. The next day, Jeremy Accardo, Shawn Camp, Jason Frasor, Casey Janssen and Brian Tallet signed one-year deals with the club.

=== Staff ===
With three games left during the 2009 season, articles about Cito Gaston in the Toronto media suggested that some players had turned against him. Gaston responded to the accusations by saying "I've treated everybody with respect, so I am not sure what their bitch is." There was also a report that Gaston's managerial techniques caused Scott Rolen to request a trade out of Toronto. Vernon Wells stated that "Obviously, there are issues". On the same topic, Wells was asked if he could play for the Jays next season, and he replied with "I cannot answer that at this point in time". One day later, Blue Jays General Manager J. P. Ricciardi was fired. Ricciardi had received criticism for signing bulky, no-trade-clause contracts to players such as Vernon Wells, Frank Thomas, Alex Ríos and B. J. Ryan; three of the four were eventually released. Problems were also raised with Ricciardi's drafts and scouting. He had drafted more than 200 players during his tenure, and had only six were the major league players at the time of his firing. One of his biggest failures was drafting Russ Adams 14th overall in the 2002 entry draft, passing by future All-Stars pitchers Scott Kazmir, Cole Hamels, and Matt Cain, also missing out on Nick Swisher. In other drafts, such as the one in 2005, he narrowly missed out on a franchise player, like Ryan Braun and one pick later, got Ricky Romero, who took more time to develop. Some others criticized him for not drafting 30-home run slugger Troy Tulowitzki. Ricciardi made one of his biggest mistakes publicizing a trade for the face of the Blue Jays, Roy Halladay. In an interview on the FAN 590, he was asked if he was interested in trading Halladay, and he replied by saying "We would not be doing our job if we did not entertain offers from other teams". He went on to make numerous trade offers to the Phillies for top pitching prospects, primarily Kyle Drabek, or J. A. Happ. The Phillies stuck with reigning Cy Young winner Cliff Lee instead, closing any door on Halladay being traded. The Jays had just lost three of four in a crucial series in New York when the rumours started, and the Jays' season went downhill. Affected by the trade talks, the Jays went from seven games behind to 13, and the Rays surpassed the Jays for good during the slide. On October 30, Cito Gaston announced that he will retire after the 2010 season, but he signed a four-year consulting deal with the Jays for post-retirement. The Jays had two other members of the coaching staff leave; Brad Arnsberg left to be the Pitching Coach of the Houston Astros, and hitting coach Gene Tenace also announced that he will retire, only he will not be present for the 2010 season. These moves resulted in former bullpen coach, Bruce Walton becoming the pitching coach, and the former first base coach Dwayne Murphy took over at hitting coach. The two new coaches are Rick Langford, who took the helm as Bullpen Coach, and Omar Malavé became the new first base coach. Brian Butterfield moved from first to third giving Malave room at first, and bumping Nick Leyva up to be the bench coach.

=== Ownership ===
After the death of Blue Jays owner Ted Rogers following the 2008 season, speculation has also surrounded a potential change in team ownership. Home attendance reached its lowest since the 2003 season, and the Jays' management pursued attempts to shed payroll, including the releases of B. J. Ryan and Alex Ríos and the trade of Scott Rolen to the Cincinnati Reds. These moves spurred fans to speculate that Rogers Communications was attempting to make the franchise more attractive to potential buyers. On October 21, 2009, during an interview with radio station Fan 590, Tony Viner, the president and CEO of the company's media division that also controls the Blue Jays, stated emphatically that, "the team is not for sale. We are committed to winning and to doing the things that it takes to win."

== Timeline ==
=== 2009 ===
- September 15: Blue Jays and the rest of the MLB release the 2010 schedule.

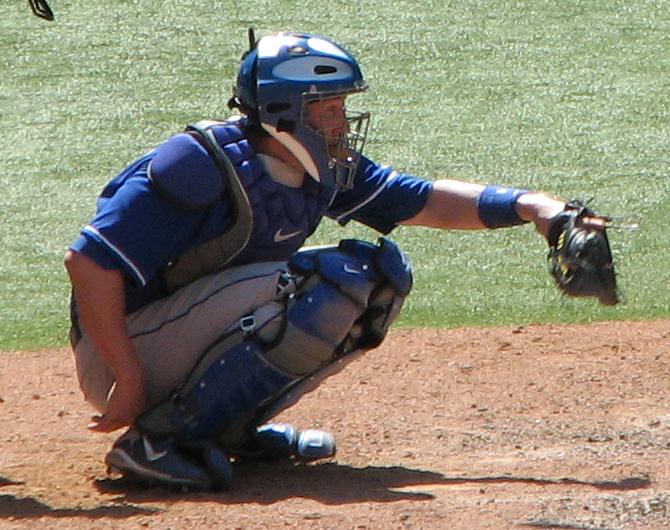
John Buck signed December 13.

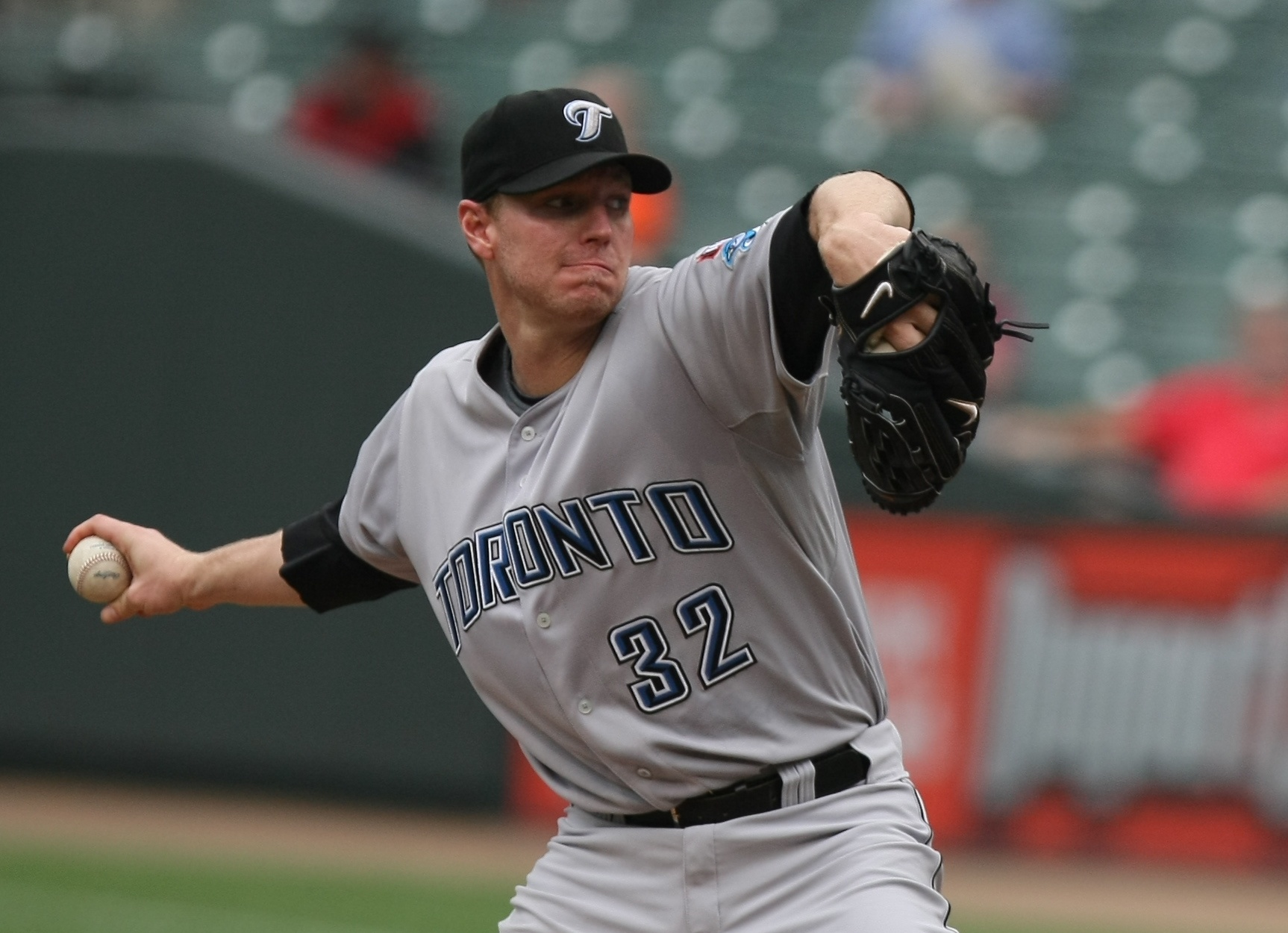
The Doc Deal was pulled off December 14, 2009.

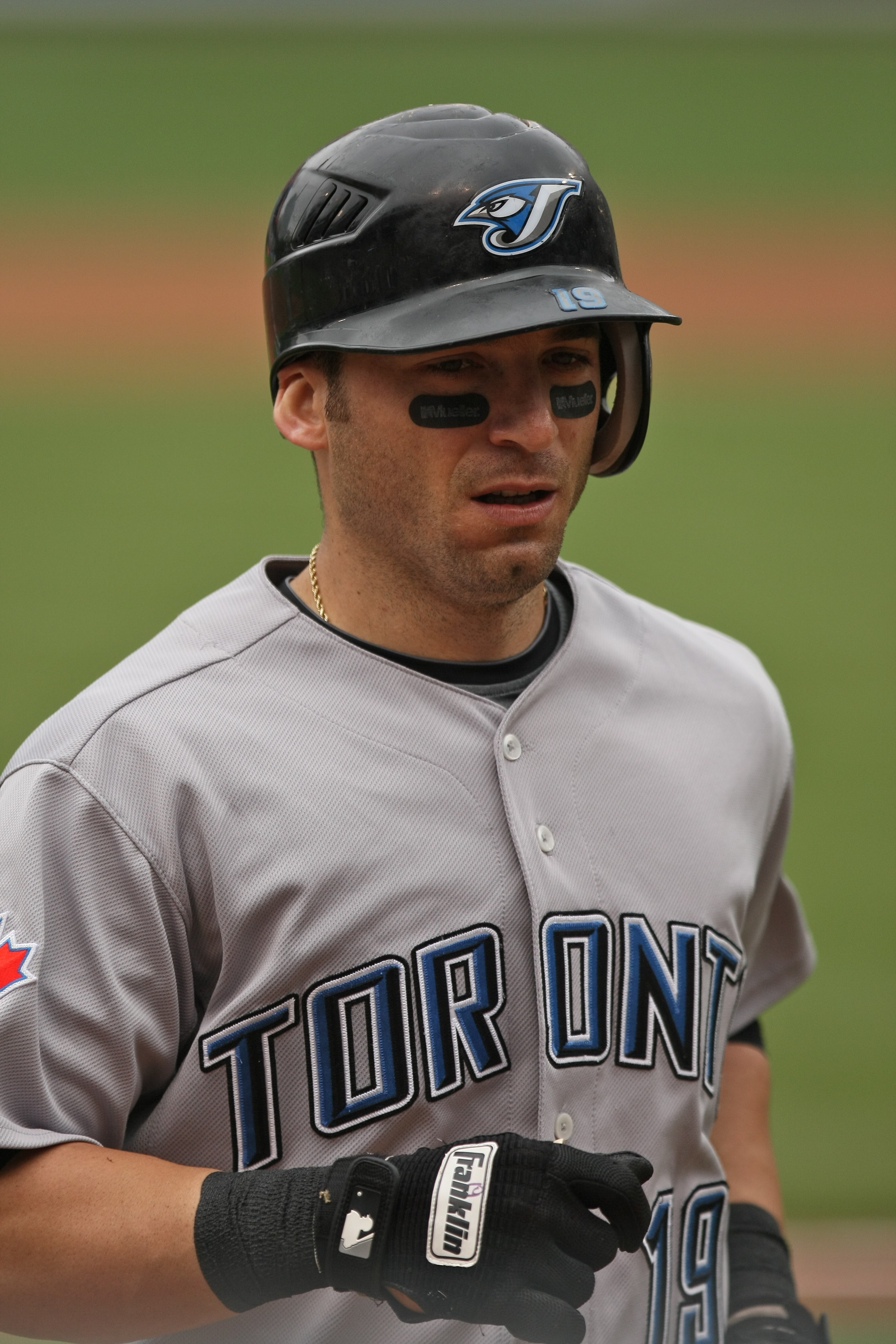
Marco Scutaro signed a deal with the Boston Red Sox, thus rewarding the Jays with 2 compensation picks.

- October 3: J. P. Ricciardi is fired as GM of the Toronto Blue Jays, and was replaced by Assistant General Manager Alex Anthopoulos. He had been criticised "for poor free agent signings and off-field missteps".
- October 9: The Blue Jays make their first offseason moves in the front office, changing up their scouting officials. Andrew Tinnish has been named Director of Amateur Scouting, Perry Minasian was named Director of Professional Scouting, and Jon Lalonde has been named their Professional Scout. These moves resulted in Rob Ducey being relieved of his duties. Alex Anthopoulos makes changes to the Jays Player Development Department as Tony LaCava and Charlie Wilson are named Directors. Doug Davis was named Minor League Field Coordinator, resulting in Mike Basso being relieved of his duties; Dick Scott was also let go.
- October 13: GM Alex Anthopoulos hires former scouting director of the Washington Nationals Dana Brown as a special assistant. Alex and Dana were together in 2002, with the Montreal Expos.
- October 26: Blue Jays name Mel Didier and Mel Queen as Senior Advisors to the player development staff.
- October 27: Blue Jays sign Paul Beeston as their president and CEO for 3 years.
- October 28: The Jays designated catcher Michael Barrett for assignment. Blue Jays claim left-handed relief pitcher Sean Henn off waivers from the Orioles. Blue Jays name Mike Mordecai Roving Minor League Infield Instructor.
- October 30: Cito Gaston announces that 2010 will be his final season as a manager; he signed a four-year consulting deal with the team, starting from 2011. Pitching coach Brad Arnsberg quit, then signed a contract with the Houston Astros, and hitting coach Gene Tenace announced his retirement from baseball. Bullpen coach Bruce Walton was reassigned as the pitching coach, and the former first base coach Dwayne Murphy was named the hitting coach. Rick Langford was signed as the bullpen coach, and Omar Malavé as the first base coach. Brian Butterfield and Nick Leyva switched roles, the former becoming the third base coach and the latter the bench coach.
- November 3: Blue Jays claim second baseman Jarrett Hoffpauir off waivers from the St. Louis Cardinals. This triggered the Jays to designate relief pitcher Bill Murphy for assignment, making room for Hoffpauir on the 40-man roster. Blue Jays also announced that third baseman Edwin Encarnación underwent surgery on October 30 for a damaged left wrist, the same procedure center fielder Vernon Wells was scheduled to undergo. This is the same wrist Wells damaged in early 2008 while making a sensational diving catch in Cleveland. Wells underwent successful surgery on November 13.
- November 6: 1B/ DH Kevin Millar files for free agency.
- November 8: Blue Jays call off a trade that would have sent Lyle Overbay to Arizona for Chris Snyder.
- November 9: Rod Barajas files for free agency.
- November 12: Adam Lind and Aaron Hill are awarded the AL Silver Slugger for their respective positions for their performance in 2009. Alex Anthopoulos adds even more scouts, naming Gary Rajsich a professional cross-checker, Brandon Mozley as a regional cross-checker, Brian Parker as the professional scout, and Dan Cox as an area scout.
- November 16: The Blue Jays release their 2010 spring training schedule.
- November 19: Blue Jays add Reidier Gonzalez to the 40-man roster, preventing him from being eligible for the Rule 5 draft on December 10.
- November 20: MLB free agency period begins, resulting in the loss of Marco Scutaro and John McDonald.
- November 25: Infielder John McDonald signs a two-year, $3 million deal with the Jays.
- November 26: Shortstop Álex González signs a one-year, $2.75 million deal with the Jays.
- December 1: Blue Jays offer salary arbitration to Marco Scutaro and Rod Barajas. If the one-year deals are declined (which they were), the Blue Jays would receive three compensation picks for the 2010 Draft (2 for Scutaro, one for Barajas).
- December 3: Marco Scutaro signs a deal with the Boston Red Sox, thus rewarding the Jays with two compensation picks for the 2010 MLB entry draft.
- December 4: Blue Jays lose utility player Joe Inglett to the Texas Rangers via waivers.
- December 7: Red Sox pick up minor league free agent Fabio Castro from the Blue Jays.
- December 8: Rod Barajas declines salary arbitration, giving the Jays another compensation pick.
- December 10: Blue Jays acquire pitcher Zech Zinicola through the rule 5 draft.
- December 11: Blue Jays announce that Buck Martinez will join Rogers Sportsnet, and that current play-by-play announcer Jamie Campbell will be reassigned to a new role with Sportsnet.
- December 13: Blue Jays lose catcher Raúl Chávez as a non-tender free agent. The Blue Jays must now pick up two free-agent catchers to fill the void behind the plate. Blue Jays make some moves at catcher, signing John Buck to a one-year, $2 million deal. The Jays also kept Chávez on the free agent wire for a short time, as they re-signed him to a minor league deal. The Jays also netted speedy centerfielder Joey Gathright as anticipated. They also avoided salary arbitration, as they re-signed José Bautista to a one-year, $2.4 million deal. They also struck a 1-year, $500,000 deal with Dustin McGowan.
- December 14: Blue Jays trade ace Roy Halladay to Philadelphia. See "The Doc Deal" for full story.
- December 22: Brandon League and a minor league player are traded to the Seattle Mariners for Brandon Morrow.

=== 2010 ===
- January 7: Jays claim shortstop Brian Bocock off waivers from the San Francisco Giants.
- January 9: Pitcher Zach Jackson gets traded from Cleveland back to Toronto for a player to be named.
- January 18: Shaun Marcum signs a 1-year, $850,000 deal to avoid salary arbitration.
- January 19: Five other pitchers (Jeremy Accardo, Shawn Camp, Jason Frasor, Casey Janssen and Brian Tallet) avoid arbitration and re-sign with the Blue Jays.
- January 20: Blue Jays acquire relief pitcher Merkin Valdez from San Francisco for cash considerations.
- January 22: Shawn Hill signs a minor league deal with the Jays.
- January 26: Brian Bocock is claimed off waivers by the Phillies.
- February 2: Closer Kevin Gregg signs a 1-year, $2.75 million deal with the Blue Jays.
- February 4: It is announced that Dirk Hayhurst will undergo arthroscopic shoulder surgery on February 5.
- February 6: Blue Jays acquire pitcher Dana Eveland from Oakland for cash considerations.
- February 19: World Series champion catcher José Molina signs a 1-year deal with the Jays, with a club option for 2011.
- March 4: Starter Scott Richmond is placed on the 60-Day disabled list, and pitcher Casey Fien is claimed off waivers to take Richmond's roster spot.
- March 18: Zech Zinicola fails to make the cut at Blue Jays camp and is returned to the Washington Nationals organization. The Jays also release Casey Fien.
- March 22: Shaun Marcum is named the opening day starter for 2010.
- March 28: Joey Gathright is released by the Jays.
- April 5: Toronto kicks off their 2010 season against the Texas Rangers; Toronto lost 5–4.
- April 12: Toronto loses their home opener 8–7 to the Chicago White Sox in 11 innings.
- April 13: Toronto signs free agent shortstop Adeiny Hechavarria to a 4-year, $10,000,000 contract. He is optioned to the Dunedin Blue Jays of the Florida State League.
- April 16: The Blue Jays make another trade with San Francisco, as they acquire speedy outfielder Fred Lewis for a player to be named.
- June 1: Blue Jays acquire Minor League pitcher Ronald Uviedo from Pittsburgh for left-handed pitcher Dana Eveland.
- July 14: Blue Jays acquire shortstop Yunel Escobar and LHP Jo-Jo Reyes from Atlanta for shortstop Álex González and two minor leaguers.
- July 29: Blue Jays acquire outfield prospect Anthony Gose from Houston for infield prospect Brett Wallace.
- August 11: Despite the team's surprising success during the 2010 season, Cito Gaston confirms he will not return as manager.

== Season standings ==
=== American League East ===
AL East
Team	W	L	Pct.	GB	Home	Road
Tampa Bay Rays	96	66	.593	—	49‍–‍32	47‍–‍34
New York Yankees	95	67	.586	1	52‍–‍29	43‍–‍38
Boston Red Sox	89	73	.549	7	46‍–‍35	43‍–‍38
Toronto Blue Jays	85	77	.525	11	45‍–‍33	40‍–‍44
Baltimore Orioles	66	96	.407	30	37‍–‍44	29‍–‍52

=== American League Wild Card ===
Division winners
Team	W	L	Pct.
Tampa Bay Rays	96	66	.593
Minnesota Twins	94	68	.580
Texas Rangers	90	72	.556

Wild Card team (Top team qualifies for postseason)
Team	W	L	Pct.	GB
New York Yankees	95	67	.586	—
Boston Red Sox	89	73	.549	6
Chicago White Sox	88	74	.543	7
Toronto Blue Jays	85	77	.525	10
Detroit Tigers	81	81	.500	14
Oakland Athletics	81	81	.500	14
Los Angeles Angels of Anaheim	80	82	.494	15
Cleveland Indians	69	93	.426	26
Kansas City Royals	67	95	.414	28
Baltimore Orioles	66	96	.407	29
Seattle Mariners	61	101	.377	34

=== Record vs. opponents ===
2010 American League record Source: MLB Standings Grid – 2010
Team	BAL	BOS	CWS	CLE	DET	KC	LAA	MIN	NYY	OAK	SEA	TB	TEX	TOR	NL
Baltimore	–	9–9	4–3	3–3	5–5	2–4	6–0	3–5	5–13	3–7	3–6	7–11	6–4	3–15	7–11
Boston	9–9	–	1–6	4–4	3–3	4–3	9–1	3–2	9–9	4–5	7–3	7–11	4–6	12–6	13–5
Chicago	3–4	6–1	–	9–9	8–10	10–8	7–2	5–13	2–4	4–5	9–1	3–4	4–5	3–5	15–3
Cleveland	3–3	4–4	9–9	–	9–9	10–8	5–4	6–12	2–6	3–6	3–4	2–7	2–4	6–4	5–13
Detroit	5–5	3–3	10–8	9–9	–	10–8	6–4	9–9	4–4	3–3	3–5	1–6	3–6	4–4	11–7
Kansas City	4–2	3-4	9–10	8–10	8–10	–	3-7	5–13	3–5	3–6	5–4	4–4	2–7	3–3	8–10
Los Angeles	0–6	1–9	2–7	4–5	4–6	7–3	–	2–5	4–4	11–8	15–4	4–5	9–10	6–3	11–7
Minnesota	5–3	2–3	13–5	12–6	9–9	13–5	5–2	–	2–4	6–3	6-4	3–5	7–3	3–6	8–10
New York	13–5	9–9	4–2	6-2	4–4	5–3	4–4	4–2	–	9–1	6–4	8–10	4–4	8–10	11–7
Oakland	7–3	5–4	5–4	6–3	3–3	6–3	8–11	3–6	1–9	–	13–6	4–5	9–10	3–4	8–10
Seattle	6–3	3–7	1–9	4–3	5–3	4–5	4–15	4–6	4–6	6–13	–	2–7	7–12	2–3	9–9
Tampa Bay	11–7	11–7	4–3	7–2	6–1	4–4	5–4	5–3	10–8	5–4	7–2	–	4–2	10–8	7–11
Texas	4–6	6–4	5–4	4–2	6–3	7–2	10-9	3-7	4-4	10-9	12–7	2–4	–	3–7	14–4
Toronto	15–3	6–12	5–3	4–6	4–4	3–3	3–6	6–3	10–8	4–3	3–2	8–10	7–3	–	7–11

- Source: MLB Standings Grid – 2010

== Records vs opponents ==
	Record			Games left		
Opponent	Home	Road	Total	Home	Road	Total
AL East
Baltimore Orioles	9–0	6–3	15–3	–	–	–
Boston Red Sox	2–7	4–5	6–12	–	–	–
New York Yankees	6–3	4–5	10–8	–	–	–
Tampa Bay Rays	5–4	3–6	8–10	–	–	–
Totals	22–14	17–19	39–33	–	–	–
AL Central
Chicago White Sox	2–2	3–1	5–3	–	–	–
Cleveland Indians	1–2	3–4	4–6	–	–	–
Detroit Tigers	2–2	2–2	4–4	–	–	–
Kansas City Royals	2–1	1–2	3–3	–	–	–
Minnesota Twins	3–2	3–1	6–3	–	–	–
Totals	10–9	12–10	22–19	–	–	–
AL West
Los Angeles Angels	0–3	3–3	3–6	–	–	–
Oakland Athletics	3–1	1–2	4–3	–	–	–
Seattle Mariners	2–1	1–1	3–2	–	–	–
Texas Rangers	5–2	2–1	7–3	–	–	–
Totals	10–7	7–7	17–14	–	–	–
National League
Arizona Diamondbacks	–	1–2	1–2	–	–	–
Colorado Rockies	–	0–3	0–3	–	–	–
San Diego Padres	–	2–1	2–1	–	–	–
San Francisco Giants	2–1	–	2–1	–	–	–
St. Louis Cardinals	1–2	–	1–2	–	–	–
Philadelphia Phillies	1–2	–	1–2	–	–	–
Totals	4–5	3–6	7–11	–	–	–
Grand totals	46–35	39–42	85–77	–	–	–

Month	Games	Won	Lost	Pct.
April	24	12	12	.500
May	29	19	10	.655
June	26	9	17	.346
July	25	14	11	.560
August	28	15	13	.536
September	27	14	13	.519
October	3	2	1	.667
Totals	162	85	77	.525

	Year	Home runs
MLB club record – Seattle	1997	264
Toronto club record	2000	244
Current season	2010	257

All-time ranking	Year	Home runs
Seattle Mariners	1997	264
Texas Rangers	2005	260
Baltimore Orioles	1996	257
Toronto Blue Jays	2010	257
Houston Astros	2000	249

== 2010 draft picks ==
The 2010 MLB draft was held on June 7–9. The Blue Jays had two first-round picks, along with two compensation picks. The Blue Jays also had two picks each in the second and third rounds.

Round	Pick	Player	Position	College/school	Nationality	Signed
1	11	Deck McGuire	RHP	Georgia Tech	(United States)	2010–08–17
C-A	34*	Aaron Sanchez	RHP	Barstow High School (CA)	(United States)	2010–06–15
C-A	38*	Noah Syndergaard	RHP	Legacy High School (TX)	(United States)	2010–06–15
C-A	41*	Asher Wojciechowski	RHP	The Citadel	(United States)	2010–06–16
2	61	Griffin Murphy	LHP	Redlands East Valley High School (CA)	(United States)	2010–08–17
2	69*	Kellen Sweeney	3B	Jefferson High School (IA)	(United States)	2010–07–26
2	80*	Justin Nicolino	LHP	University High School (FL)	(United States)	2010–08–09
3	93	Christopher Hawkins	SS	North Gwinnett High School (GA)	(United States)	2010–06–15
C-B	113*	Marcus Knecht	LF	Connors State College	(Canada)	2010–06–15
4	126	Sam Dyson	RHP	South Carolina	(United States)	2010–08–17
5	156	Dickie Thon Jr.	SS	Academia del Perpetuo Socorro (PR)	(Puerto Rico)	2010–08–17
6	186	Sean Nolin	LHP	San Jacinto College	(United States)	2010–07–23
7	216	Mitchell Taylor	LHP	Spring High School (TX)	(United States)	2010–08–09
8	246	Logan Ehlers	LHP	Nebraska City High School (NE)	(United States)	Unsigned
9	276	Brandon Mims	2B	Newman Smith High School (TX)	(United States)	2010–08–09
10	306	Tyler Shreve	RHP	Phelps County High School (CA)	(United States)	Unsigned

- * The Blue Jays received the 34th pick as compensation for loss of free agent Marco Scutaro.
- * The Blue Jays received the 38th pick as compensation for failure to sign James Paxton.
- * The Blue Jays received the 41st pick as compensation for loss of free agent Rod Barajas.
- * The Blue Jays received the 69th pick as compensation for failure to sign Jake Eliopoulus.
- * The Blue Jays received the 81st pick as a compensation pick from the Boston Red Sox for signing type-A free agent Marco Scutaro.
- * The Blue Jays received the 114th pick as compensation for failure to sign Jake Barrett.

=== Roster ===
2010 Toronto Blue Jays
Roster
Pitchers: 49 Jeremy Accardo; 30 Taylor Buchholz; 57 Shawn Camp; 39 Jesse Carlson; 27 Brett Cecil; 37 Scott Downs; 4 Kyle Drabek; 30 Dana Eveland; 54 Jason Frasor; 63 Kevin Gregg; 31 Shawn Hill; 44 Casey Janssen; 50 Rommie Lewis; 51 Jesse Litsch; 28 Shaun Marcum; 59 Brad Mills; 23 Brandon Morrow; 25 David Purcey; 60 Robert Ray; 17 Josh Roenicke; 24 Ricky Romero; 34 Marc Rzepczynski; 56 Brian Tallet; 47 Merkin Valdez	Catchers: 9 J. P. Arencibia; 14 John Buck; 8 José Molina; Infielders: 12 Edwin Encarnación; 5 Yunel Escobar; 11 Álex González; 21 Nick Green; 2 Aaron Hill; 5,3 Jarrett Hoffpauir; 18 Mike McCoy; 6 John McDonald; 35 Lyle Overbay; 21 Randy Ruiz	Outfielders: 19 José Bautista; 15 Fred Lewis; 26 Adam Lind; 7 Jeremy Reed; 45 Travis Snider; 10 Vernon Wells; 1 DeWayne Wise	Manager: 43 Cito Gaston; Coaches: 55 Brian Butterfield (third base); 22 Rick Langford (bullpen); 16 Nick Leyva (bench); 52 Omar Malavé (first base); 41 Dwayne Murphy (hitting); 53 Bruce Walton (pitching)

== Broadcasts ==
As with previous seasons, Rogers Sportsnet serves as the official television broadcaster for the Blue Jays. Former catcher and manager Buck Martinez now serves as lead commentator for Sportsnet's broadcasts, replacing Jamie Campbell. Rogers Sportsnet will serve as the exclusive broadcaster for all Blue Jays games in the 2010 season, exchanging its rights to air ESPN's Sunday Night Baseball with TSN in order to acquire the rights to the Blue Jays games previously aired by TSN. Sunday Night Baseball would air on TSN2.

25 regular season games were moved to the newly launched Rogers Sportsnet One beginning in August 2010, which launched exclusively on Rogers Cable systems on August 14, 2010, a move which sparked criticism from viewers, fans, and critics. Of particular concern is the timing of the move considering the lack of the channel's availability across Canada, and the perceived strong-arming of Blue Jays fans and the other regional cable companies by Rogers, which owns the team, their stadium, the Sportsnet channels, and Rogers Cable, the only cable provider who carried the network upon its launch. Some fans cancelled Blue Jays ticket purchases in protest, but Paul Beeston, the team president, has stated he is very happy to be going with Sportsnet One.

The FAN 590 was the Jays flagship radio station with Jerry Howarth and Alan Ashby calling the games, and Mike Wilner was the third man in the booth at times, and the post-game host. The games were simulcast on other radio stations across the country.

== Season ==
=== Injuries ===
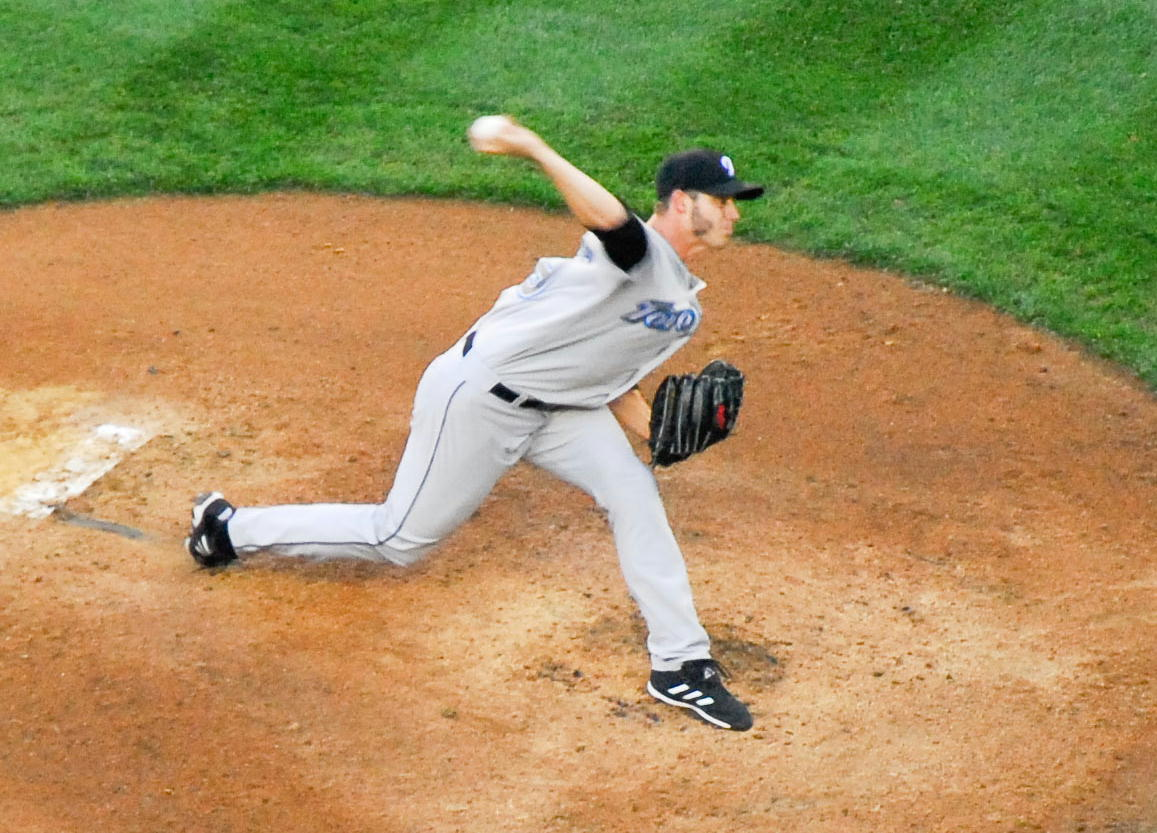
Dustin McGowan is among the pitchers hit with Tommy John surgery. He is expected to be back in May.

The Blue Jays suffered their first injury seconds into 2010, when a freak accident occurred. Third baseman Edwin Encarnación was celebrating New Years at his hometown in Dominican Republic when a fireworks malfunction caused fireworks to go out of control. Encarnación suffered minor facial injuries to the front and right side of his face after he was struck by a firecracker rocket near his jaw and it exploded. No serious damage was done, and Encarnación was ready to play by spring training. He suffered first and second-degree burns. The Jays still have other injury issues with their pitching staff. Their 3–4–5 pitchers in 2008 all underwent Tommy John surgery, and are all expected to be back for 2010. Jesse Litsch underwent Tommy John surgery in July 2009, and it is hoped he will return to the active roster in June 2010. Shaun Marcum also underwent Tommy John surgery after he went down late in 2008, and while a September 2009 return was possible, the Jays decided to sideline him for the rest of 2009. Marcum was the team's starter for Opening Day 2010, and will be the ace of the rotation. Dustin McGowan was the third Jay to have the same surgery, and he is not expected to be back in time for the start of 2010. A May return is a more realistic time for McGowan to return. On January 29, McGowan took a step forward as he threw off a mound, with no pain. Pitcher Dirk Hayhurst had arthroscopic shoulder surgery on February 5, and he will be out indefinitely. A couple of days before pitchers and catchers reported for training, Scott Richmond was sidetracked with a shoulder impingement, which can be a sign of tendinitis or an actual tear of the rotator cuff. Richmond was later placed on the 60-day DL. Jesse Litsch and Dirk Hayhurst were placed on the 60-day DL on the week that pitchers and catchers reported. The Jays suffered no major injuries during spring training except for Marc Rzepczynski, who suffered a broken finger on a bouncer that came back to the mound. Rzepczynski was placed on the 15-day DL along with Dustin McGowan, due to arm fatigue. The first injury during the season was a significant one, as All-Star second baseman Aaron Hill was placed on the 15-Day DL with a tight hamstring on April 12.

=== Expectations ===
As expected the Blue Jays are entering 2010 as re-builders, due to the loss of hitters (Barajas and Scutaro) to free agency, and the blockbuster trade of their long-time ace Roy Halladay for non-MLB ready prospects. Most fans and writers have called 2010 a rebuilding year, but a bright future is projected by Blue Jay writers and reporters. It was a different story at "State of the Franchise" press conference held at the Rogers Centre on January 28, 2010. Paul Beeston said "we're not in a rebuild mode. We're in build mode". Alex Anthopolous then discussed his interest in free agents Carlos Delgado and Johnny Damon. Cito Gaston said he wants Carlos Delgado back. Beeston said in a later interview that winning will bring fans into the stadium, and that is their goal.

=== Summary ===
==== Offseason ====
- See Offseason and Timeline for extended information about the 2009–2010 Toronto Blue Jays offseason.

Roberto Alomar's name as displayed in the Level of Excellence.

In the offseason, retired second baseman Roberto Alomar finished eight votes shy of being inducted into the Baseball Hall of Fame on his first ballot. Alomar announced earlier that if he did get inducted into the Hall of Fame, he would like to be inducted as a Blue Jay, becoming the first ever. Former Montreal Expos outfielder Andre Dawson was inducted into the Hall of Fame, and he was inducted as an Expo; the second Expo to be inducted into Cooperstown behind Gary Carter.

Alomar was inducted into the Canadian Baseball Hall of Fame on January 28, along with former Toronto pitcher Paul Quantrill and two others (Calvin Griffith and statistician Allan Roth). After hearing he would be inducted into the Canadian Baseball Hall of Fame, Alomar said, "This is an honor, truly a privilege. I cherished my years with the Blue Jays and have always loved the Canadian people. Those years were the very best of my career."

==== Spring training (March and April) ====
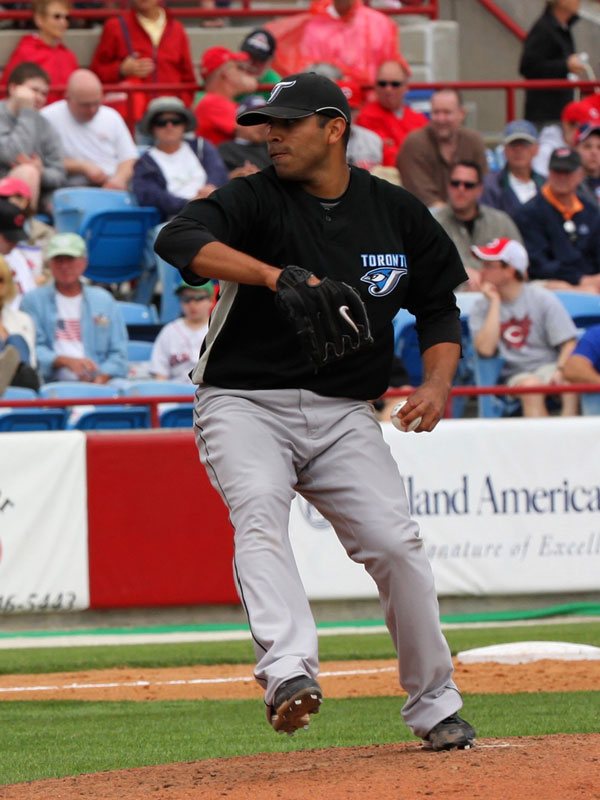
Ricky Romero pitching for the Jays during spring training.

Ricky Romero got the first start of 2010 in spring training for the Jays against the Detroit Tigers. Chris Lubanski, an offseason addition, hit the Jays only home run in that game when he hit a solo shot in the 8th. In total, 6 pitchers were sent out on day one, 5 of which were in their first spring training with the Jays. A day later, the Blue Jays got their first win, defeating Detroit 9–7. It was an interesting day as Kyle Drabek made his much anticipated debut for the Jays, and Halladay made his Debut with the Phillies. Halladay pitched 2 hitless innings, and Drabek pitched 2 innings giving up 2 runs on 3 hits. Drabek also struck out three. J. P. Arencibia hit a 2-run home run in the top of the 9th to break a 7–7 tie, and ultimately give the Jays a 9–7 win as Rommie Lewis closed the game out in the bottom of the ninth. The Jays played the Phillies a day later and beat them 14–9. The Jays once held a 14–2 lead at one point in that game. The Blue Jays won their third straight by smashing New York 9–1 at Legends Field. Shawn Marcum got the win in his first start with the Jays since 2008, and won their fourth straight over Detroit to improve their record to 4–1. Three of the four potential closers each pitched an inning giving up a combined 2 hits and 1 run with 2 strikeouts. Kevin Gregg gave up a home run to Gerald Laird in the 4th inning, and was the only one of three to not get a strikeout. On March 8, the Blue Jays cut their first three non-roster invites, two of them being catchers. Pitcher Daniel Farquhar was the first pitcher to be cut, and catchers Matt Luizza and Travis d'Arnaud (acquired in the Doc Deal) were among the catchers cut. All cuts will report to Minor League camp to be evaluated at which level each cut will start the year. A couple days later, Kyle Drabek was sent down to Minor League camp. He will start the year at AA New Hampshire or AAA Las Vegas.

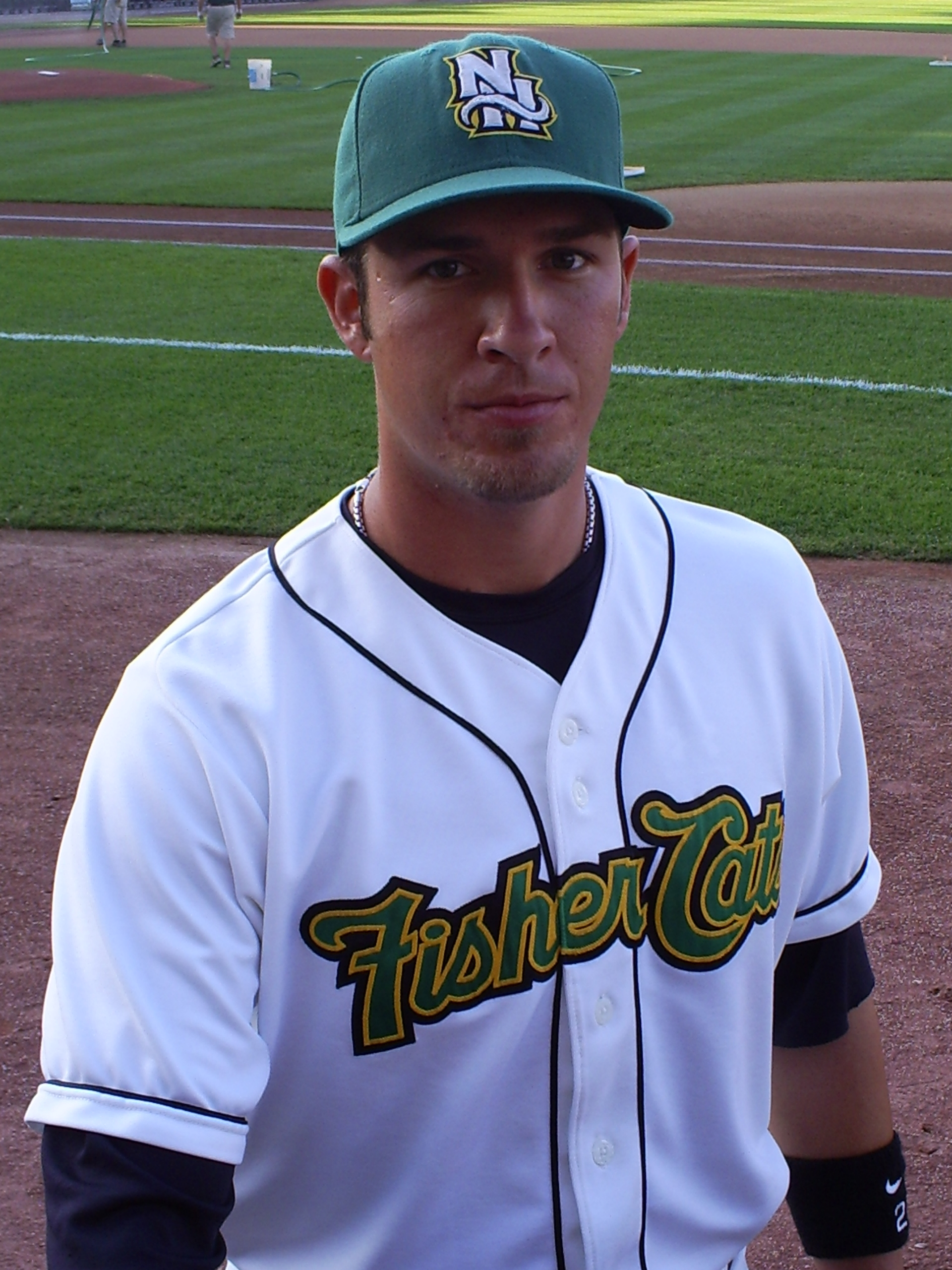
J. P. Arencibia had an impressive spring training, though it was not enough for him to earn a roster spot.

The Jays lost two straight after a 5–1 start, losing to the Phillies 4–2 and Rays 4–1. The next game, slated to be against the Astros, was canceled due to rain. The Jays got back to their winning ways on March 13, when Ricky Romero threw 4 shutout innings to guide the Jays to a 3–0 win over Atlanta. The Jays lost a day later to the Braves 8–5 with help from to prospect Jason Heyward, who hit two doubles. Randy Ruiz hit the Jays' only home run. The Jays did not rebound nicely as the first at-bat of their next game against Detroit was a home run from Scott Sizemore. The Jays held a one-run lead going into the eighth, but collapsed and gave up 4 runs. The Jays rebounded after that by beating Baltimore in back-to-back days. The Jays won 4–1 on March 17 thanks to Travis Snider's first home run and Brian Tallet's second win. The Jays then pounded the Orioles 13–3 the next day on the strength of 6 home runs. Travis Snider and John Buck both hit two, and Aaron Hill and Chris Lubanski hit one. Ricky Romero got his team-leading third win. The Blue Jays also made some cuts on the 18th. Pitcher Zech Zinicola (acquired by the Jays in the Rule-5 draft) did not make the cut, and he was returned to Washington. Hitter Brian Dopirak also didn't make the cut, but he will stay in the Jays organization. The Jays split their next two games before another game got canceled due to rain. Toronto lost to Houston 2–0, and beat Atlanta 7–6. The Jays were going to play the Red Sox for the first time in spring training, but rain in Dunedin forced the game to be canceled. From there, the Blue Jays fell into a spring training freefall, losing five in a row. The Jays lost as a split squad twice on March 26, including a disappointing loss to the Boston Red Sox. The Jays took a 2–0 lead into the 9th when Zach Jackson came in to close the game out. The Sox rallied for 3 runs, and walked off. The Jays' other loss was a 14–10 loss to the Rays. The slump caused the Jays to fall below .500, and they could not rebound. The Jays beat Pittsburgh 11–2 to snap the five-game slide. The next day, The Jays blew a 2–0 lead late against the Tigers to earn their first tie of two in spring training. But on March 31, by far the most interesting match up in spring came against the Phillies. Sandwiched between 2 losses to the Yankees was a start by Roy Halladay. "Doc" struggled, as he gave up 4 earned runs on five hits in 3 innings. All 4 runs were surrendered in the first inning. Four hits were extra base hits, including a 2-run shot by Aaron Hill. The Jays then entered Houston to finish up spring training. In Buck Martinez's play-by-play debut, Aaron Hill hit a two-run shot in the first inning to help jumpstart the Jays. The Jays failed to hold on to a 3–0 lead and surrendered a game-tying run in the 9th inning to tie the game at 3. The Jays rebounded by hitting the Astros hard and early. Aaron Hill hit his second straight first inning shot to jumpstart the Jays again, and Edwin Encarnación ended a disappointing spring with a 3-run home run. The Jays ended up winning 13–6. Their final spring training record was 12–13–2. Alex Anthopolous called it "a great spring" in an in-game interview with Rod Black and Pat Tabler.

==== April ====
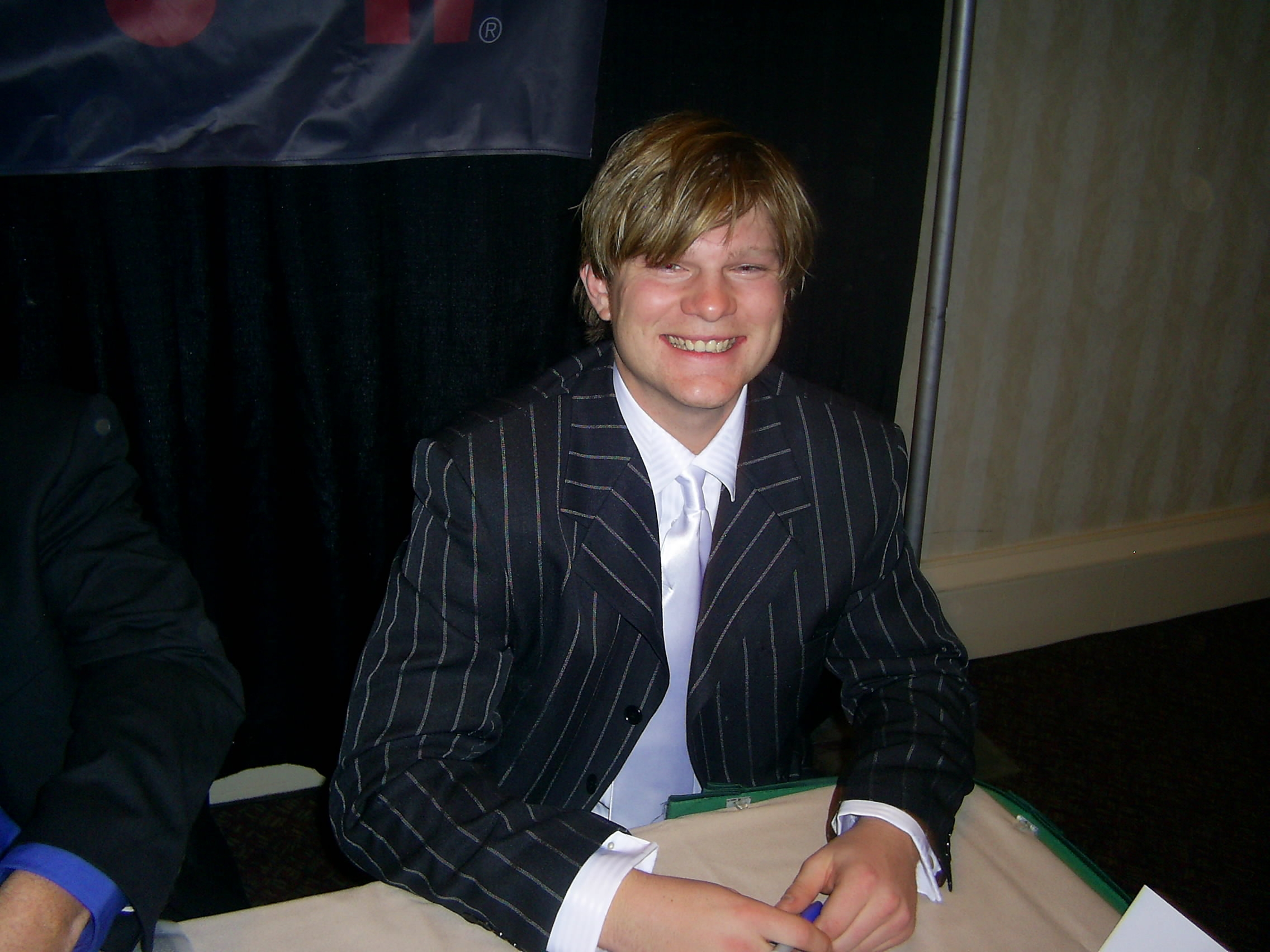
Adam Lind signed a four-year contract extension through 2013 with three club options that could go through 2016.

On March 22, Shaun Marcum was named the opening-day starter for the Toronto Blue Jays. This was Marcum's first opening day start of his career. Brian Tallet was later named the Day 2 starter, ahead of Ricky Romero. Tallet is the probable home opener starter. On April 3, Adam Lind signed a long-term contract with the Jays that could keep him with the club until 2016. Lind signed a four-year deal that will keep him in Toronto until at least 2013, with three club option years that could keep him in Toronto until the end of the 2016 season. On April 12, Aaron Hill was placed on the DL with a tight hamstring.

Toronto kicked off their 2010 regular season in Arlington, Texas, against the Texas Rangers. (See below for opening day results). The Blue Jays lost 5–4. The Blue Jays rebounded, and won 7–4 the next day. Vernon Wells continued his good start by homering twice, while Toronto starter Brian Tallet pitched a quality game and earned a win. The next day, Toronto was dealt a scare, as All-Star second baseman Aaron Hill was a late scratch due to a hamstring injury. The injury was said to be minor. Mike McCoy started at second base in place of Aaron Hill for his first career MLB start. McCoy earned his first career hit in his first at-bat of the game. McCoy finished the game 2-for-5 with an RBI. Ricky Romero and C. J. Wilson held the game scoreless until the 7th when Ricky Romero threw a wild pitch to allow David Murphy to score and give the Rangers a 1–0 lead. Texas held on to that lead until the 9th inning when Frank Francisco came in to close the game. Vernon Wells hit a solo shot to jumpstart the Jays to a 3-run inning that would ultimately give the Jays a 3–1 win. Jason Frasor made his second straight save. The win marked the first time the Jays passed the .500 mark since July 7, 2009, when they were 43–42. The Jays then flew to Baltimore to play as visitor for the O's home opener. In front of 48,891 fans, the Jays quickly jumped out to a 3–0 lead, as Vernon Wells hit another RBI. Brandon Morrow had issues in the bottom of the first, as a lack of control helped the O's get back to tie the game at 3 on the strength of one hit. Toronto got back ahead before Miguel Tejada hit a 2-run shot in the 5th to tie the game again. Baltimore would then pull ahead in the 8th thanks to a César Izturis RBI with 2 outs. Mike Gonzalez entered the game to close it out, but like Thursday, Toronto rallied in the 9th for 2 runs to pull ahead for good. Kevin Gregg earned his first save with the Jays. Dana Eveland made his first start for the Jays in the 5th game, and earned a quality start. Eveland gave up 5 hits on 7.1 innings of work, and the offense scored 3 thanks to 2 RBIs from José Molina. Travis Snider was intentionally walked twice to bring up Molina. With the bases loaded, Molina was hit by a pitch to bring in a run. Molina also hit a RBI single after another Snider IBB. Jason Frasor earned his first save. The win gave the Jays sole possession of first place in the AL East for the first time since May 23, 2009. The Jays continued their hot start by winning their 5th straight. Baltimore took a 2–1 lead into the 8th. After Kevin Millwood retired the first two, John McDonald reached first thanks to a Miguel Tejada error. That error allowed José Bautista to hit a 2-run home run to give the Jays the lead. the Jays added insurance thanks to an Álex González solo shot (his second of the day), and Edwin Encarnación's first home run of 2010. Jason Frasor earned his fourth save. The Jays have started the season 5–1 for the past 2 seasons. The Jays then started their first homestand of 2010 on April 12 (see below for home opener results). Ricky Romero then pitched a gem in game 8, going 8 innings giving up 2 runs on 1 hit. The Jays took a 4–0 lead, and that was all they needed thanks to Romero. Romero struck out 12 and took a no-hitter into the 8th before A. J. Pierzynski was hit on a questionable call, and Alex Ríos ended the no-hit bid with a 2-run home run. Kevin Gregg earned to save to seal it. A day later the Jays were shut down, as they were only able to manage one run on two hits. The Sox put the Jays to sleep fast, thanks to 11 runs, 4 of which came from an Andruw Jones grand slam. Only 10,610 fans were there to witness that game, an all-time low for Jays games at Rogers Centre. Low opening-week attendance drew comments (unknown whether it was a joke or if they were serious) from Alex Ríos and Ozzie Guillén claimed that "Baseball is dead in Toronto", and that hockey is the reason nobody cares about baseball in Toronto. Ozzie Guillén claimed that if hockey players were on the field, people would come. Ríos then blamed hockey for lack of interest in baseball, even though no professional hockey team from Toronto was playing during the opening series. Ríos went on to say only diehards support the Blue Jays. Ozzie Guillén did not understand why Ríos was booed by Jays fans. After watching a viral video uploaded two months before Ríos was released (when Ríos was leaving a charity event after a game in which he struck out 5 times in a 1-run loss, a kid asked for autographs, and Ríos declined it. Another fan told Ríos "The way you played today, you should be lucky someone wants your autograph". Ríos constantly replied "Who gives a fuck?" as the fan called Ríos a bum.) Ozzie Guillén said "I would beat the shit out of him and the guys." The writer of that article (Joe Cowley), was also causing controversy for comments made about Canadian culture and the Jays organization. He claimed that "Baseball is failing in Toronto", and that MLB should be concerned with moving a team out of Canada. In the middle of this he claimed that all that was on TV in his hotel room was hockey, Olympics, and MuchMusic videos. He suggested that Toronto should move to Caracas, Venezuela. In the end, the organization will not be moved out of Canada any time soon, as Paul Beeston said. But Toronto continued their homestand as they started a three-game set against the Angels. Toronto lost back-to-back games to LA to start the series. Their record dropped to 7–5.

===== Opening Day =====
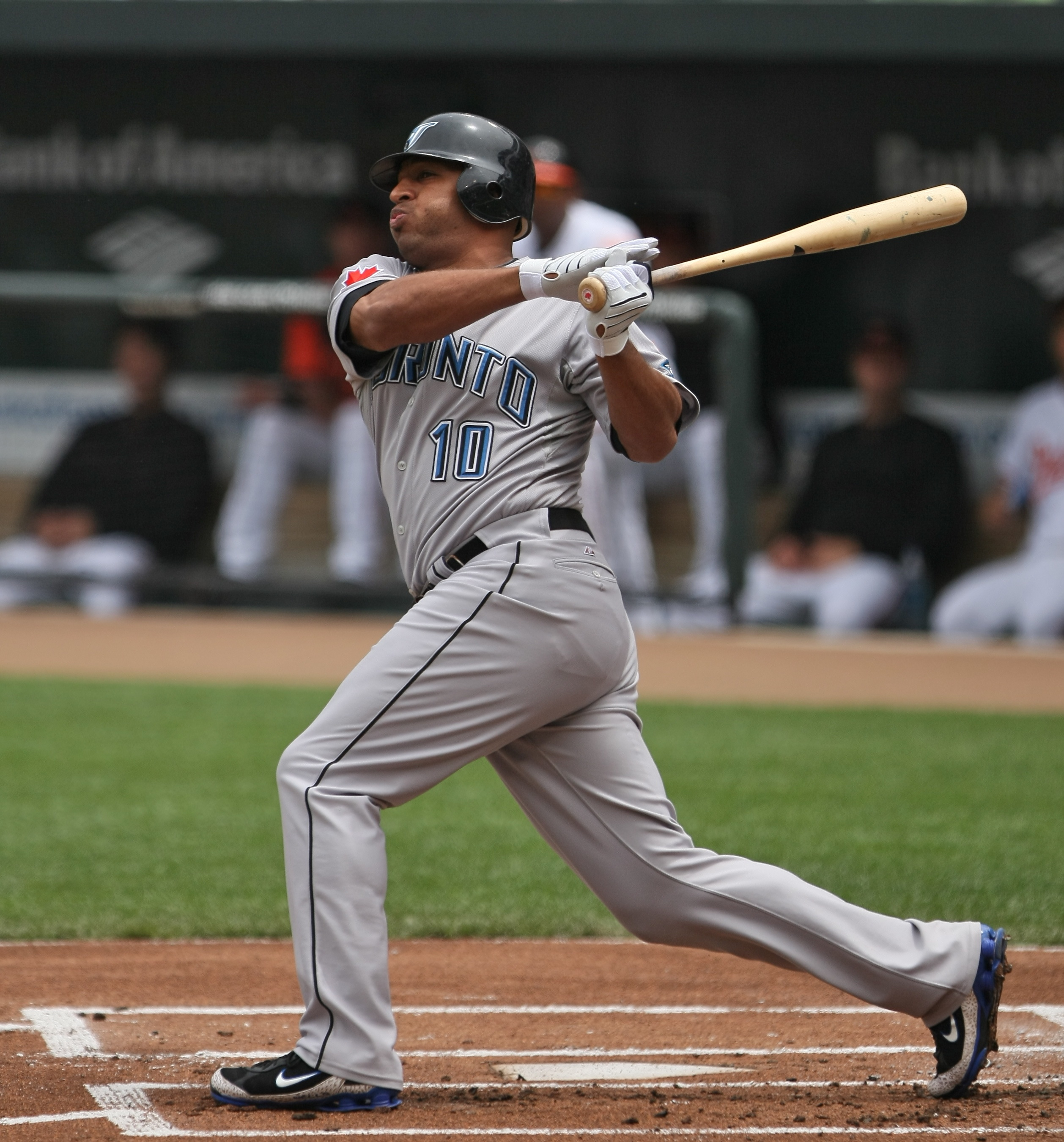
Vernon Wells hit the Jays first home run of 2010.

Venue: Rangers Ballpark in Arlington Attendance: 50,299

Team	1	2	3	4	5	6	7	8	9	R	H	E
Toronto Blue Jays	2	0	1	0	0	0	0	1	0	4	7	1
Texas Rangers	0	0	0	0	0	0	3	0	2	5	6	1
WP: Frank Francisco (1–0) LP: Jason Frasor (0–1); Home runs: Away: Vernon Wells (1), Adam Lind (1); Home: Nelson Cruz (1)

On April 5, the Blue Jays opened the 2010 season in Arlington, Texas against the Texas Rangers. A first-inning Vernon Wells home run spotted starter Shaun Marcum – making his first start since September 16, 2008 – to a 2–0 lead. Adam Lind pushed the lead to 3–0 with a solo home run in the third. Marcum took a no-hitter into the seventh inning, but after a Josh Hamilton walk, Vladimir Guerrero broke the no-hitter with a single. The next batter, Nelson Cruz, hit an opposite-field three-run home run to tie the game. In the eighth, Wells hit a bases-loaded single to left-center to give the Jays a 4–3 lead. The Jays took the lead into the ninth inning, but closer Jason Frasor failed to convert the save opportunity. Michael Young led the inning off with a double, followed by a Guerrero infield single with one out and a game-tying RBI double from Nelson Cruz. Chris Davis was given an intentional walk to load the bases for Jarrod Saltalamacchia. Saltalamacchia hit a gapper to right-center that allowed pinch runner David Murphy to score the winning run.

===== Starting lineup =====
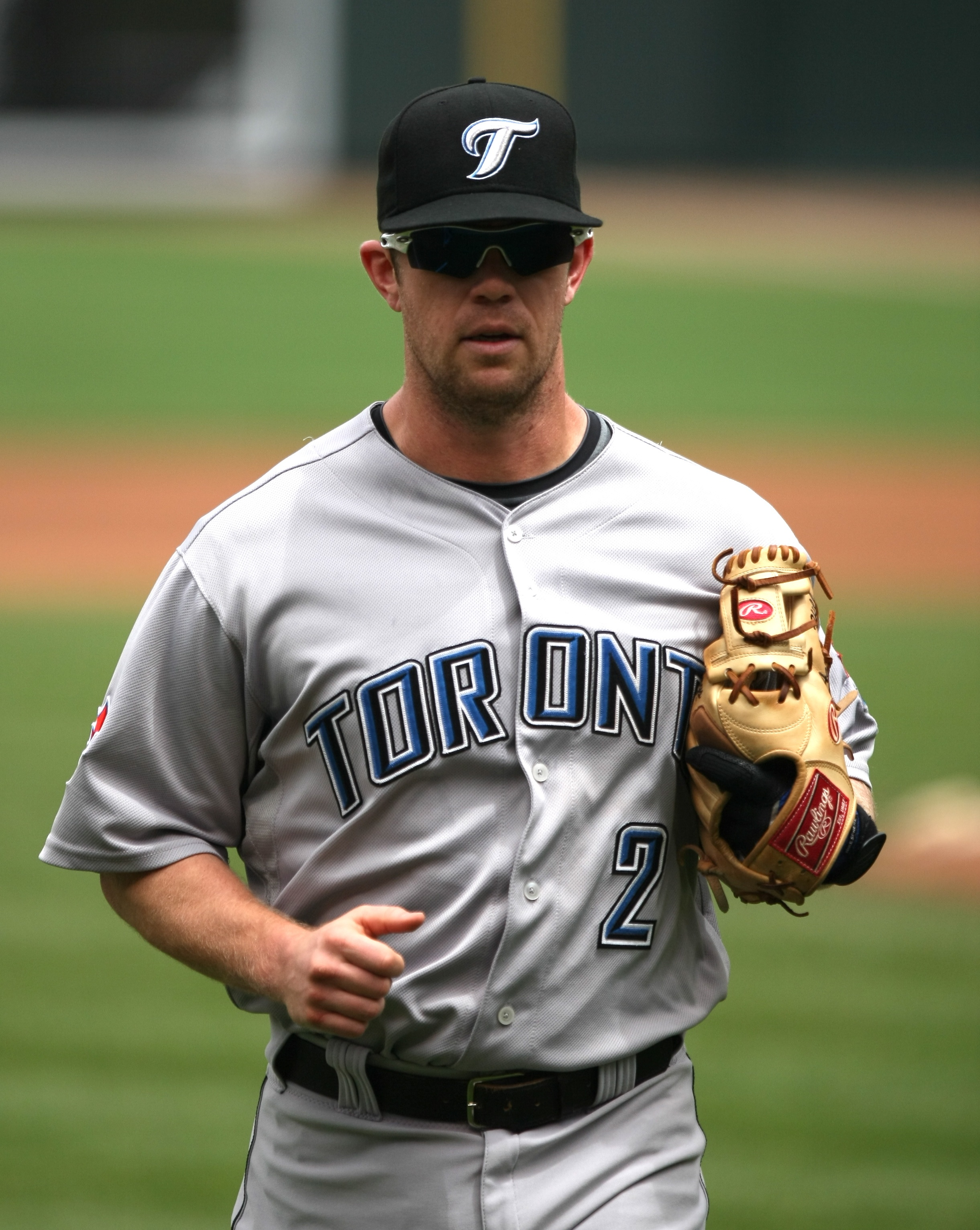
Aaron Hill started at second base for the 5th straight season.

Only five Blue Jays from 2009 were starting at the same position in 2010, and only three are in the same batting position in 2009. The most notable change is Shawn Marcum taking the mound as Opening Day starting pitcher instead of Roy Halladay. The last time Halladay did not start on Opening Day was in 2002 when Chris Carpenter started.

Position	2009 starter batting pos.	2010 starter batting pos.
Catcher	Rod Barajas 8	John Buck 6
First baseman	Lyle Overbay 7	Lyle Overbay 5
Second baseman	Aaron Hill 2	Aaron Hill 2
Third baseman	Scott Rolen 6	Edwin Encarnación 7
Shortstop	Marco Scutaro 1	Álex González 8
Left field	Travis Snider 9	Travis Snider 9
Center field	Vernon Wells 4	Vernon Wells 4
Right field	Alex Ríos 3	José Bautista 1
Designated hitter	Adam Lind 5	Adam Lind 3
Starting pitcher	Roy Halladay	Shaun Marcum
Closer	B. J. Ryan	Jason Frasor

===== Home opener =====
Honda Canada was named the official vehicle of the Toronto Blue Jays in March. As a part of the sponsorship, Honda has been named the official sponsor of the 2010 home opener. It has officially been named Honda Home Opener.

Venue: Rogers Centre Attendance: 46,321

Team	1	2	3	4	5	6	7	8	9	10	11	R	H	E
Chicago White Sox	0	2	2	0	0	2	0	0	1	0	1	8	14	0
Toronto Blue Jays	0	2	4	0	0	1	0	0	0	0	0	7	8	1
WP: Matt Thornton (1–0) LP: Jeremy Accardo (0–1) Sv: Bobby Jenks (2); Home runs: Away: Andruw Jones (1,2), Mark Teahen (1); Home: John Buck (1), Vernon Wells (5)

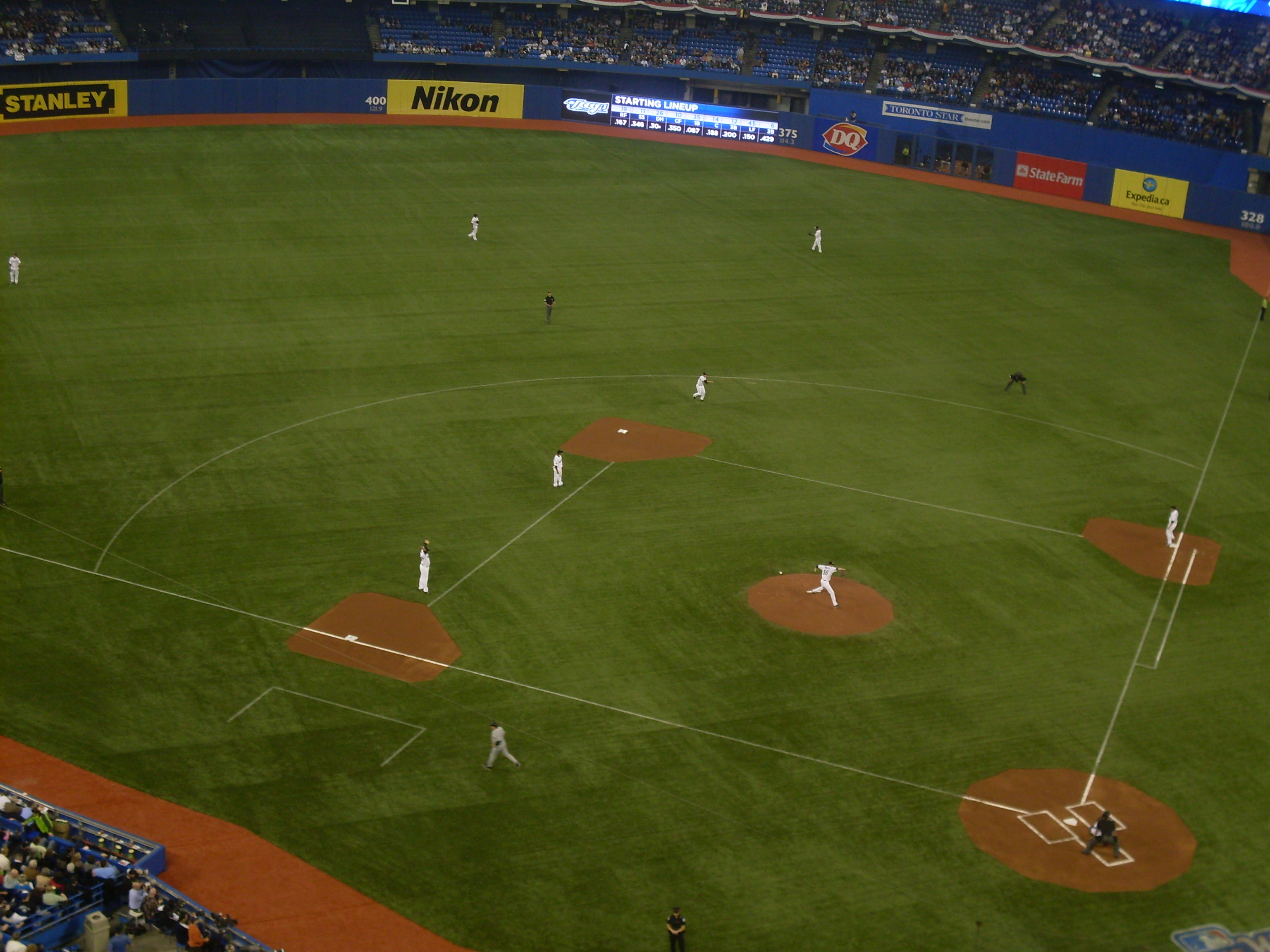
The Jays' starting lineup for their home opener

The Jays entered their 2010 home opener on a five-game win streak, and had won four straight home openers. The Jays fell below 2–0 early, but came back thanks to a mammoth 2-run shot by John Buck that landed in the 400 level (over the ring of honour). The Jays then fell back by 2 runs again in the third inning, but responded in the bottom of the third with a 2-run shot by Vernon Wells and a 2-RBI hit by Adam Lind. Chicago came back to tie the game, thanks to a solo shot by Andruw Jones and an RBI single by Mark Teahen that scored Alex Ríos. Ríos was playing in Toronto for the first time since being placed on waivers in July 2009. Ríos was welcomed back with a chorus of "boos". Ríos was booed for every at-bat, and every time he fielded a ball. The Jays climbed back on top in the bottom of the inning when Adam Lind was walked on 4 pitches with the bases loaded to give the Jays the lead again. Toronto held on to that lead, but it quickly vanished in the ninth. Jason Frasor blew another save, as he gave up a home run to Mark Teahen on an 0–2 pitch. The game stayed tied until the 11th when Teahen struck again this time with an RBI triple that scored pinch runner Omar Vizquel from first base. The Jays nearly walked off the next inning, but a long line drive by Álex González with one on missed the foul pole by about 5 feet. Gonzalez drew a walk, but the next batter Adam Lind struck out for the third time to end the game. The Jays had their five-game win streak snapped, their streak of four straight win for their home openers was snapped too, and their ten-game winning streak against the White Sox at home was also snapped, dating back to 2007. The loss put the Jays' record to 5–2. Both losses were aided with a blown save by Jason Frasor. Kevin Gregg would assume the full-time role as closer a day later.

==== June ====
The Blue Jays' last interleague series was to be a home set against the Philadelphia Phillies. However, on May 12, the Blue Jays announced the series would be moved to Philadelphia's Citizens Bank Park due to logistical and security concerns brought about by the G20 Summit. Rogers Centre is next door to the Metro Toronto Convention Centre, where the summit took place. Fans would have faced numerous problems with parking and access, along with a number of unknown obstacles. Nonetheless, the Blue Jays were the home team for that series.

==== July ====
On July 30 José Bautista hit a grand slam home run against the Cleveland Indians at Rogers Centre.

==== August ====
- On August 7, the Blue Jays played the Tampa Bay Rays. This was catching prospect J. P. Arencibia's first major league game. He was called up from Triple-A Las Vegas after John Buck suffered a lacerated finger caused by a foul ball. On the first pitch he saw, Arencibia hit a two-run home run off of Rays pitcher James Shields. He also hit a single, a double, and another home run later in the game, finishing only a triple shy of the cycle. Arencibia became the 28th player in history to hit a home run on his first pitch, the fifth player in history to hit two home runs in his first game, and the first player in the modern era to have four hits and two home runs in his first game. He is also the only Blue Jay to ever have four hits in his major league debut.
- On August 8, the Blue Jays again played the Tampa Bay Rays. Brandon Morrow took a no-hitter into the ninth inning and, with two out in the ninth, a softly hit ground ball by Evan Longoria bounced off of a diving Aaron Hill's glove and into the outfield. This was scored a hit. Though he did not throw a no-hitter, Morrow struck out 17 batters in the game, the second most in Blue Jays history (Roger Clemens – 18). Morrow also became the only Blue Jays pitcher other than Clemens to strikeout 15 or more batters in a game.
- On August 23, the Blue Jays played the New York Yankees. José Bautista hit is 39th and 40th home run of the game to become the first Blue Jay since 2003 to hit 40 home runs in a season. In the same game, Brandon Morrow struck out another 12 batters in under 7 innings of work to raise is K/9 average to 11.0, putting him on pace to have the highest single season K/9 average in Blue Jays history.
- On August 31, the Blue Jays played the Tampa Bay Rays. José Bautista hit his 43rd home run of the season. This pushed him over the 100 RBI mark. This is the first time since 2003 that a Blue Jay player has gotten to 100 plus RBI before September (Vernon Wells and Carlos Delgado).

==== September ====
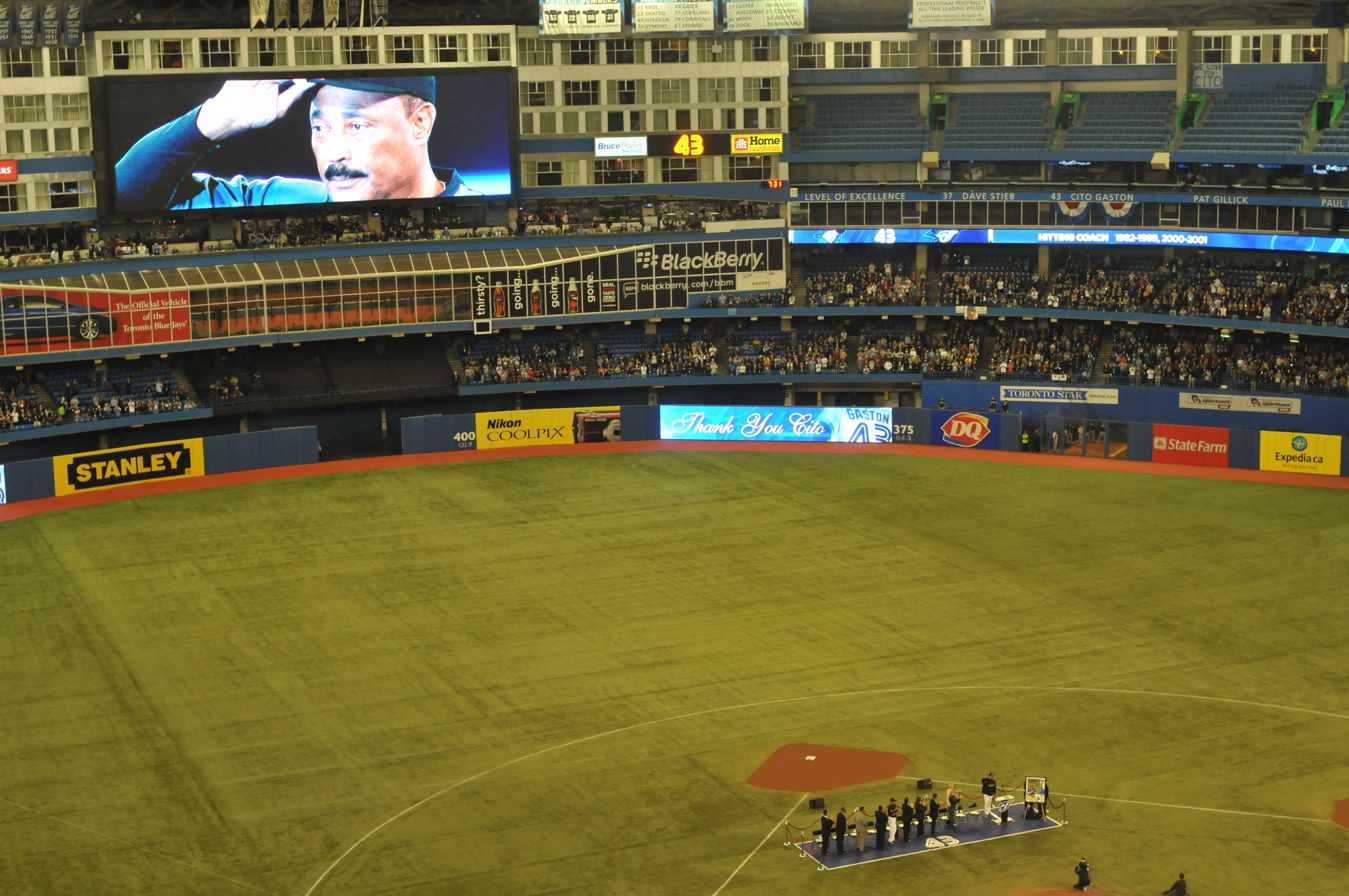
On the last home game of the season, a ceremony was held for manager Cito Gaston, who would retire at the end of the season.

- On September 15, José Bautista hit his 47th home run of the season against Brad Bergesen of the Baltimore Orioles. This tied him with George Bell for the franchise record in home runs in a single season.
- On September 17, José Bautista hit his 48th home run of the season against Michael Bowden of the Boston Red Sox. This made him the single-season home runs record holder for the Blue Jays.
- On September 19, the Blue Jays were eliminated from playoff contention after a loss to the Red Sox.
- On September 29, Travis Snider hit the Blue Jays' 245th home run of the season against Javier Vázquez of the New York Yankees, breaking the franchise record for home runs in a season, set in 2000.

=== Standings ===
==== Spring training (Grapefruit League) ====
Grapefruit League	W	L	Pct.	GB
Tampa Bay Rays	20	8	.714	—
Detroit Tigers	18	12	.600	3
Atlanta Braves	17	12	.586	3 1/2
Philadelphia Phillies	15	12	.556	4 1/2
Boston Red Sox	17	14	.548	4 1/2
Minnesota Twins	16	14	.533	5
St. Louis Cardinals	15	14	.517	5 1/2
Florida Marlins	14	14	.500	6
Toronto Blue Jays	12	13	.480	6 1/2
New York Mets	14	16	.467	7
Houston Astros	13	15	.464	7
New York Yankees	13	15	.464	7
Baltimore Orioles	12	17	.414	8 1/2
Washington Nationals	10	20	.333	11
Pittsburgh Pirates	7	21	.250	13

==== Regular season ====
===== AL East =====
AL East
Team	W	L	Pct.	GB	Home	Road
Tampa Bay Rays	96	66	.593	—	49‍–‍32	47‍–‍34
New York Yankees	95	67	.586	1	52‍–‍29	43‍–‍38
Boston Red Sox	89	73	.549	7	46‍–‍35	43‍–‍38
Toronto Blue Jays	85	77	.525	11	45‍–‍33	40‍–‍44
Baltimore Orioles	66	96	.407	30	37‍–‍44	29‍–‍52

== Game log ==
=== Regular season ===
The 2010 MLB and Toronto Blue Jays schedule was announced on September 15, 2009. It includes 162 games (as usual) – 81 at home, 81 on the road. The Jays open and close on the road, started off in Arlington and lost to Rangers on Easter Monday, and will close it out with a four-game set in the brand new Target Field against the Twins. The Jays home opener opponent was the Chicago White Sox on a Monday night at 7:20 pm (past home openers have started at 7:15 pm), and lost 8–7 in 11 innings. The Jay's final home game of 2010 will be held on September 29 against the New York Yankees.

Legend
Blue Jays win	Blue Jays loss	Home game	Road game	Game postponed

2010 game log
April 12–12 (home 6–9, road 6–3, 24/24 GP)
#	Date	Opponent	Score	Win	Loss	Save	Attendance	Record	GB
1	April 5	@ Rangers	4–5	Francisco (1–0)	Frasor (0–1)		50,299	0–1	1
2	April 7	@ Rangers	7–4	Tallet (1–0)	Nippert (0–1)	Frasor (1)	22,890	1–1	1
3	April 8	@ Rangers	3–1	Janssen (1–0)	Francisco (1–1)	Frasor (2)	14,707	2–1	—
4	April 9	@ Orioles	7–6	Janssen (2–0)	Gonzalez (0–2)	Gregg (1)	48,891	3–1	—
5	April 10	@ Orioles	3–0	Eveland (1–0)	Hernandez (0–1)	Frasor (3)	21,148	4–1	+1
6	April 11	@ Orioles	5–2	Janssen (3–0)	Millwood (0–1)	Gregg (2)	22,499	5–1	+1
7	April 12	White Sox	7–8 (11)	Thornton (1–0)	Accardo (0–1)	Jenks (2)	46,321	5–2	+½
8	April 13	White Sox	4–2	Romero (1–0)	Floyd (0–1)	Gregg (3)	12,167	6–2	+½
9	April 14	White Sox	1–11	Danks (1–0)	Morrow (0–1)		10,610	6–3	—
10	April 15	White Sox	7–3	Eveland (2–0)	F. García (0–2)		10,744	7–3	+½
11	April 16	Angels	5–7	Weaver (2–0)	Marcum (0–1)	Rodney (2)	14,779	7–4	½
12	April 17	Angels	3–6	Saunders (1–2)	Tallet (1–1)	Rodney (3)	17,187	7–5	1 1/2
13	April 18	Angels	1–3	Santana (1–2)	Romero (1–1)		14,246	7–6	2 1/2
14	April 19	Royals	8–1	Morrow (1–1)	Bannister (0–1)		10,314	8–6	2 1/2
15	April 20	Royals	4–3	Camp (1–0)	Davies (0–2)	Gregg (4)	10,565	9–6	2
16	April 21	Royals	3–4 (10)	Tejeda (1–1)	Downs (0–1)	Soria (4)	15,577	9–7	3
17	April 23	@ Rays	6–5	Cecil (1–0)	Garza (3–1)	Gregg (5)	22,056	10–7	2
18	April 24	@ Rays	3–9	Wheeler (1–0)	Downs (0–2)		23,870	10–8	3
19	April 25	@ Rays	0–6	Price (3–1)	Morrow (1–2)		23,250	10–9	4
20	April 26	Red Sox	12–13	Schoeneweis (1–0)	Camp (1–1)	Papelbon (6)	13,847	10–10	4 1/2
21	April 27	Red Sox	1–2	Buchholz (2–2)	Downs (0–3)	Ramírez (1)	14,776	10–11	5 1/2
22	April 28	Red Sox	0–2	Lester (1–2)	Cecil (1–1)	Papelbon (7)	15,276	10–12	6 1/2
23	April 29	Athletics	6–3	Romero (2–1)	Duchscherer (2–1)	Gregg (6)	10,721	11–12	6 1/2
24	April 30	Athletics	10–2	Morrow (2–2)	Cahill (0–1)		12,722	12–12	5 1/2
May 19–10 (home 9–2, road 10–8, 29/29 GP)
#	Date	Opponent	Score	Win	Loss	Save	Attendance	Record	GB
25	May 1	Athletics	3–4	Gonzalez (3–1)	Eveland (2–1)	Bailey (3)	13,951	12–13	5 1/2
26	May 2	Athletics	9–3	Marcum (1–1)	Sheets (1–3)		14,725	13–13	5 1/2
27	May 3	@ Indians	5–1	Cecil (2–1)	Talbot (3–2)		10,117	14–13	5
28	May 4	@ Indians	8–5	Romero (3–1)	Lewis (2–1)	Gregg (7)	10,387	15–13	5
29	May 5	@ Indians	5–4	Frasor (1–1)	Perez (0–2)		12,563	16–13	5
30	May 6	@ White Sox	2–0	Eveland (3–1)	Danks (3–1)	Gregg (8)	20,106	17–13	5
31	May 7	@ White Sox	7–4 (12)	Downs (1–3)	Putz (0–2)		20,072	18–13	5
32	May 8	@ White Sox	3–7	Peavy (2–2)	Cecil (2–2)		24,945	18–14	5
33	May 9	@ White Sox	9–7	Frasor (2–1)	Jenks (1–1)	Gregg (9)	23,850	19–14	4
34	May 10	@ Red Sox	6–7	Lackey (4–1)	Morrow (2–3)	Papelbon (9)	37,332	19–15	4
35	May 11	@ Red Sox	1–6	Matsuzaka (2–1)	Eveland (3–2)		37,609	19–16	5
36	May 12	@ Red Sox	3–2	Marcum (2–1)	Wakefield (0–2)	Gregg (10)	37,198	20–16	5
37	May 14	Rangers	16–10	Roenicke (1–0)	Mathis (1–1)		16,020	21–16	4
38	May 15	Rangers	6–0	Romero (4–1)	Feldman (1–4)		15,945	22–16	3 1/2
39	May 16	Rangers	5–2	Morrow (3–3)	Lewis (3–2)	Gregg (11)	25,518	23–16	4
40	May 17	Twins	3–8	Slowey (5–3)	Eveland (3–3)		13,892	23–17	5
41	May 18	Twins	11–2	Marcum (3–1)	Pavano (4–4)		27,981	24–17	4 1/2
42	May 19	@ Mariners	3–2	Cecil (3–2)	Fister (3–2)	Gregg (12)	19,208	25–17	5
43	May 20	@ Mariners	3–4	Kelley (2–0)	Gregg (0–1)		20,452	25–18	6
44	May 21	@ Diamondbacks	6–8	Haren (5–3)	Morrow (3–4)	Qualls (8)	19,531	25–19	6
45	May 22	@ Diamondbacks	5–8	Jackson (3–5)	Eveland (3–4)	Qualls (9)	32,746	25–20	7
46	May 23	@ Diamondbacks	12–4	Marcum (4–1)	Buckner (0–2)		23,148	26–20	7
47	May 24	@ Angels	6–0	Cecil (4–2)	Saunders (3–6)		35,826	27–20	6
48	May 25	@ Angels	3–8	Santana (4–3)	Romero (4–2)		43,174	27–21	6
49	May 26	@ Angels	5–6	Fuentes (2–1)	Downs (1–4)		34,504	27–22	6
50	May 28	Orioles	5–0	Marcum (5–1)	Millwood (0–5)		16,360	28–22	5 1/2
51	May 29	Orioles	5–2	Cecil (5–2)	Berken (0–1)	Gregg (13)	16,194	29–22	5 1/2
52	May 30	Orioles	6–1	Romero (5–2)	Guthrie (3–5)		15,878	30–22	4 1/2
53	May 31	Rays	3–2	Morrow (4–4)	Garza (5–4)	Gregg (14)	11,335	31–22	3 1/2
June 9–17 (home 6–8, road 3–9, 26/26 GP)
#	Date	Opponent	Score	Win	Loss	Save	Attendance	Record	GB
54	June 1	Rays	6–7	Balfour (1–1)	Gregg (0–2)	Soriano (15)	13,439	31–23	4 1/2
55	June 2	Rays	3–7	Price (8–2)	Marcum (5–2)		13,517	31–24	5 1/2
56	June 4	Yankees	6–1	Cecil (6–2)	Burnett (6–3)		30,089	32–24	4 1/2
57	June 5	Yankees	3–2 (14)	Janssen (4–0)	Gaudin (0–3)		37,165	33–24	3 1/2
58	June 6	Yankees	3–4	Vázquez (5–5)	Downs (1–5)	Rivera (13)	33,622	33–25	4 1/2
59	June 8	@ Rays	0–9	Niemann (6–0)	Tallet (1–2)		12,937	33–26	5 1/2
60	June 9	@ Rays	1–10	Price (9–2)	Marcum (5–3)		15,886	33–27	6 1/2
61	June 10	@ Rays	3–2	Cecil (7–2)	Davis (5–6)	Gregg (15)	13,675	34–27	5 1/2
62	June 11	@ Rockies	3–5 (6)	Jiménez (12–1)	Romero (5–3)		31,101	34–28	5 1/2
63	June 12	@ Rockies	0–1	Hammel (4–3)	Morrow (4–5)	Corpas (8)	26,304	34–29	6 1/2
64	June 13	@ Rockies	3–10	Francis (2–2)	Litsch (0–1)		32,084	34–30	6 1/2
65	June 14	@ Padres	6–3	Marcum (6–3)	Garland (6–5)	Gregg (16)	16,542	35–30	6
66	June 15	@ Padres	2–8	Latos (7–4)	Cecil (7–3)		15,266	35–31	7
67	June 16	@ Padres	7–1	Romero (6–3)	Correia (5–5)		16,050	36–31	6
68	June 18	Giants	3–2	Downs (2–5)	Zito (7–3)	Gregg (17)	18,667	37–31	4 1/2
69	June 19	Giants	3–0	Camp (2–1)	Cain (6–5)	Gregg (18)	20,666	38–31	4 1/2
70	June 20	Giants	6–9	D. Bautista (1–0)	Tallet (1–3)	Wilson (19)	21,431	38–32	5 1/2
71	June 22	Cardinals	4–9	J. García (7–0)	Cecil (7–4)		16,830	38–33	6
72	June 23	Cardinals	0–1	Carpenter (9–1)	Gregg (0–3)	Franklin (14)	14,079	38–34	7
73	June 24	Cardinals	5–0	Morrow (5–5)	Wainwright (10–5)		12,392	39–34	6 1/2
74	June 25	Phillies (Note: Toronto "home" game relocated to Citizens Bank Park in Philadelphia due to the 2010 G-20 Toronto summit.)	9–0	Halladay (9–6)	Litsch (0–2)		43,076	39–35	7 1/2
75	June 26	Phillies	5–1	Marcum (7–3)	Hamels (6–6)		44,426	40–35	6 1/2
76	June 27	Phillies	2–11	Moyer (9–6)	Cecil (7–5)		42,571	40–36	7 1/2
77	June 28	@ Indians	1–2	Westbrook (5–4)	Romero (6–4)	Wood (7)	11,577	40–37	8
78	June 29	@ Indians	4–5	Carmona (7–6)	Morrow (5–6)	Wood (8)	11,401	40–38	8
79	June 30	@ Indians	1–3	Laffey (1–2)	Litsch (0–3)	Perez (7)	12,109	40–39	8
July 14–11 (home 7–4, road 7–7, 25/25 GP)
#	Date	Opponent	Score	Win	Loss	Save	Attendance	Record	GB
80	July 1	@ Indians	1–6	Masterson (3–7)	Marcum (7–4)	Herrmann (1)	16,859	40–40	9
81	July 2	@ Yankees	6–1 (11)	Frasor (3–1)	Robertson (0–3)		45,792	41–40	8
82	July 3	@ Yankees	3–11	Pettitte (10–2)	Romero (6–5)		46,364	41–41	9
83	July 4	@ Yankees	6–7 (10)	Robertson (1–3)	Purcey (0–1)		46,810	41–42	10
84	July 6	Twins	6–7	Mijares (1–0)	Frasor (3–2)	Rauch (19)	15,072	41–43	11 1/2
85	July 7	Twins	6–5	Downs (3–5)	Guerrier (1–5)	Gregg (19)	14,886	42–43	11 1/2
86	July 8	Twins	8–1	Cecil (8–5)	Baker (7–8)		15,601	43–43	11 1/2
87	July 9	Red Sox	3–14	Lester (11–3)	Romero (6–6)		27,567	43–44	12 1/2
88	July 10	Red Sox	9–5	Camp (3–1)	Lackey (9–5)	Gregg (20)	35,037	44–44	11 1/2
89	July 11	Red Sox	2–3	Matsuzaka (6–3)	Litsch (0–4)	Papelbon (20)	26,062	44–45	12 1/2
July 13: 81st MLB All-Star Game in Anaheim, California, at Angel Stadium
90	July 16	@ Orioles	4–2	Romero (7–6)	Bergesen (3–7)	Gregg (21)	18,120	45–45	12 1/2
91	July 17	@ Orioles	3–2	Morrow (6–6)	Berken (2–2)	Camp (1)	28,518	46–45	11 1/2
92	July 18	@ Orioles	10–1	Marcum (8–4)	Matusz (3–10)		14,032	47–45	11 1/2
93	July 19	@ Royals	4–5 (10)	Farnsworth (3–0)	Gregg (0–4)		12,968	47–46	12
94	July 20	@ Royals	13–1	Litsch (1–4)	Lerew (1–4)		18,865	48–46	11
95	July 21	@ Royals	2–5	Greinke (6–9)	Rzepczynski (0–1)	Soria (26)	15,285	48–47	12
96	July 22	@ Tigers	2–5	Verlander (12–5)	Romero (7–7)	Valverde (20)	34,476	48–48	13
–	July 23	@ Tigers	Postponed (rain) Rescheduled for July 25						13 1/2
97	July 24	@ Tigers	3–2	Marcum (9–4)	Porcello (4–8)	Gregg (22)	39,391	49–48	12 1/2
98	July 25	@ Tigers	5–3	Downs (4–5)	Valverde (1–2)	Gregg (23)	38,526	50–48	12 1/2
99	July 25	@ Tigers	5–6	Coke (6–1)	Frasor (3–3)	Valverde (21)	37,093	50–49	13
100	July 26	Orioles	9–5	Morrow (7–6)	Bergesen (3–9)	Purcey (1)	17,422	51–49	13
101	July 27	Orioles	8–2	Romero (8–7)	Millwood (2–10)		16,862	52–49	12
102	July 28	Orioles	5–0	Mills (1–0)	Guthrie (4–11)		17,041	53–49	12 1/2
103	July 30	Indians	8–1	Marcum (10–4)	Masterson (3–10)		20,228	54–49	11 1/2
104	July 31	Indians	1–2	Lewis (3–2)	Tallet (1–4)	Perez (11)	22,663	54–50	12 1/2
August 15–13 (home 8–6, road 7–7, 28/28 GP)
#	Date	Opponent	Score	Win	Loss	Save	Attendance	Record	GB
105	August 1	Indians	4–5	Gómez (2–0)	Litsch (1–5)	Perez (12)	21,797	54–51	12 1/2
106	August 2	@ Yankees	8–6	Morrow (8–6)	Burnett (9–9)	Gregg (24)	47,034	55–51	11 1/2
107	August 3	@ Yankees	8–2	Romero (9–7)	Moseley (1–1)		46,480	56–51	11 1/2
108	August 4	@ Yankees	1–5	Hughes (13–4)	Marcum (10–5)		47,659	56–52	11 1/2
109	August 6	Rays	2–1	Cecil (9–5)	Garza (11–6)	Gregg (25)	22,520	57–52	10 1/2
110	August 7	Rays	17–11	Tallet (2–4)	Shields (10–10)		24,168	58–52	10 1/2
111	August 8	Rays	1–0	Morrow (9–6)	Sonnanstine (2–1)		22,313	59–52	10 1/2
112	August 10	Red Sox	5–7	Doubront (2–2)	Camp (3–2)	Papelbon (29)	27,690	59–53	10
113	August 11	Red Sox	1–10	Buchholz (13–5)	Marcum (10–6)		28,308	59–54	11
114	August 12	Red Sox	6–5	Gregg (1–4)	Papelbon (4–5)		36,271	60–54	11
115	August 13	@ Angels	3–0	Rzepczynski (1–1)	Kazmir (8–10)	Gregg (26)	40,606	61–54	10
116	August 14	@ Angels	2–7	Santana (12–8)	Cecil (9–6)		42,059	61–55	11
117	August 15	@ Angels	4–1	Romero (10–7)	Haren (8–11)	Gregg (27)	38,138	62–55	10
118	August 16	@ Athletics	3–1	Marcum (11–6)	Anderson (3–4)		10,136	63–55	9
119	August 17	@ Athletics	2–6	Braden (8–8)	Tallet (2–5)	Wuertz (6)	13,237	63–56	10
120	August 18	@ Athletics	4–5	Ziegler (3–4)	Janssen (4–1)		18,046	63–57	11
121	August 20	@ Red Sox	16–2	Cecil (10–6)	Lester (13–8)		37,726	64–57	10 1/2
122	August 21	@ Red Sox	4–5 (11)	Papelbon (5–5)	Janssen (4–2)		37,614	64–58	11 1/2
123	August 22	@ Red Sox	0–5	Buchholz (15–5)	Marcum (11–7)	Doubront (2)	37,506	64–59	12 1/2
124	August 23	Yankees	3–2	Downs (5–5)	Robertson (2–4)	Gregg (28)	29,198	65–59	11 1/2
125	August 24	Yankees	5–11	Moseley (4–2)	Rzepczynski (1–2)		30,567	65–60	12 1/2
126	August 25	Yankees	6–3	Cecil (11–6)	Hughes (15–6)	Gregg (29)	31,449	66–60	11 1/2
127	August 26	Tigers	1–7	Scherzer (10–9)	Romero (10–8)		16,088	66–61	12
128	August 27	Tigers	3–2 (11)	Camp (4–2)	Coke (7–3)		20,298	67–61	11
129	August 28	Tigers	5–4	Morrow (10–6)	Fígaro (0–2)	Gregg (30)	27,119	68–61	11
130	August 29	Tigers	4–10	Porcello (7–11)	Rzepczynski (1–3)		26,624	68–62	12
131	August 30	@ Rays	2–6	Davis (11–9)	Cecil (11–7)		11,968	68–63	13
132	August 31	@ Rays	13–5	Romero (11–8)	Niemann (10–5)		12,972	69–63	13
September 14–13 (home 10–6, road 4–7, 27/27 GP)
#	Date	Opponent	Score	Win	Loss	Save	Attendance	Record	GB
133	September 1	@ Rays	1–2	Price (16–6)	Camp (4–3)	Soriano (40)	14,859	69–64	14
134	September 3	@ Yankees	3–7	Wood (3–4)	Morrow (10–7)		44,739	69–65	15 1/2
135	September 4	@ Yankees	5–7	Chamberlain (2–4)	Frasor (3–4)	Rivera (29)	47,478	69–66	16 1/2
136	September 5	@ Yankees	7–3	Cecil (12–7)	Hughes (16–7)		47,737	70–66	15 1/2
137	September 6	Rangers	7–2	Romero (12–8)	Hunter (12–3)		17,559	71–66	14 1/2
138	September 7	Rangers	8–5	Marcum (12–7)	Feldman (6–10)	Gregg (31)	10,518	72–66	13 1/2
139	September 8	Rangers	1–8	Holland (3–3)	Rzepczynski (1–4)		10,616	72–67	14 1/2
140	September 9	Rangers	2–4	Lewis (10–12)	Hill (0–1)	Feliz (35)	10,658	72–68	15
141	September 10	Rays	8–9	Benoit (1–2)	Gregg (1–5)	Soriano (42)	14,305	72–69	15
142	September 11	Rays	1–13	Davis (12–9)	Romero (12–9)		17,632	72–70	15
143	September 12	Rays	5–4	Gregg (2–5)	Soriano (2–2)		14,658	73–70	14
144	September 13	@ Orioles	3–4 (11)	Hernandez (7–8)	Tallet (2–6)		9,882	73–71	14 1/2
145	September 14	@ Orioles	3–11	Arrieta (6–6)	Hill (0–2)		16,589	73–72	15
146	September 15	@ Orioles	1–3	Bergesen (7–10)	Drabek (0–1)		13,651	73–73	15 1/2
147	September 17	@ Red Sox	11–9	Cecil (13–7)	Lackey (12–11)	Gregg (32)	37,679	74–73	15
148	September 18	@ Red Sox	4–3	Romero (13–9)	Beckett (5–5)	Gregg (33)	37,863	75–73	15
149	September 19	@ Red Sox	0–6	Lester (18–8)	Marcum (12–8)		37,234	75–74	15
150	September 21	Mariners	5–3	Rzepczynski (2–4)	French (4–6)	Gregg (34)	12,158	76–74	15 1/2
151	September 22	Mariners	3–6	Pauley (3–8)	Drabek (0–2)		12,302	76–75	15 1/2
152	September 23	Mariners	1–0	Hill (1–2)	Hernández (12–12)	Gregg (35)	12,590	77–75	14 1/2
153	September 24	Orioles	6–4	Cecil (14–7)	Tillman (1–5)	Carlson (1)	13,412	78–75	14
154	September 25	Orioles	5–4 (11)	Purcey (1–1)	Hendrickson (1–6)		21,504	79–75	14
155	September 26	Orioles	5–2	Marcum (13–8)	VandenHurk (0–1)	Frasor (4)	17,831	80–75	13
156	September 27	Yankees	7–5	Rzepczynski (3–4)	Burnett (10–15)	Gregg (36)	16,004	81–75	12
157	September 28	Yankees	1–6	Sabathia (21–7)	Drabek (0–3)		18,193	81–76	13
158	September 29	Yankees	8–4	Cecil (15–7)	Vázquez (10–10)		33,143	82–76	12
159	September 30	@ Twins	13–2	Janssen (5–2)	Liriano (14–10)		39,477	83–76	11
October 2–1 (road 2–1, 3/3 GP)
#	Date	Opponent	Score	Win	Loss	Save	Attendance	Record	GB
160	October 1	@ Twins	6–3	Romero (14–9)	Crain (1–1)	Gregg (37)	39,937	84–76	10 1/2
161	October 2	@ Twins	4–5	Capps (2–0)	Gregg (2–6)		40,235	84–77	11
162	October 3	@ Twins	2–1	Rzepczynski (4–4)	Blackburn (10–12)	Camp (2)	40,664	85–77	11

- All times are p.m. Eastern

== Player stats ==
= Indicates team leader

= Indicates league leader

=== Batting ===
Note: G = Games played; AB = At bats; R = Runs; H = Hits; 2B = Doubles; 3B = Triples; HR = Home runs; RBI = Runs batted in; SB = Stolen bases; BB = Walks; AVG = Batting average; SLG = Slugging percentage

Player	G	AB	R	H	2B	3B	HR	RBI	SB	BB	AVG	SLG
Vernon Wells	157	590	79	161	44	3	31	88	6	50	.273	.515
José Bautista	161	569	109	148	35	3	54	124	9	100	.260	.617
Adam Lind	150	569	57	135	32	3	23	72	0	38	.237	.425
Lyle Overbay	154	534	75	130	37	2	20	67	1	67	.243	.433
Aaron Hill	138	528	70	108	22	0	26	68	2	41	.205	.394
Fred Lewis	110	428	70	112	31	5	8	36	17	38	.262	.414
John Buck	118	409	53	115	25	0	20	66	0	16	.281	.489
Edwin Encarnación	96	332	47	81	16	0	21	51	1	29	.244	.482
Álex González	85	328	47	85	25	1	17	50	1	17	.259	.497
Travis Snider	82	298	36	76	20	0	14	32	6	21	.255	.463
Yunel Escobar	60	236	32	65	7	0	4	16	1	19	.275	.356
José Molina	57	167	13	41	4	0	6	12	1	9	.246	.377
John McDonald	63	152	27	38	9	2	6	23	2	6	.250	.454
DeWayne Wise	52	112	20	28	3	2	3	14	4	4	.250	.393
Mike McCoy	46	82	9	16	4	0	0	3	5	8	.195	.244
Randy Ruiz	13	40	3	6	2	0	1	1	1	0	.150	.275
J.P. Arencibia	11	35	3	5	1	0	2	4	0	2	.143	.343
Jarrett Hoffpauir	13	34	1	7	1	0	0	0	0	2	.206	.235
Jeremy Reed	14	21	1	3	0	0	1	3	1	2	.143	.286
Nick Green	9	13	2	2	0	0	0	1	0	1	.154	.154
Pitcher totals	162	18	1	2	1	0	0	1	0	1	.111	.167
Team totals	162	5495	755	1364	319	21	257	732	'58	471	.248	.454

=== Pitching ===
Note: W = Wins; L = Losses; ERA = Earned run average; G = Games pitched; GS = Games started; SV = Saves; IP = Innings pitched; H = Hits allowed; R = Runs allowed; ER = Earned runs allowed; BB = Walks allowed; SO = Strikeouts

Player	W	L	ERA	G	GS	SV	IP	H	R	ER	BB	SO
Ricky Romero	14	9	3.73	32	32	0	210.0	189	98	87	82	174
Shaun Marcum	13	8	3.64	31	31	0	195.1	181	84	79	43	165
Brett Cecil	15	7	4.22	28	28	0	172.2	175	87	81	54	117
Brandon Morrow	10	7	4.49	26	26	0	146.1	136	76	73	66	178
Brian Tallet	2	6	6.40	34	5	0	77.1	84	60	55	38	53
Shawn Camp	4	3	2.99	70	0	2	72.1	71	26	24	18	46
Casey Janssen	5	2	3.67	56	0	0	68.2	74	29	28	21	63
Marc Rzepczynski	4	4	4.95	14	12	0	63.2	72	37	35	30	57
Jason Frasor	3	4	3.68	69	0	4	63.2	61	30	26	27	65
Scott Downs	5	5	2.64	67	0	0	61.1	47	19	18	14	48
Kevin Gregg	2	6	3.51	63	0	37	59.0	52	24	23	30	58
Jesse Litsch	1	5	5.79	9	9	0	46.2	53	30	30	15	16
Dana Eveland	3	4	6.45	9	9	0	44.2	57	35	32	27	21
David Purcey	1	1	3.71	33	0	1	34.0	26	16	14	15	32
Brad Mills	1	0	5.64	7	3	0	22.1	20	14	14	13	18
Shawn Hill	1	2	2.61	4	4	0	20.2	24	8	6	4	14
Josh Roenicke	1	0	5.68	16	0	0	19.0	18	15	12	13	18
Rommie Lewis	0	0	6.75	14	0	0	18.2	20	14	14	8	15
Kyle Drabek	0	3	4.76	3	3	0	17.0	18	9	9	5	12
Jesse Carlson	0	0	4.61	20	0	1	13.2	13	7	7	5	8
Jeremy Accardo	0	1	8.10	5	0	0	6.2	12	6	6	3	3
Robert Ray	0	0	2.45	3	0	0	3.2	2	1	1	5	3
Taylor Buchholz	0	0	0.00	2	0	0	2.0	0	0	0	0	0
Merkin Valdez	0	0	20.25	2	0	0	1.1	2	3	3	3	0
Team totals	85	77	4.22	162	162	45	1440.2	1407	728	676	539	1184

== Minor leagues ==
League	Team	Record	Place	Manager
AAA	Las Vegas 51s	56–60	3rd	Dan Rohn
AA	New Hampshire Fisher Cats	67–48	1st	Luis Rivera
Advanced A	Dunedin Blue Jays	59–55	3rd	Clayton McCullough
A	Lansing Lugnuts	56–55	4th	Sal Fasano
Short-Season A	Auburn Doubledays	19–31	2nd	Dennis Holmberg
Rookie	Gulf Coast League Blue Jays	19–22	6th	John Schneider

== Honours and awards ==
All-Star Game

- José Bautista, 1st selection – 0–1
- John Buck, 1st selection – 1–2, 2B
- Vernon Wells, 3rd selection – 0–1

Home Run Derby

- Vernon Wells, 1st selection – 2 HR, 7th place

Player of the Week

- José Bautista – May 10–16
- José Bautista – July 26 – August 1 (with Matt Garza)
- José Bautista – August 23–29
- Edwin Encarnación – September 27 – October 3

Player of the Month

- José Bautista – July (with Delmon Young), August

Hank Aaron Award

- José Bautista

Silver Slugger

- José Bautista – OF
