= Joe Cowley =

Joe Cowley may refer to:

- Joe Cowley (sportswriter), columnist for the Chicago Sun-Times
- Joe Cowley (baseball), American baseball pitcher
