= Kyle Drabek =

American baseball pitcher (born 1987)

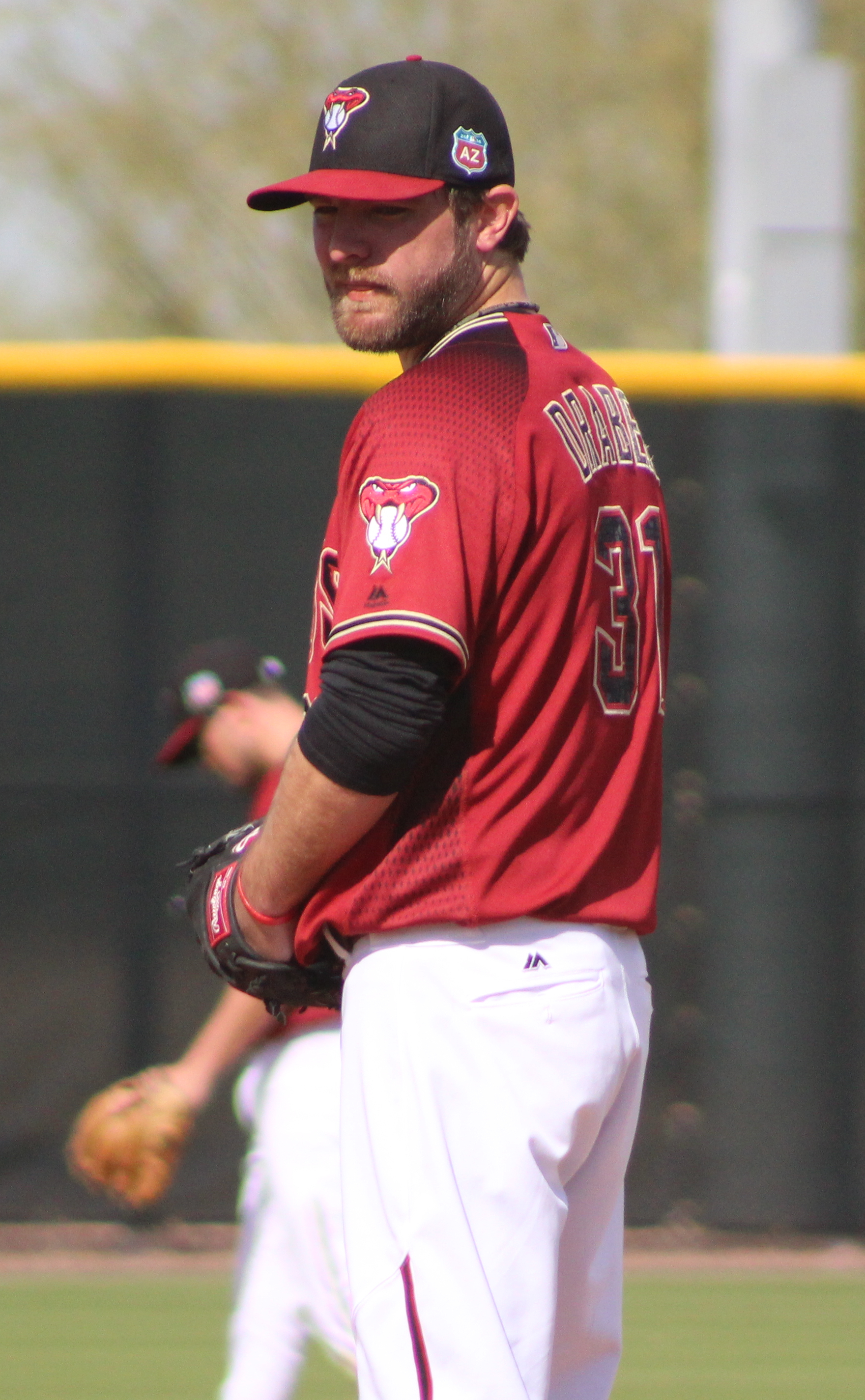
- Drabek with the Arizona Diamondbacks
- Pitcher
- Born: December 8, 1987 (age 38); Victoria, Texas, U.S.
- Batted: Right Threw: Right

MLB debut
- September 15, 2010, for the Toronto Blue Jays

Last MLB appearance
- April 7, 2016, for the Arizona Diamondbacks

MLB statistics
- Win–loss record: 8–15
- Earned run average: 5.26
- Strikeouts: 123
- WHIP: 1.70
- Stats at Baseball Reference

Teams
- Toronto Blue Jays (2010–2014); Chicago White Sox (2015); Arizona Diamondbacks (2016)

Kyle Jordan Drabek (born December 8, 1987) is an American former professional baseball pitcher. He played in Major League Baseball (MLB) for the Toronto Blue Jays, Chicago White Sox, and Arizona Diamondbacks.

Drabek is the son of former major-league pitcher and 1990 National League Cy Young Award winner Doug Drabek. Kyle is one of only four sons of former Cy Young Award winners to reach the big leagues, the others being Vance Law (son of 1960 MLB winner Vern Law), Cam Bedrosian (son of 1987 NL winner Steve Bedrosian), and Kody Clemens (son of seven time winner Roger Clemens).

He wore the single-digit uniform number 4, a rarity among pitchers, while with the Blue Jays.

== High school ==
Drabek attended The Woodlands High School. While there, he was an Aflac, USA Today, and Louisville Slugger high-school All-American at pitcher and shortstop. Drabek was paired on a Houston summer select team, Houston Heat, with Jay Bruce. While in high school, Drabek was named 2005 and 2006 Texas 5-A player of the year. During the 2006 spring season, the Highlanders won the Texas 5-A State Championship. During his high-school career, Drabek compiled a record of 30–1 on the mound while belting 27 home runs. In the 2006 Texas regional semifinal, he set The Woodlands High School record for most strikeouts in a game by a pitcher (19), recording a no-hitter.

He first wore the number 4 as a wide receiver on The Woodlands varsity football team. He wore number 1 for baseball.

== Professional career ==
=== Philadelphia Phillies ===
==== Minor leagues ====
In the 2006 Major League Baseball draft, Drabek was selected in the first round by the Philadelphia Phillies as the 18th overall pick; he was chosen as a compensation pick from the New York Mets, to whom the Phillies had lost Billy Wagner via free agency. Drabek had been ranked as the 12th-best prospect in the draft by Baseball America, but was drafted in a lower position because, at the time of the draft, there were concerns about personal incidents. Marti Wolever, director of scouting for the Phillies, stated of the issues that the Phillies "feel very good about this selection. We think everything is behind him and we're moving on." The Phillies opted to develop Drabek as a pitcher in their farm system.

Drabek learned from the experiences of his father. He also described his father's involvement to be "like having a pitching coach who lives with you ... He taught me so much, not only about the physical part of the game, but the mental part too."

What kind of things I should expect. I think it's going to give me a little bit more of an advantage because he's been through everything. I know what to look out for because of him.

— Kyle Drabek, Houston Chronicle

He made four pitching appearances in the Gulf Coast League (for rookies) since his comeback from Tommy John surgery. He was then promoted to the Low-A Williamsport Crosscutters. After a dominant start to the season with the High-A Clearwater Threshers, Drabek was promoted to the Double-A Reading Phillies on June 1, 2009. He was invited to the 2009 All-Star Futures Game, in which he pitched one inning.

Drabek received the Paul Owens Award from the Phillies in a pregame ceremony at Citizens Bank Park on September 15, 2009. The annual award is presented to the top pitcher and the top position player in the Phillies' minor-league system.

=== Toronto Blue Jays ===
Drabek was one of the key players involved in "The Doc Deal", the trade that sent Blue Jays ace Roy Halladay to the Phillies for Drabek, Travis d'Arnaud, and Michael Taylor in early December. He was officially announced as a member of the Blue Jays on December 16, 2009. Drabek threw the second no-hitter in Double-A New Hampshire Fisher Cats history on July 4, 2010. The final score was 5–0 over the New Britain Rock Cats, as he walked two and struck out three.

Drabek was voted the 2010 Eastern League pitcher of the year. Drabek attributed some of his success to a more consistent delivery, for which the point of release for different pitches appeared the same to batters. "In the beginning, it was like I had different movements for different pitches. Now, everything comes the same and everything stays the same."

==== Major leagues ====
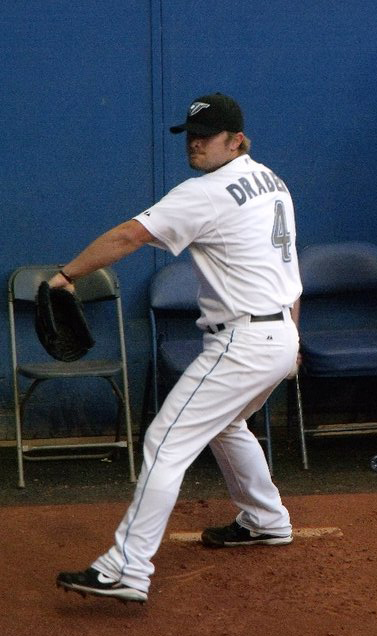
Drabek with the Toronto Blue Jays in 2010

The Blue Jays announced on September 12, 2010, that Drabek would be promoted to make his major league debut on September 15. At the time, he was considered the Blue Jays top pitching prospect and amongst the top prospects in baseball. On April 2, Drabek earned his first Major League win against the Minnesota Twins, throwing 101 pitches through 7 innings, with 7 strikeouts, giving up only 1 hit and 1 earned run. His father, Doug Drabek, also earned his first career win against the Minnesota Twins in 1986.

His worst career outing occurred on June 1, 2011, when he lasted only 0.2 innings versus the Cleveland Indians. He used 38 pitches, allowing four earned runs on three hits, three walks, and one strikeout.

On June 14, the Blue Jays announced that Drabek had been optioned to Triple-A Las Vegas. Zach Stewart took his place in the rotation. Drabek was recalled from the minors on September 7.

On June 8, 2012, Drabek took his first Major League at bat. He struck out against Atlanta Braves pitcher Brandon Beachy. He finished the game 0–2.

In his June 13 start against the visiting Washington Nationals, Drabek "felt a pop in his elbow" during the fifth inning while pitching to Michael Morse. With a one-ball, one-strike count on Morse, Drabek exited the game and was replaced by Aaron Laffey. Drabek was placed on the 15-day disabled list on June 15 with a right elbow sprain. On June 18, it was announced that Drabek would undergo Tommy John surgery for the second time in his career, ending his 2012 season. On May 7, 2013, it was reported that Drabek was on track to return in mid-June, one year since undergoing surgery.

Drabek started his rehab assignment with the Class A-Advanced Dunedin Blue Jays on June 22, 2013. On July 5, Drabek was taken off the 60-day disabled list and optioned to Dunedin. He was promoted to the Double-A New Hampshire Fisher Cats on July 29, and to the Triple-A Buffalo Bisons on August 14. He was recalled by the Blue Jays on September 3 after the Bisons' season ended, and the MLB rosters expanded. Drabek made his 2013 season debut on September 7, in a game against the Minnesota Twins.

Drabek was optioned to the Buffalo Bisons on March 16, 2014. He was recalled to Toronto on August 16, 2014, after going 7–7 with a 4.00 ERA in 29 appearances for Buffalo. His first appearance for the Blue Jays came on August 19, in a 6–1 loss to the Milwaukee Brewers. Drabek pitched two innings and yielded only one hit while striking out three. He was optioned back to Buffalo on August 24.

=== Chicago White Sox ===
The Blue Jays placed Drabek on waivers on March 27, 2015. He was claimed that day by the Chicago White Sox. Drabek made his White Sox debut on Opening Day, and gave up a three-run home run to Alex Ríos. He was designated for assignment on April 20, and outrighted to the Triple-A Charlotte Knights on April 22. He elected free agency on November 6.

=== Arizona Diamondbacks ===
On November 18, 2015, Drabek signed a minor league contract with the Arizona Diamondbacks. He had his contract selected to the major league roster on April 5. He was designated for assignment on April 8. He cleared waivers and was sent outright to Triple-A Reno Aces on April 11. After posting a 6.68 ERA with 33 walks in 68 2/3 innings for Triple-A Reno, he was released on June 28, 2016.

=== San Francisco Giants ===
On July 12, 2016, the San Francisco Giants signed Drabek to a minor league contract to play shortstop. He played in 10 games for the rookie-level Arizona League Giants, hitting .160/.214/.200 with three RBI. Drabek elected free agency following the season on November 7.

=== Sugar Land Skeeters ===
On March 21, 2017, Drabek signed with the Sugar Land Skeeters of the Atlantic League of Professional Baseball. He made 6 starts for the Skeeters, struggling to an 8.33 ERA with 16 strikeouts across 27 innings of work. Drabek was released on May 24.

=== Pericos de Puebla ===
On February 26, 2018, Drabek signed with the Pericos de Puebla of the Mexican League. He struggled immensely in two starts, posting an 0–2 record and 49.50 ERA with two strikeouts over two innings.

=== Southern Maryland Blue Crabs ===
On July 17, 2018, Drabek signed with the Southern Maryland Blue Crabs of the Atlantic League of Professional Baseball. In 6 games (5 starts), he struggled to a 7.43 ERA with 5 strikeouts across 13 1/3 innings pitched. Drabek became a free agent following the 2018 season.

== Pitching style ==
Drabek throws a four-seam fastball clocked between 90 and 96 mph, a curveball in the 79–83 mph range, a cutter with a velocity of 89–95 mph, and a changeup at 83–86 mph.

== See also ==
- List of second-generation Major League Baseball players
