= Brett Wallace =

American baseball player (born 1986)

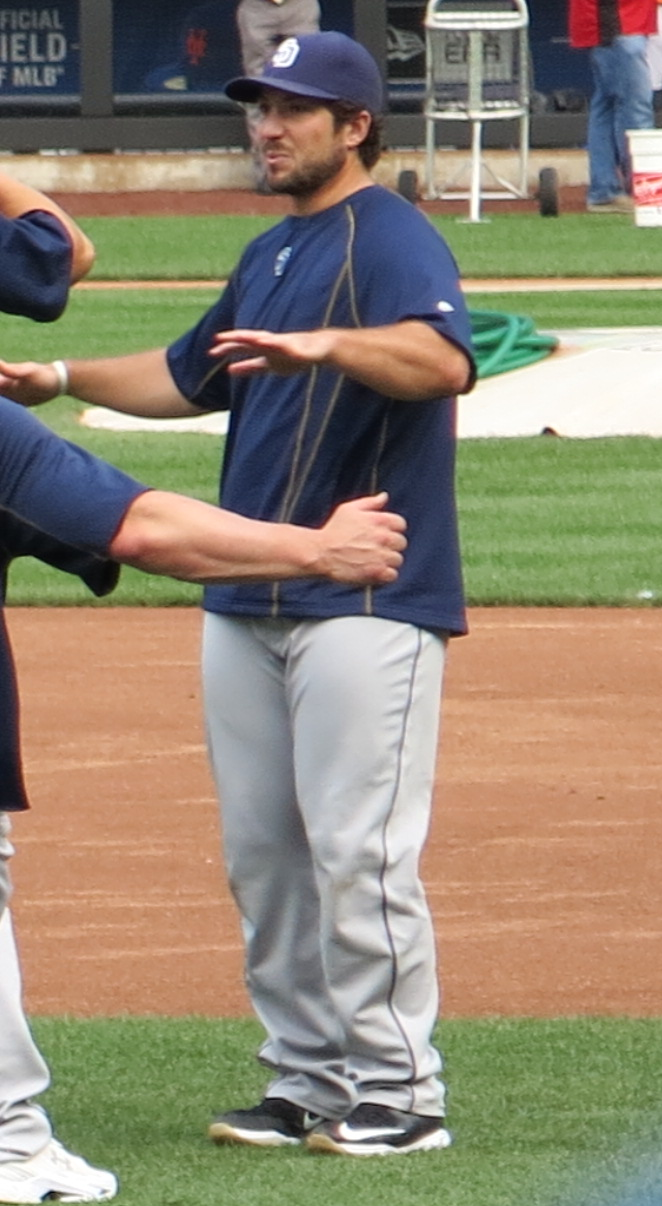
- Wallace with the Padres in 2016

California Golden Bears
- Hitting coach
- Born: August 26, 1986 (age 40); Sonoma, California, U.S.
- Batted: Left Threw: Right

MLB debut
- July 31, 2010, for the Houston Astros

Last MLB appearance
- September 28, 2016, for the San Diego Padres

MLB statistics
- Batting average: .238
- Home runs: 40
- Runs batted in: 138
- Stats at Baseball Reference

Teams
- Houston Astros (2010–2013); San Diego Padres (2015–2016)
Medals
Men's baseball
Representing United States
Pan American Games
Silver medal – second place	2007 Rio de Janeiro	Team

Brett Alexander Wallace (born August 26, 1986) is an American former professional baseball infielder. He played in Major League Baseball (MLB) for the Houston Astros and San Diego Padres. He is currently the hitting coach for the California Golden Bears baseball team, competing in the Atlantic Coast Conference.

== High school ==
A 2005 graduate of Justin-Siena High School in Napa, California, Wallace earned four varsity baseball letters for head coach Allen Rossi. He helped lead Justin-Siena to a 97–9 record during his prep career, including a perfect 27–0 senior season. He broke nine school records during his prep career and holds single-season school records for walks, runs, hits, RBI, home runs and slugging percentage. Among his numerous accolades, Wallace was named a Collegiate Baseball/Louisville Slugger All-American and 2005 first-team All-State (CalHiSports.com) and 2005 California Small Schools Player of the Year. He was also a four-time All-Marin County Athletic League selection, 2004 and 2005 All-Napa County Offensive Player of the Year.

== College career ==
Wallace was a two-time Pac-10 Player of the Year (2007 & 2008) and a two-time Triple Crown Winner at Arizona State University. He was the 12th Sun Devil to win the Pac-10 Player of the Year award, and the first since Dustin Pedroia shared the award in 2003.

Wallace played third base for the Sun Devils, teaming with Ike Davis at first base and Jason Kipnis in center field. The 2008 ASU squad also featured former St. Louis Cardinals pitcher Mike Leake and former San Diego Padres pitcher Josh Spence. In 2006, he played collegiate summer baseball with the Falmouth Commodores of the Cape Cod Baseball League and was named a league all-star.

== Professional career ==
=== Early career ===
The Toronto Blue Jays selected Wallace in the 42nd round of the 2005 MLB draft, but he did not sign with the team. After his collegiate career, he was picked by the St. Louis Cardinals as their first round (13th overall) selection of the 2008 MLB draft out of Arizona State University. After his performance at Single-A Quad Cities, Wallace skipped High-A Palm Beach and was promoted immediately to the Double-A Springfield Cardinals. He began 2009 playing for Springfield before being promoted to the Triple-A Memphis Redbirds. During his career in the minor leagues, Wallace split time between first base and third base.

On July 24, 2009, Wallace was traded to the Oakland Athletics as part of a package for outfielder Matt Holliday.

On December 15, 2009, Wallace was dealt to the Toronto Blue Jays for Michael Taylor, who was obtained by the Blue Jays from the Philadelphia Phillies as part of a trade for Roy Halladay.

=== Houston Astros ===
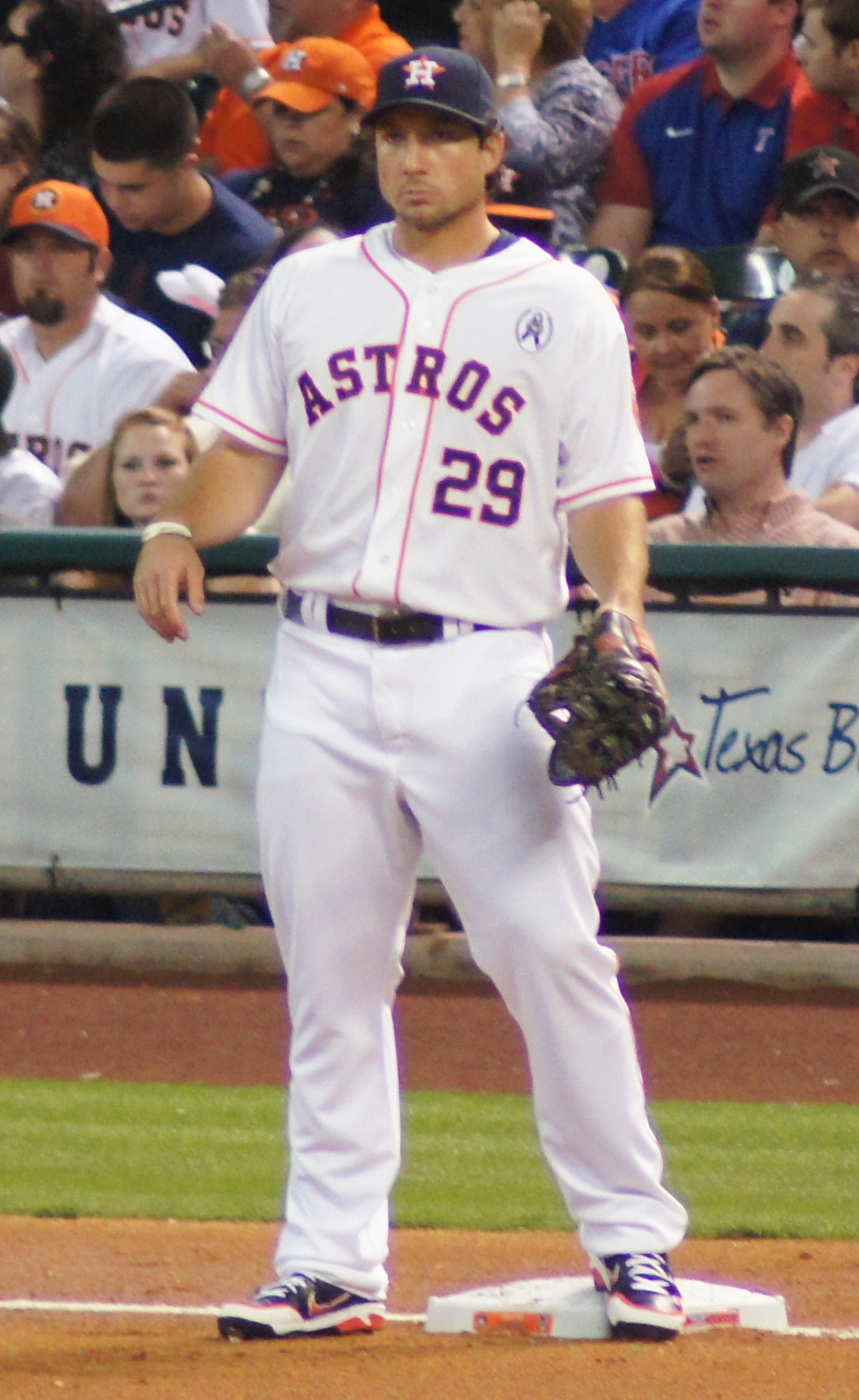
Wallace with the Astros

On July 29, 2010, the Blue Jays traded Wallace to the Houston Astros, in exchange for minor league outfielder Anthony Gose, who had just been obtained by the Astros from the Phillies as part of a trade for Roy Oswalt. Wallace was sent to the Triple-A affiliate, the Round Rock Express, for one day and did not appear in a game before being called up by the Astros on July 31, 2010 after Lance Berkman was traded to the New York Yankees. Wallace made his MLB debut against the Milwaukee Brewers the same day, and went 0–4. On August 1, he got his first MLB career hit, a single, against Brewers' pitcher Randy Wolf. On September 7 Wallace hit his first MLB career home run off Chicago Cubs pitcher Carlos Silva, tying the game.

On August 1, 2011, Wallace was sent back to the Triple-A Oklahoma City RedHawks club.

Wallace started the 2012 season with the RedHawks, and was recalled by Houston on June 3 when Carlos Lee was placed on the disabled list. He returned to Oklahoma City on June 17 when Lee was re-activated. Wallace was recalled again on July 30 when Brian Bixler was optioned to Oklahoma City.

Wallace began the 2013 season with the Astros. However, due to a slow start in which he batted .042 in 17 games, he was optioned to Oklahoma City on April 18. On June 25, he was called back up to start against the St. Louis Cardinals.

On February 6, 2014, the Astros designated Wallace for assignment to make room for Jerome Williams. He was released on March 12.

=== Baltimore Orioles ===
Wallace signed a minor league contract with the Baltimore Orioles organization on March 23, 2014. In 90 appearances for the Triple-A Norfolk Tides, Wallace batted .265/.329/.389 with 10 home runs and 35 RBI.

=== Toronto Blue Jays ===
On July 14, 2014, Wallace was traded to the Toronto Blue Jays in exchange for cash considerations. He was subsequently assigned to the Triple-A Buffalo Bisons of the International League. On August 24, Wallace clubbed a walk-off grand slam in the 12th inning to cap a three home run, six RBI game, as the Bisons rallied for a 10–6 victory over visiting Pawtucket Red Sox. Wallace joined Fernando Martínez (2012) and Marco Scutaro (1999) as the only Bisons to hit walk-off grand slams at Coca-Cola Field. It was also the sixth three-homer game in franchise history and the first since May 19, 2012, when Vinny Rottino achieved the feat against the Indianapolis Indians. In 38 appearances for Triple-A Buffalo, he batted .323/.404/.519 with seven home runs and 23 RBI.

=== San Diego Padres ===
On December 13, 2014, Wallace signed a minor league contract including an invitation to major league spring training with the San Diego Padres.

On June 19, 2015, the Padres called Wallace up. He finished the season with a .302/.374/.521 slash line in 107 plate appearances for the Padres. The following off season, the Padres and Wallace avoided arbitration by agreeing to a $1 million contract for 2016. Wallace was given the starting third base job when Yangervis Solarte was placed on the disabled list with a hamstring injury. Wallace failed to repeat his 2015 production in 2016, finishing the season with a .189/.309/.318 slash line in 256 plate appearances. On November 18, 2016, Wallace was removed from the 40–man roster and sent outright to the Triple–A El Paso Chihuahuas after multiple prospects were added to the roster. He subsequently rejected the assignment and elected free agency.

On December 24, 2016, Wallace signed a new minor league contract with the Padres. On April 2, 2017, he was released.

Wallace ended his career following the 2017 season.

== Coaching career ==
On August 1, 2024, Wallace was hired as the hitting coach for the California Golden Bears baseball team.
