= Michael Taylor (baseball, born 1985) =

American baseball player

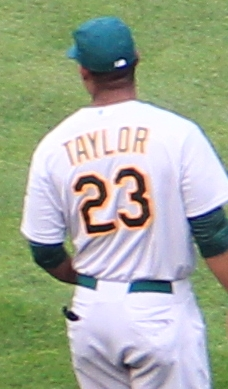
- Taylor with the Oakland Athletics
- Outfielder
- Born: December 19, 1985 (age 40); Cheverly, Maryland, U.S.
- Batted: Right Threw: Right

MLB debut
- September 2, 2011, for the Oakland Athletics

Last MLB appearance
- September 28, 2014, for the Chicago White Sox

MLB statistics
- Batting average: .167
- Home runs: 1
- Runs batted in: 1
- Stats at Baseball Reference

Teams
- Oakland Athletics (2011–2013); Chicago White Sox (2014)

Michael David Taylor (born December 19, 1985) is an American former professional baseball outfielder. He played in Major League Baseball (MLB) for the Oakland Athletics and Chicago White Sox from 2011 through 2014.

== Early life ==
Taylor was born in Cheverly, Maryland, and graduated from Apopka High School in Apopka, Florida. He played college baseball at Stanford University. In 2006, he played collegiate summer baseball in the Cape Cod Baseball League for the Yarmouth-Dennis Red Sox.

== Baseball career ==
=== Philadelphia Phillies ===
Taylor was drafted by the Philadelphia Phillies in the fifth round of the 2007 Major League Baseball draft out of Stanford University. At the end of the 2009 season, he was one of two players given the Paul Owens Award, for best pitcher and best position player (which went to Taylor) in the Phillies' farm system. He was also selected as the Eastern League Rookie of the Year while playing for the Reading Phillies.

=== Oakland Athletics ===
On December 16, 2009, Taylor was traded to the Toronto Blue Jays with Kyle Drabek and Travis D'Arnaud in exchange for Roy Halladay. The Blue Jays immediately traded him to the Oakland Athletics for Brett Wallace. He spent the entire 2010 season at Triple-A Sacramento and played in the Arizona Fall League.

On September 2, 2011, Taylor made his major league debut with Oakland, batting ninth and playing right field. In total, his brief 2011 stint with the A's included 11 games, 6 hits, 1 HR, 1 RBI and a .200 batting average.

Taylor was designated for assignment by the Athletics on March 29, 2014.

=== Chicago White Sox ===
On June 14, 2014, the A's traded Taylor to the Chicago White Sox in exchange for Jake Sanchez. On October 24, Taylor was removed from the 40-man roster and sent outright to the Triple-A Charlotte Knights and later that same day he elected free agency.

On January 10, 2015, Taylor re-signed with Chicago on a minor league contract. On March 10, Taylor announced his retirement from professional baseball.
