= Rommie Lewis =

American baseball player (born 1982)

- Pitcher
- Born: September 2, 1982 (age 43); Seattle, Washington, U.S.
- Batted: Left Threw: Left

MLB debut
- April 28, 2010, for the Toronto Blue Jays

Last MLB appearance
- September 6, 2011, for the Toronto Blue Jays

MLB statistics
- Win–loss record: 0–0
- Earned run average: 7.23
- Strikeouts: 20
- Stats at Baseball Reference

Teams
- Toronto Blue Jays (2010–2011)

Rommie Lee Lewis, Jr. (born September 2, 1982) is an American former professional baseball pitcher. He pitched in Major League Baseball (MLB) for the Toronto Blue Jays in 2010 and 2011. He later pitched in independent baseball and in the Chinese Professional Baseball League in Taiwan.

His father, also named Rommie, was named after World War II German General Erwin Rommel.

== Career ==
Lewis attended Newport High School in Bellevue, Washington. He had a 0.61 ERA in 2000 and allowed only 6 walks in 2001, both close to school records.

=== Baltimore Orioles ===
Lewis was selected by the Baltimore Orioles in the fourth round (113th overall selection) of the 2001 Major League Baseball draft. He received a $287,500 signing bonus. He reached the Double-A Bowie Baysox in 2007 and 2008. He became a free agent on November 3, 2008.

=== Toronto Blue Jays ===
Lewis signed as a free agent with the Toronto Blue Jays on January 20, 2009, spending the 2009 season with the Triple-A Las Vegas 51s. Lewis was called up to the Toronto Blue Jays on April 26, 2010. He pitched 14 games in relief, with a 6.75 ERA in 18 2/3 innings. He started 2011 in Triple-A but returned to Toronto on August 16. With Toronto, he allowed 5 runs in 5 innings over six appearances. He had posted a 3–3 record in Triple-A with a 6.60 earned run average and 4 saves in 2011. He elected free agency on October 21.

=== Bridgeport Bluefish ===
Lewis signed with the Bridgeport Bluefish of the Atlantic League of Professional Baseball of Independent League for 2012 season. He was named to the 2012 Atlantic League All Star team.

=== Arizona Diamondbacks ===
Lewis received an invitation to MLB spring training from the Arizona Diamondbacks. He was released before the start of the regular season.

=== York Revolution ===
Lewis pitched for the York Revolution of the Atlantic League from 2013 to 2015.

=== Lamigo Monkeys ===
In August 2013, Lewis signed with the Lamigo Monkeys of the Chinese Professional Baseball League in Taiwan.

=== EDA Rhinos ===
In August 2014, Lewis returned to Korea, pitching for the EDA Rhinos.

=== Lancaster Barnstormers ===
On February 28, 2017, Lewis signed with the Lancaster Barnstormers of the Atlantic League of Professional Baseball. He became a free agent after the season.
