= Joe Cowley (sportswriter) =

American columnist writer

Joe Cowley is a columnist writer for the Chicago Sun-Times. A graduate of Kent State University, Cowley served the same role for the Sun-Times sister publication, the Tinley Park, Illinois Daily Southtown, for several years before being hired by the downtown paper before the 2006 season.

Cowley was one of the regular beat writers covering the White Sox during their 2005 World Series championship.

In May 2004 while traveling with the White Sox on a road trip to Toronto, Cowley made disparaging remarks about the city of Toronto in a radio interview, calling it "nothing but a city in a third-world country." Subsequently during the series in Toronto, Cowley refused to stand for the Canadian national anthem prior to a game. Toronto Blue Jays president Paul Godfrey described Cowley as having “bad manners” and had letters of complaint sent to both Cowley and his publisher over the incident.

Cowley was known for his Twitter persona in which he frequently made controversial remarks to rile up his followers. He described these remarks as satire. He retired his Twitter account following controversy over tweets critical of Title IX.
