= 2010 Tampa Bay Rays season =

2010 Tampa Bay Rays
- American League East champions
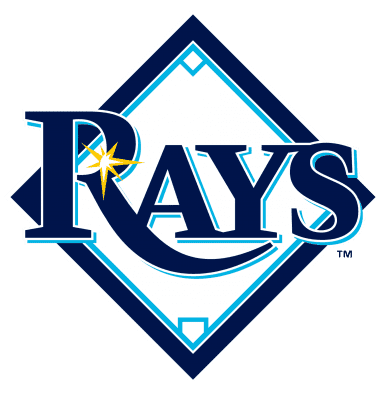
- League: American League
- Division: East
- Ballpark: Tropicana Field
- City: St. Petersburg, Florida
- Record: 96–66 (.593)
- Divisional place: 1st
- Owners: Stuart Sternberg
- General managers: Andrew Friedman (de facto)
- Managers: Joe Maddon
- Television: Fox Sports Florida; Sun Sports (Dewayne Staats, Kevin Kennedy, Brian Anderson, Todd Kalas)
- Radio: Tampa Bay Rays Radio Network (English) (Andy Freed, Dave Wills); WGES (Spanish) (Ricardo Taveras, Enrique Oliu)

The Tampa Bay Rays' 2010 season was their 13th season in Major League Baseball. They improved on their 84–78 record from 2009 by finishing the regular season 96–66, and qualifying for the postseason for the second time in history by winning their second American League East championship in three years. The Rays recorded winning records against every team in the American League except for one, the Kansas City Royals, with whom they tied the regular-season series.

== Offseason ==
Outfielder Gabe Kapler, who had been signed before the 2009 season to just a one-year contract, was re-signed to another one-year deal for $1.05 million on October 27, 2009.

Second baseman Akinori Iwamura was traded to the Pittsburgh Pirates in exchange for relief pitcher Jesse Chavez on November 3, 2009. Iwamura had a $4.85 million option for 2010, but with several other players in the organization who could fill the position, the Rays decided to part ways with Iwamura by trading him. Andrew Friedman, the Rays' Vice President of Baseball Operations, stated that it was "tough to put into words" what "Aki" meant to the Rays, who had been with the team since the 2006 season, and was the player who recorded the final out in the 2008 American League Championship Series that sent the Rays to their first World Series.

On November 9, 2009, the Rays chose to exercise the 2010 option of left fielder Carl Crawford, worth $10 million, but declined the options of relief pitcher Brian Shouse and catcher Gregg Zaun that would have been worth $2 million each.

The Rays acquired catcher Kelly Shoppach from the Cleveland Indians on December 1, 2009, for a player to be named later. That player turned out to be minor-league pitcher Mitch Talbot.

Jesse Chavez was dealt to the Atlanta Braves for relief pitcher Rafael Soriano on December 10, 2009.

The Rays had been in talks with the Chicago Cubs to send Pat Burrell to Chicago in exchange for Milton Bradley. Both players would make the same amount of money in 2010, but while Burrell would be at the end of his contract following the conclusion of the season, Bradley was owed $13 million in 2011, a price the Rays were not willing to take on all of. Unable to make an agreement on how to split the cost, the Cubs eventually sent Bradley to the Seattle Mariners on December 18, 2009.

First baseman Dan Johnson was signed to a $500,000 contract for one year on January 11. Johnson, who played the 2009 season in Japan's Central League, was regarded as a hero for the Rays in the 2008 season for his game-tying solo home run in the 9th inning of a game in early September against the Boston Red Sox at Fenway Park. The Rays, who needed a win that night to keep their division lead over Boston, went on to do just that and eventually won the division.

Relief pitcher J. P. Howell, starting pitcher Matt Garza and shortstop Jason Bartlett all signed one-year contracts to avoid salary arbitration. Only center fielder B. J. Upton went to salary arbitration, though he did state he was interested in a long-term deal with the Rays. Upton's arbitration case was held on February 12. He asked for $3.3 million, but the case was awarded to the Rays, meaning he would make $3 million instead.

On February 3, 2010, the Rays signed reliever Mike Ekstrom, recently waived by the San Diego Padres, to a minor-league contract and placed him on the 40-man roster. Catcher Alvin Colina and reliever Heath Phillips were also signed to minor-league contracts and invited to spring training.

=== Organizational changes ===
One day after the end of the 2008 season, the Rays let hitting coach Steve Henderson go. Quality assurance coach Todd Greene would not return either, as the position was eliminated. Derek Shelton was hired as the team's new hitting coach on October 21. Shelton had been with the Cleveland Indians in the previous five seasons.

On February 3, the Rays announced a naming deal with fertilizer manufacturer The Mosaic Company for Charlotte County Stadium, their spring training facility, changing its name to Mosaic Field at Charlotte Sports Park. However, after public opposition to this deal was made known, the plans were "deferred", and the stadium would continue to be known as Charlotte Sports Park.

Rocco Baldelli returned to the Rays on March 2 as a "special assistant" who would work with younger players. Baldelli stated that he hurt his shoulder in the previous season playing for the Boston Red Sox that may require surgery, and though he felt uncomfortable going into Spring training, he was "not ready to retire" and was hopeful to play again some day. Andrew Friedman, the Rays' Vice President of Baseball Operations, said that the one-year deal was not done with the intention of bringing Baldelli back as a player in 2010, but also said that "anything's possible."

== Summary ==
=== Spring training ===
Infielder Hank Blalock was signed to a minor-league contract on March 8. Blalock was first reported to be interested in signing with either the Rays or the Florida Marlins just days before the deal was made.

Catcher Dioner Navarro injured his left leg on March 20 during a game against the Minnesota Twins, after Twins outfielder Jacque Jones collided with him at the plate. Navarro was reported to be in serious pain and had to be carted off the field. Later that day it was announced that Navarro suffered a bruised nerve. The Rays said that the injury was not bad enough that it would cause Navarro to miss opening day.

The Rays finished spring training with a team record 20 wins, and had the highest win percentage of all teams in the league.

=== April ===
On April 6, during the Rays' first game of the season, Evan Longoria hit a home run that landed in the left field upper deck seating of Tropicana Field. In doing so, Longoria became just the second player to hit a home run that landed in that upper deck section without hitting one of the stadium's catwalks, the first player being Vinny Castilla on April 4, 2001. Longoria's home run was also estimated to have gone 473 feet, making it the third longest home run in the stadium's history, behind a 474-foot home run by Jonny Gomes on July 9, 2005, and the aforementioned home run by Castilla, which traveled 478 feet.

The Rays began the season with a 10–3 record, their best start in franchise history. At one point in the first two weeks of the season, the Rays won seven consecutive games, all on the road. Included in this win streak was their first series sweep of more than two games against the Boston Red Sox at Fenway Park.

Catcher Kelly Shoppach underwent right knee surgery on April 19 and was expected to be out for 4–6 weeks.

On April 23, Ben Zobrist was given a 5-year contract extension, with team options in both of the final two years of the contract.

Catcher Dioner Nivarro was given a two-game suspension on April 27 because of an on-field incident with umpire Dan Bellino that took place during a game on April 23. Navarro was ejected from that game by Bellino for arguing balls and strikes in the 6th inning, but before leaving the field, Navarro bumped chests with the umpire.

At the end of the month the Rays held the best record in the league at 17–6, and had a 1½ game lead in the division. The 17–6 record was the best in franchise history for the month of April, as well as the best April in league history since the New York Yankees went 21–6 in the 2003 season.

=== May ===
Dallas Braden of the Oakland Athletics pitched the 19th perfect game in major league history against the Rays on May 9, the second time in less than a year that the Rays had been on the losing end of perfection. The first occurred on July 23, 2009, when Mark Buehrle of the Chicago White Sox did not allow a single Rays batter to reach base, which was also the most recent perfect game pitched prior to Braden's. The Los Angeles Dodgers had been the only other franchise to be the losing team of consecutive perfect games pitched in the majors. No team who had a perfect game pitched against them had a higher winning percentage than the Rays did, who entered the game with a league-best 22–8 record.

On May 15, Pat Burrell was designated for assignment after another struggling start to the season. He would later clear waivers and become a free agent. The Rays called up Hank Blalock to replace him on the roster. Blalock's minor league contract included an out clause that his agent Scott Boras stated he would activate within the next week, which would force the Rays to either promote him or let him become a free agent. However Andrew Friedman, Executive Vice President of the Rays, said that this was not a factor in the decision to bring him up.

Having already missed the start of the season, relief pitcher J. P. Howell threw in a simulated game, but was forced to stop after only 12 pitches. After being examined by the Rays' head athletic trainer, manager Joe Maddon talked to reporters saying that Howell had a "definite setback." On May 19 it was announced that Howell underwent surgery on his left shoulder, and would miss the entire 2010 season.

Shortstop Jason Bartlett suffered a "mild" right hamstring strain during a game on May 29 as he attempted to field a ground ball hit into center field. He was reported as day-to-day, expected to miss at least the next game. A few days later it was revealed that there was a chance he would be placed on the disabled list, and on June 3, that was the decision made.

The Rays went 17–12 in May, improving their league-best record to 34–18, and held a 2½ game division lead.

=== June ===
Catcher Kelly Shoppach was brought up from his Triple-A rehab assignment on June 3.

In the 2010 MLB draft, the Rays used their first selection (17th overall) on Josh Sale, an outfielder out of Bishop Blanchet High School, located in Seattle, Washington. His signing was officially announced by the team on the morning of August 17.

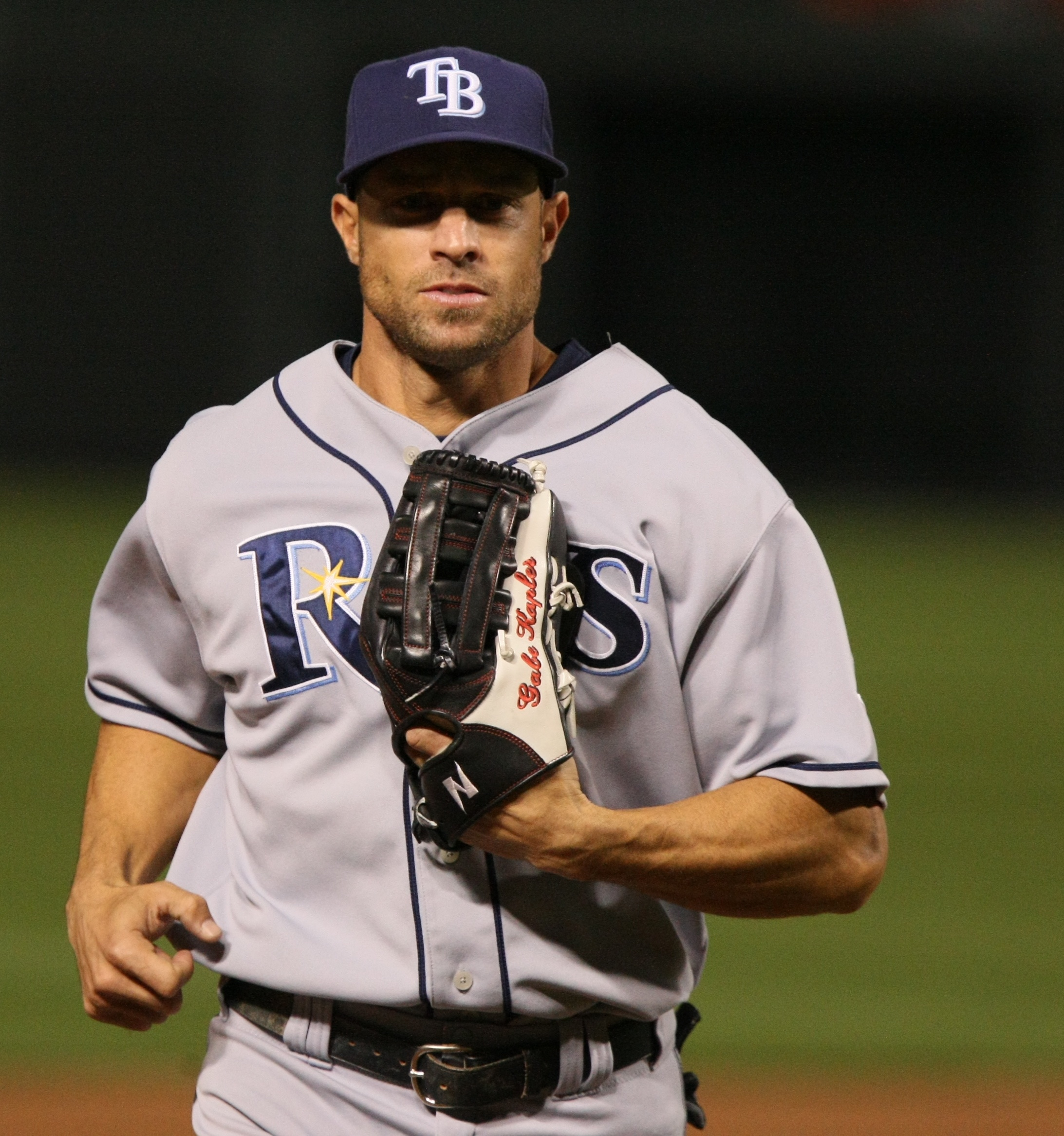
Gabe Kapler

Outfielder Gabe Kapler was put on the disabled list on June 12 for a hip flexor strain. Justin Ruggiano was called up to take the open spot on the roster. Ruggiano wouldn't stay long however, being sent back down when Jason Bartlett was activated from the disabled list on June 15.

On June 12, Carlos Peña hit a home run for the sixth consecutive game. This broke the team record for homers in consecutive games, set by Jose Canseco, who went deep in five straight games during the 1999 season. Peña's streak was snapped the next day, going hitless in four at-bats. Peña had been struggling throughout the season offensively, and some called for him to be benched as recently as the week prior.

Dioner Navarro was optioned to triple-A Durham on June 24. Left fielder Carl Crawford was removed from that day's game with soreness in his shoulder and reported as day-to-day, so outfielder Matt Joyce was called up to take the open spot on the roster.

On June 25, the Rays were once again unable to record a base hit in a game, this time in a 1–0 loss to the Arizona Diamondbacks. The pitcher who threw the no-hitter was Edwin Jackson, who spent four seasons with the Rays until being traded after the 2008 season. This was the third no-hitter pitched against the Rays in less than a year, however unlike the previous two, this was not a perfect game, as 10 batters reached base by virtue of a walk, error, or hit by pitch. The Rays became the first team to be no-hit twice in the same season since the San Diego Padres in 2001.

Once Gabe Kapler was able to be activated from the disabled list, the Rays needed to make a cut on June 29. Hank Blalock was chosen to be designated for assignment. Manager Joe Maddon praised Blalock for his work ethic, professionalism, and the impact he had in the clubhouse, but said there just weren't enough opportunities for him with the team.

In the month of June, the Rays went 11–14. Dropping to 45–32 overall at the end of the month, they entered July two games behind the division lead.

=== July ===
On July 4, three Rays were selected to play for the American League in the 2010 MLB All-Star Game on July 13. Left fielder Carl Crawford and third baseman Evan Longoria were both named starters by way of fan vote, while pitcher David Price was elected by the players. This was Crawford's fourth selection to the Midsummer Classic, Longoria's third, and Price's first. All three became the first Rays to be starting players in the All-Star Game. Price was named the starting pitcher for the American League the day before the game. Jose Canseco would have been the first in 1999, but missed out due to an injury. Longoria had the opportunity in 2009, but also had to withdraw due to an injury. Closer Rafael Soriano was added to the roster on July 6, his first-ever selection, giving the Rays four all-stars. Soriano replaced New York Yankees closer Mariano Rivera after it was announced that Rivera would not play because of injuries. Soriano was picked by having the next-highest total of votes on the players' ballot.

At the All-Star Break, the Rays had a 54–34 record, were second in the AL East, and two games behind first. They led the AL wild card race by three games.

Rocco Baldelli signed a minor-league contract with the Rays on July 19. There was speculation prior to the season that Baldelli would return to the Rays as a player when he returned to the organization as a "special assistant". His first game was on the same day of the signing, having been assigned to class-A Charlotte. He has been expected to spend several weeks in the minors before a possible call-up to the Rays.

On July 26, the Rays were the winning team in a no-hitter for a change, as Matt Garza threw the first no-hitter in team history in a 5–0 win over the Detroit Tigers at Tropicana Field in front of an announced crowd of 17,009. Throwing 120 pitches, Garza faced the minimum 27 batters, allowing only one to reach base on a walk in the second inning.

Posting a 19–7 record for the month of July, the Rays finished the month with an overall record of 64–39. Though they were two games behind for the division lead, they led the wild card by 5½ games.

=== August ===
Jeremy Hellickson, one of the Rays' best pitching prospects, made his major league debut on August 2 against the Minnesota Twins. He posted a 12–3 record and 2.45 ERA in triple-A before being called up. To make room for him on the roster, Andy Sonnanstine was placed on the 15-day disabled list, retroactive to July 23. In his debut, Hellickson pitched seven innings, allowing two runs on three hits and retired the first ten batters he faced, ending up as the winning pitcher. His stay in the majors lasted only that night however, as expected when it was first reported that he would make his first career start. Following the game, he was optioned back down to triple-A, in favor of position player Dan Johnson. In triple-A, Johnson was hitting .303 with 30 home runs and 95 RBIs.

First baseman Carlos Peña was placed on the disabled list on August 6, retroactive to August 1. On July 31, Peña was removed from a game with what was initially described as a foot injury and had not played since. The reason for his placement on the DL was reported as a partial tear of the plantar fascia ligament on the bottom of his foot. Relief pitcher Dale Thayer was recalled to fill the vacated roster spot.

David Price won his 15th game of the season on August 9, surpassing the franchise record for wins in a single season. The previous record of 14 wins was shared by Rolando Arrojo, James Shields and Edwin Jackson. Arrojo set the record in the club's inaugural season, while Shields and Jackson tied the record in 2008.

Starting pitchers Jeff Niemann and Wade Davis were both placed on the 15-day disabled list on August 9 for shoulder strains. The move allowed Jeremy Hellickson to be added back to the roster, as well as relief pitcher Mike Ekstrom.

Gabe Kapler was put on the disabled list with an ankle sprain on August 16. His spot on the roster was taken by Carlos Peña, who was eligible to come off the DL that same day.

On August 27, the Rays signed outfielder Brad Hawpe to a minor league contract and assigned him to class-A Charlotte. He was called up to the Rays on August 31, making him playoff eligible. To make room for him, pitcher Andy Sonnanstine was sent down to class-A Hudson Valley, though he will not have to remain there long, as a player can be recalled before the mandatory 10 days if the team's season ends before then, and Hudson Valley's season ends September 4.

At the end of August, the Rays were 81–51, having gone 17–12 during the month. They trailed the New York Yankees for the division lead by a single game, though the two teams had been tied for first place in each of the previous eight days. However the Rays were still in position to make the playoffs heading into the last full month of the regular season, leading the Boston Red Sox in the wild card by seven games.

=== September/October ===
On the first of September, Rocco Baldelli, Jeremy Hellickson, Desmond Jennings and Dioner Navarro were all called up as a result of roster expansions, with Dale Thayer being sent down. Also, relief pitcher Grant Balfour was activated from the disabled list that day.

Closer Rafael Soriano recorded his 44th save on September 24, setting a new franchise record for saves in a single season. The previous record was held by Roberto Hernández, who saved 43 games in 1999.

They Rays secured a playoff spot on September 28 after a 5–0 win at home against the Baltimore Orioles.

On the final day of the regular season, the AL East was still up for grabs with both the Rays and New York Yankees tied for first place. For the Rays to clinch the division, they needed either a win, or a loss by the Yankees. When all was said and done, both happened, as the Yankees lost to the Boston Red Sox prior to the Rays defeating the Kansas City Royals in extra innings. In September and October combined, the Rays split 30 games, going 15–15. They finished the regular season 96–66, winning the division by a single game, and finishing one win shy of their franchise record set in 2008. The Rays also had home field advantage through the American League side of the postseason.

=== Postseason ===
==== American League Division Series: vs. Texas Rangers ====
In the ALDS, the Rays faced the Texas Rangers. The Rangers finished the regular season with a 90–72 record, and won the AL West division championship to clinch their first postseason berth since 1999. In the regular season, the Rays were 4–2 against the Rangers.

The series opened at Tropicana Field for Game 1, with the Rays sending out 19-game winner David Price against Cliff Lee of the Rangers. The Rays put pressure on Lee in the 1st inning by loading the bases, but they would not plate a run after a controversial strikeout by Carlos Peña and another strikeout by Rocco Baldelli to end the inning. In the 2nd inning, the Rangers jumped out to a 2–0 lead after RBIs from Jeff Francoeur and Bengie Molina. In the 3rd and 4th innings, Price would yield solo home runs to Nelson Cruz and Molina, respectively, which put Texas up 4–0. The Rangers added to their lead in the 5th when Vladimir Guerrero doubled off the wall in center field, which scored Josh Hamilton from 2nd base to make it 5–0. The Rays got on the board in the 7th inning when Ben Zobrist hit a solo home run to right-center. However it would be the Rays' only run of the game, as the Rangers went on to win 5–1.

In Game 2, it was James Shields who got the start against C. J. Wilson. With runners on the corners in the 3rd inning, Shields went to 1st base for a pickoff attempt, but the throw over was errant, allowing the runner to score from 3rd base. Ian Kinsler launched a solo homer to left in the 4th, putting Texas up 2–0. In the 5th, Shields was removed from the game with two on and one out, being replaced by Chad Qualls to face Michael Young. With a 2–2 count, Young checked his swing on a pitch that was called a ball. The Rays appealed to first base umpire Jerry Meals, but Meals ruled that Young held up in time, drawing the ire of the Rays dugout. Replays showed that Young may not have checked in time, and had the ruling been made that he did not, it would have resulted in a strikeout. Instead, Young went deep to center on the very next pitch for a 3-run home run, putting the Rangers up 5–0. Rays manager Joe Maddon went out to the mound to talk to his pitcher after the home run, but began arguing with home plate umpire Jim Wolf about the check swing, which led to Wolf ejecting Maddon from the game. Texas added another run in the 6th inning, and held the Rays scoreless, winning 6–0 and taking a commanding 2–0 lead in the best-of-five series.

The series shifted to Texas at the Rangers Ballpark in Arlington for Game 3. It was a low-scoring affair for most of the game. Texas struck first when Mitch Moreland scored on a groundout in the 3rd inning. The Rays stranded two baserunners in both the 4th and 5th innings, but tied the game in the 6th inning after an RBI double by B. J. Upton. Ian Kinsler put the Rangers back ahead 2–1 with a solo shot to left field in the 7th. An RBI single by Carlos Peña in the 8th scored a run from 2nd base to even the score again, and after a walk, John Jaso singled to center, bringing Peña home and giving the Rays a 3–2 lead. Carl Crawford and Peña both had home runs in the 9th inning to give the Rays a more comfortable 6–2 lead. Despite giving up a solo homer to Nelson Cruz, Rays closer Rafael Soriano was effective in the bottom of the 9th, and the Rays staved off elimination with a 6–3 victory.

Offensively, in Game 4 the Rays picked up right where they left off the previous day. Carlos Peña tripled to left-center field in the 2nd inning, and scored on an error by Rangers' second baseman Ian Kinsler, who misplayed a pop fly beyond the infield. Evan Longoria, who was inactive for the last several games of the regular season, had a huge game, starting with a leadoff double in the 4th inning. The next batter was Peña, who hit a double of his own to the opposite field, bringing Longoria home and giving the Rays a 2–0 lead. Later in the inning, another double came off the bat of B. J. Upton, putting the Rays up 3–0. Rangers starter Tommy Hunter did not come out to pitch the 5th inning. Derek Holland was sent in for relief, but Tampa Bay added to their lead when Longoria blasted a 2-run homer to left, making it 5–0. Texas had the bases loaded in the bottom of the 5th, but Rays starter Wade Davis got Vladimir Guererro to swing and miss for a strikeout to end the threat. The Rangers did score in the 6th inning, as Nelson Cruz led off with a home run, and Mitch Moreland hit an RBI double with two outs off of Rays reliever Grant Balfour to make cut the Tampa Bay lead to three runs. It was the only scoring Texas would do in the game, as Rafael Soriano entered the game in the 9th inning and picked up the save. The Rays took the game 5–2 to force a decisive Game 5 back home at the Trop. In Game 5, however Cliff Lee was dominant. He outdueled David Price in a 5–2 victory to help the Rangers advance to their first ever American League Championship Series.

== Season standings ==
=== American League East ===
AL East
Team	W	L	Pct.	GB	Home	Road
Tampa Bay Rays	96	66	.593	—	49‍–‍32	47‍–‍34
New York Yankees	95	67	.586	1	52‍–‍29	43‍–‍38
Boston Red Sox	89	73	.549	7	46‍–‍35	43‍–‍38
Toronto Blue Jays	85	77	.525	11	45‍–‍33	40‍–‍44
Baltimore Orioles	66	96	.407	30	37‍–‍44	29‍–‍52

=== American League Wild Card ===
Division winners
Team	W	L	Pct.
Tampa Bay Rays	96	66	.593
Minnesota Twins	94	68	.580
Texas Rangers	90	72	.556

Wild Card team (Top team qualifies for postseason)
Team	W	L	Pct.	GB
New York Yankees	95	67	.586	—
Boston Red Sox	89	73	.549	6
Chicago White Sox	88	74	.543	7
Toronto Blue Jays	85	77	.525	10
Detroit Tigers	81	81	.500	14
Oakland Athletics	81	81	.500	14
Los Angeles Angels	80	82	.494	15
Cleveland Indians	69	93	.426	26
Kansas City Royals	67	95	.414	28
Baltimore Orioles	66	96	.407	29
Seattle Mariners	61	101	.377	34

=== Record vs. opponents ===
2010 American League record Source: MLB Standings Grid – 2010
Team	BAL	BOS	CWS	CLE	DET	KC	LAA	MIN	NYY	OAK	SEA	TB	TEX	TOR	NL
Baltimore	–	9–9	4–3	3–3	5–5	2–4	6–0	3–5	5–13	3–7	3–6	7–11	6–4	3–15	7–11
Boston	9–9	–	1–6	4–4	3–3	4–3	9–1	3–2	9–9	4–5	7–3	7–11	4–6	12–6	13–5
Chicago	3–4	6–1	–	9–9	8–10	10–8	7–2	5–13	2–4	4–5	9–1	3–4	4–5	3–5	15–3
Cleveland	3–3	4–4	9–9	–	9–9	10–8	5–4	6–12	2–6	3–6	3–4	2–7	2–4	6–4	5–13
Detroit	5–5	3–3	10–8	9–9	–	10–8	6–4	9–9	4–4	3–3	3–5	1–6	3–6	4–4	11–7
Kansas City	4–2	3-4	9–10	8–10	8–10	–	3-7	5–13	3–5	3–6	5–4	4–4	2–7	3–3	8–10
Los Angeles	0–6	1–9	2–7	4–5	4–6	7–3	–	2–5	4–4	11–8	15–4	4–5	9–10	6–3	11–7
Minnesota	5–3	2–3	13–5	12–6	9–9	13–5	5–2	–	2–4	6–3	6-4	3–5	7–3	3–6	8–10
New York	13–5	9–9	4–2	6-2	4–4	5–3	4–4	4–2	–	9–1	6–4	8–10	4–4	8–10	11–7
Oakland	7–3	5–4	5–4	6–3	3–3	6–3	8–11	3–6	1–9	–	13–6	4–5	9–10	3–4	8–10
Seattle	6–3	3–7	1–9	4–3	5–3	4–5	4–15	4–6	4–6	6–13	–	2–7	7–12	2–3	9–9
Tampa Bay	11–7	11–7	4–3	7–2	6–1	4–4	5–4	5–3	10–8	5–4	7–2	–	4–2	10–8	7–11
Texas	4–6	6–4	5–4	4–2	6–3	7–2	10-9	3-7	4-4	10-9	12–7	2–4	–	3–7	14–4
Toronto	15–3	6–12	5–3	4–6	4–4	3–3	3–6	6–3	10–8	4–3	3–2	8–10	7–3	–	7–11

- Source: MLB Standings Grid – 2010

== Game log ==
The Rays opened the 2010 season at home against the Baltimore Orioles, the first time since 2005 that they opened at Tropicana Field.

Legend
	Rays win
	Rays loss
	Postponement
**Bold**	Rays team member

=== Regular season ===
2010 game log
April (17–6)

#	Date	Opponent	Score	Win	Loss	Save	Attendance	Record
1	April 6	Orioles	4–3	**Soriano** (1–0)	Gonzalez (0–1)		36,973	1–0
2	April 7	Orioles	4–3	**Garza** (1–0)	Guthrie (0–1)	**Soriano** (1)	15,220	2–0
3	April 8	Orioles	4–5	Matusz (1–0)	**Ekstrom** (0–1)	González (1)	16,191	2–1
4	April 9	Yankees	9–3	**Price** (1–0)	Vázquez (0–1)		33,221	3–1
5	April 10	Yankees	0–10	Sabathia (1–0)	**Davis** (0–1)		29,892	3–2
6	April 11	Yankees	3–7	Burnett (1–0)	**Choate** (0–1)		31,253	3–3
7	April 12	@ Orioles	5–1	**Garza** (2–0)	Guthrie (0–2)		9,129	4–3
8	April 13	@ Orioles	8–6 (10)	**Cormier** (1–0)	Albers (0–1)	**Soriano** (2)	13,731	5–3
9	April 14	@ Orioles	9–1	**Price** (2–0)	Bergesen (0–1)		10,248	6–3
10	April 16	@ Red Sox	3–1 (12)	**Cormier** (2–0)	Delcarmen (0–1)	**Soriano** (3)	37,084	7–3
11	April 17	@ Red Sox	6–5	**Shields** (1–0)	Buchholz (1–1)	**Soriano** (4)	37,022	8–3
12	April 18	@ Red Sox	7–1	**Garza** (3–0)	Lester (0–2)		37,143	9–3
13	April 19	@ Red Sox	8–2	**Niemann** (1–0)	Lackey (1–1)		37,609	10–3
14	April 20	@ White Sox	1–4	Danks (2–0)	**Price** (2–1)	Jenks (3)	19,260	10–4
15	April 21	@ White Sox	12–0	**Davis** (1–1)	Buehrle (2–2)		17,023	11–4
16	April 22	@ White Sox	10–2	**Shields** (2–0)	Peavy (0–1)		18,207	12–4
17	April 23	Blue Jays	5–6	Cecil (1–0)	**Garza** (3–1)	Gregg (5)	22,056	12–5
18	April 24	Blue Jays	9–3	**Wheeler** (1–0)	Downs (0–2)		23,870	13–5
19	April 25	Blue Jays	6–0	**Price** (3–1)	Morrow (1–2)		23,250	14–5
20	April 27	Athletics	8–6	**Davis** (2–1)	Sheets (1–2)	**Soriano** (5)	10,825	15–5
21	April 28	Athletics	10–3	**Shields** (3–0)	Braden (3–1)		10,691	16–5
22	April 29	Royals	11–1	**Garza** (4–1)	Hochevar (2–1)		12,766	17–5
23	April 30	Royals	2–3	Rupe (1–1)	**Choate** (0–2)	Soria (6)	25,195	17–6

May (17–12)

#	Date	Opponent	Score	Win	Loss	Save	Attendance	Record
24	May 1	Royals	2–4 (11)	Tejada (2–2)	**Cormier** (2–1)	Soria (7)	34,813	17–7
25	May 2	Royals	1–0	**Davis** (3–1)	Greinke (0–3)	**Soriano** (6)	19,757	18–7
26	May 4	@ Mariners	5–2	**Shields** (4–0)	Vargas (2–2)	**Soriano** (7)	15,589	19–7
27	May 5	@ Mariners	8–3	**Garza** (5–1)	Lee (0–1)		14,627	20–7
28	May 6	@ Mariners	8–0	**Niemann** (2–0)	Rowland-Smith (0–2)		17,617	21–7
29	May 7	@ Athletics	4–1	**Price** (4–1)	Gonzalez (3–2)	**Soriano** (8)	19,193	22–7
30	May 8	@ Athletics	2–4	Sheets (2–3)	**Davis** (3–2)	Bailey (6)	15,493	22–8
31	May 9	@ Athletics	0–4	Braden (4–2)	**Shields** (4–1)		12,228	22–9
32	May 10	@ Angels	4–5 (11)	Bell (1–0)	**Balfour** (0–1)		36,798	22–10
33	May 11	@ Angels	7–2	**Niemann** (3–0)	Kazmir (2–3)		39,007	23–10
34	May 12	@ Angels	4–3	**Price** (5–1)	Weaver (4–2)	**Soriano** (9)	35,700	24–10
35	May 14	Mariners	3–4	Fister (3–1)	**Davis** (3–3)	Aardsma (9)	27,856	24–11
36	May 15	Mariners	3–2	**Soriano** (2–0)	Colomé (0–1)		23,267	25–11
37	May 16	Mariners	2–1	**Wheeler** (2–0)	Lee (1–2)	**Soriano** (10)	23,005	26–11
38	May 17	Indians	4–3 (11)	**Sonnanstine** (1–0)	Wright (1–2)		18,879	27–11
39	May 18	Indians	6–2	**Price** (6–1)	Huff (1–2)		17,093	28–11
40	May 19	@ Yankees	10–6	**Davis** (4–3)	Burnett (4–2)	**Benoit** (1)	43,283	29–11
41	May 20	@ Yankees	8–6	**Shields** (5–1)	Pettitte (5–1)	**Soriano** (11)	45,483	30–11
42	May 21	@ Astros	1–2	Myers (3–3)	**Garza** (5–2)	Lindstrom (10)	27,601	30–12
43	May 22	@ Astros	4–2	**Niemann** (4–0)	Rodríguez (2–6)	**Soriano** (12)	33,778	31–12
44	May 23	@ Astros	10–6	**Price** (7–1)	Moehler (0–1)	**Soriano** (13)	28,801	32–12
45	May 24	Red Sox	1–6	Buchholz (6–3)	**Davis** (4–4)		21,430	32–13
46	May 25	Red Sox	0–2	Lester (5–2)	**Shields** (5–2)	Papelbon (11)	24,310	32–14
47	May 26	Red Sox	3–11	Lackey (5–3)	**Garza** (5–3)		22,147	32–15
48	May 27	White Sox	5–1	**Niemann** (5–0)	Floyd (2–5)		13,299	33–15
49	May 28	White Sox	2–4	García (4–3)	**Price** (7–2)	**Thornton** (2)	20,650	33–16
50	May 29	White Sox	8–5	**Davis** (5–4)	Danks (4–4)	**Soriano** (14)	33,558	34–16
51	May 30	White Sox	5–8	Peavy (4–4)	**Shields** (5–3)		26,878	34–17
52	May 31	@ Blue Jays	2–3	Morrow (4–4)	**Garza** (5–4)	Gregg (14)	11,335	34–18

June (11–14)

#	Date	Opponent	Score	Win	Loss	Save	Attendance	Record
53	June 1	@ Blue Jays	7–6	**Balfour** (1–1)	Gregg (0–2)	**Soriano** (15)	13,439	35–18
54	June 2	@ Blue Jays	7–3	**Price** (8–2)	Marcum (5–2)		13,517	36–18
55	June 4	@ Rangers	6–9	Wilson (4–3)	**Davis** (5–5)	Feliz (15)	36,345	36–19
56	June 5	@ Rangers	1–5	Hunter (1–0)	**Shields** (5–4)		25,853	36–20
57	June 6	@ Rangers	9–5	**Garza** (6–4)	Harden (3–2)		26,932	37–20
58	June 8	Blue Jays	9–0	**Niemann** (6–0)	Tallet (1–2)		12,937	38–20
59	June 9	Blue Jays	10–1	**Price** (9–2)	Marcum (5–3)		15,886	39–20
60	June 10	Blue Jays	2–3	Cecil (7–2)	**Davis** (5–6)	Gregg (15)	13,675	39–21
61	June 11	Marlins	9–14	Sánchez (6–3)	**Shields** (5–5)		19,338	39–22
62	June 12	Marlins	6–5	**Garza** (7–4)	Nolasco (5–5)	**Soriano** (16)	29,963	40–22
63	June 13	Marlins	1–6	Volstad (4–6)	**Niemann** (6–1)		25,442	40–23
64	June 15	@ Braves	10–4	**Price** (10–2)	Kawakami (0–9)		30,448	41–23
65	June 16	@ Braves	2–6	Hanson (7–3)	**Davis** (5–7)		26,807	41–24
66	June 17	@ Braves	1–3	Hudson (7–2)	**Shields** (5–6)	Wagner (12)	30,427	41–25
67	June 18	@ Marlins	4–7	Robertson (5–5)	**Garza** (7–5)	Núñez (14)	17,310	41–26
68	June 19	@ Marlins	9–8 (11)	**Shields** (6–6)	Sosa (1–2)	**Sonnanstine** (1)	23,242	42–26
69	June 20	@ Marlins	1–4	Johnson (8–2)	**Price** (10–3)	Núñez (15)	15,374	42–27
70	June 22	Padres	1–2	Latos (8–4)	**Davis** (5–8)	Bell (18)	14,650	42–28
71	June 23	Padres	4–5	Gregerson (2–2)	**Shields** (6–7)	Bell (19)	15,809	42–29
72	June 24	Padres	5–3	**Garza** (8–5)	LeBlanc (4–5)	**Soriano** (17)	21,877	43–29
73	June 25	Diamondbacks	0–1	Jackson (5–6)	**Niemann** (6–2)		18,918	43–30
74	June 26	Diamondbacks	5–3	**Price** (11–3)	Kennedy (3–6)	**Soriano** (18)	23,945	44–30
75	June 27	Diamondbacks	1–2	López (4–6)	**Davis** (5–9)	Heilman (2)	25,442	44–31
76	June 29	@ Red Sox	5–8	Lackey (9–3)	**Shields** (6–8)	Papelbon (18)	28,103	44–32
77	June 30	@ Red Sox	9–4	**Garza** (9–5)	Matsuzaka (5–3)		38,055	45–32

July (19–7)

#	Date	Opponent	Score	Win	Loss	Save	Attendance	Record
78	July 1	@ Twins	5–4 (10)	**Cormier** (3–1)	Guerrier (1–3)	**Soriano** (19)	40,665	46–32
79	July 2	@ Twins	1–2	Baker (7–7)	**Price** (11–4)	Rauch (18)	39,266	46–33
80	July 3	@ Twins	8–6	**Choate** (1–2)	Guerrier (1–4)	**Soriano** (20)	40,852	47–33
81	July 4	@ Twins	7–4	**Shields** (7–8)	Blackburn (7–6)	**Soriano** (21)	40,328	48–33
82	July 5	Red Sox	6–5	**Choate** (2–2)	Ramírez (0–2)	**Soriano** (22)	28,528	49–33
83	July 6	Red Sox	3–2	**Niemann** (7–2)	Doubront (1–1)	**Soriano** (23)	19,902	50–33
84	July 7	Red Sox	6–4	**Price** (12–4)	Wakefield (3–7)	**Garza** (1)	24,356	51–33
85	July 8	Indians	5–2	**Davis** (6–9)	Westbrook (5–5)	**Wheeler** (1)	16,892	52–33
86	July 9	Indians	3–9	Carmona (8–7)	**Shields** (7–9)		23,116	52–34
87	July 10	Indians	4–0	**Garza** (10–5)	Laffey (1–3)		20,091	53–34
88	July 11	Indians	6–5 (10)	**Sonnanstine** (1–0)	Wood (1–4)		24,687	54–34
All-Star Break: NL defeats AL, 3–1
89	July 16	@ Yankees	5–4	Rivera (3–1)	**Choate** (2–3)		47,524	54–35
90	July 17	@ Yankees	10–5	**Niemann** (8–2)	Burnett (7–8)		48,957	55–35
91	July 18	@ Yankees	5–9	Park (2–1)	**Price** (12–5)		46,969	55–36
92	July 19	@ Orioles	8–1	**Davis** (7–9)	Tillman (1–4)		12,792	56–36
93	July 20	@ Orioles	10–11 (13)	Uehara (1–0)	**Cormier** (3–2)		16,623	56–37
94	July 21	@ Orioles	5–4	**Shields** (8–9)	Bergesen (3–8)	**Soriano** (24)	19,286	57–37
95	July 23	@ Indians	1–3 (7)	Carmona (10–7)	**Niemann** (8–3)	Sipp (1)	16,904	57–38
96	July 24	@ Indians	6–3	**Price** (13–5)	Talbot (8–9)	**Soriano** (25)	17,221	58–38
97	July 25	@ Indians	4–2	**Davis** (8–9)	Masterson (3–9)	**Soriano** (26)	13,410	59–38
98	July 26	Tigers	5–0	**Garza** (11–5)	Scherzer (7–8)		17,009	60–38
99	July 27	Tigers	3–2	**Shields** (9–9)	Verlander (12–6)	**Soriano** (27)	19,843	61–38
100	July 28	Tigers	7–4	**Niemann** (9–3)	Bonine (4–1)	**Soriano** (28)	16,209	62–38
101	July 29	Tigers	4–2	**Price** (14–5)	Porcello (4–9)	**Wheeler** (2)	26,716	63–38
102	July 30	Yankees	3–2	**Davis** (9–9)	Hughes (12–4)	**Soriano** (29)	36,973	64–38
103	July 31	Yankees	4–5	Robertson (2–3)	**Soriano** (2–1)	Rivera (22)	36,973	64–39

August (17–12)

#	Date	Opponent	Score	Win	Loss	Save	Attendance	Record
104	August 1	Yankees	3–0	**Shields** (10–9)	Sabathia (13–5)	**Soriano** (30)	36,973	65–39
105	August 2	Twins	4–2	**Hellickson** (1–0)	Pavano (13–7)	**Wheeler** (3)	17,689	66–39
106	August 3	Twins	6–4	**Niemann** (10–3)	Guerrier (1–6)	**Soriano** (31)	18,261	67–39
107	August 4	Twins	1–2 (13)	Guerrier (2–6)	**Cormier** (3–3)		19,172	67–40
108	August 5	Twins	6–8	Capps (4–3)	**Benoit** (0–1)		29,210	67–41
109	August 6	@ Blue Jays	1–2	Cecil (9–5)	**Garza** (11–6)	Gregg (25)	22,250	67–42
110	August 7	@ Blue Jays	11–17	Tallet (2–4)	**Shields** (10–10)		24,168	67–43
111	August 8	@ Blue Jays	0–1	Morrow (9–6)	**Sonnanstine** (2–1)		22,313	67–44
112	August 9	@ Tigers	6–3	**Price** (15–5)	Galarraga (3–5)	**Soriano** (32)	23,932	68–44
113	August 10	@ Tigers	8–0	**Hellickson** (2–0)	Scherzer (7–9)		26,114	69–44
114	August 11	@ Tigers	2–3	Verlander (13–7)	**Garza** (11–7)	Valverde (22)	28,815	69–45
115	August 13	Orioles	0–5	Guthrie (7–11)	**Shields** (10–11)		24,227	69–46
116	August 14	Orioles	7–3	**Sonnanstine** (3–1)	Matusz (4–12)		36,189	70–46
117	August 15	Orioles	3–2	**Hellickson** (3–0)	Arrieta (4–4)	**Soriano** (33)	29,654	71–46
118	August 16	Rangers	6–4	**Cormier** (4–3)	Lee (10–6)	**Soriano** (34)	18,319	72–46
119	August 17	Rangers	10–1	**Garza** (12–7)	Hunter (9–2)		18,156	73–46
120	August 18	Rangers	8–6	**Shields** (11–11)	Holland (2–2)	**Soriano** (35)	19,413	74–46
121	August 19	@ Athletics	3–4	Cahill (13–5)	**Wheeler** (2–1)	Blevins (1)	10,118	74–47
122	August 20	@ Athletics	4–5	Rodríguez (1–0)	**Benoit** (0–2)	Breslow (2)	13,207	74–48
123	August 21	@ Athletics	5–4	**Choate** (3–3)	Breslow (4–4)	**Soriano** (36)	16,202	75–48
124	August 22	@ Athletics	3–2	**Garza** (13–7)	Braden (8–9)	**Soriano** (37)	18,749	76–48
125	August 23	@ Angels	4–3	**Shields** (12–11)	Kazmir (8–11)	**Soriano** (38)	39,127	77–48
126	August 24	@ Angels	10–3	**Davis** (10–9)	Santana (13–9)		43,577	78–48
127	August 25	@ Angels	3–12	Haren (9–12)	**Niemann** (10–4)		37,009	78–49
128	August 27	Red Sox	1–3	Lester (14–8)	**Price** (15–6)	Papelbon (33)	29,461	78–50
129	August 28	Red Sox	3–2 (10)	**Choate** (4–3)	Atchison (2–2)		36,973	79–50
130	August 29	Red Sox	5–3	**Shields** (13–11)	Lackey (12–8)	**Soriano** (39)	23,438	80–50
131	August 30	Blue Jays	6–2	**Davis** (11–9)	Cecil (11–7)		11,968	81–50
132	August 31	Blue Jays	5–13	Romero (11–8)	**Niemann** (10–5)		12,972	81–51

September (13–14)

#	Date	Opponent	Score	Win	Loss	Save	Attendance	Record
133	September 1	Blue Jays	2–1	**Price** (16–6)	Camp (4–3)	**Soriano** (40)	14,859	82–51
134	September 3	@ Orioles	4–1	**Garza** (14–7)	Millwood (3–15)	**Soriano** (41)	13,507	83–51
135	September 4	@ Orioles	4–8	Guthrie (9–13)	**Shields** (13–11)		18,943	83–52
136	September 5	@ Orioles	7–8	Simón (4–2)	**Wheeler** (2–2)	Uehara (6)	28,268	83–53
137	September 6	@ Red Sox	5–12	Lester (16–8)	**Niemann** (10–6)		37,546	83–54
138	September 7	@ Red Sox	14–5	**Price** (17–6)	Matsuzaka (9–5)		37,290	84–54
139	September 8	@ Red Sox	5–11	Wakefield (4–10)	**Garza** (14–8)		37,757	84–55
140	September 10	@ Blue Jays	9–8	**Benoit** (1–2)	Gregg (1–5)	**Soriano** (42)	14,305	85–55
141	September 11	@ Blue Jays	13–1	**Davis** (12–9)	Romero (12–9)		17,632	86–55
142	September 12	@ Blue Jays	4–5	Gregg (2–5)	**Soriano** (2–2)		14,658	86–56
143	September 13	Yankees	1–0 (11)	**Balfour** (2–1)	Mitre (0–3)		26,907	87–56
144	September 14	Yankees	7–8 (10)	Robertson (3–3)	**Wheeler** (2–3)	Rivera (30)	28,713	87–57
145	September 15	Yankees	4–3	**Qualls** (2–4)	Hughes (16–8)	**Soriano** (43)	29,733	88–57
146	September 17	Angels	3–4	Kohn (1–0)	**Wheeler** (2–4)	Rodney (11)	23,215	88–58
147	September 18	Angels	4–3 (10)	**Soriano** (3–2)	Cassevah (0–2)		31,896	89–58
148	September 19	Angels	3–6	Kazmir (9–14)	**Niemann** (10–7)	Walden (1)	25,794	89–59
149	September 20	@ Yankees	6–8	Gaudin (1–4)	**Garza** (14–9)	Rivera (32)	47,437	89–60
150	September 21	@ Yankees	3–8	Hughes (17–8)	**Shields** (13–13)		46,609	89–61
151	September 22	@ Yankees	7–2	**Hellickson** (4–0)	Burnett (10–14)		46,986	90–61
152	September 23	@ Yankees	10–3	**Price** (18–6)	Sabathia (20–7)		47,646	91–61
153	September 24	Mariners	5–3	**Niemann** (11–7)	Vargas (9–12)	**Soriano** (44)	17,840	92–61
154	September 25	Mariners	9–1	**Garza** (15–9)	Fister (6–13)		26,427	93–61
155	September 26	Mariners	2–6	French (5–6)	**Shields** (13–14)		22,301	93–62
156	September 27	Orioles	0–4	Matusz (9–12)	**Davis** (12–10)		12,446	93–63
157	September 28	Orioles	5–0	**Price** (19–6)	Bergesen (8–11)		17,891	94–63
158	September 29	Orioles	0–2	Millwood (4–16)	**Niemann** (11–8)	Uehara (11)	36,973	94–64
159	September 30	@ Royals	2–3	Greinke (0–3)	**Garza** (15–10)	Soria (43)	21,563	94–65

October (2–1)

#	Date	Opponent	Score	Win	Loss	Save	Attendance	Record
160	October 1	@ Royals	0–7	Chen (12–7)	**Shields** (13–14)		23,374	94–66
161	October 2	@ Royals	4–0	**Qualls** (3–4)	Davies (8–12)		32,484	95–66
162	October 3	@ Royals	3–2 (12)	**Niemann** (12–8)	Hughes (1–3)	**Soriano** (44)	20,936	96–66

=== Postseason ===
2010 postseason game log
American League Division Series

Game	Date	Opponent	Score	Win	Loss	Save	Location/Attendance	Series
1	October 6	Rangers	1–5	Lee (1–0)	**Price** (0–1)		Tropicana Field; 35,474	0–1
2	October 7	Rangers	0–6	Wilson (1–0)	**Shields** (0–1)		Tropicana Field; 35,535	0–2
3	October 9	@ Rangers	6–3	**Benoit** (1–0)	Oliver (0–1)		Rangers Ballpark in Arlington; 51,746	1–2
4	October 10	@ Rangers	5–2	**Davis** (1–0)	Hunter (0–1)	Soriano (1)	Rangers Ballpark in Arlington; 49,218	2–2
5	October 12	Rangers	1–5	Lee (2–0)	**Price (0–2)**		Tropicana Field; 41,845	2–3

== Statistics ==
=== Regular season ===
Note: Team leaders in all categories are noted in bold.

- = League leader in category.

==== Batting ====
Note: G = Games played; AB = At bats; R = Runs scored; H = Hits; 2B = Doubles; 3B = Triples; HR = Home runs; RBI = Runs batted in; AVG = Batting average; SB = Stolen bases

Player	G	AB	R	H	2B	3B	HR	RBI	AVG	SB
Willy Aybar	100	270	22	62	13	0	6	43	.230	0
Rocco Baldelli	10	24	3	23	5	1	0	1	.208	1
Jason Bartlett	135	468	71	119	27	3	4	47	.254	11
Hank Blalock	26	63	8	16	3	0	1	7	.254	1
Reid Brignac	113	301	39	77	13	1	8	45	.256	3
Pat Burrell	24	84	9	17	5	0	2	13	.202	0
Carl Crawford	**154**	**600**	**110**	**184**	30	**13***	19	90	**.307**	**47**
Brad Hawpe	15	39	7	7	0	0	2	7	.179	0
John Jaso	109	339	57	89	18	3	5	44	.263	4
Desmond Jennings	17	21	5	4	1	1	0	2	.190	5
Dan Johnson	40	111	15	22	3	0	7	23	.198	1
Matt Joyce	77	216	30	52	15	3	10	40	.241	2
Gabe Kapler	59	124	19	16	4	0	2	14	.210	1
Evan Longoria	151	574	96	169	**46**	5	22	**104**	.294	15
Dioner Navarro	48	124	11	24	5	0	1	7	.194	0
Carlos Peña	144	484	64	95	18	0	**28**	84	.196	5
Sean Rodriguez	118	343	53	86	19	2	9	40	.251	13
Kelly Shoppach	63	158	17	31	18	0	5	17	.196	0
B. J. Upton	**154**	536	89	127	38	4	18	62	.237	42
Ben Zobrist	151	541	77	129	28	2	10	75	.238	24
Pitcher totals	162	19	0	2	0	0	0	0	.105	0
**Team totals**	**162**	**5439**	**802**	**1343**	**295**	**37**	**160**	**769**	**.247**	**172**

Source: ESPN.com

==== Pitching ====
Note: W = Wins; L = Losses; ERA = Earned run average; G = Games pitched; GS = Games started; SV = Saves; IP = Innings pitched; H = Hits allowed; R = Runs allowed; ER = Earned runs allowed; BB = Walks allowed; K = Strikeouts

Player	W	L	ERA	G	GS	SV	IP	H	R	ER	BB	K
Grant Balfour	2	1	2.28	57	0	0	55.1	43	16	14	17	56
Joaquín Benoit	1	2	1.34	63	0	1	60.1	30	10	9	11	75
Randy Choate	4	3	4.23	**85***	0	0	44.2	41	23	21	17	40
Lance Cormier	4	3	3.92	60	0	0	62.0	68	28	27	34	30
Wade Davis	12	10	4.07	29	29	0	168.0	165	77	76	62	113
Mike Ekstrom	0	1	3.31	15	0	0	16.1	12	6	6	9	10
Matt Garza	15	10	3.91	33	32	1	204.2	193	94	89	63	150
Jeremy Hellickson	4	0	3.47	10	4	0	36.1	32	14	14	8	33
Jake McGee	0	0	1.80	8	0	0	5.0	2	1	1	3	6
Jeff Niemann	12	8	4.39	30	29	0	174.1	159	86	85	61	131
David Price	**19**	6	**2.72**	32	31	0	**208.2**	170	71	63	**79**	**188**
Chad Qualls	2	0	5.57	27	0	0	21.0	24	15	13	6	15
James Shields	13	**15**	5.18	34	**33**	0	203.1	**246***	**128**	**117***	51	187
Andy Sonnanstine	3	1	4.44	41	4	1	81.0	83	40	40	27	50
Rafael Soriano	3	2	1.73	64	0	**45***	62.1	36	14	12	14	57
Dale Thayer	0	0	27.00	1	0	0	2.0	7	6	6	0	2
Dan Wheeler	2	4	3.35	64	0	3	38.1	36	20	18	16	46
**Team totals**	**96**	**66**	**3.78**	**162**	**162**	**51**	**1453.2**	**1347**	**649**	**611**	**478**	**1189**

Source: ESPN.com

=== Roster ===
2010 Tampa Bay Rays
**Roster**
**Pitchers**: 50 Grant Balfour; 53 Joaquín Benoit; 36 Randy Choate; 31 Lance Cormier; 40 Wade Davis; 54 Mike Ekstrom; 22 Matt Garza; 58 Jeremy Hellickson; 57 Jake McGee; 34 Jeff Niemann; 14 David Price; 55 Chad Qualls; 33 James Shields; 21 Andy Sonnanstine; 29 Rafael Soriano; 59 Dale Thayer; 35 Dan Wheeler	**Catchers**: 28 John Jaso; 30 Dioner Navarro; 10 Kelly Shoppach; **Infielders**: 16 Willy Aybar; 8 Jason Bartlett; 9 Hank Blalock; 15 Reid Brignac; 24 Dan Johnson; 3 Evan Longoria; 23 Carlos Peña; 1 Sean Rodriguez	**Outfielders**: 5 Rocco Baldelli; 13 Carl Crawford; 11 Brad Hawpe; 27 Desmond Jennings; 20 Matt Joyce; 19 Gabe Kapler; 2 B. J. Upton; 18 Ben Zobrist; **Other batters**: 5 Pat Burrell	**Manager**: 70 Joe Maddon; **Coaches**: 46 Stan Boroski; 6 Tom Foley (third base); 25 George Hendrick (first base); 48 Jim Hickey (pitching); 4 Dave Martinez (bench); 7 Bobby Ramos (bullpen); 17 Derek Shelton (hitting); 62 Don Zimmer (coach)

== Farm system ==
Level	Team	League	Manager
AAA	Durham Bulls	International League	Charlie Montoyo
AA	Montgomery Biscuits	Southern League	Billy Gardner Jr.
A	Charlotte Stone Crabs	Florida State League	Jim Morrison
A	Bowling Green Hot Rods	Midwest League	Brady Williams
A-Short Season	Hudson Valley Renegades	New York–Penn League	Jared Sandberg
Rookie	Princeton Rays	Appalachian League	Mike Johns
Rookie	GCL Rays	Gulf Coast League	Joe Alvarez
