= 2010 Boston Red Sox season =

Major League Baseball season

2010 Boston Red Sox
- League: American League
- Division: East
- Ballpark: Fenway Park
- City: Boston, Massachusetts
- Record: 89–73 (.549)
- Divisional place: 3rd
- Owners: John W. Henry (New England Sports Ventures)
- President: Larry Lucchino
- General manager: Theo Epstein
- Manager: Terry Francona
- Television: NESN (Don Orsillo, Jerry Remy, Heidi Watney)
- Radio: Boston Red Sox Radio Network (Joe Castiglione, Dave O'Brien, Jon Rish, Dale Arnold)
- Stats: ESPN.com; Baseball Reference

The 2010 Boston Red Sox season was the 110th season in the franchise's Major League Baseball history. With a record of 89–73 the Red Sox finished third in the American League East, seven games behind the Tampa Bay Rays. The team failed to advance to the postseason for the first time since 2006.

The Red Sox opened and closed the season at Fenway Park against the New York Yankees The last time the team had opened and closed a season at home against the Yankees was 1950.

== Off season ==
=== November ===
On November 5, 2009, the day after the Red Sox-rival Yankees clinched their 27th title, Boston declared numerous players free agents. Among these free agents were: left-fielder Jason Bay, left-handed relief pitcher Billy Wagner, and productive bench-outfielder Rocco Baldelli. On the same day, Boston traded pitchers Hunter Jones and Jose Alvarez to the Florida Marlins for a young outfielder named Jeremy Hermida. Many questioned the move, since Hermida's career has been far below the speculated potential he was drafted in the 1st round (11th overall) in the 2002 Major League Baseball draft. Contrary to popular opinion, Epstein supported Hermida saying, "We still think there's a good hitter in there ... Jeremy is a player who hasn't fulfilled his potential yet. We were able to acquire him at a reasonable cost to see if he can fulfill that potential with us."

We still think there's a good hitter in there ... Jeremy [Hermida] is a player who hasn't fulfilled his potential yet. We were able to acquire him at a reasonable cost to see if he can fulfill that potential with us

— Theo Epstein

Days later, on November 9, Boston resigned two key players in the 2009 campaign. Catcher/first baseman Victor Martínez, who was brought to Boston in a block-buster trade at the trade deadline from the Cleveland Indians for pitchers Justin Masterson, Nick Hagadone and Bryan Price, had a $7.1 million option picked up after hitting .336 with 8 HR and 41 RBI in 56 games during 2009. "We're going to really look for Victor to be an everyday catcher for us next year. We feel like that puts us in the best position to win with Victor catching as much as he can. The other spot we'll have available is for more of a traditional backup. We'll see what Tek's decision is before we move forward", Epstein told Boston reporters at the General Managers' Meeting in Chicago.

Boston also signed veteran knuckle-baller Tim Wakefield to a two-year deal worth $10 million. Before the All-Star break, Wakefield was tied for the American League lead in wins with 11 and was selected to his first All-Star game. (However, he did not pitch as part of the 2009 American League All-Star Manager Joe Maddon's decision.) Unfortunately, Wakefield did not get an opportunity to finish his season the same way as injuries kept him to just four starts after the All-Star Break. "He wants to end his career in a Red Sox uniform, which is something we would like to see as well. For us, the finances made a lot of sense", Epstein told reporters at the GM Meeting in Chicago on the same day. On the same day, Boston declined team options on C Jason Varitek and SS Álex González, only to have Varitek exercise his own $3 million option to remain with the Red Sox for the 14th straight season two days later, keeping his "captain" status.

=== December ===
Ever since the 2004 departure of former Red Sox star-shortstop Nomar Garciaparra at the trade deadline, the Red Sox have witnessed an array of shortstops brought in to stop the bleeding. On December 4, the Red Sox inked former Toronto Blue Jays SS Marco Scutaro to a two-year, $11 million contract, with a dual option for 2012 worth $6 million if the Red Sox pick it up, and $3 million if Scutaro picks it up. "We were looking to upgrade at shortstop. We were pretty clear about that going into the winter. Right from the start, we identified Marco as the best free agent and a guy who would be the best fit for this ballclub. It was a process of doing our due diligence and making sure we understood the whole landscape of the position through trades and free agency and then doing more due diligence on Marco", remarked Theo Epstein regarding the signing. Scutaro had a break-out season with Toronto in 2009, batting .282, scoring 100 runs, belting 12 homers, and producing a .379 OBP as the leadoff hitter.

Right from the start, we identified Marco [Scutaro] as the best free agent and a guy who would be the best fit for this ballclub.

— Theo Epstein

On December 9, Boston made a move for the bettering of their bullpen, which had lost both Takashi Saito and Billy Wagner to free agency signings by the Atlanta Braves (who picked up both relievers), and acquired reliever Ramón A. Ramírez from the Tampa Bay Rays. Ramírez had pitched for the Cincinnati Reds from 2008 to 2009, compiling a 1–1 record with a 2.97 ERA, striking out 29 in 39.1 innings over the two seasons. The next day, Boston traded minor-league pitcher Chris Province to the Minnesota Twins for starter/reliever Boof Bonser. Bonser pitched for the Twins from 2006 to 2008 before undergoing season-ending right shoulder surgery in the spring of 2009, compiling an 18–25 record with a sub-par 5.12 ERA, striking out 317 in 391.2 innings and 60 starts.

The following week, on December 16, 2009, Boston made a double-headed offseason splash that eclipsed the Scutaro signing the previous month. Boston announced that they had come to terms with former Los Angeles Angels of Anaheim starter John Lackey and former Milwaukee Brewers center-fielder Mike Cameron.

Lackey was inked to a five-year pact worth a reported $82.5 million, sealing his future with the Sox through 2014. For his career, Lackey has a record of 102–71 with a 3.81 ERA (1201 K/1501.1 IP/1.31 WHIP). His best season was 2007, where he went 19–9 with a 3.01 and made the All-Star Team. He also finished 3rd in the Cy Young Award voting for the American League the same year. The addition of Lackey creates arguably the strongest "big three" atop any rotation in the Major Leagues. With aces Josh Beckett and Jon Lester already manning the 1–2 slam, Lackey provides the 3-hole punch that can likely compete with that of American League East division rival Yankees, consisting of ace CC Sabathia, former Blue Jay ace A. J. Burnett, and long-time Yankee playoff star Andy Pettitte.

Cameron was signed to a two-year deal worth between $15 and $16 million, signing him for the 2010 and 2011 seasons. Cameron has hit .250 with 265 HR, 926 RBI, .340 OBP, and a .448 SLUG% in his impressive 1,829 Major League career games. He has eclipsed 20 home runs in eight different seasons, while playing for the Chicago White Sox, Cincinnati Reds, Seattle Mariners, New York Mets, San Diego Padres and, of course, the Brewers.

On December 29, it was made official that Boston would not be bringing back left-field slugger Jason Bay as the New York Mets signed him to a four-year deal worth $66 million, which signs him from 2010–2013. There is also a fifth-year vesting option worth $17 million, with a $3 million buyout. The option becomes guaranteed if Bay reaches 600 plate appearances in 2013, or 500 plate appearances in both 2012 and 2013. The deal also includes a full no-trade clause, $8.5 million signing bonus, $6.5 million in 2010, and $16 million in each of the final three guaranteed seasons. In his only full season with the Red Sox, he notched a .267 average, hitting 36 HR and 119 RBI (both career highs) and earning the first Silver Slugger Award of his career.

=== January ===
To continue the Boston front office’s 2009–10 offseason, Theo Epstein added former Seattle Mariner and Los Angeles Dodger, third-baseman Adrián Beltré, to the Bay-less 2010 roster. Signing a one-year deal worth $9 million, with a $5 million player option for 2011, which would increase to $10 million if Beltre makes 640 plate appearances in 2010, the Red Sox bought themselves an additional half-season to determine the future of third-baseman Mike Lowell, the Red Sox hot-corner man since coming from the Florida Marlins club in 2006, along with starting ace Josh Beckett, in exchange for now super-star shortstop Hanley Ramírez. Beltre had a very down year with Seattle in 2009, hitting only .265 with 8 HR and 44 RBI in 111 games and 477 at-bats, a performance severely hindered by left shoulder woes. For his career, Beltre has hit .270 with 250 HR and 906 RBI.

Speculation arose, however, concerning the intellectuality of this move, as many had questioned Beltre's offensive capabilities, and those of the Red Sox themselves, stating that the loss of Jason Bay would hurt the club, who have won at least 95 games in all but one of Terry Francona's seasons as manager. In response to this, Theo Epstein stated, "I think Adrian's reputation is that he's one of best defenders in the game, period, let alone one of the best defensive third baseman. He's got all the attributes you look for in a third baseman. He's got quickness, he's got great hands. His feet are tremendous. Great arm and very quick release. He has that signature play coming in on balls, which he does better than maybe anyone in the history of the game. He attacks the baseball. He's really a weapon defensively, and we're looking forward to having him help our run prevention. But as Adrian said, he's not just just a defender. He has the ability to be a very well-rounded player and, in fact, a leader on the team. We look forward to having him help our club win in all phases of the game this year."

...[Adrián Beltré]'s not just just a defender. He has the ability to be a very well-rounded player and, in fact, a leader on the team. We look forward to having him help our club win in all phases of the game this year.

— Theo Epstein

The Beltre signing occurred on January 8. One day prior, the Red Sox acquired another Mariner infielder/outfielder Bill Hall via trade in exchange for poorly-performing first-baseman/outfielder Casey Kotchman, filling a hole at first base for Seattle, who have declined to re-sign first-baseman slugger Russell Branyan. Boston will also receive an undisclosed Minor League player to be named later, and cash considerations. Hall will likely be used as a bench player who can give almost anyone a day off when necessary, and if Hall finds his form, Boston may even consider using him to make yet another blockbuster deal at the trade deadline this season, or even in the next offseason. The 30-year-old struggled immensely at the dish in 2009, hitting a microscopic .201 with 8 HR and 36 RBI in 334 at-bats. The Mariners are paying the better part of Hall's 2010 salary, and the rest is being sent to the Red Sox in the form of cash considerations.

During the last three weeks of January, Boston avoided arbitration hearings with five players by signing them to contracts, keeping alive Epstein's streak of never going to arbitration with any player during his tenure with the Red Sox.

On January 14, he first signed Japanese setup man Hideki Okajima to a one-year deal worth $2.75 million, with bonus clauses taking effect after 55 games, 60 games, 65 games and 70 games, each clause worth an additional $50,000. In his three-year career with Boston, the 34-year-old veteran is 12–4 with six saves, a 2.72 ERA, 192 IP, and 172 K, while showing remarkable consistency, making at least 60 appearances each season.

Just five days later, the Red Sox signed All-Star closer Jonathan Papelbon to a one-year, $9.35 million pact, a $3 million update from the $6.25 million he made in 2009. Papelbon, 29, has been to the Major League Baseball All-Star Game all four years he has been in the big leagues. He is Boston's all-time saves leader with 151, and his career is highlighted by stats like 268 appearances, 1.84 ERA, 346 K, 298 IP, .198 BAA, and a 10.45K/9 IP ratio. On this day, Boston also avoided arbitration with key relievers in Manny Delcarmen and Ramón S. Ramírez.

And, to top off Epstein's 8-year streak, the Red Sox signed Jeremy Hermida, whom the Sox acquired just a month earlier, to the tune of one-year and $3.345 million. The left-handed hitter is projected as a back-up to the Boston outfield, composed of Jacoby Ellsbury, Mike Cameron and J. D. Drew, but is happy nonetheless.

== Spring training ==
On February 10, 2010, fans gathered at Fenway Park to kick off the Red Sox preseason by celebrating Truck Day. The first full team workout of the preseason took place on February 24, 2010. Playing other teams in the Grapefruit League, the Red Sox had 17 wins, 14 losses, and 1 tie during spring training.

== 2010 season ==
General manager Theo Epstein set the tone for the regular season by characterizing it as a "bridge year", referring to the next wave of key talent that will be ready to take the field in 2011 and 2012. For the 2010 season, Epstein brought in new additions: Marco Scutaro, Adrián Beltré, Mike Cameron and John Lackey.

Over the course of the season, 19 players spent 24 stints on the disabled list. Starter players Jacoby Ellsbury, Dustin Pedroia and Kevin Youkilis suffered season ending injuries. Due to the abundance of injuries, a number of players within the system emerged to have increased visibility on the team. Altogether, the Red Sox used 53 players in 2010, six of whom made their major league debut in 2010.

=== Opening Day ===
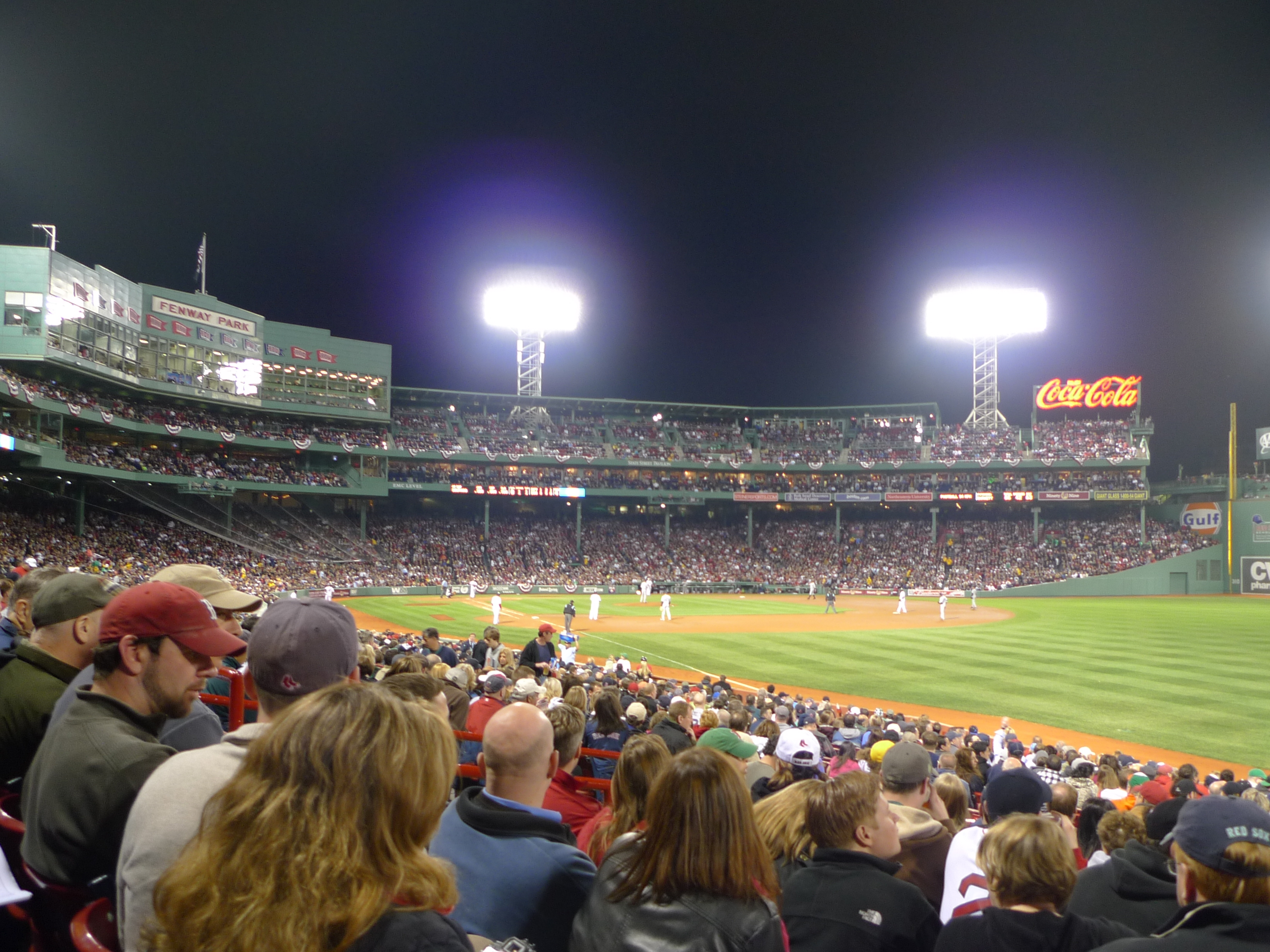
Red Sox play the Yankees in the season opener

The Red Sox kicked off their 2010 regular season on April 4 at home against the New York Yankees. Trailing the Yankees for most of the game, the Sox began to make a comeback when Jorge Posada made two consecutive errors and Kevin Youkillis crossed home plate, pulling the Sox ahead. The final score was Red Sox 9, Yankees 7.

==== Lineup ====
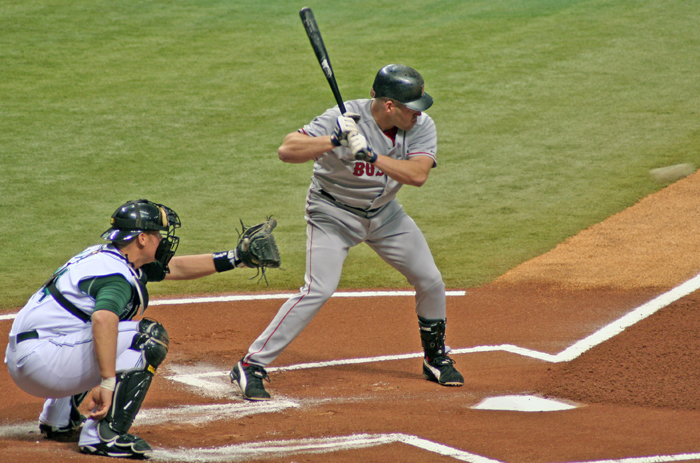
Cleanup hitter Kevin Youkilis

2	Jacoby Ellsbury	LF
15	Dustin Pedroia	2B
41	Víctor Martínez	C
20	Kevin Youkilis	1B
34	David Ortiz	DH
29	Adrián Beltré	3B
7	J. D. Drew	RF
23	Mike Cameron	CF
16	Marco Scutaro	SS
19	Josh Beckett	P

=== 2010 roster ===
2010 Boston Red Sox
Roster
Pitchers: 48 Scott Atchison; 51 Daniel Bard; 19 Josh Beckett; 30 Boof Bonser; 64 Michael Bowden; 11 Clay Buchholz; 53 Fernando Cabrera; 68 Robert Coello; 17 Manny Delcarmen; 61 Félix Doubront; 43 Matt Fox; 53 Rich Hill; 40 John Lackey; 31 Jon Lester; 59 Robert Manuel; 18 Daisuke Matsuzaka; 46 Joe Nelson; 37 Hideki Okajima; 58 Jonathan Papelbon; 56 Ramón S. Ramírez; 62 Dustin Richardson; 60 Scott Schoeneweis; 49 Tim Wakefield	Catchers: 68 Dusty Brown; 36 Kevin Cash; 41 Víctor Martínez; 44 Gustavo Molina; 39 Jarrod Saltalamacchia; 33 Jason Varitek; Infielders: 44 Lars Anderson; 29 Adrián Beltré; 32 Felipe López; 25 Mike Lowell; 12 Jed Lowrie; 56 Yamaico Navarro; 34 David Ortiz; 15 Dustin Pedroia; 13 Niuman Romero; 13 Ángel Sánchez; 16 Marco Scutaro; 30 Ryan Shealy; 20 Kevin Youkilis	Outfielders: 23 Mike Cameron; 7 J. D. Drew; 2 Jacoby Ellsbury; 22 Bill Hall; 32 Jeremy Hermida; 55 Ryan Kalish; 54 Darnell McDonald; 60 Daniel Nava; 3 Eric Patterson; 39,46 Josh Reddick; 44 Jonathan Van Every	Manager: 47 Terry Francona; Coaches: 10 Tim Bogar (third base); 52 John Farrell (pitching); 35 DeMarlo Hale (bench); 50 Ron Johnson (first base); 77 Rob Leary (first base); 28 Dave Magadan (hitting); 57 Gary Tuck (bullpen)

=== Season standings ===
==== American League East ====
AL East
Team	W	L	Pct.	GB	Home	Road
Tampa Bay Rays	96	66	.593	—	49‍–‍32	47‍–‍34
New York Yankees	95	67	.586	1	52‍–‍29	43‍–‍38
Boston Red Sox	89	73	.549	7	46‍–‍35	43‍–‍38
Toronto Blue Jays	85	77	.525	11	45‍–‍33	40‍–‍44
Baltimore Orioles	66	96	.407	30	37‍–‍44	29‍–‍52

==== American League Wild Card ====
Division winners
Team	W	L	Pct.
Tampa Bay Rays	96	66	.593
Minnesota Twins	94	68	.580
Texas Rangers	90	72	.556

Wild Card team (Top team qualifies for postseason)
Team	W	L	Pct.	GB
New York Yankees	95	67	.586	—
Boston Red Sox	89	73	.549	6
Chicago White Sox	88	74	.543	7
Toronto Blue Jays	85	77	.525	10
Detroit Tigers	81	81	.500	14
Oakland Athletics	81	81	.500	14
Los Angeles Angels of Anaheim	80	82	.494	15
Cleveland Indians	69	93	.426	26
Kansas City Royals	67	95	.414	28
Baltimore Orioles	66	96	.407	29
Seattle Mariners	61	101	.377	34

==== Record vs. opponents ====
2010 American League record Source: MLB Standings Grid – 2010
Team	BAL	BOS	CWS	CLE	DET	KC	LAA	MIN	NYY	OAK	SEA	TB	TEX	TOR	NL
Baltimore	–	9–9	4–3	3–3	5–5	2–4	6–0	3–5	5–13	3–7	3–6	7–11	6–4	3–15	7–11
Boston	9–9	–	1–6	4–4	3–3	4–3	9–1	3–2	9–9	4–5	7–3	7–11	4–6	12–6	13–5
Chicago	3–4	6–1	–	9–9	8–10	10–8	7–2	5–13	2–4	4–5	9–1	3–4	4–5	3–5	15–3
Cleveland	3–3	4–4	9–9	–	9–9	10–8	5–4	6–12	2–6	3–6	3–4	2–7	2–4	6–4	5–13
Detroit	5–5	3–3	10–8	9–9	–	10–8	6–4	9–9	4–4	3–3	3–5	1–6	3–6	4–4	11–7
Kansas City	4–2	3-4	9–10	8–10	8–10	–	3-7	5–13	3–5	3–6	5–4	4–4	2–7	3–3	8–10
Los Angeles	0–6	1–9	2–7	4–5	4–6	7–3	–	2–5	4–4	11–8	15–4	4–5	9–10	6–3	11–7
Minnesota	5–3	2–3	13–5	12–6	9–9	13–5	5–2	–	2–4	6–3	6-4	3–5	7–3	3–6	8–10
New York	13–5	9–9	4–2	6-2	4–4	5–3	4–4	4–2	–	9–1	6–4	8–10	4–4	8–10	11–7
Oakland	7–3	5–4	5–4	6–3	3–3	6–3	8–11	3–6	1–9	–	13–6	4–5	9–10	3–4	8–10
Seattle	6–3	3–7	1–9	4–3	5–3	4–5	4–15	4–6	4–6	6–13	–	2–7	7–12	2–3	9–9
Tampa Bay	11–7	11–7	4–3	7–2	6–1	4–4	5–4	5–3	10–8	5–4	7–2	–	4–2	10–8	7–11
Texas	4–6	6–4	5–4	4–2	6–3	7–2	10-9	3-7	4-4	10-9	12–7	2–4	–	3–7	14–4
Toronto	15–3	6–12	5–3	4–6	4–4	3–3	3–6	6–3	10–8	4–3	3–2	8–10	7–3	–	7–11

- Source: MLB Standings Grid – 2010

Red Sox vs. National League
Team	NL West					
Team	ARI	COL	LAD	SDP	SFG	PHI
Boston	3–0	1–2	3–0	—	2–1	4–2

=== Detailed record ===
Team	Home	Away	Total	Pct.	Gms Left
AL East
Baltimore Orioles	5–4	4–5	9–9	.500	–
New York Yankees	4–5	5–4	9–9	.500	–
Tampa Bay Rays	3–6	4–5	7–11	.389	–
Toronto Blue Jays	5–4	7–2	12–6	.667	–
	16–19	19–16	35–35	.500	–
AL Central
Chicago White Sox	0–3	1–3	1–6	.143	–
Cleveland Indians	2–2	2–2	4–4	.500	–
Detroit Tigers	2–1	1–2	3-3	.500	–
Kansas City Royals	2–2	2–1	4–3	.571	–
Minnesota Twins	2–0	1–2	3–2	.600	–
	8–8	7–10	15–18	.455	–
AL West
Los Angeles Angels	6–1	3–0	9–1	.900	–
Oakland Athletics	2–1	2–4	4–5	.444	–
Seattle Mariners	2–1	5–2	7–3	.700	–
Texas Rangers	3–4	1–2	4–6	.400	–
	13–7	11–8	24–15	.615	–
NL West
Arizona Diamondbacks	3–0	N/A	3–0	1.000	–
Colorado Rockies	N/A	1–2	1–2	.333	–
Los Angeles Dodgers	3–0	N/A	3–0	1.000	–
San Diego Padres	N/A	N/A	N/A	N/A	N/A
San Francisco Giants	N/A	2–1	2–1	.667	–
	6–0	3–3	9–3	.750	–
NL East
Atlanta Braves	N/A	N/A	N/A	N/A	N/A
Florida Marlins	N/A	N/A	N/A	N/A	N/A
New York Mets	N/A	N/A	N/A	N/A	N/A
Philadelphia Phillies	2–1	2–1	4–2	.667	–
Washington Nationals	N/A	N/A	N/A	N/A	N/A
	2–1	2–1	4–2	.667	–

Month	Games	Won	Lost	Pct.
April	23	11	12	.478
May	29	18	11	.621
June	27	18	9	.667
July	25	12	13	.480
August	28	15	13	.536
September	27	13	14	.481
October	3	2	1	.667
	162	89	73	.549

=== Game log ===
Legend
Red Sox win	Red Sox loss	Game postponed

2010 game log
April (11–12)

#	Date	Opponent	Score	Win	Loss	Save	Attendance	Record	Boxscore
1	April 4	Yankees	9–7	Okajima (1–0)	Park (0–1)	Papelbon (1)	37,440	1–0	
2	April 6	Yankees	4–6	Aceves (1–0)	Okajima (1–1)	Rivera (1)	38,000	1–1	
3	April 7	Yankees	1–3 (10)	Park (1–1)	Papelbon (0–1)	Rivera (2)	38,238	1–2	
4	April 9	@ Royals	3–4	Parrish (1–0)	Bard (0–1)	Soria (1)	21,091	1–3	
5	April 10	@ Royals	3–8	Beckett (1–0)	Greinke (0–1)		37,505	2–3	
6	April 11	@ Royals	6–8	Buchholz (1–0)	Meche (0–1)	Papelbon (2)	19,240	3–3	
7	April 12	@ Twins	2–5	Pavano (2–0)	Lester (0–1)	Rauch (5)	38,145	3–4	
8	April 14	@ Twins	6–3	Lackey (1–0)	Slowey (1–1)	Papelbon (3)	38,164	4–4	
9	April 15	@ Twins	0–8	Liriano (1–0)	Wakefield (0–1)		38,341	4–5	
10	April 16¹	Rays	1–3 (12)	Cormier (2–0)	Delcarmen (0–1)	Soriano (3)	37,084	4–6	
11	April 17	Rays	5–6	Shields (1–0)	Buchholz (1–1)	Soriano (4)	37,022	4–7	
12	April 18	Rays	1–7	Garza (3–0)	Lester (0–2)		37,143	4–8	
13	April 19	Rays	2–8	Niemann (1–0)	Lackey (1–1)		37,609	4–9	
14	April 20	Rangers	7–6	Papelbon (1–1)	Franscisco (2–3)		37,614	5–9	
15	April 21	Rangers	8–7 (12)	Okajima (2–1)	Nippert (2–0)		37,518	6–9	
16	April 22	Rangers	0–3	Wilson (1–1)	Buchholz (1–2)	Oliver (1)	37,417	6–10	
17	April 23	Orioles	4–3	Delcarmen (1–1)	Albers (0–2)	Papelbon (4)	37,367	7–10	
18	April 24	Orioles	7–6	Lackey (2–1)	Albers (0–3)	Papelbon (5)	38,017	8–10	
19	April 25	Orioles	6–7 (10)	Johnson (0–1)	Atchinson (0–1)	Meredith (1)	37,102	8–11	
20	April 26	@ Blue Jays	13–12	Schoeneweis (1–0)	Camp (1–1)	Papelbon (6)	13,847	9–11	
21	April 27	@ Blue Jays	2–1	Buchholz (2–2)	Downs (0–3)	R. S. Ramírez (1)	14,776	10–11	
22	April 28	@ Blue Jays	2–0	Lester (1–2)	Cecil (1–1)	Papelbon (6)	15,276	11–11	
23	April 30	@ Orioles	4–5 (10)	Albers (1–3)	R. S. Ramírez (0–1)		30,668	11–12	
¹: match suspended by rain at 1–1 in the ninth inning. Continuation and end of the game April 17.

May (18–11)

#	Date	Opponent	Score	Win	Loss	Save	Attendance	Record	Boxscore
24	May 1	@ Orioles	9–12	Bergesen (1–2)	Matsuzaka (0–1)	Simón (2)	35,164	11–13	
25	May 2	@ Orioles	2–3 (10)	Albers (2–3)	Papelbon (1–2)		34,255	11–14	
26	May 3	Angels	17–8	Buchholz (3–2)	Saunders (1–5)		37,404	12–14	
27	May 4	Angels	5–1	Lester (2–2)	Jepsen (0–1)		37,411	13–14	
28	May 5	Angels	3–1	Lackey (3–1)	Piñeiro (2–4)	Papelbon (8)	37,601	14–14	
29	May 6	Angels	11–6	Matsuzaka (1–1)	Kazmir (2–2)		37,639	15–14	
30	May 7	Yankees	3–10	Hughes (4–0)	Beckett (1–1)		37,898	15–15	
31	May 8	Yankees	3–14	Aceves (3–0)	Buchholz (3–3)		37,138	15–16	
32	May 9	Yankees	9–3	Lester (3–2)	Burnett (4–1)		37,618	16–16	
33	May 10	Blue Jays	7–6	Lackey (4–1)	Morrow (2–3)	Papelbon (9)	37,332	17–16	
34	May 11	Blue Jays	6–1	Matsuzaka (2–1)	Eveland (3–2)		37,609	18–16	
35	May 12	Blue Jays	2–3	Marcum (2–1)	Wakefield (0–2)	Gregg (10)	37,198	18–17	
36	May 14	@ Tigers	7–2	Buchholz (4–3)	Scherzer (1–4)		31,732	19–17	
37	May 15	@ Tigers	6–7 (12)	Valverde (1–1)	Delcarmen (1–2)		40,742	19–18	
38	May 16	@ Tigers	1–5	Galarraga (1–0)	Lackey (4–2)		35,454	19–19	
39	May 17	@ Yankees	9–11	Vázquez (2–4)	Papelbon (1–3)		48,271	19–20	
40	May 18	@ Yankees	7–6	Bard (1–1)	Rivera (0–1)	Papelbon (10)	47,734	20–20	
41	May 19	Twins	3–2	Buchholz (5–3)	Baker (4–4)	Bard (1)	37,426	21–20	
42	May 20	Twins	6–2	Lester (4–2)	Liriano (4–3)		38,144	22–20	
43	May 21	@ Phillies	1–5	Hamels (5–2)	Lackey (4–3)	Romero (2)	45,341	22–21	
44	May 22	@ Phillies	5–0	Matsuzaka (3–1)	Kendrick (2–2)		45,310	23–21	
45	May 23	@ Phillies	8–3	Wakefield (1–2)	Halladay (6–3)		45,068	24–21	
46	May 24	@ Rays	6–1	Buchholz (6–3)	Davis (4–4)		21,430	25–21	
47	May 25	@ Rays	2–0	Lester (5–2)	Shields (5–2)	Papelbon (11)	24,310	26–21	
48	May 26	@ Rays	11–3	Lackey (5–3)	Garza (5–3)		22,147	27–21	
49	May 27	Royals	3–4	Bannister (4–3)	Matsuzaka (3–2)	Soria (1)	37,940	27–22	
50	May 28	Royals	5–12	Davies (4–3)	Wakefield (1–3)		37,945	27–23	
51	May 29	Royals	1–0	Buchholz (7–3)	Greinke (1–6)	Papelbon (12)	37,956	28–23	
52	May 30	Royals	8–1	Lester (6–2)	Thompson (0–4)		37,581	29–23	

June (18–9)

#	Date	Opponent	Score	Win	Loss	Save	Attendance	Record	Boxscore
53	June 1	Athletics	9–4	Lackey (6–3)	Ross (1–4)		37,337	30–23	
54	June 2	Athletics	6–4	Matsuzaka (4–2)	Sheets (2–4)	Papelbon (13)	37,783	31–23	
55	June 3	Athletics	8–9	Mazzaro (1–0)	Wakefield (1–4)	Bailey (12)	37,386	31–24	
56	June 4	@ Orioles	11–0	Buchholz (8–3)	Tillman (0–1)		30,070	32–24	
57	June 5	@ Orioles	8–2	Lester (7–2)	Guthrie (3–6)		40,001	33–24	
58	June 6	@ Orioles	3–4 (11)	Hernandez (2–5)	Okajima (2–2)		27,774	33–25	
59	June 7	@ Indians	4–1	Matsuzaka (5–2)	Carmona (4–5)		14,758	34–25	
60	June 8	@ Indians	3–2	Wakefield (2–4)	Huff (2–7)	Bard (2)	15,462	35–25	
61	June 9	@ Indians	0–11	Masterson (2–5)	Buchholz (8–4)		14,022	35–26	
62	June 10	@ Indians	7–8	Wood (1–2)	Bard (1–2)		20,446	35–27	
63	June 11	Phillies	12–2	Lackey (7–3)	Moyer (6–6)		38,021	36–27	
64	June 12	Phillies	10–2	Delcarmen (2–2)	Blanton (1–5)		37,061	37–27	
65	June 13	Phillies	3–5	Hamels (6–5)	Wakefield (2–5)	Lidge (4)	37,230	37–28	
66	June 15	Diamondbacks	6–3	Buchholz (9–4)	Kennedy (3–4)	Papelbon (14)	37,459	38–28	
67	June 16	Diamondbacks	6–2	Lester (8–2)	Lopez (2–6)	Papelbon (15)	37,542	39–28	
68	June 17	Diamondbacks	8–5	Lackey (8–3)	Haren (7–5)		37,544	40–28	
69	June 18	Dodgers	10–6	Doubront (1–0)	Monasterios (3–2)	Bard (3)	37,723	41–28	
70	June 19	Dodgers	5–4	Papelbon (2–3)	Belisario (1–1)		37,454	42–28	
71	June 20	Dodgers	2–0	Buchholz (10–4)	Kuroda (6–5)	Papelbon (16)	37,430	43–28	
72	June 22	@ Rockies	1–2	Chacín (4–6)	Lester (8–3)	Belisle (1)	48,112	43–29	
73	June 23	@ Rockies	6–8	Corpas (2–4)	Papelbon (2–4)		48,243	43–30	
74	June 24	@ Rockies	13–11 (10)	Papelbon (3–4)	Street (0–1)		48,582	44–30	
75	June 25	@ Giants	4–5	Sánchez (6–5)	Wakefield (2–6)	Wilson (21)	41,182	44–31	
76	June 26	@ Giants	4–2	Atchinson (1–1)	Bumgarner (0–1)	Papelbon (17)	42,178	45–31	
77	June 27	@ Giants	5–1	Lester (9–3)	Lincecum (8–3)		41,528	46–31	
78	June 29	Rays	8–5	Lackey (9–3)	Shields (6–8)	Papelbon (18)	38,013	47–31	
79	June 30	Rays	4–9	Garza (9–5)	Matsuzaka (5–3)		38,055	47–32	

July (12–13)

#	Date	Opponent	Score	Win	Loss	Save	Attendance	Record	Boxscore
80	July 2	Orioles	3–2	Wakefield (3–6)	Bergesen (3–5)	Papelbon (19)	38,067	48–32	
81	July 3	Orioles	9–3	Lester (10–3)	Guthrie (3–10)		38,106	49–32	
82	July 4	Orioles	1–6	Matusz (3–9)	Lackey (9–4)		37,742	49–33	
83	July 5	@ Rays	5–6	Choate (2–2)	R. S. Ramírez (0–2)	Soriano (22)	28,528	49–34	
84	July 6	@ Rays	2–3	Niemann (7–2)	Doubront (1–1)	Soriano (23)	19,902	49–35	
85	July 7	@ Rays	4–6	Price (12–4)	Wakefield (3–7)	Garza (1)	24,356	49–36	
86	July 9	@ Blue Jays	14–3	Lester (11–3)	Romero (6–6)		27,567	50–36	
87	July 10	@ Blue Jays	5–9	Camp (3–1)	Lackey (9–5)	Gregg (20)	35,037	50–37	
88	July 11	@ Blue Jays	3–2	Matsuzaka (6–3)	Litsch (0–4)	Papelbon (20)	26,062	51–37	
All-Star Break: NL def. AL at Angel Stadium of Anaheim, 3–1
89	July 15	Rangers	2–7	Hunter (6–0)	Wakefield (3–8)		38,062	51–38	
90	July 16	Rangers	4–8	Lewis (9–5)	Doubront (1–2)		37,669	51–39	
91	July 17	Rangers	3–2 (11)	Delcarmen (3–2)	Ogando (3–1)		37,744	52–39	
92	July 18	Rangers	2–4	Wilson (8–5)	Lester (11–4)	Feliz (24)	37,431	52–40	
93	July 19	@ Athletics	2–1	Matsuzaka (7–3)	Sheets (4–9)	Papelbon (21)	19,341	53–40	
94	July 20	@ Athletics	4–5 (10)	Bailey (1–3)	R. S. Ramírez (0–3)		20,271	53–41	
95	July 21	@ Athletics	4–6	Gonzalez (9–6)	Buchholz (10–5)	Wuertz (2)	30,456	53–42	
96	July 22	@ Mariners	8–6 (13)	Okajima (3–2)	Olson (0–3)	R. S. Ramírez (2)	28,074	54–42	
97	July 23	@ Mariners	2–1	Atchinson (2–1)	Vargas (6–5)	Papelbon (22)	34,932	55–42	
98	July 24	@ Mariners	1–5	Seddon (1–0)	Lester (11–5)	Olson (1)	43,694	55–43	
99	July 25	@ Mariners	2–4	League (8–6)	Okajima (3–3)	Aardsma (18)	40,001	55–44	
100	July 26	@ Angels	6–3	Buchholz (11–5)	Haren (7–9)	Papelbon (23)	40,364	56–44	
101	July 27	@ Angels	4–2	Lackey (10–5)	Weaver (9–7)	Papelbon (24)	40,120	57–44	
102	July 28	@ Angels	7–3	Beckett (2–1)	Rodney (4–1)		44,052	58–44	
103	July 30	Tigers	5–6	Weinhardt (1–1)	Lester (11–6)		37,832	58–45	
104	July 31	Tigers	5–4	Okajima (4–3)	Coke (6–2)		37,498	59–45	

August (15–13)

#	Date	Opponent	Score	Win	Loss	Save	Attendance	Record	Boxscore
105	August 1	Tigers	4–3	Papelbon (4–4)	Thomas (4–1)		37,479	60–45	
106	August 2	Indians	5–6	Carmona (11–8)	Lackey (10–6)	Perez (13)	37,931	60–46	
107	August 3	Indians	3–1	Beckett (3–1)	Huff (2–10)	Papelbon (25)	37,714	61–46	
108	August 4	Indians	1–9	Masterson (4–10)	Lester (11–7)		37,902	61–47	
109	August 5	Indians	6–2	Matsuzaka (8–3)	Tomlin (1–1)	Papelbon (26)	38,102	62–47	
110	August 6	@ Yankees	6–3	Buchholz (12–5)	Vázquez (9–8)	Papelbon (27)	49,555	63–47	
111	August 7	@ Yankees	2–5	Sabathia (14–5)	Lackey (10–7)	Rivera (23)	49,716	63–48	
112	August 8	@ Yankees	2–7	Moseley (2–1)	Beckett (3–2)		49,096	63–49	
113	August 9	@ Yankees	2–1	Lester (12–7)	Hughes (13–5)	Papelbon (28)	49,476	64–49	
114	August 10	@ Blue Jays	7–5	Doubront (2–2)	Camp (3–2)	Papelbon (29)	27,690	65–49	
115	August 11	@ Blue Jays	10–1	Buchholz (13–5)	Marcum (10–6)		28,308	66–49	
116	August 12	@ Blue Jays	5–6	Gregg (1–4)	Papelbon (4–5)		36,271	66–50	
117	August 13	@ Rangers	9–10	O'Day (4–2)	Wakefield (3–9)		47,195	66–51	
118	August 14	@ Rangers	3–1	Lester (13–7)	Lewis (9–9)	Doubront (1)	48,030	67–51	
119	August 15	@ Rangers	3–7	Wilson (11–5)	Matsuzaka (8–4)		30,252	67–52	
120	August 17	Angels	6–0	Buchholz (14–5)	Weaver (11–8)		38,304	68–52	
121	August 18	Angels	7–5	Lackey (11–7)	Jepsen (2–3)	Papelbon (30)	37,779	69–52	
122	August 19	Angels	2–7	Santana (13–8)	Beckett (3–3)		37,641	69–53	
123	August 20	Blue Jays	2–16	Cecil (10–6)	Lester (13–8)		37,726	69–54	
124	August 21	Blue Jays	5–4 (11)	Papelbon (5–5)	Janssen (4–2)		37,614	70–54	
125	August 22	Blue Jays	5–0	Buchholz (15–5)	Marcum (11–7)	Doubront (2)	37,506	71–54	
126	August 23	Mariners	6–3	Lackey (12–7)	Fister (4–9)	Papelbon (31)	37,133	72–54	
	August 24	Mariners	Postponed: rain						
127	August 25	Mariners	5–3	Beckett (4–3)	Pauley (2–5)	Papelbon (32)	37,183	73–54	
128	August 25	Mariners	2–4	Hernández (10–10)	Wakefield (3–10)	League (4)	37,451	73–55	
129	August 27	@ Rays	3–1	Lester (14–8)	Price (15–6)	Papelbon (33)	29,461	74–55	
130	August 28	@ Rays	2–3 (10)	Choate (4–3)	Atchinson (2–2)		36,973	74–56	
131	August 29	@ Rays	3–5	Shields (13–11)	Lackey (12–8)	Soriano (39)	23,438	74–57	
132	August 31	@ Orioles	2–5	Matusz (7–12)	Beckett (4–4)	Uehara (5)	18,247	74–58	

September (13–14)

#	Date	Opponent	Score	Win	Loss	Save	Attendance	Record	Boxscore
133	September 1	@ Orioles	9–6	Lester (15–8)	Hendrickson (1–5)	Papelbon (34)	16,210	75–58	
134	September 2	@ Orioles	6–4	Matsuzaka (9–4)	Bergesen (6–10)	Papelbon (35)	26,954	76–58	
	September 3	White Sox	Postponed: rain						
135	September 4	White Sox	1–3	Danks (13–9)	Buchholz (15–6)	Jenks (26)	37,411	76–59	
136	September 4	White Sox	1–3	Floyd (10–11)	Lackey (12–9)	Jenks (27)	37,858	76–60	
137	September 5	White Sox	5–7	Linebrink (3–1)	Papelbon (5–6)	Thornton (6)	37,570	76–61	
138	September 6	Rays	12–5	Lester (16–8)	Niemann (10–6)		37,546	77–61	
139	September 7	Rays	5–14	Price (17–6)	Matsuzaka (9–5)		37,290	77–62	
140	September 8	Rays	11–5	Wakefield (4–10)	Garza (14–8)		37,757	78–62	
141	September 10	@ Athletics	0–5	Cahill (16–6)	Buchholz (15–7)		19,139	78–63	
142	September 11	@ Athletics	3–4	Anderson (5–6)	Lackey (12–10)	Bailey (23)	22,932	78–64	
143	September 12	@ Athletics	5–3	Beckett (5–4)	Braden (9–12)	Papelbon (36)	19,806	79–64	
144	September 13	@ Mariners	5–1	Lester (17–8)	Fister (5–12)		19,063	80–64	
145	September 14	@ Mariners	9–6	Hill (1–0)	League (9–7)		18,381	81–64	
146	September 15	@ Mariners	5–1	Buchholz (16–7)	Pauley (2–8)		21,936	82–64	
147	September 17	Blue Jays	9–11	Cecil (13–7)	Lackey (12–11)	Gregg (32)	37,679	82–65	
148	September 18	Blue Jays	3–4	Romero (13–9)	Beckett (5–5)	Gregg (33)	37,863	82–66	
149	September 19	Blue Jays	6–0	Lester (18–8)	Marcum (12–8)		37,234	83–66	
150	September 20	Orioles	2–4	Hernandez (8–8)	Matsuzaka (9–5)	Uehara (10)	37,560	83–67	
151	September 21	Orioles	1–9	Bergesen (8–10)	Atchinson (2–3)		37,464	83–68	
152	September 22	Orioles	6–1	Lackey (13–11)	Millwood (3–16)		37,729	84–68	
153	September 24	@ Yankees	10–8	Beckett (6–5)	Pettitte (11–3)	Papelbon (37)	49,457	85–68	
154	September 25	@ Yankees	7–3	Lester (19–8)	Nova (1–1)		49,558	86–68	
155	September 26	@ Yankees	3–4 (10)	Logan (2–0)	Okajima (4–4)		49,199	86–69	
156	September 27	@ White Sox	6–1	Buchholz (17–7)	Buehrle (12–13)		19,750	87–69	
157	September 28	@ White Sox	4–5	Sale (2–1)	Bowden (0–1)		16,982	87–70	
158	September 29	@ White Sox	2–5	García (12–6)	Beckett (6–6)	Thornton (8)	32,084	87–71	
159	September 30	@ White Sox	2–8	Danks (15–11)	Lester (19–9)		30,854	87–72	

October (2–1)

#	Date	Opponent	Score	Win	Loss	Save	Attendance	Record	Boxscore
160	October 1	Yankees	Postponed: rain						
160	October 2	Yankees	5–6 (10)	Hughes (18–8)	Papelbon (5–7)		37,467	87–73	
161	October 2	Yankees	7–6 (10)	Manuel (1–0)	Nova (1–2)		37,589	88–73	
162	October 3	Yankees	8–4	Lackey (14–11)	Moseley (4–4)		37,453	89–73	

=== Players stats ===
==== Batting ====
Note: G = Games played; AB = At bats; R = Runs scored; H = Hits; 2B = Doubles; 3B = Triples; HR = Home runs; RBI = Runs batted in; BB = Bases on balls; SO = Strikeouts; SB = Stolen bases; AVG = Batting average

Player	G	AB	R	H	2B	3B	HR	RBI	BB	SO	SB	AVG
Lars Anderson	18	35	4	7	1	0	0	4	7	8	0	.200
Aaron Bates	0	0	0	0	0	0	0	2	0	0	0	.333
Adrian Beltre	154	589	84	189	49	2	28	102	40	82	2	.321
Dusty Brown	7	12	0	3	1	0	0	2	0	2	0	.250
Mike Cameron	48	162	24	42	11	0	4	15	14	44	0	.259
Kevin Cash	29	60	1	8	1	0	0	1	6	16	0	.133
J. D. Drew	139	478	69	122	24	2	22	68	60	105	3	.255
Jacoby Ellsbury	18	78	10	15	4	0	0	5	4	9	7	.192
Bill Hall	119	344	44	85	16	1	18	46	34	104	9	.247
Jeremy Hermida	52	158	14	32	8	0	5	27	12	45	1	.203
Tug Hulett	0	0	0	0	0	0	0	0	0	0	0	.000
José Iglesias	0	0	0	0	0	0	0	0	0	0	0	.000
Ryan Kalish	53	163	26	41	11	1	4	24	12	38	10	.252
Felipe López	4	15	2	4	0	0	1	1	1	4	0	.267
Mike Lowell	73	218	23	52	13	0	5	26	23	34	0	.239
Jed Lowrie	55	171	31	49	14	0	9	24	25	25	1	.287
Darnell McDonald	117	319	40	86	18	3	9	34	30	85	9	.270
Victor Martínez	127	493	64	149	32	1	20	79	40	52	1	.302
Gustavo Molina	4	7	1	1	0	0	0	0	0	2	0	.143
Daniel Nava	60	161	23	39	14	1	1	26	19	46	1	.242
Yamaico Navarro	20	42	4	6	0	0	0	5	2	17	0	.143
David Ortiz	145	518	86	140	36	1	32	102	82	145	0	.270
Eric Patterson	90	187	26	40	8	5	6	16	14	62	5	.214
Dustin Pedroia	75	302	53	87	24	1	12	41	37	38	9	.288
Josh Reddick	29	62	5	12	3	1	1	5	1	15	1	.194
Niuman Romero	2	4	1	0	0	0	0	0	0	0	0	.000
Jarrod Saltalamacchia	12	24	2	4	3	0	0	2	6	5	0	.167
Ángel Sánchez	1	3	0	0	0	0	0	0	0	0	0	.000
Marco Scutaro	150	632	92	174	38	0	11	56	53	71	5	.275
Ryan Shealy	5	7	0	0	0	0	0	0	0	2	0	.000
Jonathan Van Every	21	19	6	4	1	0	1	1	2	9	0	.211
Jason Varitek	39	112	18	26	6	0	7	16	10	35	0	.232
Mark Wagner	0	0	0	0	0	0	0	0	0	0	0	.000
Kevin Youkilis	102	362	77	111	26	5	19	62	58	67	4	.307
Non-Pitcher Totals	162	5629	817	1506	357	22	211	780	585	1135	68	.268

==== Pitchers batting ====
Player	G	AB	R	H	2B	3B	HR	RBI	BB	SO	SB	AVG
Scott Atchison	2	0	0	0	0	0	0	0	0	0	0	.000
Daniel Bard	4	0	0	0	0	0	0	0	0	0	0	.000
Clay Buchholz	1	1	0	1	0	0	0	0	0	0	0	1.000
Manny Delcarmen	4	0	0	0	0	0	0	0	0	0	0	.000
John Lackey	3	5	1	2	1	0	0	0	0	1	0	.400
Jon Lester	2	3	0	0	0	0	0	1	1	2	0	.000
Daisuke Matsuzaka	2	4	0	2	0	0	0	1	0	0	0	.500
Joe Nelson	1	0	0	0	0	0	0	0	0	0	0	.000
Hideki Okajima	3	0	0	0	0	0	0	0	0	0	0	.000
Jonathan Papelbon	3	0	0	0	0	0	0	0	0	0	0	.000
Ramón S. Ramírez	5	0	0	0	0	0	0	0	0	0	0	.000
Dustin Richardson	1	0	0	0	0	0	0	0	0	0	0	.000
Tim Wakefield	2	4	0	0	0	0	0	0	1	2	0	.000
Pitcher Totals	9	17	1	5	1	0	0	2	2	5	0	.294

- Source: « Boston Red Sox batting stats »

==== Pitching ====
Note: W = Wins; L = Losses; ERA = Earned run average; G = Games pitched; GS = Games started; SV=Saves; SVO = Save Opportunities; IP = Innings pitched; H = Hits allowed; R = Runs allowed; ER = Earned runs allowed; HR= Home runs allowed; BB = Walks allowed; SO = Strikeouts

Player	W	L	ERA	G	GS	SV	SVO	IP	H	R	ER	HR	BB	SO
Scott Atchison	2	3	4.50	43	1	0	0	60.0	58	37	30	9	19	41
Daniel Bard	1	2	1.93	73	0	3	10	74.2	45	18	16	6	30	76
Josh Beckett	6	6	5.78	21	21	0	0	127.2	151	89	82	20	45	116
Boof Bonser	0	0	18.00	2	0	0	0	2.0	6	4	4	0	2	0
Michael Bowden	0	1	4.70	14	0	0	0	15.1	20	8	8	2	4	13
Clay Buchholz	17	7	2.33	28	28	0	0	173.2	142	55	45	9	67	120
Fernando Cabrera	0	0	20.25	1	0	0	0	1.1	2	3	3	1	2	0
Robert Coello	0	0	4.76	6	0	0	0	5.2	4	3	3	0	5	5
Manny Delcarmen	3	2	4.70	48	0	0	2	44.0	33	24	23	7	28	32
Felix Doubront	2	2	4.32	12	3	2	3	25.0	27	16	12	3	10	23
Bill Hall	0	0	0.00	1	0	0	0	1.0	0	0	0	0	0	0
Rich Hill	1	0	0.00	6	0	0	0	4.0	5	0	0	0	1	3
Matt Fox	0	0	4.91	4	1	0	0	7.1	8	4	4	0	2	0
John Lackey	14	11	4.40	33	33	0	0	215.0	233	114	105	18	72	156
Jon Lester	19	9	3.25	32	32	0	0	208.0	167	81	75	14	83	225
Robert Manuel	1	0	4.26	10	0	0	0	12.2	10	6	6	5	7	5
Daisuke Matsuzaka	9	6	4.69	25	25	0	0	153.2	137	84	80	13	74	133
Joe Nelson	0	0	9.72	8	0	0	0	8.1	14	9	9	2	6	9
Hideki Okajima	4	4	4.50	56	0	0	4	46.0	59	24	23	6	20	33
Jonathan Papelbon	5	7	3.90	65	0	37	45	67.0	57	34	29	7	28	76
Ramón S. Ramírez	0	3	4.46	44	0	2	2	42.1	39	21	21	6	16	31
Dustin Richardson	0	0	4.15	26	0	0	0	13.0	15	6	6	2	14	12
Scott Schoeneweis	1	0	7.90	15	0	0	0	13.2	19	12	12	2	10	13
Jonathan Van Every	0	0	18.00	1	0	0	0	1.0	2	2	2	1	0	1
Tim Wakefield	4	10	5.34	32	19	0	0	140.0	153	92	83	19	36	84
Team totals	89	73	4.20	162	162	44	66	1456.2.	1402	744	679	152	580	1207

- Source: « Boston Red Sox pitching stats »

== Awards and honors ==
- Adrián Beltré – Silver Slugger Award (3B)
- Clay Buchholz – AL Pitcher of the Month (August)
- Jon Lester – AL Pitcher of the Month (May)
- David Ortiz – AL Player of the Month (May)

All-Star Game

- Adrián Beltré, reserve 3B
- Clay Buchholz, reserve P
- Jon Lester, reserve P
- Víctor Martínez, reserve C
- David Ortiz, reserve DH
- Dustin Pedroia, reserve 2B

== Farm system ==
Level	Team	League	Manager
AAA	Pawtucket Red Sox	International League	Torey Lovullo
AA	Portland Sea Dogs	Eastern League	Arnie Beyeler
A-Advanced	Salem Red Sox	Carolina League	Kevin Boles
A	Greenville Drive	South Atlantic League	Billy McMillon
A-Short Season	Lowell Spinners	New York–Penn League	Bruce Crabbe
Rookie	GCL Red Sox	Gulf Coast League	Dave Tomlin
Rookie	DSL Red Sox	Dominican Summer League	José Zapata
