= Mike Ekstrom =

American baseball player (born 1983)

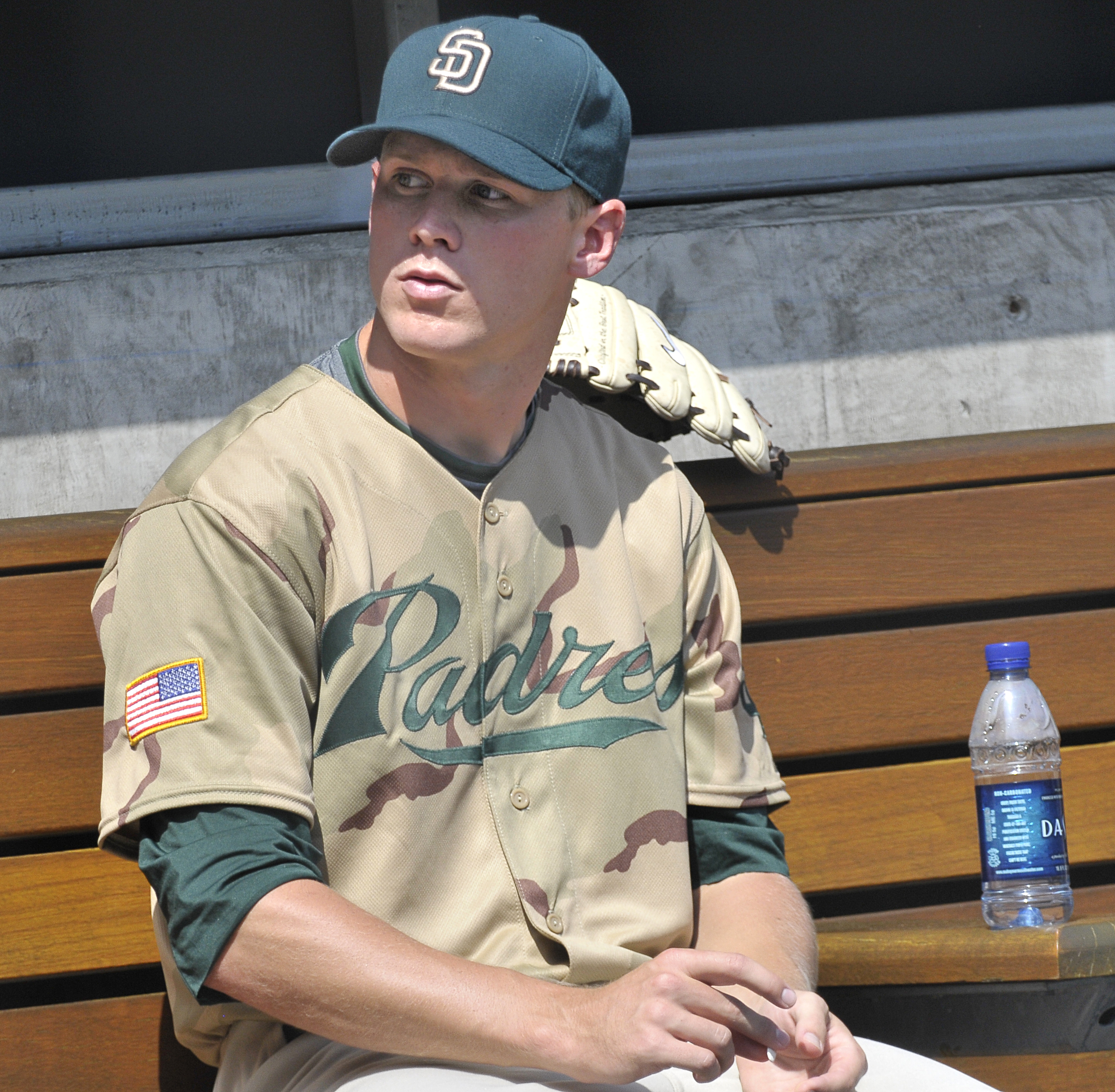
- Ekstrom with the San Diego Padres in 2009
- Pitcher
- Born: August 30, 1983 (age 43); Portland, Oregon, U.S.
- Batted: Right Threw: Right

MLB debut
- September 10, 2008, for the San Diego Padres

Last MLB appearance
- August 12, 2012, for the Colorado Rockies

MLB statistics
- Win–loss record: 0–3
- Earned run average: 5.61
- Strikeouts: 45
- Stats at Baseball Reference

Teams
- San Diego Padres (2008–2009); Tampa Bay Rays (2010–2011); Colorado Rockies (2012)

Michael Robert Ekstrom (born August 30, 1983) is an American former professional baseball pitcher. He played in Major League Baseball (MLB) for the San Diego Padres, Tampa Bay Rays, and Colorado Rockies.

== Amateur career ==
=== College ===
Ekstrom started off his college career at Oregon State University, eventually transferring to NAIA school Point Loma Nazarene University after his sophomore year. Ekstrom was GSAC Pitcher of the Year and NAIA 1st Team All-America in his junior season. He was also named to the Baseball America Small College All-America 1st team.

== Professional career ==
=== San Diego Padres ===
He made his professional debut at the Short-Season Eugene Emeralds in 2004, going 3–1 with a 3.69 ERA in 12 games, seven starts. Ekstrom was one of six Emeralds named to the Northwest League's midseason All-Star team. He opened his career by tossing scoreless ball over his first six appearances from June 18 to July 9. He was promoted to the Class-A Fort Wayne TinCaps on August 21 for his final three starts.

In the 2005 season, his first full professional season, Ekstrom posted a 13–6 record with a 3.70 ERA in 28 starts for Class-A Fort Wayne. He was named to the Midwest League mid-season All-Star team. He was tied for first in the league in starts and shutouts with one, ranked second in innings pitched, third in wins and eighth in ERA. Ekstrom shared the organization lead in wins while ranking third in strikeouts with 112 and sixth in ERA. He made 16 quality starts and went 6–0 with a 1.29 ERA over his first nine starts from April 7 to May 22. He was named Midwest League Pitcher of the Week for the period ending May 22.

Ekstrom was named the Padres' 2006 Minor League Pitcher of the Year after posting a 10–11 record with four complete games, two shutouts and a 3.08 ERA in 28 starts between Class-A Advanced Lake Elsinore Storm and the Double-A Mobile BayBears. He was a California League mid-season All-Star with Lake Elsinore. Ekstrom was among organization leaders, was tied for second in wins, ranked third in ERA and fifth in strikeouts with 117. He was tied for third in the Southern League with three complete games.

In the 2008 season, Ekstrom went 0–2 with a 7.45 ERA, six strikeouts and seven walks and held opponents to a .222 average in four road games with the Padres. His contract purchased from the Double-A San Antonio Missions on September 6. He made his MLB debut on September 10, 2008, striking out Manny Ramirez and pitching two scoreless innings. He appeared in 41 games, 15 starts, with the Missions and went 11–8 with one save and a 4.58 ERA with 101 strikeouts compared to 34 walks. He ranked second in the Texas League in wins and was 7–3 with a save and a 2.57 ERA (in 26 relief appearances with San Antonio. Ekstrom participated in the 2008 Arizona Fall League as a member of the Peoria Saguaros.

Ekstrom went 4–2 with a 1.73 ERA in 42 games, one start with his home-town Triple-A Portland Beavers in 2009. He was promoted to the Padres where he in 12 games he had an ERA of 6.38 ERA in 18 1/3 innings pitched.

=== Tampa Bay Rays ===
On February 3, 2010, Ekstrom was claimed off waivers by the Tampa Bay Rays. In 2010, Ekstrom went 6–1 with a 2.79 ERA with the Durham Bulls (AAA), striking out 48 batters in 58 innings. Over the course of four stints with Tampa, he posted a 0–1 record with a 3.31 ERA for the Rays in 16 innings, striking out 10.

=== Colorado Rockies ===
Ekstrom signed a minor league contract with the Colorado Rockies on December 16, 2011. He had his contract purchased by the Rockies on July 13, 2012. Ekstrom had a 6.32 ERA with 15.2 innings pitched in 15 games.

=== Oakland Athletics ===
On October 29, 2012, Ekstrom signed a minor league deal with the Athletics that included an invitation to spring training.

=== Los Angeles Angels of Anaheim ===
In 2013, Ekstrom signed a minor league deal with the Angels. He pitched in 17 games for the Salt Lake Bees before being released On August 5, 2013.
