= Stan Boroski =

American baseball player & coach

- Coach
- Born: July 14, 1963 (age 63); Martins Ferry, Ohio, U.S.
- Bats: Right Throws: Right
- Stats at Baseball Reference

Teams
- Tampa Bay Rays (2010–2022)

Stanley Joseph Boroski (born July 14, 1963) is an American former professional baseball coach. He was the bullpen coach for the Tampa Bay Rays of Major League Baseball (MLB).

== Playing career ==
Boroski was drafted by the Milwaukee Brewers in the 20th round of the 1981 Major League Baseball draft as a catcher out of Buckeye South High School in Tiltonsville, Ohio. After two years in the Brewers system, he signed with the Kansas City Royals as a pitcher, where he remained for four years. Boroski underwent two rotator-cuff surgeries during his career.

== Coaching career ==
Boroski was named a coach for the Rays on December 17, 2009, following Brian Anderson. He served for the Tampa Bay Rays as the team's bullpen coach for 13 years, retiring following the 2022 season. Prior to joining the Rays, he had spent 18 years with the Houston Astros organization, where he had served as both a scout and coach.

== Personal ==
Boroski has a degree in biology from Ohio University. He resides in St. Cloud, Florida with his wife, Carol, and two children, Sarah and Clayton.
