= Robert Manuel (baseball) =

American baseball player (born 1983)

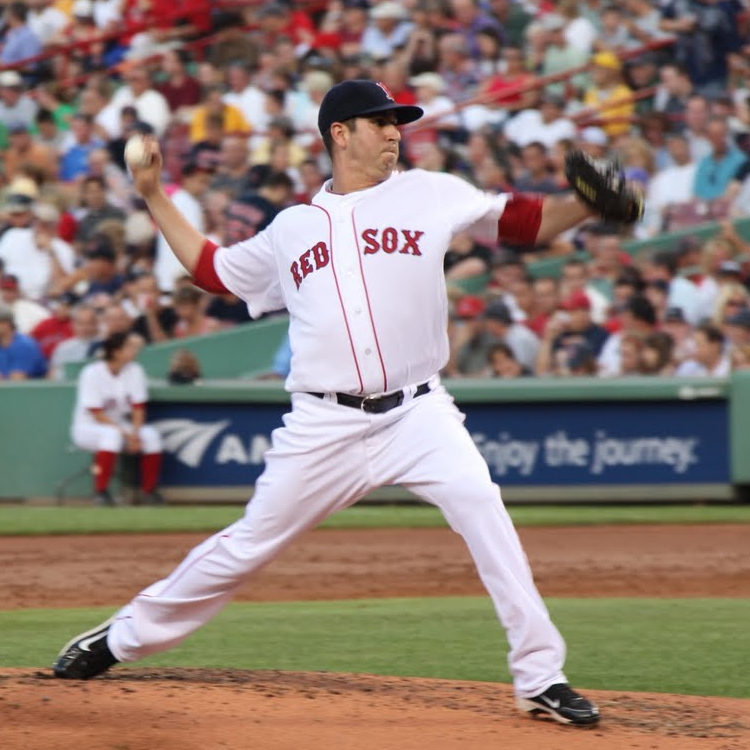
- Manuel pitching for the Boston Red Sox in 2010
- Relief pitcher
- Born: July 9, 1983 (age 43); Houston, Texas, U.S.
- Batted: Right Threw: Right

MLB debut
- July 9, 2009, for the Cincinnati Reds

Last MLB appearance
- October 2, 2010, for the Boston Red Sox

MLB statistics
- Win–loss record: 1–0
- Earned run average: 3.18
- Strikeouts: 7
- WHIP: 1.353
- Stats at Baseball Reference

Teams
- Cincinnati Reds (2009); Boston Red Sox (2010)

Robert Mehmet Manuel (born July 9, 1983) is an American former professional baseball relief pitcher. He pitched parts of two seasons in Major League Baseball (MLB) for the Cincinnati Reds and Boston Red Sox.

== Early years ==
After graduating from Bellaire High School in Greater Houston, Manuel attended Sam Houston State University. He was signed by the New York Mets as a non-drafted free agent in June 2005.

== Career ==
=== Cincinnati Reds ===
Manuel was acquired by the Reds in a 2006 deal for veteran pitcher Dave Williams. In 2008, he received a MiLBY Award for Best Double-A Relief Pitcher.

Manuel was called up to the majors on July 7, 2009. Manuel made his major league debut on July 9 against the Philadelphia Phillies, pitching 1 1/3 innings, striking out two, allowing two hits and walking two; the first player he faced was Pedro Feliz, and the first player Manuel struck out was Paul Bako.

Seattle Mariners

On July 29, 2009, Manuel was traded to the Seattle Mariners for outfielder Wladimir Balentien. After finishing the season with their Triple-A farm team, the Tacoma Rainiers, Manuel was placed on waivers.

=== Boston Red Sox ===
Manuel was claimed on November 20, 2009, by the Boston Red Sox. He was designated for assignment on February 10 and assigned to the Triple-A Pawtucket Red Sox. In June 2010, Manuel was added to Boston's 40-man roster, and on July 3 made his first major league appearance of the season. He pitched in five games in July, then was returned to Pawtucket. He was called back up to the majors in September and pitched in five more games. In his final MLB appearance, he recorded his only MLB decision, a win against the New York Yankees on October 2, when he pitched two innings of scoreless relief.

Late career

Manuel became a free agent on October 13, 2010, after he refused a minor league assignment. He played in the American Association of Independent Professional Baseball for the Fort Worth Cats and St. Paul Saints in 2011. He last played during the 2011–2012 winter season of the Puerto Rico Baseball League for the Indios de Mayagüez.

== Post-playing career ==
After retiring from his professional sports career, Manuel returned to his hometown to become a coach at his former high school, Bellaire. He is now a pitching coach for the Bellaire Cardinals, and is also a physical education coach.
