= Manny Delcarmen =

American baseball player (born 1982)

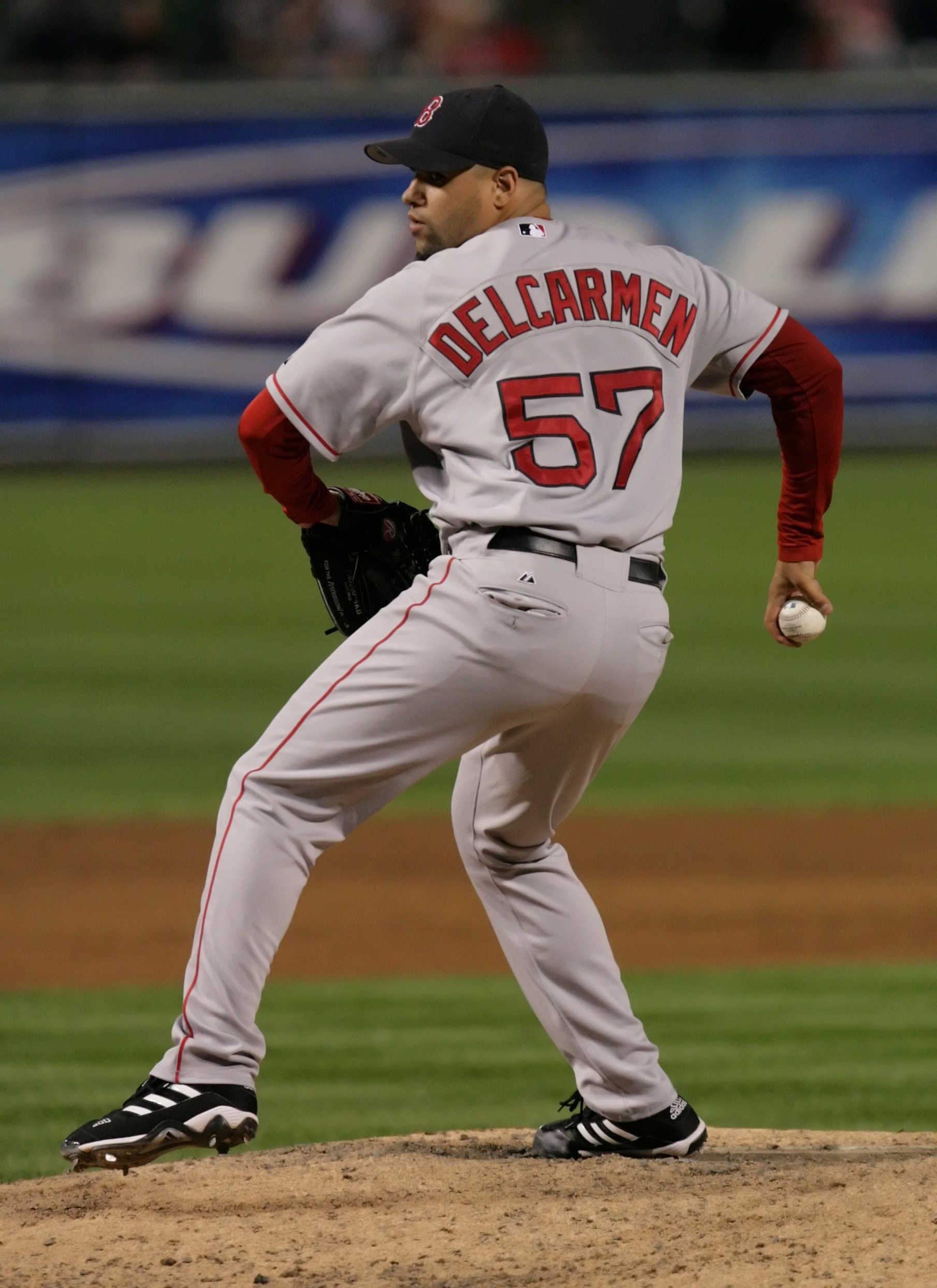
- Delcarmen with the Boston Red Sox in 2006
- Pitcher
- Born: February 16, 1982 (age 44); Hyde Park, Boston, Massachusetts, U.S.
- Batted: Right Threw: Right

MLB debut
- July 26, 2005, for the Boston Red Sox

Last MLB appearance
- September 30, 2010, for the Colorado Rockies

MLB statistics
- Win–loss record: 11–8
- Earned run average: 3.97
- Strikeouts: 249
- Stats at Baseball Reference

Teams
- Boston Red Sox (2005–2010); Colorado Rockies (2010)

Career highlights and awards
- World Series champion (2007)

Manuel Delcarmen (born February 16, 1982), nicknamed The Pride of Hyde Park, is an American former professional baseball pitcher. He played in Major League Baseball (MLB) from 2005 through 2010 for the Boston Red Sox and Colorado Rockies; he was a member of Boston's 2007 World Series championship team. He later served as an assistant coach with Fisher College in Boston during the 2022 season.

== Early life ==
Delcarmen is a native of the Hyde Park section of Boston, Massachusetts, and a graduate of West Roxbury High School.

== MLB career ==
=== Boston Red Sox ===
Delcarmen was a second-round pick by Boston in the 2000 Major League Baseball draft; he was the first draftee from a Boston public high school in 34 years. Beginning the season with the Double-A Portland Sea Dogs, he posted a 4–4 record with three saves and a 3.23 earned run average (ERA) in 31 games. After a promotion to the Triple-A Pawtucket Red Sox, he struck out 12 batters over nine innings with a 3.00 ERA.

Delcarmen's professional career was on the fast track with a mid-90s fastball and a great curveball, until he injured his throwing arm while pitching in a Florida State League game, requiring Tommy John surgery in May 2003. He returned to the mound a year later. Post-surgery, Delcarmen's fastball may have actually gained velocity, as he topped out in the high 90s. Delcarmen had decent control, with a decent changeup and a very good curve which he used as his out pitch.

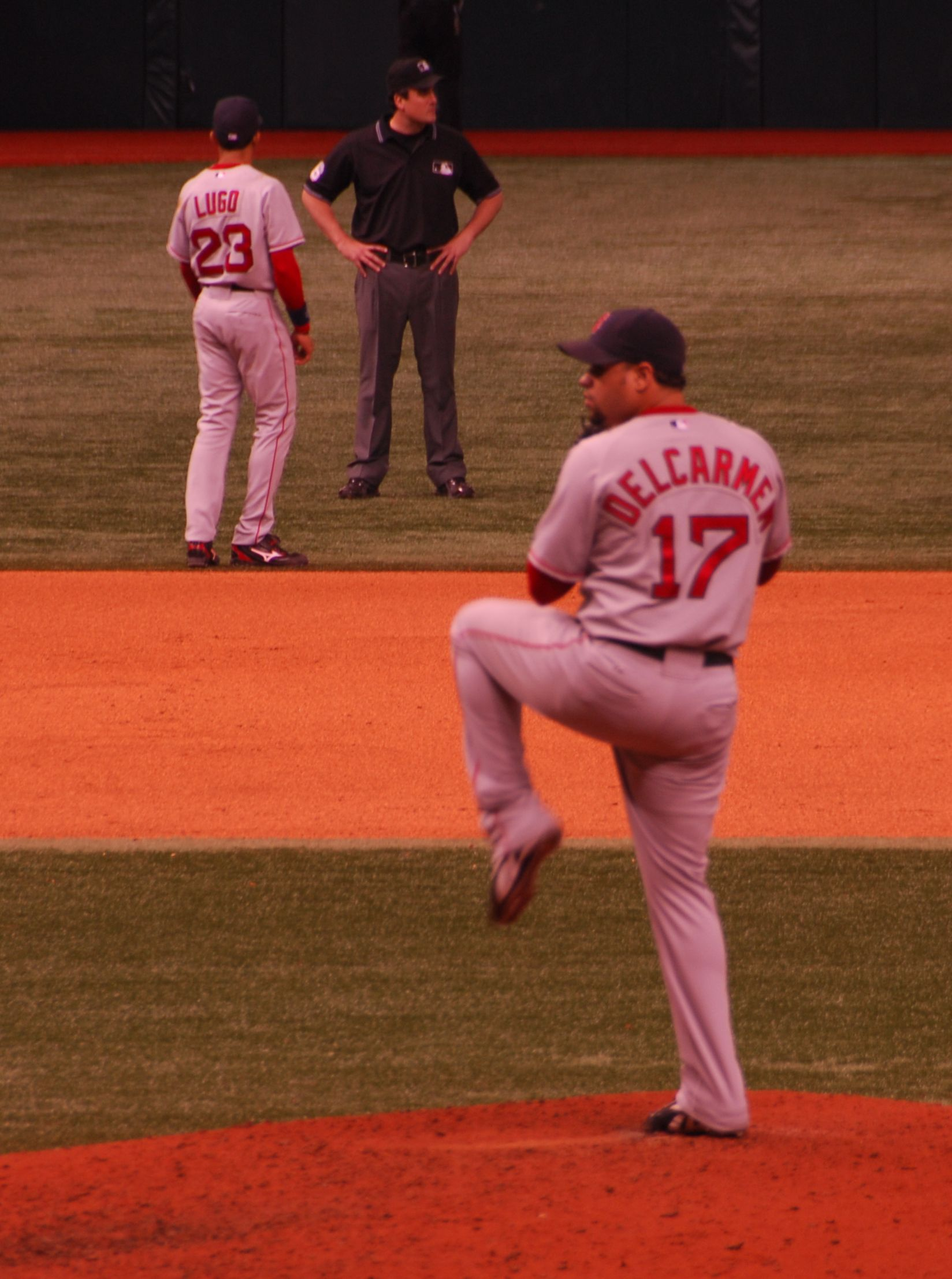
Delcarmen warming up in 2007

In 2005, Delcarmen was called up to the major leagues for 10 games. He made his debut with the Red Sox on July 26, 2005. During the regular season, he pitched a total of nine innings with a 3.00 ERA and nine strikeouts.

After starting the 2006 season in Pawtucket, Delcarmen was recalled to the major leagues on April 22. On June 11, Delcarmen got his first major league win, pitching two innings of relief against the Texas Rangers.

Delcarmen was off and on the Boston roster during the 2007 season. He was recalled from Pawtucket on June 17, when relief pitcher Brendan Donnelly was placed on the disabled list. On July 23, Delcarmen finished out a 6–2 Red Sox victory over Cleveland with 1 1/3 innings of scoreless relief, recording his first major league save. He finished the 2007 season with 44 innings in the majors and a 2.05 ERA. In the 2007 playoffs, he had 4 1/3 innings pitched, allowing four earned runs, and was a member of the 2007 World Series championship team.

After an intensive offseason workout regimen, Delcarmen lost 15 pounds (6.8 kg). Manager Terry Francona remarked that "he’s lean and he’s looking really good." During the 2008 season, Delcarmen appeared in 73 games for Boston, recording a 1–2 record with two saves, 3.27 ERA, and 72 strikeouts.

During 2009, Delcarmen's record was 5–2 with 4.53 ERA and 44 strikeouts during 64 games played. He started the 2010 season with Boston, where he appeared in 48 games with a 3–2 record, 4.70 ERA and 32 strikeouts.

Overall, Delcarmen spent parts of six seasons with the Red Sox, appearing in 289 games while compiling an 11–6 record with three saves and 243 strikeouts in 284 1/3 innings pitched.

=== Colorado Rockies ===
On August 31, 2010, Delcarmen was traded to Colorado for minor league pitcher Chris Balcom-Miller. Delcarmen appeared in nine games for the Rockies during the 2010 season, pitching 8 1/3 innings while giving up six earned runs (6.48 ERA) and striking out six. He became a free agent following the season.

=== Seattle Mariners ===
On February 10, 2011, Delcarmen signed a minor league contract with the Seattle Mariners. In 18 appearances for the Triple-A Tacoma Rainiers, he posted a 2-2 record and 5.14 ERA with 23 strikeouts across 28 innings of work. Delcarmen was released by the Mariners organization on May 31.

=== Texas Rangers ===
On June 2, 2011, Delcarmen signed a minor league contract with the Texas Rangers. He was assigned to the Triple-A Round Rock Express. Delcarmen was released on July 13, after making eight appearances for the Express, posting a 6.75 ERA.

=== New York Yankees ===
On January 27, 2012, Delcarmen signed a minor league contract with the New York Yankees. He also received an invitation to spring training. Delcarmen spent the 2012 season with the Triple-A Scranton/Wilkes-Barre Yankees. He elected free agency after the season on November 2.

=== Baltimore Orioles ===
On January 28, 2013, Delcarmen signed a minor league contract with the Baltimore Orioles. During the 2013 season, he appeared in 48 games for the Triple-A Norfolk Tides, compiling a 3–3 record with 2.83 ERA. He became a free agent following the season on November 4.

=== Washington Nationals ===
On December 2, 2013, Delcarmen signed a minor league contract, with an invitation to spring training, with the Washington Nationals. During the 2014 and 2015 seasons, he pitched for the Triple-A Syracuse Chiefs. Delcarmen was released by the Nationals organization on June 7, 2015.

=== Diablos Rojos del México ===
On July 2, 2015, Delcarmen signed with the Diablos Rojos del México of the Mexican League. In 15 appearances for México, he compiled a 1-0 record and 3.06 ERA with 13 strikeouts across 17 2/3 innings pitched. Delcarmen was released by the Diablos on February 2, 2016.

=== Saraperos de Saltillo ===
On April 1, 2016, Delcarmen signed with the Saraperos de Saltillo of the Mexican League. In 2 games for Saltillo, he posted a 1-0 record and 4.50 ERA with no strikeouts and 1 save across 2 innings of relief. Delcarmen was released by the Saraperos on April 7.

=== Bridgeport Bluefish ===
On April 4, 2017, Delcarmen signed with the Bridgeport Bluefish of the independent Atlantic League of Professional Baseball. In 59 games for the Bluefish, he registered a 3-2 record and 4.40 ERA with 54 strikeouts and 9 saves over 57 1/3 innings of relief.

=== New Britain Bees ===
On November 1, 2017, Delcarmen was selected by the New Britain Bees in a dispersal draft of Bridgeport players. On March 20, 2018, he officially signed with the team. Delcarmen officially retired from professional baseball after pitching in a game for the Bees on May 31. He announced that he would be pursuing an opportunity as a studio analyst for the Boston Red Sox. Delcarmen appeared in 12 games for the Bees, struggling to a 6.75 ERA with 7 strikeouts across 10 2/3 innings pitched.

== Non-MLB career ==
=== Winter league baseball ===
Delcarmen pitched for Venados de Mazatlán of the Mexican Pacific League during the 2015–2016 and 2016–2017 winter seasons, and for Tiburones de La Guaira of the Venezuelan Professional Baseball League during the 2017–2018 winter season.

Manny Delcarmen
Current position
- Title: Assistant coach

Coaching career (HC unless noted)

Baseball
- 2022–2022: Fisher Falcons (Asst.)

=== College baseball coaching ===
In September 2021, Delcarmen joined the coaching staff of Fisher College in Boston as an assistant baseball coach. He did not return for the 2023 season.
