= Jeff Niemann =

American baseball player (born 1983)

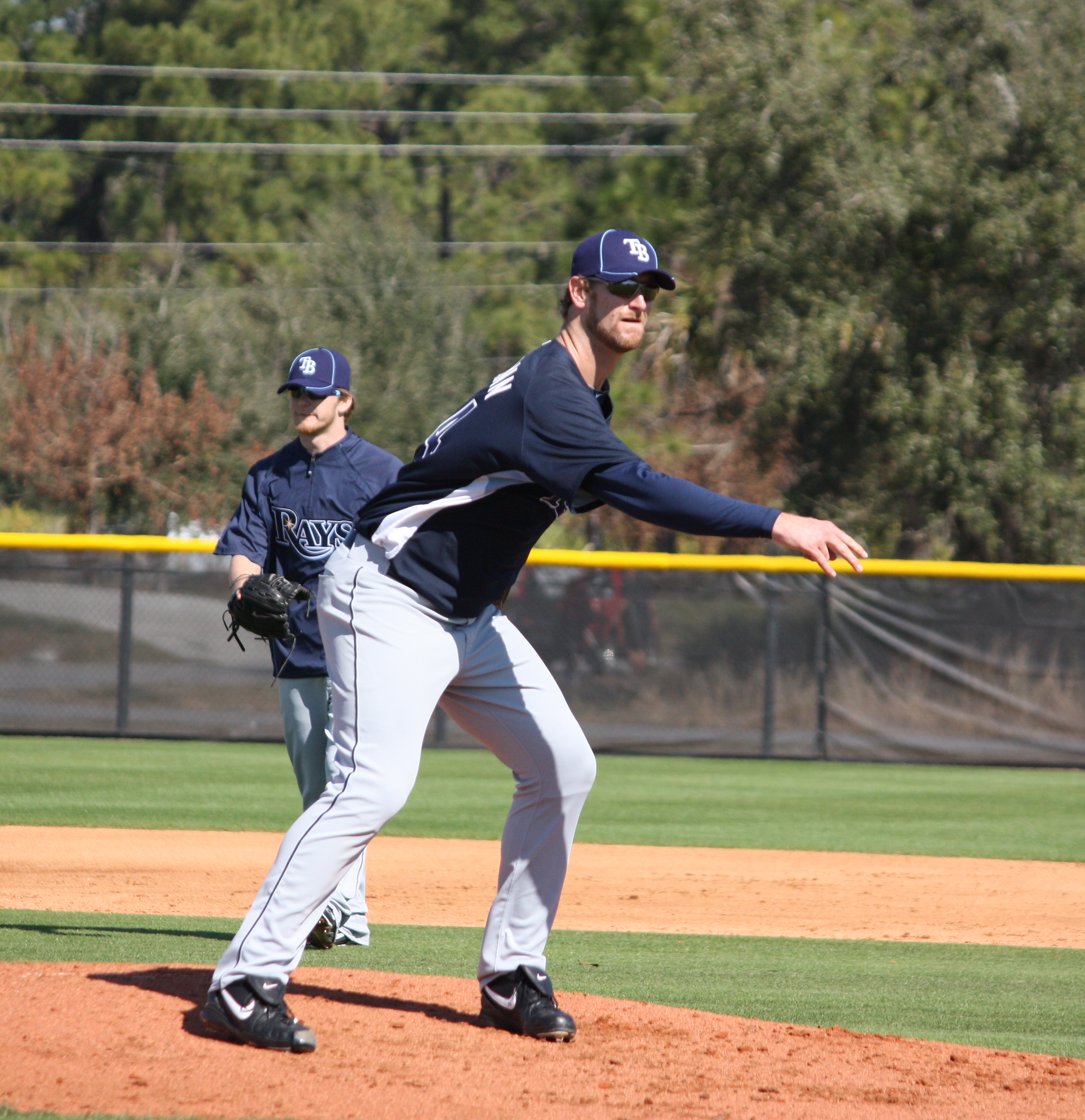
- Niemann with the Tampa Bay Rays
- Pitcher
- Born: February 28, 1983 (age 42); Houston, Texas, U.S.
- Batted: Right Threw: Right

MLB debut
- April 13, 2008, for the Tampa Bay Rays

Last MLB appearance
- September 1, 2012, for the Tampa Bay Rays

MLB statistics
- Win–loss record: 40–26
- Earned run average: 4.08
- Strikeouts: 409
- Stats at Baseball Reference

Teams
- Tampa Bay Rays (2008–2012)

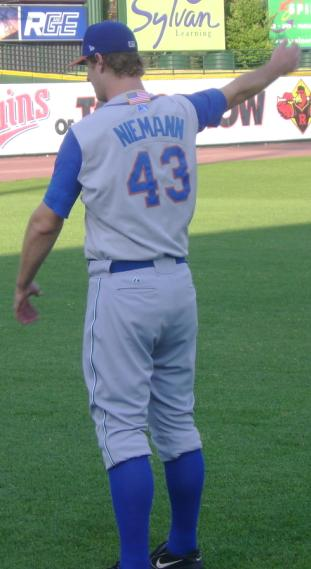
Niemann during his tenure with the Durham Bulls, Triple-A affiliates of the Tampa Bay Rays, in 2008.

Jeffrey Warren Niemann (born February 28, 1983) is an American former professional baseball starting pitcher. He played in Major League Baseball (MLB) for the Tampa Bay Rays from 2008 to 2012.

== High school ==
Niemann attended Lamar High School.

== College ==
Niemann, who stands 6 feet 9 inches (2.06 m), was the fourth starter for Rice University in his freshman season of 2002, usually starting midweek non-conference games. He posted a 5–1 record with a 3.11 ERA, including a victory over Washington in the decisive seventh game of the 2002 NCAA regional at Rice's Reckling Park. In 2003, he stepped into Rice's weekend rotation and quickly became the nation's most dominant pitcher. He finished the season 17–0 with a 1.70 ERA and 156 strikeouts, being named Western Athletic Conference Pitcher of the Year, a consensus first-team all-American, and a finalist for the Rotary Smith Award in helping Rice to its first national championship. In 2002 and 2003, he played collegiate summer baseball with the Harwich Mariners of the Cape Cod Baseball League.

Niemann battled injuries as a junior in 2004, but still went 6–3 with a 3.02 ERA in 11 starts, including a complete game victory over Texas A&M in the NCAA regional. The entire Rice weekend rotation, including Philip Humber, Wade Townsend, and Niemann, were all selected in the first eight picks of the 2004 Major League Baseball draft – the first time three teammates had ever gone so early in the same draft.

== Professional career ==
Niemann was the Tampa Bay Devil Rays' first-round draft pick out of Rice University in 2004 as the fourth overall pick. He signed a major league contract in January 2005 worth $5.2 million. Niemann opened the 2005 season with the High-A Visalia Oaks, where he went 0–1 with a 3.98 ERA in five starts. After a promotion to the Double-A Montgomery Biscuits, he went 0–1 with a 4.35 ERA in six appearances, including three starts. He had offseason surgery in 2005 to shave the joint between his collarbone and shoulder and returned to Montgomery in 2006. Flanked in the rotation by starting pitchers Andy Sonnanstine and Mitch Talbot during the Southern League playoffs, Niemann helped lead the Biscuits to the 2006 championship. Following the 2006 season, Baseball America named Niemann the Rays' fourth-best prospect, following Delmon Young, Evan Longoria, and Reid Brignac; they also said Niemann possessed the best slider of any pitcher in the Rays' organization.

Niemann spent the 2007 season with the Triple-A Durham Bulls. In 25 appearances, all starts, he compiled a 12–6 record and a 3.98 ERA. He was selected to the All-Star Futures Game.

Niemann made his major league debut on April 13, 2008, against the Baltimore Orioles, pitching 6 innings en route to his first career win. In 5 appearances (2 starts) during his rookie campaign, Niemann logged a 2-2 record and 5.06 ERA with 14 strikeouts over 16 innings of work.

Niemann's team leading 13–6 record and 3.94 ERA in 2009 earned him a place in national AL Rookie of the Year Award discussions. He also compiled 125 strikeouts in 180 2/3 innings pitched over 31 games (30 starts). The Tampa Bay Chapter of the Baseball Writers' Association of America named Niemann the Rookie of the Year for the Rays for the 2009 season in a unanimous decision by the voters.

Niemann made 30 appearances (29 starts) for Tampa Bay during the 2010 campaign, posting a 12-8 record and 4.39 ERA with 131 strikeouts across 174 1/3 innings pitched. He made 23 starts for the Rays in 2011, compiling an 11-7 record and 4.06 ERA with 105 strikeouts across 135 1/3 innings pitched.

On May 14, 2012, Niemann got hit with a comebacker by Adam Lind of the Toronto Blue Jays, which fractured his leg. He was expected to miss 4-6 weeks with the injury. Niemann made only 8 starts for Tampa Bay in 2012, registering a 2-3 record and 3.08 ERA with 34 strikeouts over 38 innings of work.

On April 9, 2013, it was announced that Niemann would undergo season-ending surgery to repair his labrum and rotator cuff. On November 18, Niemann was removed from the 40-man roster and sent outright to Triple-A Durham, but rejected the assignment and elected free agency.
