= 2010 Texas Rangers season =

Major League Baseball season

2010 Texas Rangers
- American League champions American League West champions
- League: American League
- Division: West
- Ballpark: Rangers Ballpark in Arlington
- City: Arlington, Texas
- Record: 90–72 (.556)
- Divisional place: 1st
- Owners: Hicks Sports Group (Tom Hicks) transferred to Rangers Baseball Express (Chuck Greenberg, Nolan Ryan, Ray Davis and Bob R. Simpson)
- General managers: Jon Daniels
- Managers: Ron Washington
- Television: Fox Sports Southwest; KTXA (Josh Lewin, Tom Grieve)
- Radio: KRLD 105.3 FM (Weekdays); KRLD 1080 AM (Weekends) (Eric Nadel, Dave Barnett); KFLC 1270 AM (Spanish) (Eleno Ornelas, Jerry Romo)

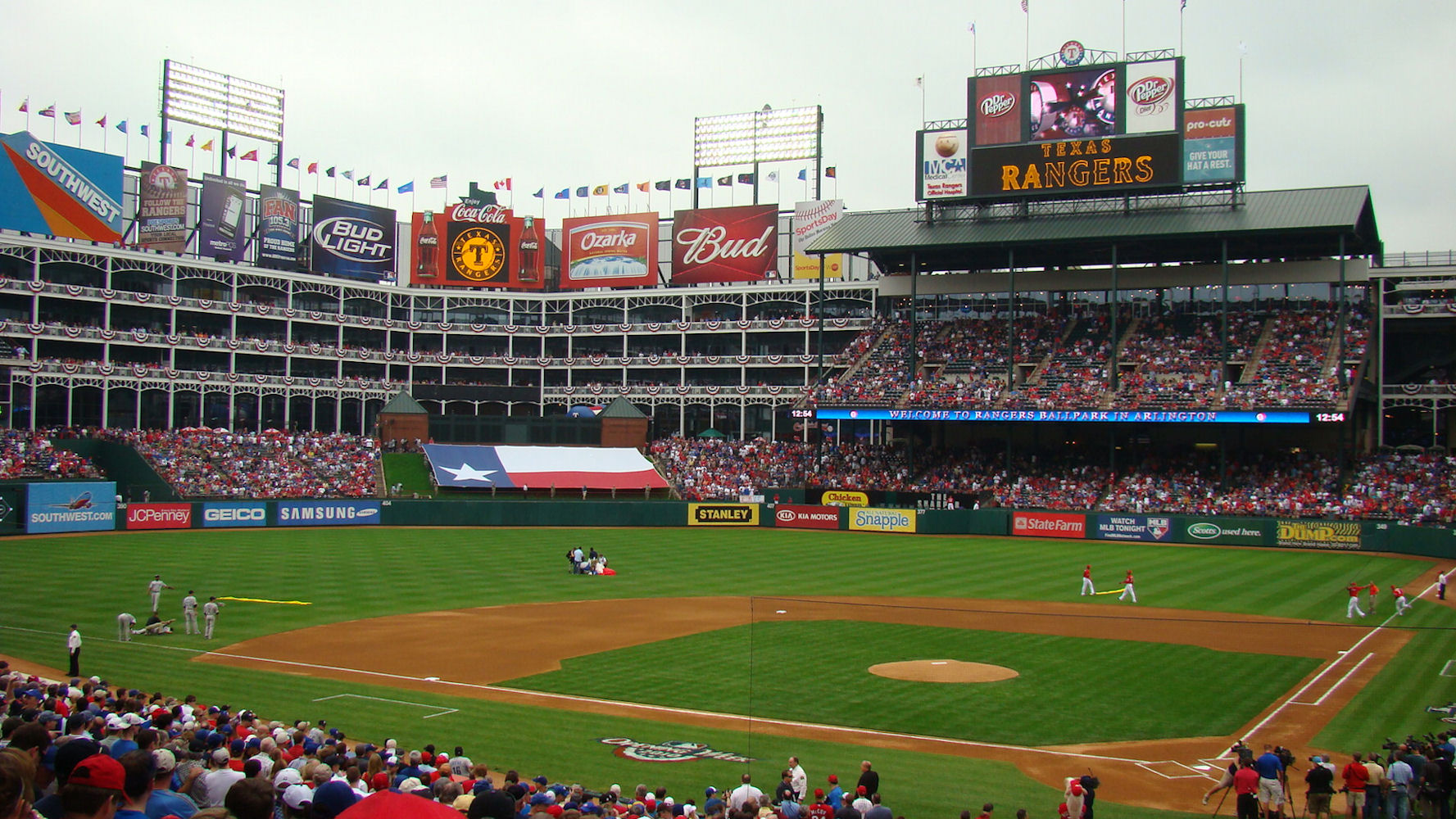
The Rangers Ballpark in Arlington, opening day 4/5/2010

The 2010 Texas Rangers season was the 50th of the Texas Rangers franchise overall, their 39th in Arlington as the Rangers, and the 17th season at Rangers Ballpark in Arlington. The team, managed by Ron Washington, won their first American League West title since 1999 and finally won a playoff series, taking longer than any other North American professional sports franchise to accomplish the feat and making them the last of the 30 MLB clubs to advance past the division series. The club subsequently reached the World Series for the first time in only their fourth playoff appearance. Washington would become only the second manager in franchise history to lead the Rangers to the post season and the first to ever win a post season series. They would win the American League pennant by defeating the defending World Series champions, the New York Yankees, in six games in the ALCS. In the World Series, they lost to the San Francisco Giants in five games.

The 2010 season showed the results of a 5-year plan implemented by general manager Jon Daniels in 2007 with the Mark Teixeira trade. The 2007 trade deadline and the amateur draft a month prior would all be key pieces of the successful Rangers season. Dominant rookie of the year closer Neftalí Feliz, defensive All-Star Elvis Andrus, and platoon outfielder David Murphy were all acquired at the trade deadline, while starting pitcher Tommy Hunter, centerfielder Julio Borbon and first baseman Mitch Moreland were each selected in the June 2007 draft. And trades which resulted in Cliff Lee, Bengie Molina, and Jorge Cantú were each completed with a member of the Rangers 2007 draft class being sent in return.

Mirroring the 2009 revelation of Josh Hamilton getting drunk at a bar in Arizona prior to spring training, the Rangers' team members learned that manager Ron Washington failed an MLB drug test prior to the All-Star game in 2009. Instead of dividing the locker room or casting doubt with the players, the teammates stood behind their manager. "I've got Wash's back. He's my manager", third baseman Michael Young told teammates during a meeting where Washington informed the players of his failed drug test.

The pitching staff, looking to be a strength for one of the first times in recent history, would depend on the #3 and 4 starters, C. J. Wilson and Colby Lewis, due to a lack of expected production from Scott Feldman and free agent Rich Harden. Wilson, Lewis, and trade deadline ace Cliff Lee would each finish in the top 20 among American League pitchers in ERA, innings pitched, strikeouts, and WHIP.

A complicated team sale that would end up in bankruptcy court and possibly cost the team president Nolan Ryan and GM Jon Daniels would be an outside threat the team would have to ignore until it was resolved in August.

Thanks to utility infielder Esteban Germán the "claw and antlers" would become an active part of the Rangers in-game celebration. Following a play involving strength a Rangers' player would look to the bench and raise his right arm with fingers outstretched to make a claw. After a play involving speed a player would place his thumbs on each side of his head and outstretch his fingers to make antlers. The fans would embrace the "claws and antlers" and a "claw and antlers" T-shirt, designed by Rangers equipment manager Richard "Hoggy" Price, which would be the top selling MLB T-shirt sold in 2010, selling over 360,000, even though the design was not introduced until after the All-Star game. On the final day of the season fans would participate in a pre-game "claw and antlers" parade.

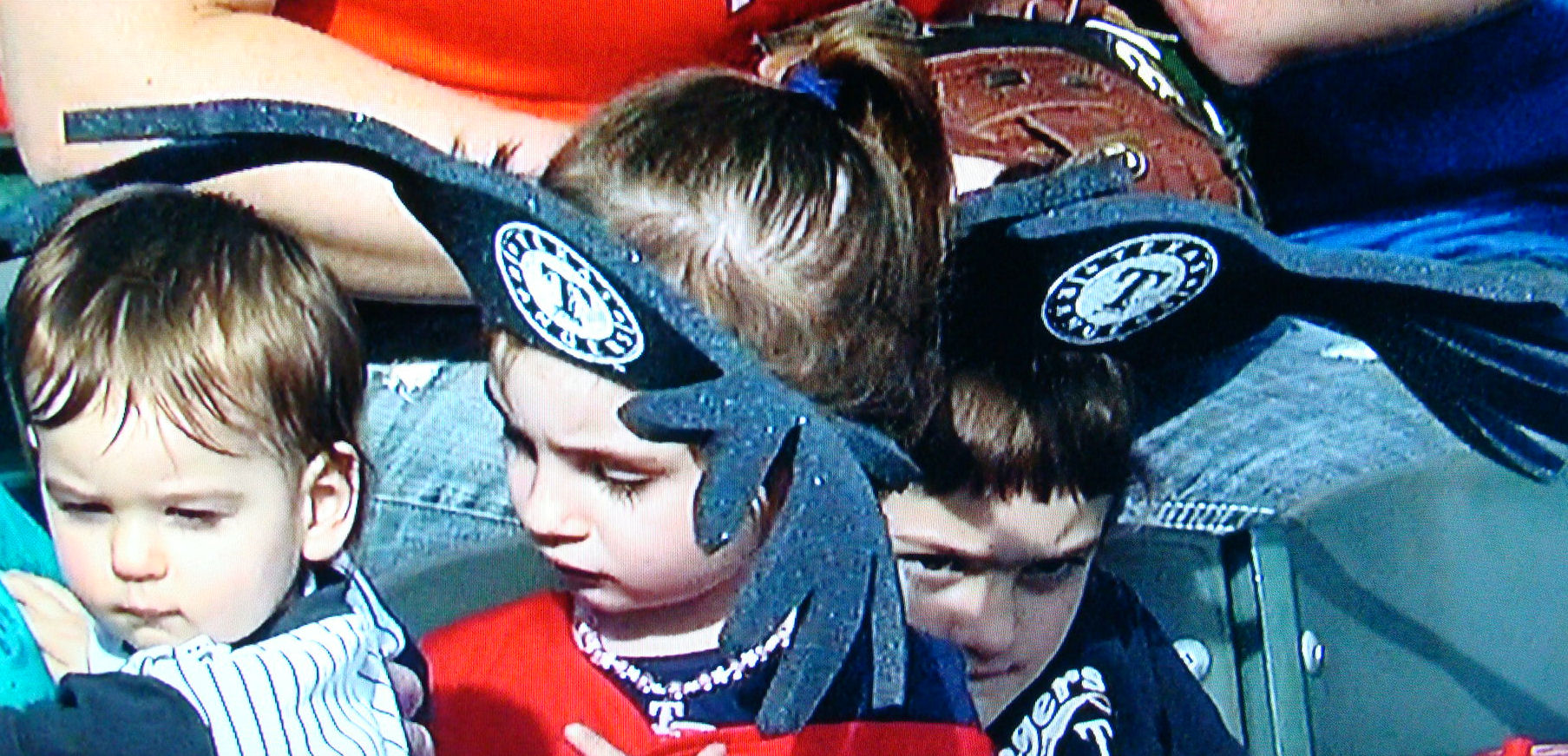
Two Ranger fans wearing their "antlers" to an October game

== Offseason ==
Rudy Jaramillo turned down a 1-year extension and took the hitting coach position with the Chicago Cubs.

The Rangers signed Clint Hurdle for the position of hitting coach.

Iván Rodríguez signed a 2-year deal with the Washington Nationals. The Rangers received a compensation draft pick for Rodriguez who was a type B free agent. The other type B free agent on the Rangers, Marlon Byrd, signed a 3-year deal with the Chicago Cubs, re-joining his hitting instructor Jaramillo.

Omar Vizquel signed with the Chicago White Sox, as well as Andruw Jones. Neither free agent met type A or B status so Texas received no compensation for their departures.

At the winter meetings Jon Daniels made headline moves when Texas traded Kevin Millwood and $3 million to the Baltimore Orioles for pitcher Chris Ray and a PTBNL. The Orioles later selected Ben Snyder in the rule 5 draft from the San Francisco Giants and sent Snyder to the Rangers to complete the trade.

Following the Millwood trade, the Rangers signed Rich Harden to a 1-year deal. The contract includes a mutual 2nd year option. Michael Young told the media his new teammate "... has the best stuff in the league. I didn't say some of the best stuff. I mean the best stuff I've seen." Harden was not offered arbitration by his former club, the Cubs, so Texas did not lose a draft pick to sign the type A free agent.

One trade that was not finalized would have sent Mike Lowell and approximately $9 million in cash to the Rangers and the Red Sox would have received AAA catcher Max Ramírez. The trade was cancelled after a physical discovered an injury to Lowell's thumb that would require surgery.

Vladimir Guerrero signed a 1-year contract with Texas with a mutual 2nd year option. Guerrero would be the DH and was planned to hit 4th behind Josh Hamilton.

The Rangers signed Khalil Greene to a 1-year contract. Greene would have been the utility infielder meeting a need for the team by being able to play 3B and SS, able to back up Michael Young and Elvis Andrus. On January 14 the Rangers and Colby Lewis agreed to a two-year deal. The former Rangers draft pick spent the previous 2 years pitching in Japan where he led the league in strikeouts both seasons and issued only 46 walks in a total of 354 1/3 innings pitched. On January 21 it was reported the Rangers designated OF Greg Golson for assignment. Golson was later traded to the New York Yankees for a minor league infielder. On January 25 Joe Inglett was designated for assignment to make room for Lewis on the 40-man roster. Inglett was claimed off waivers by the Milwaukee Brewers.

All-Star 2nd baseman Ian Kinsler had praise for the offseason moves made by the front office. He acknowledged hating to lose Millwood, but recognized how the moves made 2010 the year the Rangers could win the division.

We basically covered every question we had going into the off-season, with very little spending money. JD made some very smart moves at the winter meetings. You never like to see a teammate get traded, especially someone who did so much for the organization in four years like Kevin, but JD and the rest of his guys thought that move was necessary. When we were able to get Vlad ... the signings we had before that were exciting, but to be able to get Vlad, it just got us all excited. We realize that this is our year. It's all up to us now.

— Ian Kinsler, Fort Worth Star Telegram, January 22, 2010

Two final additions to the pitching depth came from an unexpected source. Ranger pitchers Omar Beltré and Alexi Ogando had been banned from receiving US visas after being involved in a marriage-visa scam 5 years ago. Since that time the Rangers, the players, and their agents have been requesting new visas for the players and they were finally approved by February. Both players were listed on the restricted list on the team's 40-man roster, meaning the Rangers retained rights to their MLB services if they ever returned to the United States, but they did not count towards total players allowed on the roster. Both players had to be removed from the restricted list at the completion of spring training.

== Financial problems ==
Rangers owner Tom Hicks' company, Hicks Sports Group (HSG), defaulted on loan payments in 2008 or 2009. Although Hicks had maintained the Rangers were not being affected by the financial transactions, the Rangers had been hampered by the financial troubles of HSG. Most notable was the Rangers inability to sign their 2009 1st round draft pick Matt Purke. After the deadline passed, it was reported the Rangers offered Purke a $4.0 million bonus, two million less than what Purke was reported to be demanding prior to the draft. However, a conflicting report by Randy Galloway said MLB rejected the Rangers contract offer and told Purke that the Rangers would only be allowed to offer a $2.4 million bonus. Hicks later told The Dallas Morning News that the Rangers did offer Purke a $4.0 million offer, and MLB had no influence over the dollar amounts. Ryan would later contradict this claim saying MLB and the commissioner's office had direct dealings with the Rangers in almost all aspects of their financial transactions including approval of bonus money and trade approvals. Ryan and Daniels both said the offer to Purke was "well above slot", but the exact details of the offer were not described, and there may have been other factors as to why Purke did not sign.

By September 2009, speculation had begun to build about MLB forcing the Rangers to shut down front rotation man Kevin Millwood before he surpassed his inning threshold that would vest his 2010 option for $12 million. Hicks did admit that the Rangers had received some advances from MLB, but that the money borrowed would be repaid out of future earnings due the team at the end of the year. In October 2009, MLB executive vice president Rob Manfred sent a letter to then potential buyers Chuck Greenberg and Nolan Ryan informing them the Rangers had been in violation of the collective-bargaining agreement and owed around $40 million. Another major problem for the Rangers following the 2009 season was the refund for prepaid post season tickets. Some fans did not receive refunds from the Rangers until late December, even after the team failed to make the post season.

During the winter meetings, Daniels told the press that the financial problems the Rangers were under was much like operating under a salary cap. These problems were why the Rangers had to trade Millwood before being able to make the Harden signing official. An increase was made to the team budget after the new year when the ownership sale was preliminarily finalized between Hicks and Greenberg/Ryan. Ryan spoke about the financial constraints the team was under after the initial sale agreement was announced.

We were required to have any expenditure that was not budgeted for had to be approved and also any signing outside of the slot limit had to be approved. There were obviously some restrictions that other clubs weren't under. MLB did not want to affect the normal day-to-day operations. It really did not encumber us to the point where we couldn't do anything. They realized we needed to run as usual as much as we possibly could.

— Nolan Ryan, ESPN Dallas, January 26, 2010

Hicks told reporters that from April 2007 to March 2009 he added an additional $85 million to HSG. According to Hicks, HSG took on too much debt because the teams were spending more than the budget allowed. However, according to Forbes, the revenue and operating net income of both the Rangers and the Dallas Stars went up from 2006 to 2008. Between the 2006 and 2007 seasons, the debt level for the Texas Rangers increased by approximately $100 million, the same time period when Hicks purchased Liverpool Football Club. From 2007 to 2009, Forbes reported the Rangers and the Stars were the third most leveraged franchises in their respective sports.

== Ownership sale ==
Hicks had been looking for someone to sell partial ownership of the club to since just prior to when the default on the loan was reported. By the 2009 season, Hicks was possibly forced to find a buyer for the team. Three known bids were put in for the ownership of the Rangers. Former agent Dennis Gilbert, Houston businessman Jim Crane, and a partnership of Chuck Greenberg and Nolan Ryan placed bids believed to be around $500 million for the purchase of the team. Hicks offered exclusive negotiation rights to the Greenburg-Ryan group on December 15 with a purchase expected to be complete prior to or following the start of the 2010 season. During the bidding process, it was discovered that Ryan, as president of the club, was not under contract, but working only on a handshake deal with Hicks, and that he would step down from the front office if another bidder were to win. After talks with Gilbert, Ryan later said he would not step down unless asked by the new owner to do so.

In an e-mail dated December 29 sent to HSG attorney Glenn West, MLB attorney Tom Ostertag instructed HSG that "negotiation toward a definitive purchase agreement is to be with the winning bidder only", and no other party is to be involved during the exclusive negotiation process. HSG attorney West then emailed the creditors of HSG on New Year's Eve saying "Basically, the response from the MLB was to prohibit us from negotiating with anyone other than Greenberg. Their intent seems to be to lock us into Greenberg even though Crane now has a clearly superior economic deal – and may always have had based on Greenberg's current position. We need help here. Unless the lenders weigh in, we are going to be stuck negotiating a deal that is clearly worse than Crane's." West also told the creditors that Crane's offer was at least $13 million more and maybe even $20 million more than Greenberg's.

The winter owners' meeting was held prior to the end of the 30-day exclusive negotiation between Hicks and Greenburg. Representing the Rangers at the meeting, Hicks told the media "You're not getting rid of us", indicating the known desire for Hicks to keep his family a minority owner of the Rangers after the sale was completed. The 30-day negotiating period ended on January 14, 2010, with no announcement about the pending sale. On Saturday, January 16, Ryan and Greenberg released a joint statement regarding the sale of the MLB club saying they were "on the verge of an agreement".

We have made extraordinary progress the last couple of weeks and have come too far to walk away now. We are fully committed and prepared to work around the clock if that's what it takes to reach a final agreement. We are at a point where deals get done as long as both parties share a desire to cross the finish line together. There just isn't much left to resolve.

It was reported on January 23 the sale agreement had been completed. Early reports indicated Hicks would remain a minority owner with the club and would serve on the board in a non-voting honorary position. Approval from the executive and ownership committee, the banks who were owed money by HSG, and 75% of MLB owners was still required before the sale could have been finalized. The new company would be called Rangers Baseball Express. Greenberg would serve as CEO and managing partner, and Ray Davis and Bob Simpson would be co-chairmen of the board. As a part of the original purchase agreement, Rangers Baseball Express also would acquire approximately 153 acres (0.62 km^{2}) of land adjacent to Rangers Ballpark in Arlington and Cowboys Stadium. A separate company owned by Hicks owns the land. After the land sale was announced, Hicks was sued by a former partner over the land. The former partner claims Hicks never dissolved the partnership that was formed when the two groups were planning the development called Glorypark. Hicks was also sued by an architectural firm, RTKL, and a construction company, Vratsinas, for $6.9 million of unpaid work done over three years ago. Greenberg posted the following on his Facebook page after the original purchase agreement was announced:

Tonight was a big night for Nolan Ryan and me as we signed the definitive agreement to purchase the Texas Rangers. Thank you to everyone for your incredible support and encouragement over the last few months. Nolan and I can't wait to get started in our efforts to bring Rangers fans everywhere what you have waited for ...all these years. Thanks again and.... See you at the Ballpark!....... Chuck

A report by Jon Heyman listed the sale price at $570 million. At least one group whose approval was needed, Monarch Alternative Capital, refused to sign off on the sale. Monarch Alternative Capital, which purchased a portion of Hicks Sports Group's debt after HSG defaulted, believed Hicks passed up on a better purchase deal from Jim Crane, who was speculated by the December 29 email to have made a higher offer. The reported gap between creditors demands and payment offered by HSG was $270 million and $300 million and would have been resolved if the amount Hicks was to receive from the land sale was lowered to increase the creditors for the debt. MLB's commissioner, Bud Selig, expressed his interest in the deal being approved by the creditors no later than April 9, 2010, and indicated that MLB could become more directly involved in the sale process.

On May 24, 2010, Hicks announced that HSG had filed for Chapter 11 bankruptcy protection to conclude the sale of the Rangers ballclub from Hicks Sports Group to the Rangers Baseball Express club. In a press conference held at the Ballpark in Arlington, Hicks, Ryan, and Greenberg announced the decision and effects from the action. It was believed by the parties involved, including MLB and Selig, that this action would be the quickest and easiest way to resolve the sale without the approval of HSG creditors, mainly Monarch Capital. The sale presented to the bankruptcy court is "virtually the same" deal that was agreed to by Hicks and Greenberg/Ryan when the two parties agreed to the sale in January 2010.

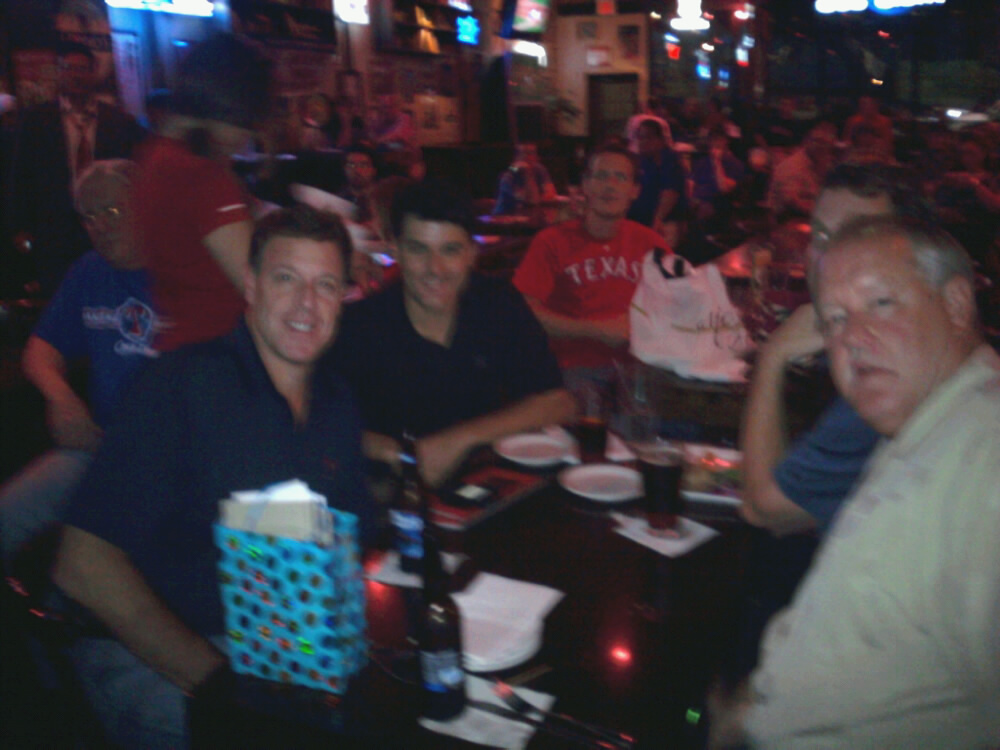
New Rangers owner Chuck Greenberg (left front) met with fans at almost every home game and participated in other fan events like this August watch party in Arlington, Texas.

The bankruptcy was not expected to have any noticeable effect on the day-to-day operations of the Rangers club, all vendors are expected to be paid, and all tickets already sold to the public are to be honored. The sale through the courts was expected to be completed in July prior to the trade deadline and the draft signing deadline. The bankruptcy hearing was first heard in court on May 25. The Rangers claimed there was "no viable option" except approval of the $575 million sale to Ryan and Greenberg, while a group of lenders claimed the club could get a better deal and that the deal presented by the Rangers does not make the most out of the team's assets. The attorney for the Rangers claimed that Hicks funded a $100 million operating loss since acquiring the team in 1999.

After a seven-month process, the Rangers' bankruptcy was finalized by an August 5 auction for ownership of the team by two parties, Rangers Baseball Express led by Ryan and Greenberg, and a partnership of Dallas Mavericks owner Mark Cuban and Crane. The auction was delayed by several hours due to objections raised by Greenberg and Ryan's group questioning the qualification of the Cuban-Crane bid, which was due no later than 8:00 pm on August 3. The auction, which was due to begin at 9:00 am on August 4, did not have its first opening bid determined until 2:50 pm. After no more than three bids by each party, Cuban withdrew from the bidding, and Greenberg and Ryan were declared the winners shortly after midnight. Due to the auction process, the purchase was for only the MLB club and the lease for the ballpark. Almost none of the original side deals with HSG and Hicks, which were rejected by several of the lenders to the Texas Rangers, were included.

== Regular season ==
=== Team leaders and awards ===
Pitching

Starts	Innings Pitched	Strike Outs	Wins	Saves
C. J. Wilson (33)	C. J. Wilson (204.1)	Colby Lewis (196)	C. J. Wilson (15)	Neftalí Feliz (40)

Batting

Batting average	Home runs	RBI	Runs	OPS
Josh Hamilton (.359)	Josh Hamilton (32)	Vlad Guerrero (115)	Michael Young (99)	Josh Hamilton (1.044)

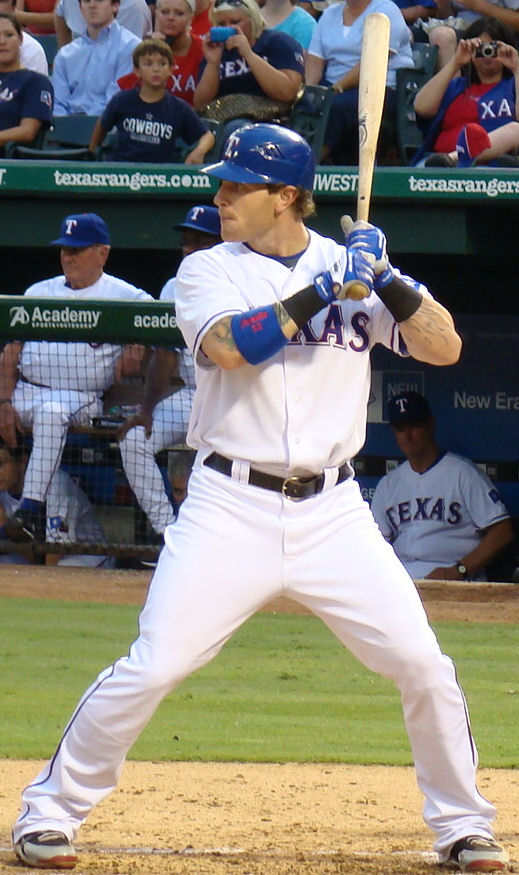
Hamilton would have a career high season winning the AL MVP, AL batting champion, the ALCS MVP and make his third All-Star game 2010.

- AL MVP – Josh Hamilton
- AL Rookie of the Year – Neftalí Feliz
- AL batting champion – Josh Hamilton
- Silver Slugger awards – Josh Hamilton (2), Vlad Guerrero (8)
- All-Star selections – Vladimir Guerrero (9), Josh Hamilton (3), Ian Kinsler (2), Neftalí Feliz (1), Elvis Andrus (1), Cliff Lee (2)
- ALCS MVP – Josh Hamilton
- IBWAA American League Manager of the Year – Ron Washington
- IBWAA AL Executive of the Year – Jon Daniels

Washington would finish in second place for Manager of the Year voting.

=== Spring training ===
Khalil Greene did not report to camp at the start of spring training, and was expected to miss significant time with the club. Greene has suffered in the past with anxiety issues which limited his playing time in 2009. Jon Daniels released a statement on Greene's absence from the club.

The Rangers fully support Khalil's decision to address this private matter. Per club policy, we will not comment on his medical situation. We have agreed to leave the door open for a continued relationship, if both Khalil and the team desire that in the future.

We have not put a timetable on a possible return to the club with the sole focus right now on doing what we can to assist him. The Rangers will continue to work with Khalil and his representatives to monitor his situation and interest in rejoining our organization.

Over the next few days, we expect that Khalil's status will be more clearly defined. We will also communicate the impact on the 40-man roster once we've walked through our administrative options.

— Jon Daniels, Dallas Morning News, January 22, 2010

The Rangers voided Greene's contract in February.

On March 9 the Rangers acquired Edwar Ramírez from the Yankees for cash considerations. Ramirez took the last spot of the 40-man roster that was vacated by Greene's departure. Ramírez would be traded to the Oakland A's 15 days later.

The starting rotation in previous years came down to the last minute to find out who would be the five starters at opening day, often having to get a free agent like Pedro Astacio, who signed in February prior to the 2005 season, or a trade like John Koronka and John Rheinecker, who were acquired at the end of March in 2006.

The 2010 season once again found this question needing to be answered, but unlike previous years, it was due to having too many potential candidates instead of scrambling to find a 5th starter or more. With a rotation starting off with Rich Harden, Scott Feldman, and Colby Lewis there were only two spots left, and with Tommy Hunter coming off a good 2009 showing he had the inside track for the number 4 spot. Remaining were Brandon McCarthy, who had still been unable to make a complete season healthy since 2006; Matt Harrison, who was coming back from surgery; Derek Holland, who started in the bullpen his rookie year of 2009 and finished the season in the rotation; Luis Mendoza, who only made one major league appearance in 2009 but had a strong showing in the winter leagues before spring training; Neftalí Feliz, the 100 mph (160 km/h) throwing reliever who was expected to be in the bullpen during 2010 if he didn't make the rotation; and C. J. Wilson, who had spent every year with the team in the bullpen since his rookie year in 2005.

Wilson, who has requested a chance to make the starting rotation since 2006, spoke about the upcoming season and his frustrations with the organization not giving him a chance to start prior to 2010.

It's no secret I don't think I should be limited to the set-up role. I have too many weapons. Here is the reality. It is real simple. There are not very many guys that have the stuff that I do that would be willing to sign here if they were free agents. There is no experienced pitcher that has my stuff that would sign here, historically.

— C. J. Wilson, Fort Worth Star Telegram, February 18, 2010

Wilson's comments were not well received by media or fans of the team. Team president Nolan Ryan stated CJ is a guy "who likes to communicate" and Ron Washington said the team would not address the situation.

This was not the first time comments made by Wilson caused problems for the talented left-hander. Wilson was a regular poster on the website lonestarball.com under the handle blueglovelefty, and in 2005 he stated that the average ballplayer is a douchebag. Wilson was later talked to by several team leaders on the Rangers, including Michael Young and Kevin Millwood. After the incident Wilson deleted his user ID and removed all posts from the website.

On March 17, 2010 Sports Illustrated's Jon Heyman reported Rangers manager Ron Washington failed an MLB drug test in 2009. First-time offending non-playing personnel who fail a drug test or admit to using drugs are not suspended and are subject to counseling and a substance-abuse program. After taking the test Washington called the MLB offices and informed them the test might come back positive. Washington then informed the front office of the Rangers about the test. Washington called a team meeting the morning of the story to inform the players about the failed test.

On March 12 second baseman Ian Kinsler suffered a high ankle sprain. The injury forced the All-Star to start the 2010 season on the disabled list. On March 27 the Rangers traded for Andrés Blanco from the Chicago Cubs for a player to be named later. Blanco will be the utility infielder backing up second base, third base, and shortstop, but he will be the opening day second baseman while Kinsler is on the disabled list. Joaquín Árias will be the utility infielder until Kinsler recovers from injuries.

On April 1 the Rangers claimed Ryan Garko off waivers from the Seattle Mariners.

=== April ===
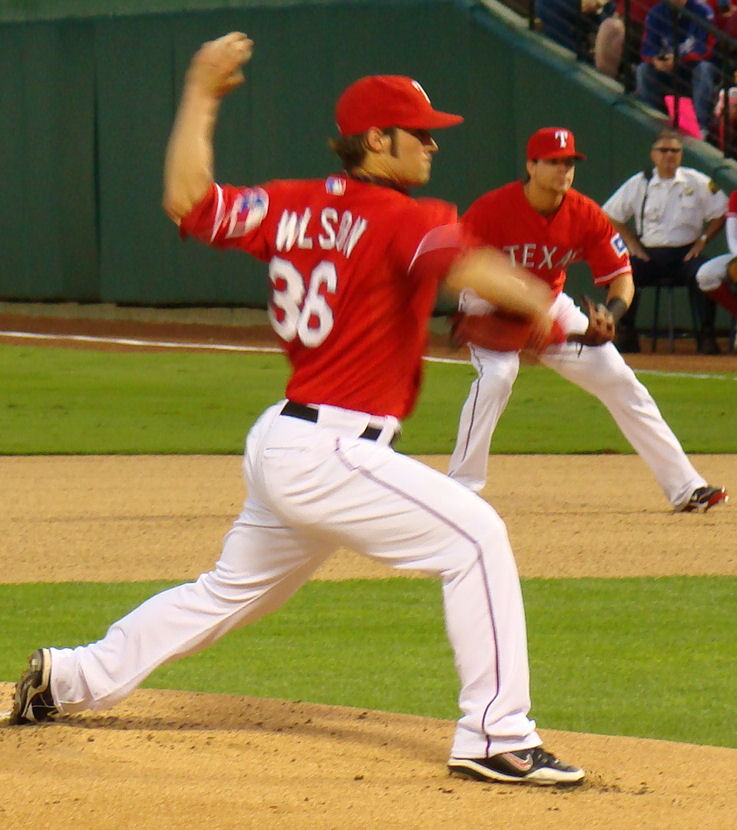
Starting in the majors for the first time since his rookie year, Wilson would prove to be one of the best pitchers in the league and would start the second post-season game for the Rangers.

Record (month, season): 11–12

Starting rotation: Scott Feldman, Rich Harden, C. J. Wilson, Colby Lewis, Matt Harrison

The Rangers ended the month with their 4th consecutive April under .500 tied for 3rd place in the division and 1/2 a game from 1st.

Scott Feldman was named the opening day starter for the April 5 home opener against the Blue Jays. Feldman was the first non-returning player originally signed/drafted by the Rangers to start opening day since Kenny Rogers in 1995 and the first to start the home opener since RA Dickey in 2004.

After two blown saves in the first week of the season, Frank Francisco was replaced as the closer by Neftalí Feliz.

In a need to increase production from the top of the line-up center fielder Julio Borbon and shortstop Elvis Andrus switched positions in the batting order with Andrus leading off and Borbon hitting 9th.

On April 22 the Rangers sent first baseman Chris Davis to AAA for the second time in two years and called up rookie Justin Smoak to join the team at home against the Detroit Tigers. Smoak would set a franchise record by recording at least one walk in each of his first four major league games.

Right fielder Nelson Cruz, who had led most of the Rangers offensive production in the first month, injured his hamstring and was placed on the DL on April 27. The following day the Rangers optioned catcher Taylor Teagarden to AAA and recalled catcher Max Ramírez and outfielder Craig Gentry. Catcher Jarrod Saltalamacchia was removed from the 15-day DL and optioned to AAA as well.

Ian Kinsler, who missed most of spring training and 29 days in April with a high ankle sprain, made his 2010 season debut against the Seattle Mariners on April 30. To make room for his addition off the 15-day DL second baseman/utility infielder Joaquín Árias was placed on the 15-day DL with a strained back.

=== May ===
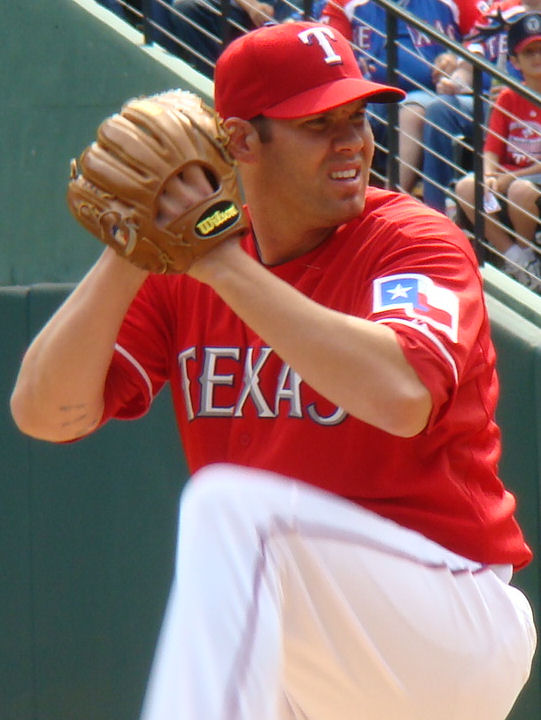
Lewis re-signed with the Rangers after spending two years playing in Japan. He would be the deciding pitcher in each of the Rangers first two home playoff wins.

Record (month, year) 15–12, 26–24

Starting rotation: C. J. Wilson, Rich Harden, Scott Feldman, Colby Lewis, Matt Harrison, Derek Holland

The Rangers spent 26 days of May either tied or in sole possession of 1st place in the West but would lose 6 of their last 7 and end the month in 2nd place behind the Oakland A's.

On May 12, Derek Holland made his first start of the season after being called up from Triple-A Oklahoma. He had been 4–1 with a 0.93 ERA in his time at Triple-A. He pitched 6 innings without allowing a run while striking out 7 and walking 1, picking up his first win of 2010. Matt Harrison was placed on the DL to make room for Holland's call-up.

On May 13, C. J. Wilson became the first pitcher in the franchise's history to begin the season with 7 straight quality starts. In the same game Wilson also set a new franchise record for most consecutive innings pitched without giving up a home run. The Rangers won the game 2–1 in the 12th inning.

On May 14 Nelson Cruz was reactivated from the DL. Ryan Garko was placed on waivers to make room for Cruz. It was the first time in the season the line-up would include both Cruz and Kinsler. The Rangers scored 10 runs in the game against the Toronto Blue Jays but would lose the game.

Nelson Cruz won the honor as player of the week from May 17–23. Cruz pulled his left hamstring on the last at bat in a loss against the Royals on May 26. This was the 2nd time Cruz would go on the DL for a hamstring, the previous was for his right hamstring.

Derek Holland would make 4 starts and 1 relief appearance in May. He suffered from inflammation in his left (throwing) arm on May 30 and left the game during the 2nd inning. The game was being broadcast by ESPN who had a microphone on the home plate umpire. During the injury visit to the mound Holland's voice was heard saying he "couldn't feel the ball" in his hand. He was placed on the DL by the next game.

=== June ===
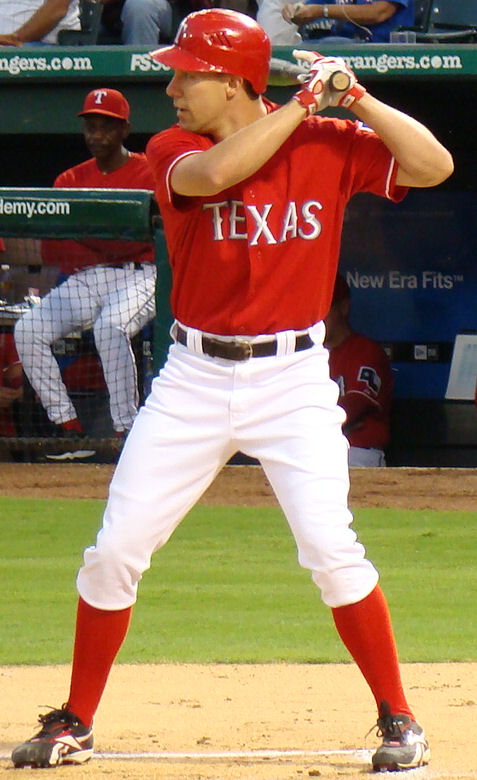
Injuries to Cruz and Hamilton would allow David Murphy to play in over 130 games, and his hitting (.291/.358/.449) would be one of the highest on the team.

Record (month, year) 21–6, 47–30

Starting rotation: Rich Harden, Scott Feldman, C. J. Wilson, Colby Lewis, Tommy Hunter, Dustin Nippert, Omar Beltré

The Rangers compiled their best monthly record in franchise history high-marked by an 11-game winning streak, the second best in franchise history and highest since 1992. The Rangers spent every day except one in first place for the division and ended the month of June tied with the Yankees for the best record in baseball.

Hamilton and Guerrero's offensive production for the month put both players on the league leader boards with Hamilton and Guerrero tied for 5th in home runs, Hamilton at 4th in batting average followed by Guerrero at 5th, and Hamilton at 4th in hits, Guerrero at 10th, and Young tied for 5th in hits as well. Guerrero finished the month tied for 1st in RBIs at 68. Feliz also finished the month tied for 2nd in saves.

The Rangers called up reliever Pedro Strop after placing Holland on the disabled list. The Rangers recalled pitcher Tommy Hunter to take the 5th spot in the rotation, Strop was reassigned to AAA on June 5. Hunter pitched a complete game in his 2010 debut earning a win against the Tampa Bay Rays on June 5.

Rich Harden was placed on the DL after his June 11 game and replaced on the active roster by Alexi Ogando.

Josh Hamilton and Colby Lewis shared the award for player of the week from June 7–13.

Michael Young became the all-time hit leader in club history on June 16 passing Iván Rodríguez.

Cruz returned from the DL on June 22, Craig Gentry was optioned back to AAA for his return.

Alexi Ogando became the 3rd relief pitcher since 1900 to record a win in each of his first three appearances.

Omar Beltré made his major league debut joining the other formerly exiled Dominican Republican Ogando as teammates again.

Beltre started the last game of the month against the Angels. The Rangers also completed a trade with the San Francisco Giants sending Chris Ray and a PTBNL and receiving Bengie Molina and cash considerations. The trade was not completed before the start of the game, and the Rangers sent Matt Harrison to AAA to make room for Beltre.

Hamilton won player of the month for June.

=== July ===
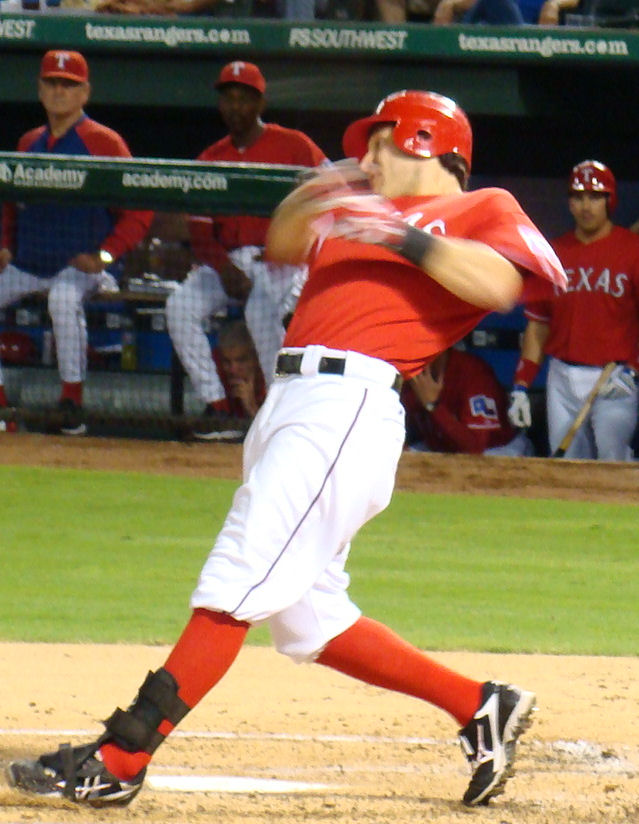
Although Kinsler missed significant playing time in 2010, he would still represent the Rangers with his second All-Star appearance.

Record (month, year) 14–13, 61–43

Rotation C. J. Wilson, Colby Lewis, Tommy Hunter, Scott Feldman, Omar Beltré, Cliff Lee, Rich Harden

The Rangers lost four games in a row to the Baltimore Orioles going into the All-Star break, however they would win their next four series in a row, including going 4–2 against the Angels and sending them into third place in the division.

The Rangers completed one of their biggest trades in franchise history on July 9 when they sent 2009 first-round draft pick Justin Smoak, minor leaguers Blake Beavan, Josh Lueke, and Matt Lawson to the Seattle Mariners for CY Young-award winner Cliff Lee, and Mark Lowe plus cash. Lee would be the first former Cy Young winner to appear in a Rangers uniform since Gaylord Perry. Chris Davis was recalled from AAA to replace Smoak at first base.

On July 16 against the Red Sox Bengie Molina became the first catcher in MLB history to hit a grand slam and for the cycle in the same game.

Hamilton and Guerrero were voted as starters for the All-Star game and were joined by Kinsler, Andrus, and Feliz. The Rangers also added starting pitcher Lee to the All-Star roster after acquiring him from Seattle.

=== August ===
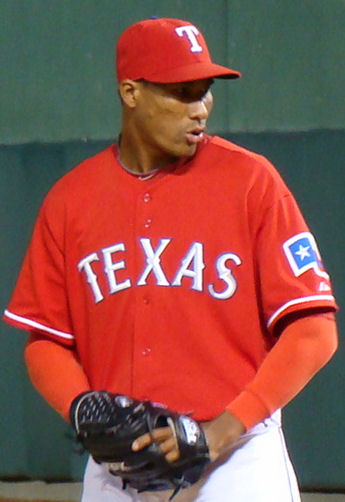
After being denied reentry into the United States for 5 years, Ogando would be a key member of the bullpen in his rookie year.

Record (month, year): 13–15, 74–58

Rotation: Cliff Lee, Colby Lewis, C. J. Wilson, Tommy Hunter, Rich Harden, Derek Holland

The Rangers finished the month of August with their worst record of the season going two games under 500. Despite a losing record for the month, the Rangers division lead did not drop below 7 games above the Oakland A's, and the Rangers ended to month 8.5 games ahead of second place.

After making only one start in July, Harden would return to the DL following his August 7 game against Oakland. Harden would make two more starts in the month, throwing only 13 1/3 innings and being sent to the bullpen at the end of the month.

August would also be a tough month for the other Rangers ace Cliff Lee, whose record for the month was 1–6. Lee was also accused by ESPN radio host Colin Cowherd claiming people close to Lee said he wanted to sign with the Yankees or another elite team, that Lee didn't care about Texas, and Cowherd also accused Lee of mailing it in against Baltimore on August 21, a game in which Lee gave up 8 runs. After the August 22 game Lee told reporters "It's a lie. Write that. Are you writing? Write that it's a lie. I did not say that and nobody close to me would say that. Either say who the source is or shut up because I am saying it is not true." Following the events in Baltimore Lee would lose his next two games before reporting that he was having muscle pain in his back and would receive an injection.

Oft injured all-stars Cruz and Kinsler spent more time on the DL, Kinsler would not play a single game in the month of August following a late July injury, and Cruz missed a total of fifteen games.

On August 1 former starting catcher Jarrod Saltalamacchia was traded to the Red Sox for Roman Mendez, Chris McGuiness, a player to be named. Outfielder Jeff Francoeur was acquired on August 31 from the Mets for infielder Arias. The Rangers also received cash in the trade.

Rookie Michael Kirkman would make his major league debut on August 21. Ranked as the 15th best prospect by Jamey Newberg prior to the start of the season, Kirkman would pitch 7 2/3 innings in the month, striking out eight and giving up no runs in August 5 games.

On August 23, the Rangers nearly combined for a no-hitter against the Minnesota Twins when Rich Harden pitched 6 and 2/3 innings of no-hit ball but was pulled after 111 pitches. Matt Harrison got the last out of the inning, and Darren O'Day pitched a perfect eighth before Neftalí Feliz gave up the first hit of the game with one out in the ninth to Joe Mauer.

=== September–October ===
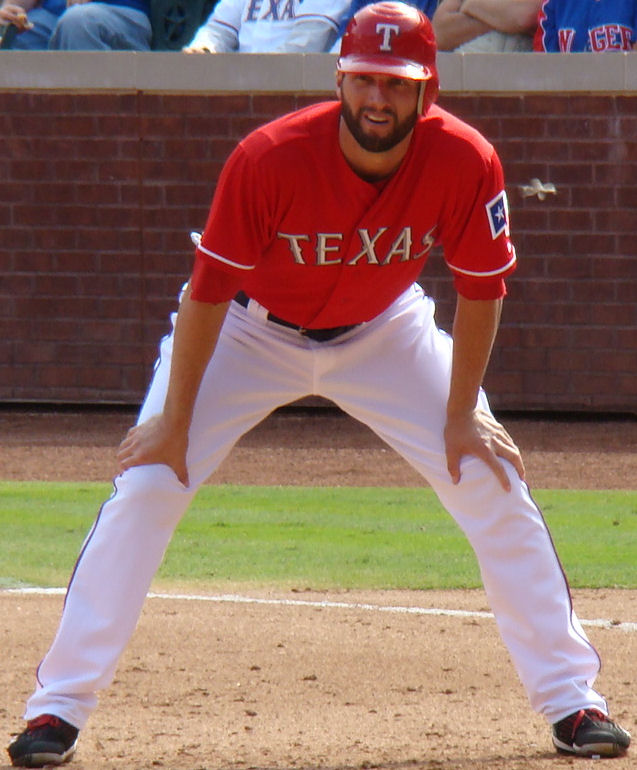
Added on the last day for post season roster eligibility as an additional right-handed bat, Francoeur would hit .333 in 14 games to finish the season.

Record (month, year) 16–14, 90–72

Rotation:Tommy Hunter, Derek Holland, Colby Lewis, C. J. Wilson, Scott Feldman, Cliff Lee, Rich Harden

The Rangers' lead peaked at 11 games after clinching the division, setting a new franchise high.

Hamilton injured himself after colliding with the outfield wall making a catch on September 4. it was the second time in consecutive years he would miss significant playing time after crashing into a wall making a catch. X-rays later showed Hamilton had cracked two ribs from the collision. Although the injury itself did not prevent Hamilton from playing, Hamilton would continue to miss time due to pain from the injury and, due to Hamilton's drug past, lasted longer because he is unable to take pain medication. Hamilton would not return until the season series finale against the Angels.

The Rangers would sweep the New York Yankees in a mid-September meeting. It was the first time the Rangers swept the Yankees since 2003, and the first time to do so at home since 1996.

On September 22 Feliz would tie the major league record for saves by a rookie in a single season. Feliz would end the season with 40 saves.

On September 25, the Rangers would clinch the division against the A's. On the same day Young would also set a new record by being the first major leaguer to start over 282 games at second base, short stop, and third base.

Rangers starters Wilson and Lewis would each reach 200 plus innings in their last start of the season. It would be the first time two Rangers starters would reach the mark since 2006. With Lee's total innings pitched, it would be the first time the Rangers had three starters who would reach 200 plus innings since 2002.

=== Game log ===
Legend
Rangers Win	Rangers Loss	Game postponed	Clinched playoff spot

2010 Game Log: 90–72 (Home: 51–30; Away: 39–42)
April: 11–12

#	Date	Opponent	Score	Win	Loss	Save	Attendance	Record	Streak
1	April 5	Blue Jays	5–4	Francisco (1–0)	Frasor (0–1)	—	50,299	1–0	W1
2	April 7	Blue Jays	4–7	Tallet (1–0)	Nippert (0–1)	Frasor (1)	22,890	1–1	L1
3	April 8	Blue Jays	1–3	Janssen (1–0)	Francisco (1–1)	Frasor (2)	14,707	1–2	L2
4	April 9	Mariners	6–2	Lewis (1–0)	Vargas (0–1)	—	25,271	2–2	W1
5	April 10	Mariners	3–4	Lowe (1–1)	Francisco (1–2)	Aardsma (2)	26,861	2–3	L1
6	April 11	Mariners	9–2	Feldman (1–0)	Snell (0–1)	—	26,846	3–3	W1
7	April 12	@ Indians	4–2 (10)	Francisco (2–2)	Wright (0–1)	Feliz (1)	42,061	4–3	W2
8	April 14	@ Indians	6–2	Lewis (2–0)	Masterson (0–1)	Feliz (2)	10,071	5–3	W3
9	April 15	@ Indians	2–3	Huff (1–1)	Harrison (0–1)	—	10,198	5–4	L1
10	April 16	@ Yankees	1–5 (6)	Sabathia (2–0)	Wilson (0–1)	—	42,145	5–5	L2
11	April 17	@ Yankees	3–7	Burnett (2–0)	Feldman (1–1)	—	44,963	5–6	L3
12	April 18	@ Yankees	2–5	Pettitte (2–0)	Harden (0–1)	Rivera (5)	44,121	5–7	L4
13	April 20	@ Red Sox	6–7	Papelbon (1–1)	Francisco (2–3)	—	37,614	5–8	L5
14	April 21	@ Red Sox	7–8 (12)	Okajima (2–1)	Nippert (0–2)	—	37,518	5–9	L6
15	April 22	@ Red Sox	3–0	Wilson (1–1)	Buchholz (1–2)	Oliver (1)	37,417	6–9	W1
16	April 23	Tigers	5–4	Feliz (1–0)	Ni (0–1)	—	26,445	7–9	W2
17	April 24	Tigers	4–8	Bonine (2–0)	Feldman (1–2)	—	45,752	7–10	L1
18	April 25	Tigers	8–4	Lewis (3–0)	Porcello (1–2)	—	31,211	8–10	W1
19	April 26	Tigers	6–8	Coke (3–0)	Feliz (1–1)	Valverde (6)	16,381	8–11	L1
20	April 27	White Sox	4–2	Wilson (2–1)	Buehrle (2–3)	Francisco (1)	14,589	9–11	W1
21	April 28	White Sox	6–5	Harden (1–1)	Peavy (0–2)	Feliz (3)	20,432	10–11	W2
22	April 29	White Sox	5–7	Floyd (1–2)	O'Day (0–1)	—	17,778	10–12	L1
23	April 30	@ Mariners	2–0 (12)	Francisco (3–3)	League (3–2)	Feliz (4)	34,055	11–12	W1

May: 15–12

#	Date	Opponent	Score	Win	Loss	Save	Attendance	Record	Streak
24	May 1	@ Mariners	6–3					12–12	W2
25	May 2	@ Mariners	3–1 (11)					13–12	W3
26	May 3	@ Athletics	4–2					14–12	W4
27	May 4	@ Athletics	6–7					14–13	L1
28	May 5	@ Athletics	1–4					14–14	L2
29	May 6	Royals	13–12					15–14	W1
30	May 7	Royals	4–1					16–14	W2
31	May 8	Royals	3–2					17–14	W3
32	May 9	Royals	6–4					18–14	W4
33	May 11	Athletics	6–7					18–15	L1
34	May 12	Athletics	10–1					19–15	W1
35	May 13	Athletics	2–1 (12)					20–15	W2
36	May 14	@ Blue Jays	10–16					20–16	L1
37	May 15	@ Blue Jays	0–6					20–17	L2
38	May 16	@ Blue Jays	2–5					20–18	L3
39	May 17	Angels	4–3					21–18	W1
40	May 18	Angels	8–7					22–18	W2
41	May 19	Orioles	4–3					23–18	W3
42	May 20	Orioles	13–7					24–18	W4
43	May 21	Cubs	2–1					25–18	W5
44	May 22	Cubs	4–5					25–19	L1
45	May 23	Cubs	4–5					25–20	L2
46	May 25	@ Royals	8–7					26–20	W1
47	May 26	@ Royals	2–5					26–21	L1
48	May 28	@ Twins	1–2					26–22	L2
49	May 29	@ Twins	3–8					26–23	L3
50	May 30	@ Twins	3–6					26–24	L4

June: 21–6

#	Date	Opponent	Score	Win	Loss	Save	Attendance	Record	Streak
51	June 1	@ White Sox	9–6					27–24	W1
52	June 2	@ White Sox	9–5					28–24	W2
53	June 3	@ White Sox	3–4					28–25	L1
54	June 4	Rays	9–6					29–25	W1
55	June 5	Rays	6–1					30–25	W2
56	June 6	Rays	5–9					30–26	L1
57	June 7	Mariners	2–4					30–27	L2
58	June 8	Mariners	7–1					31–27	W1
59	June 9	Mariners	12–2					32–27	W2
60	June 10	Mariners	12–3					33–27	W3
61	June 11	@ Brewers	2–6					33–28	L1
62	June 12	@ Brewers	4–3					34–28	W1
63	June 13	@ Brewers	7–2					35–28	W2
64	June 15	@ Marlins	3–2					36–28	W3
65	June 16	@ Marlins	6–3					37–28	W4
66	June 17	@ Marlins	6–4					38–28	W5
67	June 18	@ Astros	9–3					39–28	W6
68	June 19	@ Astros	5–1					40–28	W7
69	June 20	@ Astros	5–4 (10)					41–28	W8
70	June 22	Pirates	6–3					42–28	W9
71	June 23	Pirates	13–3					43–28	W10
72	June 24	Pirates	6–5					44–28	W11
73	June 25	Astros	4–7					44–29	L1
74	June 26	Astros	7–2					45–29	W1
75	June 27	Astros	10–1					46–29	W2
76	June 29	@ Angels	5–6					46–30	L1
77	June 30	@ Angels	6–4					47–30	W1

July: 14–13

#	Date	Opponent	Score	Win	Loss	Save	Attendance	Record	Streak
78	July 1	@ Angels	1–2					47–31	L1
79	July 2	White Sox	3–5					47–32	L2
80	July 3	White Sox	3–1					48–32	W1
81	July 4	White Sox	3–5					48–33	L1
82	July 5	Indians	3–9					48–34	L2
83	July 6	Indians	12–1					49–34	W1
84	July 7	Indians	4–3					50–34	W2
85	July 8	Orioles	4–6					50–35	L1
86	July 9	Orioles	6–7					50–36	L2
87	July 10	Orioles	1–6					50–37	L3
88	July 11	Orioles	1–4					50–38	L4
89	July 15	@ Red Sox	7–2					51–38	W1
90	July 16	@ Red Sox	8–4					52–38	W2
91	July 17	@ Red Sox	2–3 (11)					52–39	L1
92	July 18	@ Red Sox	4–2					53–39	W1
93	July 19	@ Tigers	8–6 (14)					54–39	W2
94	July 20	@ Tigers	8–0					55–39	W3
95	July 21	@ Tigers	1–4					55–40	L1
96	July 22	Angels	3–2					56–40	W1
97	July 23	Angels	1–0					57–40	W2
98	July 24	Angels	2–6					57–41	L1
99	July 25	Angels	6–4					58–41	W1
100	July 27	Athletics	3–1 (10)					59–41	W2
101	July 28	Athletics	1–3					59–42	L1
102	July 29	Athletics	7–4					60–42	W1
103	July 30	@ Angels	7–9					60–43	L1
104	July 31	@ Angels	2–1					61–43	W1

August: 13–15

#	Date	Opponent	Score	Win	Loss	Save	Attendance	Record	Streak
105	August 1	@ Angels	1–4					61–44	L1
106	August 3	@ Mariners	2–3					61–45	L2
107	August 4	@ Mariners	11–6					62–45	W1
108	August 5	@ Mariners	6–0					63–45	W2
109	August 6	@ Athletics	5–1					64–45	W3
110	August 7	@ Athletics	2–6					64–46	L1
111	August 8	@ Athletics	2–3					64–47	L2
112	August 10	Yankees	4–3 (10)					65–47	W1
113	August 11	Yankees	6–7					65–48	L1
114	August 13	Red Sox	10–9 (11)					66–48	W1
115	August 14	Red Sox	1–3					66–49	L1
116	August 15	Red Sox	7–3					67–49	W1
117	August 16	@ Rays	4–6					67–50	L1
118	August 17	@ Rays	1–10					67–51	L2
119	August 18	@ Rays	6–8					67–52	L3
120	August 19	@ Orioles	0–4					67–53	L4
121	August 20	@ Orioles	2–0					68–53	W1
122	August 21	@ Orioles	6–8					68–54	L1
123	August 22	@ Orioles	6–4					69–54	W1
124	August 23	Twins	4–0					70–54	W2
125	August 24	Twins	4–3					71–54	W3
126	August 25	Twins	4–3					72–54	W4
127	August 26	Twins	4–6					72–55	L1
128	August 27	Athletics	7–3					73–55	W1
129	August 28	Athletics	0–5					73–56	L1
130	August 29	Athletics	2–8					73–57	L2
131	August 30	@ Royals	3–0					74–57	W1
132	August 31	@ Royals	9–10					74–58	L1

September: 15–12

#	Date	Opponent	Score	Win	Loss	Save	Attendance	Record	Streak
133	September 1	@ Royals	4–3					75–58	W1
134	September 3	@ Twins	3–4					75–59	L1
135	September 4	@ Twins	4–12					75–60	L2
136	September 5	@ Twins	5–6					75–61	L3
137	September 6	@ Blue Jays	2–7					75–62	L4
138	September 7	@ Blue Jays	5–8					75–63	L5
139	September 8	@ Blue Jays	8–1					76–63	W1
140	September 9	@ Blue Jays	4–2					77–63	W2
141	September 10	Yankees	6–5 (13)					78–63	W3
142	September 11	Yankees	7–6					79–63	W4
143	September 12	Yankees	4–1					80–63	W5
144	September 14	Tigers	11–4					81–63	W6
145	September 15	Tigers	11–7					82–63	W7
146	September 17	@ Mariners	1–2					82–64	L1
147	September 18	@ Mariners	6–1					83–64	W1
148	September 19	@ Mariners	1–2					83–65	L1
149	September 20	@ Angels	4–7					83–66	L2
150	September 21	@ Angels	0–2					83–67	L3
151	September 22	@ Angels	2–1 (12)					84–67	W1
152	September 23	@ Athletics	0–5					84–68	L1
153	September 24	@ Athletics	10–3					85–68	W1
154	September 25	@ Athletics	4–3					86–68	W2
155	September 26	@ Athletics	16–9					87–68	W3
156	September 27	Mariners	5–7					87–69	L1
157	September 28	Mariners	1–3					87–70	L2
158	September 29	Mariners	6–5					88–70	W1
159	September 30	Angels	3–2					89–70	W2

October: 1–2

#	Date	Opponent	Score	Win	Loss	Save	Attendance	Record	Streak
160	October 1	Angels	4–5 (11)					89–71	L1
161	October 2	Angels	6–2					90–71	W1
162	October 3	Angels	2–6					90–72	L1

== Player stats ==
=== Batting ===
Note: G = Games played; AB = At bats; R = Runs; H = Hits; 2B = Doubles; 3B = Triples; HR = Home runs; RBI = Runs batted in; SB = Stolen bases: BB = Walks; AVG = Batting average; SLG = Slugging average

Player	G	AB	R	H	2B	3B	HR	RBI	SB	BB	AVG	SLG
Michael Young	157	656	99	186	36	3	21	91	4	50	.284	.444
Vladimir Guerrero	152	593	83	178	27	1	29	115	4	35	.300	.496
Elvis Andrus	148	588	88	156	15	3	0	35	32	64	.265	.301
Josh Hamilton	133	518	95	186	40	3	32	100	8	43	.359	.633
Julio Borbón	137	438	60	121	11	4	3	42	15	19	.276	.340
David Murphy	138	419	54	122	26	2	12	65	14	45	.291	.449
Nelson Cruz	108	399	60	127	31	3	22	78	17	38	.318	.576
Ian Kinsler	103	391	73	112	20	1	9	45	15	56	.286	.412
Matt Treanor	82	237	22	50	6	1	5	27	1	22	.211	.308
Justin Smoak	70	235	29	49	10	0	8	34	1	38	.209	.353
Bengie Molina	57	175	10	42	6	1	2	19	0	10	.240	.320
Andrés Blanco	68	166	17	46	10	1	0	13	0	11	.277	.349
Mitch Moreland	47	145	20	37	4	0	9	25	3	25	.255	.469
Chris Davis	45	120	7	23	9	0	1	4	3	15	.192	.292
Jorge Cantú	30	98	9	23	4	1	1	2	0	6	.235	.327
Joaquín Arias	50	98	18	27	5	1	0	9	1	2	.276	.347
Taylor Teagarden	28	71	10	11	1	0	4	6	0	8	.155	.338
Max Ramírez	28	69	8	15	3	0	2	8	0	12	.217	.348
Jeff Francoeur	15	53	9	18	2	0	2	11	0	1	.340	.491
Christian Guzmán	15	46	4	7	1	0	0	1	0	3	.152	.174
Ryan Garko	15	33	0	3	0	0	0	3	1	1	.091	.091
Craig Gentry	20	33	4	7	0	0	0	3	1	1	.212	.212
Esteban Germán	13	13	5	3	0	0	0	1	4	3	.231	.231
Brandon Boggs	4	7	0	0	0	0	0	0	0	1	.000	.000
Alex Cora	4	7	0	2	0	0	0	0	0	0	.286	.286
Jarrod Saltalamacchia	2	5	0	1	0	0	0	1	0	0	.200	.200
Pitcher totals	162	22	3	4	1	0	0	2	0	0	.182	.227
Team totals	162	5635	787	1556	265	25	162	740	123	511	.276	.419

=== Pitching ===
Note: W = Wins; L = Losses; ERA = Earned run average; G = Games pitched; GS = Games started; SV = Saves; IP = Innings pitched; H = Hits allowed; R = Runs allowed; ER = Earned runs allowed; BB = Walks allowed; SO = Strikeouts

Player	W	L	ERA	G	GS	SV	IP	H	R	ER	BB	SO
C.J. Wilson	15	8	3.35	33	33	0	204.1	161	83	76	93	170
Colby Lewis	12	13	3.72	32	32	0	201.0	174	90	83	65	196
Scott Feldman	7	11	5.48	29	22	0	141.1	181	98	86	45	75
Tommy Hunter	13	4	3.73	23	22	0	128.0	126	55	53	33	68
Cliff Lee	4	6	3.98	15	15	0	108.2	103	53	48	12	96
Rich Harden	5	5	5.58	20	18	0	92.0	91	61	57	62	75
Matt Harrison	3	2	4.71	37	6	2	78.1	80	45	41	39	46
Neftalí Feliz	4	3	2.73	70	0	40	69.1	43	21	21	18	71
Darren O'Day	6	2	2.03	72	0	0	62.0	43	15	14	12	45
Darren Oliver	1	2	2.48	64	0	1	61.2	53	20	17	15	65
Derek Holland	3	4	4.08	14	10	0	57.1	55	30	26	24	54
Dustin Nippert	4	5	4.29	38	2	0	56.2	61	28	27	34	47
Frank Francisco	6	4	3.76	56	0	2	52.2	49	23	22	18	60
Alexi Ogando	4	1	1.30	44	0	0	41.2	31	6	6	16	39
Chris Ray	2	0	3.41	35	0	1	31.2	24	12	12	16	16
Doug Mathis	1	1	6.04	13	0	0	22.1	30	15	15	11	10
Michael Kirkman	0	0	1.65	14	0	0	16.1	9	3	3	10	16
Pedro Strop	0	0	10.13	15	0	0	10.2	17	12	12	11	11
Clay Rapada	0	0	4.00	13	0	0	9.0	6	4	4	7	5
Omar Beltré	0	1	9.00	2	2	0	7.0	9	7	7	7	9
Mark Lowe	0	0	12.00	3	0	0	3.0	7	4	4	1	5
Guillermo Moscoso	0	0	27.00	1	0	0	0.2	2	2	2	2	2
Team totals	90	72	3.93	162	162	46	1455.1	1355	687	636	551	1181

=== Postseason ===
The Texas Rangers, at 90–72, advanced to the postseason for the fourth time in franchise history, and the first time since 1999. Their opponent in the ALDS were the Tampa Bay Rays. Their opponent for the ALCS were the New York Yankees

==== ALDS vs. Rays ====
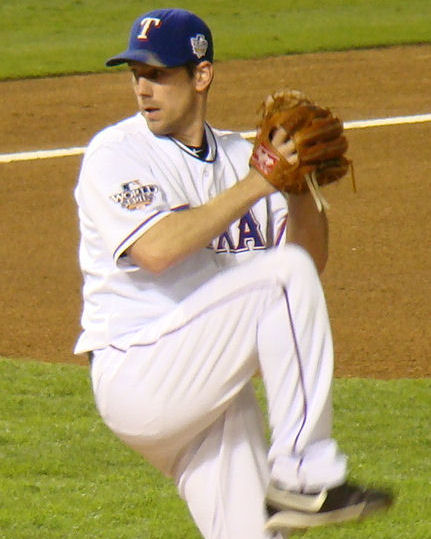
Acquired by the Rangers for a postseason push, Lee would win 3 games and set a record for most 10+ strike out games in the postseason.

The Rangers won the ALDS in 5 games versus the Rays. Each team won only away games, and it was the first time a divisional round has ever been won by only the away teams. The game 1 win was Lee's first win in Tampa Bay of the year, it was also the Rangers' first win in Tampa as well.

Prior to game 2 ESPN's Tim Kurkjian said C. J. Wilson was the best #2 pitcher in the American League playoffs. Game 2 would not be without controversy as Michael Young appeared to swing at a two-strike pitch. The third-base umpire ruled Young had checked his swing, and Young would hit the next pitch for a three-run home run.

Prior to game 5 in Tampa Bay the last time a runner scored from second base on an infield grounder was 1970. The Rangers would score from second on infield grounders twice in the game.

After Lee's two starts there would only be 8 games in playoff history when a pitcher would have 10+ strikeouts and no walks. Lee has pitched 4 of those games. Lee also tied the Division Series record of 21 strikeouts set by Kevin Brown in 1998 with the San Diego Padres. Lee's 16 innings without a walk set a new ALDS record.

Cruz and Kinsler would also hit 3 home runs each in the series. The last time two teammates each hit 3 or more home runs in the same playoff series was in 1928 when Babe Ruth and Lou Gehrig did it for the New York Yankees.

Texas won the series, 3–2.

Game	Date	Score	Location	Time	Attendance
1	October 6	Texas Rangers – 5, Tampa Bay Rays – 1	Tropicana Field	3:06	35,474
2	October 7	Texas Rangers – 6, Tampa Bay Rays – 0	Tropicana Field	3:10	35,535
3	October 9	Tampa Bay Rays – 6, Texas Rangers – 3	Rangers Ballpark in Arlington	3:38	51,746
4	October 10	Tampa Bay Rays – 5, Texas Rangers – 2	Rangers Ballpark in Arlington	3:22	49,218
5	October 12	Texas Rangers – 5, Tampa Bay Rays – 1	Tropicana Field	3:00	41,845

==== ALCS vs. Yankees ====
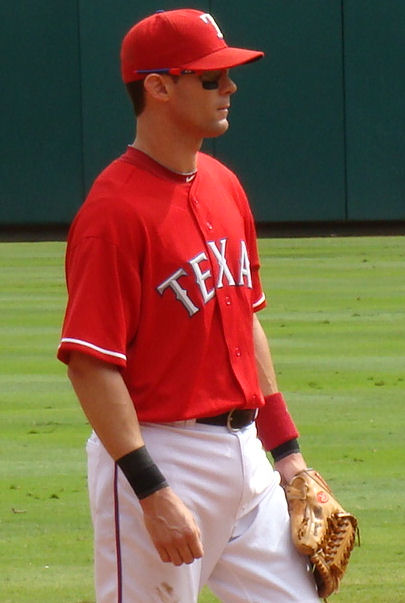
Young would play in 1,508 games before making his postseason debut in 2010.

The Rangers would win the ALCS in 6 games after splitting the first two games in Texas and winning two in New York. Colby Lewis would not only be the first Rangers pitcher to win a home playoff game, doing so in game 2, but would also win the second home playoff victory in franchise history in the same series, clinching the American League championship in Game 6. The Rangers advanced to the World Series for the first time.

The Rangers' first three batters of the series would each get on base and score after Josh Hamilton hit a three-run home run in the bottom of the first inning of game 1. It was only the second time in playoff history a team had done so. The Rangers game 2 win broke an 0–10 record versus the Yankees in playoff games. Prior to his one walk in game 3, Lee amassed 30 post-season strikeouts between walks, an MLB record. Lee is also the first pitcher to get 10+ strikeouts three times in the same post-season.

Texas won the series, 4–2.

Game	Date	Score	Location	Time	Attendance
1	October 15	New York Yankees – 6, Texas Rangers – 5	Rangers Ballpark in Arlington	3:50	50,930
2	October 16	New York Yankees – 2, Texas Rangers – 7	Rangers Ballpark in Arlington	3:52	50,362
3	October 18	Texas Rangers – 8, New York Yankees – 0	Yankee Stadium	3:18	49,480
4	October 19	Texas Rangers – 10, New York Yankees – 3	Yankee Stadium	4:05	49,977
5	October 20	Texas Rangers – 2, New York Yankees – 7	Yankee Stadium	3:48	49,832
6	October 22	New York Yankees – 1, Texas Rangers – 6	Rangers Ballpark in Arlington	2:57	51,404

==== 2010 World Series ====
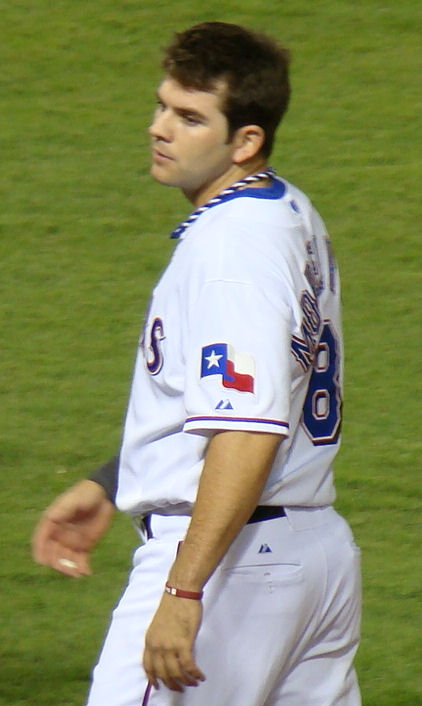
Mitch Moreland would lead the team in hits, batting average, and slugging against the Giants.

While the Rangers starting pitching would continue to be strong in the World Series, giving up only 33 runs in 97 2/3 innings, the Rangers offense would only record 29 total hits in the 5 games. The Giants would score as many runs as the Rangers had hits in the series. The Rangers would also be shut out by the Giants in two of the games. It was the first time a team had been shut out in two world series games since the 1966 series.

A bullpen meltdown in game 2 culminated by 4 walks in a row allowed the Giants to take a commanding lead scoring 7 runs in the 8th innings.

The lone victory for the Rangers would be game 3. Colby Lewis would win his third home playoff victory after rookie first baseman Mitch Moreland took advantage of a 9-pitch at-bat with a 3-run home run. Moreland would be the only bright spot in the Rangers offense against the Giants finishing with a .462 batting average. No other Rangers batter would get 6 hits in the series, and the second best would need 7 more at bats to get to 5 hits. Neftalí Feliz would get the save. It was Feliz' only save opportunity in the entire postseason.

The bullpen troubles would continue to grow worse for the Rangers when in game 4 setup reliever Alexi Ogando would leave the game with a strain.

San Francisco won the series, 4–1.

Game	Date	Score	Location	Time	Attendance
1	October 27	Texas Rangers – 7, San Francisco Giants – 11	AT&T Park	3:36	43,601
2	October 28	Texas Rangers – 0, San Francisco Giants – 9	AT&T Park	3:17	43,622
3	October 30	San Francisco Giants – 2, Texas Rangers – 4	Rangers Ballpark in Arlington	2:51	52,419
4	October 31	San Francisco Giants – 4, Texas Rangers – 0	Rangers Ballpark in Arlington	3:09	51,920
5	November 1	San Francisco Giants – 3, Texas Rangers – 1	Rangers Ballpark in Arlington	2:32	52,045

=== Farm system ===
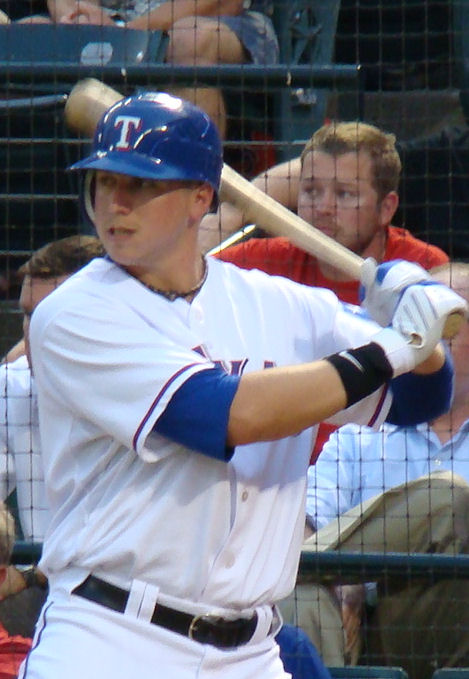
Former first round pick Justin Smoak would be the key trade piece when the Rangers acquired Cliff Lee from Seattle.

Among baseball publications the top four Ranger prospects are all agreed upon, with Neftalí Feliz most often being #1 and Tanner Scheppers being number #4 and all four were consistently ranked as top 100 or top 50 prospects.

- Neftalí Feliz
- Justin Smoak
- Martín Pérez
- Tanner Scheppers

Jamey Newberg and Baseball America had Smoak ahead of Perez. Baseball Time in Arlington listed Perez ahead of Smoak.

Keith Law, who ranked the Rangers as having the number 1 farm system listed them in his top 100 with Perez being the highest of the four coming in at #7 overall in baseball.

MLB.com's top 50 players also included the Rangers prospects. Feliz and Smoak were both in the top 10 on this list.

MLB Fanhouse ranked the Rangers system number 2 and listed them in their top 100 as well.

Baseball America had the Rangers farm system ranked the second-best, behind Tampa Bay. Two of their main writers, John Manuel and Jim Callis, have stated they consider the Rangers to be the number 1 farm system as recently as December, 2009.

The Rangers minor league affiliates set a club record by sending six of the minor league teams to their respective playoffs.

=== MLB draft and international free agents ===
On January 18 it was reported the Rangers signed Jorge Alfaro, a 16-year-old catcher from Colombia, for $1.3 million. The 6' 1" 185 lb (84 kg) right-hander is a power hitter with a strong arm. The Rangers also signed Australian-born catcher Guy Edmonds for $150,000 in February.

The Rangers signed Dominican Republic short stop Luis Marte for 215,000 in November.

Draft: The Rangers accumulated 4 first round and supplemental round picks for the 2010 draft; the pick at 15, awarded for their failure to sign Matt Purke from the 2009 pick, their natural pick at 22, and picks 45 and 49 from the loss of free agents Iván Rodríguez and Marlon Byrd respectively. This was the most 1st round picks the Rangers had acquired since 2007 when the Rangers had 5 1st round picks.

Speculation prior to the draft predicted the Rangers would acquire a 'safe' pick at 15 because if they failed to sign the pick the Rangers would receive no further compensation for the pick. It was also speculated the Rangers would select players expected to be signed close to slot due to financial difficulties with the bankruptcy process and being required to follow the budget the team had set out prior to the season and approved by MLB.

Round	Pick	Name	Position	Link
1	15	Jake Skole	OF	Draft Preview
1	22	Kellin Deglan	Catcher	Draft Preview
1A	45	Luke Jackson	Right-handed Pitcher	Draft Preview
1A	49	Mike Olt	Third Base	Draft Preview
2	72	Cody Buckel	Right-handed Pitcher	
3	103	Jordan Atkins	Outfielder	
4	136	Drew Robinson	SS/OF	
5	166	Justin Grimm	Right-handed Pitcher	

Jake Skole did not make the top 200 prospects in Baseball America's draft preview and an ankle injury at the start of his senior year of high school kept him out of action until the playoffs. However his performance in the playoffs helped increase his draft position getting two hits off Kaleb Cowart who was selected by the division rival Angels with the 18th pick. Some reviews see the pick as a stretch while others see the pick as a good selection of raw talent and believe Skole would have been picked a few selections later in the 1st round.

=== Roster ===
2010 Texas Rangers
Roster
Pitchers: 68 Omar Beltré; 39 Scott Feldman; 30 Neftalí Feliz; 50 Frank Francisco; 40 Rich Harden; 54 Matt Harrison; 45 Derek Holland; 35 Tommy Hunter; 62 Michael Kirkman; 33 Cliff Lee; 48 Colby Lewis; 49 Mark Lowe; 52 Doug Mathis; 58 Guillermo Moscoso; 57 Dustin Nippert; 56 Darren O'Day; 64 Alexi Ogando; 28 Darren Oliver; 59 Clay Rapada; 49 Chris Ray; 46 Pedro Strop; 36 C. J. Wilson	Catchers: 11 Bengie Molina; 51 Max Ramírez; 21 Jarrod Saltalamacchia; 2 Taylor Teagarden; 15,20 Matt Treanor; Infielders: 1 Elvis Andrus; 14 Joaquín Árias; 3 Andrés Blanco; 8 Jorge Cantú; 12 Alex Cora; 19 Chris Davis; 25 Ryan Garko; 6 Esteban Germán; 12,15 Cristian Guzmán; 5 Ian Kinsler; 18 Mitch Moreland; 12 Justin Smoak; 10 Mike Young; Outfielders: 41 Brandon Boggs; 29 Julio Borbon; 17 Nelson Cruz; 21 Jeff Francoeur; 23 Craig Gentry; 27 Vladimir Guerrero; 32 Josh Hamilton; 7 David Murphy	Manager: 38 Ron Washington; Coaches: 16 Dave Anderson (third base); 43 Andy Hawkins (bullpen); 13 Clint Hurdle (hitting); 31 Mike Maddux (pitching); 4 Jackie Moore (bench); 53 Johnny Narron (coach); 24 Gary Pettis (first base)

=== Season standings ===
==== American League West ====
AL West
Team	W	L	Pct.	GB	Home	Road
Texas Rangers	90	72	.556	—	51‍–‍30	39‍–‍42
Oakland Athletics	81	81	.500	9	47‍–‍34	34‍–‍47
Los Angeles Angels	80	82	.494	10	43‍–‍38	37‍–‍44
Seattle Mariners	61	101	.377	29	35‍–‍46	26‍–‍55

==== American League Wild Card ====
Division winners
Team	W	L	Pct.
Tampa Bay Rays	96	66	.593
Minnesota Twins	94	68	.580
Texas Rangers	90	72	.556

Wild Card team (Top team qualifies for postseason)
Team	W	L	Pct.	GB
New York Yankees	95	67	.586	—
Boston Red Sox	89	73	.549	6
Chicago White Sox	88	74	.543	7
Toronto Blue Jays	85	77	.525	10
Detroit Tigers	81	81	.500	14
Oakland Athletics	81	81	.500	14
Los Angeles Angels	80	82	.494	15
Cleveland Indians	69	93	.426	26
Kansas City Royals	67	95	.414	28
Baltimore Orioles	66	96	.407	29
Seattle Mariners	61	101	.377	34

==== Record vs. opponents ====
2010 American League record Source: MLB Standings Grid – 2010
Team	BAL	BOS	CWS	CLE	DET	KC	LAA	MIN	NYY	OAK	SEA	TB	TEX	TOR	NL
Baltimore	–	9–9	4–3	3–3	5–5	2–4	6–0	3–5	5–13	3–7	3–6	7–11	6–4	3–15	7–11
Boston	9–9	–	1–6	4–4	3–3	4–3	9–1	3–2	9–9	4–5	7–3	7–11	4–6	12–6	13–5
Chicago	3–4	6–1	–	9–9	8–10	10–8	7–2	5–13	2–4	4–5	9–1	3–4	4–5	3–5	15–3
Cleveland	3–3	4–4	9–9	–	9–9	10–8	5–4	6–12	2–6	3–6	3–4	2–7	2–4	6–4	5–13
Detroit	5–5	3–3	10–8	9–9	–	10–8	6–4	9–9	4–4	3–3	3–5	1–6	3–6	4–4	11–7
Kansas City	4–2	3-4	9–10	8–10	8–10	–	3-7	5–13	3–5	3–6	5–4	4–4	2–7	3–3	8–10
Los Angeles	0–6	1–9	2–7	4–5	4–6	7–3	–	2–5	4–4	11–8	15–4	4–5	9–10	6–3	11–7
Minnesota	5–3	2–3	13–5	12–6	9–9	13–5	5–2	–	2–4	6–3	6-4	3–5	7–3	3–6	8–10
New York	13–5	9–9	4–2	6-2	4–4	5–3	4–4	4–2	–	9–1	6–4	8–10	4–4	8–10	11–7
Oakland	7–3	5–4	5–4	6–3	3–3	6–3	8–11	3–6	1–9	–	13–6	4–5	9–10	3–4	8–10
Seattle	6–3	3–7	1–9	4–3	5–3	4–5	4–15	4–6	4–6	6–13	–	2–7	7–12	2–3	9–9
Tampa Bay	11–7	11–7	4–3	7–2	6–1	4–4	5–4	5–3	10–8	5–4	7–2	–	4–2	10–8	7–11
Texas	4–6	6–4	5–4	4–2	6–3	7–2	10-9	3-7	4-4	10-9	12–7	2–4	–	3–7	14–4
Toronto	15–3	6–12	5–3	4–6	4–4	3–3	3–6	6–3	10–8	4–3	3–2	8–10	7–3	–	7–11

- Source: MLB Standings Grid – 2010

=== Record vs. opponents ===
2010 American League record Source: MLB Standings Grid – 2010
Team	BAL	BOS	CWS	CLE	DET	KC	LAA	MIN	NYY	OAK	SEA	TB	TEX	TOR	NL
Baltimore	–	9–9	4–3	3–3	5–5	2–4	6–0	3–5	5–13	3–7	3–6	7–11	6–4	3–15	7–11
Boston	9–9	–	1–6	4–4	3–3	4–3	9–1	3–2	9–9	4–5	7–3	7–11	4–6	12–6	13–5
Chicago	3–4	6–1	–	9–9	8–10	10–8	7–2	5–13	2–4	4–5	9–1	3–4	4–5	3–5	15–3
Cleveland	3–3	4–4	9–9	–	9–9	10–8	5–4	6–12	2–6	3–6	3–4	2–7	2–4	6–4	5–13
Detroit	5–5	3–3	10–8	9–9	–	10–8	6–4	9–9	4–4	3–3	3–5	1–6	3–6	4–4	11–7
Kansas City	4–2	3-4	9–10	8–10	8–10	–	3-7	5–13	3–5	3–6	5–4	4–4	2–7	3–3	8–10
Los Angeles	0–6	1–9	2–7	4–5	4–6	7–3	–	2–5	4–4	11–8	15–4	4–5	9–10	6–3	11–7
Minnesota	5–3	2–3	13–5	12–6	9–9	13–5	5–2	–	2–4	6–3	6-4	3–5	7–3	3–6	8–10
New York	13–5	9–9	4–2	6-2	4–4	5–3	4–4	4–2	–	9–1	6–4	8–10	4–4	8–10	11–7
Oakland	7–3	5–4	5–4	6–3	3–3	6–3	8–11	3–6	1–9	–	13–6	4–5	9–10	3–4	8–10
Seattle	6–3	3–7	1–9	4–3	5–3	4–5	4–15	4–6	4–6	6–13	–	2–7	7–12	2–3	9–9
Tampa Bay	11–7	11–7	4–3	7–2	6–1	4–4	5–4	5–3	10–8	5–4	7–2	–	4–2	10–8	7–11
Texas	4–6	6–4	5–4	4–2	6–3	7–2	10-9	3-7	4-4	10-9	12–7	2–4	–	3–7	14–4
Toronto	15–3	6–12	5–3	4–6	4–4	3–3	3–6	6–3	10–8	4–3	3–2	8–10	7–3	–	7–11

- Source: MLB Standings Grid – 2010

=== Game log ===
2010 Texas Rangers Schedule

== Farm system ==
Level	Team	League	Manager
AAA	Oklahoma City RedHawks	Pacific Coast League	Bobby Jones
AA	Frisco RoughRiders	Texas League	Steve Buechele
A	Bakersfield Blaze	California League	Bill Haselman
A	Hickory Crawdads	South Atlantic League	Bill Richardson
A-Short Season	Spokane Indians	Northwest League	Tim Hulett
Rookie	AZL Rangers	Arizona League	Jayce Tingler
