= Michael Kirkman =

American baseball player (born 1986)

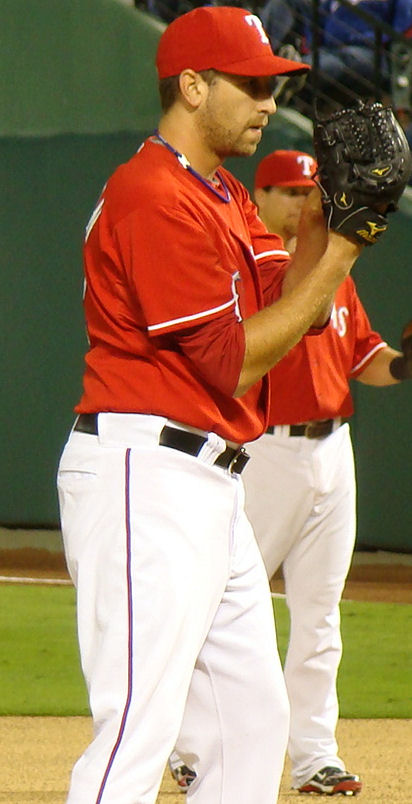
- Kirkman with the Texas Rangers
- Pitcher
- Born: September 18, 1986 (age 40); Lake City, Florida, U.S.
- Batted: Left Threw: Left

MLB debut
- August 21, 2010, for the Texas Rangers

Last MLB appearance
- May 9, 2016, for the Milwaukee Brewers

MLB statistics
- Win–loss record: 2–6
- Earned run average: 5.28
- Strikeouts: 104
- Stats at Baseball Reference

Teams
- Texas Rangers (2010–2014); San Diego Padres (2016); Milwaukee Brewers (2016)

Michael Scott Kirkman (born September 18, 1986) is an American former professional baseball pitcher. He played in Major League Baseball (MLB) for the Texas Rangers, San Diego Padres, and Milwaukee Brewers.

== Early life ==
Prior to playing professionally, he attended Columbia High School in Lake City, Florida.

== Professional career ==
=== Texas Rangers ===
Kirkman was drafted by the Texas Rangers in the fifth round, with the 159th overall selection, of the 2005 Major League Baseball draft, and signed.

With the rookie-level Arizona League Rangers in 2005, Kirkman went 3–1 with a 3.44 ERA in 14 games (nine starts), striking out 58 batters in 52 1/3 innings. He split 2006 between the AZL Rangers (eight games) and Clinton LumberKings (six games), going a combined 1–5 with a 9.70 ERA in 14 games (10 starts). He walked 51 batters in 34 1/3 innings while striking out 30. Despite posting an ERA near ten, he did not allow a single home run in 2006.

Kirkman pitched for the LumberKings (five games) and Spokane Indians (nine games) in 2007, going a combined 1–5 with a 7.14 ERA in 14 games (eight starts). He pitched for Spokane and Clinton again in 2008, improving to a combined record of 5–4 with an ERA of 3.84 in 17 games (16 starts).

2009 became a breakout year for Kirkman. In eight Bakersfield Blaze games Kirkman threw 48 innings with a 2.06 ERA, striking out 54 and issued 18 walks. Kirkman was promoted to the Double-A Frisco RoughRiders, threw 96 innings in 18 games and earned a spot on the 40_man roster after the 2009 season. In an interview with Jason Cole, Kirkman attributed his 2009 improvement to watching film of Cliff Lee.

I started watching Cliff Lee pitch, and I started watching video of him and video of me. I was comparing myself to him. One thing he did is he shortened up his front arm and it let him get through the ball rather than having to go around himself to get to the plate. That really, I think, is what turned me on.

— Michael Kirkman

Kirkman began 2010 with the Oklahoma City RedHawks and was ranked as the 15th best prospect at the start of the year by Jamey Newberg. In his major league debut with the Rangers on August 21, he struck out the first three batters he faced and retired all four. In 14 appearances for Texas during his rookie campaign, Kirkman recorded a 1.65 ERA with 16 strikeouts across 16 1/3 innings pitched.

After beginning the 2011 season with the Rangers, Kirkman was optioned to the Triple-A Round Rock Express on April 20, 2011. In 15 total games for Texas, he struggled to a 6.59 ERA with 21 strikeouts across 27 1/3 innings pitched.

On May 21, 2012, the Rangers announced that Kirkman was being treated for skin cancer. He still managed to pitch in 38 contests for the Rangers, compiling a 1–2 record and 3.82 ERA with 38 strikeouts across 35 1/3 innings pitched. Kirkman started the 2013 season with the Rangers until June 9 when he was placed on the 15-day disabled list, due to a reoccurrence of the skin cancer. In 25 appearances out of the bullpen for Texas, he struggled to an 0–2 record and 8.18 ERA with 25 strikeouts and 1 save over 22 innings of work.

Kirkman was designated for assignment on March 28, 2014, following the promotion of Daniel McCutchen. He cleared waivers and was sent outright to Triple-A Round Rock on April 1. On September 2, the Rangers selected Kirkman's contract, adding him back to their active roster. In 12 appearances for Texas, he compiled a 1.59 ERA with 3 strikeouts across 5 2/3 innings pitched. Kirkman was non-tendered by the Rangers on December 2, and became a free agent.

On December 4, 2014, Kirkman re-signed with the Rangers organization on a minor league contract. Kirkman was released prior to the start of the season on March 17, 2015.

=== Milwaukee Brewers ===
On April 22, 2015, Kirkman signed a minor league contract with the Milwaukee Brewers. In 33 appearances for the Triple-A Colorado Springs Sky Sox, he compiled a 3–1 record and 2.81 ERA with 34 strikeouts over 32 innings of work. Kirkman was released by the Brewers organization on August 1.

=== San Diego Padres ===
On February 23, 2016, Kirkman signed a minor league contract with the San Diego Padres organization. He was assigned to the Triple-A El Paso Chihuahuas to begin the year. On April 26, the Padres selected Kirkman's contract, adding him to their active roster. He made 1 appearance for the Padres, allowing 4 runs on 6 hits in 1 1/3 innings pitched against the San Francisco Giants. Kirkman was designated for assignment by San Diego on May 2.

=== Milwaukee Brewers (second stint) ===
On May 5, 2016, Kirkman was claimed off waivers by the Milwaukee Brewers. He made one appearance for the Brewers, allowing one run on one hit with one strikeout in one inning pitched against the Miami Marlins. Kirkman was designated for assignment on May 13, to make room for waiver claim Jhan Mariñez. He cleared waivers and was sent outright to the Triple-A Colorado Springs Sky Sox on May 17. Kirkman elected free agency on October 3.

=== Atlanta Braves ===
The Atlanta Braves signed Kirkman to a minor league contract on January 31, 2017. However, he was released prior to the start of the regular season on March 29.
