= Ryan Garko =

American baseball player (born 1981)

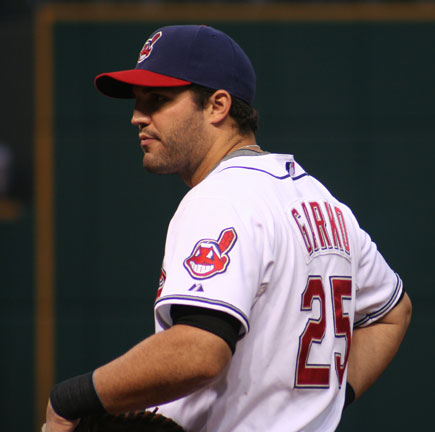
- Garko with the Cleveland Indians
- First baseman
- Born: January 2, 1981 (age 45); Pittsburgh, Pennsylvania, U.S.
- Batted: Right Threw: Right

Professional debut
- MLB: September 18, 2005, for the Cleveland Indians
- KBO: April 2, 2011, for the Samsung Lions

Last appearance
- MLB: May 13, 2010, for the Texas Rangers
- KBO: June 12, 2011, for the Samsung Lions

MLB statistics
- Batting average: .275
- Home runs: 55
- Runs batted in: 250

KBO statistics
- Batting average: .243
- Home runs: 1
- Runs batted in: 28
- Stats at Baseball Reference

Teams
- Cleveland Indians (2005–2009); San Francisco Giants (2009); Texas Rangers (2010); Samsung Lions (2011)
Medals
Men's baseball
Representing United States
World Junior Baseball Championship
Gold medal – first place	1999 Kaohsiung	Team

Ryan Francis Garko (born January 2, 1981) is an American former professional baseball outfielder, first baseman, and designated hitter. In college, he was a catcher. He played in Major League Baseball (MLB) for the Cleveland Indians, San Francisco Giants, and Texas Rangers, as well as in the KBO League for the Samsung Lions. Garko was seen by former ESPN reporter John Sickels as a good hitter who hit to all parts of the field, but with poor defensive instincts. He had a .275 batting average, 427 hits, 55 home runs, and 250 RBI in 463 career games.

When he attended Stanford University, Garko won the Johnny Bench Award and was named the Pac-10 Co-Player of the Year his senior year. He was also voted onto the College World Series Legends Team, featuring 28 of the best College World Series players as voted upon by fans, writers, and head coaches. During his time in the Cleveland Indians' organization, Garko was converted into a first baseman. In 2006, Baseball America ranked him as the fifth-best prospect in the Indians organization, including being the best at hitting for average.

Garko debuted in 2006 for the Indians, eventually taking over their first base position. In 2007, he hit a career-high 21 home runs in the regular season and batted over .300 for the Indians in the playoffs. Questions about Garko's ability to hit caused him to lose some playing time in 2008, although he managed to have 90 RBI. In 2009, Garko was traded to the San Francisco Giants to become their first baseman, but he slumped and ended the season as a backup. He signed with the Seattle Mariners in 2010 but was claimed off waivers at the end of spring training by the Texas Rangers. After just 15 games, he was sent to the minors, where he spent the rest of the year. Garko played for the Samsung Lions of the Korea Baseball Organization in 2011 and played in the minor leagues in the United States in 2012. He later attended spring training with the Colorado Rockies in 2013.

Garko was hired as an assistant coach at Stanford prior to the 2014 college baseball season. He spent the 2016 and 2017 seasons as manager of the Tulsa Drillers, a minor league affiliate of the Los Angeles Dodgers, before being named the head baseball coach at University of the Pacific on July 23, 2017. Garko currently serves as the assistant general manager of the Detroit Tigers.

== Amateur career ==
=== Early life ===
Garko was born in Pittsburgh, Pennsylvania. At the age of three, his family moved to southern California. He attended Saint Angela Merici Parish School in Brea, California, where his mother was a teacher, and attended high school at Servite High School. He graduated from Servite in 1999 alongside future major league players Ben Francisco and Brian Wolfe. Also in 1999, Garko played for the USA Baseball Junior National Team. He holds numerous records at Servite High School, including the single-season records in, triples (6), home runs (8), RBIs (52), and the career records in, games played (101), at-bats (314), hits (149), triples (19), home runs (24), RBIs (121), and walks (80). He was also the starting quarterback on the football team for two years. In the classroom, Garko had a 4.2 GPA.

=== College ===
Garko attended Stanford University on a scholarship from 1999 to 2003. He led the Stanford Cardinal baseball team in batting average in his sophomore season (2001) with a .398 clip, and was named their Most Improved Player. He helped Stanford reach the College World Series and hit .583 in the CWS. That summer, Garko played with the Hyannis Mets in the Cape Cod League, an amateur summer league. In 37 games, he batted .233 with 14 runs, 28 hits, three home runs, and 19 RBI while being named a league all-star. Next season, in his junior year, Garko was named a Johnny Bench Award semifinalist. During his senior year in 2003, he won the award and was named a First Team All-American. He also shared the Pac-10 Conference Baseball of the Year Award with Dustin Pedroia, and was named the NCAA Regional Most Outstanding Player and Stanford's Most Valuable Player. In his time at Stanford, Garko batted .350 with 60 doubles, 39 home runs, 191 RBI in 218 games played. As of 2013, he ranked fifth all-time in doubles at Stanford, seventh in RBI, and ninth in batting average and home runs. His only problem at Stanford was that he had trouble with controlling his weight. On May 6, 2010, Garko was voted on to a 28-member College World Series Legends Team as a part of a commemoration of the final College World Series in Johnny Rosenblatt Stadium. The team was voted upon by college baseball fans, college baseball writers, and Division I head coaches.

== Professional career ==
=== Cleveland Indians ===
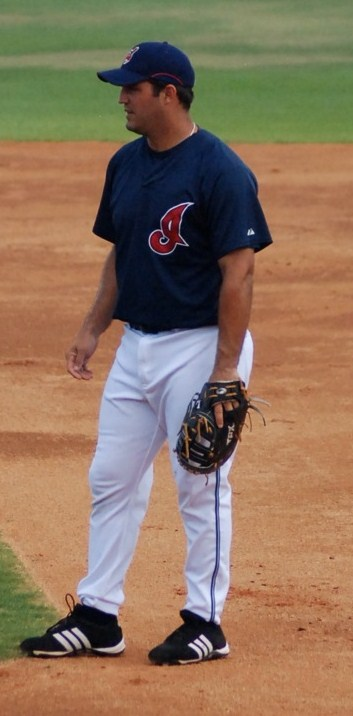
Ryan Garko during his tenure with the Cleveland Indians in 2007.

==== 2003–2004 ====
Garko was selected as a catcher by the Cleveland Indians in the third round (78th overall) of the 2003 Major League Baseball draft. On July 8, 2003, he signed a contract with the Indians and was assigned to the Single-A Mahoning Valley Scrappers of the New York–Penn League. In his first professional season, Garko batted .273 with four home runs and 16 RBI in 45 games. The next season, 2004, he split time between the Class-A Advanced Kinston Indians, the Double-A Akron Aeros, and the Triple-A Buffalo Bisons. During April, he was named the "Player of the Month" in the Carolina League. He was also named the 13th best prospect in the Carolina League by Baseball America. He batted a combined .330 with 33 doubles, 22 home runs, and 99 RBI in 113 games with all three leagues. Garko was third in the Carolina League in batting average with a .328 clip, and sixth in home runs with 16. At the end of the season, he was named the Cleveland Indians' minor league player of the year by USA Today. Garko participated in the Arizona Fall League (AFL) at the end of the 2004 season. With the Peoria Javelinas in the AFL, he batted .348 with 40 hits, five home runs, and 30 RBI in 30 games. He was named to the AFL Raising Stars team, an all-star team voted upon by managers and coaches.

==== 2005 season ====
In 2005, Garko spent spring training with the Indians, but he was returned to the minor leagues before the regular season. He spent most of the season with Triple-A Buffalo, batting .303 with 19 home runs, and 77 RBI in 127 games with the Bisons. Halfway through the 2005 season, Garko was selected to the International League all-star team. He was also selected to the All-Star Futures Game in Detroit. On September 18, 2005, Garko made his major league debut against the Kansas City Royals, pinch-hitting for Travis Hafner in the eighth inning and striking out against Chris Demaria. That was his only major league appearance of the year. For the second straight season, Garko played in the Arizona Fall League at the end of the season, this time with the Mesa Solar Sox. He batted .314 with 27 hits, five home runs, and 27 RBI in 23 games.

==== 2006 season ====
Entering the 2006 season, Baseball America ranked Garko as the fifth best prospect in the Indians' organization and the best at hitting for average. Garko attended spring training with the Indians in 2006, and was once again sent to Triple-A Buffalo to start the season. He injured his left wrist on April 21, but was not placed on the disabled list after x-rays turned up negative. Garko hit .247 with 15 home runs and 59 RBI in 127 games at the Triple-A level. Garko was tied for second in bases on balls (45), and was tied for third in home runs and RBI on the Bisons' roster at the end of the season. He was called up by the Indians on June 30, after Cleveland traded first baseman Eduardo Pérez to the Seattle Mariners. His first major league hit, a double, came on July 1, against the Cincinnati Reds. He hit his first home run a little over a month later, on August 10, against the Los Angeles Angels of Anaheim. Although Garko favored his traditional position of catcher, the Indians moved him to first base so he would have a better chance of competing for a major league roster spot. By September, he was the starting everyday first baseman for the Indians after Ben Broussard was traded to Seattle. Garko finished the season with a .292 batting average, 12 doubles, seven home runs, and 45 RBI in 50 games at the major league level.

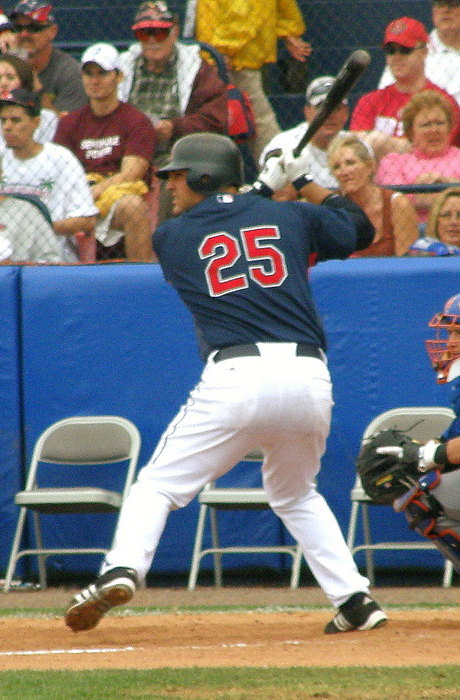
Garko with the Indians in 2008

==== 2007 season ====
Going into 2007, Anthony Castrovince of MLB.com reported that Garko would have to improve on the defensive end to make the 25-man roster because the Indians already had a first baseman in Casey Blake. Towards the end of spring training, Indians' manager Eric Wedge noted that Garko had made improvements on defense. He made the 2007 roster out of spring training for the first time in his career. On April 22, Garko hit a game-winning three-run home run in the top of the ninth inning against the Tampa Bay Rays. He became the everyday starting first baseman early in the season after Casey Blake moved to third base because of an injury to Andy Marte. He began to dislike interleague play because during it, designated hitter Travis Hafner was moved to first base, which forced Garko to the bench. On July 18, Garko hit a two-run home run in the ninth inning against Chicago White Sox' pitcher Bobby Jenks to tie the score at 5–5, and then drove in an RBI run for the win in the eleventh inning. During the regular season, Garko batted .289 with 29 doubles, one triple, 21 home runs and 61 RBI in 138 games. He was third in the league with 20 hit by pitches (an Indians single-season record). In the postseason, he hit .314 with two doubles, one home run, and 5 RBI in nine games. The Indians defeated the New York Yankees in four games in the American League Division Series before losing the American League Championship Series in seven games to the Boston Red Sox.

==== 2008 season ====
Going into the 2008 season, there were questions surrounding Garko's ability to improve as a hitter. During the early part of the season, Michael Aubrey was playing more than Garko because Garko was having trouble hitting right-handed pitching. Garko was moved down the batting order because of his struggles. In August, Garko stated that he was watching videotape in an attempt to pick up his hitting. On August 6, he was benched for three games by manager Eric Wedge for failing to run on a ground ball he hit. On September 27, Garko hit two home runs, including a grand slam against the Chicago White Sox. At the end of the season, Garko hit .273 with 21 doubles, one triple, 14 home runs and 90 RBI in 141 games. His 90 RBI tied Grady Sizemore for the team lead.

==== 2009 season ====
Before spring training in 2009, there was speculation that if Garko did not perform well, he might lose his starting first base job. Garko began practicing the outfield position for the upcoming season. Eric Wedge stated that Garko would in fact be playing the outfield in spring training. On June 21, Garko was held out of the game because of a sprained left wrist. In 78 games with Cleveland in 2009, he hit .285 with 11 home runs and 39 RBI.

=== San Francisco Giants ===
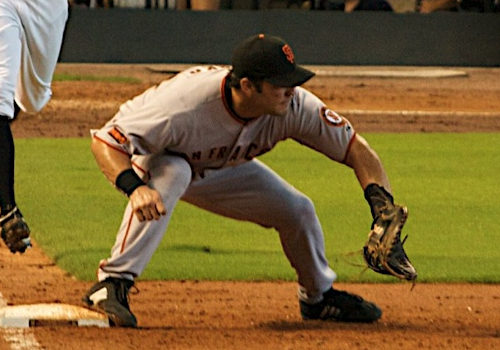
In 2009 Garko was traded by the Cleveland Indians to the San Francisco Giants.

On July 27, 2009, Garko was traded to the San Francisco Giants for left-handed pitcher Scott Barnes. He hit a game-winning double on August 18, against the Cincinnati Reds in the top of the tenth inning. He was acquired to be a full-time first baseman; however, during his tenure in San Francisco, he was third on the depth chart (behind Pablo Sandoval and Travis Ishikawa) after he got off to a sluggish start. With the Giants, Garko batted .235 with three doubles, a triple, two home runs and 12 RBI and nine walks in 40 games. Combined with his time in the Indians and Giants organization, Garko batted .268 with 13 doubles, 13 home runs and 51 RBI in 118 games. On December 12, 2009, Garko was non-tendered by the Giants, making him a free agent.

=== Seattle Mariners ===
Garko signed a one-year, $550,000 contract with the Seattle Mariners on February 1, 2010. Garko said that the reason he was signed by Seattle was because he has success against left-handed pitching. He added about signing with the Mariners:

Going through the process and studying what teams were doing, and what Jack [Zduriencik] is doing in Seattle, I realized how much I wanted to be there.

— Ryan Garko, MLB.com, February 1, 2010.

However, Garko batted only .220 with a home run and 4 RBI in 15 spring training games. On March 30, he was placed on waivers by the Mariners to make room for Mike Sweeney of the 25-man roster. Geoff Baker, reporter for The Seattle Times, stated that the reason for Garko being placed on waivers was because of Sweeney's clubhouse presence and the fact that the Mariners had stated that, due to his defensive abilities, Casey Kotchman, whom Garko was expected to split playing time with, was going to play the majority of the games at first base leaving the back-up designated hitter spot for Garko. The final decision, Baker stated, was that the Mariners had their organization full with back-up first basemen and designated hitters like Sweeney and Tommy Everidge.

=== Texas Rangers ===
On April 1, Garko was claimed by the Texas Rangers. As a result of his signing, the Rangers optioned Max Ramírez to the Triple-A Oklahoma City RedHawks to make room for Garko on the 25-man roster. The Rangers had shown interest in Garko at the trade deadline in 2009, however, no transaction ever formed and he was sent to the San Francisco Giants. On May 13, The Dallas Morning News reporter Evan Grant reported that the Rangers intended to option Garko to the minor leagues and later place him on outright waivers when outfielder Nelson Cruz was activated from the disabled list, although no transaction was official at the time of the report. Later that day, the Rangers officially optioned Garko to Triple-A Oklahoma City and placed him on waivers after Cruz was activated from the disabled list. On May 13, he cleared waivers and was outrighted to Triple-A Oklahoma City, which removed him from the Rangers' 40-man roster. Garko hit his first home run of the season, a grand slam, with the RedHawks against the Triple-A Portland Beavers on May 21. With Oklahoma City in 2010, Garko batted only .235 with 12 home runs and 48 RBI in 93 games. He became a free agent at the end of the season.

=== Samsung Lions ===
On December 10, 2010, Garko signed a one-year deal with the Samsung Lions of the Korea Baseball Organization. Due to injury, he was released on July 12. Garko batted .243 with a home run and 28 RBI in 58 games with the Lions.

=== Later career ===
Garko signed with the Long Island Ducks of the independent Atlantic League of Professional Baseball in 2012. He led the league in OPS and placing among the league leaders in batting average before getting signed to a minor league contract by the Tampa Bay Rays on May 14. Garko spent the rest of the season playing for the Double-A Montgomery Biscuits of the Southern League, batting .297 with 68 hits, eight home runs, and 40 RBI in 61 games. On November 3, he became a free agent.

On January 30, 2013, Garko signed a minor league contract with the Colorado Rockies. He was released before the season on March 23.

== Coaching career ==
After his playing career ended, Garko joined the coaching staff at Stanford University, a position he held through the 2014 season.

Garko was named as the manager of the Double-A Tulsa Drillers of the Texas League, a Los Angeles Dodgers affiliate for the 2016 season. On July 23, 2017, Garko resigned from the Drillers to take on a new job as head baseball coach at University of the Pacific. On January 8, 2020, Garko stepped down as the head coach at Pacific to join the Los Angeles Angels coaching staff. Garko spent two seasons with the Angels, working as a coaching assistant and instant replay coordinator.

== Front office career ==
On September 23, 2021, it was announced that the Detroit Tigers had hired Garko as their new Vice President of Player Development, replacing Dave Littlefield. On May 24, 2024, Garko was promoted to the position of assistant general manager.

== Head coaching record ==
Record table
Season	Team	Overall	Conference	Standing	Postseason
Pacific Tigers (West Coast Conference) (2018–2019)
2018	Pacific	22–29	11–16	9th	
2019	Pacific	23–26	10–16	8th	
Pacific:		45–55	21–32		
Total:		45–55			
National champion Postseason invitational champion Conference regular season champion Conference regular season and conference tournament champion Division regular season champion Division regular season and conference tournament champion Conference tournament champion

== Personal ==
Garko resides in Scottsdale, Arizona, with his spouse Christie, whom he met in 2004. They were on their honeymoon when Garko found out that the Giants had made him a free agent after the 2009 season. He is a fan of the Los Angeles Lakers and the Notre Dame Fighting Irish.

Awards and achievements
Preceded by Grady Sizemore	Indians' Minor League Player of the Year (the Lou Boudreau Award); 2004	Succeeded by Ryan Mulhern
