= John Manuel (writer) =

American baseball scout

John C. Manuel is a baseball scout. He works for the Cleveland Guardians after spending eight seasons as a pro scout with the Minnesota Twins..

== Career ==
Prior to being a scout, Manuel was editor-in-chief of the Durham, N.C.,-based magazine Baseball America and its website BaseballAmerica.com. He also contributed to Baseball America books such as the Prospect Handbook and Almanac and co-hosted Baseball America podcasts. Manuel is an expert on college baseball, minor league prospects and the draft, leading to radio and television appearances on ESPN and MLB Network, and as a color analyst for USA Baseball, ESPN and the Durham Bulls.

Prior to joining Baseball America, Manuel worked at the Hickory Daily Record, the Greensboro News and Observer and the High Point Enterprise. He is a graduate of the University of North Carolina at Chapel Hill, where he worked at the Daily Tar Heel.

== Personal life ==
He is a first generation Greek-American, and the son of Rev. Chrysostom Manuel. His uncle is the Rev. Demetrios Constantelos.
