= Omar Beltré =

Dominican baseball player (born 1981)

- Pitcher
- Born: August 24, 1981 (age 45); Santo Domingo, Dominican Republic
- Batted: Right Threw: Right

MLB debut
- June 30, 2010, for the Texas Rangers

Last MLB appearance
- July 5, 2010, for the Texas Rangers

MLB statistics
- Win–loss record: 0–1
- Earned run average: 9.00
- Strikeouts: 9
- Stats at Baseball Reference

Teams
- Texas Rangers (2010)

Omar Beltré (Born August 24, 1981) is a Dominican former professional baseball pitcher. He played in Major League Baseball (MLB) for the Texas Rangers.

== Professional career ==
=== Minor leagues ===
Beltre signed with the Texas Rangers on March 1, 2000. He received a $600,000 bonus, the largest the Rangers have ever given an international player. He was assigned to the Gulf Coast League Rangers, and went 5–4 with a 3.54 earned run average and 44 strikeouts in his first professional season. He improved to 6–3 with a 3.38 ERA and 83 strikeouts for the Appalachian League's Pulaski Rangers in 2001, leading his team in both wins and strikeouts.

After sitting out the entire 2002 season with an injury, he returned to go 3–3 with a 2.39 ERA for the Midwest League's Clinton LumberKings in 2003. Having been used primarily as a starter up to that point, Beltre only made five starts in 2003 and eleven appearances out of the bullpen.

==== Human trafficking ring ====
After going 5–5 with a 2.45 ERA and 47 strikeouts in 46 games (all in relief) with the Stockton Ports in 2004, Beltre earned his first invitation to spring training When he went to the U.S. embassy in January 2005 to pick up his work visa, consulate officials were waiting. According to the Rangers' information, consulate officials soon discovered an inordinate number of young minor league ballplayers had been married in a short period to women who had previously been denied visas, raising a red flag.

Beltre immediately admitted guilt to his involvement in a human trafficking ring, and was assured that he would likely only receive a one-year exclusion, and that he would be able to reapply the following year. As it turned out, he was banned from entering the United States for five years, limiting him to winter ball, the Dominican Summer League and international tournaments.

He missed all of the 2008 season and most of 2009 with another injury.

=== Texas Rangers ===
On February 12, 2010, Beltré and pitcher Alexi Ogando, who was also involved in the human trafficking ring out of the Dominican Republic, were granted visas, and allowed to attend Spring training, arriving in the U.S. on the 16th. After spring training, he was assigned to the triple A Oklahoma City RedHawks of the Pacific Coast League, where he went 0–5 with a 2.39 ERA in fifteen games (five starts) before getting called up to the majors.

Beltré made his major league debut on June 30, 2010, starting against Scott Kazmir and the Los Angeles Angels. The first batter he faced, Erick Aybar homered. He allowed two more runs in the second and pitcher a scoreless third & fourth before being pulled with a 4-3 lead.

He made one more start against the Cleveland Indians on July 5, giving up four runs in three innings to take the loss. He was optioned to the Triple A Oklahoma City RedHawks the following day, and never made another major league appearance.

Beltré underwent surgery for spinal stenosis in February 2011. On November 2, 2011, Beltré was removed from the 40-man roster and sent outright to Oklahoma City. He became a free agent two days later, but never pitched past the 2011 season.
