= Max Ramírez =

Venezuelan baseball player (born 1984)

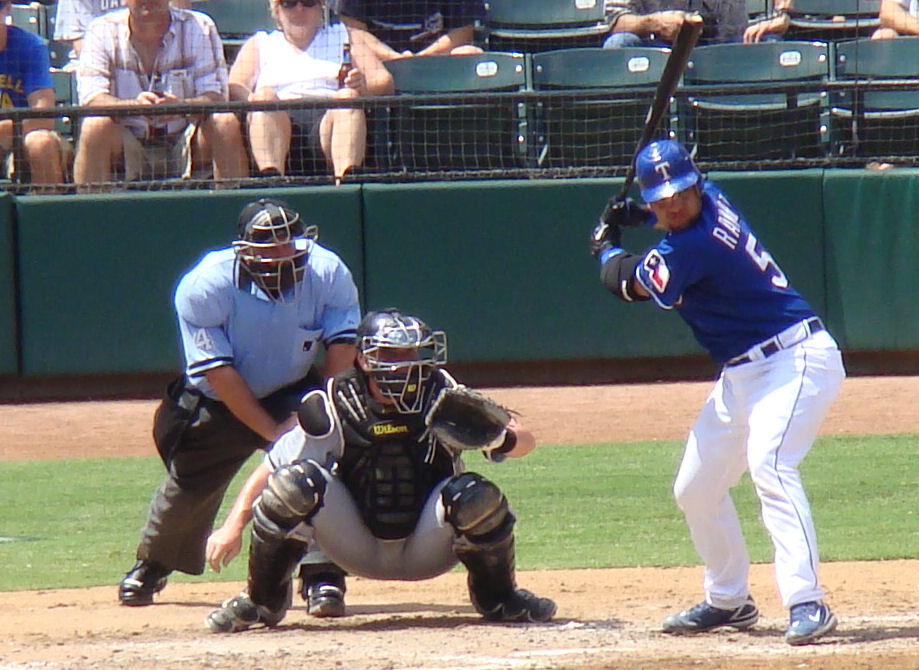
- Max Ramirez batting in a July 13, 2008 game
- Catcher / First baseman
- Born: October 11, 1984 (age 42); Barquisimeto, Venezuela
- Batted: Right Threw: Right

MLB debut
- June 22, 2008, for the Texas Rangers

Last MLB appearance
- June 30, 2010, for the Texas Rangers

MLB statistics
- Batting average: .217
- Home runs: 4
- Runs batted in: 17
- Stats at Baseball Reference

Teams
- Texas Rangers (2008, 2010)

Maximiliano R. Ramírez (born October 11, 1984) is a Venezuelan former professional baseball catcher. He played in Major League Baseball (MLB) for numerous teams.

== Career ==
=== Atlanta Braves ===
In 2002 Ramírez was signed as an international undrafted free agent by the Atlanta Braves.

=== Cleveland Indians ===
In 2006, Ramírez was traded by the Braves to the Cleveland Indians for Bob Wickman.

=== Texas Rangers ===
In 2007, he was traded by Cleveland to the Texas Rangers for Kenny Lofton. Ramírez made his Rangers debut on June 22, 2008.

After the 2008 season ended, Ramírez played in the Venezuelan Winter League for the La Guaira Sharks. In 50 games, he batted .298 with 15 home runs, 53 RBI, and 42 runs scored en route to winning the Rookie of the Year Award over fellow catcher Pablo Sandoval.

Following the 2009 season Ramírez traded to the Boston Red Sox for Mike Lowell, but the trade was canceled because of Lowell's torn thumb ligament.

Going into the 2010 MLB season Ramírez was rated as the Rangers 11th best prospect by Baseball America.

=== Chicago Cubs ===
After the Texas Rangers signed Arthur Rhodes on January 4, 2011, Ramirez was placed on waivers to clear a spot on the 40 man roster. The Boston Red Sox claimed him on January 5. He was claimed off waivers again on January 10, this time by the Chicago Cubs. Ramirez was released on May 6.

=== Houston Astros ===
Ramirez signed a minor league contract with the Houston Astros on May 10, and was optioned to Triple-A Oklahoma City RedHawks. He was released on June 16.

=== San Francisco Giants ===
On June 21, Ramirez signed a minor league contract with the San Francisco Giants.

=== Kansas City Royals ===
Ramírez signed a minor league contract with the Kansas City Royals on December 13, 2011. He posted a .300/.374/.473 batting line with 17 homers and 77 RBIs for the Triple-A Omaha Storm Chasers in 2012, but failed to earn a Major League callup.

On October 18, 2012, Ramírez re-signed with the Royals on a minor league deal for the 2013 season.

=== Cincinnati Reds ===
The Cincinnati Reds signed Ramirez to a minor league deal on November 8, 2013. On May 22, 2014, Ramirez was released by the Reds.

=== Second stint with the Royals ===
On May 27, 2014, Ramirez signed a minor league deal to return to the Royals. He was assigned to the Double-A Northwest Arkansas Naturals.

=== Broncos de Reynosa ===
On April 1, 2016, Ramirez signed with the Broncos de Reynosa of the Mexican Baseball League.

=== Toros de Tijuana ===
On May 18, 2016, Ramirez was traded to the Toros de Tijuana. He was released on June 13, 2016.

=== Sugar Land Skeeters ===
On April 19, 2017, Ramirez signed with the Sugar Land Skeeters of the Atlantic League of Professional Baseball.

=== Saraperos de Saltillo ===
On April 21, 2017, Ramirez signed with the Saraperos de Saltillo of the Mexican Baseball League. He was released on February 24, 2018.

=== Tecolotes de los Dos Laredos ===
On May 1, 2018, Ramirez signed with the Tecolotes de los Dos Laredos of the Mexican Baseball League. He was released on May 15, 2018.

== See also ==
- List of Major League Baseball players from Venezuela
