= Jamey Newberg =

American lawyer (born 1969)

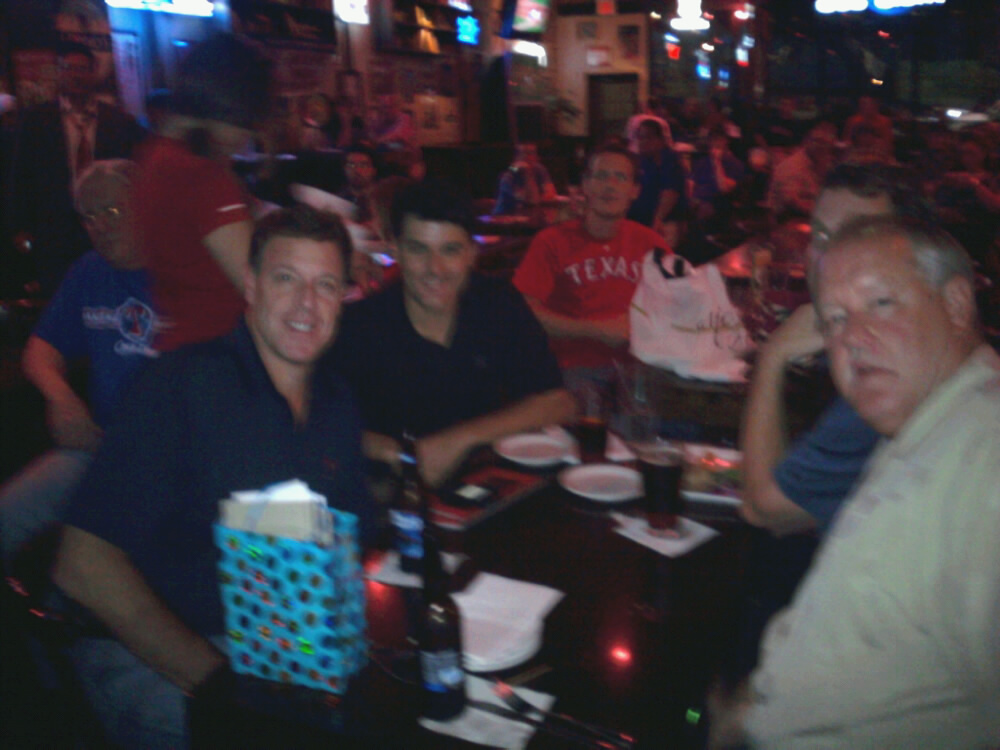
- Newberg, second to left, with then Texas Rangers owner Chuck Greenberg, front left, and stadium announcer Chuck Morgan, far right, at a Newberg watching party
- Born: Jamison Dean Newberg; March 3, 1969 (age 57); Dallas, Texas, U.S.
- Occupations: Attorney; Sports Writer
- Years active: 1998–present
- Website: www.newbergreport.com

Jamison Dean "Jamey" Newberg (born March 3, 1969) is a Dallas, Texas lawyer and sportswriter who became fairly well known in the late 1990s as an expert multimedia commentator on the Texas Rangers baseball organization, with an emphasis on the subtleties of minor league player development and complex trade strategies. Newberg originally compiled his analysis and observations (which have come to be known as The Newberg Report) into a semi-regular email memo sent to a handful of like-minded fan recipients. As his readership increased, those insights were also posted to a blog. Since 1999 his commentary has been collected and published in an annual bound volume each winter. Newberg has appeared regularly on Dallas television and radio broadcasts discussing the Rangers, has been a featured panelist on a regular Rangers-based podcast, and has also contributed written material to the Rangers official online presence on MLB.com. As of February 2018, Newberg joined subscription-based sports website The Athletic as a contributing writer covering the Texas Rangers.

== Recognition ==
In 2007, 2008, and 2009, Newberg was recognized as one of the 50 most influential people on the Dallas sports landscape. In 2011, he was named Best Sports Columnist in Dallas.

== Controversy ==
Newberg's independence and impartiality were called into question during the Rangers' 2010 bankruptcy proceedings, when the Dallas Morning News revealed that the organization had paid Newberg in excess of $27,000, in addition to paying for him and his family to attend the team's spring training in Arizona. Newberg maintained that his "obnoxious optimism" regarding the Rangers is genuine and not a condition for compensation from the organization, and said that the payments he received were for content he produced for the Rangers' website, gameday programs, and books he had written that were distributed by the team to season ticket holders. Craig Calcaterra of NBC Sports was critical of Newberg, saying that he should have previously disclosed his financial arrangement with the Rangers to his readers.
