= 2011 Minnesota Twins season =

2011 Minnesota Twins
- League: American League
- Division: Central
- Ballpark: Target Field
- City: Minneapolis, Minnesota
- Record: 63–99 (.389)
- Divisional place: 5th
- Owners: Jim Pohlad
- General managers: Bill Smith
- Managers: Ron Gardenhire
- Television: Fox Sports North (Dick Bremer, Bert Blyleven)
- Radio: 1500 AM ESPN Radio Twin Cities (KSTP-AM) (John Gordon, Dan Gladden, Jack Morris, Kris Atteberry, Ted Robinson, Bob Kurtz)
- Stats: ESPN.com; Baseball Reference

The 2011 Minnesota Twins season was the 51st season for the franchise in Minnesota, and the 111th overall in the American League. The team drew 3,168,107 fans during the year. The Twins had a poor season, falling from first place the year before to last place in the American League Central with a 63–99 record. The Twins finished in last place in the division for the first time since 2000, and this was their first losing season since 2007.

== Regular season ==
Longtime Twins pitcher and broadcaster Bert Blyleven was elected to the Hall of Fame on January 5, and inducted on July 24.

On May 3, on a 42-degree Chicago Tuesday night, Francisco Liriano hurled the Twins' fifth no-hitter, closing down the White Sox. He struck out two and walked six on 123 pitches, but won 1–0. Liriano's gem follows previous no-hitters by Jack Kralick (1962), Dean Chance (1967), Scott Erickson (1994) and Eric Milton (1999). To date, the Twins have been no-hit four times in their history.

The Twins opened their June 21 game against the San Francisco Giants and Madison Bumgarner with four singles and four doubles. The eight consecutive hits to open a game tied a major league record. After Ben Revere collected his second hit of the inning, Bumgarner was lifted.

Only Michael Cuddyer represented the Twins at the All-Star Game. As a reserve outfielder, he was inserted at first base for two innings and went 0 for 1.

Slugger Jim Thome belted career homers number 599 and 600 on August 15. He was just the eighth player in history to reach 600. Six days later at Target Field, Thome on the diamond with New York's Alex Rodriguez marked the first time since July 17, 1973 that two 600-home-run club members squared off—on that date it was Willie Mays and Hank Aaron.

A Twins first happened on September 6, when Chris Parmelee, Joe Benson and Liam Hendriks each made their major league debut in the same game. Starting pitcher Hendriks took the loss, striking out 4 but giving up four hits and all three Chicago White Sox runs. Parmelee's 2-for-4 night topped Benson's 0-for 3.

At season's end, closer Joe Nathan finished with 260 Minnesota saves, topping Rick Aguilera's club record of 254. Nathan signed as a free agent with the Texas Rangers in November.

=== Season standings ===
==== American League Central ====
AL Central
Team	W	L	Pct.	GB	Home	Road
Detroit Tigers	95	67	.586	—	50‍–‍31	45‍–‍36
Cleveland Indians	80	82	.494	15	44‍–‍37	36‍–‍45
Chicago White Sox	79	83	.488	16	36‍–‍45	43‍–‍38
Kansas City Royals	71	91	.438	24	40‍–‍41	31‍–‍50
Minnesota Twins	63	99	.389	32	33‍–‍48	30‍–‍51

==== American League Wild Card ====
Division winners
Team	W	L	Pct.
New York Yankees	97	65	.599
Texas Rangers	96	66	.593
Detroit Tigers	95	67	.586

Wild Card team (Top team qualifies for postseason)
Team	W	L	Pct.	GB
Tampa Bay Rays	91	71	.562	—
Boston Red Sox	90	72	.556	1
Los Angeles Angels of Anaheim	86	76	.531	5
Toronto Blue Jays	81	81	.500	10
Cleveland Indians	80	82	.494	11
Chicago White Sox	79	83	.488	12
Oakland Athletics	74	88	.457	17
Kansas City Royals	71	91	.438	20
Baltimore Orioles	69	93	.426	22
Seattle Mariners	67	95	.414	24
Minnesota Twins	63	99	.389	28

== Record vs opponents ==
2011 American League record Source: MLB Standings Grid – 2011
Team	BAL	BOS	CWS	CLE	DET	KC	LAA	MIN	NYY	OAK	SEA	TB	TEX	TOR	NL
Baltimore	–	8–10	4–4	2–5	5–5	5–4	3–6	6–2	5–13	4–5	4–2	9–9	1–5	6–12	7–11
Boston	10–8	–	2–4	4–6	5–1	5–3	6–2	5–2	12–6	6–2	5–4	6–12	4–6	10–8	10–8
Chicago	4–4	4–2	–	11–7	5–13	7–11	2–6	9–9	2–6	6–4	7–2	4–4	4–4	3–4	11–7
Cleveland	5–2	6–4	7–11	–	6–12	12–6	3–6	11–7	3–4	5–2	5–4	2–4	1–9	3–4	11–7
Detroit	5–5	1–5	13–5	12–6	–	11–7	3–4	14–4	4–3	5–5	4–6	6–1	6–3	4–2	7–11
Kansas City	4–5	3–5	11–7	6–12	7–11	–	7–3	8–10	3–3	4–5	5–3	2–5	2–6	4–3	5–13
Los Angeles	6–3	2–6	6–2	6–3	4–3	3–7	–	6–3	4–5	8–11	12–7	4–4	7–12	5–5	13–5
Minnesota	2–6	2–5	9–9	7–11	4–14	10–8	3–6	–	2–6	4–4	3–5	3–7	5–3	1–5	8–10
New York	13–5	6–12	6–2	4–3	3–4	3–3	5–4	6–2	–	6–3	5–4	9–9	7–2	11–7	13–5
Oakland	5–4	2–6	4–6	2–5	5–5	5–4	11–8	4–4	3–6	–	9–10	5–2	6–13	5–5	8–10
Seattle	2–4	4–5	2–7	4–5	6–4	3–5	7–12	5–3	4–5	10–9	–	4–6	4–15	3–6	9–9
Tampa Bay	9–9	12–6	4–4	4–2	1–6	5–2	4–4	7–3	9–9	2–5	6–4	–	4–5	12–6	12–6
Texas	5–1	6–4	4–4	9–1	3–6	6–2	12–7	3–5	2–7	13–6	15–4	5–4	–	4–6	9–9
Toronto	12–6	8–10	4–3	4–3	2–4	3–4	5–5	5–1	7–11	5–5	6–3	6–12	6–4	–	8–10

- Source: MLB Standings Grid – 2011

=== Roster ===
2011 Minnesota Twins
Roster
Pitchers: 30 Scott Baker; 53 Nick Blackburn; 31 Alex Burnett; 55 Matt Capps; 58 Scott Diamond; 52 Brian Duensing; 54 Phil Dumatrait; 61 Eric Hacker; 62 Liam Hendriks; 37 Jim Hoey; 56 Dusty Hughes; 44 Chuck James; 47 Francisco Liriano; 49 Jeff Manship; 50 José Mijares; 36 Joe Nathan; 17 Lester Oliveros; 48 Carl Pavano; 15 Glen Perkins; 39 Anthony Slama; 59 Kevin Slowey; 51 Anthony Swarzak; 57 Kyle Waldrop	Catchers: 41 Drew Butera; 27 Steve Holm; 7 Joe Mauer; 32 René Rivera; Infielders: 12 Alexi Casilla; 26 Brian Dinkelman; 38 Luke Hughes; 33 Justin Morneau; 1 Tsuyoshi Nishioka; 64 Chris Parmelee; 24 Trevor Plouffe; 20 Matt Tolbert; 19 Danny Valencia	Outfielders: 63 Joe Benson; 5 Michael Cuddyer; 16 Jason Kubel; 18 Jason Repko; 37,11 Ben Revere; 2 Denard Span; 23 Rene Tosoni; 21 Delmon Young; Designated hitters: 25 Jim Thome	Manager: 35 Ron Gardenhire; Coaches: 40 Rick Anderson (pitching); 75 Nate Dammann (coach); 9 Steve Liddle (bench); 43 Rick Stelmaszek (bullpen); 45 Scott Ullger (third base); 46 Joe Vavra (hitting); 13 Jerry White (first base)

== Game log ==
Legend
Twins Win	Twins Loss	Postponed

2011 Game Log
April (9–17)

#	Date	Opponent	Score	Win	Loss	Save	Attendance	Record
1	April 1	@ Blue Jays	13–3	Romero (1–0)	Pavano (0–1)		47,984	0–1
2	April 2	@ Blue Jays	6–1	Drabek (1–0)	Liriano (0–1)		27,194	0–2
3	April 3	@ Blue Jays	4–3	Blackburn (1–0)	Cecil (0–1)	Nathan (1)	35,505	1–2
4	April 4	@ Yankees	4–3	Nova (1–0)	Baker (0–1)	Rivera (3)	40,311	1–3
5	April 5	@ Yankees	5–4 (10)	Capps (1–0)	Logan (0–1)	Nathan (2)	40,267	2–3
	April 6	@ Yankees	Postponed (rain); Makeup: 9/19					
6	April 7	@ Yankees	4–3	Burnett (2–0)	Liriano (0–2)	Rivera (4)	41,512	2–4
7	April 8	Athletics	2–1	Pavano (1–1)	Anderson (0–1)	Nathan (3)	40,714	3–4
8	April 9	Athletics	1–0	Gonzalez (2–0)	Blackburn (1–1)	Fuentes (2)	39,936	3–5
9	April 10	Athletics	5–3	McCarthy (1–0)	Baker (0–2)	Fuentes (3)	38,484	3–6
10	April 12	Royals	4–3 (10)	Hughes (1–0)	Tejeda (0–1)		38,154	4–6
11	April 13	Royals	10–5	Davies (1–0)	Liriano (0–3)	Jeffress (1)	36,286	4–7
12	April 14	@ Rays	4–3 (10)	Farnsworth (1–0)	Capps (1–1)		10,042	4–8
13	April 15	@ Rays	5–2	Davis (1–2)	Blackburn (1–2)	Farnsworth (3)	15,342	4–9
14	April 16	@ Rays	4–3	Cruz (1–0)	Nathan (0–1)		16,428	4–10
15	April 17	@ Rays	4–2	Duensing (1–0)	Hellickson (1–2)	Capps (1)	22,426	5–10
16	April 18	@ Orioles	5–3	Liriano (1–3)	Tillman (0–2)	Capps (2)	13,138	6–10
17	April 19	@ Orioles	11–0	Arrieta (2–1)	Pavano (1–2)		12,045	6–11
18	April 20	@ Orioles	5–4	Britton (3–1)	Blackburn (1–3)	Gregg (2)	13,825	6–12
19	April 21	@ Orioles	3–1	Baker (1–2)	Guthrie (1–3)	Capps (3)	16,769	7–12
	April 22	Indians	Postponed (rain); Makeup: 7/18					
20	April 23	Indians	10–3	Duensing (2–0)	Carmona (1–3)		39,459	8–12
21	April 24	Indians	4–3	Pavano (2–2)	Pérez (2–1)	Capps (4)	39,388	9–12
	April 26	Rays	Postponed (rain); Makeup: 4/28					
22	April 27	Rays	8–3	Davis (3–2)	Liriano (1–4)		36,714	9–13
23	April 28	Rays	15–3	Hellickson (2–2)	Blackburn (1–4)		38,215	9–14
24	April 28	Rays	6–1	Niemann (1–3)	Swarzak (0–1)		36,456	9–15
25	April 29	@ Royals	4–3	Wood (1–0)	Burnett (0–1)	Soria (6)	31,407	9–16
26	April 30	@ Royals	11–2	Adcock (1–0)	Duensing (2–1)		22,099	9–17

May (8–19)

#	Date	Opponent	Score	Win	Loss	Save	Attendance	Record
27	May 1	@ Royals	10–3	Hochevar (3–3)	Pavano (2–3)		18,108	9–18
28	May 3	@ White Sox	1–0	Liriano^{†} (2–4)	Jackson (2–4)		20,901	10–18
29	May 4	@ White Sox	3–2	Blackburn (2–4)	Danks (0–5)	Capps (5)	18,028	11–18
30	May 6	@ Red Sox	9–2	Baker (2–2)	Wakefield (0–1)		37,798	12–18
31	May 7	@ Red Sox	4–0	Buchholz (3–3)	Duensing (2–2)		37,234	12–19
32	May 8	@ Red Sox	9–5	Matsuzaka (3–3)	Pavano (2–4)		37,526	12–20
33	May 9	@ Red Sox	2–1	Okajima (1–0)	Hoey (0–1)		37,276	12–21
34	May 10	Tigers	10–2	Porcello (3–2)	Liriano (2–5)		38,949	12–22
35	May 11	Tigers	9–7	Benoit (1–2)	Capps (1–2)	Valverde (8)	38,938	12–23
36	May 13	Blue Jays	2–0	Romero (3–4)	Burnett (0–2)	Francisco (3)	38,809	12–24
37	May 14	Blue Jays	9–3 (11)	Rauch (2–2)	Perkins (0–1)		39,934	12–25
38	May 15	Blue Jays	11–3	Morrow (2–2)	Duensing (2–3)		39,301	12–26
39	May 16	@ Mariners	5–2	Pineda (5–2)	Baker (2–3)		14,859	12–27
40	May 17	@ Mariners	2–1	Liriano (3–5)	Hernández (4–4)	Capps (6)	16,015	13–27
41	May 18	@ Athletics	4–3 (10)	Nathan (1–1)	Fuentes (1–4)	Capps (7)	15,355	14–27
42	May 19	@ Athletics	11–1	Blackburn (3–4)	Ross (3–3)		22,320	15–27
43	May 20	@ Diamondbacks	8–7	Kennedy (5–1)	Duensing (2–4)	Paterson (1)	27,450	15–28
44	May 21	@ Diamondbacks	9–6	Heilman (3–0)	Capps (1–3)	Putz (11)	39,776	15–29
45	May 22	@ Diamondbacks	3–2	Hudson (5–5)	Burnett (0–3)	Putz (12)	31,017	15–30
46	May 23	Mariners	8–7 (10)	Wright (1–1)	Swarzak (0–2)	League (11)	37,498	15–31
47	May 24	Mariners	4–2	Blackburn (4–4)	Fister (2–5)		37,691	16–31
48	May 25	Mariners	3–0	Bédard (3–4)	Duensing (2–5)	League (12)	38,860	16–32
49	May 27	Angels	6–5	Downs (3–1)	Hoey (0–2)	Walden (11)	38,976	16–33
50	May 28	Angels	1–0 (10)	Burnett (1–3)	Takahashi (1–1)		39,824	17–33
51	May 29	Angels	6–5	Haren (5–3)	Pavano (2–5)	Walden (12)	39,867	17–34
52	May 30	@ Tigers	6–5	Alburquerque (2–1)	Burnett (1–4)	Valverde (13)	30,198	17–35
53	May 31	@ Tigers	8–7	Alburquerque (3–1)	Dumatrait (0–1)	Benoit (2)	22,649	17–36

June (17–9)

#	Date	Opponent	Score	Win	Loss	Save	Attendance	Record
54	June 1	@ Tigers	4–2	Porcello (5–3)	Baker (2–4)	Valverde (14)	24,363	17–37
55	June 2	@ Royals	8–2	Swarzak (1–2)	O'Sullivan (2–5)		14,584	18–37
56	June 3	@ Royals	5–2	Pavano (3–5)	Duffy (0–1)		32,443	19–37
57	June 4	@ Royals	7–2	Blackburn (5–4)	Hochevar (3–6)		27,861	20–37
58	June 5	@ Royals	6–0	Duensing (3–5)	Francis (2–6)		21,704	21–37
59	June 6	@ Indians	6–4	Baker (3–4)	Tomlin (7–3)	Capps (8)	15,278	22–37
60	June 7	@ Indians	1–0	Carrasco (5–3)	Liriano (3–6)	C. Perez (15)	15,498	22–38
61	June 8	@ Indians	3–2 (10)	Capps (2–3)	C. Perez (2–2)	Dumatrait (1)	15,849	23–38
62	June 9	Rangers	5–4	Hoey (1–2)	Lowe (1–1)		38,761	24–38
63	June 10	Rangers	9–3	Wilson (7–3)	Duensing (3–6)		38,907	24–39
64	June 11	Rangers	8–1	Baker (4–4)	Lewis (5–7)		40,420	25–39
65	June 12	Rangers	6–1	Liriano (4–6)	Harrison (5–6)		39,281	26–39
	June 14	White Sox	Postponed (rain); Makeup: 9/5					
66	June 15	White Sox	4–1	Pavano (4–5)	Floyd (6–6)		37,437	27–39
67	June 16	White Sox	1–0	Blackburn (6–4)	Buehrle (6–5)	Capps (9)	39,484	28–39
68	June 17	Padres	6–5	Duensing (4–6)	Richard (2–9)	Capps (10)	39,205	29–39
69	June 18	Padres	1–0	Baker (5–4)	Stauffer (2–5)	Capps (11)	40,225	30–39
70	June 19	Padres	5–4	Burnett (2–4)	Qualls (3–3)		40,655	31–39
71	June 21	@ Giants	9–2	Pavano (5–5)	Bumgarner (3–9)		41,958	32–39
72	June 22	@ Giants	5–1	Vogelsong (5–1)	Blackburn (6–5)		41,886	32–40
73	June 23	@ Giants	2–1	Lincecum (6–6)	Duensing (4–7)	Wilson (21)	42,481	32–41
74	June 24	@ Brewers	4–3	Wolf (6–4)	Baker (5–5)	Axford (20)	39,819	32–42
75	June 25	@ Brewers	11–1	Gallardo (9–4)	Liriano (4–7)		43,980	32–43
76	June 26	@ Brewers	6–2	Narveson (5–5)	Pavano (5–6)		41,624	32–44
77	June 27	Dodgers	15–0	Billingsley (7–6)	Blackburn (6–6)		39,487	32–45
78	June 28	Dodgers	6–4	Duensing (5–7)	Lilly (5–8)	Capps (12)	39,755	33–45
79	June 29	Dodgers	1–0	Baker (6–5)	De La Rosa (3–3)	Capps (13)	39,655	34–45

July (15–13)

#	Date	Opponent	Score	Win	Loss	Save	Attendance	Record
80	July 1	Brewers	6–4	Liriano (5–7)	Gallardo (9–5)		40,812	35–45
81	July 2	Brewers	8–7	Saito (1–1)	Capps (2–4)	Axford (21)	41,378	35–46
82	July 3	Brewers	9–7	Dumatrait (1–1)	Loe (2–7)	Perkins (1)	41,195	36–46
83	July 4	Rays	7–0	Duensing (6–7)	Price (8–7)		39,528	37–46
84	July 5	Rays	3–2	Baker (7–5)	Shields (8–6)	Perkins (2)	38,613	38–46
85	July 6	Rays	12–5	Howell (2–1)	Burnett (2–5)		39,841	38–47
86	July 7	@ White Sox	6–2	Pavano (6–6)	Humber (8–5)		26,395	39–47
87	July 8	@ White Sox	8–5	Blackburn (7–6)	Floyd (6–9)	Capps (14)	27,737	40–47
88	July 9	@ White Sox	4–3	Crain (5–2)	Mijares (0–1)		30,055	40–48
89	July 10	@ White Sox	6–3	Swarzak (2–2)	Peavy (4–3)	Capps (15)	30,042	41–48
All-Star Break: National League defeats American League 5–1.
90	July 14	Royals	8–4	Liriano (6–7)	Chen (5–3)		39,584	42–48
91	July 15	Royals	2–1	Collins (4–4)	Capps (2–5)	Soria (16)	39,177	42–49
92	July 16	Royals	4–3	Perkins (1–1)	Francis (3–11)	Nathan (4)	41,295	43–49
93	July 17	Royals	4–3	Duensing (7–7)	Paulino (1–3)	Nathan (5)	38,786	44–49
94	July 18	Indians	5–2	Huff (1–0)	Swarzak (2–3)	Pestano (2)	39,768	44–50
95	July 18	Indians	6–3	Carmona (5–10)	Diamond (0–1)		38,491	44–51
96	July 19	Indians	2–1	Perkins (2–1)	Perez (2–5)		38,473	45–51
97	July 20	Indians	7–5	Capps (3–5)	Sipp (4–2)	Nathan (6)	39,167	46–51
98	July 21	Tigers	6–2	Verlander (13–5)	Pavano (6–7)		40,149	46–52
99	July 22	Tigers	8–2	Scherzer (11–5)	Duensing (7–8)		40,691	46–53
100	July 23	Tigers	4–1	Baker (8–5)	Penny (7–7)	Nathan (7)	40,764	47–53
101	July 24	Tigers	5–2	Porcello (10–6)	Liriano (6–8)	Valverde (26)	40,789	47–54
102	July 25	@ Rangers	20–6	Holland (9–4)	Blackburn (7–7)		35,573	47–55
103	July 26	@ Rangers	9–8	Perkins (3–1)	Feliz (0–2)	Nathan (8)	30,581	48–55
104	July 27	@ Rangers	7–2	Duensing (8–8)	Lewis (10–8)		35,950	49–55
105	July 28	@ Rangers	4–1	Harrison (9–7)	Baker (8–6)	Feliz (21)	30,406	49–56
106	July 29	@ Athletics	9–5	Liriano (7–8)	Gonzalez (9–8)		25,656	50–56
107	July 30	@ Athletics	8–3	Moscoso (4–5)	Blackburn (7–8)		19,605	50–57
108	July 31	@ Athletics	7–3	McCarthy (4–5)	Pavano (6–8)		22,452	50–58

August (7–21)

#	Date	Opponent	Score	Win	Loss	Save	Attendance	Record
109	August 2	@ Angels	5–1	Santana (7–8)	Duensing (8–9)		37,565	50–59
110	August 3	@ Angels	11–4	Swarzak (3–3)	Piñeiro (5–6)		35,555	51–59
111	August 4	@ Angels	7–1	Haren (12–6)	Liriano (7–9)		40,365	51–60
112	August 5	White Sox	5–3	Buehrle (9–5)	Blackburn (7–9)	Sale (3)	41,364	51–61
113	August 6	White Sox	6–1	Stewart (1–1)	Pavano (6–9)		41,030	51–62
114	August 7	White Sox	7–0	Peavy (5–5)	Duensing (8–v10)		39,353	51–63
115	August 8	Red Sox	8–6	Aceves (8–1)	Perkins (3–2)	Papelbon (25)	40,080	51–64
116	August 9	Red Sox	4–3	Albers (4–3)	Capps (3–6)	Papelbon (26)	39,974	51–65
117	August 10	Red Sox	5–2	Perkins (4–2)	Lester (11–6)	Nathan (9)	40,491	52–65
118	August 12	@ Indians	3–2	R. Perez (5–2)	Perkins (4–3)	C. Perez (24)	31,364	52–66
119	August 13	@ Indians	3–1	Tomlin (12–5)	Duensing (8–11)	C. Perez (25)	30,619	52–67
	August 14	@ Indians	Postponed (rain); Makeup: 9/24					
120	August 15	@ Tigers	9–6	Liriano (8–9)	Porcello (11–8)	Nathan (10)	36,211	53–67
121	August 16	@ Tigers	7–1	Verlander (18–5)	Blackburn (7–10)		40,589	53–68
122	August 17	@ Tigers	6–5	Capps (4–6)	Valverde (2–4)	Nathan (11)	34,835	54–68
123	August 18	Yankees	8–4	Sabathia (17–7)	Duensing (8–12)		41,126	54–69
124	August 19	Yankees	8–1	Hughes (4–4)	Slowey (0–1)		41,328	54–70
125	August 20	Yankees	9–4	Liriano (9–9)	Burnett (9–10)		41,254	55–70
126	August 21	Yankees	3–0	Nova (13–4)	Dumatrait (1–2)	Rivera (33)	41,242	55–71
127	August 22	Orioles	4–1	Britton (7–9)	Pavano (6–10)	Gregg (18)	38,986	55–72
128	August 23	Orioles	8–1	Simón (4–6)	Duensing (8–13)		38,786	55–73
129	August 24	Orioles	6–1	Guthrie (6–16)	Slowey (0–2)		37,778	55–74
130	August 25	Orioles	6–1	Reyes (7–10)	Swarzak (3–4)		38,406	55–75
131	August 26	Tigers	8–1	Porcello (12–8)	Diamond (0–2)		38,918	55–76
132	August 27	Tigers	6–4	Verlander (20–5)	Pavano (6–11)	Valverde (39)	40,179	55–77
133	August 28	Tigers	11–4	Duensing (9–13)	Penny (9–10)		39,130	56–77
134	August 29	@ White Sox	3–0	Buehrle (11–6)	Slowey (0–3)	Santos (27)	24,120	56–78
135	August 30	@ White Sox	8–6	Ohman (1–3)	Swarzak (3–5)	Santos (28)	21,632	56–79
136	August 31	@ White Sox	7–6	Diamond (1–2)	Peavy (6–7)	Nathan (12)	20,346	57–79

September (6–20)

#	Date	Opponent	Score	Win	Loss	Save	Attendance	Record
137	September 2	@ Angels	13–5	Pavano (7–11)	Chatwood (6–10)		37,198	58–79
138	September 3	@ Angels	10–6	Weaver (16–7)	Dumatrait (1–3)		39,102	58–80
139	September 4	@ Angels	4–1	Piñeiro (6–6)	Slowey (0–4)	Walden (28)	36,638	58–81
140	September 5	White Sox	2–1	Humber (9–8)	Swarzak (3–6)	Sale (6)	40,252	58–82
141	September 5	White Sox	4–0	Stewart (2–3)	Diamond (1–3)		39,849	58–83
142	September 6	White Sox	3–0	Peavy (7–7)	Hendriks (0–1)	Santos (29)	36,959	58–84
143	September 7	White Sox	5–4	Pavano (8–11)	Danks (6–11)	Nathan (13)	38,359	59–84
144	September 9	@ Tigers	8–4	Penny (10–10)	Slowey (0–5)		35,996	59–85
145	September 10	@ Tigers	3–2	Alburquerque (6–1)	Perkins (4–4)		38,567	59–86
146	September 11	@ Tigers	2–1	Fister (8–13)	Diamond (1–4)	Valverde (43)	36,972	59–87
147	September 13	@ Royals	4–0	Chen (11–7)	Pavano (8–12)		25,253	59–88
148	September 14	@ Royals	7–3	Hochevar (11–11)	Hendriks (0–2)	Holland (3)	19,076	59–89
149	September 16	Indians	7–6	Jiménez (4–2)	Slowey (0–6)	C. Perez (33)	37,942	59–90
150	September 17	Indians	10–4	Gómez (4–2)	Swarzak (3–7)		38,805	59–91
151	September 18	Indians	6–5	Masterson (12–10)	Pavano (8–13)	C. Perez (34)	37,012	59–92
152	September 19	@ Yankees	6–4	Wade (6–1)	Diamond (1–5)	Rivera (43)	40,045	59–93
153	September 20	Mariners	5–4	Vargas (9–13)	Duensing (9–14)	League (35)	35,995	59–94
154	September 21	Mariners	5–4	Jimenez (1–0)	Slowey (0–7)	League (36)	36,263	59–95
155	September 22	Mariners	3–2	Nathan (2–1)	Delabar (1–1)		37,466	60–95
156	September 23	@ Indians	6–5	C. Perez (4–7)	Capps (4–7)		36,807	60–96
157	September 24	@ Indians	8–2	Putnam (1–1)	Liriano (9–10)		26,197	60–97
158	September 24	@ Indians	7–6	Hagadone (1–0)	Mijares (0–2)		30,748	60–98
159	September 25	@ Indians	6–4 (10)	Waldrop (1–0)	Sipp (6–3)		22,539	61–98
160	September 26	Royals	7–3	Paulino (4–10)	Slowey (0–8)		34,847	61–99
161	September 27	Royals	7–4	Swarzak (4–7)	O'Sullivan (2–6)		34,228	62–99
162	September 28	Royals	1–0	Pavano (9–13)	Wood (5–3)		36,488	63–99

^{†} No Hitter

== Player stats ==
=== Batting ===
Note: G = Games played; AB = At bats; R = Runs scored; H = Hits; 2B = Doubles; 3B = Triples; HR = Home runs; RBI = Runs batted in; AVG = Batting average; SB = Stolen bases

Player	G	AB	R	H	2B	3B	HR	RBI	AVG	SB
Scott Baker	2	5	0	2	1	0	0	0	.400	0
Joe Benson	21	71	3	17	6	1	0	2	.239	2
Nick Blackburn	1	2	0	0	0	0	0	0	.000	0
Alex Burnett	7	0	0	0	0	0	0	0	—	0
Drew Butera	93	234	19	39	9	1	2	23	.167	0
Matt Capps	1	0	0	0	0	0	0	0	—	0
Alexi Casilla	97	323	52	84	21	4	2	21	.260	15
Michael Cuddyer	139	529	70	150	29	2	20	70	.284	11
Brian Dinkelman	23	73	5	22	1	0	0	4	.301	2
Brian Duensing	3	4	0	0	0	0	0	0	.000	0
Phil Dumatrait	4	0	0	0	0	0	0	0	—	0
Jim Hoey	1	0	0	0	0	0	0	0	—	0
Steve Holm	6	17	1	2	1	0	0	0	.118	0
Dusty Hughes	1	0	0	0	0	0	0	0	—	0
Luke Hughes	96	287	31	64	12	0	7	30	.223	3
Jason Kubel	99	366	37	100	21	1	12	58	.273	1
Francisco Liriano	2	2	0	1	0	0	0	1	.500	0
Joe Mauer	82	296	38	85	15	0	3	30	.287	0
José Mijares	4	0	0	0	0	0	0	0	—	0
Justin Morneau	69	264	19	60	16	0	4	30	.227	0
Joe Nathan	2	0	0	0	0	0	0	0	—	0
Tsuyoshi Nishioka	68	221	14	50	5	0	0	19	.226	2
Chris Parmelee	21	76	8	27	6	0	4	14	.355	0
Carl Pavano	2	6	0	0	0	0	0	0	.000	0
Glen Perkins	4	0	0	0	0	0	0	0	—	0
Trevor Plouffe	81	286	47	68	18	1	8	31	.238	3
Jason Repko	67	133	21	30	2	0	2	11	.226	7
Ben Revere	117	450	56	120	9	5	0	30	.267	34
René Rivera	45	104	9	15	3	0	1	5	.144	0
Kevin Slowey	1	0	0	0	0	0	0	0	—	0
Denard Span	70	284	37	75	11	5	2	16	.264	6
Anthony Swarzak	1	0	0	0	0	0	0	0	—	0
Jim Thome	71	206	21	50	12	0	12	40	.243	0
Matt Tolbert	87	207	22	41	10	2	0	11	.198	3
Rene Tosoni	60	172	20	35	7	1	5	22	.203	0
Danny Valencia	154	564	63	139	28	2	15	72	.246	2
Delmon Young	84	305	26	81	16	0	4	32	.266	1
Team Totals	162	5487	619	1357	259	25	103	572	.247	92

=== Pitching ===
Note: W = Wins; L = Losses; ERA = Earned run average; G = Games pitched; GS = Games started; SV = Saves; IP = Innings pitched; R = Runs allowed; ER = Earned runs allowed; BB = Walks allowed; K = Strikeouts

Player	W	L	ERA	G	GS	SV	IP	R	ER	BB	K
Scott Baker	8	6	3.14	23	21	0	134.2	50	47	32	123
Nick Blackburn	7	10	4.49	26	26	0	148.1	91	74	54	76
Alex Burnett	2	5	5.51	66	0	0	50.2	32	31	21	33
Matt Capps	4	7	4.25	69	0	15	65.2	31	31	13	34
Michael Cuddyer	0	0	0.00	1	0	0	1.0	0	0	1	0
Scott Diamond	1	5	5.08	7	7	0	39.0	25	22	17	19
Brian Duensing	9	14	5.23	32	28	0	161.2	102	94	52	115
Phil Dumatrait	1	3	3.92	45	0	1	41.1	22	18	25	29
Eric Hacker	0	0	0.00	2	0	0	5.1	1	0	4	2
Liam Hendriks	0	2	6.17	4	4	0	23.1	16	16	6	16
Jim Hoey	1	2	5.47	26	0	0	24.2	20	15	13	14
Dusty Hughes	1	0	9.95	15	0	0	12.2	14	14	8	11
Chuck James	0	0	6.10	8	0	0	10.1	7	7	4	8
Francisco Liriano	9	10	5.09	26	24	0	134.1	81	76	75	112
Jeff Manship	0	0	8.10	5	0	0	3.1	3	3	4	2
José Mijares	0	2	4.59	58	0	0	49.0	31	25	30	30
Joe Nathan	2	1	4.84	48	0	13	44.2	26	24	14	43
Lester Oliveros	0	0	4.05	10	0	0	13.1	6	6	7	9
Carl Pavano	9	13	4.30	33	33	0	222.0	123	106	40	102
Glen Perkins	4	4	2.48	65	0	2	61.2	19	17	21	65
Anthony Slama	0	0	0.00	2	0	0	2.1	0	0	2	3
Kevin Slowey	0	8	6.67	14	8	0	59.1	44	44	5	34
Anthony Swarzak	4	7	4.32	27	11	0	102.0	53	49	26	55
Kyle Waldrop	1	0	5.73	7	0	0	11.0	7	7	6	5
Team Totals	63	99	4.58	162	162	32	1421.2	804	724	480	940

== Other post-season awards ==
- Calvin R. Griffith Award (Most Valuable Twin) – Michael Cuddyer
- Joseph W. Haynes Award (Twins Pitcher of the Year) – Glen Perkins
- Bill Boni Award (Twins Outstanding Rookie) – Ben Revere
- Charles O. Johnson Award (Most Improved Twin) – Glen Perkins
- Dick Siebert Award (Upper Midwest Player of the Year) – Jeremy Hellickson
- Bob Allison Award (Leadership Award) – Michael Cuddyer
- Mike Augustin Award ("Media Good Guy" Award) – Michael Cuddyer
  - The above awards are voted on by the Twin Cities chapter of the BBWAA
- Carl R. Pohlad Award (Outstanding Community Service) – Carl Pavano
- Sherry Robertson Award (Twins Outstanding Farm System Position Player) – Brian Dozier
- Jim Rantz Award (Twins Outstanding Farm System Pitcher) – Liam Hendriks
- Kirby Puckett Award (Alumni Community Service) – Terry Steinbach
- Herb Carneal Award (Lifetime Achievement Award) – John Gordon

== Farm system ==
Level	Team	League	Manager
AAA	Rochester Red Wings	International League	Tom Nieto
AA	New Britain Rock Cats	Eastern League	Jeff Smith
A	Fort Myers Miracle	Florida State League	Jake Mauer
A	Beloit Snappers	Midwest League	Nelson Prada
Rookie	Elizabethton Twins	Appalachian League	Ray Smith
Rookie	GCL Twins	Gulf Coast League	Ramon Borrego
