= Rene Tosoni =

Canadian baseball player (born 1986)

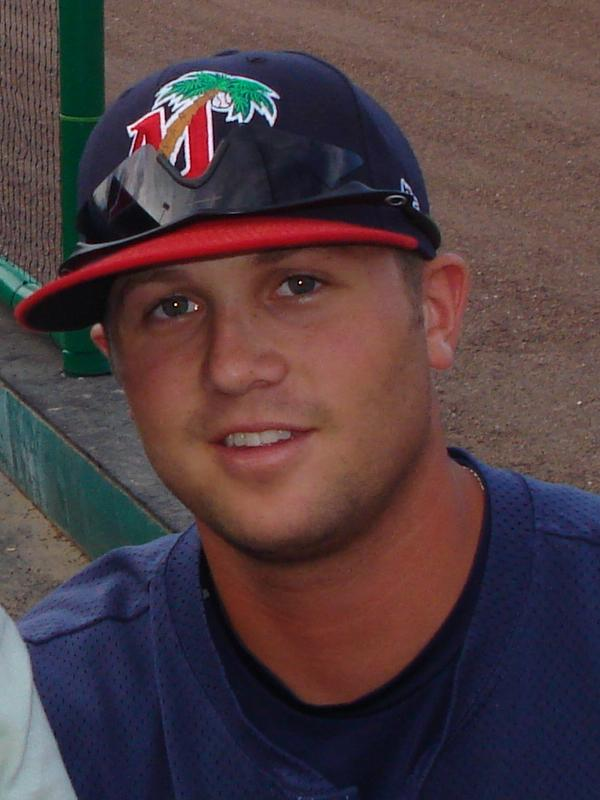
- With the Fort Myers Miracle in 2008
- Outfielder
- Born: July 2, 1986 (age 40); Toronto, Canada
- Batted: Left Threw: Right

MLB debut
- April 28, 2011, for the Minnesota Twins

Last appearance
- September 28, 2011, for the Minnesota Twins

MLB statistics
- Batting average: .203
- Home runs: 5
- Runs batted in: 22
- Stats at Baseball Reference

Teams
- Minnesota Twins (2011)
Medals
Men's baseball
Representing Canada
Baseball World Cup
Bronze medal – third place	2009 Nettuno	Team
Pan American Games
Gold medal – first place	2015 Toronto	Team
Silver medal – second place	2019 Lima	Team

Rene Michael Tosoni (born July 2, 1986) is a Canadian former professional baseball outfielder. He played in Major League Baseball (MLB) for the Minnesota Twins in 2011 and has also played in International competitions with the Canada national baseball team. He is 6 feet (1.8 m) tall and weighs 194 pounds (88 kg). He bats left-handed, yet plays his position right-handed.

== Amateur career ==
Tosoni played youth baseball for the Coquitlam Reds of the B.C. Premier Baseball League. Although he was selected by the Twins in the 34th-round of the 2004 Major League Baseball draft, he did not sign and was subsequently reselected by the Twins in the 36th-round of the 2005 Major League Baseball draft.

== Professional career ==
=== Minnesota Twins ===
==== Minor leagues ====
Although Tosoni had a brief stint with the Gulf Coast League Twins to begin the year, he spent the majority of the 2008 season assigned to the Twins' advanced A affiliate, the Fort Myers Miracle. With the Miracle, he batted .325 with one home run and 17 RBI in the first half of the 2008 season—helping his team capture the Florida State League first-half West Division title. Along with teammates Robert Delaney, Brian Dinkelman, Jeff Manship, Wilson Ramos, Anthony Slama and Danny Valencia, Tosoni was selected to represent Fort Myers in the 2008 Florida State League All-Star game, however, a broken leg prevented him from attending. He was assigned to the Miracle's seven-day disabled list, and did not play from May 16 until August 26. For the season, his average fell to an even .300 upon his short return from the disabled list at the end of the season, however, his two-run home run in the first inning was the deciding factor in the Miracle's 2–1 victory over the Dunedin Blue Jays in game one of the 2008 division playoffs.

To begin the 2009 season, Tosoni was assigned to the Twins' Double-A affiliate, the New Britain Rock Cats. He was elected to participate for the World Team at the All-Star Futures Game at Busch Stadium in St. Louis, the host location of the MLB All-Star Game. He appeared as a pinch hitter during the seventh inning and hit a go-ahead double off of Pittsburgh Pirates prospect Brad Lincoln. His performance earned him the game's MVP honours.

==== Major leagues ====
Tosoni made his major league debut on April 28, 2011. He singled in his first Major League plate appearance off of Tampa Bay Rays starter Jeremy Hellickson to lead off the third, and recorded his first RBI in the seventh inning with a single to center.

Tosoni hit his first career home run off the Detroit Tigers' Rick Porcello on May 10. On September 27, he hit what turned out to be the final home run of his major league career, and his only career grand slam in a 7–4 victory over the Kansas City Royals. For the season, Tosoni slashed .203/.275/.343 with five home runs and 22 RBI.

Tosoni batted .224 over four different levels in the minor leagues for the Twins in 2012. He was released at the end of the season.

=== Milwaukee Brewers ===
On December 28, 2012, Tosoni signed a minor league contract with the Milwaukee Brewers prior to the 2013 season. He batted .238 with 11 home runs and 46 RBI for the Double-A Huntsville Stars in his only season in the Brewers' organization.

=== Independent leagues ===
Tosoni was batting .277 with seven home runs & 57 RBIs for the Sioux City Explorers of the American Association of Independent Professional Baseball in 2014 when he was traded to the Sugar Land Skeeters of the Atlantic League of Professional Baseball. In 14 games with Sugar Land, Tosoni batted .170 with just one home run. He spent that Winter with the Perth Heat of the Australian Baseball League.

He returned to Sioux City for 2015 and Sugar Land for 2016 before retiring.

== International play ==
Tosoni played for Canada at the 2009 Baseball World Cup, 2013 & 2017 World Baseball Classic, 2015 & 2019 WBSC Premier12 and the 2015 & 2019 Pan American Games. He hit a three-run home run in the gold medal win against the United States at the 2015 Pan Am Games in Toronto.

== Coaching career ==
Tosoni was named as the hitting coach for the Florida Fire Frogs, the Atlanta Braves's High-A affiliate, for the 2018 season. He also serves as head coach of the Coquitlam Reds' Senior Reds.
