= Wilson Ramos =

Venezuelan baseball player (born 1987)

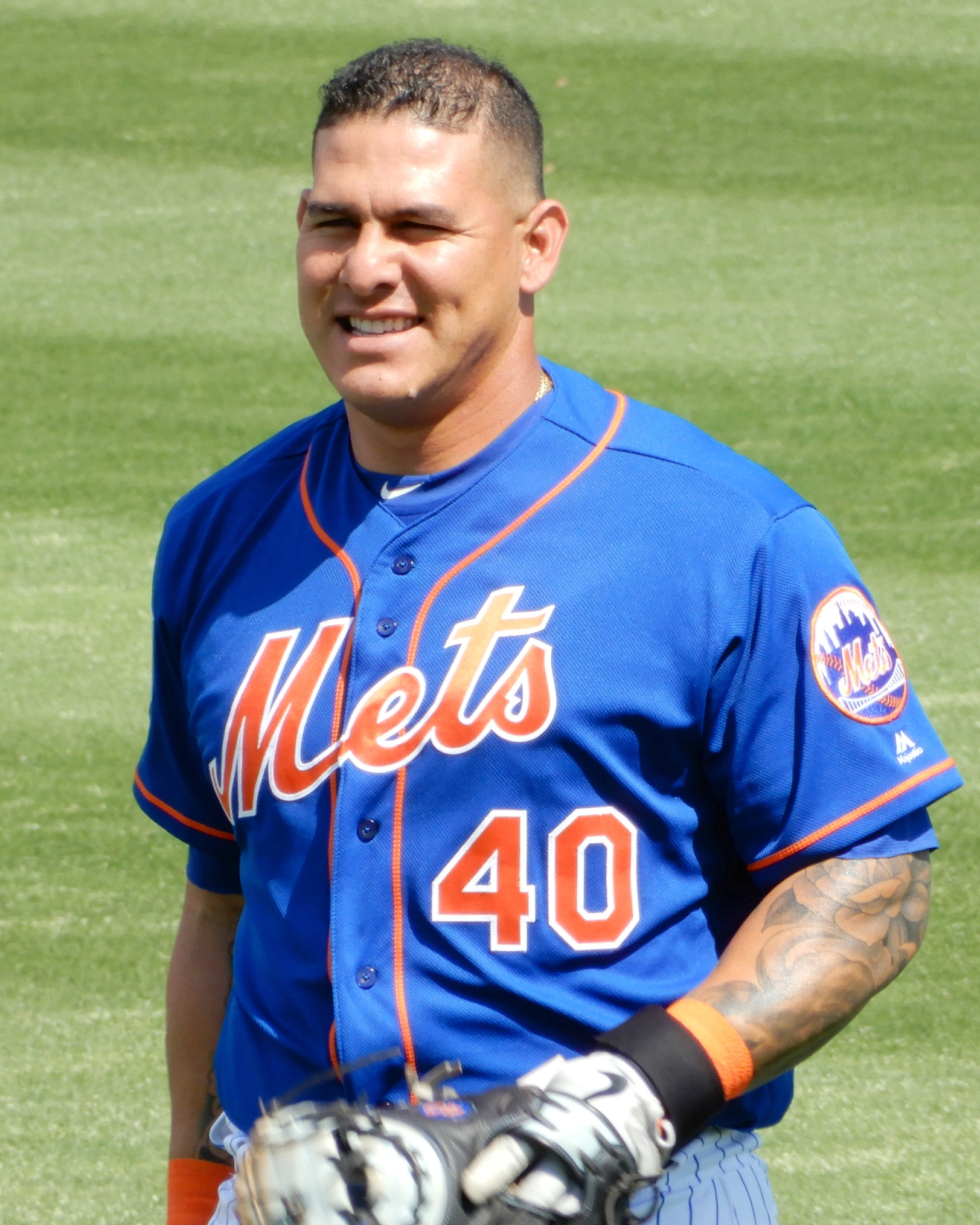
- Ramos with the New York Mets in 2019
- Catcher
- Born: August 10, 1987 (age 39); Valencia, Venezuela
- Batted: Right Threw: Right

MLB debut
- May 2, 2010, for the Minnesota Twins

Last MLB appearance
- August 29, 2021, for the Cleveland Indians

MLB statistics
- Batting average: .271
- Home runs: 136
- Runs batted in: 534
- Stats at Baseball Reference

Teams
- Minnesota Twins (2010); Washington Nationals (2010–2016); Tampa Bay Rays (2017–2018); Philadelphia Phillies (2018); New York Mets (2019–2020); Detroit Tigers (2021); Cleveland Indians (2021)

Career highlights and awards
- 2× All-Star (2016, 2018); Silver Slugger Award (2016)

Wilson Abraham Ramos Campos (born August 10, 1987), nicknamed "the Buffalo", is a Venezuelan former professional baseball catcher. He played in Major League Baseball (MLB) for the Minnesota Twins, Washington Nationals, Tampa Bay Rays, Philadelphia Phillies, New York Mets, Detroit Tigers, and Cleveland Indians. He is a two-time All-Star, and a Silver Slugger Award winner.

== Professional career ==
=== Minnesota Twins ===
Ramos signed with the Minnesota Twins as a non-drafted free agent on July 7, 2004. He caught 43% of potential base stealers in his minor league career, and had a .987 fielding percentage. In 2008, with the Twins' High-A affiliate, the Fort Myers Miracle, he batted .242 with eight home runs and 42 runs batted in (RBIs) in the first half of the 2008 season, helping his team capture the Florida State League first-half West Division title. When 2008 Florida State League All-Star catcher James Skelton of the Lakeland Flying Tigers suffered an injury, Ramos was added to the West Division All-Star team, joining teammates Rob Delaney, Brian Dinkelman, Jeff Manship, Anthony Slama and Danny Valencia.

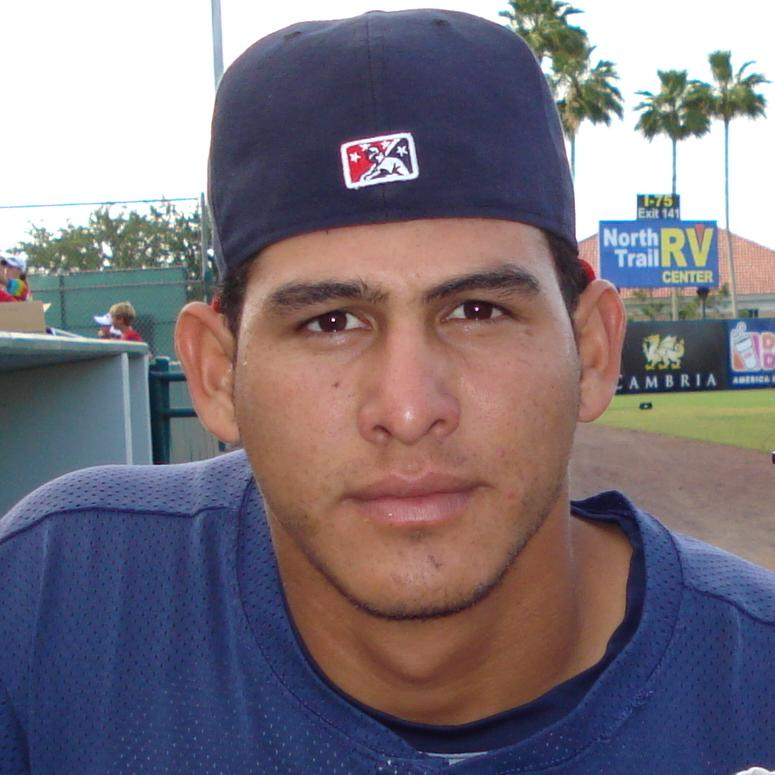
Ramos with the Fort Myers Miracle in 2008

Ramos' batting average jumped to .333 in the second half of 2008. For the season, he batted .288 with thirteen home runs, and was named to the All FSL Team. His 78 RBIs was fourth in the Florida State League.

Ramos entered the 2009 season ranked as the Twins third best prospect by Baseball America behind Aaron Hicks and Ben Revere, and #71 in all of minor league baseball. The Twins added Ramos to their 40-man roster, and invited him to Spring training. After which, he was assigned to the Twins' double A Eastern League affiliate, the New Britain Rock Cats. He broke his right index finger in May and suffered a hamstring injury in June, forcing him to do a nearly two-month rehab assignment, during which he hit three home runs in five games with the Gulf Coast League Twins. Ramos rejoined his team in August, and batted .317 with four home runs and 29 RBIs for the season.

Ramos batted over .400 in spring training in 2010. However, with Joe Mauer behind the plate, the Twins sent Ramos to the Triple-A Rochester Red Wings rather than have him serve in a back-up role in the majors.

Ramos received his first major league call-up on May 1, when Mauer was sidelined by a bruised left heel and was limited to emergency pinch hitting. Ramos took the roster spot of Pat Neshek, who was placed on the 15-day disabled list retroactive to April 29 with inflammation of the middle finger on his right hand.

On May 2, facing the Cleveland Indians, Ramos slapped a single between third base and the shortstop in the top of the second inning for his first major league hit. Ramos went four-for-five on the day with three singles and a double. He is the first Twins player since Kirby Puckett in 1984 to collect four hits in a major league debut, and the only catcher in modern history (since 1900) to collect four hits in his MLB debut. On May 3, he followed up his debut by going 3 for 4 and driving in his first RBI. All told, he played seven games with the Twins while filling in for Mauer, batting .296 with three doubles and one RBI. On May 13, with Mauer ready to return to action, and José Morales coming off the DL, Ramos was reassigned to Rochester.

=== Washington Nationals ===
On July 29, 2010, Ramos was traded to the Washington Nationals along with Joe Testa for closer Matt Capps. In 2011, Ramos was chosen by Baseball America as the catcher on its All-Rookie Team. On May 12, 2012, Ramos tore an anterior cruciate ligament (ACL) in his right knee while trying to field a passed ball in a game against the Cincinnati Reds. He was placed on the 60-day disabled list for the 2012 season.

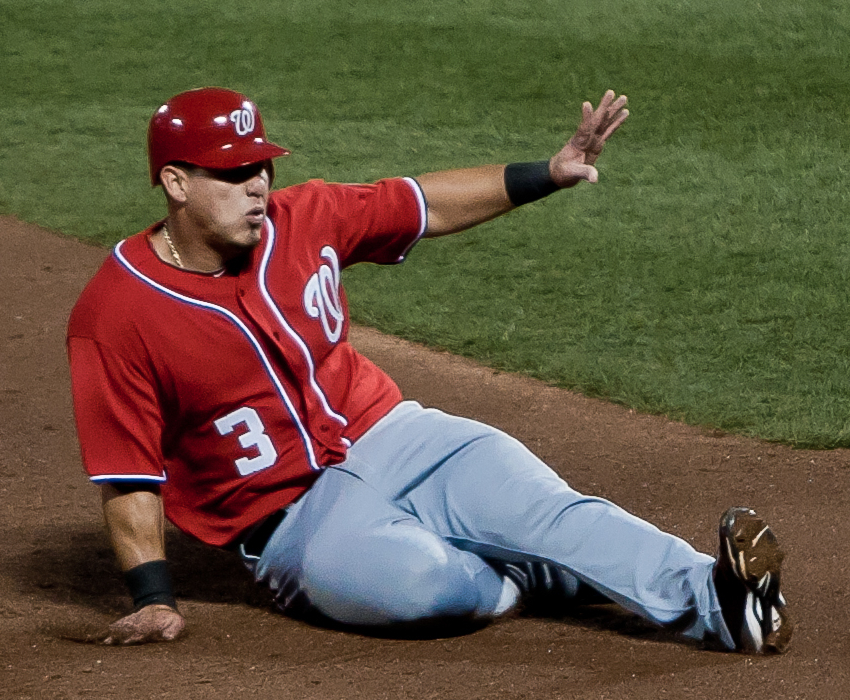
Ramos with the Nationals in 2011

Ramos and Kurt Suzuki began 2013 as the Nationals starting catchers. However, on April 13, Ramos hurt his hamstring while trying to beat out a ground ball, putting him on the disabled list, with Jhonatan Solano replacing him and Suzuki started. After being activated on April 29, Ramos quickly went back on the disabled list on May 16 with the same injury. Ramos was activated on July 4, and in his first game back against the Brewers, he went 3–4 with a three-run home run and five RBI game. His solid July, in which he hit .302/.333/.540 with four home runs and 17 RBI in 18 games, earned him more starts over Suzuki before they eventually traded Suzuki to Oakland on August 23. Ramos finished the year as the starting catcher. In 78 games with the Nationals, Ramos hit .272/.307/.470 with 16 home runs and 59 RBI.

Ramos broke his left hand in the opening game of the 2014 season and left the game. A foul tip hit his hand while he was catching. Ramos received the Tony Conigliaro Award following the 2014 season.

In 2015, Ramos hit .229 in a career-high 475 at-bats, with 15 homers, 68 RBIs and 101 strikeouts. His .258 on base percentage was the lowest of all qualified major league batters.

On June 16, 2015, Ramos had an unusual 2 home run game, where both homers came off of position players. The Nationals were blowing out the Rays (the final score was 16-4) and the Rays used position players Jake Elmore and Nick Franklin to pitch the 8th and 9th innings, in both of which Ramos homered.

Ramos is one of only 16 catchers in MLB history to have caught three no-hit games (two others have caught four no-hit games). Of those, he is the only one to catch three no-hitters in the course of 162 games, the equivalent of a single season. The three no-hitters were in the 2014 and 2015 seasons with Washington: September 28, 2014, Jordan Zimmermann pitching; June 20, 2015, Max Scherzer pitching; and October 3, 2015, Max Scherzer pitching.

On January 13, 2016, he and the Nationals agreed to a one-year, $5.35 million deal to avoid salary arbitration.

Ramos was the battery-mate for Nationals pitcher Max Scherzer on May 11, 2016, when Scherzer struck out 20 batters to tie Roger Clemens and Kerry Wood for the major league single-game strikeout record in a 9-inning game. He was named to the 2016 MLB All-Star Game. In 131 games in the 2016 season, Ramos batted .307 with 22 home runs and 80 RBI. On September 26, 2016, Ramos suffered a torn ACL, ending his season. Despite his slightly shortened season, Ramos won the Silver Slugger for National League catchers.

Despite leaving the Nationals following the 2016 season, Ramos has said he looks back on his time with the team as a period of "great moments," including his first career walk-off home run (off Seattle Mariners pitcher David Pauley) on June 21, 2011.

=== Tampa Bay Rays ===
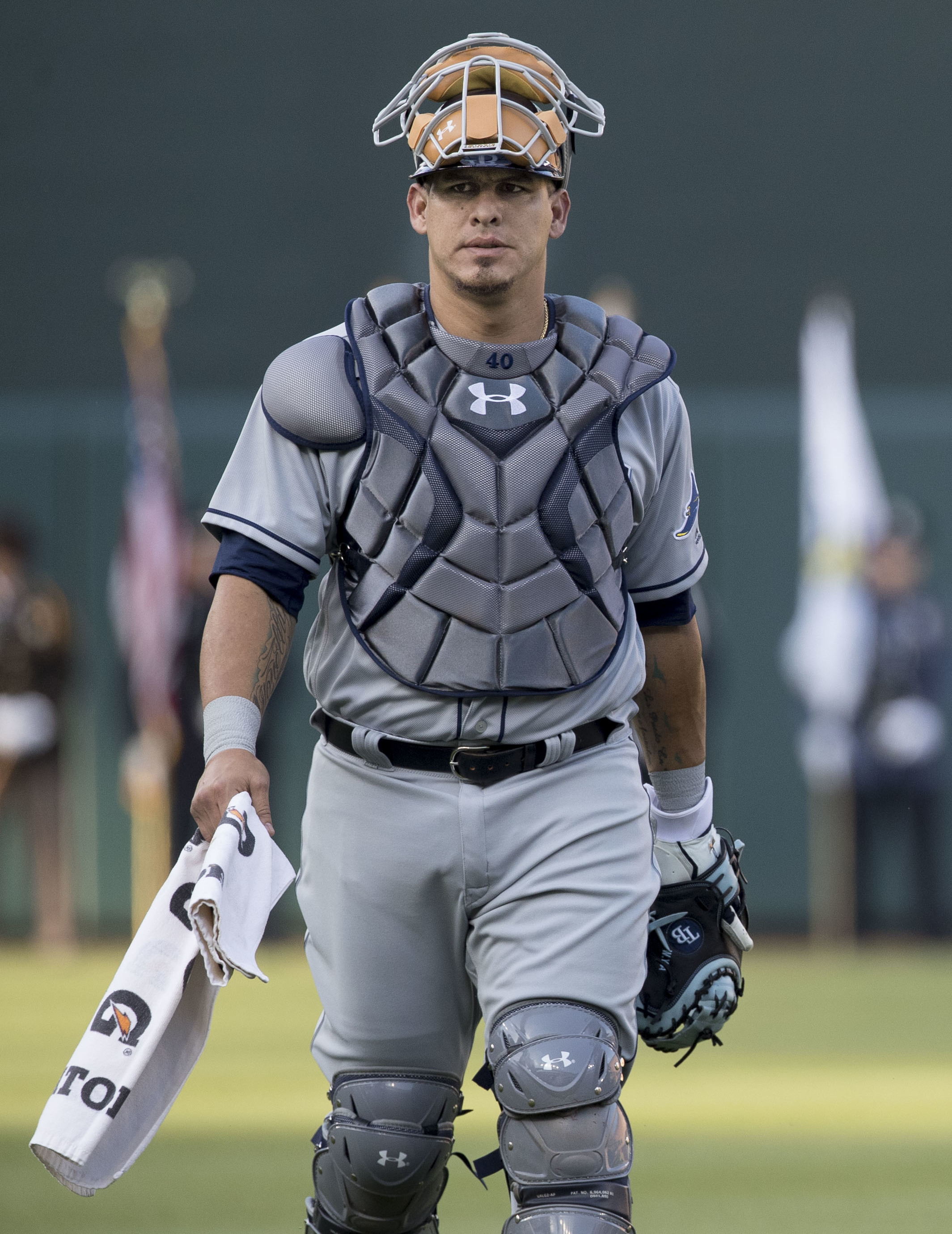
Ramos in 2017 with the Rays

On December 12, 2016, Ramos signed a two-year contract worth $12.5 million with the Tampa Bay Rays.

Ramos made his Rays debut on June 24 against the Baltimore Orioles and went 1–4 with a single. Wilson missed the first three months of the 2017 season with Tampa Bay due to his torn ACL injury he suffered the season before. He struggled at the plate his first 35 games upon his return, hitting only .194, but bounced back and hit .330 for the last 29 games of 2017. Ramos batted .260 with 11 home runs and 35 RBI, despite only playing in 64 games during the 2017 season. He had the third-slowest baserunning sprint speed of all major league players, at 22.8 feet/second.

=== Philadelphia Phillies ===
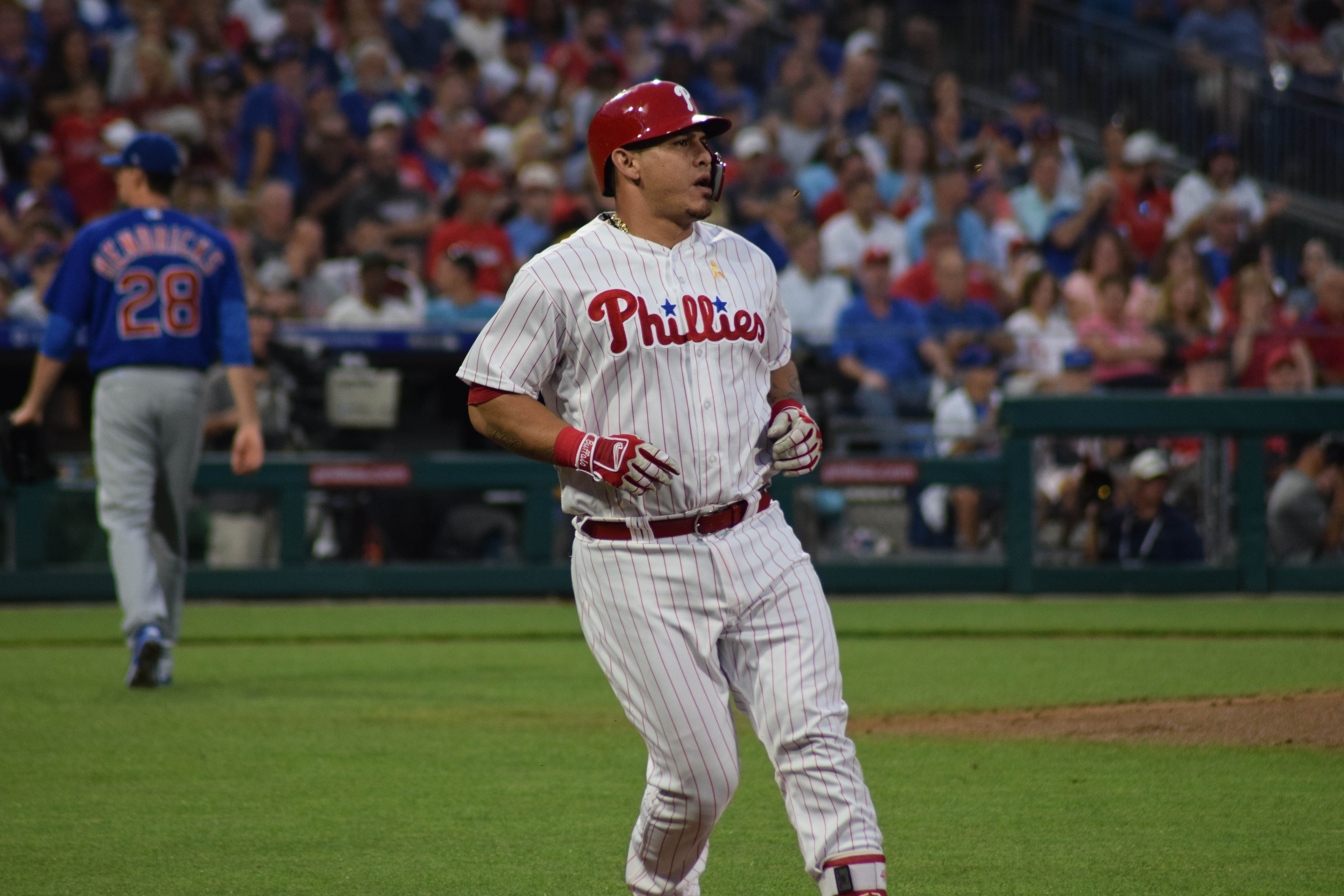
Ramos with Phillies in 2018

On July 31, 2018, Ramos was traded to the Philadelphia Phillies for a player to be named later. Between the two teams, in 2018 in aggregate he batted .306/.358/.487 with 15 home runs in 382 at bats. He again had the third-slowest baserunning sprint speed of all major league players, at 22.8 feet/second.

=== New York Mets ===
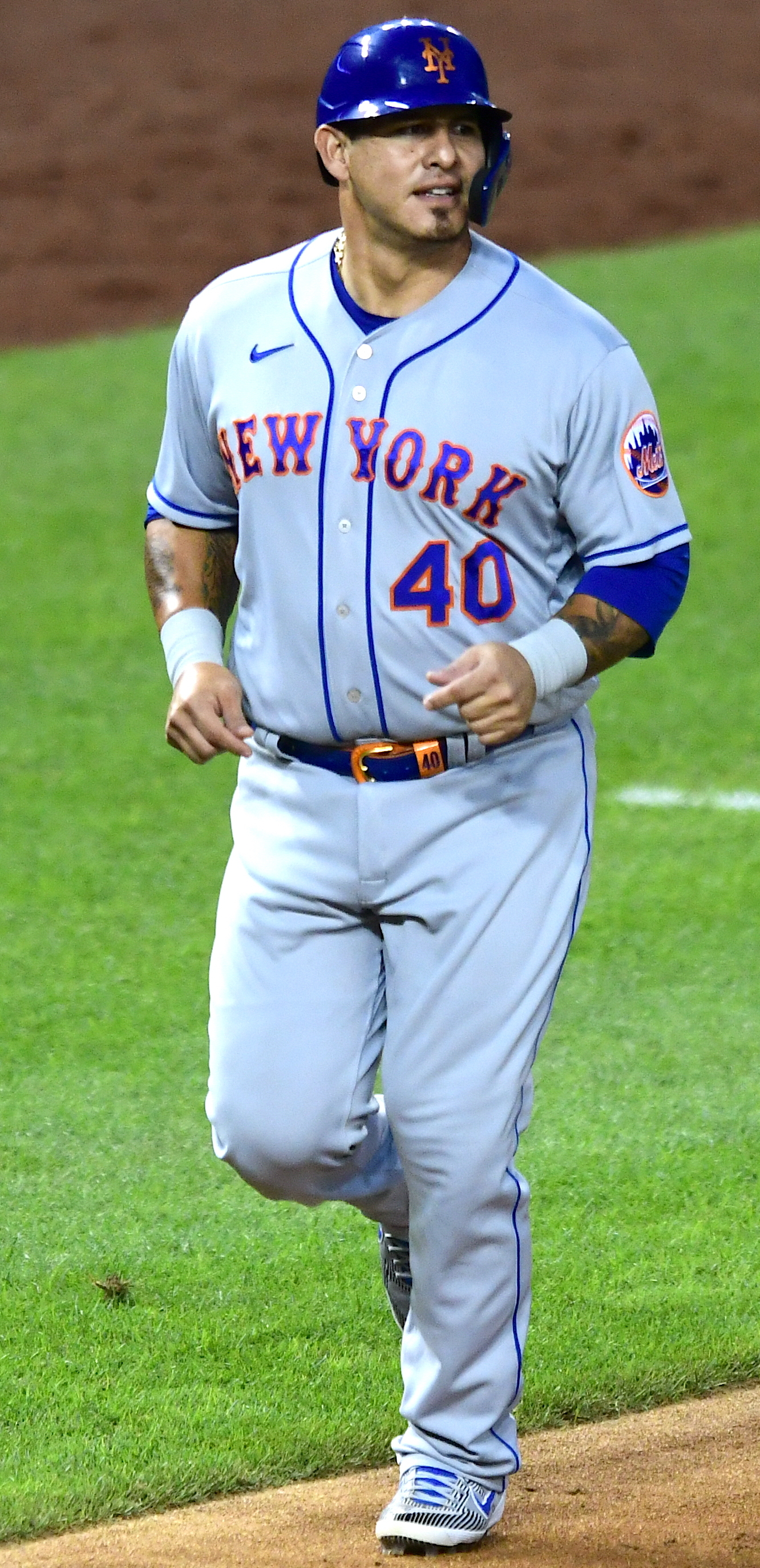
Ramos with the Mets in 2020

On December 18, 2018, the New York Mets signed Ramos to a two-year, $19 million deal. In 2019 he batted .288/.351/.416, and had the highest ground ball percentage in the major leagues (62.4%), and the lowest fly ball percentage in the majors (19.2%). On defense, he had a -13 Defensive Runs Saved (DRS) rating, the lowest in the major leagues among catchers, and led all major league catchers in stolen bases allowed, with 94.

Mets catcher Wilson Ramos had a career-best 26-game hitting streak through September 4, 2019. It was tied with David Wright in 2006–07 for the second-longest streak in Mets history, was the longest ever for a Mets catcher, and was the longest in the MLB since Freddie Freeman's 30-game streak for the Atlanta Braves in 2016.

In 2020, Ramos hit .239/.297/.387 with 5 home runs and 15 RBIs in 45 games during the 60-game season. On defense Ramos tied for the NL lead in stolen bases allowed, with 28.

On October 28, 2020, the Mets declined a $10 million option on Ramos' contract for the 2021 season. He was instead given a $1.5 million buyout and declared a free agent.

=== Detroit Tigers ===
On January 29, 2021, the Detroit Tigers signed Ramos to a one-year, $2 million contract. Ramos hit .200/.238/.392 with 6 home runs and 13 RBI in 35 games for Detroit before being designated for assignment on June 15, 2021. He was released by Detroit on June 20.

=== Cleveland Indians ===
On July 6, 2021, Ramos signed a minor league contract with the Cleveland Indians organization. Ramos was assigned to the Triple-A Columbus Clippers. The Indians selected Ramos's contract on August 6. On August 29, Ramos suffered his third career ACL tear along with an MCL sprain, which effectively ended his 2021 season. Between the two teams, in 2021 he batted .205/.248/.397, while on defense he caught 16% of attempted base stealers. Ramos became a free agent on November 3.

=== Texas Rangers ===
On August 16, 2022, Ramos signed a minor league contract with the Texas Rangers. Ramos played in 3 games for the Triple-A Round Rock Express, going 2-for-9 with a walk. He was released by the Rangers organization on September 10.

=== Acereros de Monclova ===
On April 27, 2023, Ramos signed with the Acereros de Monclova of the Mexican League. In 12 games, he batted .200/.304/.250 with eight hits and three RBI. Ramos was released on May 15.

=== Long Island Ducks and retirement ===
On June 27, 2023, Ramos signed with the Long Island Ducks of the Atlantic League of Professional Baseball. In 40 games for Long Island, he batted .233/.284/.353 with 3 home runs and 24 RBI. Ramos became a free agent following the season.

On June 15, 2025, Ramos announced his retirement from professional baseball, signing a one-day contract to retire as a member of the Washington Nationals. Two weeks later, on June 28, Ramos returned to Nationals Park in a guest pinch-hitting appearance for the Savannah Bananas, grounding out to pitcher Mat Wolf.

== Coaching Career ==
On January 15, 2026, Ramos was hired as Manager of the FCL Phillies the rookie-level affiliate of the Philadelphia Phillies.

== International career ==
=== Venezuela's Tigres de Aragua (2009 Caribbean Series) ===
Ramos was a member for the 2009 Caribbean Series champions, the Tigres de Aragua, of Venezuela. He played very well that series, hitting .385/.529/.385 and was selected as the series' all-star for the catcher position.

=== Venezuela's Tiburones de La Guaira (2024 Caribbean Series) ===
Ramos participated in the 2024 Caribbean Series, held at LoanDepot Park in Miami, Florida, as a member for the Tiburones de La Guaira, the team representing Venezuela in the series. The team was managed by former MLB player and manager Ozzie Guillen, as well as having former MLB players Carlos Zambrano and Endy Chavez on the staff as the pitching coach and 1st base coach, respectively.

== Kidnapping ==
Declassified Department of State Cable

While in Valencia, Venezuela on November 9, 2011, at approximately 6:45 pm local time, Ramos was kidnapped at gunpoint from his mother's home. According to his account four gunmen threw Ramos into the back of a Chevrolet Captiva and drove him to a mountainous region near the town of Montalban, Venezuela. On November 10, 2011 at approximately 4:00 pm local time, Ramos was reported alive. Originally back in his homeland to play during the offseason for his Venezuelan team, Tigres de Aragua, Ramos was rescued on November 12, 2011.

A declassified Department of State cable, obtained by The National Security Archive through a Freedom of Information Act request, shows that Venezuela's Corps of Scientific, Penal, Criminal Investigative Corps (CICPC) "already had the abductors under investigation prior to Ramos's kidnapping because the group had kidnapped other individuals in the same area of Valencia." Because of this the CICPC was able to immediately identify the kidnappers and their location. After being held in captivity for 50 hours, the police rescued Ramos after exchanging gunfire with the kidnappers. According to the declassified State Department cable, the exchange of gunfire was an intentional CICPC technique used to create a "diversion to disorient the abductors during the raid."

The former President of Venezuela Hugo Chavez repeatedly called CICPC for updates on the rescue mission. The declassified cable from the State Department also indicated that around 300 CICPC officials worked to rescue Ramos. Six people were arrested in relation to the kidnapping, although a Sports Illustrated speculated that these arrests may have been arbitrary.

Reflecting over the incident, Ramos said "I'm very thankful, and I feel like I've been born again."

== Personal life ==
Ramos has one child, born in August 2014. Two of his brothers are also baseball players. Natanael was a minor league catcher in the New York Mets organization, and David was a pitcher in the Nationals organization.

Ramos has expressed an interest in a career in coaching after he retires saying, "It's something I'd love to do. I know how to play baseball. I've learned a lot, and I know I can really help the young guys get the best out of themselves and move forward in this game."

== See also ==
- List of kidnappings
- List of Major League Baseball players from Venezuela
