= Chris Parmelee =

American baseball player (born 1988)

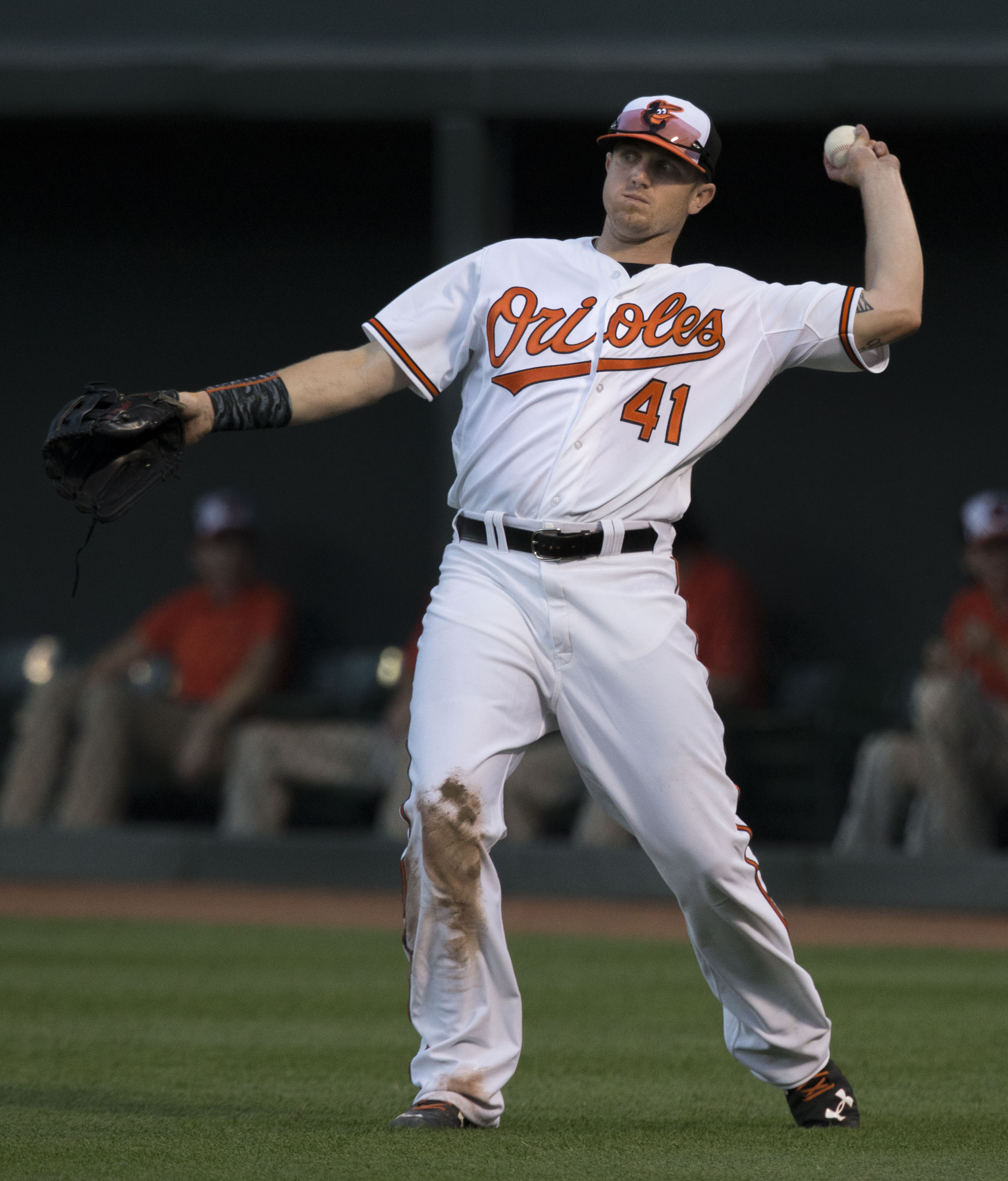
- Parmelee with the Baltimore Orioles in 2015
- Right fielder / First baseman
- Born: February 24, 1988 (age 38); Long Beach, California, U.S.
- Batted: Left Threw: Left

MLB debut
- September 6, 2011, for the Minnesota Twins

Last MLB appearance
- June 9, 2016, for the New York Yankees

MLB statistics
- Batting average: .248
- Home runs: 30
- Runs batted in: 98
- Stats at Baseball Reference

Teams
- Minnesota Twins (2011–2014); Baltimore Orioles (2015); New York Yankees (2016)

Christopher Matthew Parmelee (born February 24, 1988) is an American former professional baseball right fielder and first baseman. He stands 6 feet 1 inch (1.85 m) and weighs 210 pounds (95 kg), and bats and throws left handed. He played in Major League Baseball (MLB) for the Minnesota Twins, Baltimore Orioles and New York Yankees.

== Minor league career ==
The Twins selected Parmelee with their first round (20th overall) pick in the 2006 Major League Baseball draft after he hit .407 with 11 home runs and 26 runs batted in (RBIs) as a senior at Chino Hills High School in Chino Hills, California. As soon as the Twins signed Parmelee, he instantly became one of the organizations top power hitting prospects, and was projected to be a potential impact player in the middle of their lineup within the next few years.

Parmelee began his professional career with the Twins' rookie league affiliate, the Gulf Coast Twins. After batting .279 with eight home runs in 45 games, he earned a promotion to the single-A Beloit Snappers. He returned to Beloit for the 2007 season, where he hit .239 with a team-leading 15 home runs in 128 games. He returned to Beloit again in 2008 due to a glut of outfielders in the Twins farm system. Although he missed a good part of the season due to a broken wrist and had the same .239 batting average, he nearly equaled his output from 2007, hitting 14 home runs in just 69 games while increasing his on-base percentage from .313 to .385 and his slugging percentage from .414 to .496.

Parmelee began the 2009 season assigned to the Twins' advanced-A affiliate, the Fort Myers Miracle, with whom he batted .244 with five home runs and 28 RBIs in the first half of the season. He joined teammates Carlos Gutiérrez, Chris Cates, and Ben Revere as All-stars for the Florida State League's Southern division, and won the home run derby held before the game.

Parmelee started the 2010 season with Fort Myers, but was quickly promoted to the double-A New Britain Rock Cats. In his first season at that level, he batted .275 in 111 games, but his power numbers dipped, as he hit just six home runs. This led to Parmelee returning to New Britain for the 2011 season, where he improved his numbers to a .287 batting average with 13 homers in 142 games.

== Major league career ==
=== Minnesota Twins ===
==== 2011 ====
After clubbing 74 home runs and driving in 370 runs over six years in the minor leagues, Parmelee received his first call to the majors in September 2011. He, Joe Benson and Liam Hendriks all started for the Twins in their big league debuts on September 6. He hit a single in his first major league at bat to lead off the second, but was stranded at third as the Twins were shut out by Chicago White Sox pitcher Jake Peavy. The following day, he collected his first two major league RBIs with a double to center off John Danks in the Twins' 5-4 victory over the White Sox. On September 17 against the Cleveland Indians, Parmelee went 3-for-3 and hit his first major league home run in the eighth inning off Josh Judy. He finished the year with a .355 average, four home runs and 14 RBI in 21 games.

==== 2012 ====
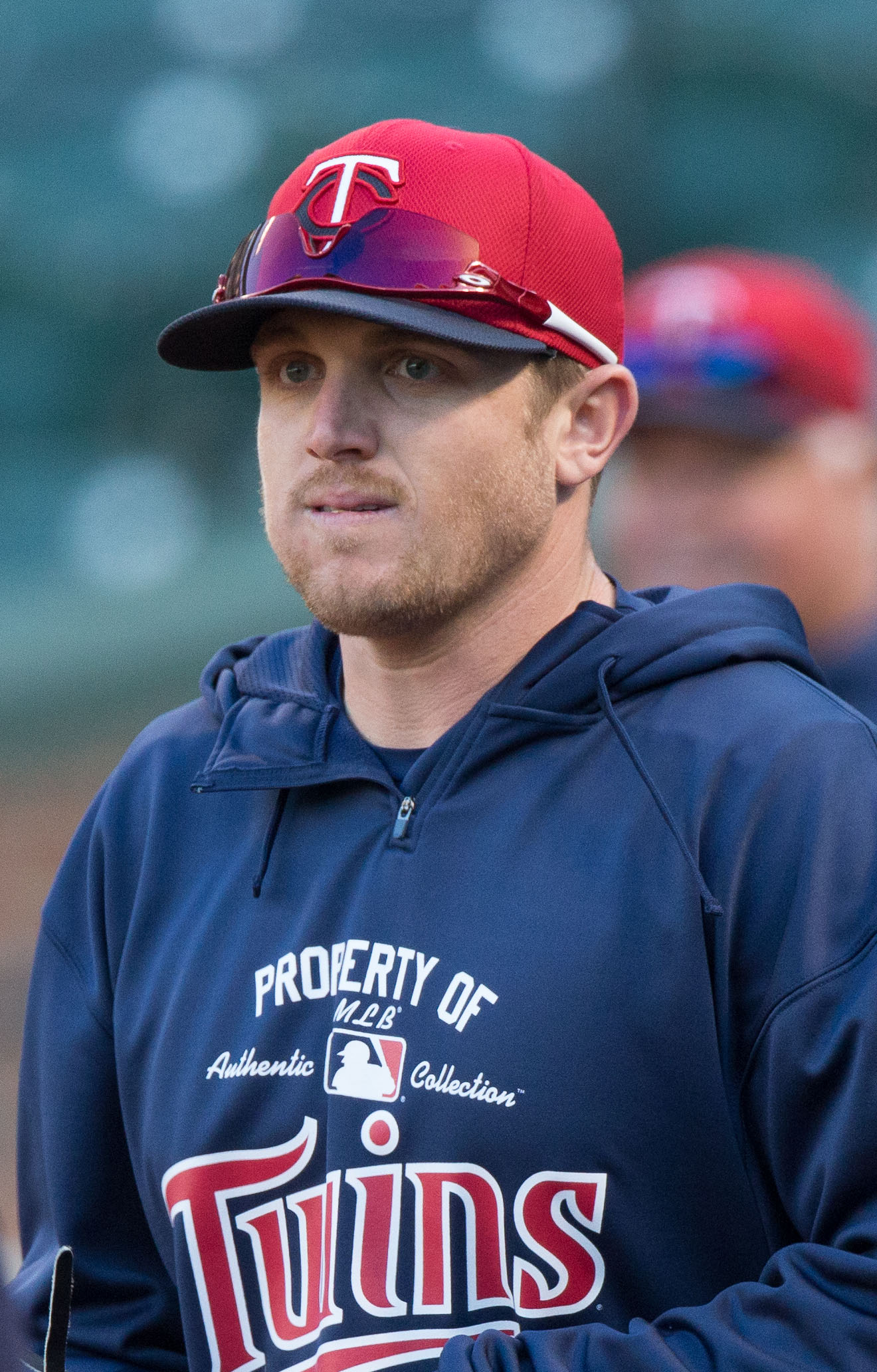
Parmelee with the Twins in 2013

With the Twins' regular first baseman, Justin Morneau, starting the season as the designated hitter, Parmelee opened the 2012 season with the Twins as their starting first baseman despite not yet having played at triple-A. Morneau was placed on the disabled list in April, but Parmelee struggled as well, batting just .179 and without a home run through mid-May and was optioned to the triple-A Rochester Red Wings on May 16 when Morneau was activated.

Parmelee hit well in his first taste of the highest level of the minor leagues, batting .375 with four homers, and was brought back to the major leagues on June 7. He was returned to the minors on July 5, promoted briefly again while Morneau was on paternity leave in late July, then finally called up for good on August 29. Overall, he had hit .338 at Rochester with 17 home runs in just 64 games, good enough to lead the team. In his major league time, he finished with a .229 average, five home runs and 20 RBI in 64 games.

==== 2013 ====
With Morneau recovered, the Twins made Parmelee their starting right fielder on Opening Day of the 2013 season. In early May, Parmelee started sharing right field duties with Oswaldo Arcia. Ryan Doumit also got time in right field. Parmelee also got starts at first base filling in for Justin Morneau. At the All-Star break, Parmelee was optioned to Rochester. At the time, Parmelee was hitting .223 with 8 HR and 20 RBI. Playing first base and right field for Rochester, in 45 games, he hit .231 with 3 HR and 22 RBI. On September 9, Parmelee was recalled by the Twins after Rochester's season was over. Parmelee split first base duties with Chris Colabello to finish the season. In 101 games with Minnesota in 2013, Parmelee hit .228 with 8 HR and 24 RBI.

==== 2014 ====
Parmelee was outrighted off the Twins roster on March 27, 2014. He was re-added to the roster on May 9. Parmelee was designated for assignment on December 13 to clear a roster spot for Ervin Santana.

=== Baltimore Orioles ===
Parmelee signed a minor league contract with the Baltimore Orioles before the 2015 season. He was called up by the Orioles on June 16. In his first game with the team, against the Philadelphia Phillies later that day, he went 4-for-6, hitting 2 home runs as the Orioles beat the Phillies 19-3. The very next day, Parmelee went 1-for-3, hitting another home run and scoring two runs as the Orioles beat the Phillies. He was designated for assignment on July 31 to make room for newly acquired outfielder Gerardo Parra.

=== New York Yankees ===
On February 22, 2016, Parmelee signed a minor league deal with the New York Yankees. He began the 2016 season with the Triple-A Scranton/Wilkes-Barre RailRiders. When Mark Teixeira went on the disabled list on June 4, the Yankees promoted Parmelee to the major leagues. In Parmelee's first start with the Yankees, on June 8, he hit two home runs, and a double, driving in 3 runs. He became the first Yankee to hit two home runs in his first start with the team since Roger Maris in 1960. The next day, he suffered a left hamstring strain, and was placed on the disabled list. He elected to become a free agent after the season.

=== Oakland Athletics ===
On November 30, 2016, Parmelee signed a minor league contract with the Oakland Athletics that included an invitation to spring training. He played 41 games for the Triple-A Nashville Sounds before being placed on the disabled list on June 6. He was released by the Athletics on June 13.

=== Miami Marlins ===
On July 26, 2017, Parmelee signed a minor league contract with the Miami Marlins. In 13 games for the Triple–A New Orleans Baby Cakes, he hit .273/.468/.455 with one home run and four RBI. Parmelee elected free agency following the season on November 6.

=== Los Angeles Dodgers ===
On March 9, 2019, Parmelee signed a minor league contract with the Los Angeles Dodgers organization. He was selected to the mid-season Texas League All-Star Game while playing for the Double–A Tulsa Drillers. In 87 total games for Tulsa, Parmelee batted .236/.357/.458 with 16 home runs and 52 RBI. He elected free agency following the season on November 4.
