= Anthony Slama =

American baseball player (born 1984)

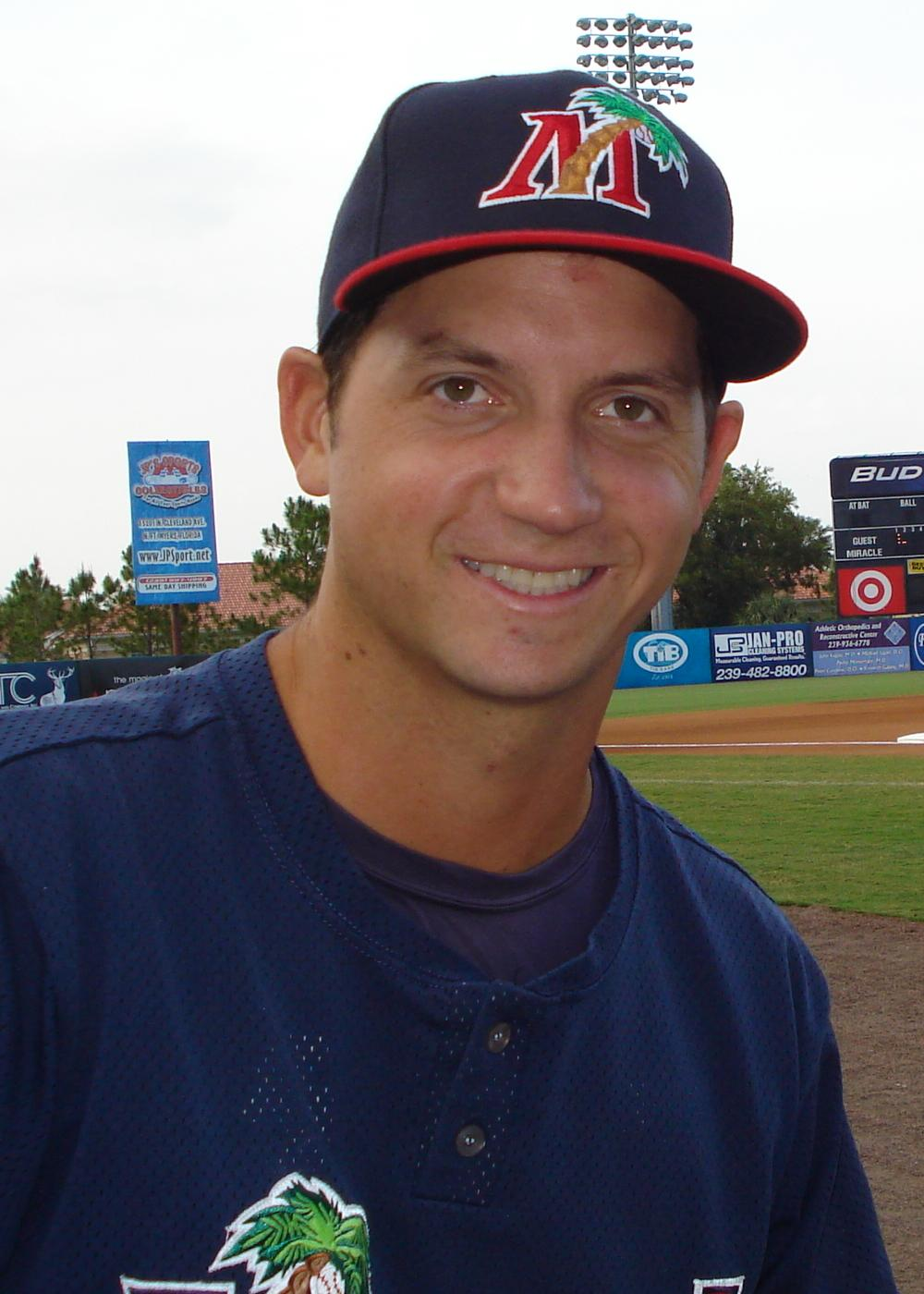
- Slama with the Fort Myers Miracle
- Relief pitcher
- Born: January 6, 1984 (age 42); Orange, California, U.S.
- Batted: Right Threw: Right

MLB debut
- July 21, 2010, for the Minnesota Twins

Last appearance
- June 4, 2011, for the Minnesota Twins

MLB statistics
- Win–loss record: 0–1
- Earned run average: 5.14
- Strikeouts: 8
- Stats at Baseball Reference

Teams
- Minnesota Twins (2010–2011)

Anthony Thomas Slama (born January 6, 1984) is an American former professional baseball relief pitcher. He is 6'3", and weighs 207 lbs., and bats and throws right-handed. He played in Major League Baseball (MLB) for the Minnesota Twins.

== Career ==
=== College ===
After playing at Mater Dei High School, Slama played two seasons of college baseball at Santa Ana College from 2004-2005, before transferring to the University of San Diego, where he played for the Toreros in 2006. Slama was selected in the 39th round of the 2006 Major League Baseball draft by the Minnesota Twins. However, he did not sign and returned to San Diego for the 2007 season. Prior to the 2007 draft, he signed a professional contract with Minnesota.

=== Minnesota Twins ===
Slama began his professional career in 2007 with the rookie-level Elizabethton Twins, and after only six appearances where he struck out 10 in 7 1/3 innings, earned a promotion to the Single-A Beloit Snappers.

Slama spent the 2008 season with the Twins' High-A affiliate, the Fort Myers Miracle. He compiled a 2-0 record with a 0.50 earned run average and 12 saves in the first half of the 2008 season—helping Fort Myers capture the Florida State League first-half West Division title. Along with teammates Rob Delaney, Brian Dinkelman, Jeff Manship, Wilson Ramos, and Danny Valencia, Slama represented the Miracle in the 2008 Florida State League All-Star game.

For the season, he went 4-1 with a 1.01 ERA, 25 saves and 110 strikeouts in 71 innings to earn All-FSL Team honors, the Jim Rantz Award Twins' Minor League Pitcher of the Year and MILB.com's "Best Class A Reliever." He recorded the save in both division play off games against the Dunedin Blue Jays, and in the Miracle's one win against the Daytona Cubs in the FSL championship series. His 13.94 strikeouts-per-nine innings ranked third among all Minor League relievers, and his .173 opponents' batting average ranked eighth.

On July 20, 2010, Slama was called up to the major leagues for the first time, and Alex Burnett was sent down to make room for him. He made his major league debut for the Twins the following day, against the Cleveland Indians. Slama worked one inning, striking out two in finishing a victory. Slama spent most of 2011 with Triple-A Rochester, but did play 2 games with the Twins in late May/early June.

He spent all of 2012 in Rochester, and began 2013 there as well. On June 13, 2013, Slama was released by the Twins after an 0-4 start with a 13.50 ERA. Over parts of 5 seasons with Rochester, Slama went 6-10 with a 3.17 ERA in 137 appearances with 38 saves, striking out 200 in 167 2/3 innings.

=== York Revolution ===
On July 5, 2013, Slama signed with the York Revolution of the independent Atlantic League of Professional Baseball.

=== Southern Maryland Blue Crabs ===
On February 17, 2014, Slama signed with the Southern Maryland Blue Crabs, also of the Atlantic League.

=== Los Angeles Dodgers ===
On August 15, 2014, Slama signed a minor league contract with the Los Angeles Dodgers and was assigned to the Double-A Chattanooga Lookouts. He only appeared in five games for the Lookouts and was 0–2 with a 6.00 ERA before finishing the season on the inactive list.
