= Brian Dinkelman =

American baseball player, coach, & manager (born 1983)

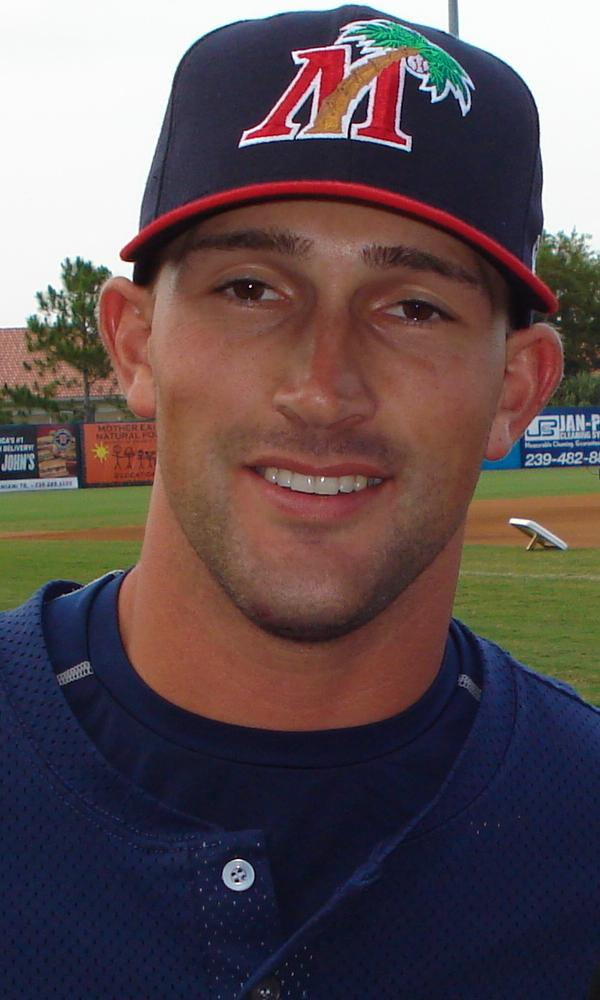
- Dinkelman in 2008 with the Miracle
- Second baseman/Outfielder
- Born: November 10, 1983 (age 42); Centralia, Illinois, U.S.
- Batted: Left Threw: Right

MLB debut
- June 4, 2011, for the Minnesota Twins

Last MLB appearance
- September 28, 2011, for the Minnesota Twins

MLB statistics
- Batting average: .301
- Home runs: 0
- Runs batted in: 4
- Stats at Baseball Reference

Teams
- Minnesota Twins (2011)

Brian Adam Dinkelman (born November 10, 1983) is an American former professional baseball second baseman who is the manager of the St. Paul Saints, the Triple-A minor-league affiliate of the Minnesota Twins. Dinkelman was drafted by the Minnesota Twins in the eighth round of the 2006 MLB draft, and made his MLB debut on June 4, 2011. He last played professional baseball in 2013, transitioning into coaching in the Twins organization. He previously served as the manager for the Cedar Rapids Kernels, the High-A affiliate of the Twins and the Wichita Wind Surge, the Double-A affiliate of the Twins.

== Early life ==
Brian Adam Dinkelman was born on November 10, 1983, in Centralia, Illinois. He attended Centralia High School, where he played basketball and golf along with baseball. After graduation, Dinkelman played baseball at McKendree College in Lebanon, Illinois, for the McKendree Bearcats. Dinkelman won the American Midwest Conference Player of the Year award from 2004 to 2006, and won the National Association of Intercollegiate Athletics (NAIA) Player of the Year award his senior year. At McKendree, Dinkelman set 25 career school records, as well as five NAIA career records.

After college, Dinkelman was drafted by the Minnesota Twins in the eighth round of the 2006 MLB draft with the 246th overall pick. He signed with the team on June 8, 2006 for a $13,000 signing bonus.

== Playing career ==
In his first professional season, Dinkelman played for the Elizabethton Twins of the Rookie Appalachian League. In 46 games played, Dinkelman batted .298 with four home runs and 32 runs batted in. Defensively, Dinkelman predominately played as a second baseman. In 2007, he was selected to play in the Western Division of the Midwest League All-Star game, representing the Beloit Snappers. In June of the same year, he was promoted to the Class A-Advanced Fort Myers Miracle; combined, Dinkelman batted .269 in 131 games played, and was voted the "Mightiest Miracle Player" (the favorite Fort Myers Miracle player) by fans.

In 2008, Dinkelman continued his professional career, playing for the Miracle as well as the New Britain Rock Cats. Along with teammates Rob Delaney, Jeff Manship, Anthony Slama and Danny Valencia, Dinkelman represented the Fort Myers Miracle in the Florida State League All-Star game. He finished the season with the AA Rock Cats, batting a combined .272 with four home runs, 40 RBI, and 12 stolen bases.

From May 1–7, 2009, Dinkelman was the Twins' Minor League Player of the Week. He was named to his third consecutive All-Star team after batting .299 with four home runs and 43 RBI in the first half of the season. For the year, Dinkelman posted club highs in hits, doubles and walks to help the Rock Cats make their first post-season appearance since 2003. After the season, Dinkelman was named to the Eastern League All-Star Post-Season team as a utility player.

Dinkelman spent the entire 2010 season with the Triple-A Rochester Red Wings. He led his team in games played (137), total bases (199), and hits (139), while playing right field, left field and second base. He began the 2011 season with the Red Wings before being promoted to the Minnesota Twins on June 2, 2011, to replace shortstop Trevor Plouffe. On June 4, 2011, Dinkelman made his MLB debut, where he was hit by a pitch and intentionally walked, while also recording a single.

He was outrighted to the Red Wings on June 16, and recalled to the Twins on September 5, 2011. In 23 games with the Twins, Dinkelman batted .301, with four RBI and no home runs. On October 20, after being outrighted off the roster, he declared free agency.

On November 10, 2011, Dinkelman signed a minor league contract to return to the Minnesota Twins. He played all of 2012 with Rochester, but he missed two months of the season from a hand injury. In 74 games, he hit .252 with 4 HR and 32 RBI.

On October 29, 2012, Dinkelman re-signed with the Twins. Dinkelman once again played the season in Rochester, and was used mostly off the bench. In 84 games in 2013, he hit .215 with 6 HR and 23 RBI. Over 4 seasons and 427 games with Rochester in his career, he hit .248 with 21 HR and 150 RBI.

== Post-playing career ==
Dinkelman became a hitting coach with the Gulf Coast League Twins in 2015, and the Cedar Rapids Kernels from 2016 to 2018. He managed the Kernels from 2019-2024, and was named the 2023 Minor League Manager of the Year by Baseball America.

In January 2025, Dinkelman was named manager of the Wichita Wind Surge, the Texas League Double-A affiliate of the Minnesota Twins.

On January 15, 2026, Dinkelman was named as the manager of the St. Paul Saints, the International League Triple-A affiliate of the Twins, after Toby Gardenhire was named major league field coordinator for the Twins.
