= Alex Burnett =

American baseball player (born 1987)

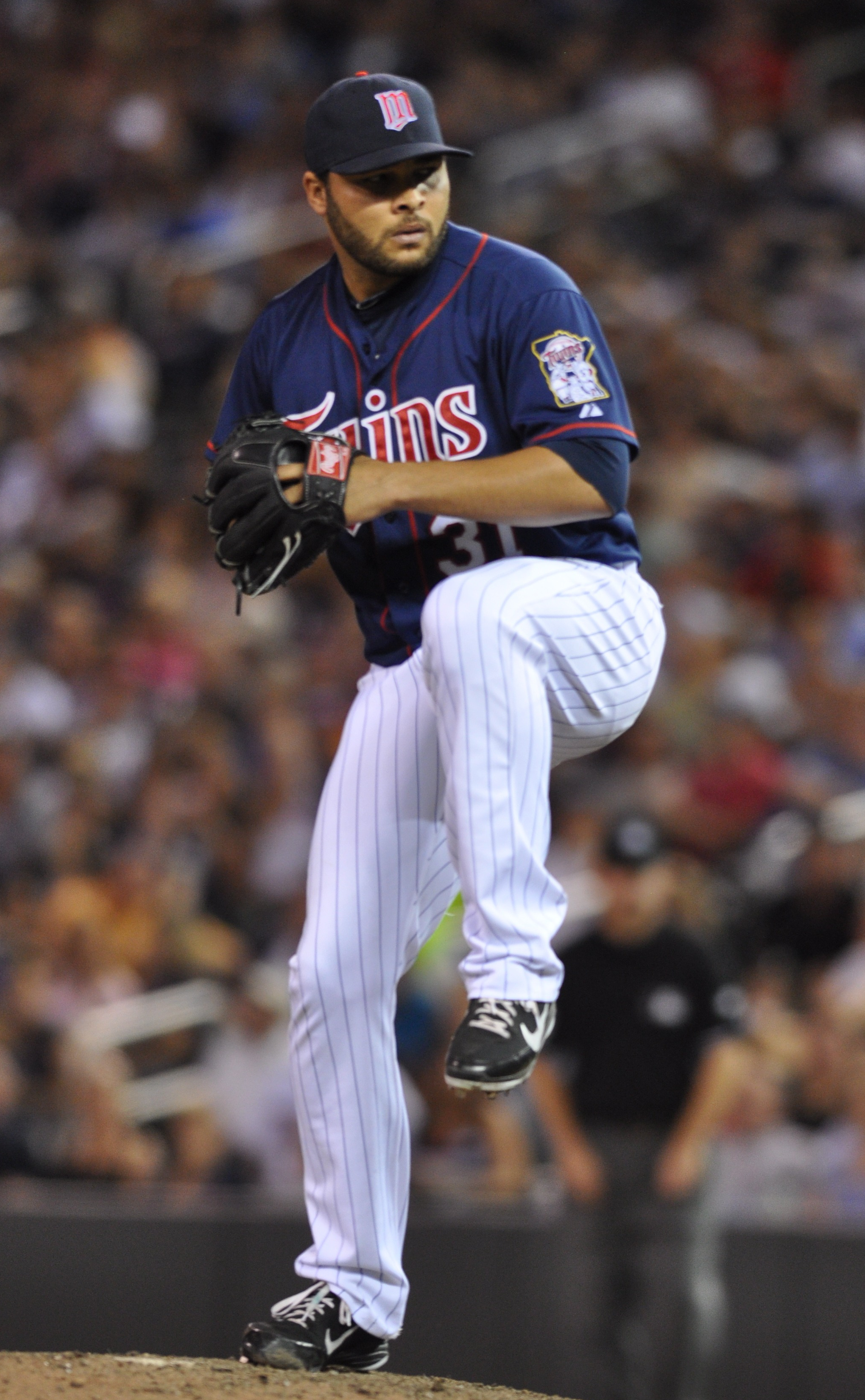
- Burnett with the Minnesota Twins
- Pitcher
- Born: July 26, 1987 (age 39); Anaheim, California, U.S.
- Batted: Right Threw: Right

MLB debut
- April 8, 2010, for the Minnesota Twins

Last appearance
- May 29, 2013, for the Chicago Cubs

MLB statistics
- Win–loss record: 8–11
- Earned run average: 4.70
- Strikeouts: 108
- Stats at Baseball Reference

Teams
- Minnesota Twins (2010–2012); Baltimore Orioles (2013); Chicago Cubs (2013)

Alex James Burnett (born July 26, 1987) is an American former professional baseball right-handed relief pitcher. He is 6 feet 0 inches (1.83 m) tall and weighs 215 pounds (98 kg). He was drafted in the 12th round of the 2005 Major League Baseball draft by the Minnesota Twins.

== Minor league career ==
In 2007, Burnett was selected to Midwest League All-Star Game while playing with the Twins' low A affiliate, the Beloit Snappers. He ended the season with a 3.02 earned run average, which was fifth best in the league.

Burnett compiled a 5 – 2 record with a 3.36 ERA over 14 appearances (12 starts) in the first half of the 2008 season—helping his team capture the Florida State League first-half West Division title. Scout.com called him one of the best right-handed pitchers in the Twins' organization.

On August 21, 2008, in only six innings, Burnett struck out a career best ten Lakeland Flying Tigers in the Miracle's 8–1 win at Joker Marchant Stadium in Lakeland. Burnett, Carlos Gutiérrez and Anthony Slama combined on a new season-high 17 strikeouts on the night.

His best pitching performance of the season, however, may have been his last. With the Miracle already leading their first round playoff series against the Dunedin Blue Jays 1–0, Burnett pitched six innings of shutout ball, giving up only two hits against the second half division winners. The Miracle went on to win the game 3–1 to advance to the second round of the playoffs for the first time since 1995.

== MLB career ==
=== Minnesota Twins ===
He was converted to a reliever in 2009, and combined to go 3–3 with a 1.85 ERA, thirteen saves and 78 strikeouts in 78 innings for the Fort Myers Miracle and the Twins' Double-A affiliate, the New Britain Rock Cats. He made the Twins out of Spring training 2010 without having ever played at the triple-A level. Burnett made his major league debut on April 8, 2010, retiring all three batters he faced in a 10–1 win over the Los Angeles Angels of Anaheim.

On April 15, 2010, the Twins sent Burnett to their triple-A affiliate, the Rochester Red Wings. Twins manager Ron Gardenhire said the move was partly so Burnett could get more regular playing time. He was recalled to the Twins just two days later, when they placed reliever José Mijares on the disabled list. Burnett continued to pitch regularly for the Twins, and remained on the roster when Mijares was reactivated.

Burnett earned his first major league win on June 5, 2010, over the Oakland A's.

On July 19, the Twins optioned Burnett to Rochester and recalled pitcher Anthony Slama. He remained in Rochester until he was recalled on September 3, earning a win in his first appearance back in the majors.

=== Toronto Blue Jays ===
On March 29, 2013, Burnett was claimed by the Toronto Blue Jays, and optioned to their new Triple-A affiliate Buffalo Bisons. On April 10, Burnett was designated for assignment by the Blue Jays to make room for waiver claim Casper Wells. He was claimed off waivers by the Baltimore Orioles on April 12, and sent to the Triple-A Norfolk Tides. He was called up by the Orioles on April 22, and sent back to Norfolk on April 24. Burnett was called up again on May 9 when Miguel González was placed on the 15-day disabled list. He was optioned back to Norfolk on May 11, and recalled again on May 14 when Wei-Yin Chen was placed on the disabled list. He was optioned back to Norfolk again on May 18, but was designated for assignment on May 23 to make room on the roster for Kevin Gausman.

=== Chicago Cubs ===
On May 27, 2013, Burnett was claimed off waivers by the Chicago Cubs. The Cubs optioned him to the Triple-A Iowa Cubs on May 30. He was designated for assignment on June 1, 2013, and sent back to the Iowa Cubs on June 3. He elected free agency on November 14, 2013.

=== Sioux City Explorers ===
On June 13, 2014, Burnett signed with the Sioux City Explorers of the American Association of Independent Professional Baseball. He became a free agent after the season. In 28 games 54 innings of relief he went 6-1 with a 2.17 ERA with 50 strikeouts and 3 saves.

=== Guerreros de Oaxaca ===
On April 1, 2015, he signed with the Guerreros de Oaxaca of the Mexican Baseball League. He was released on April 20, 2015. In 7 games 8.2 innings of relief he struggled going 1-0 with a 6.23 ERA with 12 strikeouts.
