= Trevor Plouffe =

American baseball player (born 1986)

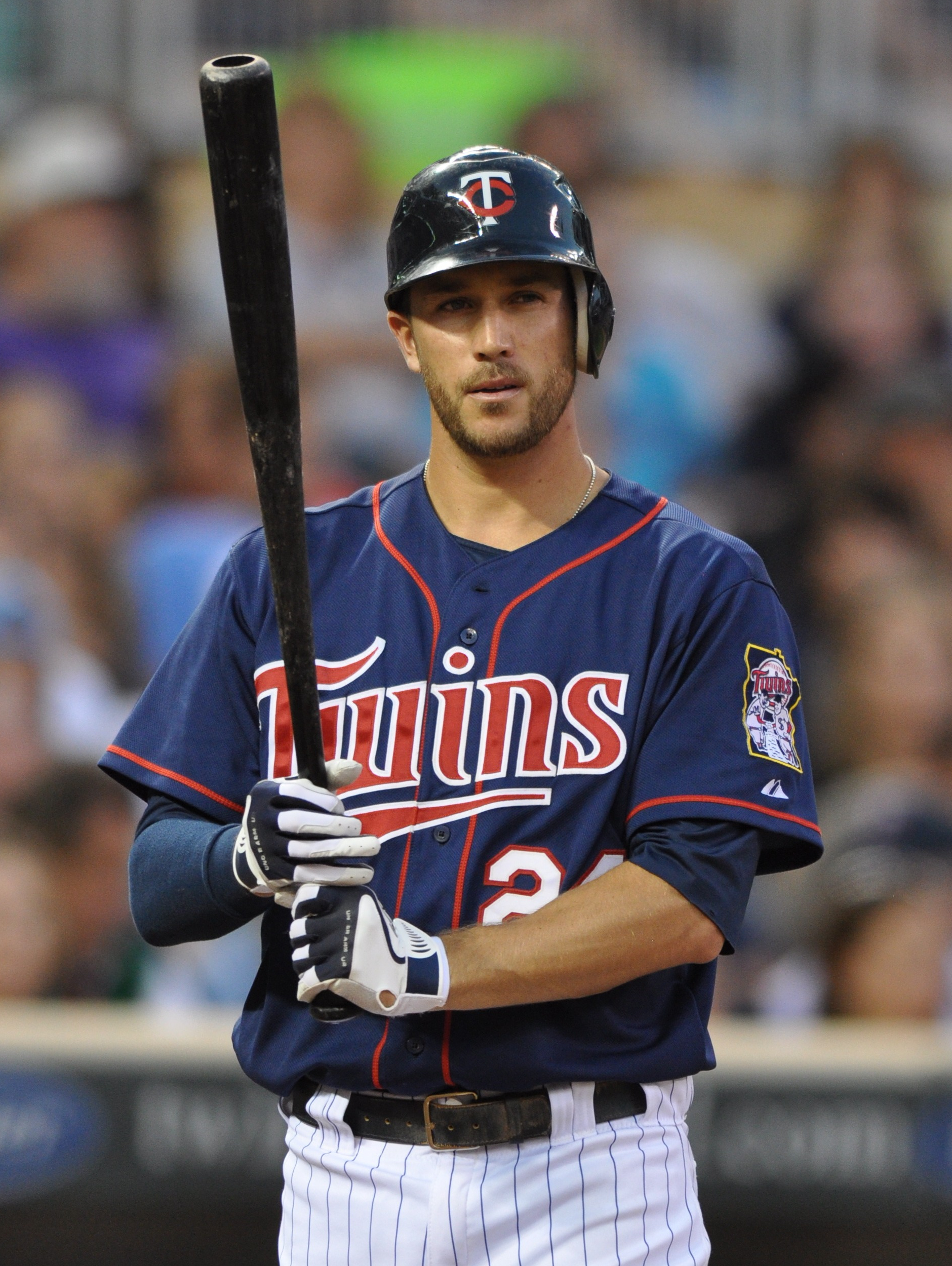
- Plouffe with the Minnesota Twins
- Third baseman
- Born: June 15, 1986 (age 40); West Hills, California, U.S.
- Batted: Right Threw: Right

MLB debut
- May 21, 2010, for the Minnesota Twins

Last MLB appearance
- July 26, 2018, for the Philadelphia Phillies

MLB statistics
- Batting average: .242
- Home runs: 106
- Runs batted in: 379
- Stats at Baseball Reference

Teams
- Minnesota Twins (2010–2016); Oakland Athletics (2017); Tampa Bay Rays (2017); Philadelphia Phillies (2018)
Medals
Men's baseball
Representing United States
Baseball World Cup
Gold medal – first place	2009 Nettuno	National team

Trevor Patrick Plouffe (/pluːf/ PLOOF; born June 15, 1986) is an American media personality and former professional baseball third baseman. He previously played in Major League Baseball (MLB) for the Minnesota Twins, Oakland Athletics, Tampa Bay Rays, and Philadelphia Phillies. Plouffe was drafted by the Twins out of high school as a shortstop with the 20th overall pick in the 2004 Major League Baseball draft. After beginning his MLB career as a shortstop for the Twins in 2010, Plouffe has appeared at every position except for pitcher, catcher, and center fielder.

== Amateur career ==
Born in Los Angeles, Plouffe attended Crespi Carmelite High School in Encino, the alma mater of former major leaguers Jeff Suppan and Rick Dempsey. As a star shortstop and right-handed pitcher, Plouffe led Crespi to their first section baseball championship in 2003 as a junior and also held a 3.85 GPA. In 2003 he was 12-1 with an 0.71 ERA, and batted .500 with six home runs and 47 RBIs. In 2004 he was 12-2 with an 0.86 earned-run average as a pitcher, and batted .481 with a .633 OBP, six home runs, and 29 runs batted in. At Crespi High, Plouffe was named a 2004 Collegiate Baseball News High School All-American as a senior.

== Professional career ==
=== Minor leagues ===
Plouffe was drafted by the Minnesota Twins out of high school as a shortstop with the 20th overall pick in the 2004 Major League Baseball draft, and turned down a scholarship to Stanford University to play baseball. After signing for $1.5 million, Plouffe spent the 2004 season with the Rookie-level Elizabethton Twins. He batted .283/.340/.380 and was named the league's sixth-best prospect by Baseball America.

Plouffe spent 2005 with the Class A Midwest League's Beloit Snappers, where he batted .223/.300/.345 and was again recognized as one of the league's top prospects, this time ranking 12th overall.

In 2006, Plouffe played for the Class A-Advanced Fort Myers Miracle of the Florida State League, batting .246/.333/.347. During the season, he played third base in 25 games, the first time he had played a position other than shortstop as a professional.

In 2007, Plouffe was promoted to the Double-A New Britain Rock Cats. He was chosen as the Twins' Minor League Player of the Week (April 27 – May 3), Eastern League Player of the Week (May 28 – June 3) and an Arizona Fall League Rising Star. In the Eastern League he batted .274/.326/.410, and was third in doubles (37).

Plouffe split the 2008 season between the Rock Cats and Triple-A Rochester Red Wings, where he hit a combined .262/.308/.415 with nine home runs and 60 RBIs. With the Red Wings, he was used at second base as well as third base and shortstop. After the season, on November 20, Plouffe was added to the Twins' 40-man roster.

In 2009, Plouffe spent the entire year in Rochester. He also returned to playing shortstop full-time while batting .260/.313/.407 in 118 games.

=== Major leagues ===
==== Minnesota Twins ====
After starting the 2010 season with Rochester, he was called up to the Twins on May 20, replacing pitcher Jeff Manship on the 25-man roster. Plouffe started his first major league game for the Twins on May 21 against the Milwaukee Brewers, singling and driving in a run in his first big league at bat. Plouffe finished the season playing a total of 22 games while hitting just .146 in 41 at bats.

Plouffe returned to the Twins at the start of the 2011 season. After a fast start in which he batted .282 with 6 home runs in 21 games, Plouffe was called up on May 6. That day, he started at shortstop against the Boston Red Sox, and in his first at bat hit a home run over the Green Monster off of Tim Wakefield. In 81 games, Plouffe hit 8 home runs while hitting .238/.305/.392 for the Twins.

After starting the 2012 season poorly, Plouffe embarked on a power surge at mid-season, hitting 11 home runs in the month of June. He became the Twins' everyday third baseman after Danny Valencia was demoted to Triple-A Rochester in early May. Plouffe hit a career-high 24 home runs while batting .235/.301/.455 in 119 games. He led the AL in errors, with 19.

Plouffe was the starting third baseman for most of the 2013 season and played 129 games. He was somewhat inconsistent in both hitting and fielding despite hitting a career-high .254 for the Twins.

Plouffe established career highs in several offensive categories in 2014, as well as improving his defense tremendously. He hit .258/.328/423 with a career-high 40 doubles (4th in the AL), leading the team in both latter categories.

In 2015 he batted .244/.307/.435 with 22 home runs, and led the majors by grounding into 28 double plays. Plouffe had a career-high 74 runs and 86 RBIs.

In 2016 Plouffe batted .260/.303/.420 with 12 home runs and 47 RBIs. He was outrighted off the Twins roster after the 2016 season and became a free agent.

==== Oakland Athletics ====
On January 18, 2017, Plouffe signed a one-year contract with the Oakland Athletics. He was designated for assignment on June 15, 2017.

==== Tampa Bay Rays ====
On June 17, 2017, the Tampa Bay Rays acquired Plouffe for cash considerations. The team designated Plouffe for assignment on August 22. Between Oakland and Tampa Bay he batted .198/.272/.318.

==== Texas Rangers ====
On February 12, 2018, Plouffe signed a minor league contract with the Texas Rangers. He was released on March 23, and signed a new minor league contract with the Rangers on March 26. On April 10, Plouffe asked for and was granted his release from the Rangers organization.

==== Philadelphia Phillies ====
On April 23, 2018, Plouffe signed a minor league contract with the Philadelphia Phillies. He had his contract purchased by the Phillies on July 10. On July 24, Plouffe hit a walk-off home run off Los Angeles Dodgers' second baseman Enrique Hernández in the bottom of the 16th to give the Phillies a 7–4 win in a game that took just over 6 hours to complete (the game ended at around 1 am local time). It was the first walk-off home run to be hit off a position player in MLB history. Plouffe was designated for assignment on July 31, 2018, and sent outright to the Triple-A Lehigh Valley IronPigs on August 5. For the season with the Phillies, he was 3 for 12. Plouffe declared free agency on October 5, 2018. In the major leagues through 2018, he had played 611 games at third base, 55 games at shortstop, 47 games at first base, 27 games at second base, 27 games in right field, and 5 games in left field.

On February 20, 2019, Plouffe re-signed with the Phillies to a minor league deal. However, he was released prior to the start of the season on March 21, 2019.

=== Media career ===
In April 2020, following an investment in Jomboy Media, Plouffe joined the network as a co-host and analyst on the podcast/YouTube show "Talkin' Baseball", co-hosted by Jimmy "Jomboy" O'Brien and Jake Storiale. The trio discuss "everything in Major League Baseball and the wide world of baseball several times per week." He also launched a YouTube show as a part of the same network called "Sequence with Trevor Plouffe" where he "brings former teammates and guests from around baseball to break down past performances." Plouffe currently hosts a daily baseball show with former MLB Network personality Chris Rose called "Baseball Today" where the two break down the latest baseball news.

== Personal life ==
Plouffe and his wife Olivia were married at Pepperdine University's Stauffer Chapel. They have two children. As of 2026, he coaches his son's Little League team.

The Plouffes reside in Point Richmond, Richmond, California.
