= Joe Benson =

American baseball player (born 1988)

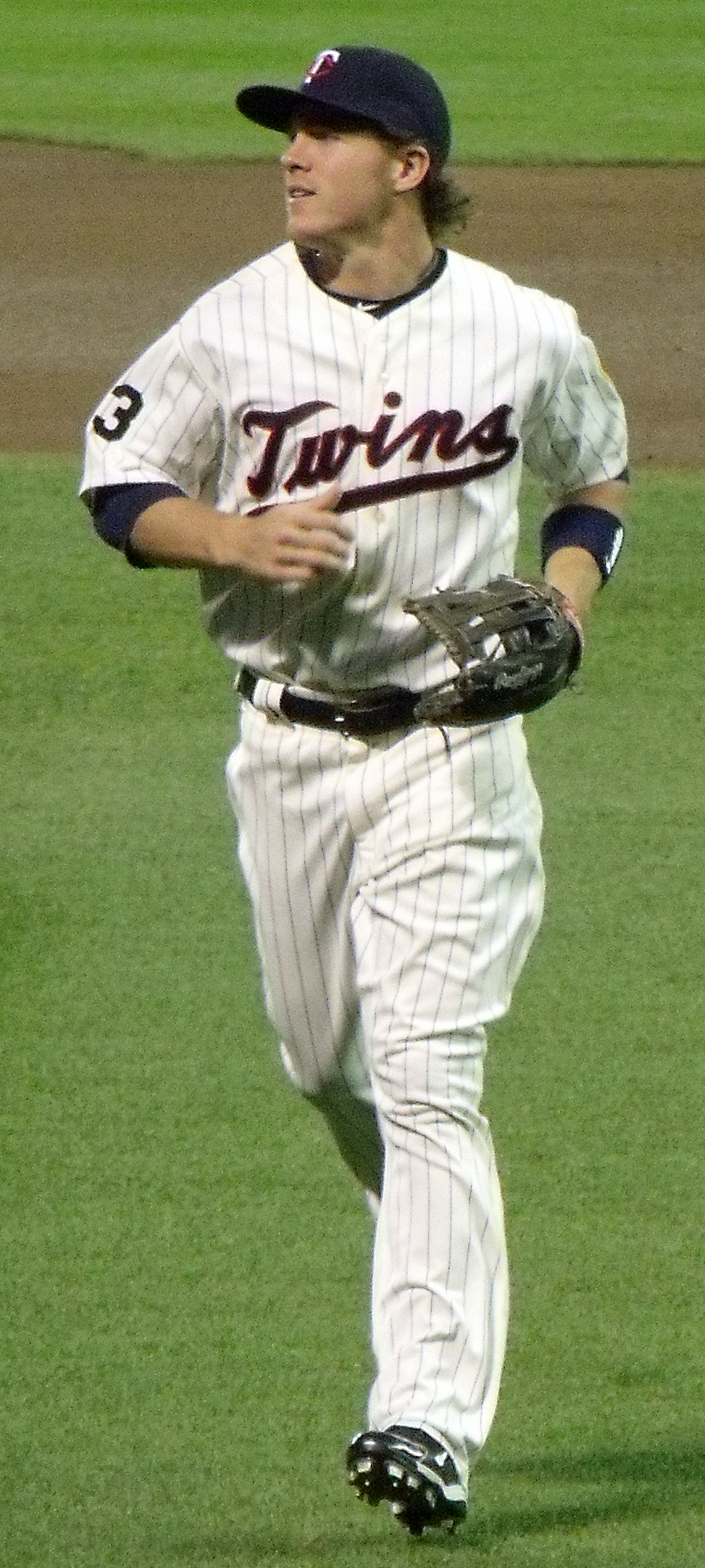
- Benson in 2011
- Outfielder
- Born: March 5, 1988 (age 37); Hinsdale, Illinois, U.S.
- Batted: Right Threw: Right

MLB debut
- September 4, 2011, for the Minnesota Twins

Last MLB appearance
- September 28, 2011, for the Minnesota Twins

MLB statistics
- Batting average: .239
- Home runs: 0
- Runs batted in: 2
- Stats at Baseball Reference

Teams
- Minnesota Twins (2011)

William Joseph Benson (born March 5, 1988) is an American former professional baseball outfielder. He played in Major League Baseball (MLB) for the Minnesota Twins during the 2011 season.

== College career ==
Benson attended Joliet Catholic Academy in Joliet, Illinois. Benson played baseball and American football at Joliet, and was recruited to play college football for the Purdue Boilermakers football team as a running back.

== Professional career ==
=== Minnesota Twins ===
The Minnesota Twins selected Benson in the second round of the 2006 Major League Baseball draft. Benson signed with the Twins rather than attend Purdue.

Benson participated in spring training for the Twins in 2011, but did not make the opening day roster and was subsequently assigned to the Double-A affiliate of the Twins, the New Britain Rock Cats, where he was given the starting job in center field. On September 6, 2011, Benson made his major league debut for the Minnesota Twins. He went without a hit a three at-bats, drawing a walk and striking out once. Benson's first major league hit was a single off of Detroit Tigers pitcher Max Scherzer on September 10, 2011.

In 2013, Benson competed with Aaron Hicks for the starting centerfield position with the Twins. Hicks won the job, and Benson went to the Rochester Red Wings of the Triple-A International League. In May 2013, the Twins put Benson on outright waivers to clear a roster spot for P. J. Walters.

=== Texas Rangers ===
On May 25, 2013, Benson was claimed off waivers by the Texas Rangers. On September 1, Benson was designated for assignment by Texas. He cleared waivers and was sent outright to the Triple-A Round Rock Express on September 3. Benson never appeared for Texas, playing in 44 games for the rookie-level Arizona League Rangers and Double-A Frisco RoughRiders. On November 4, Benson elected free agency.

=== Miami Marlins ===
On December 20, 2013, Benson signed a minor league contract with the Miami Marlins. He spent most of the season with Double–A Jacksonville Suns, also playing in three games for the Triple-A New Orleans Zephyrs. In 124 games for Jacksonville, Benson slashed .250/.355/.380 with four home runs, 24 RBI, and seven stolen bases.

=== Atlanta Braves ===
On January 7, 2015, Benson signed a minor league contract with the Atlanta Braves. In 41 games for the Triple-A Gwinnett Braves, he batted .246/.346/.331 with no home runs, nine RBI, and four stolen bases. Benson was released by the Braves organization on June 19.

=== Sugar Land Skeeters ===
On June 22, 2015, Benson signed with the Sugar Land Skeeters of the Atlantic League of Professional Baseball. In 5 games for Sugar Land, Benson went 4-for-20 (.200) with one RBI and one stolen base.

=== New York Mets ===
On July 11, 2015, Benson signed a minor league contract with the New York Mets organization. In 54 games for the Double-A Binghamton Mets, he batted .250/.355/.380 with four home runs, 24 RBI, and seven stolen bases. Benson elected free agency following the season on November 6.

=== Sugar Land Skeeters (second stint) ===
On November 30, 2015, Benson signed a minor league contract with the Minnesota Twins organization. He was released prior to the start of the season on March 30, 2016.

On April 17, 2017, Benson signed with the Sugar Land Skeeters of the Atlantic League of Professional Baseball. In 117 appearances for the Skeeters, he hit .254/.308/.371 with eight home runs, 40 RBI, and 17 stolen bases. Benson became a free agent following the season.

=== Chicago Dogs ===
On May 8, 2018, Benson signed with the Chicago Dogs of the American Association of Independent Professional Baseball. In 73 appearances for the Dogs, he batted .300/.375/.498 with nine home runs, 38 RBI, and nine stolen bases. Benson was released by Chicago on April 30, 2019.

=== Southern Maryland Blue Crabs ===
On June 4, 2019, Benson signed with the Southern Maryland Blue Crabs of the Atlantic League of Professional Baseball. In 96 games for the Blue Crabs, he slashed .219/.283/.316 with four home runs, 28 RBI, and 12 stolen bases. Benson became a free agent following the season.
