= Carlos Gutiérrez (baseball) =

American baseball player (born 1986)

Carlos Gutierrez
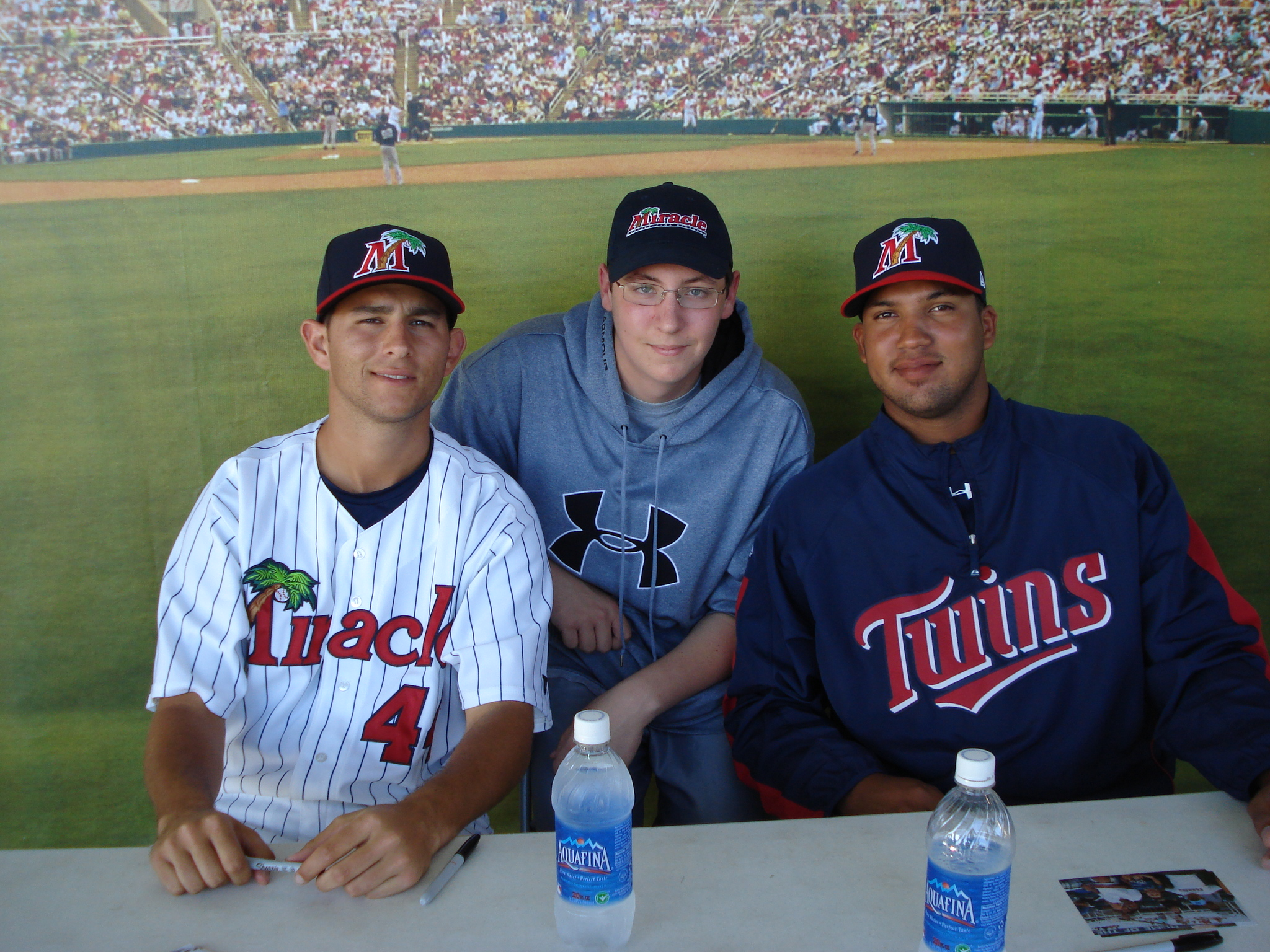
- Minnesota Twins pitching prospects Gutierrez & Deolis Guerra smile for a picture with an autograph seeking fan
- Pitcher
- Born: September 22, 1986 (age 39); Miami, Florida, U.S.
- Bats: Left Throws: Right
- Stats at Baseball Reference

Carlos Rafael Gutiérrez (born September 22, 1986) is a Puerto Rican-American former professional baseball relief pitcher. He last played in the Chicago Cubs organization in 2013.

== Career ==
=== Minnesota Twins ===
The 6'3" tall, 205 lbs. right-hander was selected by the Minnesota Twins in the first round (27th overall) of the 2008 Major League Baseball draft as a compensation pick from the Los Angeles Angels after signing Twins free agent Torii Hunter. He entered the 2010 season ranked as the Twins seventh best prospect by Baseball America.

Following the 2008 season, Gutiérrez pitched for Gigantes de Carolina of the Winter Liga de Beisbol Profesional de Puerto Rico, and with Puerto Rico in the 2009 World Baseball Classic. Gutierrez pitched one inning of Puerto Rico's 7-0 victory over Panama in round one of the World Baseball Classic.

Gutiérrez spent the first half of 2009 with the Fort Myers Miracle, where he went 2-3 with a 1.32 earned run average over ten starts (one relief appearance) to earn a Florida State League All star selection, however, he did not participate due to his recent promotion to the double A New Britain Rock Cats. He appeared in 32 games with New Britain with 122 innings pitched and went 5-8 with a 4.57 ERA before being promoted to Triple-A in September 2010.

Gutiérrez spent the entirety of the 2011 season with the Triple-A Rochester Red Wings. In 43 appearances out of the bullpen for Rochester, he compiled a 2-3 record and 4.62 ERA with 57 strikeouts across 62 1/3 innings pitched. On November 18, 2011, the Twins added Gutiérrez to their 40-man roster to protect him from the Rule 5 draft.

Gutiérrez made 10 appearances for Rochester in 2012, registering a 2-2 record and 5.06 ERA with 20 strikeouts over 16 innings of work. On July 19, 2012, it was announced that Gutiérrez would require season-ending arthroscopic surgery to repair damage to his shoulder.

=== Chicago Cubs ===
On October 24, 2012, Gutiérrez was claimed off waivers by the Chicago Cubs. On November 20, Gutiérrez was removed from the 40-man roster and sent outright to the Triple-A Iowa Cubs. He split the 2013 season between the rookie-level Arizona League Cubs, High-A Daytona Cubs, and Double-A Tennessee Smokies, accumulating an 0.77 ERA with six strikeouts and two saves across 11 2/3 innings pitched. Gutiérrez was released by the Cubs organization on March 18, 2014.
