= Rob Delaney (baseball) =

American baseball pitcher (born 1984)

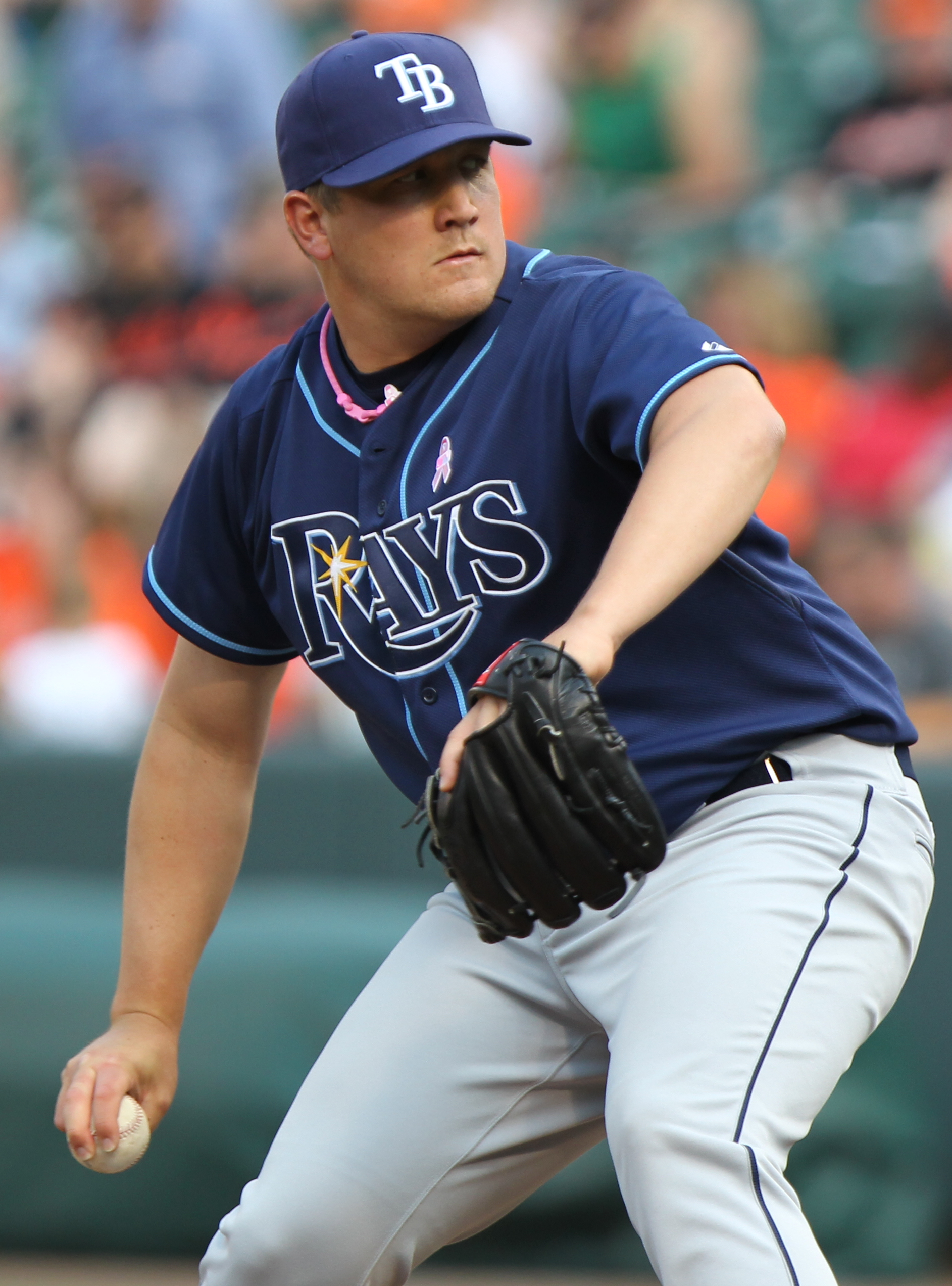
- Delaney with the Tampa Bay Rays
- Pitcher
- Born: September 8, 1984 (age 41); Westwood, New Jersey, U.S.
- Batted: Left Threw: Right

MLB debut
- September 4, 2010, for the Minnesota Twins

Last appearance
- July 27, 2011, for the Tampa Bay Rays

MLB statistics
- Games: 5
- Win–loss record: 0–0
- Earned run average: 10.50
- Stats at Baseball Reference

Teams
- Minnesota Twins (2010); Tampa Bay Rays (2011)

Robert James Delaney (born September 8, 1984) is an American college baseball coach and former professional pitcher. Delaney played college baseball at St. John's University from 2004 to 2006 for head coach Ed Blankmeyer. He played for the Minnesota Twins and Tampa Bay Rays of Major League Baseball (MLB). He pitched right-handed, and batted left-handed.

== Career ==
=== Minnesota Twins ===
Delaney with a fan while playing for the Fort Myers Miracle in 2008

Born in Westwood, New Jersey, Delaney attended Pascack Valley High School. He signed with the Minnesota Twins as an undrafted free agent in June 2006.

He represented the Fort Myers Miracle in the 2008 Florida State League All-Star game after compiling a 1–2 record with a 1.42 earned run average and 13 saves closing for the Miracle in the first half of the 2008 season. Delaney was promoted to the Twins' Double A affiliate, the New Britain Rock Cats following the All-Star game. With the Rock Cats, his record improved to 2–1, and his ERA lowered to 1.05 while pitching more innings (34.1 versus 31.2 in the first half of the season).

Following the season, Delaney competed in the Arizona Fall League with the Phoenix Desert Dogs. In the AFL, Delaney was 1–1 with a 4.22 ERA, and was the winning pitcher in Phoenix's 10–4 victory over the Mesa Solar Sox at Scottsdale Stadium that captured their fifth straight AFL championship.

On February 15, 2009, he reported to spring training with the Twins as a non-roster invitee, and following spring training, was reassigned to New Britain. He compiled a 1–1 record with a 2.00 ERA and 40 strikeouts in 36 innings over 26 games for New Britain when he was promoted to the Triple A Rochester Red Wings. With Rochester, he was 7–3 with a 4.53 ERA and seven saves. On November 20, 2009, he was added to the Twins' 40-man roster. He made his debut with the Twins on September 4, 2010, surrendering a solo home run to the first batter he faced, Ian Kinsler, in a 12–4 win.

=== Tampa Bay Rays ===
In January 2011, Delaney was claimed off waivers by the Tampa Bay Rays. He was designated for assignment on May 25, 2011. He had his contract purchased on July 27. With the Rays, he appeared in four games, surrendering six earned runs in five innings of work.

=== Miami Marlins ===
Delaney signed a minor league contract with the Miami Marlins on January 4, 2012. He went 3–1 with a 2.29 ERA in 44 relief appearances for the New Orleans Zephyrs of the Pacific Coast League.

=== Baltimore Orioles and Los Angeles Angels of Anaheim ===
Delaney signed a minor league contract with the Baltimore Orioles on January 30, 2013. Toward the end of Spring training, he was traded to the Angels for catcher Chris Snyder. He was 1–0 with a 5.14 ERA for the Salt Lake Bees of the Pacific Coast League.

== Coaching career ==
Failing to secure a position with a major league team for the 2014 season, Delaney accepted a job as pitching coach of the Sag Harbor Whalers.

In the winter of 2016, Delaney joined the Stevens Institute of Technology as the school's pitching coach and recruiting coordinator. Delaney was the pitching coach for the Villanova Wildcats baseball team for the 2018 and 2019 baseball seasons.
