= Jeff Manship =

American baseball player (born 1985)

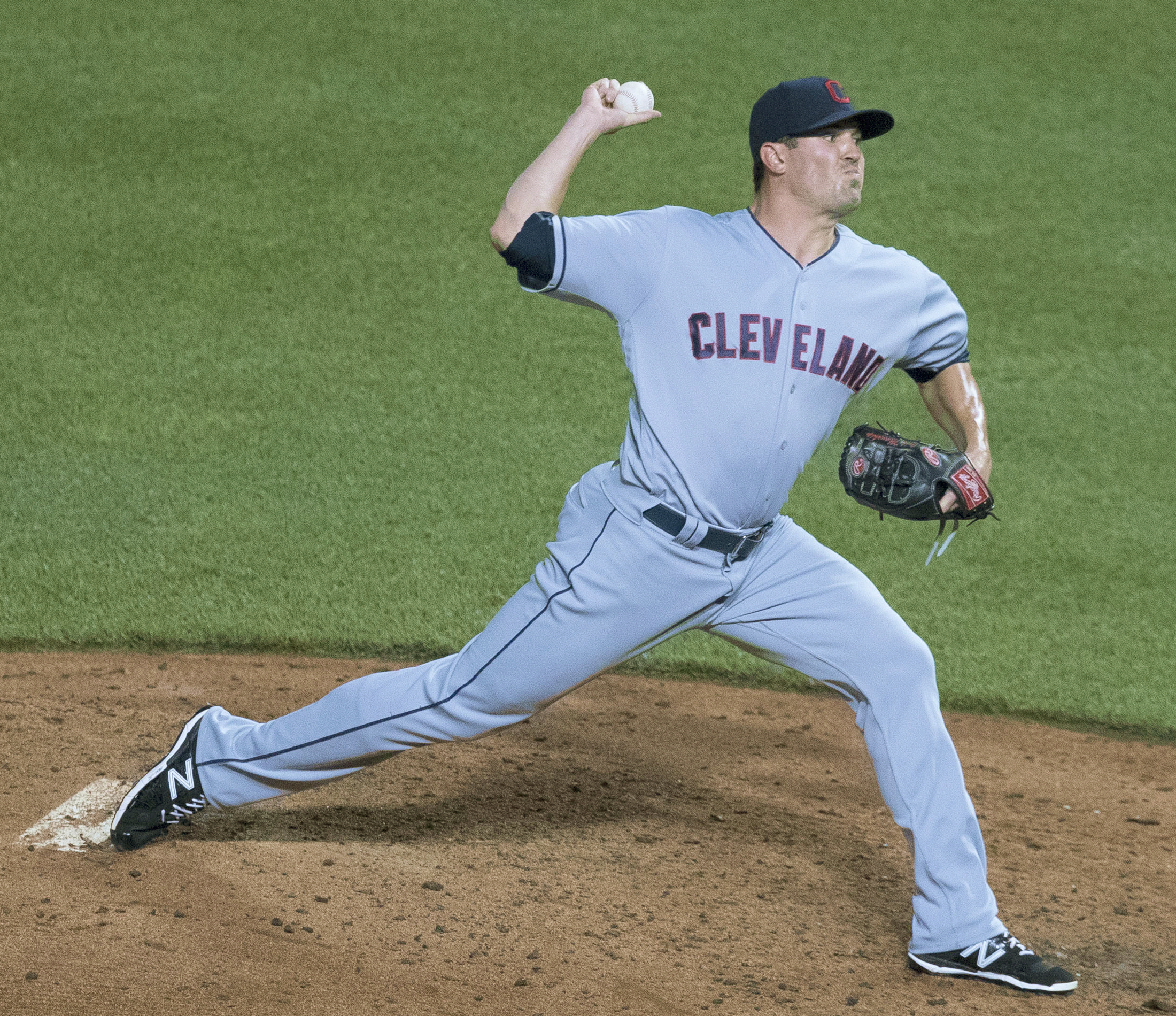
- Manship with the Cleveland Indians in 2016
- Pitcher
- Born: January 16, 1985 (age 41); San Antonio, Texas, U.S.
- Batted: Right Threw: Right

Professional debut
- MLB: August 15, 2009, for the Minnesota Twins
- KBO: March 31, 2017, for the NC Dinos

Last appearance
- MLB: October 1, 2016, for the Cleveland Indians
- KBO: September 29, 2017, for the NC Dinos

MLB statistics
- Win–loss record: 7–10
- Earned run average: 4.82
- Strikeouts: 159

KBO statistics
- Win–loss record: 12-4
- Earned run average: 3.67
- Strikeouts: 86
- Stats at Baseball Reference

Teams
- Minnesota Twins (2009–2012); Colorado Rockies (2013); Philadelphia Phillies (2014); Cleveland Indians (2015–2016); NC Dinos (2017)

Jeffrey Michael Manship (born January 16, 1985) is an American former professional baseball pitcher. He played in Major League Baseball (MLB) for the Minnesota Twins, Colorado Rockies, Philadelphia Phillies, and Cleveland Indians, and in the KBO League for the NC Dinos.

== Career ==
=== Amateur ===
Manship was a member of Team USA's 16-under and 18-under Youth and Junior National Teams, winning a gold medal in 2001. At Ronald Reagan High School in San Antonio, he was an All-American with a 22–2 record and 0.65 earned run average his final two seasons (2002 and 2003) with four no-hitters (one perfect game), and a 7.9 strikeout-to-walk ratio. He was drafted by the Arizona Diamondbacks out of high school, but chose instead to attend Notre Dame. He missed his entire freshman season at Notre Dame following reconstructive elbow surgery on February 11, 2004. In 2005, he played collegiate summer baseball with the Cotuit Kettleers of the Cape Cod Baseball League. He was selected by the Twins in the 14th round of the 2006 MLB draft.

=== Minnesota Twins ===
==== 2006–2008 ====
In Manship's first season of professional ball (2006), his combined effort for the Gulf Coast League Twins and Fort Myers Miracle was 22 strikeouts in 15 innings pitched with only two earned runs for a 1.20 ERA. He began the 2007 season with the Beloit Snappers of the Midwest League, going 7–1 with a 1.51 ERA to earn a Midwest League All-Star nod, and a promotion back up to Minnesota's High-A affiliate, the Fort Myers Miracle.

Manship was again a member of the Miracle's roster for the start of the 2008 season. After going 7–3 with a 2.86 ERA and 63 strikeouts to help the Miracle capture the Florida State League's first-half West Division title, he was again named to his league's All-Star team. Following the game, Manship was promoted to the Twins' double A Eastern League affiliate, the New Britain Rock Cats. With the Rock Cats, Manship's record fell to 3–6 with a 4.46 ERA.

==== 2009 ====
Manship began the 2009 season at New Britain, going 6–4, with a 4.28 ERA and 45 strikeouts in 13 starts, before being promoted to the triple A Rochester Red Wings on June 24. At Rochester, he went 4–2 with a 3.22 ERA and 30 strikeouts in eight starts. On August 12, 2009, Manship had his contract purchased by the Twins when left-handed pitcher Glen Perkins was placed on the disabled list with a shoulder strain. Manship was used in relief despite not having done so since college. He finished the season appearing in 11 games, 5 of them starts. He did not make the Twins 2009 playoff roster.

==== 2010 ====
Manship began the 2010 season with the Rochester Red Wings, posing a 2–2 record with a 3.48 ERA and 13 strikeouts in four April starts. He was called up to pitch for the Twins on May 1, starting in place of the unavailable Nick Blackburn, who was not with the team for family reasons. Manship did not figure in the decision, giving up two earned runs and striking out six in a 5–4 loss to the Cleveland Indians. Manship was optioned back to Rochester on May 4, to make room for the return of Blackburn. Manship played the majority of the season in Triple-A, appearing in only 13 games for the Twins.

==== 2011 ====
After starting the 2011 season with the Twins, Manship was optioned to Triple-A Rochester on April 17 and was never called back up to the majors.

==== 2012 ====
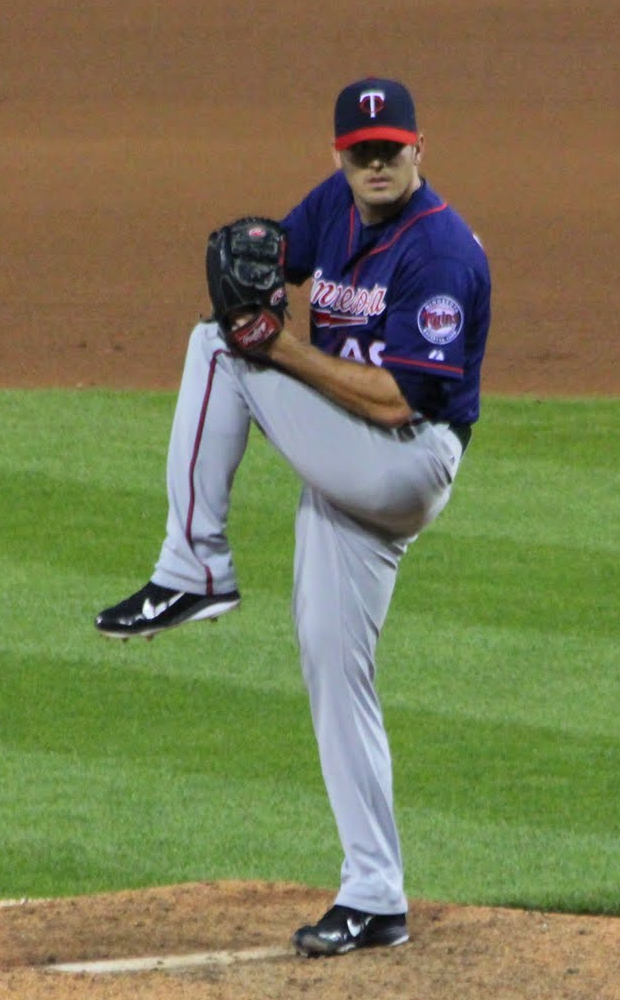
Manship pitching for the Minnesota Twins in 2012

Manship began the 2012 season with Rochester, going 4–1 with a 3.08 ERA in 12 games before being recalled to help with the bullpen on May 27, then finished the season strong back with Rochester after a rough time with the major league team. On October 24, 2012, the Twins announced that Manship had been removed from the team's 40 man roster.

=== Colorado Rockies ===
On November 23, 2012, just a month after being cut by Minnesota, Manship was signed to a minor league contract by the Colorado Rockies. He was promoted to make his Rockies debut on August 8 against the New York Mets, and tossed five innings in a losing effort. In 11 games (4 starts) for Colorado, Manship struggled to an 0-5 record and 7.04 ERA with 18 strikeouts across 30 2/3 innings pitched. On October 16, he was removed from the 40-man roster and sent outright to the Triple-A Colorado Springs Sky Sox. However, Manship rejected the assignment and elected free agency the next day.

=== Philadelphia Phillies ===
On December 5, 2013, Manship signed a minor league contract with the Philadelphia Phillies that included an invitation to spring training. He made the club's 2014 Opening Day roster after a strong spring training showing. Manship was designated for assignment on July 23, 2014. He elected free agency on October 1.

=== Cleveland Indians ===
On December 24, 2014, Manship signed a minor league contract with the Cleveland Indians organization. On June 18, 2015, the Indians selected Manship's contract, adding him to their active roster. In 32 appearances out of the bullpen, he recorded an 0.92 ERA with 33 strikeouts across 39 1/3 innings pitched.

Manship made 53 appearances for the Indians during the 2016 season, registering a 2-1 record and 3.12 ERA with 36 strikeouts over 43 1/3 innings of work. On December 2, 2016, the Indians non-tendered Manship, making him a free agent.

=== NC Dinos ===
On January 21, 2017, Manship signed with the NC Dinos of the KBO League. In 21 starts for the Dinos, Manship posted a 12-4 record and 3.67 ERA with 86 strikeouts across 112 2/3 innings pitched.

=== Cincinnati Reds ===
On February 6, 2018, Manship signed a minor league contract with the Cincinnati Reds. The contract was voided on February 15, after Manship failed his physical.
