= 2011 Texas Rangers season =

Major League Baseball team season

2011 Texas Rangers
- American League Champion; American League West Division Champion
- League: American League
- Division: West
- Ballpark: Rangers Ballpark in Arlington
- City: Arlington, Texas
- Record: 96–66 (.593)
- Divisional place: 1st place
- Owners: Rangers Baseball Express (Chuck Greenberg until March 2011, Nolan Ryan, Ray Davis and Bob R. Simpson)
- General managers: Jon Daniels
- Managers: Ron Washington
- Television: Fox Sports Southwest; KTXA (Dave Barnett, Tom Grieve, John Rhadigan)
- Radio: ESPN Radio (103.3 FM) (English) (Eric Nadel, Steve Busby, Bryan Dolgin, Dave Barnett); ESPN Deportes (1540 AM) (Spanish) (Eleno Orlenas, Jerry Romo)

The Texas Rangers' 2011 season was the 51st season in the overall history of the franchise and the 40th since the team relocated to Arlington, Texas. At the season outset, the Rangers were the defending American League champion.

Despite playing during one of the hottest summers on record in Texas, the Rangers claimed their second consecutive American League West title (fifth overall) and set franchise records for wins (96 wins and a .593 winning percentage, one win better than the previous record set in 1999) and home attendance (2,946,949 fans at Rangers Ballpark in Arlington, breaking the old record set in 1997). Another year of improvement from the starting pitching and defense would give the Rangers the most shutouts in the American League, and they trailed the Philadelphia Phillies by only two for the Major League Baseball (MLB) lead. All five members of the opening day starting rotation would stay in the rotation for the entire year. C. J. Wilson tied for the league lead in starts with 34 while Derek Holland tied for second in shutouts with four, tied for first in the American League, and each pitcher would have at least 13 wins. The offense, always considered a strong point for the team, would also have another good year with three players getting 30+ home runs, and Ian Kinsler completing his second 30–30 season.

The Rangers won their second straight AL West title, and beat the Tampa Bay Rays in four games and the Detroit Tigers in six to advance to the World Series. They lost to the St. Louis Cardinals in seven games, their second straight defeat in the Fall Classic, becoming the first team to lose back-to-back World Series since the Atlanta Braves in 1991 and 1992. The World Series was notable for the Rangers being one strike away from winning the series twice in Game 6 with a two-run lead each time before ultimately losing to the Cardinals 10–9 in an 11-inning thriller. They would go on to lose Game 7 by a score of 6–2.

2011 would mark the Rangers' last appearance in either a World Series or ALCS until 2023, when they finally won their first championship in franchise history.

== Offseason ==
The biggest free agent pitcher of the 2011 market was Cliff Lee. According to major media markets, Lee's most likely destination for 2011 was a return to Texas, or signing with the New York Yankees. Bob Simpson, a lead investor of Rangers Baseball Express which owns the Rangers, told media "We're going to go after Cliff Lee – hard, and we have the financial firepower to do that." After an extended process which included a flight by principal owner Chuck Greenberg, team investor Ray Davis, and assistant GM Thad Levine to meet with Lee, his wife, and agent following the winter meeting, Lee signed a five-year deal with the Phillies to return to the team which traded him away at the start of the 2010 season.

On November 3, 2010, the Rangers declined to exercise their 2011 option on Vladimir Guerrero's contract. Guerrero was a type A free agent but the Rangers would not receive draft pick compensation for Guerrero after he signed with the Baltimore Orioles.

Scott Feldman underwent surgery to repair torn cartilage in his right knee. The rehab time for the surgery will prevent Feldman from returning to compete for a rotation spot for the start of the season. Feldman was the Texas Rangers' pitcher of the year in 2009 and opening day starter for 2010, but failed to repeat his success in 2010 after signing a three-year extension.

For the second year in a row, the Rangers needed to fill the position of hitting coach after Clint Hurdle took the manager position with the Pittsburgh Pirates. The Rangers signed Thad Bosley. Bosley was a member of the A's coaching staff during Washington's time with the A's, and was also teammates with first base coach Gary Pettis in the Rangers organization during his final playing year.

The Rangers signed two players in November: 34-year-old free agent Japanese pitcher Yoshinori Tateyama, a side-arm throwing relief pitcher, and catcher Yorvit Torrealba from the San Diego Padres. Torrealba was a type B free agent and did not cost the Rangers a draft pick for the signing. Bengie Molina, the Rangers' primary catcher in 2010, elected to retire.

On December 26, the Rangers and pitcher Brandon Webb agreed to terms for a one-year contract. Webb, who was recovering from shoulder surgery, had not pitched in the majors since opening day of 2009.

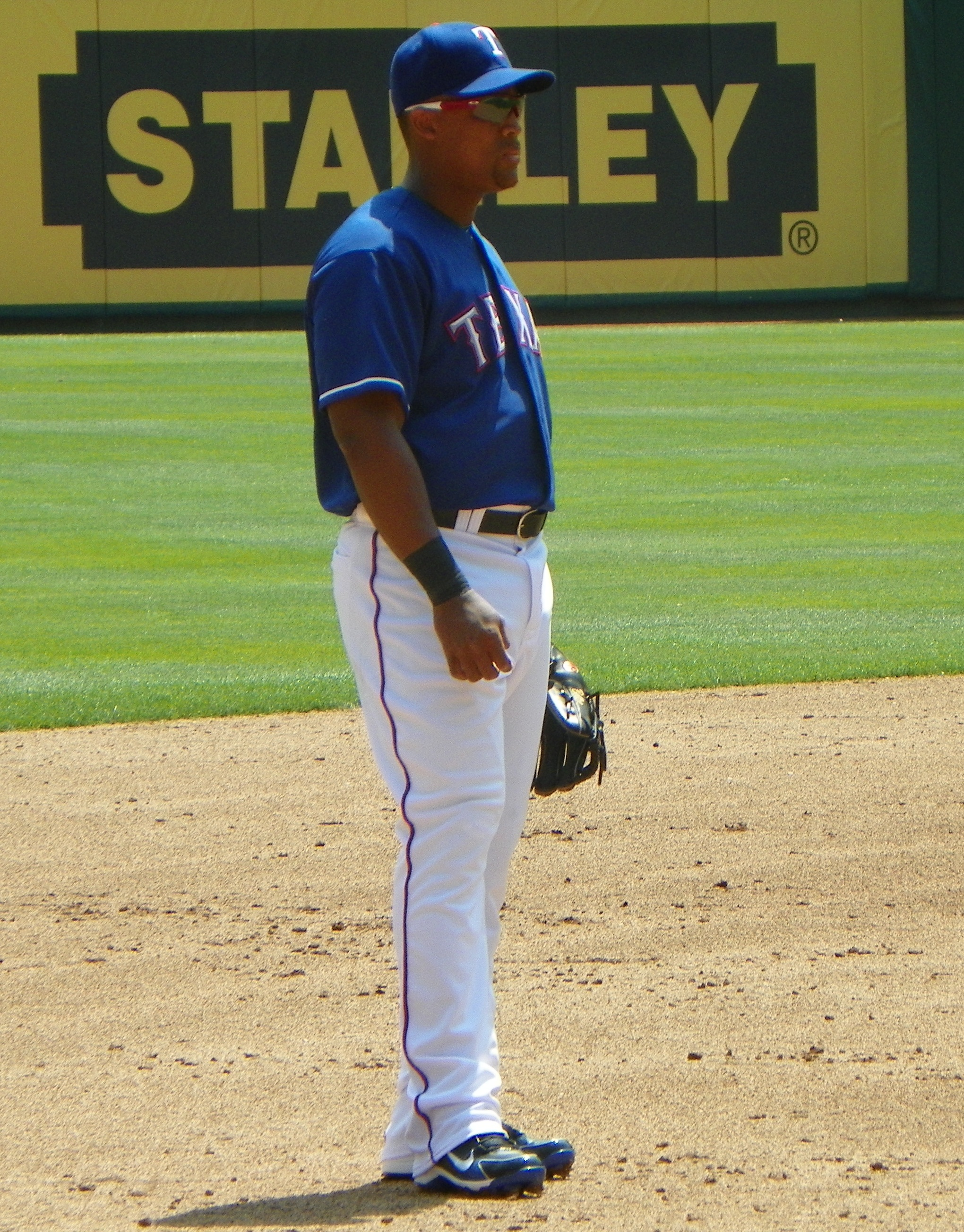
Gold glove third baseman Adrián Beltré

The Rangers' biggest free agent move for the 2011 season would be the signing of third baseman Adrián Beltré. The six-year, $96 million deal would force incumbent veteran Michael Young into his fourth position with the Rangers. Although Young was hesitant to make another position move, Young told the Rangers and the media he was willing to switch to designated hitter in order for the Rangers to sign Beltre. With the signing of Beltre and move of Young, the Rangers did not continue to attempt to re-sign Guerrero, who would sign a one-year deal with the Orioles.

In late January the Rangers made their biggest trade of the offseason when long-time trade target Mike Napoli was acquired from the Toronto Blue Jays for relief pitcher Frank Francisco. Napoli became available to the Rangers after being sent to the Blue Jays with Juan Rivera just three days earlier in exchange for Vernon Wells. The weakening of the bullpen from the loss of Francisco would not be the biggest problem from the Napoli trade as DH utility infielder Michael Young would demand his second trade request in three years. After a press conference in which Rangers president Nolan Ryan and GM Jon Daniels acknowledged Young's trade request, indicating Young had a change of heart after initially agreeing to be the primary designated hitter, Young fired back telling the press

The suggestion that I had a change of heart and asked for a trade is a manipulation of the truth. I asked for a trade because I've been misled and manipulated and I'm sick of it.

— Michael Young

Although trade rumors concerning Young would continue after his demand, as it did during and after the winter meetings, no trade would be forthcoming and Young reported for Spring training on time.

== Spring training ==
With an infield and outfield set, and multiple players able to cover in different positions, the rotation and bullpen would be the biggest questions for the front office to handle. C. J. Wilson was named the opening day starter early on, followed by Colby Lewis and Tommy Hunter. Free agent Brandon Webb would continue to prepare for a return to baseball, but would not be ready in time for opening day and would start the season on the disabled list. An injury to Hunter would place him on the disabled list to start the season, and Matt Harrison, who had earned the fourth spot, would be moved to third. The remaining candidates, Derek Holland, Michael Kirkman, Eric Hurley, and closer Neftalí Feliz, would continue to compete for the final two spots. Kirkman and Hurley were sent to AAA, and Feliz was returned to the closer role due to a weakened bullpen. Reliever Alexi Ogando would be the number 5 starter behind Holland to start the season.

On March 11, just 220 days after acquiring the team from auction, Chuck Greenberg would resign as CEO from the Rangers. The resignation came about due to different management styles between Greenberg and president Nolan Ryan. Ryan added the CEO title to his position.

I have great respect for the Texas Rangers franchise and am enormously proud of all we have accomplished together since August. Unfortunately, Nolan Ryan, the Co-Chairmen, and I have somewhat different styles. While I am disappointed we did not work through our differences, I remain wholeheartedly committed to doing what's right for the franchise. Together we concluded it is best for all concerned for me to sell my interest back to Rangers Baseball Express and move on. I do so with a heavy heart, but with every confidence in the direction that the new management team is taking the Rangers and, with Nolan at the helm, I know this franchise will continue to thrive and reach even greater heights both on and off the field.

— Chuck Greenberg, former CEO Texas Rangers

Although the rift between Greenberg and Ryan were never publicly discussed by the Rangers, reports indicated two major events that might have directly led to the removal of Greenberg, Greenberg's involvement with additional attempts to sign Cliff Lee, and his involvement with potential Young trades after Young demanded a trade, most specifically that Greenberg demanded Young forfeit deferred interest due to him by the Rangers. The demand would have been a violation of the MLB CBA.

During spring training GM Jon Daniels and Young met twice to discuss the situation leading to Young's trade demand. Daniels said it was the Rangers' continued trade discussions after Young being told he would not be traded once third baseman Adrián Beltré was acquired that helped lead to the trade demand.

The Rangers later traded Matt Treanor to the Kansas City Royals (Treanor would later be traded back to the Rangers at the end of August).

== Regular season ==
=== April ===
Record 16–11

Rotation: C. J. Wilson, Colby Lewis, Matt Harrison, Derek Holland, Alexi Ogando, Dave Bush

For the first time under manager Ron Washington the Rangers would finish the month of April with a record above .500. After sweeping the first two series against Boston and Seattle the Rangers would take their first loss of the season against Baltimore in the first game of a double header on April 9 after the series opener was rained out. The Rangers were the last team in the 2011 season to record a loss and each Ranger starter would get the win from game 2 through game 6, the first team to have 5 different starters win at least 1 game each. After the Baltimore series the Rangers would lose three straight series versus the Tigers, Yankees, and Angels. A sweep of the Royals, a 1–3 series loss to Toronto, and a two-game split with Oakland would finish out the month. The Rangers would spend only one day out of first place for the West in the month.

Ian Kinsler would make Major League history by being the first player to hit a lead off home run in the first two games of a season. Kinsler would also set another record along with Nelson Cruz by being the first teammates to hit at least one home run each in each of the first three games of the season. Cruz would go on to hit a home run in the first four games of the season, only the third player in Major League history, and the first to do so in the American League. Shortstop Elvis Andrus would also hit his first home run since 2009 in the fourth game of the season.

Ogando would make his second start against the Detroit Tigers and earn his second win. In each of his first two starts of the season he went 6+ innings, earned the win, and gave up 2 or fewer hit in each start, joining only 4 other pitchers since 1919 to do so. Ogando would be the first to do so without giving up a run.

On April 12 left fielder Josh Hamilton left the game after a first-inning play at the plate. The Rangers would ultimately lose their second game of the season and Hamilton would be diagnosed with a fracture in his right shoulder. After the game, Hamilton expressed his concern about the play before running calling it a "stupid play" and thinking "I don't want to do this... something is going to happen" but said he listened to his third base coach and ran on the infield foul out.

As a result of the rainout versus Baltimore on April 8, starter Colby Lewis pitched one day later than scheduled. This would force Lewis to miss his next start on April 13 against Detroit and resulted in Lewis missing a second start for the birth of his child. Local blogger and radio shock jock Richie Whitt would criticize the Rangers' and Lewis' decision to take a leave as a result of the birth of Lewis' second child. Whitt pointed out a starter only gets thirty or so chances to impact a baseball game, and since players are paid millions, the birth of a child should be planned for the off season if need be. Dallas Morning News reporter Evan Grant countered the blog posting stating it was the rain delayed Baltimore game which caused Lewis' next start to be a day later, resulting in Lewis missing his next start to attend the planned birth of his second child. Grant also reported Lewis offered to make a short rested start before the leave to avoid missing a start, and was declined by the Rangers to do so. Dave Bush would get the starts in Lewis' place. Bush would be the last player who started the season on a team's 25-man roster to make his 2011 debut. Left-handed pitcher Michael Kirkman would be called up during Lewis' leave.

On April 15 the Rangers and pitcher Matt Harrison would tie the MLB record by turning 6 double plays in the game. When Lewis returned on April 18, reliever Mark Lowe was optioned to AAA. Rule 5 draft pick Mason Tobin would leave the April 19 game with an injury and be placed on the 60-day DL the next day. Closer Neftalí Feliz would be sent to the 15-day disabled list with shoulder inflammation on April 23 and Darren O'Day would go on the 60-day DL with a torn labrum in his hip. Darren O'Day would also be placed on the 60-day DL on April 27 with a torn labrum in his left hip.

=== May ===
Record (month, year): 13–15, 29–26

Rotation: Matt Harrison, Derek Holland, Alexi Ogando, C. J. Wilson, Colby Lewis, Dave Bush

After losing their May 1 game, the Rangers were tied for first place with the Angels until falling to second place on May 5. The Rangers spent the next eleven days out of first place, falling as far as third in the division, but never fell below 2 games behind the Angels and retook the division lead on May 16. The Rangers would finish the month .5 game up on Seattle and 1 game up on the Angels.

After several weeks of speculation, the Rangers signed Cuban defect Leonys Martín on May 4 for a $15.5 million major league contract and added him to the 40-man roster. The Rangers also recalled Mark Lowe to the majors and option Pedro Strop to AAA.

Closer Neftalí Feliz returned from the DL on May 6. Nelson Cruz was placed on the 15-day DL with a strained right quadriceps muscle on May 7. Craig Gentry was called up to replace Cruz on the roster.

The May 11 day game between the Texas Rangers and Oakland A's was postponed due to rain in the middle of the fourth inning. After a 2-hour, 21-minute delay, the game was called. The Rangers held a commanding 7–0 lead in part due to a Mitch Moreland grand slam, but because the game was called before the end of the fifth inning, all results from the game were voided. Although both teams had the next day off, the game was not able to be made up the following day because the Rangers had played the previous 20 days in a row, and it is against MLBPA rules to play more than 20 days in a row. The game would instead be made up in on a fateful July 7 day.

Julio Borbon pulled a hamstring during the May 13 game and was placed on the 15-day DL. During this time, all three starting outfielders would be on the DL. Journeyman centerfielder Endy Chávez was called up to replace Borbon. To make room for the addition of Chávez on the 40 man roster, Brandon Webb was placed on the 60 man DL. Chávez had been with the Rangers organization on a minor league contract since 2010 while recovering from a torn ACL suffered during the 2009 season.

The Rangers took first place in the division back on Colby Lewis' first career shutout on May 16.

Josh Hamilton and Nelson Cruz returned to the team from the DL on May 23.

A second Rangers home game was delayed due to rain in May. The 7:00 May 24 game against the Chicago White Sox resulted in fans' evacuating the playing field and being placed in the underground entrances by ballpark officials with a "tornadic supercell" less than 10 miles from the ballpark. The teams played again at 1:00 CST the next day, but the umpiring crew concluded the game should be continued and play resumed after a three-hour delay.

Off the field, on May 26 the Rangers officially removed rookie play-by-play man John Rhadigan from the TV booth and sent him back to the Fox Sports Southwest post-game and pre-game show. Rhadigan had moved to the TV booth to replace long-time play-by-play game caller Josh Lewin, whose contract expired at the end of the 2010 season. Rhadigan had no play-by-play experience prior to the season, and was often lampooned by fans of the time on the Internet for his in-game mistakes and inability to correctly and timely describe the action on the field.

=== June ===
Record (month, year) 14–13, 43–39

Rotation: Alexi Ogando, Derek Holland, C. J. Wilson, Colby Lewis, Matt Harrison

The Rangers would hold onto first place for the entire month of June, but would lead the division by no more than 2.5 games during the month and ended with a 1-game lead over the Angels.

After completing his DL stint, centerfielder Julio Borbon was optioned to AAA on June 3. If Borbon had been returned to the ML roster, David Murphy, Endy Chávez, or Craig Gentry would have been removed from the 25 man roster. Although Murphy was having a bad offensive year coming into June, he still represented a better offensive potential than the remaining outfielders, and Gentry was the only right-handed outfielder other than Nelson Cruz. Chavez was out of options and in order to remain in the organization, would have had to have been placed on waivers and options to AAA.

Ian Kinsler went on paternity leave on June 8. The same day the Rangers also announced the dismissal of hitting coach Thad Bosley for communication differences. Beat writer Evan Grant reported after the dismissal one example taking place between Bosley and catcher Yorvit Torrealba.

[T]here had been some recent confrontations with players. Perhaps the most serious of those was an incident between Bosley and struggling catcher Yorvit Torrealba. According to multiple sources, Torrealba asked in Philadelphia if he could take some extra batting practice swings since pitcher Colby Lewis declined to participate in batting practice on the day he was pitching. It was, according to sources, agreed upon that Torrealba could hit in two different groups. But when he stepped in with the second group, sources said, Bosley told him he was not supposed to take the additional swings. Torrealba then left the field. An argument between the two ensued in the clubhouse.

— Evan Grant, June 9, 2011.

The Rangers replaced Bosley by promoting AAA hitting coach and former Ranger's player Scott Coolbaugh. Coolbaugh is the third hitting coach in two seasons following Rudy Jaramillo's 14 years as Texas' hitting coach.

Mike Napoli was placed on the 15-day DL on June 12 with a strained left oblique muscle.

Former reliever Alexi Ogando recorded a 7–0 record before losing his first decision to the New York Yankees on June 14. He would lose the next two decisions finishing June with a 7–3 record.

=== July ===
Record (month, year) 18–9, 61–48

After ending July 3 tied for first place with the Angels, the Rangers entered the all-star break on a 7-game winning streak. The streak would last another 5 games, the second best winning streak in franchise history. However, the Rangers would get no further than 5 games ahead of the Angels as a result of the streak. The Rangers ended the month 2 games in first place.

Ron Washington and first base coach Gary Pettis were both ejected from the July 3 game after a close call by first base umpire Ángel Hernández. Washington did not engage in the argument between Pettis and Hernández, but began yelling at the umpire after Hernández, according to Washington, "told me my job is to get him (Pettis) off the field. You don't tell me what my job is..... You can't talk to Angel. Angel is the smartest umpire in baseball." Washington was later fined for his comments.

The following day, Washington pinch hit Mike Napoli for designated hitter Michael Young in the 8 inning of a 13–4 win over the Orioles. At the time of his at bat, Young was a home run short of hitting for the cycle, and Washington later admitted his error by lifting Young for Napoli. It was the second time in Washington's tenure as Rangers' manager that he pinch hit for a batter who was one potential at bat away from completing the cycle.

Prior to the non-waiver trading deadline the Rangers picked up Koji Uehara from the Baltimore Orioles in exchange for Chris Davis and Mike Adams from the San Diego Padres. Arthur Rhodes was released.

==== Fan's death ====
Exactly one year and one day after firefighter Tyler Morris fell from the upper deck onto the lower infield seats, another fan fell from the stands. Shannon Stone, also a firefighter, was in attendance at the July 7 game against Oakland. After left fielder Josh Hamilton retrieved a foul ball, he tossed it into the left field seats toward Stone. Stone, who was in attendance with his son, attempted to catch the ball by leaning over the guardrail when he lost his balance and fell head first between the divider separating the left field wall and the stands. Although Stone was conscious when he left the ballpark, he died on the way to the hospital.

The Rangers started a Shannon Stone memorial fund for the family and planned to place a monument at the homeplate entrance of a father and son walking into the ballpark.

==== All-Star selections ====
- Michael Young DH
- Josh Hamilton LF
- C. J. Wilson P
- Alexi Ogando P
- Adrián Beltré 3B

Hamilton was the only Ranger selected by fan voting. Young and Beltre were each selected by player voting. Wilson was selected by Washington. This decision did create some criticizing from media and fans, especially those who wanted Yankees pitcher CC Sabathia selected. However, when Washington made the selection he also had the players voting results available to him, and know which pitchers would be selected if other starters were made unavailable due to starting prior to the All-Star game. After starting pitcher Justin Verlander was made unavailable due to his start, the next pitcher selected was Sabathia who also started. The final spot was then awarded to Ogando who had not lost a game when the player voting took place.

=== August ===
Record (month, year) 16–12, 77–60

Prior to the last day of the month the Rangers picked up Michael Gonzalez (also from the Orioles) who received Pedro Strop in exchange, and re-acquired Matt Treanor from the Kansas City Royals.

=== September ===
Record (month, year) 19–6, 96–66

On Friday, September 23, the Rangers (playing at home) defeated the Mariners by a score of 5–3 and moving the magic number to 1 game. Because the Angels had a scheduled start on the west coast, approximately 12,000 fans stayed inside Rangers Ballpark watching the outcome of that game on the scoreboard. Once the Angels were defeated by the Oakland A's by a score of 3–1, making the Rangers American League West champions for the second consecutive year, the Rangers returned to the field to celebrate in front of the fans. In a familiar scene, the Rangers celebrated using ginger ale on-field with Josh Hamilton, but later sprayed each other with champagne once inside the locker room.

By sweeping the Angels in the last away-game series, the Rangers also clinched home-field advantage in the first round of the playoffs with a record of 96–66, second in the American League only to the New York Yankees with a record of 97–65.

== Postseason ==
=== ALDS: Tampa Bay Rays vs. Texas Rangers ===
After losing the first game of a best-of-5 playoff series against Tampa Bay, the Rangers rebounded to win the next three games (including both games in Tampa Bay) to take the series 3–1. Colby Lewis' game 3 start was only the 17th game in postseason history to have a starter go at least 6 innings with 1 hit or less, and Lewis became the eighth pitcher to do so in a postseason game while recording 6 or more strikeouts. The Rangers clinched the ALDS in game four and became the third franchise to advance to the ALCS in consecutive years during the past decade. Matt Harrison lasted only 5 innings in game 4, but recorded 9 strikeouts in the outing. Harrison is the 10th player to throw 9 strikeouts or more in fewer than 6 innings in a postseason game. Adrián Beltré became the fifth player to hit 3 home runs in a playoff game, becoming the first to do so in a League Division Series game. The last time a player hit 3 home runs in a postseason game was 1978 by George Brett.

Texas won the series, 3-1.

Game	Date	Score	Location	Time	Attendance
1	September 30	Tampa Bay Rays – 9, Texas Rangers – 0	Rangers Ballpark in Arlington	3:00	50,498
2	October 1	Tampa Bay Rays – 6, Texas Rangers – 8	Rangers Ballpark in Arlington	3:28	51,351
3	October 3	Texas Rangers – 4, Tampa Bay Rays – 3	Tropicana Field	3:51	32,828
4	October 4	Texas Rangers – 4, Tampa Bay Rays – 3	Tropicana Field	3:05	28,299

=== ALCS: Detroit Tigers vs. Texas Rangers ===
Texas won the series, 4-2.

Game	Date	Score	Location	Time	Attendance
1	October 8	Detroit Tigers – 2, Texas Rangers – 3	Rangers Ballpark in Arlington	3:07 (a)	50,114
2	October 10 (b)	Detroit Tigers – 3, Texas Rangers – 7	Rangers Ballpark in Arlington	4:27 (c)	51,227
3	October 11	Texas Rangers – 2, Detroit Tigers – 5	Comerica Park	3:08	41,905
4	October 12	Texas Rangers – 7, Detroit Tigers – 3	Comerica Park	4:00 (d)	42,234
5	October 13	Texas Rangers – 5, Detroit Tigers – 7	Comerica Park	3:21	41,908
6	October 15	Detroit Tigers – 5, Texas Rangers – 15	Rangers Ballpark in Arlington	3:32	51,508

(a) Game 1 suffered 2 rain delays totaling 1:50

(b) Game 2 was rescheduled from 10/9 to 10/10 due to rain

(c) Game 2 was an 11th-inning walk-off

(d) Game 4 suffered a pre-game rain delay totaling 2:13 and was extended into 11 innings

=== World Series: St. Louis Cardinals vs. Texas Rangers ===
St. Louis won the series, 4–3.

Game	Date	Score	Location	Time	Attendance
1	October 19	Texas Rangers – 2, St. Louis Cardinals – 3	Busch Stadium	3:06	46,406 (49 °F (9 °C), clear; 20 mph (32 km/h) – Varies)
2	October 20	Texas Rangers – 2, St. Louis Cardinals – 1	Busch Stadium	3:04	47,288 (50 °F (10 °C), cloudy; 11 mph (18 km/h) – Out to RF)
3	October 22	St. Louis Cardinals – 16, Texas Rangers – 7	Rangers Ballpark in Arlington	4:04	51,462 (80 °F (27 °C), partly cloudy; no wind)
4	October 23	St. Louis Cardinals – 0,Texas Rangers – 4	Rangers Ballpark in Arlington	3:07	51,539 (68 °F (20 °C), clear; 1 mph (1.6 km/h) – varies)
5	October 24	St. Louis Cardinals – 2, Texas Rangers – 4	Rangers Ballpark in Arlington	3:31	51,459 (72 °F (22 °C), clear; 2 mph (3.2 km/h) – In from CF)
6	October 27	Texas Rangers – 9, St. Louis Cardinals – 10 (11 inn.)	Busch Stadium	4:33	47,325 (53 °F (12 °C), partly cloudy; 7 mph (11 km/h) – L to R)
7	October 28	Texas Rangers – 2, St. Louis Cardinals – 6	Busch Stadium	3:17	47,399 (50 °F (10 °C), clear; 6 mph (9.7 km/h) – R to L)

== MLB draft and international free agents ==
On November 11, 2010, the Rangers signed free agent draftee Barret Loux. Loux was the 6th pick in the 2010 MLB draft from Texas A&M, by the Arizona Diamondbacks, but Loux failed a physical from the Diamondbacks and a $2 million draft bonus was voided. MLB commissioner Bud Selig ruled the Diamondbacks would receive a compensation pick for the 2011 MLB draft and Loux would be a free agent. Including Loux, the Rangers signed 5 of the first 50 picks from the 2010 MLB draft.

The Rangers signed 18-year-old Dutch shortstop Nick Urbanus in November. In December the Rangers signed three additional free agents; sixteen-year-old short stop Rougned Odor from Venezuela, catcher Fernando Vivili from Dominican Republic, and pitcher Jose Leclair, also from the DR.

=== Roster ===
2011 Texas Rangers
Roster
Pitchers: 37 Mike Adams; 47 Dave Bush; 51 Cody Eppley; 39 Scott Feldman; 30 Neftalí Feliz; 51 Michael Gonzalez; 58 Mark Hamburger; 54 Matt Harrison; 45 Derek Holland; 35 Tommy Hunter; 44 Michael Kirkman; 48 Colby Lewis; 57 Mark Lowe; 56 Darren O'Day; 41 Alexi Ogando; 28 Darren Oliver; 53 Arthur Rhodes; 46 Pedro Strop; 22 Yoshinori Tateyama; 55 Mason Tobin; 21 Brett Tomko; 59 Ryan Tucker; 19 Koji Uehara; 55 Merkin Valdez; 36 C. J. Wilson	Catchers: 25 Mike Napoli; 2 Taylor Teagarden; 8 Yorvit Torrealba; 15 Matt Treanor; Infielders: 1 Elvis Andrus; 29 Adrián Beltré; 3 Andrés Blanco; 19 Chris Davis; 6 Esteban Germán; 5 Ian Kinsler; 18 Mitch Moreland; 12 Omar Quintanilla; 10 Michael Young; Outfielders: 20 Julio Borbon; 9 Endy Chávez; 17 Nelson Cruz; 23 Craig Gentry; 32 Josh Hamilton; 27 Leonys Martín; 7 David Murphy	Manager: 38 Ron Washington; Coaches: 16 Dave Anderson (third base); 27 Thad Bosley (hitting); 11 Scott Coolbaugh (hitting); 40 Andy Hawkins (bullpen); 31 Mike Maddux (pitching); 4 Jackie Moore (bench); 13 Johnny Narron (coach); 24 Gary Pettis (first base)

== Player stats ==
=== Batting ===
Note: G = Games played; AB = At bats; R = Runs; H = Hits; 2B = Doubles; 3B = Triples; HR = Home runs; RBI = Runs batted in; SB = Stolen bases; BB = Walks; AVG = Batting average; SLG = Slugging average

Player	G	AB	R	H	2B	3B	HR	RBI	SB	BB	AVG	SLG
Michael Young	159	631	88	213	41	6	11	106	6	47	.338	.474
Ian Kinsler	155	620	121	158	34	4	32	77	30	89	.255	.477
Elvis Andrus	150	587	96	164	27	3	5	60	37	56	.279	.361
Adrián Beltré	124	487	82	144	33	0	32	105	1	25	.296	.561
Josh Hamilton	121	487	80	145	31	5	25	94	8	39	.298	.536
Nelson Cruz	124	475	64	125	28	1	29	87	9	33	.263	.509
Mitch Moreland	134	464	60	120	22	1	16	51	2	39	.259	.414
David Murphy	120	404	46	111	14	2	11	46	11	33	.275	.401
Yorvit Torrealba	113	396	40	108	27	1	7	37	0	20	.273	.399
Mike Napoli	113	369	72	118	25	0	30	75	4	58	.320	.631
Endy Chávez	83	256	37	77	11	3	5	27	10	10	.301	.426
Craig Gentry	64	133	26	36	5	1	1	13	18	10	.271	.346
Julio Borbón	32	89	10	24	1	3	0	11	6	3	.270	.348
Andrés Blanco	36	76	9	17	3	0	2	3	0	4	.224	.342
Chris Davis	28	76	9	19	3	0	3	6	0	5	.250	.408
Taylor Teagarden	14	34	3	8	2	0	0	2	0	2	.235	.294
Omar Quintanilla	11	22	3	1	0	1	0	2	0	0	.045	.136
Esteban Germán	11	11	6	5	1	0	1	4	1	1	.455	.818
Matt Treanor	7	10	0	0	0	0	0	1	0	1	.000	.000
Leonys Martín	8	8	2	3	1	0	0	0	0	0	.375	.500
Pitcher totals	162	24	1	3	1	1	0	0	0	0	.125	.250
Team totals	162	5659	855	1599	310	32	210	807	143	475	.283	.460

=== Pitching ===
Note: W = Wins; L = Losses; ERA = Earned run average; G = Games pitched; GS = Games started; SV = Saves; IP = Innings pitched; H = Hits allowed; R = Runs allowed; ER = Earned runs allowed; BB = Walks allowed; SO = Strikeouts

Player	W	L	ERA	G	GS	SV	IP	H	R	ER	BB	SO
C.J. Wilson	16	7	2.94	34	34	0	223.1	191	89	73	74	206
Colby Lewis	14	10	4.40	32	32	0	200.1	187	103	98	56	169
Derek Holland	16	5	3.95	32	32	0	198.0	201	97	87	67	162
Matt Harrison	14	9	3.39	31	30	0	185.2	180	79	70	57	126
Alexi Ogando	13	8	3.51	31	29	0	169.0	149	73	66	43	126
Neftalí Feliz	2	3	2.74	64	0	32	62.1	42	22	19	30	54
Darren Oliver	5	5	2.29	61	0	2	51.0	47	17	13	11	44
Mark Lowe	2	3	3.80	52	0	1	45.0	46	26	19	19	42
Yoshinori Tateyama	2	0	4.50	39	0	1	44.0	37	23	22	11	43
Dave Bush	0	1	5.79	17	3	0	37.1	47	27	24	9	23
Scott Feldman	2	1	3.94	11	2	0	32.0	25	14	14	10	22
Michael Kirkman	1	1	6.59	15	0	0	27.1	26	22	20	12	21
Mike Adams	2	3	2.10	27	0	1	25.2	18	6	6	5	25
Arthur Rhodes	3	3	4.81	32	0	1	24.1	28	13	13	8	15
Koji Uehara	1	2	4.00	22	0	0	18.0	13	8	8	1	23
Brett Tomko	0	1	4.58	8	0	0	17.2	15	9	9	10	14
Darren O'Day	0	1	5.40	16	0	0	16.2	17	10	10	5	18
Tommy Hunter	1	1	2.93	8	0	0	15.1	12	6	5	5	10
Pedro Strop	0	1	3.72	11	0	0	9.2	7	4	4	7	9
Cody Eppley	1	1	8.00	10	0	0	9.0	11	8	8	5	6
Mark Hamburger	1	0	4.50	5	0	0	8.0	5	4	4	3	6
Mike Gonzalez	0	0	5.14	7	0	0	7.0	5	4	4	3	5
Mason Tobin	0	0	6.75	4	0	0	5.1	5	5	4	5	0
Ryan Tucker	0	0	7.20	5	0	0	5.0	6	5	4	4	4
Merkin Valdéz	0	0	6.23	5	0	0	4.1	7	3	3	1	6
Team totals	96	66	3.79	162	162	38	1441.1	1327	677	607	461	1179

== Season standings ==
=== American League West ===
AL West
Team	W	L	Pct.	GB	Home	Road
Texas Rangers	96	66	.593	—	52‍–‍29	44‍–‍37
Los Angeles Angels	86	76	.531	10	45‍–‍36	41‍–‍40
Oakland Athletics	74	88	.457	22	43‍–‍38	31‍–‍50
Seattle Mariners	67	95	.414	29	39‍–‍45	28‍–‍50

=== American League Wild Card ===
Division winners
Team	W	L	Pct.
New York Yankees	97	65	.599
Texas Rangers	96	66	.593
Detroit Tigers	95	67	.586

Wild Card team (Top team qualifies for postseason)
Team	W	L	Pct.	GB
Tampa Bay Rays	91	71	.562	—
Boston Red Sox	90	72	.556	1
Los Angeles Angels	86	76	.531	5
Toronto Blue Jays	81	81	.500	10
Cleveland Indians	80	82	.494	11
Chicago White Sox	79	83	.488	12
Oakland Athletics	74	88	.457	17
Kansas City Royals	71	91	.438	20
Baltimore Orioles	69	93	.426	22
Seattle Mariners	67	95	.414	24
Minnesota Twins	63	99	.389	28

=== Record vs. opponents ===
2011 American League record Source: MLB Standings Grid – 2011
Team	BAL	BOS	CWS	CLE	DET	KC	LAA	MIN	NYY	OAK	SEA	TB	TEX	TOR	NL
Baltimore	–	8–10	4–4	2–5	5–5	5–4	3–6	6–2	5–13	4–5	4–2	9–9	1–5	6–12	7–11
Boston	10–8	–	2–4	4–6	5–1	5–3	6–2	5–2	12–6	6–2	5–4	6–12	4–6	10–8	10–8
Chicago	4–4	4–2	–	11–7	5–13	7–11	2–6	9–9	2–6	6–4	7–2	4–4	4–4	3–4	11–7
Cleveland	5–2	6–4	7–11	–	6–12	12–6	3–6	11–7	3–4	5–2	5–4	2–4	1–9	3–4	11–7
Detroit	5–5	1–5	13–5	12–6	–	11–7	3–4	14–4	4–3	5–5	4–6	6–1	6–3	4–2	7–11
Kansas City	4–5	3–5	11–7	6–12	7–11	–	7–3	8–10	3–3	4–5	5–3	2–5	2–6	4–3	5–13
Los Angeles	6–3	2–6	6–2	6–3	4–3	3–7	–	6–3	4–5	8–11	12–7	4–4	7–12	5–5	13–5
Minnesota	2–6	2–5	9–9	7–11	4–14	10–8	3–6	–	2–6	4–4	3–5	3–7	5–3	1–5	8–10
New York	13–5	6–12	6–2	4–3	3–4	3–3	5–4	6–2	–	6–3	5–4	9–9	7–2	11–7	13–5
Oakland	5–4	2–6	4–6	2–5	5–5	5–4	11–8	4–4	3–6	–	9–10	5–2	6–13	5–5	8–10
Seattle	2–4	4–5	2–7	4–5	6–4	3–5	7–12	5–3	4–5	10–9	–	4–6	4–15	3–6	9–9
Tampa Bay	9–9	12–6	4–4	4–2	1–6	5–2	4–4	7–3	9–9	2–5	6–4	–	4–5	12–6	12–6
Texas	5–1	6–4	4–4	9–1	3–6	6–2	12–7	3–5	2–7	13–6	15–4	5–4	–	4–6	9–9
Toronto	12–6	8–10	4–3	4–3	2–4	3–4	5–5	5–1	7–11	5–5	6–3	6–12	6–4	–	8–10

- Source: MLB Standings Grid – 2011

=== Game log ===
Legend
Rangers Win	Rangers Loss	Game postponed

2011 Game Log (96-66)
April (16–11)

#	Date	Opponent	Score	Win	Loss	Save	Attendance	Record	Box
1	April 1	Red Sox	9–5	Darren Oliver (1–0)	Daniel Bard (0–1)		50,146	1–0	
2	April 2	Red Sox	12–5	Colby Lewis (1–0)	John Lackey (0–1)		48,356	2–0	
3	April 3	Red Sox	5–1	Matt Harrison (1–0)	Clay Buchholz (0–1)		46,326	3–0	
4	April 4	Mariners	6–4	Derek Holland (1–0)	Érik Bédard (0–1)	Neftalí Feliz (1)	37,618	4–0	
5	April 5	Mariners	3–2	Alexi Ogando (1–0)	Michael Pineda (0–1)	Neftalí Feliz (2)	30,953	5–0	
6	April 6	Mariners	7–3	C. J. Wilson (1–0)	Félix Hernández (1–1)		25,049	6–0	
	April 8	@ Orioles	Postponed (rain); Makeup: April 9 as part of a doubleheader						
7	April 9 (Game 1)	@ Orioles	0–5	Zach Britton (2–0)	Colby Lewis (1–1)		36,243	6–1	
8	April 9 (Game 2)	@ Orioles	13–1	Matt Harrison (2–0)	Jake Arrieta (1–1)		36,243	7–1	
9	April 10	@ Orioles	3–0	Derek Holland (2–0)	Jeremy Guthrie (1–1)	Neftalí Feliz (3)	21,452	8–1	
10	April 11	@ Tigers	2–0	Alexi Ogando (2–0)	Justin Verlander (1–1)	Neftalí Feliz (4)	18,724	9–1	
11	April 12	@ Tigers	4–5	José Valverde (1–0)	Darren O'Day (0–1)		20,609	9–2	
12	April 13	@ Tigers	2–3	José Valverde (2–0)	Darren Oliver (1–1)		20,526	9–3	
13	April 15	@ Yankees	5–3	Matt Harrison (3–0)	Iván Nova (1–1)	Neftalí Feliz (5)	40,814	10–3	
14	April 16	@ Yankees	2–5	Freddy García (1–0)	Derek Holland (2–1)	Mariano Rivera (6)	41,876	10–4	
15	April 17	@ Yankees	5–6	Rafael Soriano (1–0)	Arthur Rhodes (0–1)	Mariano Rivera (7)	40,811	10–5	
16	April 18	Angels	7–1	C. J. Wilson (2–0)	Ervin Santana (0–2)		30,799	11–5	
17	April 19	Angels	4–15	Matt Palmer (1–0)	Colby Lewis (1–2)		22,450	11–6	
18	April 20	Angels	1–4	Jered Weaver (5–0)	Matt Harrison (3–1)		31,967	11–7	
19	April 22	Royals	11–6	Derek Holland (3–1)	Jeff Francis (0–2)		45,769	12–7	
20	April 23	Royals	3–1	Alexi Ogando (3–0)	Kyle Davies (1–2)	Darren Oliver (1)	45,506	13–7	
21	April 24	Royals	8–7	C. J. Wilson (3–0)	Bruce Chen (3–1)	Arthur Rhodes (1)	28,284	14–7	
22	April 25	Blue Jays	4–6	Kyle Drabek (2–0)	Colby Lewis (1–3)	Jon Rauch (4)	22,915	14–8	
23	April 26	Blue Jays	3–10	Jesse Litsch (2–1)	Matt Harrison (3–2)		21,755	14–9	
24	April 27	Blue Jays	7–6	Cody Eppley (1–0)	Octavio Dotel (1–1)	Darren Oliver (2)	29,322	15–9	
25	April 28	Blue Jays	2–5	Frank Francisco (1–0)	Darren Oliver (1–2)		24,121	15–10	
26	April 29	@ Athletics	1–3	Trevor Cahill (4–0)	C. J. Wilson (3–1)	Brian Fuentes (7)	17,226	15–11	
27	April 30	@ Athletics	11–2	Colby Lewis (2–3)	Brett Anderson (2–2)		27,285	16–11	

May (13–15)

#	Date	Opponent	Score	Win	Loss	Save	Attendance	Record	Box
28	May 1	@ Athletics	2–7	Gio González (3–2)	Matt Harrison (3–3)		15,178	16–12	
29	May 2	@ Athletics	4–5 (10)	Grant Balfour (2–1)	Darren Oliver (1–3)		9,193	16–13	
30	May 3	@ Mariners	3–4	David Pauley (1–0)	Pedro Strop (0–1)	Brandon League (8)	12,759	16–14	
31	May 4	@ Mariners	5–2	C. J. Wilson (4–1)	Michael Pineda (4–2)		13,896	17–14	
32	May 5	@ Mariners	1–3	Jason Vargas (2–2)	Colby Lewis (2–4)	Brandon League (9)	14,205	17–15	
33	May 6	Yankees	1–4	Iván Nova (3–2)	Matt Harrison (3–4)	Mariano Rivera (12)	49,069	17–16	
34	May 7	Yankees	7–5	Arthur Rhodes (1–1)	Boone Logan (1–2)	Neftalí Feliz (6)	49,574	18–16	
35	May 8	Yankees	5–12	CC Sabathia (3–2)	Arthur Rhodes (1–2)		48,057	18–17	
36	May 9	Athletics	2–7	Trevor Cahill (6–0)	C. J. Wilson (4–2)		24,375	18–18	
37	May 10	Athletics	7–2	Colby Lewis (3–4)	Brett Anderson (2–3)		31,655	19–18	
	May 11	Athletics	Postponed (rain); Makeup: July 7						
38	May 13	Angels	4–1	Alexi Ogando (4–0)	Jered Weaver (6–3)	Neftalí Feliz (7)	45,995	20–18	
39	May 14	Angels	2–3	Scott Downs (1–0)	Darren Oliver (1–4)	Jordan Walden (7)	47,663	20–19	
40	May 15	Angels	5–4	Mark Lowe (1–0)	Rich Thompson (1–2)	Neftalí Feliz (8)	48,284	21–19	
41	May 16	@ White Sox	4–0	Colby Lewis (4–4)	Edwin Jackson (3–5)		23,048	22–19	
42	May 17	@ White Sox	3–4	Jesse Crain (1–1)	Cody Eppley (1–1)	Sergio Santos (6)	22,437	22–20	
43	May 18	@ Royals	5–4	Arthur Rhodes (2–2)	Jeremy Jeffress (1–1)	Mark Lowe (1)	13,789	23–20	
44	May 19	@ Royals	1–2 (10)	Greg Holland (1–0)	Darren Oliver (1–5)		12,355	23–21	
45	May 20	@ Phillies	2–3	Roy Halladay (6–3)	C. J. Wilson (4–3)	Ryan Madson (8)	45,358	23–22	
46	May 21	@ Phillies	0–2	Cliff Lee (3–4)	Colby Lewis (4–5)	Ryan Madson (9)	45,604	23–23	
47	May 22	@ Phillies	2–0	Matt Harrison (4–4)	Roy Oswalt (3–2)	Neftalí Feliz (9)	45,633	24–23	
48	May 23	White Sox	4–0	Alexi Ogando (5–0)	John Danks (0–7)		30,861	25–23	
49	May 24	White Sox	6–8	Tony Peña (1–1)	Brett Tomko (0–1)	Sergio Santos (7)	35,524	25–24	
50	May 25	White Sox	2–1	C. J. Wilson (5–3)	Gavin Floyd (5–4)	Neftalí Feliz (10)	32,382	26–24	
51	May 27	Royals	7–12 (14)	Blake Wood (2–0)	Dave Bush (0–1)		39,390	26–25	
52	May 28	Royals	10–1	Matt Harrison (5–4)	Sean O'Sullivan (2–4)	Yoshinori Tateyama (1)	40,240	27–25	
53	May 29	Royals	7–6	Arthur Rhodes (3–2)	Joakim Soria (3–2)		45,011	28–25	
54	May 30	@ Rays	11–5	Derek Holland (4–1)	Wade Davis (4–5)		14,203	29–25	
55	May 31	@ Rays	4–5	Joel Peralta (2–3)	Arthur Rhodes (3–3)	Kyle Farnsworth (10)	12,783	29–26	

June (14–13)

#	Date	Opponent	Score	Win	Loss	Save	Attendance	Record	Box
56	June 1	@ Rays	3–0	Colby Lewis (5–5)	David Price (6–5)	Neftalí Feliz (11)	13,725	30–26	
57	June 2	@ Indians	7–4	Michael Kirkman (1–0)	Carlos Carrasco (4–3)	Neftalí Feliz (12)	15,336	31–26	
58	June 3	@ Indians	11–2	Alexi Ogando (6–0)	Justin Masterson (5–4)		27,458	32–26	
59	June 4	@ Indians	4–0	Derek Holland (5–1)	Fausto Carmona (3–7)		30,130	33–26	
60	June 5	@ Indians	2–0	C. J. Wilson (6–3)	Mitch Talbot (2–2)	Neftalí Feliz (13)	20,621	34–26	
61	June 6	Tigers	7–13	Max Scherzer (7–2)	Colby Lewis (5–6)		33,921	34–27	
62	June 7	Tigers	1–8	Rick Porcello (6–3)	Matt Harrison (5–5)		35,165	34–28	
63	June 8	Tigers	7–3	Alexi Ogando (7–0)	Phil Coke (1–6)		40,388	35–28	
64	June 9	@ Twins	4–5	Jim Hoey (1–2)	Mark Lowe (1–1)		38,761	35–29	
65	June 10	@ Twins	9–3	C. J. Wilson (7–3)	Brian Duensing (3–6)		38,907	36–29	
66	June 11	@ Twins	1–8	Scott Baker (4–4)	Colby Lewis (5–7)		40,420	36–30	
67	June 12	@ Twins	1–6	Francisco Liriano (4–6)	Matt Harrison (5–6)		39,281	36–31	
68	June 14	@ Yankees	4–12	CC Sabathia (8–4)	Alexi Ogando (7–1)		43,457	36–32	
69	June 15	@ Yankees	4–12	Iván Nova (6–4)	Derek Holland (5–2)		45,969	36–33	
70	June 16	@ Yankees	2–3 (12)	Cory Wade (1–0)	Michael Kirkman (1–1)		47,487	36–34	
71	June 17	@ Braves	6–2	Colby Lewis (6–7)	Randall Delgado (0–1)		38,810	37–34	
72	June 18	@ Braves	5–4 (10)	Mark Lowe (2–1)	Scott Proctor (1–1)	Neftalí Feliz (14)	44,600	38–34	
73	June 19	@ Braves	2–4	Jair Jurrjens (9–3)	Alexi Ogando (7–2)	Craig Kimbrel (19)	34,599	38–35	
74	June 20	Astros	8–3	Derek Holland (6–2)	J. A. Happ (3–9)		41,205	39–35	
75	June 21	Astros	5–4 (11)	Yoshinori Tateyama (1–0)	Enerio Del Rosario (0–2)		33,533	40–35	
76	June 22	Astros	3–5	Mark Melancon (5–1)	Neftalí Feliz (0–1)		39,708	40–36	
77	June 24	Mets	8–1	Matt Harrison (6–6)	Mike Pelfrey (4–6)		46,092	41–36	
78	June 25	Mets	5–14	Jon Niese (7–6)	Alexi Ogando (7–3)		37,292	41–37	
79	June 26	Mets	5–8	Dillon Gee (8–1)	Derek Holland (6–3)		37,879	41–38	
80	June 28	@ Astros	7–3	C. J. Wilson (8–3)	Jordan Lyles (0–3)	Neftalí Feliz (15)	29,132	42–38	
81	June 29	@ Astros	3–2	Colby Lewis (7–7)	Brett Myers (3–7)	Neftalí Feliz (16)	24,472	43–38	
82	June 30	@ Astros	0–7	Wandy Rodríguez (6–4)	Matt Harrison (6–7)		25,938	43–39	

July (18–9)

#	Date	Opponent	Score	Win	Loss	Save	Attendance	Record	Box
83	July 1	Marlins	15–5	Alexi Ogando (8–3)	Aníbal Sánchez (6–2)		32,474	44–39	
84	July 2	Marlins	5–9	Steve Cishek (1–1)	Derek Holland (6–4)		29,728	44–40	
85	July 3	Marlins	4–6	Michael Dunn (5–5)	Mark Lowe (2–2)	Leo Núñez (23)	46,092	44–41	
86	July 4	Orioles	13–4	Colby Lewis (8–7)	Chris Jakubauskas (2–2)		42,885	45–41	
87	July 5	Orioles	4–2	Tommy Hunter (1–0)	Jim Johnson (5–2)	Neftalí Feliz (17)	25,945	46–41	
88	July 6	Orioles	13–5	Alexi Ogando (9–3)	Jeremy Guthrie (3–11)		31,953	47–41	
89	July 7	Athletics	6–0	Derek Holland (7–4)	Rich Harden (1–1)		35,041	48–41	
90	July 8	Athletics	8–5	C. J. Wilson (9–3)	Gio González (8–6)		37,858	49–41	
91	July 9	Athletics	7–6	Darren Oliver (2–5)	Andrew Bailey (0–2)		34,066	50–41	
92	July 10	Athletics	2–0	Matt Harrison (7–7)	Trevor Cahill (8–7)	Neftalí Feliz (18)	33,834	51–41	
93	July 14	@ Mariners	5–0	Derek Holland (8–4)	Jason Vargas (6–7)		25,997	52–41	
94	July 15	@ Mariners	4–0	Colby Lewis (9–7)	Doug Fister (3–11)	Neftalí Feliz (19)	30,551	53–41	
95	July 16	@ Mariners	5–1	C. J. Wilson (10–3)	Félix Hernández (8–8)		30,896	54–41	
96	July 17	@ Mariners	3–1	Matt Harrison (8–7)	Blake Beavan (1–1)	Neftalí Feliz (20)	30,335	55–41	
97	July 19	@ Angels	7–0	Alexi Ogando (10–3)	Tyler Chatwood (5–6)		43,103	56–41	
98	July 20	@ Angels	8–9	Hisanori Takahashi (3–2)	Tommy Hunter (1–1)	Jordan Walden (22)	40,052	56–42	
99	July 21	@ Angels	0–1	Jered Weaver (13–4)	C. J. Wilson (10–4)	Jordan Walden (23)	38,315	56–43	
100	July 22	Blue Jays	12–2	Colby Lewis (10–7)	Jo-Jo Reyes (5–8)		37,360	57–43	
101	July 23	Blue Jays	5–4	Darren Oliver (3–5)	Marc Rzepczynski (2–3)		38,537	58–43	
102	July 24	Blue Jays	0–3	Brett Cecil (3–4)	Alexi Ogando (10–4)		43,117	58–44	
103	July 25	Twins	20–6	Derek Holland (9–4)	Nick Blackburn (7–7)		35,573	59–44	
104	July 26	Twins	8–9	Glen Perkins (3–1)	Neftalí Feliz (0–2)	Joe Nathan (8)	30,581	59–45	
105	July 27	Twins	2–7	Brian Duensing (8–8)	Colby Lewis (10–8)		35,950	59–46	
106	July 28	Twins	4–1	Matt Harrison (9–7)	Scott Baker (8–6)	Neftalí Feliz (21)	30,406	60–46	
107	July 29	@ Blue Jays	2–3	Brett Cecil (4–4)	Alexi Ogando (10–5)	Jon Rauch (9)	19,287	60–47	
108	July 30	@ Blue Jays	3–0	Derek Holland (10–4)	Brad Mills (0–1)		22,560	61–47	
109	July 31	@ Blue Jays	3–7	Brandon Morrow (8–5)	C. J. Wilson (10–5)		45,629	61–48	

August (16–12)

#	Date	Opponent	Score	Win	Loss	Save	Attendance	Record	Box
110	August 2	@ Tigers	5–6	Joaquín Benoit (3–3)	Mike Adams (3–2)	José Valverde (29)	29,067	61–49	
111	August 3	@ Tigers	4–5	Doug Fister (4–12)	Matt Harrison (9–8)	José Valverde (30)	33,596	61–50	
112	August 4	@ Tigers	5–2	Alexi Ogando (11–5)	Brad Penny (7–9)	Neftalí Feliz (22)	40,497	62–50	
113	August 5	Indians	8–7 (11)	Neftalí Feliz (1–2)	Rafael Pérez (4–2)		37,842	63–50	
114	August 6	Indians	5–7	Frank Herrmann (2–0)	Neftalí Feliz (1–3)	Chris Perez (23)	38,210	63–51	
115	August 7	Indians	5–3	Darren Oliver (4–5)	Joe Smith (2–3)	Mike Adams (2)	37,431	64–51	
116	August 8	Mariners	9–2	Matt Harrison (10–8)	Charlie Furbush (2–4)		27,771	65–51	
117	August 9	Mariners	7–6	Neftalí Feliz (2–3)	Jeff Gray (0–1)		25,214	66–51	
118	August 10	Mariners	3–4	Jason Vargas (7–10)	Koji Uehara (1–2)	Brandon League (27)	30,087	66–52	
119	August 12	@ Athletics	9–1	C. J. Wilson (11–5)	Brandon McCarthy (5–6)		20,288	67–52	
120	August 13	@ Athletics	7–1	Colby Lewis (11–8)	Trevor Cahill (9–11)		25,160	68–52	
121	August 14	@ Athletics	7–6	Mike Adams (1–0)	Andrew Bailey (0–3)	Neftalí Feliz (23)	15,107	69–52	
122	August 15	@ Angels	8–4	Alexi Ogando (12–5)	Bobby Cassevah (1–1)		36,663	70–52	
123	August 16	@ Angels	7–1	Derek Holland (11–4)	Tyler Chatwood (6–9)		43,711	71–52	
124	August 17	@ Angels	4–3	C. J. Wilson (12–5)	Ervin Santana (9–9)	Neftalí Feliz (24)	36,581	72–52	
125	August 18	@ Angels	1–2	Horacio Ramírez (1–0)	Mike Adams (4–3)		41,123	72–53	
126	August 19	@ White Sox	7–4	Yoshinori Tateyama (2–0)	Jake Peavy (5–6)	Neftalí Feliz (25)	28,308	73–53	
127	August 20	@ White Sox	2–3	Jesse Crain (8–3)	Koji Uehara (1–3)	Sergio Santos (26)	30,021	73–54	
128	August 21	@ White Sox	0–10	Gavin Floyd (11–10)	Derek Holland (11–5)		25,033	73–55	
129	August 22	Red Sox	4–0	C. J. Wilson (13–5)	Érik Bédard (4–9)		33,920	74–55	
130	August 23	Red Sox	5–11	John Lackey (12–9)	Colby Lewis (11–9)		25,705	74–56	
131	August 24	Red Sox	2–13	Josh Beckett (11–5)	Matt Harrison (10–9)		30,724	74–57	
132	August 25	Red Sox	0–6	Andrew Miller (6–1)	Alexi Ogando (12–6)		29,729	74–58	
133	August 26	Angels	11–7	Derek Holland (12–5)	Dan Haren (13–7)		38,256	75–58	
134	August 27	Angels	4–8	Ervin Santana (10–9)	C. J. Wilson (13–6)	Hisanori Takahashi (2)	48,453	75–59	
135	August 28	Angels	9–5	Darren Oliver (5–5)	Jered Weaver (15–7)		40,018	76–59	
136	August 30	Rays	2–0	Scott Feldman (1–0)	Jeremy Hellickson (11–10)	Neftalí Feliz (26)	40,018	77–59	
137	August 31	Rays	1–4	James Shields (13–10)	Alexi Ogando (12–7)		40,018	77–60	

September (19–6)

#	Date	Opponent	Score	Win	Loss	Save	Attendance	Record	Box
138	September 1	Rays	7–2	C. J. Wilson (14–6)	Jeff Niemann (9–6)		26,220	78–60	
139	September 2	@ Red Sox	13–0	Derek Holland (13–5)	Andrew Miller (6–2)		38,083	79–60	
140	September 3	@ Red Sox	7–12	Érik Bédard (5–9)	Colby Lewis (11–10)		38,083	79–61	
141	September 4	@ Red Sox	11–4	Matt Harrison (11–9)	Lackey (12–11)		37,744	80–61	
142	September 5	@ Rays	1–5	Shields (14–10)	Feldman (1–1)		13,130	80–62	
143	September 6	@ Rays	8–0	C. J. Wilson (15–6)	Jeff Niemann (9–7)		11,611	81–62	
144	September 7	@ Rays	4–5	Jake McGee (2–1)	Mark Lowe (2–3)		11,190	81–63	
145	September 9	Athletics	13–4	Colby Lewis (12–10)	Brandon McCarthy (8–8)		36,706	82–63	
146	September 10	Athletics	7–8	Trevor Cahill (11–13)	Alexi Ogando (12–8)	Andrew Bailey (20)	46,151	82–64	
147	September 11	Athletics	8–1	C. J. Wilson (16–6)	Josh Outman (3–5)		46,727	83–64	
148	September 13	Indians	10–4	Matt Harrison (12–9)	Justin Masterson (11–10)		30,107	84–64	
149	September 14	Indians	9–1	Derek Holland (14–5)	David Huff		38,710	85–64	
150	September 15	Indians	7–4	Alexi Ogando (13–8)	Fausto Carmona		44,242	86–64	
151	September 16	@ Mariners	0–4	Blake Beavan (5–5)	C. J. Wilson (16–7)		17,607	86–65	
152	September 17	@ Mariners	7–6	Colby Lewis (13–10)	Anthony Vasquez (1–4)	Neftalí Feliz (27)	22,159	87–65	
153	September 18	@ Mariners	3–0	Matt Harrison (13–9)	Félix Hernández (14–13)	Neftalí Feliz (28)	21,479	88–65	
154	September 20	@ Athletics	7–2	Derek Holland (15–5)	Rich Harden (4–4)		13,635	89–65	
155	September 21	@ Athletics	3–2	Koji Uehara (2–3)	Grant Balfour (4–2)	Neftalí Feliz (29)	19,589	90–65	
156	September 22	@ Athletics	3–4	Grant Balfour (5–2)	Mike Adams (4–4)	Andrew Bailey (21)	14,090	90–66	
157	September 23	Mariners	5–3	Matt Harrison (14–9)	Anthony Vasquez (1–5)	Neftalí Feliz (30)	43,874	91–66	
158	September 24	Mariners	7–3	Scott Feldman (2–1)	Félix Hernández (14–14)		40,242	92–66	
159	September 25	Mariners	12–5	Derek Holland (16–5)	Charlie Furbush (4–10)		43,508	93–66	
160	September 26	@ Angels	4–3	Mark Hamburger (1–0)	Dan Haren (16–10)	Neftalí Feliz (31)	39,716	94–66	
161	September 27	@ Angels	10–3	Colby Lewis (14–10)	Tyler Chatwood (6–11)		39,529	95–66	
162	September 28	@ Angels	3–1	Mike Adams (5–4)	Jordan Walden (5–5)	Neftalí Feliz (32)	39,612	96–66	

Legend
Rangers Win	Rangers Loss	Game postponed

2011 Post-season Game Log (10-7)
ALDS vs. Rays (3–1)

#	Date	Opponent	Score	Win	Loss	Save	Attendance	Record	Box
1	September 30	Rays	0–9	Matt Moore (1–0)	C. J. Wilson (0–1)		50,498	0–1	
2	October 1	Rays	8–6	Derek Holland (1–0)	James Shields (0–1)	Neftalí Feliz (1)	51,351	1–1	
3	October 3	@ Rays	4–3	Colby Lewis (1–0)	David Price (0–1)	Neftalí Feliz (2)	32,828	2–1	
4	October 4	@ Rays	4–3	Matt Harrison (1–0)	Jeremy Hellickson (0–1)	Neftalí Feliz (3)	28,299	3–1	

ALCS vs. Tigers (4–2)

#	Date	Opponent	Score	Win	Loss	Save	Attendance	Record	Box
1	October 8	Tigers	3–2	Alexi Ogando (1–0)	Justin Verlander (0–1)	Neftalí Feliz (1)	50,114	1–0	
2	October 10	Tigers	7–3 (11)	Mike Adams (1–0)	Ryan Perry (0–1)		51,227	2–0	
3	October 11	@ Tigers	2–5	Doug Fister (1–0)	Colby Lewis (0–1)	José Valverde (1)	41,905	2–1	
4	October 12	@ Tigers	7–3	Scott Feldman (1–0)	José Valverde (0–1)		42,234	3–1	
5	October 13	@ Tigers	5–7	Justin Verlander (1–1)	C. J. Wilson (0–1)	Phil Coke (1)	41,908	3–2	
6	October 15	Tigers	15–5	Alexi Ogando (2–0)	Max Scherzer (0–1)		51,508	4–2	

World Series vs. Cardinals (3–4)

#	Date	Opponent	Score	Win	Loss	Save	Attendance	Record	Box
1	October 19	@ Cardinals	2–3	Chris Carpenter (1–0)	C. J. Wilson (0–1)	Jason Motte (1)	46,406	0–1	
2	October 20	@ Cardinals	2–1	Mike Adams (1–0)	Jason Motte (0–1)	Neftalí Feliz (1)	47,288	1–1	
3	October 22	Cardinals	7–16	Lance Lynn (1–0)	Matt Harrison (0–1)		51,462	1–2	
4	October 23	Cardinals	4–0	Derek Holland (1–0)	Edwin Jackson (0–1)		51,539	2–2	
5	October 24	Cardinals	4–2	Darren Oliver (1–0)	Octavio Dotel (0–1)	Neftalí Feliz (2)	51,459	3–2	
6	October 27	@ Cardinals	9–10 (11)	Jake Westbrook (1–0)	Mark Lowe (0–1)		47,325	3–3	
7	October 28	@ Cardinals	2–6	Chris Carpenter (2–0)	Matt Harrison (0–2)		47,399	3–4	

== Farm system ==
Level	Team	League	Manager
AAA	Round Rock Express	Pacific Coast League	Bobby Jones
AA	Frisco RoughRiders	Texas League	Steve Buechele
A	Myrtle Beach Pelicans	Carolina League	Jason Wood
A	Hickory Crawdads	South Atlantic League	Bill Richardson
A-Short Season	Spokane Indians	Northwest League	Tim Hulett
Rookie	AZL Rangers	Arizona League	Héctor Ortiz
