= Granville Central High School =

American public school in North Carolina

Location
- 2043 Sanders Road; Stem, North Carolina 27581; United States
- Coordinates: 36°12′46″N 78°41′15″W

Information
- School type: Public
- Founded: September 2007 (18 years ago)
- School district: Granville County Schools
- CEEB code: 343809
- Principal: Janita Allen
- Teaching staff: 36.08 (FTE)
- Grades: 9–12
- Enrollment: 611 (2023-2024)
- Student to teacher ratio: 16.93
- Colors: Black and silver
- Mascot: Panthers
- Website: gchs.gcs.k12.nc.us

Granville Central High School (GCHS) was a high school located in Stem, North Carolina and was part of the Granville County Schools system.

Granville Central opened for the 2007–2008 school year for grades 9 and 10. It was opened partially to relieve the overcrowded J. F. Webb High School and South Granville High School. The following school year the junior class was added, and in 2009–2010 the senior class was added. The first graduating class from GCHS was the class of 2010. Although, the first class to graduate from the full-term milestone (all grade progress attended at GCHS) was the 2011 class.

Granville Central closed at the end of the 2024-2025 school year, with the student population being dispersed to J.F. Webb and South Granville. The campus now serves as a new middle school with students from Butner-Stem Middle School and G.C. Hawley Middle School, both of which closed at the same time.

Student Attendance:

- Total Students (estimated) – 638
- Student Demographics – 39% Hispanic, 31% Black, 23% White, 5% Two or more Races, 1% Asian, 1% American Indian
- Notable Alumni

== Sports ==
Granville Central offers a variety of sports including wrestling, baseball, basketball, soccer, volleyball, softball, football, cross country, track and field, and tennis.
