= Derek Holland =

American baseball player (born 1986)

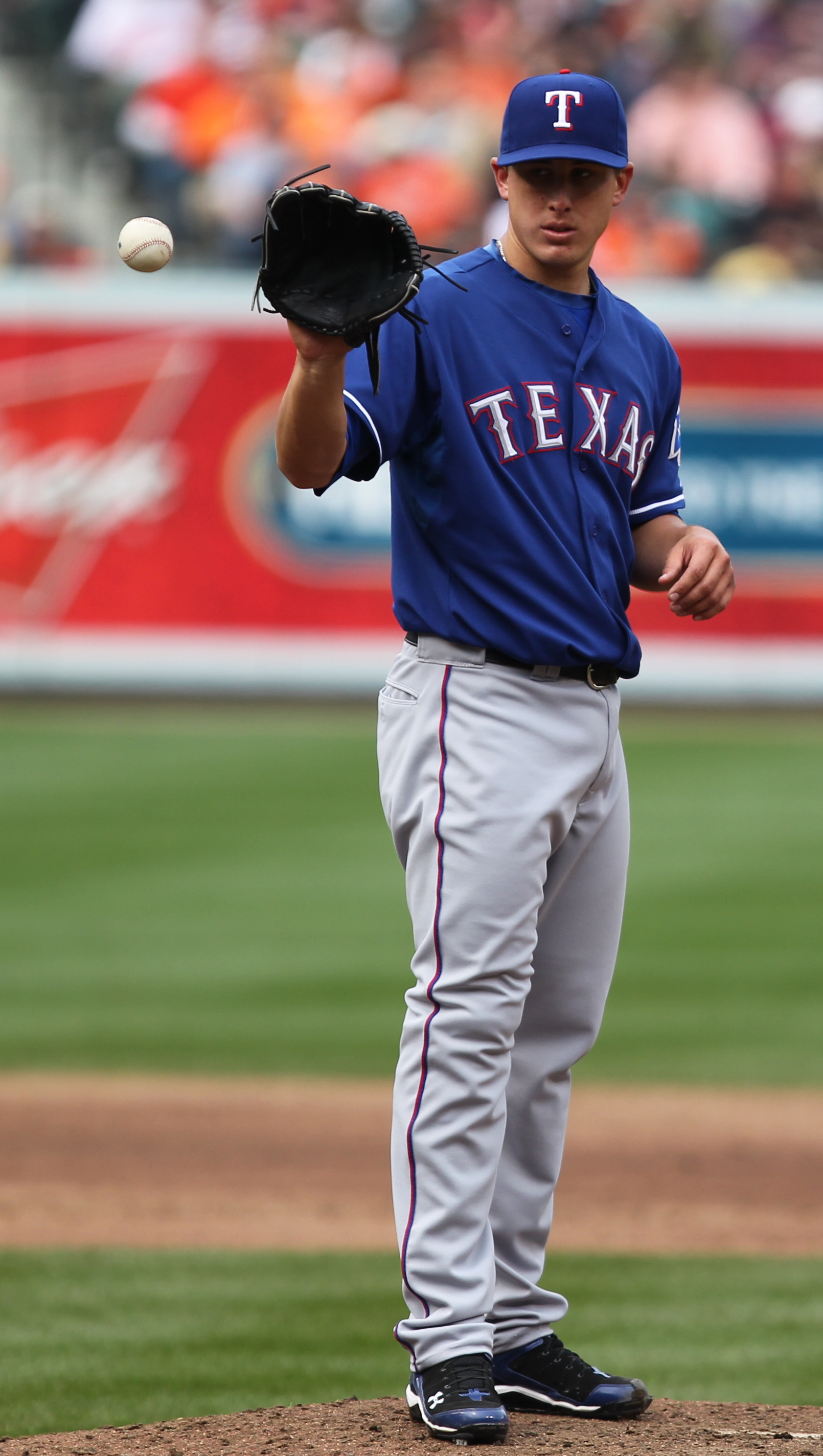
- Holland with the Texas Rangers in 2011
- Pitcher
- Born: October 9, 1986 (age 40); Newark, Ohio, U.S.
- Batted: Switch Threw: Left

MLB debut
- April 22, 2009, for the Texas Rangers

Last MLB appearance
- September 29, 2021, for the Detroit Tigers

MLB statistics
- Win–loss record: 82–83
- Earned run average: 4.62
- Strikeouts: 1,241
- Stats at Baseball Reference

Teams
- Texas Rangers (2009–2016); Chicago White Sox (2017); San Francisco Giants (2018–2019); Chicago Cubs (2019); Pittsburgh Pirates (2020); Detroit Tigers (2021)

Derek Lane Holland (born October 9, 1986), nicknamed "Dutch Oven", is an American former professional baseball pitcher. He played in Major League Baseball (MLB) for the Texas Rangers, Chicago White Sox, San Francisco Giants, Chicago Cubs, Pittsburgh Pirates, and Detroit Tigers.

== Early life ==
Holland was born on October 9, 1986, in Newark, Ohio, to Wendy and Rick Holland.

== Professional career ==
=== Draft and minor leagues ===
The Texas Rangers selected Holland in the 25th round of the 2006 MLB draft out of Wallace State Community College in Hanceville, Alabama, a member of the National Junior College Athletic Association. He was the number two rated prospect in the Rangers organization according to Baseball America, behind Neftalí Feliz, for 2009.

=== Texas Rangers ===
==== 2009 season ====
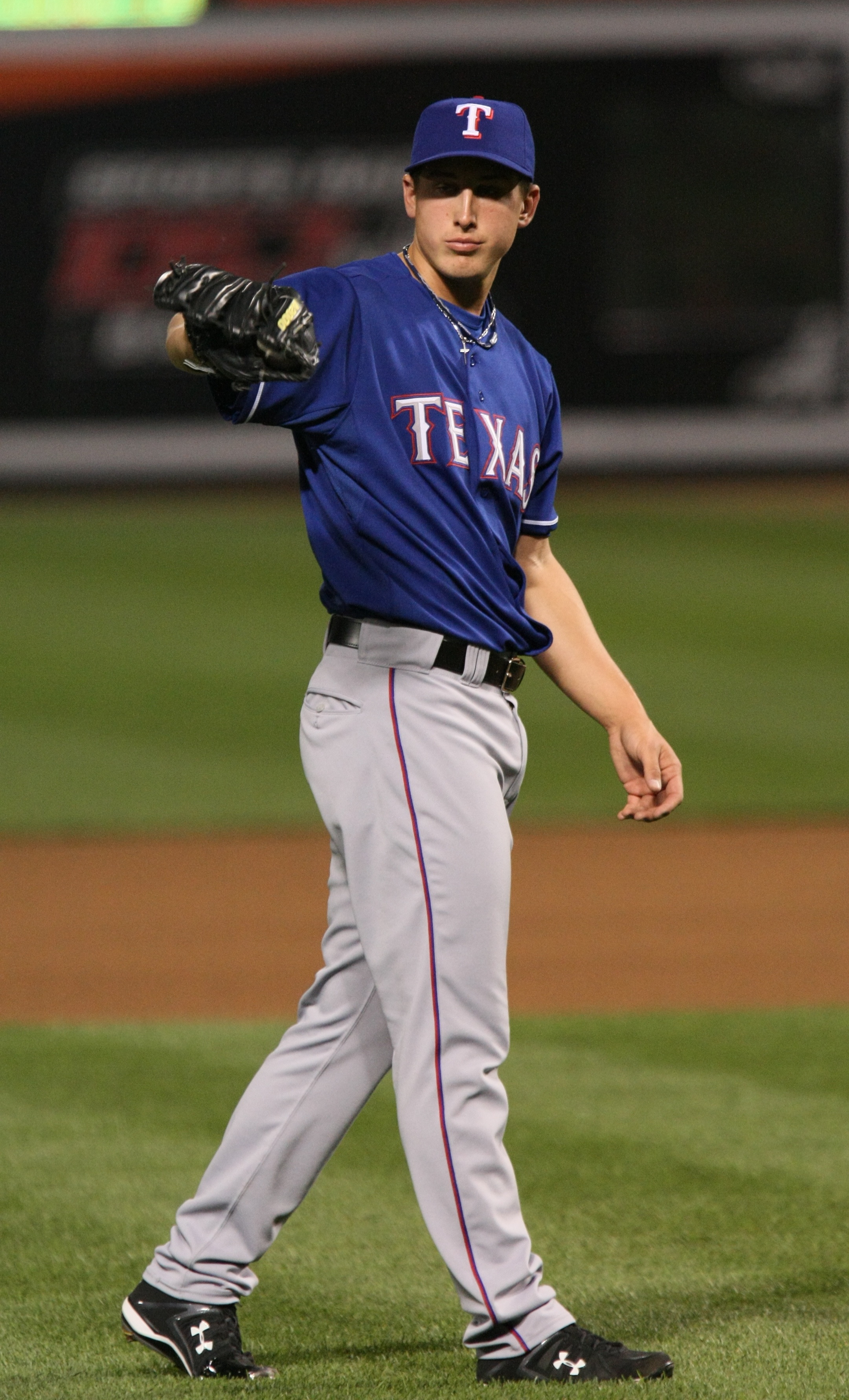
Holland during his 2009 rookie season

On April 22, 2009, Holland made his MLB debut; pitching 2 1/3 innings, allowing three hits, no runs, no walks, and striking out two. On August 9, he pitched his first complete game, a 7–0 shutout against the Los Angeles Angels of Anaheim in Anaheim. For the 2009 season, Holland finished the season 8–13 with a 6.12 ERA in 33 games (21 starts). Holland spent the majority of 2010 in Triple-A Oklahoma City, and was called up only due to injuries to other starters. After winning his first two decisions, he lost his next three. He ended the regular season with a 3–4 record, and 4.08 ERA.

==== 2010 season ====
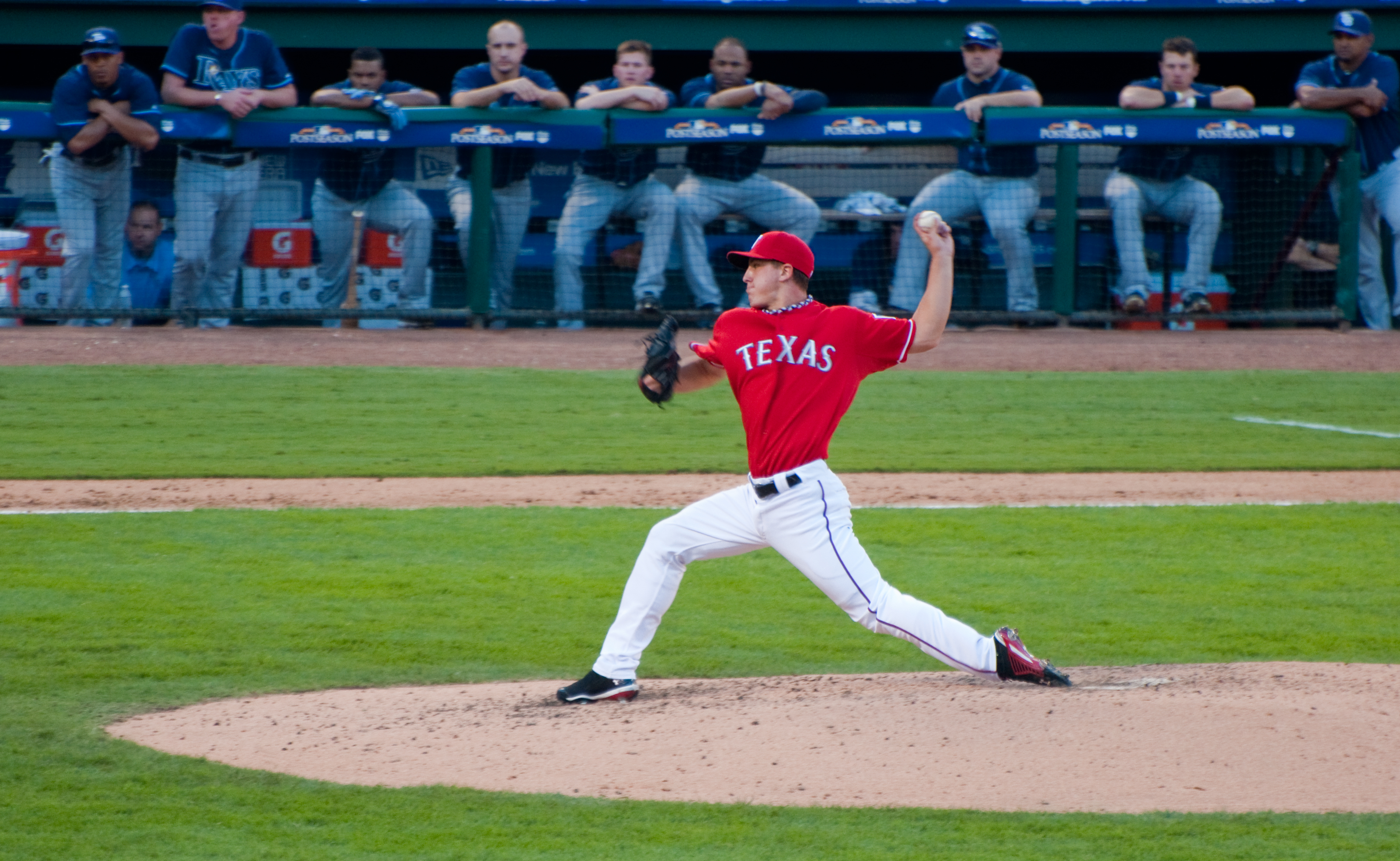
Holland with the Rangers in 2010

Holland allowed three runs in 4 2/3 innings in the 2010 ALDS against the Tampa Bay Rays. He pitched 5.2 innings in the 2010 ALCS with no earned runs. In Game 4, he earned the victory against the defending champion New York Yankees. He entered the game in the fourth inning with one out and the bases loaded, and got his team out of a serious jam while also eating away innings to protect his bullpen. In game 2 of the 2010 World Series, Holland entered with one on and two outs in the bottom of the 8th inning, with the Rangers trailing 2–0. Holland walked all three batters he faced without recording an out, and he forced in the runner he inherited via his final walk. Holland's wildness opened the door for what turned into a huge inning for the eventual champion Giants, as all three of the batters he walked came around to score. The Rangers lost the game 9–0. Holland pitched a scoreless relief inning in a game four 4–0 loss, and the Rangers lost the series 4–1.

==== 2011 season ====
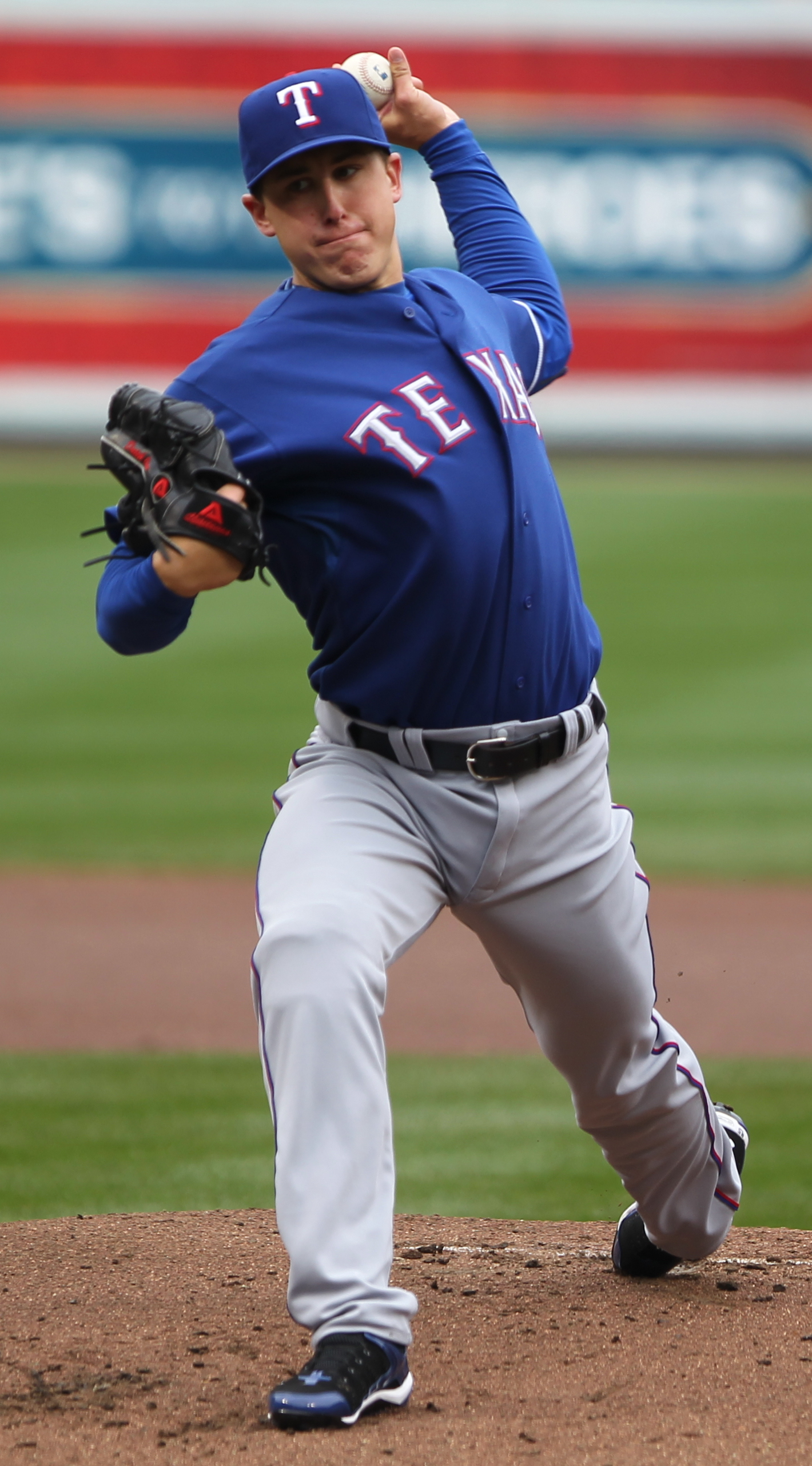
Holland pitching during the 2011 season

Holland started the 2011 season as a starter for the Rangers, and despite a 4.96 ERA, won four of his five starts in April and May. He lowered his ERA to 4.14 in June, mainly by virtue of his first shutout of the season. He started off July with inconsistency, failing to make it out of the first inning against the Marlins. Over the next five starts, he responded by throwing three more shutouts.

In 2011, he was 16–5 with a 3.95 ERA. He led the AL in shutouts (4; tied for fifth-most in Rangers history), was 3rd in win–loss percentage (.762; the fifth-best in Rangers history), and was 4th in wins. On October 23, Holland was the winning pitcher in Game 4 of the 2011 World Series against the St. Louis Cardinals, giving up no runs on two hits, two walks and striking out seven. He was pulled from the game after pitching 8 1/3 innings. The Rangers lost the World Series in seven games.

==== 2012 season ====
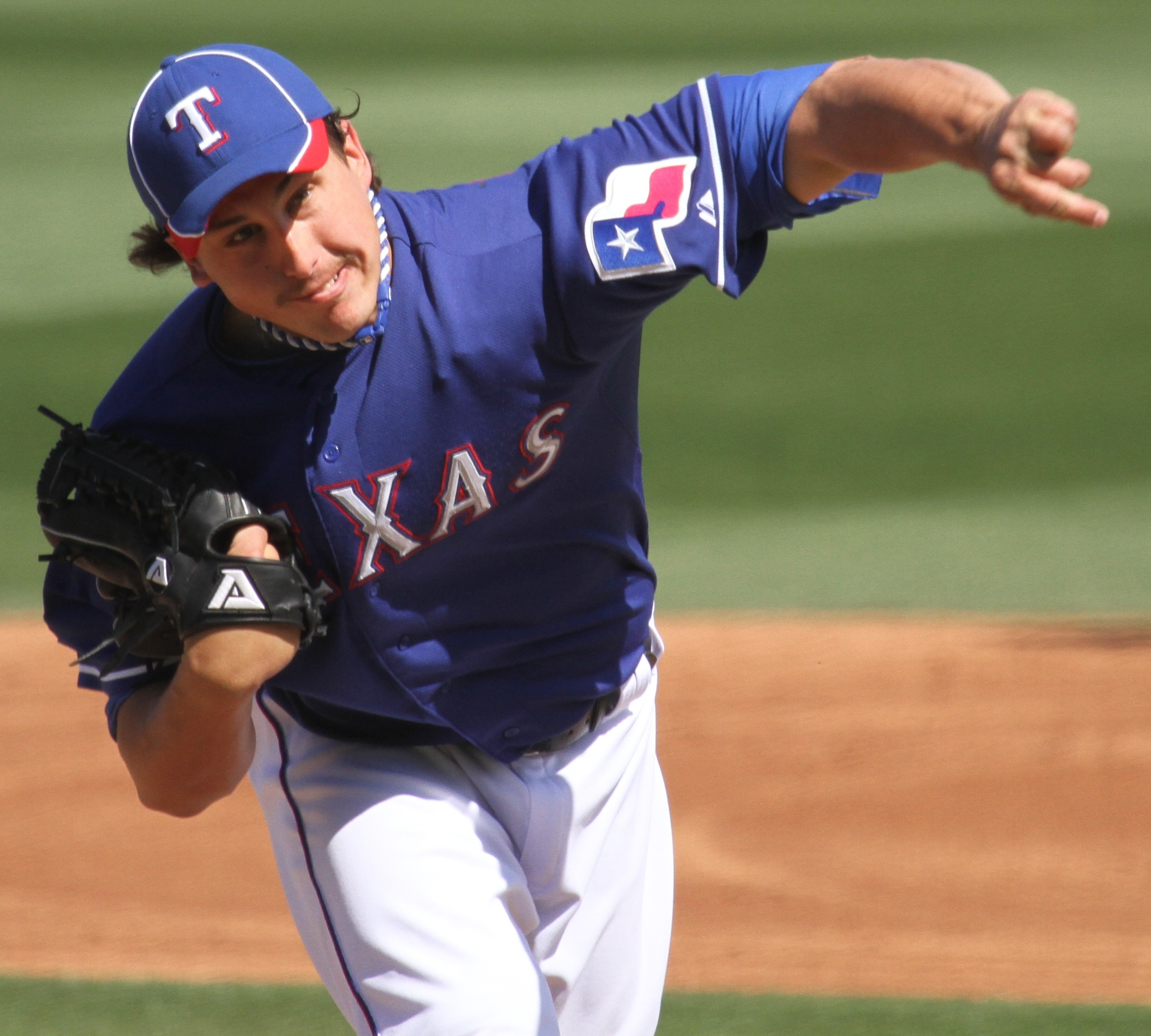
Holland during Spring Training in 2012

Holland signed a contract extension on March 20, 2012, that was worth $28.5 million over five years with a two-year club option. Holland finished the regular season with a win–loss record of 12–7 with an ERA of 4.67 as he gave up 32 home runs, fifth highest in Major League Baseball.

==== 2013 season ====
In 2013, Holland went 10–9 with a 3.42 ERA in 33 starts.

==== 2014 season ====
On January 7, 2014, Holland suffered a knee injury after a fall while playing with his dog at home. Holland underwent arthroscopic microfracture surgery to repair torn cartilage in his left knee on January 10, 2014. He was placed on the 60-day disabled list and sidelined until the All-Star break.

==== 2015 season ====
Holland strained his subscapularis muscle during the Rangers' first home game of the 2015 season, and was placed on the 60-day disabled list on April 10. Holland returned on August 19, 2015 to start against the Seattle Mariners. He went 6 1/3 innings pitched with six strikeouts and 2 earned runs as he earned his first win of the season in a 7–2 Rangers' win. On August 30, Holland threw a complete game against the Baltimore Orioles at Globe Life Park. His last complete game was on September 23, 2013. It was his eighth career shutout. He went nine innings, no walks, no runs, 11 strikeouts, and allowed only three hits, in a 6–0 win.

On November 8, 2016, the Rangers announced they would decline a 2017 club option on Holland, making him a free agent. Holland was due to receive $11 million in pay in 2017, and received a $1.5 million buyout.

=== Chicago White Sox ===
On December 14, 2016, Holland signed a one-year, $6 million contract with the Chicago White Sox. Holland began the season with a 2.37 ERA in 10 starts, but afterwards, his performance regressed immensely. He was granted an unconditional release on September 5, 2017, after a 7–14 record, 6.20 ERA and a 1.71 WHIP through 26 starts and 3 relief appearances with the White Sox.

=== San Francisco Giants ===
On February 9, 2018, Holland signed a minor league contract with the San Francisco Giants. With injuries to Madison Bumgarner and Jeff Samardzija, Holland was added to the rotation at the beginning of the season. Throughout the season, he would make starts and also provide relief appearances from the bullpen. He finished the 2018 season with a 7–9 record and a 3.57 ERA.

On January 14, 2019, the Giants re-signed Holland to a one-year deal with a club option for 2020, earning a base salary of $6.5 million and a $500,000 buyout for 2020. Holland earned his first win of the season on April 9 against the Padres. On April 29, Holland was placed on the 10-day injured list with a bone bruise in his left index finger. Upon returning from the IL, he started against Colorado, giving up seven earned runs over 2 2/3 innings. In a post-game interview on May 11, Holland told the media that he "faked an injury" and questioned the Front Office's operations. Bruce Bochy and Farhan Zaidi both responded to his statement, chastising him for not approaching them first before speaking to the media and ensuring they had an open door policy when it comes to player concerns. Since his start in Colorado, Holland has been relegated to long-relief appearances out of the bullpen.

On July 21, 2019, Holland was designated for assignment.

=== Chicago Cubs ===
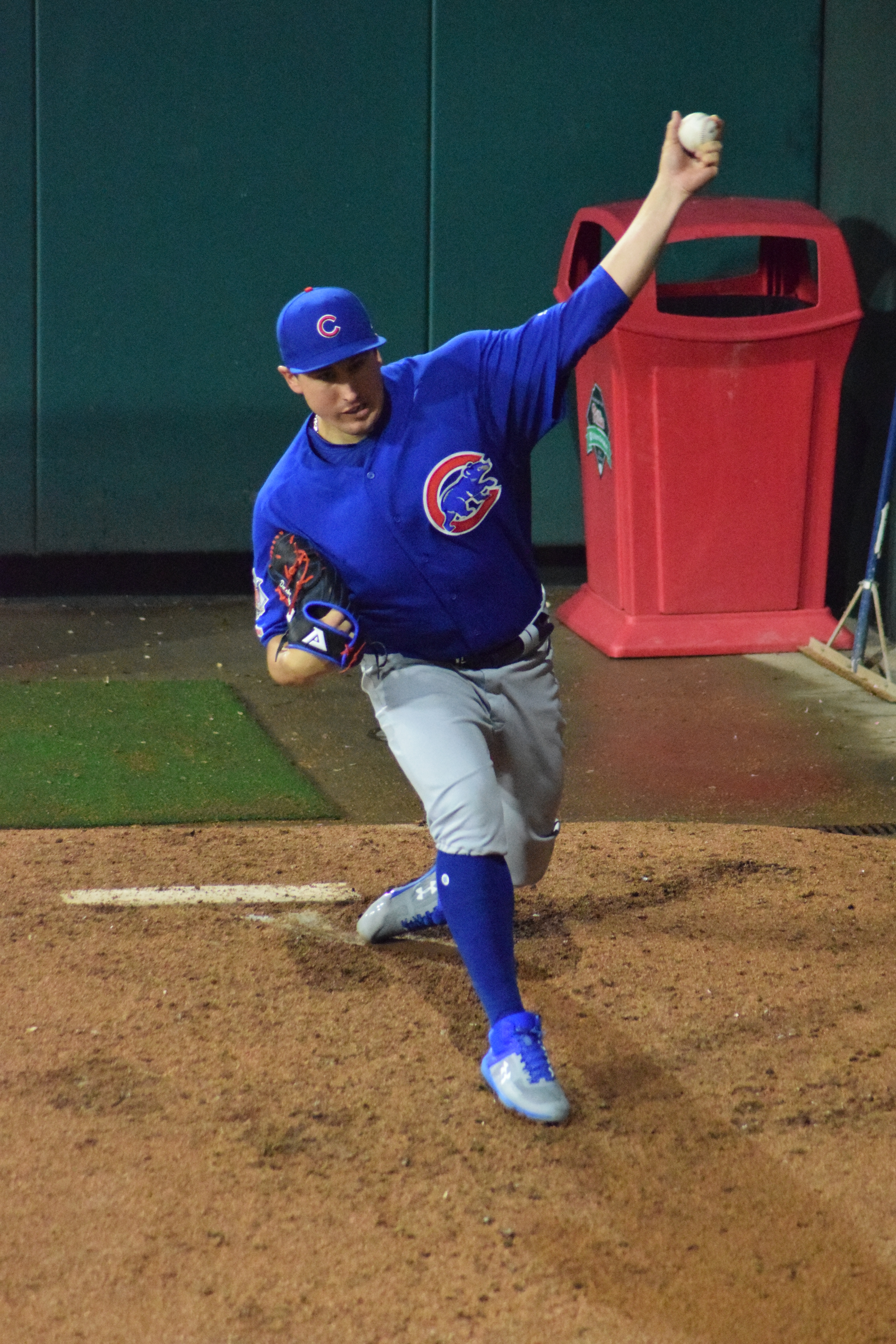
Holland warming up in the bullpen with the Cubs in 2019

On July 26, 2019, the Giants traded Holland to the Chicago Cubs for cash considerations. On August 25, 2019, he was placed on the 10 day IL and sent down to the Triple-A Iowa Cubs and was replaced with David Bote. Holland became a free agent following the 2019 season.

=== Pittsburgh Pirates ===
On January 31, 2020, Holland signed a minor league contract with the Pittsburgh Pirates that included an invitation to Spring Training.

On August 8, 2020, against the Detroit Tigers, Holland allowed 5 runs on 4 home runs within his first 11 pitches of the first inning. He allowed a total of 9 runs on 5 home runs all in 5 innings as the Pirates lost 11–5.

=== Detroit Tigers ===
On February 1, 2021, Holland signed a minor league contract with the Detroit Tigers that included an invitation to Spring Training. On March 26, Tigers manager A. J. Hinch announced that Holland had won a spot on the Tigers opening day roster as a reliever, and that the team would clear room for him on the 40-man roster. On April 1, Holland was selected to the 40-man roster. He made 39 appearances (38 in relief) for the 2021 Tigers, posting a 3–2 record with a 5.07 ERA and 51 strikeouts in 49 2/3 innings.

=== Boston Red Sox ===
On March 18, 2022, Holland signed a minor league deal with the Boston Red Sox. Holland was reassigned to the minor leagues on April 2, but did not exercise the opt-out clause in his contract. Holland opted out of his deal with the Red Sox on May 1, 2022.

=== Toronto Blue Jays ===
On May 4, 2022, three days after opting out of his deal with Boston, Holland signed a minor league deal with the Toronto Blue Jays. Holland appeared in 20 games (6 starts) for the Triple-A Buffalo Bisons, posting a 5.53 ERA with 25 strikeouts in 27.2 innings pitched. He was released by the Blue Jays organization on July 22.

=== York Revolution ===
On May 24, 2023, Holland signed with the York Revolution of the Atlantic League of Professional Baseball. In 5 appearances out of the bullpen for York, he registered a 2.25 ERA with 5 strikeouts and 1 save in 4.0 innings of work. On June 6, Holland announced that he would require Tommy John surgery, ending his season. He underwent the procedure on June 19. He became a free agent following the season.

== Post–playing career ==
Holland joined the Dallas College North Lake baseball staff as a volunteer pitching and first base coach for the 2024 season.

Holland served as the bullpen coach for the American League team in the 2024 All-Star Futures Game.

On June 20, 2025, the UT Dallas Comets announced that Holland would join the team for the 2026 season as a volunteer pitching coach.

== Controversies ==
During a game in the 2012 season, Holland's Twitter account was used to attack another Twitter user with a slur. Holland responded to the ensuing controversy by claiming his Twitter account was hacked.

In 2018, Holland appeared in a skit on MLB Network's Intentional Talk in which he mocked Asian people by feigning a racially insensitive accent. Holland didn't agree with assertions that his actions were racist, but said he understood why people were upset. The San Francisco Giants and Holland later apologized for his actions.

In 2019, Holland verbally attacked the Giants and claimed they made him fake an injury so as to be placed on the injured list. The Giants denied the allegation.

== 60 feet 6 Foundation ==
In 2014, Holland launched the 60 Feet 6 Foundation to help raise awareness of and fund research for leukemia, particularly its pediatric forms. Through the charity, he raises funds to help families battling the disease.
