= South Granville High School =

American public school in North Carolina

Location
- 701 N. Crescent Drive; Creedmoor, North Carolina 27522; United States; 36°07′23″N 78°40′31″W

Information
- School type: Public
- Founded: 1962 (64 years ago)
- CEEB code: 340032
- Principal: Ashley Clark
- Grades: 9–12
- Enrollment: 709 (2022, 2023)
- Language: English
- Colors: Columbia blue and white
- Mascot: Vikings
- Website: sghs.gcs.k12.nc.us

South Granville High is a high school in Creedmoor, North Carolina, and is part of the Granville County Schools system.

== History ==
South Granville High School was built in 1962 as a replacement high school for the already existing Creedmoor High (also located in Creedmoor; later known as the Creedmoor School).

Since the Supreme Court case of Brown vs. Board of Education, the schools of North Carolina worked to become integrated. In Granville County integration did not occur until late 1969. The black high school, G. C. Hawley (est. 1936), located a mile away from South Granville, became the junior high school in 1970 taking the grades of 5–8, and South Granville became the high school with grades of 9–12. Since 1964 the South Granville athletics has had a rivalry with J. F. Webb High School located at the northern end of Granville County in Oxford.

The school celebrated its 60th anniversary in 2022.

== Renovations and additions ==
The school was originally a small building with a few hundred students in attendance, but additions were made to the school over the years, as more students moved into the area.

A new wing was added onto the back part of the building in the late 1980s. In 1992, the school added a new entrance to the building (containing a lobby, auditorium, band room, restrooms, and auxiliary gym). In late 1998, the county added another wing to the school on the south end of the building which housed more classrooms. The county decided in 2008 to add an addition to this wing. Along with the new addition, a newer entrance was added as an administration wing.

== Notable events ==
=== 2005 Mercury scare ===
In October 2005, South Granville was closed for three days after two students stole mercury from an unlocked cabinet. They allegedly passed it around and took it home, potentially exposing dozens to toxic mercury vapors. Health officials conducted air quality tests. Fourteen classrooms had mercury vapor levels higher than the recommended level by the Environmental Protection Agency. The officials recovered most of the mercury from the boy's house buried in his backyard. The two students were expelled from the school for the rest of the year, and the science teacher was suspended pending on board investigations (he was found innocent and retained his job). A month later, school officials said a student found a small amount of mercury in a boys' bathroom. Teachers placed the mercury in a bottle and turned it over to emergency management officials. Officials said air quality tests conducted that night revealed "no evidence of additional mercury at the school."

== Overview and Ranking ==
According to the data presented by the US News, South Granville High School is ranked between 478th and 604th within North Carolina. Students have the opportunity to take Advanced Placement® coursework and exams. The AP® participation rate at South Granville High School is 29%. The total minority enrollment is 57%, and 97% of students are economically disadvantaged. South Granville High School is 1 of 6 high schools in the Granville County Schools.

South Granville High School is ranked from #13,460-17,945 in the National Rankings. Schools are ranked on their performance on state-required tests, graduation and how well they prepare students for college.

=== All Rankings ===
- #13,460-17,945 in National Rankings
- #478-604 in North Carolina High Schools
- #3-5 in Granville County Schools High Schools

== Student attendance ==
- Total students (estimated) – 709
- Student Demographics: 42.6% White, 27.2% Black, 23.4% Hispanic, 5.8% Two or more Races, .8% Asian, .1% American Indian

== Sports ==
The sports program includes

- Football
- Basketball (Men & Women)
- Cheerleading
- Baseball
- Soccer (Men & Women)
- Wrestling
- Softball
- Tennis (Men & Women)
- Cross Country
- Track & Field
- Golf (Men & Women)
- Marching Band

== Notable alumni ==
- Ty Adcock – MLB pitcher
- Linda L. Bray – former U.S. Army officer known for being the first woman in the United States military to lead troops into combat
- Matt Harrison – former Major League Baseball pitcher and All-Star selection in 2012
- William Jeffery Johnson – former Major League Baseball pitcher with the New York Yankees
