= Granville County Schools =

School district in North Carolina, U.S.

Location
- Granville County, North Carolina United States

District information
- Type: Public
- Grades: PK–12
- Established: 1963
- Superintendent: Dr. Stan Winborne
- Schools: 15
- Budget: $97,797,334 (2024)
- NCES District ID: 3701800

Students and staff
- Students: 6,627 (2022, 2023)
- Teachers: 560.78 (on FTE basis)
- Staff: 485.15 (on FTE basis)
- Student–teacher ratio: 13:1

Other information
- Website: www.gcs.k12.nc.us

Granville County Schools is a PK–12 graded school district serving Granville County, North Carolina. Its 15 schools serve approximately 6,627 students as of the 2022- 2023 school year. The system was formed in 1963 from the merger of the former Granville County Schools and Oxford City schools. Granville county public schools now offers year round schools, and also the new Granville academy which offers different way of leaning.

== History ==
The move towards merging the Granville County Schools system with the Oxford City Schools system was approved by the North Carolina General Assembly in 1961. The official merging of the systems occurred in July, 1963.

== Student demographics ==
For the 2022- 2023 school year, Granville County Schools has a total population of about 6,627 students and 560.78 teachers on a (FTE) basis. This produced a student-teacher ratio of 13:1. This year, out of the student total, the gender ratio is 52% male to 48% female. The demographic group makeup is: 35% Black, 34% White, 24% Hispanic, 6% Two or more Races, .7% Asian, .3% American Indian. For the same school year, 58% of the students received free and reduced-cost lunches.

== Governance ==
The primary governing body of Granville County Schools follows a council–manager government format with a seven-member Board of Education appointing a Superintendent to run the day-to-day operations of the system. The school system currently resides in the North Carolina State Board of Education's First District.

=== Board of education ===
The seven members of the Board of Education are elected by district to staggered six-year terms, generally meeting on the first Monday of each month. The current members of the board are: Leonard E. Peace, Sr., District 4 (Chair); Brenda Dickerson-Daniel, District 2 (Vice-Chair); Toney W. Smith, District 1; B. Patrick Cox, District 3; Donnie Boyd, District 5; Catherine "Rose" Lyon, District 6; and David Richardson, District 7.

=== Superintendent ===
The superintendent of the system is Alisa McLean. She began in 2017.

== Member schools ==
Granville County Schools has 18 schools ranging from pre-kindergarten to twelfth grade. These are separated into seven high schools, one alternative school, four middle schools, and nine elementary schools.

=== High schools ===
- Center For Innovative Learning; alternative school, grades K–12 (Oxford) (Program)
- Granville Early College High School (Creedmoor)
- J. F. Webb High School (Oxford)
- South Granville High School (Creedmoor)
- Granville Academy (online and at school)

=== Middle schools ===
- Butner-Stem Middle School (Butner )(Year round and Traditional)
- Granville Central Middle School (Stem) (Formerly known as Granville Central High School)
- Northern Granville Middle School (Oxford)(Year Round and Traditional)
- Granville Academy (online and at a school)

=== Elementary schools ===
- Butner-Stem Elementary School (Butner)(Year round and Traditional)
- C. G. Credle Elementary School (Oxford)
- Mount Energy Elementary School (Creedmoor)
- Stovall-Shaw Elementary School (Stovall)
- Tar River Elementary School (Franklinton)
- West Oxford Elementary School (Oxford)(Year Round and Traditional)
- Wilton Elementary School (Franklinton)
- Granville Academy (online and at a school)

== Athletics ==
According to the North Carolina High School Athletic Association, for the 2012–2013 school year:

- Granville Central and South Granville are 2A schools in the Carolina 12 Conference.
- J. F. Webb is a 3A school in the Carolina Conference.
- The alternative and early college schools do not have athletic teams.

== Achievements and awards ==
The Granville County Schools system has one school listed as Blue Ribbon Schools: C. G. Credle Elementary School (1989–90). It has also had one teacher recognized as a North Carolina Department of Public Instruction Teacher of the Year: Louis Gotlieb for 1990–91.

== See also ==
- List of school districts in North Carolina
