= Matt Harrison (baseball) =

American baseball player (born 1985)

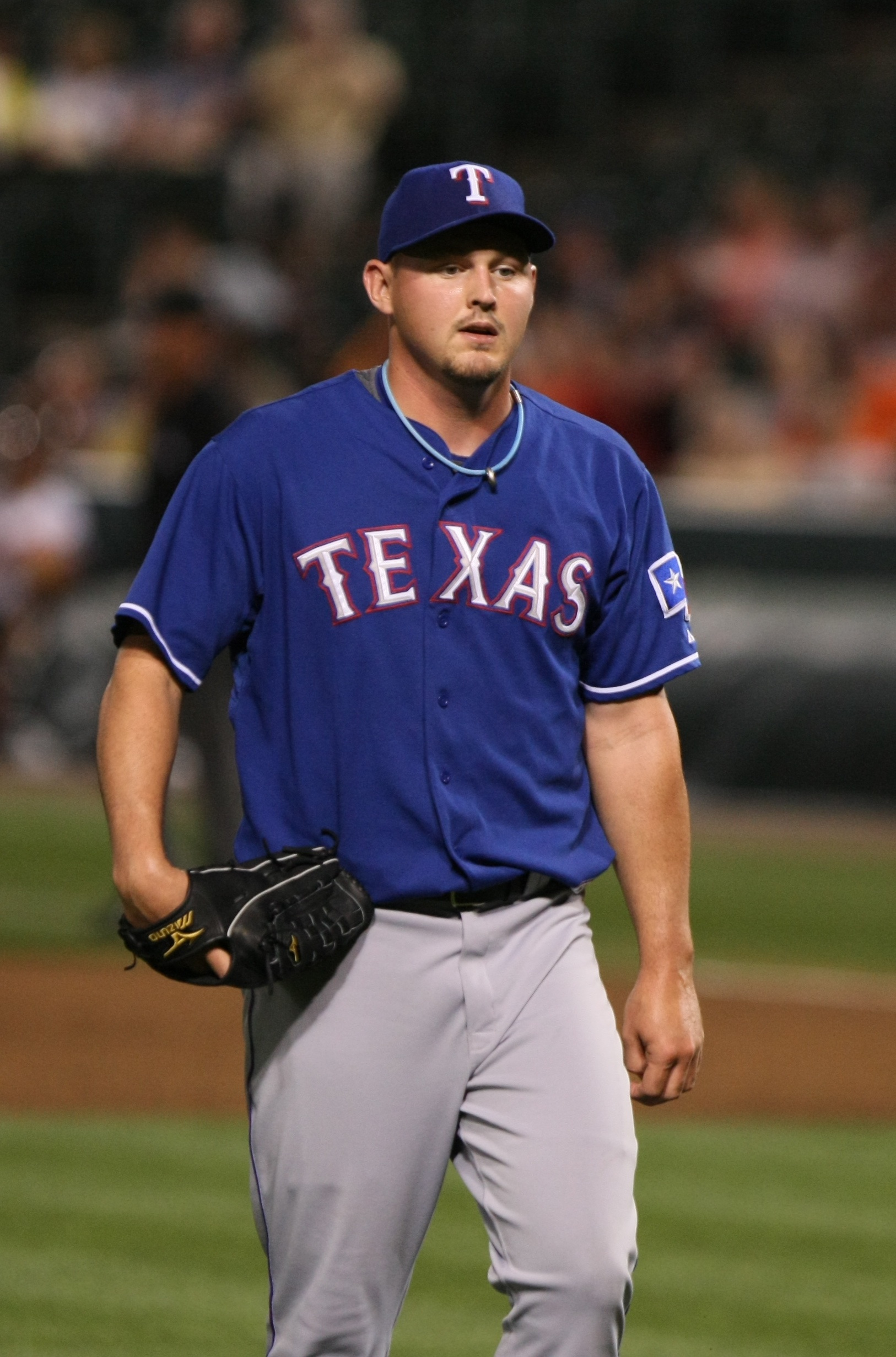
- Harrison with the Texas Rangers in 2009
- Pitcher
- Born: September 16, 1985 (age 40); Durham, North Carolina, U.S.
- Batted: Left Threw: Left

MLB debut
- July 8, 2008, for the Texas Rangers

Last MLB appearance
- July 27, 2015, for the Texas Rangers

MLB statistics
- Win–loss record: 50–35
- Earned run average: 4.21
- Strikeouts: 408
- Stats at Baseball Reference

Teams
- Texas Rangers (2008–2015)

Career highlights and awards
- All-Star (2012)

Matthew Reid Harrison (born September 16, 1985) is an American former professional baseball pitcher. He played in Major League Baseball (MLB) for the Texas Rangers from 2008 through 2015. He was an MLB All-Star in 2012.

== Early life ==
Harrison was born in Durham, North Carolina, on September 16, 1985. He attended South Granville High School in Creedmoor, North Carolina. He had signed a letter of intent to play baseball at North Carolina State University, but was drafted by the Atlanta Braves in the third round of the 2003 Major League Baseball draft and subsequently signed a professional contract.

== Professional career ==
=== Minor Leagues ===
Harrison made his professional debut with the Gulf Coast League's Gulf Coast Braves in 2003. He played in 2004 with the Danville Braves of the Appalachian League and in 2005 with the Rome Braves of the Single-A South Atlantic League. 2006 saw Harrison split time between the Single-A Myrtle Beach Pelicans of the Carolina League and the Double-A Mississippi Braves of the Southern League. He was named the Braves' Minor League Player of the Year, the Pelicans' Pitcher of the Year and was a Carolina League All-Star that season.

Entering 2007, Harrison was rated by Baseball America as the third-best prospect in the Braves organization and the seventh-best prospect in the Carolina League. He began 2007 with Double-A Mississippi, starting 20 games for the team, compiling a 5–9 record with a 3.39 ERA and 78 strikeouts. On July 30, 2007, Harrison, along with catcher Jarrod Saltalamacchia, minor league pitchers Neftalí Feliz and Beau Jones, and shortstop prospect Elvis Andrus, were traded by the Braves to the Texas Rangers for Mark Teixeira and Ron Mahay.

=== Texas Rangers (2008–2015) ===
==== 2008 ====
Harrison missed the end of the 2007 minor league regular season due to shoulder inflammation. He made his first appearance for the Rangers organization with the Surprise Rafters during the 2007 Arizona Fall League season, where he accounted for a perfect 5–0 record.

At the start of the 2008 season, Harrison was assigned to the Double-A Frisco RoughRiders of the Texas League. On May 18, he threw a no-hitter against the San Antonio Missions, only the second no-hitter in RoughRiders' history. After only nine appearances with Frisco, Harrison earned a promotion to the Triple-A Oklahoma RedHawks in June. While in Oklahoma, he went 3–1, with a 3.55 ERA in six appearances.

As the middle of the 2008 season wore on, the Rangers pitching staff suffered a number of injuries, and the team made the decision to call up Harrison from Frisco on July 8. He made his major league debut with the Rangers that day, defeating the Los Angeles Angels of Anaheim, 3–2, outdueling All-Star pitcher Joe Saunders in the process. On September 12, Harrison threw a complete-game shutout in a 7–0 road victory against the Oakland Athletics. This was the first shutout by a Rangers rookie left-hander in two decades. Harrison—one of 12 Rangers rookies to make their major league debuts in 2008—finished out the season in the majors, ending up with a 9–3 record and a 5.49 ERA.

==== 2009 ====
In 2009, Harrison was limited to 11 starts going 4–5 with a 6.11 ERA.

==== 2010 ====
In 2010, he was 3–2 with a 4.71 ERA, pitching in 37 games (6 of which he started).

With the Rangers finishing 90–72, the team made the postseason but lost to the San Francisco Giants in the 2010 World Series.

==== 2011 ====
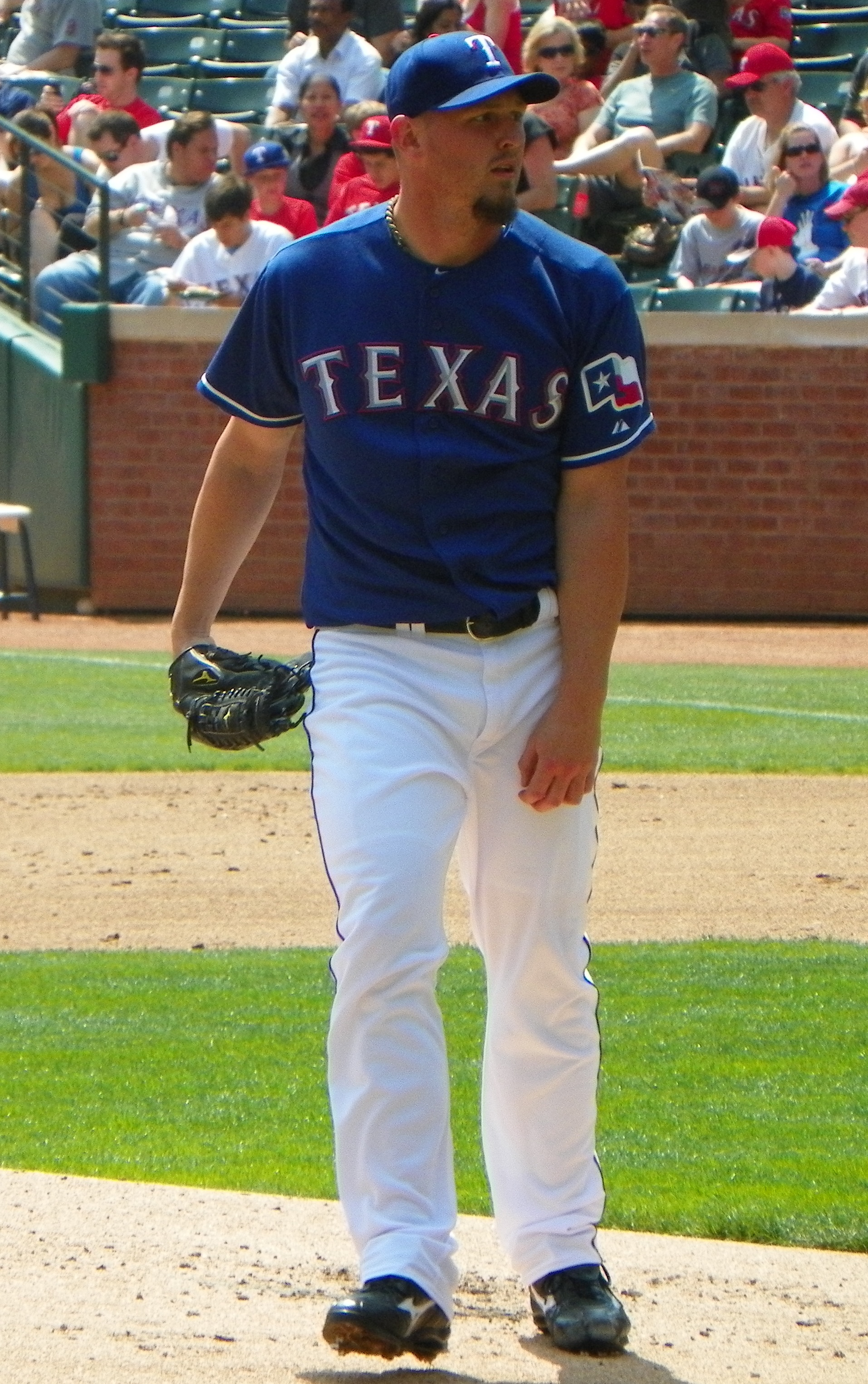
Harrison with the Rangers in 2011

Harrison was 14–9, with a 3.39 ERA in 2011. He started the game the Rangers won to clinch the AL West (Pitched 6 innings, gave up a run). Harrison won Game 4 Of the ALDS versus the Tampa Bay Rays. With that win Texas won the series and advanced to the ALCS. The Rangers lost to the St. Louis Cardinals in the 2011 World Series.

==== 2012 ====
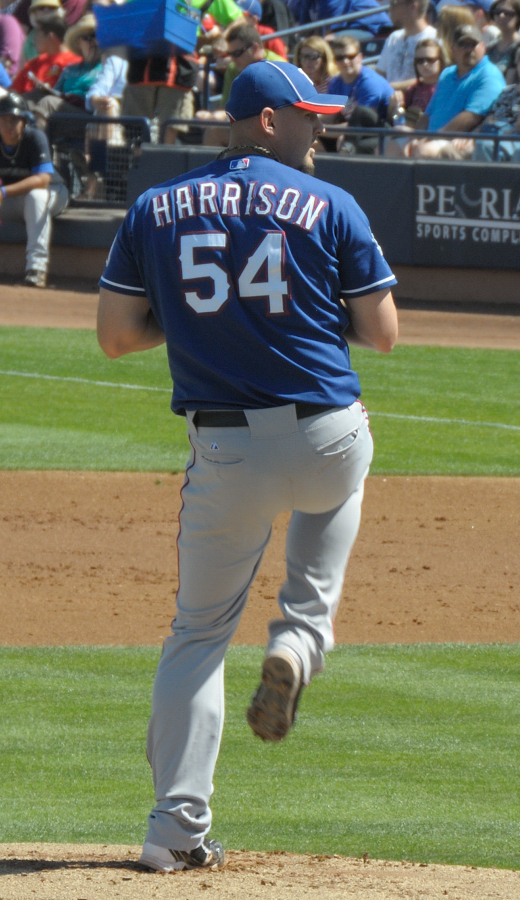
Harrison during Spring Training with the Rangers in 2012

2012 was a good year for Harrison as he earned his first career All-Star selection. He went 18–11 with a 3.29 ERA in 32 starts to lead the Rangers in wins. However, they lost in the Wild Card Game.

==== 2013 ====
2013 became a short-lived season for Harrison as he experienced back soreness. He was placed on the 15-day disabled list due to back stiffness on April 10, 2013. On April 20, 2013, Harrison underwent back surgery to repair a herniated disc. He underwent a second back surgery on May 2, 2013, which prematurely ended his season. In only 2 starts of the 2013 season, Harrison went 0–2 with an 8.44 ERA.

==== 2014 ====
During the 2014 season, Harrison made only 4 starts going 1–1 with a 4.15 ERA. On May 13, 2014, Harrison left the game with an apparent back injury, which landed him on the disabled list the following day. On June 3, 2014, Harrison underwent spinal fusion surgery to alleviate lumbar herniation in his back, which ended his season. Doctors declared that it was not safe for Harrison to continue playing baseball or any other sport, even after making a full recovery.

==== 2015 ====
Harrison started the 2015 season on the 60-day disabled list in an effort to continue recovery from his spinal fusion surgery. Sources projected that he would return by July or after the All-Star break. On July 27, during Harrison’s third appearance of the season (a start against the Yankees), he experienced more back pain, after which the Rangers elected to end his season.

=== Philadelphia Phillies ===
On July 31, 2015, Harrison was traded to the Philadelphia Phillies along with Nick Williams, Jorge Alfaro, Jake Thompson, Alec Asher, and Jerad Eickhoff in exchange for Cole Hamels and Jake Diekman. Harrison was released by the Phillies on November 15, 2016, having not thrown a single pitch for the organization. He retired during the offseason as a result of his recurring back injuries.

== Pitching style ==
Harrison threw a sinkerballer, although he used five pitches regularly. The 89–94 mph sinker was complemented by a four-seam fastball (90–94), a cutter (85–88), a curveball (77–80), and a changeup (80–83). The changeup was rarely used against left-handed hitters, as was the cutter against right-handed hitters. His changeup garnered a very effective 37% whiff rate in the first half of 2012.

== Personal life ==
Matt met his wife Meghan in 2002 while attending South Granville High School. They were married on December 13, 2008. On December 14, 2011, the couple welcomed their first child Addie Grace Harrison.
