= Mason Tobin =

American baseball player (born 1987)

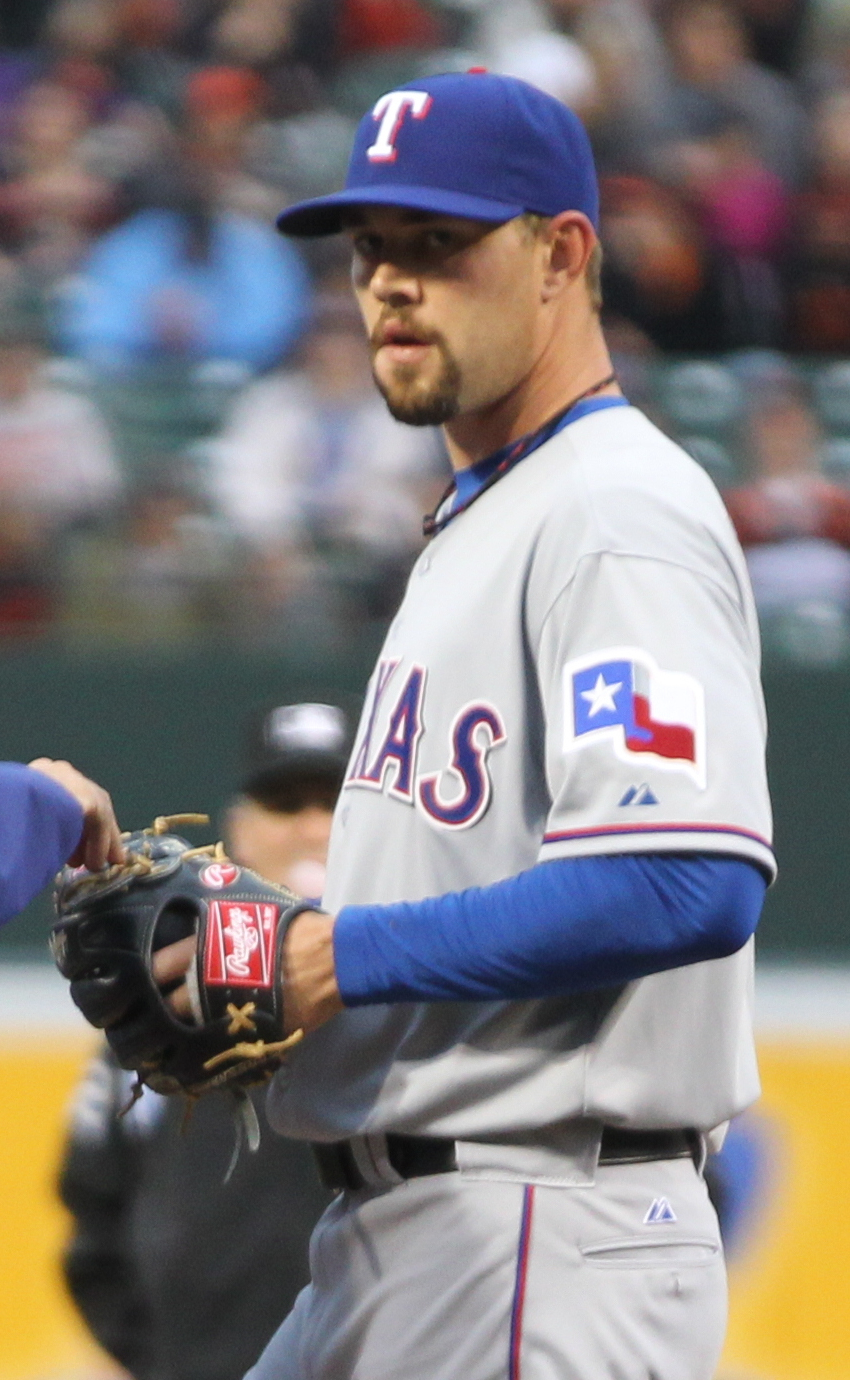
- Tobin with the Texas Rangers
- Relief Pitcher
- Born: July 8, 1987 (age 39); Glendive, Montana
- Batted: Right Threw: Right

MLB debut
- April 2, 2011, for the Texas Rangers

Last appearance
- April 19, 2011, for the Texas Rangers

MLB statistics
- Win–loss record: 0–0
- Earned run average: 6.75
- Strikeouts: 0
- Stats at Baseball Reference

Teams
- Texas Rangers (2011)

Mason Reed Tobin (born July 8, 1987) is an American former professional baseball pitcher. He played in Major League Baseball (MLB) for the Texas Rangers in 2011.

== Career ==
=== Los Angeles Angels ===
He was drafted three times - first, in the 15th round of the 2005 amateur draft by the Atlanta Braves. Next, by the Braves in the 45th round of the 2006 amateur draft, and last by the Anaheim Angels in the 16th round of the 2007 amateur draft. He was signed by scout Casey Harvie for a $125,000 bonus.

Tobin began his professional career in 2007, pitching for the Orem Owlz and AZL Angels, going a combined 4-1 with a 2.08 ERA in 14 games (13 starts). In 2008, he pitched for the Cedar Rapids Kernels, going 2-3 with a 3.13 ERA in eight starts. He pitched in only three games in 2009 (undergoing Tommy John surgery in the spring of that year), all for the Rancho Cucamonga Quakes and all relief appearances. That year, he posted a 0.00 ERA in 2 2/3 innings.

=== Chicago Cubs ===
In the 2010 Rule 5 Draft, Tobin was taken by the Chicago Cubs.

=== Texas Rangers ===
Though he did not play in 2010, the Rangers traded for him for cash considerations in December of that year. He made the team out of spring training in 2011 and made his debut in the second game of the season, coming in relief of starter Colby Lewis with a large lead against the Boston Red Sox. In one inning, he gave up 2 runs on 2 walks and a hit, that hit being Jacoby Ellsbury's first home run since 2009. He made only four appearances altogether before going on the disabled list for the remainder of the season with an injury to his pitching elbow. He made his major league debut on April 2, 2011. On April 6, 2012 the Texas Rangers announced they released Tobin from Triple-A.

=== San Francisco Giants ===
On January 10, 2013, Tobin signed a minor league contract with the San Francisco Giants.

On November 15, 2013, Tobin re-signed a minor league contract with the San Francisco Giants.

=== Second Stint with Rangers ===
On January 9, 2015, he signed a minor league contract to return to the Rangers.

== Early life ==
Tobin was born in Glendive, MT. He was drafted into the Atlanta Braves from Kentridge High School in Kent, Washington. and drafted into Los Angeles Angels of Anaheim in 2007 from Everett Community College.
