= J. F. Webb High School =

American public school in North Carolina

Location
- 3200 Webb School Rd; Oxford, North Carolina 27565; United States
- Coordinates: 36°20′16″N 78°35′49″W

Information
- School type: Public
- Established: 1964 (62 years ago)
- CEEB code: 342985
- Principal: Larry Ferebee
- Teaching staff: 36.38 (FTE)
- Grades: 9–12
- Enrollment: 549 (2023–2024)
- Student to teacher ratio: 15.09
- Colors: Red and black
- Nickname: Warriors
- Website: jfwh.gcs.k12.nc.us

J. F. Webb High School is a high school located in Oxford, North Carolina, United States. It contained one subsidiary school, the J.F. Webb School of Health & Life Sciences, which merged with J. F. Webb in 2020. It was named after J. F. Webb, a former superintendent of Granville County Schools.

== Sports ==
The Sports programs include:

- Football (Varsity)
- Basketball (Men & Women) (JV and Varsity)
- Cheerleading (JV and Varsity)
- Baseball (JV and Varsity)
- Soccer (Men & Women) (JV and Varsity)
- Wrestling
- Softball (JV and Varsity)
- Tennis (Men & Women)
- Cross Country
- Track & Field
- Lacrosse (JV and Varsity)
- Volleyball (JV and Varsity)
- Lacrosse (JV and Varsity)
- Swimming

== Notable alumni ==
- Margaret Currin, first woman United States Attorney in North Carolina
- Richard H. Moore, North Carolina State Treasurer 2001–2009
- Driicky Graham, American rapper
- Isaiah Hicks, professional basketball player
