= Neftalí Feliz =

Dominican baseball player (born 1988)

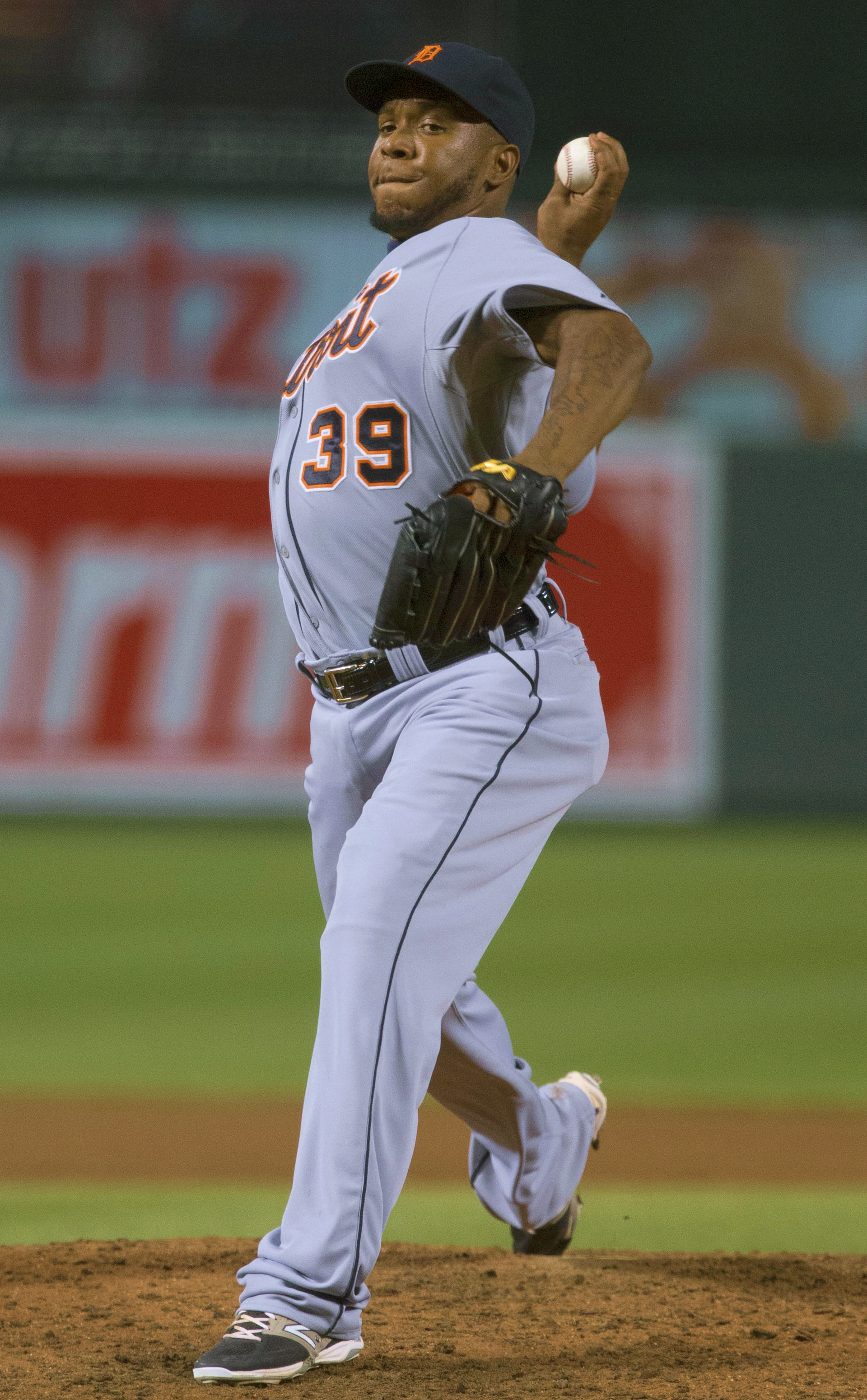
- Feliz with the Detroit Tigers in 2015

Free agent
- Pitcher
- Born: May 2, 1988 (age 38); Azua, Dominican Republic
- Bats: Right Throws: Right

MLB debut
- August 3, 2009, for the Texas Rangers

MLB statistics (through 2021 season)
- Win–loss record: 21–20
- Earned run average: 3.55
- Strikeouts: 366
- Saves: 107
- Stats at Baseball Reference

Teams
- Texas Rangers (2009–2015); Detroit Tigers (2015); Pittsburgh Pirates (2016); Milwaukee Brewers (2017); Kansas City Royals (2017); Philadelphia Phillies (2021); Los Angeles Dodgers (2021)

Career highlights and awards
- All-Star (2010); AL Rookie of the Year (2010)

Neftalí Feliz Antonio (/nɛfˈtɑːli fɛˈliːs/; born May 2, 1988) is a Dominican professional baseball pitcher who is a free agent. He has previously played in Major League Baseball (MLB) for the Texas Rangers, Detroit Tigers, Pittsburgh Pirates, Milwaukee Brewers, Kansas City Royals, Philadelphia Phillies, and Los Angeles Dodgers. Feliz won the American League Rookie of the Year Award in 2010.

== Professional career ==
=== Atlanta Braves ===
==== Minor leagues ====
Feliz was signed by the Atlanta Braves as a free agent out of the Dominican Republic on June 6, 2005. He made his professional debut with the Gulf Coast League Braves in 2006, posting a 4.03 ERA in 11 appearances. He began the 2007 season with the rookie-level Danville Braves, and logged a 1.98 ERA with 28 strikeouts in 27 1/3 innings of work.

=== Texas Rangers ===
On July 31, 2007, Feliz was traded from the Braves to the Texas Rangers along with Jarrod Saltalamacchia, Matt Harrison, Beau Jones, and Elvis Andrus in exchange for Mark Teixeira and Ron Mahay. He finished the year with the Low-A Spokane Indians, logging a 3.60 ERA in 8 games. In 2008, he split the season between the Single-A Clinton LumberKings and the Double-A Frisco RoughRiders, accumulating a 10–6 record and 2.69 ERA in 27 games with the two teams. He began the 2009 season with the Triple-A Oklahoma City RedHawks, pitching to a 4–6 record and 3.49 ERA in 25 games.

==== 2009 ====
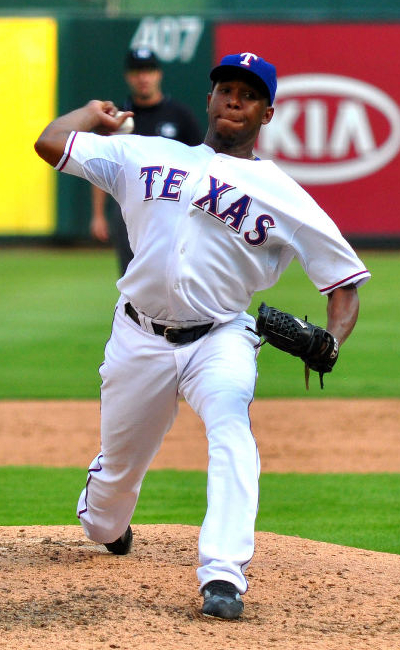
Feliz pitching for the Texas Rangers in 2009

Feliz was called up to the major leagues for the first time on August 2, 2009. He made his debut on August 3, striking out four in two scoreless innings. Feliz finished the season with a 1–0 record and a 1.74 earned run average (ERA) in 20 games, with 39 strikeouts and two saves, in 31 innings pitched.

==== 2010 ====
Feliz was the Rangers' best prospect according to Baseball America, and one of the top five pitching prospects in baseball at the start of 2010.

After two blown saves by Frank Francisco to start the 2010 baseball season, Feliz replaced him as the Rangers' closer. On July 4, 2010, he was named to his first MLB All-Star Game. He was accompanied by teammates Vladimir Guerrero, Josh Hamilton, Ian Kinsler, Elvis Andrus, and the newly acquired Cliff Lee. However, Feliz did not pitch during the game.

On September 1, 2010, Feliz threw a fastball recorded at 104.1 mph, which at one point was the third-fastest recorded pitch ever, behind Aroldis Chapman and Joel Zumaya. On September 25, 2010, he earned his 38th save of the season, breaking the single-season record for saves by a rookie. He would go on to finish the season with 40. (The previous record was held by Kazuhiro Sasaki of the Seattle Mariners, with 37 in 2000.)

During Game 6 of the 2010 American League Championship Series against the New York Yankees, Feliz got the final three outs in the ninth inning and sent the Rangers to the World Series for the first time in franchise history. On October 30, 2010, he went three up, three down to close a 4–2 Rangers win in Game 3 of the World Series, making him the second-youngest player to record a save in the World Series. The Rangers lost the World Series to the San Francisco Giants in five games.

On November 15, 2010, Feliz was awarded the 2010 American League Rookie of the Year Award. He was also named the closer on Baseball America's 2010 All-Rookie Team and the Topps Major League Rookie All-Star Team.

==== 2011 ====
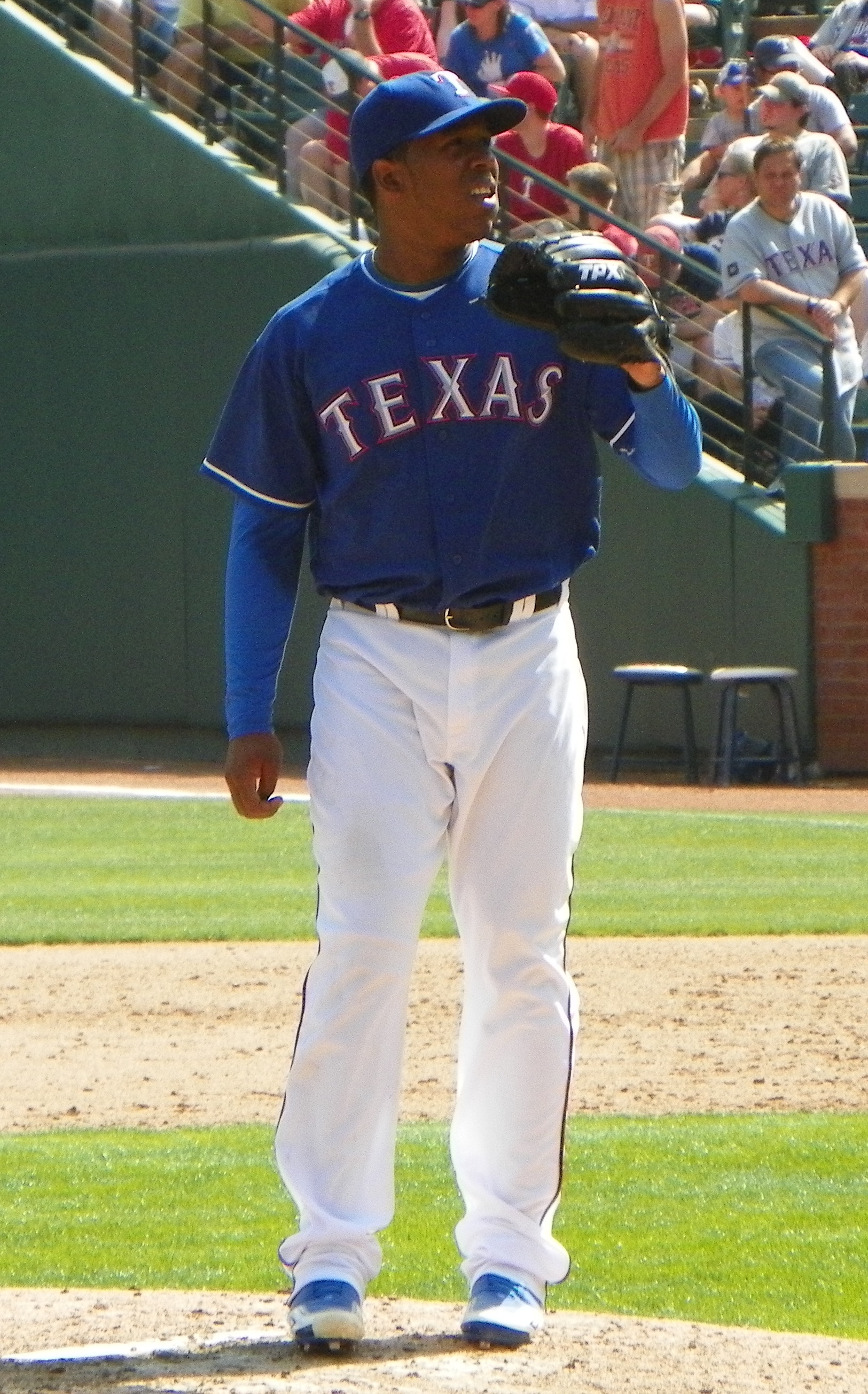
Feliz with the Rangers in 2011

In 2011, Feliz was 2–3 with a 2.74 ERA and 32 saves (5th in the American League and tied for 9th-most in Rangers history). During Game 6 of the 2011 World Series, with two outs, two strikes, and two runners on, Feliz blew a save as he surrendered a two-run triple to David Freese, who would then homer later to seal a Cardinals 10–9 win in the 11th inning. The Rangers then lost their second straight World Series after losing Game 7 to the Cardinals 6–2.

==== 2012 ====
With the addition of veteran closer Joe Nathan, the Rangers transitioned Feliz into the starting rotation for the 2012 season. His first start came on April 10 against the Seattle Mariners. He pitched 7 shutout innings, only giving up 4 hits and 2 walks with 4 strikeouts in a 1–0 victory. On May 21, 2012, Feliz was placed on the 60-day disabled list (DL) due to a sprained ulnar collateral ligament. After several rehab appearances, Feliz underwent Tommy John surgery on August 1, 2012. In 8 games (7 starts), he went 3–1 with a 3.16 ERA during his injury-shortened 2012 year.

==== 2013 ====
Feliz began the 2013 season on the 60-day DL, still recovering from Tommy John surgery. On September 1, he was activated from the DL with the intention to use him in low-leverage situations. He pitched later that night in a lost cause to the Minnesota Twins, pitching 1 2/3 innings of relief. Feliz finished the season with only six appearances in which he did not give up a run and struck-out four.

==== 2014 ====
Feliz opened the season as the Rangers setup man. He became the closer again after Joakim Soria was traded. He saved 13 games by the end of the season for the Rangers despite only appearing in 30 games due to injury.

==== 2015 ====
Feliz was designated for assignment on July 3, 2015, after posting underwhelming stats and being on the DL for the third straight season. He was outrighted off the roster on July 9 and elected to become a free agent.

=== Detroit Tigers ===
On July 11, 2015, Feliz signed a one-year contract with the Detroit Tigers. He made his debut for the Tigers that day, pitching a scoreless ninth inning, allowing one hit and one strikeout. After the season, on December 2, he was non-tendered, making him a free agent.

=== Pittsburgh Pirates ===
On January 6, 2016, Feliz signed a one-year, $3.9 million contract with the Pittsburgh Pirates. Feliz appeared in 62 contests for the Pirates, pitching to a 4–2 record and 3.52 ERA with 61 strikeouts in 53 2/3 innings of work. He became a free agent after the season.

=== Milwaukee Brewers ===
On January 19, 2017, Feliz signed a one-year contract with the Milwaukee Brewers. Feliz was designated for assignment on June 14 after struggling to a 1–5 record and 6.00 ERA in 29 appearances. The Brewers released him on June 19.

=== Kansas City Royals ===
On June 22, 2017, Feliz signed a major league contract with the Kansas City Royals. Feliz posted a 4.74 ERA in 20 games before being released by Kansas City on September 1.

=== Arizona Diamondbacks ===
On January 28, 2018, Feliz signed a minor league deal with the Arizona Diamondbacks. He spent the season with the Diamondbacks' Triple-A affiliate, the Reno Aces, where he posted a 6–5 record and 4.81 ERA in 37 games with the team. He elected free agency following the season on November 2.

=== Seattle Mariners ===
On April 10, 2019, Feliz signed a minor league deal with the Seattle Mariners. However, Feliz never appeared in a game for the organization, and spent the 2019 and 2020 seasons out of affiliated baseball.

=== Philadelphia Phillies ===
On December 17, 2020, Feliz signed a minor league contract with the Philadelphia Phillies. He was assigned to the Triple-A Lehigh Valley IronPigs to begin the 2021 season, where he recorded a 2–1 record and 1.26 ERA in 15 games. On June 25, 2021, Feliz was selected to the active roster. On July 1, Feliz was designated for assignment by the Phillies after struggling to a 36.00 ERA across 2 appearances. On July 3, Feliz elected free agency.

=== Los Angeles Dodgers ===
On July 6, 2021, Feliz signed a minor league contract with the Los Angeles Dodgers organization. He was assigned to the Triple-A Oklahoma City Dodgers and was later added to the major league roster on August 16. He pitched one scoreless inning for the Dodgers on August 22 before he was designated for assignment two days later. On August 27, Feliz cleared waivers and was assigned outright to Triple-A. He was called back up to the majors on September 6. He pitched in two more games, on September 7 and 8, pitching two scoreless innings before he was again designated for assignment on September 9 and then outrighted to Triple-A on September 11. In Triple-A, he pitched 26 2/3 innings over 20 games with a 4.73 ERA. On October 14, Feliz elected free agency.

=== Sultanes de Monterrey ===
On March 7, 2022, Feliz signed with the Sultanes de Monterrey of the Mexican League. Feliz made 41 appearances for Monterrey, working to a 4–2 record and 2.89 ERA with 51 strikeouts and 24 saves in 43 2/3 innings pitched. On February 17, 2023, Feliz was released by the Sultanes.

=== Caliente de Durango ===
On November 23, 2023, Feliz signed with the Caliente de Durango of the Mexican League. Operating as the team's closer, he posted a 3–0 record with a 1.38 ERA and 11 saves across 26 innings pitched to start the 2024 season.

=== Leones de Yucatán ===
On July 5, 2024, Feliz was traded to the Leones de Yucatán of the Mexican League for the rights to infielder Lázaro Alonso and pitcher Jesús Chávez. In 9 games for Yucatán, he had an 0–1 record and 1.93 ERA with 7 strikeouts and 6 saves across 9 1/3 innings pitched.

=== Caliente de Durango (second stint) ===
On September 20, 2024, Feliz was traded back to the Caliente de Durango alongside Félix Doubront.

On December 13, 2024, Feliz signed a minor league contract with the Seattle Mariners. The team released him on March 14, 2025, prior to the start of the regular season.

On April 17, 2025, Feliz re-signed with Durango. He made one scoreless appearance for Durango, recording a strikeout against the only batter he faced. Feliz was released by the Caliente on May 15.

On February 13, 2026, Feliz signed with the Saraperos de Saltillo of the Mexican League. However, he failed to make the Opening Day roster and was released prior to the start of the season on April 14.

=== Piratas de Campeche ===
On May 5, 2026, Feliz signed with the Piratas de Campeche of the Mexican League. In five appearances, he gave up eight earned runs over three innings pitched, while striking out four and walking seven batters. On May 19, Feliz was released by Campeche.
