= 2011 Baltimore Orioles season =

Major League Baseball season

2011 Baltimore Orioles
- League: American League
- Division: East
- Ballpark: Oriole Park at Camden Yards
- City: Baltimore, Maryland
- Record: 69–93 (.426)
- Divisional place: 5th
- Owners: Peter Angelos
- General managers: Andy MacPhail
- Managers: Buck Showalter
- Television: MASN; WJZ-TV (CBS 13) (Gary Thorne, Jim Palmer, Mike Flanagan, Jim Hunter)
- Radio: Baltimore Orioles Radio Network (Joe Angel, Fred Manfra)

The Baltimore Orioles' 2011 season was the 111th season in franchise history, the 58th in Baltimore, and the 20th at Oriole Park at Camden Yards. It also marked the last year of a streak of fourteen consecutive losing seasons dating back to 1998.

== Offseason ==
The 2010–11 offseason has been notable for the Orioles, featuring a complete makeover of their infield, with only Brian Roberts expected to reprise his starting role. On December 6, 2010, the Orioles completed a trade with the Arizona Diamondbacks for third basemen Mark Reynolds, in exchange for relief pitchers David Hernandez and Kam Mickolio. The next day, the Orioles lost corner infielder, second baseman (40 games in 2010), and lone 2010 All-Star representative Ty Wigginton when he signed with the Colorado Rockies. On December 9, however, a deal was struck with the Minnesota Twins, acquiring shortstop J. J. Hardy, utility infielder Brendan Harris and cash in exchange for minor league pitchers Jim Hoey and Brett Jacobson. The following day, the Orioles re-signed former starting shortstop César Izturis, though now as a utility middle infielder. Finally, after weeks of rumor and speculation, concerning possible first base signings, the Orioles inked veteran free agent Derrek Lee on January 6, 2011.

The Orioles also worked to stabilize their bullpen whose depth had been weakened in trades to strengthen the infield. They began on December 13 by re-signing former starter and de facto closer Koji Uehara. The following day, the Orioles signed former Toronto Blue Jays reliever Jeremy Accardo. A month later on January 13, the Orioles signed former Blue Jays closer Kevin Gregg. Though still on the 40-man roster, the Orioles may have lost reliever Alfredo Simón, as he was charged with involuntary manslaughter in the Dominican Republic, following an accidental shooting death of his cousin during a New Year's celebration.

In addition to shoring up their bullpen, the Orioles signed Justin Duchscherer to a one-year deal.

On February 4, the Orioles signed free agent Vladimir Guerrero to solidify the offense. Guerrero had hit for 29 home runs and a .300 average in the 2010 season with the Texas Rangers. He also had a career average of .320 and 436 home runs prior to the 2011 season.

== Regular season ==
The team started the season 4–0, the first time since the 1997 baseball season.

The Orioles eliminated the Boston Red Sox from the playoff on the final day of the season, the last of their five victories over the Red Sox in September. The Orioles were 15–13 in September, including two extra-inning wins over the division champion New York Yankees and another two wins against the AL wild card Tampa Bay Rays on September 13–14. They also stopped division champion Detroit Tigers's Justin Verlander attempt at 25 wins, beating the Tigers 6–5 while scoring five runs in Verlander's seven innings.

=== Roster ===
2011 Baltimore Orioles
Roster
Pitchers: 37 Jeremy Accardo; 34 Jake Arrieta; 39 Mitch Atkins; 35 Brad Bergesen; 49 Jason Berken; 53 Zach Britton; 50 Willie Eyre; 51 Mike Gonzalez; 63 Kevin Gregg; 46 Jeremy Guthrie; 31 Mark Hendrickson; 39 Tommy Hunter; 55,36 Chris Jakubauskas; 43 Jim Johnson; 17 Brian Matusz; 40 Troy Patton; 58 Zach Phillips; 57 Clay Rapada; 45 Jo-Jo Reyes; 59 Josh Rupe; 55 Alfredo Simón; 64 Pedro Strop; 24 Chris Tillman; 19 Koji Uehara; 54 Rick Vanden Hurk; 47 Pedro Viola; 52 Mark Worrell	Catchers: 9 Jake Fox; 15 Craig Tatum; 32 Matt Wieters; Infielders: 6 Ryan Adams; 11 Robert Andino; 50,25 Josh Bell; 28 Blake Davis; 19 Chris Davis; 61 Pedro Florimón, Jr.; 2 J. J. Hardy; 3 César Izturis; 25 Derrek Lee; 12 Mark Reynolds; 1 Brian Roberts; 29 Brandon Snyder	Outfielders: 38 Matt Angle; 51 Kyle Hudson; 10 Adam Jones; 21 Nick Markakis; 18 Félix Pie; 14 Nolan Reimold; 30 Luke Scott; Other batters: 27 Vladimir Guerrero	Manager: 26 Buck Showalter; Coaches: 41 Rick Adair (bullpen)(pitching); 62 Rudy Árias (bullpen catcher); 52 Mark Connor (pitching); 94 Bobby Dickerson (bullpen); 23 Wayne Kirby (first base); 16 Jim Presley (hitting); 13 Willie Randolph (third base); 77 John Russell (bench)

=== Season standings ===
==== American League East ====
AL East
Team	W	L	Pct.	GB	Home	Road
New York Yankees	97	65	.599	—	52‍–‍29	45‍–‍36
Tampa Bay Rays	91	71	.562	6	47‍–‍34	44‍–‍37
Boston Red Sox	90	72	.556	7	45‍–‍36	45‍–‍36
Toronto Blue Jays	81	81	.500	16	42‍–‍39	39‍–‍42
Baltimore Orioles	69	93	.426	28	39‍–‍42	30‍–‍51

==== American League Wild Card ====
Division winners
Team	W	L	Pct.
New York Yankees	97	65	.599
Texas Rangers	96	66	.593
Detroit Tigers	95	67	.586

Wild Card team (Top team qualifies for postseason)
Team	W	L	Pct.	GB
Tampa Bay Rays	91	71	.562	—
Boston Red Sox	90	72	.556	1
Los Angeles Angels of Anaheim	86	76	.531	5
Toronto Blue Jays	81	81	.500	10
Cleveland Indians	80	82	.494	11
Chicago White Sox	79	83	.488	12
Oakland Athletics	74	88	.457	17
Kansas City Royals	71	91	.438	20
Baltimore Orioles	69	93	.426	22
Seattle Mariners	67	95	.414	24
Minnesota Twins	63	99	.389	28

=== Record vs. opponents ===
2011 American League record Source: MLB Standings Grid – 2011
Team	BAL	BOS	CWS	CLE	DET	KC	LAA	MIN	NYY	OAK	SEA	TB	TEX	TOR	NL
Baltimore	–	8–10	4–4	2–5	5–5	5–4	3–6	6–2	5–13	4–5	4–2	9–9	1–5	6–12	7–11
Boston	10–8	–	2–4	4–6	5–1	5–3	6–2	5–2	12–6	6–2	5–4	6–12	4–6	10–8	10–8
Chicago	4–4	4–2	–	11–7	5–13	7–11	2–6	9–9	2–6	6–4	7–2	4–4	4–4	3–4	11–7
Cleveland	5–2	6–4	7–11	–	6–12	12–6	3–6	11–7	3–4	5–2	5–4	2–4	1–9	3–4	11–7
Detroit	5–5	1–5	13–5	12–6	–	11–7	3–4	14–4	4–3	5–5	4–6	6–1	6–3	4–2	7–11
Kansas City	4–5	3–5	11–7	6–12	7–11	–	7–3	8–10	3–3	4–5	5–3	2–5	2–6	4–3	5–13
Los Angeles	6–3	2–6	6–2	6–3	4–3	3–7	–	6–3	4–5	8–11	12–7	4–4	7–12	5–5	13–5
Minnesota	2–6	2–5	9–9	7–11	4–14	10–8	3–6	–	2–6	4–4	3–5	3–7	5–3	1–5	8–10
New York	13–5	6–12	6–2	4–3	3–4	3–3	5–4	6–2	–	6–3	5–4	9–9	7–2	11–7	13–5
Oakland	5–4	2–6	4–6	2–5	5–5	5–4	11–8	4–4	3–6	–	9–10	5–2	6–13	5–5	8–10
Seattle	2–4	4–5	2–7	4–5	6–4	3–5	7–12	5–3	4–5	10–9	–	4–6	4–15	3–6	9–9
Tampa Bay	9–9	12–6	4–4	4–2	1–6	5–2	4–4	7–3	9–9	2–5	6–4	–	4–5	12–6	12–6
Texas	5–1	6–4	4–4	9–1	3–6	6–2	12–7	3–5	2–7	13–6	15–4	5–4	–	4–6	9–9
Toronto	12–6	8–10	4–3	4–3	2–4	3–4	5–5	5–1	7–11	5–5	6–3	6–12	6–4	–	8–10

- Source: MLB Standings Grid – 2011

== September 28 -- Game 162 ==
Despite being in last place in the division (29 games out and with a 68–93 record), the Baltimore Orioles were a part of what is famously touted in Major League Baseball lore as the "Best Night Ever" in baseball with the AL and NL wild cards still tied and were up for grabs. The Orioles had gone 4–2 down the stretch vs. Boston with game 162 still left to play in Baltimore. The game was broadcast on ESPN as well as the MASN and NESN networks. The Orioles were aiming to play the role of spoiler and end the Red Sox season with help from the Tampa Bay Rays.

In the AL wild card race, The Boston Red Sox were suffering through a 7-19 stretch in which they had blown a nine-game lead on August 30 (which gave them more than a 99.7% chance of making the playoffs). This was a do-or-die game for the Red Sox, but felt they had a lot of momentum going into this game having beaten the Orioles, 8–7, the night before.

The Orioles sent Alfredo Simón, who had a history of success vs. Boston against Jon Lester, who was 14-0 lifetime with a 3.26 ERA against the Baltimore Orioles. The scoring got started with Dustin Pedroia getting a single to score Mike Avilés to give the Red Sox a 1–0 lead. However, the Orioles struck back in the bottom of the 3rd as J. J. Hardy, laced his 30th home run of the season into left field to give the O's a 2–1 advantage. In the top of the 4th with Marco Scutaro at 3rd base, a controversial balk call was made on Alfredo Simón which tied up the game at two apiece. The bottom of the 4th went by one-two-three for the O's. In the top of the 5th, Dustin Pedroia hit a one-out solo home run to give the Red Sox back the lead, 3–2. At the start of the bottom of the 7th, the game was delayed for 85 minutes because of some heavy thunderstorms that moved through the area. In the top of the 8th, Marco Scutaro had singled to right and was on as a hopeful insurance run to boost the Red Sox lead. Carl Crawford then picked up a double after Nolan Reimold mistimed his jump to make the catch and Adam Jones fired the ball to catcher Matt Wieters to get Scutaro out. Mike Avilés fouled out and the inning ended.

In the bottom of the 9th inning, the Boston Red Sox sported a 77–0 record when leading after the 8th inning and the O's were down 3–2 to the Red Sox versus top closer Jonathan Papelbon, Chris Davis laced a double to the garage door in right field to put him on 2nd base. The next batter was Nolan Reimold (who hit pretty well against Boston pitching) and on a 2-2 count, Reimold laced a drive into the gap in right center field which one hopped the warning track over the wall for a ground rule double. The next batter following with Reimold on 2nd base was Robert Andino. Andino had success against the Red Sox as he hit .300 versus their pitching and was having an excellent series. Andino laced the 1-1 pitch towards Carl Crawford who was playing a bit too far deep and slid and trapped the ball. Reimold made a mad dash towards home. After Reimold slid to score the winning run, he and Andino were mobbed by their teammates, as they knew that they had just eliminated the Red Sox.

The Orioles' win broke ESPN's viewership record for a Wednesday Night game bringing in a 1.6 rating, 1.546M household impressions, and 2.116M viewers. It also broke Major League Baseball's record for internet traffic in one day. The game itself made national headlines as well the next morning on Headline News, CNN, Fox News, and many other international news media outlets.

=== Calls from the game ===
Here's the 1-1 delivery...That is into left field, anddddddddd...NO, IT'S TRAPPED! THE ORIOLES COMING TO THE PLATE, REIMOLD! THEY DID IT! THEY DID IT! THEY DID IT! THE ORIOLES HAVE BEATEN THE RED SOX! TWO RUNS! BOTTOM OF THE NINTH INNING!

— Gary Thorne on MASN.

The chance to end the season with a walk-off... Here comes the 1-1 delivery... Andino... LINE DRIVE! Into left, Crawford coming on! He trapped it! HERE COMES REIMOLD! HERE COMES THE THROW! IT IS TOO LATE! AND THE ORIOLES HAVE WON THE GAME! In the bottom of the Ninth inning! And they're going crazy! They are belting each other! They're jumping on each other! And right now it looks as though the Orioles had won the pennant! But all they did was possibly eliminate the Boston Red Sox.

— Joe Angel on WBAL-AM.

== Game log ==
Legend
Orioles Win	Orioles Loss	Game postponed

2011 Game Log
April (12–13)

#	Date	Opponent	Score	Win	Loss	Save	Attendance	Record
1	April 1	@ Rays	4–1	Guthrie (1–0)	Price (0–1)		34,078	1–0
2	April 2	@ Rays	3–1	Accardo (1–0)	Shields (0–1)	Gregg (1)	22,164	2–0
3	April 3	@ Rays	5–1	Britton (1–0)	Davis (0–1)		17,408	3–0
4	April 4	Tigers	5–1	Arrieta (1–0)	Porcello (0–1)		46,593	4–0
5	April 6	Tigers	3–7	Verlander (1–0)	Bergesen (0–1)		12,451	4–1
6	April 7	Tigers	9–5	Johnson (1–0)	Thomas (0–1)		11,648	5–1
–	April 8	Rangers	Postponed (rain); Makeup: April 9 as part of a doubleheader					
7	April 9	Rangers	5–0	Britton (2–0)	Lewis (0–1)		—	6–1
8	April 9	Rangers	1–13	Harrison (2–0)	Arrieta (1–1)		36,243	6–2
9	April 10	Rangers	0–3	Holland (2–0)	Guthrie (1–1)	Feliz (3)	21,452	6–3
–	April 12	@ Yankees	Postponed (rain); Makeup: July 30 as part of a doubleheader					
10	April 13	@ Yankees	4–7	Burnett (3–0)	Tillman (0–1)	Rivera (5)	42,171	6–4
11	April 14	@ Yankees	5–6 (10)	Rivera (1–0)	Gonzalez (0–1)		40,517	6–5
12	April 15	@ Indians	2–8	Masterson (3–0)	Britton (2–1)		16,346	6–6
13	April 16	@ Indians	3–8	Tomlin (3–0)	Guthrie (1–2)		10,714	6–7
14	April 17	@ Indians	2–4	Carmona (1–2)	Bergesen (0–2)	Perez (5)	13,017	6–8
15	April 18	Twins	3–5	Liriano (1–3)	Tillman (0–2)	Capps (2)	13,138	6–9
16	April 19	Twins	11–0	Arrieta (2–1)	Pavano (1–2)		12,045	7–9
17	April 20	Twins	5–4	Britton (3–1)	Blackburn (1–3)	Gregg (2)	13,825	8–9
18	April 21	Twins	1–3	Baker (1–2)	Guthrie (1–3)	Capps (3)	16,769	8–10
–	April 22	Yankees	Postponed (rain); Makeup: August 27 as part of a doubleheader					
19	April 23	Yankees	3–15	Sabathia (1–1)	Bergesen (0–3)		39,054	8–11
20	April 24	Yankees	3–6 (11)	Logan (1–1)	Berken (0–1)		25,051	8–12
21	April 26	Red Sox	4–1	Britton (4–1)	Buchholz (1–3)	Gregg (3)	18,938	9–12
22	April 27	Red Sox	5–4	Uehara (1–0)	Bard (0–3)	Gregg (4)	15,514	10–12
23	April 28	Red Sox	2–6	Lester (3–1)	Johnson (1–1)		21,209	10–13
24	April 29	@ White Sox	10–4	Arrieta (3–1)	Danks (0–4)		21,816	11–13
25	April 30	@ White Sox	6–2	Tillman (1–2)	Humber (2–3)		26,104	12–13

May (12–16)

#	Date	Opponent	Score	Win	Loss	Save	Attendance	Record
26	May 1	@ White Sox	6–4	Britton (5–1)	Floyd (3–2)	Gregg (5)	22,029	13–13
27	May 2	@ White Sox	2–6	Buehrle (2–3)	Guthrie (1–4)	Santos (3)	18,007	13–14
28	May 3	@ Royals	5–6	Collins (2–1)	Berken (0–2)		11,986	13–15
29	May 4	@ Royals	3–2	Arrieta (4–1)	Davies (1–4)	Gregg (6)	11,130	14–15
30	May 5	@ Royals	1–9	Chen (4–1)	Tillman (1–3)		29,927	14–16
31	May 6	Rays	2–6	Shields (3–1)	Britton (5–2)		20,694	14–17
32	May 7	Rays	2–8	Hellickson (3–2)	Guthrie (1–5)		18,961	14–18
33	May 8	Rays	3–5	Davis (4–2)	Bergesen (0–4)	Farnsworth (7)	16,359	14–19
34	May 10	Mariners	7–6 (13)	Accardo (2–0)	League (0–2)		11,485	15–19
35	May 11	Mariners	4–2	Tillman (2–3)	F. Hernández (4–3)	Gregg (7)	11,561	16–19
36	May 12	Mariners	2–1 (12)	Johnson (2–1)	League (0–3)		19,082	17–19
37	May 13	@ Rays	0–3	Hellickson (4–2)	Guthrie (1–6)		20,476	17–20
38	May 14	@ Rays	6–0	Bergesen (1–4)	Davis (4–3)		28,451	18–20
39	May 15	@ Rays	9–3	Arrieta (5–1)	Sonnanstine (0–1)		21,505	19–20
40	May 16	@ Red Sox	7–8	Aceves (1–0)	Gregg (0–1)		37,138	19–21
–	May 17	@ Red Sox	Postponed (rain); Makeup: September 19 as part of a doubleheader					
41	May 18	Yankees	1–4 (15)	Noesí (1–0)	Accardo (2–1)		20,589	19–22
42	May 19	Yankees	2–13	Sabathia (4–3)	Bergesen (1–5)		24,939	19–23
43	May 20	Nationals	5–17	Rodriguez (1–0)	Arrieta (5–2)		24,442	19–24
44	May 21	Nationals	8–3	Guthrie (2–6)	Lannan (2–5)		33,107	20–24
45	May 22	Nationals	2–1	Johnson (3–1)	Zimmermann (2–5)	Gregg (8)	33,626	21–24
46	May 24	Royals	5–3	Simón (1–0)	Soria (3–1)		14,077	22–24
47	May 25	Royals	9–2	Arrieta (6–2)	Hochevar (3–5)		15,740	23–24
48	May 26	Royals	6–5 (12)	Accardo (3–1)	Coleman (0–2)		22,720	24–24
49	May 27	@ Athletics	2–6	Ziegler (1–0)	Simón (1–1)		12,110	24–25
50	May 28	@ Athletics	2–4	Outman (1–0)	Bergesen (1–6)	Fuentes (10)	23,795	24–26
51	May 29	@ Athletics	4–6	Moscoso (2–0)	Britton (5–3)	Fuentes (11)	15,373	24–27
52	May 30	@ Mariners	3–4	Fister (3–5)	Arrieta (6–3)	League (14)	22,819	24–28
53	May 31	@ Mariners	2–3	Ray (2–1)	Guthrie (2–7)	League (15)	11,692	24–29

June (11–14)

#	Date	Opponent	Score	Win	Loss	Save	Attendance	Record
54	June 1	@ Mariners	2–1	Johnson (4–1)	Wright (1–2)	Gregg (9)	18,036	25–29
55	June 3	Blue Jays	4–8	Villanueva (3–0)	Britton (5–4)		18,587	25–30
56	June 4	Blue Jays	5–3	Arrieta (7–3)	Romero (5–5)	Gregg (10)	20,086	26–30
57	June 5	Blue Jays	4–7	Reyes (2–4)	Guthrie (2–8)		25,431	26–31
58	June 6	Athletics	4–2	Matusz (1–0)	Gonzalez (5–4)	Gregg (11)	10,556	27–31
59	June 7	Athletics	4–0	Jakubauskas (1–0)	Moscoso (2–2)		13,652	28–31
60	June 8	Athletics	3–2	Britton (6–4)	Outman (1–1)	Gregg (12)	11,760	29–31
61	June 10	Rays	7–0	Arrieta (8–3)	Hellickson (7–4)		17,900	30–31
62	June 11	Rays	5–7 (11)	Cruz (4–0)	Accardo (3–2)	Farnsworth (14)	25,541	30–32
63	June 12	Rays	6–9	Davis (5–5)	Matusz (1–1)	Howell (1)	22,032	30–33
64	June 14	@ Blue Jays	5–6 (11)	Camp (1–1)	Uehara (1–1)		15,592	30–34
65	June 15	@ Blue Jays	1–4	Romero (6–6)	Arrieta (8–4)	Francisco (6)	14,541	30–35
66	June 16	@ Blue Jays	4–3	Berken (1–2)	Rauch (2–3)	Gregg (13)	31,822	31–35
67	June 17	@ Nationals	4–8	Burnett (3–3)	Accardo (3–3)		35,562	31–36
68	June 18	@ Nationals	2–4	Zimmermann (5–6)	Matusz (1–2)	Storen (17)	36,614	31–37
69	June 19	@ Nationals	7–4	Jakubauskas (2–0)	Gorzelanny (2–5)		35,439	32–37
70	June 20	@ Pirates	8–3	Arrieta (9–4)	Morton (7–4)		22,447	33–37
71	June 21	@ Pirates	3–9	Resop (3–2)	Guthrie (2–9)		33,806	33–38
72	June 22	@ Pirates	4–5	Correia (9–6)	Britton (6–5)	Hanrahan (20)	19,418	33–39
73	June 24	Reds	5–4 (12)	Gonzalez (1–1)	Arredondo (0–3)		45,382	34–39
74	June 25	Reds	5–10	Arroyo (7–6)	Matusz (1–3)		38,976	34–40
75	June 26	Reds	7–5	Guthrie (3–9)	Bailey (3–2)	Gregg (14)	27,809	35–40
76	June 28	Cardinals	2–6	Lohse (8–4)	Britton (6–6)		20,556	35–41
77	June 29	Cardinals	1–5	Carpenter (3–7)	Jakubauskas (2–1)		17,405	35–42
78	June 30	Cardinals	6–9	García (7–3)	Matusz (1–4)	Salas (13)	28,340	35–43

July (7–20)

#	Date	Opponent	Score	Win	Loss	Save	Attendance	Record
79	July 1	@ Braves	0–4	Jurrjens (11–3)	Guthrie (3–10)		33,261	35–44
80	July 2	@ Braves	4–5	Hudson (7–6)	Arrieta (9–5)	Kimbrel (24)	37,259	35–45
81	July 3	@ Braves	5–4	Johnson (5–1)	Proctor (1–2)	Gregg (15)	23,492	36–45
82	July 4	@ Rangers	4–13	Lewis (8–7)	Jakubauskas (2–2)		42,885	36–46
83	July 5	@ Rangers	2–4	Hunter (1–0)	Johnson (5–2)	Feliz (17)	25,945	36–47
84	July 6	@ Rangers	5–13	Ogando (9–3)	Guthrie (3–11)		31,953	36–48
85	July 7	@ Red Sox	4–10	Miller (3–0)	Arrieta (9–6)		37,981	36–49
86	July 8	@ Red Sox	3–10	Beckett (8–3)	Britton (6–7)		37,729	36–50
87	July 9	@ Red Sox	0–4	Lackey (6–8)	Simón (1–2)		38,205	36–51
88	July 10	@ Red Sox	6–8	Aceves (4–1)	Guthrie (3–12)	Papelbon (20)	37,688	36–52
89	July 14	Indians	4–8	Masterson (8–6)	Guthrie (3–13)		22,780	36–53
90	July 15	Indians	5–6	Tomlin (11–4)	Johnson (5–3)	Perez (22)	27,352	36–54
91	July 16	Indians	6–5	Simón (2–2)	Carrasco (8–7)	Gonzalez (1)	24,835	37–54
92	July 17	Indians	8–3	Hendrickson (1–0)	Gómez (0–2)		17,754	38–54
93	July 18	Red Sox	10–15	Wheeler (2–1)	Gonzalez (1–2)		27,924	38–55
94	July 19	Red Sox	6–2	Guthrie (4–13)	Weiland (0–1)	Johnson (1)	32,314	39–55
95	July 20	Red Sox	0–4	Miller (4–1)	Arrieta (9–7)		35,174	39–56
96	July 22	Angels	1–6	Santana (5–8)	Simón (2–3)	Takahashi (1)	24,823	39–57
97	July 23	Angels	3–2	Bergesen (2–6)	Piñeiro (5–5)	Gregg (16)	20,311	40–57
98	July 24	Angels	3–9	Chatwood (6–6)	Guthrie (4–14)		15,676	40–58
99	July 26	@ Blue Jays	12–4	Arrieta (10–7)	Morrow (7–5)		17,477	41–58
100	July 27	@ Blue Jays	0–3	Romero (8–9)	Simón (2–4)	Rauch (8)	16,861	41–59
101	July 28	@ Blue Jays	5–8	Villanueva (6–2)	Bergesen (2–7)		16,152	41–60
102	July 29	@ Yankees	4–2	Guthrie (5–14)	Burnett (8–9)	Gregg (17)	46,499	42–60
103	July 30	@ Yankees	3–8	Colón (8–6)	Tillman (2–4)		46,469	42–61
104	July 30	@ Yankees	3–17	Nova (9–4)	Britton (6–8)		43,190	42–62
105	July 31	@ Yankees	2–4	García (10–7)	Arrieta (10–8)	Rivera (27)	46,913	42–63

August (12–17)

#	Date	Opponent	Score	Win	Loss	Save	Attendance	Record
106	August 2	@ Royals	8–2	Simón (3–4)	Chen (5–5)		17,116	43–63
107	August 3	@ Royals	2–6	Hochevar (8–8)	Guthrie (5–15)	Holland (1)	14,187	43–64
108	August 4	@ Royals	4–9	Wood (5–0)	Britton (6–9)		12,161	43–65
109	August 5	Blue Jays	4–5	Mills (1–1)	Hunter (1–2)	Rauch (11)	18,770	43–66
110	August 6	Blue Jays	6–2	Tillman (3–4)	Morrow (8–6)		19,396	44–66
111	August 7	Blue Jays	2–7	Romero (10–9)	Simón (3–5)		13,824	44–67
112	August 8	White Sox	6–7	Crain (6–3)	Johnson (5–4)	Santos (23)	17,498	44–68
113	August 9	White Sox	3–4	Floyd (10–10)	Reyes (5–9)	Santos (24)	14,177	44–69
114	August 10	White Sox	6–4 (10)	Gonzalez (2–2)	Frasor (2–2)		18,747	45–69
115	August 11	White Sox	3–6	Buehrle (10–5)	Tillman (3–5)	Santos (25)	21,040	45–70
116	August 12	Tigers	4–5	Penny (8–9)	Patton (0–1)	Valverde (34)	21,465	45–71
117	August 13	Tigers	5–6	Scherzer (12–7)	Guthrie (5–16)	Valverde (35)	24,144	45–72
118	August 14	Tigers	8–5	Reyes (6–9)	Fister (4–13)	Johnson (2)	18,348	46–72
119	August 15	@ Athletics	6–2	Hunter (2–2)	Gonzalez (9–11)		10,122	47–72
120	August 16	@ Athletics	4–8	Moscoso (6–6)	Matusz (1–5)		12,325	47–73
121	August 17	@ Athletics	5–6	McCarthy (6–6)	Simón (3–6)	Bailey (15)	20,448	47–74
122	August 19	@ Angels	3–8	Haren (13–6)	Reyes (6–10)		38,156	47–75
123	August 20	@ Angels	8–9 (12)	Rodney (3–5)	Gregg (0–2)		43,201	47–76
124	August 21	@ Angels	1–7	Williams (1–0)	Matusz (1–6)		37,148	47–77
125	August 22	@ Twins	4–1	Britton (7–9)	Pavano (6–10)	Gregg (18)	38,986	48–77
126	August 23	@ Twins	8–1	Simón (4–6)	Duensing (8–13)		38,786	49–77
127	August 24	@ Twins	6–1	Guthrie (6–16)	Slowey (0–2)		37,778	50–77
128	August 25	@ Twins	6–1	Reyes (7–10)	Swarzak (3–4)		38,406	51–77
129	August 26	Yankees	12–5	Hunter (3–2)	Burnett (9–11)		32,762	52–77
	August 27	Yankees	Postponed (Hurricane Irene); Makeup: September 8					
130	August 28	Yankees	2–0	Britton (7–9)	Colón (8–9)	Gregg (19)	28,751	53–77
131	August 28	Yankees	3–8	Nova (14–4)	Matusz (1–7)		37,528	53–78
132	August 29	Yankees	2–3	García (11–7)	Simón (4–7)	Rivera (34)	18,223	53–79
133	August 30	Blue Jays	6–5 (10)	Eyre (1–0)	Tallet (0–2)		10,756	54–79
134	August 31	Blue Jays	0–13	Álvarez (1–2)	Reyes (7–11)		14,211	54–80

September (15–13)

#	Date	Opponent	Score	Win	Loss	Save	Attendance	Record
135	September 1	Blue Jays	6–8	Camp (2–3)	Eyre (1–1)	Francisco (12)	11,617	54–81
136	September 2	@ Rays	3–2	Britton (9–9)	Price (12–12)	Gregg (20)	11,955	55–81
137	September 3	@ Rays	3–6	Davis (9–8)	Simón (4–8)	Farnsworth (23)	14,233	55–82
138	September 4	@ Rays	1–8	Hellickson (12–10)	Guthrie (6–17)		15,790	55–83
139	September 5	@ Yankees	10–11	Laffey (2–1)	Johnson (5–5)	Rivera (38)	45,069	55–84
140	September 6	@ Yankees	3–5	Wade (4–0)	Hunter (3–3)	Rivera (39)	44,573	55–85
141	September 7	@ Yankees	5–4 (11)	Strop (1–1)	Noesí (2–1)	Johnson (3)	40,104	56–85
142	September 8	Yankees	5–4 (10)	Rapada (1–0)	Proctor (2–4)		33,841	57–85
143	September 9	@ Blue Jays	2–0	Guthrie (7–17)	Cecil (4–9)	Johnson (4)	13,918	58–85
144	September 10	@ Blue Jays	4–5	Litsch (6–3)	Gregg (0–3)		17,742	58–86
145	September 11	@ Blue Jays	5–6	Carreño (1–0)	Hunter (3–4)	Francisco (14)	14,235	58–87
146	September 12	Rays	2–5	Niemann (10–7)	Britton (9–10)	Peralta (3)	11,924	58–88
147	September 13	Rays	4–2	Patton (1–1)	Howell (2–3)	Johnson (5)	13,262	59–88
148	September 14	Rays	6–2	Guthrie (8–17)	Davis (10–9)	Johnson (6)	14,669	60–88
149	September 16	Angels	8–3	Hunter (4–4)	Haren (15–9)		24,022	61–88
150	September 17	Angels	6–2	Britton (10–10)	Santana (11–12)		31,099	62–88
151	September 18	Angels	2–11	Weaver (18–7)	Simón (4–9)		27471	62–89
152	September 19	@ Red Sox	6–5	Guthrie (9–17)	Weiland (0–3)	Johnson (7)	37,885	63–89
153	September 19	@ Red Sox	9–18	Atchison (1–0)	Matusz (1–8)		37,261	63–90
154	September 20	@ Red Sox	7–5	Eyre (2–1)	Bard (2–9)	Johnson (8)	37,414	64–90
155	September 21	@ Red Sox	6–4	Rapada (2–0)	Beckett (13–6)	Johnson (9)	38,004	65–90
156	September 22	@ Tigers	6–5	Britton (11–10)	Pauley (5–6)	Gregg (21)	27,847	66–90
157	September 23	@ Tigers	3–4 (11)	Perry (1–0)	Eyre (2–2)		38,623	66–91
158	September 24	@ Tigers	6–5	Strop (2–1)	Schlereth (2–2)	Gregg (22)	44,846	67–91
159	September 25	@ Tigers	6–10	Penny (11–11)	Matusz (1–9)		41,051	67–92
160	September 26	Red Sox	6–3	Patton (2–1)	Beckett (13–7)		21,786	68–92
161	September 27	Red Sox	7–8	Aceves (10–2)	Britton (11–11)	Papelbon (31)	22,123	68–93
162	September 28	Red Sox	4–3	Johnson (6–5)	Papelbon (4–1)		29,749	69–93

== Player stats ==
=== Batting ===
Note: G = Games played; AB = At bats; R = Runs scored; H = Hits; 2B = Doubles; 3B = Triples; HR = Home runs; RBI = Runs batted in; AVG = Batting average; SB = Stolen bases

Player	G	AB	R	H	2B	3B	HR	RBI	AVG	SB
Ryan Adams	29	89	9	25	4	0	0	7	.281	0
Robert Andino	139	457	63	120	22	0	5	36	.263	13
Matt Angle	31	79	12	14	4	0	1	7	.177	11
Jake Arrieta	2	4	0	1	0	0	0	1	.250	0
Josh Bell	26	61	6	10	0	0	0	6	.164	0
Zach Britton	3	8	3	5	1	0	1	2	.625	0
Blake Davis	25	59	6	15	3	1	1	6	.254	1
Chris Davis	31	123	16	34	9	0	2	13	.276	1
Pedro Florimón	4	8	1	1	0	0	0	2	.125	0
Jake Fox	27	61	8	15	4	1	2	6	.246	0
Vladimir Guerrero	145	562	60	163	30	1	13	63	.290	2
Jeremy Guthrie	3	5	0	1	1	0	0	0	.200	0
J. J. Hardy	129	527	76	142	27	0	30	80	.269	0
Kyle Hudson	14	28	3	4	0	0	0	2	.143	2
César Izturis	18	30	4	6	0	0	0	1	.200	0
Chris Jakubauskas	2	3	0	2	0	0	0	1	.667	0
Adam Jones	151	567	68	159	26	2	25	83	.280	12
Derrek Lee	85	334	39	82	15	1	12	41	.246	2
Nick Markakis	160	641	72	182	31	1	15	73	.284	12
Brian Matusz	1	2	0	0	0	0	0	0	.000	0
Félix Pie	85	164	15	36	8	1	0	7	.220	3
Nolan Reimold	87	267	40	66	10	3	13	45	.247	7
Mark Reynolds	155	534	84	118	27	1	37	86	.221	6
Brian Roberts	39	163	18	36	7	1	3	19	.221	6
Luke Scott	64	209	24	46	11	0	9	22	.220	1
Brandon Snyder	6	13	2	3	1	0	0	1	.231	0
Craig Tatum	31	87	7	17	3	0	0	7	.195	1
Matt Wieters	139	500	72	131	28	0	22	68	.262	1
Team totals	162	5585	708	1434	273	13	191	684	.257	81

=== Pitching ===
Note: W = Wins; L = Losses; ERA = Earned run average; G = Games pitched; GS = Games started; SV = Saves; IP = Innings pitched; R = Runs allowed; ER = Earned runs allowed; BB = Walks allowed; K = Strikeouts

Player	W	L	ERA	G	GS	SV	IP	R	ER	BB	K
Jeremy Accardo	3	3	5.73	31	0	0	37.2	24	24	18	23
Jake Arrieta	10	8	5.05	22	22	0	119.1	70	67	59	93
Mitch Atkins	0	0	8.44	3	3	0	10.2	10	10	3	7
Brad Bergesen	2	7	5.70	34	12	0	101.0	73	64	32	61
Jason Berken	1	2	5.36	40	0	0	47.0	29	28	21	41
Zach Britton	11	11	4.61	28	28	0	154.1	93	79	62	97
Willie Eyre	2	2	3.44	19	0	0	18.1	7	7	5	10
Mike Gonzalez	2	2	4.27	49	0	1	46.1	26	22	18	46
Kevin Gregg	0	3	4.37	63	0	22	59.2	35	29	40	53
Jeremy Guthrie	9	17	4.33	34	32	0	208.0	113	100	66	130
Mark Hendrickson	1	0	5.73	8	0	0	11.0	7	7	6	5
Tommy Hunter	3	3	5.06	12	11	0	69.1	44	39	10	35
Rick van den Hurk	0	0	8.00	4	2	0	9.0	9	8	8	7
Chris Jakubauskas	2	2	5.72	33	6	0	72.1	46	46	29	52
Jim Johnson	6	5	2.67	69	0	9	91.0	30	27	21	58
Brian Matusz	1	9	10.69	12	12	0	49.2	60	59	24	38
Troy Patton	2	1	3.00	20	0	0	30.0	10	10	5	22
Zach Phillips	0	0	1.13	10	0	0	8.0	1	1	2	8
Clay Rapada	2	0	6.06	32	0	0	16.1	11	11	7	18
Jo-Jo Reyes	2	3	6.16	9	5	0	30.2	21	21	13	23
Josh Rupe	0	0	5.65	9	0	0	14.1	9	9	6	7
Alfredo Simón	4	9	4.90	23	16	0	115.2	69	63	40	83
Pedro Strop	2	0	0.73	12	0	0	12.1	1	1	3	12
Chris Tillman	3	5	5.52	13	13	0	62.0	41	38	25	46
Koji Uehara	1	1	1.72	43	0	0	47.0	9	9	8	62
Pedro Viola	0	0	9.82	4	0	0	3.2	4	4	2	4
Mark Worrell	0	0	36.00	4	0	0	2.0	8	8	2	3
Team totals	69	93	4.89	162	162	32	1446.2	860	786	535	1044

== Farm system ==
Level	Team	League	Manager
AAA	Norfolk Tides	International League	Gary Allenson
AA	Bowie Baysox	Eastern League	Gary Kendall
A	Frederick Keys	Carolina League	Orlando Gómez
A	Delmarva Shorebirds	South Atlantic League	Ryan Minor
A-Short Season	Aberdeen IronBirds	New York–Penn League	Leo Gómez
Rookie	GCL Orioles	Gulf Coast League	Ramón Sambo
