= 2011 Tampa Bay Rays season =

2011 Tampa Bay Rays
- American League Wild Card winner
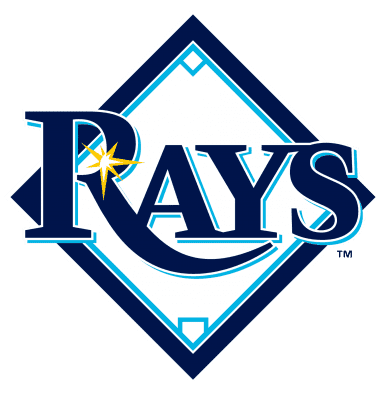
- League: American League
- Division: East
- Ballpark: Tropicana Field
- City: St. Petersburg, Florida
- Record: 91–71 (.562)
- Divisional place: 2nd
- Owners: Stuart Sternberg
- General managers: Andrew Friedman (de facto)
- Managers: Joe Maddon
- Television: Sun Sports (Dewayne Staats, Brian Anderson)
- Radio: Tampa Bay Rays Radio Network, Andy Freed, Dave Wills (English); Genesis 680 (Spanish)

The Tampa Bay Rays 2011 season was the team's 14th season in Major League Baseball. Despite starting the season 0–6 and trailing the Boston Red Sox by 9 games as late in the season as September 3, the Rays captured the AL Wild Card and made consecutive playoff appearances for the first time in franchise history. However, they lost to the Texas Rangers in four games in the Division Series, the second year in a row they lost to Texas in the first round of the playoffs.

== Offseason ==
The Rays declined the options of reliever Dan Wheeler and infielder Willy Aybar, and added Elliot Johnson to the 40-man roster on November 3, 2010. Becoming a free agent, Wheeler stated that he was open to re-sign with the Rays, saying the two sides talked about "keeping the lines of communication open." Aybar is eligible for arbitration, and therefore remains under the team's control.

Seven of the Rays' nine free agents were offered arbitration on November 23, 2010. Those players were left fielder Carl Crawford, utility player Brad Hawpe, and relievers Grant Balfour, Rafael Soriano, Randy Choate, Chad Qualls, and Joaquín Benoit. All seven players declined arbitration. First baseman Carlos Peña and reliever Dan Wheeler were the two players not offered arbitration.

On December 3, 2010, the Rays tendered first baseman Dan Johnson, while infielder Willy Aybar, catcher Dioner Navarro, and relievers Lance Cormier and J. P. Howell were nontendered. Howell, who missed the entire 2010 season with a shoulder injury and will reportedly miss the beginning of April in 2011, was expected to re-sign with the team, and did so on December 14.

The Rays lost first baseman Carlos Peña when he signed a one-year contract with the Chicago Cubs on December 8, 2010.

Left fielder Carl Crawford, who had played in the Rays organization his entire career since being drafted in 1999, signed with the Boston Red Sox on December 9, 2010. Crawford had been considered one of the top free agents during the offseason, and agreed to a 7-year $142 million deal with Boston, making him the second-highest paid outfielder and the 10th-highest paid player overall in baseball history.

Relief pitcher Randy Choate signed a two-year contract with the Florida Marlins on December 15, 2010. A day later, the Rays signed former Washington Nationals reliever Joel Peralta to a one-year, $600,000 deal.

Shortstop Jason Bartlett was reported to have been traded to the San Diego Padres for two minor league relievers on December 8, 2010, but the trade was not actually completed until December 17. When the transaction was finally made, it was learned that the Rays would give up Bartlett and a player to be named later in exchange for three relievers and one infielder.

Relief pitcher Dan Wheeler departed when he signed a one-year contract with the Boston Red sox.

On January 8, 2011, the Rays completed a trade with the Chicago Cubs, sending starting pitcher Matt Garza, outfielder Fernando Perez, and minor league pitcher Zach Rosscup in exchange for five minor league prospects including Chris Archer and Sam Fuld.

Closer Rafael Soriano, who led the American League with 45 saves in 2010 with the Rays, signed a 3-year $35 million deal with the New York Yankees on January 14.

The Rays added to their bullpen on January 15, with the signing of Kyle Farnsworth. The contract was worth $3.25 million for one year, with a club option for 2012.

On January 21, it was reported that the Rays had agreed to terms with veteran outfielders/designated hitters Johnny Damon and Manny Ramirez. Both contracts were for one year, with Damon signing for $5.25 million, while Ramirez's deal was worth only $2 million.

== Summary ==
=== April ===
Third baseman Evan Longoria was placed on the 15-day disabled list on April 3 for a strained left oblique. Manager Joe Maddon said he expected him to be out for three weeks. Felipe López was called up to replace him on the roster. RHP Mike Ekstrom was designated for assignment to make room for López on the 40-man roster.

Prior to their game on April 8, it was announced that Manny Ramirez was retiring. Ramirez, who appeared in five games with the Rays, had one hit in 17 at-bats. His decision to go into retirement was related to a positive test for a banned substance. Had he not retired, he would have faced a 100-game suspension.

The Rays started the season 0–6, their worst start in franchise history, but finished the month of April with a record of 15–12, 1½ games behind the New York Yankees for first place in the AL East. The Rays became the first team in league history to start the season 0–6 and finish April with a winning record.

=== May ===
When Evan Longoria was activated from the disabled list on May 3, the Rays designated infielder Felipe López for assignment. López cleared waivers, accepting an assignment to Triple-A Durham.

For his actions during a May 4 game, center fielder B. J. Upton was suspended for two games and fined $1,500. Upton was ejected during that game for arguing with home plate umpire Chad Fairchild over a called strikeout. After being tossed from the game, Upton began yelling at the umpire, throwing his batting helmet and batting gloves to the ground, and had to be restrained by bench coach Dave Martinez and third base coach Tom Foley. Upton appealed the suspension when it was announced on May 7. He would end up serving the two-game suspension, which began on May 12.

Starting pitcher Jeff Niemann was placed on the 15-day disabled list on May 6. Outfielder Brandon Guyer was called up to take the open roster spot. In his first major-league at-bat, Guyer hit a home run, becoming the second player in Rays history to hit a home run in his first career at-bat. Guyer was optioned back to Durham on May 8 when the Rays recalled relief pitcher Rob Delaney.

First baseman Dan Johnson was designated for assignment by the Rays on May 20, and relief pitcher Rob Delaney was optioned to Triple-A Durham. Johnson had a .115 batting average with one home run and three RBIs in 25 games. He cleared waivers and accepted an assignment to Durham on May 24. Taking one of the open spots on the roster was relief pitcher J. P. Howell, who returned to the team more than a full year after undergoing shoulder surgery. Outfielder Justin Ruggiano was also called up.

Starting pitcher Jeremy Hellickson was named the American League Rookie of the Month as well as Pitcher of the Month. Hellickson compiled a 4–1 record with a 1.36 ERA. He surrendered only five earned runs in 33 innings pitched, and struck out 23 batters. He limited opponents to a .168 batting average.

The Rays went 14–13 in May, improving to 29–25 overall, 1½ games behind first place in the division.

=== June ===
Starting pitcher James Shields surpassed the franchise record for complete games in a season on June 20 after throwing his sixth complete game.

At the end of the month, the Rays were 45–36, having gone 16–11 in June. They were third in the division, four games behind the lead.

=== July ===
Starting pitchers David Price and James Shields, as well as outfielder Matt Joyce, were all named to the American League All-Star team on July 3. Infielder/outfielder Ben Zobrist was one of the five players in the running for the Final Vote, but did not win. Joyce would be the only player to participate in the All-Star Game, as Price was suffering from turf toe, and Shields was ineligible to pitch after starting two days before the All-Star Game.

Catcher John Jaso was placed on the disabled list on July 15 with a right oblique strain. José Lobatón was called up from the minors.

Starting pitcher Wade Davis was placed on the disabled list on July 7. Relief pitcher Brandon Gomes was recalled from the minors to take his spot on the roster.

On July 17, in a nationally televised game, the Rays hosted the Boston Red Sox in a 16-inning game that lasted 5 hours and 42 minutes, ending at 1:35 a.m. EDT. It was the longest game in the history of the franchise in terms of time played, and matched the longest game by number of innings. It was also the latest a game ended in franchise history. The Rays became the first team since 1919 to have only three base hits in a game lasting 16 or more innings. The Rays lost 1–0. Following the game, catcher José Lobatón was placed on the disabled list. Robinson Chirinos took his spot on the roster. Manager Joe Maddon was ejected in the 11th inning for arguing an earlier check swing call during a pitching change and bench coach Dave Martinez was tossed later in the inning for unsportsmanlike conduct.

On July 18, relief pitcher Adam Russell was designated for assignment, while relief pitcher Juan Cruz was placed on the disabled list with a groin injury. Relievers Alex Cobb and Alex Torres were recalled from the minors.

The Rays ended July with an 11–15 record, falling to 56–51 overall. They were still third place in the division, but dropped to 10½ games behind the lead.

=== August ===
On August 10, it was announced that starting pitcher Alex Cobb would have to undergo surgery to remove a blockage in his ribs, which would cause him to miss the remainder of the season.

The Rays went 18–10 in August, going into the final month of the season in third place in the division and nine games behind for the lead.

=== September and Game 162 ===
The Rays trailed the Boston Red Sox in the American League Wild Card by nine games as late as September 3. Historically, no team had qualified for the postseason after facing a deficit that large in the month of September. The Rays defeated the Red Sox in six out of seven games the teams played against each other in September, pulling into a tie for the Wild Card on September 26, with only two games remaining in the regular season. On September 28, the Rays won the final game against the Yankees in spectacular fashion. Trailing 5–0 after just two innings and 7–0 going into the 8th inning; the Rays loaded the bases with no outs. Pinch hitter Sam Fuld then drew a bases-loaded walk to drive in the Rays first run of the game. Sean Rodriguez was then hit by a pitch to score the second run. After a one-out sacrifice fly by B.J. Upton, making the score 7–3, Evan Longoria came to the plate and hit the first pitch he saw over the left field wall, a three-run home run that cut the deficit to 7–6. Then in the bottom of the ninth inning, after the first two Rays batters struck out, pinch hitter Dan Johnson, never known for his hitting abilities and having just a .108 average for the season, hit a home run on a 2–2 count to tie the game at 7–7. The game then played for three more innings before the Rays capped their comeback in the bottom of the 12th, clinching their third ever franchise postseason berth, winning the Wild Card when Evan Longoria again stepped to the plate, and hit a walk-off home run down the left field line which barely cleared the lowest wall in the park, giving the Rays an 8–7 victory.

Game 162 is commemorated in two ways in Tropicana Field. There is 162 Landing, a designation in the left field corner where Longoria's playoff-clinching home run landed. The area is located off Left Field Street where Evan Longoria's 12th-inning walk-off homer landed September 28 to beat the Yankees and propel Tampa Bay to the postseason. The entrance to 162 Landing is open to the public and includes a recap of the events there and at Camden Yards from that night, video highlights and interviews, photos and displays. There also is a white seat in the right field corner commemorating where Dan Johnson's two-out, two-strike game-tying homer landed in the bottom of the ninth, in Section 140, Seat 10, Row T.

Insights from pitcher James Shields and sports writer Bill Chastain in their book, September Nights, are a baseball classic in Tampa Bay.

=== Season standings ===
==== American League East ====
AL East
| Team | W | L | Pct. | GB | Home | Road |
|---|---|---|---|---|---|---|
| New York Yankees | 97 | 65 | .599 | — | 52‍–‍29 | 45‍–‍36 |
| Tampa Bay Rays | 91 | 71 | .562 | 6 | 47‍–‍34 | 44‍–‍37 |
| Boston Red Sox | 90 | 72 | .556 | 7 | 45‍–‍36 | 45‍–‍36 |
| Toronto Blue Jays | 81 | 81 | .500 | 16 | 42‍–‍39 | 39‍–‍42 |
| Baltimore Orioles | 69 | 93 | .426 | 28 | 39‍–‍42 | 30‍–‍51 |

==== American League Wild Card ====
Division winners
| Team | W | L | Pct. |
|---|---|---|---|
| New York Yankees | 97 | 65 | .599 |
| Texas Rangers | 96 | 66 | .593 |
| Detroit Tigers | 95 | 67 | .586 |

Wild Card team (Top team qualifies for postseason)
| Team | W | L | Pct. | GB |
|---|---|---|---|---|
| Tampa Bay Rays | 91 | 71 | .562 | — |
| Boston Red Sox | 90 | 72 | .556 | 1 |
| Los Angeles Angels of Anaheim | 86 | 76 | .531 | 5 |
| Toronto Blue Jays | 81 | 81 | .500 | 10 |
| Cleveland Indians | 80 | 82 | .494 | 11 |
| Chicago White Sox | 79 | 83 | .488 | 12 |
| Oakland Athletics | 74 | 88 | .457 | 17 |
| Kansas City Royals | 71 | 91 | .438 | 20 |
| Baltimore Orioles | 69 | 93 | .426 | 22 |
| Seattle Mariners | 67 | 95 | .414 | 24 |
| Minnesota Twins | 63 | 99 | .389 | 28 |

=== Record vs. opponents ===
2011 American League record Source: MLB Standings Grid – 2011
| Team | BAL | BOS | CWS | CLE | DET | KC | LAA | MIN | NYY | OAK | SEA | TB | TEX | TOR | NL |
|---|---|---|---|---|---|---|---|---|---|---|---|---|---|---|---|
| Baltimore | – | 8–10 | 4–4 | 2–5 | 5–5 | 5–4 | 3–6 | 6–2 | 5–13 | 4–5 | 4–2 | 9–9 | 1–5 | 6–12 | 7–11 |
| Boston | 10–8 | – | 2–4 | 4–6 | 5–1 | 5–3 | 6–2 | 5–2 | 12–6 | 6–2 | 5–4 | 6–12 | 4–6 | 10–8 | 10–8 |
| Chicago | 4–4 | 4–2 | – | 11–7 | 5–13 | 7–11 | 2–6 | 9–9 | 2–6 | 6–4 | 7–2 | 4–4 | 4–4 | 3–4 | 11–7 |
| Cleveland | 5–2 | 6–4 | 7–11 | – | 6–12 | 12–6 | 3–6 | 11–7 | 3–4 | 5–2 | 5–4 | 2–4 | 1–9 | 3–4 | 11–7 |
| Detroit | 5–5 | 1–5 | 13–5 | 12–6 | – | 11–7 | 3–4 | 14–4 | 4–3 | 5–5 | 4–6 | 6–1 | 6–3 | 4–2 | 7–11 |
| Kansas City | 4–5 | 3–5 | 11–7 | 6–12 | 7–11 | – | 7–3 | 8–10 | 3–3 | 4–5 | 5–3 | 2–5 | 2–6 | 4–3 | 5–13 |
| Los Angeles | 6–3 | 2–6 | 6–2 | 6–3 | 4–3 | 3–7 | – | 6–3 | 4–5 | 8–11 | 12–7 | 4–4 | 7–12 | 5–5 | 13–5 |
| Minnesota | 2–6 | 2–5 | 9–9 | 7–11 | 4–14 | 10–8 | 3–6 | – | 2–6 | 4–4 | 3–5 | 3–7 | 5–3 | 1–5 | 8–10 |
| New York | 13–5 | 6–12 | 6–2 | 4–3 | 3–4 | 3–3 | 5–4 | 6–2 | – | 6–3 | 5–4 | 9–9 | 7–2 | 11–7 | 13–5 |
| Oakland | 5–4 | 2–6 | 4–6 | 2–5 | 5–5 | 5–4 | 11–8 | 4–4 | 3–6 | – | 9–10 | 5–2 | 6–13 | 5–5 | 8–10 |
| Seattle | 2–4 | 4–5 | 2–7 | 4–5 | 6–4 | 3–5 | 7–12 | 5–3 | 4–5 | 10–9 | – | 4–6 | 4–15 | 3–6 | 9–9 |
| Tampa Bay | 9–9 | 12–6 | 4–4 | 4–2 | 1–6 | 5–2 | 4–4 | 7–3 | 9–9 | 2–5 | 6–4 | – | 4–5 | 12–6 | 12–6 |
| Texas | 5–1 | 6–4 | 4–4 | 9–1 | 3–6 | 6–2 | 12–7 | 3–5 | 2–7 | 13–6 | 15–4 | 5–4 | – | 4–6 | 9–9 |
| Toronto | 12–6 | 8–10 | 4–3 | 4–3 | 2–4 | 3–4 | 5–5 | 5–1 | 7–11 | 5–5 | 6–3 | 6–12 | 6–4 | – | 8–10 |

- Source: MLB Standings Grid – 2011

=== Roster ===
2011 Tampa Bay Rays
Roster
| Pitchers: 51 Jay Buente; 53 Alex Cobb; 37 Juan Cruz; 40 Wade Davis; 49 Dane De La Rosa; 55 Rob Delaney; 54 Mike Ekstrom; 43 Kyle Farnsworth; 47 Brandon Gomes; 58 Jeremy Hellickson; 74 J. P. Howell; 57 Jake McGee; 55 Matt Moore; 34 Jeff Niemann; 62 Joel Peralta; 14 David Price; 55,27 Cesar Ramos; 36 Adam Russell; 33 James Shields; 21 Andy Sonnanstine; 56 Alexander Torres | Catchers: 38 Robinson Chirinos; 28 John Jaso; 31 José Lobatón; 10 Kelly Shoppach; Infielders: 15 Reid Brignac; 29,24 Dan Johnson; 9 Elliot Johnson; 11 Casey Kotchman; 3 Evan Longoria; 45 Felipe López; 1 Sean Rodriguez; 18 Ben Zobrist | Outfielders: 22 Johnny Damon; 5 Sam Fuld; 30 Brandon Guyer; 8 Desmond Jennings; 20 Matthew Joyce; 16 Justin Ruggiano; 2 B. J. Upton; Other batters: 45 Russ Canzler; 24 Manny Ramirez | Manager: 70 Joe Maddon; Coaches: 46 Stan Boroski; 77 Scott Cursi (bullpen catcher); 6 Tom Foley (third base); 25 George Hendrick (first base); 48 Jim Hickey (pitching); 4 Dave Martinez (bench); 7 Bobby Ramos (bullpen); 17 Derek Shelton (hitting); 63 Don Zimmer (coach) |

== Game log ==
The Rays opened the 2011 season at home against the Baltimore Orioles for the second consecutive season.

Legend
| | Rays win |
| | Rays loss |
| | Postponement |
| | Clinched playoff spot |
| **Bold** | Rays team member |

=== Regular season ===
2011 Game Log
April (15–12)

| # | Date | Opponent | Score | Win | Loss | Save | Attendance | Record |
|---|---|---|---|---|---|---|---|---|
| 1 | April 1 | Orioles | 1–4 | Guthrie (1–0) | **Price** (0–1) | | 34,708 | 0–1 |
| 2 | April 2 | Orioles | 1–3 | Accardo (1–0) | **Shields** (0–1) | | 22,164 | 0–2 |
| 3 | April 3 | Orioles | 1–5 | Britton (1–0) | **Davis** (0–1) | | 17,408 | 0–3 |
| 4 | April 5 | Angels | 3–5 | Weaver (2–0) | **Niemann** (0–1) | Walden (1) | 13,173 | 0–4 |
| 5 | April 6 | Angels | 1–5 | Haren (1–0) | **Hellickson** (0–1) | | 11,836 | 0–5 |
| 6 | April 7 | @ White Sox | 1–5 | Jackson (2–0) | **Price** (0–2) | | 38,579 | 0–6 |
| 7 | April 8 | @ White Sox | 9–7 | **Russell** (1–0) | Thornton (0–1) | **Farnsworth** (1) | 20,199 | 1–6 |
| 8 | April 9 | @ White Sox | 2–4 | Humber (1–0) | **Davis** (0–2) | Sale (1) | 26,378 | 1–7 |
| 9 | April 10 | @ White Sox | 1–6 | Floyd (1–0) | **Niemann** (0–2) | | 23,436 | 1–8 |
| 10 | April 11 | @ Red Sox | 16–5 | **Hellickson** (1–1) | Matsuzaka (0–2) | | 37,568 | 2–8 |
| 11 | April 12 | @ Red Sox | 3–2 | **Price** (1–2) | Lester (0–1) | **Farnsworth** (2) | 37,105 | 3–8 |
| — | April 13 | @ Red Sox | Postponed (rain); Makeup: August 16 | | | | | |
| 12 | April 14 | Twins | 4–3 (10) | **Farnsworth** (1–0) | Capps (1–1) | | 10,042 | 4–8 |
| 13 | April 15 | Twins | 5–2 | **Davis** (1–2) | Blackburn (1–2) | **Farnsworth** (3) | 15,342 | 5–8 |
| 14 | April 16 | Twins | 4–3 | **Cruz** (1–0) | Nathan (0–1) | | 16,428 | 6–8 |
| 15 | April 17 | Twins | 2–4 | Duensing (1–0) | **Hellickson** (1–2) | Capps (1) | 22,246 | 6–9 |
| 16 | April 18 | White Sox | 5–0 | **Price** (2–2) | Jackson (2–1) | | 12,016 | 7–9 |
| 17 | April 19 | White Sox | 2–1 | **Shields** (1–1) | Danks (0–2) | | 13,731 | 8–9 |
| 18 | April 20 | White Sox | 4–1 | **Davis** (2–2) | Humber (1–2) | **Farnsworth** (4) | 13,214 | 9–9 |
| 19 | April 21 | White Sox | 2–9 | Floyd (2–1) | **Niemann** (0–3) | | 16,751 | 9–10 |
| 20 | April 22 | @ Blue Jays | 4–6 (11) | Rzepczynski (2–0) | **Russell** (1–1) | | 23,192 | 9–11 |
| 21 | April 23 | @ Blue Jays | 6–4 | **Price** (3–2) | Morrow (0–1) | **Farnsworth** (5) | 21,826 | 10–11 |
| 22 | April 24 | @ Blue Jays | 2–0 | **Shields** (2–1) | Romero (1–3) | | 14,456 | 11–11 |
| — | April 26 | @ Twins | Postponed (rain); Makeup: April 28 | | | | | |
| 23 | April 27 | @ Twins | 8–2 | **Davis** (3–2) | Liriano (1–4) | | 36,714 | 12–11 |
| 24 | April 28 | @ Twins | 15–3 | **Hellickson** (2–2) | Blackburn (1–4) | | 38,315 | 13–11 |
| 25 | April 28 | @ Twins | 6–1 | **Niemann** (1–3) | Swarzak (0–1) | | 36,456 | 14–11 |
| 26 | April 29 | Angels | 5–8 | Santana (1–3) | **Price** (3–3) | Walden (4) | 21,791 | 14–12 |
| 27 | April 30 | Angels | 2–1 (10) | **Peralta** (1–0) | Rodney (0–1) | | 20,245 | 15–12 |

May (14–13)

| # | Date | Opponent | Score | Win | Loss | Save | Attendance | Record |
|---|---|---|---|---|---|---|---|---|
| 28 | May 1 | Angels | 5–6 | Thompson (1–1) | **Peralta** (1–1) | Walden (5) | 16,248 | 15–13 |
| 29 | May 3 | Blue Jays | 3–2 | **Farnsworth** (2–0) | Rauch (1–2) | | 10,248 | 16–13 |
| 30 | May 4 | Blue Jays | 2–3 | Morrow (1–1) | **Niemann** (1–4) | Francisco (1) | 10,099 | 16–14 |
| 31 | May 5 | Blue Jays | 3–1 | **Price** (4–3) | Drabek (2–2) | **Farnsworth** (6) | 12,682 | 17–14 |
| 32 | May 6 | @ Orioles | 6–2 | **Shields** (3–1) | Britton (5–2) | | 20,694 | 18–14 |
| 33 | May 7 | @ Orioles | 8–2 | **Hellickson** (3–2) | Guthrie (1–5) | | 18,961 | 19–14 |
| 34 | May 8 | @ Orioles | 5–3 | **Davis** (4–2) | Bergesen (0–4) | **Farnsworth** (7) | 16,359 | 20–14 |
| 35 | May 10 | @ Indians | 4–5 | Perez (2–1) | **Peralta** (1–2) | | 13,551 | 20–15 |
| 36 | May 11 | @ Indians | 8–2 | **Price** (5–3) | Carrasco (1–2) | | 17,741 | 21–15 |
| 37 | May 12 | @ Indians | 7–4 | **Shields** (4–1) | Masterson (5–1) | | 18,107 | 22–15 |
| 38 | May 13 | Orioles | 3–0 | **Hellickson** (4–2) | Guthrie (1–6) | | 20,476 | 23–15 |
| 39 | May 14 | Orioles | 0–6 | Bergesen (1–4) | **Davis** (4–3) | | 28,451 | 23–16 |
| 40 | May 15 | Orioles | 3–9 | Arrieta (5–1) | **Sonnanstine** (0–1) | | 21,505 | 23–17 |
| 41 | May 16 | Yankees | 6–5 | **Cruz** (2–0) | Burnett (4–3) | **Farnsworth** (8) | 25,024 | 24–17 |
| 42 | May 17 | Yankees | 2–6 | Nova (4–3) | **Shields** (4–2) | | 27,123 | 24–18 |
| 43 | May 18 | @ Blue Jays | 6–5 | **Hellickson** (5–2) | Litsch (4–3) | **Farnsworth** (9) | 14,415 | 25–18 |
| 44 | May 19 | @ Blue Jays | 2–3 | Romero (4–4) | **Davis** (4–4) | Francisco (5) | 12,590 | 25–19 |
| 45 | May 20 | @ Marlins | 3–5 | Dunn (4–2) | **Peralta** (1–3) | Núñez (16) | 18,111 | 25–20 |
| 46 | May 21 | @ Marlins | 3–5 | Vázquez (3–4) | **Price** (5–4) | Núñez (17) | 21,814 | 25–21 |
| 47 | May 22 | @ Marlins | 4–0 | **Shields** (5–2) | Buente (0–1) | | 15,432 | 26–21 |
| 48 | May 23 | @ Tigers | 3–6 | Furbush (1–0) | **Hellickson** (5–3) | | 21,550 | 26–22 |
| 49 | May 24 | @ Tigers | 6–7 | Alburquerque (1–1) | **Ramos** (0–1) | Benoit (1) | 24,133 | 26–23 |
| — | May 25 | @ Tigers | Postponed (rain); Makeup: June 13 | | | | | |
| 50 | May 27 | Indians | 5–0 | **Price** (6–4) | Tomlin (6–2) | | 16,800 | 27–23 |
| 51 | May 28 | Indians | 3–7 | Carrasco (4–2) | **Shields** (5–3) | Perez (14) | 24,717 | 27–24 |
| 52 | May 29 | Indians | 7–0 | **Hellickson** (6–3) | Masterson (5–3) | | 23,898 | 28–24 |
| 53 | May 30 | Rangers | 5–11 | Holland (4–1) | **Davis** (4–5) | | 14,203 | 28–25 |
| 54 | May 31 | Rangers | 5–4 | **Peralta** (2–3) | Rhodes (3–3) | **Farnsworth** (10) | 12,783 | 29–25 |

June (16–11)

| # | Date | Opponent | Score | Win | Loss | Save | Attendance | Record |
|---|---|---|---|---|---|---|---|---|
| 55 | June 1 | Rangers | 0–3 | Lewis (5–5) | **Price** (6–5) | Feliz (11) | 13,725 | 29–26 |
| 56 | June 2 | @ Mariners | 2–8 | Hernández (6–4) | **Shields** (5–4) | | 16,376 | 29–27 |
| 57 | June 3 | @ Mariners | 0–7 | Vargas (4–3) | **Sonnanstine** (0–2) | | 24,492 | 29–28 |
| 58 | June 4 | @ Mariners | 3–2 | **Hellickson** (7–3) | Fister (3–6) | **Farnsworth** (11) | 28,843 | 30–28 |
| 59 | June 5 | @ Mariners | 6–9 | Wright (2–2) | **Howell** (0–1) | League (16) | 28,947 | 30–29 |
| 60 | June 6 | @ Angels | 5–1 | **Price** (7–5) | Chatwood (3–3) | | 32,287 | 31–29 |
| 61 | June 7 | @ Angels | 4–1 | **Cobb** (1–0) | Haren (5–4) | **Farnsworth** (12) | 38,833 | 32–29 |
| 62 | June 8 | @ Angels | 4–3 (10) | **Cruz** (3–0) | Rodney (2–3) | **Farnsworth** (13) | 33,157 | 33–29 |
| 63 | June 10 | @ Orioles | 0–7 | Arrieta (8–3) | **Hellickson** (7–4) | | 17,900 | 33–30 |
| 64 | June 11 | @ Orioles | 7–5 (11) | **Cruz** (4–0) | Accardo (3–2) | **Farnsworth** (14) | 25,541 | 34–30 |
| 65 | June 12 | @ Orioles | 9–6 | **Davis** (5–5) | Matusz (1–1) | **Howell** (1) | 22,032 | 35–30 |
| 66 | June 13 | @ Tigers | 1–2 (10) | Purcey (1–0) | **Farnsworth** (2–1) | | 30,938 | 35–31 |
| 67 | June 14 | Red Sox | 4–0 | **Shields** (6–4) | Wakefield (3–2) | | 20,972 | 36–31 |
| 68 | June 15 | Red Sox | 0–3 | Beckett (6–2) | **Hellickson** (7–5) | | 19,388 | 36–32 |
| 69 | June 16 | Red Sox | 2–4 | Buchholz (6–3) | **Price** (7–6) | Papelbon (13) | 23,495 | 36–33 |
| 70 | June 17 | Marlins | 5–1 | **Davis** (6–5) | Hand (0–3) | **Farnsworth** (15) | 15,708 | 37–33 |
| 71 | June 18 | Marlins | 7–4 | **Cobb** (2–0) | Nolasco (4–3) | | 20,495 | 38–33 |
| 72 | June 19 | Marlins | 2–1 | **Shields** (7–4) | Webb (1–4) | | 26,761 | 39–33 |
| 73 | June 20 | @ Brewers | 8–4 | **Niemann** (2–4) | Narveson (4–5) | | 35,495 | 40–33 |
| 74 | June 21 | @ Brewers | 1–5 | Greinke (7–2) | **Hellickson** (7–6) | | 40,079 | 40–34 |
| 75 | June 22 | @ Brewers | 6–3 | **Price** (8–6) | Estrada (1–5) | | 39,632 | 41–34 |
| 76 | June 24 | @ Astros | 5–1 | **Shields** (8–4) | W. Rodríguez (5–4) | | 26,682 | 42–34 |
| 77 | June 25 | @ Astros | 7–2 | **Davis** (7–5) | Norris (4–6) | **Farnsworth** (16) | 27,208 | 43–34 |
| 78 | June 26 | @ Astros | 14–10 | **Howell** (1–1) | López (1–4) | | 23,965 | 44–34 |
| 79 | June 27 | Reds | 0–5 | Leake (7–4) | **Hellickson** (7–7) | | 19,891 | 44–35 |
| 80 | June 28 | Reds | 4–3 | **Farnsworth** (3–1) | Ondrusek (3–3) | | 20,894 | 45–35 |
| 81 | June 29 | Reds | 3–4 | Volquez (5–3) | **Shields** (8–5) | Cordero (16) | 25,968 | 45–36 |

July (11–15)

| # | Date | Opponent | Score | Win | Loss | Save | Attendance | Record |
|---|---|---|---|---|---|---|---|---|
| 82 | July 1 | Cardinals | 3–5 | Westbrook (7–4) | **Davis** (7–6) | Salas (14) | 19,934 | 45–37 |
| 83 | July 2 | Cardinals | 5–1 | **Niemann** (3–4) | McClellan (6–5) | | 23,897 | 46–37 |
| 84 | July 3 | Cardinals | 8–3 | **Hellickson** (8–7) | Lohse (8–5) | **Farnsworth** (17) | 26,819 | 47–37 |
| 85 | July 4 | @ Twins | 0–7 | Duensing (6–7) | **Price** (8–7) | | 39,528 | 47–38 |
| 86 | July 5 | @ Twins | 2–3 | Baker (7–5) | **Shields** (8–6) | Perkins (2) | 38,613 | 47–39 |
| 87 | July 6 | @ Twins | 12–5 | **Howell** (2–1) | Burnett (2–5) | | 39,841 | 48–39 |
| 88 | July 7 | @ Yankees | 5–1 | **Niemann** (4–4) | Colón (6–4) | | 47,787 | 49–39 |
| — | July 8 | @ Yankees | | Postponed (rain); Makeup: September 22 | | | | |
| 89 | July 9 | @ Yankees | 4–5 | Robertson (2–0) | **Peralta** (2–4) | Rivera (22) | 48,103 | 49–40 |
| 90 | July 10 | @ Yankees | 0–1 | Sabathia (13–4) | **Shields** (8–7) | | 47,350 | 49–41 |
**All-Star Break**
| 91 | July 15 | Red Sox | 9–6 | **Price** (9–7) | Miller (3–1) | **Farnsworth** (18) | 25,729 | 50–41 |
| 92 | July 16 | Red Sox | 5–9 | Lackey (7–8) | **Shields** (8–8) | | 32,487 | 50–42 |
| 93 | July 17 | Red Sox | 0–1 (16) | Aceves (5–1) | **Russell** (1–2) | Papelbon (21) | 21,504 | 50–43 |
| 94 | July 18 | Yankees | 4–5 | Robertson (3–0) | **Torres** (0–1) | Rivera (24) | 22,471 | 50–44 |
| 95 | July 19 | Yankees | 3–2 | **Hellickson** (9–7) | Colón (6–6) | **Peralta** (1) | 22,780 | 51–44 |
| 96 | July 20 | Yankees | 0–4 | García (8–7) | **Price** (9–8) | | 21,505 | 51–45 |
| 97 | July 21 | Yankees | 2–1 | **Shields** (9–8) | Sabathia (14–5) | **Farnsworth** (19) | 29,279 | 52–45 |
| 98 | July 22 | @ Royals | 4–10 | Hochevar (6–8) | **Davis** (7–7) | | 27,824 | 52–46 |
| 99 | July 23 | @ Royals | 4–5 (10) | Soria (5–3) | **Gomes** (0–1) | | 27,643 | 52–47 |
| 100 | July 24 | @ Royals | 5–0 | **Cobb** (3–0) | Paulino (1–4) | | 23,735 | 53–47 |
| 101 | July 25 | @ Athletics | 5–7 | Fuentes (2–8) | **Howell** (2–2) | Bailey (12) | 11,053 | 53–48 |
| 102 | July 26 | @ Athletics | 1–6 | McCarthy (3–5) | **Price** (9–9) | | 12,166 | 53–49 |
| 103 | July 27 | @ Athletics | 4–13 | Cahill (9–9) | **Shields** (9–9) | | 18,640 | 53–50 |
| 104 | July 28 | @ Athletics | 10–8 | **Davis** (8–7) | Ziegler (3–2) | **Farnsworth** (20) | 16,466 | 54–50 |
| 105 | July 29 | @ Mariners | 8–0 | **Niemann** (5–4) | Bédard (4–7) | | 26,570 | 55–50 |
| 106 | July 30 | @ Mariners | 2–3 | Pineda (9–7) | **Cobb** (3–1) | League (24) | 24,985 | 55–51 |
| 107 | July 31 | @ Mariners | 8–1 | **Hellickson** (10–7) | Vargas (6–10) | | 20,382 | 56–51 |

August (18–10)

| # | Date | Opponent | Score | Win | Loss | Save | Attendance | Record |
|---|---|---|---|---|---|---|---|---|
| 108 | August 2 | Blue Jays | 1–3 | Romero (9–9) | **Price** (9–10) | Rauch (10) | 13,333 | 56–52 |
| 109 | August 3 | Blue Jays | 9–1 | **Shields** (10–9) | Villanueva (6–3) | | 11,803 | 57–52 |
| 110 | August 4 | Blue Jays | 7–6 (12) | **Gomes** (1–1) | Camp (1–2) | | 28,491 | 58–52 |
| 111 | August 5 | Athletics | 8–4 | **Niemann** (6–4) | Moscoso (4–6) | | 15,168 | 59–52 |
| 112 | August 6 | Athletics | 0–8 | McCarthy (5–5) | **Cobb** (3–2) | | 24,939 | 59–53 |
| 113 | August 7 | Athletics | 4–5 (10) | De Los Santos (1–0) | **McGee** (0–1) | Bailey (13) | 21,425 | 59–54 |
| 114 | August 8 | Royals | 2–1 | **Farnsworth** (4–1) | Wood (5–1) | | 10,742 | 60–54 |
| 115 | August 9 | Royals | 4–0 | **Shields** (11–9) | Francis (4–12) | | 10,124 | 61–54 |
| 116 | August 10 | Royals | 8–7 | **McGee** (1–1) | Soria (5–5) | | 11,706 | 62–54 |
| 117 | August 11 | Royals | 4–1 | **Niemann** (7–4) | Duffy (3–6) | **Farnsworth** (21) | 13,942 | 63–54 |
| 118 | August 12 | @ Yankees | 5–1 | **Price** (10–10) | Sabathia (16–7) | | 47,894 | 64–54 |
| 119 | August 13 | @ Yankees | 2–9 | Hughes (3–4) | **Hellickson** (10–8) | | 47,804 | 64–55 |
| — | August 14 | @ Yankees | Postponed (rain); Makeup: September 21 | | | | | |
| 120 | August 16 | @ Red Sox | 1–3 | Lester (12–6) | **Shields** (11–10) | Papelbon (28) | 38,525 | 64–56 |
| 121 | August 16 | @ Red Sox | 6–2 | **Niemann** (8–4) | Bédard (4–8) | | 38,278 | 65–56 |
| 122 | August 17 | @ Red Sox | 4–0 | **Price** (11–10) | Lackey (11–9) | | 37,737 | 66–56 |
| 123 | August 19 | Mariners | 3–2 | **Cruz** (5–0) | Hernández (11–11) | **Farnsworth** (22) | 14,884 | 67–56 |
| 124 | August 20 | Mariners | 8–0 | **Hellickson** (11–8) | Furbush (3–5) | | 20,148 | 68–56 |
| 125 | August 21 | Mariners | 8–7 | **Farnsworth** (5–1) | Cortes (0–2) | | 17,226 | 69–56 |
| 126 | August 22 | Tigers | 2–5 | Verlander (19–5) | **Niemann** (8–5) | | 13,048 | 69–57 |
| 127 | August 23 | Tigers | 1–2 | Penny (9–9) | **Price** (11–11) | Coke (1) | 11,475 | 69–58 |
| 128 | August 24 | Tigers | 3–2 (10) | **Peralta** (3–4) | Below (0–2) | | 13,910 | 70–58 |
| 129 | August 25 | Tigers | 0–2 | Fister (6–13) | **Hellickson** (11–9) | Valverde (38) | 14,069 | 70–59 |
| 130 | August 26 | @ Blue Jays | 6–1 | **Shields** (12–10) | Álvarez (0–2) | | 20,491 | 71–59 |
| 131 | August 27 | @ Blue Jays | 6–5 | **Niemann** (9–5) | Camp (1–3) | **Peralta** (2) | 24,052 | 72–59 |
| 132 | August 28 | @ Blue Jays | 12–0 | **Price** (12–11) | Morrow (9–9) | | 21,618 | 73–59 |
| 133 | August 29 | @ Blue Jays | 3–7 | Romero (13–9) | **Davis** (8–8) | | 19,725 | 73–60 |
| 134 | August 30 | @ Rangers | 0–2 | Feldman (1–0) | **Hellickson** (11–10) | Feliz (26) | 23,069 | 73–61 |
| 135 | August 31 | @ Rangers | 4–1 | **Shields** (13–10) | Ogando (12–7) | | 28,034 | 74–61 |

September (17–10)

| # | Date | Opponent | Score | Win | Loss | Save | Attendance | Record |
|---|---|---|---|---|---|---|---|---|
| 136 | September 1 | @ Rangers | 2–7 | Wilson (14–6) | **Niemann** (9–6) | | 26,220 | 74–62 |
| 137 | September 2 | Orioles | 2–3 | Britton (9–9) | **Price** (12–12) | Gregg (20) | 11,955 | 74–63 |
| 138 | September 3 | Orioles | 6–3 | **Davis** (9–8) | Simón (4–8) | **Farnsworth** (23) | 14,223 | 75–63 |
| 139 | September 4 | Orioles | 8–1 | **Hellickson** (12–10) | Guthrie (6–17) | | 15,790 | 76–63 |
| 140 | September 5 | Rangers | 5–1 | **Shields** (14–10) | Feldman (1–1) | | 13,130 | 77–63 |
| 141 | September 6 | Rangers | 0–8 | Wilson (14–6) | **Niemann** (9–7) | | 11,611 | 77–64 |
| 142 | September 7 | Rangers | 5–4 (10) | **McGee** (2–1) | Lowe (2–3) | | 11,190 | 78–64 |
| 143 | September 9 | Red Sox | 7–2 | **Davis** (10–8) | Lackey (12–12) | | 18,482 | 79–64 |
| 144 | September 10 | Red Sox | 6–5 (11) | **Gomes** (2–1) | Bard (2–7) | | 24,566 | 80–64 |
| 145 | September 11 | Red Sox | 9–1 | **Shields** (15–10) | Lester (15–7) | | 25,220 | 81–64 |
| 146 | September 12 | @ Orioles | 5–2 | **Niemann** (10–7) | Britton (9–10) | **Peralta** (3) | 11,924 | 82–64 |
| 147 | September 13 | @ Orioles | 2–4 | Patton (1–1) | **Howell** (2–3) | Johnson (5) | 13,262 | 82–65 |
| 148 | September 14 | @ Orioles | 2–6 | Guthrie (8–17) | **Davis** (10–9) | Johnson (6) | 14,669 | 82–66 |
| 149 | September 15 | @ Red Sox | 9–2 | **Hellickson** (13–10) | Weiland (0–2) | | 38,071 | 83–66 |
| 150 | September 16 | @ Red Sox | 3–4 | Beckett (13–5) | **Shields** (15–11) | Papelbon (30) | 38,019 | 83–67 |
| 151 | September 17 | @ Red Sox | 4–3 | **Niemann** (11–7) | Lester (15–8) | **Peralta** (4) | 37,682 | 84–67 |
| 152 | September 18 | @ Red Sox | 8–5 | **McGee** (3–1) | Wakefield (7–7) | **Peralta** (5) | 37,613 | 85–67 |
| 153 | September 20 | @ Yankees | 0–5 | Nova (16–4) | **Davis** (10–10) | | 46,944 | 85–68 |
| 154 | September 21 | @ Yankees | 2–4 | Ayala (2–2) | **Shields** (15–12) | Rivera (44) | 42,755 | 85–69 |
| 155 | September 21 | @ Yankees | 2–4 | Robertson (4–0) | **McGee** (3–2) | Soriano (2) | 45,586 | 85–70 |
| 156 | September 22 | @ Yankees | 15–8 | Moore (1–0) | Colón (8–10) | | 47,470 | 86–70 |
| 157 | September 23 | Blue Jays | 1–5 | Morrow (11–11) | **Price** (12–13) | | 18,093 | 86–71 |
| 158 | September 24 | Blue Jays | 6–2 | **Torres** (1–1) | Romero (15–11) | | 27,773 | 87–71 |
| 159 | September 25 | Blue Jays | 5–2 | **Davis** (11–10) | Cecil (4–11) | Peralta (6) | 21,008 | 88–71 |
| 160 | September 26 | Yankees | 5–2 | **Shields** (16–12) | Noesí (2–2) | **Farnsworth** (24) | 18,772 | 89–71 |
| 161 | September 27 | Yankees | 5–3 | **McGee** (4–2) | Soriano (2–3) | **Farnsworth** (25) | 22,820 | 90–71 |
| 162 | September 28 | Yankees | 8–7 (12) | **McGee** (5–2) | Proctor (0–3) | | 29,518 | 91–71 |

=== Postseason ===
2011 Postseason Game Log
American League Division Series

| Game | Date | Opponent | Score | Win | Loss | Save | Location/Attendance | Series |
|---|---|---|---|---|---|---|---|---|
| 1 | September 30 | @ Rangers | 9–0 | **Moore** (1–0) | Wilson (0–1) | | Rangers Ballpark in Arlington; 50,498 | 1–0 |
| 2 | October 1 | @ Rangers | 6–8 | Holland (1–0) | **Shields** (0–1) | Feliz (1) | Rangers Ballpark in Arlington; 51,351 | 1–1 |
| 3 | October 3 | Rangers | 3–4 | Lewis (1–0) | **Price** (0–1) | Feliz (2) | Tropicana Field; 32,828 | 1–2 |
| 4 | October 4 | Rangers | 3–4 | Harrison (1–0) | **Hellickson** (0–1) | Feliz (3) | Tropicana Field; 28,299 | 1–3 |

== Statistics ==
=== Regular season ===
==== Batting ====
Note: Rk = Rank; Pos = Position; G = Games played; AB = At bats; R = Runs scored; H = Hits; 2B = Doubles; 3B = Triples; HR = Home runs; RBI = Runs batted in; SB = Stolen bases; BA = Batting average; OBP= On-Base percentage

| Rk | Pos | | Age | G | AB | R | H | 2B | 3B | HR | RBI | SB | BA | OBP |
|---|---|---|---|---|---|---|---|---|---|---|---|---|---|---|
| 1 | C | Kelly Shoppach | 31 | 87 | 221 | 23 | 39 | 3 | 0 | 11 | 22 | 0 | .176 | .268 |
| 2 | 1B | Casey Kotchman* | 28 | 146 | 500 | 44 | 153 | 24 | 2 | 10 | 48 | 2 | .306 | .378 |
| 3 | 2B | Ben Zobrist# | 30 | 156 | 588 | 99 | 158 | 46 | 6 | 20 | 91 | 19 | .269 | .353 |
| 4 | SS | Reid Brignac* | 25 | 92 | 249 | 18 | 48 | 4 | 0 | 1 | 15 | 3 | .193 | .227 |
| 5 | 3B | Evan Longoria | 25 | 133 | 483 | 78 | 118 | 26 | 1 | 31 | 99 | 3 | .244 | .355 |
| 6 | LF | Sam Fuld* | 29 | 105 | 308 | 41 | 74 | 18 | 5 | 3 | 27 | 20 | .240 | .313 |
| 7 | CF | B.J. Upton | 26 | 153 | 560 | 82 | 136 | 27 | 4 | 23 | 81 | 36 | .243 | .331 |
| 8 | RF | Matt Joyce* | 26 | 141 | 462 | 69 | 128 | 32 | 2 | 19 | 75 | 13 | .277 | .347 |
| 9 | DH | Johnny Damon* | 37 | 150 | 582 | 79 | 152 | 29 | 7 | 16 | 73 | 19 | .261 | .326 |
| 10 | IF | Sean Rodriguez | 26 | 131 | 373 | 45 | 83 | 20 | 3 | 8 | 36 | 11 | .223 | .323 |
| 11 | LF | Desmond Jennings | 24 | 63 | 247 | 44 | 64 | 9 | 4 | 10 | 25 | 20 | .259 | .356 |
| 12 | C | John Jaso* | 27 | 89 | 246 | 26 | 55 | 15 | 1 | 5 | 27 | 1 | .224 | .298 |
| 13 | SS | Elliot Johnson# | 27 | 70 | 160 | 20 | 31 | 7 | 2 | 4 | 17 | 6 | .194 | .257 |
| 14 | LF | Justin Ruggiano | 29 | 46 | 105 | 11 | 26 | 4 | 0 | 4 | 13 | 1 | .248 | .273 |
| 15 | 3B | Felipe López# | 31 | 32 | 97 | 8 | 21 | 4 | 0 | 2 | 8 | 1 | .216 | .248 |
| 16 | 1B | Dan Johnson* | 31 | 31 | 84 | 7 | 10 | 1 | 0 | 2 | 4 | 0 | .119 | .187 |
| 17 | C | Robinson Chirinos | 27 | 20 | 55 | 4 | 12 | 2 | 0 | 1 | 7 | 0 | .218 | .283 |
| 18 | UT | Brandon Guyer | 25 | 15 | 41 | 7 | 8 | 1 | 0 | 2 | 3 | 0 | .195 | .214 |
| 19 | C | José Lobatón# | 26 | 15 | 34 | 2 | 4 | 1 | 0 | 0 | 0 | 0 | .118 | .231 |
| 20 | DH | Manny Ramirez | 39 | 5 | 17 | 0 | 1 | 0 | 0 | 0 | 1 | 0 | .059 | .059 |
| 21 | DH | Russ Canzler | 25 | 3 | 3 | 0 | 1 | 0 | 0 | 0 | 1 | 0 | .333 | .400 |
| | | Pitcher totals | | 162 | 21 | 0 | 2 | 0 | 0 | 0 | 1 | 0 | .095 | .136 |
| | | Team totals | | 162 | 5436 | 707 | 1324 | 273 | 37 | 172 | 674 | 155 | .244 | .322 |

Source: Baseball-Reference.com

==== Pitching ====
Note: Rk = Rank; W = Wins; L = Losses; ERA = Earned run average; G = Games pitched; GS = Games started; CG= Complete Games; SV = Saves; IP = Innings pitched; H = Hits allowed; R = Runs allowed; ER = Earned runs allowed; BB = Walks allowed; SO = Strikeouts; K/BB= Strikeout to Walk Ratio

| Rk | | Age | W | L | ERA | G | GS | CG | SV | IP | H | R | ER | HR | BB | SO | SO/BB |
|---|---|---|---|---|---|---|---|---|---|---|---|---|---|---|---|---|---|
| 1 | James Shields | 29 | 16 | 12 | 2.82 | 33 | 33 | 11 | 0 | 249.1 | 195 | 83 | 78 | 26 | 65 | 225 | 3.46 |
| 2 | David Price* | 25 | 12 | 13 | 3.49 | 34 | 34 | 0 | 0 | 224.1 | 192 | 93 | 87 | 22 | 63 | 218 | 3.46 |
| 3 | Jeremy Hellickson | 24 | 13 | 10 | 2.95 | 29 | 29 | 2 | 0 | 189.0 | 146 | 64 | 62 | 21 | 72 | 117 | 1.63 |
| 4 | Wade Davis | 25 | 11 | 10 | 4.45 | 29 | 29 | 1 | 0 | 184.0 | 190 | 96 | 91 | 23 | 63 | 105 | 1.67 |
| 5 | Jeff Niemann | 28 | 11 | 7 | 4.06 | 23 | 23 | 1 | 0 | 135.1 | 131 | 65 | 61 | 18 | 37 | 105 | 2.84 |
| 6 | Kyle Farnsworth | 35 | 5 | 1 | 2.18 | 63 | 0 | 0 | 25 | 57.2 | 45 | 15 | 14 | 5 | 12 | 51 | 4.25 |
| 7 | Joel Peralta | 35 | 3 | 4 | 2.93 | 71 | 0 | 0 | 6 | 67.2 | 44 | 23 | 22 | 7 | 18 | 61 | 3.39 |
| 8 | Juan Cruz | 32 | 5 | 0 | 3.88 | 56 | 0 | 0 | 0 | 48.2 | 36 | 21 | 21 | 5 | 28 | 46 | 1.64 |
| 9 | Cesar Ramos* | 27 | 0 | 1 | 3.92 | 59 | 0 | 0 | 0 | 43.2 | 36 | 22 | 19 | 4 | 25 | 31 | 1.24 |
| 10 | J.P. Howell* | 28 | 2 | 3 | 6.16 | 46 | 0 | 0 | 1 | 30.2 | 30 | 24 | 21 | 5 | 18 | 26 | 1.44 |
| 11 | Alex Cobb | 23 | 3 | 2 | 3.42 | 9 | 9 | 0 | 0 | 52.2 | 49 | 21 | 20 | 3 | 21 | 37 | 1.76 |
| 12 | Brandon Gomes | 26 | 2 | 1 | 2.92 | 40 | 0 | 0 | 0 | 37.0 | 34 | 15 | 12 | 3 | 16 | 32 | 2.00 |
| 13 | Andy Sonnanstine | 28 | 0 | 2 | 5.55 | 15 | 4 | 0 | 0 | 35.2 | 40 | 22 | 22 | 10 | 12 | 12 | 1.00 |
| 14 | Adam Russell | 28 | 1 | 2 | 3.03 | 36 | 0 | 0 | 0 | 32.2 | 31 | 13 | 11 | 2 | 20 | 13 | 0.65 |
| 15 | Jake McGee* | 24 | 5 | 2 | 4.50 | 37 | 0 | 0 | 0 | 28.0 | 30 | 14 | 14 | 5 | 12 | 27 | 2.25 |
| 16 | Matt Moore* | 22 | 1 | 0 | 2.89 | 3 | 1 | 0 | 0 | 9.1 | 9 | 3 | 3 | 1 | 3 | 15 | 5.00 |
| 17 | Alexander Torres* | 23 | 1 | 1 | 3.38 | 4 | 0 | 0 | 0 | 8.0 | 8 | 4 | 3 | 0 | 7 | 9 | 1.29 |
| 18 | Dane De La Rosa | 28 | 0 | 0 | 9.82 | 7 | 0 | 0 | 0 | 7.1 | 10 | 8 | 8 | 1 | 3 | 8 | 2.67 |
| 19 | Rob Delaney | 26 | 0 | 0 | 10.80 | 4 | 0 | 0 | 0 | 5.0 | 4 | 6 | 6 | 0 | 7 | 3 | 0.43 |
| 20 | Jay Buente | 27 | 0 | 0 | 9.00 | 1 | 0 | 0 | 0 | 2.0 | 2 | 2 | 2 | 0 | 2 | 1 | 0.50 |
| 21 | Mike Ekstrom | 27 | 0 | 0 | 0.00 | 1 | 0 | 0 | 0 | 1.0 | 1 | 0 | 0 | 0 | 0 | 1 | ---- |
| | Team totals | | 91 | 71 | 3.58 | 162 | 162 | 15 | 32 | 1449.0 | 1263 | 614 | 577 | 161 | 504 | 1143 | 2.27 |

Source: Baseball-Reference.com

== American League Division Series vs. Texas ==
=== Game 1, September 30 ===
5:07 p.m. (EDT) at Rangers Ballpark in Arlington in Arlington, Texas

| Team | 1 | 2 | 3 | 4 | 5 | 6 | 7 | 8 | 9 | R | H | E |
|---|---|---|---|---|---|---|---|---|---|---|---|---|
| Tampa Bay | 0 | 3 | 3 | 0 | 2 | 0 | 0 | 0 | 1 | 9 | 11 | 0 |
| Texas | 0 | 0 | 0 | 0 | 0 | 0 | 0 | 0 | 0 | 0 | 2 | 1 |
Starting pitchers: TB: Matt Moore (0–0); TEX: C. J. Wilson (0–0); WP: Matt Moore (1–0) LP: C. J. Wilson (0–1); Home runs: TB: Johnny Damon (1), Kelly Shoppach 2 (2); TEX: None

=== Game 2, October 1 ===
7:07 p.m. (EDT) at Rangers Ballpark in Arlington in Arlington, Texas

| Team | 1 | 2 | 3 | 4 | 5 | 6 | 7 | 8 | 9 | R | H | E |
|---|---|---|---|---|---|---|---|---|---|---|---|---|
| Tampa Bay | 1 | 0 | 0 | 2 | 0 | 0 | 3 | 0 | 0 | 6 | 9 | 0 |
| Texas | 0 | 0 | 0 | 5 | 0 | 2 | 0 | 1 | X | 8 | 10 | 1 |
Starting pitchers: TB: James Shields (0–0); TEX: Derek Holland (0–0); WP: Derek Holland (1–0) LP: James Shields (0–1) Sv: Neftalí Feliz (1); Home runs: TB: Matt Joyce (1), Evan Longoria (1); TEX: Mitch Moreland (1)

=== Game 3, October 3 ===
5:07 p.m. (EDT) at Tropicana Field in St. Petersburg, Florida

| Team | 1 | 2 | 3 | 4 | 5 | 6 | 7 | 8 | 9 | R | H | E |
|---|---|---|---|---|---|---|---|---|---|---|---|---|
| Texas | 0 | 0 | 0 | 0 | 0 | 0 | 4 | 0 | 0 | 4 | 9 | 0 |
| Tampa Bay | 0 | 0 | 0 | 1 | 0 | 0 | 1 | 1 | 0 | 3 | 6 | 0 |
Starting pitchers: TEX: Colby Lewis (0–0); TB: David Price (0–0); WP: Colby Lewis (1–0) LP: David Price (0–1) Sv: Neftalí Feliz (2); Home runs: TEX: Mike Napoli (1); TB: Desmond Jennings 2 (2)

=== Game 4, October 4 ===
2:07 p.m. (EDT) at Tropicana Field in St. Petersburg, Florida

| Team | 1 | 2 | 3 | 4 | 5 | 6 | 7 | 8 | 9 | R | H | E |
|---|---|---|---|---|---|---|---|---|---|---|---|---|
| Texas | 1 | 1 | 0 | 1 | 0 | 0 | 1 | 0 | 0 | 4 | 6 | 0 |
| Tampa Bay | 0 | 1 | 0 | 1 | 0 | 0 | 0 | 0 | 1 | 3 | 7 | 0 |
WP: Matt Harrison (1-0) LP: Jeremy Hellickson (0-1) Sv: Neftalí Feliz (3); Home runs: TEX: Ian Kinsler (1), Adrián Beltré 3 (3); TB: None

== Farm system ==
| Level | Team | League | Manager |
|---|---|---|---|
| AAA | Durham Bulls | International League | Charlie Montoyo |
| AA | Montgomery Biscuits | Southern League | Billy Gardner Jr. |
| A | Charlotte Stone Crabs | Florida State League | Jim Morrison |
| A | Bowling Green Hot Rods | Midwest League | Brady Williams |
| A-Short Season | Hudson Valley Renegades | New York–Penn League | Jared Sandberg |
| Rookie | Princeton Rays | Appalachian League | Mike Johns |
| Rookie | GCL Rays | Gulf Coast League | Joe Alvarez |
