= Chris Jakubauskas =

American baseball player (born 1978)

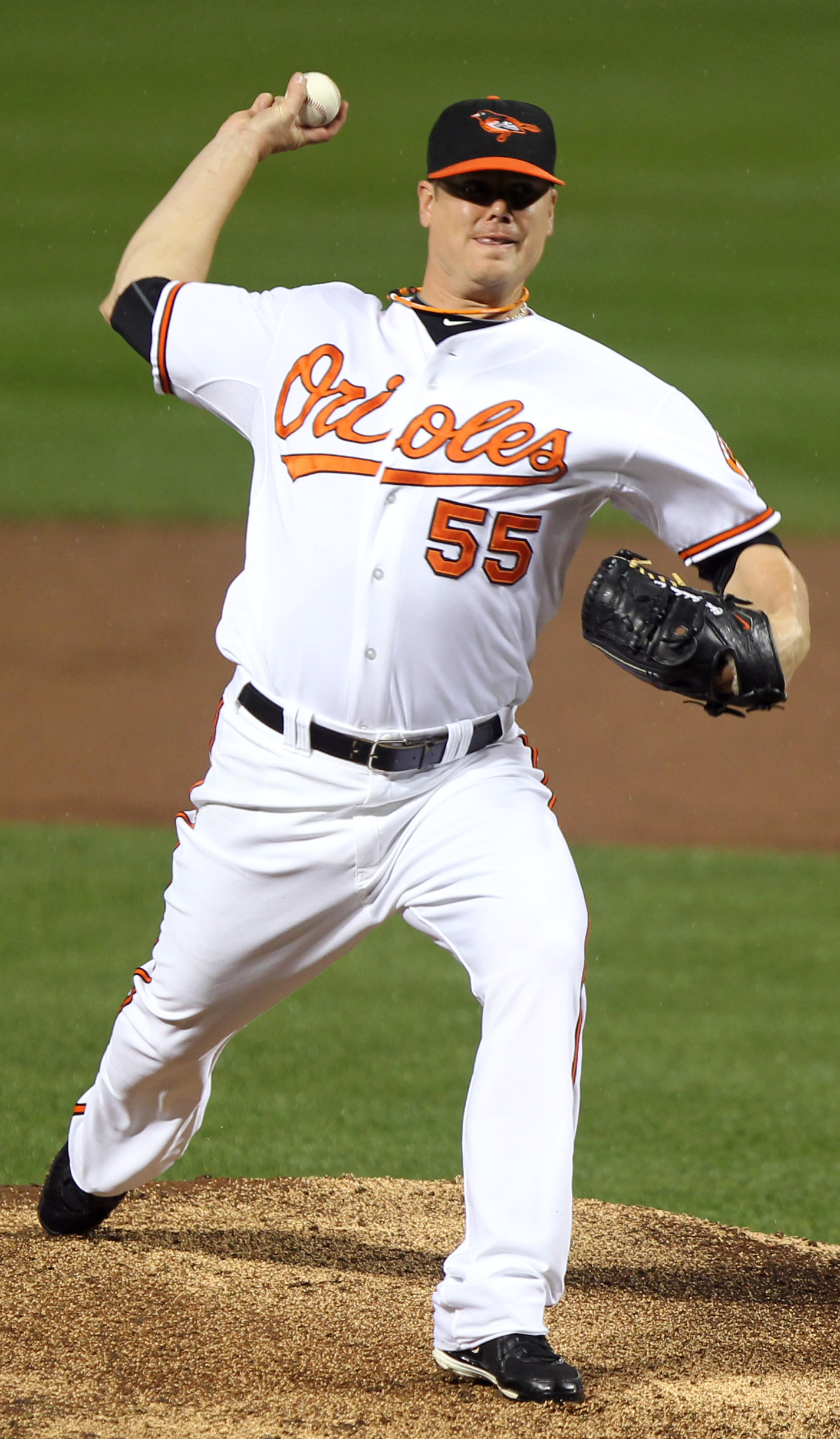
- Jakubauskas with the Baltimore Orioles
- Pitcher
- Born: December 22, 1978 (age 47); Upland, California, U.S.
- Batted: Right Threw: Right

MLB debut
- April 8, 2009, for the Seattle Mariners

Last MLB appearance
- September 25, 2011, for the Baltimore Orioles

MLB statistics
- Win–loss record: 8–10
- Earned run average: 5.58
- Strikeouts: 99
- Stats at Baseball Reference

Teams
- Seattle Mariners (2009); Pittsburgh Pirates (2010); Baltimore Orioles (2011)

Christopher James Jakubauskas (born December 22, 1978) is an American former professional baseball pitcher. He played in Major League Baseball (MLB) for the Seattle Mariners, Pittsburgh Pirates, and Baltimore Orioles.

== College career ==
Jakubauskas played first base at Oklahoma. After college, he was an assistant coach for the Los Osos High School varsity baseball team during the 2004–05 season while his arm was recovering from Tommy John surgery.

== Professional career ==
=== Independent leagues ===
Jakubauskas pitched for several independent league teams, including the Lincoln Saltdogs of the American Association of Independent Professional Baseball, the Florence Freedom, of the Frontier League, and the Fullerton Flyers of the Golden Baseball League.

=== Seattle Mariners ===
Jakubauskas was acquired by the Seattle Mariners organization on June 13, 2007 and assigned to the Double-A West Tenn Diamond Jaxx. He struck out eight batters on August 31 against the Chattanooga Lookouts. In 16 games, three starts, Jakubauskas went 0–4 with 39 strikeouts and a 4.94 ERA in 51 innings pitched.

In 2008 Jakubauskas played for three different levels in the Mariners organization, the Short-Season Everett AquaSox, the Double-A Diamond Jaxx and the Triple-A Tacoma Rainiers. He started the season in West Tennessee but was soon promoted to Tacoma on May 6. He allowed three earned run or less in all of his nine starts, while tossing at least five innings in seven games. Jakubauskas struck out a season-high eight batters twice, the first on May 31 against the Salt Lake City Bees and the other on September 1 against the Portland Beavers. He limited opponents to a .243 average, including a .196 clip against lefties. He made two stints on the disabled list, the first was from June 13 to July 2 with a strained right shoulder and the second time was July 7 from August 27 with a strained left oblique muscle. In his rehab assignment with Everett from August 22 to the 27 Jakubauskas allowed one hit and striking out seven in 2 2/3 scoreless inning on August 22 against the Salem-Keizer Volcanoes. Jakubauskas also pitched for Lara in the Venezuelan Winter League where he went 4–5 with a 5.16.

On April 4, 2009 it was announced that Jakubauskas had made the Mariners' Opening Day roster. Jakubauskas won his first Major League game, coming into the game in the 4th inning replacing Ryan Rowland-Smith on April 10. Jakubauskas pitched two innings giving up two runs, but maintaining a 5–4 lead as he exited the game. The win also resulted in the first save for fellow Mariner reliever David Aardsma. On August 22, the Mariners purchased the contract of right-hander Randy Messenger from the minors and optioned Jakubauskas to the Triple-A Tacoma Rainiers. Jakubauskas soon made a return to Seattle and finished the season on the major league roster was 6–7 with a 5.28 ERA for the club, seeing time both as starter and reliever.

=== Pittsburgh Pirates ===
Jakubauskas was claimed off waivers by the Pittsburgh Pirates on November 20, 2009. After beginning the 2010 season as a starting pitcher with the Indianapolis Indians, he was recalled by the Pirates on April 23, and made his debut with the ball club the following night in a 5–2 defeat to the Houston Astros at Minute Maid Park. With a runner at first base and two outs in the bottom half of the first inning of that game, he was hit on the back of the head, just above the right ear, by a line drive batted by Lance Berkman. Even though he never lost consciousness, Jakubauskas suffered both a concussion and a head contusion.

He was released by the team on November 4, 2010.

=== Baltimore Orioles ===
Jakubauskas signed a minor league contract with the Baltimore Orioles on February 1, 2011. He began the 2011 season with the Norfolk Tides after not making the major league roster out of spring training. He replaced the optioned Brad Bergesen after the Orioles selected his contract from the Tides on April 9. He made three relief appearances before a strained right groin sent him to the 15-day disabled list on April 18. Once activated off the disabled list, he was optioned back to the Tides on May 2. After another shuttle between Baltimore and Norfolk within a two-day span later that month, he finally began an extended stay with the Orioles when he was recalled on May 30.

He earned his first win with the Orioles after pitching five shutout innings in a 4–0 victory over the Oakland Athletics at Camden Yards on June 7. It was his first start since the on-field accident in Houston the previous season. He has earned a spot on Baltimore's five-man starting rotation during the season. On October 30, he declared for free agency.

=== Arizona Diamondbacks ===
Jakubauskas signed a minor league contract with the Arizona Diamondbacks on November 8, 2011. In 18 games (7 starts) for the Triple-A Reno Aces, he logged a 2-3 record and 4.18 ERA with 28 strikeouts across 51 2/3 innings pitched. Jakubauskas was released by the Diamondbacks organization on July 5, 2012.

=== Toronto Blue Jays ===
On July 7, 2012, Jakubauskas signed a minor league contractwith the Toronto Blue Jays, and was assigned to the Double-A New Hampshire Fisher Cats. On July 26, Jakubauskas was promoted to the Jays' Triple-A affiliate, the Las Vegas 51s. He elected free agency following the season on November 3.

=== Milwaukee Brewers ===
On December 3, 2012, Jakubauskas signed a minor league contract with the Milwaukee Brewers. He appeared in 8 games for the Triple-A Nashville Sounds before he was released on May 21, 2013.

=== Cleveland Indians ===
On May 31, 2013, Jakubauskas signed a minor league contract with the Cleveland Indians. In 11 appearances for the Triple-A Columbus Clippers, he posted a 3.86 ERA with 13 strikeouts across 14 innings pitched. Jakubauskas was released by the Indians organization on July 5.

Jakubauskas retired from professional baseball on January 3, 2014.
