= Blake Davis (baseball) =

American baseball player (born 1983)

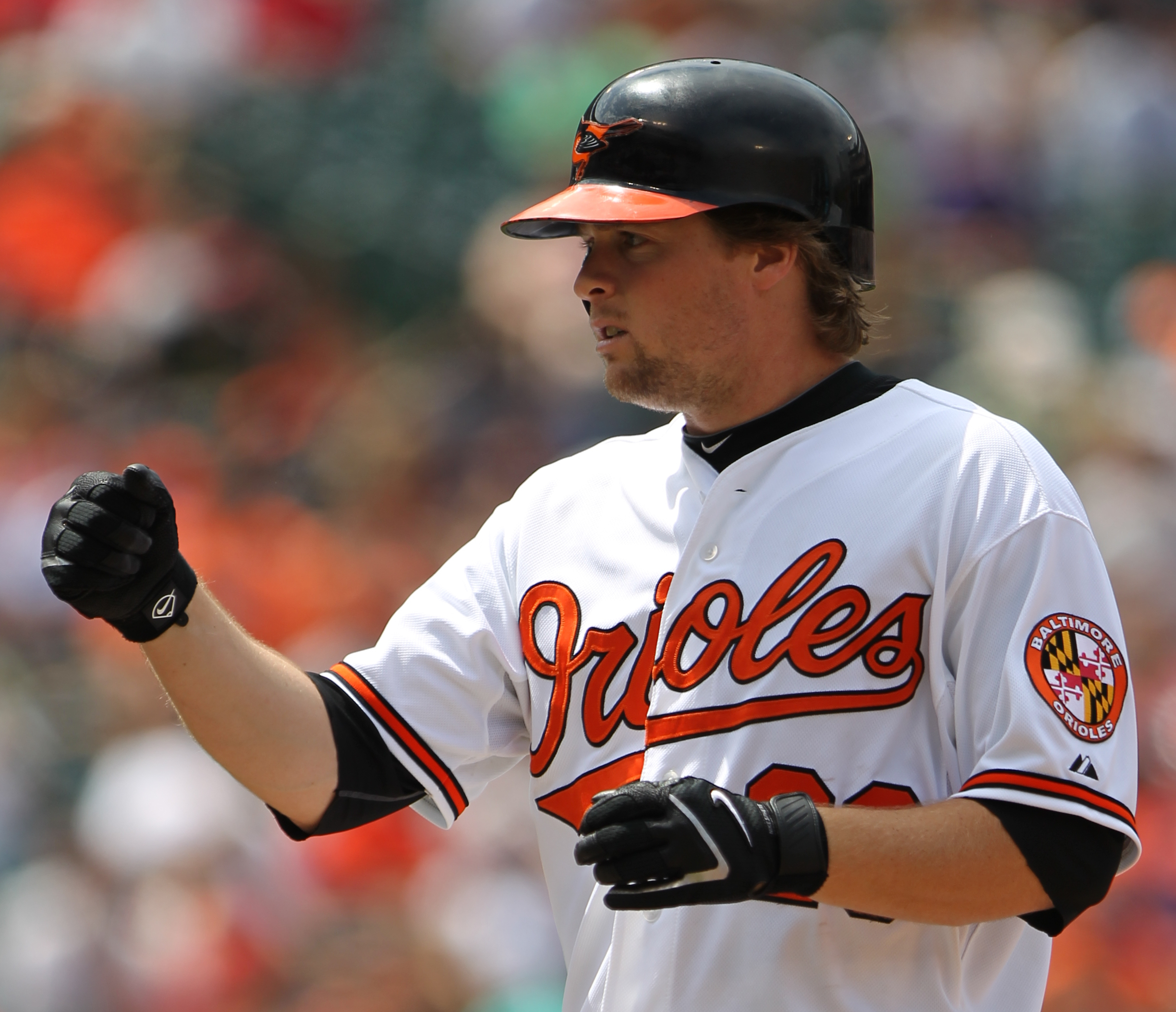
- Davis with the Baltimore Orioles
- Infielder
- Born: December 22, 1983 (age 42); Newport Beach, California, U.S.
- Batted: Left Threw: Right

MLB debut
- June 22, 2011, for the Baltimore Orioles

Last appearance
- August 21, 2011, for the Baltimore Orioles

MLB statistics
- Batting average: .254
- Home Runs: 1
- Runs Batted In: 6
- Stats at Baseball Reference

Teams
- Baltimore Orioles (2011)

Blake Jonathan Davis (born December 22, 1983) is an American former professional baseball infielder and outfielder, who played in Major League Baseball (MLB) for the Baltimore Orioles in 2011.

== Early life ==
=== High school ===
Davis attended Fountain Valley High School in Fountain Valley, California. Competing in the vaunted California Interscholastic Federation (CIF), he primarily played shortstop and led the school in hits and assists.

As a senior, Davis earned first-team All-Sunset League, second-team All-Orange County, and second-team All-CIF honors. That year, he batted .376, while posting 14 stolen bases, in helping the Barons to the league title and the CIF quarterfinals. Davis had already achieved a first-team all-league and second-team all-county pick as a junior, when he hit .459 and set single-season school records for hits (45) and assists (83).

=== College ===
Davis played college baseball for California State University, Fullerton. In 2003 (his freshman year), he was granted a redshirt season.

In 2004, Davis played shortstop in 41 games (32 of them as a starter). He hit .295 on the year, collecting 10 multiple-hit games, including two three-hit games, where he collected four runs batted in (RBI) — one on Apr. 9 vs. Pacific and the other in the Regional-clinching win over Pepperdine on June 6. Davis had a six-game hitting streak from Mar. 13 to Mar. 24, hitting .381 (8-for-21) over that span. He was 16-for-46 (.348) with runners in scoring position (RISP) and collected 13 of his 21 RBI with two outs. Davis also led the team with a .600 average (9-for-15) when leading off an inning.

In 2005, Davis emerged as the full-time Titan shortstop. He played in 62 games (starting 51) and hitting a majority of the time in the leadoff spot. Davis hit .325 on the year, good for third-best on the team, and 15th in the Big West Conference. He was ranked fifth in the conference with 50 runs scored and second with eight triples (ranking second all-time in single-season triples, in Fullerton’s record book). Davis led the Titans with 17 stolen bases (in 19 attempts), finishing just behind Cal Poly's Brandon Roberts (20) for the top conference spot. Davis also matched his career-high two home runs in 2005 (one of which was his first-ever grand slam on Feb. 27 at UNLV). Davis’ longest hitting streak lasted seven games (from May 22 to June 6), where he hit .358 (10-for-28) over that span. Davis tallied 20 multiple-hit games, collecting three hits on eight occasions and four hits on May 1, where he went 4-for-5, with 4 RBI, while scoring four runs against UC Santa Barbara. Davis tied a career-high with four RBI on two occasions (Feb. 27 vs. UNLV and May 1 vs. UC Santa Barbara). He moved over to play as a second baseman for an injured Justin Turner in two games, on April 8–9. Davis tallied a team-high 8 assists on May 3 vs. San Diego State. He earned first-team All-Big West recognition and was also a member of the Fullerton Regional all-tournament team. Davis earned second-team, ABCA/Rawlings West Region honors. He was drafted in the 46th round (1,377th overall) by the Cleveland Indians in the 2005 Major League Baseball draft, but elected not to sign.

In July, 2005 Davis became the Titans' 15th player to play with the US National team. While playing with the US National team, he started 16 games (playing in 20 games overall), hit .275, with two triples, and four RBI. He had two stolen bases (on four attempts). Davis also led the team in assists with 58.

In 2006, Davis played in 64 games, while hitting .351 on the year. He had 15 stolen bases (in 22 attempts), 13 doubles, 5 triples, and his collegiate career-high 5 home runs. Davis also had 39 RBI on the year.

== Professional baseball ==
=== Baltimore Orioles ===
==== Minor leagues ====
Davis was drafted in the 4th round (115th overall) of the 2006 Major League Baseball draft by the Baltimore Orioles, becoming Cal State Fullerton's highest MLB draft choice that year.

Although Davis had played shortstop almost his entire career, he was moved to right field for the 2011 season with Triple-A Norfolk and played about 70% of the time at that position.

==== Major leagues ====
On June 18, 2011, Davis got his chance when he was called up to the major leagues, to replace Ryan Adams. On August 13, while playing at Camden Yards against the Detroit Tigers, Davis hit his first (and only) MLB home run, after umpire review: Crew chief Jeff Nelson watched the replay and upheld the call.

=== Long Island ===
Davis signed with the Long Island Ducks of the Atlantic League of Professional Baseball for the 2015 season. He became a free agent after the season.

== Personal life ==
Davis’ parents are Samuel and Cynthia Davis; he has one older brother (Bryan) and one older sister (Crissy). Blake Davis majored in Communications while at Cal State Fullerton. He has two different colored eyes. Davis lists God as his greatest influence in life. Davis married his high school sweetheart, Rayanne Bearden, on November 13, 2010.
