= Russ Canzler =

American baseball player (born 1986)

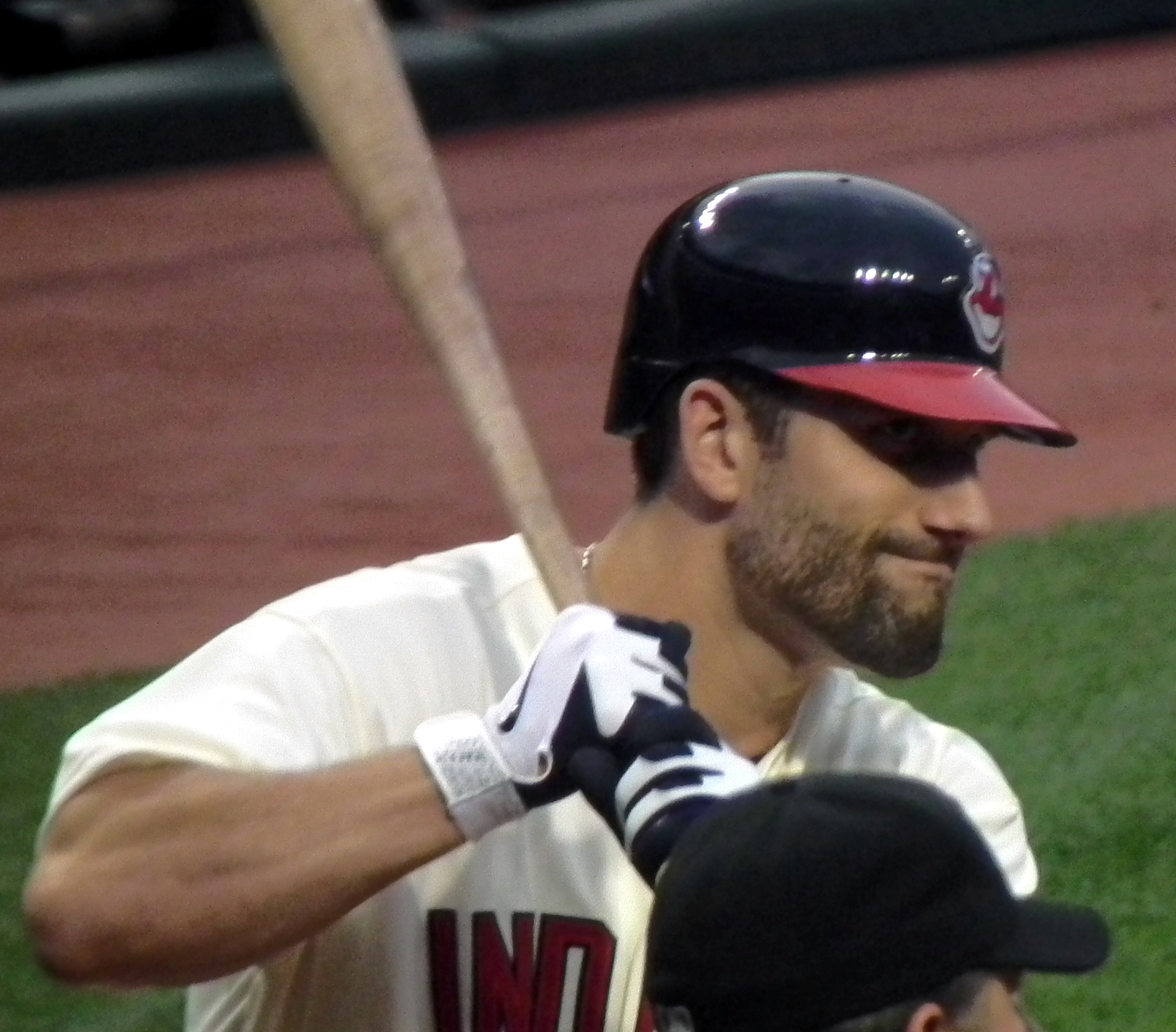
- Canzler with the Cleveland Indians
- Third baseman
- Born: April 11, 1986 (age 40); Berwick, Pennsylvania, U.S.
- Batted: Right Threw: Right

MLB debut
- September 15, 2011, for the Tampa Bay Rays

Last appearance
- October 3, 2012, for the Cleveland Indians

MLB statistics
- Batting average: .271
- Home runs: 3
- Runs batted in: 12
- Stats at Baseball Reference

Teams
- Tampa Bay Rays (2011); Cleveland Indians (2012)

Career highlights and awards
- International League MVP (2011)

Russell Michael Canzler (born April 11, 1986) is an American former professional baseball third baseman. He played in Major League Baseball (MLB) for the Tampa Bay Rays and Cleveland Indians from 2011 to 2012.

== Professional career ==
=== Chicago Cubs ===
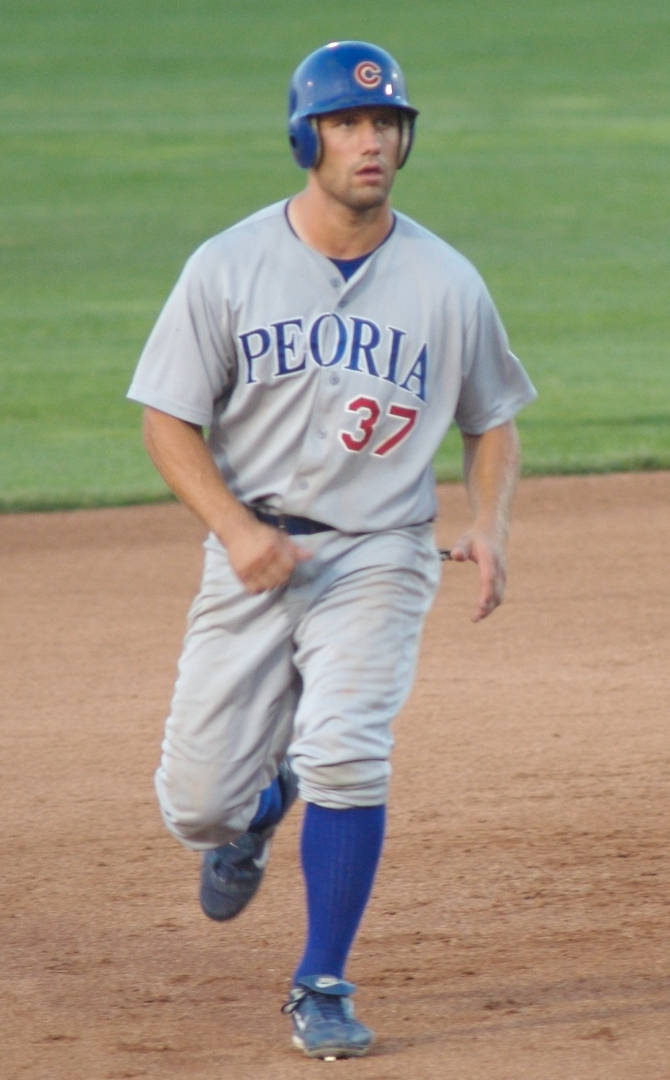
Canzler playing for the Peoria Chiefs, single-A affiliates of the Chicago Cubs, in 2007

Canzler was drafted by the Chicago Cubs in the 30th round of the 2004 MLB draft out of Hazleton Area School District. He played in the Cubs organization from 2004 to 2010.

=== Tampa Bay Rays ===
Before the 2011 season, in his first year of free agency, he signed a minor league deal with the Tampa Bay Rays, saying later he thought it gave him the best chance to make the major leagues. He was the 2011 International League MVP after hitting .314/.401/.530 with 18 home runs and 83 runs batted in (RBIs) in 131 games.

Canzler fulfilled his goal in signing with the Rays when was called up to the majors for the first time on September 11, 2011.

=== Cleveland Indians ===
Canzler was traded to the Cleveland Indians on January 31, 2012 in exchange for cash considerations. Canzler was designated for assignment on December 19, 2012 to make room on the 40-man roster for Mark Reynolds.

=== Baltimore Orioles ===
The Toronto Blue Jays claimed Canzler off waivers from the Cleveland Indians on December 21, 2012. Cleveland reacquired Canzler off waivers from Toronto on January 2, 2013, then the New York Yankees claimed him off waivers from the Indians a day later on January 4, 2013. The Yankees designated Canzler for assignment on February 1, when they signed Travis Hafner. He was claimed off waivers by the Baltimore Orioles on February 5, 2013.

=== Pittsburgh Pirates ===
On July 12, 2013, Canzler was traded to the Pittsburgh Pirates in exchange for Tim Alderson. He was designated for assignment by the Pirates on August 27.

=== New York Yankees ===
Canzler signed a minor league contract with the New York Yankees on November 23, 2013. He made 51 appearances for the Triple-A Scranton/Wilkes-Barre RailRiders, slashing .263/.332/.389 with two home runs, 24 RBI, and one stolen base. On June 20, 2014, Canzler was released by the Yankees organization.

=== Philadelphia Phillies ===
Canzler signed a minor league contract with the Philadelphia Phillies on June 26, 2014, and was assigned to the Phillies' Triple-A affiliate, the Lehigh Valley IronPigs.

On November 13, 2014, Canzler was re-signed by the Phillies. He elected free agency on November 6, 2015.
