= Ryan Adams (baseball) =

American baseball player (born 1987)

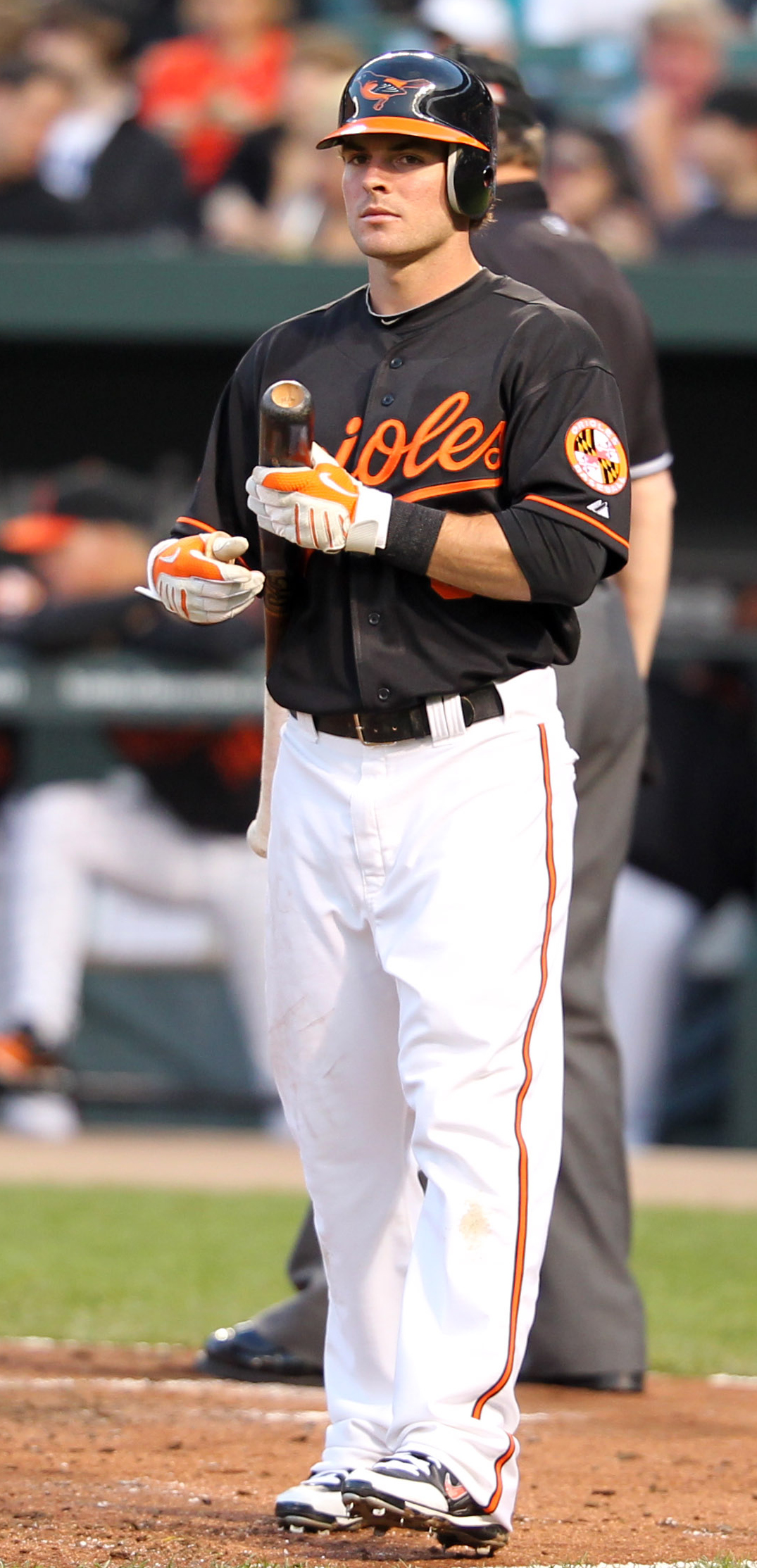
- Adams with the Baltimore Orioles
- Second baseman
- Born: April 21, 1987 (age 39); New Orleans, Louisiana, U.S.
- Batted: Right Threw: Right

MLB debut
- May 20, 2011, for the Baltimore Orioles

Last MLB appearance
- September 19, 2011, for the Baltimore Orioles

MLB statistics
- Batting average: .281
- Home runs: 0
- Runs batted in: 7
- Stats at Baseball Reference

Teams
- Baltimore Orioles (2011)

Ryan Scott Adams (born April 21, 1987) is a former professional baseball second baseman. He previously played in Major League Baseball with the Baltimore Orioles.

== Career ==
=== Baltimore Orioles ===
Adams was drafted by the Baltimore Orioles in the 2nd round of the 2006 MLB draft out of Jesuit High School in New Orleans, Louisiana.

He began his professional career with the Bluefield Orioles of the Rookie-class Appalachian League in 2006 before being promoted late in the season to the Aberdeen IronBirds of the Short-season "A" New York–Penn League, where he remained for 2007, hitting .236 in 67 games.

In 2008, he hit .308 in 119 games with 11 homers and 57 RBI for the Delmarva Shorebirds of the South Atlantic League and in 2009, he hit .288 in 59 games for the Frederick Keys of the Carolina League.

Adams was promoted to the AA Eastern League for 2010 and hit .298 with 15 homers and 68 RBI in 134 games for the Bowie Baysox.

He began 2011 with the Norfolk Tides of the AAA International League and was called up to the majors for the first time on May 20, 2011. He had one hit in four at-bats in his debut, with his hit being a single to left field off Jason Marquis of the Washington Nationals. In 29 games with the Orioles, he had 25 hits in 89 at-bats for a .281 batting average.

He returned to Norfolk to finish the season and also spent most of 2012 there while battling injuries. In 159 games in AAA over the two seasons, he hit .224 in 65 games.

He became a free agent after the 2012 season. Shortly thereafter, Adams tested positive for amphetamines and was suspended for 25 games by Major League Baseball. He did not play at all in 2013.

=== Los Angeles Dodgers ===
In January 2014, Adams signed a minor league deal with the Los Angeles Dodgers, where he hit .312/.372/.432 in 44 games with the Double-A Chattanooga Lookouts. Despite strong numbers, Adams battled injuries throughout his time with the club, and the Dodgers released him on July 9. A week later, Major League Baseball announced another suspension, this time for 100 games, after Adams violated the Minor League drug prevention and treatment program.

=== New Jersey Jackals ===
After his suspension went into effect, Adams signed on with the New Jersey Jackals of the Canadian–American League. In a short stint, he sustained the strong numbers he had put up with the Lookouts, batting .300/.364/.450 in 11 games.

=== Sugar Land Skeeters ===
On June 28, 2015, it was announced that Adams had signed with the Sugar Land Skeeters of the Atlantic League of Professional Baseball. In 7 games, he batted .100 (3-for-30). He was released on July 28.
