= Brad Bergesen =

American baseball player & coach (born 1985)

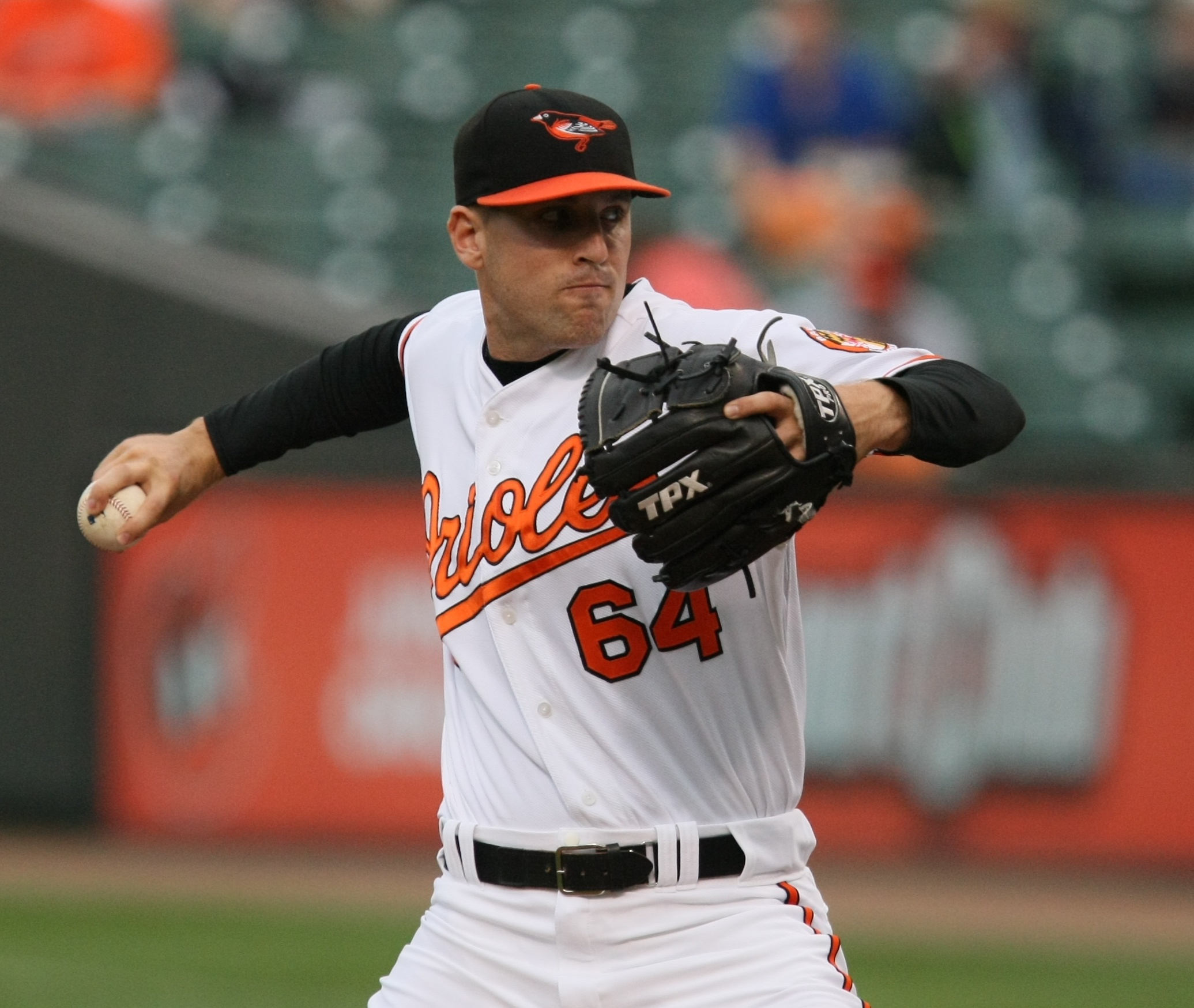
- Bergesen with the Baltimore Orioles in 2009
- Pitcher
- Born: September 25, 1985 (age 40); Concord, California, U.S.
- Batted: Left Threw: Right

Professional debut
- MLB: April 21, 2009, for the Baltimore Orioles
- NPB: April 2, 2013, for the Chunichi Dragons

Last appearance
- MLB: October 1, 2012, for the Arizona Diamondbacks
- NPB: July 26, 2013, for the Chunichi Dragons

MLB statistics
- Win–loss record: 19–25
- Earned run average: 4.61
- Strikeouts: 225

NPB statistics
- Win–loss record: 2–2
- Earned run average: 3.71
- Strikeouts: 22
- Stats at Baseball Reference

Teams
- Baltimore Orioles (2009–2011); Arizona Diamondbacks (2012); Chunichi Dragons (2013)

Bradley Steven Bergesen (born September 25, 1985) is an American former professional baseball pitcher. He played in Major League Baseball (MLB) for the Baltimore Orioles and Arizona Diamondbacks, and in Nippon Professional Baseball (NPB) for the Chunichi Dragons. He has been a pitching coach in the Philadelphia Phillies organization since 2018, currently with the Reading Fightin Phils since 2025.

== Playing career ==
=== Baltimore Orioles ===
Bergesen was called up to the Baltimore Orioles from the Triple-A Norfolk Tides to make his first major-league start on April 21, 2009. He pitched 5 2/3 innings for the win against the Chicago White Sox, allowing three runs (one earned) on four hits and two walks, striking out four. Bergesen's starts for the next month would be much rockier, as his ERA quickly increased and sat at 5.49 after a start on May 24.

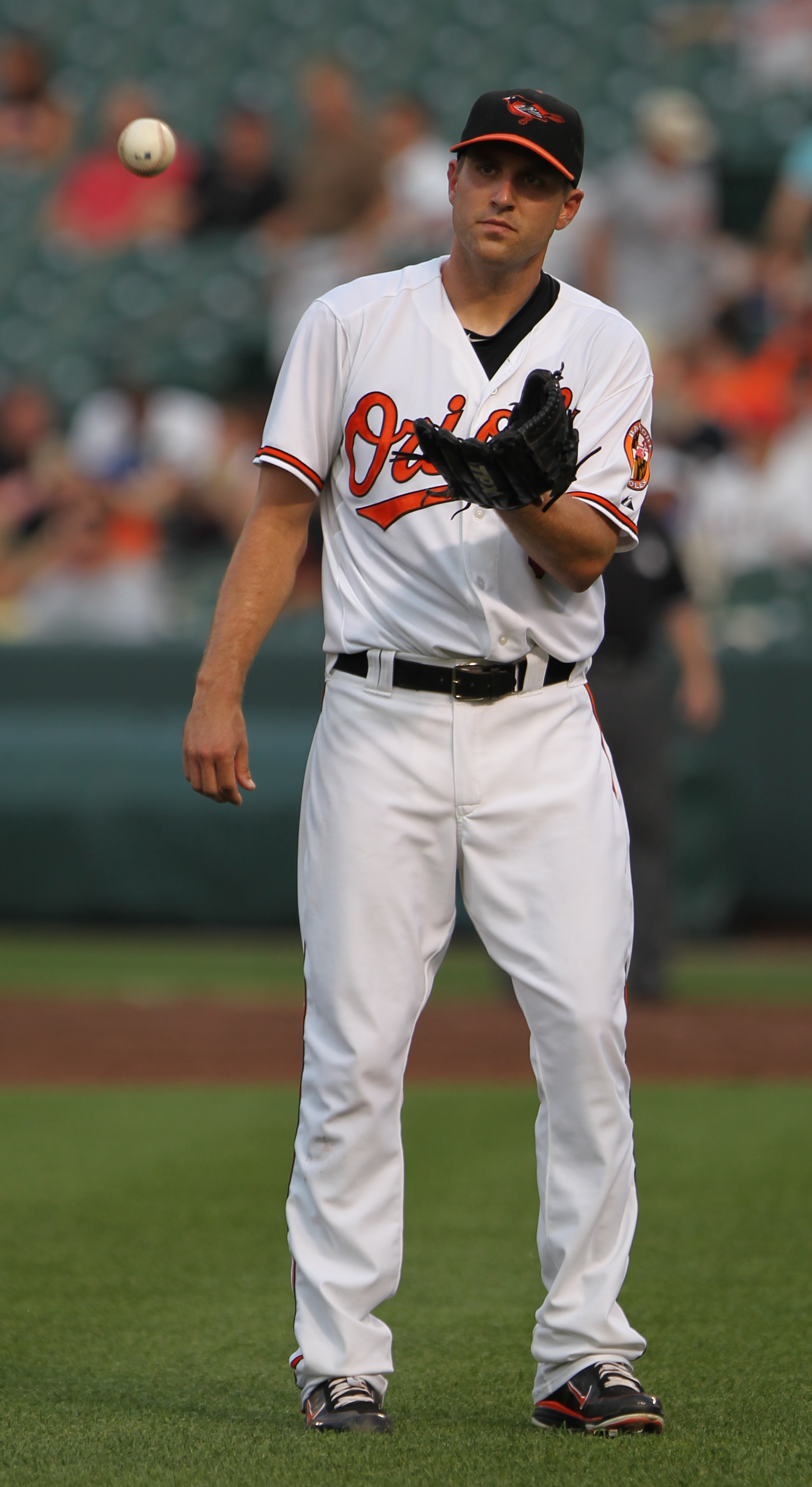

Bergesen's year turned around dramatically at this point. From May 29 through July 30 (a span of 12 starts), he pitched at least six innings each start and allowed more than three earned runs only once. He had a particularly impressive stretch from May 29 to June 14, when over four starts he pitched 32 innings and allowed just six runs (an ERA of only 1.69). The start on June 14 was his first career complete game, an 11–2 victory over the Atlanta Braves.

Bergesen continued to pitch well over the course of the year, emerging as the Orioles' most dependable starting pitcher as the summer continued. Unfortunately for the Orioles, his final start would be on July 30, against the Kansas City Royals. Bergesen was pitching another solid game, having allowed only one run thus far, and was one out away from getting out of a jam in the seventh inning when the Royals' Billy Butler hit a line drive straight into Bergesen's left shin. Bergesen collapsed immediately upon being hit, and the ball rolled back towards Orioles catcher Matt Wieters, who threw Butler out at first. Bergesen managed to get up quickly, slap gloves with Wieters, and hobble into the Orioles' dugout unassisted before collapsing in the tunnel. X-rays and an MRI did not reveal any bone fracture, but the injury would end Bergesen's season.

Bergesen finished the 2009 season with 19 starts, 123 1/3 innings pitched, a WHIP of 1.28, and an ERA of 3.43. Many writers have suggested that if Bergesen had continued to pitch as well as he had and had not been injured, he would have been a strong candidate for Rookie of the Year.

On April 20, 2010, Bergesen was optioned to Norfolk.

On May 14, 2011, Bergesen threw a complete-game shutout of the Tampa Bay Rays. Bergesen did not allow a single base hit throughout the last six innings of the game. It was his fourth career complete game, but it was his first complete-game shutout of his career.

On May 29, 2011, Bergesen was optioned to Triple-A Norfolk, giving up his spot in his rotation to Brian Matusz.

In June, he returned to MLB in a relief role in exchange for Jeremy Accardo.

Bergesen was designated for assignment on May 12, 2012, he cleared waivers and was sent outright to Triple-A on May 17. He was later re-added to the 40-man roster on July 17, but was designated for assignment again the next day.

=== Arizona Diamondbacks ===
On July 20, 2012, he was claimed off waivers by the Arizona Diamondbacks. He was released on November 28.

=== Chunichi Dragons ===
On November 30, 2012, he signed with the Chunichi Dragons of Nippon Professional Baseball. In 14 appearances (11 starts), Bergesen was 2–2 with a 3.71 ERA, but he posted a meager 3.7 strikeouts per 9 innings.

=== York Revolution ===
On May 22, 2015, After sitting out the 2014 season, Bergesen signed with the York Revolution of the Atlantic League of Professional Baseball. He became a free agent after the 2015 season. In 10 games 8.1 innings of relief he went 0-0 with a 3.24 ERA with 5 strikeouts and 1 save.

=== Lancaster Barnstormers ===
On February 28, 2017, After sitting out the 2016 season, Bergesen signed with the Lancaster Barnstormers of the Atlantic League of Professional Baseball. He became a free agent following the season. In 25 starts 136.2 innings he went 9-9 with a 4.74 ERA with 84 strikeouts.

== Coaching career ==
Bergesen was hired by the Philadelphia Phillies to be the pitching coach with the Single-A Lakewood BlueClaws for the 2018 season. He was promoted in a similar capacity to the High-A Clearwater Threshers in 2019 and the Double-A Reading Fightin Phils beginning in 2020.

Bergesen was named pitching coach for the High-A affiliate Jersey Shore BlueClaws for the 2024 season. On February 7, 2025, Bergesen was named as the pitching coach for Double-Reading.

== Pitching style ==
Brad Bergesen is a finesse pitcher and groundball pitcher who relies primarily on a sinker (sinking/two-seam fastball). He also uses a slider and changeup, the slider being his typical strikeout pitch.

Because his fastball averages a speed of about 89 mph, Bergesen relies on good control of his pitches and avoids walks, rather than striking many batters out. His ability to get many ground balls (50.1% ground ball rate in 2009) helps him limit hits to singles and get extra outs via the double play. Though he still allows many home runs.
