= 2011 New York Yankees season =

Season for the Major League Baseball team the New York Yankees

2011 New York Yankees
- American League East champions
- League: American League
- Division: East
- Ballpark: Yankee Stadium
- City: New York, New York
- Record: 97–65 (.599)
- Divisional place: 1st
- Owners: Yankee Global Enterprises
- General managers: Brian Cashman
- Managers: Joe Girardi
- Television: YES Network; WWOR-TV (Michael Kay, Ken Singleton, Paul O'Neill, David Cone, John Flaherty, Al Leiter, and several others as analysts)
- Radio: New York Yankees Radio Network (John Sterling, Suzyn Waldman)

The 2011 New York Yankees season was the 109th season for the New York Yankees franchise. The Yankees began the season at home against the Detroit Tigers on Thursday, March 31. The Yankees clinched a playoff berth in the first game of a doubleheader on September 21, and clinched the American League East title in the second game. The Yankees season ended on October 6 when they lost a deciding Game 5 of the 2011 American League Division Series to the Detroit Tigers 3–2. It was the first time since 2007 that the Yankees lost an elimination game at home.

The 2011 season was the final season in the playing career of longtime Yankees catcher Jorge Posada.

== Offseason ==
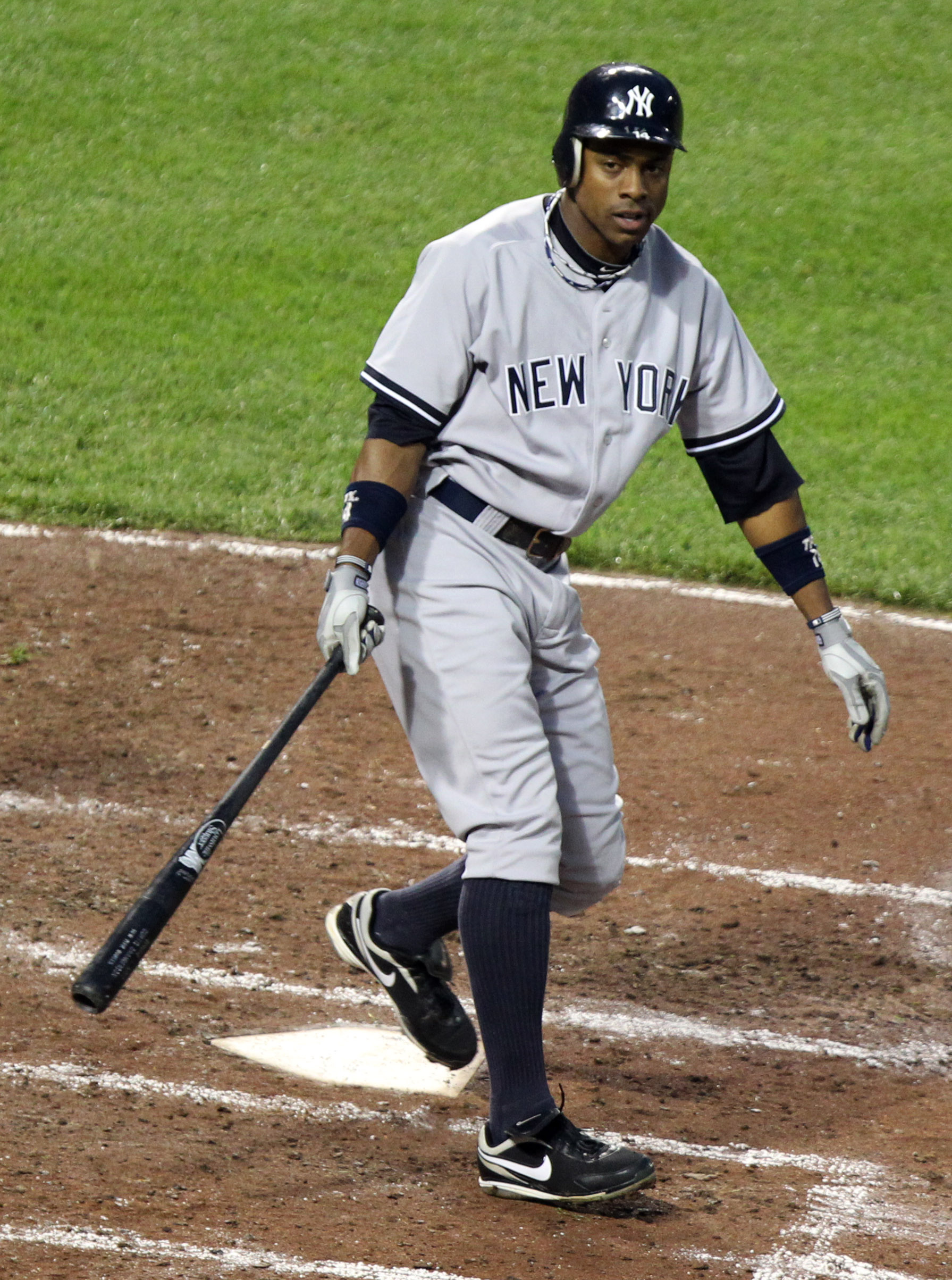
Curtis Granderson placed fourth in 2011 MVP Discussions behind Detroit Tigers pitcher Justin Verlander, Boston Red Sox outfielder Jacoby Ellsbury, and Toronto Blue Jays outfielder José Bautista.

Manager Joe Girardi's three-year contract with the Yankees ended at the conclusion of the 2010 season. Having won one World Series and bringing his team to the playoffs the past two seasons, the Yankees quickly signed him to a new 3-year deal worth $9 million. After firing pitching coach Dave Eiland, they replaced him with Cubs pitching coach Larry Rothschild.

In November, they added minor leaguers Melky Mesa, Dellin Betances, Ryan Pope, and Brandon Laird to the 40-man roster. Mesa had to be added to avoid eligibility to be a minor league free agent, while Betances, Pope, and Laird had to be added to prevent being eligible for the Rule 5 draft.

In November, long-time Yankees Derek Jeter, Andy Pettitte, and Mariano Rivera all became free agents, as well as veterans Nick Johnson, Javier Vázquez, Marcus Thames, Kerry Wood, Lance Berkman, Austin Kearns, and Chad Moeller. Dustin Moseley and Alfredo Aceves also became free agents as the Yankees opted not to tender their contracts. On November 18, 2010, the Yankees traded Juan Miranda to the Diamondbacks in exchange for minor league pitcher Scottie Allen. On November 19, 2010, they released reliever Jonathan Albaladejo per an agreement made with Albaladejo and the Yomiuri Giants of Nippon Professional Baseball.

Sergio Mitre avoided arbitration with the Yankees by signing a one-year, $900,000 deal. Derek Jeter and the Yankees agreed to a new contract of $51 million over 3 years with fourth-year option after 2013. Mariano Rivera signed a two-year, $30 million contract with the Yankees, which he hinted may be the last contract of his career.

In the Rule 5 draft, the Yankees selected pitchers Robert Fish from the Angels and Daniel Turpen from the Red Sox. The Astros meanwhile selected Yankees minor leaguer Lance Pendleton while the Padres selected George Kontos.

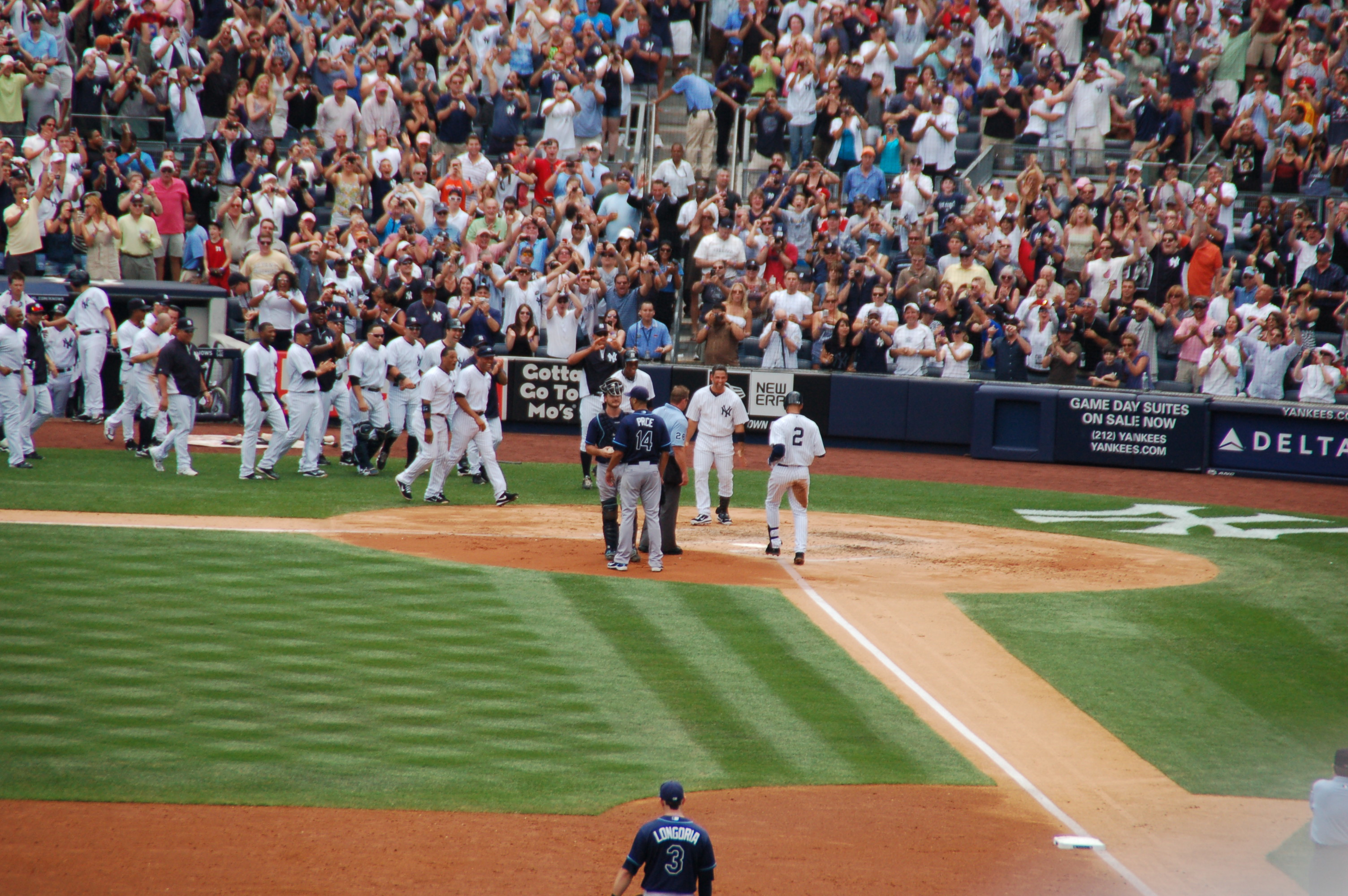
Derek Jeter joined the 3000 hit club with a solo homer off from Tampa Bay Rays' pitcher David Price at Yankee Stadium in July 2011.

On December 13, 2010, it was announced that top free agent Cliff Lee rejected the Yankees six-year, $138 million contract offer to sign a five-year, $120 million contract with the Philadelphia Phillies. Lee was the Yankees top priority in the offseason. In his place, the Yankees signed catcher Russell Martin and reliever Pedro Feliciano.

The Yankees have signed various former Major Leaguers to minor league deals, such as Brian Anderson, Luis Ayala, Ronnie Belliard, Doug Bernier, Buddy Carlyle, Eric Chavez, Bartolo Colón, Neal Cotts, Freddy García, Gustavo Molina, Mark Prior, Andy Sisco, and Luis Vizcaíno. Vizcaino's contract was later voided due to injury. They also claimed outfielder Jordan Parraz off of waivers from the Boston Red Sox.

In January 2011, the Yankees signed Rafael Soriano to a three-year contract worth $35 million and agreed with Andruw Jones on a one-year, $2 million contract, pending a physical. This deal was made official on February 14.

On February 2, the Yankees acquired Justin Maxwell from the Washington Nationals in a trade for minor league pitcher Adam Olbrychowski. To make room for him on the roster, Parraz was designated for assignment.

On February 4, Andy Pettitte announced his retirement from baseball via press conference. Pettitte played 13 seasons with the Yankees and 3 with the Astros, he was a 3x All Star selection, a 5x World Series champion, and finally a 2001 ALCS MVP.

== Roster ==
2011 New York Yankees
Roster
Pitchers: 38 Luis Ayala; 68 Dellin Betances; 66 Andrew Brackman; 34 A. J. Burnett; 41 Buddy Carlyle; 62 Joba Chamberlain; 40 Bartolo Colón; 36 Freddy García; 61 Steve Garrison; 22 Brian Gordon; 65 Phil Hughes; 70 George Kontos; 39,22 Aaron Laffey; 48 Boone Logan; 41 Jeff Marquez; 45 Sergio Mitre; 45,64 Héctor Noesí; 47 Iván Nova; 39 Lance Pendleton; 41 Scott Proctor; 42 Mariano Rivera; 30 David Robertson; 52 CC Sabathia; 39,53 Amauri Sanit; 29 Rafael Soriano; 61 Raúl Valdés; 53 Cory Wade; 45,53 Kevin Whelan	Catchers: 17 Francisco Cervelli; 55 Russell Martin; 53 Gustavo Molina; 63 Jesús Montero; 71 Austin Romine; Infielders: 24 Robinson Canó; 12 Eric Chavez; 2 Derek Jeter; 60 Brandon Laird; 26 Eduardo Núñez; 19 Ramiro Peña; 20 Jorge Posada; 13 Alex Rodriguez; 25 Mark Teixeira	Outfielders: 27 Chris Dickerson; 11 Brett Gardner; 22,67 Greg Golson; 14 Curtis Granderson; 18 Andruw Jones; 33 Nick Swisher	Manager: 28 Joe Girardi; Coaches: 57 Mike Harkey (bullpen); 50 Mick Kelleher (1st base); 54 Kevin Long (hitting); 56 Tony Peña (bench); 88 Román Rodríguez (bullpen catcher); 58 Larry Rothschild (pitching); 59 Rob Thomson (3rd base)

== Season standings ==
=== American League East ===
AL East
Team	W	L	Pct.	GB	Home	Road
New York Yankees	97	65	.599	—	52‍–‍29	45‍–‍36
Tampa Bay Rays	91	71	.562	6	47‍–‍34	44‍–‍37
Boston Red Sox	90	72	.556	7	45‍–‍36	45‍–‍36
Toronto Blue Jays	81	81	.500	16	42‍–‍39	39‍–‍42
Baltimore Orioles	69	93	.426	28	39‍–‍42	30‍–‍51

=== American League Wild Card ===
Division winners
Team	W	L	Pct.
New York Yankees	97	65	.599
Texas Rangers	96	66	.593
Detroit Tigers	95	67	.586

Wild Card team (Top team qualifies for postseason)
Team	W	L	Pct.	GB
Tampa Bay Rays	91	71	.562	—
Boston Red Sox	90	72	.556	1
Los Angeles Angels	86	76	.531	5
Toronto Blue Jays	81	81	.500	10
Cleveland Indians	80	82	.494	11
Chicago White Sox	79	83	.488	12
Oakland Athletics	74	88	.457	17
Kansas City Royals	71	91	.438	20
Baltimore Orioles	69	93	.426	22
Seattle Mariners	67	95	.414	24
Minnesota Twins	63	99	.389	28

=== Record vs. opponents ===
2011 American League record Source: MLB Standings Grid – 2011
Team	BAL	BOS	CWS	CLE	DET	KC	LAA	MIN	NYY	OAK	SEA	TB	TEX	TOR	NL
Baltimore	–	8–10	4–4	2–5	5–5	5–4	3–6	6–2	5–13	4–5	4–2	9–9	1–5	6–12	7–11
Boston	10–8	–	2–4	4–6	5–1	5–3	6–2	5–2	12–6	6–2	5–4	6–12	4–6	10–8	10–8
Chicago	4–4	4–2	–	11–7	5–13	7–11	2–6	9–9	2–6	6–4	7–2	4–4	4–4	3–4	11–7
Cleveland	5–2	6–4	7–11	–	6–12	12–6	3–6	11–7	3–4	5–2	5–4	2–4	1–9	3–4	11–7
Detroit	5–5	1–5	13–5	12–6	–	11–7	3–4	14–4	4–3	5–5	4–6	6–1	6–3	4–2	7–11
Kansas City	4–5	3–5	11–7	6–12	7–11	–	7–3	8–10	3–3	4–5	5–3	2–5	2–6	4–3	5–13
Los Angeles	6–3	2–6	6–2	6–3	4–3	3–7	–	6–3	4–5	8–11	12–7	4–4	7–12	5–5	13–5
Minnesota	2–6	2–5	9–9	7–11	4–14	10–8	3–6	–	2–6	4–4	3–5	3–7	5–3	1–5	8–10
New York	13–5	6–12	6–2	4–3	3–4	3–3	5–4	6–2	–	6–3	5–4	9–9	7–2	11–7	13–5
Oakland	5–4	2–6	4–6	2–5	5–5	5–4	11–8	4–4	3–6	–	9–10	5–2	6–13	5–5	8–10
Seattle	2–4	4–5	2–7	4–5	6–4	3–5	7–12	5–3	4–5	10–9	–	4–6	4–15	3–6	9–9
Tampa Bay	9–9	12–6	4–4	4–2	1–6	5–2	4–4	7–3	9–9	2–5	6–4	–	4–5	12–6	12–6
Texas	5–1	6–4	4–4	9–1	3–6	6–2	12–7	3–5	2–7	13–6	15–4	5–4	–	4–6	9–9
Toronto	12–6	8–10	4–3	4–3	2–4	3–4	5–5	5–1	7–11	5–5	6–3	6–12	6–4	–	8–10

- Source: MLB Standings Grid – 2011

== Regular season ==
=== March/April ===
Facing the Detroit Tigers on Opening Day, Mariano Rivera notched his 560th career save to pull within 42 saves of surpassing Trevor Hoffman for the all-time Major League record. This also marked Rivera's third career Opening Day save.

On April 3 Mark Teixeira hit his third straight home run of the season, in three consecutive days marking the first time a Yankees player had accomplished this since Dave Winfield did it in 1983. Never before—not even in their Murderers' Row days—had the Yanks hit nine homers through their first three games. Eight had been enough twice, in 1932 and '81.

Against the Minnesota Twins the Yankees hit two more home runs, coming off the bats of Alex Rodriguez and Jorge Posada, bringing the Yankees home run total in the first four games to 11, falling short of the franchise record set at 12 in 2003. With the win clinched Iván Nova became the first rookie Yankee pitcher to record a win in the first four games of the season since Al Leiter did it in 1988.

On April 5 in the second game against the Twins, Teixeira and Andruw Jones both connected for home runs, bringing the total number hit by the Yankees in the first five games to 13, tying the franchise record set by the 1932 World Champion Yankees.

Going into the game against the Toronto Blue Jays on April 19, the Yankees hit 27 home runs in the first 14 games, the most in the history of the franchise.

=== May ===
Against the Texas Rangers on May 8, Francisco Cervelli connected for the first grand slam of his career in a 12–5 Yankee win.

On May 25, Mariano Rivera made his 1,000th appearance with the Yankees, making him the 15th reliever in Major League history to accomplish the feat, and the first to do so for one team.

Facing the Seattle Mariners on May 29, Derek Jeter stole his 327th base, breaking Rickey Henderson's record for the most in Yankees history.

=== June ===
On June 24, facing the Colorado Rockies, A. J. Burnett struck out 4 batters in the 6th inning, becoming the first Yankee to accomplish this feat.

Against the Milwaukee Brewers on June 30, Mark Teixeira hit the 300th home run of his career.

=== July ===
On July 9 against the Tampa Bay Rays, Derek Jeter became the first Yankee player in history and the 28th player in MLB history to join the 3,000 hit club with a home-run off David Price in the 3rd inning. He is the only player in the 3,000 hit club to record all of his hits with the New York Yankees and only the second player to record his milestone hit with a home-run, the other player being Wade Boggs. Derek is also the second player to record five hits during his 3,000th hit game, the other player being Craig Biggio, going 5–5 in the game.

On July 30, against the Baltimore Orioles, the Yankees scored a club record 12 runs in the first inning, en route to a 17–3 victory.

=== August ===
On August 4, the Yankees completed their first four-game sweep on the road against the Chicago White Sox since 1976 in a 7–2 victory. It was only the third instance in modern baseball history in which a team swept a four-game series without giving up a walk.

Facing the Boston Red Sox, on August 5, Jeter's run scored in the sixth inning was the 1,742nd of his career, moving him past Honus Wagner for sole possession of 21st place on baseball's all-time list.

On August 25, the Yankees became the first team in history to hit three grand slam home runs in one game with a 22–9 win over the Oakland Athletics. It was done by Robinson Canó, Russell Martin, and Curtis Granderson.

=== September ===
On September 13 against the Seattle Mariners, Mariano Rivera became the second player in history to attain 600 saves. He also became the first to get all 600 with a single team.

On September 19 against the Minnesota Twins, Mariano Rivera broke Trevor Hoffman's all-time save record with his 602nd career save.

The Yankees clinched a playoff berth on September 21 against the Tampa Bay Rays and, later that day during the 2nd game of the doubleheader, clinched their 17th American League East crown.

=== October and postseason ===
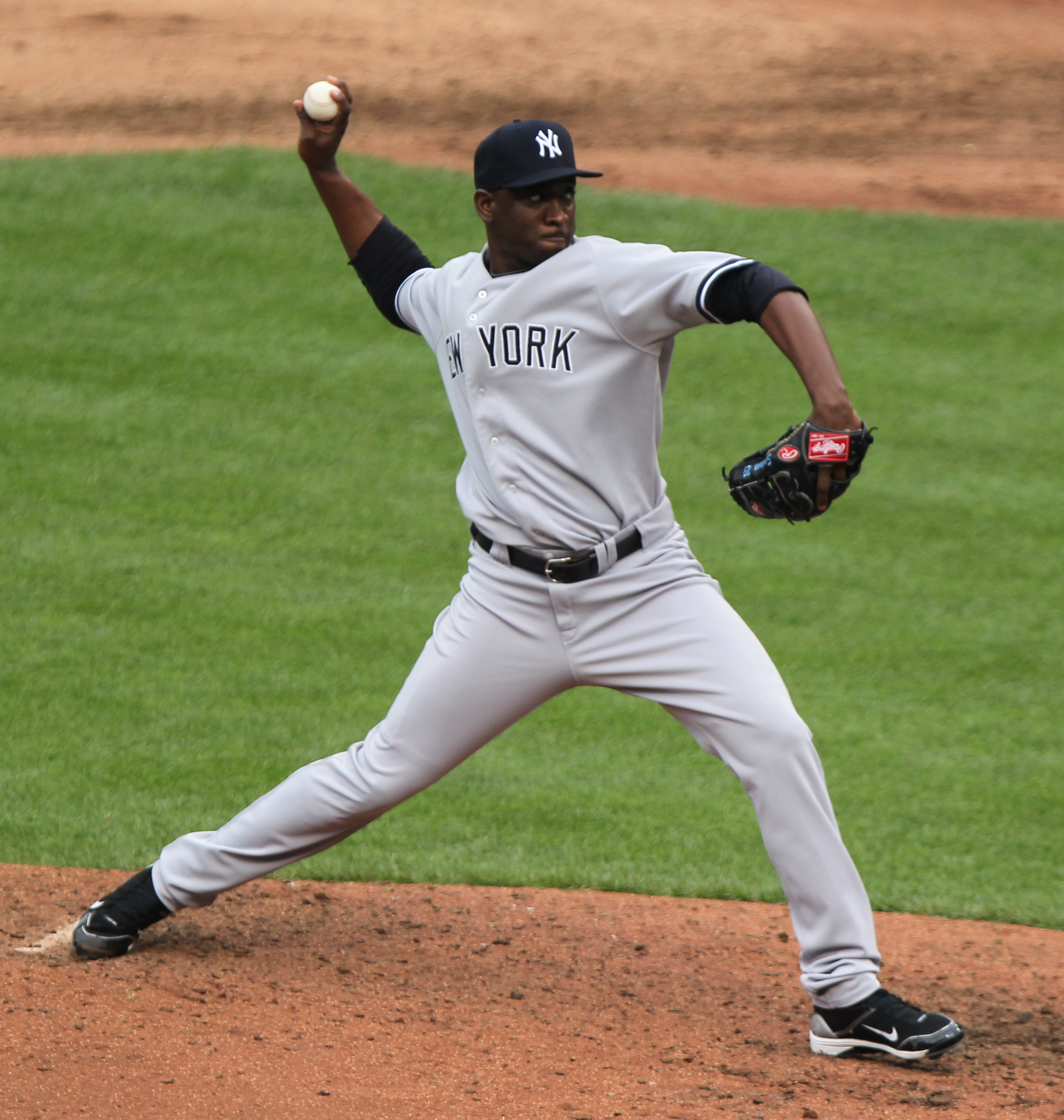
Rafael Soriano pitching in a game on September 8, 2011

The Yankees faced off with the Detroit Tigers in the ALDS. Game 1 was delayed by rain but continued a day later. Behind Robinson Canó's grand slam, the Yankees won the opener, 9–3. The Tigers won Game 2, 5–3, on the strength of a performance by Max Scherzer. When the series moved to Detroit, the Tigers took the series lead by edging the Yankees 5–4, getting a seventh-inning go-ahead Delmon Young home run. Starter A. J. Burnett, who got the starting nod because the Game 1 rainout forced the team to reshuffle its rotation, guided the Yankees to a 10–1 Game 4 win, forcing a decisive Game 5. Back home for the win-or-go-home Game 5, New York dropped a 3–2 decision to the Tigers, who jumped in front with back-to-back, first-inning solo home runs from Delmon Young and Don Kelly. In the finale, the Yankees were done in by their inability to come through with runners in scoring position, as they stranded 11 runners.

Longtime Yankees catcher Jorge Posada retired following the 2011 postseason.

=== Game log ===
Legend
Yankees Win	Yankees Loss	Game postponed

Game Log
March–April (15–9)

#	Date	Opponent	Score	Win	Loss	Save	Attendance	Record
1	March 31	Tigers	6–3	Chamberlain (1–0)	Coke (0–1)	Rivera (1)	48,226	1–0
2	April 2	Tigers	10–6	Burnett (1–0)	Penny (0–1)	Rivera (2)	41,462	2–0
3	April 3	Tigers	7–10	Scherzer (1–0)	Hughes (0–1)	Valverde (1)	40,574	2–1
4	April 4	Twins	4–3	Nova (1–0)	Baker (0–1)	Rivera (3)	40,311	3–1
5	April 5	Twins	4–5 (10)	Capps (1–0)	Logan (0–1)	Nathan (2)	40,267	3–2
	April 6	Twins	Postponed (rain); Makeup: September 19					
6	April 7	Twins	4–3	Burnett (2–0)	Liriano (0–2)	Rivera (4)	41,512	4–2
7	April 8	@ Red Sox	6–9	Lackey (1–1)	Colón (0–1)	Papelbon (1)	37,178	4–3
8	April 9	@ Red Sox	9–4	Robertson (1–0)	Buchholz (0–2)		37,488	5–3
9	April 10	@ Red Sox	0–4	Beckett (1–1)	Sabathia (0–1)		37,861	5–4
	April 12	Orioles	Postponed (rain); Makeup: July 30 as part of a Doubleheader					
10	April 13	Orioles	7–4	Burnett (3–0)	Tillman (0–1)	Rivera (5)	42,171	6–4
11	April 14	Orioles	6–5 (10)	Rivera (1–0)	Gonzalez (0–1)		40,517	7–4
12	April 15	Rangers	3–5	Harrison (3–0)	Nova (1–1)	Feliz (5)	40,814	7–5
13	April 16	Rangers	5–2	García (1–0)	Holland (2–1)	Rivera (6)	41,876	8–5
14	April 17	Rangers	6–5	Soriano (1–0)	Rhodes (0–1)	Rivera (7)	40,811	9–5
15	April 19	@ Blue Jays	5–6 (10)	Rauch (1–1)	Nova (1–2)		25,250	9–6
16	April 20	@ Blue Jays	6–2	Colón (1–1)	Cecil (1–2)	Soriano (1)	26,062	10–6
	April 22	@ Orioles	Postponed (rain); Makeup: August 27 as part of a Doubleheader					
17	April 23	@ Orioles	15–3	Sabathia (1–1)	Bergesen (0–3)		30,054	11–6
18	April 24	@ Orioles	6–3 (11)	Logan (1–1)	Berken (0–1)		25,051	12–6
19	April 25	White Sox	0–2	Humber (2–2)	Burnett (3–1)	Santos (1)	40,506	12–7
20	April 26	White Sox	2–3	Floyd (3–1)	Soriano (1–1)	Santos (2)	40,785	12–8
21	April 27	White Sox	3–1	Colón (2–1)	Buehrle (1–3)	Rivera (8)	40,856	13–8
22	April 28	White Sox	12–3	Sabathia (2–1)	Jackson (2–3)		40,081	14–8
23	April 29	Blue Jays	3–5	Romero (2–3)	García (1–1)	Rauch (5)	40,830	14–9
24	April 30	Blue Jays	5–4	Burnett (4–1)	Drabek (2–1)	Rivera (9)	42,460	15–9

May (15–14)

#	Date	Opponent	Score	Win	Loss	Save	Attendance	Record
25	May 1	Blue Jays	5–2	Nova (2–2)	Litsch (2–2)	Rivera (10)	43,363	16–9
26	May 2	@ Tigers	5–3	Chamberlain (2–0)	Valverde (2–1)	Rivera (11)	22,852	17–9
27	May 3	@ Tigers	2–4	Penny (2–3)	Sabathia (2–2)	Valverde (6)	23,551	17–10
28	May 4	@ Tigers	0–4	Scherzer (5–0)	García (1–2)		22,569	17–11
29	May 5	@ Tigers	3–6	Porcello (2–2)	Burnett (4–2)		30,572	17–12
30	May 6	@ Rangers	4–1	Nova (3–2)	Harrison (3–4)	Rivera (12)	49,069	18–12
31	May 7	@ Rangers	5–7	Rhodes (1–1)	Logan (1–2)	Feliz (6)	49,574	18–13
32	May 8	@ Rangers	12–5	Sabathia (3–2)	Rhodes (1–2)		48,057	19–13
33	May 10	Royals	3–1	García (2–2)	Davies (1–5)	Rivera (13)	41,275	20–13
34	May 11	Royals	3–4 (11)	Soria (3–0)	Carlyle (0–1)	Coleman (1)	40,164	20–14
35	May 12	Royals	5–11	O'Sullivan (2–2)	Nova (3–3)		41,790	20–15
36	May 13	Red Sox	4–5	Buchholz (4–3)	Colón (2–2)	Papelbon (6)	48,254	20–16
37	May 14	Red Sox	0–6	Beckett (3–1)	Sabathia (3–3)		48,790	20–17
38	May 15	Red Sox	5–7	Lester (5–1)	García (2–3)	Papelbon (7)	46,945	20–18
39	May 16	@ Rays	5–6	Cruz (2–0)	Burnett (4–3)	Farnsworth (8)	25,024	20–19
40	May 17	@ Rays	6–2	Nova (4–3)	Shields (4–2)		27,123	21–19
41	May 18	@ Orioles	4–1 (15)	Noesí (1–0)	Accardo (2–1)		20,589	22–19
42	May 19	@ Orioles	13–2	Sabathia (4–3)	Bergesen (1–5)		24,939	23–19
43	May 20	Mets	1–2	Dickey (2–5)	García (2–4)	Rodríguez (15)	47,874	23–20
44	May 21	Mets	7–3	Burnett (5–3)	Capuano (3–5)		48,286	24–20
45	May 22	Mets	9–3	Ayala (1–0)	Pelfrey (3–4)		48,293	25–20
46	May 23	Blue Jays	3–7	Villanueva (2–0)	Colón (2–3)		41,946	25–21
47	May 24	Blue Jays	5–4	Sabathia (5–3)	Francisco (1–2)		41,519	26–21
48	May 25	Blue Jays	7–3	García (3–4)	Reyes (0–4)		43,201	27–21
49	May 27	@ Mariners	3–4	Pauley (3–0)	Ayala (1–1)	League (13)	33,715	27–22
50	May 28	@ Mariners	4–5 (12)	Pauley (4–0)	Rivera (1–1)		37,354	27–23
51	May 29	@ Mariners	7–1	Sabathia (6–3)	Vargas (3–3)		37,290	28–23
52	May 30	@ Athletics	5–0	Colón (3–3)	Cahill (6–3)		35,067	29–23
53	May 31	@ Athletics	10–3	García (3–4)	Anderson (3–5)		22,581	30–23

June (18–8)

#	Date	Opponent	Score	Win	Loss	Save	Attendance	Record
54	June 1	@ Athletics	4–2	Burnett (6–3)	Gonzalez (5–3)	Rivera (14)	25,469	31–23
55	June 3	@ Angels	2–3	Weaver (7–4)	Nova (4–4)	Walden (13)	42,521	31–24
56	June 4	@ Angels	3–2	Sabathia (7–3)	Santana (3–5)	Rivera (15)	43,619	32–24
57	June 5	@ Angels	5–3	Colón (4–3)	Piñeiro (2–3)	Rivera (16)	43,524	33–24
58	June 7	Red Sox	4–6	Lester (8–2)	García (4–5)	Papelbon (12)	48,450	33–25
59	June 8	Red Sox	6–11	Wakefield (3–1)	Burnett (6–4)	Aceves (1)	47,863	33–26
60	June 9	Red Sox	3–8	Beckett (5–2)	Sabathia (7–4)		48,845	33–27
61	June 10	Indians	11–7	Nova (5–4)	Carmona (3–8)		45,679	34–27
62	June 11	Indians	4–0	Colón (5–3)	Talbot (2–3)		47,048	35–27
63	June 12	Indians	9–1	García (5–5)	Tomlin (7–4)		46,791	36–27
64	June 13	Indians	0–1	Carrasco (6–3)	Burnett (6–5)	Perez (16)	43,551	36–28
65	June 14	Rangers	12–4	Sabathia (8–4)	Ogando (7–1)		43,457	37–28
66	June 15	Rangers	12–4	Nova (6–4)	Holland (5–2)		45,969	38–28
67	June 16	Rangers	3–2 (12)	Wade (1–0)	Kirkman (1–1)		47,487	39–28
68	June 17	@ Cubs	1–3	Davis (1–5)	García (5–6)	Mármol (14)	42,219	39–29
69	June 18	@ Cubs	4–3	Burnett (7–5)	Dempster (5–6)	Rivera (17)	42,236	40–29
70	June 19	@ Cubs	10–4	Sabathia (9–4)	Marshall (3–2)		41,828	41–29
71	June 20	@ Reds	5–3	Nova (7–4)	Wood (5–5)	Rivera (18)	41,173	42–29
	June 21	@ Reds	Postponed (rain); Makeup: June 22 as part of a Doubleheader					
72	June 22	@ Reds	4–2	García (6–6)	Leake (6–4)	Rivera (19)	40,010	43–29
73	June 22	@ Reds	2–10	Cueto (5–2)	Gordon (0–1)		41,367	43–30
74	June 24	Rockies	2–4	Jiménez (3–7)	Burnett (7–6)	Street (23)	46,028	43–31
75	June 25	Rockies	8–3	Sabathia (10–4)	Cook (0–3)		46,900	44–31
76	June 26	Rockies	6–4	Logan (2–2)	Belisle (5–3)	Rivera (20)	47,894	45–31
77	June 28	Brewers	12–2	García (7–6)	Greinke (7–3)		45,575	46–31
78	June 29	Brewers	5–2	Burnett (8–6)	Marcum (7–3)	Rivera (21)	46,450	47–31
79	June 30	Brewers	5–0	Sabathia (11–4)	Wolf (6–5)		46,903	48–31

July (16–11)

#	Date	Opponent	Score	Win	Loss	Save	Attendance	Record
80	July 1	@ Mets	5–1	Nova (8–4)	Niese (7–7)		42,020	49–31
81	July 2	@ Mets	5–2	Colón (6–3)	Gee (8–2)		42,042	50–31
82	July 3	@ Mets	2–3 (10)	Rodríguez (2–2)	Ayala (1–2)		41,513	50–32
83	July 4	@ Indians	3–6	Tomlin (10–4)	Burnett (8–7)	Perez (20)	40,676	50–33
84	July 5	@ Indians	9–2	Sabathia (12–4)	Carrasco (8–5)		30,100	51–33
85	July 6	@ Indians	3–5	Masterson (7–6)	Hughes (0–2)	Perez (21)	31,926	51–34
86	July 7	Rays	1–5	Niemann (4–4)	Colón (6–4)		47,787	51–35
	July 8	Rays	Postponed (rain); Makeup: September 22					
87	July 9	Rays	5–4	Robertson (2–0)	Peralta (2–4)	Rivera (22)	48,103	52–35
88	July 10	Rays	1–0	Sabathia (13–4)	Shields (8–7)		47,350	53–35
All-Star Break NL defeats AL 5–1.
89	July 14	@ Blue Jays	7–16	Reyes (5–7)	Colón (6–5)		37,342	53–36
90	July 15	@ Blue Jays	1–7	Morrow (6–4)	García (7–7)		33,525	53–37
91	July 16	@ Blue Jays	4–1	Sabathia (14–4)	Romero (7–9)	Rivera (23)	45,606	54–37
92	July 17	@ Blue Jays	7–2	Hughes (1–2)	Villanueva (5–2)		36,586	55–37
93	July 18	@ Rays	5–4	Robertson (3–0)	Torres (0–1)	Rivera (24)	22,471	56–37
94	July 19	@ Rays	2–3	Hellickson (9–7)	Colón (6–6)	Peralta (1)	22,780	56–38
95	July 20	@ Rays	4–0	García (8–7)	Price (9–8)		21,505	57–38
96	July 21	@ Rays	1–2	Shields (9–8)	Sabathia (14–5)	Farnsworth (19)	29,279	57–39
97	July 22	Athletics	17–7	Noesí (2–0)	Cahill (8–9)		46,921	58–39
98	July 23	Athletics	3–4	Harden (2–1)	Burnett (8–8)	Bailey (11)	46,188	58–40
99	July 24	Athletics	7–5	Colón (7–6)	Gonzalez (9–7)	Rivera (25)	45,586	59–40
100	July 25	Mariners	10–3	García (9–7)	Vargas (6–9)		44,365	60–40
101	July 26	Mariners	4–1	Sabathia (15–5)	Fister (3–12)	Rivera (26)	46,132	61–40
102	July 27	Mariners	2–9	Hernández (9–9)	Hughes (1–3)		47,090	61–41
103	July 29	Orioles	2–4	Guthrie (5–14)	Burnett (8–9)	Gregg (17)	46,499	61–42
104	July 30	Orioles	8–3	Colón (8–6)	Tillman (2–4)		46,469	62–42
105	July 30	Orioles	17–3	Nova (9–4)	Britton (6–8)		43,190	63–42
106	July 31	Orioles	4–2	García (10–7)	Arrieta (10–8)	Rivera (27)	46,913	64–42

August (17–11)

#	Date	Opponent	Score	Win	Loss	Save	Attendance	Record
107	August 1	@ White Sox	3–2	Sabathia (16–5)	Peavy (4–5)	Rivera (28)	24,142	65–42
108	August 2	@ White Sox	6–0 (7)	Hughes (2–3)	Danks (4–9)		21,661	66–42
109	August 3	@ White Sox	18–7	Wade (2–0)	Floyd (9–10)		23,873	67–42
110	August 4	@ White Sox	7–2	Nova (10–4)	Humber (8–8)		28,088	68–42
111	August 5	@ Red Sox	3–2	Logan (3–2)	Lester (11–5)	Rivera (29)	38,006	69–42
112	August 6	@ Red Sox	4–10	Lackey (10–8)	Sabathia (16–6)		37,416	69–43
113	August 7	@ Red Sox	2–3 (10)	Bard (2–5)	Hughes (2–4)		38,189	69–44
114	August 9	Angels	4–6	Downs (6–2)	Rivera (1–2)	Walden (26)	46,466	69–45
115	August 10	Angels	9–3	Nova (11–4)	Richards (0–1)		46,967	70–45
116	August 11	Angels	6–5	Soriano (2–1)	Rodney (2–4)	Rivera (30)	47,431	71–45
117	August 12	Rays	1–5	Price (10–10)	Sabathia (16–7)		47,894	71–46
118	August 13	Rays	9–2	Hughes (3–4)	Hellickson (10–8)		47,804	72–46
	August 14	Rays	Postponed (rain); Makeup: September 21					
119	August 15	@ Royals	7–4	Burnett (9–9)	Paulino (1–9)	Rivera (31)	24,879	73–46
120	August 16	@ Royals	9–7	Nova (12–4)	Duffy (3–7)	Rivera (32)	22,258	74–46
121	August 17	@ Royals	4–5	Chen (8–5)	Colón (8–7)	Soria (22)	22,435	74–47
122	August 18	@ Twins	8–4	Sabathia (17–7)	Duensing (8–12)		41,126	75–47
123	August 19	@ Twins	8–1	Hughes (4–4)	Slowey (0–1)		41,328	76–47
124	August 20	@ Twins	4–9	Liriano (9–9)	Burnett (9–10)			76–48
125	August 21	@ Twins	3–0	Nova (13–4)	Dumatrait (1–2)	Rivera (33)	41,242	77–48
126	August 23	Athletics	5–6	McCarthy (7–6)	Colón (8–8)	Bailey (17)	47,343	77–49
127	August 24	Athletics	4–6 (10)	De Los Santos (2–0)	Soriano (2–2)	Bailey (18)	47,271	77–50
128	August 25	Athletics	22–9	Logan (4–2)	De Los Santos (2–1)		46,369	78–50
129	August 26	@ Orioles	5–12	Hunter (3–2)	Burnett (9–11)		32,762	78–51
	August 27	@ Orioles	Postponed (Hurricane Irene); Makeup: September 8					
130	August 28	@ Orioles	0–2	Britton (8–9)	Colón (8–9)	Gregg (19)	28,751	78–52
131	August 28	@ Orioles	8–3	Nova (14–4)	Matusz (1–7)		37,528	79–52
132	August 29	@ Orioles	3–2	García (11–7)	Simón (4–7)	Rivera (34)	18,223	80–52
133	August 30	@ Red Sox	5–2	Sabathia (18–7)	Lackey (12–10)	Rivera (35)	37,773	81–52
134	August 31	@ Red Sox	5–9	Beckett (12–5)	Hughes (4–5)		38,021	81–53

September (16–12)

#	Date	Opponent	Score	Win	Loss	Save	Attendance	Record
135	September 1	@ Red Sox	4–2	Wade (3–0)	Aceves (9–2)	Rivera (36)	38,074	82–53
136	September 2	Blue Jays	3–2	Nova (15–4)	Morrow (9–10)	Rivera (37)	47,240	83–53
137	September 3	Blue Jays	6–4	Logan (5–2)	Romero (13–10)	Robertson (1)	47,744	84–53
138	September 4	Blue Jays	9–3	Sabathia (19–7)	Cecil (4–8)		47,464	85–53
139	September 5	Orioles	11–10	Laffey (2–1)	Johnson (5–5)	Rivera (38)	45,069	86–53
140	September 6	Orioles	5–3	Wade (4–0)	Hunter (3–3)	Rivera (39)	44,573	87–53
141	September 7	Orioles	4–5 (11)	Strop (1–1)	Noesí (2–1)	Johnson (3)	40,104	87–54
142	September 8	@ Orioles	4–5 (10)	Rapada (1–0)	Proctor (2–4)		33,841	87–55
143	September 9	@ Angels	1–2	Walden (5–3)	Laffey (2–2)		41,014	87–56
144	September 10	@ Angels	0–6	Haren (15–8)	Sabathia (19–8)		43,774	87–57
145	September 11	@ Angels	6–5	Wade (5–0)	Santana (11–11)	Rivera (40)	42,581	88–57
146	September 12	@ Mariners	9–3	Hughes (5–5)	Hernández (14–12)		22,029	89–57
147	September 13	@ Mariners	3–2	Burnett (10–11)	Furbush (3–8)	Rivera (41)	18,306	90–57
148	September 14	@ Mariners	1–2 (12)	Delabar (1–0)	Wade (5–1)		20,327	90–58
149	September 16	@ Blue Jays	4–5	Janssen (5–0)	Logan (5–3)		29,323	90–59
150	September 17	@ Blue Jays	7–6	Laffey (3–2)	Villanueva (6–4)	Rivera (42)	39,288	91–59
151	September 18	@ Blue Jays	0–3	Morrow (10–11)	García (11–8)	Francisco (16)	34,657	91–60
152	September 19	Twins	6–4	Wade (6–1)	Diamond (1–5)	Rivera (43)	40,045	92–60
153	September 20	Rays	5–0	Nova (16–4)	Davis (10–10)		46,944	93–60
154	September 21	Rays	4–2	Ayala (2–2)	Shields (15–12)	Rivera (44)	42,755	94–60
155	September 21	Rays	4–2	Robertson (4–0)	McGee (3–2)	Soriano (2)	45,586	95–60
156	September 22	Rays	8–15	Moore (1–0)	Colón (8–10)		47,470	95–61
	September 23	Red Sox	Postponed (rain); Makeup: September 25 as part of a doubleheader					
157	September 24	Red Sox	9–1	García (12–8)	Lester (15–9)		49,556	96–61
158	September 25	Red Sox	6–2	Burnett (11–11)	Wakefield (7–8)		49,541	97–61
159	September 25	Red Sox	4–7 (14)	Morales (1–2)	Proctor (2–5)		49,072	97–62
160	September 26	@ Rays	2–5	Shields (16–12)	Noesí (2–2)	Farnsworth (24)	18,772	97–63
161	September 27	@ Rays	3–5	McGee (4–2)	Soriano (2–3)	Farnsworth (25)	22,820	97–64
162	September 28	@ Rays	7–8 (12)	McGee (5–2)	Proctor (2–6)		29,518	97–65

== Player stats ==
=== Batting ===
Note: G = Games played; AB = At bats; R = Runs; H = Hits; 2B = Doubles; 3B = Triples; HR = Home runs; RBI = Runs batted in; SB = Stolen bases; BB = Walks; AVG = Batting average; SLG = Slugging average

Player	G	AB	R	H	2B	3B	HR	RBI	SB	BB	AVG	SLG
Robinson Canó	159	623	104	188	46	7	28	118	8	38	.302	.533
Mark Teixeira	156	589	90	146	26	1	39	111	4	76	.248	.494
Curtis Granderson	156	583	136	153	26	10	41	119	25	85	.262	.552
Derek Jeter	131	546	84	162	24	4	6	61	16	46	.297	.388
Nick Swisher	150	526	81	137	30	0	23	85	2	95	.260	.449
Brett Gardner	159	510	87	132	19	8	7	36	49	60	.259	.369
Russell Martin	125	417	57	99	17	0	18	65	8	50	.237	.408
Alex Rodriguez	99	373	67	103	21	0	16	62	4	47	.276	.461
Jorge Posada	115	344	34	81	14	0	14	44	0	39	.235	.398
Eduardo Núñez	112	309	38	82	18	2	5	30	22	22	.265	.385
Andruw Jones	77	190	27	47	8	0	13	33	0	29	.247	.495
Eric Chavez	58	160	16	42	7	1	2	26	0	14	.263	.356
Francisco Cervelli	43	124	17	33	4	0	4	22	4	9	.266	.395
Jesus Montero	18	61	9	20	4	0	4	12	0	7	.328	.590
Chris Dickerson	60	50	9	13	2	0	1	7	4	2	.260	.360
Ramiro Peña	23	40	5	4	0	0	1	4	0	2	.100	.175
Brandon Laird	11	21	3	4	0	0	0	1	0	3	.190	.190
Austin Romine	9	19	2	3	0	0	0	0	0	1	.158	.158
Greg Golson	9	11	1	2	0	0	0	0	1	1	.182	.182
Gustavo Molina	3	6	0	1	1	0	0	0	0	0	.167	.333
Pitcher totals	162	16	0	0	0	0	0	0	0	1	.000	.000
Team totals	162	5518	867	1452	267	33	222	836	147	627	.263	.444

=== Pitching ===
Note: W = Wins; L = Losses; ERA = Earned run average; G = Games pitched; GS = Games started; SV = Saves; IP = Innings pitched; H = Hits allowed; R = Runs allowed; ER = Earned runs allowed; BB = Walks allowed; SO = Strikeouts

Player	W	L	ERA	G	GS	SV	IP	H	R	ER	BB	SO
CC Sabathia	19	8	3.00	33	33	0	237.1	230	87	79	61	280
A.J. Burnett	11	11	5.15	33	32	0	190.1	190	115	109	83	173
Iván Nova	16	4	3.70	28	27	0	165.1	163	74	68	57	98
Bartolo Colón	8	10	4.00	29	26	0	164.1	172	85	73	40	135
Freddy García	12	8	3.62	26	25	0	146.2	152	63	59	45	96
Phil Hughes	5	5	5.79	17	14	0	74.2	84	48	48	27	47
David Robertson	4	0	1.08	70	0	1	66.2	40	9	8	35	100
Mariano Rivera	1	2	1.91	64	0	44	61.1	47	13	13	8	60
Héctor Noesí	2	2	4.47	30	2	0	56.1	63	29	28	22	45
Luis Ayala	2	2	2.09	52	0	0	56.0	51	17	13	20	39
Boone Logan	5	3	3.46	64	0	0	41.2	43	20	16	13	46
Cory Wade	6	1	2.04	40	0	0	39.2	33	10	9	8	30
Rafael Soriano	2	3	4.12	42	0	2	39.1	33	18	18	18	36
Joba Chamberlain	2	0	2.83	27	0	0	28.2	23	10	9	7	24
Lance Pendleton	0	0	3.21	11	0	0	14.0	10	5	5	10	8
Scott Proctor	0	3	9.00	8	0	0	11.0	19	13	11	12	11
Aaron Laffey	2	1	3.38	11	0	0	10.2	13	4	4	5	6
Brian Gordon	0	1	5.23	2	2	0	10.1	12	6	6	3	4
Buddy Carlyle	0	1	4.70	8	0	0	7.2	5	4	4	7	9
Amauri Sanit	0	0	12.86	4	0	0	7.0	12	10	10	3	4
Raúl Valdés	0	0	2.70	6	0	0	6.2	8	2	2	2	8
George Kontos	0	0	3.00	7	0	0	6.0	4	2	2	3	6
Sergio Mitre	0	0	11.81	4	0	0	5.1	9	9	7	4	2
Jeff Marquez	0	0	2.25	3	0	0	4.0	5	1	1	0	2
Dellin Betances	0	0	6.75	2	1	0	2.2	1	2	2	6	2
Andrew Brackman	0	0	0.00	3	0	0	2.1	1	0	0	3	0
Kevin Whelan	0	0	5.40	2	0	0	1.2	0	1	1	5	1
Steve Garrison	0	0	0.00	1	0	0	0.2	0	0	0	0	0
Team totals	97	65	3.73	162	162	47	1458.1	1423	657	605	507	1222

=== Postseason game log ===
Legend
Yankees Win	Yankees Loss	Game Postponed

2011 Postseason Game Log
ALDS vs Tigers (Yankees lose series 2–3)

#	Date	Opponent	Score	Win	Loss	Save	Attendance	Record
1	September 30	Tigers	Suspended by (rain) – postponed to October 1					
1	October 1	Tigers	9–3	Nova (1–0)	Fister (0–1)		50,940	1–0
2	October 2	Tigers	3–5	Scherzer (1–0)	García (0–1)		50,596	1–1
3	October 3	@ Tigers	4–5	Verlander (1–0)	Soriano (0–1)	Valverde (1)	43,581	1–2
4	October 4	@ Tigers	10–1	Burnett (1–0)	Porcello (0–1)		43,527	2–2
5	October 6	Tigers	2–3	Fister (1–1)	Nova (1–1)	Valverde (2)	50,960	2–3

=== Notable transactions ===
2011 Transactions
Before Regular Season

Transactions
- October 19, 2010: Signed free agent 3B Adam Silva.
- October 25, 2010: Signed free agent OF Wilmer Romero.
- November 1, 2010: RHP Chad Gaudin elected free agency. Outrighted Royce Ring to Scranton/Wilkes-Barre Yankees. Called up CF Melky Mesa from Tampa Yankees.
- November 7, 2010: 1B Lance Berkman elected free agency. SS Derek Jeter elected free agency. LF Austin Kearns elected free agency. C Chad Moeller elected free agency. LHP Andy Pettitte elected free agency. RHP Mariano Rivera elected free agency. LF Marcus Thames elected free agency. RHP Javier Vázquez elected free agency. RHP Kerry Wood elected free agency. DH Nick Johnson elected free agency.
- November 19, 2010: Released RHP Jonathan Albaladejo.
- November 20, 2010: Signed free agent OF Breland Brown. Signed free agent 3B Jhoan Gomez. Signed free agent RHP Juan Matos. Signed free agent 1B Yheraldy Medo. Signed free agent SS Freddy Noguera. Signed free agent OF Jose Polanco. Signed free agent RHP Leonel Vinas. Signed free agent RHP Eduardo Rivera. Signed free agent OF Miguel Mojica. Signed free agent C Julio Pina.
- December 2, 2010: RHP Alfredo Aceves elected free agency. RHP Dustin Moseley elected free agency.
- December 7, 2010: Signed free agent SS Derek Jeter.
- December 9, 2010: Claim LHP Robert Fish off waivers from Arkansas Travelers. Claim RHP Daniel Turpen off waivers from Portland Sea Dogs.
- December 7, 2010: Signed free agent RHP Mariano Rivera.
- December 15, 2010: Signed free agent SS Doug Bernier. Signed free agent RHP Buddy Carlyle. Signed free agent C Gustavo Molina. Signed free agent RHP Mark Prior.
- December 16, 2010: Signed free agent C Russell Martin.
- December 17, 2010: Claim Jordan Parraz off waivers from Boston Red Sox.
- January 3, 2011: Signed free agent LHP Pedro Feliciano.
- January 5, 2011: Claim Brian Schlitter off waivers from Chicago Cubs.
- January 18, 2011: Signed free agent RHP Rafael Soriano.
- January 6, 2011: Signed free agent OF José Figueroa. Signed free agent RHP Luis Niebla.
- February 2, 2011: Designated Jordan Parraz for assignment.
- February 11, 2011: Signed free agent RHP Luis Ayala.
- February 14, 2011: Signed free agent RF Andruw Jones. Designated RHP Brian Schlitter for assignment.
- February 15, 2011: Philadelphia Phillies claim RHP Brian Schlitter off waivers from New York Yankees.
- February 16, 2011: released LHP Neal Cotts.
- February 23, 2011: signed free agent 1B Nick Ebert.
- February 3, 2011: signed free agent RHP Eliseo Batista.
- March 13, 2011: Kansas City Royals claim Robert Fish off waivers. Returned Rule 5 draft pick Daniel Turpen to the Pawtucket Red Sox
- March 23, 2011: claimed LHP Jose Ortegano off waivers from Atlanta Braves
- March 25, 2011: signed free agent RHP Kevin Millwood to minor league contract
- March 27, 2011: Rule 5 draftee Lance Pendleton returned from Houston Astros
- March 28, 2011: Eric Chavez added to roster from Scranton/Wilkes-Barre Yankees. Released 2BRonnie Belliard.
- March 30, 2011: Luis Ayala, Bartolo Colón, Freddy García, and Gustavo Molina added to roster from Scranton/Wilkes-Barre Yankees. Placed Francisco Cervelli and Pedro Feliciano on the 15-Day disabled list. Placed Reegie Corona, Colin Curtis, and Dámaso Marte on the 60-Day disabled list
- March 31, 2011: Released RHP Rómulo Sánchez.

April

Transactions
- April 9, 2011: signed free agent RHP Carlos Silva to a minor league contract
- April 13, 2011: placed RHP Luis Ayala on the 15-Day disabled list
- April 15, 2011: placed RHP Phil Hughes on the 15-Day disabled list. Called up RHP Lance Pendletonfrom Scranton/Wilkes-Barre Yankees.
- April 22, 2011: Called up RHP Buddy Carlyle from Scranton/Wilkes-Barre Yankees. Released LHP Jose Ortegano. Optioned Héctor Noesí to Scranton/Wilkes-Barre Yankees.
- April 28, 2011:Signed free agent LHP Brad Halsey.
- April 29, 2011: Activated C Francisco Cervelli from the 15-Day disabled list. Optioned DH Gustavo Molina to Scranton/Wilkes-Barre Yankees.

== Farm system ==
Level	Team	League	Manager
AAA	Scranton/Wilkes-Barre Yankees	International League	Dave Miley
AA	Trenton Thunder	Eastern League	Tony Franklin
A	Tampa Yankees	Florida State League	Luis Sojo
A	Charleston RiverDogs	South Atlantic League	Aaron Ledesma
A-Short Season	Staten Island Yankees	New York–Penn League	Tom Slater
Rookie	GCL Yankees	Gulf Coast League	Carlos Mendoza

LEAGUE CHAMPIONS: Staten Island, GCL Yankees
