= 2011 American League Division Series =

Major League Baseball postseason

Teams
Team (Wins)		Manager	Season
Detroit Tigers (3)		Jim Leyland	95–67 (.586), GA: 15
New York Yankees (2)		Joe Girardi	97–65 (.599), GA: 6
- Dates: September 30 – October 6
- Television: TBS (Games 1, 3–5); TNT (Game 2)
- TV announcers: Brian Anderson, Ron Darling, and John Smoltz
- Radio: ESPN
- Radio announcers: Dan Shulman and Orel Hershiser
- Umpires: Gerry Davis (crew chief), Tony Randazzo, Eric Cooper, Dan Iassogna, Ted Barrett and Bill Welke

Teams
Team (Wins)		Manager	Season
Texas Rangers (3)		Ron Washington	96–66 (.593), GA: 10
Tampa Bay Rays (1)		Joe Maddon	91–71 (.562), GB: 6
- Dates: September 30 – October 4
- Television: TBS (Games 1, 3–4); TNT (Game 2)
- TV announcers: Don Orsillo and Buck Martinez
- Radio: ESPN
- Radio announcers: Gary Cohen and Aaron Boone
- Umpires: Dale Scott (crew chief), Mark Carlson, Kerwin Danley, Greg Gibson, Brian Gorman, Marvin Hudson

The 2011 American League Division Series (abbreviated ALDS) were two best-of-five playoffs comprising the opening round of Major League Baseball’s (MLB) 2011 postseason, played to determine the participating teams in the 2011 American League Championship Series. Three divisional winners and a fourth team—a wild card—played in two series. TBS televised all games but the Game 2's of both series in the United States. The Game 2's of both series were aired on TNT due to schedule conflicts with other ALDS games or the NLDS. The regular season finished on September 28, with the ALDS beginning September 30. Game 5 of the Yankees–Tigers series was played on October 6.

Under MLB's playoff format, no two teams from the same division were matched up in the Division Series, regardless of whether their records would normally indicate such a matchup. Home field advantage went to the team with the better regular-season record with the exception of the wild card team, which defers home field advantage regardless of record. The matchups were:

- (1) New York Yankees (AL East champions) vs. (3) Detroit Tigers (AL Central champions): Tigers won the series, 3–2.
- (2) Texas Rangers (AL West champions) vs. (4) Tampa Bay Rays (Wild Card qualifier): Rangers won the series, 3–1.

This was the second consecutive playoff meeting between the Rangers and Rays; the Rangers won 3–2 in the 2010 ALDS. The Tigers and Yankees previously met in the 2006 ALDS, in which the Tigers won 3–1, the last time they reached the postseason.

The Rangers would go on to defeat the Tigers in the ALCS, then lose the 2011 World Series to the National League champion St. Louis Cardinals.

== Participants ==
- On September 16, the Detroit Tigers clinched the AL Central title, becoming the first team of the season to qualify for the ALDS. It was the Tigers' first AL Central title since they joined the division in 1998, the team's first division title overall since 1987, and first playoff appearance since winning the 2006 American League pennant as the Wild Card team.
- On September 21, the New York Yankees clinched the AL East title, their Major League record 17th overall.
- On September 23, after the Angels lost to the Athletics, the Texas Rangers clinched the AL West for the second straight year.
- On September 28, after making up a 9-game deficit in the final month of the season and going into the season's last day tied with the Red Sox for the last playoff berth, the Tampa Bay Rays clinched the AL Wild Card by defeating the Yankees in extra innings while the Red Sox lost to the Orioles.

== Matchups ==
=== New York Yankees vs. Detroit Tigers ===
Detroit won the series, 3–2.

Game	Date	Score	Location	Time	Attendance
1	September 30† / October 1	Detroit Tigers – 3, New York Yankees – 9	Yankee Stadium	3:26 (1:17 delay)	50,940
2	October 2	Detroit Tigers – 5, New York Yankees – 3	Yankee Stadium	3:34	50,596
3	October 3	New York Yankees – 4, Detroit Tigers – 5	Comerica Park	3:14	43,581
4	October 4	New York Yankees – 10, Detroit Tigers – 1	Comerica Park	3:10	43,527
5	October 6	Detroit Tigers – 3, New York Yankees – 2	Yankee Stadium	3:34	50,960

† Game suspended in the bottom of the second inning due to rain; official MLB records and statistics all carry the original game date.

=== Texas Rangers vs. Tampa Bay Rays ===
Texas won the series, 3–1.

Game	Date	Score	Location	Time	Attendance
1	September 30	Tampa Bay Rays – 9, Texas Rangers – 0	Rangers Ballpark in Arlington	3:00	50,498
2	October 1	Tampa Bay Rays – 6, Texas Rangers – 8	Rangers Ballpark in Arlington	3:28	51,351
3	October 3	Texas Rangers – 4, Tampa Bay Rays – 3	Tropicana Field	3:51	32,828
4	October 4	Texas Rangers – 4, Tampa Bay Rays – 3	Tropicana Field	3:05	28,299

== New York vs. Detroit ==
=== Game 1 ===
September 30, 2011 (started) and October 1, 2011 (completed) 8:37 pm (EDT) at Yankee Stadium in Bronx, New York 70 °F (21 °C), overcast w/ incoming rain/56 °F (13 °C), mostly cloudy
Team	1	2	3	4	5	6	7	8	9	R	H	E
Detroit	1	0	0	0	0	0	0	0	2	3	7	0
New York	1	0	0	0	1	6	0	1	X	9	11	0
WP: Iván Nova (1–0) LP: Doug Fister (0–1); Home runs: DET: Delmon Young (1); NYY: Robinson Canó (1); Attendance: 50,940; Boxscore

In front of a Yankee Stadium record setting crowd of 50,940, Justin Verlander, 24-game winner, Triple Crown winner, and Cy Young Award frontrunner, started Game 1 for the Tigers against Yankees' ace CC Sabathia. The Tigers started the scoring on Delmon Young's two-out solo home run in the top of the first inning. The Yankees managed to tie the game in the bottom half without a hit. Leadoff batter Derek Jeter reached first base on a wild pitch third strike. Jeter moved to third on Curtis Granderson's walk and Robinson Canó's groundout and then scored on Alex Rodriguez's RBI groundout. The game was delayed by rain in the middle of the second inning and later suspended (Note: The contest was suspended under MLB Rule 4.10 Comment, which states that postseason games which have started and are then called may not be declared "no game" with any activity discarded, as in Rule 4.10(e). Instead, all called postseason games are considered suspended and are to be resumed from the point of interruption at a future date, as in Rule 4.12. This policy was adopted by MLB following the suspension of Game 5 of the 2008 World Series. The rule was later extended in 2020 where regular season games which have started and then called before the trailing team has batted five innings also comply with the same rule.) and resumed at 8:37 p.m. on October 1, pushing Game 2 back to October 2.

The suspension significantly altered both teams' pitching rotations for the series. Doug Fister and Iván Nova, both of whom were originally scheduled to start Game 2, entered as relief pitchers when Game 1 was resumed. Jorge Posada led off the continuation of the game with a single and then Russell Martin doubled, but Posada was tagged out trying to go home on a Brett Gardner grounder. The Tigers threatened in the fifth inning, putting men on first and second. However, Granderson made a strong throw to Jeter, who relayed to Martin at home to tag out Alex Avila trying to score the go-ahead run. Granderson hit a double in the bottom of the inning and Canó drove him in with an RBI double that was reviewed by instant replay after the ball hit the top of the wall near the boundary line. In the next inning, the Yankees scored six runs and, after Fister was relieved, a Canó grand slam, extending the Yankees lead to 8–1. Later, Canó knocked in his sixth RBI on an eighth-inning double to score Jeter, tying a Yankees postseason record for RBIs in a game by a single player.

The Tigers threatened in the top of ninth when Delmon Young's single, Miguel Cabrera's walk, and Víctor Martínez' single loaded the bases. Nova was relieved by Luis Ayala, who surrendered an RBI groundout by Avila, an RBI single by Ryan Raburn, and a single by Jhonny Peralta to load the bases again. The Yankees turned to their closer, all-time saves leader Mariano Rivera, in a non-save situation, who struck out Wilson Betemit to end the game.

=== Game 2 ===
October 2, 2011 3:07 pm (EDT) at Yankee Stadium in Bronx, New York 61 °F (16 °C), partly cloudy w/ incoming rain
Team	1	2	3	4	5	6	7	8	9	R	H	E
Detroit	2	0	0	0	0	2	0	0	1	5	9	0
New York	0	0	0	0	0	0	0	1	2	3	5	1
WP: Max Scherzer (1–0) LP: Freddy García (0–1); Home runs: DET: Miguel Cabrera (1); NYY: Curtis Granderson (1), Nick Swisher (1); Attendance: 50,596; Boxscore

Max Scherzer threw 5 1/3 no-hit innings before allowing a single to Robinson Canó. Scherzer got help from the Tigers' offense early, as Magglio Ordóñez singled with one out in the first inning, then Miguel Cabrera hit an opposite-field home run one out later to put the Tigers in front 2–0. In the sixth, Austin Jackson reached on Derek Jeter's throwing error to first, then Ordóñez singled. After Delmon Young struck out, back-to-back RBI singles from both Cabrera and Víctor Martínez made it 4-0 Tigers and knocked Freddy García out of the game. The Yankees got on the board in the eighth on Curtis Granderson's leadoff home run off of Joaquín Benoit, but in the ninth, Luis Ayala hit Brandon Inge with a pitch. Inge moved to second on a groundout and scored on Don Kelly's single to give the Tigers the run back. In the bottom of the inning, Nick Swisher hit a leadoff home run off José Valverde, who then allowed a triple to Jorge Posada and walked Russell Martin before Andruw Jones's sacrifice fly cut the Tigers' lead to 5–3. Jeter struck out and Granderson walked before Valverde retired Robinson Canó on a groundout, sending the teams to Detroit with the series tied at a game apiece.

=== Game 3 ===
October 3, 2011 8:37 pm (EDT) at Comerica Park in Detroit, Michigan 55 °F (13 °C), overcast
Team	1	2	3	4	5	6	7	8	9	R	H	E
New York	2	0	0	0	0	0	2	0	0	4	6	0
Detroit	0	0	2	0	1	1	1	0	X	5	8	0
WP: Justin Verlander (1–0) LP: Rafael Soriano (0–1) Sv: José Valverde (1); Home runs: NYY: None; DET: Delmon Young (2); Attendance: 43,581; Boxscore

In a rematch of the Game 1 starters, the Yankees struck first off of Justin Verlander when Derek Jeter singled to lead off the first and scored on Curtis Granderson's triple. After Robinson Cano struck out, Granderson scored on Alex Rodriguez's single to make it 2–0 Yankees. In the bottom of the third, Ramon Santiago's RBI single with two on off of C.C. Sabathia scored Brandon Inge from second. A single loaded the bases before Miguel Cabrera grounded into a double play, but Austin Jackson scored to tie the game. Inge hit a leadoff single, moved to second on a sacrifice bunt, and scored again on an RBI double by Santiago in the fifth inning, giving the Tigers the lead. Don Kelly hit a leadoff single and scored on an RBI double by Jhonny Peralta in the sixth to increase Detroit's lead. After Alex Avila's sacrifice bunt, Sabathia was relieved by Rafael Soriano. In the seventh, after getting two outs, Verlander walked Jorge Posada and hit Russell Martin with a pitch before both men scored on a Brett Gardner RBI double, tying the game. In the bottom of the inning, Delmon Young's home run off of Soriano put the Tigers back in front 5–4. José Valverde recorded his 50th consecutive save in as many tries—including regular season—for the Tigers win, striking out Jeter with runners on first and second, both having reached on walks, to end the game.

=== Game 4 ===
October 4, 2011 8:37 pm (EDT) at Comerica Park in Detroit, Michigan 61 °F (16 °C), clear
Team	1	2	3	4	5	6	7	8	9	R	H	E
New York	0	0	2	0	2	0	0	6	0	10	13	0
Detroit	0	0	0	1	0	0	0	0	0	1	4	0
WP: A. J. Burnett (1–0) LP: Rick Porcello (0–1); Home runs: NYY: None; DET: Víctor Martínez (1); Attendance: 43,527; Boxscore

With their backs against the wall, the Yankees relied on A. J. Burnett to even the series. Burnett, who was assigned to the bullpen in the Division Series due to inconsistency, re-took the starting role thanks to the suspension in Game 1. Burnett was almost to be relieved by Cory Wade in the bottom of the first inning after issuing a two-out walk to Víctor Martínez that loaded the bases, but Curtis Granderson's run-saving catch helped Burnett escape the jam unharmed. Derek Jeter's two-run double in the third put the Yankees on board, but Martínez's solo homer in the bottom of the fourth cut the Yankees' lead to one. Granderson's RBI double and Alex Rodriguez's sacrifice fly in the fifth increased the lead to three. Burnett was relieved after Don Kelly's two-out single in the bottom of the sixth, and he gave the Yankees what they were hoping for—tossing 5 2/3 innings, allowing four hits, one earned run, and four walks while striking out three. Later, Granderson's second run-saving catch of the day ended the sixth inning for Burnett and the Yankees.

The Yankees' offense erupted in the top of the eighth. Three struggling Yankees hitters—Rodriguez, Mark Teixeira, and Nick Swisher—hit consecutive singles to start the eighth inning. A balk by the Tigers' reliever Al Alburquerque and an RBI single by pinch-hitter Jesús Montero brought in two more runs for the Yankees. Russell Martin was walked to load the bases again, followed by Brett Gardner's RBI single for another run. The next two batters—Derek Jeter and Granderson—both struck out, but Montero scored on a wild pitch by Tigers' reliever Daniel Schlereth during Granderson's at-bat. Robinson Canó singled in two more runs to increase the lead to 10–1. The six-run rally was more than enough for the Yankees, as the Yankees' relievers—Rafael Soriano, Phil Hughes, and Boone Logan—held the Tigers hitless in the remaining 3 1/3 innings while striking out six.

=== Game 5 ===
October 6, 2011 8:07 pm (EDT) at Yankee Stadium in Bronx, New York 62 °F (17 °C), clear
Team	1	2	3	4	5	6	7	8	9	R	H	E
Detroit	2	0	0	0	1	0	0	0	0	3	8	0
New York	0	0	0	0	1	0	1	0	0	2	10	0
WP: Doug Fister (1–1) LP: Iván Nova (1–1) Sv: José Valverde (2); Home runs: DET: Don Kelly (1), Delmon Young (3); NYY: Robinson Canó (2); Attendance: 50,960; Boxscore

Game 5 was a rematch of the two pitchers of record in Game 1—Iván Nova and Doug Fister. Despite the fans setting another Yankee Stadium record with 50,960 in attendance, the Tigers eliminated the Yankees with a 3–2 win. Back–to–back homers by Don Kelly and Delmon Young in the first inning put Detroit on top. Young's homer was his third, a Tigers record in a playoff series. Nova did not last long, as he was pulled after the second inning with forearm tightness. The Tigers made it 3–0 in the top of the fifth when Víctor Martínez singled off CC Sabathia to drive in Austin Jackson. In the bottom of the fifth the Yankees finally scored on a Robinson Canó solo homer, and got another run in the seventh when Mark Teixeira walked with the bases loaded to score Derek Jeter. However, Joaquín Benoit managed to strike out Nick Swisher with the bases still loaded, ending the threat. José Valverde closed the door when he struck out Alex Rodriguez in the ninth, earning his 51st straight save of the combined 2011 season and postseason.

The Tigers became only the third team to beat the Yankees in consecutive post-season series meetings; previously the 1921–22 New York Giants and the 2002 and 2005 Angels were able to beat the Yankees in consecutive playoff series meetings. This was also the first time since 2007 the Yankees were eliminated at home.

CC Sabathia appeared in relief for the first time in his career when he relieved Boone Logan in the fifth, in which he surrendered the winning run. Mariano Rivera made what would be his final postseason appearance, pitching a scoreless ninth.

=== Composite box ===
2011 ALDS (3–2): Detroit Tigers over New York Yankees

Team	1	2	3	4	5	6	7	8	9	R	H	E
Detroit Tigers	5	0	2	1	2	3	1	0	3	17	36	0
New York Yankees	3	0	2	0	4	6	3	8	2	28	45	1
Total attendance: 239,604 Average attendance: 47,920

== Texas vs. Tampa Bay ==
=== Game 1 ===
September 30, 2011 4:07 pm (CDT) at Rangers Ballpark in Arlington, Texas 82 °F (28 °C), sunny
Team	1	2	3	4	5	6	7	8	9	R	H	E
Tampa Bay	0	3	3	0	2	0	0	0	1	9	11	0
Texas	0	0	0	0	0	0	0	0	0	0	2	1
WP: Matt Moore (1–0) LP: C. J. Wilson (0–1); Home runs: TB: Johnny Damon (1), Kelly Shoppach 2 (2); TEX: None; Attendance: 50,498; Boxscore

The Rays were coming off of their incredible momentum from their late September rally to steal the Wild Card spot from the Red Sox, while the Rangers were looking to win their second straight AL pennant. Rookie Matt Moore started Game 1 for the Rays, his second Major League start and fourth appearance since his September 12 promotion from Triple-A. Moore gave the Rays seven shutout innings—allowing two hits and two walks while striking out six. After pitching a perfect first, C. J. Wilson hit Ben Zobrist with a pitch leading off the second, then Johnny Damon's home run put Tampa up 2−0. Kelly Shoppach then singled, moved to second on a ground out, and scored on Matt Joyce's single. Shoppach's three-run home run after two singles next inning made it 6−0 Tampa. In the fifth, Adrián Beltré's throwing error to first allowed Damon to reach base, then Shoppach's second home run of the game made it 8−0 Tampa. They added one more run in the ninth on Damon's single with runners on second and third off of Mike Gonzalez. Wade Davis retired the Rangers in order in the bottom half to preserve the shutout.

=== Game 2 ===
October 1, 2011 6:07 pm (CDT) at Rangers Ballpark in Arlington, Texas 81 °F (27 °C), clear
Team	1	2	3	4	5	6	7	8	9	R	H	E
Tampa Bay	1	0	0	2	0	0	3	0	0	6	9	0
Texas	0	0	0	5	0	2	0	1	X	8	10	1
WP: Derek Holland (1–0) LP: James Shields (0–1) Sv: Neftalí Feliz (1); Home runs: TB: Matt Joyce (1), Evan Longoria (1); TEX: Mitch Moreland (1); Attendance: 51,351; Boxscore

The Rays struck first on Kelly Shoppach's bases-loaded walk in the first inning and Matt Joyce's two-run home run in the fourth. However, Rays starter James Shields ran into trouble in the bottom of the fourth. After Elvis Andrus' hit-by-pitch and consecutive singles by Josh Hamilton and Michael Young loaded the bases, Shields again hit Adrián Beltré and surrendered a two-run single to Mike Napoli. The next two batters, Nelson Cruz and David Murphy, both struck out, but Murphy reached first base on an uncaught third strike thanks to a wild pitch earlier to advance the runners. Beltré also scored on that play. Mitch Moreland followed up with an RBI groundout to score Napoli. The five-run fourth gave the Rangers a 5–3 lead over the Rays.

Rangers starter Derek Holland put another zero on the scoreboard before handing the game to the bullpen. The Rangers continued to score on Ian Kinsler's two-run double in the sixth. Evan Longoria came up with a three-run homer in the seventh to bring the Rays within a run. Moreland answered with a solo homer in the eighth to increase the lead to two. Neftalí Feliz pitched a scoreless ninth to record the save. Until 2023, this was the only ALDS game the Rangers had won at home, and with the Rangers moving to Globe Life Field in 2020, the only ALDS game the Rangers won at Globe Life Park.

=== Game 3 ===
October 3, 2011 5:07 pm (EDT) at Tropicana Field in St. Petersburg, Florida 73 °F (23 °C), dome
Team	1	2	3	4	5	6	7	8	9	R	H	E
Texas	0	0	0	0	0	0	4	0	0	4	9	0
Tampa Bay	0	0	0	1	0	0	1	1	0	3	6	0
WP: Colby Lewis (1–0) LP: David Price (0–1) Sv: Neftalí Feliz (2); Home runs: TEX: Mike Napoli (1); TB: Desmond Jennings 2 (2); Attendance: 32,828; Boxscore

A Desmond Jennings home run in the fourth gave the Rays an early lead. David Price, winless against the Rangers in his Major League career, held Texas without a run for six innings before giving up a Mike Napoli two-run homer after Adrián Beltré singled. Josh Hamilton later hit a two-RBI single off reliever J. P. Howell to put Texas ahead 4–1. Later, in the bottom half, Sean Rodriguez hit an RBI groundout to score Johnny Damon and cut Texas's lead to two. In the bottom of the eighth, Jennings cut the deficit to one on his second solo home run of the game; however, the Rays' comeback attempt was put to rest on a double play grounder by Kelly Shoppach in the ninth.

=== Game 4 ===
October 4, 2011 2:07 pm (EDT) at Tropicana Field in St. Petersburg, Florida 73 °F (23 °C), dome
Team	1	2	3	4	5	6	7	8	9	R	H	E
Texas	1	1	0	1	0	0	1	0	0	4	6	0
Tampa Bay	0	1	0	1	0	0	0	0	1	3	7	0
WP: Matt Harrison (1–0) LP: Jeremy Hellickson (0–1) Sv: Neftalí Feliz (3); Home runs: TEX: Ian Kinsler (1), Adrián Beltré 3 (3); TB: None; Attendance: 28,299; Boxscore

The Rangers struck first with an Ian Kinsler home run off Rays' starter Jeremy Hellickson in the first inning. Three homers by Adrián Beltré off Hellickson in the second and fourth, and off Matt Moore in the seventh gave Texas the much-needed cushion. The Rays tried to come back when Matt Joyce doubled in the second and scored Sean Rodriguez in a plate collision with Mike Napoli. Later Rodriguez also scored in the fourth and ninth off Casey Kotchman RBI singles, but the game ended after Joyce popped out in foul territory to Beltré and Desmond Jennings grounded into a force out. Beltré became the sixth player in MLB history to hit three home runs in a single postseason game, joining Babe Ruth (1926 and 1928 World Series), Bob Robertson (1971 NLCS), Reggie Jackson (1977 World Series), George Brett (1978 ALCS), and Adam Kennedy (2002 ALCS).

With the win, the Rangers advanced to their second straight ALCS. This also improved the Rangers' postseason record at Tropicana Field to 5–0.

=== Composite box ===
2011 ALDS (3–1): Texas Rangers over Tampa Bay Rays

Team	1	2	3	4	5	6	7	8	9	R	H	E
Texas Rangers	1	1	0	6	0	2	5	1	0	16	27	2
Tampa Bay Rays	1	4	3	4	2	0	4	1	2	21	33	0
Total attendance: 162,976 Average attendance: 40,744

== See also ==
- 2011 National League Division Series
