= Dellin Betances =

American baseball player (born 1988)

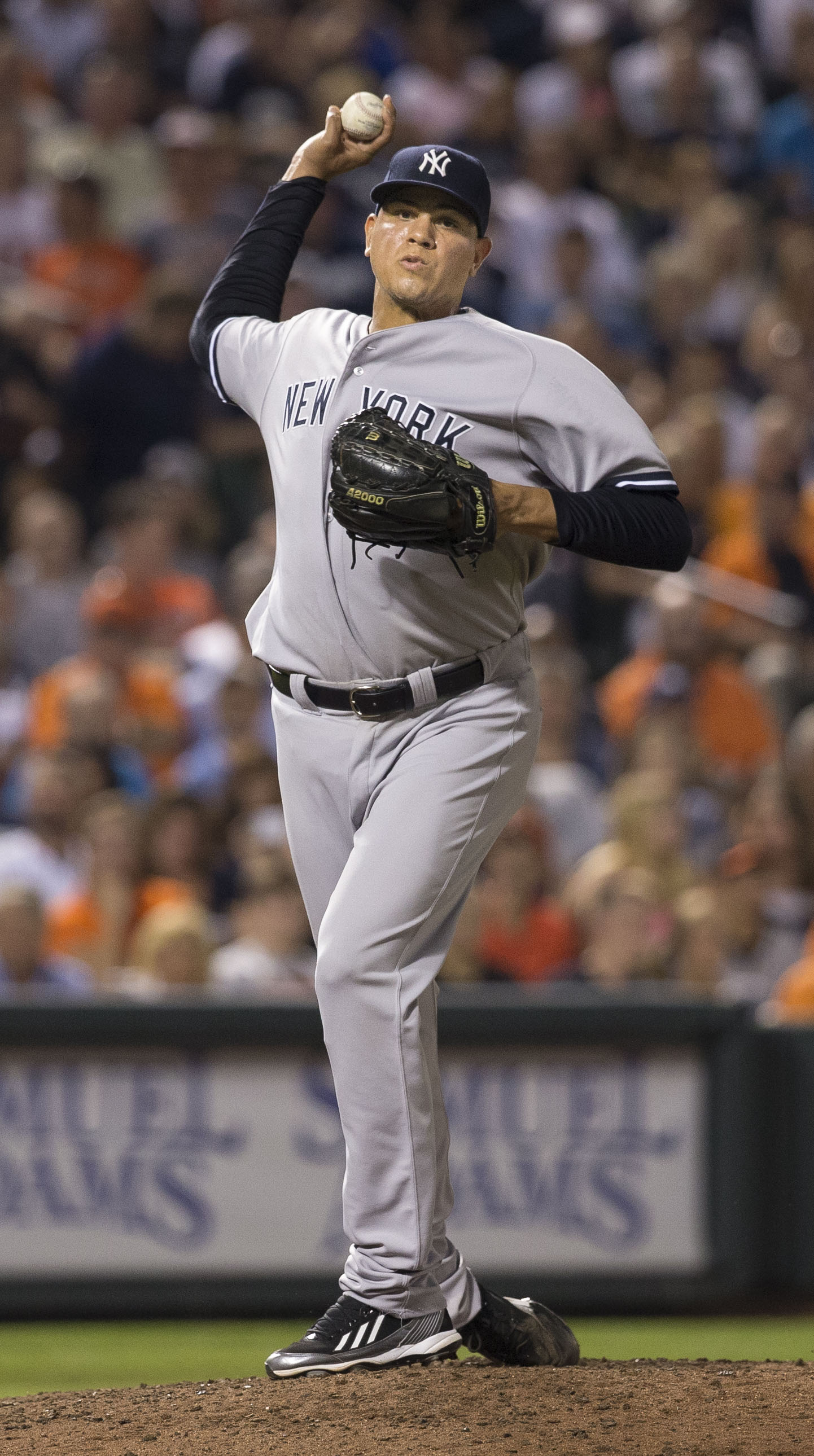
- Betances with the New York Yankees in 2014
- Pitcher
- Born: March 23, 1988 (age 38); New York City, New York, U.S.
- Batted: Right Threw: Right

MLB debut
- September 22, 2011, for the New York Yankees

Last MLB appearance
- April 7, 2021, for the New York Mets

MLB statistics
- Win–loss record: 21–23
- Earned run average: 2.53
- Strikeouts: 633
- Stats at Baseball Reference

Teams
- New York Yankees (2011, 2013–2019); New York Mets (2020–2021)

Career highlights and awards
- 4× All-Star (2014–2017)

Dellin Betances (/ˈdɛlɪn bəˈtænsɪs/; born March 23, 1988) is an American former professional baseball pitcher. He played in Major League Baseball (MLB) for the New York Yankees and New York Mets from 2011 to 2021. Betances was named an MLB All-Star from 2014 to 2017.

== Early life ==
Betances was born in Washington Heights, Manhattan. His parents, Jaime and Maria, immigrated to the United States from the Dominican Republic. Jaime is a boxer and drives for a car service. Betances has two older brothers and a younger sister. Spanish was Betances' first language. The family moved to the Lower East Side when he was ten years old.

Betances attended many New York Yankees games with his family as a child. At the age of 10, Betances attended the perfect game of then-Yankees pitcher David Wells in 1998, sitting with the Bleacher Creatures. He credits his family taking him to Yankee games with his choosing baseball over basketball. He played baseball in the summer in the Youth Service League.

Betances attended Progress High School within the Grand Street Campus in Brooklyn, New York. As a freshman, Betances was 6 feet 4 inches (1.93 m) tall, and could throw a fastball as fast as 85 miles per hour (137 km/h). He played in a summer developmental league with future teammate Adam Ottavino, who was a couple of grades older, and Ottavino described him as very tall and lanky, saying he matured into his well-built 6 ft 8 in (2.03 m) structure as he got older.

By his junior year in 2005, Betances could throw upwards of 90 miles per hour (140 km/h). In 2005, Betances was named an Aflac All-American, the first player from New York City to receive the honor. He also played for the Team USA Junior National Team. By his senior year in 2006, Betances was 6 feet 9 inches (2.06 m) tall. SchoolSports.com rated Betances as the tenth best high school prospect in 2006.

== Professional career ==
=== New York Yankees ===
Betances was expected to be chosen in the first round of the 2006 MLB draft. However, he committed to attend Vanderbilt University on a baseball scholarship to play for the Vanderbilt Commodores and had a high signing bonus demand, which led him to fall in the draft. The Yankees selected Betances in the eighth round of the draft and gave him a $1 million signing bonus to forgo his commitment to Vanderbilt.

Betances was rated the Yankees' third best prospect for 2007, and their fifth best for 2009, according to Baseball America. He spent 2007 with the Staten Island Yankees of the Class A-Short Season New York–Penn League and 2008 with the Charleston RiverDogs of the Class A South Atlantic League. In 2009, he pitched for the Tampa Yankees of the Class A-Advanced Florida State League. He struggled with Tampa, as he pitched to a 2–5 win–loss record with a 5.48 earned run average (ERA) in 11 games started, before suffering an elbow injury in June. Betances had surgery late in the 2009 season, which was erroneously reported as Tommy John surgery, but was instead a ligament reinforcement procedure.

Betances began the 2010 season with Tampa, and received a midseason promotion to the Trenton Thunder of the Class AA Eastern League. Following the 2010 season, Betances was added to the Yankees' 40 man roster. He began the 2011 season with Trenton, and was promoted to the Scranton/Wilkes-Barre Yankees of the Class AAA International League on August 13.

==== 2011-2013 ====
On September 8, 2011, Betances was promoted to the majors for the first time. Betances had a pitching session in the street in front of his Teaneck, New Jersey home with his brother before joining up with the Yankees in Anaheim. Betances and fellow prospect Andrew Brackman made their MLB debuts on September 22, 2011. Betances made only two appearances for the Yankees.

Betances spent the 2012 season with Scranton/Wilkes-Barre. On May 10, 2013, amid continued struggles with command, the Yankees announced that they would shift Betances to the bullpen. He was optioned back to Triple-A on May 24, 2013, after Iván Nova was activated from the disabled list. After pitching to a 1.46 ERA with 63 strikeouts in 49 1/3 innings as a relief pitcher with Scranton/Wilkes-Barre, the Yankees recalled Betances on August 11.

Betances was optioned to Triple-A Scranton/Wilkes-Barre on August 15 and brought back up to the majors on September 1, 2013, when rosters were expanded.

==== 2014 ====
Betances made the Yankees' Opening Day roster in 2014. He was elected to his first All Star Game in 2014, becoming the first Yankees rookie pitcher—along with teammate Masahiro Tanaka—to earn an All-Star Game nod since Spec Shea in 1947.

On September 17, 2014, Betances struck out Kevin Kiermaier in the eighth inning of a game against the Tampa Bay Rays to notch his 131st strikeout, surpassing Mariano Rivera's Yankees team record for strikeouts by a relief pitcher, set in 1996. Betances did so pitching 20 innings fewer than Rivera.

Despite the physical height listed above for him in high school, Betances was listed on the Yankees' 2014 roster as being 6-foot-8, which is why he chose his uniform number of 68. In 2014, Betances made 70 appearances out of the bullpen with a 5–0 record, a 1.40 ERA, and his 135 strikeouts led the majors amongst all relief pitchers. Betances finished in 3rd place in voting for the American League Rookie of the Year Award, behind Angels pitcher Matt Shoemaker and White Sox first baseman Jose Abreu.

==== 2015 ====
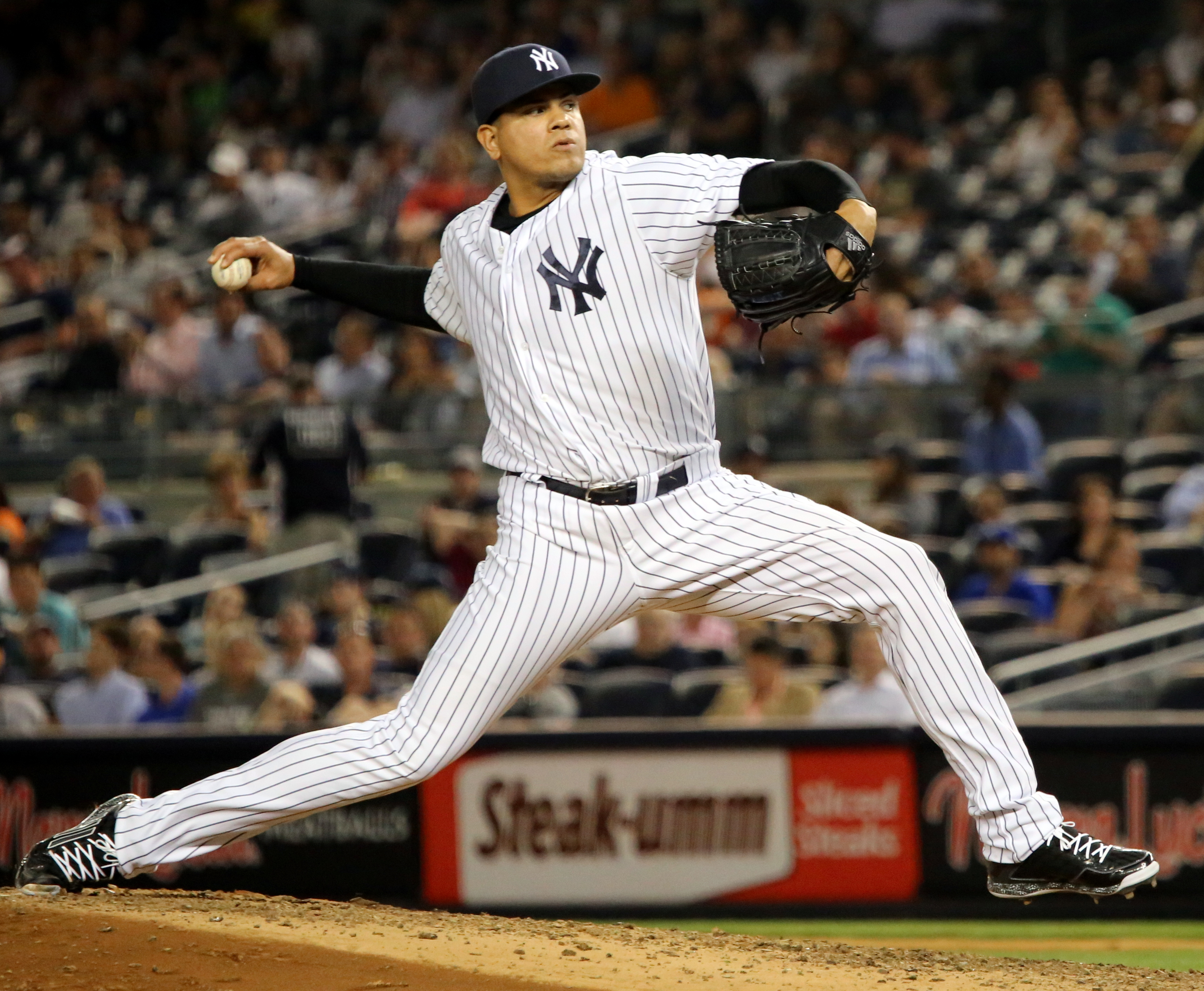
Betances in 2015

Before the 2015 season, New York Yankees manager Joe Girardi announced that Betances and Andrew Miller would split the closing job to begin the season. Although he gave up no earned runs in April, his first save opportunity came only on May 2, when he struck out all four batters he faced, to earn his first save of the season. He was elected to his second All-Star game. On August 19, he struck out his 100th batter of the season, making it two seasons in a row in which he achieved that feat. He became the first Yankees reliever in franchise history to reach the 100-strikeout club in back-to-back seasons, needing only 64 innings to do it this year. He finished 15th in the 2015 AL Cy Young voting.

==== 2016 ====
Before the 2016 season began, the Yankees acquired closer Aroldis Chapman. The triumvirate of Betances, Chapman, and Miller became known by fans as "No Runs–D.M.C.”, owing to the relievers' dominance of opposing hitters. Betances was named to his third straight MLB All-Star Game. He became the Yankees closer after the Yankees traded Chapman to the Chicago Cubs, and Miller to the Cleveland Indians, in late July. For the third straight season, Betances struck out 100 batters. Overall in 2016, Betances made 73 appearances with 126 strikeouts, a 3−6 record, a 3.08 ERA, and 12 saves.

==== 2017 ====
On May 14, 2017, Betances became the Yankees' closer in place of an injured Chapman, who had returned to the Yankees at the beginning of the season. On August 2, 2017, Betances pitched an immaculate inning against the Detroit Tigers, striking out the side in the eighth on the minimum nine pitches. It was the sixth immaculate inning recorded in Yankees history according to Baseball Almanac, and the first by a Yankee pitcher since Brandon McCarthy accomplished the feat on September 17, 2014. On August 24, Betances was ejected for the first time in his Major League career after hitting James McCann with a pitch. This followed after Miguel Cabrera and Austin Romine were ejected for triggering a bench-clearing brawl.

==== 2018 ====
With Betances' struggles with command in 2017 there was speculation that the Yankees would move him. However, Betances’ command returned to his career norms and he set a career high in strikeout rate. He was not selected for the All-Star Game, breaking a streak of four straight appearances. On September 1, 2018, Betances reached a milestone that no other reliever in MLB has accomplished: he struck out his 100th batter of the season, making him the only reliever in MLB to strike out 100 batters for five consecutive seasons.

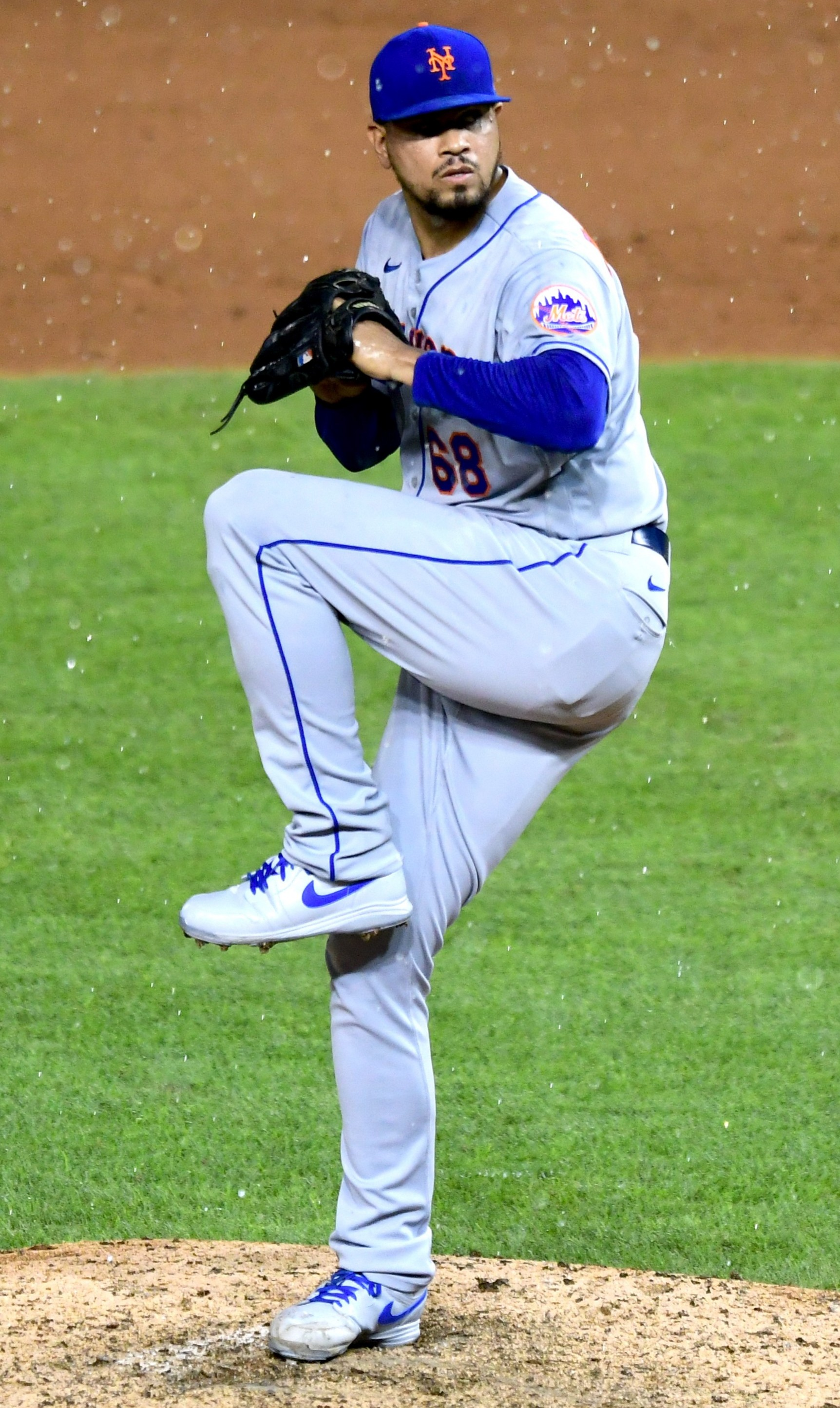
Betances in 2020

==== 2019 ====
On March 19, 2019, it was announced by the team that Betances would start the season on the injured list due to a right shoulder impingement. He was transferred to the 60-day injured list, and was revealed that he was diagnosed with a bone spur behind his right shoulder, putting his chances of playing in 2019 in jeopardy. He made his 2019 season debut on September 15 against the Toronto Blue Jays, where he pitched 2/3 innings, but tore his achilles tendon during the appearance, ending his season.

=== New York Mets ===
On December 24, 2019, Betances signed a one-year deal with the New York Mets. In 2020 for the Mets, Betances struggled across 15 games, registering a 7.71 ERA with 11 strikeouts in 11.2 innings of work.

On April 8, 2021, Betances was placed on the 10-day injured list with a right shoulder impingement, the second of his career. On April 24, Betances was transferred to the 60-day injured list. On June 30, it was announced that Betances would undergo season-ending surgery on his bothersome shoulder, ending his 2021 season at one inning of work.

=== Los Angeles Dodgers ===
On April 4, 2022, Betances signed a minor league deal with the Los Angeles Dodgers. He allowed 17 runs in 13 innings over 15 games for the Oklahoma City Dodgers before he was released on August 17, 2022. Shortly after his release, Betances retired.

== Pitching style ==
In 2013, Betances was tracked by the PITCHf/x system as having thrown a four-seam fastball averaging 96 miles per hour (154 km/h), a slurve averaging 82 miles per hour (132 km/h), and a changeup averaging 89 miles per hour (143 km/h). He is known for his high strikeout rate.

== Broadcasting career ==
In 2025, Betances joined the YES Network as a studio analyst. He appears on the network’s Yankees Hot Stove and Batting Practice Today shows in addition to its pregame and postgame coverage.

== Personal life ==
With the money Betances received in his signing bonus, he purchased a house for his parents in Teaneck, New Jersey. Betances has been married to Janisa Betances since 2018. They had a son in February 2019, and two daughters, in September 2020 and March 2022.
