= Lance Pendleton =

American baseball player (born 1983)

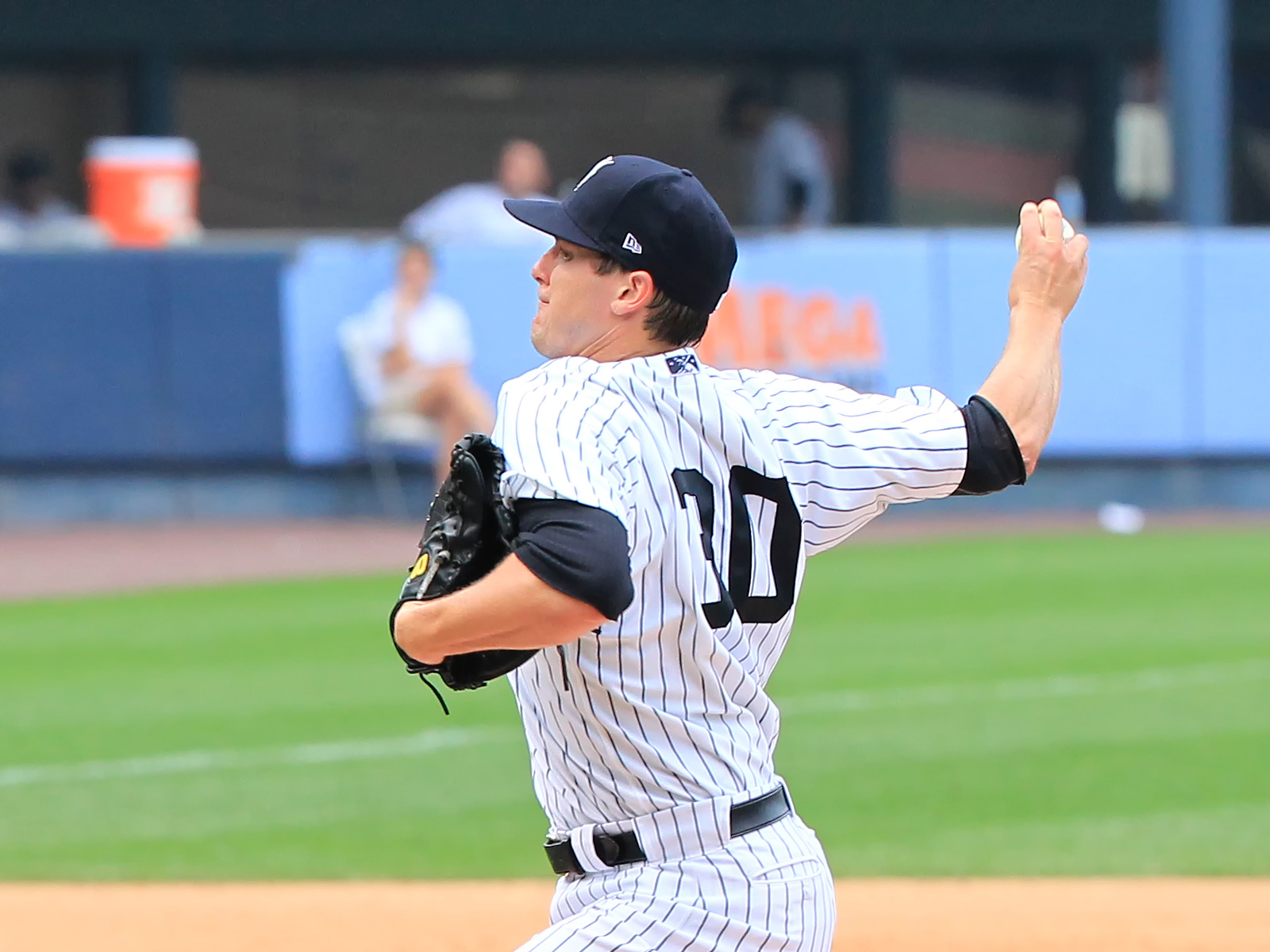
- Pendleton pitching for the Scranton/Wilkes-Barre Yankees
- Pitcher
- Born: September 10, 1983 (age 43); Houston, Texas, U.S.
- Batted: Left Threw: Right

MLB debut
- April 15, 2011, for the New York Yankees

Last MLB appearance
- September 28, 2011, for the Houston Astros

MLB statistics
- Win–loss record: 0–0
- Earned run average: 6.75
- Strikeouts: 13
- Stats at Baseball Reference

Teams
- New York Yankees (2011); Houston Astros (2011)

Lance Michael Pendleton (born September 10, 1983) is an American former professional baseball pitcher. He played in Major League Baseball (MLB) with the New York Yankees and Houston Astros.

== Early life ==
Pendleton grew up a Houston Astros fan. He attended Kingwood High School from 1999 to 2002, where he played for the Kingwood Mustangs. Pendleton earned All-District MVP as an accomplished pitcher and hitter. He was drafted out of high school by the San Diego Padres in the 13th round of the 2002 MLB draft, but did not sign.

== College career ==
Pendleton attended Rice University, where he played for the Rice Owls baseball team. In 2003, Pendleton was a member of the College World Series champions, the first victory for Rice in its fourth tournament appearance. In 2003, he played collegiate summer baseball with the Wareham Gatemen of the Cape Cod Baseball League. He rounded out his college career in 2005 with a 5-3 record and a 3.7 ERA.

== Professional career ==
New York Yankees

Pendleton was selected in the fourth round (139th overall) of the 2005 Major League Baseball draft by the New York Yankees. Shortly afterwards, Lance underwent Tommy John surgery. Returning to the Yankees farm club in 2007, Lance played for 6 teams in 5 years, compiling a 32–22 record and a 3.39 cumulative ERA. He was named a Mid-Season All-Star while with the Charleston RiverDogs in 2008. Playing for the Tampa Yankees in 2009, he was named Pitcher of the Week for the week of June 29 and was a Post-Season All-Star. In 2010, Pendleton was Pitcher of the Week for the week of July 26 and a Mid-Season All-Star while a member of the Trenton Thunder.

In the 2010 Rule 5 Draft, Pendleton was taken by the Houston Astros. He was returned to the Yankees on March 27, 2011. He was promoted to the majors on April 15, when Phil Hughes was placed on the disabled list. After he spent most of the season between Triple-A and the big leagues, Pendleton was designated for assignment by the Yankees.

Houston Astros

He was claimed off waivers by the Astros in September 2011. Allowing nine runs in 4 2/3 innings with the Astros, they outrighted him to the minor leagues following the season. As this was the second time he was outrighted, he had the option to opt for free agency, which he exercised.

The Astros signed Pendleton to a minor league contract with an invitation to spring training for the 2012 season. On March 30, 2012, Pendleton was released by the Houston Astros.

Tampa Bay Rays

After starting spring training with the Sugar Land Skeeters of the Atlantic League, Pendleton signed a minor league deal with the Tampa Bay Rays in April. He spent the entire 2012 season pitching for the AAA Durham Bulls.
