= Gustavo Molina =

Venezuelan baseball player (born 1982)

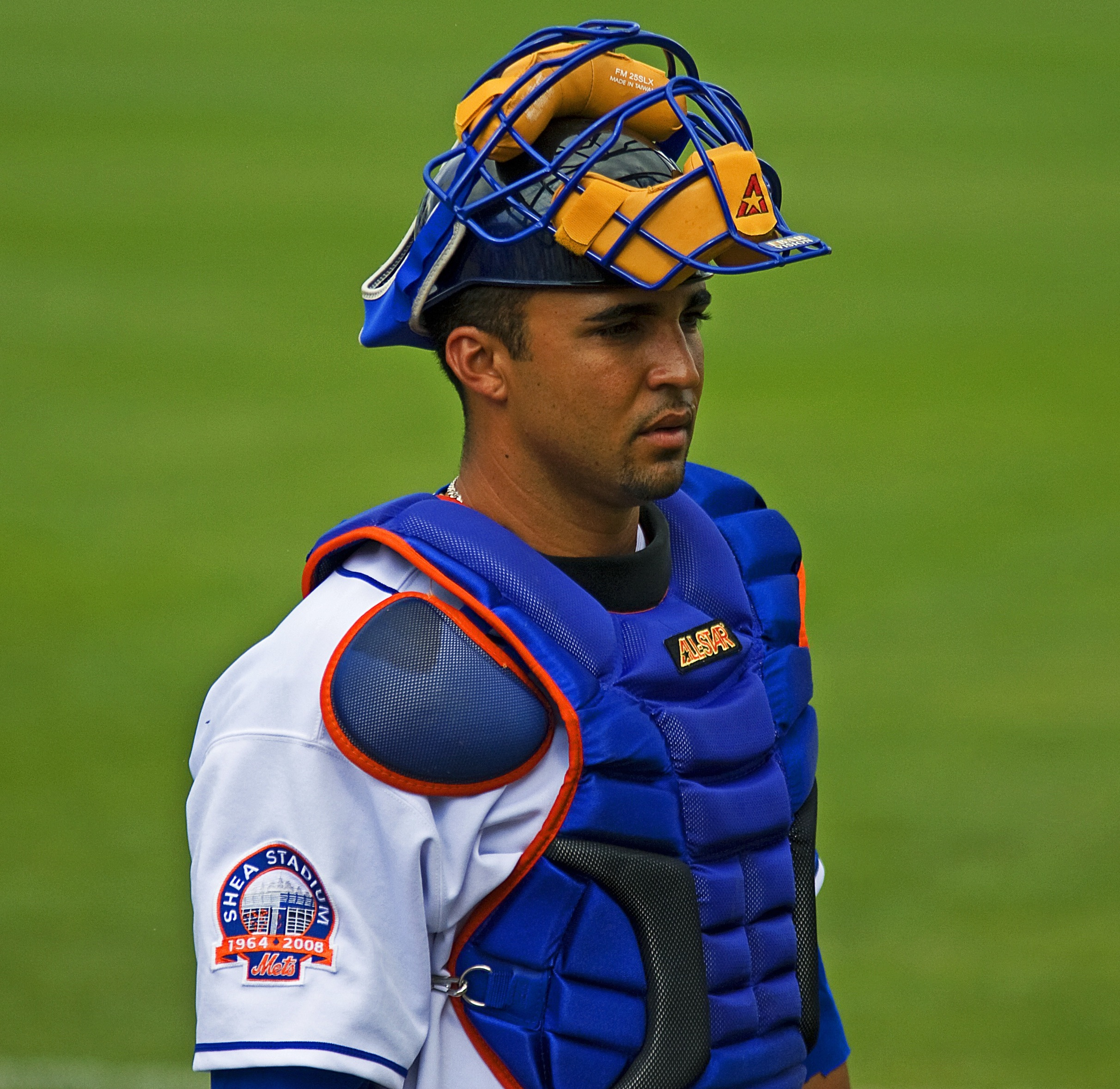
- Molina with the New York Mets
- Catcher
- Born: February 24, 1982 (age 44); La Guaira, Venezuela
- Batted: Right Threw: Right

MLB debut
- April 2, 2007, for the Chicago White Sox

Last MLB appearance
- April 28, 2011, for the New York Yankees

MLB statistics
- Batting average: .128
- Home runs: 0
- Runs batted in: 1
- Stats at Baseball Reference

Teams
- Chicago White Sox (2007); Baltimore Orioles (2007); New York Mets (2008); Boston Red Sox (2010); New York Yankees (2011)

Gustavo Molina (born February 24, 1982) is a Venezuelan former professional baseball catcher. He played in Major League Baseball for the Chicago White Sox, Baltimore Orioles, New York Mets, Boston Red Sox, and New York Yankees from 2007 to 2011.

== Career ==
=== Chicago White Sox ===
Molina was originally signed as an undrafted free agent by the Chicago White Sox on January 3, 2000. He spent seven years in the minor leagues with the White Sox organization before making his major league debut on April 2, 2007, with the White Sox. He was on the White Sox' opening day roster due to backup catcher Toby Hall being placed on the disabled list. During Molina's short one-and-a-half month tenure with the White Sox, he went 1–18 with one RBI. He got his first hit against the New York Yankees at U.S. Cellular Field. Shortly after, once Hall returned, he was sent down to the minors.

=== Baltimore Orioles ===
On July 30, 2007, Molina was claimed off waivers by the Baltimore Orioles, who immediately sent him to play with the Bowie Baysox, the Orioles' Double-A team.

=== New York Mets ===
In December 2007, Molina signed a minor league contract with the New York Mets and became a free agent at the end of the season.

=== Washington Nationals ===
On December 23, 2008, he signed a minor league contract with the Washington Nationals.

=== Boston Red Sox ===
On January 29, 2010, the Boston Red Sox signed Molina to a minor league contract. On June 29, 2010, he was purchased to replace Víctor Martínez, who was placed on the DL. On July 18, he was designated for assignment. Molina was one of six catchers Boston used during the 2010 season.

=== New York Yankees ===
Molina signed a minor league contract with an invitation to spring training with the New York Yankees for the 2011 season. He made six plate appearances for the Yankees, recording one hit before being optioned back to Triple-A. For the Scranton/Wilkes-Barre Yankees, Molina recorded a .239 batting average, two home runs and 17 runs batted in. He was designated for assignment on August 19, and returned to the minors. For the 2012 season, Molina re-signed with the Yankees organization, and opened the season with their AA Eastern League affiliate in Trenton.

=== Southern Maryland Blue Crabs ===
He became a free agent from the Southern Maryland Blue Crabs after the 2016 season.

=== Bridgeport Bluefish ===
On June 29, 2017, Molina signed with the Bridgeport Bluefish of the Atlantic League of Professional Baseball. He became a free agent on November 1, 2017, when the Bridgeport Bluefish folded.

== Coaching career ==
In 2025, Molina was named as manager of the ACL Reds the rookie-level affiliate of the Cincinnati Reds. In 2026, Molina was named as a coach for the Dayton Dragons the Reds High-A affiliate.

== See also ==
- List of Major League Baseball players from Venezuela
