= Brian Gordon (baseball) =

American baseball player (born 1978)

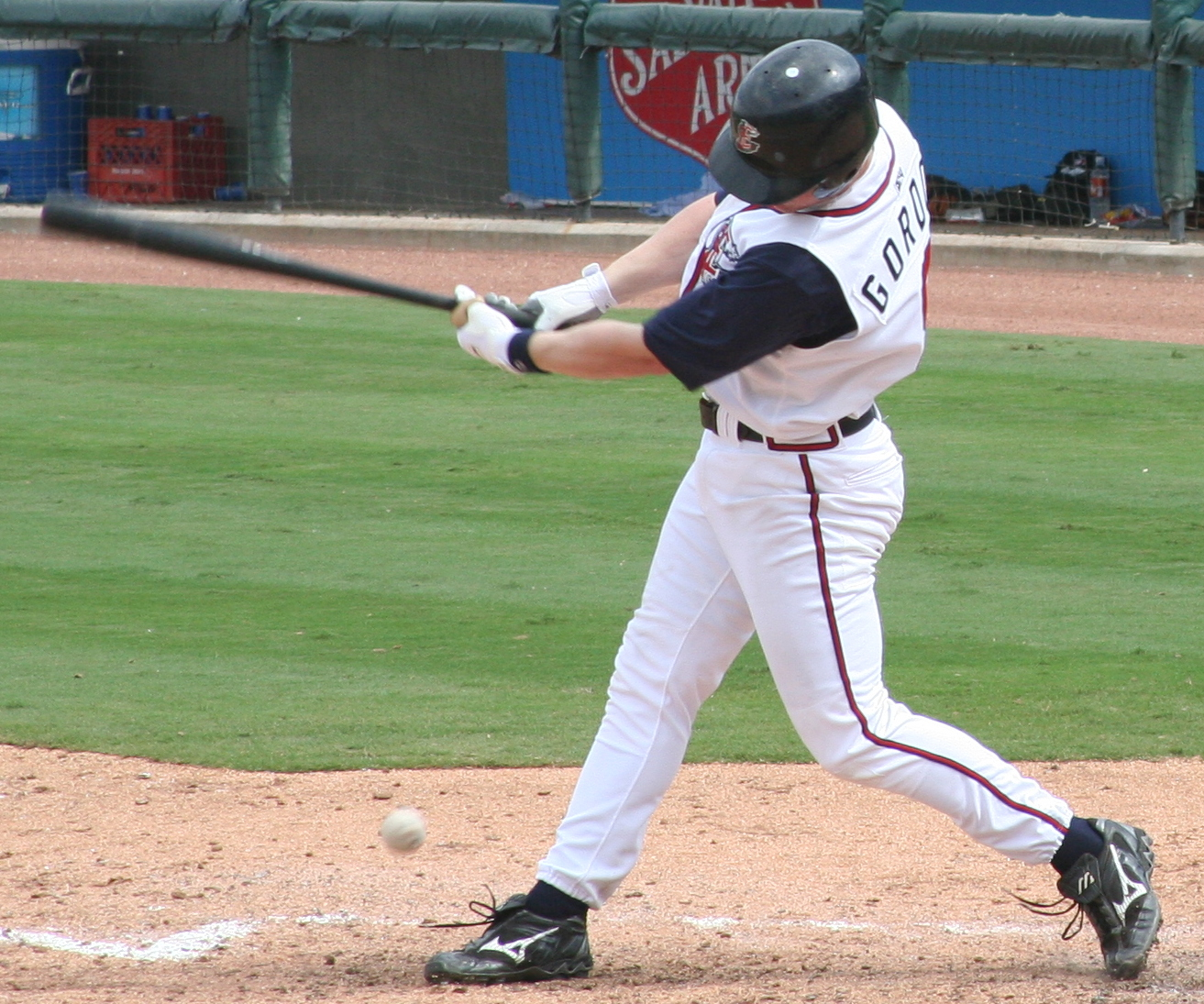
- Gordon with the Round Rock Express in 2006
- Pitcher
- Born: August 16, 1978 (age 47); West Point, New York, U.S.
- Batted: Left Threw: Right

Professional debut
- MLB: September 17, 2008, for the Texas Rangers
- KBO: July 17, 2011, for the SK Wyverns

Last appearance
- MLB: June 22, 2011, for the New York Yankees
- KBO: October 29, 2012, for the Samsung Lions

MLB statistics
- Win–loss record: 0–1
- Earned run average: 4.40
- Strikeouts: 5

KBO statistics
- Win–loss record: 17–7
- Earned run average: 3.89
- Strikeouts: 150
- Stats at Baseball Reference

Teams
- Texas Rangers (2008); New York Yankees (2011); SK Wyverns (2011); Samsung Lions (2012)

Career highlights and awards
- Korean Series champion (2012)

Brian Ernest Gordon (born August 16, 1978) is an American former professional baseball pitcher. He played for the Texas Rangers and New York Yankees of Major League Baseball (MLB), and for the SK Wyverns and Samsung Lions of the Korea Baseball Organization (KBO).

== Personal life ==
His parents are Ernie Gordon, who grew up a Yankees fan in Hyde Park, New York, and Wendy Abrahamsen. They have since divorced. His father was an Army engineer stationed at West Point when he was born, but the family moved to Round Rock, Texas, before he was 2 years old.

At Round Rock High School, his career record was 43–3, and his team, the Dragons, won the Texas class 5A state championship in 1997.

Gordon and his wife, Amanda, have a daughter, Finley and a son, Riggs.

== Professional career ==
Gordon was drafted by the Arizona Diamondbacks in the 7th round of the 1997 Major League Baseball draft as an outfielder. With the Diamondbacks organization, he made it as high as Triple-A Tucson in 2003 and became a free agent after the season. Gordon signed with the Anaheim Angels where he played in the next two years with their Triple-A affiliate, Salt Lake Stingers. After the 2005 season, Gordon signed with the Houston Astros organization. Playing the entire year in Triple-A, he batted only .241, and after the season decided to convert to pitcher with the help of Hall-of-Famer Nolan Ryan, who was a special assistant to the Astros.

Gordon began 2007 with the Double-A Corpus Christi Hooks. In 30 relief appearances, he had an ERA of 2.88 and received a promotion to Triple-A Round Rock. In 2008, Gordon started the season with Double-A Corpus Christi, but after just one appearance, he was released. He signed with the Texas Rangers and did not allow a run in 22 innings pitched for Double-A Frisco. He was promoted to Triple-A Oklahoma where he started and pitched in relief. Gordon was a September call up for the Rangers in 2008 and made his major league debut on September 17.

Gordon attended Venezuelan Winter League for the 2008–2009 season with Tiburones de la Guaira, posting a 4–2 record with a 1.79 ERA in 45.1 innings. In his last home game before returning to the US, Gordon faced hard rivals Leones del Caracas in front of a crowd of 20,000, posting 8 innings with 1 allowed run and 9 strikeouts. After the game ended, all la Guaira fans shouted Brian's last name, with Gordon walking out of the dugout and kissing the team's shirt in one of La Guaira's most emotive moments of the season.

Gordon was granted free agency after the 2009 season and he signed with the Philadelphia Phillies for the 2010 season. He remained with the Phillies for the start of the 2011 season.

On June 14, 2011, Gordon opted out of his minor league contract with the Phillies and signed with the New York Yankees, who promoted him to the major leagues. In his first MLB start, Gordon pitched 5 1/3 innings for the Yankees, allowing two earned runs in a Yankees 3–2 victory in 12 innings at Yankee Stadium. He made history by wearing a non-leather glove, the first major leaguer to do so. When Bartolo Colón was activated from the disabled list on July 2, he was optioned to the Triple-A Scranton/Wilkes-Barre Yankees.

He was purchased by SK Wyverns in Korea on July 8, 2011. On January 13, 2012, Gordon opted to stay in Korea, signing with the Samsung Lions.

Gordon was signed by the New York Yankees to a minor-league contract on December 3, 2013. On June 15, 2014, the Yankees released Gordon.
