= Andrew Brackman =

American baseball player (born 1985)

- Pitcher
- Born: December 4, 1985 (age 40); Cincinnati, Ohio, U.S.
- Batted: Right Threw: Right

MLB debut
- September 22, 2011, for the New York Yankees

Last MLB appearance
- September 28, 2011, for the New York Yankees

MLB statistics
- Games pitched: 3
- Earned run average: 0.00
- Strikeouts: 0
- Stats at Baseball Reference

Teams
- New York Yankees (2011)
Medals
Men's baseball
Representing United States
World University Championship
Gold medal – first place	2006 Havana	National team

Andrew Warren Brackman (born December 4, 1985) is an American former Major League Baseball (MLB) pitcher who played for the New York Yankees in 2011.

== High school career ==
Brackman attended Moeller High School in Cincinnati, Ohio.

== College career ==
Brackman attended North Carolina State University where he played two seasons as a dual-sport athlete, in basketball and baseball. During his freshman basketball season (2004–2005), he played center and forward averaging 7.4 points and 3.5 rebounds.

In his freshman baseball season, he was 4–0 with a 2.09 ERA in 10 appearances as both a reliever starting pitcher. He was starting pitcher of the first game of the 2005 ACC baseball tournament, striking out five batters in seven innings to earn the victory against the Miami Hurricanes. He was named a second-team preseason All-America player by Baseball America for 2006.

After the Wolfpack were defeated in the 2006 NCAA tournament second round by Texas, Brackman chose not to return to the basketball team the next season, and instead focused on developing his pitching with hopes of doing well in professional baseball.

Brackman suffered a stress fracture to his hip in his sophomore year of baseball, limiting him to only seven games and a disappointing 1–4 record with a 6.09 ERA. In the summer of 2006, he pitched for the Orleans Cardinals in the Cape Cod League earning a 1–0 record with a 1.09 ERA. This effort led to Baseball America ranking him the league's number two prospect.

Brackman's junior year at NC State saw a return to his freshman-year numbers: in 13 games he struck out 74 batters in 78 innings with a 3.81 ERA and a record of 6–4. Due to elbow injuries, he did not pitch in either the ACC nor the NCAA tournament.

== Professional career ==
=== New York Yankees ===
Brackman's injury record hurt his draft value, and he was not selected until the 30th pick of the 2007 Major League Baseball draft. Following the draft, the Yankees signed Brackman to a guaranteed $4.5 million deal for four years including a $3.55 million signing bonus spread out over six years. Brackman was represented by sports agent Scott Boras. The club also held options over Brackman for the 2011, 2012, and 2013 seasons which would have boosted the total value of his contract over $13 million if he met his bonus requirements. As specified by his contract, the Yankees placed Brackman on the 40 man roster.

The Yankees recommended that he see Dr. James Andrews in Alabama to address his lingering elbow concerns. Later in August 2007, he underwent Tommy John surgery. Brackman began the 2008 season on the 60-day disabled list, a procedural move to keep him on the 40-man roster. Despite this setback, the Yankees still considered him a "blue-chip prospect". On February 1, 2008, Keith Law of ESPN ranked Brackman in the top 100 baseball prospects of 2008, and both Baseball America and Baseball Prospectus list him as in the Yankees' top ten prospects for 2009.

Brackman spent 2009 pitching for the Class A Charleston RiverDogs, where he struggled. Baseball America named him the Yankees' tenth best prospect for 2010. Brackman had a strong 2010 season with the Class A Advanced Tampa Yankees and Class AA Trenton Thunder.

The Yankees optioned Brackman to AAA at the beginning of the 2011 season. Going into 2011, Brackman was rated the third-best prospect in the Yankees organization by Baseball America. He struggled to throw strikes to begin the season, and considered quitting baseball entirely. Instead, Brackman altered his mechanics, which produced improved results. He was promoted to the Yankees in September and made his MLB debut on September 22. Brackman allowed no runs over an inning and a third in relief against the Tampa Bay Rays.

Following the 2011 season, the Yankees declined his 2012 option, making him a free agent.

=== Cincinnati Reds ===
On January 4, 2012, Brackman signed a one-year minor league contract with the Cincinnati Reds. He was designated for assignment at the end of July and outrighted to the minors.

=== Chicago White Sox ===
On January 30, 2013, Brackman signed a minor league contract with the Chicago White Sox. He was later released on August 6.

== Pitching style ==
At the time he was drafted by the Yankees, Brackman threw a 92 to 97 mph fastball that had touched 99 mph. He also has had a two-seam fastball, knuckle curve, and a changeup in his repertoire. His height and overhand action were cited by scouts as giving his pitches a desirable "downward plane".
