= Cory Wade =

American baseball player (born 1983)

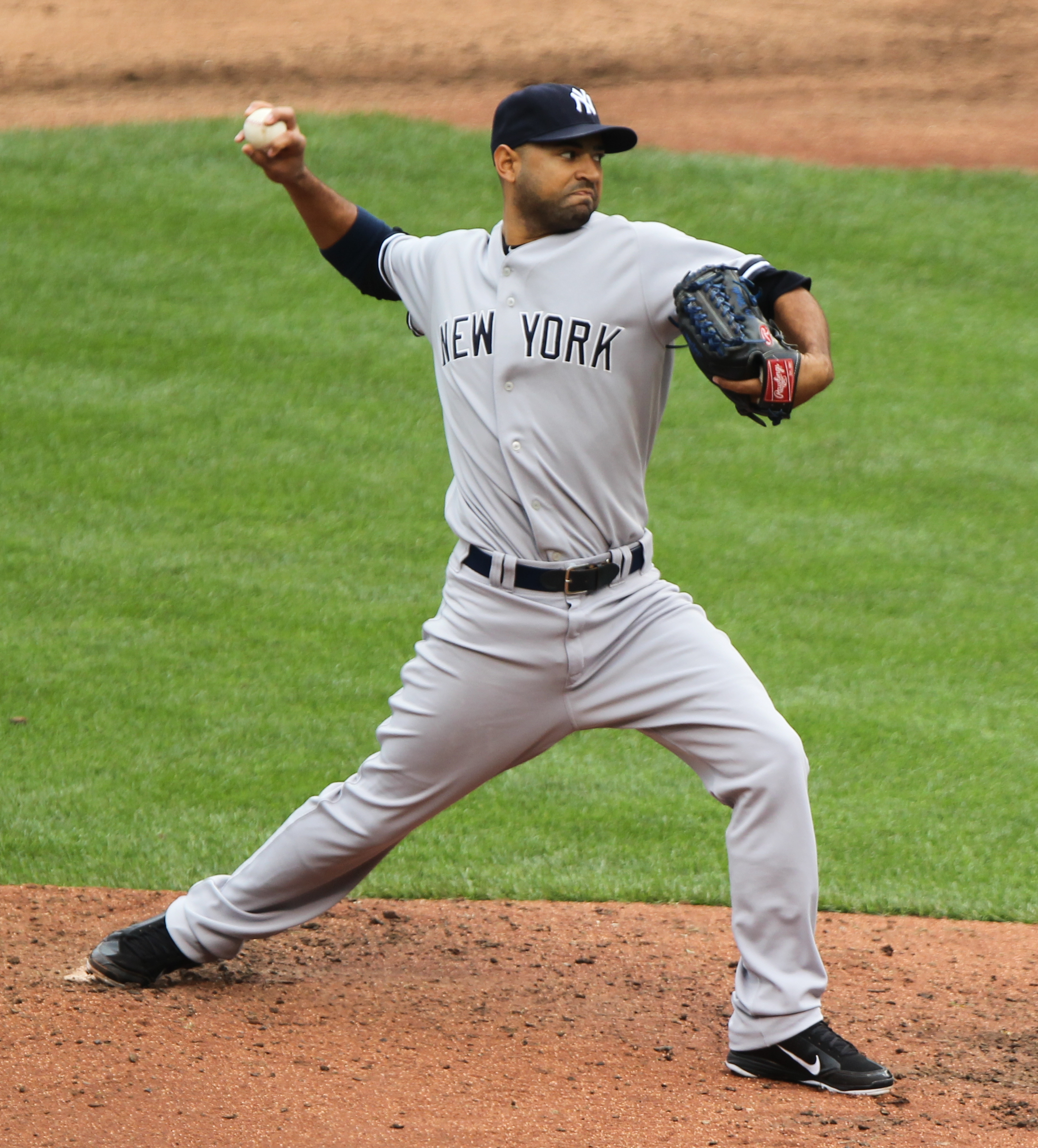
- Wade with the Yankees, September 2011
- Relief pitcher
- Born: May 28, 1983 (age 42); Indianapolis, Indiana, U.S.
- Batted: Right Threw: Right

MLB debut
- April 24, 2008, for the Los Angeles Dodgers

Last MLB appearance
- September 24, 2012, for the New York Yankees

MLB statistics
- Win–loss record: 11–6
- Earned run average: 3.65
- Strikeouts: 137
- Stats at Baseball Reference

Teams
- Los Angeles Dodgers (2008–2009); New York Yankees (2011–2012)

Cory Nathaniel Wade (born May 28, 1983) is an American former professional baseball relief pitcher. He played in Major League Baseball with the Los Angeles Dodgers and New York Yankees.

== Amateur career ==
Wade attended Broad Ripple High School.

Wade played both pitcher and shortstop at Kentucky Wesleyan College, the only college that recruited him. As a junior in 2004, he was 5–4 with a 2.39 earned run average (ERA) in 12 games (10 starts) while striking out 84 batters in 71 2/3 innings.

== Baseball career ==
=== Los Angeles Dodgers ===
Wade was selected in the 10th round of the 2004 Major League Baseball draft by the Los Angeles Dodgers. With the Dodgers organization, he pitched for the Gulf Coast Dodgers, Ogden Raptors, Columbus Catfish, Vero Beach Dodgers, Inland Empire 66ers, and Jacksonville Suns. He was selected to play in the South Atlantic League All-Star game in 2006.

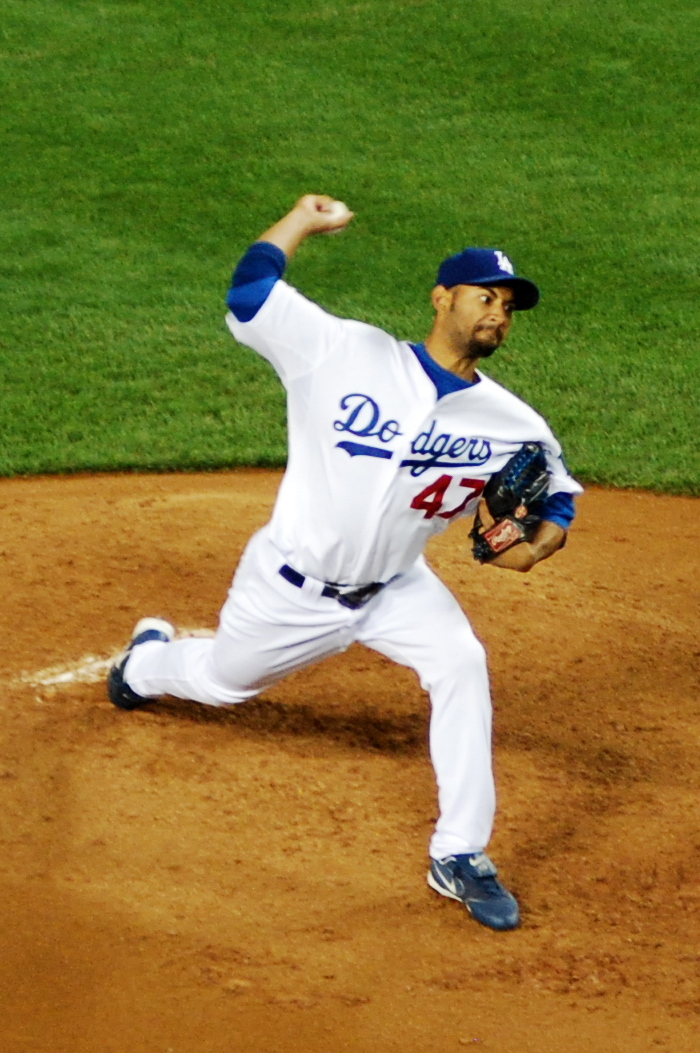
Cory Wade pitching for the Los Angeles Dodgers against the Houston Astros in 2008

In 2007, Wade played in the Arizona Fall League, he was also added to the Dodgers 40-man roster.

Wade made his major league debut on April 24, 2008, for the Dodgers, working one inning in relief against the Arizona Diamondbacks. During his rookie season, Wade allowed 51 hits in 71 1/3 innings, and had a 2.27 ERA. By the 2008 postseason, Dodgers manager Joe Torre used Wade as his top setup pitcher, pitching Wade in the eighth inning.

He struggled in the 2009 season, with a 5.53 ERA in 27 games and was demoted to spend most of the season in AAA with the Albuquerque Isotopes. He underwent shoulder surgery in March 2010 and was placed on the 60-day disabled list to start the season. He was activated off the DL on July 1 and outrighted to AAA, removing him from the 40-man roster.

In 2010 with the Isotopes, Wade was 3–0 with a 4.91 ERA in 21 games.

=== Tampa Bay Rays ===
He signed a minor league contract with the Tampa Bay Rays before the 2011 season, but was later granted his release in June. He had a 1.23 ERA in 36 2/3 innings with the Rays Triple-A affiliate, the Durham Bulls.

=== New York Yankees ===
On June 13, 2011, he signed a minor league contract with the New York Yankees. He was assigned to the Triple-A Scranton/Wilkes-Barre Yankees. However, he had his contract purchased a day later. He made his first appearance with the NY Yankees in relief on June 15 against the Texas Rangers, pitching a scoreless inning, retiring all three batters he faced, striking out one. On June 16, he got the win in a 12 inning game when the Yankees defeated the Texas Rangers, retiring all six batters he faced in order.

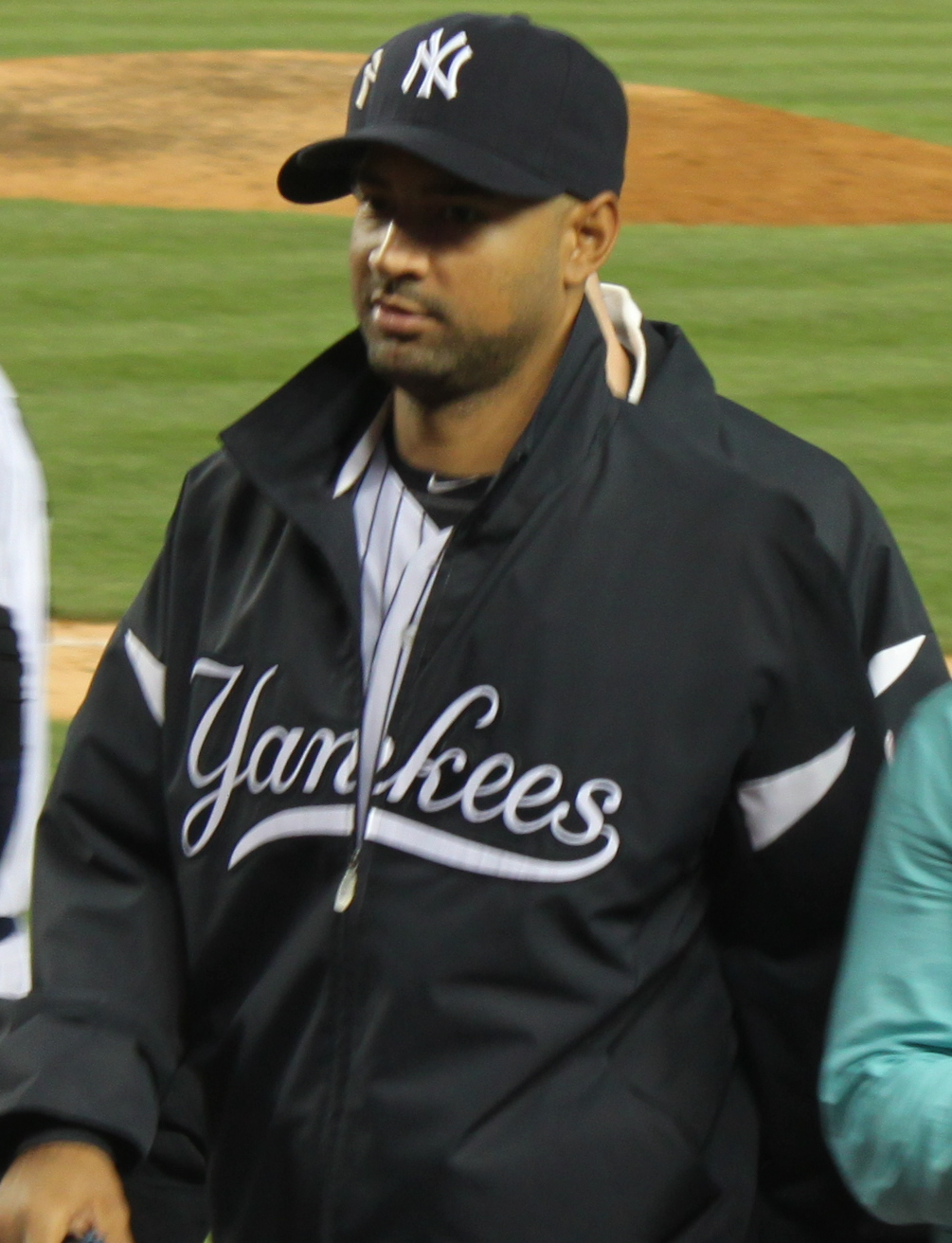
Wade with the Yankees in 2011

Wade and the Yankees agreed to a one-year non-guaranteed deal worth approximately $500,000 on January 12, 2012. He was optioned to Triple-A on July 2, 2012, after the team activated Chad Qualls, who was acquired from the Philadelphia Phillies. He was called up on September 1, 2012. The Yankees designated Wade for assignment following the regular season.

=== Toronto Blue Jays ===
Wade was claimed off waivers by the Toronto Blue Jays on October 17, 2012. They designated him for assignment on November 20 and removed him from the 40 man roster. After clearing waivers, Wade refused an assignment to the Buffalo Bisons and became a free agent.

=== Chicago Cubs ===
On December 13, 2012, the Chicago Cubs signed Wade to a minor league contract with an invitation to major league spring training. He pitched for their Triple A affiliate Iowa Cubs before being released on May 6, 2013.

=== Tampa Bay Rays ===
On May 13, 2013, Wade signed with the Tampa Bay Rays as a free agent and was assigned to their Triple A team, Durham Bulls.

=== New York Mets ===
On August 31, 2013, Wade signed a minor league deal with the New York Mets.

=== Kansas City Royals ===
On November 14, 2013, Wade signed a minor league contract with the Kansas City Royals. He was released on April 23, 2014.

=== Lancaster Barnstormers ===
After his release by the Royals, Wade signed with the Lancaster Barnstormers of the Atlantic League of Professional Baseball in June 2014.

=== Pitching style ===
Wade's main pitches are a four-seam fastball that ranges from 86 to 90 miles per hour (138–145 km/h), a cutter that ranges from 84 to 86 miles per hour (135–138 km/h), a changeup that breaks away from left-handers and averages between 79 and 83 miles per hour (127–134 km/h), and a traditional 12-6 curveball that ranges from 74 to 77 miles per hour (119–124 km/h), that he uses more commonly against right-handers. Although he does not use them frequently, Wade also has a two-seam fastball and slider—both of which he uses mainly against right-handed hitters. Though he lacks the size and premium fastball velocity of the prototypical late-inning relief pitcher, Wade has above-average command and is adept at using his off-speed pitches to induce weak contact.

== Post playing ==
In 2015, Wade was hired by the San Diego Padres as a scout. He left the Padres organization in 2023 to work with scouting startup ScoutUs Pro.

== Personal ==
Wade and his wife, Mikaela, have two kids, Amaya and Camden.
