= Mariano Rivera =

Panamanian-American baseball player (born 1969)

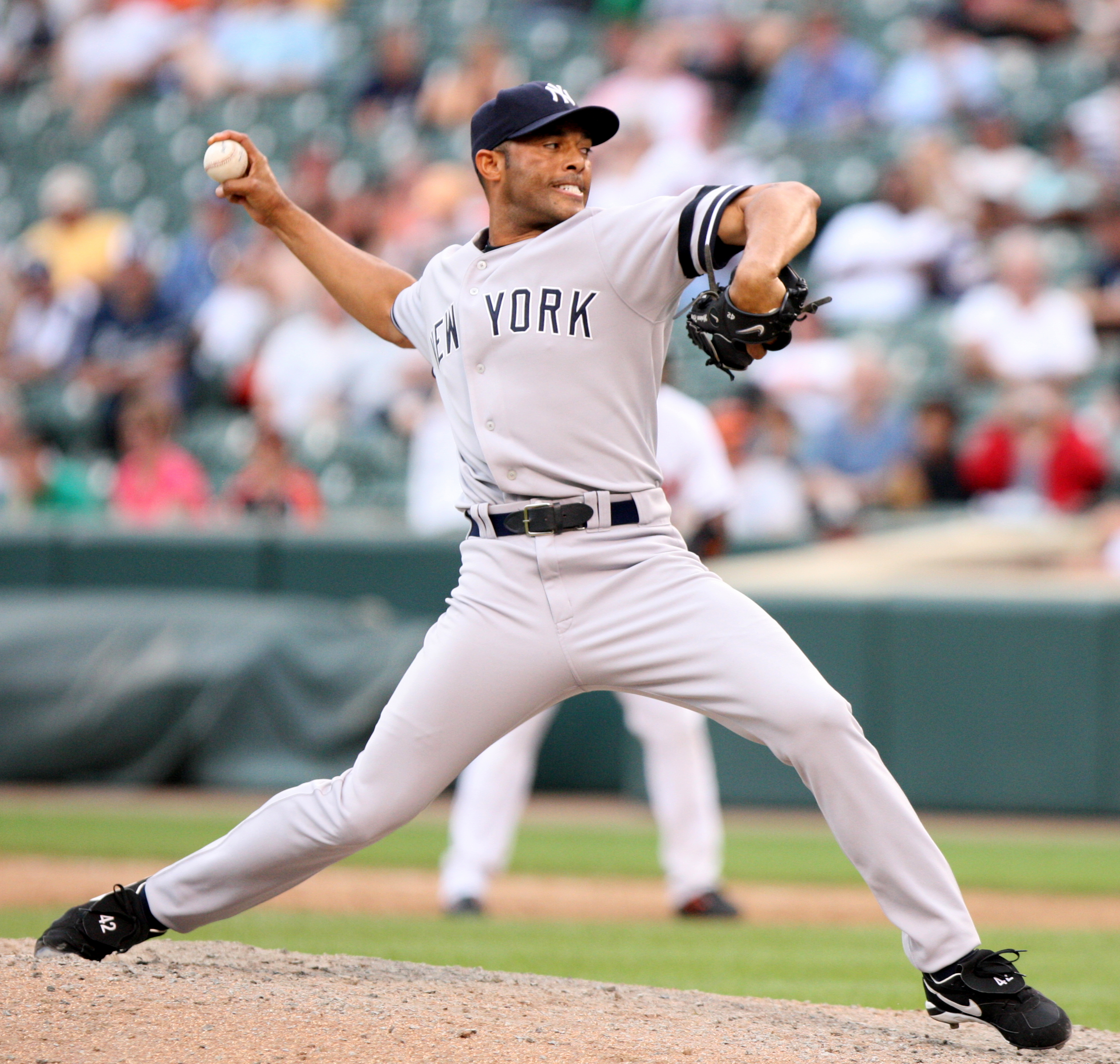
- Rivera with the New York Yankees in 2007
- Relief pitcher
- Born: November 29, 1969 (age 56); Panama City, Panama
- Batted: Right Threw: Right

MLB debut
- May 23, 1995, for the New York Yankees

Last MLB appearance
- September 26, 2013, for the New York Yankees

MLB statistics
- Win–loss record: 82–60
- Earned run average: 2.21
- Strikeouts: 1,173
- Saves: 652
- WHIP: 1.00
- Stats at Baseball Reference

Teams
- New York Yankees (1995–2013)

Career highlights and awards
- 13× All-Star (1997, 1999–2002, 2004–2006, 2008–2011, 2013); 5× World Series champion (1996, 1998–2000, 2009); World Series MVP (1999); ALCS MVP (2003); 5× AL Rolaids Relief Man Award (1999, 2001, 2004–2005, 2009); 3× Delivery Man of the Year (2005–2006, 2009); AL Comeback Player of the Year (2013); 3× MLB saves leader (1999, 2001, 2004); MLB record 652 career saves; Commissioner's Historic Achievement Award; New York Yankees No. 42 retired; Monument Park honoree

Member of the National

Baseball Hall of Fame
- Induction: 2019
- Vote: 100% (first ballot)

Mariano Rivera (Spanish pronunciation: [maˈɾjano riˈβeɾa]; born November 29, 1969) is a Panamanian-American former professional baseball player who was a pitcher for 19 seasons in Major League Baseball (MLB) for the New York Yankees, from 1995 to 2013. Nicknamed "Mo" and "Sandman", he spent most of his career as a relief pitcher and served as the Yankees' closer for 17 seasons. A 13-time All-Star and five-time World Series champion, he is MLB's career leader in saves (652) and games finished (952). Rivera won five American League (AL) Rolaids Relief Man Awards and three Delivery Man of the Year Awards, and he finished in the top three in voting for the AL Cy Young Award four times. In 2019, he was inducted into the Baseball Hall of Fame in his first year of eligibility, and is to date the only player ever to be elected unanimously by the Baseball Writers' Association of America (BBWAA).

Raised in the modest Panamanian fishing village of Puerto Caimito, Rivera was an amateur player until he was signed by the Yankees organization in 1990. He debuted in the major leagues in 1995 as a starting pitcher, before permanently converting to a relief pitcher late that year. After a breakthrough season in 1996 as a setup man, he became the Yankees' closer in 1997. In the following seasons, he established himself as one of baseball's top relievers, leading the major leagues in saves in 1999, 2001, and 2004. Rivera primarily threw a sharp-moving, mid-90s mile-per-hour cut fastball that frequently broke hitters' bats and earned a reputation as one of the league's toughest pitches to hit. With his presence at the end of games, signaled by his foreboding entrance song "Enter Sandman", Rivera was a key contributor to the Yankees' dynasty in the late 1990s and early 2000s that won four championships in five years. He was an accomplished postseason performer, winning the 1999 World Series Most Valuable Player (MVP) Award and the 2003 AL Championship Series MVP Award, while setting postseason records that included lowest earned run average (ERA) (0.70) and most saves (42).

Rivera is considered one of the most dominant relievers in major league history. Pitching with a longevity and consistency uncommon to the closer role, he saved at least 25 games in 15 consecutive seasons and posted an ERA under 2.00 in 11 seasons, both of which are records. When he retired, his career 2.21 ERA and 1.00 WHIP were the lowest in the live-ball era among qualified pitchers. Fellow players credit him with popularizing the cut fastball across the major leagues. Along with his signature pitch, Rivera was known for his precise control, smooth pitching motion, and composure on the field. In 2013, the Yankees retired his uniform number 42; he was the last major league player to wear the number full time, following its league-wide retirement in 1997 in honor of Jackie Robinson. In 2014, MLB named its AL Reliever of the Year Award in Rivera's honor.

A devout Christian, Rivera has been involved in charitable causes and the religious community through the Mariano Rivera Foundation. For his philanthropy, Rivera received the Presidential Medal of Freedom, the highest civilian award in the United States, in September 2019.

== Early life ==
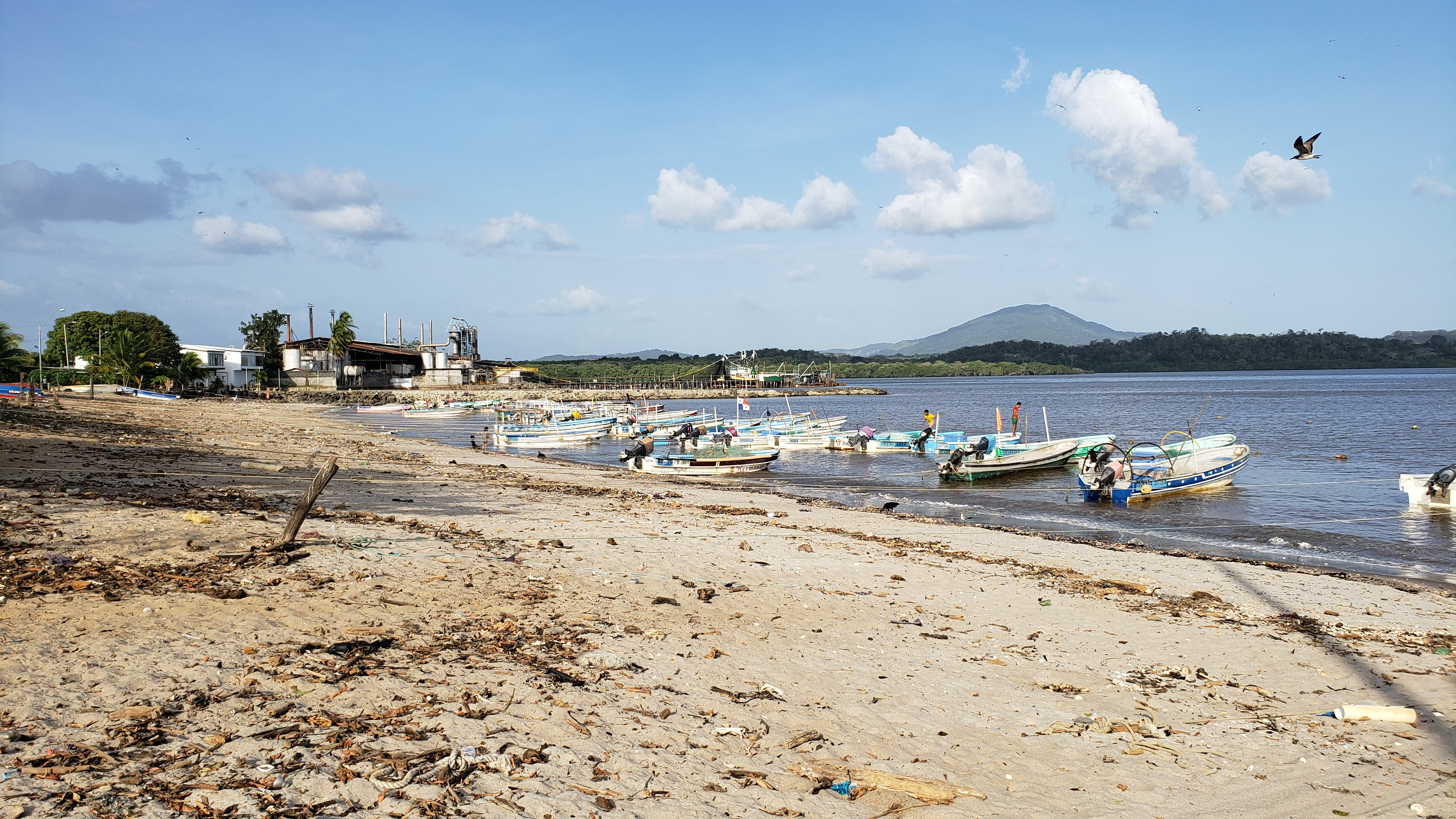
Rivera was raised in the Panamanian fishing village of Puerto Caimito.

Mariano Rivera was born on November 29, 1969, in Panama City, Panama, to Mariano Rivera Palacios and Delia Jiron. Rivera has one older sister, Delia, and two younger brothers, Alvaro and Giraldo. Supported by Mariano Sr.'s job as captain of a fishing boat, the family lived in Puerto Caimito, a Panamanian fishing village that Rivera described as "poor". As a young man, Rivera played soccer and baseball with his friends on the beach during low tide. Soccer was his favorite sport, and Pelé his favorite athlete. For baseball games, they substituted cardboard milk cartons for gloves and tree branches for bats, and they fashioned balls by taping wads of shredded fishing nets. Rivera used this makeshift equipment until his father bought him his first leather glove when he was 12 years old. Speaking about his youth, Rivera said that although he stayed out of trouble, he "was hanging with the wrong people".

Rivera attended Escuela Victoriano Chacón for elementary school and La Escuela Secundaria Pedro Pablo Sanchez for his secondary education, but he dropped out in ninth grade. At age 16, he began to learn the fishing trade by working on a commercial boat captained by his father, catching sardines. Rivera, who worked six-day weeks, year round, called the job "extremely hard" and was more interested in becoming a mechanic. He spent three years learning the fishing trade, saving the money he earned in hopes of opening an automobile repair shop. Two incidents on his father's boat validated his doubts about fishing as a career. In 1988, Rivera's uncle Miguel was lashed by an unsecured rope that shot off a hydraulic mechanism, and a month later he died from his injuries. About a year later, at age 19, Rivera was forced to abandon his father's ship after it began capsizing due to a malfunctioning water pump and an overweight load of fish.

Rivera continued to play sports during his teenage years but eventually quit soccer around age 17 after a series of ankle and knee injuries. Consequently, he shifted his attention to baseball, though he considered it a hobby rather than a potential profession. At age 18, Rivera joined the Panamá Oeste Vaqueros, a local amateur baseball team, as a utility player. Herb Raybourn, a scout, watched him play shortstop in a 1988 baseball tournament but did not project him to be a major leaguer. A year later, Panamá Oeste's pitcher performed so poorly in a playoff game that Rivera was asked to replace him, and despite no experience at the position, he pitched well. Teammates Claudino Hernández and Emilio Gáez consequently contacted Chico Heron, a scout for the New York Yankees of Major League Baseball (MLB). Two weeks after his pitching debut, Rivera was invited to a Yankees tryout camp run by Heron in Panama City. Raybourn, who had returned to Panama to scout as the Yankees' director of Latin American operations, received a tip about Rivera. Raybourn was surprised to hear he had switched positions but decided to watch him throw. Although Rivera lacked formal pitching training, weighed just 155 pounds (70 kg), and threw only 85–87 miles per hour (137–140 kilometers per hour), Raybourn was impressed by his athleticism and smooth, effortless pitching motion. Viewing the free agent Rivera as a raw talent, Raybourn signed him to a contract with the Yankees organization on February 17, 1990; the contract included a signing bonus of US$2,500 ($6,161 today), according to MLB records.

== Professional baseball career ==
=== Minor leagues (1990–1995) ===
After signing his contract, Rivera—who spoke no English and had never left home before—flew to the United States and reported to the Gulf Coast League (GCL) Yankees, a Rookie level minor-league affiliate of the New York Yankees. Feeling lonely and homesick, he wrote home to his parents often, as they did not have access to telephones in Puerto Caimito. At that point in his career, scouts considered Rivera to be a "fringe prospect" at best, but he made progress with a strong 1990 season for the GCL Yankees. Pitching mostly in relief, he allowed only 24 baserunners and one earned run in 52 innings pitched—a 0.17 earned run average (ERA). The team permitted Rivera to start the season's final game in order for him to accumulate enough innings pitched to qualify for the league's ERA title (which carried a $500 bonus); his subsequent seven-inning no-hitter "put him on the map with the organization", according to manager Glenn Sherlock. In the offseason, Rivera returned to Panama and tipped Raybourn off about a promising local player, Rivera's 16-year-old cousin Rubén, whom the Yankees consequently signed.

In 1991, Rivera was promoted to the Class A level Greensboro Hornets of the South Atlantic League, where he started 15 of the 29 games in which he pitched. Despite a 4–9 win–loss record, he recorded a 2.75 ERA in 114 2/3 innings pitched and struck out 123 batters while walking 36 batters. New York Yankees manager Buck Showalter took notice of Rivera's strong strikeout-to-walk ratio, calling it "impressive in any league" and saying, "This guy is going to make it." A minor-league scout for the Cincinnati Reds filed a report that season about Rivera that said: "long arms w/ slender strong body, loose actions...will challenge in velocity...maturity is a question, consistency is a question...consistency will need to be maintained to improve and advance."

In 1992, Rivera was promoted to the Class A-Advanced level Fort Lauderdale Yankees of the Florida State League (FSL), but he missed the first third of the season with elbow stiffness. He started ten games for Fort Lauderdale, compiling a 5–3 win–loss record and a 2.28 ERA, while walking only five batters in 59 1/3 innings pitched. Ultimately, Rivera was sidelined again after suffering damage to the ulnar collateral ligament (UCL) in his right elbow. The injury was attributed to him snapping his wrist during his throwing motion in an attempt to improve the movement of his slider.

Rivera underwent elbow surgery on August 27, 1992, leading to concerns that he would be out through the 1993 season. Contrary to popular belief, the operation was not Tommy John surgery; Rivera's surgeon, Frank Jobe, determined that ligament replacement was not necessary and instead repaired the frayed UCL. Rivera was left unprotected by the Yankees in MLB's 1992 expansion draft, which filled the rosters for two expansion teams, the Florida Marlins and Colorado Rockies. At one point in the draft, Marlins general manager Dave Dombrowski was planning to select Rivera with his next pick, but after the Rockies chose Yankee Brad Ausmus, the Yankees were shielded from losing any more players; Rivera went undrafted.

During Rivera's rehabilitation, he played catch with former Yankees pitchers Whitey Ford and Ron Guidry, and faced batting practice from his first minor-league pitching coach, former pitcher Hoyt Wilhelm. After recuperating, Rivera pitched an abbreviated 1993 season for the Rookie-level Yankees and Class A Greensboro, during which he was kept on a limited pitch count. Hornets shortstop Derek Jeter, who would later be Rivera's teammate in the major leagues, tracked his pitch count during games. In 12 starts, Rivera recorded a 2.08 ERA, walking 16 batters in 43 1/3 innings pitched. Watching him recover, the Hornets' official scorer Ogi Overman was not optimistic about Rivera's future, saying, "I thought [he] was on a one-way trip to nowhere."

Rivera began the 1994 season with the Class A-Advanced level Tampa Yankees of the FSL. In June, he was promoted to the Double-A level Albany-Colonie Yankees of the Eastern League, followed by a promotion to the Triple-A level Columbus Clippers of the International League in July. Rivera finished his season with a 10–2 record and a 3.09 ERA overall, but he struggled in Columbus, recording a 5.81 ERA in six starts. At the start of the 1995 season, he was ranked the ninth-best prospect in the Yankees organization by sports magazine Baseball America; by contrast, Rivera's highly touted cousin Rubén was ranked the second-best prospect in the entire sport. Mariano's pitching repertoire primarily consisted of fastballs at the time, with a slider and changeup as secondary pitches. He began the 1995 season with Columbus, pitching to a 1–1 record and a 1.50 ERA in four starts.

=== Major leagues (1995–2013) ===
==== 1995–1997 ====
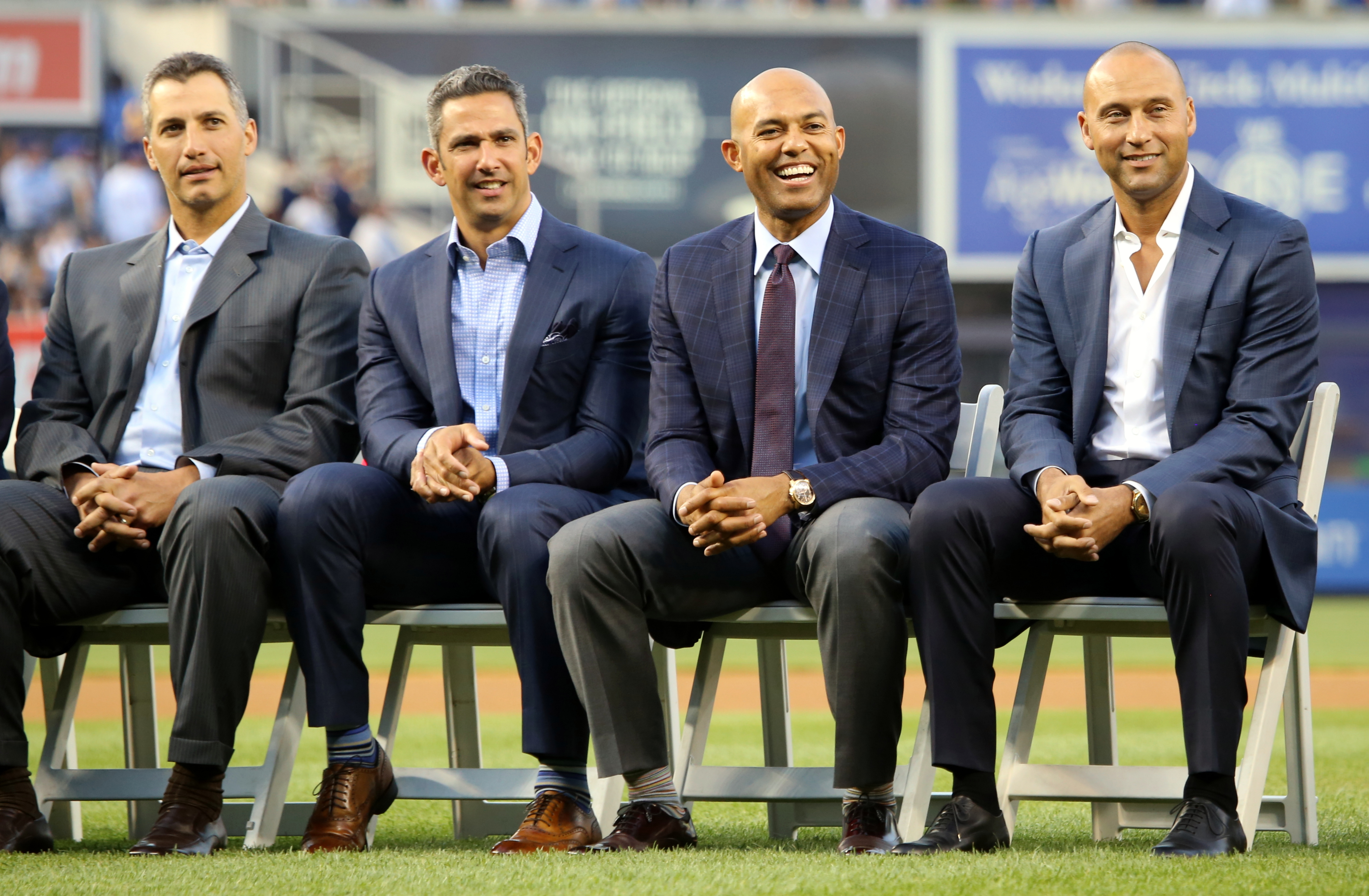
Rivera with his fellow Core Four teammates in 2015 (from left to right: Andy Pettitte, Jorge Posada, Rivera, and Derek Jeter). All four made their major league debuts for the Yankees in 1995.

After being called up to the major leagues on May 16, 1995, Rivera made his debut for the New York Yankees on May 23 against the California Angels. Starting in place of injured pitcher Jimmy Key, Rivera allowed five earned runs in 3 1/3 innings pitched in a 10–0 loss. He struggled through his first four major league starts, posting a 10.20 ERA, and as a result, he was demoted to Columbus on June 11. As a 25-year-old rookie just three years removed from major arm surgery, Rivera did not have a guaranteed spot in the Yankee organization. Management considered trading him to the Detroit Tigers for starter David Wells.

While recovering from a sore shoulder in the minor leagues, Rivera pitched a no-hit shutout in a rain-shortened five-inning start on June 26. Reports from the game indicated that his pitches had reached 95–96 mph (153–154 km/h), about 6 mph (9.7 km/h) faster than his previous average velocity; Rivera attributes his inexplicable improvement to God. Yankees general manager Gene Michael was skeptical of the reports until verifying that Columbus' radar gun was not faulty and that another team's scout had taken the same measurements. Afterwards, he ended any trade negotiations involving Rivera. On July 4, in his first start back in the major leagues, Rivera pitched eight scoreless innings against the Chicago White Sox, allowing just two hits while striking out 11 batters. In five subsequent starts, he was unable to match his success from that game. After a brief demotion to Columbus in August, Rivera made one last start in the major leagues in September before he was moved to the Yankees' bullpen. Overall, he finished his first major league season with a 5–3 record and a 5.51 ERA in ten starts and nine relief outings. His performance in the American League Division Series against the Seattle Mariners, in which he pitched 5 1/3 scoreless innings of relief, convinced Yankees management to keep him and convert him to a relief pitcher the following season.

"He needs to pitch in a higher league, if there is one. Ban him from baseball. He should be illegal."

— Tom Kelly, manager of the Minnesota Twins, after his team faced Rivera in April 1996

Rivera was nearly traded prior to the 1996 season to address the Yankees' depleted depth at the shortstop position. Owner George Steinbrenner considered an offer to send Rivera to the Mariners in exchange for shortstop Félix Fermín, but Yankees management convinced Steinbrenner to instead entrust the position to rookie Derek Jeter. In 1996, Rivera served primarily as a setup pitcher, typically pitching in the seventh and eighth innings of games before closer John Wetteland pitched in the ninth. Their effectiveness as a tandem helped the Yankees win 70 of 73 games that season when leading after six innings. Over a stretch of games between April 19 and May 21, Rivera pitched 26 consecutive scoreless innings, including 15 consecutive hitless innings. During the streak, he recorded his first career save in a May 17 game against the Angels. Rivera finished the regular season with a 2.09 ERA in 107 2/3 innings pitched and set a Yankees single-season record for strikeouts by a reliever (130). Baseball Reference calculated his value to the Yankees that year to be 5.0 wins above replacement (WAR), a figure no reliever has surpassed in a single season since. In the postseason, he allowed just one earned run in 14 1/3 innings pitched, helping the Yankees advance to and win the 1996 World Series against the Atlanta Braves. It was the franchise's first World Series championship since 1978. In MLB's annual awards voting by the Baseball Writers' Association of America (BBWAA), Rivera finished in twelfth place for the American League (AL) Most Valuable Player (MVP) Award and third for the AL Cy Young Award, which is given to the league's best pitcher. Commentator and former player Tim McCarver said that the Yankees "revolutionized baseball" that year with Rivera, calling him "a middle reliever who should have been on the All-Star team and who was a legitimate MVP candidate".

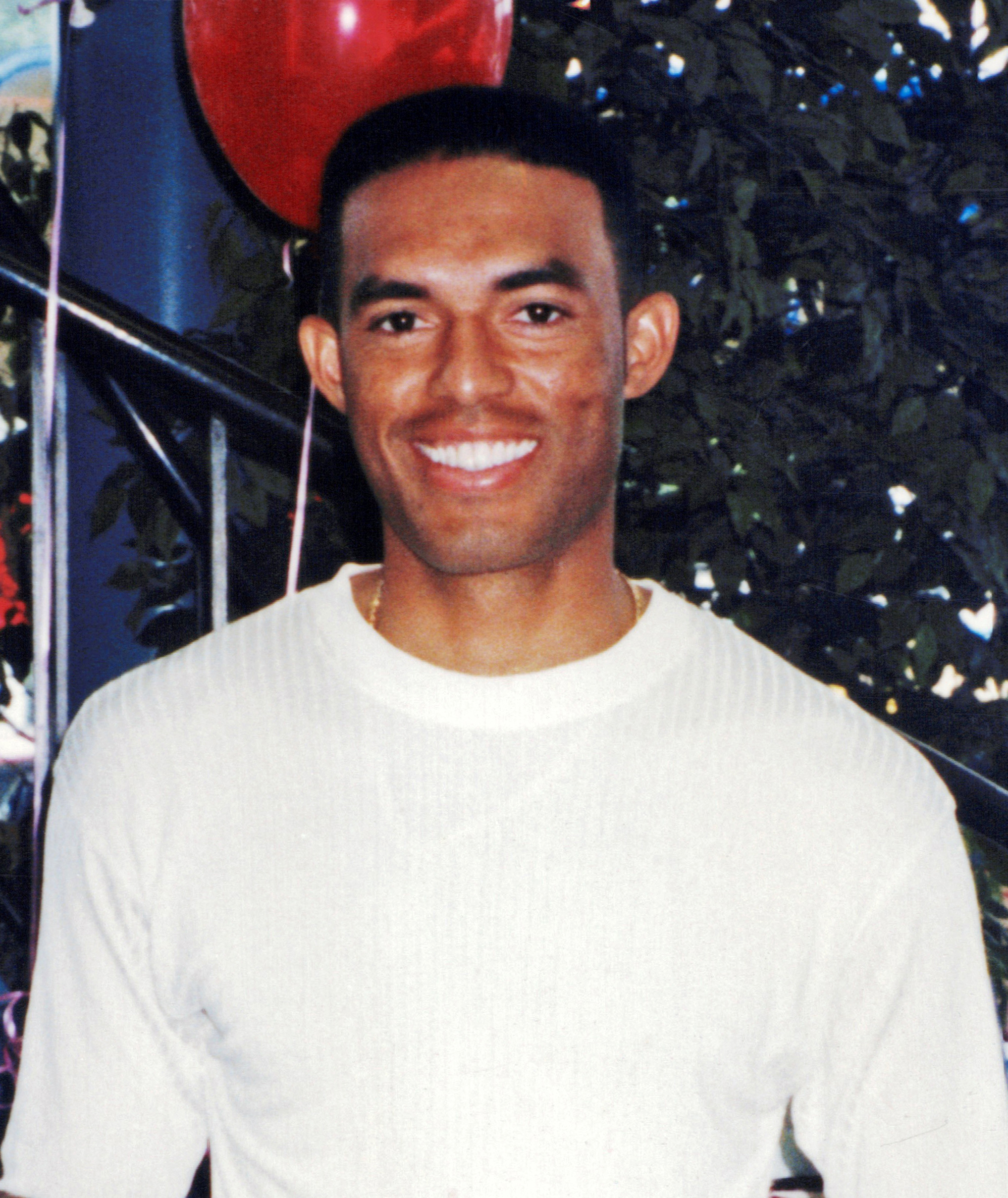
Rivera in 1997

Yankees management decided not to re-sign Wetteland in the offseason, opting instead to replace him with Rivera as the team's closer. In April 1997, MLB retired the uniform number 42 league-wide to honor the 50th anniversary of Jackie Robinson breaking the baseball color line, although Rivera was among 13 players allowed to keep the number per a grandfather clause. Rivera's transition from setup man to closer in 1997 was not seamless; he blew three of his first six save opportunities and indicated that he was initially uncomfortable in the role. With reassurance from manager Joe Torre, Rivera settled into the ninth-inning role, and he earned his first All-Star selection with 27 saves and a 1.96 ERA at the midseason break. In the 1997 All-Star Game, he pitched a perfect ninth inning to collect his first save in an All-Star Game. That summer, he added a cut fastball to his pitching repertoire after accidentally discovering how to throw the pitch. Rivera finished the regular season with 43 saves in 52 opportunities and a 1.88 ERA. His first year as closer ended with a blown save in Game 4 of the AL Division Series against the Cleveland Indians; with the Yankees four outs from advancing to the next round of the postseason, Rivera allowed a game-tying home run to Sandy Alomar Jr. The Yankees eventually lost the game as well as the next one, eliminating them from the postseason.

==== 1998–2001 ====
Rivera spent two weeks on the disabled list with a groin strain during the opening month of the 1998 season, but following his return, he continued to establish himself as one of the major leagues' best closers. Moreover, he became the central figure of a Yankees bullpen that, supported by middle relievers Jeff Nelson and Mike Stanton, contributed to the team's late-1990s dynasty. That year, Rivera made the cutter one of his primary pitches, and it quickly became his signature, earning a reputation for breaking hitters' bats with its sharp lateral movement. He saved 36 games in 41 opportunities and had a 1.91 ERA in the regular season. In the 1998 postseason, he pitched 13 1/3 scoreless innings and saved six games, three of which came in the 1998 World Series against the San Diego Padres. Rivera's save in Game 4 of the series clinched the Yankees' championship, capping off a season in which they won an MLB-record 125 games combined in the regular season and the postseason. By season's end, Rivera had allowed only two earned runs in 35 career postseason innings pitched—a 0.51 ERA—and by surpassing 30 innings pitched, he qualified for the major league record for lowest postseason career ERA; it is a record he still holds after 141 innings pitched.

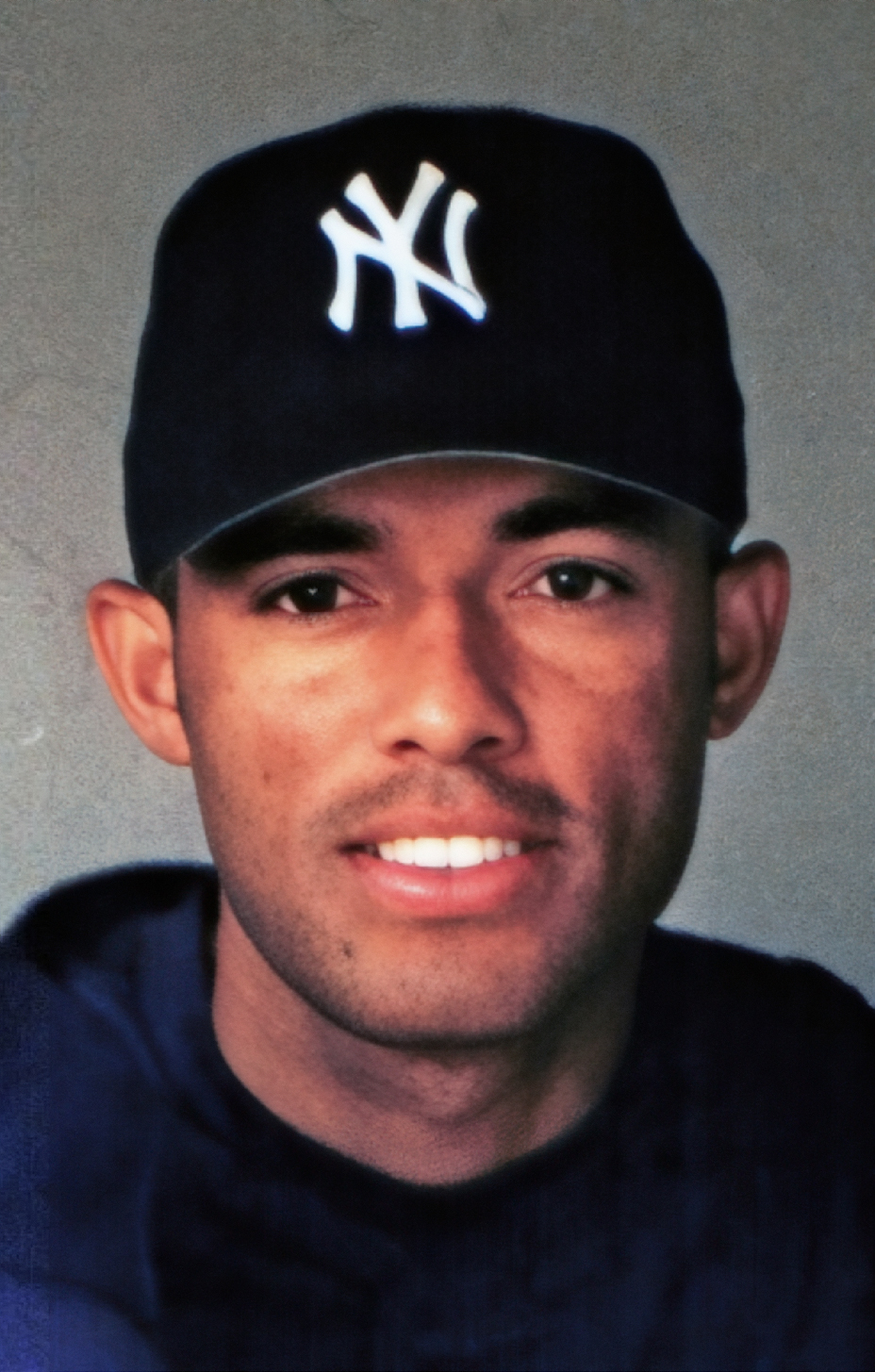
Rivera in September 1999

In his salary arbitration case during the offseason, Rivera was awarded a $4.25 million salary, a raise from the $750,000 he was previously earning. In 1999, Rivera was selected for the All-Star team for a second time with 23 saves and a 2.29 ERA in the first half of the season. That summer, the Yankee Stadium scoreboard production staff began playing the song "Enter Sandman" by heavy metal band Metallica as Rivera's entrance music. Staff members selected the song after witnessing in the previous year's World Series how enthusiastically San Diego fans reacted to closer Trevor Hoffman entering games accompanied by AC/DC's "Hells Bells". Although Rivera was indifferent to his entrance song and personally listened to Christian music, "Enter Sandman" soon became as much a part of his closer identity as his cutter. After recording three blown saves and a 7.84 ERA in July, he allowed just one earned run over his last 30 appearances. He ended the season with a 1.83 ERA and 45 saves in 49 opportunities, his first time leading the major leagues in saves. He received his first AL Rolaids Relief Man Award, which was given annually to the league's best closer based on their statistics. In the 1999 World Series against the Atlanta Braves, Rivera recorded a win and two saves, the second of which clinched the Yankees' championship title, his third overall. For his performance against Atlanta, he received the World Series MVP Award. Rivera finished 1999 by pitching 43 consecutive scoreless innings in the regular season and postseason combined, and he placed third in voting for the AL Cy Young Award. After the season, he said that he intended to play four more seasons before retiring to become a minister, though he backed off those plans the following year.

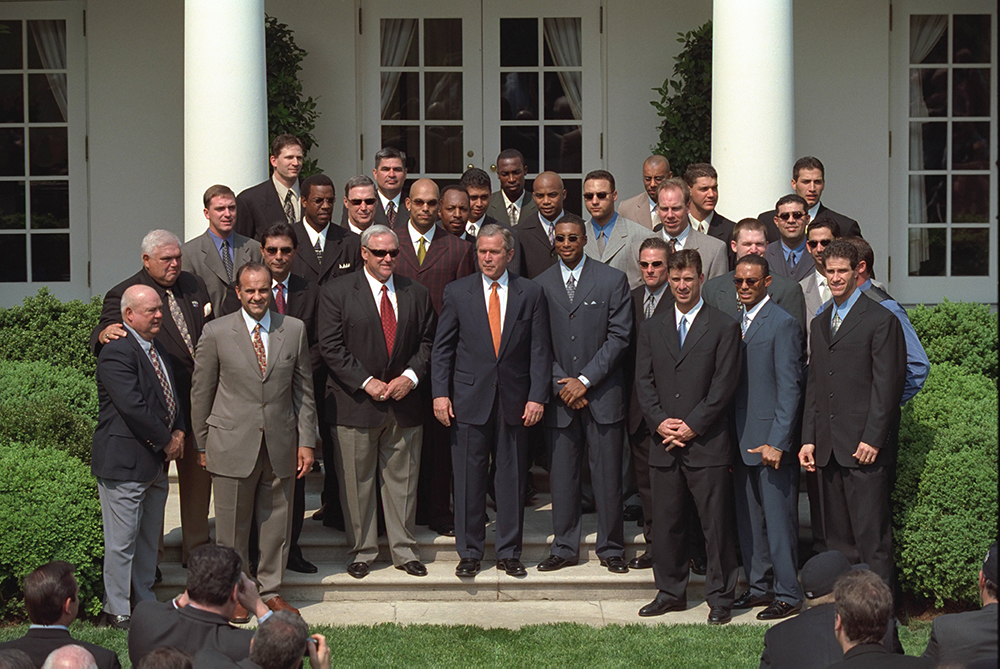
Rivera (front, second from right) and Yankee teammates from the 2000 World Series champion team pose with US President George W. Bush during a White House visit

In the offseason, Rivera was denied a $9.25 million salary in arbitration but was awarded $7.25 million per year instead, which was at the time the highest arbitration award in baseball history. In the 2000 season, Rivera was selected as an All-Star with 21 saves and a 2.95 ERA in the first half. On July 8, he saved both games of a day-night doubleheader against the New York Mets, one at Shea Stadium and the other at Yankee Stadium. He ended the season with 36 saves in 41 opportunities and a 2.85 ERA. In the postseason, Rivera saved six games, allowed three earned runs in 15 2/3 innings pitched, and broke two major league records: he eclipsed Dennis Eckersley's record for most postseason saves with the 16th of his career; he also broke Whitey Ford's record for most consecutive scoreless innings pitched in postseason play, a streak that ended shortly thereafter at 33 1/3 innings. In the 2000 World Series against the Mets, Rivera clinched a championship for the Yankees for the third consecutive year, his fourth championship overall. His save in the decisive Game 5 was the seventh World Series save of his career, setting a new record. By that point in his career, Rivera had established a reputation as an exceptional postseason performer—journalist Jack Curry called him the "infallible weapon" and "the greatest reason the Yankees [were] three-time champions".

With Rivera's contract set to expire after 2001, the Yankees signed him to a four-year, $39.99 million deal prior to the season, marking the first long-term contract of his career. In 2001, he was selected for the All-Star team for a third consecutive year. His final numbers included a 2.34 ERA, a closer career-high 80 2/3 innings pitched, and an MLB-leading 50 saves in 57 opportunities—his second time leading the league. His saves total that year broke the Yankees' single-season record (46) set by Dave Righetti in 1986, and it made him just the sixth MLB pitcher to reach 50 saves in a single season. For his performance, Rivera earned his second AL Rolaids Relief Man Award and finished eleventh in voting for the AL MVP Award. Despite having what sportswriters deemed an "aura of invincibility" in the postseason, Rivera failed to close out the decisive Game 7 of the 2001 World Series against the Arizona Diamondbacks. In one of his most infamous moments, he blew the save in the ninth inning, in part due to his own throwing error, and later lost the series for the Yankees by allowing a bloop single to Luis Gonzalez with the bases loaded to score the winning run. It was the first and only loss of Rivera's postseason career, and it snapped his record streak of 23 consecutive postseason saves converted.

==== 2002–2005 ====
On May 9, 2002, Rivera recorded his 225th career save, surpassing Dave Righetti as the Yankees' franchise leader in saves. Over the next few months of the season, injuries limited his playing time. He was first placed on the disabled list in June due to a groin strain, though his first-half numbers, which included a 1.47 ERA and 21 saves, earned him an All-Star selection. In a game on July 14, Rivera endured one of his worst outings, allowing six earned runs, including a walk-off grand slam. One week later, he was placed on the disabled list with a shoulder strain. Rivera was activated on August 8 after receiving a cortisone shot but returned to the disabled list after a recurrence of shoulder tightness. For the season, Rivera recorded a 2.74 ERA and 28 saves in 32 opportunities in just 46 innings pitched.

To placate the Yankees' concerns about his durability, Rivera followed a strength and conditioning program in the offseason, instead of throwing. Torre said that he intended to reduce Rivera's workload during the 2003 season to minimize injury risks, but Rivera suffered a groin injury before the season began, causing him to miss the first month. After returning on April 30, he pitched well in the season's first half, saving 16 games in 17 opportunities. His save on June 13 against the St. Louis Cardinals secured the 300th career win for starter Roger Clemens. Rivera slumped early in the second half; over one stretch, he blew five of eleven save opportunities, but he rebounded to convert his final 15 opportunities of the season. He finished the 2003 regular season with a new career best in ERA (1.66), along with 40 saves in 46 opportunities. In the AL Championship Series against the arch-rival Boston Red Sox, Rivera had one of the most memorable postseason performances of his career; in the decisive Game 7, he entered in the ninth inning with the score tied 5–5 and pitched three scoreless innings, his longest outing since 1996. He became the winning pitcher after Aaron Boone hit an eleventh-inning walk-off home run that clinched the Yankees' series victory and advanced them to the 2003 World Series. Rivera celebrated by running to the pitcher's mound and collapsing in joy to thank God, as Boone rounded the bases and was met by his teammates at home plate. Rivera was named the AL Championship Series MVP for recording two saves and a win in the series. The Yankees lost the World Series to the Florida Marlins; Rivera saved five games and allowed only one earned run in 16 innings pitched that postseason.

With a year remaining on his contract, Rivera signed a two-year extension in March 2004 worth $21 million, with an option for a third year. On May 28, he reached 300 career saves, making him the 18th player to do so. He was selected to his sixth All-Star team with a 0.99 ERA and an AL record-setting 32 saves at the midseason break. Rivera's final numbers for the year included a 1.94 ERA and a career-high 53 saves in 57 opportunities; it was his third time leading the major leagues in saves. Along with winning a third AL Rolaids Relief Man Award, he placed third in the AL Cy Young Award voting. Following the Yankees' victory in the AL Division Series against the Minnesota Twins, Rivera returned home to Panama to mourn two relatives who had died in an accident in his swimming pool. Despite his status being in doubt for the AL Championship Series against the Red Sox, he returned to New York for Game 1 after attending the funeral in Panama earlier in the day. He recorded a save that night, as well as in Game 2. Although the Yankees led three-games-to-none in the series, Rivera blew saves in Games 4 and 5, and the Red Sox won both games in extra innings to avoid elimination. In Game 4, Boston's Dave Roberts pinch ran and stole second base against Rivera, eventually scoring on a single to tie the game. In Game 5, Rivera entered with a one-run lead with runners on base and allowed a sacrifice fly to tie the score. Boston's comeback victories helped them become the first (and, as of 2025, the only) team in MLB history to win a best-of-seven series in which they trailed three-games-to-none. Although he allowed just one earned run in the 2004 postseason, he blew three of five save opportunities in the two series.

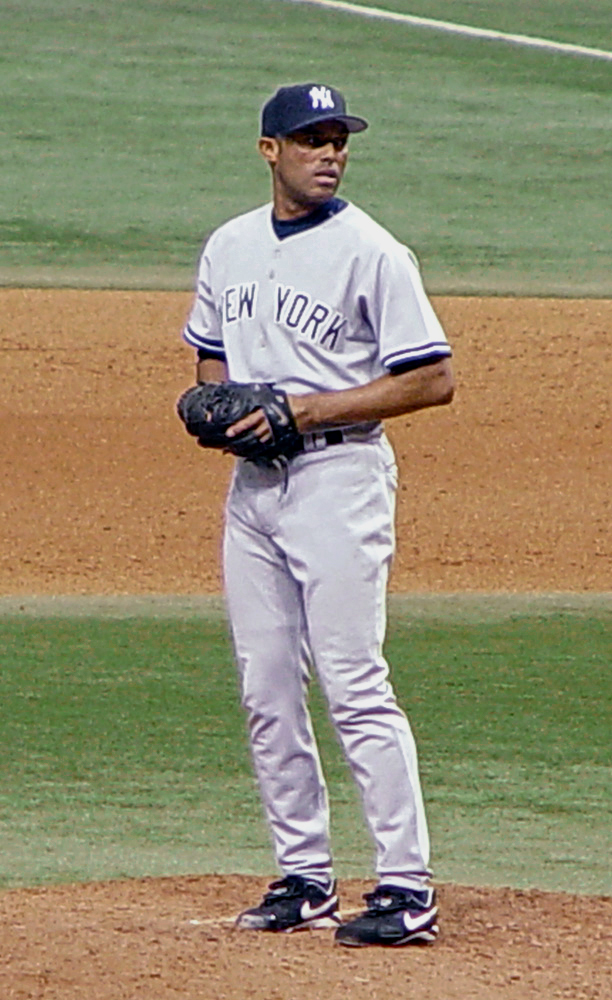
Rivera pitching in September 2005

Following a career high in appearances in 2004, Rivera did not throw during the offseason, unlike previous years. His 2005 season began on a low note. After missing time in spring training with elbow bursitis, he blew his first two save opportunities of the season against the Red Sox, marking four consecutive blown opportunities against Boston dating back to the previous postseason. Fans at Yankee Stadium booed Rivera, and baseball journalists speculated if his days as a dominant pitcher were over. He was subsequently cheered by Red Sox fans during pre-game introductions at Fenway Park the following week, in recognition of his struggles against the Red Sox. He responded to the ovation with a sense of humor by tipping his cap to the crowd.

Rivera rebounded in dominating fashion. He pitched 23 consecutive scoreless innings, set a new career high by converting 31 consecutive save opportunities, and was selected to the All-Star team. Over the course of the season, he passed Rollie Fingers, Randy Myers, and Jeff Reardon on MLB's all-time saves list, moving into fifth place. Rivera finished 2005 with 43 saves in 47 opportunities, and set new career bests in many statistical categories, including ERA (1.38) and walks plus hits per inning pitched, or WHIP (0.87). Rivera limited opposing hitters to a batting average against of .177, then the best mark of his closer career. In addition to winning a fourth AL Rolaids Relief Man Award, he was voted by fans as the inaugural winner of the Delivery Man of the Year Award. In the BBWAA's awards voting, Rivera placed second for the AL Cy Young Award behind starter Bartolo Colón, and ninth for the AL MVP Award—his best finishes for both awards. During the postseason, MLB announced the Latino Legends Team, an all-time roster of Latino players voted the greatest by fans; Rivera was named the team's relief pitcher.

==== 2006–2008 ====
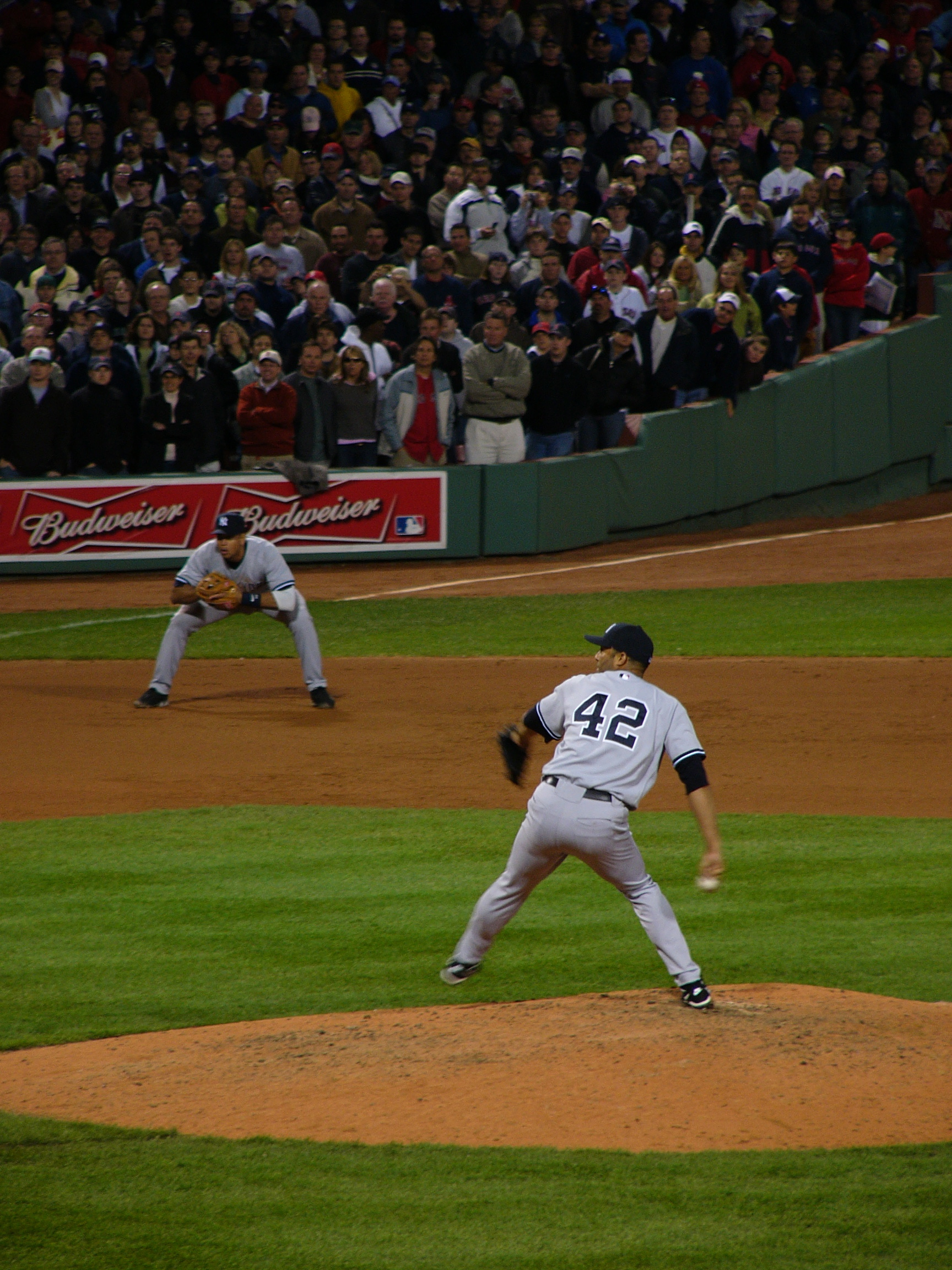
Rivera pitching on May 23, 2006

Rivera began 2006 with a 3.72 ERA and two losses in April, but his numbers improved in subsequent months. On June 6, he saved his 391st career game, passing Dennis Eckersley for the fourth-most saves in major league history. Rivera was selected to his third consecutive All-Star team with a 1.76 ERA and 19 saves entering the midseason break. He saved the AL's comeback victory in the All-Star Game for his third career All-Star save, tying Eckersley's record. On July 16, Rivera achieved another milestone by becoming the fourth MLB pitcher to reach 400 saves. In August, he guaranteed his $10.5 million contract option for 2007 by reaching 114 games finished over two years. Although a throwing elbow strain sidelined Rivera for most of September, he finished the 2006 season with 34 saves in 37 opportunities and an ERA of 1.80—his fourth consecutive season with a sub-2.00 ERA. For a second consecutive year, fans voted him the Delivery Man of the Year.

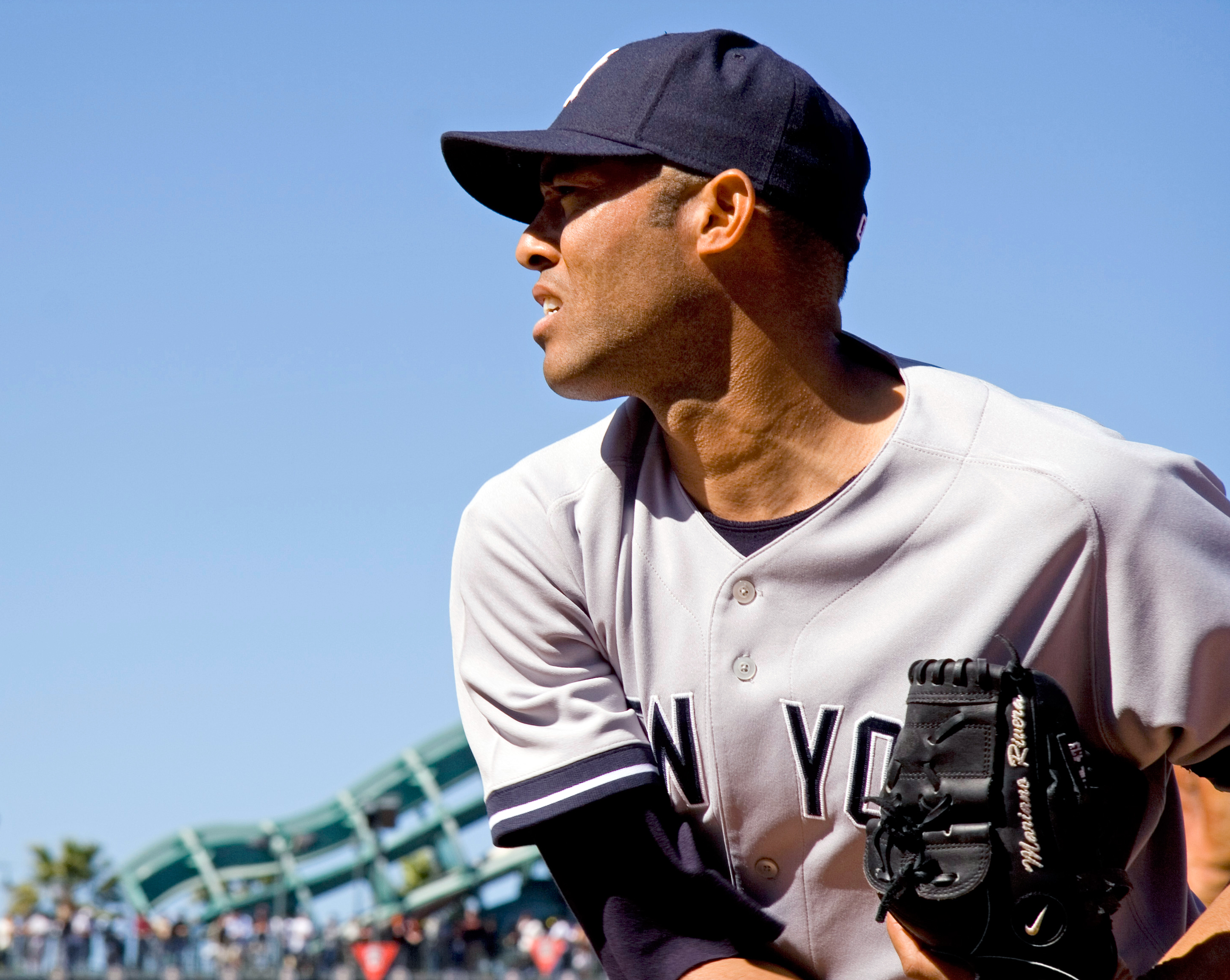
Rivera warming up in June 2007

With his contract set to expire after the 2007 season, Rivera sought an extension with the Yankees during spring training. Team management declined to negotiate near the start of the season, prompting him to respond that he would consider free agency at the end of the year. In April, Rivera blew his first two save opportunities, compiled two losses, and surrendered nine earned runs in 7 2/3 innings pitched. Concerned sportswriters attributed his struggles to infrequent use, as the Yankees presented him with few situations to enter a game. Rivera saved 30 of his next 32 opportunities and posted a 2.26 ERA over the final five months of the season. On July 14, he passed John Franco for third place on the all-time saves list with his 425th career save. Still, Rivera finished 2007 with closer career worsts in earned runs (25), hits (68), and ERA (3.15), and his 30 saves in 34 opportunities were his second-lowest total since 1997. After the Yankees were eliminated from the playoffs in the opening round, Rivera stated his intentions to test the free agent market. He initially indicated that his decision of where to sign would be influenced by whether long-time manager Joe Torre was re-signed. Although Torre did not return, Rivera remained with the Yankees by agreeing to a three-year, $45 million contract, making him the highest-paid reliever in baseball history.

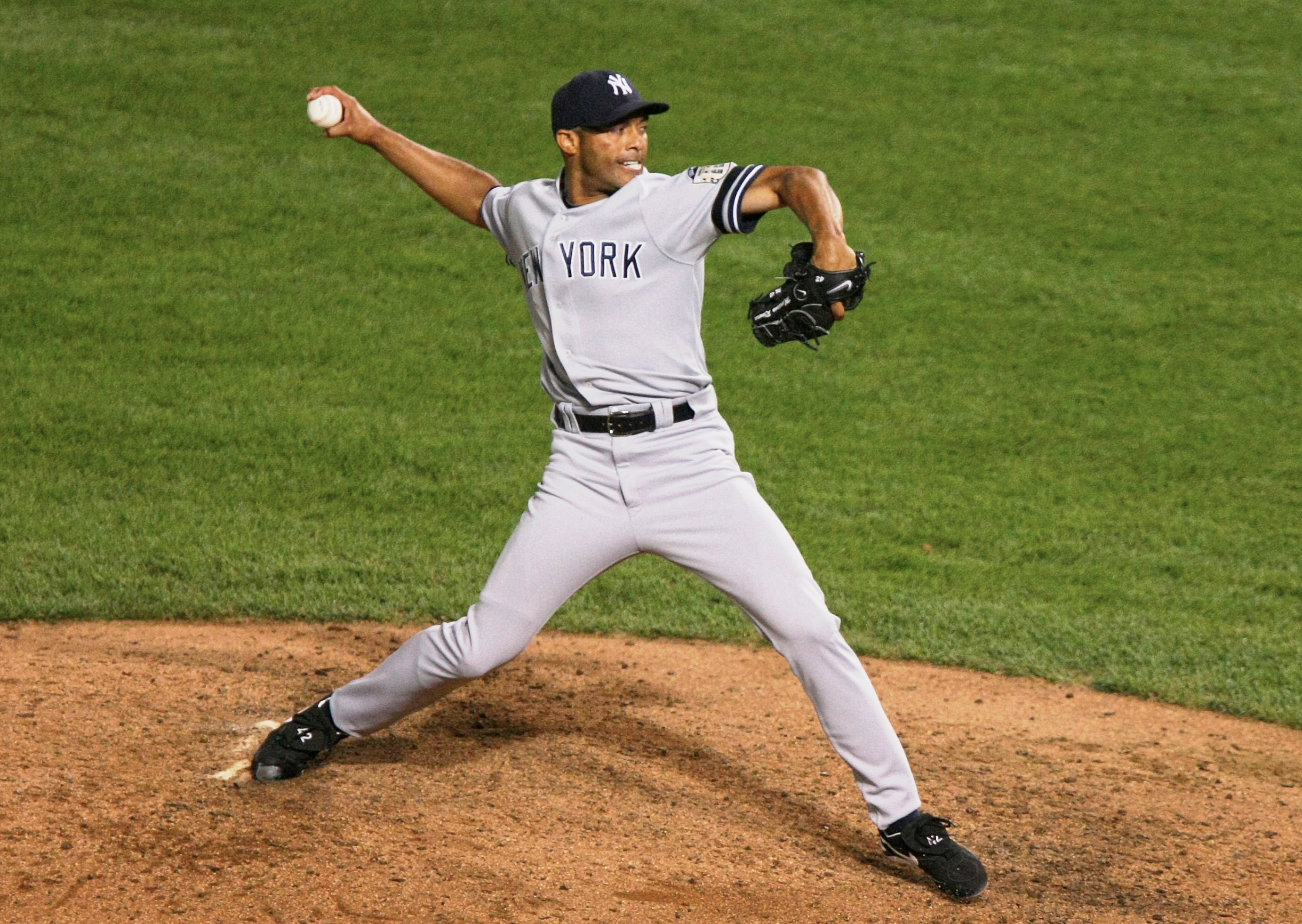
Rivera pitching in August 2008

Rivera rebounded in 2008 and began the year with 16 consecutive scoreless innings pitched and 28 consecutive save opportunities converted, both personal bests to start a season. His first-half performance, highlighted by a 1.06 ERA and 23 saves in as many opportunities, garnered him his ninth All-Star selection. Leading up to the 2008 MLB All-Star Game, which was held at Yankee Stadium in the venue's final year of existence, a few sportswriters proposed making Rivera the AL's starting pitcher as a tribute to him and his home ballpark. He instead was used as a reliever in the AL's extra-inning win. In the final month of the season, he recorded two milestones: on September 15, he recorded his 479th save to pass Lee Smith for second all-time in regular season saves; on September 21, in the final game at Yankee Stadium, Rivera threw the final pitch in the venue's history, retiring Brian Roberts of the Baltimore Orioles on a ground-out. After the Yankees missed the postseason for the first time in his career, Rivera disclosed that he had suffered from shoulder pain throughout the year. Tests revealed calcification of the acromioclavicular joint in his throwing shoulder, for which he underwent minor arthroscopic surgery in the offseason.

Rivera's 2008 season was one of his best individual years. Along with a 1.40 ERA and 39 saves in 40 opportunities, he set career bests in multiple statistical categories, including WHIP (0.67), on-base plus slugging (OPS)-against (.422), batting average against (.165), save percentage (97.5%), walks (6), earned runs (11), and blown saves (1). He averaged 9.81 strikeouts per 9 innings pitched, his best mark as a closer. He pitched with such control that his 12.83 strikeout-to-walk ratio made him the second MLB pitcher ever to record a figure that high in a season (minimum 50 innings pitched). He placed fifth in the AL Cy Young Award voting.

==== 2009–2012 ====
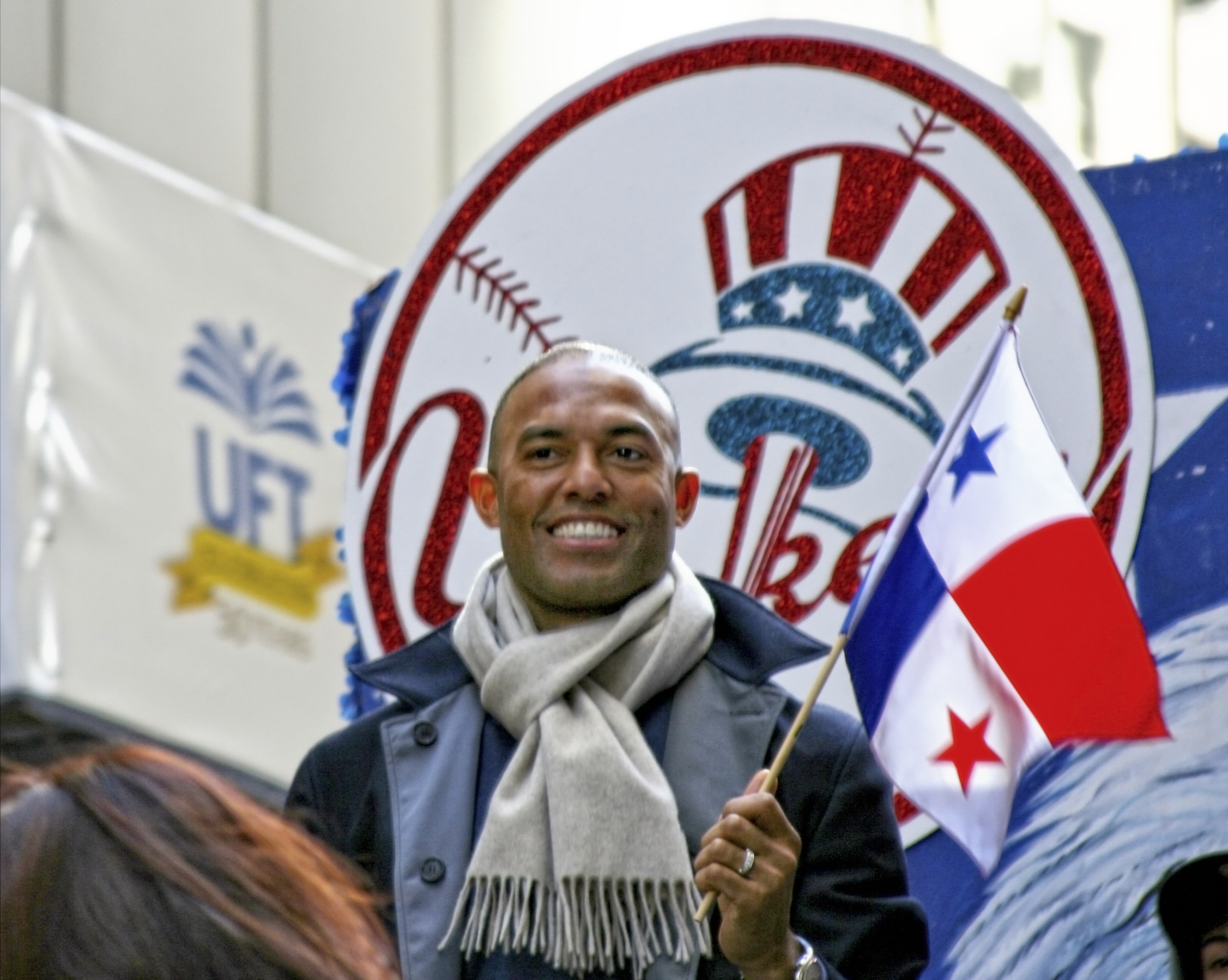
Rivera during the 2009 World Series victory parade, celebrating his fifth championship

In his first 12 appearances of 2009, Rivera surrendered four home runs and had a 3.97 ERA, leading to speculation about his cutter's effectiveness and his shoulder's health at age 39. As the season progressed, his numbers improved, and on June 28 he became the second pitcher to reach 500 regular season saves. In the same game, while batting against fellow closer Francisco Rodríguez, he collected his first career run batted in by walking with the bases loaded. With 23 saves in 24 opportunities and a 2.43 ERA in the season's first half, Rivera was named an All-Star for the tenth time. His save in the All-Star Game was his fourth career All-Star save, setting a new record. In the season's second half, Rivera allowed earned runs in only two of his final 40 appearances, while he set a new personal best for consecutive save opportunities converted with 36. He finished the regular season with a 1.76 ERA, 44 saves in 46 opportunities, and a 0.90 WHIP. In the postseason, he pitched 16 innings, allowing one earned run and saving five games, and he clinched the Yankees' victory in the 2009 World Series against the Philadelphia Phillies—his fifth championship. He was the only closer who did not record a loss or blown save that postseason. Rivera collected several awards at season's end, including his third Delivery Man of the Year Award, his fifth AL Rolaids Relief Man Award, and the 2009 Sporting News Pro Athlete of the Year Award. Reflecting on the decade's end, ESPN.com's Jerry Crasnick called Rivera the most valuable major league pitcher of the previous 10 years.

In 2010, Rivera and two of his "Core Four" teammates, Derek Jeter and Jorge Posada, became the first trio in any of the four major sports leagues in North America (MLB, NFL, NBA, or NHL) to play together on the same team for 16 consecutive seasons. In May, Rivera blew a save to snap a personal streak of 51 consecutive save opportunities converted at home, tying him with Éric Gagné for the MLB record at the time. Rivera had one of his best first halves, compiling a 1.05 ERA, 20 saves in 22 opportunities, and 0.64 WHIP before the All-Star break, and in June, he set a personal best streak with 24 consecutive batters retired. He earned an 11th All-Star selection but withdrew from the game due to lingering oblique and knee injuries. In the second half, he was less effective—he struck out batters half as often, and in September, he compiled three blown saves and a 4.76 ERA. Rivera ended 2010 with a 1.80 ERA and 0.83 WHIP, numbers that were among his career bests, though his 33 saves in 38 opportunities and 6.75 strikeouts per 9 innings ratio were below his career averages. In the postseason, he pitched 6 1/3 scoreless innings while saving three games. After becoming a free agent in the offseason, he agreed to a two-year, $30 million contract to remain with the Yankees.

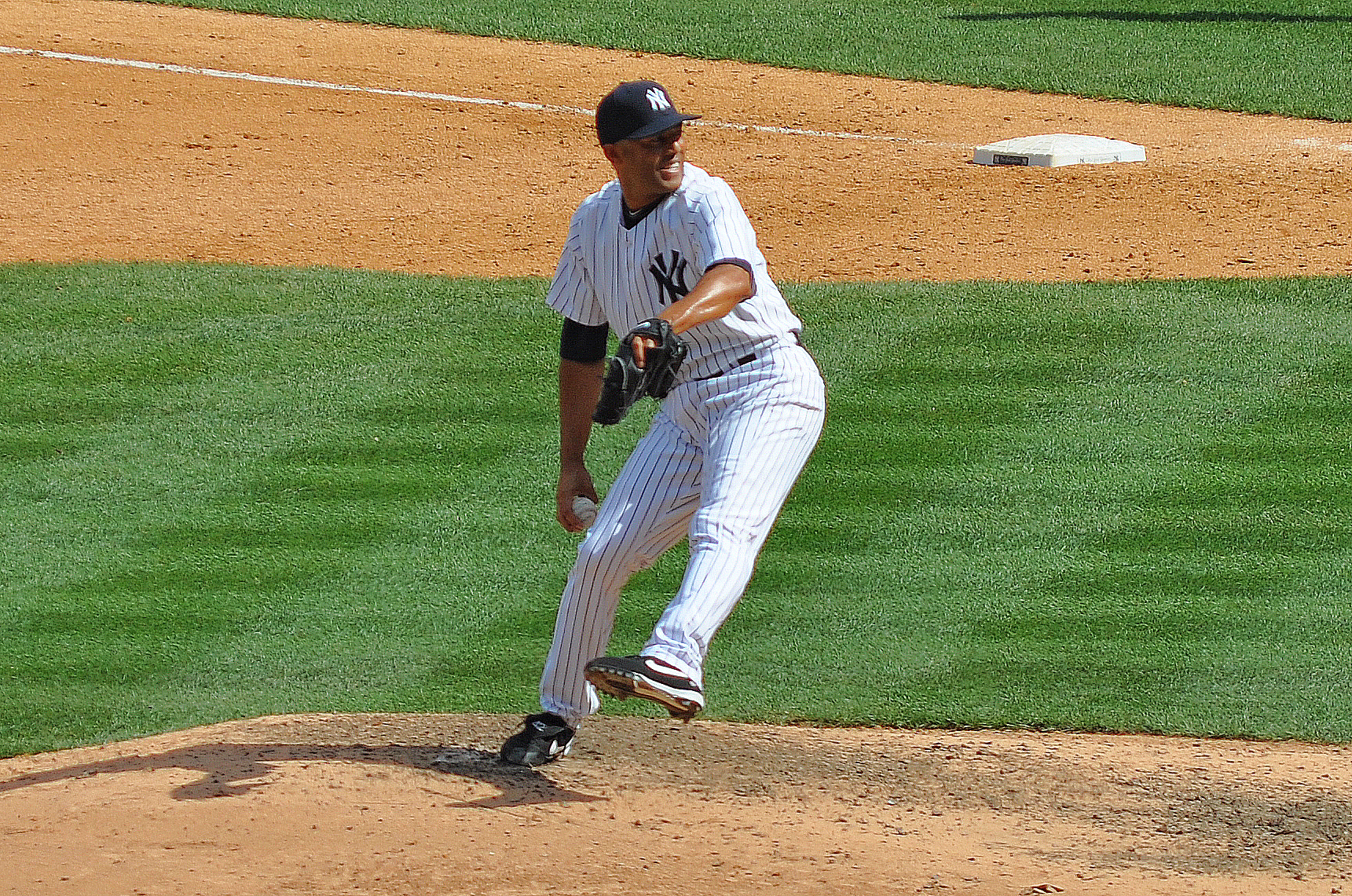
Rivera pitching against the Baltimore Orioles on July 31, 2011

That same offseason, Trevor Hoffman retired as the all-time regular season saves leader with a final tally of 601, leaving Rivera as the active leader in saves and 42 behind Hoffman's record to start 2011. Rivera's season was marked by several milestones. He broke the all-time record for games finished, and in May, he became the 15th pitcher to make 1,000 appearances and the first to do so with a single team. He was named an All-Star for the 12th time with a 1.85 ERA and 22 saves in 26 opportunities at the midseason break, but for the second consecutive year, he skipped the game to rest injuries. His pursuit of the saves record reached a climax in the final month of the season. On September 13, he collected his 600th save, making him just the second pitcher to accomplish the feat. Four days later, he saved his 601st game, tying him with Hoffman for the most in MLB history. Rivera broke the record on September 19 at Yankee Stadium by closing out a 6–4 win against the Twins, the final out a strikeout of Chris Parmelee. After the game, Panamanian President Ricardo Martinelli called him to offer his congratulations. Rivera finished the season with a 1.91 ERA, a 0.90 WHIP, and 44 saves in 49 opportunities, making him the first pitcher over the age of 40 to save at least 40 games in a season. In the offseason, he underwent throat surgery to remove polyps from his vocal cords.

Rivera began the 2012 season by blowing a save on Opening Day but followed it with eight scoreless innings and five saves for the remainder of April. After just nine appearances, his season was prematurely ended by a freak injury; prior to a May 3 game against the Kansas City Royals, Rivera was shagging balls during batting practice but his right knee buckled on the field's warning track, causing him to tear his right anterior cruciate ligament (ACL). Speculation grew that the injury would end his career, as he had hinted at retirement during spring training. Rivera put those concerns to rest the following day when he announced his intentions to return, saying: "Write it down in big letters. I'm not going down like this." He successfully underwent ACL reconstructive surgery on June 12, while his meniscus, previously thought to have been damaged, did not need to be repaired. Rafael Soriano filled in as closer in Rivera's absence and saved 42 games in 46 opportunities. Rivera signed a one-year, $10 million contract in the offseason to remain with the team.

==== 2013 ====
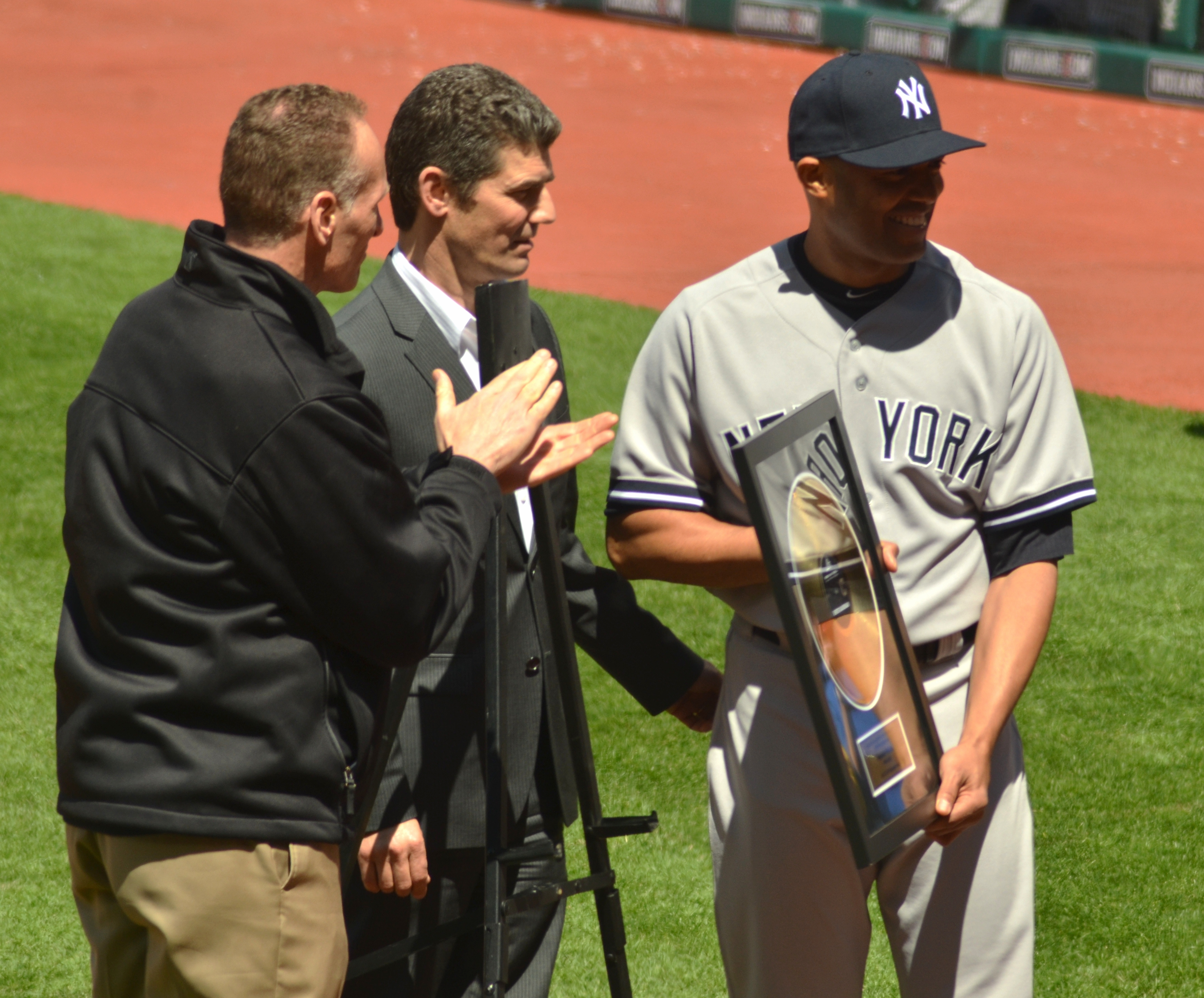
Rivera receiving a gold record of "Enter Sandman" from the Cleveland Indians during his final season

After successfully rehabilitating his knee in the offseason, the 43-year-old Rivera announced on March 9, 2013, that he would retire after the 2013 season, his 19th in the major leagues. Throughout his final year, Rivera spent time during visits to each ballpark meeting privately with fans and unsung team employees to hear their stories and thank them for supporting baseball. He explained: "It was important for me to meet the people who make baseball what it is, the people who work in the game every day. They have given me far more than I have given them." Each opposing team returned the favor by honoring Rivera with a gift during his final visit to their city. In Cleveland, the Indians teamed up with the Rock and Roll Hall of Fame to present Rivera with a gold record of his entrance song "Enter Sandman". The Minnesota Twins commissioned a rocking chair made of broken bats, many broken personally by Rivera's cutter, called the "Chair of Broken Dreams". The rival Boston Red Sox gave him a painting and several artifacts from Fenway Park. Many teams made donations to the Mariano Rivera Foundation, the pitcher's charitable organization. Corporate sponsors of the Yankees paid tribute as well. Delta Air Lines dedicated a Boeing 757 airplane with Rivera's signature and uniform number 42 on the exterior, while Hard Rock Cafe retired "Enter Sandman" from its song system at all locations except for its Yankee Stadium restaurant.

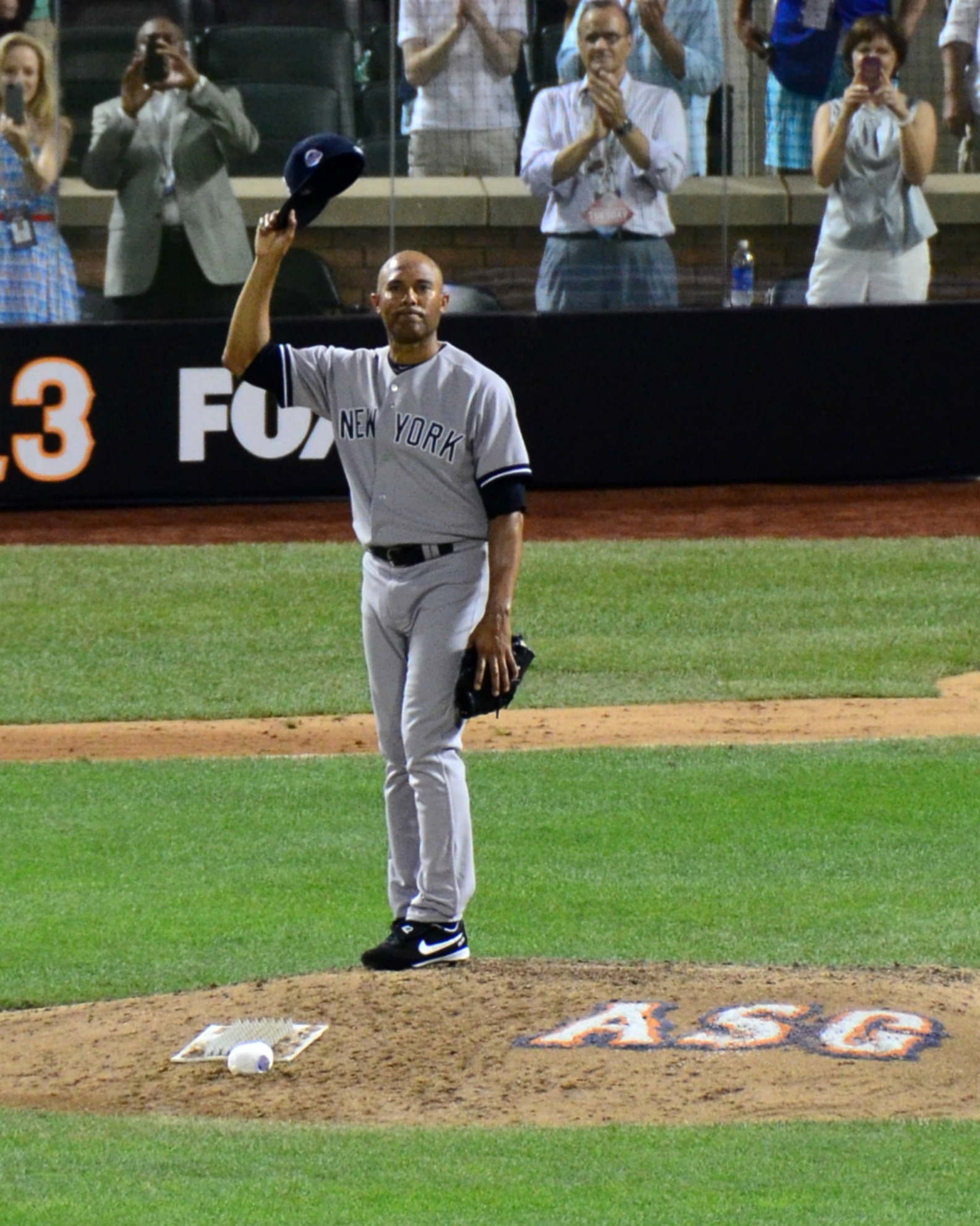
Rivera acknowledges an ovation from fans and players at the 2013 All-Star Game in his final All-Star appearance. His former manager Joe Torre is visible in the crowd (second from right).

Rivera's 10 saves in 10 opportunities in April were his highest total for the opening month of a season. He converted his first 18 save attempts of the season until blowing a save against the Mets on May 28; it was the first time that he blew a save and lost a game without recording an out. Rivera entered the midseason break with 30 saves in 32 opportunities and a 1.83 ERA, and he was named an All-Star for the 13th time in his career, the second-most All-Star selections for a pitcher behind Warren Spahn's 17. During the All-Star Game, held at Citi Field in New York, Rivera was called upon to pitch in the eighth inning for his final All-Star appearance. As he trotted onto the field, players from both teams remained near their dugouts and joined fans in giving Rivera a standing ovation as he stood alone on the field. Rivera retired all three batters he faced, preserving his 0.00 career ERA in All-Star Games. He was named the All-Star Game MVP, making him the first reliever selected to an All-Star team to ever receive the award, as well as the first pitcher since Pedro Martínez in 1999 and the second Yankee ever after Derek Jeter in 2000. He became the first MLB player to be named the MVP of a World Series, League Championship Series, and All-Star Game. Rivera's performance dipped in the second half of the season, as he blew five save opportunities in the last two months, including three consecutive chances for the first time in his career. In a Fox Sports documentary chronicling his final year entitled Being: Mariano, Rivera said that the season-long process of bidding farewell to baseball had mentally and physically drained him and that by September, he had "no desire" left for the sport.

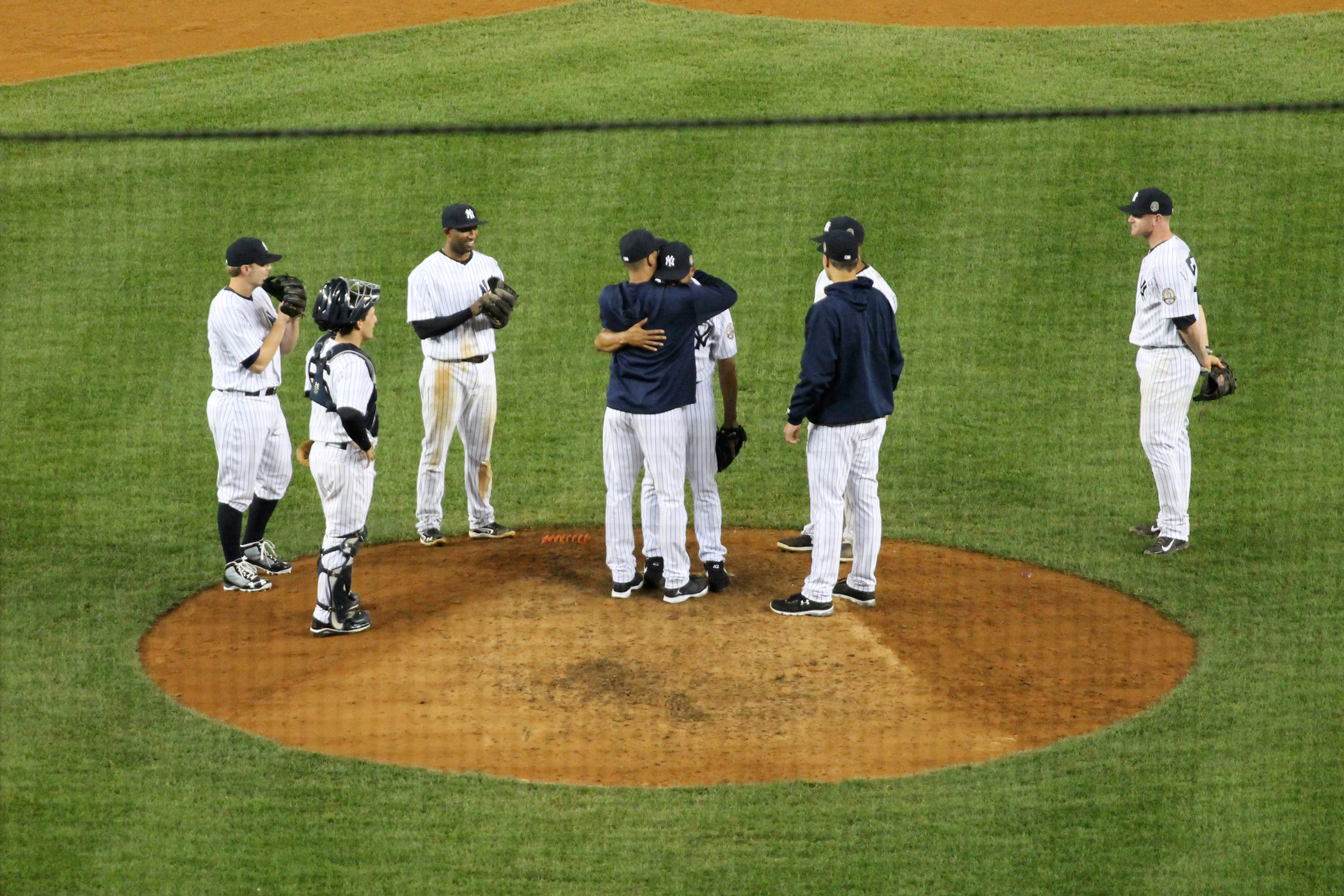
Rivera hugs teammates before leaving his final MLB game on September 26, 2013

On September 22, 2013, a day that Mayor of New York City Michael Bloomberg declared "Mariano Rivera Day", the Yankees held a 50-minute pre-game tribute to Rivera at Yankee Stadium. In a ceremony attended by former teammates, Yankees staff, and members of Jackie Robinson's family, Rivera's uniform number 42 was retired by the team, making him the first active Yankee to receive that honor. Metallica performed "Enter Sandman" live as he walked onto the field during the festivities. The team presented a video montage and several gifts to Rivera before he addressed the crowd to offer his thanks. Four days later against the Tampa Bay Rays, he pitched in the final game of his career before a home crowd at Yankee Stadium. Entering in the eighth inning to a pre-recorded introduction by late Yankees public address announcer Bob Sheppard, Rivera pitched 1 1/3 innings without allowing a baserunner. In the ninth inning, after retiring Yunel Escobar on a pop fly for the second out, Rivera was removed from the game; with permission from the umpires, Yankees manager Joe Girardi ceremonially delegated the substitution duty to Rivera's long-time teammates Andy Pettitte and Derek Jeter. After they reached the mound to make the pitching change, the normally reserved Rivera tearfully embraced his teammates for nearly a minute. Walking off the field to a standing ovation from fans and players, he saluted the crowd and then took a curtain call. After the game, he visited the mound for a final time and grabbed a handful of dirt as a memento. Rivera finished his final season with a 2.11 ERA, 1.05 WHIP, and 44 saves in 51 opportunities, earning him the AL Comeback Player of the Year Award, among several awards. During the World Series, he was honored as the 13th recipient of the Commissioner's Historic Achievement Award for his accomplished career and for being "a great ambassador of the game".

== Player profile ==
=== Pitching style ===
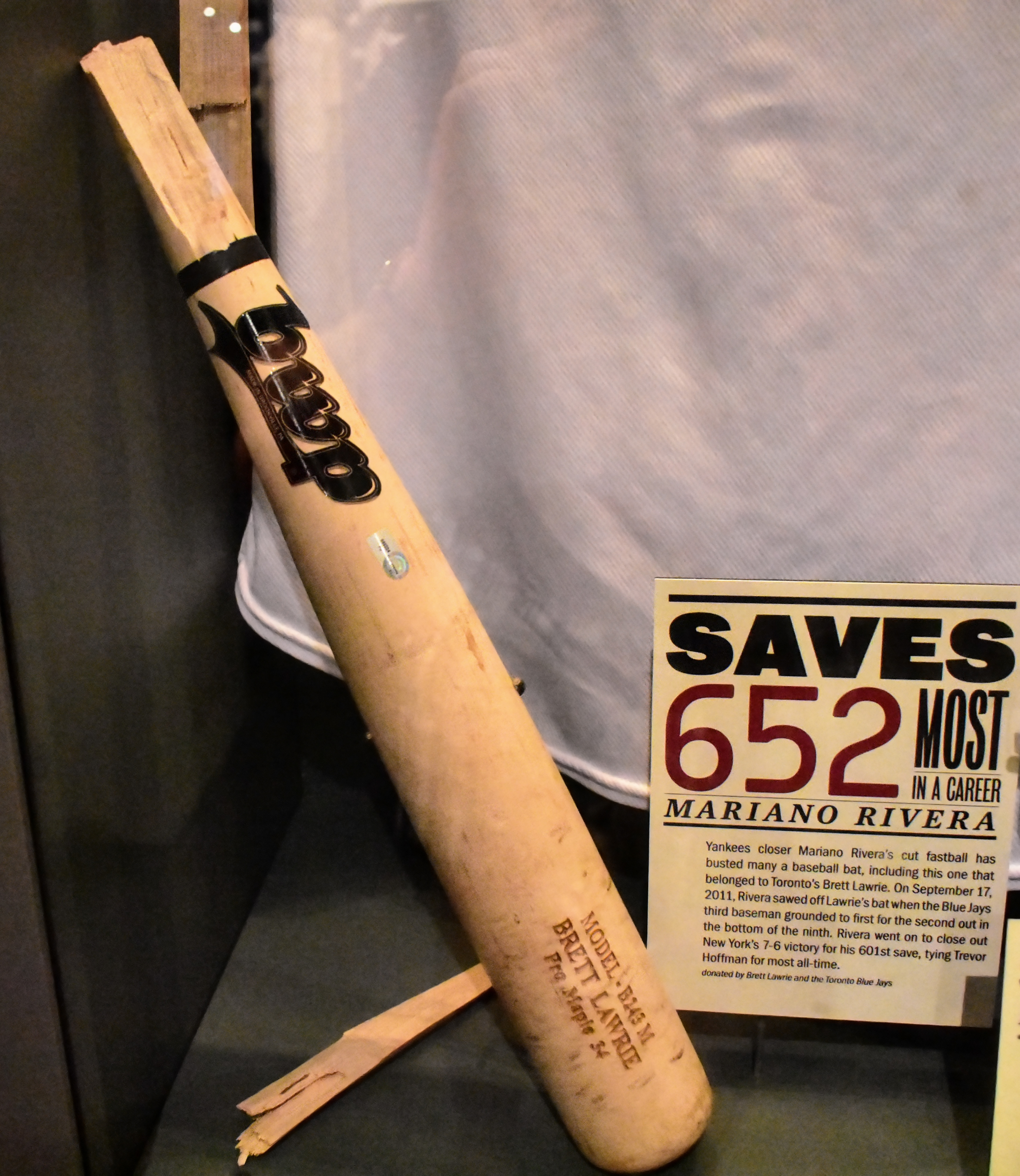
A bat broken by Rivera's cutter during his record-tying 601st career save, on display in the National Baseball Hall of Fame and Museum

Rivera's signature pitch was a cut fastball or "cutter", which exhibited lateral movement towards left-handed hitters similar to that of a slider but with the velocity of a fastball. The sharp, late movement of Rivera's cutter prevented hitters from making contact with the ball on the sweet spot of their bats, leading to them not only making weak contact on batted balls but also frequently breaking their bats. According to a tally by columnist Buster Olney, Rivera broke 44 bats during the 2001 regular season. Chipper Jones, who once witnessed teammate Ryan Klesko break three bats in a plate appearance against Rivera in the 1999 World Series, called the pitch a "buzz saw". Rivera's long fingers and loose wrist allowed him to impart more spin on the ball, contributing to the pitch's movement. Describing his grip of the cutter, he said, "it's really a four-seam fastball with pressure on the middle finger". By adjusting the pressure that he applied to the ball with his fingertips, he could vary the pitch's movement. One of the keys to his cutter grip was bending his thumb at the knuckle and tucking it under the ball so the nail aligned with his middle finger; this position prevented his thumb pad from impeding the spin of the ball as it left his hand. Rivera threw four-seam and two-seam fastballs as complementary pitches but primarily used his cutter; according to baseball statistics website Fangraphs, Rivera threw at least 82% cutters each season from 2008 to 2013. All three pitches typically reached a velocity in the low-to-mid 90s mph.

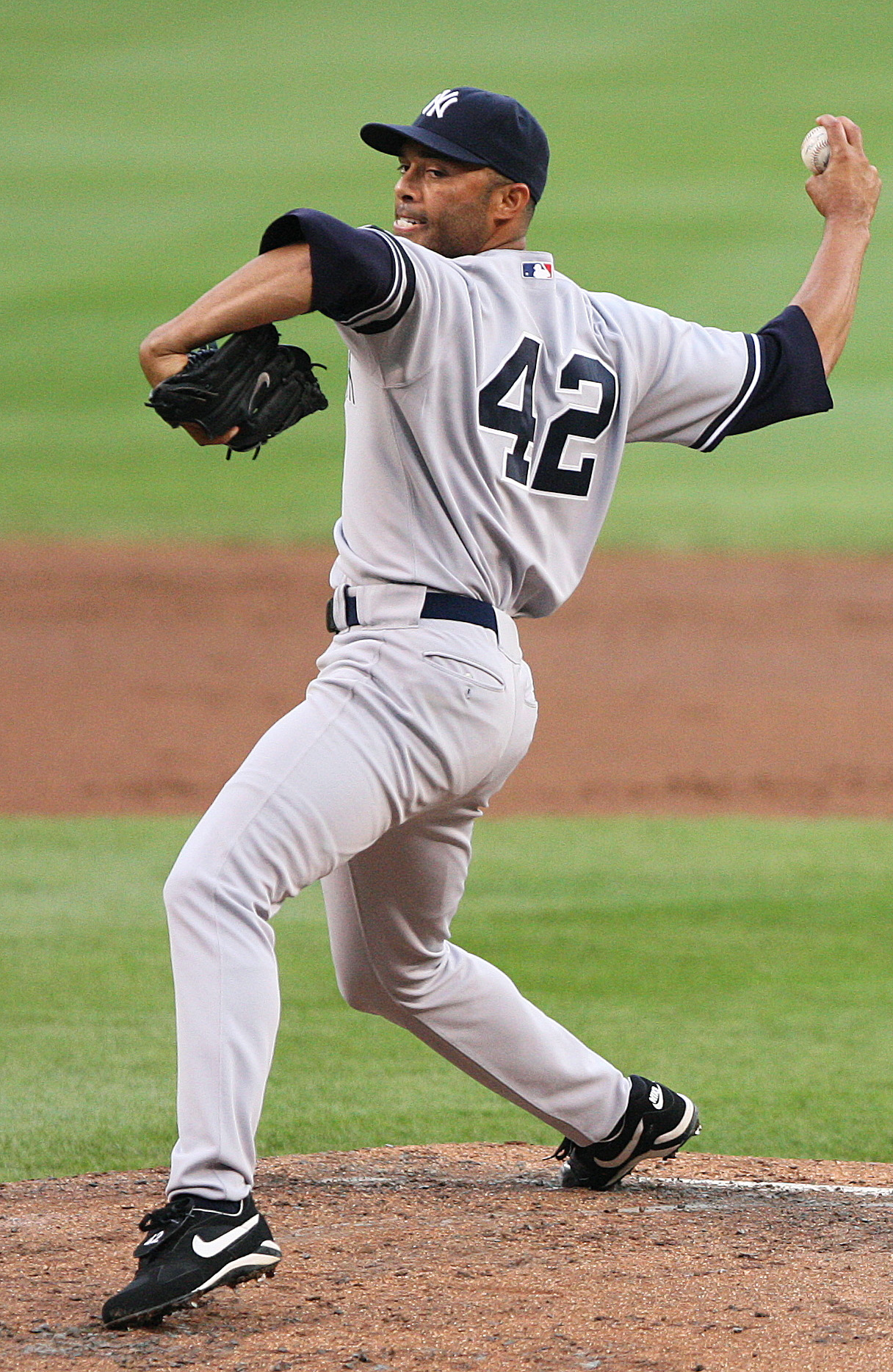
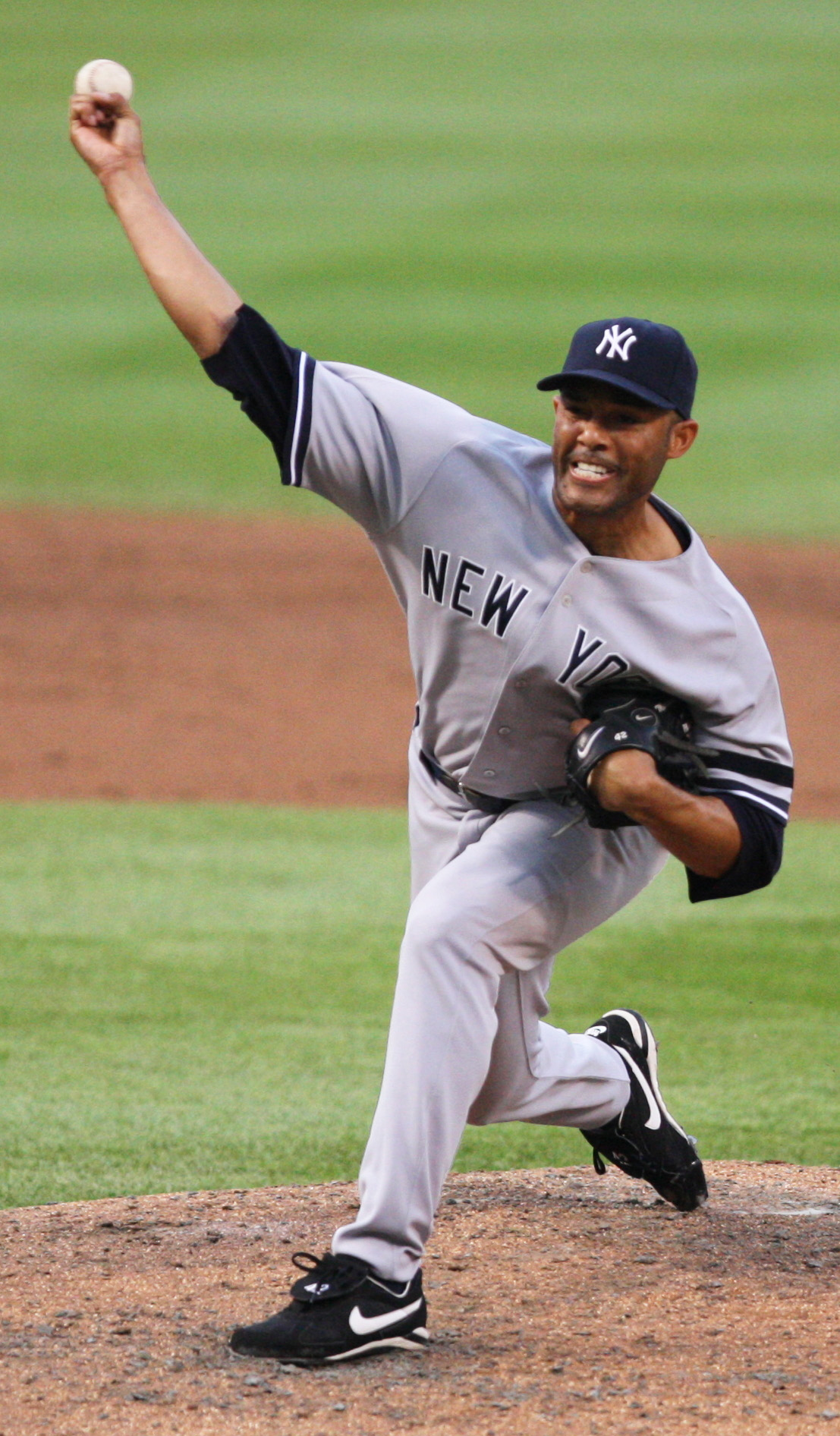
Rivera throws a cut fastball in 2007

Early in his major league career, Rivera was a "power pitcher" who relied on an overpowering four-seam fastball that topped out at 96 mph (154 km/h) to retire hitters. By enticing them to swing and miss at pitches high in the strike zone, he accumulated strikeouts at a high rate. Rivera altered his pitching style after accidentally discovering the cutter. One day in June 1997 during one of his daily warm-up tosses with teammate Ramiro Mendoza, Rivera noticed that his fastballs were moving sharply and unpredictably, a problem that began to occur in games as well. After unsuccessfully spending a month trying to eliminate the movement, Rivera relented and incorporated the cutter into his pitching repertoire, making it one of his primary pitches in 1998. When asked about the pitch's origin, he explained: "It was just from God. I didn't do anything. It was natural." As he came to rely on the cutter, Rivera began to record more outs on batted balls. This change resulted in his strikeouts per 9 innings rate decreasing from 10.87 in 1996 to 5.3 in 1998, but it also decreased his pitches per inning rate from 18.7 in 1995 to 14.9 in 1998. Rivera credited his improved efficiency and consequent longevity in baseball to his long-time pitching coach Mel Stottlemyre.

Rivera had an impeccable ability to accurately locate pitches and consistently throw strikes, particularly on the inside and outside edges of the strike zone. This strength offset his reliance on one pitch and hitters' anticipation of it. His former catcher Joe Girardi said: "He was so easy to catch because he always put the ball right there. I don't think there's ever been a pitcher that great who was so easy to catch." Rivera's 4.10 career strikeout-to-walk ratio in the regular season ranks 16th-best in MLB history. His control was a byproduct of his smooth, easily repeated pitching motion, one that Darrin Fletcher found deceptive as an opposing hitter. He said in 1999 that Rivera "almost kind of lulls you to sleep with his delivery. It gives you a false sense of security, and then the ball is on you and it's exploding."

"You know what's coming, but you know what's coming in horror movies too. It still gets you."

— Mike Sweeney, on the difficulty of hitting Rivera's cutter despite expecting it

Defying conventional wisdom of lefty-righty matchups, switch hitters occasionally batted right-handed when facing the right-handed Rivera, believing that his cutter would jam a batter hitting left-handed. Similarly, some managers, such as Bruce Bochy in the 1998 World Series, sent right-handed batters to pinch hit for left-handers against Rivera, thinking that the cutter would be more difficult for lefties to hit. Opposing hitters occasionally chose to face Rivera with backup or batting practice bats, rather than risk breaking their best ones against his cutter.

Rivera was considered an exceptional athlete, distinguished by his slender physique and durability. His propensity to shag balls during batting practice convinced scouts he could be a top AL center fielder. Olney compared Rivera's regimen of physical preparation and guidelines for staying healthy to Satchel Paige's "Rules for Staying Young". Former teammate Alex Rodriguez expressed amazement at Rivera's athleticism and claimed that the pitcher completed a 35-inch (890 mm) vertical jump in Yankees training camp at age 41.

=== Personality ===
Rivera exhibited a reserved demeanor on the field that contrasted with the emotional, demonstrative temperament of many of his peers. Hall of Fame closer Goose Gossage said that Rivera's composure under stress gave him the appearance of having "ice water in his veins". Commenting on his ability to remain focused in pressure situations, Rivera said, "When you start thinking, a lot of things will happen... If you don't control your emotions, your emotions will control your acts, and that's not good." His ability to compartmentalize his successes and failures impressed fellow reliever Joba Chamberlain, who said, "He's won and lost some of the biggest games in the history of baseball, and he's no worse for the wear when he gives up a home run." Rivera explained the need to quickly forget bad performances, saying, "the game that you're going to play tomorrow is not going to be the same game that you just played." Derek Jeter called him the "most mentally tough" teammate with whom he had ever played.

During his playing career, Rivera was regarded as a team leader within the Yankees organization, often mentoring younger pitchers and counseling teammates. He had a team-first mindset and deferred most discussions about individual accolades to team goals and his teammates, praising them for making his presence in games possible. When asked to describe his job, Rivera once put it simply, "I get the ball, I throw the ball, and then I take a shower."

== Legacy ==
"When you go back and look at his career and what he's done with that one pitch, I don't think there's a greater achievement in this game than that. To go through major league hitters and dominate for all those years, it's one of the greatest feats I'll ever look back on... I don't think people realize how incredible it really is. It will never be duplicated, ever."

— Eric Chavez

Rivera was a dominant reliever throughout his career, pitching with a consistency and longevity uncharacteristic of a role commonly marked by volatility and high turnover. In his 17-year tenure as the Yankees' closer, Rivera compiled considerable career numbers. A 13-time All-Star, he is MLB's all-time regular season leader in saves (652) and games finished (952). He pitched in 1,115 regular season games, which is fourth-most in MLB history, the most in AL history, and the most by a right-handed pitcher. Rivera holds or shares several records for the most seasons of reaching various save milestones, including seasons with at least: 20 saves (sixteen); 25 saves (fifteen consecutive, sixteen total); 30 saves (nine consecutive, fifteen total); 35 saves (twelve); 40 saves (nine); and 50 saves (two). At the time of his retirement, Rivera's career ERA (2.21) and WHIP (1.00) were the lowest of any MLB pitcher in the live-ball era (minimum 1,000 innings pitched), making him one of the top pitchers since 1920 at preventing hitters from reaching base and scoring. He recorded an ERA under 2.00 in 11 seasons, tying him with Walter Johnson for the most such seasons (minimum 60 innings pitched each). Rivera also ranks first in career adjusted ERA+ (205), a statistic that adjusts ERA for league and ballpark to allow comparisons of pitchers on the same baseline. His 1,135 regular season strikeouts rank 13th all time among relievers.

In addition to his strong regular season numbers, Rivera excelled in the postseason, recording an 8–1 win–loss record and a 0.76 WHIP. He holds numerous postseason records, including lowest career ERA among players with a minimum of 30 innings pitched (0.70), most saves (42), most consecutive scoreless innings pitched (33 1/3), most consecutive save opportunities converted (23), and most games pitched (96). He saved more than twice as many postseason games as any other pitcher; Kenley Jansen, with 20, has the next-highest total. In an oft-cited statistic, more people have walked on the Moon (12) than have scored an earned run against Rivera in the postseason (11). Joe Torre, who was the Yankees' manager for most of Rivera's career, said: "Let's face it. The regular season for Mo is great, but that's the cupcakes and the ice cream. What separates him from everybody else is what he's done in the postseason." Rivera's dominance in the postseason often led to him being utilized for two-inning appearances, as he saved a record 14 postseason games in this manner—more than all other MLB relievers combined while he was an active player. He ranks first all time in win probability added (WPA) in the postseason with 11.7, nearly three times the total of the next-closest player. He also ranks first all time in championship WPA in the postseason (183, or 1.83), meaning his performance alone added nearly two World Series championships to the Yankees. In a 2009 ESPN.com poll, Rivera was voted one of the top five postseason players in MLB history. Neil Greenberg of The Washington Post ranked him the most "clutch" player in MLB postseason history.

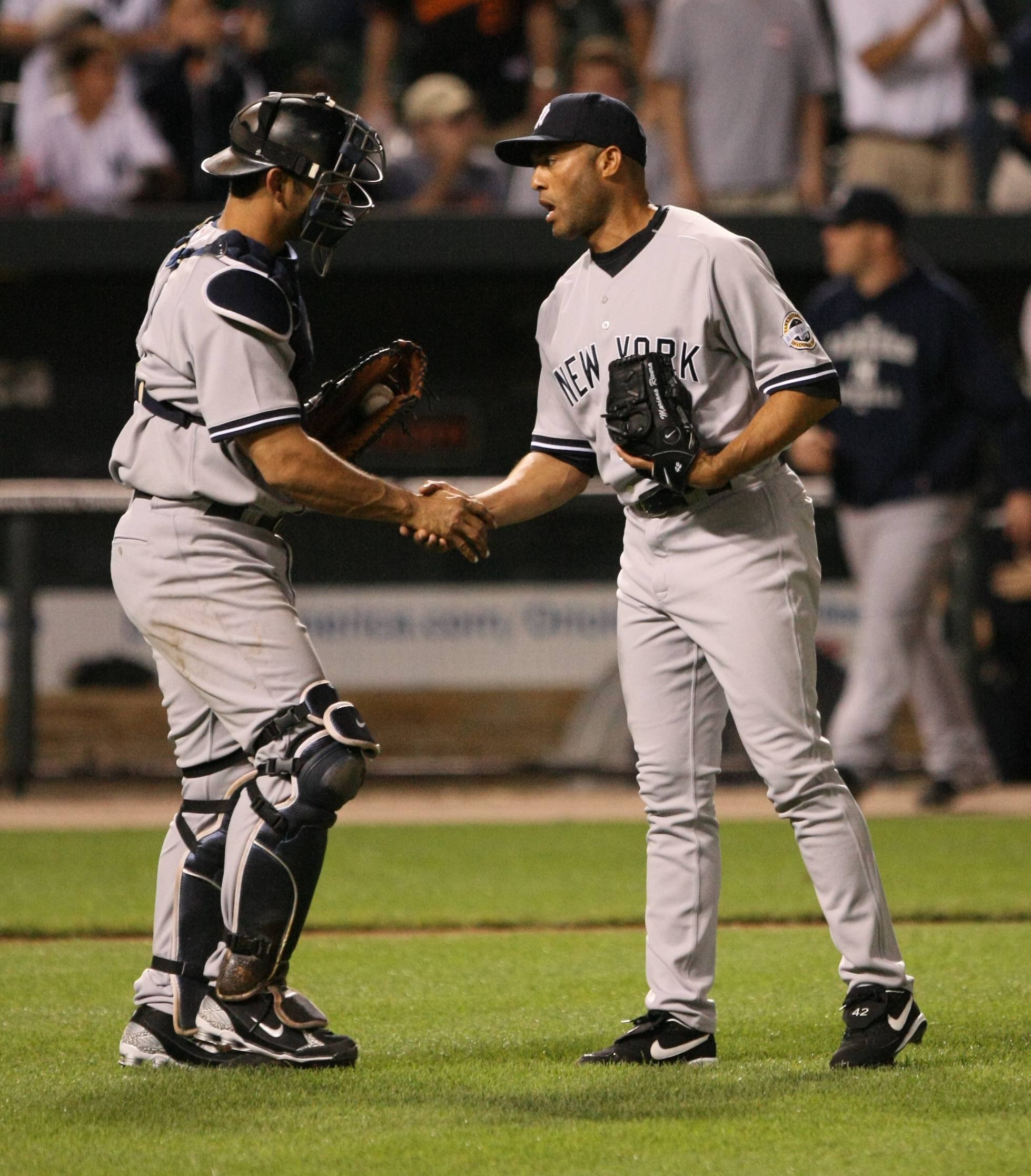
Rivera (right) shakes hands with Jorge Posada after finishing a game in 2009.

Rivera achieved a reputation as an all-time great reliever among baseball experts and his peers. Hall of Fame starter-turned-closer Dennis Eckersley called him "the best ever, no doubt", while Trevor Hoffman said he "will go down as the best reliever in the game in history". Torre said: "He's the best I've ever been around. Not only the ability to pitch and perform under pressure, but the calm he puts over the clubhouse." Writer Tom Verducci said: "Rivera is definitively the best at his position by a wider margin than any player at any position in the history of baseball. There is Rivera, a gulf, and then every other closer." He compared Rivera's reputation for being the best at his sport's position to those of Michael Jordan in basketball and Wayne Gretzky in ice hockey. MLB Commissioner Bud Selig said, "Clearly unequivocally, he's the greatest relief pitcher of all time, and did it in a way that was remarkable." Speaking about Rivera's looming presence at the end of games, Alex Rodriguez said: "He's the only guy in baseball who can change the game from a seat in the clubhouse or the bullpen. He would start affecting teams as early as the fifth inning, because they knew he was out there. I've never seen anyone who could affect a game like that." Gossage said that Rivera "might be the greatest closer of all-time" but suggested that the modern closer's job has become too specialized and easy compared to multiple-inning "firemen" from Gossage's era; Rivera had only one regular season save of seven-plus outs in his career, whereas Gossage logged 53. Rivera has been ranked among the greatest baseball players of all time, with The Athletic ranking him 91st in 2019, and ESPN.com ranking him 31st in 2022. Two years later, ESPN.com ranked him 59th on its list of the top 100 professional athletes of the 21st century.

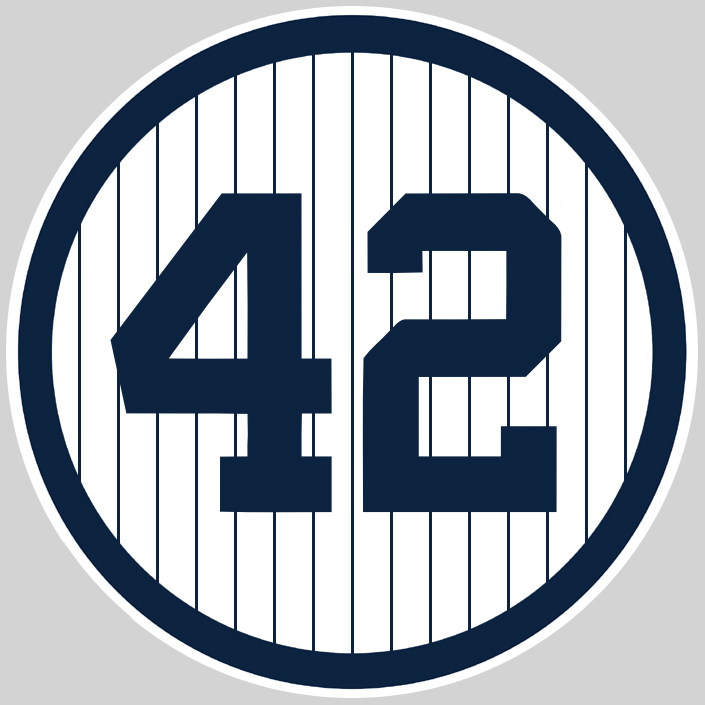
Mariano Rivera's number 42 was retired by the New York Yankees in 2013.

Rivera is well respected throughout baseball for his professionalism. Fellow closer Joe Nathan said: "I look up to how he's handled himself on and off the field... You never see him show up anyone and he respects the game. I've always looked up to him and it's always a compliment to be just mentioned in the same sentence as him." Michael Young said of Rivera: "I respect Mo more than anybody in the game. The guy goes out there, gets three outs and shakes [Jorge] Posada's hand. You appreciate someone who respects the game like he does, respects the people he plays with and against, and obviously his results speak for themselves." In a Sports Illustrated cover story about Rivera that was published in the final week of his career, Verducci said of the pitcher, "Few players in any sport have retired with more reverence from his peers." Rivera was the last MLB player to wear the uniform number 42 on a regular basis; at the time of his retirement, he was the only active player still grandfathered by the league to wear Jackie Robinson's retired number. Speaking about Rivera's connection to her husband, Robinson's widow Rachel said: "[Rivera] carried himself with dignity and grace, and that made carrying the number a tribute to Jack... I've always been proud and pleased that Mariano was the one chosen to wear that number because I think he brought something special to it." Presenting him with the Commissioner's Historic Achievement Award, Selig said: "Throughout his illustrious career, he has represented his family, his country, the Yankees and all of Major League Baseball with the utmost class and dignity. It is wholly appropriate that Mariano was the last Major League player to wear Jackie Robinson's sacred number 42."

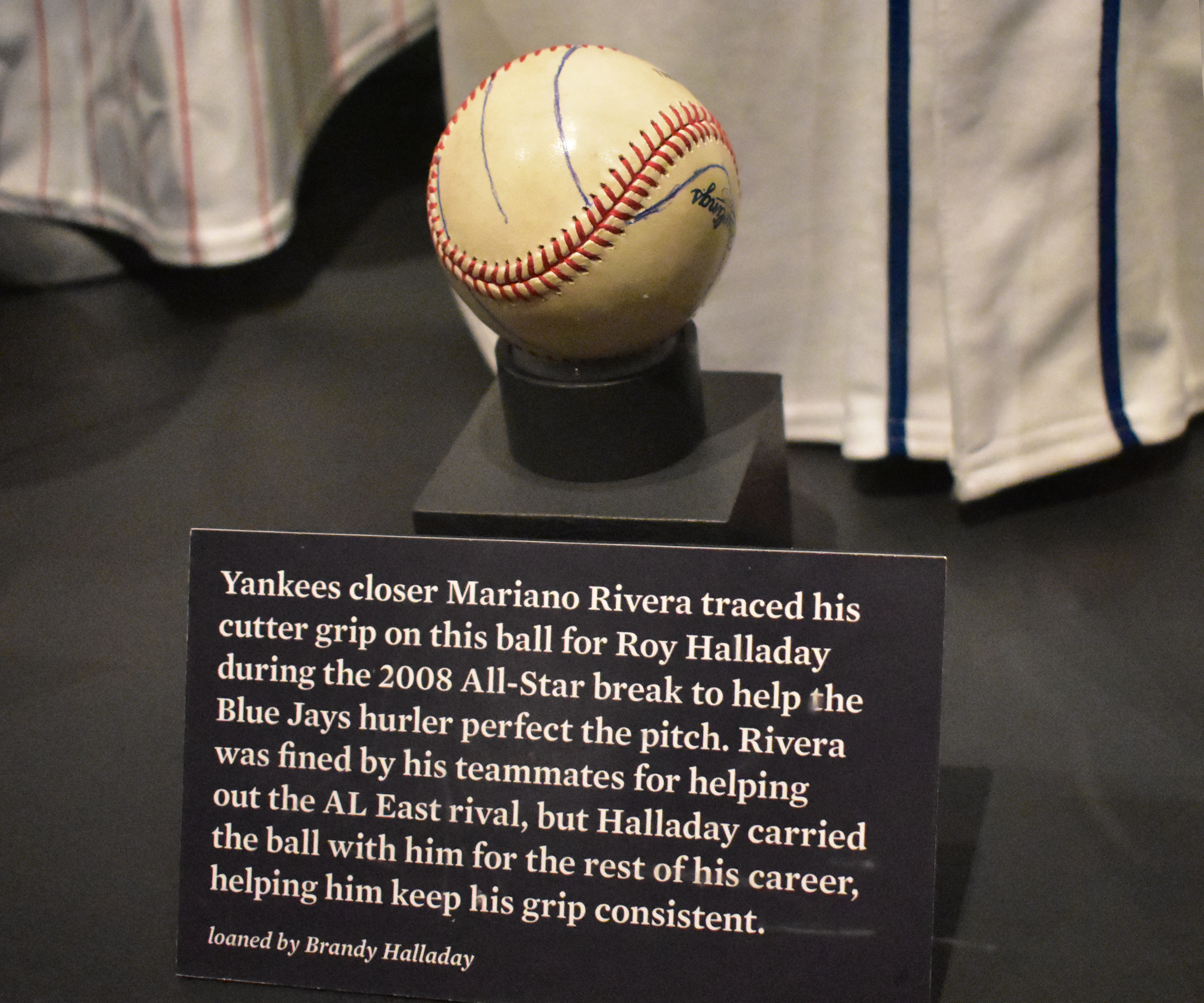
A ball onto which Roy Halladay traced Rivera's cutter grip as a reference, as seen in the National Baseball Hall of Fame and Museum

Rivera's cut fastball was a respected pitch among major league players. Jim Thome called it "the single best pitch ever in the game". David Ortiz echoed his sentiment, saying: "[Rivera's] cutter was the single best pitch I've ever seen, but the really amazing thing is how he was able to do it for so many years. Are there guys now who have stuff as nasty as Mariano? Maybe for one year, two years. But nobody could maintain it like he did." In 2004, ESPN.com ranked his cutter as the best "out pitch" in baseball. Olney described his cut fastball as "the most dominant pitch of a generation", while Theo DeRosa of MLB.com ranked it third on a list of the "nastiest pitches" in league history. Several of Rivera's colleagues credit him with popularizing the cutter among major league pitchers. Fellow closer Jason Isringhausen, who adopted the pitch later in his career, said: "I think he's been an influence on everybody that throws it. Everybody saw what [Rivera] could do, basically with one pitch. Nobody could throw it like he did, but now, you talk about the evolution of the cutter—just ask hitters about it and they tell you everybody's throwing one. And they hate it." Al Leiter, whose signature pitch was a cutter, echoed Isringhausen's sentiments: "Now, everybody throws it and Mo has had a huge influence on that. Pitchers watched him and marveled at what he did with one pitch." During the 2008 All-Star break, Roy Halladay consulted Rivera for help with his own cutter and traced the reliever's suggested grip onto a baseball as a visual reference; Rivera's willingness to help an opponent drew a playful fine from his teammates in the Yankees' kangaroo court.

== Personal life ==
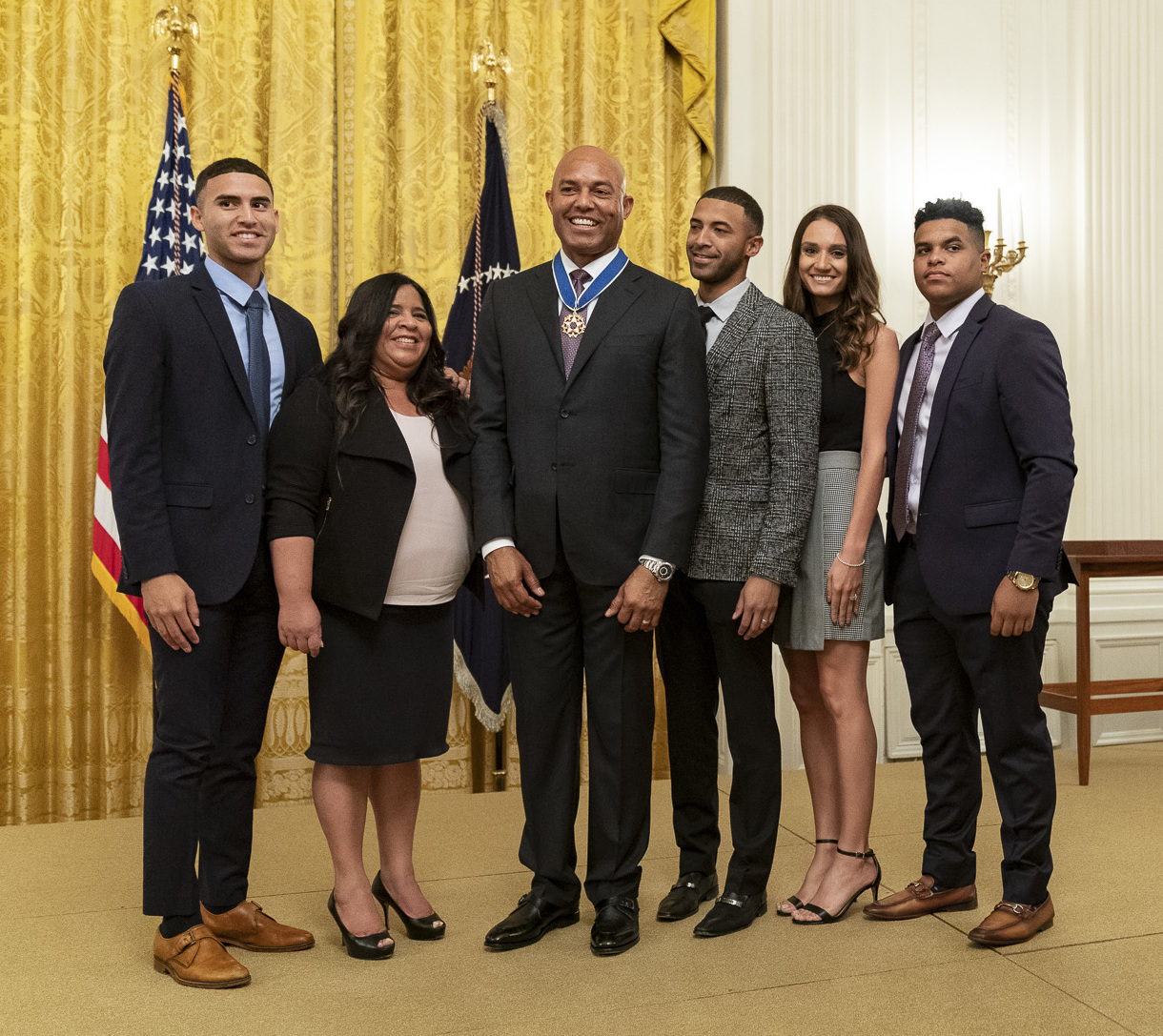
Rivera with his three sons, wife Clara, and daughter-in-law at the White House in 2019

Rivera and his wife Clara have known each other since elementary school, and they were married on November 9, 1991. They have three sons, including Mariano III. The family lived in Panama until 2000, when they relocated to Westchester County, New York. In 2006, the Riveras purchased a 13,000-square-foot (1,200 m^{2}) home in Rye, New York, for $5.7 million. They listed it for sale for $3.995 million in 2020, and sold it for $3.783 million in June 2022. The couple also sold a lakefront home in Tampa, Florida, for $3.2 million in December 2019.

Mariano III joined the Quinnipiac Bobcats baseball team as a walk-on, and after transferring, he also pitched for Iona College in New Rochelle, not far from his home. He was drafted by the Yankees with the 872nd pick in the 2014 MLB draft, but decided to return to Iona for his junior year. In the following year's draft, Mariano III was selected by the Washington Nationals in the fourth round with the 134th overall pick. After pitching for the Potomac Nationals minor league team for four seasons, he opened an automobile repair shop in Chester, New York, in 2020.

Over the course of his professional career, Rivera learned English, beginning in 1991 with the Greensboro Hornets, when he realized none of his teammates spoke his native Spanish. He is now a proponent of Latino players learning English and of American press members learning Spanish to bridge the cultural gap. He encouraged immigrants to the United States to make learning English their top priority. Rivera became a naturalized citizen of the United States in October 2015 and was recognized as an Outstanding American by Choice during the ceremony.

In February 2019, a Panamanian woman accused Rivera of failing to financially support her two children, a boy and a girl then aged 11 and 15, that Rivera had allegedly fathered out of wedlock. Five lawsuits were filed in his native country, demanding child support that he allegedly stopped paying two years earlier. He called the demands "unfounded", and the two sides ultimately settled the lawsuits.

=== Religion and philanthropy ===
Rivera is a devout Christian. During his childhood, neither he nor his family attended church, but after a born-again experience around the age of 21, Rivera became religious and converted from Catholicism to a Pentecostal faith. His parents followed his lead after seeing the difference it made in him. Rivera believes that God has a reason for everything that happens. For example, he found his failure in Game 7 of the 2001 World Series easier to deal with when he learned of the consequences it had for teammate Enrique Wilson. Had the Yankees won the series, Wilson would have remained in New York for the championship parade and would have departed for his native Dominican Republic on American Airlines Flight 587, which crashed shortly after takeoff and killed all 260 people aboard. Rivera told Wilson, "I am glad we lost the World Series, because it means that I still have a friend." Rivera's pitching glove was inscribed "Phil. 4:13", in reference to the Bible verse Philippians 4:13 ("I can do all things through Christ, who strengthens me").

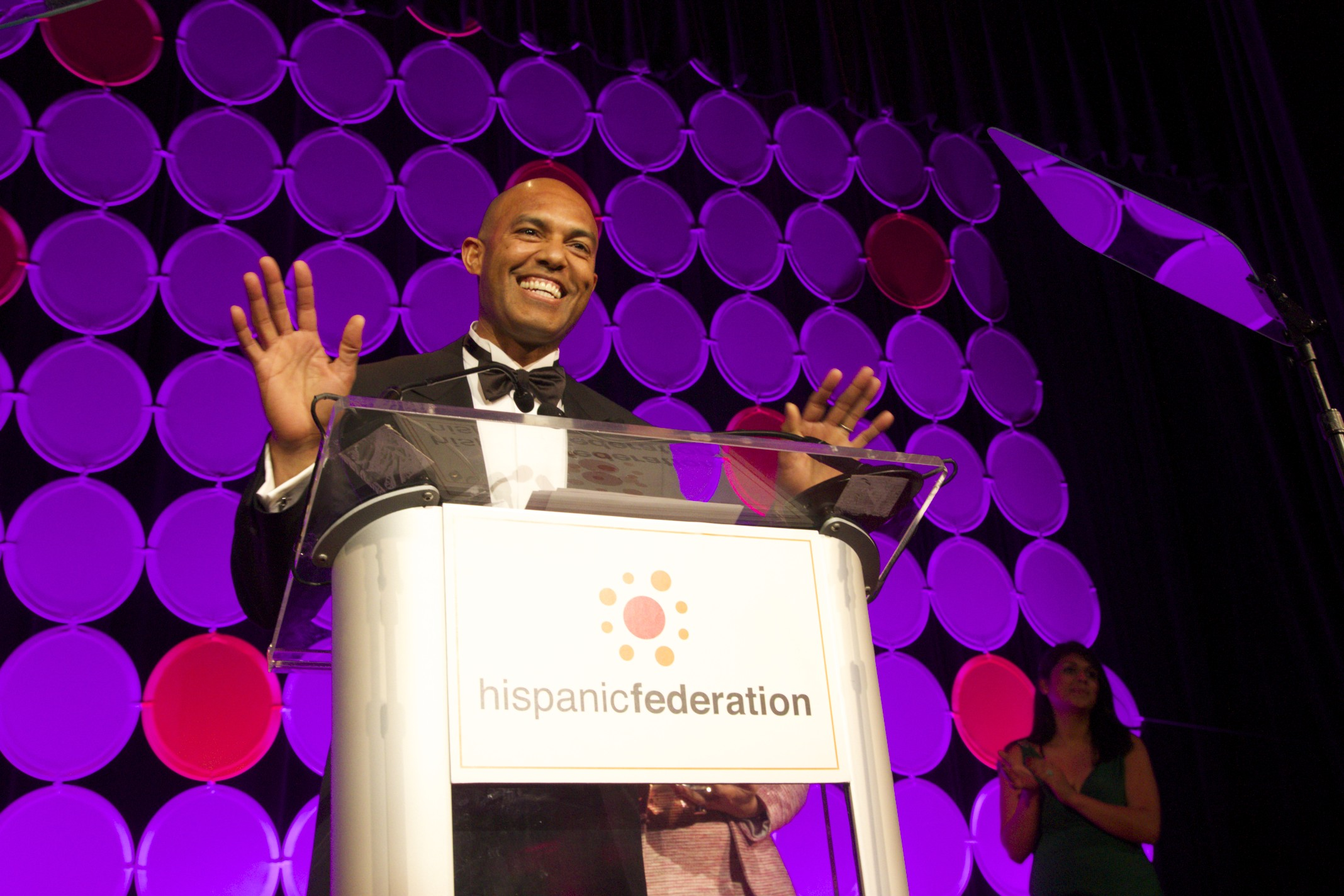
Rivera speaking at the Hispanic Federation Gala in April 2014 while accepting the Premio Orgullo for his humanitarian efforts

Rivera is involved with philanthropic efforts in several countries. The Mariano Rivera Foundation, a 501(c)(3) organization established in July 1998, helps provide underprivileged children with an education, distributing more than $500,000 annually in the US and Rivera's native Panama through church-based institutions. His contributions in Panama include building an elementary school, providing Christmas gifts to children, and developing a program that provides computer access and adult mentors to youths. Rivera has funded church start-ups in Panama, Mexico, the Dominican Republic, California, Florida, and New York. In 2011, he acquired a 107-year-old church from the city of New Rochelle for $1, and after his foundation renovated it at a cost of $3 million, it opened in March 2014 as Refugio de Esperanza ("Refuge of Hope"). The church is part of the Assemblies of God organization and hosts a Pentecostal congregation that previously met at Rivera's home, with his wife Clara serving as its pastor.

For years, the Mariano Rivera Foundation was a private institution, but during his final baseball season in 2013, many teams wanted to commemorate the pitcher by donating to his foundation. As a result, he formed a public version of it; Naomi Gandia was appointed its executive director, working from its headquarters in Stanton, Delaware. Since retiring from baseball, Rivera has dedicated himself to philanthropy and his churches. In 2014, he and Clara created a scholarship in their names that they have awarded to students at the local College of New Rochelle. Recently, Rivera has organized an annual charity golf tournament that benefits White Plains Hospital and his foundation. He also holds multiple events annually in Delaware, including giveaways of backpacks with school supplies to children, distribution of turkey dinners during the holiday season, and the "Mariano Rivera Foundation 5K & Kids Run". In 2021, his foundation launched the Mariano Rivera Mentorship Program, a faith-based initiative aimed at serving underprivileged males in Gainesville, Florida; New Rochelle; and Houston.

In 2012, the Giving Back Fund estimated that Rivera donated $627,500 to charity in 2010, ranking him as the 25th-most generous celebrity on a list that the fund compiled. He won the 2013 Marvin Miller Man of the Year Award, which is given to the MLB player "who inspires others through his on-field performances and contributions to his community".

=== Business interests and endorsements ===
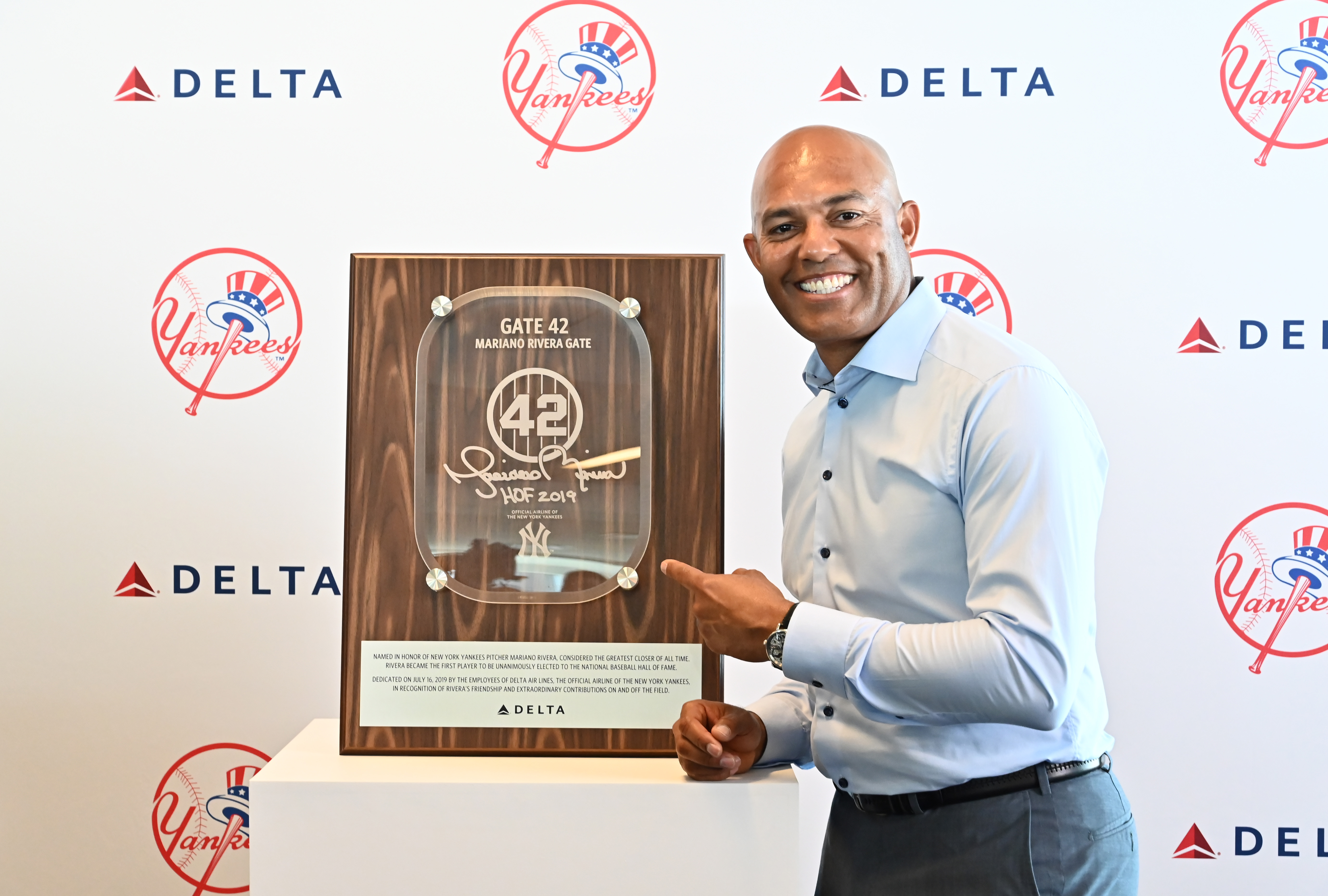
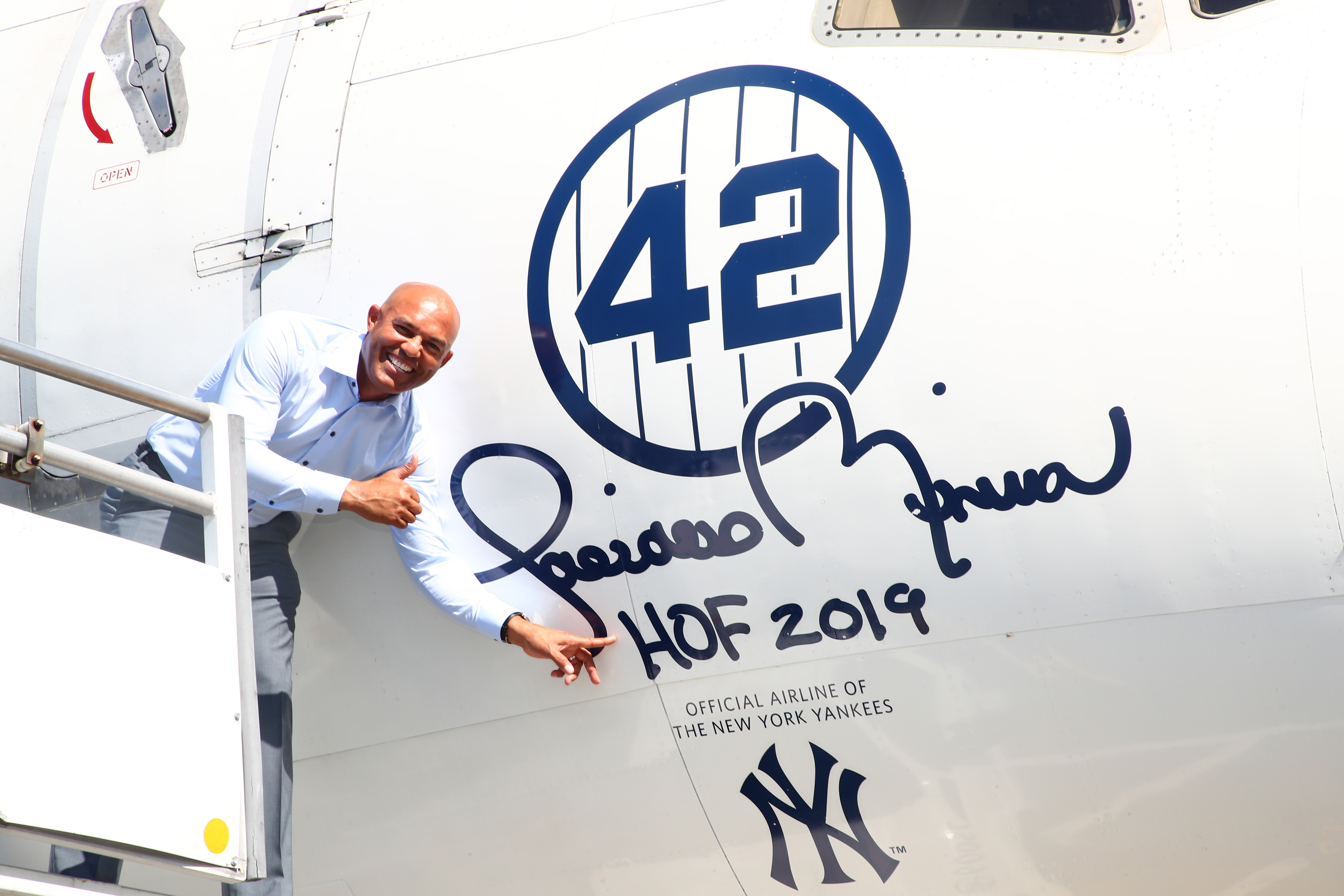
Rivera in 2019 at John F. Kennedy International Airport during the dedication of a gate and a Boeing 757 by Delta Air Lines

Rivera was an investor in two New York area restaurants: "Clubhouse Grill", which opened in New Rochelle in 2006 as "Mo's New York Grill"; and Siro's, which opened in Manhattan in 2012. Both restaurants have since closed. In 2015, he opened a Toyota and Scion car dealership in Mount Kisco, New York, and in 2022, he opened a Honda dealership in Port Jefferson Station, New York. He is a founder and part-owner of Cherri Cafe, a coffee company focused on Central American coffee, especially Panamanian beans. Rivera joined the Washington Speakers Bureau in July 2019 as a paid public speaker. In July 2022, he became co-president of the newly formed United International Baseball League, the first professional baseball league in the Middle East and South Asia; in November of that year, it was announced that the league had been renamed Baseball United and that he had joined its investment and ownership group. In May 2026, Rivera launched a line of three hot sauces under the brand name "Mo's Heat", which was made in partnership with the Panamanian hot sauce company D'Elidas.

In June 2026, it was reported that Rivera had been defrauded of $1 million that he invested in a non-existent development project called Orlando World Live. Florida resident Steven H. Minard was arrested the month prior and was accused of attempting to deceive and defraud Rivera between August 2021 and September 2023. After convincing Rivera to invest in the project, Minard allegedly did not provide him with critical information. Minard later agreed to return the funds to Rivera but allegedly sent him falsified bank statements and wire transfer records instead to convince him repayment was in progress.

Rivera has been a celebrity spokesman for several companies, including: Nike sports apparel; Canali, a premium men's clothing company, as their first athlete spokesperson; the New York Acura Dealers; Skechers footwear; and The Hartford Financial Services Group. Rivera donated all his earnings from endorsement deals to his foundation. In June 2019, a partnership between Rivera and e-commerce website eBay was announced. According to eBay, the company created a collection of Rivera-centric sports memorabilia that included 42 game-used and personal items donated by him for auction to benefit his foundation. In 2024, he modeled for a streetwear collaboration between the New York Yankees and the clothing company New York or Nowhere.

A 2011 list by the marketing firm Nielsen ranked him as the second-most marketable player in baseball behind only Derek Jeter; the list accounted for personal attributes such as sincerity, approachability, experience, and influence. Based on sales figures from Majestic Athletic, Rivera had the 18th-best-selling MLB jersey in 2011, and the top-selling jersey in the second half of 2013. He earned approximately $169.6 million in salary during his baseball career, ten percent of which he donated to his foundation.

=== Politics ===
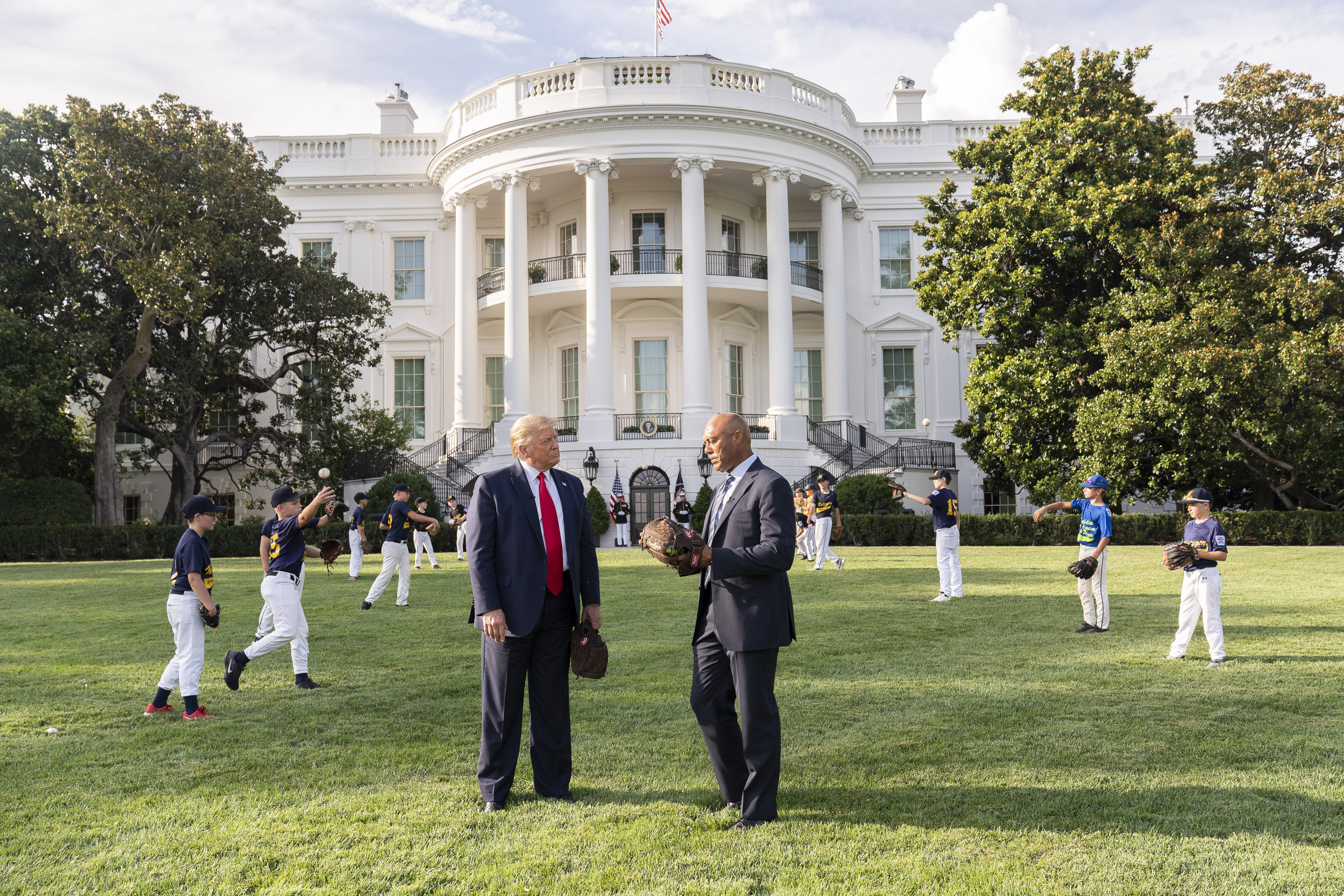
Rivera and US president Donald Trump host Little League Baseball players on the South Lawn of the White House in July 2020

Rivera is a supporter of Israel as a Jewish state. In 2013, the New York Board of Rabbis (NYBR) named him their "Man of the Year". The organization helped facilitate trips to Israel in 2015 and 2018 in which Rivera participated. The latter trip included a visit to Michve Alon, an Israel Defense Forces base, that was arranged by Friends of the Israel Defense Forces. Rivera attended the Christians United for Israel conference in July 2019.

Rivera served on the Opioid and Drug Abuse Commission formed by US president Donald Trump in March 2017. The following May, Rivera was nominated to co-chair the President's Council on Sports, Fitness, and Nutrition. He was appointed to a second two-year term on the council in December 2020. He continued as a co-chair until 2022, when President Joe Biden appointed new co-chairs, but continued to serve as member of the council. Rivera was once again named to the council in 2025 for Trump's second presidency.

In August 2018, he co-hosted a fundraiser dinner for the America First Action PAC with Donald Trump Jr. and Kimberly Guilfoyle. In response to a Daily Beast article in July 2019 that labeled his politics "far-right", Rivera defended himself and affirmed his support for President Trump, saying: "I respect him, I respect what he does. I believe that he's doing the best for the United States of America." Rivera said that their friendship predated Trump's presidency and that he would not "turn [his] back on [Trump]". Rivera continued to support Trump into 2024, endorsing him prior to that year's presidential election.

=== Lawsuit against Refuge of Hope church ===
In January 2025, a civil lawsuit was filed in Westchester County against Rivera's church Refuge of Hope, in which he and his wife Clara were accused of failing to protect an underage female member of their congregation from multiple incidents of sexual assault. According to the lawsuit, Clara convinced the girl's mother to allow her daughter to participate in a 2018 summer internship at Ignite Life Center, a fellow Assemblies of God church in Florida that was affiliated with Refuge of Hope. There, the girl was allegedly assaulted by an older minor female on 15 occasions. After the victim's mother became concerned for her daughter's safety and contacted Clara, the Rivera couple allegedly traveled to Florida and urged the victim to remain quiet. The lawsuit also alleges that she was sexually assaulted by the same person later that summer in the Riveras' home in Rye while attending a barbecue, and by a male youth leader at Refuge of Hope in 2021. An attorney for the Riveras said the allegations against them were false and claimed the couple first heard about the sex abuse in 2022 after an attorney sent them a letter requesting a financial settlement. In a revised filing of the lawsuit submitted in April, the Riveras were added as defendants, replacing an LLC at the address of their former home that they were no longer associated with.

== Post-baseball honors and life ==
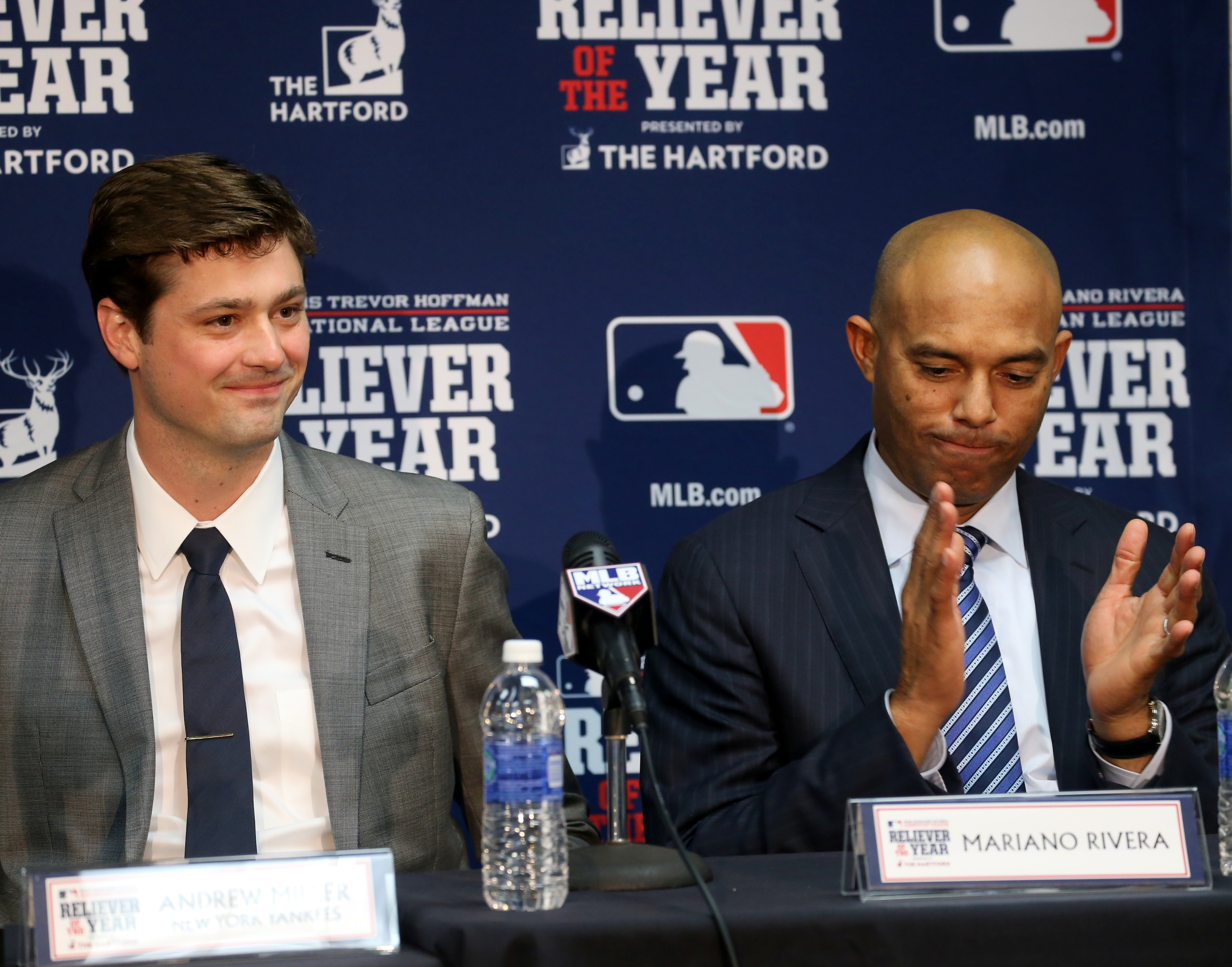
Rivera (right) at the presentation of the 2015 AL Reliever of the Year Award to Andrew Miller. The award was named in Rivera's honor the year prior.

In March 2014, Rivera was twice recognized for his philanthropic efforts, receiving the ROBIE Humanitarian Award from the Jackie Robinson Foundation, as well as a Jefferson Award for Public Service. Later that month, the "Legends Series", comprising two MLB exhibition games between the Yankees and Miami Marlins, was played in Rivera's native Panama to "honor [his] legacy". He helped promote the games, which were accompanied by charitable events and a gala benefiting his foundation.

On April 9, 2014, MLB announced that a new annual award for relief pitchers, the Reliever of the Year Award, would replace the existing Delivery Man of the Year Award, and that the AL honor would be named after Rivera. The following month, a section of River Avenue bordering Yankee Stadium at 161st Street was renamed "Rivera Avenue" in the pitcher's honor. This coincided with the release of his autobiography, The Closer: My Story, co-authored with Wayne Coffey. New York University bestowed an honorary Doctor of Humane Letters degree upon Rivera during its commencement ceremony at Yankee Stadium on May 21, 2014. During the 2015 Little League World Series, he was inducted into the Little League Hall of Excellence. The Yankees dedicated a plaque to Rivera in Yankee Stadium's Monument Park on August 14, 2016.

Rivera was elected to the National Baseball Hall of Fame on January 22, 2019, in his first year of eligibility. He became the first player in history to be elected unanimously by the BBWAA, appearing on all 425 ballots; the previous record for election percentage was held by Ken Griffey Jr., who received 99.3% of votes in 2016. Rivera was the second Panamanian player to be elected to the Hall of Fame after Rod Carew, and the eighth relief pitcher. He was officially inducted into the Hall of Fame on July 21, 2019, in Cooperstown, New York. The ceremony was attended by 55,000 people, the second-largest crowd for a Hall of Fame induction. Among those in attendance were Panamanian president Laurentino Cortizo and Rivera's former teammates, including Bernie Williams, who performed "The Star-Spangled Banner" and "Take Me Out to the Ballgame" on guitar. Rivera's speech concluded the ceremony and lasted nearly 25 minutes, four of which he spoke in Spanish.

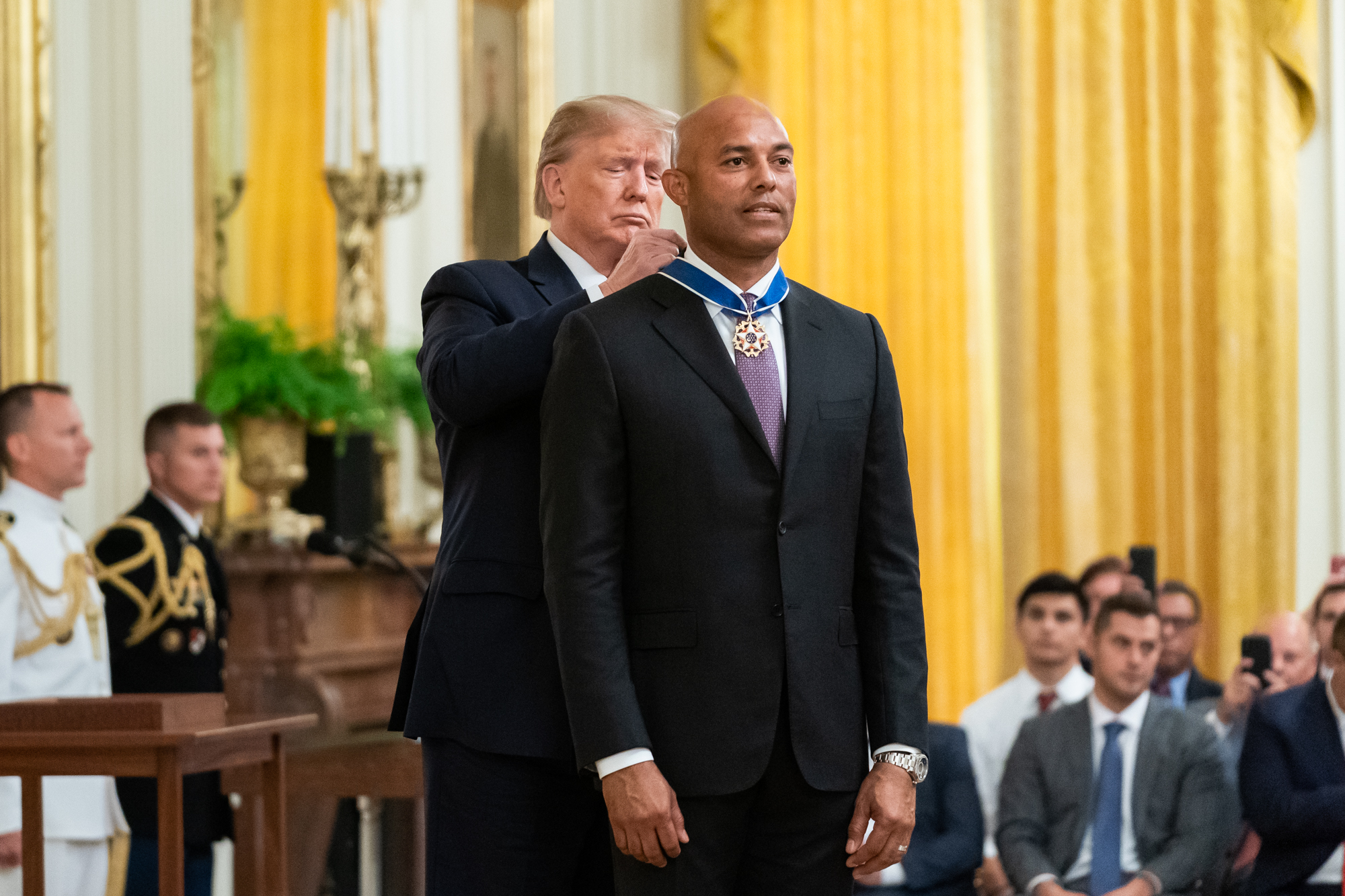
Rivera receiving the Presidential Medal of Freedom in 2019

Leading up to and following his induction into the National Baseball Hall of Fame, Rivera was recognized by several institutions. The New York Racing Association hosted him at Saratoga Race Course as their guest of honor on July 12, 2019, and held a fundraising luncheon to benefit his foundation. At John F. Kennedy International Airport in New York City, Gate 42B at Terminal 4 was renamed for Rivera in a ceremony with Delta Air Lines, which also placed a sticker bearing his signature and uniform number on one of their airplanes. On July 27, the City of New Rochelle held a parade in his honor and awarded him a key to the city. The Yankees held a pregame celebration for him at Yankee Stadium on August 17 and made a $250,000 donation to his foundation. On September 16, 2019, President Trump, a long-time Yankees fan, presented Rivera with the Presidential Medal of Freedom, the highest civilian award that can be bestowed upon a person by the United States government. A statement on whitehouse.gov said: "Off the field, through the Mariano Rivera Foundation, he has helped provide children in need with an education, empowering them to achieve a better future. The United States proudly honors Mariano Rivera for being a legend of the game of baseball and for his commitment to strengthening America's communities."

A 10,000-seat baseball stadium named for Rivera, Estadio Mariano Rivera, opened in April 2025 in his home district of La Chorrera, Panama. The venue cost $45 million and was built to MLB specifications. As part of the stadium's opening, the Panamanian Baseball Federation announced that it was retiring the uniform number 42 in Rivera's honor.

While playing in an exhibition baseball game during the Yankees' Old-Timers' Day on August 9, 2025, Rivera ruptured his Achilles tendon.

== Baseball accomplishments ==
=== Awards and honors ===
| Award/Honor | # of Times | Dates | Refs |
|---|---|---|---|
| All-Star Game MVP Award | 1 | 2013 | |
| American League All-Star | 13 | 1997; 1999; 2000; 2001; 2002; 2004; 2005; 2006; 2008; 2009; 2010; 2011; 2013 | |
| American League Championship Series MVP Award (Note: Only reliever to win both a League Championship Series MVP Award and World Series MVP Award) | 1 | 2003 | |
| American League Comeback Player of the Year Award | 1 | 2013 | |
| American League Player of the Week | 3 | May 26 – June 1, 2008; June 22–28, 2009; September 19–25, 2011 | |
| American League Rolaids Relief Man Award (Note: Tied for most times won) | 5 | 1999; 2001; 2004; 2005; 2009 | |
| Babe Ruth Award | 1 | 1999 | |
| Commissioner's Historic Achievement Award | 1 | 2013 | |
| Clutch Performer of the Month Award | 1 | June 2010 | |
| Delivery Man of the Year Award (Note: Most times won) | 3 | 2005; 2006; 2009 | |
| Delivery Man of the Month Award | 2 | April 2008; July 2009 | |
| Marvin Miller Man of the Year Award | 1 | 2013 | |
| New York Yankees Player of the Year | 1 | 2005 | |
| National Baseball Hall of Fame – induction | 1 | 2019 | |
| Sporting News Comeback Player of the Year Award | 1 | 2013 | |
| Sporting News Pro Athlete of the Year Award | 1 | 2009 | |
| Sporting News Reliever of the Year Award | 6 | 1997; 1999; 2001; 2004; 2005; 2009 | |
| This Year in Baseball's Closer of the Year Award | 4 | 2004; 2005; 2006; 2009 | |
| Thurman Munson Award | 1 | 2003 | |
| World Series MVP Award | 1 | 1999 | |
| World Series champion | 5 | 1996; 1998; 1999; 2000; 2009 | |

=== Records ===
MLB records
| Record | Number | Refs |
Regular season
| Most career saves | 652 | |
| Most career games finished | 952 | |
| Highest career adjusted ERA+ (minimum 1,000 innings pitched) | 205 | |
| Most career games pitched with single team Most career games pitched in American League history Most career games pitched by right-handed pitcher | 1,115 | |
| Most consecutive seasons with at least one save (Note: Tied with John Franco) | 18 (1996–2013) | |
| Most seasons with at least 20 saves Most seasons with at least 25 saves | 16 (1997–2011, 2013) | |
| Most consecutive seasons with at least 25 saves | 15 (1997–2011) | |
| Most seasons with at least 30 saves | 15 (1997–2001, 2003–11, 2013) | |
| Most consecutive seasons with at least 30 saves | 9 (2003–11) | |
| Most seasons with at least 35 saves (Note: Tied with Trevor Hoffman) | 12 (1997–2001, 2003–05, 2008–09, 2011, 2013) | |
| Most seasons with at least 40 saves | 9 (1997, 1999, 2001, 2003–05, 2009, 2011, 2013) | |
| Most seasons with at least 50 saves (Note: Tied with Éric Gagné and Jim Johnson) | 2 (2001, 2004) | |
| Most seasons with sub-2.00 ERA (minimum 60 innings pitched each) (Note: Tied with Walter Johnson); Most seasons with 20-plus saves and sub-2.00 ERA | 11 (1997–99, 2003–06, 2008–11) | |
| Most seasons with at least 20 saves, sub-2.00 ERA, and sub-1.00 WHIP | 7 (1999, 2005–06, 2008–11) | |
| Most career saves for a single winning pitcher | 72 (Andy Pettitte) | |
| Most career interleague saves | 75 | |
| Most career saves in a single ballpark | 230 (original Yankee Stadium) | |
Postseason
| Lowest career ERA (minimum 30 innings pitched) | 0.70 | |
| Most career saves | 42 | |
| Most consecutive scoreless innings pitched | 33 1/3 | |
| Most consecutive save opportunities converted | 23 | |
| Most consecutive scoreless appearances | 23 | |
| Most career two-inning saves | 14 | |
| Most career games pitched | 96 | |
| Most career saves in each postseason round (non-Wild Card Series) | 18 (DS); 13 (LCS); 11 (WS) | |
| Most career games pitched in each postseason round (non-Wild Card Series) | 39 (DS); 33 (LCS); 24 (WS) | |
| Lowest career ERA in Division Series history (minimum 20 innings pitched) | 0.32 | |
| Most career saves to clinch series | 8 | |
| Most games finished to clinch series | 16 | |
| Most games finished to clinch World Series championship | 4 | |
| Highest career win probability added | 11.7 | |
| Highest career championship win probability added | 183 (or 1.83) | |
All-Star Game
| Most career saves | 4 | |

Yankees records
| Record | Number | Refs |
Regular season
| Most career games pitched | 1,115 | |
| Highest career wins above replacement (Baseball Reference version) for a pitcher | 56.3 | |
| Highest career win probability added for a pitcher | 56.6 | |
| Most saves in single season | 53 (2004) | |
| Lowest career WHIP (minimum 500 innings pitched) | 1.00 | |
| Most consecutive save opportunities converted | 36 | |
| Most scoreless appearances in single season (Note: Tied with Tom Gordon and Brent Headrick) | 65 (2004) | |
| Most games finished in single season | 69 (2004) | |

== See also ==
- List of Major League Baseball career ERA leaders
- List of Major League Baseball career FIP leaders
- List of Major League Baseball career WAR leaders
- List of Major League Baseball players from Panama
- List of Major League Baseball players who spent their entire career with one franchise
- List of Presidential Medal of Freedom recipients

Awards and achievements
| Preceded by Trevor Hoffman | All-Time Saves Leader; 2011–present | Incumbent |
