= Baseball Writers' Association of America Relief Pitcher of the Year Award =

Annual award in Major League Baseball

The Baseball Writers' Association of America Relief Pitcher of the Year Award was announced by the Baseball Writers' Association of America (BBWAA) in August 2025 and will be awarded for the first time at the end of the 2026 Major League Baseball (MLB) season.

The BBWAA already issues several annual awards, including the Cy Young Award for the best pitcher. At the inception of its relief pitcher award, the last time a reliever had won the Cy Young in the National League was in 2003 by Éric Gagné, and the last time in the American League was in 1992 by Dennis Eckersley. While the writers had not previously had an award for the best reliever, the award has several predecessors, including the Rolaids Relief Man Award and MLB Delivery Man of the Year. Currently, MLB awards the Reliever of the Year Award, and the Sporting News has a Relief Pitcher of the Year Award.

== Winners ==
=== National League ===
Year	Player	Team	SV	ERA	WHIP	K	IP	Ref
2026	Mason Miller	San Diego Padres	38	1.67	0.90	129	70	

=== American League ===
Year	Player	Team	SV	ERA	WHIP	K	IP	Ref
2026	Louis Varland	Toronto Blue Jays	35	1.27	1.000	97	78	

== See also ==
- The Sporting News Reliever of the Year Award (1960–2010; one in each league)
