= Major League Baseball Reliever of the Month Award =

Monthly award in Major League Baseball

- Sport: Baseball
- League: Major League Baseball
- Awarded for: Best relief pitcher in the American League and National League
- Sponsored by: The Hartford (2017–2020)
- Country: United States, Canada
- Presented by: Major League Baseball

History
- First award: 2017
- Most wins: Edwin Díaz (10)
- Most recent: September 2026: Mason Montgomery (NL); Cade Smith (AL)

Major League Baseball (MLB) honors its best relief pitchers with a Reliever of the Month Award for one pitcher in the American League (AL) and one in the National League (NL) during each month of the regular season. These awards have been issued since 2017. From 2005 to 2013, MLB honored a single relief pitcher across both leagues with the Delivery Man of the Month Award during each month of the regular season.

== Awards by month ==
MLB previously introduced a Reliever of the Year Award in 2014, awarded to one reliever in the American League and one in the National League. In 2017, MLB added a monthly award, also given to one reliever in each league, for each month of the regular season. The award was sponsored by The Hartford, a Connecticut-based investment and insurance company, from inception through the 2020 season.

The most Reliever of the Month awards won by a single player are ten by Edwin Díaz. He is followed by Josh Hader (9), Emmanuel Clase (7), Aroldis Chapman (5), Mason Miller (5), Liam Hendriks (4), and Raisel Iglesias (4).

The table below lists monthly winners; a number in parentheses indicates how many times each player has won the award.

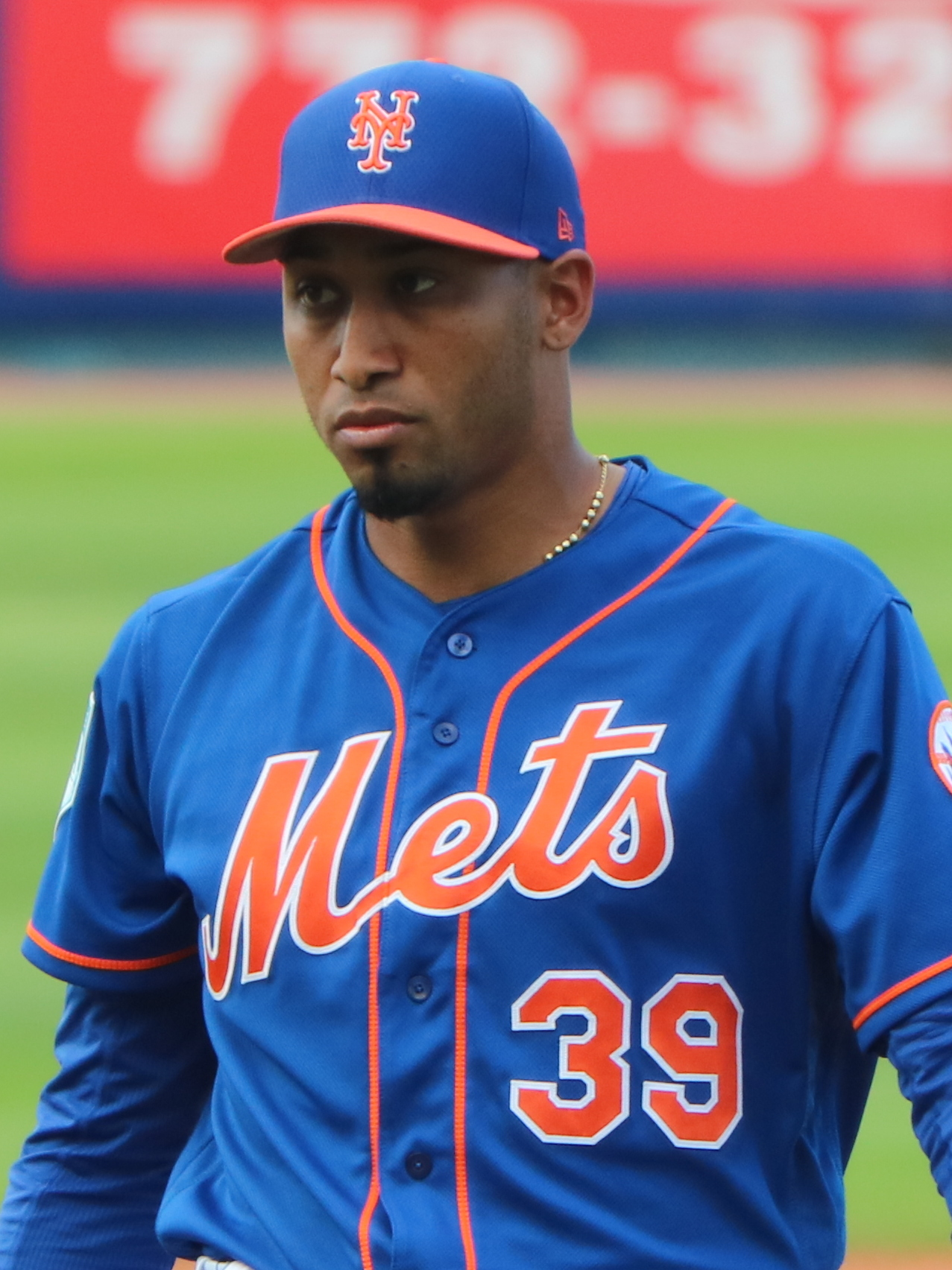
Edwin Díaz has won the award five times with the Seattle Mariners and five times with the New York Mets.

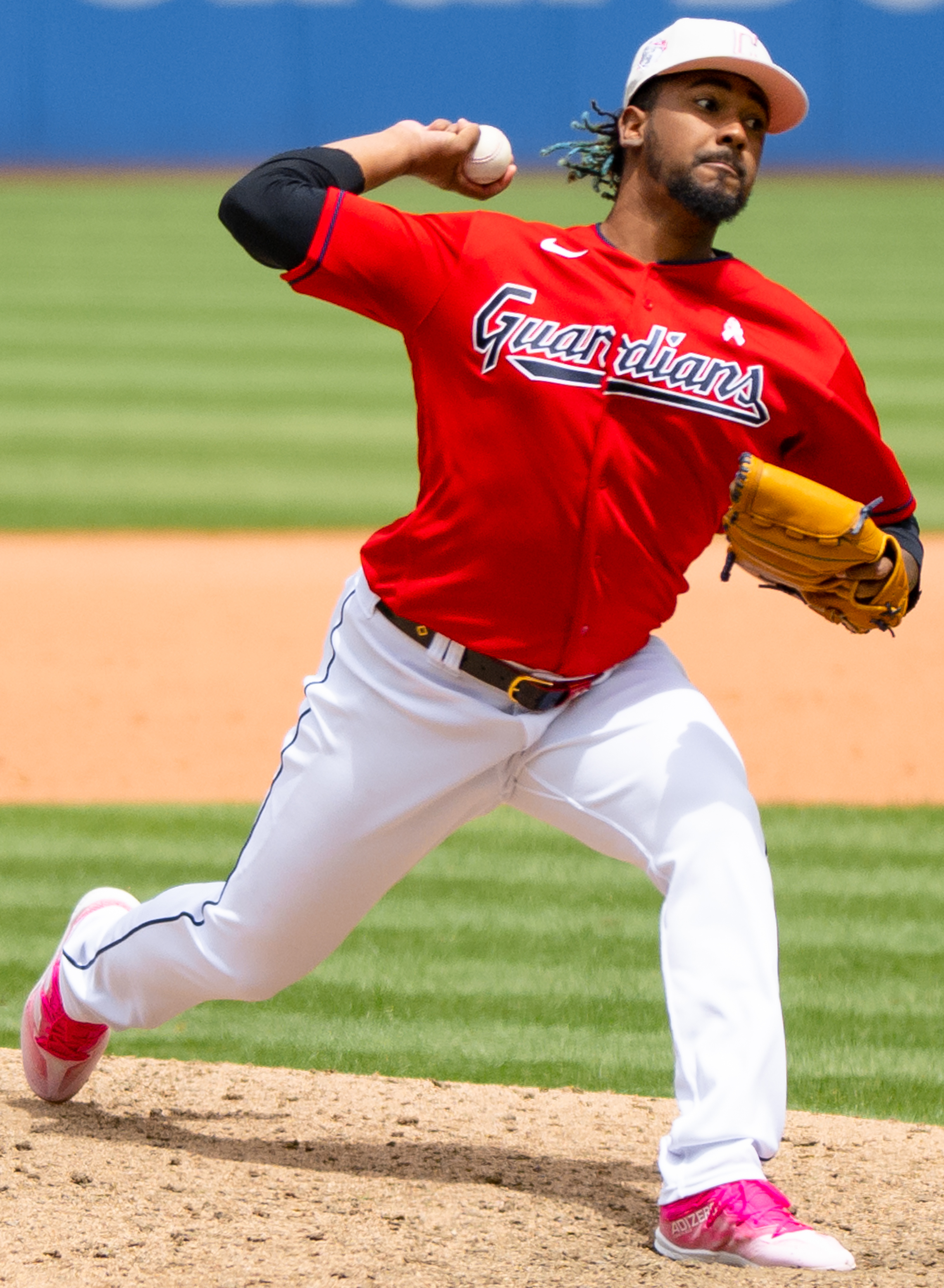
Emmanuel Clase won the award seven times with the Cleveland Indians/Guardians.

Year	Month	American League		National League		Ref.
Year	Month	Player	Team	Player	Team	Ref.
2017	April	Cody Allen	Cleveland Indians	Greg Holland	Colorado Rockies	
2017	May	Craig Kimbrel	Boston Red Sox	Greg Holland (2)	Colorado Rockies	
2017	June	Roberto Osuna	Toronto Blue Jays	Kenley Jansen	Los Angeles Dodgers	
2017	July	Edwin Díaz	Seattle Mariners	Brad Hand	San Diego Padres	
2017	August	Álex Colomé	Tampa Bay Rays	Corey Knebel	Milwaukee Brewers	
2017	September	Aroldis Chapman	New York Yankees	Sean Doolittle	Washington Nationals	
2018	April	Edwin Díaz (2)	Seattle Mariners	Josh Hader	Milwaukee Brewers	
2018	May	Blake Treinen	Oakland Athletics	Brad Hand (2)	San Diego Padres	
2018	June	Edwin Díaz (3)	Seattle Mariners	Kyle Barraclough	Miami Marlins	
2018	July	Edwin Díaz (4)	Seattle Mariners	Felipe Vázquez	Pittsburgh Pirates	
2018	August	Edwin Díaz (5)	Seattle Mariners	Héctor Neris	Philadelphia Phillies	
2018	September	Blake Treinen (2)	Oakland Athletics	Corey Knebel (2)	Milwaukee Brewers	
2019	March–April	Shane Greene	Detroit Tigers	Kirby Yates	San Diego Padres	
2019	May	Aroldis Chapman (2)	New York Yankees	Josh Hader (2)	Milwaukee Brewers	
2019	June	Liam Hendriks	Oakland Athletics	Josh Hader (3)	Milwaukee Brewers	
2019	July	Tommy Kahnle	New York Yankees	Seth Lugo	New York Mets	
2019	August	Aroldis Chapman (3)	New York Yankees	Felipe Vázquez (2)	Pittsburgh Pirates	
2019	September	Brandon Workman	Boston Red Sox	Brent Suter	Milwaukee Brewers	
2020	July–August	Liam Hendriks (2)	Oakland Athletics	Kenley Jansen (2)	Los Angeles Dodgers	
2020	September	Mike Mayers	Los Angeles Angels	Devin Williams	Milwaukee Brewers	
2021	April	Matt Barnes	Boston Red Sox	Mark Melancon	San Diego Padres	
2021	May	Liam Hendriks (3)	Chicago White Sox	Ryan Tepera	Chicago Cubs	
2021	June	Lou Trivino	Oakland Athletics	Josh Hader (4)	Milwaukee Brewers	
2021	July	Raisel Iglesias	Los Angeles Angels	Jake McGee	San Francisco Giants	
2021	August	Emmanuel Clase	Cleveland Indians	Devin Williams (2)	Milwaukee Brewers	
2021	September	Liam Hendriks (4)	Chicago White Sox	Camilo Doval	San Francisco Giants	
2022	April	Jordan Romano	Toronto Blue Jays	Josh Hader (5)	Milwaukee Brewers	
2022	May	Clay Holmes	New York Yankees	David Bednar	Pittsburgh Pirates	
2022	June	Emmanuel Clase (2)	Cleveland Guardians	Edwin Díaz (6)	New York Mets	
2022	July	Jordan Romano (2)	Toronto Blue Jays	Edwin Díaz (7)	New York Mets	
2022	August	Emmanuel Clase (3)	Cleveland Guardians	Edwin Díaz (8)	New York Mets	
2022	September	Emmanuel Clase (4)	Cleveland Guardians	Camilo Doval (2)	San Francisco Giants	
2023	April	Félix Bautista	Baltimore Orioles	Josh Hader (6)	San Diego Padres	
2023	May	Alex Lange	Detroit Tigers	Camilo Doval (3)	San Francisco Giants	
2023	June	Félix Bautista (2)	Baltimore Orioles	Craig Kimbrel (2)	Philadelphia Phillies	
2023	July	Félix Bautista (3)	Baltimore Orioles	Devin Williams	Milwaukee Brewers	
2023	August	Andrés Muñoz	Seattle Mariners	Raisel Iglesias (2)	Atlanta Braves	
2023	September	Clay Holmes (2)	New York Yankees	Tanner Scott	Miami Marlins	
2024	April	Mason Miller	Oakland Athletics	Ryan Helsley	St. Louis Cardinals	
2024	May	Emmanuel Clase (5)	Cleveland Guardians	Robert Suárez	San Diego Padres	
2024	June	Carlos Estévez	Los Angeles Angels	Ryan Helsley (2)	St. Louis Cardinals	
2024	July	Emmanuel Clase (6)	Cleveland Guardians	Tanner Scott (2)	Miami Marlins/San Diego Padres	
2024	August	Josh Hader (7)	Houston Astros	Raisel Iglesias (3)	Atlanta Braves	
2024	September	Emmanuel Clase (7)	Cleveland Guardians	Ryan Helsley (3)	St. Louis Cardinals	
2025	April	Andrés Muñoz (2)	Seattle Mariners	Robert Suárez (2)	San Diego Padres	
2025	May	Jhoan Durán	Minnesota Twins	Edwin Díaz (9)	New York Mets	
2025	June	Josh Hader (8)	Houston Astros	David Bednar (2)	Pittsburgh Pirates	
2025	July	Kenley Jansen (3)	Los Angeles Angels	Edwin Díaz (10)	New York Mets	
2025	August	Aroldis Chapman (4)	Boston Red Sox	Raisel Iglesias (4)	Atlanta Braves	
2025	September	Cade Smith	Cleveland Guardians	Mason Miller (2)	San Diego Padres	
2026	April	Louis Varland	Toronto Blue Jays	Mason Miller (3)	San Diego Padres	
2026	May	Cade Smith (2)	Cleveland Guardians	Mason Miller (4)	San Diego Padres	
2026	June	Jacob Latz	Texas Rangers	Jhoan Durán (2)	Philadelphia Phillies	
2026	July	Aroldis Chapman (5)	Boston Red Sox	Mason Miller (5)	San Diego Padres	
2026	August	Josh Hader (9)	Houston Astros	Trevor Megill	Milwaukee Brewers	
2026	September	Cade Smith (3)	Cleveland Guardians	Mason Montgomery	Pittsburgh Pirates	

== See also ==
- Baseball awards
- List of MLB awards
