= Major League Baseball Reliever of the Year Award =

Annual award in Major League Baseball

Reliever of the Year Award
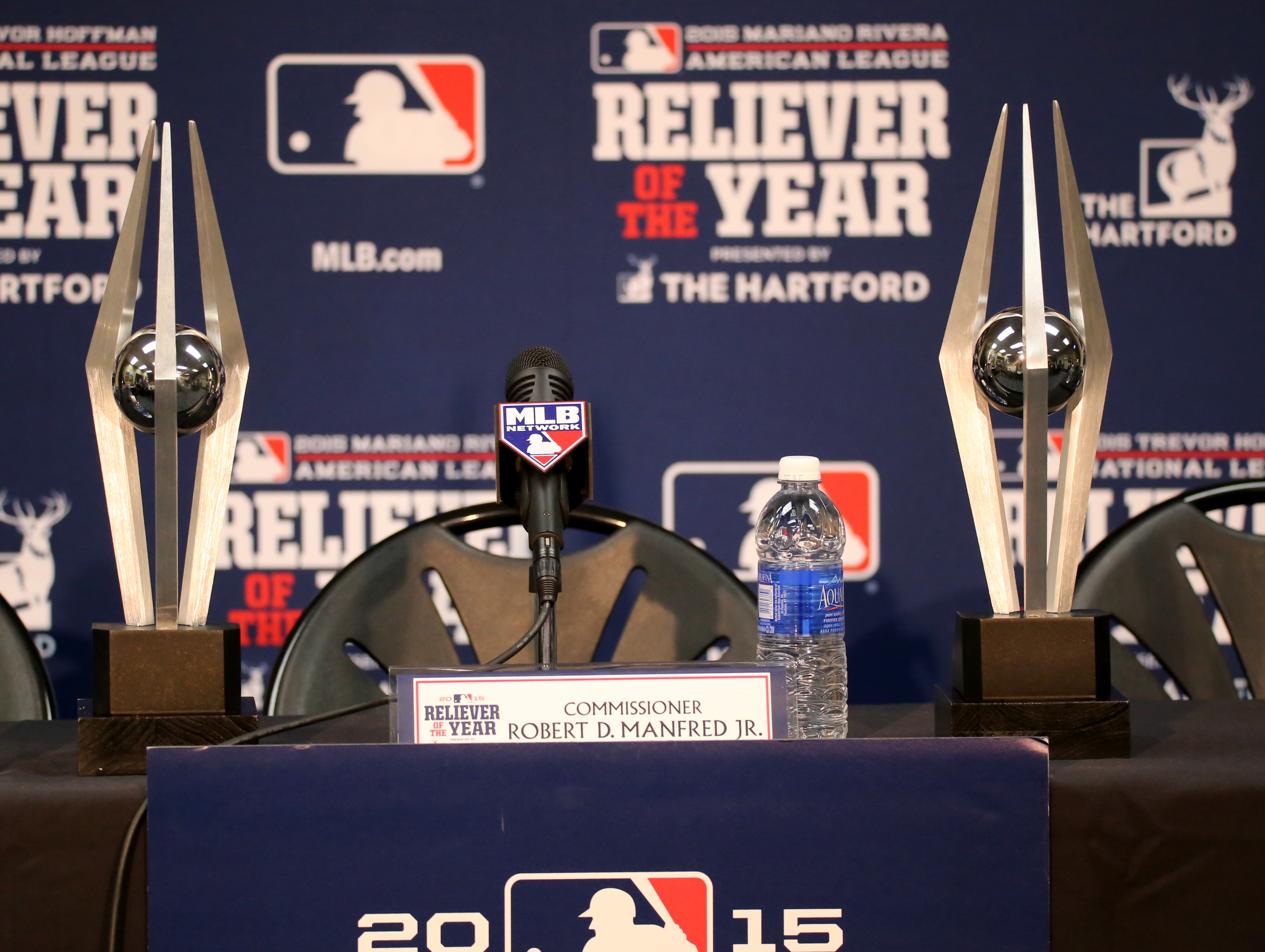
- The presentation of the trophies to the 2015 winners
- Sport: Baseball
- League: Major League Baseball
- Awarded for: Best relief pitcher in the American League and National League
- Presented by: Major League Baseball

History
- First award: 2014
- Most wins: Edwin Díaz (3 - 2 in NL, 1 in AL) and Josh Hader (3 in NL)
- Most recent: Bryan Baker (AL); Mason Miller (NL)

Major League Baseball (MLB) annually honors its best relief pitchers in the American League (AL) and National League (NL) with the Mariano Rivera AL Reliever of the Year Award and Trevor Hoffman NL Reliever of the Year Award, respectively. The awards are named after former relievers Mariano Rivera and Trevor Hoffman, who played their entire careers in the respective leagues. First issued in 2014, the awards replaced the Delivery Man of the Year Award, which had been presented since 2005.

The Reliever of the Year Awards are based on the votes of a panel of retired relievers. Each voter selects three pitchers for each league based solely on their performance in the regular season; a 5-3-1 weighted point system is used to determine the winner. At its inception in 2014, the panel consisted of the top five relievers in career saves at the time—Rivera, Hoffman, Lee Smith, John Franco, and Billy Wagner—and the four living relief pitchers who were in the Hall of Fame: Dennis Eckersley, Rollie Fingers, Goose Gossage, and Bruce Sutter.

The Reliever of the Year Award winners had all been closers until 2018, when Josh Hader of the Milwaukee Brewers won as a setup man; he later won the NL title in 2019 and 2021 as a closer. The inaugural All-MLB teams named both of the award winners in 2019. In 2020, the Brewers' Devin Williams became the first rookie and the first reliever with no saves to win the award in either league.

Since 2017, MLB has also issued a Reliever of the Month Award.

MLB's Reliever of the Year Award is distinct and separate from the same award given by the Baseball Writers' Association of America, which was first handed out at the end of the 2026 season.

== Winners ==
=== Trevor Hoffman NL Reliever of the Year ===
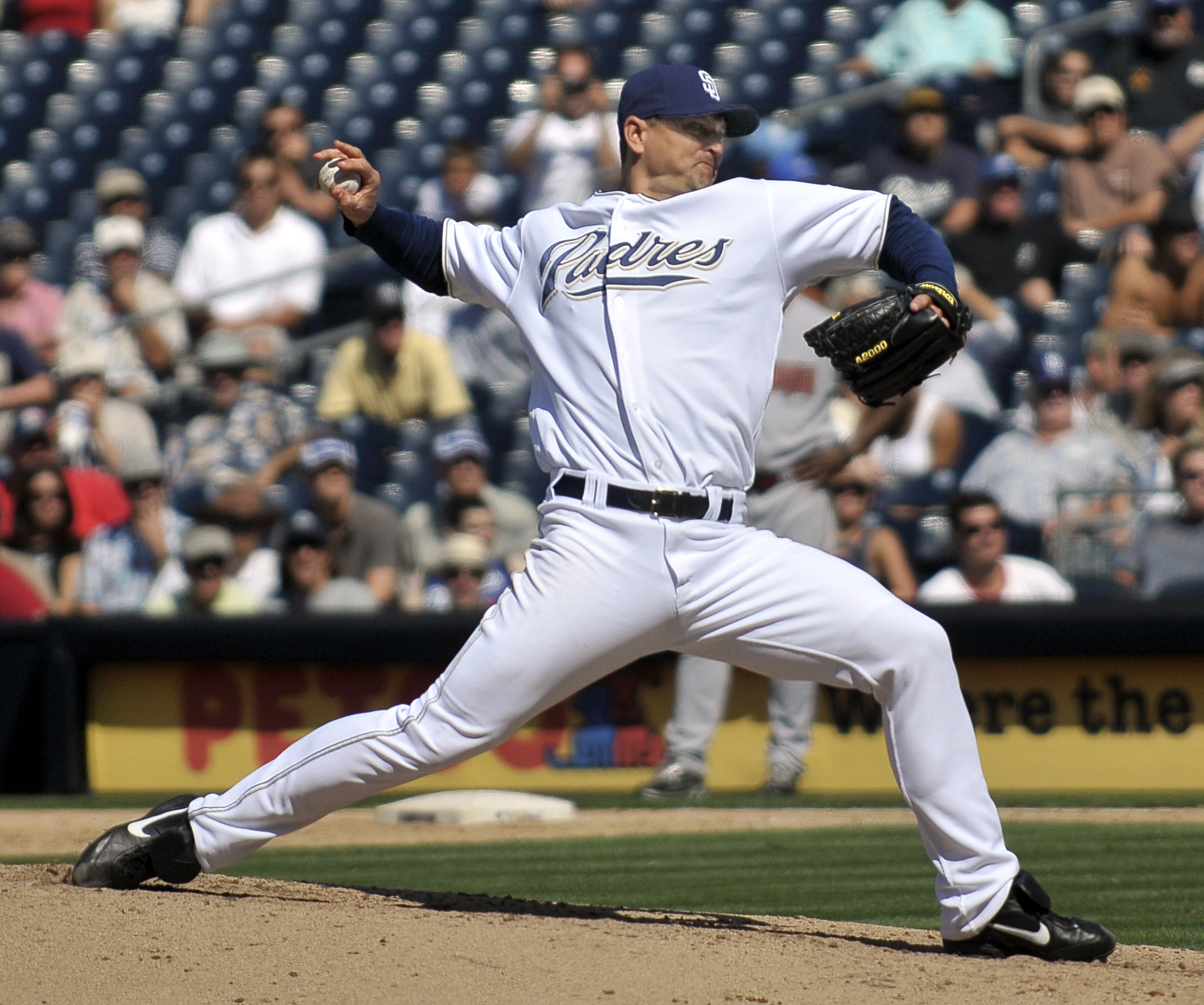
Namesake of the NL award, Trevor Hoffman

| Year | Player | Team | SV | ERA | WHIP | K | IP | Ref |
|---|---|---|---|---|---|---|---|---|
| 2014 | Craig Kimbrel | Atlanta Braves | 47 | 1.61 | 0.91 | 95 | 61 2/3 | |
| 2015 | Mark Melancon | Pittsburgh Pirates | 51 | 2.23 | 0.93 | 62 | 76 2/3 | |
| 2016 | Kenley Jansen | Los Angeles Dodgers | 47 | 1.83 | 0.67 | 104 | 68 2/3 | |
| 2017 | Kenley Jansen (2) | Los Angeles Dodgers | 41 | 1.32 | 0.75 | 109 | 68 1/3 | |
| 2018 | Josh Hader | Milwaukee Brewers | 12 | 2.43 | 0.81 | 143 | 81 1/3 | |
| 2019 | Josh Hader (2) | Milwaukee Brewers | 37 | 2.62 | 0.81 | 138 | 75 2/3 | |
| 2020 | Devin Williams | Milwaukee Brewers | 0 | 0.33 | 0.63 | 53 | 27 | |
| 2021 | Josh Hader (3) | Milwaukee Brewers | 34 | 1.23 | 0.84 | 102 | 58 2/3 | |
| 2022 | Edwin Díaz (2) | New York Mets | 32 | 1.31 | 0.839 | 118 | 62 | |
| 2023 | Devin Williams (2) | Milwaukee Brewers | 36 | 1.53 | 0.920 | 87 | 58 2/3 | |
| 2024 | Ryan Helsley | St. Louis Cardinals | 49 | 2.04 | 1.100 | 79 | 66 1/3 | |
| 2025 | Edwin Díaz (3) | New York Mets | 28 | 1.63 | 0.874 | 98 | 66 1/3 | |
| 2026 | Mason Miller | San Diego Padres | 38 | 1.67 | 0.90 | 129 | 70 | |

=== Mariano Rivera AL Reliever of the Year ===
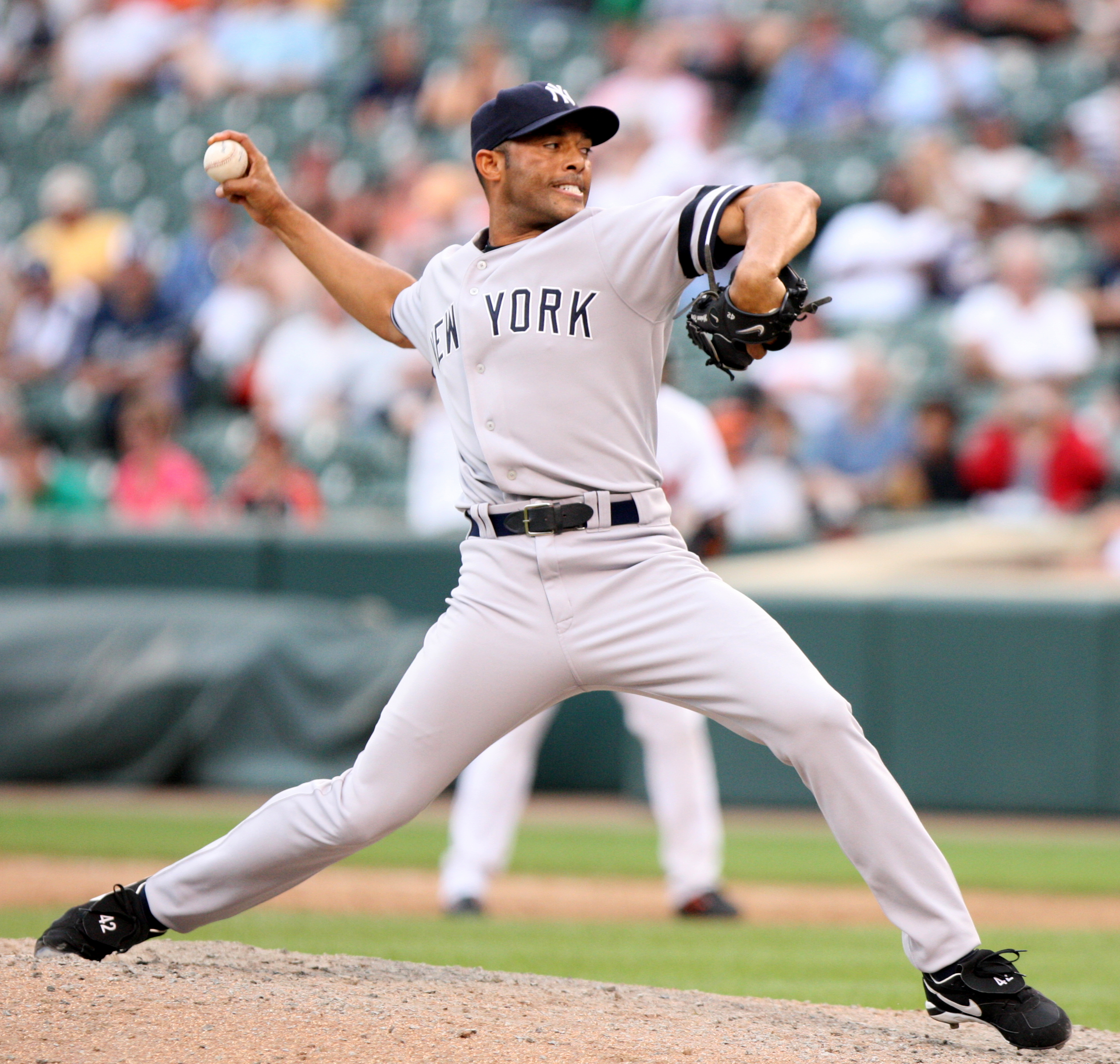
Namesake of the AL award, Mariano Rivera

| Year | Player | Team | SV | ERA | WHIP | K | IP | Ref |
|---|---|---|---|---|---|---|---|---|
| 2014 | Greg Holland | Kansas City Royals | 46 | 1.44 | 0.91 | 90 | 62 1/3 | |
| 2015 | Andrew Miller | New York Yankees | 36 | 2.04 | 0.86 | 100 | 61 2/3 | |
| 2016 | Zack Britton | Baltimore Orioles | 47 | 0.54 | 0.84 | 74 | 67 | |
| 2017 | Craig Kimbrel (2) | Boston Red Sox | 35 | 1.43 | 0.68 | 126 | 69 | |
| 2018 | Edwin Díaz | Seattle Mariners | 57 | 1.96 | 0.79 | 124 | 73 1/3 | |
| 2019 | Aroldis Chapman | New York Yankees | 37 | 2.21 | 1.11 | 85 | 57 | |
| 2020 | Liam Hendriks | Oakland Athletics | 14 | 1.78 | 0.67 | 37 | 25 1/3 | |
| 2021 | Liam Hendriks (2) | Chicago White Sox | 38 | 2.54 | 0.73 | 113 | 71 | |
| 2022 | Emmanuel Clase | Cleveland Guardians | 42 | 1.36 | 0.729 | 77 | 72 2/3 | |
| 2023 | Félix Bautista | Baltimore Orioles | 33 | 1.48 | 0.918 | 110 | 61 | |
| 2024 | Emmanuel Clase (2) | Cleveland Guardians | 47 | 0.61 | 0.660 | 66 | 74 1/3 | |
| 2025 | Aroldis Chapman (2) | Boston Red Sox | 32 | 1.17 | 0.701 | 85 | 61 1/3 | |
| 2026 | Bryan Baker | Tampa Bay Rays | 41 | 1.44 | 0.91 | 63 | 62 1/3 | |

== See also ==
- Baseball Writers' Association of America Relief Pitcher of the Year Award
- Sporting News Relief Pitcher of the Year Award (2013–present; one in each league)
- Sporting News Reliever of the Year Award (1960–2010; one in each league)
- Rolaids Relief Man Award (1976–2012; one in each league)
- Baseball awards
- List of MLB awards
