= List of Major League Baseball career saves leaders =

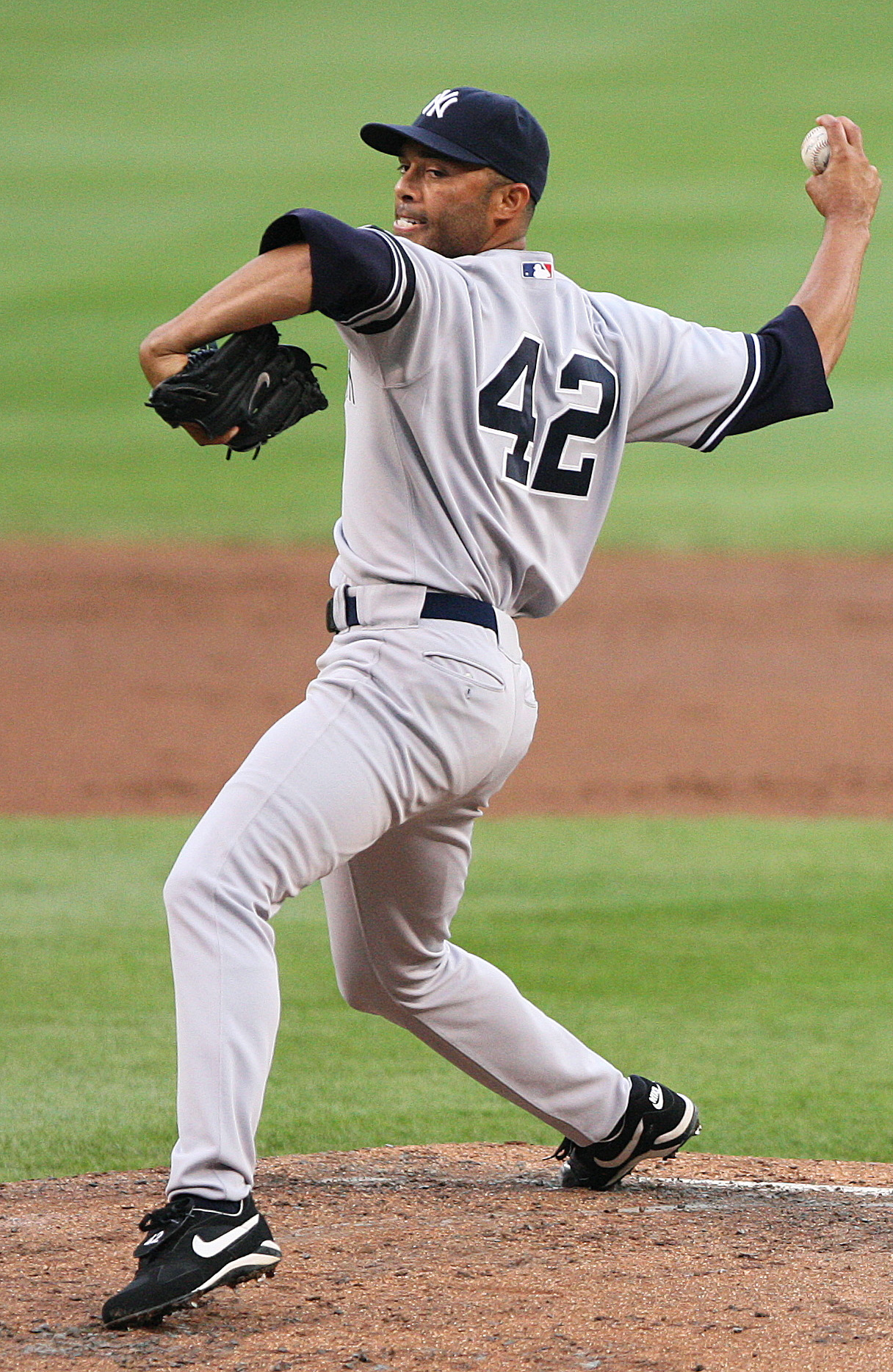
Mariano Rivera, the all-time leader in saves.

In baseball statistics, a relief pitcher is credited with a save (denoted by SV) who finishes a game for the winning team under certain prescribed circumstances. Most commonly a pitcher earns a save by entering in the ninth inning of a game in which his team is winning by three or fewer runs and finishing the game by pitching one inning without losing the lead.

Mariano Rivera is the all-time leader in saves with 652. Rivera and Trevor Hoffman are the only pitchers in MLB history to save more than 600 career games. Kenley Jansen, Lee Smith, Craig Kimbrel, Francisco Rodríguez, John Franco, Billy Wagner, and Aroldis Chapman are the only other pitchers to save more than 400 games in their careers.

== Key ==
**Rank**	Rank amongst leaders in career saves. A blank field indicates a tie.
**Player (2026 SV)**	Number of saves during the 2026 Major League Baseball season
**SV**	Total career saves
*	Denotes elected to National Baseball Hall of Fame.
**Bold**	Denotes active player. (Note: A player is considered inactive if he has announced his retirement or has not played for a full season.)

== List ==
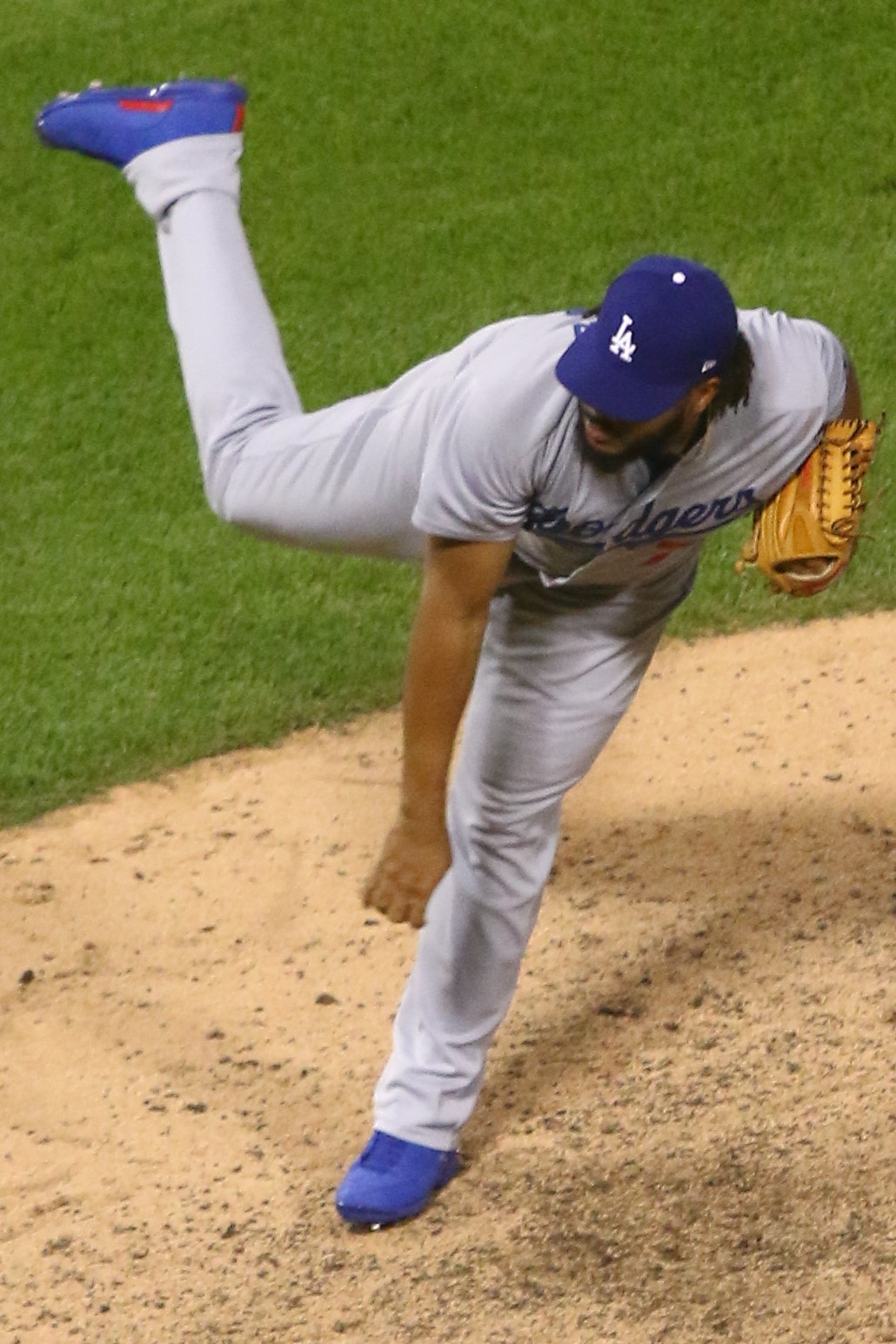
Kenley Jansen is the active leader in career saves and 3rd all-time. He is also 1 of 3 active players with 400 or more saves.

- Stats updated as of September 25, 2026.

Rank	Player (2026 SV)	SV
1	Mariano Rivera*	652
2	Trevor Hoffman*	601
3	**Kenley Jansen (22)**	498
4	Lee Smith*	478
5	**Craig Kimbrel (1)**	441
6	Francisco Rodríguez	437
7	John Franco	424
8	Billy Wagner*	422
9	**Aroldis Chapman (35)**	402
10	Dennis Eckersley*	390
11	Joe Nathan	377
12	Jonathan Papelbon	368
13	Jeff Reardon	367
14	Troy Percival	358
15	Randy Myers	347
16	Rollie Fingers*	341
17	John Wetteland	330
18	Francisco Cordero	329
19	Fernando Rodney	327
20	Roberto Hernández	326
21	Huston Street	324
22	José Mesa	321
23	Todd Jones	319
24	Rick Aguilera	318
25	Robb Nen	314
26	Tom Henke	311
27	Goose Gossage*	310
28	Jeff Montgomery	304
29	Doug Jones	303
30	Jason Isringhausen	300
	Bruce Sutter*	300
32	Armando Benítez	289
33	José Valverde	288
34	**Raisel Iglesias (34)**	287
35	Rod Beck	286
36	Bob Wickman	267
37	Mark Melancon	262
38	**Edwin Díaz (7)**	260
39	Todd Worrell	256
40	**Josh Hader (26)**	253
41	Dave Righetti	252
42	Dan Quisenberry	244
43	Sparky Lyle	238
44	Ugueth Urbina	237
45	Joakim Soria	229
46	Hoyt Wilhelm*	228
47	Brad Lidge	225
48	Greg Holland	220
49	Gene Garber	218
50	Gregg Olson	217

Rank	Player (2026 SV)	SV
51	Dave Smith	216
52	Rafael Soriano	207
53	Brian Fuentes	204
54	Jeff Shaw	203
55	Bobby Thigpen	201
56	Mike Henneman	193
57	Mitch Williams	192
58	Roy Face	191
	Keith Foulke	191
60	J. J. Putz	189
61	Mike Marshall	188
62	Éric Gagné	187
	Eddie Guardado	187
64	Jeff Russell	186
65	Steve Bedrosian	184
	Kent Tekulve	184
67	**Emmanuel Clase (0)**	182
	Danny Graves	182
69	Tug McGraw	180
70	David Robertson	179
71	Jim Johnson	178
	Ron Perranoski	178
73	Kevin Gregg	177
	Bryan Harvey	177
75	Lindy McDaniel	174
76	Bobby Jenks	173
77	Jeff Brantley	172
	Brian Wilson	172
79	Heath Bell	168
80	Billy Koch	163
81	Alex Colomé	159
	Roger McDowell	159
83	Tom Gordon	158
	Dan Plesac	158
85	Jay Howell	155
	Roberto Osuna	155
87	Zack Britton	154
	John Smoltz*	154
89	Cody Allen	153
	Stu Miller	153
91	Don McMahon	152
92	Greg Minton	150
93	Ted Abernathy	149
94	Willie Hernández	147
95	**David Bednar (35)**	146
96	Dave Giusti	145
97	John Axford	144
	Santiago Casilla	144
	Jesse Orosco	144
	Mike Williams	144
