= Edwin Díaz =

Puerto Rican baseball player (born 1994)

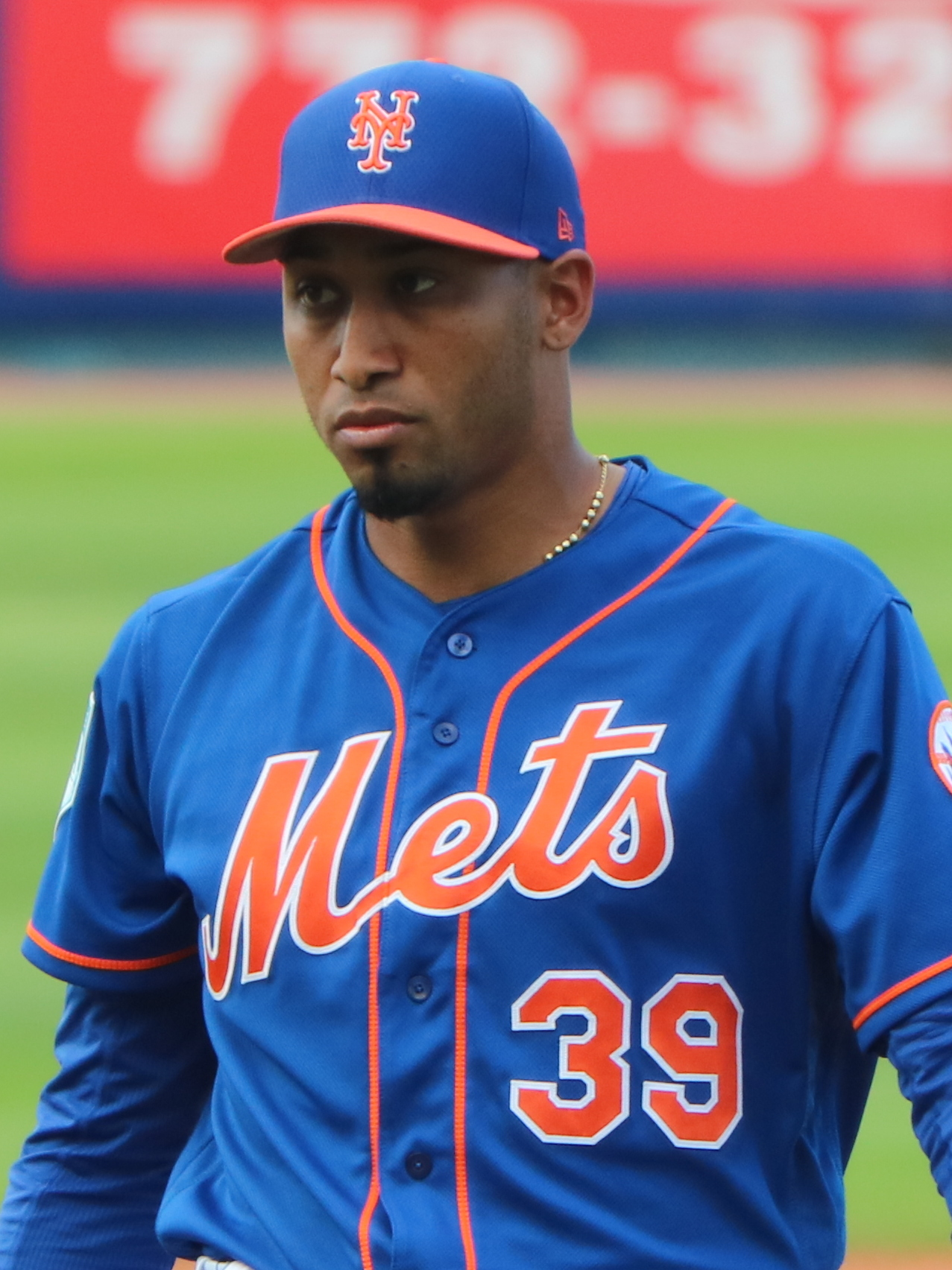
- Díaz with the New York Mets in 2019

Los Angeles Dodgers – No. 3
- Pitcher
- Born: March 22, 1994 (age 32); Naguabo, Puerto Rico
- Bats: Right Throws: Right

MLB debut
- June 6, 2016, for the Seattle Mariners

MLB statistics (through 2026 season)
- Win–loss record: 30–38
- Earned run average: 3.03
- Strikeouts: 867
- Saves: 260
- Stats at Baseball Reference

Teams
- Seattle Mariners (2016–2018); New York Mets (2019–2022, 2024–2025); Los Angeles Dodgers (2026–present)

Career highlights and awards
- 3× All-Star (2018, 2022, 2025); All-MLB First Team (2022); 3× Reliever of the Year (2018, 2022, 2025); AL saves leader (2018); Pitched a combined no-hitter on April 29, 2022
Medals
Men's baseball
Representing Puerto Rico
World Baseball Classic
Silver medal – second place	2017 Los Angeles	National team

Edwin Orlando Díaz Laboy (born March 22, 1994) is a Puerto Rican professional baseball pitcher for the Los Angeles Dodgers of Major League Baseball (MLB). He has previously played in MLB for the Seattle Mariners and New York Mets. Díaz was selected by the Mariners in the third round of the 2012 MLB draft and made his MLB debut with them in 2016.

One month after his MLB debut, Díaz set a Mariners franchise record by recording 11 consecutive outs via strikeout. He surpassed Hall of Famer Randy Johnson's previous franchise record of 10, set in 1997. Díaz was subsequently named the team's closer. After recording 18 saves, he finished fifth in the American League (AL) Rookie of the Year voting in 2016. In 2018, Díaz earned his first All-Star selection and won the AL Reliever of the Year Award after leading MLB with 57 saves. Following that season, the Mariners traded him to the Mets, where he played until 2025. During his tenure with the Mets, he earned two additional All-Star selections, won the National League (NL) Reliever of the Year Award twice, and was named to the All-MLB Team twice, all in 2022 and 2025. Díaz currently leads the league in Reliever of the Month honors.

== Early life ==
Díaz grew up in the Daguao barrio of Naguabo, Puerto Rico. He began playing baseball around age seven, primarily as a center fielder. During his youth in Puerto Rico, Díaz played as an outfielder alongside players such as Carlos Correa and José Berríos. At the insistence of his father, he reluctantly tried pitching as a teenager.

== Professional career ==
=== Seattle Mariners (2012–2018) ===
==== Draft and minor leagues (2012–2016) ====
Díaz was selected by the Seattle Mariners as the 98th overall pick in the third round of the 2012 MLB draft from Caguas Military Academy in Caguas, Puerto Rico. He made his professional debut that season with the AZL Mariners. He played in nine games, including one start, compiling a 2–1 record with a 5.21 earned run average (ERA) and 20 strikeouts over 19 innings pitched. In 2013, he pitched for the Pulaski Mariners. In 13 starts, he went 5–2 with a 1.43 ERA and 79 strikeouts over 69 innings. Prior to the 2014 season, Díaz was named the Mariners fifth-best prospect by Baseball America. He spent the season with the Clinton LumberKings and was co-selected the organization's minor league starting pitcher of the year along Jordan Pries. Díaz was 6–8 with a 3.33 ERA in 24 starts.

In 2015, Díaz played for the Bakersfield Blaze and Jackson Generals, pitching to a combined 7–10 record and 3.82 ERA in 27 starts. That year, he was selected as minor league Starting Pitcher of the Year for the second consecutive season. Díaz started 2016 with Jackson as a starting pitcher and was moved to the bullpen after six starts. He pitched 40 2/3 innings over 16 games with a 3–3 record and 2.21 ERA.

==== 2016–2017 ====
Díaz was called up to the majors on June 4, 2016. In his debut game two days later, he retired all three batters he faced against the Cleveland Indians and picked up his first MLB strikeout against Tyler Naquin. Between June 28 and July 3, he recorded ten consecutive outs via strikeout, tying a franchise record set in 1997. On July 6, Díaz broke the record with his 11th consecutive out via strikeout.

On August 1, Díaz replaced Steve Cishek as the Mariners' closer. He recorded the first save of his career the following day, in a 5–4 win over the Boston Red Sox, in which he struck out the side. By reaching his 50th strikeout in only 25 1/3 innings, Díaz became the first pitcher to do so in at least 123 years. He finished the season with a 6–3 record, 1.63 ERA, 98 strikeouts and 28 saves in 66 1/3 innings over 62 games.

In 2017, Díaz appeared in 66 games, posting a 4–6 record to go along with a 3.27 earned run average and 89 strikeouts in 66 innings pitched, converting 34 of 39 save opportunities.

==== 2018: AL saves record ====
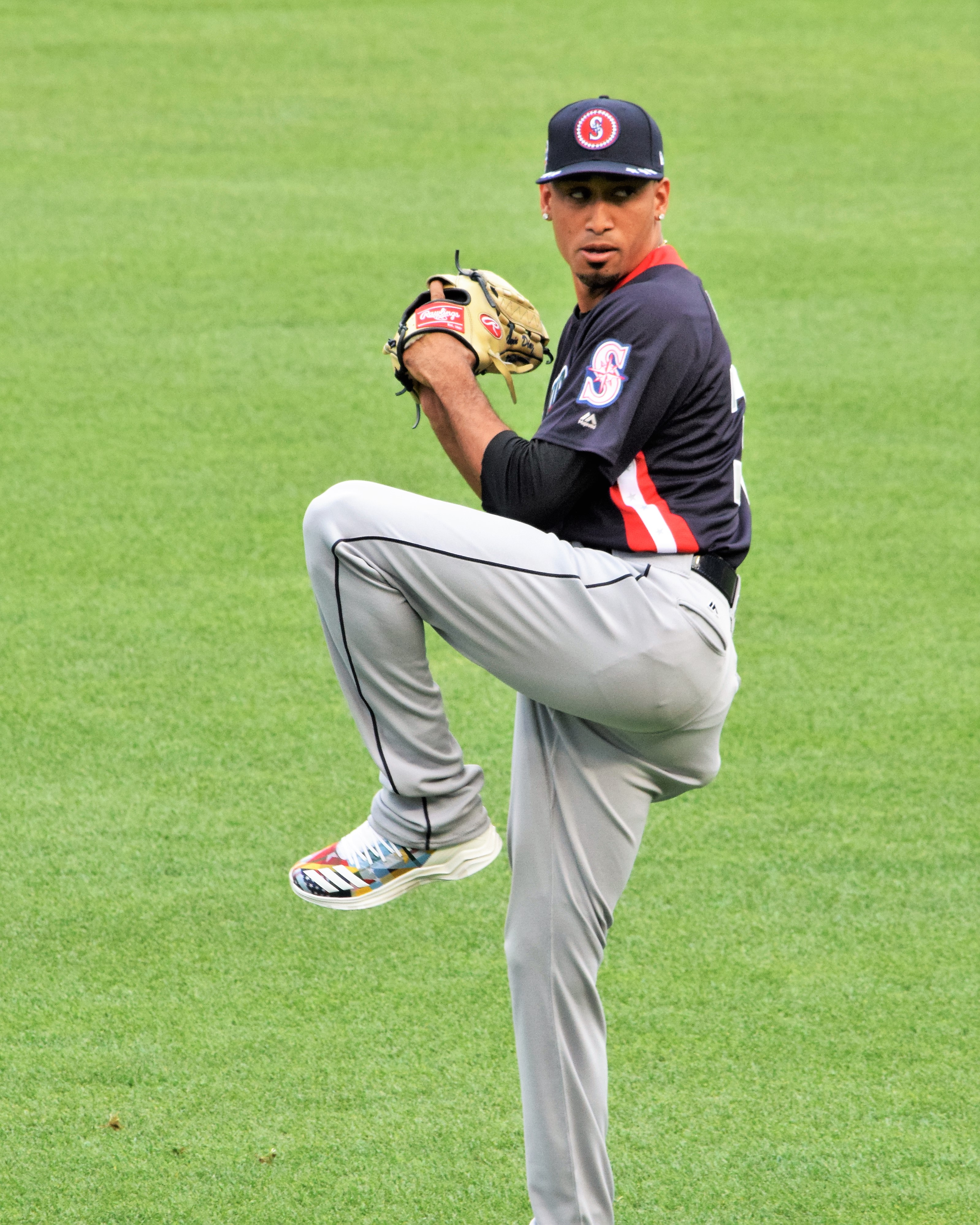
Díaz warming up before the 2018 All-Star Game

Owning a 2.25 ERA, 36 saves, and 76 strikeouts in 48 innings, Díaz was named to the All-Star Game, his first All-Star appearance. He became the holder of the Seattle Mariners club record for saves before the All-Star break, finishing with 36 saves before the break. The previous club record was 29 saves by Kazuhiro Sasaki 2001. In the All-Star Game, Díaz was the winning pitcher even though he also had a blown save in the process as the National League (NL) team tied the game in the 9th inning. He ended up with two strikeouts and two earned runs including a home run in one inning pitched. Díaz received the AL Reliever of the Month Award for April, June, and July. On August 10, Díaz recorded his 44th save, breaking the record for most saves by a Puerto Rican player, previously set by Roberto Hernández with 43 in 1999.

With a win on August 12 against the Houston Astros, the Mariners were 26–0 when Díaz was handed a one-run lead. In those games, Díaz had 24 saves, a 0.68 ERA, 13 hits allowed, 2 earned runs, 5 walks, and 49 strikeouts in 26 1/3 innings. Also, with the save on August 12 (his 46th of the season), Díaz became the first pitcher to record four saves in a single series since 2004 as Seattle completed a four-game sweep of the Astros.

"I got a welcomed call from our closer. He said, 'If we got the lead, I'm in the game.' Sometimes you've got to do that. That's kind of how Eddie's wired and how this team is wired."

— Mariners manager Scott Servais, in regard to Díaz wanting to play his fourth consecutive game

Díaz's 24 saves when entering a game with a one-run lead broke the record for most in a season, which had been 23, set by Francisco Rodríguez for the Los Angeles Angels of Anaheim in 2008. His 46th save of the season was part of 27 consecutive successful save opportunities; he had a 0.39 ERA in games that he had saved during the season. On August 24, Díaz notched his 49th save of the season, setting a Mariners single-season record when he closed out a 6–3 win over the Arizona Diamondbacks. The previous Mariners franchise single-season saves record was 48, by Fernando Rodney in 2014. On August 25, Díaz became the youngest pitcher to collect 50 saves in a season when he closed a 4–3 victory over the Diamondbacks. The 50 saves meant that Seattle manager Servais had to follow through on a bet and get a haircut like that of Díaz. Díaz, who usually keeps the ball after each of his saves, gave that game ball to Servais in honor of the bet.

On October 27, Díaz was awarded the AL Reliever of the Year award. He finished the season with 57 saves (leading the major leagues) and 65 games finished to go with a 1.96 ERA, 124 strikeouts, and a 0.79 WHIP in 73 1/3 innings. His 57 saves tied with Bobby Thigpen for second-most in an MLB season.

=== New York Mets (2019–2025) ===
==== 2019 ====
On December 3, 2018, the Mariners traded Díaz, Robinson Canó, and $20 million to the New York Mets for Jay Bruce, Jarred Kelenic, Anthony Swarzak, Gerson Bautista, and Justin Dunn.

Díaz recorded his first save as a Met on Opening Day against the Washington Nationals in 2019. In the first half of the season, Díaz surrendered more than twice as many hits per nine innings as in the 2018 season and his ERA+ dropped from 210 in 2018 to 74 in the first half of the 2019 campaign. Writing for Deadspin, David Roth described Díaz's downturn as "arguably the most dramatic and most surprising" of any player's collapse to that point in the MLB season.

On September 26, Díaz allowed his 15th ninth-inning home run of the season, the most ninth-inning home runs given up by a pitcher in one MLB season. He finished the season with 58 innings pitched, 26 saves, and a 5.59 ERA.

==== 2020–2021 ====
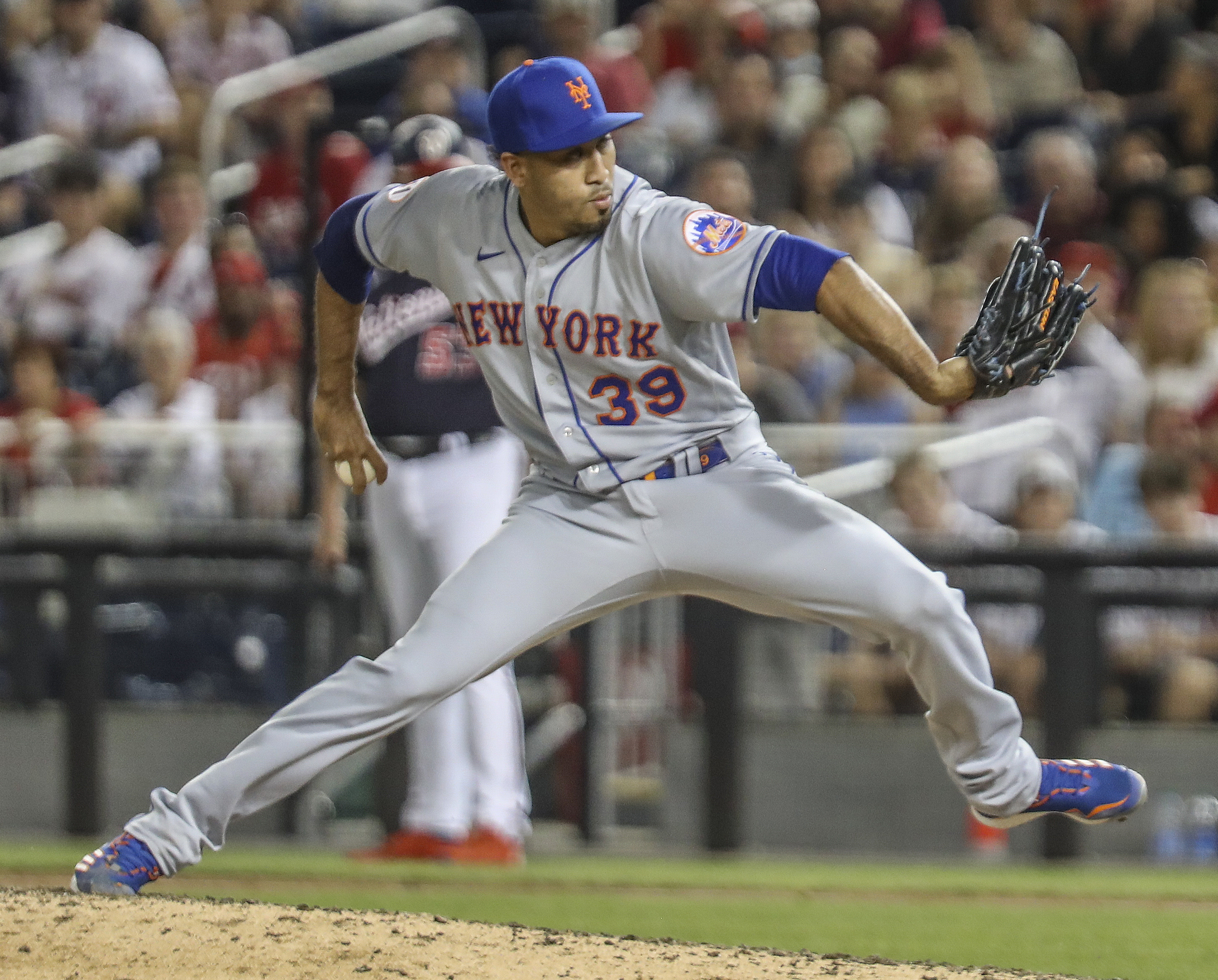
Díaz with the Mets in 2021

In the pandemic-shortened 2020 season, Díaz converted six of ten save opportunities and recorded a 1.75 ERA with 50 strikeouts and 14 walks in 25 2/3 innings.

In 2021, Díaz appeared in 63 games, posting a 5–6 record, a 3.45 ERA, and 89 strikeouts in 62 2/3 innings pitched, converting 32 of 38 save opportunities.

==== 2022: NL Reliever of the Year ====
On April 29, 2022, Díaz pitched in relief in a combined no-hitter against the Philadelphia Phillies, pitching the final inning and earning the save. He earned NL Reliever of the Month honors in June, allowing one run in 9 2/3 innings, converting all five save opportunities and allowing a 0.93 WHIP.

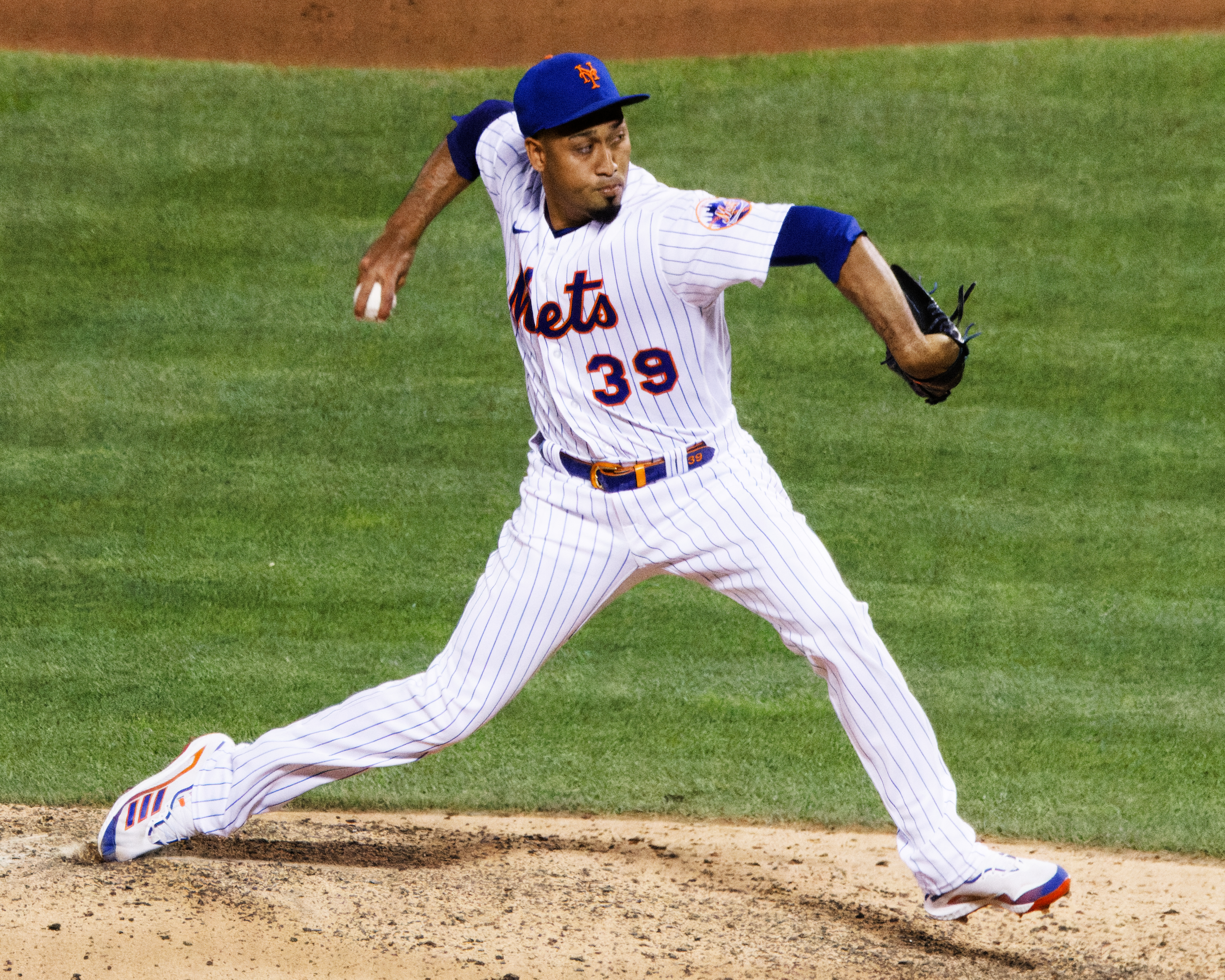
Díaz with the Mets in 2022

On July 10, Díaz was named an All-Star for the second time in his career. He entered the All-Star break with 20 saves in 23 save opportunities and a 1.69 ERA. He struck out 75 of the 145 batters he faced in the first half of the season. Díaz closed out the ninth inning of a 1–0 win over Philadelphia on August 13 to earn his 200th career save, the sixth active player to do so. He issued two walks during that game, ending a streak of 50 batters faced without a walk. Díaz finished the season with 32 saves, 118 strikeouts, and a 1.31 ERA, a career-best.

On November 9, Díaz signed a five-year, $102 million contract with the Mets, the most valuable contract ever signed by a relief pitcher. The contract had an opt-out after the third year, which he later exercised. On December 6, Díaz was named the NL Reliever of the Year. He was also named to the All-MLB First Team.

==== 2023: WBC injury ====
On March 15, 2023, after striking out the side in the ninth inning against the Dominican Republic, sending Puerto Rico to the World Baseball Classic quarterfinals, Díaz suffered an injury to his right knee during the celebration and had to be helped off the field. On March 16, the Mets announced that he would undergo surgery to repair a full-thickness tear of his patellar tendon and would miss roughly 8 months in recovery. On September 18, the Mets announced that Díaz would not pitch for the team in 2023, not wanting to jeopardize his health to rush him back during a likely losing season.

==== 2024 ====
On April 15, 2024, Díaz recorded his 100th save for the Mets in a 6–3 home victory over the Pittsburgh Pirates. Following a blown four-run lead on May 18 against the Miami Marlins as well as other blown saves in that timeframe, he was temporarily moved from the closer's role. However, Díaz returned as closer on May 25, blowing another save against the San Francisco Giants. On May 29, he was placed on the 15-day injured list due to right shoulder impingement. He was activated from the IL and returned to the closer role on June 13 against the Marlins and earned the win that day for the Mets.

On June 23, he was ejected from a game against the Chicago Cubs because of a sticky substance on his hands. The next day, Díaz was given a 10-day suspension by the MLB for violating the league's foreign substance policy. He returned from his suspension on July 6 and recorded his 8th save of the season in a 5–2 victory against the Pirates. On September 30, in the penultimate game of the season, Díaz threw a season-high 40 pitches across the 8th and 9th innings against the Atlanta Braves, securing the win and clinching the 11th playoff berth in Mets history. Díaz finished the season with 20 saves, 84 strikeouts, a 3.52 ERA, and a career-high 6 wins.

On October 3, Díaz recorded his first postseason win after throwing two scoreless innings in Game 3 of the NL Wild Card Series against the Milwaukee Brewers. He recorded his first postseason save on October 9 in Game 4 of the NL Division Series against the Philadelphia Phillies, clinching the series and a spot in the NL Championship Series for the Mets. Across six games of the postseason, Díaz recorded one win, two saves, and 13 strikeouts with a 3.12 ERA.

==== 2025: Second NL Reliever of the Year ====
Díaz had a stretch in May 2025 in which batters hit 0-for-30 against him. This performance was part of a dominant month for the Mets' closer, where he recorded 5 saves and pitched 11 1/3 scoreless innings, allowing only 3 hits, 4 walks, and striking out 14 batters. On June 3, Díaz was named the NL Reliever of the Month for May for his performance. However, one day prior, he blew his first save of the season against the Los Angeles Dodgers, although he still earned the win as the Mets defeated the Dodgers 4–3 in extra innings.

On July 6, Díaz was named to the All-Star Game, the third selection of his career, after posting a 1.80 ERA with 4 wins, 18 saves, and 53 strikeouts across 35 games. In the All-Star Game, Díaz pitched in the 9th inning where he allowed one hit and struck out Randy Arozarena. He was named the NL Reliever of the Month for July as he recorded 7 saves and pitched 11 innings, allowing only 4 hits, 4 walks, and striking out 18 batters. This marked the 10th time Díaz was awarded Reliever of the Month in his career, five times in the AL and five times in the NL, more than any other pitcher in the award's history.

On September 1, Díaz recorded his 250th save as the Mets defeated the Detroit Tigers in a 10–8 victory.

Díaz finished the season with a 1.63 ERA, 0.87 WHIP, and 98 strikeouts in 62 appearances, along with 28 saves. On November 13, Díaz was named the NL Reliever of the Year. He was also named to the All-MLB Second Team. After the season, he opted out of his contract with the Mets and became a free agent.

=== Los Angeles Dodgers (2026–present) ===
On December 12, 2025, Díaz signed a three-year, $69 million contract with the Los Angeles Dodgers.

==== 2026 ====
On March 27, 2026, Díaz earned his first save with the Dodgers after closing out a 5–4 win over the Arizona Diamondbacks. After going 4-for-4 in save opportunities, Díaz began to struggle, posting a 10.50 ERA over his first seven appearances, and was ultimately placed on the injured list on April 20 due to loose bodies in his right elbow. He was activated on July 29, but was hit even harder, continuing his Dodgers tenure with a 13.50 ERA, and was again placed the 15-day injured list due to neck inflammation. He was activated again on September 18 and was used in a lower leverage role the rest of the season. He did not allow any runs in five appearances in September and earned a chance to close again in the postseason. During an injury riddled 2026 season, Díaz pitched 18 2/3 innings across 21 games while recording an 8.68 ERA with seven saves and 28 strikeouts.

Across four games and six innings of the 2026 postseason, Díaz recorded a 1.50 ERA with two saves and five strikeouts, though the Dodgers were ultimately swept in the NL Championship Series.

== International career ==
Díaz was a closer for the Puerto Rican national team in the 2017 World Baseball Classic (WBC) where he won a silver medal. He had two saves at the tournament: one against the Dominican Republic and another against the United States, both in the second round. In the semifinal against the Netherlands, he won the game as Puerto Rico scored in the bottom of the 11th inning for a 4–3 win.

During the 2023 WBC, Díaz pitched the seventh inning of an ongoing perfect game versus Israel, which ended by a 10–0 score on a walk-off hit in the bottom of the eighth inning that invoked the tournament's mercy rule. However, it did not qualify as an official perfect game per the Elias Sports Bureau, due to lasting fewer than nine innings. Díaz also closed the final pool play game against the Dominican Republic, sending Puerto Rico to the quarterfinals. However, immediately after the game, he suffered an injury to his right knee during the celebration that ended his participation in the tournament and causing him to miss the 2023 MLB season. Puerto Rico was eliminated in their next game against Mexico. For the tournament, Díaz had a perfect 0.00 ERA with four strikeouts over two innings of work.

Díaz pitched in three games for Puerto Rico in the 2026 WBC, again allowing no runs and earning one save.

== Player profile ==
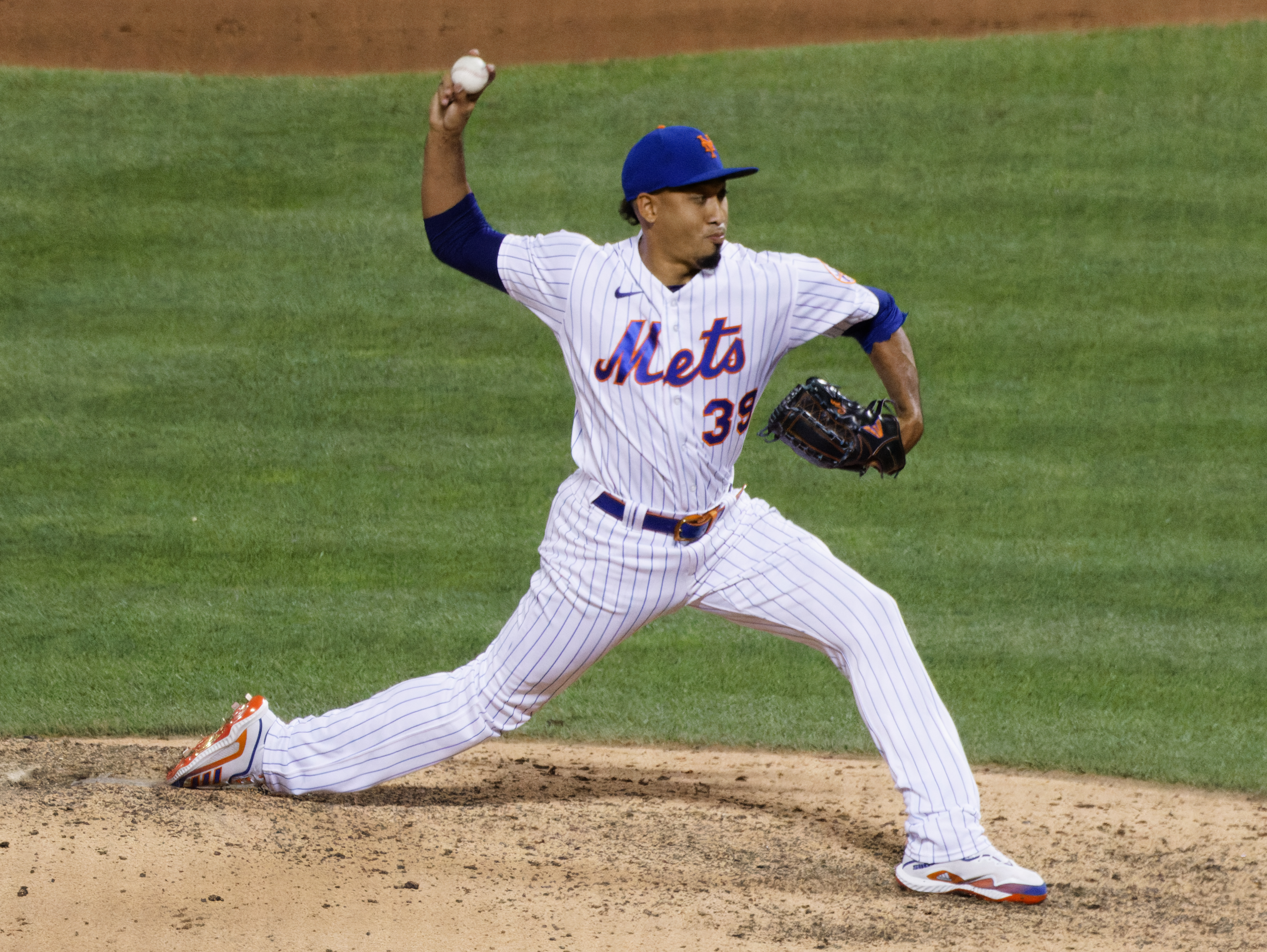
Díaz pitching for the Mets in 2022

With a sidearm delivery, Díaz throws three pitches. His most common pitch is a hard four-seam fastball (60% usage) that has averaged 97.7 miles per hour (157.2 km/h) in his first nine MLB seasons. His breaking ball is a slider (40%) at an average 89.4 miles per hour (143.9 km/h). He also has a changeup that he uses very rarely.

Díaz has been a strikeout pitcher, compiling an average of 14.5 strikeouts per nine innings pitched through March 2026, which is one of highest rates for a reliever in major league history.

Díaz is known for his walk-up song, "Narco" by Blasterjaxx and Timmy Trumpet.

== Personal life ==
In the offseason, Díaz spends time in his native Daguao in the Naguabo Municipality in Puerto Rico, where most of his family lives. Díaz has organized baseball clinics for the children in his hometown as part of his Edwin Díaz Baseball Academy. Robinson Canó and Martín Maldonado have attended these clinics.

Díaz's nickname, "Sugar," was given to him by teammates in school who believed he resembled the fictional star pitcher Miguel "Sugar" Santos in the 2008 film Sugar.

Díaz's younger brother, Alexis Díaz, has also pitched in MLB. Alexis's first save, on May 17, 2022, made them the third set of brothers to both earn an MLB save on the same day.

== See also ==
- Baseball in Puerto Rico
- List of Major League Baseball career saves leaders
- List of Major League Baseball no-hitters
- List of Major League Baseball players from Puerto Rico
- List of New York Mets no-hitters
- List of Puerto Ricans
- List of Seattle Mariners team records
- Most saves in a single season
- New York Mets award winners and league leaders
- Seattle Mariners award winners and league leaders

Awards and achievements
Preceded by Corbin Burnes; Josh Hader	No-hitter pitcher April 29, 2022 (with Tylor Megill, Drew Smith, Joely Rodríguez & Seth Lugo)	Succeeded by Reid Detmers
Preceded by Roberto Osuna; Aroldis Chapman; Blake Treinen	American League Reliever of the Month; June 2017; April 2018; June—August 2018	Succeeded by Alex Colomé; Blake Treinen; Blake Treinen
Preceded by David Bednar	National League Reliever of the Month; June—August 2022	Succeeded by Camilo Doval
Preceded by Robert Suárez	National League Reliever of the Month; May 2025	Succeeded by David Bednar
Preceded by David Bednar	National League Reliever of the Month; July 2025	Succeeded by Raisel Iglesias
