= Aroldis Chapman =

Cuban-American baseball player (born 1988)

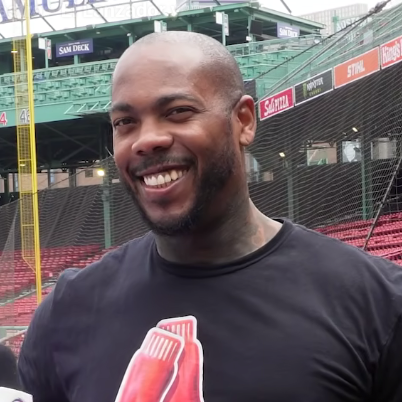
- Chapman with the Boston Red Sox in 2026

Boston Red Sox – No. 44
- Pitcher
- Born: February 28, 1988 (age 38); Holguín, Cuba
- Bats: Left Throws: Left

MLB debut
- August 31, 2010, for the Cincinnati Reds

MLB statistics (through 2026 season)
- Win–loss record: 63–52
- Earned run average: 2.48
- Strikeouts: 1,402
- Saves: 402
- Stats at Baseball Reference

Teams
- Cincinnati Reds (2010–2015); New York Yankees (2016); Chicago Cubs (2016); New York Yankees (2017–2022); Kansas City Royals (2023); Texas Rangers (2023); Pittsburgh Pirates (2024); Boston Red Sox (2025–present)

Career highlights and awards
- 9× All-Star (2012–2015, 2018, 2019, 2021, 2025, 2026); 2× World Series champion (2016, 2023); All-MLB First Team (2025); 2× AL Reliever of the Year (2019, 2025); MLB records: Most career strikeouts in MLB history as a relief pitcher; Fastest pitch in MLB history – 105.8 miles per hour (170.3 km/h); Most consecutive relief appearances with a strikeout (49)
Medals
Men's baseball
Representing Cuba
Pan American Games
Gold medal – first place	2007 Rio de Janeiro	Team
Baseball World Cup
Silver medal – second place	2007 Taipei	Team

Albertín Aroldis Chapman de la Cruz (Spanish: [aˈɾoldis ˈtʃaβman]; born February 28, 1988) is a Cuban-born American professional baseball relief pitcher for the Boston Red Sox of Major League Baseball (MLB). He has previously played in MLB for the Cincinnati Reds, New York Yankees, Chicago Cubs, Kansas City Royals, Texas Rangers, and Pittsburgh Pirates and in the Cuban National Series for Holguín. Chapman bats and throws left-handed, and is nicknamed "the Cuban Missile", due to his high fastball velocity. A member of the 400 save club, Chapman is the all-time career leader in strikeouts for relievers.

Chapman pitched for Holguín domestically and internationally for the Cuba national baseball team. He defected from Cuba in 2009 and signed a contract with the Reds in 2010. Chapman made his MLB debut that season. He won the MLB Delivery Man of the Month Award as the best relief pitcher for July 2012, was named to four straight National League All-Star teams from 2012 to 2015. The Reds traded Chapman to the Yankees after the 2015 season, and the Yankees traded Chapman to the Cubs during the 2016 season. With the Cubs, Chapman won Game 7 of the 2016 World Series. He rejoined the Yankees after the 2016 season. He was named an All-Star three times with the Yankees and was named the AL Reliever of the Year in 2019. Following six seasons with New York, Chapman signed a one-year deal with the Royals before being traded to the Rangers at the trade deadline, winning the 2023 World Series with the team for his second championship. Chapman played a year with the Pirates in 2024 and signed with the Red Sox in 2025, where he was named to his eighth and ninth All-Star Game.

On July 11, 2014, Chapman broke the record, previously held by Bruce Sutter, for the most consecutive relief appearances with a strikeout, having struck out at least one batter in 40 consecutive appearances. Chapman's streak began on August 21, 2013, and lasted 49 consecutive games over two seasons, with the 49th and final game being on August 13, 2014. Chapman currently has the record for the fastest recorded pitch speed in MLB history, at 105.8 miles per hour (170.3 km/h), as well as the Guinness World Record for fastest baseball pitch.

== Early life ==
Albertín Aroldis Chapman de la Cruz was born on February 28, 1988, in Holguín, Cuba. He lived in a three-room house with his parents and two sisters. Chapman's father was a boxing trainer and then later worked for the city. His mother did not work outside the home. Chapman's paternal grandparents had emigrated from Jamaica to Cuba in order to get a better education. The Chapmans, whose last name can be traced to English settlers in Jamaica in the late 1600s, were not a prominent family.

A friend of Chapman invited him to join a local baseball team at the age of 15. He began playing as a first baseman until the coach noticed that Chapman could throw well enough to become a pitcher, which Chapman began in 2003.

== Professional career ==
=== Cuban career ===
Chapman joined the Holguín Sabuesos of the Cuban National Series League for the 2005–06 season and played through the 2008–09 season. In 327 2/3 career innings, Chapman compiled a 24–19 win–loss record, a 3.74 earned run average (ERA), and 365 strikeouts. For the 2008–09 season, he compiled a 11–4 record with a 4.03 ERA, 130 strikeouts, and 118 1/3 innings pitched. He was used mainly as a starting pitcher during his time with the Sabuesos, although he made 11 relief appearances in the 2007 season, where he compiled seven saves.

=== Defection and American career ===
After a failed attempt to defect in the spring of 2008, Chapman reported to Havana to meet with Cuban president Raúl Castro who gave him a conditional reprieve, suspending him for the remainder of the National Series season and also keeping him off Cuba's national team for the 2008 Summer Olympics but allowing him to return to the National Series and play in the WBC in 2009.

Chapman successfully defected from Cuba while in Rotterdam, Netherlands, where the Cuban national team was participating in the World Port Tournament on July 1, 2009; Chapman walked out the front door of the team hotel and entered into an automobile driven by an acquaintance. Gerardo Concepción defected from the Cuban national team in the same tournament. Chapman eventually established residency in Andorra and petitioned MLB to be granted free agent status.

=== Minor leagues ===
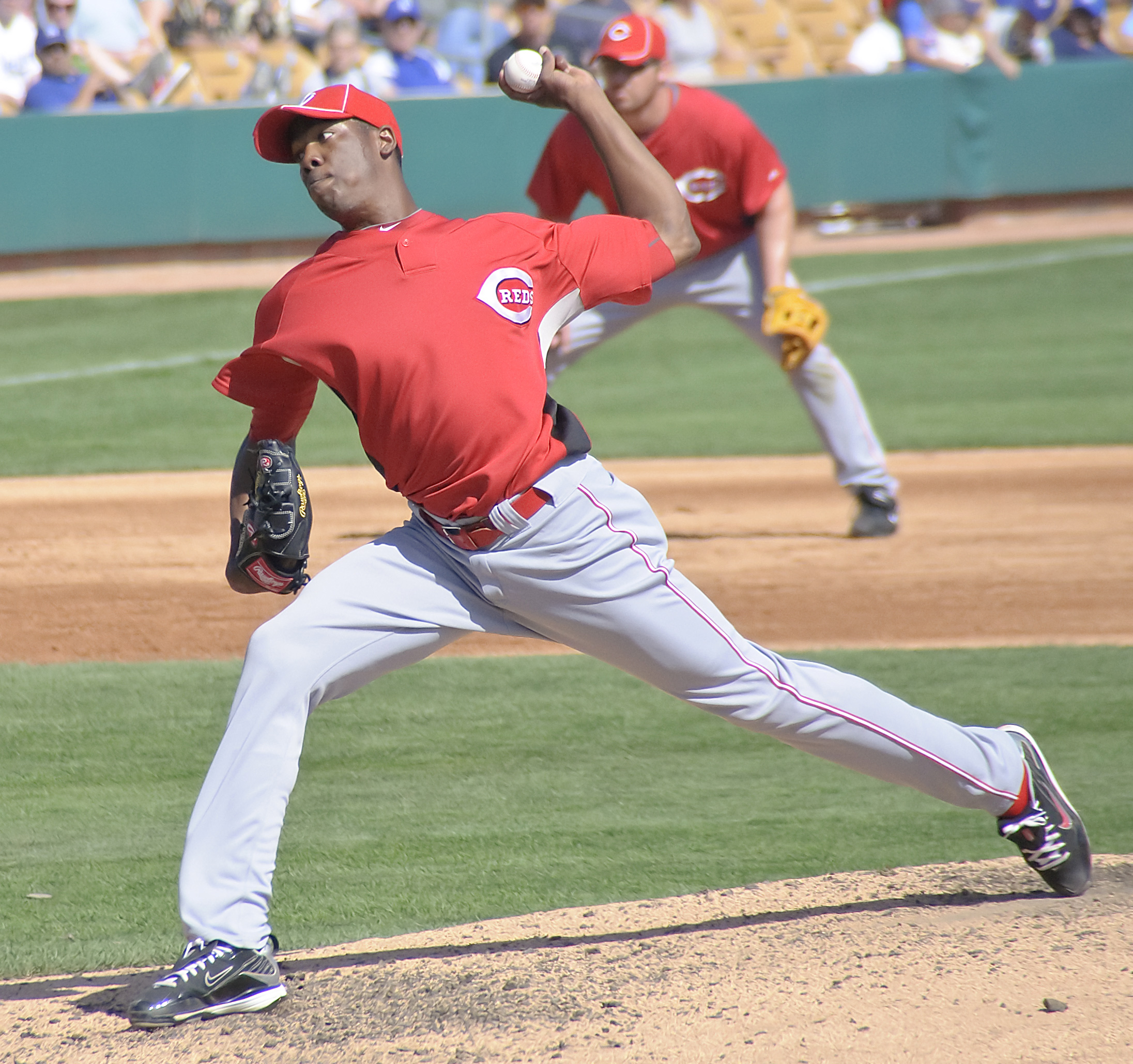
Chapman pitching for the Cincinnati Reds in 2010 spring training

On January 10, 2010, Chapman signed a six-year contract with the Cincinnati Reds worth $30.25 million. The Associated Press reported that the signing bonus totals $10.25 million, paid annually over 11 years, with an additional bonus if he became eligible for salary arbitration in 2012 or 2013.

Chapman began the 2010 season assigned to the Triple-A Louisville Bats, and made his professional debut with the Louisville Bats on Sunday, April 11, in Toledo against the Mud Hens, where he pitched 4 2/3 innings, giving up one unearned run, while striking out nine. Chapman made 13 starts with Louisville, pitching to a 4.11 ERA, and pitched to a 2.40 ERA after the team used him as a relief pitcher.

=== Cincinnati Reds (2010–2015) ===
==== 2010 season ====
Chapman made his Major League debut August 31, 2010, in the eighth inning against the Milwaukee Brewers; his first pitch was clocked at 98 mph (158 km/h) as a called strike (which was promptly tossed to the dugout by catcher Ryan Hanigan, to be saved). In nine pitches he retired the side. He recorded his first Major League win on September 1 after pitching an inning of relief against the Brewers. Chapman threw the fastest pitch recognized by MLB on September 24, 2010, at Petco Park in San Diego, California. It was clocked at 105.1 mph (169.1 km/h) to Tony Gwynn Jr. in the eighth inning.

In Game 2 of the 2010 NLDS against the Philadelphia Phillies, Chapman allowed three unearned runs due to miscues of the outfielders. He got his first career postseason loss and the Reds lost the division series to the Phillies in a three-game sweep.

==== 2011 season ====
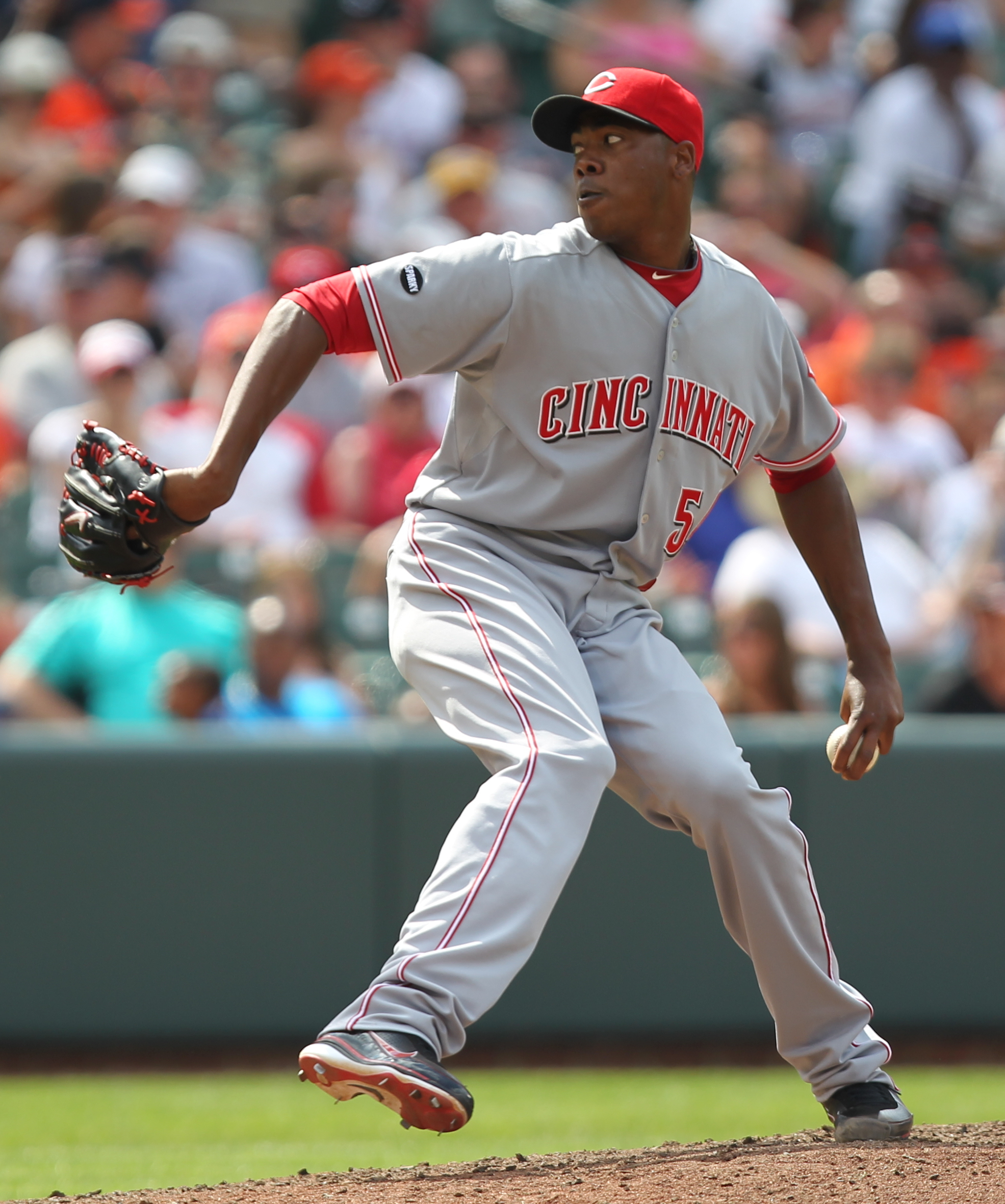
Chapman pitching for the Cincinnati Reds in 2011

Chapman served solely as a relief pitcher in 2011, appearing in 54 regular season games and finishing the season with a 3.60 ERA. He also struck out 71 batters in just 50 innings of work that season.

==== 2012 season ====
Chapman was due to be introduced as a starter for the 2012 season, but preseason injuries to closer Ryan Madson and middle relievers Bill Bray and Nick Masset led manager Dusty Baker to put Chapman in the setup role. Interim closer Sean Marshall struggled early in the season, and Chapman was given the closer role in late May.

On July 1, 2012, Chapman was named to his first All-Star Game. Chapman won the MLB Delivery Man of the Month Award for July 2012, in which he recorded 13 saves while not allowing a run in 14 1/3 innings while striking out 31 batters—more than 60% of the batters he faced. It was the third month of the season in which he did not allow a single run. He was named the August Delivery Man of the Month. Chapman finished the 2012 season with a 1.51 ERA and 38 saves in 43 chances, recording 122 strikeouts and 23 walks in 71 2/3 innings.

==== 2013 season ====
In March 2013, it was announced that Chapman would be the closer for the Cincinnati Reds. He was an All-Star selection for the second season in a row. He finished the 2013 year with 38 saves, a 4–5 record, 112 strikeouts, and a 2.54 ERA.

==== 2014 season ====
During a spring training game against the Kansas City Royals on March 19, 2014, Chapman was struck in the head by a line drive from Salvador Pérez. The spring-training game between the Reds and the Royals was ended at that point with Kansas City leading 8–3. Chapman underwent surgery to fix a skull fracture above his left eye. A metal plate was inserted into his head to stabilize the fracture.

Chapman began the 2014 season on the 15-day disabled list. He was activated from the disabled list on May 10. Chapman recorded his 100th save against the Arizona Diamondbacks on July 29, 2014, becoming the eighth-fastest pitcher to reach the milestone. In the 20-pitch appearance, Chapman threw 15 fastballs, all of which were above 100 mph. On September 23, 2014, Chapman recorded his 100th strikeout in his 51st inning pitched of the season, making him the fastest pitcher ever to reach that milestone. In 54 appearances, Chapman produced 106 strikeouts with 36 saves going 0–3 with an ERA of 2.00.

==== 2015 season ====
Chapman and the Reds agreed to a one-year, $8.05 million contract on February 13, 2015. Chapman was selected to the 2015 MLB All-Star Game. He pitched a scoreless ninth inning and struck out the side on 14 pitches, 12 of which were recorded at 100 mph or greater. His fastest pitch in 2015 was 103.9 mph, best in MLB. His four-seam fastball had the highest average speed of any MLB pitcher's pitches in 2015, at 100.0 mph. In the 2015 season, Chapman made 65 relief appearances with a 4–4 record, a 1.63 ERA, and 33 saves.

=== New York Yankees (2016) ===
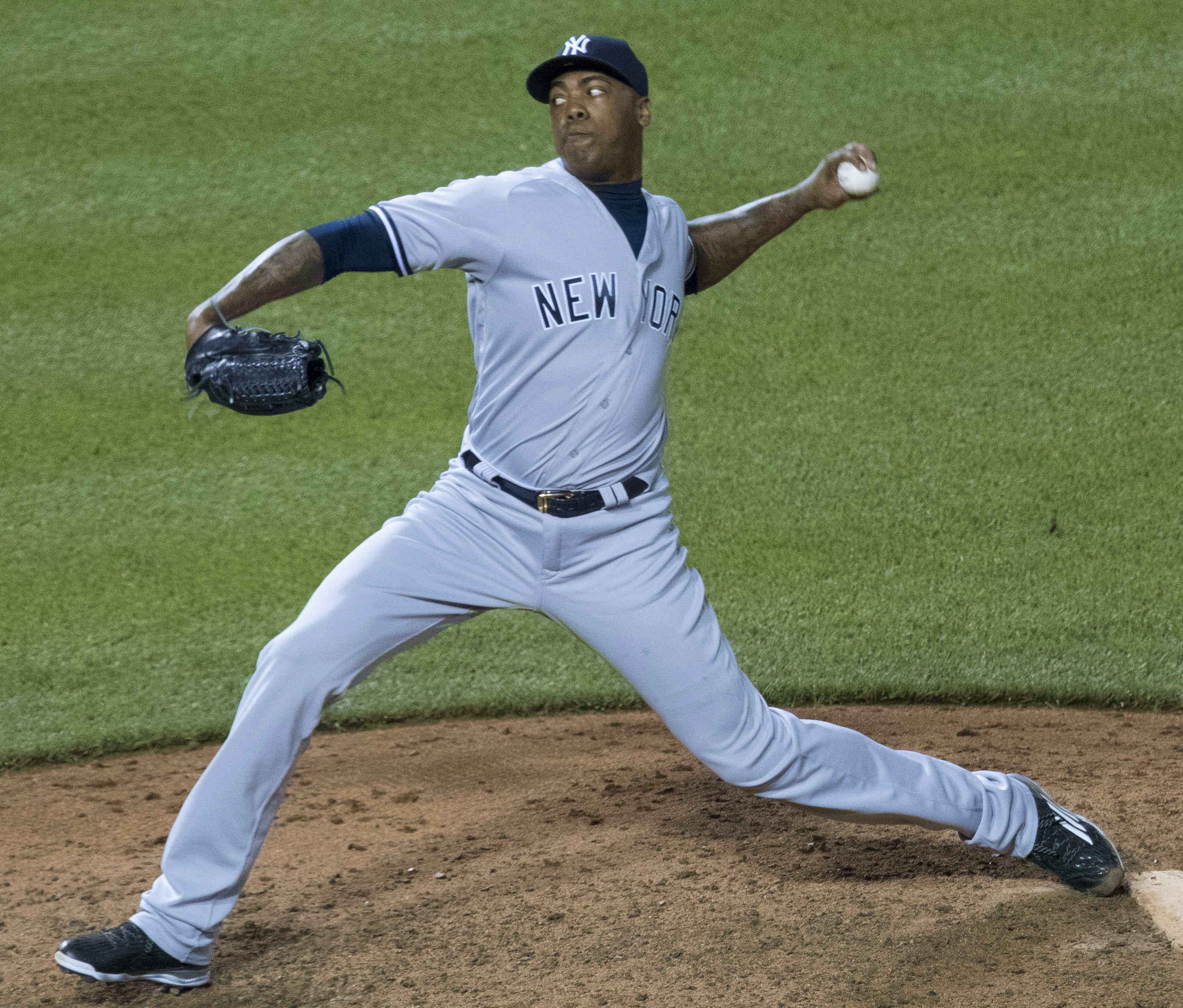
Chapman with the Yankees in 2016

On December 28, 2015, Chapman was traded to the New York Yankees. Cincinnati received four minor league players including right-handed pitchers Caleb Cotham and Rookie Davis, and infielders Eric Jagielo and Tony Renda in the exchange. On January 11, 2016, manager Joe Girardi named Chapman the team's new closer. He avoided arbitration on February 12, 2016, by agreeing to a one-year contract worth $11.325 million.

MLB suspended Chapman for the first 30 games of the season due to an off-season personal conduct policy violation related to domestic violence. He made his first appearance for the Yankees on May 9, 2016, striking out two and allowing a run as the Yankees won 6–3 over the Kansas City Royals. On July 18 against the Orioles, Chapman threw for 105 miles per hour (169 km/h) twice in the top of the ninth inning, averaging 103.2 miles per hour (166.1 km/h) with his fastball.

The triumvirate of Betances, Chapman, and Miller became known by fans as "No Runs–D.M.C.", owing to the relievers' dominance of opposing hitters.

=== Chicago Cubs (2016) ===
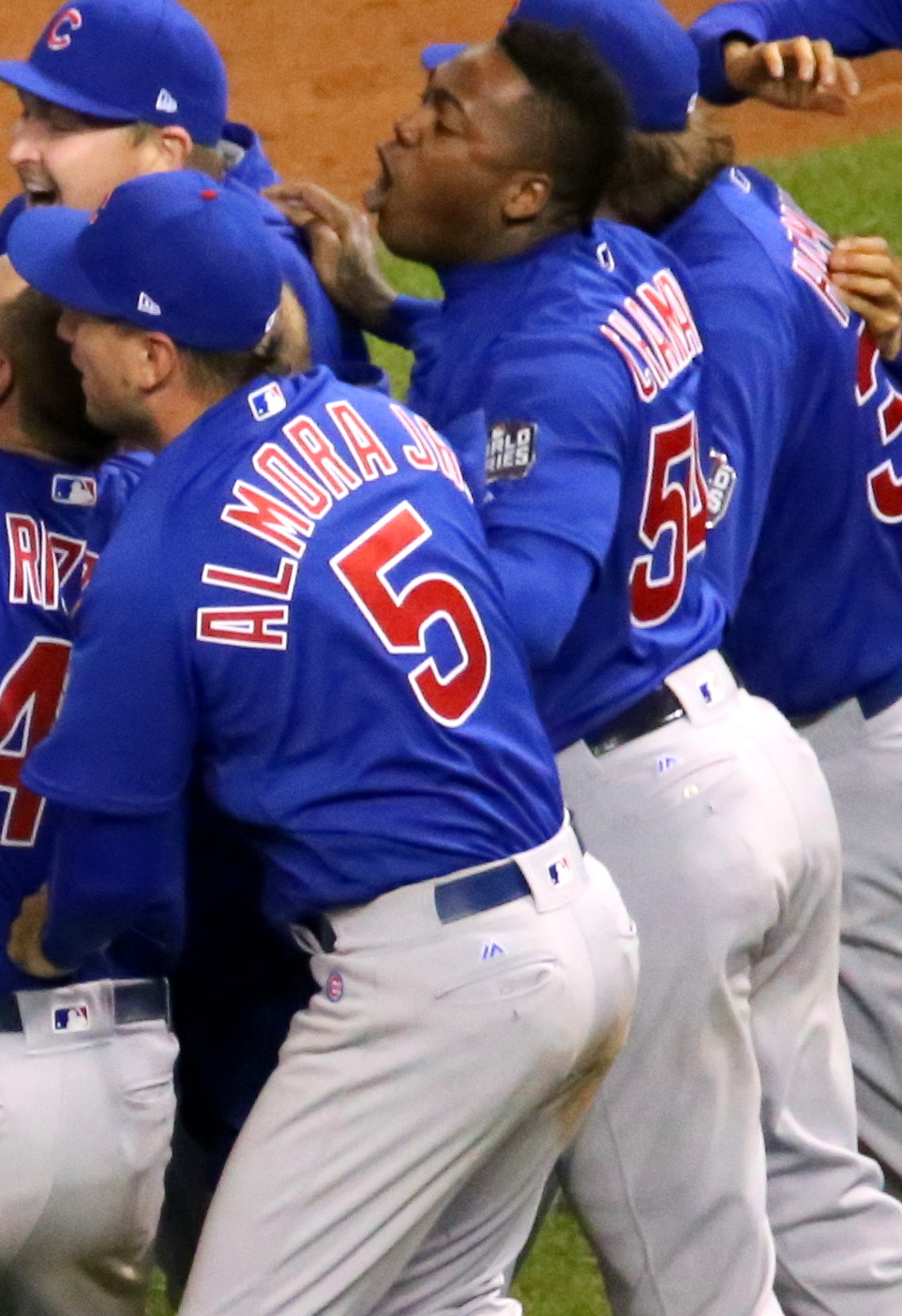
Chapman with the Chicago Cubs in Game 7 of the 2016 World Series

On July 25, 2016, the Yankees traded Chapman to the Chicago Cubs for Gleyber Torres, Billy McKinney, Adam Warren, and Rashad Crawford. In an interview with ESPN, Chapman stated he was thrilled that the Cubs went after him, especially considering the recent success of Héctor Rondón. Chapman made his first appearance as a member of the Cubs on July 27, pitching a 1–2–3 ninth and striking out two batters in a non-save situation. His fastest pitch in 2016 was 105.1 miles an hour, best in MLB. His four-seam fastball had the highest average speed of any MLB pitcher's pitches in 2016, at 100.9 mph, and his two-seam fastball had the third-highest average speed at 100.4 mph (161.6 km/h).

Chapman made three saves in four opportunities in the 2016 National League Division Series against the San Francisco Giants to tie and set new Division Series records respectively; Wade Davis tied his record in the 2017 National League Division Series, but Davis did it with only three opportunities.

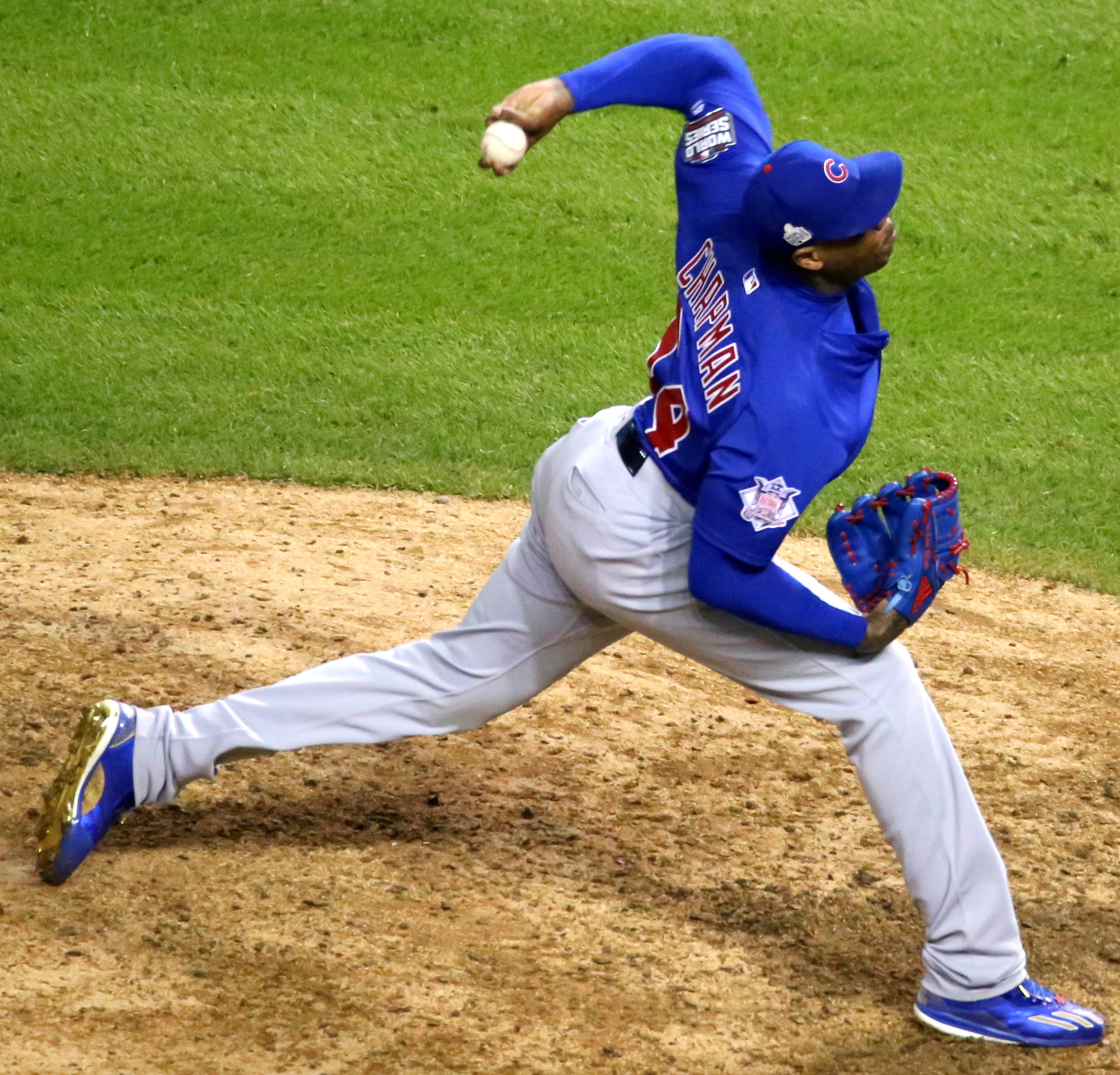
Chapman delivers a pitch during Game 6 of the 2016 World Series

Chapman made four appearances during the 2016 National League Championship Series (NLCS) against the Los Angeles Dodgers. Chapman blew a save opportunity during the first game of the NLCS, but the Cubs rallied back and Chapman remained in the game to earn the win. He pitched the final 1 2/3 innings of Game 6 to secure the Cubs' first pennant since 1945.

Chapman's workload in the 2016 World Series escalated with the Cubs facing elimination at the hands of the Cleveland Indians. Down 3–1 in the series, Chapman pitched through the seventh, eighth, and ninth innings of Game 5, allowing only one hit and preserving the Cubs' 3–2 lead. He was called upon again in the seventh and eighth innings of Game 6, where he allowed one hit and one run en route to a 9–3 victory. Chapman appeared the next day to close out Game 7 with a 6–3 lead in the bottom of the eighth inning, but blew the save opportunity, allowing Cleveland to tie the game on a two-run homer by Rajai Davis. Chapman pitched through the bottom of the ninth to send the game into extra innings. The Cubs tallied the game-winning run in the 10th inning, making Chapman the winning pitcher and giving him his first World Series title.

=== Second stint with New York Yankees (2017–2022) ===
On December 15, 2016, Chapman signed a five-year, $86 million contract to return to the Yankees. This was the largest contract given to a relief pitcher until it was surpassed by Edwin Díaz in 2022.

==== 2017 season ====
On May 14, 2017, Chapman was placed on the 10-day disabled list due to rotator cuff inflammation in his left shoulder. Although MRIs revealed no structure damage, Chapman was ruled out for at least two weeks. On June 18, the Yankees activated Chapman from the DL and he pitched that afternoon against the Oakland A's.

On August 13, Chapman gave up a home run to Rafael Devers of the Boston Red Sox. The pitch was clocked at 103 mph, making it the fastest pitch hit for a home run in the Statcast era (breaking Kurt Suzuki's home run off of a Chapman 102 mph pitch the previous year). It was also Chapman's first home run given up to a left-handed batter since Luke Scott of the Baltimore Orioles did so in 2011. Later that month, Chapman gave up only his third home run off a left-hander when Yonder Alonso of the Seattle Mariners hit one of his 101 mph fastballs out. His fastest pitch of 2017 was 104.3 miles an hour, best in MLB. His four-seam fastball had the highest average speed of any MLB pitcher's pitches in 2017, at 99.7 mph.

==== 2018 season ====
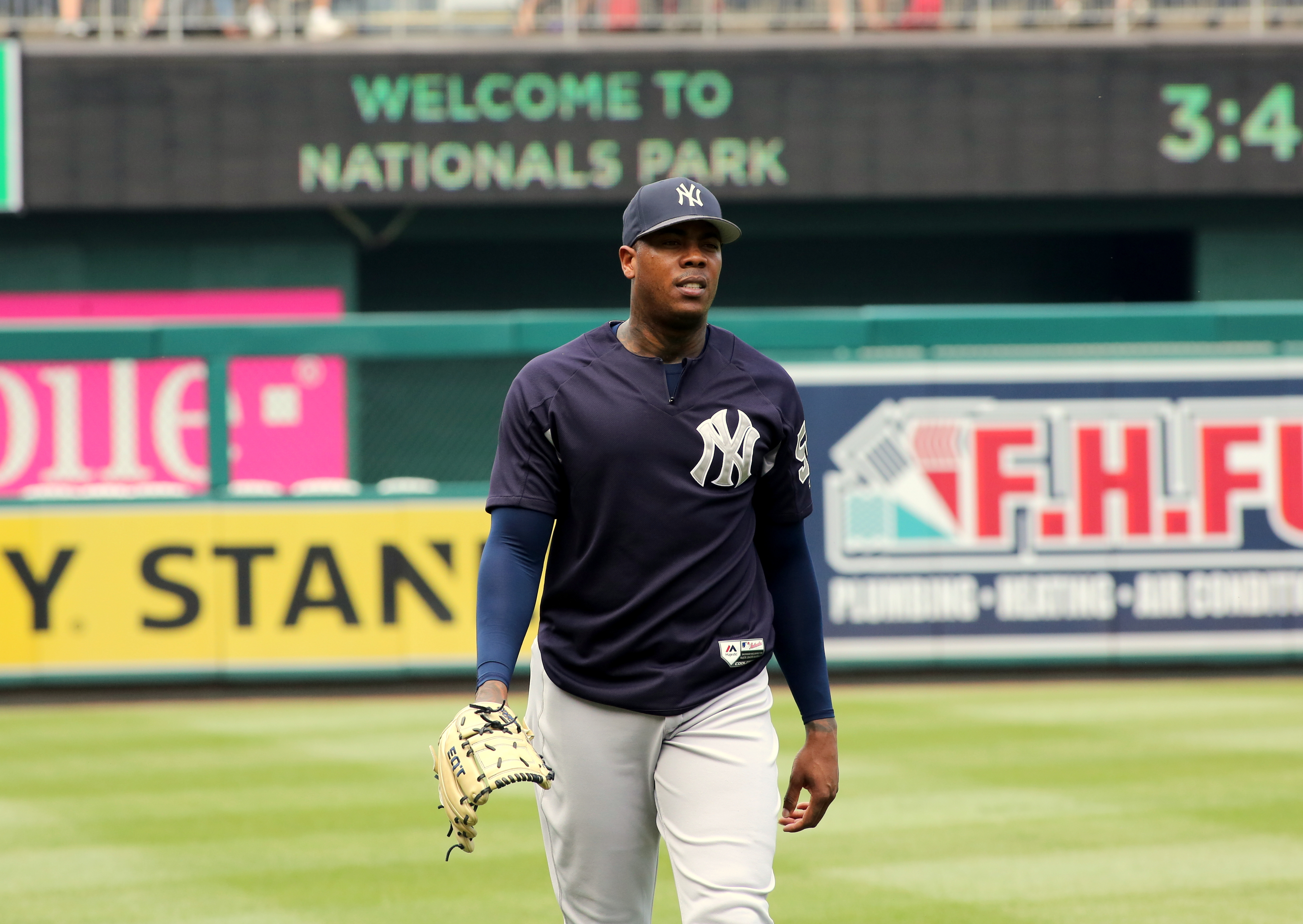
Chapman with the Yankees in 2018

In 2018 Chapman was elected as an MLB All-Star, representing the American League. On July 13, 2018, he announced that he would skip the All Star Game to rest his knee due to tendinitis. On August 22, Chapman was placed on the 10-day disabled list due to left knee tendinitis. His fastest pitch of 2018 was 104.4 miles an hour, second-best in MLB only to pitches by Jordan Hicks. His sinker had the highest average speed of any MLB pitcher's pitches in 2018, at 100.9 mph. In 2018, he had the lowest swing rate for his in-strike-zone sliders of any pitcher in baseball (42.5%).

==== 2019 season ====
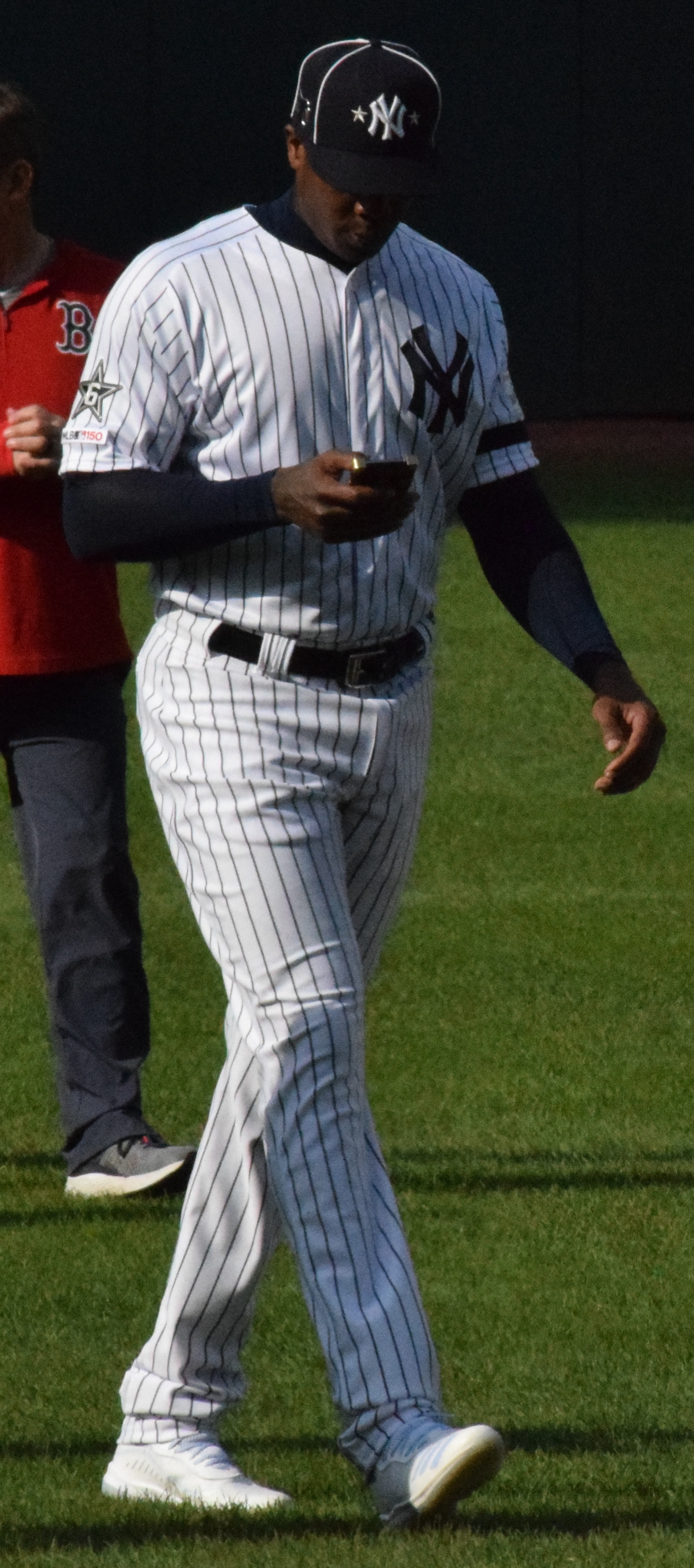
Chapman at the 2019 All-Star Game

In 2019, he was 3–2 with 37 saves and a 2.21 ERA, as in 60 relief appearances he struck out 85 batters in 57.0 innings (13.4 per nine innings). He received the AL Reliever of the Month Award for both May and August. He received the Mariano Rivera American League Reliever of the Year Award at the end of the season. Chapman logged one save in the American League Division Series and one in the American League Championship Series but gave up a walk-off home run to Jose Altuve with two outs in the ninth inning of Game 6 of the ALCS, eliminating the Yankees from the playoffs.

==== 2020 season ====
On July 11, 2020, during the COVID-19 pandemic, it was reported that Chapman had tested positive for the virus. Manager Aaron Boone announced that he was cleared to return to the team on July 31. Chapman pitched in his first major league game of 2020 on August 17. On September 2, Chapman received a three-game suspension for throwing a pitch at the head of Tampa Bay Rays batter Mike Brosseau. Brosseau later hit a game-winning home run off Chapman in Game 5 of the ALDS, effectively ending the Yankees season. His 100.5 mph-average sinker was the fastest sinker of any major league pitcher for the 2020 season. During the regular season, Chapman recorded a 3.09 ERA and 22 strikeouts in 11 2/3 innings.

==== 2021 season ====
On August 26, 2021, Chapman recorded his 300th career save, closing out a 7–6 victory against the Oakland Athletics. On September 30, Chapman recorded his 1,000th strikeout during a game against the Toronto Blue Jays. He struck out George Springer in the bottom of the ninth inning, eventually winning the game 6–2. Chapman finished the 2021 season with 30 saves and a 3.36 ERA. He recorded 97 strikeouts and 38 walks in 56 1/3 innings.

==== 2022 season ====
Chapman went on the injured list in May 2022 due to achilles tendinitis and lost the closer role to Clay Holmes. He went on the injured list again in August due to an infection that developed when he got a tattoo. Chapman missed a mandatory workout before the 2022 American League Division Series and was left off the team's postseason roster.

=== Kansas City Royals (2023) ===
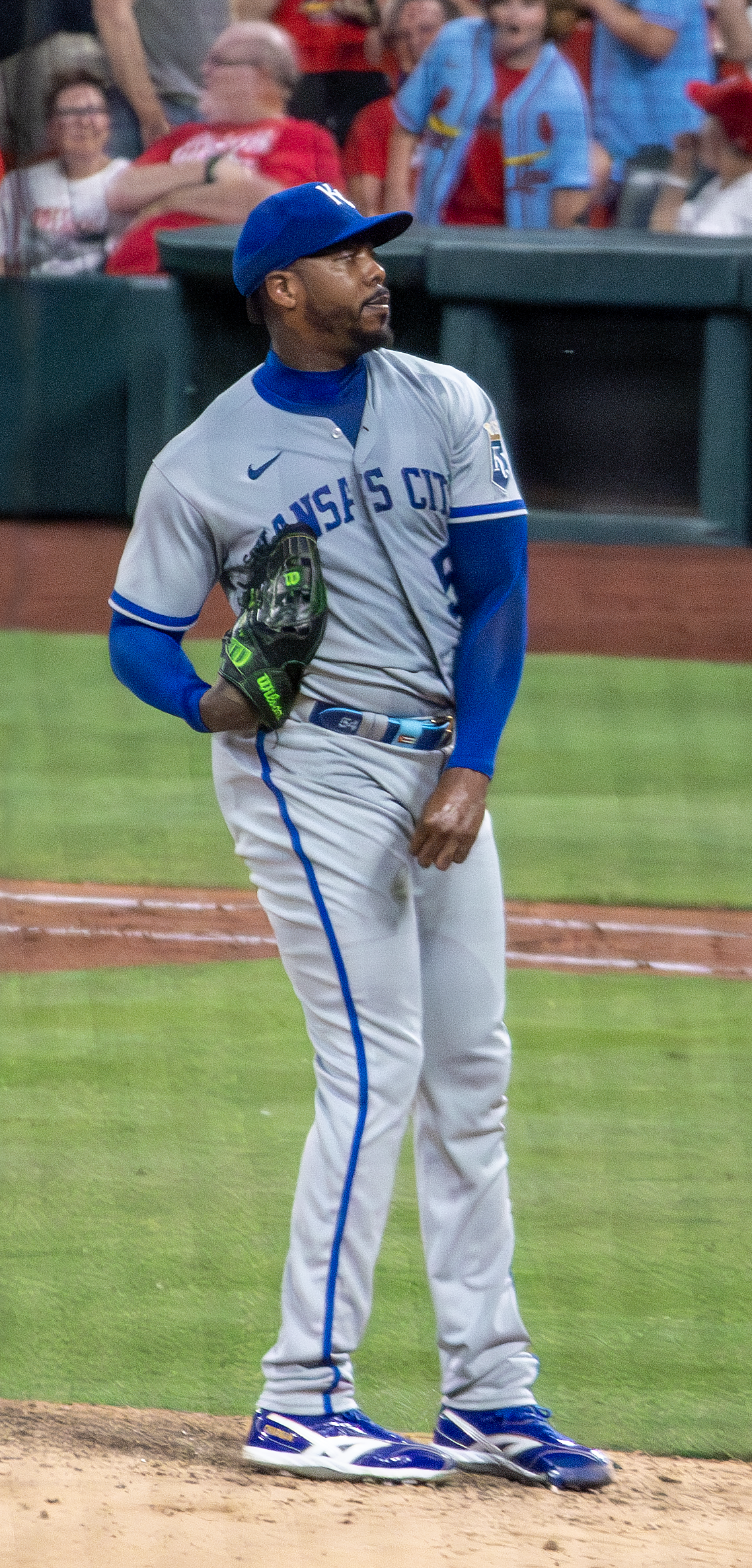
Chapman with the Royals in 2023

On January 27, 2023, Chapman signed a one-year contract with the Kansas City Royals. He went 4–2 with 2.45 ERA in 31 appearances with the Royals in 2023.

=== Texas Rangers (2023) ===
On June 30, 2023, the Royals traded Chapman to the Texas Rangers in exchange for Cole Ragans and Roni Cabrera. He went 2–3 with 4 saves and a 3.72 ERA in 30 regular season appearances, and went on to pitch six innings with a 2.75 ERA across the 2023 postseason, ultimately winning his second World Series ring.

=== Pittsburgh Pirates (2024) ===
On January 31, 2024, Chapman signed a one-year, $10.5 million contract with the Pittsburgh Pirates. On June 29, 2024, Chapman recorded his 1,197th career strikeout to pass Billy Wagner for the most strikeouts by a left-handed reliever.

=== Boston Red Sox (2025–present) ===
==== 2025 season ====
On December 10, 2024, Chapman signed a one-year, $10.75 million contract with the Boston Red Sox.

Chapman came into spring training in a battle with Liam Hendriks and Justin Slaten for the Red Sox closer role. After spring training, Red Sox manager Alex Cora announced Chapman as the closer to start the season. Chapman started off strong, getting the win in his Red Sox debut on Opening Day, and consistently getting saves. On April 19, 2025, Chapman threw the fastest pitch recorded for a Red Sox pitcher with 102.3 miles per hour, only to break his own record seven days later, throwing a pitch recorded at 103.4 mph. The Red Sox were the sixth team in which Chapman broke the franchise's record for fastest pitch. On July 2, he earned the 350th save of his career against the Cincinnati Reds in Game 1 of a doubleheader. Four days later, on July 6, Chapman was named to his eighth All-Star Game, and his first since 2021.

On August 31, 2025, Chapman and the Red Sox agreed to a contract extension for the 2026 season worth $13.3 million, including a vesting option for the 2027 season.

Between July 27 to September 10, Chapman held a historic hitless streak. During that time, in 17 appearances, he struck out 21 batters and only walked four, giving up no hits or runs. The 17 appearances without giving up a hit was the third-longest such streak in the MLB since 1901, trailing only the Marlins' Randy Choate in 2011 (20 appearances), and the New York Mets' Tim Byrdak (18 appearance in 2018). Both Chapman's hitless and scoreless streak ended after he got walked off by the Athletics on September 10.

Chapman finished the regular season with a 5–3 record, 32 saves, and 1.17 ERA, which was the best of his career. His 32 saves were also the most since the 2019 season. He also only surrendered eight earned runs in 67 total appearances, which was the lowest total of a full season in his career. His outstanding year helped the Red Sox to their first playoff appearance since 2021, where they faced his former team, the New York Yankees in the Wild Card Series. In Game 1 of the series, Chapman came into the ninth inning with a 3–1 lead, and subsequently loaded the bases on the first three batters, giving the Yankees a prime opportunity at a comeback. However, Chapman rebounded by then getting three straight outs, and earned his first postseason save since 2020. Unfortunately, the Red Sox lost the next two games, ending their and Chapman's season.

In mid-November, Chapman was named the AL Reliever of the Year for the second time, his first win having come in 2019 as a member of the Yankees.

==== 2026 season ====
On July 3, 2026, Chapman recorded his 1,364th career strikeout, surpassing Hoyt Wilhelm and becoming the all-time career strikeout leader for relief pitchers. On July 10, Chapman was named to his ninth career All-Star Game. On August 3, Chapman was named the AL Reliever of the Month for July. Against the Baltimore Orioles on September 6, he became the ninth player to achieve 400 career saves.

== International career ==
Chapman was part of the Cuban national team at the 2007 Pan American Games, the 2007 Baseball World Cup and the 2009 World Baseball Classic. At the 2009 WBC, he started two games for Cuba, pitching 6.1 innings, allowing four runs, and notching eight strikeouts.

Chapman was reportedly eligible to play for Great Britain by virtue of his paternal grandparents, who lived in Jamaica when it was a British colony, before immigrating to Cuba. He was included on the preliminary roster of the Great Britain national baseball team for the 2023 World Baseball Classic, but ultimately did not play in the tournament. He again tried to play for Great Britain in the 2026 World Baseball Classic. However, his bid to play for Great Britain was denied; Chapman told WEEI that documentation showed it was actually his great-grandparents, rather than his grandparents, that had ties to Jamaica.

== Pitching style ==
=== Repertoire ===
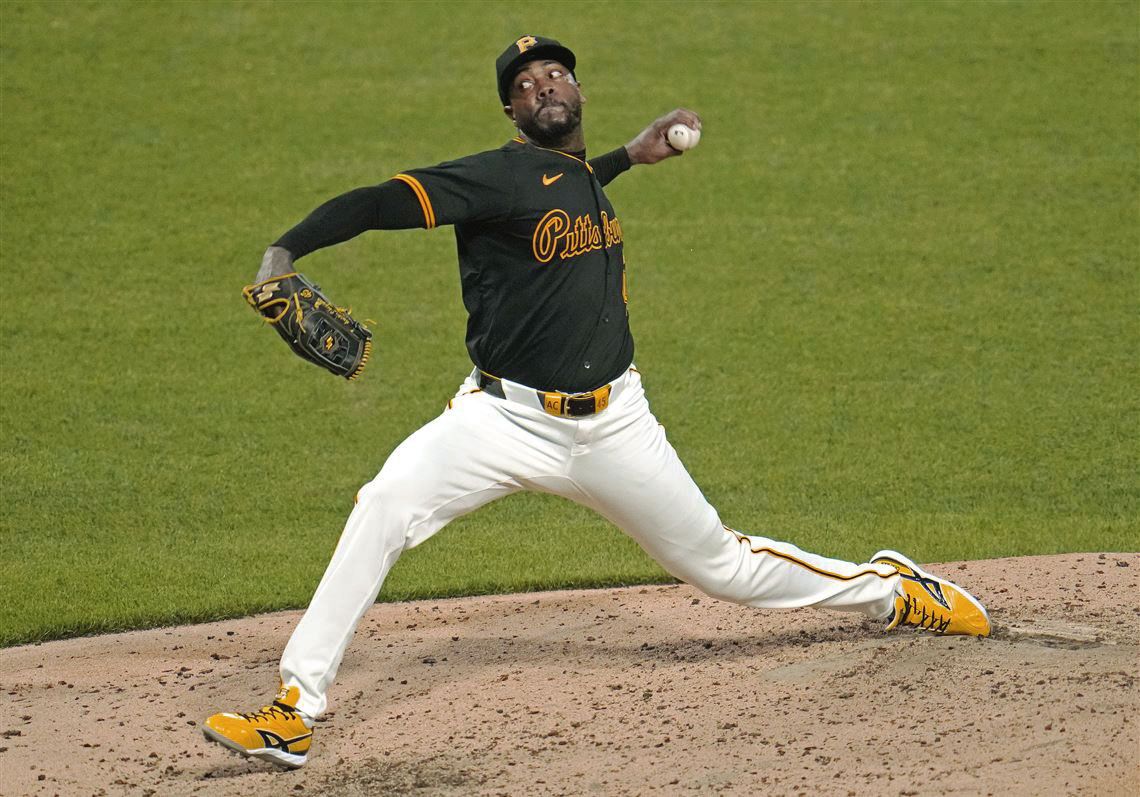
Chapman pitching for the Pirates in 2024

With a three-quarters delivery, Chapman throws four pitches: a four-seam fastball averaging 99–100 miles per hour (159–161 km/h), a slider averaging 87–88 miles per hour (140–142 km/h), a splitter, and a change-up. Since 2018, he also added a sinker that tops out at 102 miles per hour (164 km/h) and averages over 100 mph. His fastball averaged 100.3 miles per hour (161.4 km/h) in 2010, but that declined to 98.6 miles per hour (158.7 km/h) in 2011 and 97.8 mph (157.4 km/h) through August 2012. This more modest speed might have been part of an attempt to better control his fastball. By 2015, Chapman's fastball averaged 99.98 miles per hour (160.90 km/h). That same year, Statcast revealed that Chapman threw the 62 fastest pitches of the season, topping out at 103.92 mph (167.24 km/h). In 2024, Chapman's fastball averaged 98.7 mph (158.8 km/h), while topping out at 105.1 miles per hour (169.1 km/h) according to Statcast.

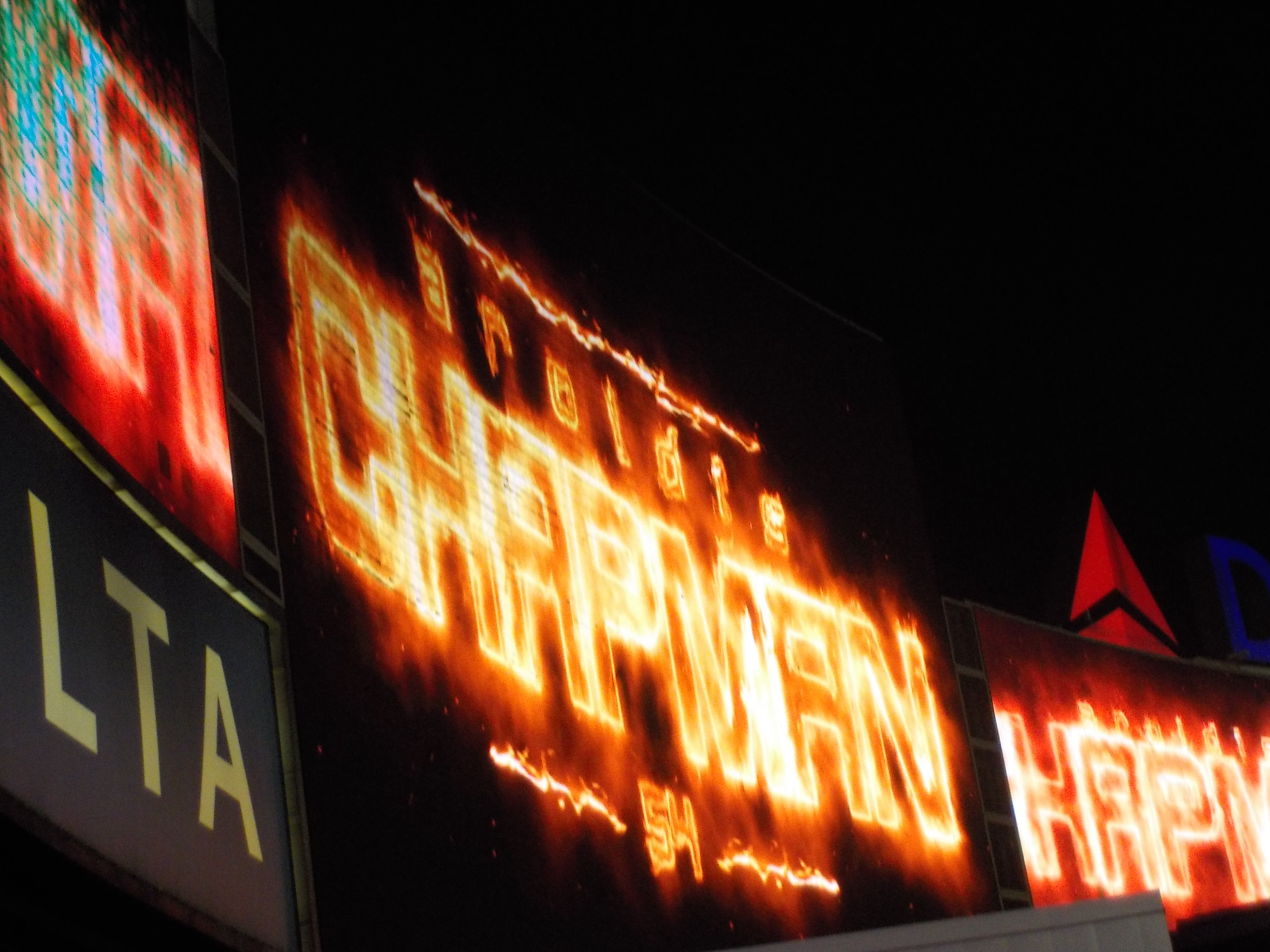
The scoreboard of Yankee Stadium "on fire" as Aroldis Chapman comes onto the field from the bullpen to close a game.

Chapman's fastball and slider both have extraordinarily high whiff rates: 33% for the fastball and 58% for the slider. As a result, Chapman has induced swinging strikes on 16.4 percent of pitches. He has struck out 40 percent of batters faced, third most among pitchers who have thrown 400 innings as of the end of the 2024 season.

Due to the high velocity of pitches that Chapman throws, before he comes in, the Yankees played a video on the scoreboards showing Chapman's name on fire, and fiery looking videos of him, as high velocity pitches are commonly called "heat."

Early on in his career, scouts worried about his control issues and lack of a solid third pitch, noting that these issues could affect his ability to be a Major League starter, but Chapman's control seemed to improve. After issuing 41 walks in 50 innings the previous season, Chapman walked 23 batters in 2012 over 71 2/3 innings. He has walked 12.6 percent of batters faced in his career as of the end of the 2024 season.

=== Speed records ===
On September 24, 2010, against the San Diego Padres, Chapman was clocked at 105.1 mph (169.1 km/h), according to PITCHf/x, the fastest pitch ever recorded in Major League Baseball. On July 19, 2016, Chapman matched his previous record of 105.1 mph with a ball to Baltimore's J. J. Hardy. In 2017, when MLB changed from the PITCHf/x to Statcast measurements, a pitch Chapman threw to Tony Gwynn Jr. on September 24, 2010, was revised up to 105.8 mph (170.3 km/h) and is now considered the fastest pitch thrown.

On April 18, 2011, Chapman threw a pitch to Pittsburgh's Andrew McCutchen that the scoreboard at Great American Ball Park clocked at 106 mph (171 km/h), but the box on Fox Sports Ohio's broadcast listed it at 105.1 mph (169.1 km/h) and the PITCHf/x system calculated a release speed of 102.4 mph (164.8 km/h). The disparity between these speeds has been widely discussed and questioned.

=== Mechanics ===
Sports Illustrated writer Joe Posnanski wrote of Chapman, "There is no violence at all in his motion; he's like the anti-Bob Gibson in that way. Just a slow beginning, a fluid motion, and BLAMMO the ball just fires out like the Batmobile rolling out of the cave." A technical analysis reveals the following:

1. Chapman breaks his hands late, so the arm as a whole gets involved late;
2. He shifts his weight before he breaks his hands;
3. Chapman gets low and creates tremendous leg drive;
4. At landing, he quickly braces his front leg and hip;
5. He also powerfully flexes his trunk forward over his landing knee.

One scout noted that although "[t]here are no obvious flaws in Chapman's delivery ... Chapman has to coordinate a lot of moving parts," which may limit his consistency. Chapman's extreme pitch speed may also pose an injury risk to his pitching arm over time.

Chapman's long and complicated delivery is significantly taxing on his body. He almost never pitches more than one inning per appearance, which is a major reason for him being used as a formidable closer.

== Personal life ==
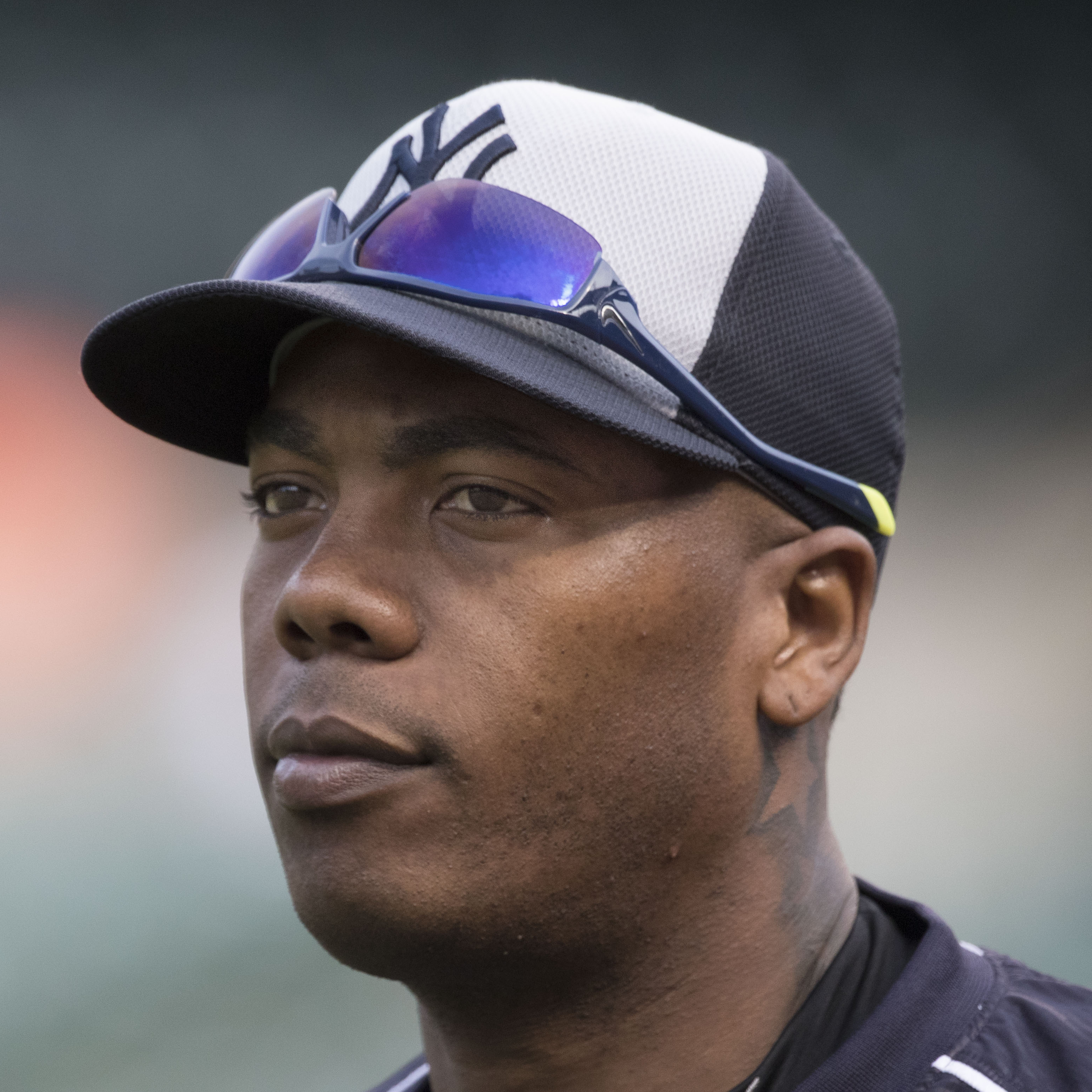
Chapman in 2016

When Chapman left Cuba, he left behind his father, mother, two sisters, girlfriend, and a newborn child. He reunited with them when he helped them transfer to the United States; the details of how they transferred remain confidential. In 2014, Chapman's son was born in Cincinnati. In May 2012, Chapman was sued for allegedly serving as "an informant for Cuban state authorities after a failed defection attempt and help[ing] turn in another man in order to get back on the country's national baseball team."

On December 7, 2015, news broke that Chapman was involved in an alleged domestic violence incident with his girlfriend in Davie, Florida, at his home on October 30, 2015. A pending trade with the Los Angeles Dodgers was put on hold as MLB announced it would investigate the incident as part of its personal conduct policy. In the incident, he was accused of pushing his girlfriend, putting his hands around her neck, and choking her, and subsequently firing eight gunshots. No charges were filed by the police due to inconsistency of the reports and insufficient evidence, and his attorney issued a statement denying the allegations. The trade to the Dodgers was canceled and the Reds traded Chapman to the New York Yankees three weeks later. Although he was not charged, MLB suspended Chapman for 30 games as a result of his "use of a firearm and the impact of that behavior on his partner," ending May 9, 2016. He was the first player disciplined by the new personal conduct policy enacted in August 2015, where MLB could suspend a player without a conviction.

Chapman became a United States citizen in April 2016. He is Catholic.

== See also ==
- Cincinnati Reds award winners and league leaders
- List of Major League Baseball career games finished leaders
- List of Major League Baseball players from Cuba
- List of baseball players who defected from Cuba
- List of Major League Baseball career saves leaders

Awards
Preceded by Alex Colomé; Shane Greene; Tommy Kahnle; Kenley Jansen; Jacob Latz	American League Reliever of the Month; September 2017; March–April 2019; August 2019; August 2025; July 2026	Succeeded by Edwin Díaz; Liam Hendriks; Brandon Workman; Cade Smith; Josh Hader
