= List of New York Mets no-hitters =

The New York Mets are a Major League Baseball franchise based in the New York City borough of Queens. Formed in 1962, they play in the National League East division. Pitchers for the Mets have thrown two no-hitters in franchise history. A no-hitter is officially recognized by Major League Baseball only "when a pitcher (or pitchers) allows no hits during the entire course of a game, which consists of at least nine innings", though one or more batters "may reach base via a walk, an error, a hit by pitch, a passed ball or wild pitch on strike three, or catcher's interference". No-hitters of less than nine complete innings were previously recognized by the league as official; however, several rule alterations in 1991 changed the rule to its current form. A no-hitter is rare enough that it took until 2021 for all thirty teams in Major League Baseball to accomplish the feat. No perfect games, a special subcategory of no-hitter, have been thrown in Mets history. As defined by Major League Baseball, "in a perfect game, no batter reaches any base during the course of the game."

== No-hitters ==
¶	Indicates a perfect game
£	Pitcher was left-handed
*	Member of the National Baseball Hall of Fame and Museum

#	Date	Pitcher	Final score	Base- runners	Opponent	Catcher	Plate umpire	Manager	Notes	Ref
1	June 1, 2012	Johan Santana^{£}	8–0	5	St. Louis Cardinals	Josh Thole	Gary Cederstrom	Terry Collins	First no-hitter in franchise history; First Mets no-hitter at home; First left-handed pitcher to throw a no-hitter in franchise history	
2	April 29, 2022	Tylor Megill (5 IP); Drew Smith (1 1/3 IP); Joely Rodríguez^{£} (1 IP); Seth Lugo (2/3 IP); Edwin Díaz (1 IP)	3–0	6	Philadelphia Phillies	James McCann	Ryan Wills	Buck Showalter	First combined no-hitter in franchise history; First right-handed pitchers involved in a no-hitter in franchise history; First combined no-hitter involving exactly five pitchers in MLB history; Set a major league record for most pitches thrown in a no hitter with 159	

== See also ==
- List of Major League Baseball no-hitters
