= Major League Baseball Delivery Man Award =

Major League Baseball Delivery Man Award may refer to:

- Major League Baseball Delivery Man of the Month Award
- Major League Baseball Delivery Man of the Year Award
