= Rafael Soriano =

Dominican baseball player (born 1979)

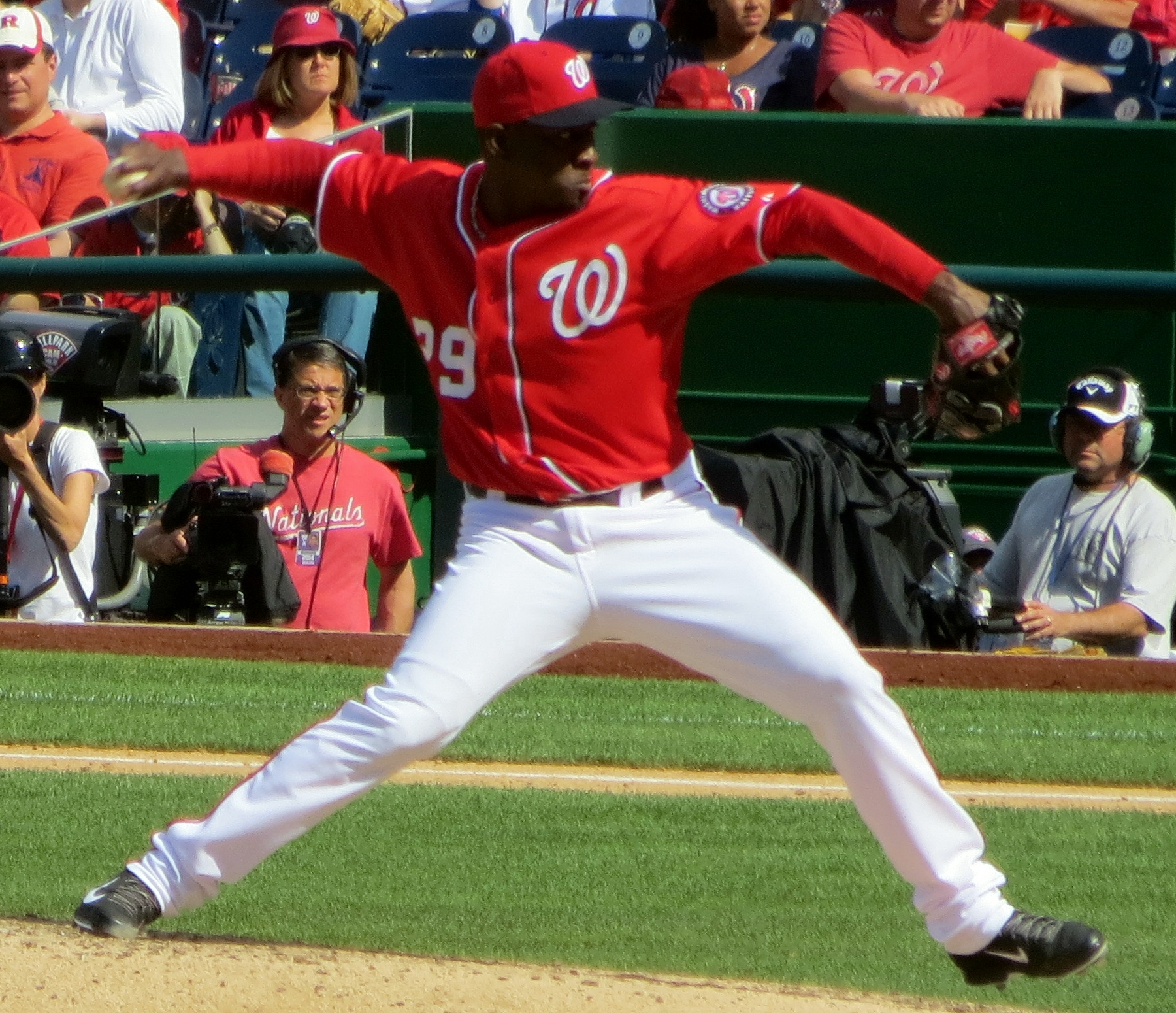
- Soriano with the Washington Nationals in 2014
- Pitcher
- Born: December 19, 1979 (age 46); San José de los Llanos, Dominican Republic
- Batted: Right Threw: Right

MLB debut
- May 10, 2002, for the Seattle Mariners

Last MLB appearance
- July 30, 2015, for the Chicago Cubs

MLB statistics
- Win–loss record: 24–28
- Earned run average: 2.89
- Strikeouts: 641
- Saves: 207
- Stats at Baseball Reference

Teams
- Seattle Mariners (2002–2006); Atlanta Braves (2007–2009); Tampa Bay Rays (2010); New York Yankees (2011–2012); Washington Nationals (2013–2014); Chicago Cubs (2015)

Career highlights and awards
- All-Star (2010); AL Rolaids Relief Man Award (2010); AL saves leader (2010)

Rafael Soriano (born December 19, 1979) is a Dominican former professional baseball pitcher. He played in Major League Baseball (MLB) for the Seattle Mariners, Atlanta Braves, Tampa Bay Rays, New York Yankees, Washington Nationals, and Chicago Cubs.

Soriano was an All-Star in 2010. That year, he also led the American League (AL) in saves, and was named the winner of the Delivery Man of the Month Award for May, July, and August, and the AL Rolaids Relief Man Award in the postseason.

== Early life ==
Soriano was born in San José de los Llanos, Dominican Republic. He lived in Boca Chica. By age 8, he played in weekly baseball tournaments in Santo Domingo. However, his mother, Magali, who worked as a housekeeper, often could not afford the twenty dominican pesos it cost for him to make the trip. Soriano would sometimes perform chores for the team's manager, who would then pay for the trip.

Soriano was not well connected to Dominican trainers, who fed information to the most prominent Major League Baseball scouts. Instead, he learned to play baseball through his uncles and his own determination. Soriano attended the Dominican baseball academy of the St. Louis Cardinals at the age of 16, but they opted not to sign him.

Soriano stopped training full-time and dropped out of school at 16 to work full-time in a carpentry shop. A friend told Soriano that he had signed a contract with the Hiroshima Carp, a team in the Central League of Nippon Professional Baseball, which had a Dominican academy in San Pedro de Macorís. After training with the Carp for three months, the team found out that at 16, Soriano was too young to sign. Soriano refused to falsify his documents, and he left the Carp training facility, returning to work.

== Professional career ==
=== Seattle Mariners ===
Ramón de los Santos, a scout for the Seattle Mariners, received a tip from an acquaintance about Soriano. After watching Soriano play for 12 minutes, de los Santos signed Soriano for a $5,000 signing bonus as an outfielder, figuring that with his strong throwing arm, Soriano could be converted into a pitcher. After a year and a half in Seattle's organization, playing for the Arizona Mariners of the Rookie-level Arizona League, Soriano struggled as an outfielder, batting .167 in 1998, his second year in Arizona. Heading into spring training in 1999, Soriano prepared himself for the possibility that Seattle would release him, at which point he planned to return to the Dominican Republic to work.

However, Soriano was able to throw as fast as 95 miles per hour (153 km/h) in Arizona. Rafael Chaves, who worked with Soriano in Arizona, suggested that the Mariners convert Soriano into a pitcher. Throwing in the bullpen, Soriano was able to throw between 87 and 90 miles per hour (140–145 km/h), which they figured would improve when he learned proper pitching mechanics. The Mariners assigned Soriano to the Everett AquaSox of the Low-A Northwest League in 1999. Chaves, working as Everett's pitching coach, helped Soriano with his development. For Everett, Soriano recorded 83 strikeouts and a team-leading 3.11 earned run average (ERA) in 75 1/3 innings pitched.

Soriano pitched for the Wisconsin Timber Rattlers of the Single-A Midwest League in 2000. With Wisconsin, Soriano had an 8-4 win–loss record and a 2.87 ERA. The Mariners optioned him to the San Bernardino Stampede of the High-A California League the next year. He was promoted to the San Antonio Missions of the Double-A Texas League later in the season. Between San Bernardino and San Antonio, Soriano pitched to a 2.82 ERA with 151 strikeouts in 137 1/3 innings in 2001.

Before the 2002 season, Baseball America ranked Soriano the 30th best prospect in baseball. However, his arrival in the United States was delayed for three months due to difficulty securing a visa. Soriano made his major league debut with the Mariners on May 10, 2002, recording a save in the game. After making his second relief appearance, the Mariners added Soriano to the team's starting rotation. Teammate Freddy García nicknamed Soriano "El Silencioso" (transl. "The Silent One"), for his propensity to retreat from his teammates, speaking only to family by phone. After pitching in ten games for the Mariners, pitching to a 0–3 record with a 4.56 ERA in 47 1/3, Soriano went on the disabled list with a sore shoulder on July 10. When the Mariners activated him in August, they optioned him to San Antonio. Soriano spent the rest of the season in San Antonio, where he focused on improving his changeup and slider.

Going into the 2003 season, Baseball America rated Soriano the 27th best prospect in baseball. He competed for a spot in the Mariners' starting rotation during spring training. He started the season with the Tacoma Rainiers of the Triple-A Pacific Coast League. After an effective 2003 season, Soriano suffered a torn ulnar collateral ligament in his right elbow and underwent Tommy John surgery on August 17, 2004.

Soriano returned to the majors on September 10, 2005. He suffered a concussion on August 29, 2006, after being struck behind the ear by a line drive hit from Angels slugger Vladimir Guerrero. Soriano was released from the hospital the following afternoon.

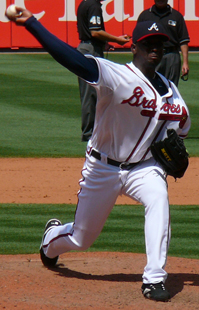
Soriano pitching for the Braves in May 2007

=== Atlanta Braves ===
Soriano was traded to the Atlanta Braves from the Mariners on December 7, 2006, for left-handed pitcher Horacio Ramírez. Soriano had a mixed bag of success and disappointment in his first season in Atlanta, primarily serving as the setup man to closer Bob Wickman. Soriano became the Braves closer after Wickman was designated for assignment in August. Soriano earned his first save since May 10 on August 30, then earned three saves in September. Soriano was suspended for four games on September 20 after hitting Dan Uggla with a pitch. The suspension was reduced to two games after appeal. He finished his first season as a Brave with a 3–3 record and 3.00 ERA. Soriano signed a two-year contract with the Braves worth $9 million on January 24, 2008. However, elbow injuries limited him to only 14 innings in 2008.

In 2009, he allowed no inherited runners to score and had a career-high 12.13 strikeouts per nine innings. He had a 1–6 record with 27 saves in a career-high 75 2/3 innings. That offseason, the Braves offered Soriano arbitration, expecting that he would decline and test free agency. However, Soriano surprised the Braves by accepting arbitration. Atlanta then traded Soriano to the Tampa Bay Rays on December 10 for Jesse Chavez.

=== Tampa Bay Rays ===
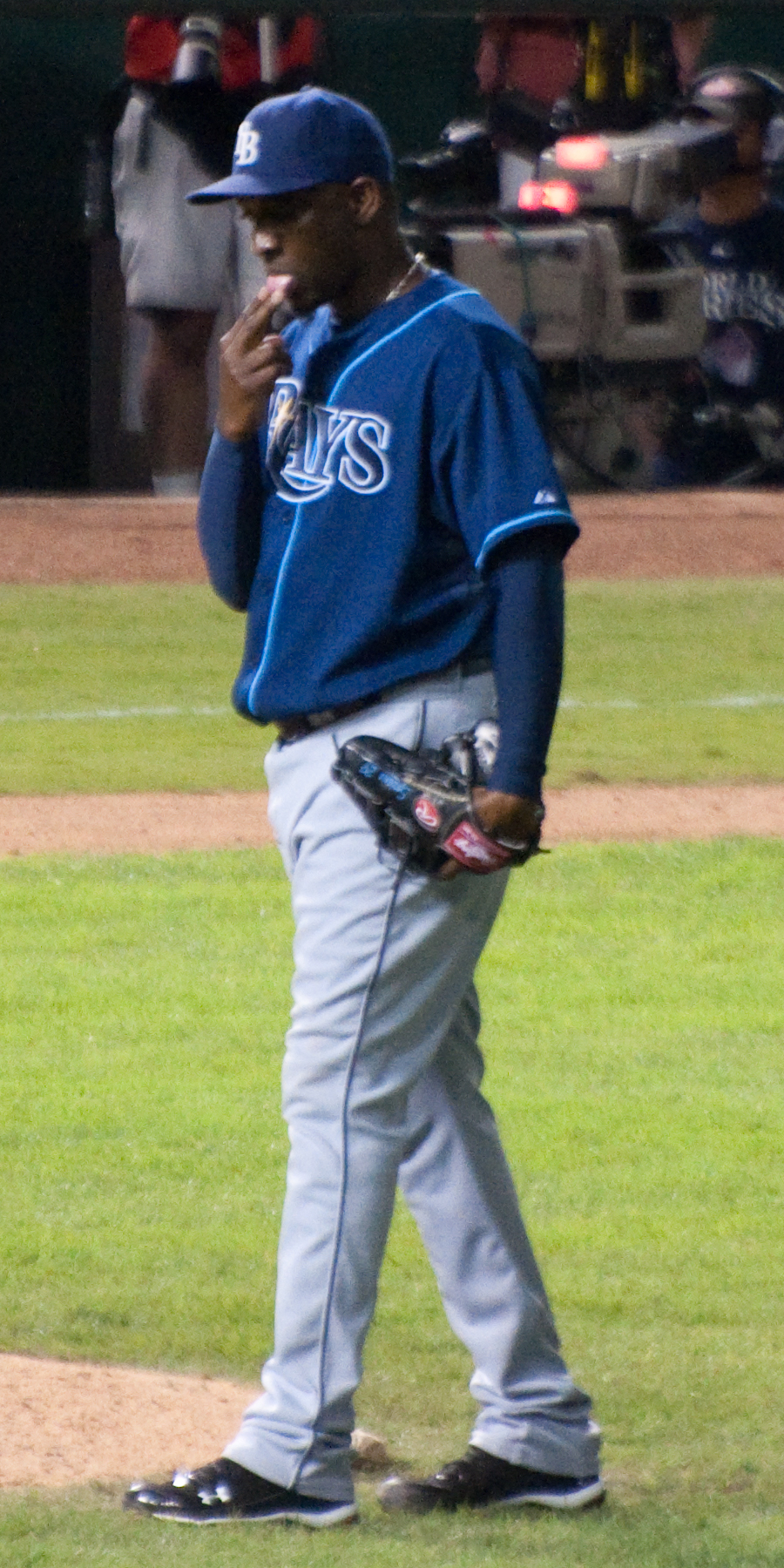
Soriano with the Rays in 2010

Soriano won the Delivery Man of the Month Award for May and July 2010, becoming the first pitcher to earn that honor twice in one season. He was named to the Major League Baseball All-Star Game to replace an injured Mariano Rivera, his only All-Star selection. He won the Delivery Man of the Month Award a third time for August, joining Joe Nathan and Trevor Hoffman as the only three-time winners of the monthly award.

On August 23, in the ninth inning of game against the Los Angeles Angels, Soriano threw an immaculate inning, striking out all three batters on nine total pitches. He became the sixth major-league pitcher to record a save while doing so. Soriano led the American League in saves at the end of the 2010 season, with 45. Soriano finished eighth in the 2010 AL Cy Young Award voting.

=== New York Yankees ===
The Yankees signed Soriano to a three-year, $35 million contract on January 18, 2011. Soriano was originally designated as the set-up pitcher to closer Mariano Rivera. He picked up his first save as a Yankee against the Blue Jays on April 20, 2011. He recorded his first loss as a Yankee on April 26, giving up the tying and winning runs. On July 30, Soriano pitched his first game since coming off the DL, throwing a scoreless 9th inning, striking out 2 in a 17–3 blowout win vs. the Baltimore Orioles.

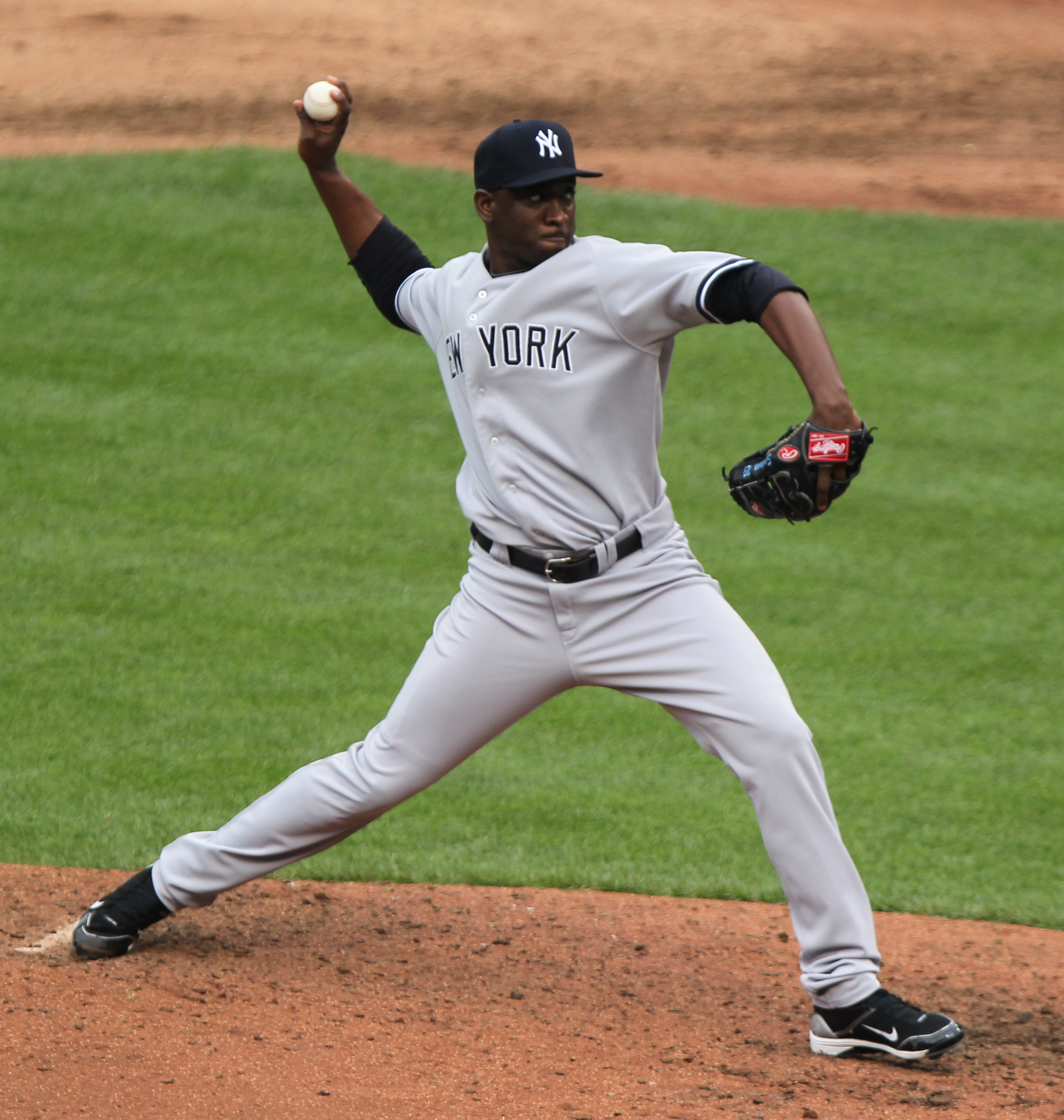
Soriano with the Yankees in 2011

Soriano had spent most of his Yankee career as the 7th inning pitcher in front of David Robertson and Rivera. After Rivera was injured for the 2012 season shagging fly balls at Kauffman Stadium in Kansas City, Robertson was slated for the closer role and Soriano the 8th. After closing two games, Robertson himself was temporarily injured, allowing Soriano an opportunity to close again where he thrived, converting his first 12 straight save opportunities. He finished with 42 saves in 46 opportunities. Soriano opted out of the final year of his contract on October 31, 2012, making him a free agent.

=== Washington Nationals ===
On January 15, 2013, Soriano and the Washington Nationals agreed to a $28 million, two-year contract, pending a physical. The deal came with a vesting option in 2015 if he finished 120 games. Only two active pitchers did that in the 2011–2012 combined seasons (Craig Kimbrel with 120 and José Valverde with 138). The deal became official on January 17. In 2013, Soriano recorded 43 saves with a 3.11 ERA, but blew a career-high six saves. His strikeout rate fell from 9.2 in 2012 to 6.9 in 2013. Soriano's hits per nine innings also regressed, but not as severely. Soriano's 2014 season began well, as he produced a 0.97 ERA in the first half. However, after the All-Star break Soriano tallied a 6.98 ERA, before being removed from the closer role on September 9. He became a free agent following the season on October 31.

=== Chicago Cubs ===
On June 9, 2015, Soriano signed a minor league contract with the Chicago Cubs. The contract came with a prorated $2 million salary. He was called up to the major league roster on July 20. He was designated for assignment on September 1 and released on September 4.

On February 28, 2016, Soriano signed a minor league contract with an invite to spring training with the Toronto Blue Jays. Due to visa issues, he was unable to join the Blue Jays for spring training. On March 17, it was reported that Soriano had decided to retire. Soriano made his retirement official on March 20.

== Pitching style ==
Soriano's primary pitch was a four-seam fastball in the 91-94 mph range. He paired it with a sharp slider in the low-to-mid 80s. Although he initially would regularly throw a two-seam fastball and cut fastball, these pitches seem to have mostly disappeared from his repertoire by 2012. Soriano was also a relatively slow worker on the mound, ranking among slowest 10 percent of pitchers in pitch tempo from 2010 to 2015, according to Statcast, though he did not slow down significantly with men on base.

== Personal life ==
Soriano engages in charity work in his native Boca Chica. He has given money to children to receive surgery and often buys Christmas presents for the local children.

== See also ==
- List of Tampa Bay Rays team records
