= J. J. Putz =

American baseball player (born 1977)

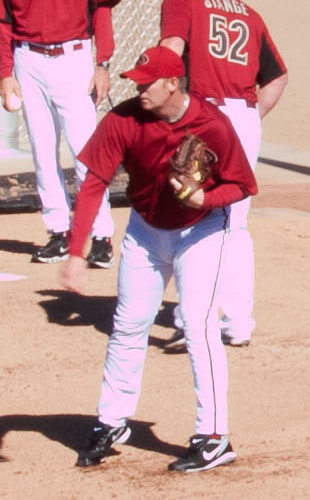
- Putz with the Arizona Diamondbacks in 2011
- Pitcher
- Born: February 22, 1977 (age 49); Trenton, Michigan, U.S.
- Batted: Right Threw: Right

MLB debut
- August 11, 2003, for the Seattle Mariners

Last MLB appearance
- June 19, 2014, for the Arizona Diamondbacks

MLB statistics
- Win–loss record: 37–33
- Earned run average: 3.08
- Strikeouts: 599
- Saves: 189
- Stats at Baseball Reference

Teams
- Seattle Mariners (2003–2008); New York Mets (2009); Chicago White Sox (2010); Arizona Diamondbacks (2011–2014)

Career highlights and awards
- All-Star (2007); AL Rolaids Relief Man Award (2007)

Joseph Jason Putz (/ˈpʊts/; born February 22, 1977) is an American former professional baseball relief pitcher. He played in Major League Baseball (MLB) for the Seattle Mariners, New York Mets, Chicago White Sox, and Arizona Diamondbacks.

== Early life and college ==
Born in Trenton, Michigan, Putz led Trenton High School to the 1995 Class B state championship. He graduated in 1995 and won the Mr. Baseball award for the state of Michigan. Putz attended the University of Michigan, and played collegiate summer baseball in the Cape Cod Baseball League for the Yarmouth-Dennis Red Sox in 1997 and the Hyannis Mets in 1998.

== Professional career ==
=== Seattle Mariners ===
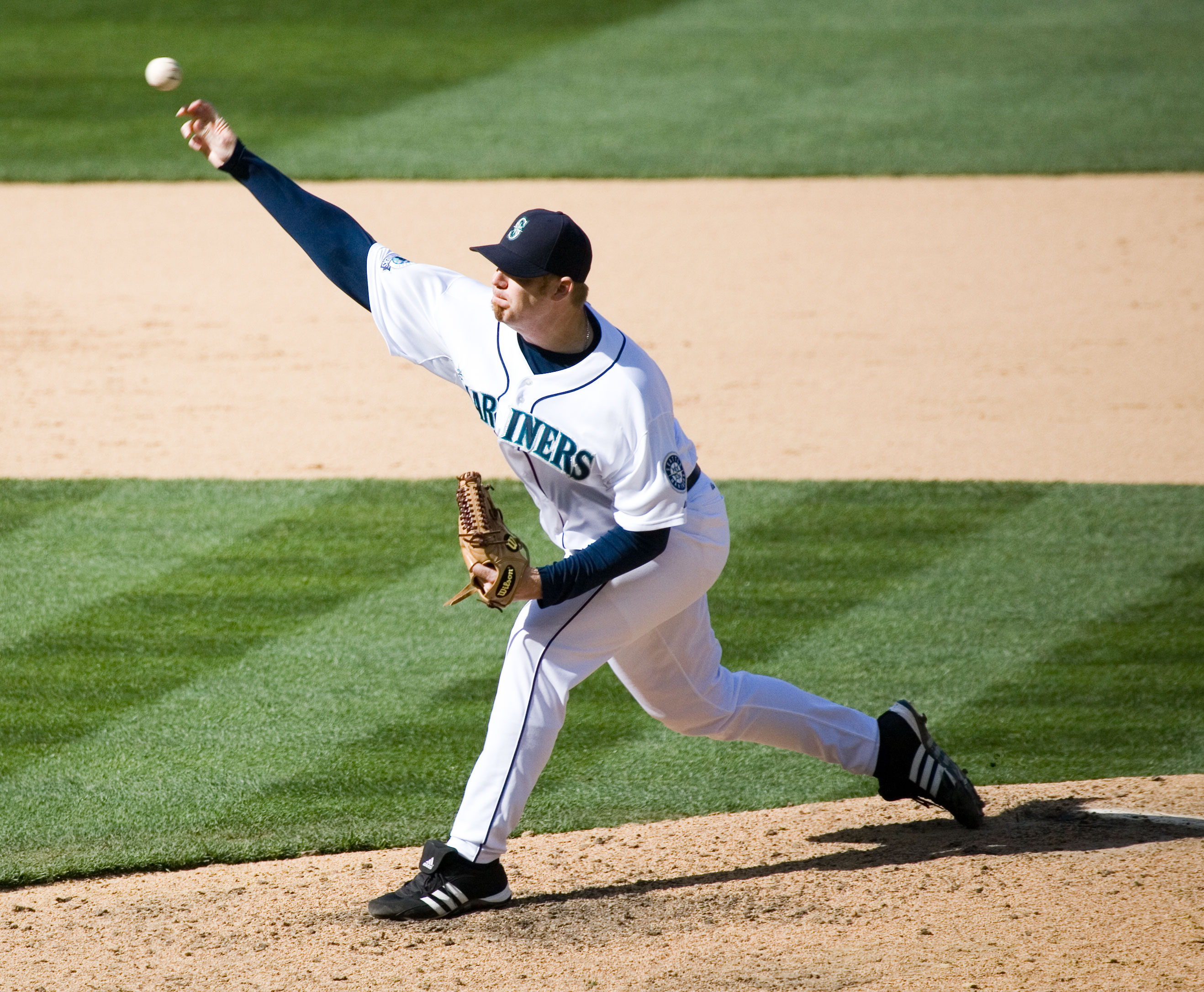
Putz with the Seattle Mariners in 2007

The Mariners selected Putz in the sixth round of the 1999 MLB draft. He made his major league debut with the Mariners on August 11, 2003. In 2006, he became the team's closer.

All through the minors, Putz had been able to throw an excellent fastball that topped out at 97 miles per hour, but had been only marginally successful because his only other pitch was a below average slider. His first few years in the majors were not terrible, but they were also nothing special. In spring training before the 2006 season, Eddie Guardado, who had been the Mariners' closer since 2004, taught him to throw a splitter. After mastering the new secondary pitch, Putz abandoned his slider and became a much improved pitcher.

A few weeks into the 2006 season, Putz took over the closing job from the aging Guardado. He converted 36 of 43 save opportunities while posting a 2.30 ERA and striking out 104 in 78.1 innings of work.

In 2007, Putz continued to improve his game. He made an All-Star appearance, where he was given a save opportunity. He converted 40 saves in 42 save opportunities with a 1.38 ERA, 0.698 WHIP, 82 strikeouts and 13 walks in 71 2/3 innings. On July 6, 2007, he was named the June 2007 winner of the Delivery Man of the Month Award, recognizing the top relief pitcher for the month. On September 25, Putz was named as one of 10 finalists for the Delivery Man of the Year Award. On July 14, Putz broke Guardado's Mariners' consecutive saves record. The streak ended at 30 consecutive saves. In 2007, he also became the first Mariner ever to win the Rolaids Relief Man Award.

=== New York Mets ===
On December 10, 2008, Putz was part of a three-team, twelve-player trade that sent him to the New York Mets in exchange for pitcher Aaron Heilman, utility outfielder Endy Chávez, and prospects. He made his Mets debut on April 6, 2009 against the Cincinnati Reds, pitching a hitless inning. After a disappointing 2009 season, on November 6, the Mets declined to exercise Putz's 2010 team option, thus making him a free agent.

=== Chicago White Sox ===
On December 11, 2009, Putz signed a one-year, $3 million contract with the Chicago White Sox. In 2010, he set a White Sox franchise record by pitching 27 consecutive scoreless outings.

=== Arizona Diamondbacks ===
On December 7, 2010, the Arizona Diamondbacks agreed to sign Putz to a 2-year, $10 million deal with a $6.5 million club option for 2013. He earned $4 million in 2011, $4.5 million in 2012, and his option had a $1.5 million buyout.

On October 20, 2012, the Diamondbacks exercised his $6.5 million option. On June 20, 2014, Putz was designated for assignment. He was released on June 27. Putz rejoined the Diamondbacks as a special assistant to club president Derrick Hall in November.

== Pitching style ==
Putz threw a mix of five pitches. He led with four-seam and two-seam fastballs (the latter to lefties, mainly) that were once in the upper 90s, but had settled in the 90–94 mph range. His main off-speed pitch was a splitter in the mid 80s. He also threw a handful of cutters and sliders, primarily to right-handed hitters.

== Personal life ==
Putz was first nicknamed "The Big Guy", by Seattle Mariners broadcaster Dave Niehaus. Putz shared a dorm with football quarterback Tom Brady while at the University of Michigan. He married Kelsey Kollen-Putz in 2002. They have four children.

== See also ==
Preceded by Dan Haren	American League Pitcher of the month June 2007	Succeeded by Érik Bédard
