= Rolaids Relief Man Award =

Former annual Major League Baseball award

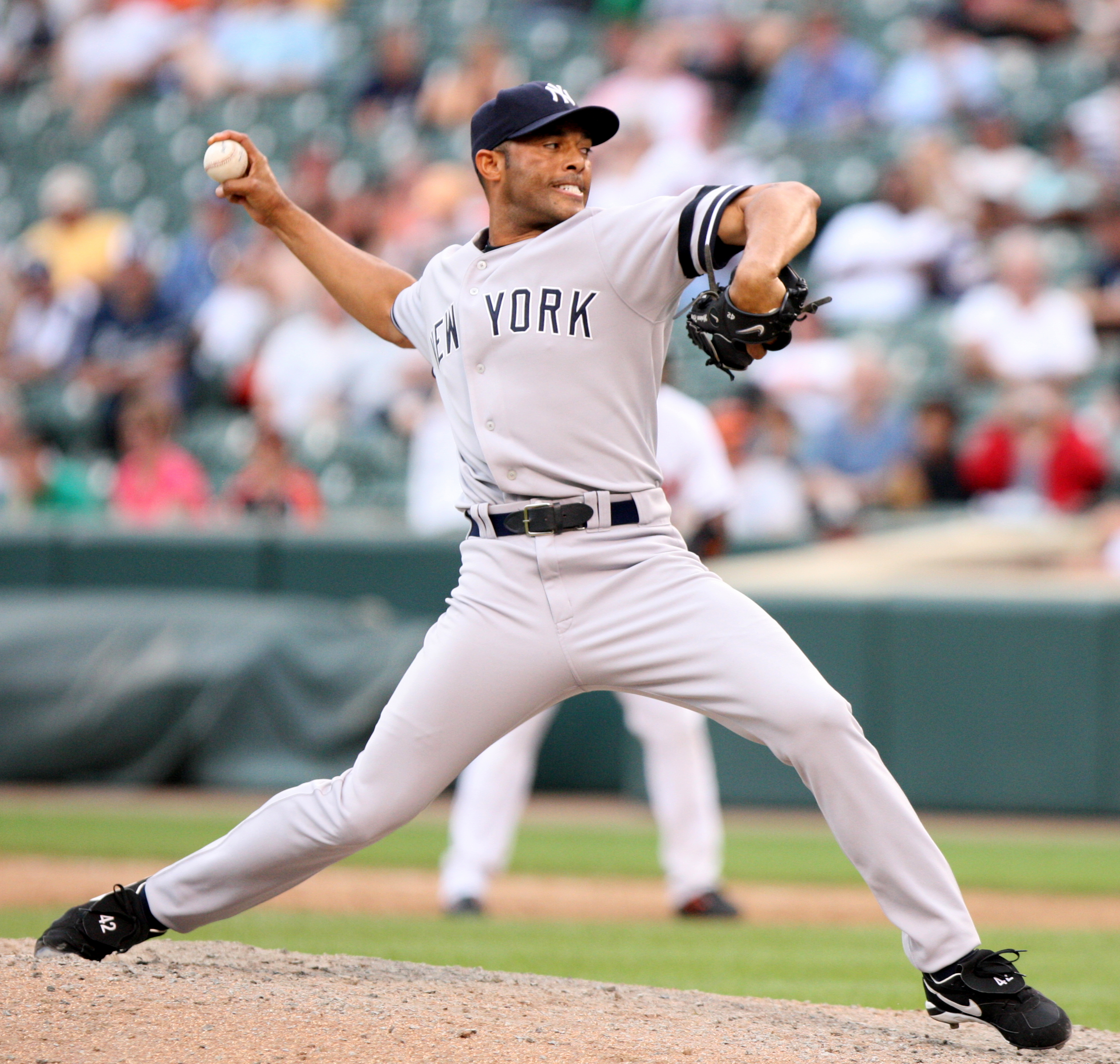
- Mariano Rivera won the AL Relief Man Award in 1999, 2001, 2004, 2005, and 2009.
- Sport: Baseball
- League: Major League Baseball
- Awarded for: Best relief pitcher in the American League and National League
- Sponsored by: Rolaids

History
- First award: 1976
- Final award: 2012
- Most wins: 5, shared by Mariano Rivera and Dan Quisenberry

The Rolaids Relief Man Award was an annual Major League Baseball (MLB) award given from 1976 to 2012 to the top relief pitchers of the regular season, one in the American League (AL) and one in the National League (NL).

Relief pitchers enter the game after the starting pitcher is removed. The award was sponsored by the antacid brand Rolaids, whose slogan was "R-O-L-A-I-D-S spells relief." Because the first closers were nicknamed "firemen", a reference to "putting out the fire" of another team's rally, the trophy was a gold-plated firefighter's helmet.

Statistical performance determined the winner, unlike the voting bodies that chose the recipients of the Cy Young Award and the MLB Most Valuable Player (MVP) Award. Each save was worth three points; each win was worth two points; and each loss was worth negative two points. Beginning with the 1988 MLB season, negative two points were given for blown saves. In the 2000 MLB season, Rolaids added an additional point for a "tough save": when a relief pitcher got the save after entering the game with the potential tying run on base. The player with the highest point total won the award.

The first winners were Bill Campbell (AL) and Rawly Eastwick (NL); Campbell also won in the following season. Dan Quisenberry and Mariano Rivera each won the AL award five times, while Rollie Fingers and Bruce Sutter won the award four times each. Lee Smith won the award on three occasions; Campbell, Dennis Eckersley, Dave Righetti, John Franco, Éric Gagné, Randy Myers, Trevor Hoffman, Francisco Rodríguez, Heath Bell, and José Valverde each won the award twice. Sutter (NL 1979), Fingers (AL 1981), Steve Bedrosian (NL 1987), Mark Davis (NL 1989), Eckersley (AL 1992), and Gagné (NL 2003) won the Relief Man and the Cy Young Award in the same season; Fingers and Eckersley won the AL MVP as well, in 1981 and 1992 respectively. Todd Worrell won both the Relief Man and the MLB Rookie of the Year Award in the 1986 MLB season. Rivera and Joe Nathan were the only relief pitchers to have tied in points for the award, and both received the award in 2009. Goose Gossage, Fingers, Eckersley, Hoffman, Rivera, Smith, John Smoltz, Sutter, and Billy Wagner were elected to the Baseball Hall of Fame. Craig Kimbrel (NL) and Jim Johnson (AL) were the final award winners in 2012.

In 2013, Sanofi acquired Rolaids from Johnson & Johnson unit McNeil Consumer Healthcare and canceled the award. The awards were issued concurrently with the Delivery Man of the Year Award, given to the best closer in MLB from 2005 and 2013. In 2014, MLB began issuing a similar award, the Reliever of the Year.

== Winners ==
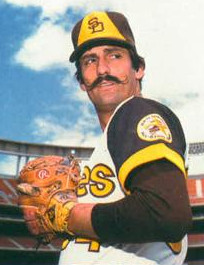
Rollie Fingers won the NL Relief Man Award in 1977, 1978, and 1980, and the AL Relief Man in 1981.

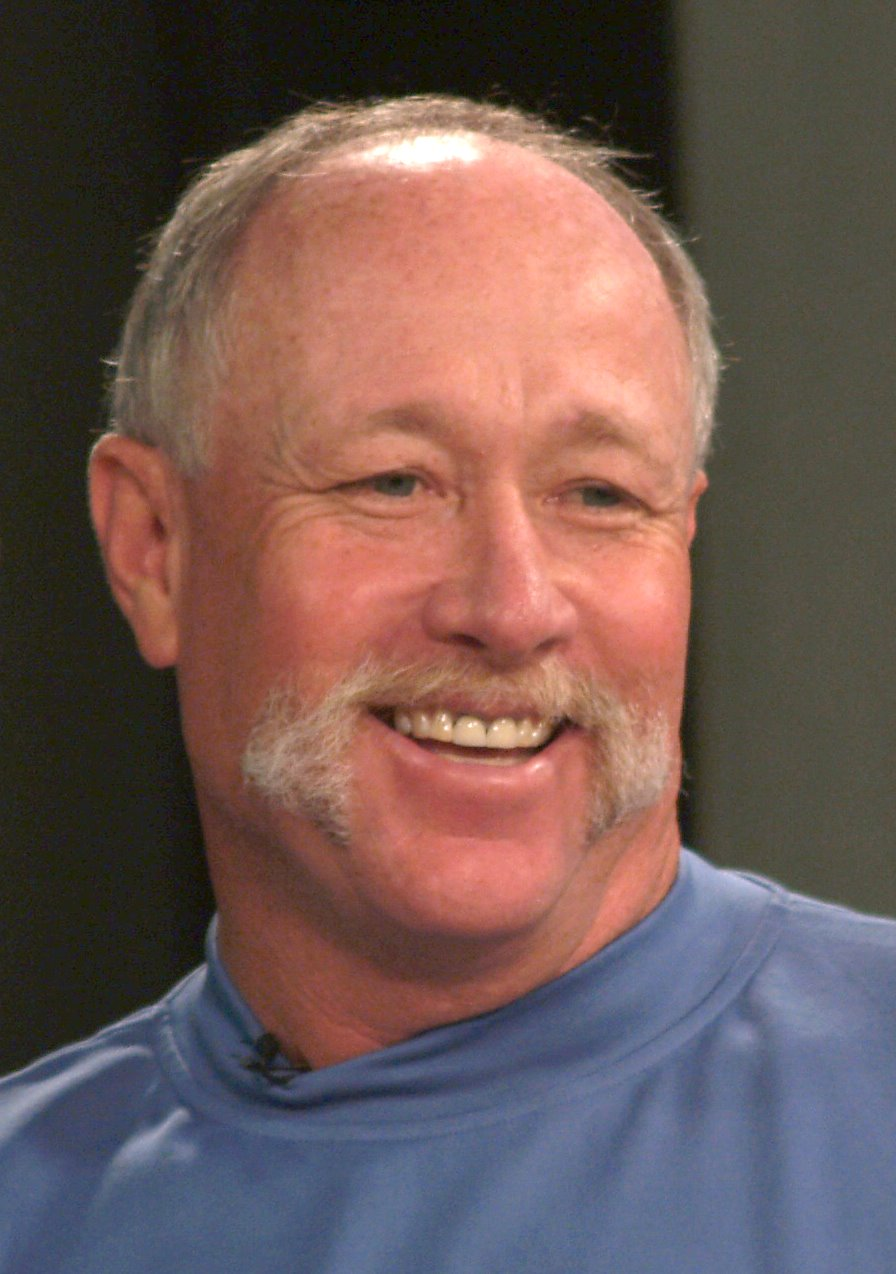
Goose Gossage won the AL Relief Man Award in 1978.

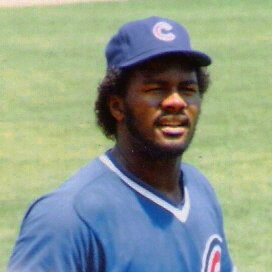
Lee Smith won the NL Relief Man Award in 1991 and 1992 and the AL Relief Man Award in 1994.

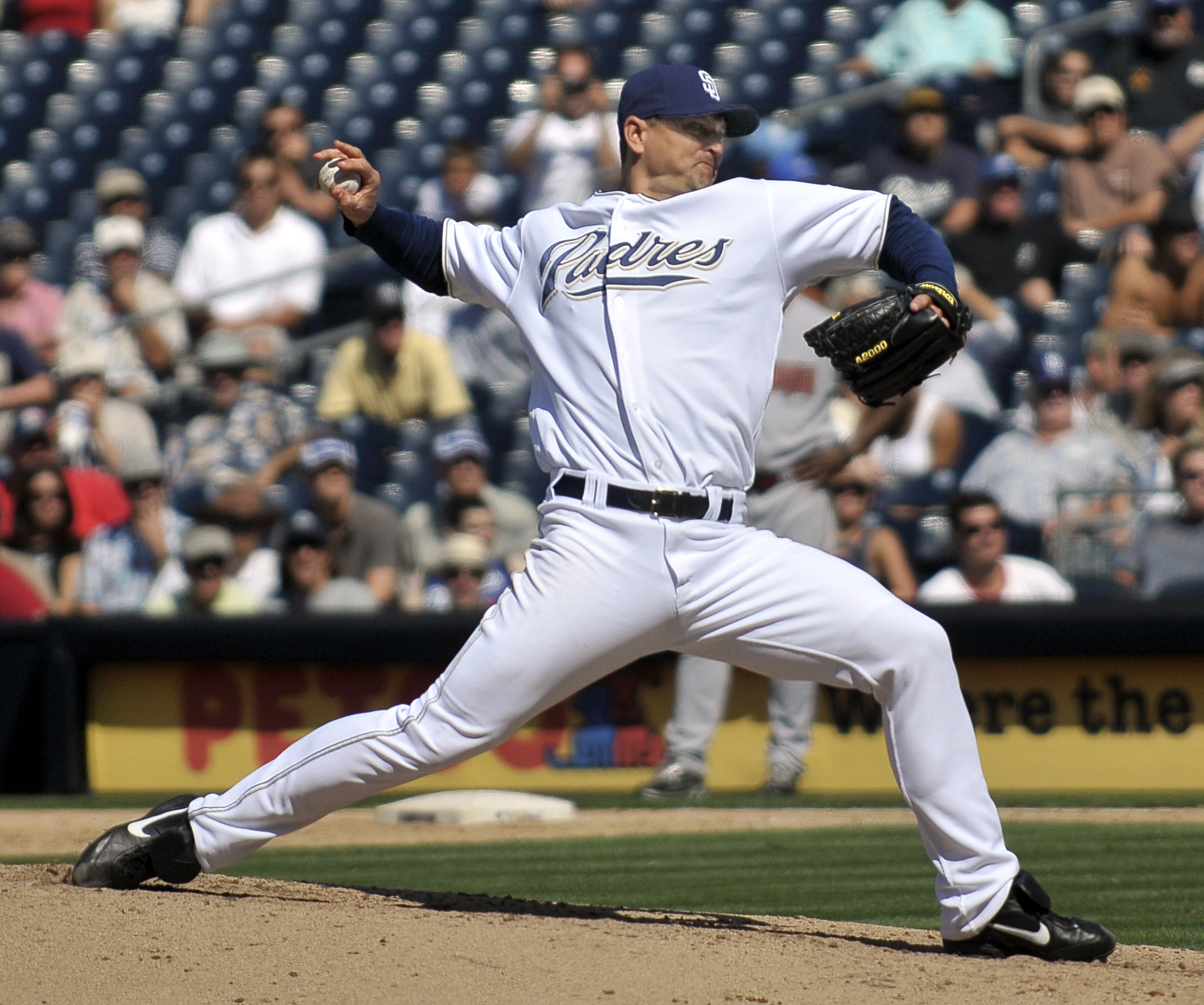
Trevor Hoffman won the NL Relief Man Award in 1998 and 2006.

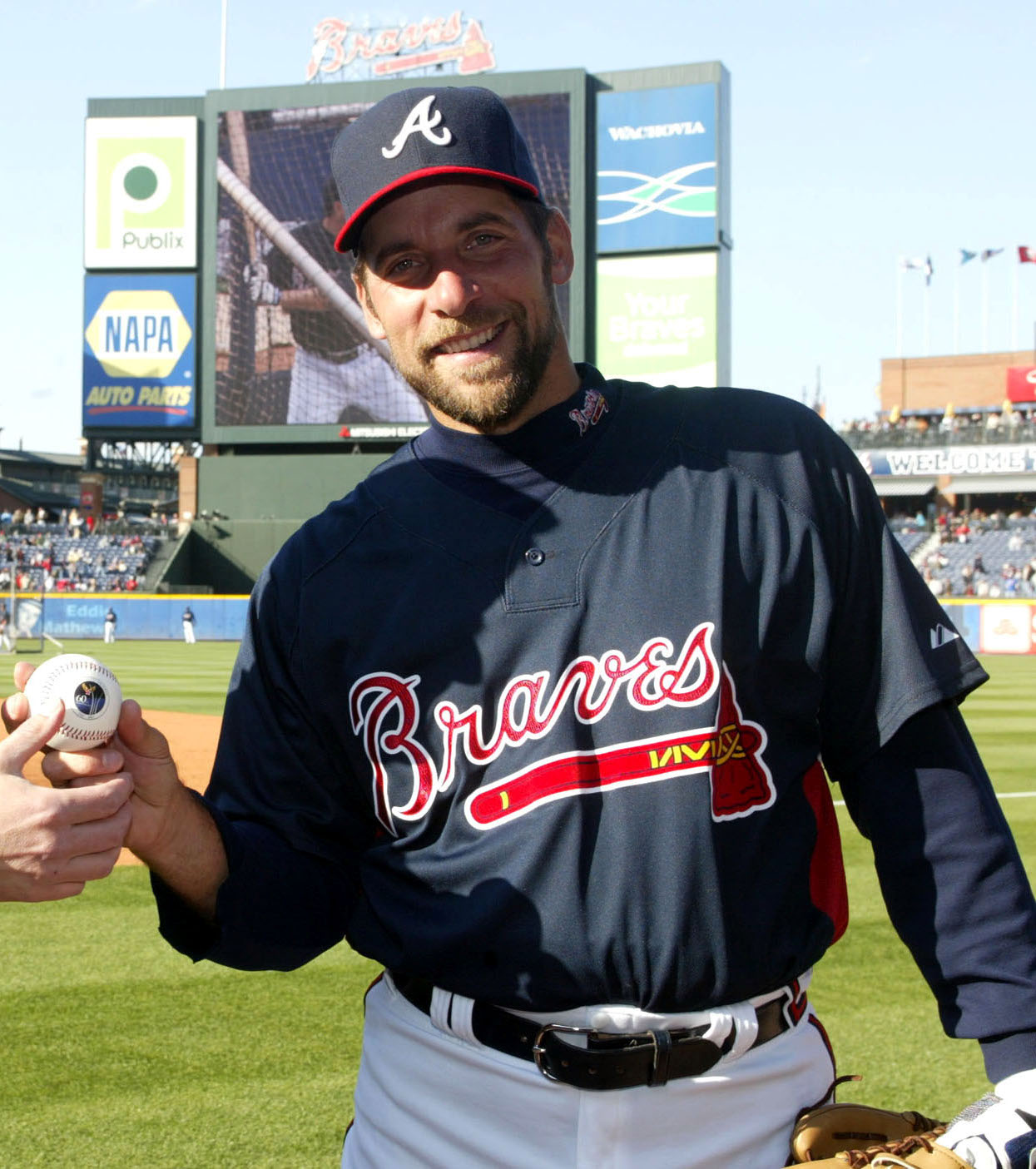
John Smoltz won the NL Relief Man Award in 2002.

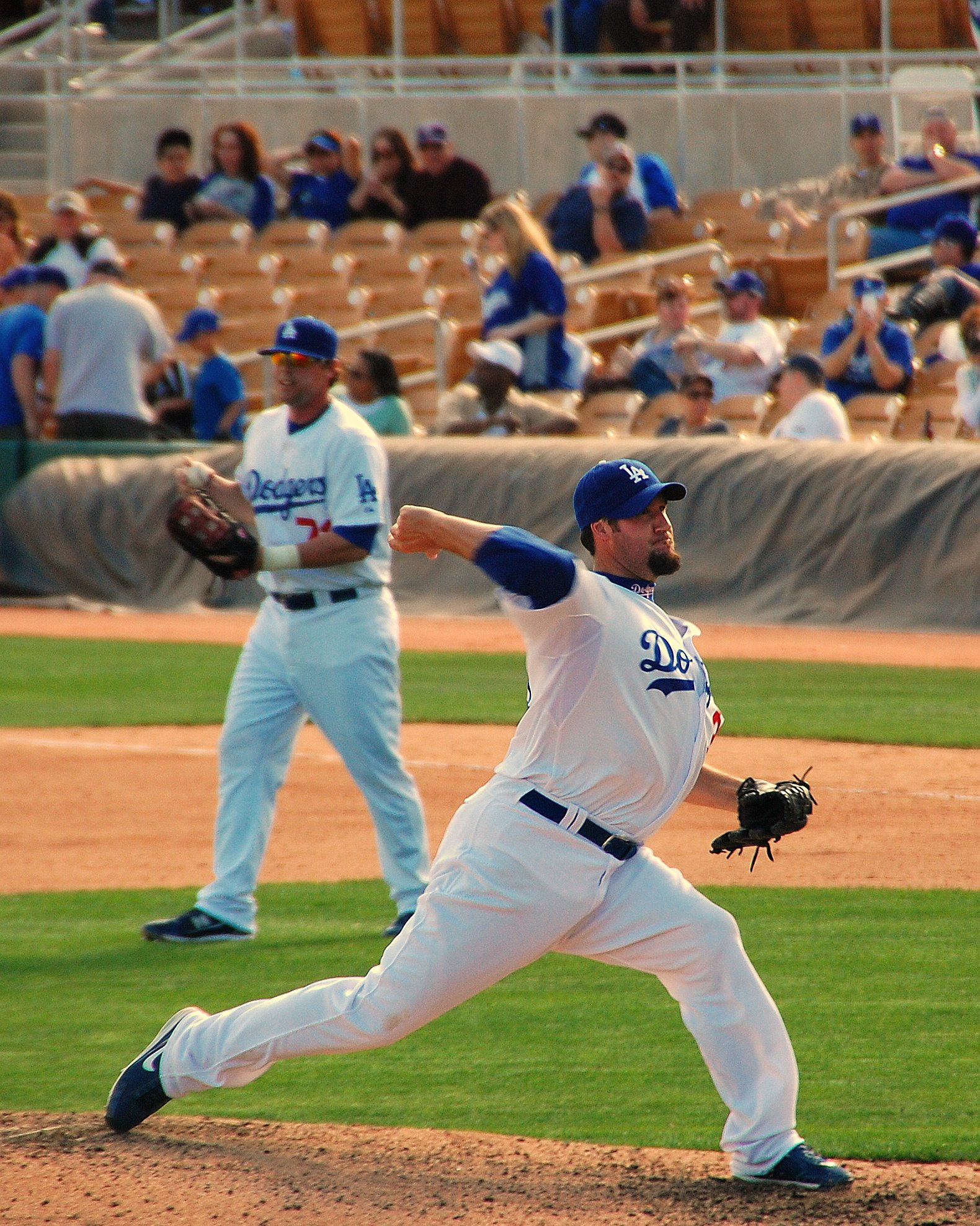
Éric Gagné won the NL Relief Man Award in 2003 and 2004.

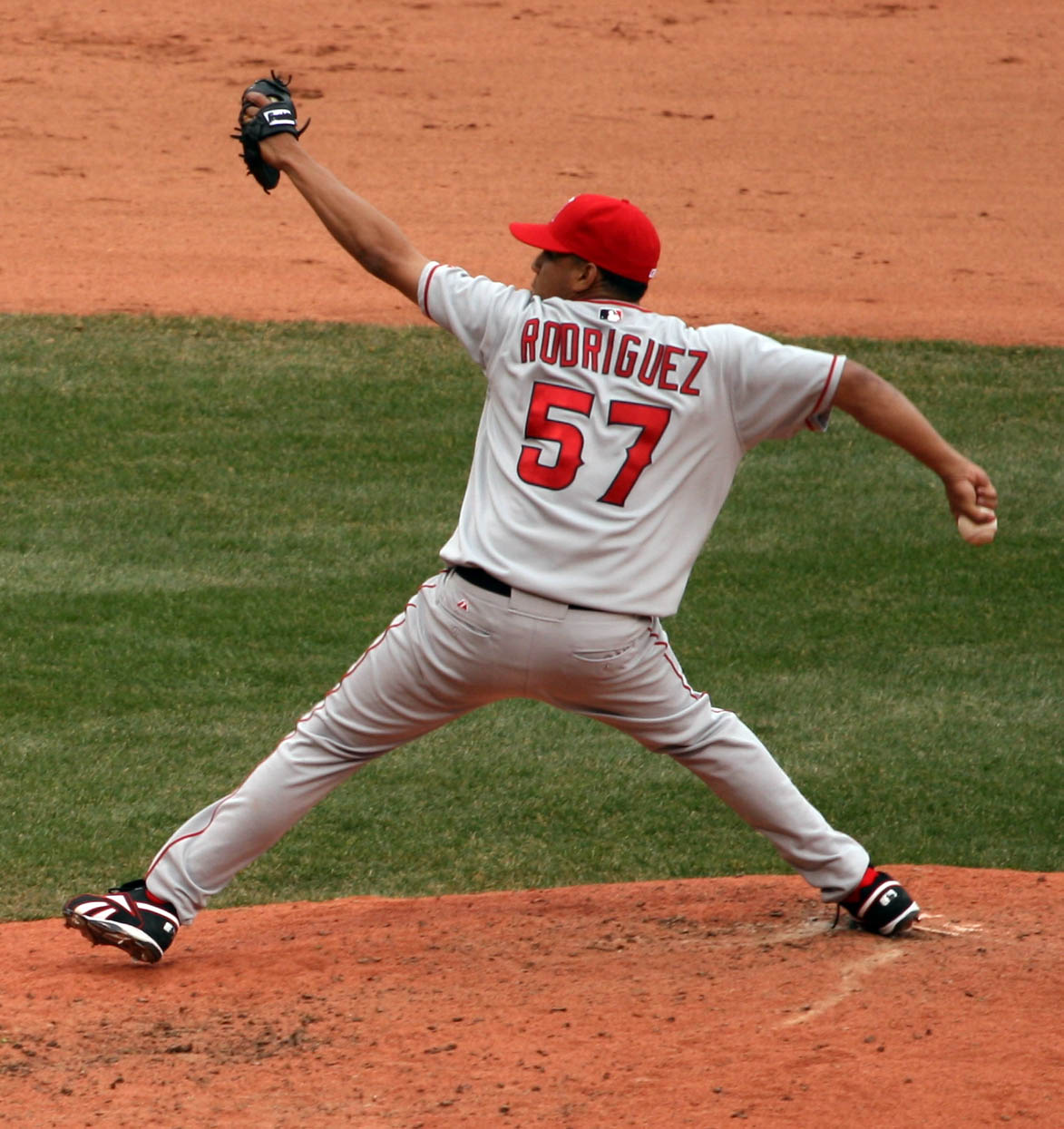
Francisco Rodriguez won the AL Relief Man Award in 2006 and 2008.

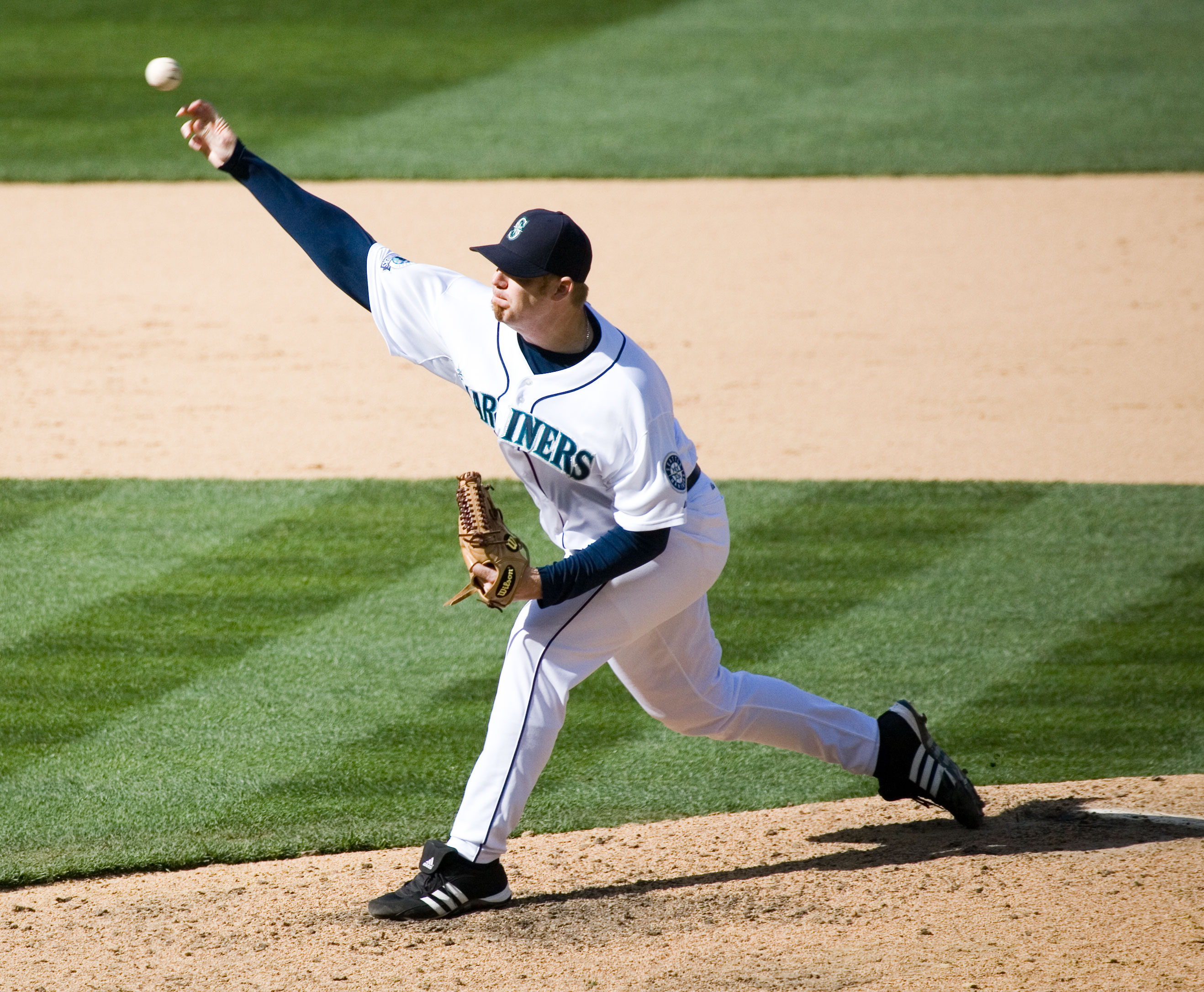
J. J. Putz won the AL Relief Man Award in 2007.

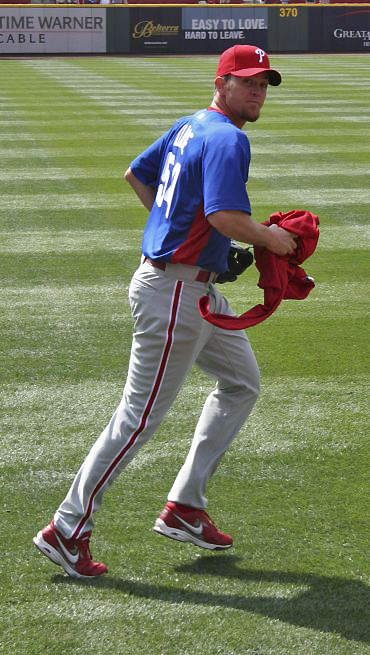
Brad Lidge won the NL Relief Man Award in 2008.

| W | Wins |
| L | Losses |
| SV | Saves |
| TS | Tough saves |
| BS | Blown saves |
| ERA | Earned run average |
| WHIP | Walks plus hits per inning pitched |
| Pitcher (#) | Winning pitcher and the number of times they had won the award at that point |
| * | Player who is still active |
| † | Elected to the Baseball Hall of Fame |
| ‡ | Denotes multiple winners in a single year |

=== National League (1976–2012) ===
| Year | Pitcher | Team | W–L | SV | TS | BS | ERA | WHIP |
|---|---|---|---|---|---|---|---|---|
| 1976 | Rawly Eastwick | Cincinnati Reds | 11–5 | 26 | — | — | 2.09 | 1.115 |
| 1977 | Rollie Fingers^{†} | San Diego Padres | 8–9 | 35 | — | — | 2.99 | 1.202 |
| 1978 | Rollie Fingers^{†} (2) | San Diego Padres | 6–13 | 37 | — | — | 2.52 | 1.053 |
| 1979 | Bruce Sutter^{†} ^{[b]} | Chicago Cubs | 6–6 | 37 | — | — | 2.22 | 0.977 |
| 1980 | Rollie Fingers^{†} (3) | San Diego Padres | 11–9 | 23 | — | — | 2.80 | 1.291 |
| 1981 | Bruce Sutter^{†} (2) | St. Louis Cardinals | 3–5 | 25 | — | — | 2.62 | 1.069 |
| 1982 | Bruce Sutter^{†} (3) | St. Louis Cardinals | 9–8 | 36 | — | — | 2.90 | 1.192 |
| 1983 | Al Holland | Philadelphia Phillies | 8–4 | 25 | — | — | 2.26 | 1.015 |
| 1984 | Bruce Sutter^{†} (4) | St. Louis Cardinals | 5–7 | 45 | — | — | 1.54 | 1.076 |
| 1985 | Jeff Reardon | Montreal Expos | 2–8 | 41 | — | — | 3.18 | 1.072 |
| 1986 | Todd Worrell^{[c]} | St. Louis Cardinals | 9–10 | 36 | — | — | 2.08 | 1.225 |
| 1987 | Steve Bedrosian^{[b]} | Philadelphia Phillies | 5–3 | 40 | — | 8 | 2.83 | 1.202 |
| 1988 | John Franco | Cincinnati Reds | 6–6 | 39 | — | 3 | 1.57 | 1.012 |
| 1989 | Mark Davis^{[b]} | San Diego Padres | 4–3 | 44 | — | 4 | 1.84 | 1.047 |
| 1990 | John Franco (2) | New York Mets | 5–3 | 33 | — | 6 | 2.53 | 1.286 |
| 1991 | Lee Smith^{†} | St. Louis Cardinals | 6–3 | 47 | — | 6 | 2.34 | 1.137 |
| 1992 | Lee Smith^{†} (2) | St. Louis Cardinals | 4–9 | 43 | — | 8 | 3.12 | 1.173 |
| 1993 | Randy Myers | Chicago Cubs | 2–4 | 53 | — | 6 | 3.11 | 1.208 |
| 1994 | Rod Beck | San Francisco Giants | 2–4 | 28 | — | 0 | 2.77 | 1.274 |
| 1995 | Tom Henke | St. Louis Cardinals | 1–1 | 36 | — | 2 | 1.82 | 1.104 |
| 1996 | Jeff Brantley | Cincinnati Reds | 1–2 | 44 | — | 5 | 2.41 | 1.155 |
| 1997 | Jeff Shaw | Cincinnati Reds | 4–2 | 42 | — | 1 | 2.38 | 0.961 |
| 1998 | Trevor Hoffman^{†} | San Diego Padres | 4–2 | 53 | — | 1 | 1.48 | 0.936 |
| 1999 | Billy Wagner^{†} | Houston Astros | 4–1 | 39 | — | 3 | 1.57 | 0.777 |
| 2000 | Antonio Alfonseca | Florida Marlins | 5–6 | 45 | 0 | 4 | 4.24 | 1.514 |
| 2001 | Armando Benítez | New York Mets | 6–4 | 43 | 3 | 3 | 3.77 | 1.297 |
| 2002 | John Smoltz^{†} | Atlanta Braves | 3–2 | 55 | 5 | 4 | 3.25 | 1.033 |
| 2003 | Éric Gagné^{[b]} | Los Angeles Dodgers | 2–3 | 55 | 2 | 0 | 1.20 | 0.692 |
| 2004 | Éric Gagné (2) | Los Angeles Dodgers | 7–3 | 45 | 3 | 2 | 2.19 | 0.911 |
| 2005 | Chad Cordero | Washington Nationals | 2–4 | 47 | 2 | 7 | 1.82 | 0.969 |
| 2006 | Trevor Hoffman^{†} (2) | San Diego Padres | 0–2 | 46 | 0 | 5 | 2.14 | 0.968 |
| 2007 | José Valverde | Arizona Diamondbacks | 1–4 | 47 | 1 | 7 | 2.66 | 1.119 |
| 2008 | Brad Lidge | Philadelphia Phillies | 2–0 | 41 | 0 | 0 | 1.95 | 1.226 |
| 2009 | Heath Bell | San Diego Padres | 6–4 | 42 | 3 | 6 | 2.71 | 1.120 |
| 2010 | Heath Bell (2) | San Diego Padres | 6–1 | 47 | 5 | 3 | 1.93 | 1.200 |
| 2011 | John Axford | Milwaukee Brewers | 2–2 | 46 | 0 | 2 | 1.95 | 1.140 |
| 2012 | Craig Kimbrel* | Atlanta Braves | 3–1 | 42 | 1 | 3 | 1.01 | 0.654 |

=== American League (1976–2012) ===
| Year | Pitcher | Team | W–L | SV | TS | BS | ERA | WHIP |
|---|---|---|---|---|---|---|---|---|
| 1976 | Bill Campbell | Minnesota Twins | 17–5 | 20 | — | — | 3.01 | 1.235 |
| 1977 | Bill Campbell (2) | Boston Red Sox | 13–9 | 31 | — | — | 2.96 | 1.229 |
| 1978 | Goose Gossage^{†} | New York Yankees | 10–11 | 27 | — | — | 2.01 | 1.087 |
| 1979 | Jim Kern | Texas Rangers | 13–5 | 29 | — | — | 1.57 | 1.126 |
| 1980 | Dan Quisenberry | Kansas City Royals | 12–7 | 33 | — | — | 3.09 | 1.216 |
| 1981 | Rollie Fingers^{†} (4)^{[a]} | Milwaukee Brewers | 6–3 | 28 | — | — | 1.04 | 0.872 |
| 1982 | Dan Quisenberry (2) | Kansas City Royals | 9–7 | 35 | — | — | 2.57 | 1.010 |
| 1983 | Dan Quisenberry (3) | Kansas City Royals | 5–3 | 45 | — | — | 1.94 | 0.928 |
| 1984 | Dan Quisenberry (4) | Kansas City Royals | 6–3 | 44 | — | — | 2.65 | 1.028 |
| 1985 | Dan Quisenberry (5) | Kansas City Royals | 8–9 | 37 | — | — | 2.37 | 1.225 |
| 1986 | Dave Righetti | New York Yankees | 8–8 | 46 | — | — | 2.45 | 1.153 |
| 1987 | Dave Righetti (2) | New York Yankees | 8–6 | 31 | — | 13 | 3.51 | 1.463 |
| 1988 | Dennis Eckersley^{†} | Oakland Athletics | 4–2 | 45 | — | 8 | 2.35 | 0.867 |
| 1989 | Jeff Russell | Texas Rangers | 6–4 | 38 | — | 6 | 1.98 | 0.950 |
| 1990 | Bobby Thigpen | Chicago White Sox | 4–6 | 57 | — | 8 | 1.83 | 1.038 |
| 1991 | Bryan Harvey | California Angels | 2–4 | 46 | — | 6 | 1.60 | 0.864 |
| 1992 | Dennis Eckersley^{†} (2)^{[a]} | Oakland Athletics | 7–1 | 51 | — | 3 | 1.91 | 0.913 |
| 1993 | Jeff Montgomery | Kansas City Royals | 7–5 | 45 | — | 6 | 2.27 | 1.008 |
| 1994 | Lee Smith^{†} (3) | Baltimore Orioles | 1–4 | 33 | — | 6 | 3.29 | 1.174 |
| 1995 | José Mesa | Cleveland Indians | 3–0 | 46 | — | 2 | 1.12 | 1.031 |
| 1996 | John Wetteland | New York Yankees | 2–3 | 43 | — | 4 | 2.83 | 1.178 |
| 1997 | Randy Myers (2) | Baltimore Orioles | 2–3 | 45 | — | 1 | 1.51 | 1.156 |
| 1998 | Tom Gordon | Boston Red Sox | 7–4 | 46 | — | 1 | 2.72 | 1.008 |
| 1999 | Mariano Rivera^{†} | New York Yankees | 4–3 | 45 | — | 4 | 1.83 | 0.884 |
| 2000 | Todd Jones | Detroit Tigers | 2–4 | 42 | 4 | 4 | 3.52 | 1.438 |
| 2001 | Mariano Rivera^{†} (2) | New York Yankees | 4–6 | 50 | 3 | 7 | 2.34 | 0.905 |
| 2002 | Billy Koch | Oakland Athletics | 11–4 | 44 | 2 | 6 | 3.27 | 1.270 |
| 2003 | Keith Foulke | Oakland Athletics | 9–1 | 43 | 4 | 5 | 2.08 | 0.888 |
| 2004 | Mariano Rivera^{†} (3) | New York Yankees | 4–2 | 53 | 2 | 4 | 1.94 | 1.081 |
| 2005 | Mariano Rivera^{†} (4) | New York Yankees | 7–4 | 43 | 5 | 4 | 1.38 | 0.868 |
| 2006 | Francisco Rodriguez | Los Angeles Angels | 2–3 | 47 | 3 | 4 | 1.73 | 1.096 |
| 2007 | J. J. Putz | Seattle Mariners | 6–1 | 40 | 8 | 2 | 1.38 | 0.698 |
| 2008 | Francisco Rodriguez (2) | Los Angeles Angels | 2–3 | 62 | 1 | 7 | 2.24 | 1.288 |
| 2009‡ | Mariano Rivera^{†} (5) | New York Yankees | 3–3 | 44 | 4 | 2 | 1.76 | 0.905 |
| 2009‡ | Joe Nathan | Minnesota Twins | 2–2 | 47 | 1 | 5 | 2.10 | 0.932 |
| 2010 | Rafael Soriano | Tampa Bay Rays | 3–2 | 45 | 0 | 3 | 1.73 | 0.802 |
| 2011 | José Valverde (2) | Detroit Tigers | 2–4 | 49 | 0 | 0 | 2.24 | 1.190 |
| 2012 | Jim Johnson | Baltimore Orioles | 2–1 | 51 | 0 | 3 | 2.49 | 1.019 |

== Notes ==
^{a} Won Cy Young Award and MLB Most Valuable Player Award in the same season.
^{b} Won Cy Young Award in the same season.
^{c} Won MLB Rookie of the Year Award in the same season.

== See also ==
- Major League Baseball Reliever of the Year Award (2014–present; one in each league)
- Major League Baseball Delivery Man of the Year Award (2005–2013; one for all of MLB)
- Sporting News Relief Pitcher of the Year Award) (2013–present; one in each league)
- Sporting News Reliever of the Year Award (1960–2010; one in each league)
- Baseball Writers' Association of America Relief Pitcher of the Year Award
- Baseball awards
- List of MLB awards
