= Craig Kimbrel =

American baseball player (born 1988)

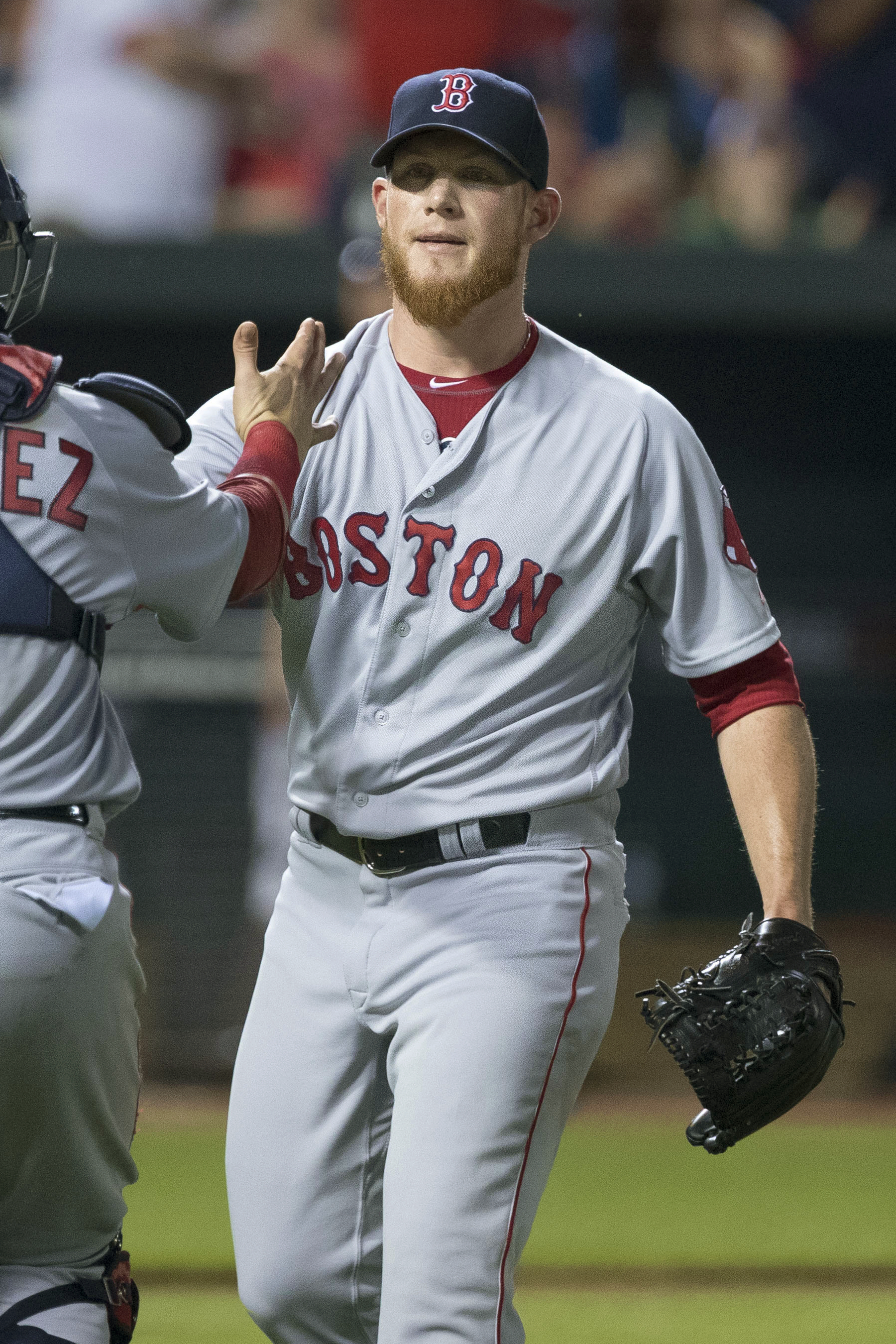
- Kimbrel with the Boston Red Sox in 2016

Free agent
- Pitcher
- Born: May 28, 1988 (age 38); Huntsville, Alabama, U.S.
- Bats: Right Throws: Right

MLB debut
- May 7, 2010, for the Atlanta Braves

MLB statistics (through 2026 season)
- Win–loss record: 57–53
- Earned run average: 2.69
- Strikeouts: 1,322
- Saves: 441
- Stats at Baseball Reference

Teams
- Atlanta Braves (2010–2014); San Diego Padres (2015); Boston Red Sox (2016–2018); Chicago Cubs (2019–2021); Chicago White Sox (2021); Los Angeles Dodgers (2022); Philadelphia Phillies (2023); Baltimore Orioles (2024); Atlanta Braves (2025); Houston Astros (2025); New York Mets (2026); Tampa Bay Rays (2026); Kansas City Royals (2026)

Career highlights and awards
- 9× All-Star (2011–2014, 2016–2018, 2021, 2023); World Series champion (2018); NL Rookie of the Year (2011); NL Rolaids Relief Man Award (2012); Delivery Man of the Year (2013); 2× Reliever of the Year (2014, 2017); 4× NL saves leader (2011–2014); Pitched a combined no-hitter on June 24, 2021

Craig Michael Kimbrel (born May 28, 1988) is an American professional baseball pitcher who is a free agent. He has played in Major League Baseball (MLB) for the Atlanta Braves, San Diego Padres, Boston Red Sox, Chicago Cubs, Chicago White Sox, Los Angeles Dodgers, Philadelphia Phillies, Baltimore Orioles, Houston Astros, New York Mets, Tampa Bay Rays, and Kansas City Royals. He is a nine-time All-Star, four-time Reliever of the Year, and a 2018 World Series champion.

As a rookie with the Braves in 2011, Kimbrel was named their closer, set an MLB record for saves by a rookie with 46, and won the National League's (NL) Rookie of the Year Award. He led the NL in saves for four consecutive seasons (2011– 2014). He recorded his 200th save in June 2015 with the Padres, and his 300th save in May 2018 with the Red Sox, making him the youngest pitcher in MLB history to reach the milestone. On May 26, 2023, Kimbrel became the eighth MLB pitcher to achieve 400 career saves.

Kimbrel pitched for the United States national team in the 2013 World Baseball Classic.

== Early life ==
Kimbrel was born on May 28, 1988, in Huntsville, Alabama, to Mike and Sandy Kimbrel. He attended Lee High School, where he played baseball and was a quarterback for the football team. In baseball, he was a teammate of Buddy Boshers.

== College career ==
Kimbrel attended Wallace State Community College. In 2007, Kimbrel had an 8–0 win–loss record with a 1.99 earned run average (ERA) as a freshman, serving as the team's closer and a spot starter. In 2008, he was 9–3 with a 2.88 ERA, striking out 123 hitters in 81 innings pitched (for an elite rate of 13.67 K/9) mainly as a reliever.

== Professional career ==
=== Drafts and minor leagues ===
The Atlanta Braves selected Kimbrel in the 33rd round of the 2007 MLB draft, but he elected to remain at Wallace State in order to improve his draft position. He was then taken by the Braves in the third round, with the 96th overall selection, of the 2008 MLB draft.

=== Atlanta Braves (2010–2014) ===
==== 2010 ====
Kimbrel got his first call-up from the Gwinnett Braves on May 15, 2010, to replace the injured Jair Jurrjens on the roster. He was called up for the second time in his career on June 4, 2010, to replace Takashi Saito, who was placed on the 15-day DL. He earned his first major league save on September 19, 2010, against the New York Mets. Kimbrel's record for the 2010 season was 4–0, with one save and a 0.44 ERA in 20 2/3 innings. He recorded 40 strikeouts and 16 walks. In the National League Division Series, he was the losing pitcher in Game 3 against the eventual World Series champion San Francisco Giants.

==== 2011: Rookie of the Year ====
Kimbrel made the roster to start the 2011 season as the team's primary closer. He was successful in his first four save opportunities before blowing his first career save on April 21. On June 3, in a game against the New York Mets, Kimbrel passed the record for most saves by a National League (NL) rookie before the All-Star break. He is the fastest Braves pitcher to reach 100 career strikeouts, doing so in 59 1/3 career innings, surpassing the previous record set by John Rocker, who needed 70 innings to reach 100 strikeouts. On July 5, Kimbrel' 26th save matched Jonathan Papelbon's MLB record for most saves by a rookie before the All-Star break. On July 7, Kimbrel's 27th save of the year against the Colorado Rockies broke Papelbon's record.

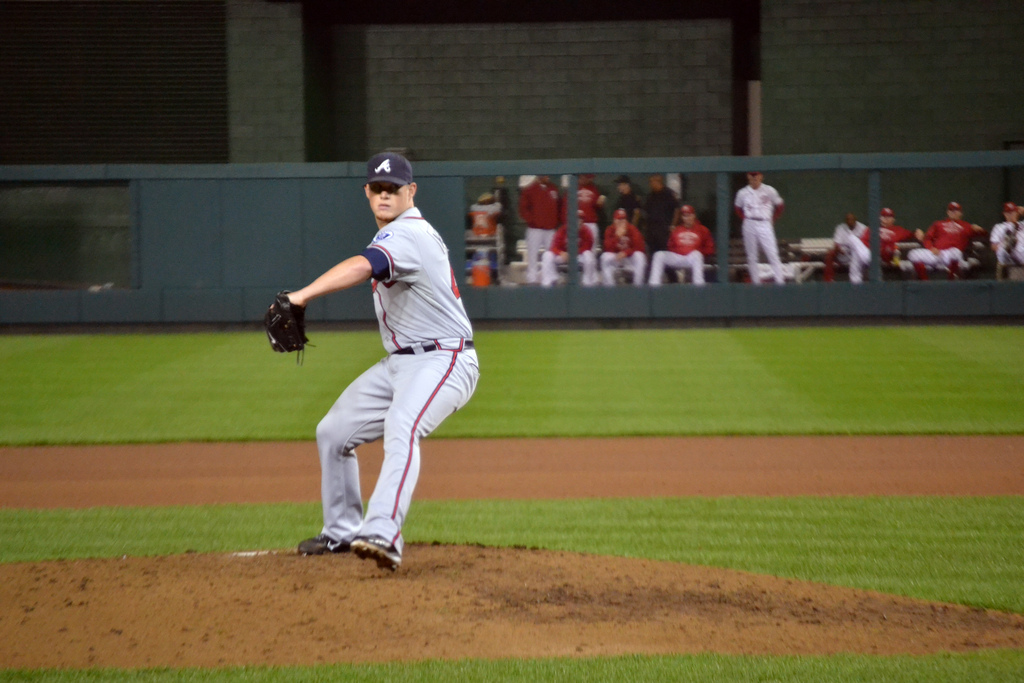
Kimbrel on the mound in 2011

Kimbrel was selected to the All Star Game as a rookie. San Francisco manager Bruce Bochy chose Kimbrel as a replacement for pitcher Matt Cain.

On July 22, in a game versus the Cincinnati Reds, Kimbrel broke the Braves rookie record for saves in a season (31). On August 9, in a game versus the Florida Marlins, Kimbrel tied the NL rookie record for saves in a season (36 by Todd Worrell of the St. Louis Cardinals in 1986). He broke that record on August 17 in a game versus San Francisco. On August 21, Kimbrel recorded his 100th strike out, his 39th save of the season, and a streak of 30 2/3 innings without yielding a run. On August 23, Kimbrel recorded his 40th save, tying the rookie save record of Neftalí Feliz. Kimbrel broke this record on August 31 with two strikeouts in a game against the Washington Nationals. At the time, he led the majors in saves and had not given up a run in his last 34 innings. The following night, Kimbrel surpassed Cliff Lee's mark of 34 scoreless innings with 34 2/3 scoreless innings for the longest scoreless streak in the majors in 2011. He was named the NL Rookie of the Month and Delivery Man of the Month for August. His scoreless inning streak came to an end after 38 1/3 innings, on September 9.

The Braves' season ended when Kimbrel blew a save against the Philadelphia Phillies in the last game of the season. The loss knocked Atlanta out of playoff contention, completing a historic late-season collapse that squandered an early September lead of 8 1/2 games in the NL Wild Card race. Kimbrel's mediocre September (4.76 ERA) led to charges that manager Fredi González had overworked him during the season.

Kimbrel ended the season tied for the NL lead with 46 saves and led major league relievers with 127 strikeouts in 77 innings.

On November 14, the Baseball Writers' Association of America announced the results of their NL Rookie of the Year vote; Kimbrel received all 32 first-place ballots—the first unanimous selection since 2001 winner Albert Pujols. Teammate Freddie Freeman finished second in the voting with 21 second-place votes and seven third-place votes, for a total of 70 points—making the pair the first teammates to take the top two spots since 1989, when the Chicago Cubs' Jerome Walton and Dwight Smith came in first and second. The only other time two Braves had finished in the top five, the organization was located in Milwaukee—Gene Conley was voted third-best rookie of the 1954 season; Hank Aaron came in fourth. Kimbrel was also named the Players Choice Awards NL Outstanding Rookie by the MLB Players Association.

==== 2012 ====
Kimbrel again made the All-Star team in 2012. He struck out the two batters he faced. He won the Delivery Man of the Month Award for September. On September 26, he struck out four batters in the ninth inning.

Kimbrel was thoroughly dominant throughout the 2012 season. He led the NL with 42 saves (in 45 opportunities) and Win Probability Added among pitchers. He struck out 116 batters in 62 2/3 innings, producing a K/9 rate of 16.7. In so doing, he also became the first pitcher in history to strike out at least half the batters he faced during a season. He also went to an 0–2 count on 56% of the batters he faced. Kimbrel allowed only 3.9 hits and 2 walks per nine innings pitched, giving him a WHIP of 0.65 and a batting average against of .126. He finished with an ERA of 1.01. He won the NL Rolaids Relief Man Award. Kimbrel finished fifth in the NL Cy Young Award voting and eighth in NL MVP voting.

==== 2013 ====
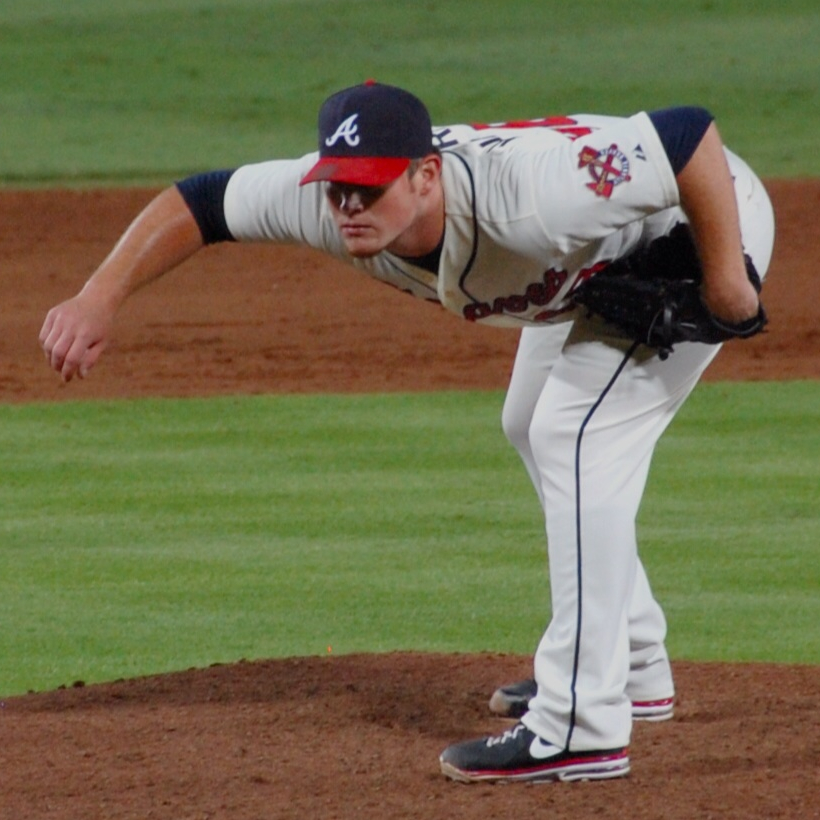
Kimbrel in his pre-pitch stance during 2013

Kimbrel began the 2013 season with three blown saves during his first nine save opportunities, tying his personal record for blown saves during the entire 2012 season. Nonetheless, on May 9, in a game against San Francisco, Kimbrel earned his 100th save, making him the second -oungest player in MLB history to reach that mark. With a save against the Cardinals on July 27, he became only the second Atlanta pitcher after John Smoltz to have three 30-save seasons. Kimbrel surpassed Smoltz's Braves record of 27 consecutive saves on August 17.

On September 27, Kimbrel recorded his 50th save of the season in a game against the Philadelphia Phillies. In doing so, he became the 11th pitcher in MLB history to have a 50-save season. He won the Delivery Man of the Year Award (across all of MLB) and also was voted the "GIBBY Awards" Closer of the Year – by the fans, media, team front-office personnel, former players, and SABR.

==== 2014 ====
On February 16, 2014, Kimbrel agreed to a four-year, $42 million extension with the Braves that ran through 2017, with an option for 2018. On April 2, Kimbrel tied Gene Garber's 141 saves with the Braves, good for second in franchise history. Two days later, on April 4, Kimbrel recorded his 142nd career save, to move into sole possession of second place. On April 25, Kimbrel became the fastest pitcher ever to reach 400 strikeouts—reaching the mark in 236 innings' worth of work. On June 6, Kimbrel recorded his 155th save in a game against the Arizona Diamondbacks, surpassing John Smoltz as the new franchise leader in saves. On August 29, Kimbrel recorded his 40th save of the season. He became the third pitcher to reach that single-season milestone in four straight seasons. (Note: Trevor Hoffman, who achieved it twice, and Francisco Rodríguez are the others.) Kimbrel finished the season with a 1.61 ERA and 95 strikeouts in 61 2/3 innings. He led the NL with 47 saves, becoming the first pitcher to lead the NL in saves for four consecutive seasons since Bruce Sutter (1979–82).

=== San Diego Padres (2015) ===
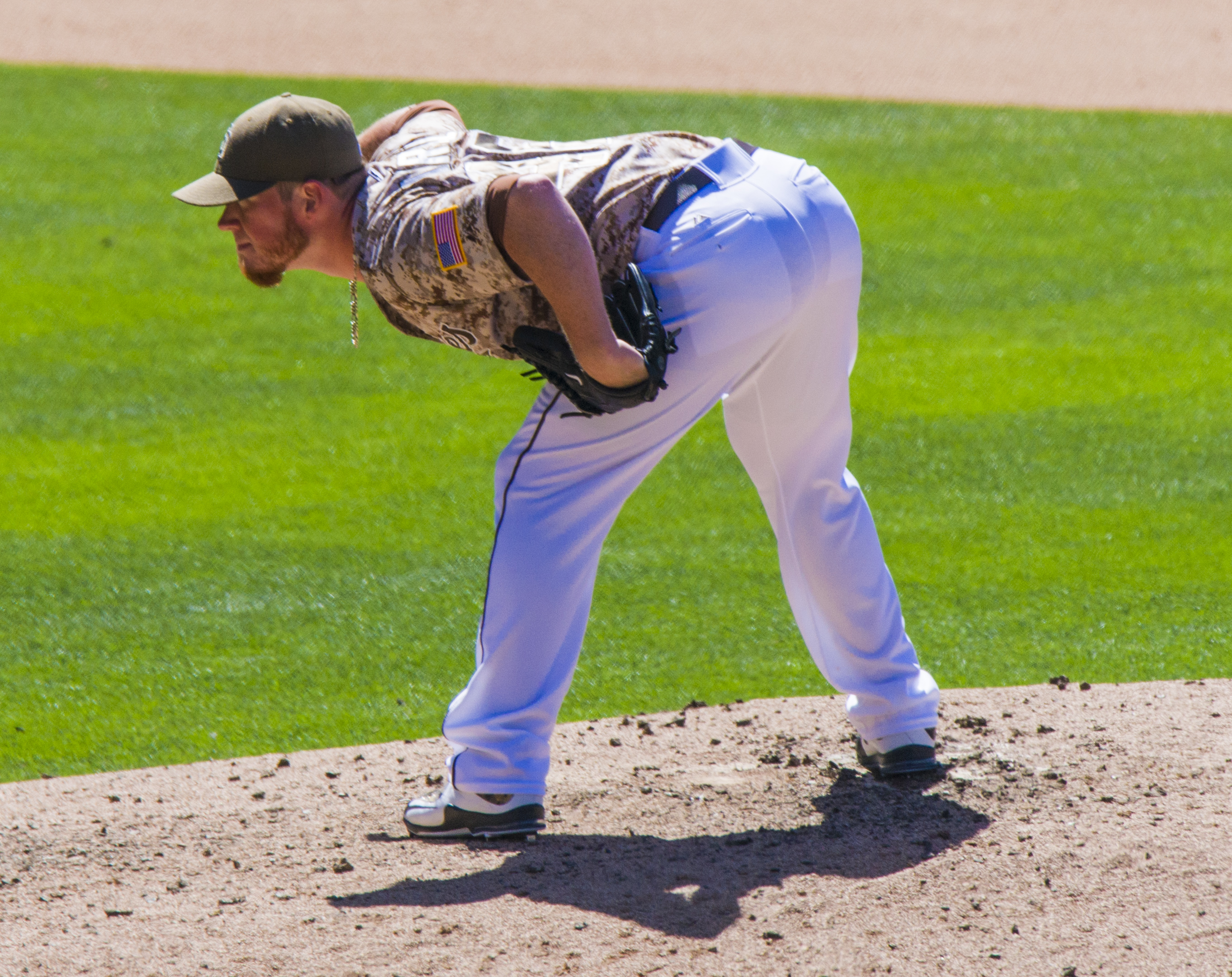
Kimbrel with the San Diego Padres in 2015.

On April 5, 2015, Kimbrel was traded to the San Diego Padres along with outfielder B. J. Upton, in exchange for Carlos Quentin, Cameron Maybin, prospects Matt Wisler, Jordan Paroubeck, and the 41st overall pick in the 2015 MLB draft.

On June 8, Kimbrel recorded his 200th career save against his former team, the Braves. He became the fastest pitcher ever to reach that milestone, taking only 318 games to do so.

In his one season with the Padres, Kimbrel made 61 appearances, finishing 53 games while recording 39 saves; he struck out 87 while walking 22 in 59 1/3 innings pitched with a 2.58 ERA.

=== Boston Red Sox (2016–2018) ===
On November 13, 2015, the Padres traded Kimbrel to the Boston Red Sox in exchange for Manuel Margot, Javy Guerra, Carlos Asuaje, and Logan Allen.

==== 2016 ====
On July 8, 2016, Kimbrel injured his knee while taking warmups. The next day, an MRI revealed that there was a tear in the medial meniscus of the left knee. The injury required surgery, and three to six weeks to recover. He returned to the bullpen from the injured list (IL) at the start of August. Kimbrel was named to the All-Star Game, which he missed due to the injury.

For the 2016 Red Sox, Kimbrel made 57 regular season appearances, finishing 47 games while recording 31 saves. In 53 innings pitched, he had a 3.40 ERA while striking out 83 and walking 30.

In the 2016 American League Division Series (ALDS), Kimbrel made two appearances; he retired all four batters he faced, three by strikeout, as the Red Sox were swept by the Cleveland Indians.

==== 2017 ====
On May 11, 2017, against the Milwaukee Brewers at Miller Park, Kimbrel struck out the side in the ninth inning on nine consecutive pitches, joining Pedro Martínez and Clay Buchholz as the only pitchers in franchise history to pitch an immaculate inning. Two weeks later, Kimbrel recorded a second four-strikeout inning while facing the Texas Rangers. Kimbrel was subsequently named American League (AL) Reliever of the Month for May.

For the 2017 Red Sox, Kimbrel made 67 regular season appearances, finishing 51 games while recording 35 saves. In 69 innings pitched, he had a 1.43 ERA while striking out 126 and walking 14. Of all MLB pitchers, he held right-handed batters to the lowest batting average, .108 (in 30 or more innings).

In the 2017 ALDS, Kimbrel made two one-inning appearances; he faced a total of 12 batters, giving up four hits, one walk, and one run while recording two strikeouts, as the Red Sox lost to the eventual World Series champions Houston Astros.

==== 2018 ====
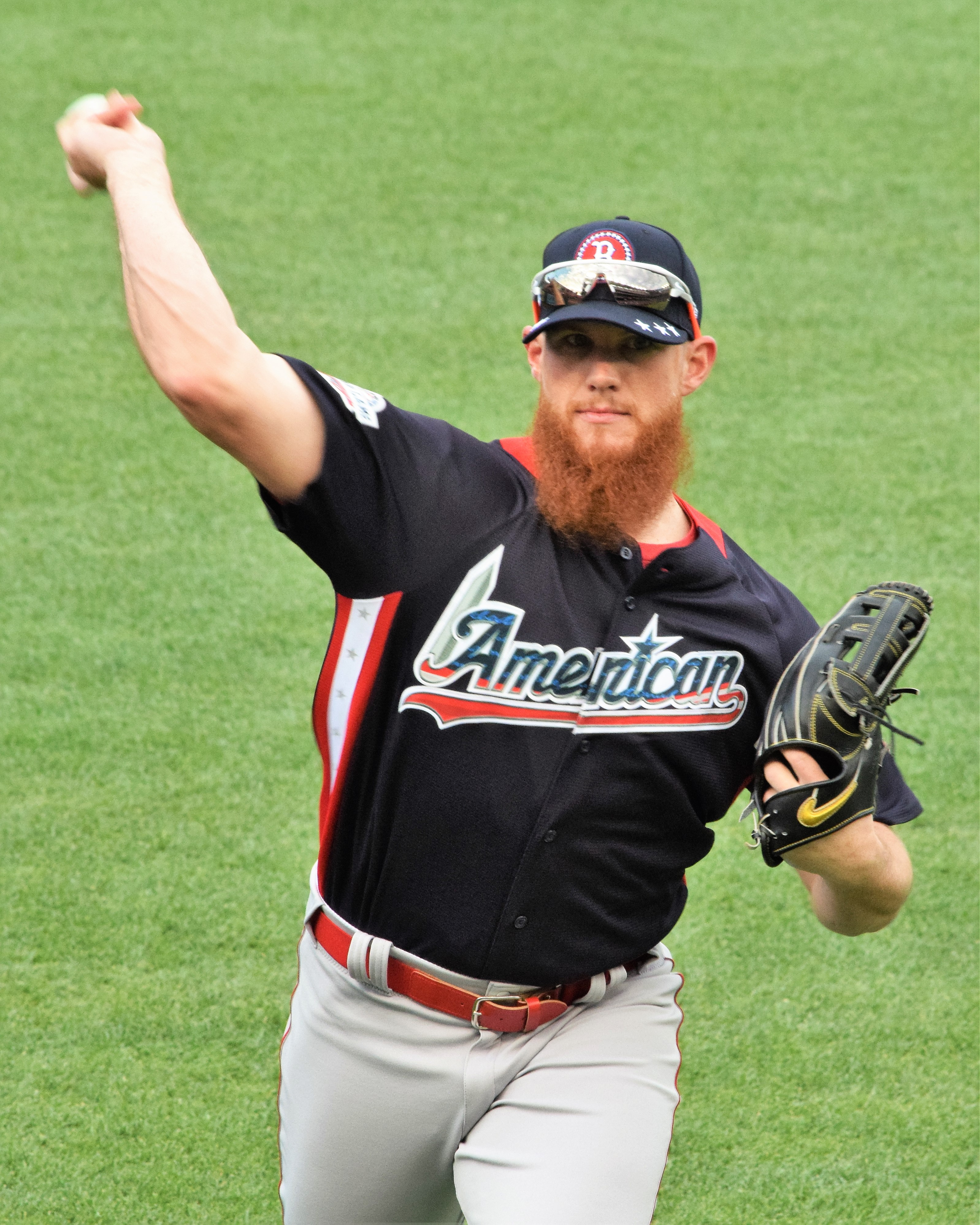
Kimbrel at the 2018 All-Star Game

On May 5, 2018, facing the Texas Rangers, Kimbrel recorded his 300th career save. He achieved this milestone in fewer games (494), fewer save opportunities (330), and at a younger age (29) than any other MLB pitcher. On July 8, Kimbrel recorded his 27th save of the season and was named to the All-Star Game. For the 2018 regular season, Kimbrel recorded 42 saves in 63 appearances, pitching to a 2.74 ERA with 96 strikeouts in 62 1/3 innings.

In the postseason, Kimbrel recorded six saves while allowing seven earned runs in 10 2/3 innings, as the Red Sox won the World Series over the Los Angeles Dodgers in five games. On November 12, Kimbrel declined Boston's one-year, $17.9 million qualifying offer, thus becoming a free agent.

Kimbrel did not sign with any teams during the off-season, remaining a free agent into the 2019 season.

=== Chicago Cubs (2019–2021) ===
On June 7, 2019, Kimbrel signed with the Chicago Cubs on a three-year, $43 million contract. On June 27, he was added to the Cubs' major league roster from the Triple-A Iowa Cubs and recorded his first save of the season, against Atlanta. On August 5, he was placed on IL for a knee inflammation. On August 18, 2019, he was reactivated from the IL to help the Cubs beleaguered bullpen. He finished the year 0–4 with 13 saves and a 6.53 ERA in 23 games.

In the pandemic-shortened 2020 season, Kimbrel went 0–1 with a 5.28 ERA and recorded 28 strikeouts and 12 walks in 15 1/3 innings.

On May 26, 2021, Kimbrel advanced to 11th on the all-time saves list after the Cubs beat the Pirates 4–1. On June 24, Kimbrel pitched a combined no-hitter against the Dodgers along with Zach Davies, Ryan Tepera, and Andrew Chafin.

=== Chicago White Sox (2021) ===
On July 30, 2021, the Cubs traded Kimbrel to the Chicago White Sox for Nick Madrigal and Codi Heuer. Out of the closer role, Kimbrel had a 5.09 ERA in 24 regular season games and a 9.00 ERA in three playoff games for the White Sox. On November 22, the White Sox exercised his $16 million option for the 2022 season.

=== Los Angeles Dodgers (2022) ===
On April 1, 2022, the White Sox traded Kimbrel to the Los Angeles Dodgers in exchange for A. J. Pollock. He pitched in 63 games for the Dodgers and finished with a 6–7 record, 3.75 ERA and 22 saves. However, by the end of the season he had been removed from the closer role. He did not pitch for the Dodgers in the playoffs.

=== Philadelphia Phillies (2023) ===
On January 4, 2023, Kimbrel signed a one-year, $10 million contract with the Philadelphia Phillies. He recorded his 400th career save on May 26, 2023, against Atlanta. In June, he pitched 13 innings in as many appearances, allowing only 1 run on 6 hits with 21 strikeouts and 5 saves, good for a 0.69 ERA, earning him NL Reliever of the Month honors.

In the NL Championship Series, Kimbrel was the losing pitcher in Games 3 and 4. In Game 3, he gave up a walk-off single to Ketel Marte in the bottom of the ninth inning. In Game 4, he blew a two-run lead in the 8th inning and gave up three runs, including a two-run home run to Alek Thomas. He became the first Phillies pitcher to lose back-to-back appearances in the playoffs since Mitch Williams in the 1993 World Series. Kimbrel became a free agent after the season.

=== Baltimore Orioles (2024) ===
On December 6, 2023, the Baltimore Orioles signed Kimbrel on a one-year, $13 million deal with a club option for the 2025 season. He made 57 appearances for Baltimore in 2024, compiling a 7–5 record and 5.33 ERA with 73 strikeouts and 23 saves. Kimbrel was designated for assignment on September 18, a day after he allowed six runs in the ninth inning against San Francisco. He was released by the Orioles on September 24.

=== Atlanta Braves (2025) ===
On March 19, 2025, Kimbrel signed a minor league contract to return to the Atlanta Braves organization. In 18 appearances split between the Double-A Columbus Clingstones and Triple-A Gwinnett Stripers, he had a 1–1 record and 2.00 ERA with 23 strikeouts and three saves over 18 innings pitched. On June 6, the Braves selected Kimbrel's contract, adding him to their active roster. He pitched the seventh inning of that night's game against San Francisco. The next day, Kimbrel was designated for assignment after making only 1 appearance for the Braves. He elected free agency on June 9.

=== Texas Rangers (2025) ===
On June 10, 2025, Kimbrel signed a minor league contract with the Texas Rangers. In 24 appearances for the Triple-A Round Rock Express, he tallied an 0–1 record and 3.86 ERA with 28 strikeouts and five saves over 21 innings of work. Kimbrel was released by the Rangers organization on August 21.

=== Houston Astros (2025) ===
On August 22, 2025, Kimbrel signed a major league contract with the Houston Astros. He appeared in 13 games with Astros, going 0–1 with a 2.45 ERA with 16 strikeouts over 11 innings of work. He did not record a save, as the Astros used Josh Hader and Bryan Abreu as closers in 2025.

=== New York Mets (2026) ===
On January 24, 2026, Kimbrel signed a minor league contract with the New York Mets. On March 22, the Mets announced that Kimbrel would not be on the Opening Day roster, and that he would be assigned to the Triple-A Syracuse Mets to begin the year. On April 11, New York selected Kimbrel's contract, adding him to their active roster. He made 14 appearances for the Mets, struggling to an 0–2 record and 6.00 ERA with 15 strikeouts over 15 innings of work. On May 22, Kimbrel was designated for assignment following the promotion of Jonah Tong. He elected free agency after clearing waivers on May 25.

=== Tampa Bay Rays (2026) ===
On May 26, 2026, Kimbrel signed a major league contract with the Tampa Bay Rays. Kimbrel was placed on the 15-day injured list on May 31 with wrist soreness. Kimbrel returned to the active roster on June 13. In 18 appearances for Tampa Bay, he recorded a 3.06 ERA with 16 strikeouts across 17 2/3 innings pitched. Kimbrel was designated for assignment by the Rays on August 2. He elected free agency after clearing waivers on August 6.

=== Kansas City Royals (2026–present) ===
On August 10, 2026, Kimbrel signed a major league contract with the Kansas City Royals.

== International career ==
Kimbrel was named the closer for Team USA in the 2013 World Baseball Classic. Despite not surrendering a lead-off double all year with the Braves in 2012, Kimbrel gave one up to Nelson Cruz of the Dominican Republic in their second round matchup. Kimbrel gave up two runs in the game and was the losing pitcher in Team USA's 3–1 loss to the eventual champions.

== Pitching style ==
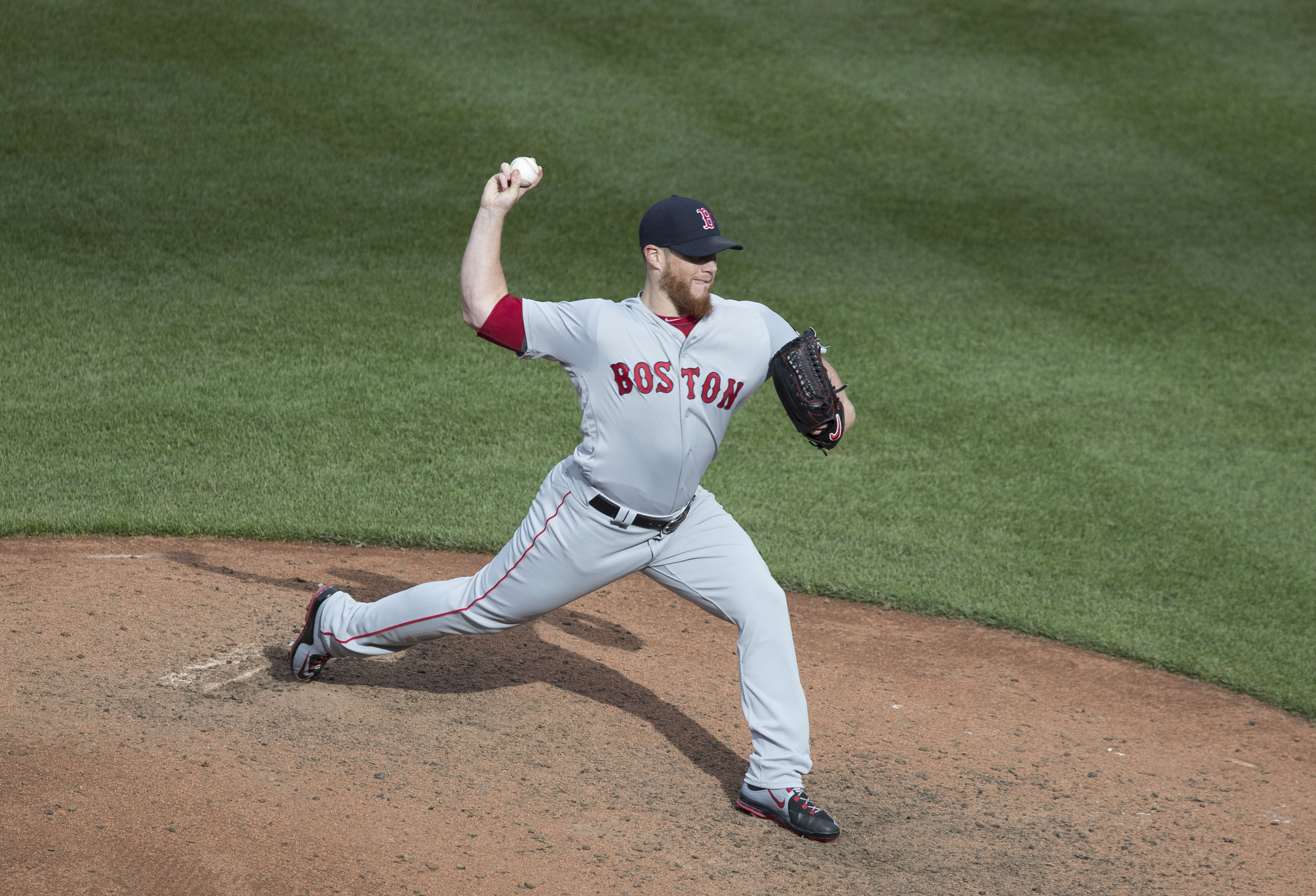
Kimbrel pitching for the Red Sox in 2017

Kimbrel uses a combination of a four-seam fastball and a power curveball to get outs. At his prime, his fastball averaged 97–98 miles per hour (156–158 km/h), occasionally topping out at 101 miles per hour (163 km/h). His curve, thrown with a "spike" grip, ranged in the mid-to-upper 80s. The whiff rate of his four-seamer is 33%, and the curve is at 52%. This combination contributes to a career strikeouts per nine innings rate of 14.0 (as of 13 April 2026). He is also tied for third among all pitchers from 2002 to 2012 in the highest percentage of pitches that resulted in swinging strikes. In years following, Kimbrel would add a mid-80s sweeper as a third pitch to his arsenal, as well as a rarely used changeup.

Kimbrel's four-seam fastball was the 12th-fastest among major league relievers in the 2011 season. In addition, he threw the hardest curveball, averaging 87 miles per hour (140 km/h). His fastball had the fifth-highest whiff rate among relief pitchers (32%), and he also had the highest whiff rate of any reliever's curveball, at better than 55%. His pre-pitch stance has also been widely noted and has been dubbed "Kimbreling" or "Spider Arms".

== Personal life ==
Kimbrel has two brothers. His brother Matt played baseball in the Braves minor league system for three seasons. Matt Kimbrel died in a motorcycle crash in Huntsville, Alabama on September 19, 2026.

Kimbrel married his wife, a former Wallace State cheerleader, in 2012. They have two children. Their oldest daughter was born November 3, 2017, with heart defects and has undergone two surgeries.

Kimbrel is a born-again Christian.

== See also ==
- List of Atlanta Braves award winners and league leaders
- List of Boston Red Sox award winners
- List of Chicago Cubs no-hitters
- List of Major League Baseball career games finished leaders
- List of Major League Baseball single-inning strikeout leaders
- List of Major League Baseball career saves leaders

== Notes ==
Awards and achievements
Preceded by Corey Kluber	No-hit game June 24, 2021 (with Davies, Tepera & Chafin)	Succeeded by Tyler Gilbert
