= Major League Baseball Delivery Man of the Month Award =

Monthly award in Major League Baseball

Delivery Man of the Month Award
- Awarded for: Best relief pitcher in MLB
- Sponsored by: DHL (2005–2010)
- Country: United States, Canada
- Presented by: Major League Baseball

History
- First award: 2005
- Final award: 2013
- Most wins: Trevor Hoffman (4)

Major League Baseball (MLB) honored its best relief pitchers with a Delivery Man of the Month Award for one pitcher during each month of the regular season from 2005 through 2013. The awards were initially part of a sponsorship agreement between MLB and package delivery company DHL Express; DHL's sponsorship ran from 2005 to 2010. There was also a Delivery Man of the Year Award; all of the Delivery Man awards were discontinued after 2013. A new Reliever of the Month Award was first awarded in 2017.

== Winners ==
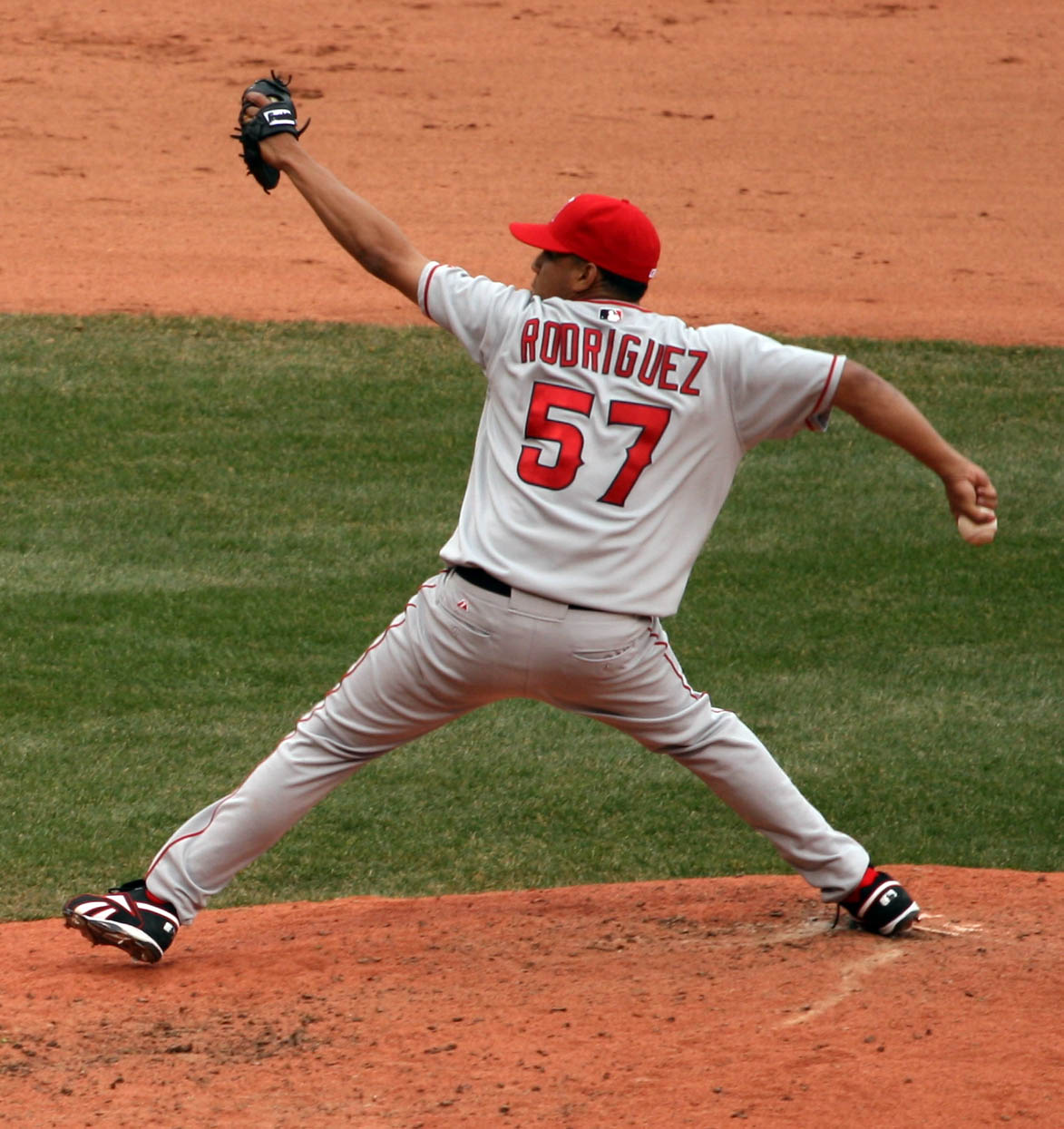
Francisco Rodríguez won the Delivery Man of the Month Award in August 2006 and June 2008.

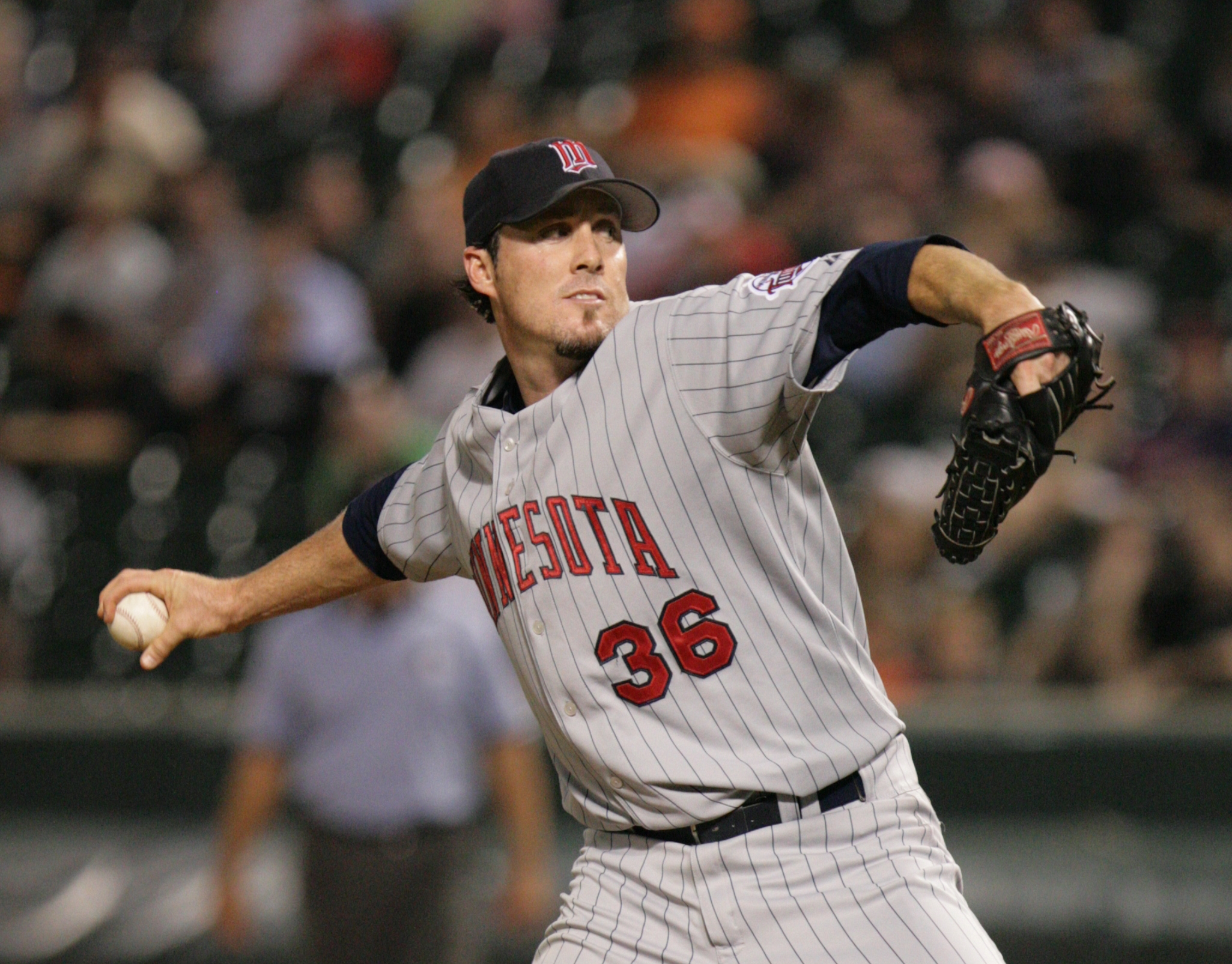
Joe Nathan won the Delivery Man of the Month Award three times.

Winners of the monthly award were decided by a four-man panel, which originally consisted of Dennis Eckersley, Jerome Holtzman, Rick Sutcliffe and Bob Watson. The panel later included Darryl Hamilton and Mike Bauman, a national columnist for MLB.com.

Trevor Hoffman received the award more than any other pitcher, with four wins between May 2005 and May 2009. Four other pitchers received the award three times: Craig Kimbrel, Joe Nathan, J. J. Putz, and Rafael Soriano. The most wins by a team was four, accomplished by the Kansas City Royals via Joakim Soria (2) and Greg Holland (2); the Pittsburgh Pirates via José Mesa, Joel Hanrahan, and Jason Grilli (2); and the San Diego Padres via Hoffman (3) and Heath Bell.

Month	Year	Player	Team	SV	ERA	H	BB	K	IP	Ref
April	2005	José Mesa	Pittsburgh Pirates	8	1.12	7	2	10	8	
May	2005	Trevor Hoffman (1)	San Diego Padres	12	0.82	6	1	13	11	
June	2005	Chad Cordero	Washington Nationals	15	0.00	11	2	14	16 1/3	
July	2005	Brad Lidge	Houston Astros	8	1.64	4	1	15	11	
August	2005	Todd Jones	Florida Marlins	12	0.66	10	0	13	13 2/3	
September	2005	Ryan Dempster	Chicago Cubs	13	0.00	10	5	19	15 2/3	
April	2006	Jonathan Papelbon (1)	Boston Red Sox	10	0.00	7	2	14	14 1/3	
May	2006	Jason Isringhausen	St. Louis Cardinals	10	0.77	7	8	14	11 2/3	
June	2006	Bobby Jenks (1)	Chicago White Sox	10	0.60	9	5	16	15	
July	2006	Joe Nathan (1)	Minnesota Twins	9	0.75	9	4	19	12	
August	2006	Francisco Rodríguez (1)	Los Angeles Angels of Anaheim	12	0.00	7	6	17	13 1/3	
September	2006	Trevor Hoffman (2)	San Diego Padres	10	1.50	7	4	13	12	
April	2007	Francisco Cordero	Milwaukee Brewers	10	0.00	2	7	19	11 1/3	
May	2007	Trevor Hoffman (3)	San Diego Padres	11	0.00	6	1	10	12 1/3	
June	2007	J. J. Putz (1)	Seattle Mariners	11	0.59	6	3	19	15 1/3	
July	2007	Billy Wagner	New York Mets	8	0.00	2	4	7	9	
August	2007	Takashi Saito	Los Angeles Dodgers	10	0.68	7	2	21	13 1/3	
September	2007	Manny Corpas	Colorado Rockies	8	2.30	13	2	5	15 2/3	
April	2008	Mariano Rivera (1)	New York Yankees	8	0.00	4	0	12	13	
May	2008	B. J. Ryan	Toronto Blue Jays	10	0.75	7	6	14	12	
June	2008	Francisco Rodríguez (2)	Los Angeles Angels of Anaheim	11	1.59	5	5	12	11 1/3	
July	2008	Joe Nathan (2)	Minnesota Twins	7	0.82	3	5	12	11	
August	2008	José Valverde	Houston Astros	11	0.64	5	3	17	14	
September	2008	Joakim Soria (1)	Kansas City Royals	9	0.00	3	4	8	10 1/3	
April	2009	Heath Bell	San Diego Padres	8	0.00	4	2	9	8 2/3	
May	2009	Trevor Hoffman (4)	Milwaukee Brewers	11	0.00	4	1	11	12	
June	2009	Joe Nathan (3)	Minnesota Twins	11	0.00	4	1	18	11 2/3	
July	2009	Mariano Rivera (2)	New York Yankees	10	0.00	3	2	9	11 2/3	
August	2009	Ryan Franklin	St. Louis Cardinals	11	0.00	6	6	4	11	
September	2009	Joakim Soria (2)	Kansas City Royals	10	0.00	12	5	21	13 2/3	
April	2010	Matt Capps	Washington Nationals	10	0.68	12	6	15	13 1/3	
May	2010	Rafael Soriano (1)	Tampa Bay Rays	9	0.00	3	3	9	11 1/3	
June	2010	Bobby Jenks (2)	Chicago White Sox	10	0.75	7	1	14	12	
July	2010	Rafael Soriano (2)	Tampa Bay Rays	11	2.57	4	4	9	14	
August	2010	Rafael Soriano (3)	Tampa Bay Rays	10	0.82	4	2	10	10 2/3	
September	2010	Carlos Mármol	Chicago Cubs	13	0.00	2	10	25	14 2/3	
April	2011	Huston Street	Colorado Rockies	10	2.20	13	4	17	16 1/3	
May	2011	J. J. Putz (2)	Arizona Diamondbacks	11	0.00	5	4	10	13	
June	2011	Joel Hanrahan	Pittsburgh Pirates	9	0.71	5	3	11	12 2/3	
July	2011	John Axford	Milwaukee Brewers	11	2.57	13	3	16	14	
August	2011	Craig Kimbrel (1)	Atlanta Braves	10	0.00	6	4	23	12 2/3	
September	2011	J. J. Putz (3)	Arizona Diamondbacks	10	0.00	6	1	15	9 2/3	
April	2012	Jonathan Papelbon (2)	Philadelphia Phillies	8	0.90	6	3	10	10	
May	2012	Jim Johnson	Baltimore Orioles	9	1.42	7	0	8	12 2/3	
June	2012	Tyler Clippard	Washington Nationals	10	0.00	2	6	12	11 2/3	
July	2012	Aroldis Chapman (1)	Cincinnati Reds	13	0.00	6	2	31	14 1/3	
August	2012	Aroldis Chapman (2)	Cincinnati Reds	11	0.68	8	2	18	13 1/3	
September	2012	Craig Kimbrel (2)	Atlanta Braves	10	0.00	6	2	25	12 2/3	
April	2013	Jason Grilli (1)	Pittsburgh Pirates	10	0.82	5	4	17	11	
May	2013	Jason Grilli (2)	Pittsburgh Pirates	12	1.32	7	1	21	13 2/3	
June	2013	Joe Nathan (4)	Texas Rangers	11	0.63	6	3	15	14 1/3	
July	2013	Greg Holland (1)	Kansas City Royals	11	0.82	9	1	15	11	
August	2013	Craig Kimbrel (3)	Atlanta Braves	12	0.00	8	2	19	16 1/3	
September	2013	Greg Holland (2)	Kansas City Royals	11	0.60	7	4	20	15	

== See also ==
- Baseball awards
- List of MLB awards
