= Major League Baseball Delivery Man of the Year Award =

Delivery Man of the Year Award
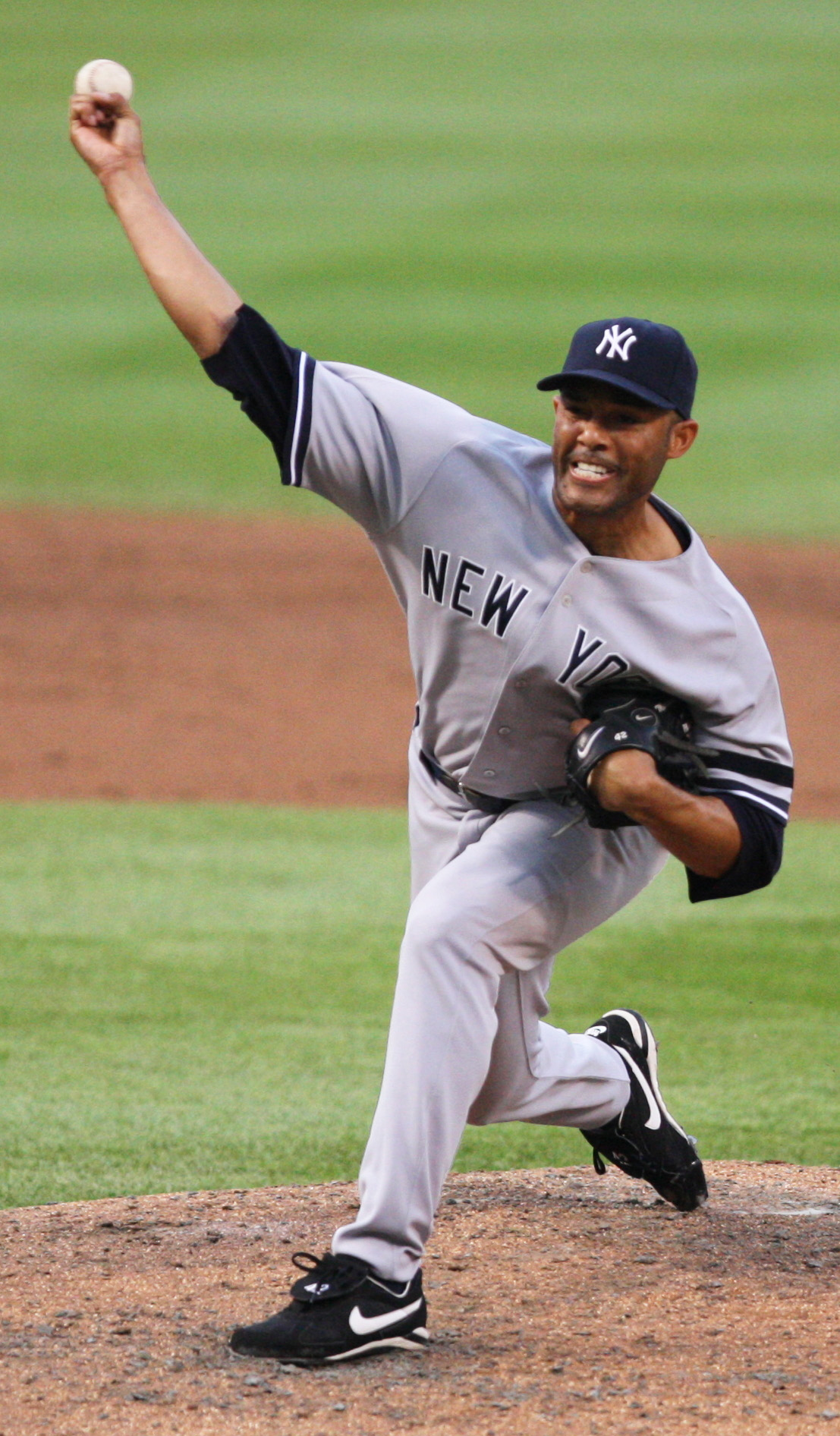
- Mariano Rivera, winner of the Delivery Man of the Year Award in 2005, 2006, and 2009
- Awarded for: Best relief pitcher in MLB
- Sponsored by: DHL (2005–2010)
- Presented by: Major League Baseball

History
- First award: 2005
- Final award: 2013
- Most wins: Mariano Rivera (3)

Major League Baseball (MLB) annually honored its best relief pitcher with the Major League Baseball Delivery Man of the Year Award from 2005 through 2013. It was initially part of a sponsorship agreement between MLB and package delivery company DHL Express; DHL's sponsorship ran from 2005 to 2010. There was also a Delivery Man of the Month Award. From its inception in 2005 through 2008, the award was given to a single reliever who was selected online by fans from a group of 10 finalists chosen by an MLB panel. The panel took sole responsibility to select the annual winner starting in 2009.

Mariano Rivera was the only pitcher to win the annual award more than once, receiving it in 2005, 2006, and 2009. The award was discontinued after 2013, replaced by the Reliever of the Year Awards.

== List of annual winners ==
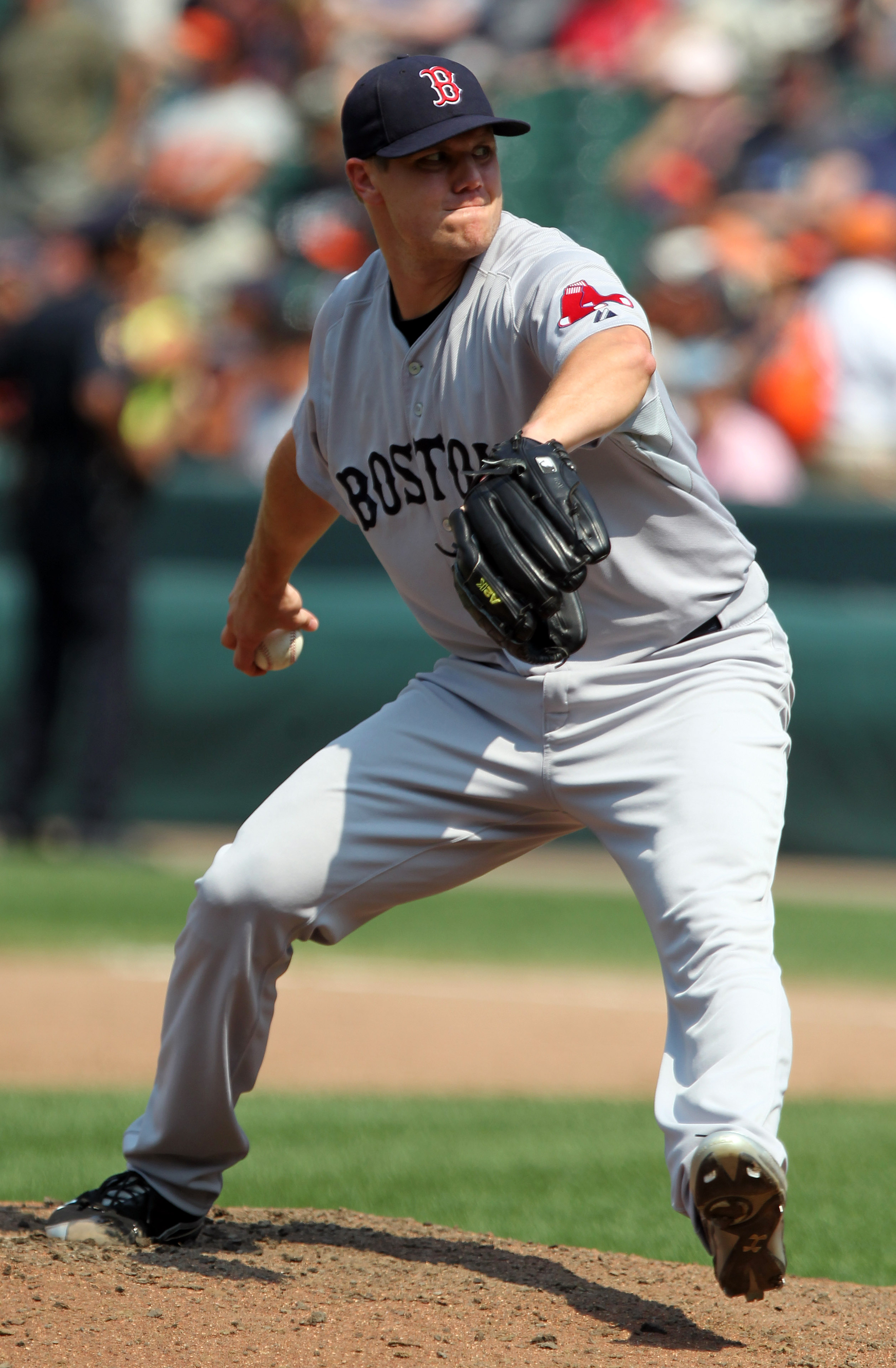
Jonathan Papelbon won the Delivery Man of the Year Award in 2007.

Year	Player	Team	SV	ERA	WHIP	K	IP	Ref
2005	Mariano Rivera (1)	New York Yankees	43	1.38	0.87	80	78 1/3	
2006	Mariano Rivera (2)	New York Yankees	34	1.80	0.96	55	75	
2007	Jonathan Papelbon	Boston Red Sox	37	1.85	0.77	84	58 1/3	
2008	Brad Lidge	Philadelphia Phillies	41	1.95	1.23	92	69 1/3	
2009	Mariano Rivera (3)	New York Yankees	44	1.76	0.90	72	66 1/3	
2010	Heath Bell	San Diego Padres	47	1.93	1.20	86	70	
2011	José Valverde	Detroit Tigers	49	2.24	1.19	69	72 1/3	
2012	Fernando Rodney	Tampa Bay Rays	48	0.60	0.78	76	74 2/3	
2013	Craig Kimbrel	Atlanta Braves	50	1.21	0.88	98	67	

== See also ==
- Sporting News Relief Pitcher of the Year Award (2013–present)
- Sporting News Reliever of the Year Award (1960–2010)
- Rolaids Relief Man Award (1976–2012)
- Baseball awards
- List of MLB awards
