= 2025 Baseball Hall of Fame balloting =

Elections to the Baseball Hall of Fame

National Baseball

Hall of Fame and Museum
- New inductees: 5
- via BBWAA: 3
- via Classic Baseball Era Committee: 2
- Total inductees: 351
- Induction date: July 27, 2025

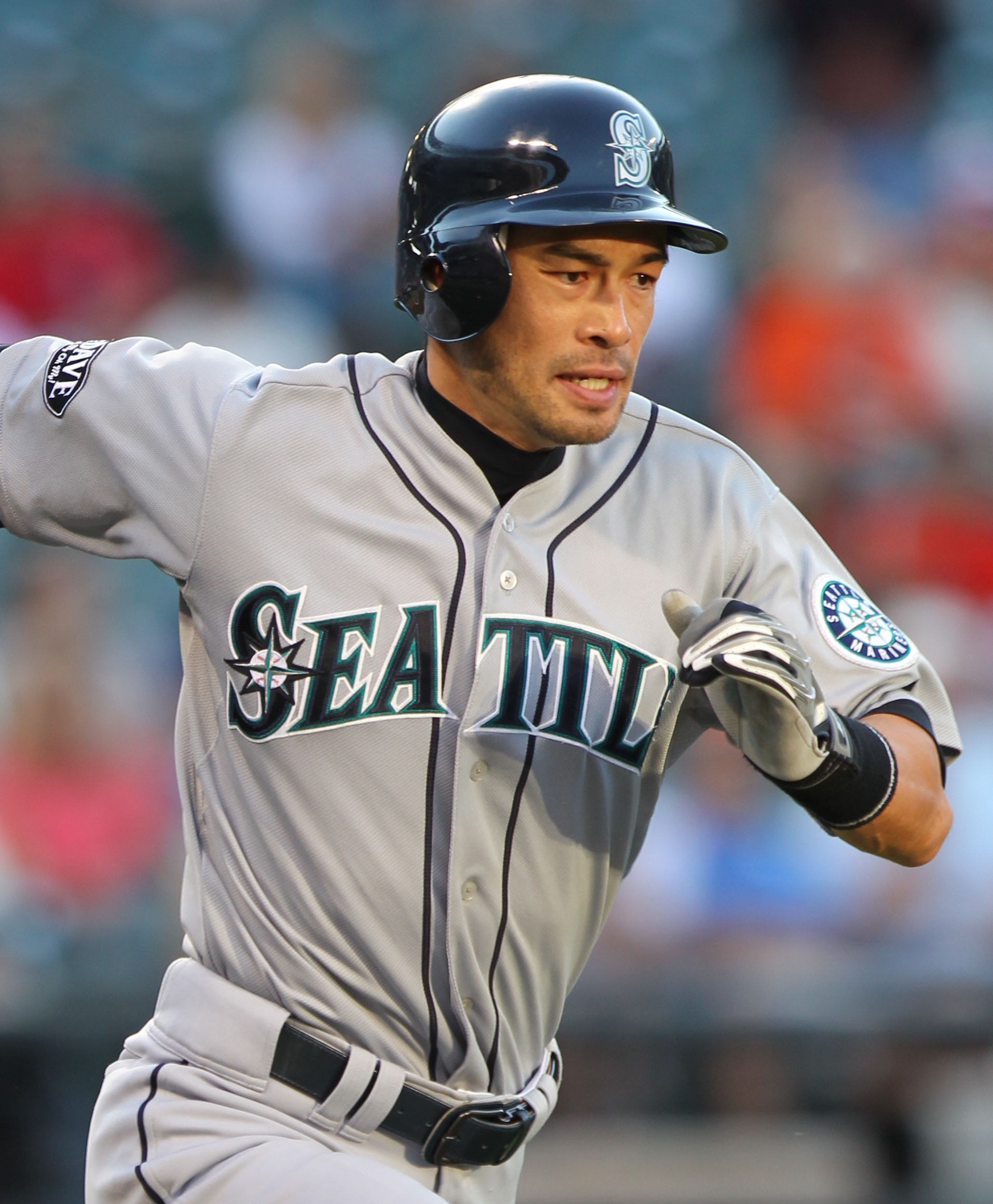
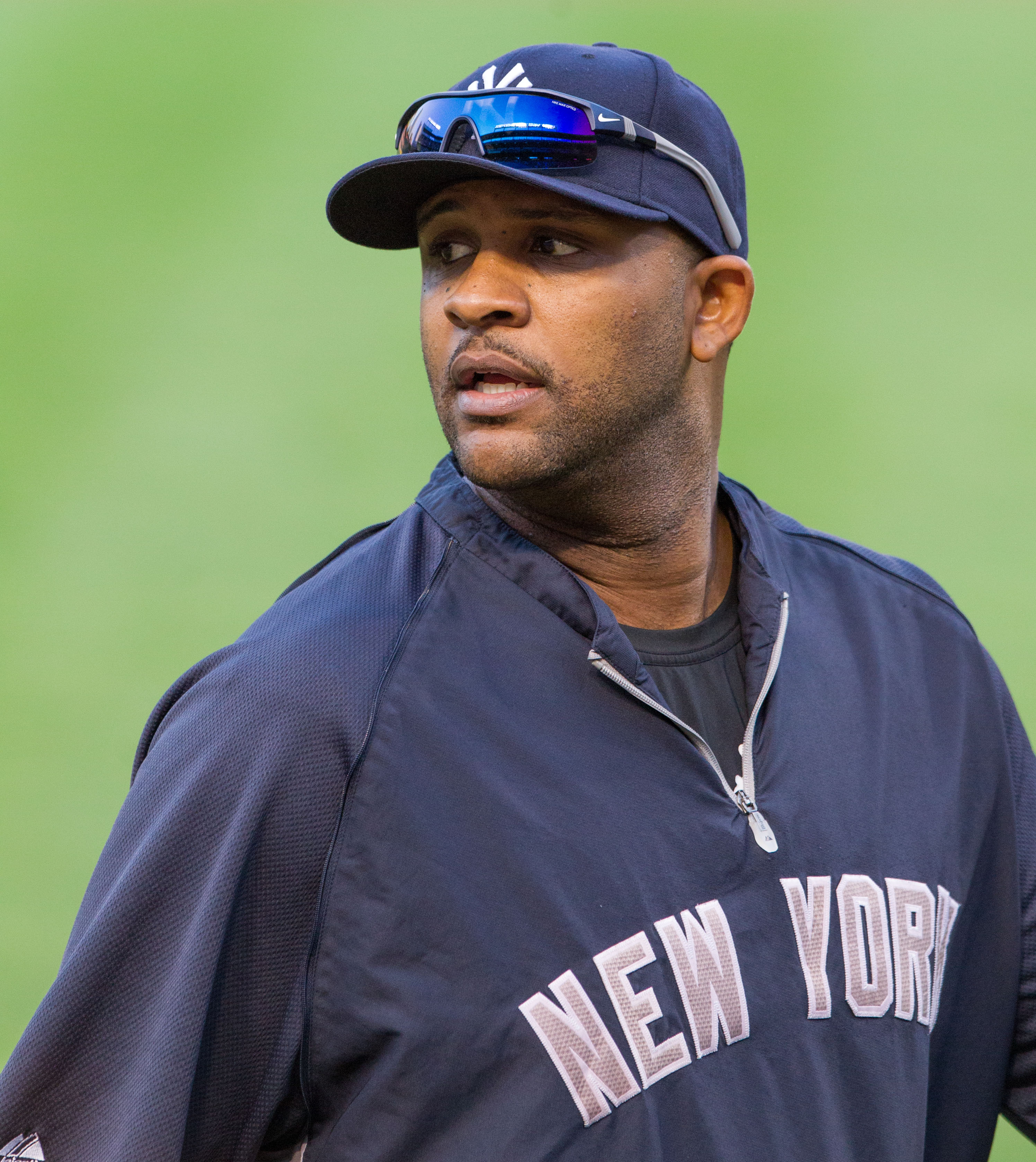
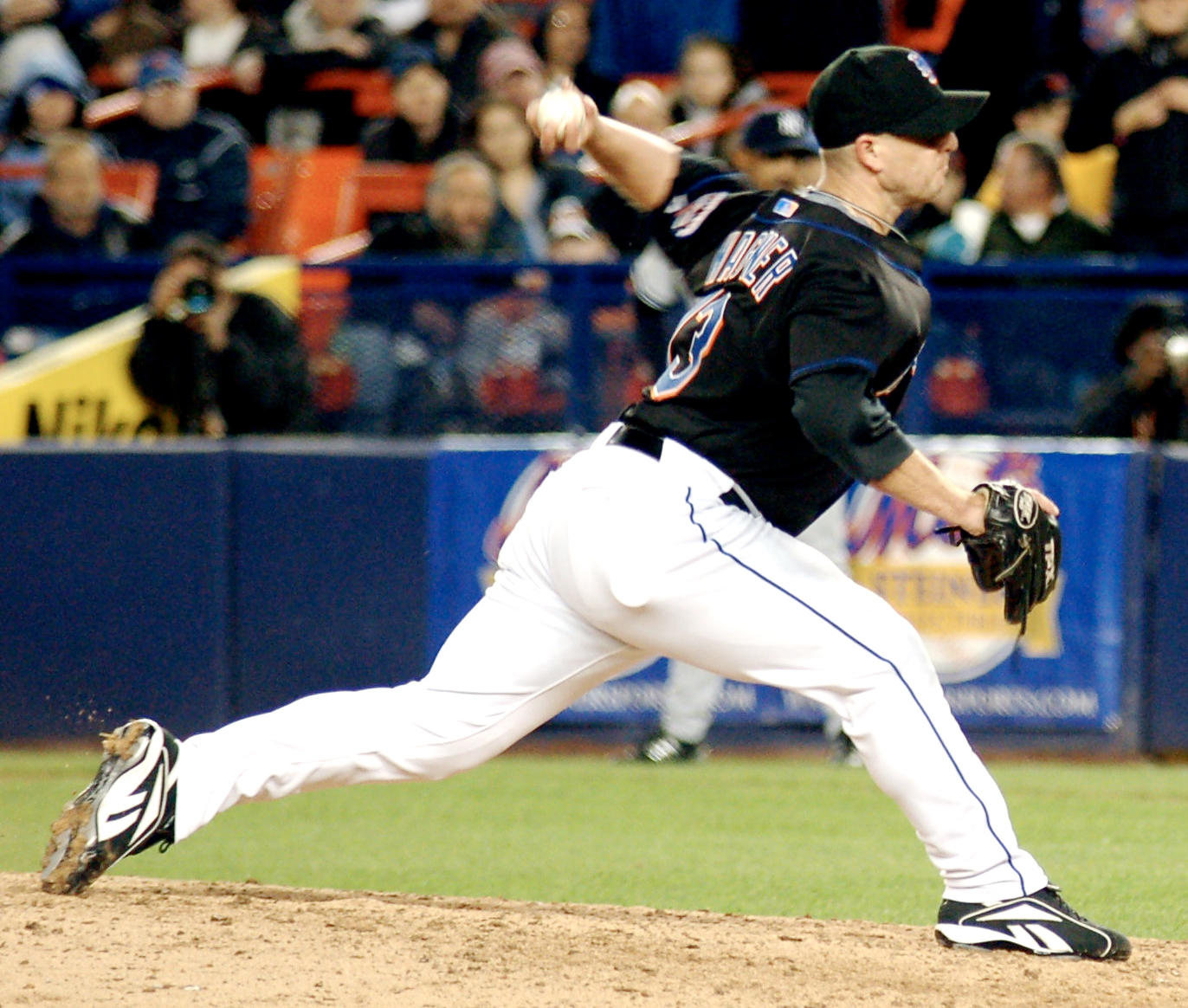
2025 BBWAA inductees (L-R): Ichiro Suzuki, CC Sabathia, and Billy Wagner

Elections to the Baseball Hall of Fame for 2025 were conducted according to the rules most recently amended in 2022. As in the past, the Baseball Writers' Association of America (BBWAA) voted by mail to select from a ballot of recently retired players, and the results were announced on January 21.

Three candidates were inducted by the BBWAA: Ichiro Suzuki, CC Sabathia, and Billy Wagner. Suzuki and Sabathia were inducted in their first year of eligibility; Wagner was in his tenth and final year of eligibility.

A meeting of the Classic Baseball Era committee—one of a group of three rotating bodies generally referred to as the Veterans Committee and whose structure was amended in April 2022—was held in December 2024 to consider players from the era before 1980 who no longer appear on the BBWAA ballot. Dave Parker and Dick Allen were elected from the Veterans Committee ballot.

The inductees were honored in a ceremony in Cooperstown, New York on Sunday, July 27, 2025.

== BBWAA election ==
The list of players appearing on the BBWAA ballot was released on November 18, 2024. There were 14 players carried over from the 2024 ballot, who garnered at least 5% of the vote and were still eligible for election, as well as 14 players whose last major league appearance was in 2019, played at least 10 seasons of Major League Baseball, and were chosen by a screening committee. This was the final ballot for Billy Wagner. A total of 394 ballots were cast, with 296 votes needed to reach the 75% threshold for election. A total of 2,667 votes were cast for individual players, an average of 6.77 votes per ballot.

Hall of Fame voting results for class of 2025
Player	Votes	Percent	Change	Year
**Ichiro Suzuki**†	393	99.7%	–	1st
**CC Sabathia**†	342	86.8%	–	1st
**Billy Wagner**	325	82.5%	▲8.7%	10th
Carlos Beltrán	277	70.3%	▲13.2%	3rd
Andruw Jones	261	66.2%	▲4.6%	8th
Chase Utley	157	39.8%	▲11.0%	2nd
Alex Rodriguez	146	37.1%	▲2.3%	4th
Manny Ramirez	135	34.3%	▲1.8%	9th
Andy Pettitte	110	27.9%	▲14.4%	7th
Félix Hernández†	81	20.6%	–	1st
Bobby Abreu	77	19.5%	▲4.7%	6th
Jimmy Rollins	71	18.0%	▲3.2%	4th
Omar Vizquel	70	17.8%	▲0.1%	8th
Dustin Pedroia†	47	11.9%	–	1st
Mark Buehrle	45	11.4%	▲3.1%	5th
Francisco Rodríguez	40	10.2%	▲2.4%	3rd
David Wright	32	8.1%	▲1.9%	2nd
Torii Hunter	20	5.1%	▼2.2%	5th
Ian Kinsler†*	10	2.5%	–	1st
Russell Martin†*	9	2.3%	–	1st
Brian McCann†*	7	1.8%	–	1st
Troy Tulowitzki†*	4	1.0%	–	1st
Curtis Granderson†*	3	0.8%	–	1st
Adam Jones†*	3	0.8%	–	1st
Carlos González†*	2	0.5%	–	1st
Hanley Ramírez†*	0	0.0%	–	1st
Fernando Rodney†*	0	0.0%	–	1st
Ben Zobrist†*	0	0.0%	–	1st

Key
	Elected to the Hall of Fame on this ballot (named in **bold italics**).
	Elected subsequently, as of 2026 (named in plain italics).
	Renominated for the 2026 BBWAA election by adequate performance on this ballot and has not subsequently been eliminated.
	Eliminated from annual BBWAA consideration by poor performance or expiration on subsequent ballots.
	Eliminated from annual BBWAA consideration by poor performance or expiration on this ballot.
†	First time on the BBWAA ballot.
*	Eliminated from annual BBWAA consideration by poor performance on this ballot (not expiration).

Players who met first-year eligibility requirements but were not selected by the screening committee for inclusion on the ballot were: Matt Albers, Yonder Alonso, Gordon Beckham, Jerry Blevins, Peter Bourjos, Clay Buchholz, Melky Cabrera, Andrew Cashner, Welington Castillo, Rajai Davis, Daniel Descalso, Ian Desmond, Lucas Duda, Zach Duke, Mike Dunn, Marco Estrada, David Freese, Luke Gregerson, Carlos Gómez, Jeanmar Gómez, Jeremy Hellickson, David Hernandez, Nick Hundley, Chris Iannetta, Edwin Jackson, Shawn Kelley, Mike Leake, Francisco Liriano, Kendrys Morales, Pat Neshek, Steve Pearce, Martín Prado, Mark Reynolds, Clayton Richard, Tyson Ross, Fernando Salas, Tony Sipp, Carlos Torres, Mark Trumbo, Jason Vargas, and Bobby Wilson.

== Classic Baseball Era Committee ==
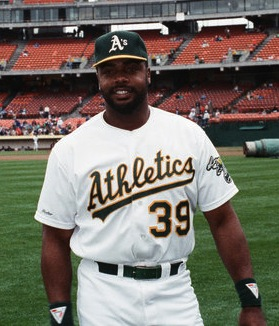
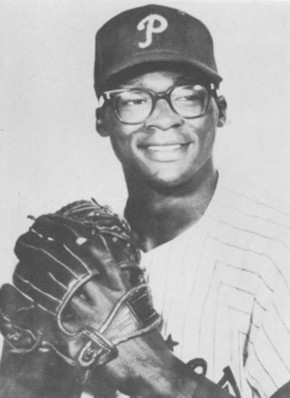
2025 Era Committee inductees Dave Parker (left) and Dick Allen

The Classic Baseball Era Committee met at the Winter Meetings in December 2024 to consider the election of eight players who made their greatest impact on the game through 1979. The full ballot was announced on November 4, 2024, and the voting was held on December 8. Of the eight candidates, only Steve Garvey, Tommy John, and Dave Parker were still alive at the time of voting. Parker died on June 28, 2025, 29 days before the scheduled induction ceremony.

Candidate	Category	Votes	Percent
**Dave Parker**	Player	14	87.5%
**Dick Allen**	Player	13	81.25%
Tommy John	Player	7	43.75%
Ken Boyer	Player	<5	
John Donaldson	Player	<5	
Steve Garvey	Player	<5	
Vic Harris	Manager	<5	
Luis Tiant	Player	<5	

Key
Elected to the Hall of Fame on this ballot (named in **bold italics**).
Elected subsequently, as of 2026 (named in plain italics).
Ineligible for the 2028 Veterans Committee election by poor performance on this ballot and has not subsequently been eliminated.
Eliminated from triennial Veterans Committee consideration by poor performance on subsequent ballots.
Eliminated from triennial Veterans Committee consideration by poor performance on this ballot.

The 16-member committee (of which, 75% or 12 votes were required for election) consisted of the following individuals:

- Hall of Famers: Paul Molitor, Eddie Murray, Tony Pérez, Lee Smith, Ozzie Smith, Joe Torre
- Executives: Sandy Alderson, Terry McGuirk, Dayton Moore, Arte Moreno, Brian Sabean
- Media and historians: Bob Elliott, Leslie Heaphy, Steve Hirdt, Dick Kaegel, Larry Lester

Each member of the committee could vote for a maximum of three players.

== Ford C. Frick Award ==
The Ford C. Frick Award is presented annually to a broadcaster for "major contributions to baseball" and has been presented annually since 1978. The 2025 award will be a composite ballot of local and national voices, as per the rules most recently amended in 2023. The 2025 finalists, and the teams they are best known as broadcasters for, are:

- Skip Caray (1939–2008), Atlanta Braves
- René Cárdenas (born 1930), Spanish-language announcer for the Los Angeles Dodgers, Houston Colt .45s / Astros, and Texas Rangers
- Gary Cohen (born 1958), New York Mets
- Jacques Doucet (born 1940), French-language announcer for the Montreal Expos and Toronto Blue Jays
- Tom Hamilton (born 1954), Cleveland Indians / Guardians
- Ernie Johnson Sr. (1924–2011), Milwaukee / Atlanta Braves
- Mike Krukow (born 1952), San Francisco Giants
- Duane Kuiper (born 1950), San Francisco Giants
- Dave Sims (born 1953), Seattle Mariners
- John Sterling (born 1938), New York Yankees

On December 11, 2024, the Hall of Fame declared Tom Hamilton as the recipient of the Ford C. Frick Award.

== BBWAA Career Excellence Award ==
The BBWAA Career Excellence Award honors a baseball writer (or writers) "for meritorious contributions to baseball writing" and is presented during Hall of Fame Weekend by that year's President of the Baseball Writers' Association of America (BBWAA). The award is voted upon annually by the BBWAA.

On December 10, 2024, the Hall of Fame announced Thomas Boswell as the recipient of the 2025 BBWAA Career Excellence Award.
