= List of Major League Baseball career games played as a pitcher leaders =

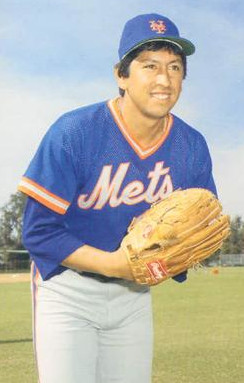
Jesse Orosco, the all-time leader in games played as a pitcher.

Games played (most often abbreviated as G or GP) is a statistic used in team sports to indicate the total number of games in which a player has participated (in any capacity); the statistic is generally applied irrespective of whatever portion of the game is contested. In baseball, the statistic applies also to players who, prior to a game, are included on a starting lineup card or are announced as ex ante substitutes, whether or not they play; however, in Major League Baseball, the application of this statistic does not extend to consecutive games played streaks. A starting pitcher, then, may be credited with a game played even if he is not credited with a game started or an inning pitched. The pitcher is the player who pitches the baseball from the pitcher's mound toward the catcher to begin each play, with the goal of retiring a batter, who attempts to either make contact with the pitched ball or draw a walk. The pitcher is often considered the most important player on the defensive side of the game, playing the most difficult and specialized position, and as such is regarded as being at the right end of the defensive spectrum. Pitchers play far less than players at other positions, generally appearing in only two or three games per week; only one pitcher in major league history has appeared in 100 games in a single season. There are many different types of pitchers, generally divided between starting pitchers and relief pitchers, which include the middle reliever, lefty specialist, setup man, and closer. In the scoring system used to record defensive plays, the pitcher is assigned the number 1.

The sharp rise in the importance of relief pitching after 1950, and increased specialization in later decades, has led to a great increase in the number of players with high totals in games as a pitcher. Through the 2024 season, the top 24 players in career games pitched were all relief pitchers whose careers began after 1950, only two of whom were active before 1968; the top three pitchers are all left-handed. Jesse Orosco is the all-time leader in career games played as a pitcher with 1,252. Only sixteen different players have pitched in over 1,000 games during their careers.

== Key ==
**Rank**	Rank amongst leaders in career games played. A blank field indicates a tie.
**Player (2027 Gs)**	Number of games played during the 2027 Major League Baseball season
**Throws**	Denotes right-handed (R) or left-handed (L) pitcher
**MLB**	Total career games played as a pitcher in Major League Baseball
*	Denotes elected to National Baseball Hall of Fame
**Bold**	Denotes active player (Note: A player is considered inactive if he has announced his retirement or has not played for a full season.)

== List ==
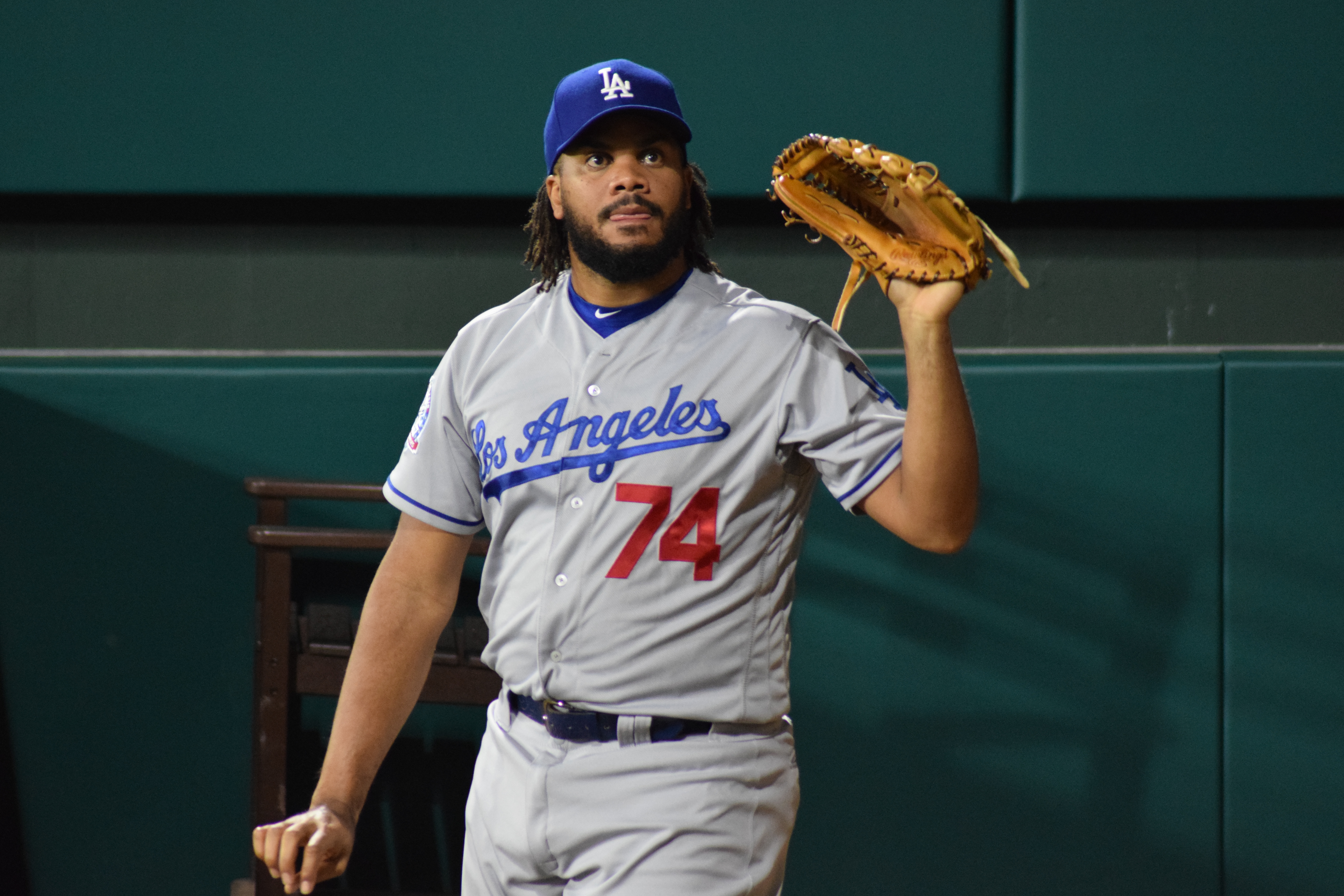
Kenley Jansen, the active leader and 18th all-time in games played as a pitcher.

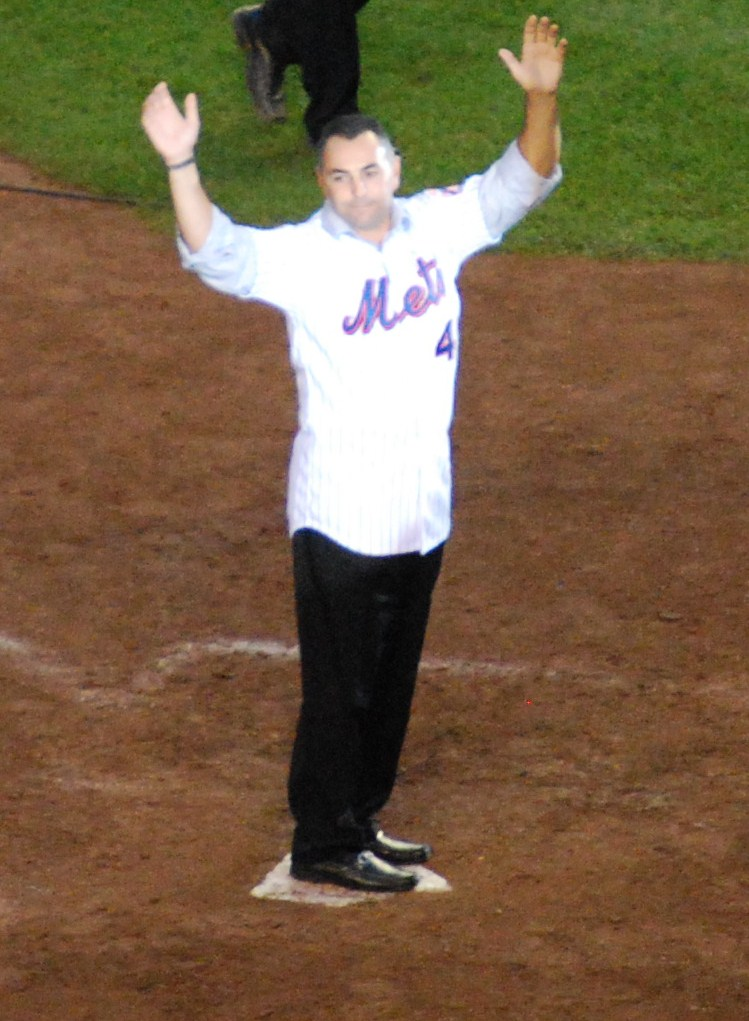
John Franco holds the National League record.

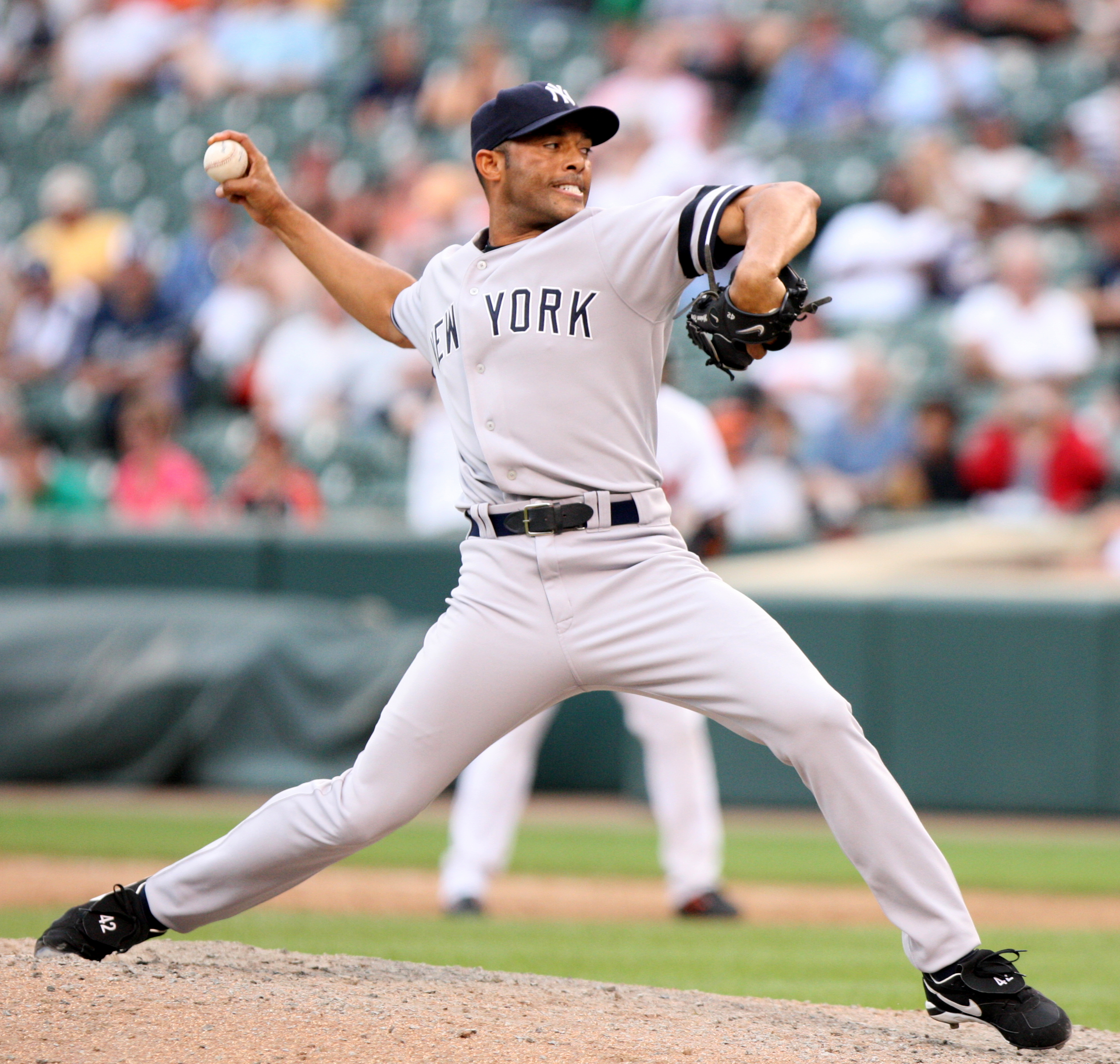
Mariano Rivera holds the American League record, as well as the record for right-handed pitchers.

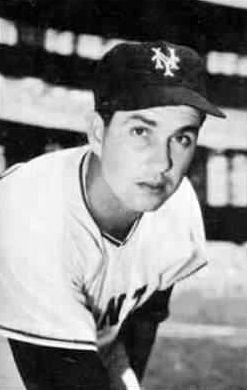
Hoyt Wilhelm held the major league record for 30 years.

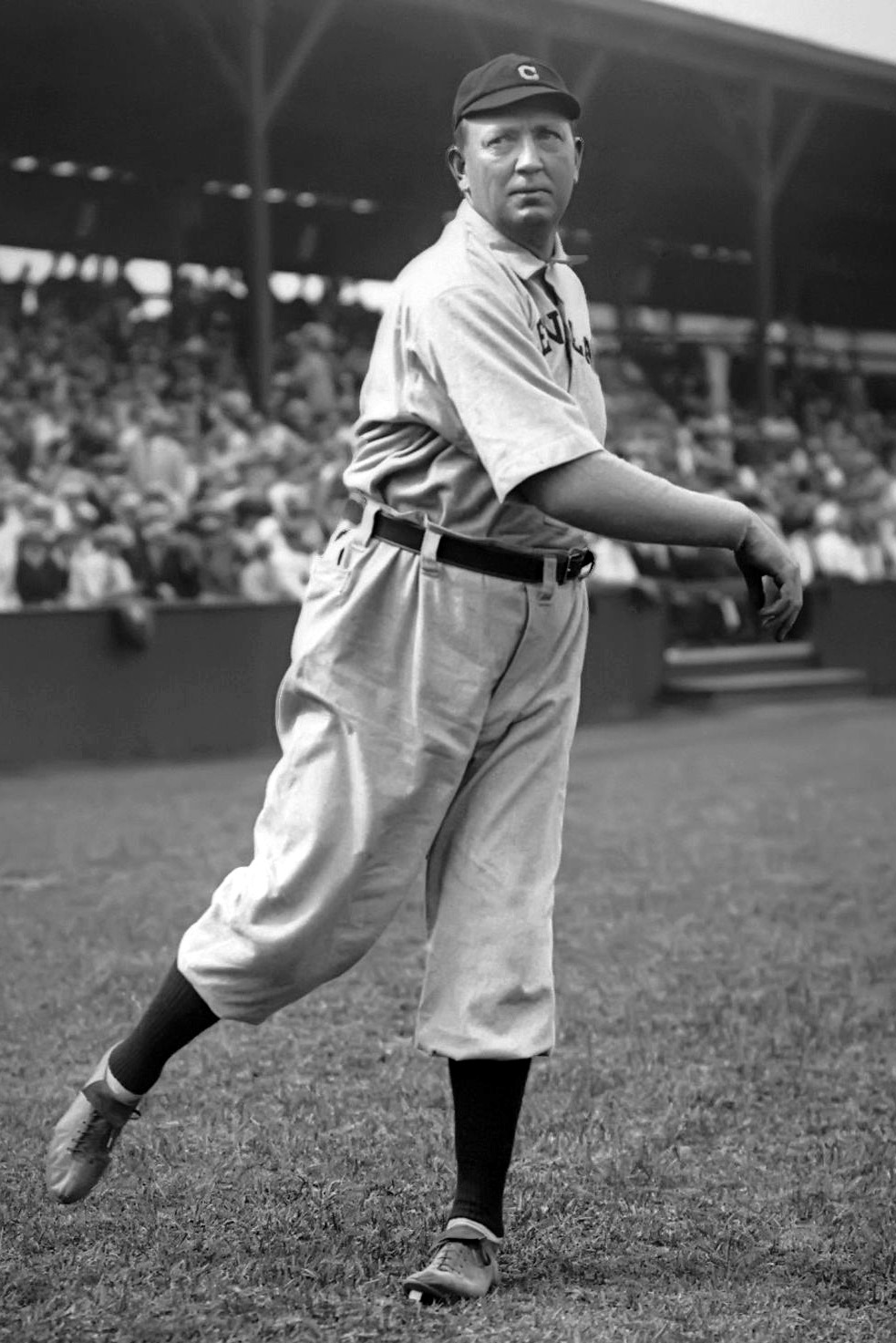
Cy Young held the major league record for 63 years.

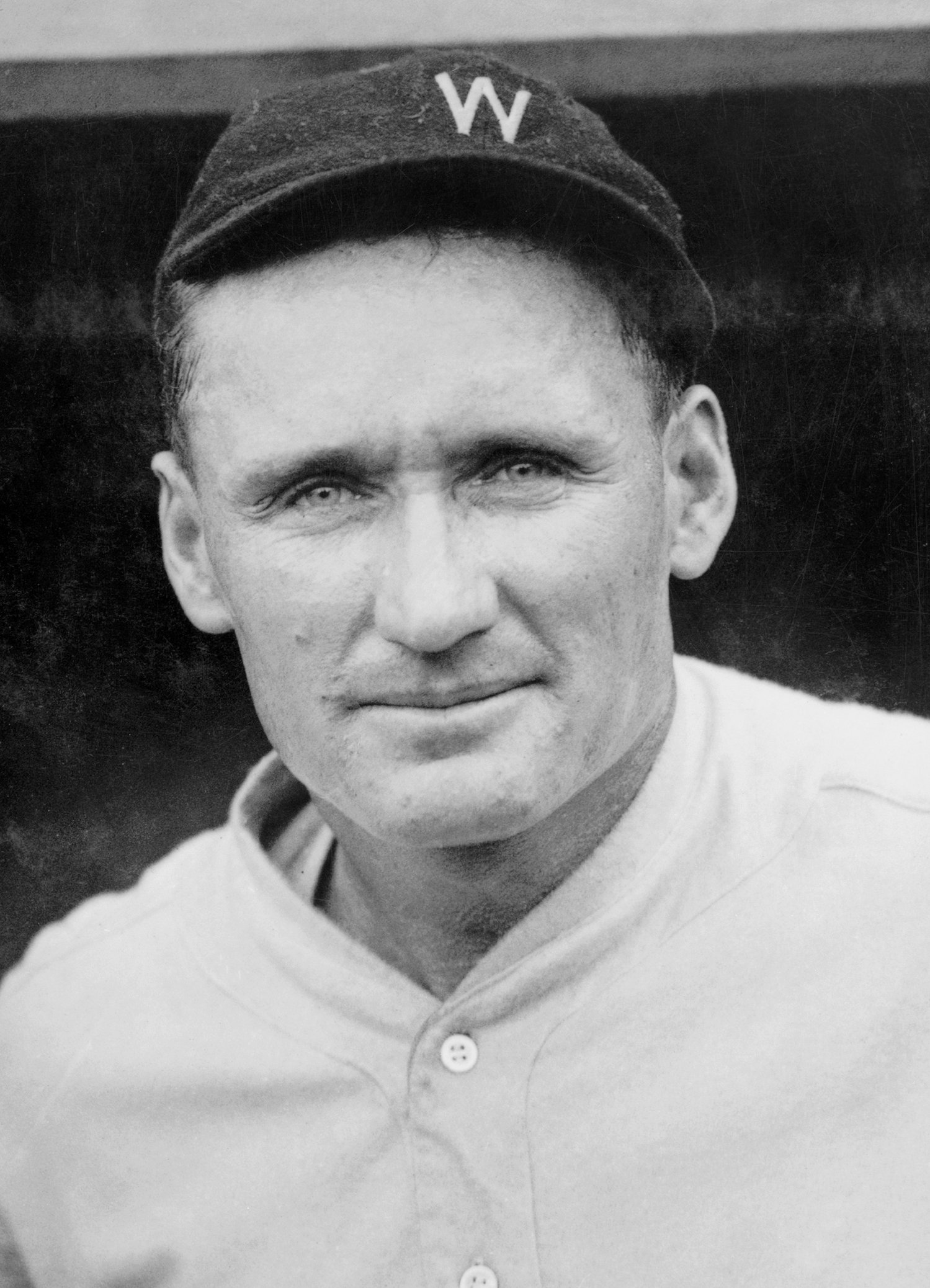
Walter Johnson held the American League record for 61 years.

- Stats updated as of 2026 season.

Rank	Player (2027 Gs)	Throws	Games as pitcher			Other leagues, notes
Rank	Player (2027 Gs)	Throws	MLB	American League	National League	Other leagues, notes
1	Jesse Orosco	L	1,252	686	566	
2	Mike Stanton	L	1,178	560	618	
3	John Franco	L	1,119	0	1,119	
4	Mariano Rivera*	R	1,115	1,115	0	
5	Dennis Eckersley*	R	1,071	869	202	Held major league record, 1998-1999; held American League record, 1995-2008; held record for right-handed pitchers, 1998-2013
6	Hoyt Wilhelm*	R	1,070	622	448	Held major league record, 1968-1998
7	Dan Plesac	L	1,064	627	437	
8	Mike Timlin	R	1,058	894	164	Held American League record, 2008-2009
9	Kent Tekulve	R	1,050	0	1,050	Held National League record, 1986-2004
10	LaTroy Hawkins	R	1,042	525	517	
11	Trevor Hoffman*	R	1,035	0	1,035	
12	José Mesa	R	1,022	540	482	
	Lee Smith*	R	1,022	251	771	
14	Roberto Hernández	R	1,010	696	314	
15	Mike Jackson	R	1,005	650	355	
16	Goose Gossage*	R	1,002	656	346	
17	Lindy McDaniel	R	987	343	644	
18	**Kenley Jansen (0)**	R	983	217	766	
19	Todd Jones	R	982	530	452	
20	David Weathers	R	964	47	917	
21	Fernando Rodney	R	951	771	180	
22	Francisco Rodriguez	R	948	520	428	
23	Rollie Fingers*	R	944	679	265	
24	Gene Garber	R	931	104	827	
25	**Aroldis Chapman (0)**	L	916	496	420	
26	Eddie Guardado	L	908	878	30	
27	Cy Young*	R	906	390	516	Held major league record, 1905-1968; held American League record, 1902-1911
28	Arthur Rhodes	L	900	666	234	
29	Sparky Lyle	L	899	807	92	Held American League record, 1982-1995; held record for left-handed pitchers, 1980-1997; held AL record for left-handed pitchers, 1977-2008
30	Jim Kaat*	L	898	620	278	
31	**Craig Kimbrel (0)**	R	897	313	584	
32	Kyle Farnsworth	R	893	473	420	
33	Tom Gordon	R	890	669	221	
34	Paul Assenmacher	L	884	379	505	
35	Mike Myers	L	883	456	427	Held the single-season record for left-handed pitchers, 1997-2001 (tie)
36	Alan Embree	L	882	463	419	
37	David Robertson	R	881	731	150	
38	Jeff Reardon	R	880	352	528	
39	Don McMahon	R	874	331	543	
40	Joe Smith	R	866	714	152	
41	Phil Niekro*	R	864	124	740	
42	Charlie Hough	R	858	402	456	
43	Billy Wagner*	L	853	15	838	
44	Roy Face	R	848	2	846	Held National League record, 1967-1986; held NL record for right-handed pitchers, 1966-1986
45	Doug Jones	R	846	574	272	
46	Chad Qualls	R	844	153	691	
47	Paul Quantrill	R	841	587	254	
48	Javier López	L	839	172	667	
49	Bob Wickman	R	835	564	271	
50	Steve Reed	R	833	201	632	
51	Julián Tavárez	R	828	218	610	
52	Tug McGraw	L	824	0	824	Held the National League record for left-handed pitchers, 1982-1998
53	Sergio Romo	R	821	238	583	
54	Tyler Clippard	R	807	291	516	
	Nolan Ryan*	R	807	420	387	
56	Walter Johnson*	R	802	802	0	Held American League record, 1921-1982; held AL record for right-handed pitchers, 1917-1995
57	Francisco Cordero	R	800	417	383	
58	Jeff Nelson	R	798	798	0	
59	Rick Honeycutt	L	797	606	191	
60	Steve Kline	L	796	87	709	Held the single-season record for left-handed pitchers, 2001-2010
	**Bryan Shaw (0)**	R	796	567	229	
62	Joe Nathan	R	787	656	131	
63	Buddy Groom	L	786	749	37	
64	Gaylord Perry*	R	777	318	459	
65	Jeremy Affeldt	L	774	184	590	
	Don Sutton*	R	774	174	600	
67	Joakim Soria	R	773	687	86	
68	Bob Howry	R	769	434	335	
69	Darren Oliver	L	766	621	145	
70	Mark Guthrie	L	765	397	368	
	Darold Knowles	L	765	470	295	Held record for left-handed pitchers, 1979-1980
72	Joaquín Benoit	R	764	592	172	
73	Armando Benítez	R	762	239	523	
	Kenny Rogers	L	762	750	12	
75	Tommy John	L	760	578	182	
76	Octavio Dotel	R	758	331	427	
77	Jack Quinn	R	756	563	103	Includes 90 in Federal League
78	Ron Reed	R	751	51	700	
79	Warren Spahn*	L	750	0	750	Held National League record, 1964-1967; held record for left-handed pitchers, 1964-1979; held NL record for left-handed pitchers, 1964-1982
80	Matt Thornton	L	748	652	96	
81	Tom Burgmeier	L	745	745	0	
	Gary Lavelle	L	745	98	647	
83	Willie Hernández	L	744	358	386	
	Greg Maddux*	R	744	0	744	
85	Guillermo Mota	R	743	34	709	
86	Steve Carlton*	L	741	46	695	
87	Ryan Madson	R	740	171	569	
	Russ Springer	R	740	139	601	
89	Brad Ziegler	R	739	256	483	
90	Steve Cishek	R	737	207	530	
	Ron Perranoski	L	737	280	457	Held the single-season record for left-handed pitchers, 1962-1965
92	Ron Kline	R	736	402	334	
93	Rick Aguilera	R	732	520	212	
	Steve Bedrosian	R	732	56	676	
	Mark Melancon	R	732	56	676	
96	Clay Carroll	R	731	37	694	
97	Randy Myers	L	728	164	564	
98	**Adam Ottavino (0)**	R	727	169	558	
99	Jason Isringhausen	R	724	210	514	
	Mike Marshall	R	724	231	493	Holds the single-season record of 106 (set in 1974); holds the American League single-season record of 90 (set in 1979)

== Other Hall of Famers ==
Player	Throws	Games as pitcher			Other leagues, notes
Player	Throws	MLB	American League	National League	Other leagues, notes
John Smoltz*	R	723	8	715	
Pud Galvin*	R	705	0	610	Includes 61 in American Association, 26 in Players' League, 8 in National Association; held major league record, 1888-1905; held the single-season record, 1883-1964
Grover Cleveland Alexander*	R	696	0	696	Held National League record, 1928-1964
Bert Blyleven*	R	692	587	105	
Eppa Rixey*	L	692	0	692	Held the National League record for left-handed pitchers, 1928-1964
Early Wynn*	R	691	691	0	
Tom Glavine*	L	682	0	682	
Robin Roberts*	R	676	113	563	
Waite Hoyt*	R	674	458	216	
Red Faber*	R	669	669	0	
Ferguson Jenkins*	R	664	255	409	
Bruce Sutter*	R	661	0	661	
Tom Seaver*	R	656	97	559	
Christy Mathewson*	R	636	0	636	Held National League record, 1915-1928
Red Ruffing*	R	624	624	0	
Eddie Plank*	L	623	581	0	Includes 42 in Federal League; held American League record, 1911-1921; held AL record for left-handed pitchers, 1902-1906, 1907-1933
Kid Nichols*	R	621	0	621	Held National League record, 1905-1915
Randy Johnson*	L	618	341	277	
Herb Pennock*	L	617	617	0	Held the American League record for left-handed pitchers, 1933-1977
Burleigh Grimes*	R	616	10	606	
Lefty Grove*	L	616	616	0	
Tim Keefe*	R	600	0	444	Includes 126 in American Association, 30 in Players' League
Ted Lyons*	R	594	594	0	
Jim Bunning*	R	591	304	287	
Bob Feller*	R	570	570	0	
Mickey Welch*	R	565	0	565	
CC Sabathia*	L	561	544	17	
Jim Palmer*	R	558	558	0	
Jesse Haines*	R	555	0	555	
Jack Morris*	R	549	549	0	
Mike Mussina*	R	537	537	0	
Rube Marquard*	L	536	0	536	Held the National League record for left-handed pitchers, 1920-1928
Carl Hubbell*	L	535	0	535	
John Clarkson*	R	531	0	531	
Bob Gibson*	R	528	0	528	
Charles Radbourn*	R	527	0	486	Includes 41 in Players' League; held the single-season record, 1883-1964
Don Drysdale*	R	518	0	518	
Vic Willis*	R	513	0	513	
Catfish Hunter*	R	500	500	0	
Whitey Ford*	L	498	498	0	
Hal Newhouser*	L	488	488	0	
Mordecai Brown*	R	481	0	411	Includes 70 in Federal League
Pedro Martínez*	R	476	203	273	
Juan Marichal*	R	471	11	460	
Joe McGinnity*	R	465	73	392	Held American League record, 1901-1902
Amos Rusie*	R	463	0	463	
Bob Lemon*	R	460	460	0	
Chief Bender*	R	459	386	47	Includes 26 in Federal League
Clark Griffith*	R	453	153	266	Includes 34 in American Association
Stan Coveleski*	R	450	450	0	
Dazzy Vance*	R	442	10	432	
Ed Walsh*	R	430	426	4	
Roy Halladay*	R	416	313	103	
Rube Waddell*	L	407	335	72	
Satchel Paige*	R	398	179	0	Includes 91 in Negro National League (first), 85 in Negro American League, 43 in Negro National League (second) (incomplete)
Sandy Koufax*	L	397	0	397	
Jack Chesbro*	R	392	270	122	
Lefty Gomez*	L	368	368	0	
Ichiro Suzuki*	R	1	0	1	
