= Strikeouts per nine innings pitched =

Baseball statistic

In baseball statistics, strikeouts per nine innings pitched (abbreviated K/9, SO/9, or SO/9IP) is the mean of strikeouts (or Ks) by a pitcher per nine innings pitched. It is determined by multiplying the number of strikeouts by nine, and dividing by the number of innings pitched.

== Leaders in Major League Baseball ==
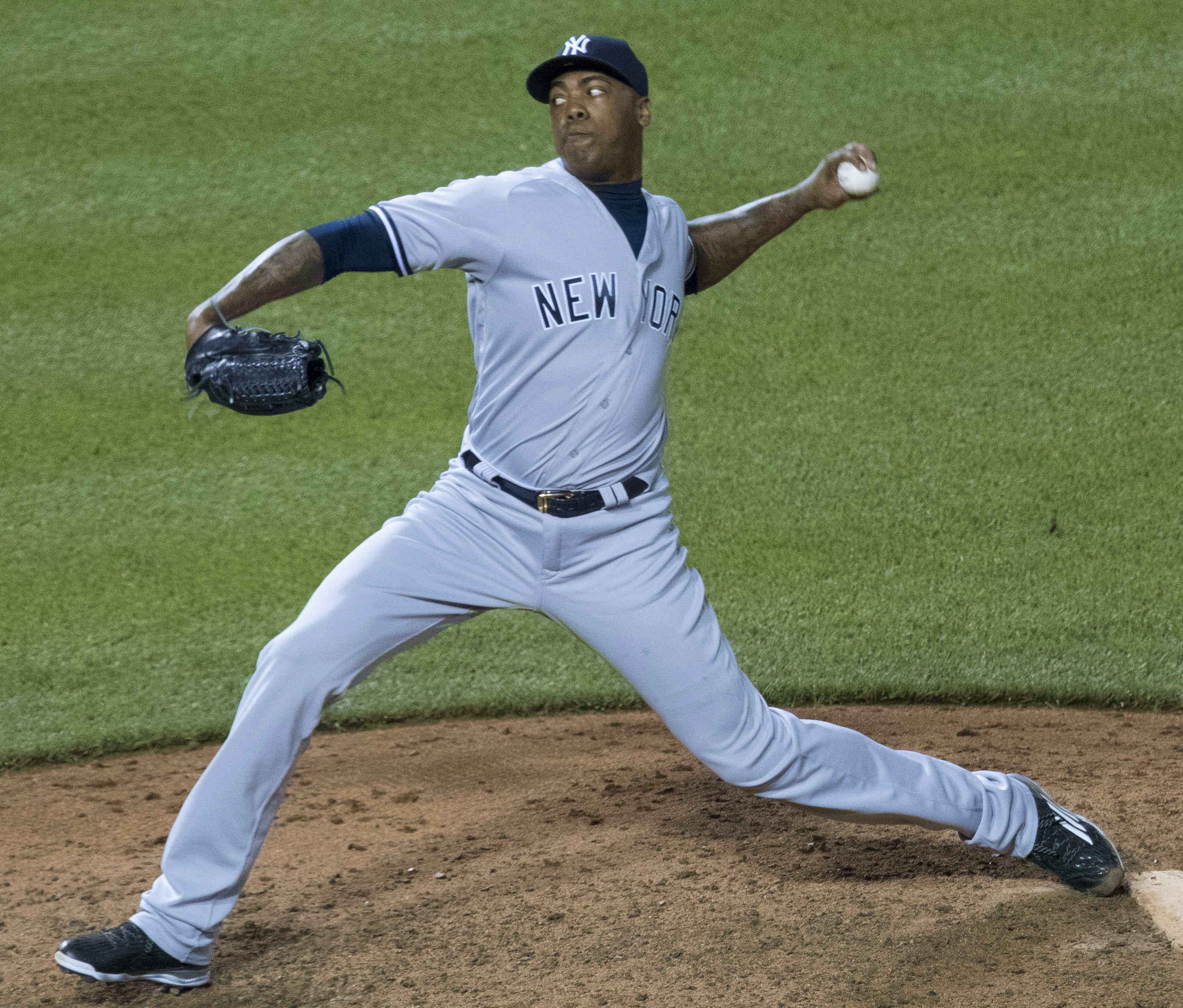
Aroldis Chapman was the leader in this statistic among qualifying relievers, through the 2020 season.

The all-time Major League Baseball (MLB) career leader (minimum of 1,000 innings pitched) in this statistic through 2024 is Blake Snell (11.23). The only other pitchers who had averaged over 10 K/9 are: Chris Sale (11.09), Robbie Ray (11.07), Jacob deGrom (10.97), Max Scherzer (10.65), Randy Johnson (10.61), Yu Darvish (10.59), Stephen Strasburg (10.55), Gerrit Cole (10.37), Kerry Wood (10.32), and Pedro Martinez (10.04).

The top three during the 2024 season were Chris Sale (11.40), Sonny Gray (10.98), and Cole Ragans (10.77).

The career leader in K/9 among MLB relievers (minimum of either 300 innings pitched or 200 appearances) through 2020 was Aroldis Chapman (14.88), followed by Craig Kimbrel (14.66), Kenley Jansen (13.25), Rob Dibble (12.17), David Robertson (11.93), and Billy Wagner (11.92).

In 2022, Kyle Harrison led Minor League Baseball with 14.8 strikeouts per 9 innings, the highest rate for a pitcher in the minor leagues in a season (minimum of 100 innings pitched) dating back to 1960.

== Analysis ==
One effect of K/9 is that it may reward or "inflate" the numbers for pitchers with high batting averages on balls in play (BABIP). Two pitchers may have the same K/9 rates despite striking out a different percentage of batters since one pitcher will pitch to more batters to obtain the same cumulative number of strikeouts. For example, a pitcher who strikes out one batter in an inning, but also gives up a walk or a hit, strikes out a lower percentage of batters than a pitcher who strikes out one batter in an inning without allowing a baserunner, but both have the same K/9.
