= Billy Wagner =

American baseball player (born 1971)

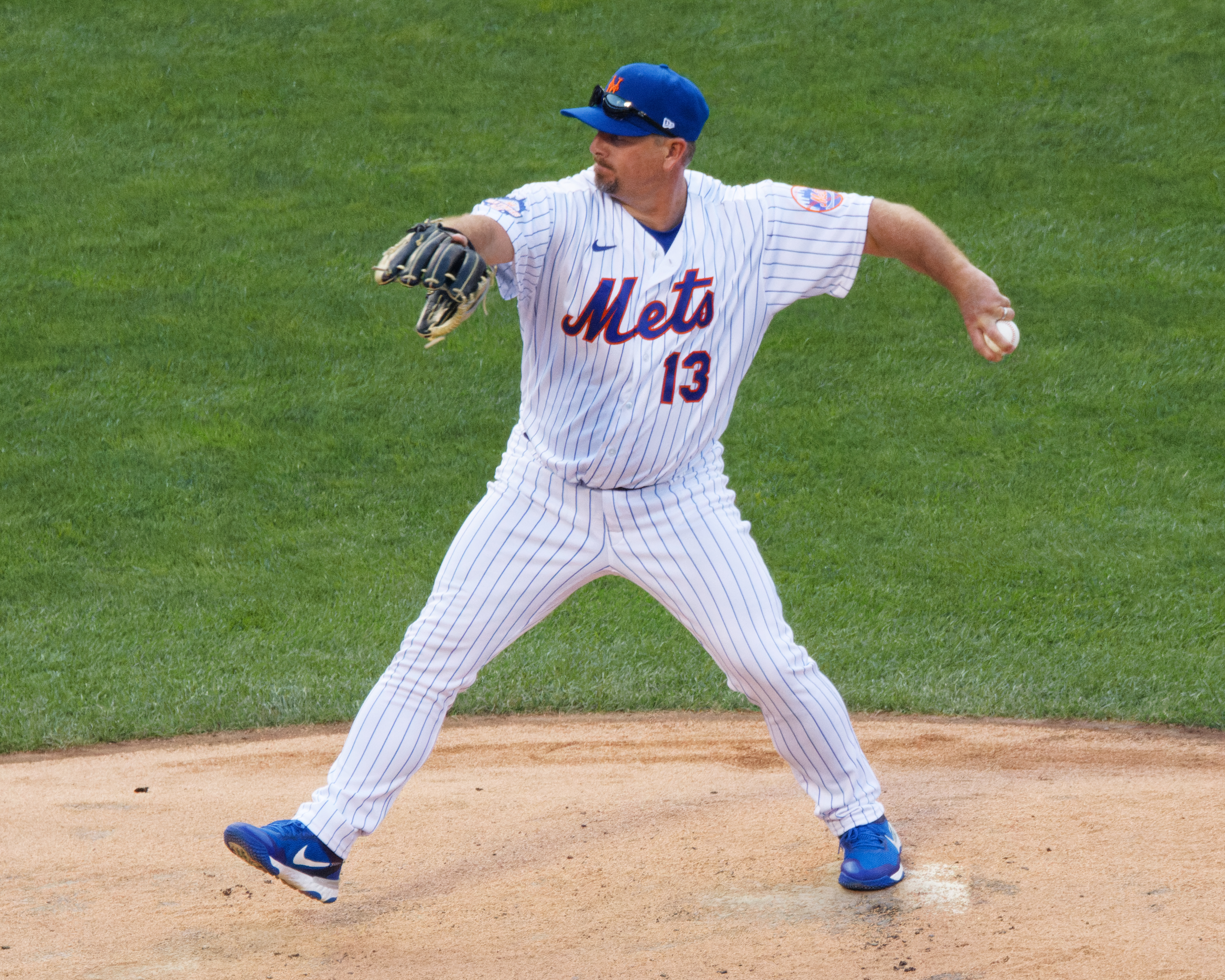
- Wagner in 2022
- Pitcher
- Born: July 25, 1971 (age 55); Marion, Virginia, U.S.
- Batted: Left Threw: Left

MLB debut
- September 13, 1995, for the Houston Astros

Last MLB appearance
- October 3, 2010, for the Atlanta Braves

MLB statistics
- Win–loss record: 47–40
- Earned run average: 2.31
- Strikeouts: 1,196
- Saves: 422
- Stats at Baseball Reference

Teams
- Houston Astros (1995–2003); Philadelphia Phillies (2004–2005); New York Mets (2006–2009); Boston Red Sox (2009); Atlanta Braves (2010)

Career highlights and awards
- 7× All-Star (1999, 2001, 2003, 2005, 2007, 2008, 2010); NL Rolaids Relief Man Award (1999); Pitched a combined no-hitter on June 11, 2003; Houston Astros No. 13 retired; Houston Astros Hall of Fame

Member of the National

Baseball Hall of Fame
- Induction: 2025
- Vote: 82.5% (tenth ballot)

William Edward Wagner (born July 25, 1971), nicknamed "Billy the Kid", is an American former professional baseball pitcher who played 16 seasons in Major League Baseball (MLB) for the Houston Astros, Philadelphia Phillies, New York Mets, Boston Red Sox, and Atlanta Braves from 1995 to 2010. A seven-time All-Star and the 1999 National League (NL) Rolaids Relief Man Award winner, Wagner is one of only eight major league relief pitchers to reach 400 career saves. A left-handed batter and thrower, Wagner stands 5 feet 10 inches (1.78 m) tall and weighs 180 pounds (82 kg).

A natural-born right-hander, Wagner learned to throw left-handed after fracturing his arm twice in his youth. Wagner's career 11.9 strikeouts per nine innings pitched (K/9) is the second highest of any major league pitcher with at least 900 innings pitched (Kenley Jansen). His career 2.31 earned run average, .187 batting average against, and 0.998 WHIP are the lowest of any left-handed pitcher in the live-ball era. He finished in the top ten in saves in the NL ten times, and in the top ten in games finished nine times. In 2025, Wagner was elected to the Baseball Hall of Fame.

== Early life ==
Wagner was born to 16-year-old Yvonne and 18-year-old William “Hotrod” Wagner in Marion, Virginia, on July 25, 1971. Wagner's parents divorced in 1976 when he was five years old. Wagner and his younger sister, Chasity, spent the following 10 years living with various combinations of their parents, their stepparents, and their grandparents in the general Marion area. During this time, Wagner and his family often relied on food stamps. Wagner described a typical breakfast as a "few crackers with peanut butter and a glass of water."

At seven years old, Wagner's right arm was broken when, while playing football with some neighborhood kids, one of them accidentally fell on it. Shortly after having the cast removed, he broke the arm again. To avoid long-term damage to the arm, Wagner, a natural right-hander, began throwing a baseball left-handed.

At 14 years old, Wagner moved in with his aunt, uncle, and cousins, who lived in the Tannersville/Tazewell area about 25 miles (40 km) away from Marion. Despite having fallen behind a year in school due to the instability in his home life, Wagner was socially promoted to Tazewell High School because administrators feared he threw hard enough to injure his middle-school classmates.

== Career ==
=== Amateur career ===
Wagner graduated from Tazewell High School in Tazewell, Virginia, compiling a .451 batting average, 23 stolen bases, 29 runs batted in, 116 strikeouts in 46 innings, a 7–1 pitching record, and a 1.52 ERA in his senior season. As a senior in high school, Wagner was only 5 feet 5 inches (1.65 m) tall and 135 pounds (61 kg) and, as a result, could not get attention from Major League Baseball scouts or Division I schools.

Wagner chose to follow his cousin to Ferrum College, a small liberal arts college in Ferrum, Virginia, where they both played baseball and football. Coaches at Ferrum encouraged Wagner to focus on baseball, and he would eventually take their advice and stop playing football.

Wagner set single-season NCAA records for strikeouts per nine innings, with 19 1/3 in 1992, and the fewest hits allowed per nine innings, with 1.88. He was inducted into the Ferrum College Hall of Fame in 2003.

After the 1992 season, he played collegiate summer baseball with the Brewster Whitecaps of the Cape Cod Baseball League (CCBL), was named the league's outstanding pro prospect, and is a member of the CCBL Hall of Fame class of 2022.

=== Houston Astros ===
==== Minor leagues and early major league career: 1993−97 ====
Wagner was selected in the first round of the Major League Baseball draft in June 1993 by the Houston Astros. He pitched exclusively as a starting pitcher in Minor League Baseball for the Quad Cities River Bandits, until his major league debut. In 1994, Wagner led all North American minor league pitchers in strikeouts, with 204. Wagner made his first Major League appearance with the Astros, as a late-season promotion from AAA baseball, on September 12, 1995, pitching against one batter late in a 10–5 defeat by the New York Mets. This was his only opportunity to pitch for the Astros that season.

Wagner began in 1996, once again in the minor leagues as a starting pitcher, but he finished the season by becoming a relief pitcher for the Astros. He accumulated a 6–2 record with a 3.28 ERA, in twelve starts for the AAA Tucson Toros. His baseball contract was purchased by the Astros on June 2, 1996, and Wagner was then assigned exclusively as a short-relief pitcher by the Astros manager. He finished the Major League season with nine saves in 13 opportunities, allowed 28 hits, and he struck out 67 hitters in 51 2/3 innings – giving him a rate of 11.7 strikeouts per nine innings pitched. His opponents had a batting average of .165 against him.

In 1997, Wagner played his first full season in the major leagues. He accumulated 23 saves in 29 opportunities, and he struck out 106 batters in 66 1/3 innings. This set a major league record of 14.4 strikeouts per nine innings, which broke the old record of 14.1 set by the former Cincinnati Reds reliever Rob Dibble in 1992.

Wagner struck out the side 13 times in his 66 innings pitched, and his season total of 106 strikeouts set a Houston Astros record for relief pitchers.

==== 1998−99 ====
In 1998, Wagner posted a 4–3 record with a 2.70 ERA and 97 strikeouts in 60 innings pitched. He saved 30 games, at the time the second-most in a single season in team history. He converted 19 consecutive save chances between his first blown save against the Los Angeles Dodgers, on April 12, and then his second one facing the St. Louis Cardinals on July 11.

On July 15, 1998, while protecting an 8–7 lead over the Arizona Diamondbacks, Wagner was struck by a batted ball on the left side of his head behind his ear. Wagner was alert and conscious on the ground, and his vital signs remained good. He was carried off the baseball diamond on a stretcher, and it was found that he had suffered a concussion. He spent the night in the hospital. On the next day, he flew home to Houston, and he was also immediately placed on baseball's 15-day disabled list. Wagner worked on his balance and coordination for weeks before he was cleared by the team physicians to embark on a rehabilitation assignment with a minor-league team. After pitching there in three games, Wagner was recalled to the Astros on August 6, and he completed the rest of the baseball season there without incident. The Astros won a franchise-best 102 games while winning the National League Central division title and leading the league in runs scored. Their season ended with a defeat at the hands of the San Diego Padres in the National League Division Series.

Wagner captured the 1999 Relief Man of the Year Award in the National League. He saved 39 games and struck out 124 in 74 innings (15 strikeouts per 9 innings). Wagner posted a 4–1 record with an ERA of 1.57 and had more saves than hits allowed (in 74 2/3 innings, he allowed 35 hits).

==== 2000−03 ====
The 2000 season started off in typical fashion for Wagner, who saved three of the Astros' first four wins while retiring 16 of the first 20 batters he faced. However, after recording a save on May 4 against the Chicago Cubs, he suffered back-to-back blown saves on May 12–13 against the Reds. While he was still occasionally throwing 100 m.p.h. as measured by radar, he was not throwing his slider at 85–90 m.p.h. as often as he had been previously. Wagner continued to struggle before going on the disabled list with a torn flexor tendon in his pitching arm and would miss the final three and a half months of the season. He finished with a 2–4 record, a 6.18 ERA, and six saves in 15 opportunities, striking out 28 and walking 18 in 27 2/3 innings. He would rebound in 2001. Coming off elbow surgery, he posted a record of 2–5 with 39 saves in 41 chances and an ERA of 2.73. In 62 2/3 innings, he struck out 79 hitters.

In 2002, Wagner went 4–2 with a 2.52 ERA, 88 strikeouts, and 35 saves in 75 innings. Then, he enjoyed his best season in 2003, when he reached career-highs in saves (44), innings pitched (86) and games (78), and got 105 strikeouts while leading the league in games finished.

On June 11, 2003, Wagner closed out a no-hitter thrown by a record six pitchers against the New York Yankees. In 2003, he was the majors' hardest-throwing pitcher, throwing 159 pitches at 100 mph or faster. Second on the list was Bartolo Colón with 12. The day the season ended, Wagner criticized the Astros front office for not building a playoff worthy team.

=== Philadelphia Phillies ===
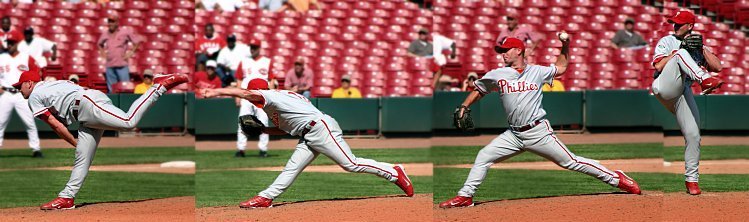
Wagner's pitching motion with the Philadelphia Phillies in 2004.

The Astros traded Wagner to the Philadelphia Phillies for pitchers Brandon Duckworth, Taylor Buchholz, and Ezequiel Astacio on November 3, 2003.

Wagner's 2004 season was shortened by strains to his groin and rotator cuff. He had the best ERA of his career in 2005 and again led the league in games finished. Wagner became a free agent after that season.

In a May 7, 2006 interview, Wagner said that he was confronted by all of his former Phillies teammates in September 2005 after he had criticized their performance in the media by repeatedly saying that the Phillies had "no chance" of making the playoffs. (The Phillies ultimately missed the playoffs by one game.) Phillies left fielder Pat Burrell reportedly called Wagner a "rat." The confrontation and his demand for a no-trade clause were factors that led Wagner to leave Philadelphia.

=== New York Mets ===
Wagner signed a four-year, $43 million contract and a one-year club option with the New York Mets on November 29, 2005. Wagner finished 2006 with 40 saves and a 2.24 ERA and recorded his 300th career save. His performance contributed to the Mets' first division championship in 18 years. However, he did not have a good postseason: he recorded three saves but lost one game and allowed six runs in 5 2/3 innings.

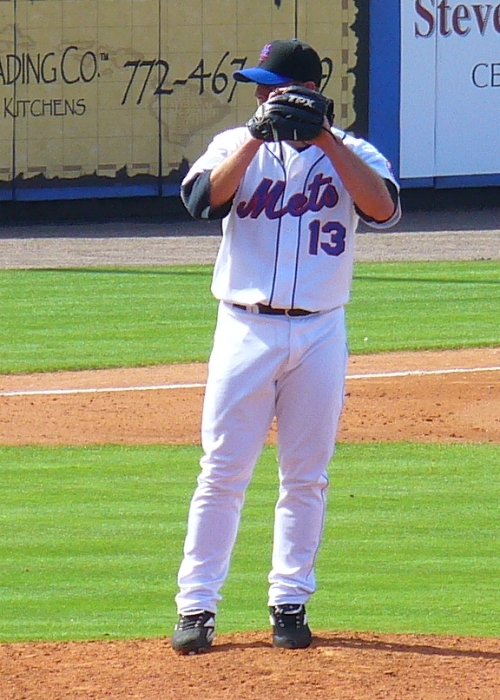
Wagner with the New York Mets in 2007.

Wagner had a good first half of the season in 2007. He was successful in 17 out of 18 save chances, and his ERA was 1.94. July was his best month, when he recorded eight saves in eight chances; did not allow a run scored; and he won the Delivery Man of the Month Award. During that month, Wagner's ERA was 0.00, he gave up two hits, and he pitched enough innings to be equivalent to a complete game pitched. His performance earned him a slot on the National League All-Star Team.

Wagner's second half was not nearly as successful. He converted 13 out of 17 save chances, and his ERA was 3.90. Wagner's pitching performance declined during the final two months of the season. On August 30, Wagner blew a save in the final game of a four-game series between the Phillies and Mets. The final result was a four-game sweep by the Phillies. This sweep turned out to be the difference in the season: the Mets finished one game behind the Phillies at the end of the regular season, completing a seven-game collapse. One more win against the Phillies would have allowed the Mets to win the division that year. Wagner had a 6.23 ERA in August, and he suffered from back spasms during September.

On May 15, 2008, Wagner issued a tirade against his teammates and coaches following the Mets' 1–0 loss in a game against the Washington Nationals, in part directed at teammates including Carlos Beltrán and Carlos Delgado who did not conduct interviews with the press following games. However, Wagner pitched well enough in the beginning of the season to be selected for the All-Star Game. During the game, Wagner, pitching late, surrendered a game-tying double to Evan Longoria, and then the National League lost in 15 innings.

In September 2008, the Mets announced that Wagner had torn the ulnar collateral ligament of his left elbow and also his flexor pronator tendon. These injuries required Tommy John surgery. This surgery, and its recovery, put Wagner out of play for a calendar year. Wagner was paid $10.5 million by the Mets in 2009. For 2010, the Mets had an $8 million option with a $1 million buyout.

In the news conference following the announcement of his major elbow injury, Wagner vowed that he would return to playing in MLB. Although he had previously stated that he would not pitch anymore following 2009, Wagner amended this by saying that he did not wish to end his baseball career in this fashion – ending it on a major injury. He also said that he had dreams of winning a World Series, and also of reaching a total of about 420 saves in his career.

However, Wagner stated furthermore that he had "played his last [baseball] game as a Met". Wagner explained that it would not make good business sense for the Mets to guarantee him $8 million for 2010, pitching or not pitching.

Despite his comments, Wagner remained on the Mets' 40-man roster on the disabled list at the beginning of the season in 2009. He pitched for the first time in 2009 for the Mets on August 20 against the Atlanta Braves. He pitched one inning with two strikeouts and giving up no hits or walks.

=== Boston Red Sox ===
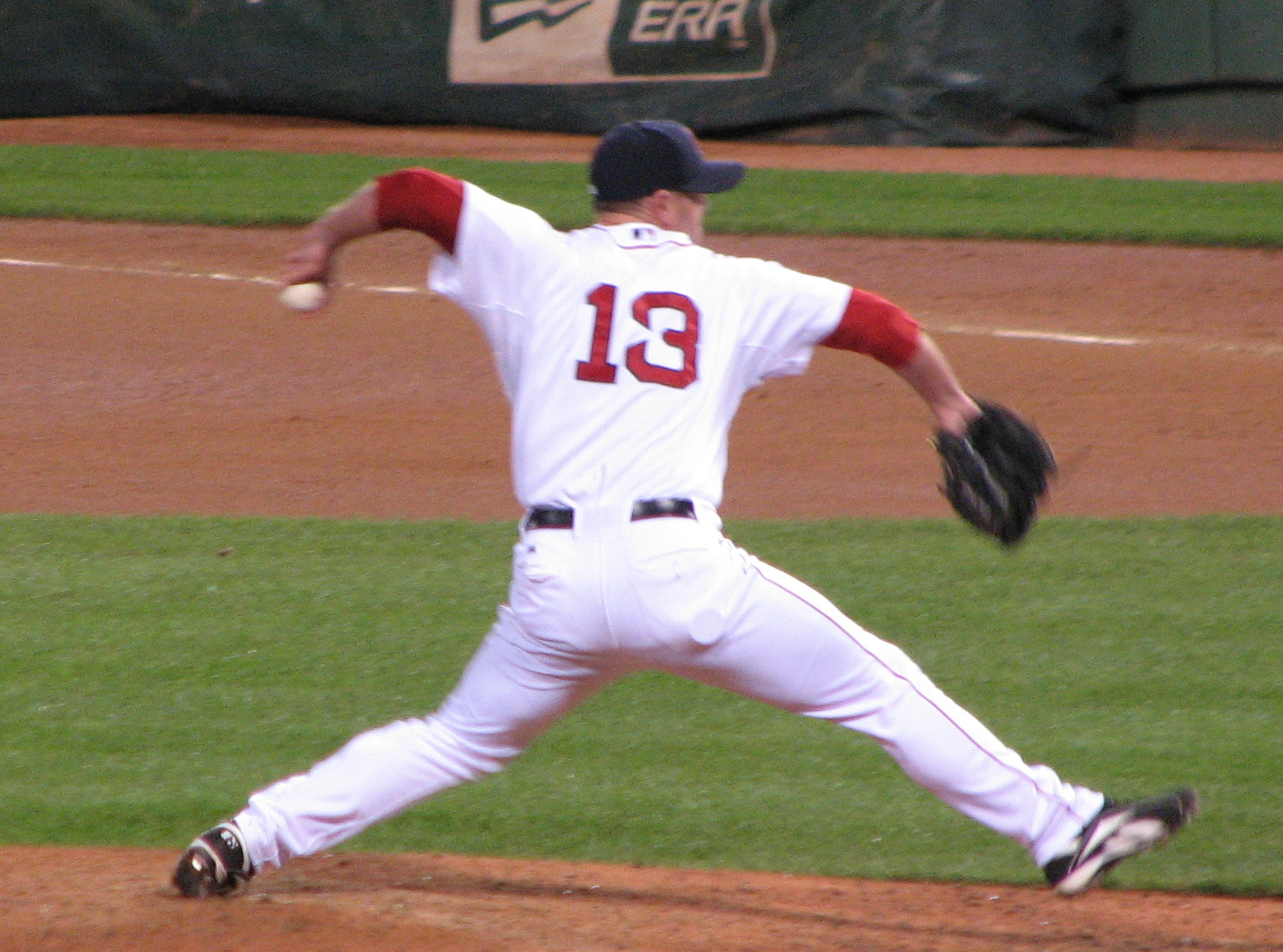
Wagner with the Boston Red Sox in 2009.

On August 21, 2009, the Boston Red Sox reportedly claimed Wagner off waivers from the Mets. After initial reports suggested Wagner would invoke his no-trade clause to veto a trade, he agreed to be traded on August 25 for Chris Carter and Eddie Lora, with the added stipulation that the Red Sox could not exercise his $8 million option for 2010 but could offer him salary arbitration. The Red Sox did offer Wagner arbitration, but he declined so the Red Sox received the first-round draft pick from the team that signed Wagner (Atlanta Braves) and a sandwich pick in the 2010 rookie draft. His only victory in a Red Sox uniform came on September 9, against the Orioles.

=== Atlanta Braves ===
On December 2, 2009, Wagner and the Atlanta Braves agreed on a one-year, $7 million contract that included a $6.5-million vesting option for the 2011 season. On April 30, 2010, Wagner said that he would retire at the end of the 2010 season to spend more time with his family. On June 25, Wagner earned his 400th career save. After the game, he said he still planned to retire after the season. On July 11, Wagner was selected as an injury replacement to the National League All-Star roster, which he declined due to an ankle injury.

Wagner played his final regular season game on October 3 and struck out the final four batters he faced, the last three of whom struck out looking. He concluded his final season with a career-best 1.43 ERA. Wagner made his final major league appearance on October 8 in Game 2 of the National League Division Series against the San Francisco Giants. He injured his left oblique and left the game after facing just two batters. The Braves eventually lost the series before Wagner could recover.

== Post-playing career ==
Wagner retired to Crozet, Virginia, following the 2010 season. On February 12, 2011, Wagner reiterated his intention to retire, stating, "I'm totally content with not playing baseball," Wagner said. "I love watching it, I love talking about it. If I miss anything, it would be some of the guys I played with and actually competing on the field, but other than that, you can keep it." On March 30, 2011, the Braves released Wagner.

Wagner became the baseball coach for The Miller School of Albemarle in Virginia. He coached against his high school alma mater and his high school coach on April 6, 2013. Wagner led his team to four Virginia Independent Schools Athletic Association state championships.

In 2024, Wagner's son, Will Wagner, debuted for the Toronto Blue Jays. He coached Will and his other son Kason at Miller.

On July 2, 2026, Wagner was announced as the pitching coach for the American League at the All-Star Futures Game.

== Accomplishments and honors ==
=== Career perspective ===
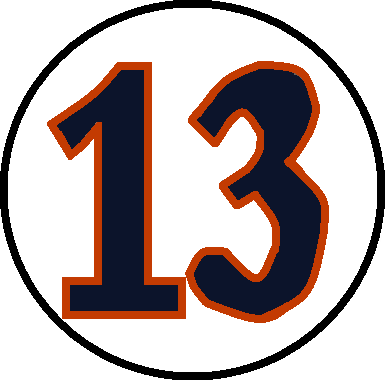
Billy Wagner's number 13 was retired by the Houston Astros in 2025.

Of all pitchers with at least 800 innings pitched, Wagner's 11.9 K/9 and 33.2 percent strikeout rate are both the highest in major league history. Opposing batters hit for only a .187 average against him, lowest in MLB history with at least 800 innings pitched. Wagner's career walks and hits per nine innings ratio of 0.998 is the lowest among pitchers with at least 500 innings.

In 2012, Wagner was inducted into the Virginia Sports Hall of Fame. In 2019, he was inducted into the National College Baseball Hall of Fame. The following year, he was inducted into the Houston Astros Hall of Fame. The Astros announced in February 2025 that they would retire his number 13, which had been worn several times after the team traded him in 2003.

=== National Baseball Hall of Fame consideration ===
Wagner first appeared on balloting for the National Baseball Hall of Fame in 2016 when he received 10.5% of the vote, well short of the 75% required for election but above the 5% minimum required to remain on the ballot. His support continued to increase: 46.4% on the 2021 ballot, 51.0% on the 2022 ballot, 68.1% of the 2023 ballot, and 73.8% on the 2024 ballot. The 2024 ballot put him just five votes shy of the threshold. In 2025, his final year on the ballot, he was elected to the hall after receiving 82.5% of the vote. He became the eighth player in the modern voting era (since 1966) to be elected on his final ballot, after Red Ruffing, Joe Medwick, Ralph Kiner, Jim Rice, Tim Raines, Edgar Martínez, and Larry Walker.

Awards and honors received by Billy Wagner
Award	Result / Section	Year	Ref.
National Baseball Hall of Fame	Inducted	2025	
Relief Man of the Year		1999	
Delivery Man of the Month	July	2007	
Houston Astros Rookie of the Year		1996	
Houston Astros Pitcher of the Year		2003	
Houston Astros Hall of Fame	Inducted	2020	
National College Baseball Hall of Fame	Inducted	2019	
Virginia Sports Hall of Fame and Museum	Inducted	2012	
Ferrum College Hall of Fame	Inducted	2003	

== See also ==
- Houston Astros award winners and league leaders
- List of Houston Astros no-hitters
- List of Houston Astros team records
- List of Major League Baseball career games finished leaders
- List of Major League Baseball career games played as a pitcher leaders
- List of Major League Baseball career saves leaders
- List of Major League Baseball no-hitters

Achievements
Preceded by Kevin Millwood	No-hit game June 11, 2003 (with Oswalt, Munro, Saarloos, Lidge & Dotel)	Succeeded by Randy Johnson
Preceded by Ryan Madson	Steve Carlton Most Valuable Pitcher; 2005	Succeeded by Tom Gordon
